= List of Taito games =

This is a list of games developed or published by Taito, a Japanese video game developer and publisher. It also includes games released exclusively by its international subsidiaries, such as Taito America and Taito of Brazil.

== Electro-mechanical games ==
The following were arcade electro-mechanical games (EM games) manufactured by Taito.

Year	Title	Ref
1967	Basketball	
1967	Periscope	
1967	Crown Soccer Special	
1968	Crown Basketball	
1968	Royal Crown	
1968	Thunder-Bird	
1970	Super Road 7	
1971	Sky Fighter	
1971	Sky Fighter II	
1972	Space Monster	
1976	400 Miles	
1984	Entertainer Robot	
1993	2 Minute Drill	

== Video games ==
Title	Date	Arcade	Other platforms	Alternate title(s)	Comments
Elepong (エレポン, Erepon)	July 1973	Yes	—N/a		
Astro Race (アストロレース, Asutoro Rēsu)	November 1973	Yes	—N/a		
Davis Cup (デビスカップ, Debisu Kappu)	December 1973	Yes	—N/a		
Pro Hockey (プロホッケー, Puro Hokkē)	November 1973	Yes	—N/a		
Soccer (サッカー, Sakkā)	November 1973	Yes	—N/a		
TV Basketball (バスケットボールTV, Basukettobōru TV)	April 1974	Yes	—N/a	Basketball (EU); TV Basketball (NA)	
Attack UFO (アタック UFO)	August 1974	Yes	—N/a		
Speed Race (スピードレース, Supīdo Rēsu)	November 1974	Yes	—N/a	Racer (NA); Wheels (NA)	
Tahitian (タヒチアン, Tahichian)	May 1975	Yes	—N/a		
Speed Race DX (スピードレースDX, Supīdo Rēsu DX)	August 1975	Yes	—N/a	Wheels DX (NA)	
Western Gun (ウエスタンガン, Uesutan Gan)	September 1975	Yes	Atari 8-bit, Bally Astrocade, Commodore 64, Commodore 128	Gun Fight (NA)	
Attack (アタック, Attakku)	September 1976	Yes	—N/a		
Avenger (アベンジャー, Abenjā)	January 1976	Yes	—N/a		
Interceptor (インターセプター, Intāseputā)	March 1976	Yes	—N/a		
Speed Race Twin (ツインスピードレース, Tsuin Supīdo Rēsu)	April 1976	Yes	—N/a	Wheels Twin (NA)	
Crashing Race (クラッシングレース, Kurasshingu Rēsu)	July 1976	Yes	—N/a		
Tennis (テニス, Tenisu)	January 1977	Yes	—N/a		
Wall Break (ウォールブレイク, Uōru Bureiku)	January 1977	Yes	—N/a		
Flying Fortress (フライングフォートレス, Furaingu Fōtoresu)	March 1977	Yes	—N/a		
Missile-X (ミサイル-X, Misairu-X)	March 1977	Yes	—N/a		Licensed to Midway for US release as Guided Missile.
Fisco 400 (フィスコ400, Fisuko 400)	April 1977	Yes	—N/a	Cisco 400 (シスコ400, Shisuko 400)	
Road Champion (ロードチャンピオン, Rōdo Chanpion)	April 1977	Yes	—N/a		
Flying Fortress II (フライングフォートレスII, Furaingu Fōtoresu II)	June 1977	Yes	—N/a		
T.T Barrier (T.Tバリア, T.T Baria)	June 1977	Yes	—N/a		
Cross Fire (クロスファイア, Kurosu Faia)	August 1977	Yes	—N/a		
T.T Block (T.Tブロック, T.T Burokku)	August 1977	Yes	—N/a		
Gunman (ガンマン, Ganman)	October 1977	Yes	—N/a		
Super High-Way (スーパーハイウェイ, Sūpā Hai-Uei)	October 1977	Yes	—N/a		
Super Speed Race (スーパースピードレース, Sūpā Supīdo Rēsu)	December 1977	Yes	—N/a		
Super Block (スーパーブロック, Sūpā Burokku)	February 1978	Yes	—N/a		
Space Invaders (スペースインベーダー, Supēsu Inbēdā)	April 19, 1978	Yes	Apple II, Atari 2600, Atari 5200, Atari 8-bit, Color FX, Commodore 64, Game Boy, Game Boy Color, Game Boy Advance, iOS, Java ME, Mobile Phone, MSX, NES, Nintendo 64, PC, PlayStation, PlayStation 2, PSP (Taito Legends Power-Up), SG-1000, ZX Spectrum, Sky Active, SNES, VG Pocket Caplet, Virtual Console, WonderSwan, Xbox		
Top Bowler (トップボウラー, Toppu Bourā)	June 1978	Yes	—N/a		
Blue Shark (ブルーシャーク, Burū Shāku)	July 1978	Yes	—N/a		Released in the US by Midway in September 1978.
Super Speed Race V (スーパースピードレースV, Sūpā Supīdo Rēsu V)	July 1978	Yes	—N/a		
Speed Race CL5 (スピードレースCL5, Supīdo Rēsu CL5)	September 1978	Yes	—N/a		
Space Invaders Color (スペースインベーダーのカラー, Supēsu Inbēdā no Karā)	October 1978	Yes	PlayStation 2 (Taito Memories Volume 1)		
ZunZun Block (ズンズンブロック, ZunZun Burokku)	April 1979	Yes	—N/a		
Field Goal (フィールドゴール, Fīrudo Gōru)	July 1979	Yes	PlayStation 2 (Taito Memories II Volume 2)		
Space Invaders Part II (スペースインベーダーパートII, Supēsu Inbēdā Pāto II)	July 1979	Yes	Game Boy, PC, PlayStation 2, PSP (Taito Legends Power-Up), Xbox	Deluxe Space Invaders (NA)	
Space Chaser (スペースチェイサー, Supēsu Cheisā)	September 1979	Yes	PlayStation 2 (Taito Memories II Volume 1), PSP (Taito Legends Power-Up)		
Straight Flush (ストレートフラッシュ, Sutorēto Furasshu)	October 1979	Yes	—N/a		
Lunar Rescue (ルナレスキュー, Runa Resukyū)	November 1979	Yes	Acorn Electron, BBC Micro, Commodore 64, PC, PlayStation 2, PSP (Taito Legends Power-Up), ZX Spectrum, Xbox	Galaxy Rescue (ギャラクシーレスキュー, Gyarakushī Resukyū)	
Speed Race GP V (スピードレースGPV, Supīdo Rēsu GPV)	December 1979	Yes	—N/a		
Super Speed Race GP V (スーパースピードレースGP V, Sūpā Supīdo Rēsu GP V)	December 1979	Yes	—N/a		
Balloon Bomber (バルーンボンバー, Barūn Bonbā)	March 1980	Yes	PlayStation 2, PSP		
Crazy Balloon (クレイジーバルーン, Kureijī Barūn)	March 1980	Yes	Atari 2600, PlayStation 2, PSP, Xbox		
Steel Worker (スチールワーカー, Suchīru Wākā)	March 1980	Yes	—N/a		
Lupin the 3rd (ルパン三世, Rupan Sansei)	April 1980	Yes	—N/a		
Astro Zone (アストロゾーン, Asutoro Zōn)	May 1980	Yes	—N/a		
Polaris (ポラリス, Porarisu)	July 1980	Yes	Atari 2600, PlayStation 2 (Taito Memories II Volume 2)		
Indian Battle (インドのバトル, Indo no Batoru)	October 1980	Yes	—N/a		
Space Cyclone (スペースサイクロン, Supēsu Saikuron)	October 1980	Yes	—N/a		
Phoenix (フェニックス, Fenikkusu)	December 1980	Yes	Atari 2600, PC, PlayStation 2, PSP (Taito Legends Power-Up), Xbox		
Tri-Attacker (トライアタッカー, Torai-Atakkā)	1980	Yes	—N/a		
Grand Champion (グランドチャンピオ, Gurando Champion)	June 1981	Yes	PlayStation 2 (Taito Memories II Volume 1)		
Marine Date (マリンデート, Marin Dēto)	June 1981	Yes	—N/a		
Rock Climber (ロッククライマー, Rokku Kuraimā)	August 1981	Yes	—N/a		
Space Cruiser (スペースクルーザー, Supēsu Kurūzā)	September 1981	Yes	—N/a		
Space Seeker (スペースシーカー, Supēsu Shīkā)	September 1981	Yes	—N/a		
Frog & Spiders (カエル＆スパイダー, Kaeru & Supaidā)	October 1981	Yes	—N/a		
Qix (クイックス, Kuikkusu)	October 1981	Yes	Amiga, Apple II, Atari 8-bit, Atari 5200, Commodore 64, MS-DOS, Java ME, NES, IBM PC, PlayStation 2, PSP, Xbox		Developed by Taito America
Fitter (フィッター, Fitter)	October 1981	Yes	—N/a	Round-Up (NA) Catch Match (BR)	
Colony 7 (コロニー7, Koronī 7)	1981	Yes	Atari 2600. PC, PlayStation 2 and Xbox (Taito Legends)		Developed and published by Taito America
Space Dungeon (スペースダンジョン, Supēsu Danjon)	1981	Yes	PSP (Taito Legends Power-Up)		
Alpine Ski (アルペンスキー, Arupen Sukī)	January 1982	Yes	PC, PlayStation 2, PSP, Xbox		
Port Man (ポートマン, Pōto Man)	March 1982	Yes	—N/a	Dock Man	
Strike Bowling (ストライクボーリング, Sutoraiku Bōringu)	April 1982	Yes	—N/a		
Wild Western (ワイルドウエスタン, Wairudo Uesutan)	April 1982	Yes	PC, PlayStation 2, Xbox		
Birdie King (バーディーキング, Bādī Kingu)	May 1982	Yes	—N/a		
Jungle Hunt (ジャングルハント, Janguru Hanto)	June 1982	Yes	Apple II, Atari 2600, Atari 5200, Atari 8-bit, ColecoVision, Commodore 64, VIC-20, IBM PC, MSX, IBM PC, TI-99/4A. PC, PlayStation 2, and Xbox (Taito Legends)	Jungle King (ジャングルキング, Janguru Kingu), Pirate Pete (パイレーツピート, Pairētsu Pīto)	
Jolly Jogger (ジョリージョガー, Jorī Jogā)	September 1982	Yes	—N/a		
Time Tunnel (タイムトンネル, Taimu Tonneru)	September 1982	Yes	PlayStation 2 (Taito Memories II Volume 1)		
Front Line (フロントライン, Furonto Rain)	November 1982	Yes	Atari 2600, ColecoVision, MSX, NES, PC, PlayStation 2, Virtual Console, Xbox	Big Combat (prototype)	
The Electric Yo-Yo	1982	Yes	PC, PlayStation 2 and Xbox (Taito Legends)		Developed and published by Taito America
Adventure Canoe	1982	Yes	—N/a		
Kram	1982	Yes	—N/a		Developed and published by Taito America
Qix II: Tournament	1982	Yes	—N/a		Developed and published by Taito America
Sunshine Egg (サンシャインエッグ, Sanshain Eggu)	1982	Yes	—N/a		
Super Mouse (スーパーマウス, Sūpā Mausu)	1982	Yes	—N/a		
Super Rider (スーパーライダー, Sūpā Raidā)	March 1983	Yes	—N/a		
Bio-Attack (バイオアタック, Baio Attakku)	April 1983	Yes	—N/a		
Birdie King 2 (バーディーキング 2, Bādī Kingu 2)	April 1983	Yes	—N/a		
Highway Race (ハイウェイレース, Haiwei Rēsu)	April 1983	Yes	—N/a		
Zoo Keeper (ズーキーパー, Zū Kīpā)	May 1983	Yes	PC, PlayStation 2, Xbox (Taito Legends)		Developed by Taito America
Elevator Action (エレベーターアクション, Erebētā Akushon)	June 1983	Yes	Amstrad CPC, Atari 2600, Commodore 64, Game Boy, MSX, NES, PC, PlayStation 2, PSP, ZX Spectrum, Virtual Console, Xbox	Spy Agent	
Laser Grand Prix (レーザーグランプリ, Rēzā Guran Puri)	September 1983	Yes	—N/a		
Water Ski (ウォータースキー, Uōtā Sukī)	September 1983	Yes	—N/a		
Fighting Roller (ファイティングローラー, Faitingu Rōrā)	October 1983	Yes	—N/a	Roller Aces (NA)	Developed by Kaneko
Joshi Volleyball (女子バレーボール, Joshi Barēbōru; "Women's Volleyball")	October 1983	Yes	—N/a	Big Spikers	
Ultra Quiz (ウルトラクイズ, Urutora Kuizu)	October 1983	Yes	—N/a		
Change Lanes	1983	Yes	—N/a		Developed by Taito America
The Tin Star (ティンスター, Tin Sutā)	January 1984	Yes	—N/a		
Sea Fighter Poseidon (シーファイター・ポセイドン, Shī Faitā Poseidon)	March 1984	Yes	PlayStation 2 (Taito Memories II Volume 2)		
Chack'n Pop (ちゃっくんぽっぷ, Chikku n Poppu)	April 1984	Yes	FM-7, MSX, NES, SG-1000, PC, PC-6001, PC-8801, PlayStation 2, PSP, Sharp X1, Virtual Console, Xbox		
Field Day	May 1984	Yes	PlayStation 2 (Taito Memories II Volume 1)	The Athletic (ザ・運動会, The Undokai)	
Victorious Nine (ビクトリアスナイン, Bikutoriasu Nain)	May 1984	Yes	—N/a		
Gyrodine (ジャイロダイン, Jairodain)	July 1984	Yes	MSX, NES, PlayStation 2 (Taito Memories II Volume 2)		Developed by Crux
Buggy Challenge (バギーチャレンジ, Bagī Charenji)	August 1984	Yes	PlayStation 2 (Taito Memories II Volume 2)		
Great Swordsman (グレートソードマン, Gurēto Sōdoman)	September 1984	Yes	PC, PlayStation 2, Xbox		
Ninja-kun: Adventure of Devil Castle (忍者くん魔城の冒険, Ninja-kun Majō no Bōken)	October 1984	Yes	MSX, NES	Ninja-Kid	Developed by UPL
Ben Bero Beh (べんべろべえ, Ben Bero Bee)	November 1984	Yes	PlayStation 2 (Taito Memories II Volume 1)	I Study Kabei Belo	
Cosmos Circuit (コスモスサーキット, Kosumo Susākitto)	November 1984	Yes	—N/a		
Cycle Mahbou (サイクル・マー坊, Saikuru Mābō)	December 1984	Yes	—N/a		
Ninja Hayate (忍者ハヤテ)	December 1984	Yes	PlayStation, Mega-CD, Sega Saturn	Revenge of the Ninja (EU, US)	
Birdie King 3 (バーディーキングIII, Bādī Kingu III)	1984	Yes	—N/a		
Change Color (チェンジのカラー, Chenji no Karā)	1984	Yes	—N/a		
Choro-Q	1984	No	MSX		
Complex X (コンプレックスX, Konpurekkusu X)	1984	Yes	—N/a		Developed by Taito America
Fire Battle (ファイアーバトル, Faiā Batoru)	1984	Yes	—N/a		Developed by Woodplace
Forty Love (フォーティラヴ, Fōti Ravu)	1984	Yes	—N/a	40-0	
Jan Friend	1984	No	MSX		
Kick Start Wheelie King (キックサルトウイリーキング, Kikku Sutāto Uirī Kingu)	1984	Yes	—N/a		
Pit & Run - F-1 Race (ピット＆ラン-F-1レース, Pitto & Ran - F-1 Rēsu)	1984	Yes	—N/a		
Sweet Acorn	1984	No	MSX		
Xyzolog	1984	No	MSX, Master System		
Outer Zone (アウターゾーン, Autā Zōn)	January 1985	Yes	—N/a		
Metal Soldier Isaac II (メタルソルジャー・アイザック II, Metaru Sorujā Aizakku II)	February 1985	Yes	PlayStation 2 (Taito Memories II Volume 2)		
Samurai Nihon-ichi (侍・日本一)	February 1985	Yes	—N/a		Developed by Kaneko
Go! Go! Mr. Yamaguchi (ゆけゆけ山口君, Yuke Yuke! Yamaguchi-kun)	March 1985	Yes	—N/a		Developed by Kaneko
Return of the Invaders (リターン・オブ・ザ・インべーダー, Ritān obu za Inbēdā)	March 1985	Yes	PC, PlayStation 2, PSP (Taito Legends Power-Up), Xbox		Developed by UPL
Raiders5 (レイダース5, Reidāsu5)	April 1985	Yes	—N/a		Developed by UPL
Ping-Pong King (ピンポンキング, Pin Pon Kingu)	June 1985	Yes	—N/a		Developed by Taito America
Seafly (セアフリー, Seafurī)	June 1985	Yes	—N/a		
Super Speed Race Jr. (スーパースピードレース・ジュニア, Sūpā Supīdo Rēsu Jr.)	June 1985	Yes	—N/a		
Wyvern F-0 (ワイバーンF-0, Waibān F-0)	June 1985	Yes	—N/a		
The Fairyland Story (フェアリーランドストーリー, Fearīrando Sutōrī)	July 1985	Yes	MSX, PC, PlayStation 2, Xbox		
Space Battleship Yamato (宇宙戦艦ヤマト, Uchū Senkan Yamato)	July 1985	Yes	—N/a		
Mat Mania	September 1985	Yes	—N/a	Exciting Hour (エキサイティングアワー, Ekisaitingu Awā)	Developed by Technōs Japan
Rumba Lumber (ルンバランバ, Runba Ranba)	September 1985	Yes	—N/a		
The Legend of Kage (影の伝説, Kage no Densetsu)	October 1985	Yes	Amstrad CPC, Commodore 64, MSX, NES, PC, PlayStation 2, PSP, Sharp X1, ZX Spectrum, Xbox		
NY Captor (NYキャプター, NY Kyaputā)	October 1985	Yes	—N/a		
Kusa Yakyū (草野球; "Sandlot Baseball")	October 1985	Yes	—N/a		
Super Dead Heat (スーパーデッドヒート, Sūpā Deddo Hīto)	October 1985	Yes	—N/a		
Tiger-Heli (タイガーヘリ, Taigā Heri)	October 1985	Yes	NES, PlayStation		Developed by Toaplan
Typhoon Gal	October 1985	Yes	PlayStation 2 (Taito Memories II Volume 2)	Onna Sanshirō (女三四郎)	
Knuckle Joe (ナックルジョー, Nakkuru Jō)	1985	Yes	—N/a		Developed by Seibu Kaihatsu
Lady Master (レディーマスター, Redī Masutā)	1985	Yes	—N/a	Nun Chackun (NA)	Developed by Kaneko
Sky Destroyer (スカイデストロイヤー, Sukai Desutoroiyā)	1985	Yes	NES		
Time Gal (タイムギャル, Taimu Gyaru)	1985	Yes	LaserActive, MSX, PlayStation, Mega-CD, Sega Saturn		
Battle Lane Vol. 5 (バトルレーン5, Batoru Rēn 5)	January 1986	Yes	—N/a		Developed by Technōs Japan
Halley's Comet (ハレーズコメット, Harēzu Kometto)	January 1986	Yes	PlayStation 2 (Taito Memories II Volume 2)		
Big Event Golf (ビッグイベントゴルフ, Biggu Ibento Gorufu)	March 1986	Yes	—N/a		
Gladiator	March 1986	Yes	Amstrad CPC, Commodore 64, PC, PlayStation 2, ZX Spectrum, Xbox	Ougon no Shiro (黄金の城; "Golden Castle")	
Guardian	March 1986	Yes	—N/a	Get Star (ゲットスター, Getto Sutā)	Developed by Toaplan
Scramble Formation (スクランブル・フォーメーション, Sukuranburu Fōmēshon)	April 1986	Yes	MSX, PC, PlayStation 2, Xbox	Tokio (NA)	
Renegade	May 1986	Yes	Amiga, Amstrad CPC, Apple II, Atari ST, Commodore 64, NES, Master System, ZX Spectrum, Virtual Console	Nekketsu Kōha Kunio-kun (熱血硬派くにおくん)	Developed by Technōs Japan
Daikaijū no Gyakushū (大怪獣の逆襲)	June 1986	Yes	—N/a	Giant Monster Counter Attack	Developed by Technōs Japan
Empire City: 1931 (エンパイア シティ1931, Enpaia Shiti 1931)	June 1986	Yes	—N/a		Developed by Seibu Kaihatsu
Arkanoid (アルカノイド, Arukanoido)	July 1986	Yes	Amiga, Amstrad CPC, Apple II, Apple IIGS, Atari 8-bit, Atari ST, BBC Micro, Commodore 64, iOS, MS-DOS, MSX, Mac, NES, SNES, TRS-80 CoCo, ZX Spectrum		
Slap Fight (スラップファイト, Surappu Faito)	July 1986	Yes	Amstrad CPC, Atari ST, Commodore 64. Sega Mega Drive, ZX Spectrum	Alcon (NA)	Developed by Toaplan
Musashi no Ken – Tadaima Shugyō Chu	August 18, 1986	No	NES		
Bubble Bobble (バブルボブル, Baburu Boburu)	September 1986	Yes	Amiga, Amstrad CPC, Apple II, Atari ST, Commodore 64, FM Towns Marty, MS-DOS, Game Boy, MSX, NES, PC, PlayStation, PlayStation 2, Game Gear, Master System, X68000, ZX Spectrum, UltraCade, TI-83, Virtual Console, Xbox		
KiKi KaiKai (奇々怪界)	October 1986	Yes	Mobile Phone, MSX, NES, PC, PC Engine, PlayStation 2, PSP, Virtual Console, Xbox	Knight Boy (NA, EU)	
Mission 660 (ミッション660)	October 1986	Yes	—N/a	The Alphax Z	Developed by Woodplace
Takeshi no Chōsenjō (たけしの挑戦状)	December 10, 1986	No	NES, Virtual Console	Takeshi's Challenge	
Prebillian (プレビリアン, Purebirian)	December 1986	Yes	—N/a		Developed by Kaneko
Violent Shooting (バイオレントシューティング, Baiorento Shūtingu)	1986	Yes	—N/a	Cycle Shooting	
Land Sea Air Squad	1986	Yes	PlayStation 2 (Taito Memories II Volume 2)	Riku Kai Kū Saizensen (陸海空最前線); Storming Party	
Panic Road (パニックどうろ, Panikku Dōro)	1986	Yes	—N/a		Developed by Seibu Kaihatsu
SRD Mission (SRDミッション)	1986	Yes	—N/a		
The Lost Castle in Darkmist (ダークミスト, Dāku Misuto)	January 1987	Yes	—N/a		Developed by Seibu Kaihatsu
Darius (ダライアス, Daraius)	February 1987	Yes	Amiga, Atari ST, Game Boy Advance, PC Engine, PC Engine CD-ROM, ZX Spectrum, Virtual Console	Darius+	
Rastan Saga	March 1987	Yes	Amstrad CPC, Apple IIGS, Commodore 64, MS-DOS, Game Gear, MSX, IBM PC, PlayStation 2, PSP, Master System, ZX Spectrum, Xbox	Rastan Saga (ラスタンサーガ, Rasutan Sāga)	
Sky Shark (飛翔鮫, Hishou Zame)	March 1987	Yes	Amiga, Amstrad CPC, Atari ST, Commodore 64, FM Towns, MS-DOS, NES, X68000, ZX Spectrum	Flying Shark (EU)	Developed by Toaplan
Extermination (エクスターミネーション, Ekusutāminēshon)	April 1987	Yes	—N/a		
Arkanoid: Revenge of Doh (アルカノイド・リベンジ・オブ・ドゥ, Arukanoido Ribenji Obu Dou)	June 1987	Yes	Amiga, Amstrad CPC, Apple II, Apple IIGS, Atari ST, Commodore 64, MS-DOS, MSX, NES, X68000, ZX Spectrum	Arkanoid 2	
Exzisus (イグジーザス, Igujīzasu)	August 1987	Yes	PC, PlayStation 2, Xbox		
Kick and Run (キック&ラン, Kikku ando Ran)	August 1987	Yes	PlayStation 2 (Taito Memories II Volume 1), Famicom Disk System		
Vs. Hot Smash (VSホットスマッシュ, VS Hotto Sumasshu)	August 1987	Yes	—N/a		
Wardner (ワードナの森, Wādona no Mori)	September 1987	Yes	NES, Sega Mega Drive	Pyros (NA)	Developed by Toaplan
Minelvaton Saga: Ragon no Fukkatsu (ミネルバトンサーガ ラゴンの復活, Minerubatonsāga Ragon no Fukkatsu)	October 23, 1987	No	NES		
Thundercade	October 1987	Yes	—N/a	Tokushu Butai UAG (特殊舞台UAG; "Special Forces U.A.G. (Un-Attached Grenadier)"); Twin Formation	Developed by SETA Corporation
Twin Cobra	November 1987	Yes	Mobile Phone, NES, PC Engine, Sega Mega Drive, X68000	Ultimate Tiger (究極タイガー, Kyūkyoku Tiger)	Developed by Toaplan
Darius Extra Version (ダライアスエキストラバージョン, Daraiasu Ekisutora Bājon)	1987	Yes	—N/a		
Full Throttle (フルスロットル, Furu Surottoru)	1987	Yes	PlayStation 2 (Taito Memories II Volume 2)	Top Speed	
Midnight Landing (ミッドナイトランディング, Middonaito Randingu)	1987	Yes	—N/a		
Plump Pop (プランプポップ, Puranpu Poppu)	1987	Yes	PC, PlayStation 2, Xbox		
Super Qix (スーパークイックス, Sūpā Kuikkusu)	1987	Yes	IBM PC, PlayStation 2, Xbox		
Tournament Arkanoid	1987	Yes	—N/a		US exclusive; published by Romstar
Victorious Nine II	1987	No	MSX		
Continental Circus (コンチネンタルサーカス, Konchinentaru Sākasu)	March 1988	Yes	Amiga, Amstrad CPC, Atari ST, Commodore 64, MSX, IBM PC, PlayStation 2, ZX Spectrum, Xbox		
Dr. Toppel's Adventure (Dr. ドッペル探検隊, Dokutā Hakase Topperu Tankentai)	March 1988	Yes	—N/a		
Rainbow Islands: The Story of Bubble Bobble 2 (レインボーアイランド, Reinbō Airando)	March 1988	Yes	Amiga, Amstrad CPC, Atari ST, Commodore 64, FM Towns, Game Boy Color, NES, IBM PC, PC Engine CD-ROM², PlayStation, PlayStation 2, Master System, ZX Spectrum, Wonderswan, Xbox, Xbox Live Arcade		
Kurikinton (功里金団)	July 1988	Yes	PC, PlayStation 2, PSP, Xbox		
Operation Wolf (オペレーションウルフ, Operēshon Urufu)	December 1988	Yes	Amiga, Amstrad CPC, Atari ST, Commodore 64, MS-DOS, MSX, NES, PC, PlayStation 2, Master System, ZX Spectrum, PC Engine, Virtual Console, Xbox		
Akira	December 24, 1988	No	NES		Developed by Tose
Bonze Adventure	1988	Yes	PC, PC Engine, PlayStation 2, Virtual Console, Xbox	Jigoku Meguri (地獄めぐり; "Hell Tour")	
Chase H.Q. (チェイスH.Q., Cheisu H.Q.)	1988	Yes	Amiga, Amstrad CPC, Atari ST, Commodore 64, Game Boy, Game Gear, MSX, NES, PlayStation 2 (Taito Memories II Volume 2), Master System, ZX Spectrum, SNES, TurboGrafx-16, Virtual Console		
Cloud Master	1988	Yes	MSX, NES, PlayStation 2 (Taito Memories II Volume 1), Master System	Chūka Taisen (中華大戦)	Developed by Hot-B
Cyber Tank (サイバータンク, Saibā Tanku)	1988	Yes	—N/a		
Enforce (エンフォース, Enfōsu)	1988	Yes	—N/a		
Fighting Hawk (ファイティングホーク, Faitingu Hōku)	1988	Yes	PlayStation 2 (Taito Memories II Volume 1)		
Final Blow (ファイナルブロー, Fainaru Burō)	1988	Yes	Amiga, Atari ST, Commodore 64, Mega Drive		
Recordbreaker	1988	Yes	—N/a	Go for the Gold (ゴーフォーザゴールド, Gō fōza Gōrudo)	
Heavy Unit (ヘビーユニット, Hebii Yunitto)	1988	Yes	Sega Mega Drive, PC Engine		Developed by Kaneko
Kabuki-Z (歌舞伎Z)	1988	Yes	—N/a		Developed by Kaneko
Kageki (火激)	1988	Yes	Sega Mega Drive		Developed by Kaneko
Rastan Saga II (ラスタンサーガII, Rasutan Sāga II)	1989	Yes	PC, PlayStation 2, Sega Mega Drive, PC Engine, Virtual Console, Xbox	Nastar (EU) Nastar Warrior (NA arcade)	
The New Zealand Story (ニュージーランドストーリー, Nyūjīrando Sutōrī)	1988	Yes	Amiga, Amstrad CPC, Atari ST, Commodore 64, FM Towns, PC, PlayStation 2, PSP, Mega Drive, X68000, ZX Spectrum, NES, Master System, PC Engine, Virtual Console, Xbox	Kiwi Kraze (NA)	
The Ninja Warriors (ニンジャウォーリアーズ, Ninja Uōriāzu)	1988	Yes	Amiga, Amstrad CPC, Atari ST, Commodore 64, Sega CD, ZX Spectrum, PC Engine, Virtual Console		
Operation Thunderbolt (オペレーションサンダーボルト, Operēshon Sandāboruto)	1988	Yes	Amiga, Amstrad CPC, Atari ST, Commodore 64, PC, PlayStation 2, ZX Spectrum, SNES, Xbox		
Raimais (レイメイズ, Reimeizu)	1988	Yes	PC, PlayStation 2, PSP, Xbox		
Rainbow Islands Extra (レインボーアイランドエクストラ, Reinbō Airando Ekusutora)	1988	Yes	PlayStation 2 (Taito Memories II Volume 2), PSP (Taito Memories Pocket), Sega Mega Drive		
Rally Bike	1988	Yes	NES	Dash Rascal (ダッシュ野郎, Dasshu Yarō)	Developed by Toaplan
Superman (スーパーマン, Sūpāman)	1988	Yes	—N/a		
Syvalion (サイバリオン, Saibarion)	1988	Yes	PlayStation 2, SNES		
Top Landing (トップランディング, Toppu Randingu)	1988	Yes	—N/a		
Truxton	1988	Yes	Sega Mega Drive, PC Engine	Tatsujin (達人; "Expert")	Developed by Toaplan
Hellfire (ヘルファイアー, Herufaiā)	April 1989	Yes			Developed by Toaplan
Asuka & Asuka (飛鳥＆飛鳥)	1989	Yes	PlayStation 2 (Taito Memories II Volume 1)		
Bakushō!! Jinsei Gekijō	1989	No	NES		
Battle Shark (バトルシャーク, Batoru Shāku)	1989	Yes	PC, PlayStation 2, Xbox		
Bari Bari Densetsu	1989	No	PC Engine		
Cadash (カダッシュ, Kadasshu)	1989	Yes	PC, PlayStation 2 (Taito Memories Volume 2), Sega Mega Drive, TurboGrafx-16, Virtual Console, Xbox		
Cameltry (キャメルトライ, Kyameroturai)	1989	Yes	FM Towns, PC, PlayStation 2, SNES, X68000, Xbox	On The Ball Labyrinth	
Champion Wrestler (チャンピオンレスラー, Chanpion Resurā)	1989	Yes	PlayStation 2 (Taito Memories II Volume 1), PC Engine, Virtual Console		
Crime City (クライムシティ, Kuraimu Shiti)	1989	Yes	—N/a		
Darius II (ダライアスII, Daraiasu II)	1989	Yes	PlayStation 2 (Taito Memories II Volume 1), Master System, Sega Mega Drive, Sega Saturn, PC Engine CD-ROM, Virtual Console	Sagaia	
Demon's World	1989	Yes	PC Engine	Horror Story (ホラーストーリー, Horā Sutōrī)	Developed by Toaplan
Don Doko Don (ドンドコドン)	1989	Yes	Famicom, PC, PlayStation 2, PC Engine, Xbox		
Insector X (インセクターX, Insekutā X)	1989	Yes	PC, PlayStation 2, Sega Mega Drive, NES, Xbox		Developed by Hot-B
Master of Weapon (マスターオブウェポン, Masutā obu Uepon)	1989	Yes	Mega Drive, PlayStation 2 (Taito Memories II Volume 2)	Yukiwo (prototype)	
Maze of Flott (メイズオブフロット, Meizu obu Furotto)	1989	Yes	—N/a		
MegaBlast (メガブラスト, Megaburasuto)	1989	Yes	PlayStation 2 (Taito Memories II Volume 2)		
Night Striker (ナイトストライカー, Naito Sutoraikā)	1989	Yes	PlayStation, PlayStation 2 (Taito Memories II Volume 2), Sega CD, Sega Saturn		
Plotting	1989	Yes	Amiga, Amstrad CPC, GX4000, Atari ST, Commodore 64, Game Boy, NES, PC, PlayStation 2, ZX Spectrum, Xbox	Flipull (フリップル, Furippuru)	
Puzznic (パズニック, Pazunikku)	1989	Yes	Amiga, Amstrad CPC, Atari ST, Apple IIGS, Commodore 64, Mobile Phone, MS-DOS, FM Towns, Game Boy, MSX, NEC PC-9801, NES, X68000, ZX Spectrum, PC Engine		
Rambo III (ランボーIII, Ranbō III)	1989	Yes	Amiga, Atari ST, Commodore 64, MS-DOS, MSX, Master System, Sega Mega Drive, ZX Spectrum		
Special Criminal Investigation	1989	Yes	Amiga, Atari ST, Commodore 64, PlayStation 2 (Taito Memories II Volume 1), Master System, ZX Spectrum, PC Engine, Virtual Console	Chase HQ II: Special Criminal Investigation (some home ports) S.C.I.	
Taito Grand Prix: Eikō Heno Licence	1989	No	Famicom		
Toki	1989	Yes	Amiga, Amstrad CPC, Atari Lynx, Atari ST, Commodore 64, Microsoft Windows, NES, PlayStation Network, Sega Mega Drive, ZX Spectrum, WiiWare, Xbox Live Arcade	JuJu Densetsu (JuJu伝説)	Taito developed and published the NES version under license from its arcade developer, TAD Corporation
Twin Hawk	1989	Yes	PC Engine, Sega Mega Drive, PC Engine CD-ROM²	Daisenpū (だいせんぷう; "Great Whirlwind")	
Violence Fight (バイオレンスファイト, Baiorensu Faito)	1989	Yes	PC, PlayStation 2, Xbox		
Volfied (ヴォルフィード, Vuorufīdo)	May 16, 1989	Yes	Amiga, Atari ST, Commodore 64, MS-DOS, Java ME, PC, PlayStation 2, Sega Mega Drive, PC Engine, Virtual Console, Xbox	Ultimate Qix (NA Genesis port)	
WGP Real Race Feeling (WGP)	1989	Yes	—N/a		
Target: Renegade	March 1990	No	NES		North American exclusive
Aa Eikō no Kōshien (嗚呼栄光の甲子園)	1990	Yes	PlayStation 2 (Taito Memories Volume 1)		
Air Inferno (エアインフェルノ, Ea Inferuno)	1990	Yes	—N/a		
American Horseshoes	1990	Yes	—N/a		Developed by Taito America
Aqua Jack (アクアジャック, Akua Jakku)	1990	Yes	—N/a		
Ashura Blaster (阿修羅ブラスター, Ashura Burasutā)	1990	Yes	—N/a		
Darius Alpha	1990	No	PC Engine		
Demon Sword	1990	No	NES		
Dynamite League (ダイナマイトリーグ, Dainamaito Rīgu)	1990	Yes	—N/a		
Football Champ	1990	Yes	Amiga, Atari ST, Commodore 64, PC, PlayStation 2, SNES, Xbox	Hat Trick Hero (ハットトリックヒーロー, Hatto Torikku Hīrō)	
Gals Panic (ギャルズパニック, Gyaruzu Panikku)	1990	Yes	—N/a		
Growl	1990	Yes	PC, PlayStation 2, Sega Mega Drive, Xbox	Runark (ルナーク, Runāku)	
Gun Frontier (ガンフロンティア, Gan Furontia)	1990	Yes	PC, PlayStation 2, Sega Saturn, Xbox		
Liquid Kids	1990	Yes	Amiga, PC, PC Engine, PlayStation 2, Sega Saturn, Virtual Console, Xbox	Mizubaku Adventure (ミズバク大冒険, Mizubaku Daibōken)	
Minivaders (ミニベーダー, Minibēdā)	1990	Yes	—N/a		No audio or scoring. Simple JAMMA test board (similar to Sega's Dottori-kun).
The Ninja Kids (ニンジャキッズ, Ninja Kizzu)	1990	Yes	PC, PlayStation 2, Xbox		
Palamedes (パラメデス, Paramedesu)	1990	Yes	FM Towns, Game Boy, MSX, NES		
Parasol Stars: The Story of Rainbow Islands II	1990	No	Amiga, Atari ST, Game Boy, NES, TurboGrafx-16, Virtual Console		
Quiz H.Q. (クイズH.Q., Kuizu H.Q.)	1990	Yes	—N/a		
Quiz Torimonochō (苦胃頭捕物帳, Kui Torimono)	1990	Yes	—N/a		
Shadow of the Ninja	1990	No	NES, Virtual Console		
Sonic Blast Man (ソニックブラストマン, Sonikku Burasuto Man)	1990	Yes	SNES		
Space Gun (スペースガン, Supēsu Gan)	1990	Yes	Amiga, Atari ST, Commodore 64, PC, PlayStation 2, Master System, ZX Spectrum, Xbox		
Space Invaders 90	1990	No	Sega Mega Drive		
Space Invaders: Fukkatsu no Hi (スペースインベーダー復活の日, Supēsu Inbēdā Fukkatsu no Hi)	1990	No	PC Engine, Virtual Console	Space Invaders Day of Resurrection	
Success Joe ((あしたのジョー, Ashita no Jō)	1990	Yes	—N/a		
Majestic Twelve: The Space Invaders Part IV (マジェスティックトゥエルブ, Majesutikku Touerubu)	1990	Yes	Amiga, Amstrad CPC, Atari ST, Commodore 64, MS-DOS, PC, PlayStation 2, Master System, ZX Spectrum, Xbox	Super Space Invaders '91 (EU)	
ThunderFox (サンダーフォックス, SandāFokkusu)	1990	Yes	PC, PlayStation 2, Sega Mega Drive, Xbox		
WGP Real Race Feeling 2 (WGP 2)	1990	Yes	—N/a		
Wrath of the Black Manta	1990	No	NES		
Yes/No Shinri Tokimeki Chart (Yes/No心理トキメキチャート, Yes/No Shinri Tokimeki Chāto)	1990	Yes	—N/a		
Yūyu no Quiz de GO! GO! (ゆうゆのクイズでGO!GO!)	1990	Yes	SNES		
Ghox (ゴークス, Gōkusu)	November 1991	Yes	—N/a		Developed by Toaplan
Hana Tāka Daka!? (はなたーかだか!?)	1991	No	PC Engine		
Acrobat Mission (アクロバットミッション, Akurobatto Misshon)	1991	Yes	SNES		Developed by UPL
Bakushō!! Jinsei Gekijō 2	1991	No	NES		
Bakushō!! Jinsei Gekijō 3	1991	No	NES		
Darius Twin	1991	No	SNES		
Double Axle	1991	Yes	—N/a	Power Wheels (パワーホイールズ, Pawā Hoīruzu) (JP)	
The Flintstones: The Rescue of Dino & Hoppy	1991	No	NES		
Galactic Storm (ギャラクティックストーム, Gyarakutikku Sutōmu)	March 1992	Yes	—N/a		
Halley Wars	1991	No	NES, Game Gear		
Hit the Ice (アイスを打つ, Aisu o Utsu)	1991	Yes	Game Boy, NES, Sega Mega Drive, SNES, TurboGrafx-16		
Indiana Jones and the Last Crusade	1991	No	Game Boy, NES		
Knight Quest	1991	No	Game Boy		
Mahjong Quest (麻雀クエスト, Mājan Kuesuto)	1991	Yes	—N/a		
Metal Black (メタルブラック, Metaru Burakku)	1991	Yes	PC, PlayStation 2, Sega Saturn, Xbox	Project Gun Frontier 2	
Mystical Fighter	1991	No	Sega Mega Drive		
Power Blade	1991	No	NES		
Pu·Li·Ru·La (プリルラ, Purirura)	1991	Yes	FM Towns Marty, PlayStation, PlayStation 2 (Taito Memories Volume 1), Sega Saturn		
Quiz Quest - Hime to Yūsha no Monogatari (クイズクエスト-姫と勇者の物語)	1991	Yes	—N/a		
Racing Beat (レーシングビート, Rēshingu Bīto)	1991	Yes	—N/a		
Saint Sword	1991	No	Sega Mega Drive		
Solitary Fighter (ひとりだけのファイター, Hitori Dake no Faitā)	1991	Yes	—N/a		
Warrior Blade: Rastan Saga Episode III (ウォーリアーブレイド, U~ōriā Bureido)	1991	Yes	PlayStation 2 (Taito Memories II Volume 2)		
The Adventures of Star Saver	1992	No	Game Boy		
Arabian Magic (アラビアンマジック, Arabian Majikku)	1992	Yes	PC, PlayStation 2, Xbox		
Super Chase H.Q.	1992	Yes	SNES	Super Chase: Criminal Termination (スーパーチェイスクリミナルターミネーション, Sūpā Cheisu Kuriminaru Tāminēshon)	
Daibakushō Jinsei Gekijō	1992	No	SNES		
Dead Connection (デッドコネクション, Deddo Konekushon)	1992	Yes	—N/a		
Dino Rex (ディノレックス, Dino Rekkusu)	1992	Yes	PlayStation 2 (Taito Memories II Volume 1)		
Don Doko Don 2	1992	No	NES		
Euro Champ '92 (ユーロチャンプ'92, Yūro Chanpu '92)	1992	Yes	—N/a		
Gambler Jiko Chūsinha: Mahjong Puzzle Collection	1992	No	PC Engine		
Ground Effects (グラウンドエフェ, Guraundo Efe)	1992	Yes	SNES		
Gunbuster (ガンバスター, Ganbasutā)	1992	Yes	—N/a		
Hat Trick Hero '93 (ハットトリックヒーロー'93, Hatto Torikku Hīrō '93)	1992	Yes	—N/a	Taito Cup Finals	
The Jetsons: Cogswell's Caper!	1992	No	NES		
The Jetsons: Robot Panic	1992	No	Game Boy		
Kick Master	1992	No	NES		
Quiz Chikyū Bōeigun (クイズ地球防衛軍, Kuizu Chikyū Bōeigun; "Earth Defense Force Quiz")	February 1992	Yes	—N/a		
Quiz Jinsei Gekijō (クイズ人生劇場, Kuizu Jinsei Gekijō; "Theater Life Quiz")	1992	Yes	—N/a		
Little Samson	1992	No	NES		
Monkey Mole Panic	September 1992	Yes	—N/a	Waiwai Animal Land (わいわいアニマルランド)	Developed by Nakanihon / East Technology
Panic Restaurant	1992	No	NES		
Power Blade 2	1992	No	NES	Captain Saver (キャプテンセイバー, Kyaputen Seibā)	
Riding Fight (ライディングファイト, Raidingu Faito)	1992	Yes	—N/a		
Ring Rage (リングレイジ, Ringu Reiji)	1992	Yes	Game Boy		
Silent Dragon (サイレントドラゴン, Sairento Doragon)	1992	Yes	—N/a		
Grid Seeker: Project Storm Hammer (グリッドシーカー, Guriddo Shīkā)	December 1992	Yes	PC, PlayStation 2, Xbox		
Bubble Bobble Part 2	1993	No	Game Boy, NES	Bubble Bobble Junior (Game Boy)	
Cyber Sterra (サイバーステラ, Saibā Sutera)	1993	Yes	—N/a		
Daibakushō Jinsei Gekijō: Dokidoki Seishun	1993	No	SNES		
Darius Force	1993	No	SNES	Super Nova (NA)	
Dungeon Magic	1993	Yes	PC, PlayStation 2, Xbox	Light Bringer (ライトブリンガー, Light Bringer) (JP and some EU releases)	
Exciting Animal Land Jr.	1993	Yes	—N/a	Waiwai Animal Land Jr. (ワイワイアニマルランドJr., Waiwai Animaru Rando Jr.) Animalandia Jr. (Spanish)	Developed by Nakanihon / East Technology
The First Funky Fighter (ザファーストファンキーファイター, Za Fāsuto Fankī Faitā)	1993	Yes	—N/a		
The Flintstones	1993	No	Sega Mega Drive		
The Flintstones: King Rock Treasure Island	1993	No	Game Boy		
The Flintstones: The Surprise at Dinosaur Peak	1993	No	NES		
Gensō Tairiku Aurelia	1993	No	PC Engine CD-ROM²		
International Tennis Tour	1993	No	SNES		
Lufia & The Fortress of Doom	1993	No	SNES		
Prime Time Fighter	1993	Yes	—N/a	Top Ranking Stars (トップランキングスターズ, Toppu Rankingu Sutāzu)	
Quiz Crayon Shin-chan (クイズクレヨンしんちゃん, Kuizu Kureyon Shin-chan)	1993	Yes	—N/a		
Quiz Crayon Shin-chan Orato Asobu (クイズクレヨンしんちゃん2オラと遊ぼ, Kuizu Kureyon Shin-chan 2 Orato Asobo)	1993	Yes	—N/a		
Quiz Sekai wa SHOW by Shobai (クイズ世界はSHOWbyショーバイ!!, Kuizu Shōbai ni Yotte Sekai wa Shō!!)	1993	Yes	—N/a		
RayForce (レイフォース, ReiFōsu)	1993	Yes	iOS, Sega Saturn, PC, PlayStation 2 (Taito Memories II Volume 1), Xbox	Gunlock (EU arcade) Layer Section (JP home port) Galactic Attack (NA/EU home port)	
Ryū Jin (龍神; "Dragon God")	1993	Yes	—N/a		
Super Cup Finals (スーパーカップファイナル, Sūpā Kappu Fainaru)	1993	Yes	—N/a		
Tube It	1993	Yes	PC, PlayStation 2 and Xbox (Taito Legends)	Cachat (カチャシト, Kachashito)	
Under Fire (アンダーファイアー, Andā Faiā)	1993	Yes	—N/a		
Bubble Symphony (バブルシンフォニー, Baburu Shinfonī)	1994	Yes	PC, PlayStation 2 (Taito Memories II Volume 2), Sega Saturn, Xbox		
Chase Bombers (チェイスボンバーズ, Cheisu Bonbāzu)	1994	Yes	—N/a		
Daibakushō Jinsei Gekijō: Ooedo Nikki	1994	No	SNES		
Darius Gaiden (ダライアス外伝, Daraiasu Gaiden)	1994	Yes	PC, PlayStation, PlayStation 2, Sega Saturn, Xbox		
Elevator Action Returns (エレベーターアクションリターンズ, Erebētā Akushon Ritānzu)	1994	Yes	PC, PlayStation 2, Sega Saturn, Xbox	Elevator Action II	
The Flintstones: The Treasure of Sierra Madrock	1994	No	SNES		
Kaiser Knuckle (カイザーナックル, Kaizā Nakkuru)	1994	Yes	—N/a	Global Champion	
Hat Trick Hero 2	1994	No	SNES		
Hat Trick Hero '94 (ハットトリックヒーロー'94, Hatto Torikku Hīrō '94)	1994	Yes	—N/a	International Cup '94	
The Jetsons: Invasion of the Planet Pirates	1994	No	SNES		
The Ninja Warriors Again	1994	No	SNES	Ninja Warriors (NA) Ninja Warriors: New Generation (EU)	
Operation Wolf 3 (オペレーションウルフ3, Operēshon Urufu 3)	1994	Yes	—N/a		
Power Spikes II (パワースパイクII, Pawā Supaiku II)	1994	Yes	Neo Geo CD, Neo Geo MVS		
Puzzle Bobble (パズルボブル, Pazuru Boburu)	1994	Yes	3DO Interactive Multiplayer, IBM PC, IiOS, Java ME, Windows, Mobile Phone, MS-DOS, N-Gage, Neo Geo CD, Neo Geo MVS, Neo Geo Pocket Color, PSP, Game Gear, SNES, VG Pocket Caplet, Virtual Console, Xbox Live Arcade	Bust-a-Move (NA)	
Quiz 365 (クイズ365)	1994	Yes	—N/a		
Quiz Theater: Mittsu no Monogatari (クイズシアター3つの物語, Kuizu Shiatā 3tsu no Monogatari)	1994	Yes	—N/a		
Real Puncher (リアルパンチャー, Riaru Panchā)	1994	Yes	—N/a		
Slap Shot (スラップショット, Surappu Shotto)	1994	Yes	—N/a		
Sonic Blast Man II (ソニックブラストマンII, Sonikku Burasuto Man Tsū)	March 18, 1994	No	SNES		
Space Invaders DX (スペースインベーダーDX, Supēsu Inbēdā DX)	1994	Yes	Nuon, PC, PlayStation 2, Sega Saturn, SNES, PC Engine, Xbox		
Taito Power Goal	1994	Yes	Sega Saturn	Hat Trick Hero '95 (ハットトリックヒーロー'95, Hatto Torikku Hīrō '95)	
Daibakushō Jinsei Gekijō: Zukkoke Salary Man Hen	1995	No	SNES		
Dangerous Curves (デンジャラスカーブス, Denjarasu Kābusu)	1995	Yes	—N/a		
Gekirindan (逆鱗弾)	1995	Yes	PC, PlayStation 2, Sega Saturn, Xbox		
Hat Trick Hero S	1995	No	Sega Saturn		
Jupiter Strike	1995	No	PC, PlayStation	Zeitgeist (JP)	
Lady Stalker: Challenge from the Past	1995	No	SNES		
Landing Gear (ランディングギア, Randingu Gia)	1995	Yes	—N/a		
Lufia II: Rise of the Sinistrals	1995	No	SNES		
Moriguchi Hiroko no Quiz de Hyū Hyū (森口博子のクイズでヒューヒュー, Moriguchi Hiroko no Kuizu de Hyū Hyū)	1995	Yes	—N/a		
PD Ultraman Invaders	1995	No	PlayStation		
Psychic Force (サイキックフォース, Saikikku Fōsu)	1995	Yes	PlayStation, Sega Dreamcast		
Puzzle Bobble 2 (パズルボブル2, Pazuru Boburu 2)	1995	Yes	Apple Macintosh, Game Boy, Microsoft Windows, MS-DOS, Neo Geo MVS, Nintendo 64, PC, PlayStation, PlayStation 2, Sega Saturn, Xbox	Bust-a-Move 2 (NA) Bust-a-Move Again (NA)	
Pyramid Intruder	1995	No	3DO Interactive Multiplayer		
Space Invaders '95: The Attack of the Lunar Loonies	1995	Yes	PC, PlayStation 2, Xbox	Akkan-vaders (あっかんべぇだぁ, Akkanbēdā)	
Space Invaders Virtual Collection	1995	No	Virtual Boy		
Twin Cobra II	1995	Yes	—N/a	Kyūkyoku Tiger II (究極タイガーII, Kyūkyoku Taigā Tsū; "Ultimate Tiger II")	
Bubble Memories: The Story of Bubble Bobble III (バブルメモリーズ, Baburu Memorīzu)	February 1996	Yes	PlayStation 2 (Taito Memories II Volume 1)		
Chaos Seed: Fūsui Kairoki	1996	No	SNES		
Cleopatra Fortune (クレオパトラフォーチュン, Kureopatora Fōchun)	1996	Yes	Mobile Phone, PC, PlayStation, PlayStation 2, Sega Dreamcast, Sega Saturn, Xbox		
Energy Breaker	1996	No	SNES		
Fighters' Impact (ファイターズインパクト, Faitāzu Inpakuto)	1996	Yes	—N/a		
Magical Date (まじかるでとドキドキ告白大作戦, Majikaru Dēto Dokidoki Kokuhaku dai Sakusen)	December 1996	Yes	Arcade, PlayStation		
Psychic Force EX (サイキックフォースEX, Saikikku Fōsu EX)	1996	Yes	—N/a		
Puzzle Bobble 3 (パズルボブル3, Pazuru Boburu 3)	1996	Yes	Game Boy, Microsoft Windows, Nintendo 64, PlayStation	Bust-a-Move 3 (NA) Bust-a-Move 3 DX (EU home ports) Bust-a-Move '99 (NA home ports) Puzzle Bobble 64 (JP N64) Puzzle Bobble 3 DX (JP PS1)	
RayStorm (レイストーム, ReiSutōmu)	1996	Yes	iOS, Windows, PlayStation, PlayStation 2, PlayStation Network, Saturn, Xbox Live Arcade		
Side by Side (サイドバイサイド, Saido bai Saido)	1996	Yes	PlayStation		
Super Football Champ (スーパーハットトリックヒーロー, Sūpā Hatto Torikku Hīrō)	1996	Yes	—N/a		
Arkanoid Returns (アルカノイドリターンズ, Arukanoido Ritānzu)	1997	Yes	PlayStation, PlayStation Network	Arkanoid R 2000 (PlayStation port)	
Densha de Go! (電車でGO!; "Go by Train!")	1997	Yes	Game Boy Color, PC, PlayStation, WonderSwan		
Densha de Go! EX (電車でGO! EX; "Go by Train! EX")	1997	Yes	Sega Saturn		
Fighters' Impact A (ファイターズインパクトA, Faitāzu Inpakuto A)	1997	Yes	—N/a		
G-Darius (Gダライアス, G Daraiasu)	1997	Yes	PC, PlayStation, PlayStation 2, PlayStation Network		
Kirameki Star Road - Intro Club (きらめきスターロード♪イントロ倶楽部♪, Kirameki Sutā Rōdo ♪ Intoro Kurabu ♪)	1997	Yes	—N/a		
Magical Date EX (まじかるでと卒業告白大作戦, Majikaru Dēto Sotsugyō Kokuhaku dai Sakusen)	1997	Yes	—N/a		
Pop'n Pop (ぽっぷんぽっぷ, Potsu Pun Potsu Pu)	1997	Yes	Game Boy Color, PlayStation. PC and Xbox (Taito Legends 2)		
Puchi Carat (プチカラット, Puchi Karatto)	1997	Yes	Game Boy Color, PC, PlayStation, PlayStation 2, Xbox		
Puzzle De Pon! R (パズルdeポン!R, Pazuru de Pon! R)	1997	Yes	Neo Geo MVS		
Ray Tracers	1997	No	PlayStation		
Side by Side 2 Evoluzione (サイドバイサイド2エボルツィオーネ, Saido bai Saido 2 Eborutsu~iōne)	1997	Yes	—N/a		
Side by Side Special	1997	No	PlayStation		
Chaos Heat (カオスヒート, Kaosu Hīto)	1998	Yes	—N/a		
Densha de Go! 2 Kōsoku-hen (電車でGO!2高速編)	1998	Yes	PC, PlayStation		
Densha de Go! 2 Kōsoku-hen 3000-bandai (電車でGO!2高速編3000番台)	1998	Yes	PC, Sega Dreamcast, Nintendo 64	Densha de Go! 64 (N64)	
Land Maker (ランドメーカー, Rando Mēkā)	1998	Yes	PlayStation, PlayStation Network	Builder's Block (NA)	
Operation Tiger (オペレーションタイガー, Operēshon Taigā)	1998	Yes	—N/a		
Psychic Force 2012 (サイキックフォース2012, Saikikku Fōsu 2012)	1998	Yes	PlayStation, PlayStation 2, PlayStation Network, Sega Dreamcast		
Puzzle Bobble 4 (パズルボブル4, Pazuru Boburu 4)	1998	Yes	Game Boy Color, Microsoft Windows, PlayStation, Sega Dreamcast	Bust-a-Move 4	
RayCrisis (レイクライシス, ReiKuraishisu)	1998	Yes	Microsoft Windows, PlayStation, PlayStation Network	RayCrisis: Series Termination (NA)	
Battle Gear (バトルギア, Batoru Gia)	1999	Yes	—N/a		
Classic Bubble Bobble	1999	No	Game Boy Color		
Densha de Go! Professional	1999	No	PC, PlayStation	Go by Train! Professional	
Flip Maze (フリップメイズ, Furippu Meizu)	1999	Yes	—N/a		
Landing High Japan (ランディングハイジャパン, Randingu Hai Japan)	1999	Yes	—N/a		
Mahjong OH (麻雀OH)	1999	Yes	—N/a		
Mawasunda!! (まわすんだ～！！)	1999	Yes	—N/a	Turn It Around	
Power Shovel Simulator (パワーショベルに乗ろう!!, Pawā Shoberu ni Norou!!)	1999	Yes	PlayStation		
Side by Side Special 2000	1999	No	PlayStation		
Super Puzzle Bobble (スーパーパズルボブル, Sūpā Pazuru Boburu)	1999	Yes	Game Boy Advance, GameCube, PC, PlayStation 2	Super Bust-a-Move (EU/NA)	
Battle Gear 2 (バトルギア2, Batoru Gia 2)	2000	Yes	PlayStation 2		
Chaos Break	2000	No	PlayStation		
Chase H.Q.: Secret Police	2000	No	Game Boy Color		
Cosmo Warrior Zero	2000	No	PlayStation		
Densha de Go! 3 Tsūkin-hen (電車でGO!3通勤編)	2000	Yes	PlayStation 2		
Densha de Go! 3 Tsūkin-hen Daiya Kaisei (電車でGO!3通勤編ダイヤ改正)	2000	Yes	PC		
Densha de Go! Nagoya Tetsudō-hen (電車でGO! 名古屋鉄道編; "Go by Train! Nagoya Railway Edition")	2000	No	PC, PlayStation		
Densha de Go! Ryojōhen (電車でGO!旅情編)	2000	Yes	PC, PlayStation 2		
Ganbare Untenshi!! (がんばれ運転士!!)	2000	Yes	—N/a		
Jet de Go!	2000	No	PC, PlayStation	Go by Jet!	
Kisha de Go!	2000	No	PC, PlayStation		
Monkey Puncher (さるパンチャー Saru Panchā)	2000	No	Game Boy Color		
Qix Adventure	2000	No	Game Boy Color		
Rainbow Islands: Putty's Party	2000	No	WonderSwan		
RC de Go! (RCでGO!; "Go by RC")	2000	Yes	PlayStation		
Shanghai: Shōryū Sairin (上海:昇龍再臨)	2000	Yes	—N/a		
Sōtenryū (蒼天リュウ)	2000	Yes	—N/a		
Stunt Typhoon (スタント台風, Sutanto Taifū)	2000	Yes	—N/a		
Cleopatra Fortune Plus (クレオパトラフォーチュン+, Kureopatora Fōchun +)	2001	Yes	—N/a		
Densha de Go! Shinkansen Sanyō Shinkansen-hen	2001	No	Wii, PC, PlayStation 2		
Hajime no Ippo: The Fighting (はじめの一歩THE FIGHTING!, Hajime no Ippo Faitingu!)	2001	Yes	Game Boy Advance, Nintendo DS, PlayStation		
Hard Puncher: Hajime no Ippo 2 (ハードパンチャーはじめの一歩, Hādo Panchā Hajime no Ippo)	2001	Yes	PlayStation 2		
International League Soccer	2001	No	PlayStation 2		
Lufia: The Legend Returns	2001	No	Game Boy Color		
Night Raid (ナイトレイド, Naito Reido)	2001	Yes	PlayStation		
Qix Neo	2001	No	PlayStation		
Stunt Typhoon Plus (スタント台風プラス, Sutanto Taifū Purasu)	2001	Yes	—N/a		
Usagi (兎)	2001	Yes	—N/a		
Weather Tales (気象テイルズ, Kishō Teirezu)	2001	Yes	—N/a		
XII Stag (トゥエルブスタッグ, Touerubu Sutaggu)	2002	Yes	PlayStation 2		
Azumanga Daioh Puzzle Bobble (あずまんが大王パズルボブル, Azumanga Daiō Pazuru Boburu)	2002	Yes	—N/a		
Battle Gear 3 (バトルギア3, Baturo Gia 3)	2002	Yes	PlayStation 2		
Battle Qix (バトルクイックス, Batoru Kuikkusu)	2002	No	—N/a		
Darius R	2002	No	Game Boy Advance		
Elevator Action Old & New	2002	No	Game Boy Advance		
Jet de Go! 2	2002	No	PlayStation 2, PC	Go by Jet! 2	
Lufia: The Ruins of Lore	2002	No	Game Boy Advance		
Magic Pengel: The Quest for Color	2002	No	PlayStation 2		
Quiz Keitai Q Mode (クイズケータイQモードMailもChatも恋しTel, Kuizu Kētai Q Mōdomēru mo Chatto mo Koishi Denwa)	2002	Yes	—N/a		
Raizin Ping Pong (ライジンピンポン, Raijin Pin Pon)	2002	Yes	—N/a		
Shanghai: Sangokuhai Tōgi (上海:三國牌闘戯)	2002	Yes	—N/a		
Space Raiders	2002	No	GameCube, PlayStation 2		
Super Puzzle Bobble 2	2002	No	PlayStation 2	Super Bust-a-Move 2 (EU/NA)	
Tokyo Road Race	2002	No	PlayStation 2		
Battle Gear 3 Tuned (バトルギア3チューニング, Batoru Gia 3 Chūningu)	2003	Yes	—N/a		
Battle Gear 3 Limited Edition	2002	No	PlayStation 2		
Bubble Bobble: Old & New	2003	No	Game Boy Advance		
Bujingai	2003	No	PlayStation 2		
Castle Shikigami 2 (式神の城II, Shikigami no Shiro II)	2003	Yes	—N/a		
Densha de Go! Professional 2	2003	No	PC, PlayStation 2	Go by Train Professional 2	
Dino King Battle 2 (ディノキングバトル2, Dino Kingu Batoru 2)	2003	Yes	—N/a		
Pochi & Nyaa (ポチッとにゃ, Pochitto Nyā)	2003	Yes	Neo Geo MVS, PlayStation 2		
Space Invaders Anniversary (スペースインベーダーアニバーサリー, Supēsu Inbēdā Anibāsarī)	2003	Yes	PC, PlayStation 2		
Train Simulator + Densha de Go! Tōkyō Kyūkō-hen	2003	No	PlayStation 2, PSP		
Usagi - Wild Fight - Mahjong (兎-野性の闘牌-山城麻雀編, Usagi - Yasei no Tōhai - Yamashiro Mājan)	2003	Yes	—N/a		
Chaos Breaker (カオスブレイカー, Kaosu Bureikā)	2004	Yes	—N/a		
Densha de Go! Final	2004	No	PC, PlayStation 2	Go by Train Final	
Giga Wing Generations (翼神GIGAWING GENERATIONS)	2004	Yes	PlayStation 2		Developed by Takumi
Puzzle Bobble Deluxe	2004	No	PSP, Xbox	Bust-a-Move Deluxe	
Trizeal (トライジール, Toraijīru)	2004	Yes	—N/a		
Bubblen Golf (バブルンゴルフ, Baburun Gorufu)	2004	No	Mobile Phone		
Battle Gear 4 (バトルギア4, Batoru Gia 4)	2005	Yes	—N/a		
Densha de Go! Pocket Yamanote sen-sen	2005	No	PSP		
Exit	2005	No	Nintendo DS, PSP, Xbox Live Arcade		
Graffiti Kingdom	2005	No	PlayStation 2		
Half-Life 2: Survivor (ハーフライフ2サバイバー, Hāfu-Raifu 2 Sabaibā)	2005	Yes	—N/a		
Harikiri Professional Baseball (ハリキリオンラインプロ野球, Harikiri Onrain Puro Yakyū)	2005	Yes	—N/a		
Homura (ほむら)	2005	Yes	PlayStation 2		
Jet de Go! Pocket	2005	No	PSP	Go by Jet! Pocket	
King of Jurassic (クキングオブジュラ紀, King obu Juraki)	2005	Yes	—N/a		
Psychic Force Complete	2005	No	PlayStation 2		
Bust-a-Move DS	2005	No	Nintendo DS	Hippatte!! Puzzle Bobble (ひっぱって!!パズルボブル, Hippatte!! Pazuru Boburu; "Pull Back!! Puzzle Bobble")	
Ultra Puzzle Bobble (ウルトラパズルボブル, Urutora Pazuru Boburu)	2005	No	Xbox		
Space Invaders Pocket	2005	No	PSP		
Space Invaders Revolution	2005	No	Nintendo DS		
Spica Adventure (スピカ★アドベンチャー, Supika ★ Adobenchā)	2005	Yes	—N/a		
Taito Legends	2005	No	PC, PlayStation 2, Xbox		
Taito Memories Volume 1	2005	No	PlayStation 2		
Taito Memories Volume 2	2005	No	PlayStation 2		
TRANCE PINBALL	2005	No	Mobile Phone		
Tetris: The Grand Master 3 - Terror Instinct (テトリスザグランドマスター3テラーインスティンクト, Tetorisu za Gurando Masutā 3 Terā Insutinkuto)	2005	Yes	—N/a		
Usagi - Wild Fight - Online (兎-野性の闘牌-ONLINE, Usagi - Yasei no Tōhai - Online)	2005	Yes	—N/a		
Zoids Card Coliseum (ゾイドカードコロシアム, Zoido Kādo Koroshiamu)	2005	Yes	—N/a		
Zoids Infinity EX (ゾイドインフィニティEX, Zoido Infiniti EX)	2005	Yes	—N/a		
Battle Gear 4 Tuned (バトルギア4チューニング, Batoru Gia 4 Chūningu)	2006	Yes	—N/a		
Castle of Shikigami III (式神の城III, Shikigami no Shiro III)	2006	Yes	—N/a		
Chase H.Q. 2 (チェイスH.Q.2, Cheisu H.Q. 2)	2006	Yes	—N/a		
Cooking Mama	2006	No	iOS, Nintendo DS		
Densha de Go! Pocket Chūō-sen-hen	2006	No	PSP		
Densha de Go! Pocket Ōsaka-kanjō-sen-hen	2006	No	PSP		
Densha de Go! Pocket Tōkaidō-sen-hen	2006	No	PSP		
Dino King Battle Card Game (ダイノキングバトル-CARD GAME-, Daino Kingu Batoru - CARD GĒMU - no)	2006	Yes	—N/a		
Dungeon Maker: Hunting Ground (クロニクル オブ ダンジョンメーカー, Chronicle of Dungeon Maker)	2006	No	—N/a		
Exit 2	2006	No	PSP, Xbox Live Arcade		
Ghost Castle (ゴーストキャッスル, Gōsuto Kyassuru)	2006	Yes	—N/a		
Ibara (鋳薔薇)	2006	No	PlayStation 2		
Kira Kira Idol Rika-chan (キラキラアイドルリカちゃん, Kira Kira Aidoru Rika-chan)	2006	Yes	—N/a		
LostMagic	2006	No	Nintendo DS		
Minna no Oshigoto (みんなのおしごと)	2006	Yes	—N/a		
Monster Bomber	2006	No	Nintendo DS		
Over G Fighters	2006	No	Xbox 360		
Rainbow Islands Revolution	2006	No	Nintendo DS, PSP		
Sekai Bikkuri Tankentai (世界ビックリ探検隊)	2006	Yes	—N/a		
Taitō Harikiri Daifugō (タイトーハリキリ大富豪)	2006	No	Mobile Phone		
Taito Legends 2	2006	No	PC, PlayStation 2, Xbox		
Taito Legends Power-Up	2006	No	PSP		
Taito Memories Pocket	2006	No	PSP		
Yawaraka Sensha VS Space Invaders	2006	No	Mobile Phone		
Zoids Infinity EX Plus (ゾイドインフィニティEX PLUS, Zoido Infiniti EX Plus)	2006	Yes	—N/a		
Aquarian Age Alternative (アクエリアンエイジオルタナティブ, Akuerian Eijio Rutanatibu)	2007	Yes	—N/a		
Cooking Mama: Cook Off	2007	No	Wii		
Cooking Mama 2: Dinner with Friends	2007	No	Nintendo DS		
Densha de Go! Shinkansen EX Sanyō Shinkansen-hen	2007	No	Wii		
Dino King Battle 3 Allosaurus (ディノキングバトル3アロサウルス, Dino Kingu Batoru 3 Arosaurusu)	2007	Yes	—N/a		
Dinomax (ディノマックス, Dinomakkusu)	2007	Yes	—N/a		
Furu Furu Park	2007	No	Wii		
The New Zealand Story Revolution	2007	No	Nintendo DS		
Bust-a-Move Bash!	2007	No	Wii		Not released in Japan
Raiden IV (雷電IV)	2007	Yes	—N/a		
Rainbow Islands Evolution	2007	No	PSP		
Space Invaders Pinball	2007	No	Mobile Phone		
Space Invaders Trilogy	2007	No	Mobile Phone		
Taito Memories II Volume 1	2007	No	PlayStation 2		
Taito Memories II Volume 2	2007	No	PlayStation 2		
Turn It Around!	2007	No	Nintendo DS		
Arkanoid DS	2008	No	Nintendo DS		
BlazBlue: Calamity Trigger (ブレイブルーカラミティトリガー, BureiBurū: Karamiti Torigā)	2008	Yes	PC, PlayStation 3, PSP, Xbox 360		
Cooking Mama: World Kitchen	2008	No	Wii		
D1GP Arcade	2008	Yes	—N/a		
Eternal Wheel (悠久の車輪, Yūkyū no Sharin)	2008	Yes	—N/a		
Lord of Vermilion (ロードオブヴァーミリオン, Rōdo obu Vāmirion)	2008	Yes	—N/a		
Space Invaders The Beat Attacker (スペースインベーダービートアタッカー, Supēsu Inbēdā Bīto Atakkā)	2008	Yes	—N/a		
Space Invaders Extreme	2008	No	Nintendo DS, PSP, Xbox Live Arcade		
Space Invaders Infinity Gene	2008	No	Android, iOS, Mobile phone, PlayStation Network, Xbox Live Arcade		
Usagi - Wild Fight - Online DD (兎-野性の闘牌-ONLINE DDの血統, Usagi - Yasei no Tōhai - ONLINE DD wa no Kettō)	2008	Yes	—N/a		
My Pet Shop (ペットショップ物語 DS, Petto shoppu monogatari DS)	2009	No	Nintendo DS		
Arkanoid Plus!	2009	No	WiiWare		
Bubble Bobble Plus!	2009	No	WiiWare		
Chō Chabudai Gaeshi! (超ちゃぶ台返し!)	2009	Yes	—N/a		
Cooking Mama 3: Shop & Chop	2009	No	Nintendo DS		
Cyber Diver (サイバーダイバー, Saibā Daibā)	2009	Yes	—N/a		
Dariusburst	2009	No	PSP		
Elevator Action Death Parade (エレベーターアクションデスパレード, Erebētā Akushon Desu Parēdo)	2009	No	—N/a		
Gardening Mama	2009	No	iOS, Nintendo DS		
Hopping Road (ホッピングロード, Hoppingu Rōdo)	2009	Yes	—N/a		
Lord of Vermilion 2 (ロードオブヴァーミリオン2, Rōdo obu Vāmirion 2)	2009	Yes	—N/a		
Music GunGun! (ミュージックガンガン!, Myūjikku GanGan!)	2009	Yes	—N/a		
Oppopo Boom!! (オッポポブーン!!, Oppopo Būn!!)	2009	Yes	—N/a		
Panic Museum	2009	Yes	—N/a	Haunted Museum (ホーンテッドミュージアム, Hōnteddo Myūjiamu)	
Puzzle Bobble Plus!	2009	No	WiiWare	Bust-a-Move Plus! (NA) Puzzle Bobble Wii (JP)	
Rainbow Islands: Towering Adventure!	2009	No	WiiWare		
Senior Nippon! (セニョールニッポン!, Senyōru Nippon!)	2009	Yes	—N/a		
Space Invaders Extreme 2	2009	No	Nintendo DS		
Space Invaders Get Even	2009	No	WiiWare		
Space Puzzle Bobble (スペース パズルボブル, Supēsu Pazuru Boburu)	2009	No	Nintendo DS	Space Bust-a-Move (NA) Puzzle Bobble Galaxy (EU)	
Takt of Magic	2009	No	Wii		
Top Speed (トップスピード, Toppu Supīdo)	2009	Yes	—N/a		
Trouble Witches - Episode 1 (トラブルウィッチーズAC, Toraburu Uitchīzu AC)	2009	Yes	—N/a		
With Tears for Everyone! (みんなでワツと!, Minna de Watsu to!)	2009	Yes	—N/a		
Babysitting Mama	2010	No	WiiWare		
BlazBlue: Continuum Shift (ブレイブルーコンティニュアムシフト, BureiBurū Kontinyuamu Shifuto)	2010	Yes	PlayStation 3, Xbox 360		
BlazBlue: Continuum Shift II (ブレイブルーコンティニュアムシフトII, BureiBurū Kontinyuamu Shifuto II)	2010	Yes	—N/a		
Chō Chabudai Gaeshi! 2 (超ちゃぶ台返し!その2)	2010	Yes	—N/a		
Dariusburst Another Chronicle (ダライアスバーストアナザークロニクル, Daraiasubāsuto Anazā Kuronikuru)	2010	Yes	—N/a		
Densha de Go! Special Version—Revived! Showa Yamanote Line	2010	No	Nintendo DS		
Gaia Attack 4 (ガイアアタックフォー, Gaia Atakku Fō)	2010	Yes	—N/a		
Happy Kentei (ハッピー検定, Happī Kentei)	2010	Yes	—N/a		
Hopping Road Kids (ホッピングロードキッズ, Hoppingu Rōdo Kizzu)	2010	Yes	—N/a		
Music GunGun! Full Version (ミュージックガンガン!曲がいっぱい☆超増加版!, Myūjikku GanGan! Kyoku ga Ippai ☆ Chō Zōkaban!)	2010	Yes	—N/a		
Qix++	2010	No	PSP, Xbox Live Arcade		
RayStorm HD	2010	No	PlayStation Network, Xbox Live Arcade		
Sonic Blast Heroes (ソニックブラストヒーローズ, Sonikku Burasuto Hīrōzu)	2010	Yes	—N/a		
Speed Rider (スピードライダー, Supīdo Raidā)	2010	Yes	—N/a		
The Tablecloth Hour (ザテーブルクロスアワー, Za Tēburukurosu Awā)	2010	Yes	—N/a		
Battle Gear Wheel Spin (バトルホイールスピンギア, Batoru Hoīru Supin Gia)	2011	Yes	—N/a		
Geki tō Densetsu Block King (激投伝説ブロックキング, Geki tō Densetsu Burokku Kingu; "Block King Ball Shooter")	2011	Yes	—N/a		
Chō Chabudai Gaeshi! Kyojin no Hoshi do Konjō-hen (超ちゃぶ台返し!巨人の星ド根性編)	2011	Yes	—N/a		
Dariusburst Another Chronicle EX (ダライアスバーストアナザークロニクルEX, Daraiasubāsuto Anazā Kuronikuru EX)	2011	Yes	—N/a		
DenGO! Yamanote Line	2011	No	iOS		
Drawin' Growin'	2011	No	iOS		
Elevator Action Deluxe	2011	No	PlayStation Network		
Groove Coaster	2011	Yes	iOS		
Kickthrough Racers (キックスルーレーサーズ, Kikkusurū Rēsāzu)	2011	Yes	—N/a		
Music GunGun! 2 (ミュージックガンガン!2, Myūjikku GanGan! 2)	2011	Yes	—N/a		
New Puzzle Bobble	2011	No	iOS	New Bust-a-Move	
Puzzle Bobble Online	2011	No	Microsoft Windows		
Puzzle Bobble Universe	2011	No	Nintendo 3DS	Bust-a-Move Universe (NA) Tobidasu! Puzzle Bobble 3D (とびだす!パズルボブル 3D, Tobidasu! Pazuru Boburu 3D) (JP)	
Real Puncher 2 (リアルパンチャー2, Riaru Panchā 2)	2011	Yes	—N/a		
Shh...! Welcome to Frightfearland	2011	Yes	—N/a	Haunted Museum II Yōkoso Gen'ei Yuenchi e (ホーンテッドミュージアムIIようこそ幻影遊園地へ, Hōnteddo Myūjiamu II Yōkoso Gen'ei Yuenchi e)	
Dariusburst Second Prologue	2012	No	iOS		
Kādo de Renketsu! Densha de GO! (カードで連結!電車でGO!)	2012	Yes	—N/a		
Magical Music (マジカルミュージック, Majikaru Myūjikku)	2012	Yes	—N/a		
Cooking Mama Seasons	2012	No	iOS		
Groove Coaster Zero	2012	No	iOS		
Gunslinger Stratos	2012	Yes	—N/a		
Crime Connection	2013	No	iOS, Android		
Gunslinger Stratos 2	2013	Yes	—N/a		
Left 4 Dead: Survivors (Left 4 Dead: 生存者たち Seizonshatachi)	2014	Yes		Left 4 Dead: Arcade (L4Dac)	
Bubblen March	2014	No	iOS, Android		
Gunslinger Stratos: Reloaded	2015	No	PC		
Gunslinger Stratos 3	2016	Yes	—N/a		
Arkanoid vs. Space Invaders (アルカノイド vs. スペースインベーダー Arukanoido vs. Supēsu Inbēdā)	2017	No	iOS, Android		
Dariusburst Chronicle Saviours	2017	No	PlayStation 4, PlayStation Vita, Steam		
Densha de Go!! (電車でGO!!)	2017	Yes	—N/a		
Darius Cozmic Collection	2019	No	Switch		
Bubble Bobble 4 Friends	2019	No	Switch		
Groove Coaster Wai Wai Party	2019	No	Switch		
Touhou Spell Bubble	2020	No	Switch		
Tetote Connect (テトテ×コネクト Tetote × konekuto)	2020	Yes	Arcade		
Puzzle Bobble VR: Vacation Odyssey	2021	No	Meta Quest 2, PlayStation 4, PlayStation 5	Puzzle Bobble 3D: Vacation Odyssey (PS4, PS5)	
Space Invaders: Hidden Heroes (with Onoma)	2021	No	iOS, Android		
Music Diver	December 2022	Yes	—N/a		
Puzzle Bobble Everybubble!	2023	No	Switch		
Groove Coaster Future Performers	2025	No	Switch		
QQQbeats!!!	2025	No	Switch		

=== Licensed games ===
This section lists games which were developed and primarily published by other companies, but licensed to Taito for publication in specific regions (or occasionally specific formats, e.g. cocktail tables).

Title	Date	Arcade	Other platforms	Alternate title(s)	Comments
Ball Park (ボールパーク, Bōru Pāku)	October 1976	Yes	—N/a	Tornado Baseball (NA)	Licensed from Midway; Japanese publisher only
Bombs Away (ボムズ•アウェイ, Bonbusu Auei)	November 1976	Yes	—N/a	Bonn Ugly Away	Licensed from Meadows Games; Japanese publisher only
Clean Sweep (クリーンスイープ, Kurīn Suīpu)	January 1977	Yes	—N/a		Licensed from Ramtek; Japanese publisher only
Barricade (バリケード, Barikēdo)	February 1977	Yes	—N/a		Licensed from Ramtek; Japanese publisher only
Barricade II (バリケードII, Barikēdo II)	March 1977	Yes	—N/a		Licensed from Gremlin; Japanese publisher only
Barricade III (バリケードIII, Barikēdo III)	March 1977	Yes	—N/a		Licensed from Gremlin; Japanese publisher only
Hustle (ハッスル, Hassuru)	July 1977	Yes	—N/a		Licensed from Gremlin Industries; Japanese publisher only
Safari (サファリ)	July 1977	Yes	—N/a		Licensed from Gremlin; Japanese publisher only
Meadows Lane (メドウズレーン, Medouzu Rēn)	September 1977	Yes	—N/a		Licensed from Meadows Games; Japanese publisher only
Robot Bowl (ロボットボウル, Robottu Bouru)	October 1977	Yes	—N/a		Licensed from Exidy; Japanese publisher only
Sub Hunter (サブハンター, Sabu Hantā)	December 1977	Yes	—N/a		Licensed from Gremlin; Japanese publisher only
Acrobat TV (アクロバットTV, Akurobatto TV)	January 1978	Yes	—N/a	Circus	Licensed from Exidy; Japanese publisher only
Space Wars	May 1978	Yes	—N/a		Licensed from Cinematronics; Japanese publisher only
Sea Wolf II (シーウルフII, Shīurufu II)	June 1978	Yes	—N/a		Licensed from Midway; Japanese publisher only
Ball Park II (ボールパークII, Bōru Pāku II)	July 1978	Yes	—N/a	Extra Inning	Licensed from Midway; Japanese publisher only
Trampoline (トランポリン, Toranporin)	July 1978	Yes	—N/a		Licensed from Exidy; Japanese publisher only
Gypsy Juggler (ジプシージャグラー, Jipushī Jagurā)	September 1978	Yes	—N/a		Licensed from Meadows Games; Japanese publisher only
Shuffleboard (シャッフルボード, Shaffurubōdo)	1978	Yes	—N/a		Licensed from Midway; Japanese publisher only
Star Fire	June 1979	Yes	—N/a		Licensed from Exidy; Japanese publisher only
Galaxy Wars (ギャラクシーウォーズ, Gyarakushī Uōzu)	September 1979	Yes	—N/a		Licensed from Universal
Laser Wars (レーザーウォーズ, Rēzā Uōzu)	October 1979	Yes	—N/a		Developed by Cinematronics; Japanese publisher only
Safari Rally (サファリラリー, Safari Rarī)	October 1979	Yes	—N/a		Color version of a game by SNK
Asteroids (T.Tアステロイド, T.T Asuteroido)	March 1980	Yes	—N/a		Licensed from Atari; Japanese publisher only
New York! New York! (ニュー・ヨーク・ニュー・ヨーク)	July 1980	Yes	—N/a		Licensed from Gottlieb, Japanese publisher only
Missile Command (T.Tミサイルコマンド, T.T Misairu Komando)	July 1980	Yes	—N/a		Licensed from Atari, Japanese publisher only
Stratovox	August 1980	Yes	—N/a	Speak & Rescue (スピーク&レスキュー, Supīku & Resukyū)	Developed by Sunsoft; North American publisher only
Space Laser (スペースレーザー, Supēsu Rēzā)	November 1980	Yes	—N/a	Intruder (NA), Space War (JP)	Developed by Konami (Leijac) and published by them in Japan, but published by Taito in Europe
Warp-1 (ワープ-1, Wāpu-1)	1980	Yes	—N/a		Developed by Sunsoft (then known as Sun Electronics) and published by both companies
Western Gun Part II (ウエスタンガンパートII, Uesutan Gan Pāto 2)	1980	Yes	—N/a		Developed by Nintendo and originally released by them as Sheriff
Defender	February 1981	Yes	—N/a		Licensed from Williams; Japanese publisher only
Janputer (ジャンピューター, Janpyūtā)	April 1981	Yes	—N/a	T.T Mahjong	Mahjong game licensed from Sanritsu
Lock 'n' Chase (ロックンチェイス, Rokku n Cheisu)	April 1981	Yes	Apple II, Atari 2600, Game Boy, Intellivision, PlayStation Network, Virtual Console		Published by Taito in the US, and by its developer Data East elsewhere
Zarzon (ザルゾン, Zaruzon)	May 1981	Yes	—N/a	Satan of Saturn (サタン・オブ・サターン, Satan obu Satān)	Developed by SNK; North American publisher only
Dribbling (ドリブリング, Doriburingu)	December 1981	Yes	—N/a		Licensed from Italian developer Model Racing; Japanese publisher only
Moon Shuttle (ムーンシャトル, Mūn Shatoru)	1981	Yes	—N/a		Developed by Nichibutsu; North American publisher only
The Pit (ザピット, Za Pitto)	April 1982	Yes	—N/a		Licensed from Zilec; Japanese publisher only
Lasso (ラッソー)	July 1982	Yes	—N/a		Licensed from SNK for cocktail table release
Mr. Do! (ミスターDo!, Misutā Do!)	September 1982	Yes	ColecoVision		Licensed from Universal Entertainment
Jump Coaster (ジャンプコースター, Janpu Kōsutā)	May 1983	Yes	—N/a		Licensed from Kaneko
Exerion (エクセリオン, Ekuserion)	September 1983	Yes	SG-1000, MSX, NES, Virtual Console		Developed by Kawa Denshi Giken; published by Jaleco in Japan; North American publisher only
10-Yard Fight (10ヤードファイト, 10 Yādo Faito)	1983	Yes	MSX, NES		Developed by Irem; American publisher only
Intrepid (インテレピッド, Interepiddo)	1983	Yes	—N/a		Licensed from Nova Games
Boggy '84 (ボギー'84, Bogī '84)	1983	Yes	—N/a		Licensed from Kaneko
M.A.C.H. 3 (マッハ3)	February 1984	Yes	—N/a		Licensed from Gottlieb
Ring Fighter (リングファイター, Ringu Faitā)	May 1984	Yes	—N/a	Vs Gong Fight	Licensed from Kaneko
Cosmopolis (コスモポリス, Kosumoporisu)	1984 (US)	Yes	—N/a		Licensed from Sunsoft (who published the game in Japan in 1980); US publisher only
Chinese Hero (チャイニーズヒーロー, Chainīzu Hīrō)	October 1984	Yes	—N/a		Developed by Culture Brain; licensed from Taiyo System
Northern Shaolin – Fist of the Flying Dragon (北派少林 飛龍の拳, Hokuha Shōrin Hiryū no Ken)	June 1985	Yes	—N/a	Shanghai Kid	Developed by Culture Brain; licensed from Taiyo System
Wiz (ウィズ, Uizu)	1985	Yes	—N/a		Licensed from Seibu Kaihatsu
Xain'd Sleena (ザインドスリーナ, Zain do Surīna)	November 1986	Yes	Amiga, Amstrad CPC, Atari ST, Commodore 64, MSX, ZX Spectrum	Soldier of Light (EU); Solar Warrior (NA)	Developer and Japanese publisher Technōs Japan licensed this game to Taito for international distribution
Double Dragon (ダブルドラゴン, Daburu Doragon)	June 1987	Yes	Amiga, Amstrad CPC, Apple OS, Atari 2600, Atari 7800, Atari Lynx, Atari ST, Commodore 64, Game Boy, Game Boy Advance, IBM PC, iOS, Mobile phone, NES, Master System, Sega Mega Drive, ZX Spectrum, Zeebo		Licensed from Technōs Japan; published by Taito outside Japan
Cross Shooter (クロスシューター, Kurosu Shūtā)	August 1987	Yes	—N/a	Air Raid	Licensed from Seibu Kaihatsu
China Gate	1988	Yes	—N/a	Sai Yu Gou Ma Roku (西遊降魔録, Sai Yū Gō Ma Roku)	Licensed from Technōs Japan
Arbalester	1989	Yes	—N/a		Developed by Jorudan; originally published by SETA Corporation. Licensed to Taito America for US release
Fire Mustang	1991	Yes	Sega Mega Drive		Mega Drive version publisher only; originally developed by NMK and licensed from UPL
Rezon	September 1991	Yes	—N/a		Licensed from Allumer
Blandia	October 1992	Yes	—N/a		Licensed from Allumer
FixEight	1992	Yes	—N/a		Licensed from Toaplan
Armorines: Project S.W.A.R.M.	2000	No	PlayStation		Licensed from Acclaim Entertainment; Japanese publisher only
Re-Volt: It's RC Revolution	2000	No	Dreamcast		Licensed from Acclaim Entertainment; Japanese publisher only
Spirit of Speed 1937 (スピリット オブ スピード)	2001	No	Dreamcast		Licensed from Acclaim Entertainment; Japanese publisher only
Shikigami no Shiro (式神の城)	2001	Yes	PC, PlayStation 2, Xbox	Mobile Light Force 2 (NA/EU PS2 release); Castle of Shikigami (2017 PC release)	Japanese PS2 publisher only
Mushihime-sama (虫姫さま)	2004	Yes	iOS, PlayStation 2, Xbox 360	Insect Princess	Developed by Cave; PS2 publisher only
Psikyo Shooting Collection Vol. 1: Strikers 1945 I & II	2004	No	PlayStation 2		
Psikyo Shooting Collection Vol. 2: Samurai Aces & Sengoku Blade	2004	No	PlayStation 2		
Psikyo Shooting Collection Vol. 3: Sol Divide & Dragon Blaze	2004	No	PlayStation 2		
Target: Terror	2004	Yes	—N/a	Target: Force (JP)	Licensed from Raw Thrills; Japanese publisher only
The Fast and the Furious	2005	Yes	—N/a		Licensed from Raw Thrills; Japanese publisher only
Raiden III (雷電III)	2005	No	EZweb, iOS, Mobile phone, PC, PlayStation 2, PlayStation Network		Licensed from MOSS; Japanese PS2 publisher only

=== Taito of Brazil ===
Taito of Brazil published several clones of existing games on Moon Cresta's hardware. Original games are listed in parentheses.

- Sandwich/X-salada (BurgerTime)
- Zig Zag (Dig Dug)
- Kong (adapted from Crazy Kong, another Donkey Kong clone)
- Big Flyer (Fly Boy)
- Jump (Frogger)
- Fantastic (Galaga)
- Batalha Galactica (Galaxian)
- Super Fantastic (Gaplus)
- Star Crest (Moon Cresta)
- Stock Car (New Rally-X)
- Condor (Phoenix)
- Piranha (Phunky Fish)
- Polaris II (Polaris)
- Commander (Scramble)
- Fighting (Super Cobra)
- Time Fighter (Time Pilot)
- Olympics (Track & Field)
- Caçapa (Video Hustler)
- Columbia (Xevious)

== Motion simulators ==
Non-interactive arcade attractions that simulate amusement park rides.

- D3BOS
- IDYA
- IDYA II
- Super D3BOS

== See also ==
- Taito
- Square Enix
- List of Square Enix video games
- List of Square Enix mobile games
