= List of arcade video games: U =

This is a list of arcade video games organized alphabetically by name. It does not include PC or console games unless they were also released in video arcades. See Lists of video games for related lists.

Title	Alternate Title(s)	Year	Manufacturer	Genre(s)	Max. Players	PCB Model
U.N. Defense Force - Earth Joker	—	1993	Visco			
U.N. Squadron	Area 88 ^{JP}	1989	Capcom	Scrolling shooter	2	CPS1
U.S. Classic	—	1989	SETA, Taito	Sports	1	
Uchan Nanchan no Hono'o no Challenger: Ultra Denryu Iraira Bou	—	1997	SNK		2	NeoGeo
Uchuu Daisakusen: Chocovader Contactee	—	2002	Namco			
Ufo Senshi Yohko Chan	—	1988	Sega	Action, Maze / Platformer	2	
Ultimate Arctic Thunder	—	2001	Midway			
Ultimate First Mission	—	2009	Universal Space	Rail shooter	2	
Ultimate Mortal Kombat 3	—	1995	Midway	Fighting	2	
Ultimate Tennis	—	1993	Nova Worldwide	Sports		
Ultra Balloon	—	1996	SunA	Platformer	2	
Ultra Keibitai	Ultra X Weapon	1995	Banpresto			
Ultra Keibitai: Kuusou Tokusatsu Game	Ultraman	1991	Banpresto			
Ultra Maru-hi Mahjong	—	1993	Apple			
Ultra Quiz	—	1983	Taito	Quiz		
Ultra Tank	—	1978	Atari	Shooter	2	
Ultra Toukon Densetsu	—	1993	Banpresto			
Ultraman Club: Tatakae! Ultraman Kyoudai!!	—	1992	Banpresto			
UltraPin	—	2006	Global VR			
Um Jammer Lammy	—	1999	Namco		2	
Uncle Poo	—	1983	Diatec			
Under Defeat	—	2005	G.Rev			
Under Fire	—	1993	Taito	Shooting gallery	2	
Undercover Cops	—	1992	Irem	Beat 'em up	2	
Undercover Cops: Alpha Renewal Version	—	1992	Irem	Beat 'em up	2	
The Undoukai	—	1984	Taito	Sports	4	
UniwarS	Ginga Teikoku no Gyakushuu^{JP}	1980	Irem	Fixed shooter	2	
Untouchable	—	1987	Dynax	Poker	1	
The Untouchable	—	1997	PlayPak	Fighting		
Up'n Down	—	1983	Sega	Racing	2	
Up Scope	—	1986	Grand Productions	Shooting gallery	1	
Urachacha Mudaeri	Euratchacha Mu Daeri	2002	GameTou			
Us Vs. Them	—	1984	Mylstar	Rail shooter	1	
USAAF Mustang	Fire Mustang	1990	UPL	Scrolling shooter	2	
Usagi	—	2001	Warashi			Taito G-Net
Usagi Online	—	2005	Warashi			
Usagi Yasei no Topai: Yamashiro Mahjong Compilation	—	2003	Warashi			NAOMI GD-ROM
