= Caplet =

Caplet may refer to:

- Interest rate caps, usually forming part of a series of caps and/or floors within a derivative contract
- Caplet, a smooth, coated, oval-shaped medicinal tablet in the shape of a capsule
- André Caplet (1878–1925), French composer and conductor, early 20th century
- VG Pocket Caplet, a portable videogame system created by Performance Designed Products and Pelican Products
