= Jet Falcon =

Jet Falcon may refer to:

- the "Zoid" from Zoids, see List of Zoids
- the jet aircraft both known as the Falcon
  - Dassault Falcon
  - F-16 Fighting Falcon
