= Supermouse =

Supermouse may refer to:

- Supermouse, a mouse with superpowers who appears in comic books published by Standard Comics
- Super Mouse was also the original name of Mighty Mouse
- Metabolic supermice, bio-genetically modified mice
- Super Mouse, an arcade game created by Taito in 1982
