= Under Fire =

Under Fire may refer to:

== Books ==
- Under Fire (Barbusse novel) (French: Le Feu), a novel by Henri Barbusse
- Under Fire (Blackwood novel), by Grant Blackwood in Tom Clancy's Jack Ryan Jr. franchise series
- Under Fire: An American Story, a 1991 non-fiction book by Oliver North and William Novak

== Film and TV ==
- Under Fire (1926 film), an American silent western film
- Under Fire (1957 film), a film starring Rex Reason
- Under Fire (1983 film), a film starring Nick Nolte
- Under Fire (2025 film), an American action comedy film
- "Under Fire" (Casualty), a webisode of the British medical drama Casualty
- "Under Fire" (Dad's Army), an episode of the British sitcom Dad's Army
- Under Fire (TV series), a 2003 documentary TV series, written and presented by Dan Cruickshank

== Games ==
- Under Fire!, a 1985 computer wargame
- Under Fire (video game), a 1993 arcade game

== Music ==
- "Under Fire", a song by Axium from The Story Thus Far
- "Under Fire", a 2018 song by Spice from the mixtape Captured
- Under Fire (album), an album by Gato Barbieri
- "Under Fire", a single by Roy Wood from the album Starting Up
