= List of arcade video games: Z =

This is a list of arcade video games organized alphabetically by name. It does not include PC or console games unless they were also released in video arcades. See Lists of video games for related lists.

Title	Alternate Title(s)	Year	Manufacturer	Genre(s)	Max. Players	PCB Model
Zarya Vostoka	—	1984	Nova Games		2	
Zarzon	Satan of Saturn	1981	SNK	Fixed shooter	2	
Zaviga	—	1984	Data East	Scrolling shooter	2	
Zaxxon	—	1982	Sega	Isometric shooter	2	
Zed Blade	Operation Ragnarok	1994	SNK	Scrolling shooter	2	
Zektor	—	1982	Sega	Multidirectional shooter	2	
Zen Nippon Pro-Wrestling Featuring Virtua	—	1997	Sega			Sega ST-V
Zenkoku Seifuku Bishoujo Grand Prix: Find Love	—	1997	Sega			Sega ST-V
Zero Gunner	—	1997	Psikyo	Scrolling shooter	2	
Zero Gunner 2	—	2001	Psikyo	Scrolling shooter	2	
Zero Hour	—	1980	Universal	Scrolling shooter	2	
Zero Point	—	1998	Unico Electronics	Shooting gallery	2	
Zero Point 2	—	1999	Unico Electronics	Shooting gallery	2	
Zero Target	Gekitsui Oh	1985	Data East		2	
Zero Team	Zero Team USA	1993	Seibu Kaihatsu	Beat 'em up	2	
Zero Team 2000	—	2000	Seibu Kaihatsu	Beat 'em up	2	
Zero Wing	—	1989	Toaplan	Scrolling shooter	2	
Zero Zone	—	1993	Comad	Puzzle, Erotic	2	
Zeroize	—	1983	Data East		2	
Zhong Guo Chu Da D	—	2000	IGS			
Zing Zing Zip	—	1992	Tecmo	Scrolling shooter	2	
Zoar	—	1982	Tago Electronics	Scrolling shooter	2	
Zodiack	—	1983	Orca	Scrolling shooter	2	
Zoids Infinity	—	2004	Taito	Rail shooter	2	
Zoids Infinity EX PLUS	—	2006	Taito	Rail shooter	2	
Zoku Mahjong Housoukyoku	—	199?	Nichibutsu			
Zoku Otenami Haiken	—	2000	Success			Taito G-Net
Zombie Raid	—	1995	American Sammy	Shooting gallery	2	
Zombie Revenge	—	1999	Sega	Beat 'em up	2	
Zoo Keeper	—	1982	Taito	Platformer	2	
Zooty Drum	—	2000	PARA Enterprises			
Zooo	—	2004	Success			Taito G-Net
Zun Zun Block	—	1979	Taito			
Zunzunkyou No Yabou	—	1994	Sega			
Zupapa	—	2001	SNK	Platformer	2	NeoGeo
Zwackery	—	1984	Bally Midway		2	
Zzyzzyxx	—	1982	Cinematronics	Maze	2	
