= Magical Date =

1996 video game

- Arcade flyer
- Developer: Taito
- Publisher: Taito
- Platforms: Arcade, PlayStation
- Release: Arcade: JP: December 1996; PlayStation: JP: November 20, 1997
- Genre: Minigame compilation
- Modes: Single-player, two players
- Arcade system: Taito FX-1A

Magical Date (Note: Japanese: まじかるで〜と, Hepburn: Majikaru Dēto) is a video game published by Taito in 1996 for arcade. The game is a romance-themed minigame compilation. The goal of the game is to becomes closer to a girl you take out on a date. To do so, the player must successfully beat several minigames. At the end of the game, the player confesses their love to girl at a Christmas party.

The game was later ported to the PlayStation on November 20, 1997. This port received generally positive reviews from Dengeki PlayStation and Famitsu who complimented the mini-games as being addictive while finding that audiences may be split on the appeal of the three potential girls to date.

== Gameplay ==
Magical Date is a romance-themed minigame compilation. After the player enters the name, he chooses one of the three available girls and begins a date. The player can ask about their dating preferences and then choose options such as heading to the beach for a festival for the summer. Along the way to their date, the player encounters various mini-games. There are 17 mini-games in total. If the player fails to complete the objective for a mini-game, their lives decrease. Running out of lives leads to a game over.

Successfully completing mini-games raises the intimacy ranking with the girl selected. At the end of the minigames, the player confesses their love to the girl at a Christmas party.

== Release and reception ==
PlayStation Reception

Review scores
Publication	Score
Dengeki PlayStation	90/100, 70/100
Famitsu	9/10, 6/10, 8/10, 7/10
Weekly TV Gamer	6/10, 6/10, 6/10

Magical Date was released into Japanese arcades in December 1996. Game Machine listed Magical Date on their February 1, 1997 issue as being the fourth most-successful arcade game of the month. The game was released for the PlayStation on November 20, 1997.

The PlayStation port was reviewed by four editors in Famitsu. Two reviewers compared it to Sega's Tant-R series, with one reviewer saying it was full of simple but meticiously crafted minigames and did not suffer from the sloppiness or tediousness found in this style of game. While one reviewer in Dengeki PlayStation said they mini-games were addicting, another said they wished there more available.Reviews in both Famitsu and Dengeki PlayStation said the loading times might be too long for some players.

One reviewer in Dengeki PlayStation said the opinions would be divided on whether the polygonal girls were cute or not. Commenting on the girls, one Famitsu reviewer said they were unrealistic and almost doll-like but became endearing. Another reviewer said that they lacked detail and wished they had more sex appeal.

== See also ==
- 1996 in video games
- List of Taito games
