= Adventure Canoe =

1982 video game

- Developer: Taito
- Publisher: Taito
- Platform: Arcade
- Release: 1982
- Genre: Action
- Modes: Single-player, multiplayer

Adventure Canoe (Note: Japanese: アドベンチャーカヌー, Hepburn: Adobenchā Kanū) is a 1982 action video game developed and published by Taito for arcades. It was released in extremely limited quantities outside Japan in 1982; only one machine was reported to exist in a Taito-affiliated arcade, to the point people believed it to be a hoax or mislabled bootleg. Taito confirmed its existence by quietly releasing the game and Outer Zone, also previously believed to be non-existent, into their Egret II Mini arcade cabinet.

Hamster Corporation released the game as part of their Arcade Archives series for the Nintendo Switch and PlayStation 4, as well as their Arcade Archives 2 series for the Nintendo Switch 2, PlayStation 5 and Xbox Series X/S in February 2026.

== Gameplay ==
The player rows across rapids on a canoe. The player must avoid obstacles such as rocks, whirlpools and small islands, which kill the player on hit. Passing animals, which are hostile to the player, can be shot to gain extra points. Extra points can be gained if the player navigates to specific spots on the map. Each level ends when a boss character appears and must be defeated. The game ends when the player loses all three lives.
