= Super Mouse =

1982 video game

- Title screen
- Developer: Taito
- Publisher: Taito
- Platform: Arcade
- Release: NA: 1982
- Genre: Platform
- Modes: Single-player, multiplayer

Super Mouse is an arcade video game released by Taito in 1982. It uses the same hardware as Taito's earlier arcade game Round-Up.

== Gameplay ==
The player controls a mouse collecting a stash of food that is scattered around the house. Opposing the mouse are cats and cobras, which pop up out of nowhere. As defense, he has bombs which can be laid and detonated, rocks on top of the house to drop, and trap-doors. In between levels, the game has a bonus round in the form of a virtual slot machine, in which the player needs to get identical picture patterns to get as many points as possible, ranging from 200 to 1500 points.
