= Monkey Puncher =

2000 video game

- European box art
- Developer: Atelier Double
- Publishers: EU: Event Horizon Software; JP: Taito
- Directors: Kouki Takahashi; Nobuaki Kuroki
- Producer: Takeshi Kamimura
- Designers: Kengo Miyata; Daisuke Ishiwata; Mizuko Mogami
- Programmers: Masashi Yoshida; Hiroshi Kanda
- Artists: Kimiyoshi Yokonuma; Aoi Momonoya
- Composer: Izumi Shimizu
- Platform: Game Boy Color
- Release: EU: December 2000; JP: March 24, 2000
- Genre: Strategy
- Mode: Single-player multiplayer

Monkey Puncher (さるパンチャー, Saru Panchā) is a video game for the Game Boy Color, developed by Atelier Double, and released in December 2000. The game's goal is to train a monkey to fight in organised boxing matches in order to save the main character's father and sibling.

== Gameplay ==
At the start of the game, the player must choose to play as either Kenta (male) or Sumire (female). While the choice has little effect on gameplay, the sibling who is not chosen is the one kidnapped. Shortly after the beginning of the game, the player is given their first monkey, called Freddy, to train.

After obtaining the first monkey, and any subsequent new monkey, the player must befriend it by offering it food before they can begin training it. Over time, the monkey becomes more and more friendly towards the main character.

The monkeys are trained in skipping, using a punchbag, doing sit-ups, running and going shopping. These activities increase, respectively, the monkey's speed, power, strength, stamina and knowledge. In addition, a fifth option, sparring, has the potential to increase all statistics, albeit by a smaller amount.

In skipping, punching, sit-ups, and running, the monkeys learn to train by copying the actions of the main character whose motions are controlled by a rhythmic pressing of the "A" button. Over time, a monkey will learn to imitate these actions for a longer period eventually requiring no prompting for it to begin. The player can then choose to send the monkey out to shop for certain items or let it simply buy what it wants—this is the only way to obtain new items. As its knowledge increases, the monkey will be able to follow a shopping list with greater accuracy and bring home rarer items. Sparring involves a normal match between the player's monkey and a computer-controlled opponent, although without a clear winner or any reward beyond stat increases. All the monkey's stats have a maximum limit. It is possible to date your monkeys either with each other or with a monkey from a friend or a dating shop within the game. After dating, the first monkey vanishes and is replaced with a new baby monkey. The maximum stats for this new monkey may be higher or lower than the player's original monkey, depending on the monkey it is paired with. A monkey with all the stats maxed out will produce a baby monkey with much higher maximum stats.

Each activity within the game takes half a day, regardless of what is achieved, and every three days the player's monkey must enter an organised Monkey Boxing League fight. Newly acquired monkeys are allowed five days before their first test match to enter the league. If a test match is failed, the monkey can try again after another five days. When the opportunity for a match arises, the player can choose from three monkeys to fight against, at least one of which will be at a better rank than the player's monkey. The stronger an opponent's monkey, the more money the player earns by defeating it. If the defeated monkey is at a better rank than the players monkey, the player's monkey gains a rank. Conversely, if the player loses a match against a lower ranked monkey, the player's monkey drops a rank.

The player has no direct control over their monkey during a match, but in between rounds they can choose to refill its health, its stamina, or a little of both, and they can advise it on what strategy to use. Monkeys that have not befriended the player enough may not listen to the player's advice. Boxing matches are won by either a count or a KO. In the event of neither monkey KO'ing the other, the match is judged by the amount of health each monkey has.

== Story ==
At the beginning of the game, it is revealed that the main character's mother has died and that the player's father is a Monkey Boxing trainer who is kidnapped along with the main character's brother/sister (depending on who the player chooses to be) by the Saru gang of monkey gangsters. It is up to the player to advance through the Monkey Boxing Leagues to confront Saru and rescue the player's father and sibling. It is later revealed that they are being brainwashed into training and fighting monkeys for Saru. At first, Saru sends Cain after the player, who challenges the player to a Monkey Boxing Match. After accepting the match, and defeating Cain's Monkey, Cain returns to the Mysterious Master of Saru. The next 'Boss' Character the player must face is the ROBO monkey, developed by Saru's Professor. Once these two have been defeated, and the player ascends to title of JSB Champion, they will receive an invitation to the Monkey 1 Grand Prix, held on Saru's secret island base. Upon defeating the 5 opponents, including rematches with Cain, and the professor, and battles with Sumire/Kenta, the player's father, and the Saru master, the game is essentially completed.

== Reception ==
N64 Magazine gave the game a rating of 4 out of 5 stars, while the French video game website Gamekult gave it a rating of 5 out of 10.
