= Zoids Infinity =

- Arcade flyer
- Developer: Taito
- Publisher: Taito
- Series: Zoids
- Platform: Arcade
- Release: 2004
- Genre: Rail shooter
- Mode: Up to 2 players simultaneously
- Arcade system: Namco System 246

Zoids Infinity is a series of sci-fi shooter arcade games that can be used in conjunction with special swipe cards to unlock new features. Originally debuting in 2004 as a System 246 coin-operated arcade game from Taito in Japan.

A dedicated RFID card can be used which has a personal authentication of the players with the IC chip. The user can save each data such as weapon parts, points and items of zoids which has registered as player's ZOIDS.

The vendor cabinet is next to the side-by-side arcade cabinet urging the vendor to sell cards and customize the data by each dedicated vendor. Side-by-side sit-down cockpit design arcade game with two joysticks per player to use.

== Gameplay ==
Zoids Infinity is a battle action game using Zoids, which are dinosaur/animal/insect robots developed by Tomy Co., Ltd. Players can choose favorite Zoids based on design, speed and mobility. You can customize your own ZOIDS by using weapons parts and items which you have got. The game allows you to take control of Zoids machines in battle while you collect parts by defeating Zoids. The arcade originally featured 29 Zoids to control. In 2-player mode, the screen is split horizontally where each player views the action from a personal vantage point.

== History ==
Zoids Infinity was an exception regarding the music for the game. Time was a factor in the composing and production of music for the game as most Taito arcade games use one composer to write all the music for a game. Hisayoshi Ogura took the role of sound producer, and chose two other composers to complete the Zoids Infinity soundtrack with. The series of Zoids game were released on arcade, consoles and handheld systems. The complete List of Zoids games are available from more than 10 different ports.

== Characters ==
=== Arcade version ===
==== Canon カノン ====
Ancient Zoids girls. Zoids and sent her a heart, with an uncanny ability to heal the wounds of the Zoids.

=== PS2 Version ===
A ports to the console titled Zoids Infinity Fuzors, was released only in Japan. Developed and published by Takara Tomy.

==== Reims ランス ====
Hero of the story mode of the original game.
