= Birdie King =

1982 video game

- Arcade flyer
- Developer(s): Taito
- Publisher(s): Taito
- Platform(s): Arcade
- Release: 1982
- Genre(s): Sports
- Mode(s): Single-player, multiplayer

Birdie King (バーデイー・キング) is a golf arcade video game released in 1982 by Taito. It was followed by two sequels: Birdie King 2 in 1983, and Birdie King 3 in 1984.

Screenshot

== Reception ==
In Japan, Game Machine listed Birdie King 2 on their June 1, 1983 issue as being the fourth most-successful table arcade unit of the month.
