= Battle Gear =

Video game series

- The Battle Gear logo, used in the third and fourth games
- Genres: Racing; Sim racing
- Developer: Taito
- Publisher: Taito
- Platforms: Arcade, PlayStation, PlayStation 2
- First release: Side by Side; 1996
- Latest release: Battle Gear 4 Tuned; 2006

Battle Gear (バトル・ギア), previously known as Side by Side (サイド・バイ・サイド), is a series of racing video games developed and published by Taito, first released in arcades with Side by Side in 1996. The series was later released for various home consoles, such as the PlayStation and PlayStation 2.

== History ==
The Side by Side games allows the player to select import sports cars from major Japanese automakers, namely Toyota, Nissan, Honda, and Mazda, with Mitsubishi and Subaru added in Side by Side 2. Tracks generally resemble Japanese mountain passes, known as touge. The first Side by Side (1996) proved to be a hit in Japan.

While the first two Battle Gear games retain the same gameplay as Side by Side games, starting from Battle Gear 3, online features such as online leaderboards (previously present in the Japanese PlayStation 2 version of Battle Gear 2) and vehicle customization are included through the NESYS network in both arcade and home versions; in the arcade versions, devices resembling an actual car key is used instead of save cards used by competitor titles such as Initial D Arcade Stage and Wangan Midnight Maximum Tune, in which the player turns the ignition key after inserting a coin to play with their saved data. Battle Gear 4 saw the inclusion of European and American makers for the first and only time, namely Renault, Peugeot, Citroën, Mini, Volkswagen and Ford, with additional Japanese manufacturer Suzuki also included in Battle Gear 4 Tuned. All NESYS servers for the games have since been shut down, the latest being that of Battle Gear 4 Tuned on March 31, 2019.

The PlayStation 2 version of Battle Gear 2 was licensed by Midas Interactive and released as a budget game named Tokyo Road Race by various distributors in PAL territories. Online leaderboards, accessed using a dial-up modem in the Japanese release, were removed in the Tokyo Road Race version. North American arcade versions of Side by Side 2 and the first Battle Gear also had Honda cars removed due to licensing issues with American Honda Motor Company, but they are featured in the North American version of Battle Gear 3.

Between Side by Side 2 to Battle Gear 3, the series features cars resembling those used by Initial D characters, usually as secret cars. In Battle Gear 4 Tuned, these (previously removed in the original Battle Gear 4) were replaced by a pair of real-life D1 Grand Prix cars. Certain Battle Gear 4 Tuned cabinets, branded with Professional suffix, feature a six-speed gear shifter and a clutch pedal for immersive simulation-style gameplay, similar to those present in F355 Challenge.

== Series timeline ==
- Side by Side (Taito JC System Type-C)

Released in August 1996 in Japan.

- Side by Side 2 Evoluzione (Taito JC System Type-C)

Released in June 1997 in Japan. International versions were released without the Evoluzione subtitle. An update called Side by Side 2 Evoluzione RR was later released that year.

- Side by Side Special (PlayStation)

Released in December 1997 in Japan; features content from both Side by Side games. Re-released in November 1999 as Side by Side Special 2000, which adds DualShock vibration support.

- Battle Gear (Taito Type-Zero)

Released in June 1999 in Japan. Distributed in North America (with Honda cars disabled) by Innovative Concepts in Entertainment.

- Battle Gear 2 (Taito Type-Zero, PlayStation 2)

Released in July 2000 in Japanese arcades. The PlayStation 2 port, which features online leaderboards and adds the Toyota MR2 (SW20) as a playable car, was released in March 2001 in Japan and November 2002 in Europe under the title of Tokyo Road Race with online leaderboards support removed. An update of the arcade version named Battle Gear 2V was released in 2001 for export markets.

- Battle Gear 3 (Namco System 246, PlayStation 2)

Released in Japanese arcades in November 2002, with the PlayStation 2 port (featuring some tracks and cars from Battle Gear 3 Tuned) in December 2003. The arcade version was distributed in North America by Betson Enterprises in 2004, with Honda cars present. The NESYS online service for both arcade and PlayStation 2 versions were closed on December 26, 2005.

- Battle Gear 3 Tuned (Namco System 246)

Released in Japanese arcades in December 2003, as an update to the original Battle Gear 3. The NESYS online service for Battle Gear 3 Tuned closed on March 31, 2006.

- Battle Gear 4 (Taito Type X+)

Released in July 2005 in Japan.

- Battle Gear 4 Tuned (Taito Type X+)

Released in November 2006 in Japan as an update for Battle Gear 4; later re-released for export markets in 2010 without support for the NESYS service, but with additional tracks (previously NESYS exclusive content in the original release) enabled. The NESYS online service closed on March 31, 2019.

- Top Speed (Taito Type X2)

Announced in 2009, named after Taito's earlier arcade racing game Top Speed, and entered location testing the same year, the game was to be the successor to the Battle Gear series with online multiplayer across different arcade centers. The game was quietly canceled after the location testing concluded.

== Reception ==
The Side by Side and Battle Gear games have been featured on monthly Japanese arcade rankings published by Game Machine, with the first Side by Side listed as the second most-successful dedicated arcade game of the month in the September 1, 1996 issue, Side by Side 2 Evoluzione in the fifth place in the September 1, 1997 issue, the first Battle Gear ranking third in the August 1, 1999 issue, and Battle Gear 2 in the second place in the September 1, 2000 issue.
