= Double Axle =

1991 video game

- North American arcade flyer
- Developer: Taito
- Publisher: Taito
- Platform: Arcade
- Release: JP: September 1991; NA: October 1991
- Genre: Racing
- Modes: Single-player, multiplayer
- Arcade system: Taito Z System

Double Axle, known as Power Heels in Japan, is a monster truck racing video game released in arcades by Taito in 1991. The object of the game is to complete every single race by coming in 3rd Place or better. If the player fails to do so, the game will end. By completing races successfully, the player will be awarded prize money depending on how well they did. This game also features the option of upgrading the monster truck, which is essential for completing harder races. Additional money can be earned by completing the bonus stages after each race. The original Japanese version Power Wheels has slightly different gameplay.

== Upgrades for the truck ==
Only seen in the North American version, Double Axle offered players the option to upgrade their monster truck before every race. When starting the game, the player is given a small amount of money to buy their first upgrade. However, in order to obtain more upgrades for the player's monster truck, the player must first win races for extra money. These upgrades include a bigger engine, bigger tires, and several nitro boosters. To help the player further, adding credits to the game will give the player more money to purchase these upgrades.

== Sprint Race, "Main Events" ==
Screenshot of Double Axle

At the start of the game, the player is given a choice of three different races, plus a Car Crushing Contest.

The first race, being the easiest, is the Cross-Country Race. In this race, the player must navigate their way through a river, as well as a dense forest, and avoid falling off the side of a mountain. Most of these hazards can easily be avoided. In the North American release, the player will have to maneuver through a raging volcano eruption, dodging several falling rocks in the process.

The second race, which is moderately harder, is the Mud-Bog Race. The race begins with the player driving through a maze of giant rocks. If the player hits a giant rock, this will cause the truck to stop, which will mean the player will have to immediately put the truck in reverse and pull back. Afterwards, the player must navigate through mud bogs. Afterwards, the player will come across a diverge at the halfway point of the race, similar to the route changes in Sega's Out Run. If the player takes the left route, they must make leaps of faith across canyons. If they take the right path, they must drive through a series of tornadoes. Finally, they must drive through another maze of rocks before they reach the finish.

The third race, which is the hardest of all three races, is the Icy Road Race. The race begins with the player driving through snow and ice, while occasionally dodging large blocks of ice scattered on the road. The player will eventually race through an icy cavern, dodging several stalagmites inside. Afterwards, the player must also carefully navigate their way across a steep mountaintop while fighting a fierce blizzard, which can cause the monster truck to slip off either side of the path.

In every single race, despite the many obstacles and hazards, the player must also watch out for the rival drivers. If the player collides with any of the drivers, the truck will slow down, and sometimes cause the player to lose control. However, the player can also knock other drivers off the road by bumping them from behind, which is helpful in winning the race.

== Car Crushing Contest, Demolition Derby ==
Once all three races have been completed, the Demolition Derby becomes available. This serves as the game's final event, where the player will have exactly two minutes to take out nine rival drivers in a single run. During this event, the player will have to navigate through mud bogs, several signs and barriers, and rows of crushed cars. This will aid the player in taking out the other drivers, but can also slow the player down if they go off course. If the player fails to take out the nine drivers before the two minutes is up, the game is over, however, the player is allowed to continue until they are successful.

Additionally, after the player successfully finishes one of the three races prior to the Demolition Derby, the car crushing contest would follow. The events take place at a stadium, a busy highway, and a beachside course. Much like the earlier version of the game, the player must score higher than the rival driver. If the player fails to score higher than the rival, the game is over, however, they'll have an opportunity to continue afterwards, unlike the earlier version.

== Japanese version, Earlier release ==
In Japan, Double Axle was known as "Power Wheels" and the name for export release was ostensibly changed due to Kransco and their line of Power Wheels motorized toys for children. In this version, all the races ran on a 90-second countdown similar to most racing games at the time, and 60 seconds for the Car Crushing Contest. The objective in Power Wheels is to complete three laps around the selected course before time runs out. After every lap, extra time will be added to the clock. The game also pits you against a rival driver who will taunt you before the race begins, and vice versa if you pass him during the race. Power Wheels also gives the player three nitro boosters before every race, excluding the Car Crushing Contest, in which the player only gets one.

The North American version of Double Axle also featured a very different attract from Power Wheels, and gives you the right to continue, whereas Power Wheels automatically proclaims Game Over after a race. In the North American version, if the players lose a race, they will be taken to a continue screen afterward. To add a little pressure to the player, the countdown would slowly zoom in with the numbers eventually taking up the entire screen until the zero completely envelops the screen, followed by the traditional "Game Over" screen from the original game.

== Development ==
Double Axle was exhibited at the 1991 Amusement & Music Operators Association (AMOA) expo.
