= List of Zoids video games =

This is a list of computer and video games based on the Zoids franchise.

== Zoids Console Games ==
=== Zoids: The Battle Begins (C64, Amstrad & Spectrum) ===
In 1986, Martech released a home computer game, Zoids: The Battle Begins, for the C64, ZX Spectrum and Amstrad CPC, based on the Original European Zoids Release. The plot revolved around the rebuilding of Zoidzilla: players would assume control of a Spiderzoid and hunt for the lost parts of Zoidzilla in order to repair him and defeat the Red Zoid forces.

=== Zoids: Battle of the Central Continent (NES) ===
Zoids: Chuuou Tairiku no Tatakai was released on 5 September 1987 for the Famicom.

=== Zoids 2: Zenbase Strikes Back (NES) ===
Zoids 2: Zenebasu no Gyakushuu was released on 17 January 1989 for the Famicom.

=== Zoids: Apocalypse (NES) ===
Zoids: Mokushiroku (Lit: Apocalypse) was released on 21 December 1990. It is a strategy game wherein a player controls units, however, when two units engage each other in battle, the game shifts into an action-oriented format. The game is set at the end of the OJR Battle Story. One of the unique features of the game is the ability to choose whether it plays like a turn-based strategy game, or a real time strategy game. There are also earthquakes that occur during gameplay that would alter the terrain, sometimes opening up new routes or revealing previously inaccessible upgrades. This game was only released in Japan. It was later re-released in 2009, as one of the games available on the Wii's Virtual Console.

=== Zoids Vs. (GameCube) ===
- Zoids Vs.
- Zoids Vs. II (Zoids: Battle Legends in the United States)
- Zoids Vs. III

This game lets players customize their Own personal Zoids, then jump into battle against the computer AI or an opposing player. The game features characters taken from the series as well as introduces a few new ones. The main mode is the mission mode, where players pick their sides (Empire or Republic), then take on multiple enemies on the battlefield. There is also a Zoid Battle Mode, where the player can face off against Zoids of his/her choice, complete with intros and special attacks straight from the series. Up to two players can go head-to-head in versus mode.

Zoids Vs. III looks and plays similarly to its predecessors, offering fast-paced robot action in wide-open battlefields. New to the series is the ability to perform sliding turns in battle and take to the sky outright and battle opponents in the air. Another upgrade is the ability to engage in four-player split-screen battles (as opposed to the predecessors' two-player versus modes), in configurations from 1 vs 3, 2 on 2 matches, and battle royale free-for-alls, with human players or CPU bots. Modes include story mode, battle mode, VS mode, fist mode, and a Zoids Museum mode.

=== Zoids 2 (PS1) ===
Zoids 2: Helic Republic VS Guylos Empire (Japanese) is a PlayStation simulation game set in the Zoids universe. The game pits the Helic Republic against the Guylos Empire, using the popular Zoids toys/anime characters to battle out the conflict. Players move the more than 100 different Zoid units to try to beat the computer-controlled enemy forces. There is also a two-player versus mode where players pit their Zoids against each other.

=== Zoids Battle Card Game (PS1) ===
Zoids Battle Card Game it's a tactic RPG developed by Natsume Co., Ltd. and Act Japan for the PlayStation system. The gameplay is like a table board game, the player can combine the units with a card deck that includes weapons, situations, equipment, ammo, pilots, etc.

=== Zoids Struggle (PS2) ===
Zoids Struggle was the first Zoids game to be released on the PlayStation 2. The game included a story mode which loosely followed the television series. Zoids in this game were also customizable allowing the player to upgrade parts by earning points in other areas of the game.

=== Zoids: Full Metal Crash (GameCube) ===
Zoids: Full Metal Crash used the same engine and underlying gameplay as Zoids Struggle, but featured a new branching story mode, a greater array of pilots (including several from the Zoids Genesis anime), and many more playable zoids. Zoids FMC features many more unlockable features than Zoids Struggle, including secondary (and tertiary) pilots, and a large number of initially locked zoids.

=== Zoids Infinity (PS2) ===
Zoids Infinity was released in Japan on the PlayStation 2 in 2005 as a port of the original arcade game.

=== Zoids Tactics (PS2) ===
Also released in 2005, Zoids Tactics is a tactical RPG in which the player builds armies of Zoids to battle computer enemies.

=== Zoids Infinity EX Neo (Xbox 360) ===
Another port of the arcade game for the Xbox 360, released in 2006 (in Japan). In this expanded version of the game, players could play against each other online through Xbox Live.

=== Zoids Assault (Xbox 360) ===
Zoids Assault was released in September 2008, developed by Atlus. It uses a turn-based combat system. This game allows the user to customise their zoids and pilots with many upgrades.

=== Zoids Wild: Blast Unleashed (Switch) ===
Zoids Wild: Blast Unleashed was the first Zoids game to be released on the Nintendo Switch in 2020. The game is based on the anime Zoids Wild; Different game modes include 2-player battles, Mission Mode, Battle Tactics Mode, and Practice Mode.

== Zoids Portable Games ==
=== Zoids Densetsu (Zoids Legend) (Game Boy) ===
Densetsu is a Game Boy game, released in Japan(DMG-ZOJ). The game is set during Century Zero, the main battle/war between two rival nations: the Helic Republic and Zenebas Empire. Their main weapons are Zoids and the battle/war takes place on Planet Zi.

The Zenebas Zoids were mostly red and silver and more armored, the Helic more skeletal and favoring blue and grey. The player can choose to play either role.

=== Zoids, Jashin Fukkatsu! Geno Breaker Hen (Evil God Revived! Geno Breaker Story) (Game Boy & Game Boy Color) ===
Jashin Fukkatsu is a Game Boy and Game Boy Color game. The game's first two production runs were released with a limited edition Command Wolf model kit: red Imperial colors for the first run, and midnight blue and black for the second.

The story is said to be set between the Zoids: Chaotic Century and Zoids: Guardian Force anime series, and involves characters from that era. The game is notable for containing every original Japanese release Zoid (other than Transfighters and 1/24 scale), as well as many customs from old boxes, early Zoids from the new line, and a few customs from a contest.

=== Zoids, Shirogane no Juukishin Liger Zero (Silver Beast Machine God Liger Zero) (Game Boy Color) ===
Designed specifically for the Game Boy Color, this game features the adventures of Alster and his silver Liger Zero. During a battle, he and his rival Solid (who pilots a Super Geno Saurer, a variant with four long-range cannons) fall into an underground world. Alster teams up with a girl he meets there, Palty, to combat the unpiloted Berserk Führer that has been attacking villages, as his Liger Zero is foretold to be the underground world's savior and thus the only one that can stop it.

=== Zoids Saga (Game Boy Color, Advance and DS) ===
Zoids Saga is a series of RPG games released for the Game Boy system.

- Zoids Saga
- Zoids Saga II (Zoids Legacy in Western release)
- Zoids Saga Fuzors/III
- Zoids Saga DS: Legend of Arcadia

=== Zoids Dash (DS) ===
Zoids Dash is an action title released for the Nintendo DS in 2006. It is a mission-based game that allows the player to control three Zoids. As is standard for Zoids games, parts are earned to upgrade the zoids.

=== Cyber Drive Zoids (Game Boy Advance) ===
Cyber Drive Zoids is a roleplaying game in the Zoids series, also available as a special edition package bundled with a Diablo Tiger Beta toy and a special infrared control unit that plugs into the data port of the Game Boy Advance. Cyber Drive Zoids enables fans of the Japanese toy and anime series to actually control motorized Zoids with their Game Boy Advance unit wirelessly. When controlling the Zoid, the GBA screen shows a special cockpit with information and read-outs. The RPG itself is similar to the Zoids Saga games, but features polygonal representations of Zoids as well as hand-drawn story segments. Both versions include the infrared adapter.

=== Zoids VS.i (Mobile Phone) ===
Released as a downloadable Java Mobile Phone game, Zoids VSe released on a handheld system.

== PC, Online & Arcade Games ==
=== Zoids Infinity (Arcade) ===
A series of Arcade games that can be used in conjunction with special swipe cards to unlock new features.

=== Zoids Online Wars (PC/Mac) ===
A pay-to-play online game with a battle format similar to that of the Zoids Saga series in which players would battle over the internet. Subscribers were given the chance to purchase a limited edition Shield Liger Commander model, the game was cancelled however, before completion.

=== Zoids Card Colosseum (Arcade) ===
A trading card game released on Japanese arcades.
