= Aqua Jack =

1989 video game

- Developers: Yoshinori Kobayasi and team
- Publisher: Taito
- Designers: Toshio Kohno; Masami Kikuchi
- Platform: Arcade
- Release: 1989
- Genre: Shooter
- Mode: Single-player
- Arcade system: Taito Z System

Aqua Jack (アクアジャック) (also released as Aquattack) is a 3D shoot 'em up arcade video game released by Taito in 1989. A hovercraft is piloted over water and land while dodging bullets and avoiding objects by shooting or jumping over them. Enemies are shot in the air and on water or land to advance levels.

== Reception ==
In Japan, Game Machine listed Aqua Jack on their October 15, 1989 issue as being the fourteenth most-successful upright/cockpit arcade unit of the month.
