= Super Rider (video game) =

1983 arcade video game

Super Rider screenshot

Super Rider is an arcade game released by Taito in 1983. The game was licensed to Venture Line for U.S. distribution.

== Gameplay ==
The player takes the role of a biker boy who must cross a road with obstacles and a very blocky background in order to buy a present for his girlfriend. The bike is able to jump to avoid the obstacles (cans, logs, police cars, etc.) and gaps in the road.

Sixty seconds are given to finish the course. After buying the present, the player is given 30 seconds plus the remaining time to cross the course again and go back home.

After this, the player will have a chance of crossing a bonus course with many money bags. Finishing the course without crashing any vehicle will be awarded with extra points. If the player manages to score 200.000 points, a credit is added.

== Reception ==
In Japan, Game Machine listed Super Rider on their June 15, 1983 issue as being the fifth most-successful new table arcade unit of the month.
