= QQQbeats!!! =

Rhythm puzzle game by Taito

- Developer: Taito
- Publisher: Taito
- Composer: Snail's House; (Note: Others composers who worked in the soundtrack are MASAKI, Kotaro Toda, Yuya Kobayashi, pizuya, uno, john=hive, Katahotori, D.watt, REDALICE and OGR)
- Platform: Nintendo Switch
- Release: WW: September 18, 2025
- Genres: Puzzle, rhythm
- Modes: Single-player, multiplayer

QQQbeats!!! (Note: Japanese: キュキュキュビーツ!!!, Hepburn: Kyukyukyu Bītsu!!!) is a puzzle and rhythm video game developed and published by Taito. It was released for the Nintendo Switch on September 18, 2025. The game features over 70+ songs, including tracks from Hatsune Miku, Ado, and virtual YouTubers, as well as classic arrangements from the Touhou Project franchise.

== Gameplay ==
QQQbeats!!! combines rhythm-based action with traditional bubble-shooter puzzle mechanics. Players match colored bubbles while pressing buttons in rhythm with the background music, requiring both strategic placement and accurate timing. Success depends on both strategic bubble placement and rhythmic precision.

The game includes multiple modes, such as a story mode, competitive multiplayer, and cooperative play. Both offline and online multiplayer are supported for up to two players.

== Development and release ==
Developer Taito announced QQQbeats!!! on July 10, 2025, with a scheduled release date of Fall 2025 as a digital-only title for the Nintendo Switch. The game was described as a "high-tension rhythmic puzzle game" which combines rhythm games with bubble-shooters. On September 3, Taito announced that the game would launch on September 18, 2025, with English and Japanese language options.

== Reception ==
Reception

Aggregate score
Aggregator	Score
OpenCritic	100% recommend (Note: Based on 6 reviews)
