= Grid Seeker: Project Storm Hammer =

1992 video game

Grid Seeker
- Developer: Taito
- Publisher: Taito
- Producer: Toshiaki Kato
- Designers: Tsushi Oshima; Yoshiaki Mizukami; Takafumi Kaneko
- Programmers: Takahiro Natani; Takafumi Kaneko; Mercury Hayashi; Jinji Tantou
- Artists: Lin Chinkai; Takashi Yamada
- Composer: Norihiro Furukawa
- Platforms: Arcade, PlayStation 2, Taito Egret Mini II (Arcade Memories Vol. 1)
- Release: Arcade: WW: 1992; PlayStation 2: WW: July 28, 2005
- Genre: Scrolling shooter
- Modes: Single-player, multiplayer
- Arcade system: Taito F3 System

Grid Seeker: Project Storm Hammer (グリッドシーカー) is a 1992 vertically scrolling shooter arcade game developed and published by Taito. Players control one of three different modern fighter crafts and can collect enemy bullets using shielded guns known as Grids.

== Story ==
In-game screenshot

In an alternate Persian Gulf War era: The fighting continued so much that many natural resources from the Middle East were destroyed in the process. In 1999, a Middle Eastern nation that was suffering severely from resource shortages took up arms and began attacking closer nations that were more economically sound so as to claim the resources for themselves. As the new war progressed, the aggressor nation began developing a secret weapon: a powerful military satellite with enough power to potentially lay waste to the entire world. With a weapon so powerful, conquering the holdout nations would be a task impossible to fail.

The nations that escaped from the ensuing battles formed an alliance against their attackers: with the aid of a new technology known as Gyrodrive Reactive Intercept Device (GRID), the alliance takes to the skies and strikes back at their enemies in the second Persian Gulf War.

== Game play ==
Though an otherwise basic vertical shooter, Grid Seeker featured a unique style of attack to players: by using their Grid item, a dual-firing shield similar to that of the Force from R-Type, players could absorb enemy shots using their Grid. As the Grid absorbed their shots, a meter would rise and eventually fill the player's bomb stock. The bombs varied depending on which weapon the players picked up.

Players could also change the position of their Grid by holding the fire button and moving up or down the screen.

== Fighter craft ==
Players could select from one of three available types of modern fighter craft:

- F-14 fighter jet: Fastest jet available, but also the weakest; armed with straight-firing shots.
- AH-64F attack chopper: An average fighter in speed and attack; armed with spread shot.
- B-2AT stealth bomber: The slowest moving fighter with the strongest firepower, particularly when upgraded.

== Items ==
P = Power ups which empower whichever weapon the player has picked up

H = Helper, an item which summons ally support from either large stealth jets or helicopters.

G = Grid changer, will change in color and will grant the player a different weapon depending on the color.

- Red: Hyper Vulcan, which shoots bolts of fire in the direction each GRID faces. Bomb: Nuclear, a massive fireball which releases a spiral of smaller fireballs.
- Blue: Cutter Laser, which shoots laser bolts straight forward. Bomb: Gigavolt Laser, a powerful, screen-tall twin laser that actually forces the player's fighter towards the bottom of the screen.
- Green: Multiple Sight, which generates clouds of green mist that pursue enemies. Bomb: Twin Dragoon, a massive plume of green mist that dashes towards all enemies in sight in sequence.
- Yellow: Fire Blaster, which shoots a fixed-range bolt that erupts into a cloud of yellow fire. Bomb: Chain Reaction, a sphere of yellow energy that can replicate as it destroys foes.

== Reception ==
In Japan, Game Machine listed Grid Seeker: Project Storm Hammer on their April 15, 1993 issue as being the twenty-first most-successful table arcade unit of the month.
