= VG Pocket =

Video game console series

VG Pocket is a series of handheld dedicated game consoles built by JungleTac in the 2000's and sold by Performance Designed Products LLC. The VG Pocket model was the first console of its type to have a 2" backlit color LCD screen.

== Description ==
The consoles have built-in games, the number of which varies with each model and many are clones and hacks of old Nintendo Entertainment System and arcade games. The devices also have a TV-out port with composite video and audio streaming through a non-standard stereo mini headset jack.

In 2008, the Caplet and Tablet models were also finalists in the International Design Excellence Awards; they were designed by Stuart Karten Design, a Los Angeles-based industrial design firm.

== Versions ==
There are five VG Pocket models available:

- VG Pocket Mini: 30 built-in games and a 1.5" screen.
- VG Pocket 50: 50 built-in games and a 2" screen.
- VG Pocket Max: 75 built-in games and a 2.5" screen.
- VG Pocket Caplet: 50 games, including licensed versions of Space Invaders, Bust-a-Move, and BurgerTime.
- VG Pocket Tablet: 25 games, including a licensed version of Frogger.

=== VG Pocket Max ===
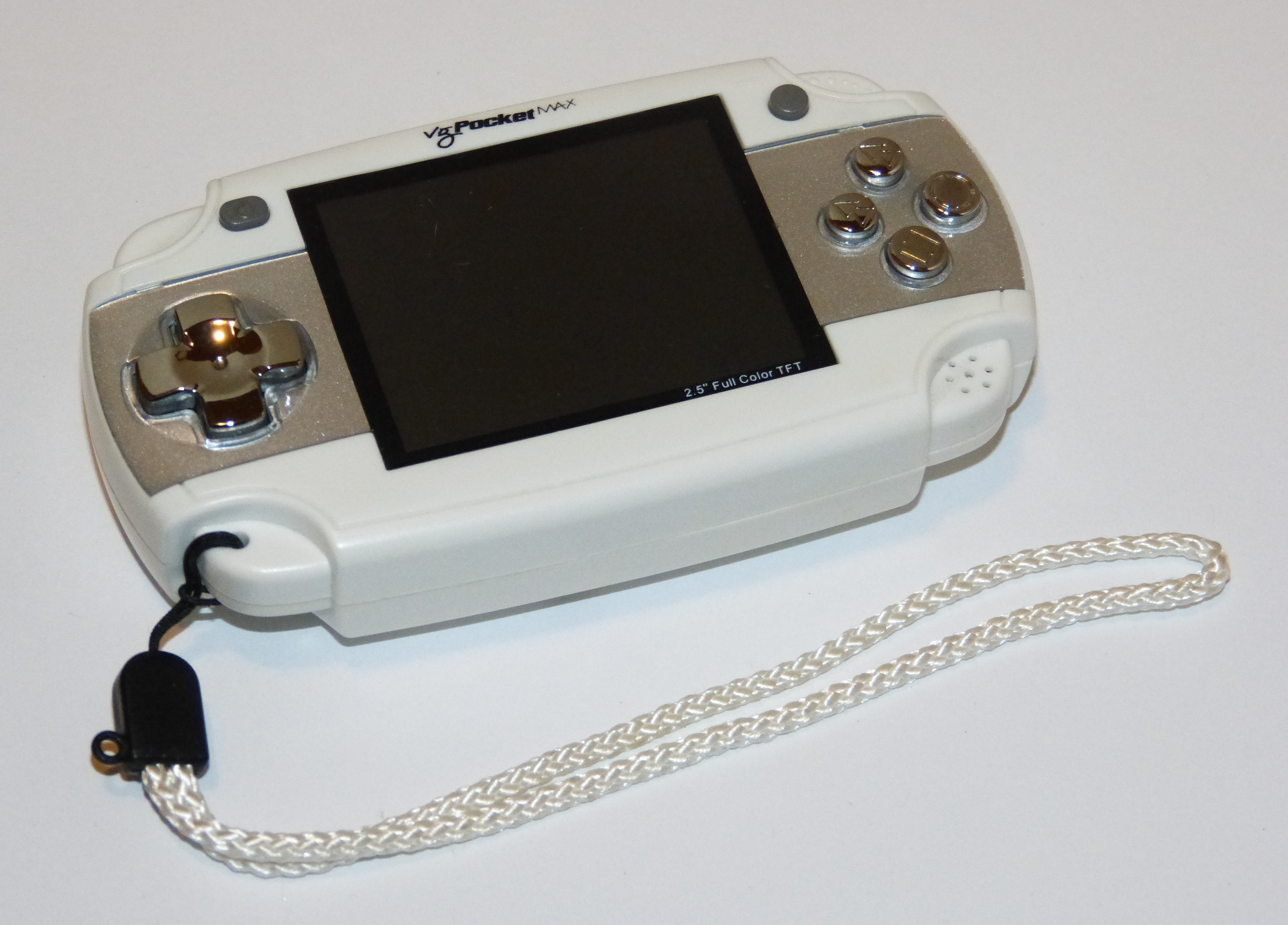
A VG Pocket Max system

The VG Pocket Max is a handheld dedicated console distributed by Performance Designed Products. It looks similar to the Game Boy Advance. The system contains 75 games, which are mostly modified NES games. It has a 2.5" backlit color LCD screen, four buttons (plus a reset and a power button), a directional pad, volume control, a single speaker, a headphone jack, and a TV-out port.

In the UK a handheld was made called the Gamespower 50. The Gamespower 50 contained almost all the games (with names changed, such as Bird Droppings retitled as Birdies Nest) and looked exactly the same, except with different color. A plug and play version was made by Dream Gear, being essentially the same as the Gamespower 50. The plug n' play looks like a Dreamcast controller, but internally there is not much of a resemblance. This version is more focused on racing games, and only has 30 to 40 games in it. Unlike the VG Pocket Max, both the Gamespower 50 and the plug n' play version lack a game category selection menu.

==== Games ====
Action

- Balloon Catcher
- Get It Right
- Jump
- Leap
- Night Monster
- Penguin Island
- Quick Match
- Road Works
- Sea Voyage
- Smash Ball
- Worm Catcher

Racing

- Autobahn
- Bandit Racer
- Bridge Driver
- Freeway
- Motor Rally
- Off-Roader
- Race and Ram
- Road Ace
- Road Race
- Road Rally
- Street Bike Racing
- Trucker
- World Racing

Shooting

- Air War
- Earth's Starfighter
- Mutant Hunt
- Quick Shot
- Sky Fighter
- Starcraft Attack

Sports

- Boat Racer
- Bulls-Eye
- Free Throws
- Knockem Down
- Rackets
- Surfs UP
- Target Shop

Wits

- Bird Craze
- Bird Droppings
- Bounce
- Cutterfly Catch
- Cats and Dogs
- Chuck Holes
- Dragon's Tail
- Drop and Stock
- Egg Catcher
- Fire Fight
- Flying Fish
- Fungi
- Fun Moves
- Globs
- Go Ball
- Go Bang
- Grow and Mow
- Jewel Master (Magic Jewelry hack)
- Marble Max
- Matching Dimonds
- Paddle Ball
- Paint Master (Brush Roller hack)
- Patch'n Go
- Pipelines
- Pool Pro
- Pop the Lop
- Puzzle Box
- Ricochet
- Risk It
- River Racing
- Sea Destroyer
- Sea World
- Sky Mission
- Smart Monkey
- Spin Ball
- Table Ball
- Tile Tizzel
- Wake the Baby

=== VG Pocket Caplet ===
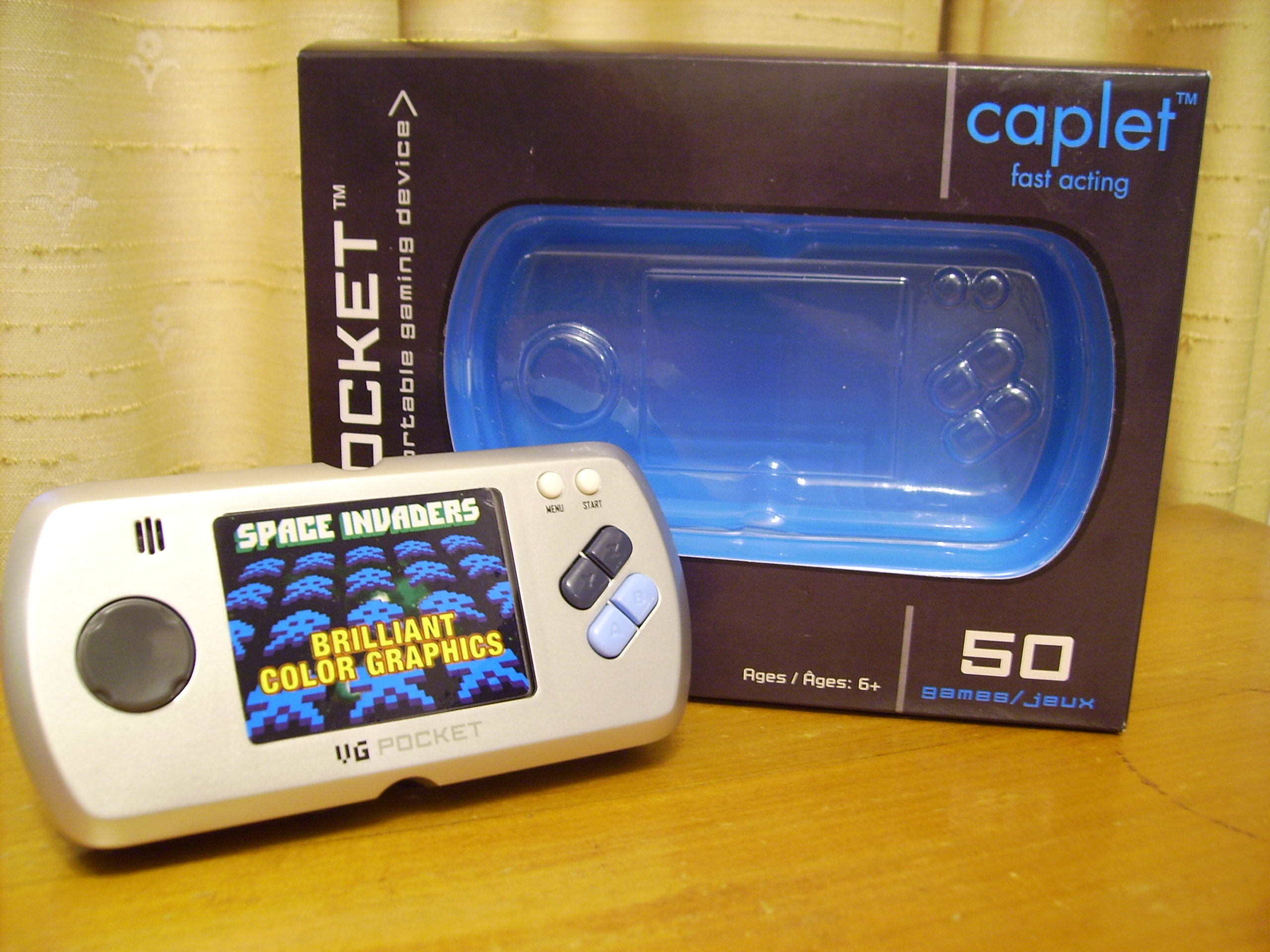
The VG Pocket Caplet

The VG Pocket Caplet is a dedicated console created by Performance Designed Products. Its graphics are upgraded from the earlier models of the VG Pocket, with a very bright 2.5" backlit 320×240 TFT display (the package claims its resolution is 960×240, counting the RGB triads to make 3× the number of pixels). It is a 16-bit system that appears to utilize some form of arcade emulation, since the majority of its games are either direct ports or clones of arcade games. The unit has the capability of being displayed on any TV set with the purchase of a separate "starter kit" that includes a storage carrying case and special AV cables unique to the system. There are no save features for high scores or game progress. Caplet comes in four colors: blue, silver, red, orange; and is powered by 3 AAA batteries.

Early versions of the Caplet contain 35 games, with the current version having 50. Both units have the same outward appearance. The packaging of the unit is the only way to identify how many games are on the system without turning on the unit. The unit initially retailed for $40.

==== Games ====
- Space Invaders (licensed Taito port)
- Bust-A-Move (licensed Taito port)
- BurgerTime (licensed Data East port)
- Sudoku Quiz (something of a misnomer, as there is no quiz included)
- Boxboy (Sokoban clone)
- Adventures of Waldog (platform game)
- Deep Storm (taken from Psikyo's Space Bomber; 3D shooter like Star Fox)
- Bubble Wubble (Tetris clone)
- Final Escape (Pengo clone)
- Wolfy's Quest
- Legendary Hero (Don Doko Don clone)
- Craig the Caterpillar (Susume!! Mile Smile clone)
- Crystal Cavern (Magical Drop clone)
- Final Round Tennis!
- Magic Jelly (In which the player's goal is to use bombs to change the color of every block on the screen, without leaping to death.)
- Blazebusters (Arkanoid/Breakout clone)
- Rotating Puzzle (animated slide puzzle game)
- Underwater Pinball (Arkanoid/Breakout clone)
- Bubble Blaster (Zuma clone)
- Greedy Grabber
- Puzzle Chance
- Victory Road (Frogger clone)
- Jet Racing (Pole Position clone)
- Yummy and Tasty (Gussun Oyoyo clone)
- Code Name: Plumber (platform game)
- Hanoi Tower
- Leapfrog
- Win or Lose
- Pop Goes the Ball! (Pang clone)
- Kart Racer X (overhead racer)
- Battle Blocks II (another Arkanoid/Breakout clone)
- Switch and Mix (Lights out clone)
- Survival Challenge
- Go Back Home!
- Motojet Mania (overhead racer)
- Tiger Rescue (vertically scrolling shooter similar to Aero Fighters)
- Billiards Master
- Mr. Onion
- Wacky Racing (Pole Position clone)
- Tennis Caddie
- Blaze of Glory (horizontally scrolling shooter)
- Underwater Memory
- Crane Maniac
- Go Bang
- Jewel Master 2
- Smashing Ladybugs
- Submarine
- Slot Machine (casino game)
- Video Poker (casino game)
- Black Jack (casino game)

=== VG Pocket Tablet ===
The VG Pocket Tablet is a portable handheld video gaming system created by PDP in 2006. The console is self-contained, as there is no cartridge slot, but rather it is pre-loaded with 25 games. It initially sold for $29.99. It has a round tablet-shaped design in four colors: orange, green, red, and white; a very bright 2” backlit 640×240 TFT display; and is powered by 3 AAA batteries. The unit has a port that allows connectivity to television via standard analog RCA port. The cable was available with the purchase of a separate “starter kit” that includes a storage carrying case and AV hookup cables, but is not an uncommon cable, also used for portable DVD players. Games included are remakes or clones of classic arcade and 8-bit console games. Many reviewers have commented on the surprising quality of the console's screen.

==== Games ====
- Frogger (licensed by Konami)
- Stellar Attack
- Motocross Racer
- Billiards
- Sudoku Quiz
- Mutant Hunt
- Funny Fungi
- Leaper the Frog
- Lord of the Jewels
- Off-Roader
- Risk It!
- Battle Blocks
- Construction Jack
- Memory Matching
- Track Star
- River Quest
- Star Alley
- Pinball Labyrinth
- Vitamania
- Mr. Onion
- Delivery Express
- Birds of Prey
- Whack the Critter
- Stuntman Daredevil
- Delta Fighter

== See also ==
- First generation of video game consoles
- Handheld electronic game
- List of dedicated consoles
- List of first generation home video game consoles
- List of retro style video game consoles
- Nintendo Entertainment System hardware clone
- Video game console
  - Home video game console
  - Handheld game console
  - Microconsole
