= Zoids =

Science fiction toy franchise

- Created by: Takara

Games
- Video games: List of Zoids video games

Miscellaneous
- Toy: Takara Tomy

Zoids (ゾイド, Zoido) is a Japanese science fiction media franchise owned by Tomy that features mecha called Zoids, with designs being based on animals including dinosaurs, mammals, insects, arachnids and mythological creatures. The franchise started as a line of plastic model kits and includes multiple anime series as well as video game and comic adaptations.

== Model kits ==
Zoids model kits depict robotic creatures and are typically motorized and able to move once constructed. The first Zoids toys were released in Japan in 1983 by Tomy. They began as simple model kits and later releases increased in complexity. Zoids model kits ranged in complexity to appeal to hobbyists with different skill levels.

== Media ==
The Zoids franchise has seen multiple adaptations in media such as anime, video games, comics, and manga. The first anime series was Zoids: Chaotic Century, which was followed by Zoids: New Century, Zoids: Fuzors, Zoids: Genesis, Zoids Wild, and Zoids Wild Zero. Zoids was adapted in the 1980s into a series of comics written by Grant Morrison and published by Marvel Comics. There have also been multiple Zoids video games.
