= Round-Up (video game) =

1981 video game

Fitter / Round-Up
- Developers: Taito (Fitter); Hiraoka (Round-Up)
- Publishers: JP/EU: Taito (Fitter); NA: Centuri (Round-Up)
- Platform: Arcade
- Release: JP: October 1981 (Fitter); EU: 1981 (Fitter); NA: December 1981
- Genres: Maze, strategy
- Modes: Single-player, multiplayer

Fitter, known as Round-Up in the Americas, is a maze strategy arcade video game released by Taito in 1981. The game was released as Fitter in Japan in October 1981 and in Europe the same year. Another Japanese company, Hiraoka, licensed a version called Round-Up to Centuri for release in the Americas in December 1981.

== Gameplay ==

The object of the game is for the player to maneuver a white robot within a maze, capture a red character robot as they move about the maze, and race to the center to change the 9 white balls located there to red. The player may only change one white ball to red at a time after capturing a red robot, and must evade 4 chaser monsters in the process. Bonus points may be earned when capturing the elusive 'red king' that appears on the screen. Capturing him will momentarily immobilize the chasers. Play is over when the chasers have captured all of the player's robots.

If the player is successful in changing all of the balls in the center to red, the pattern clears and then a new challenge is presented: a 3×3 or 4×4 tri-colored pattern will appear at the bottom of the screen and a slightly different tri-colored cube of corresponding size will appear at the center of the screen. The player may earn bonus points by moving the directional arrow and rearranging the colors of the cube at the center of the screen to match the sample pattern presented at the bottom of the screen. The player is given 90 seconds to rearrange the cube as many times as possible. Action returns to the maze whether the player wins or loses the cube challenge.
