= Under Fire (video game) =

1994 video game

- Developer(s): Taito
- Publisher(s): Taito
- Director(s): Naomitsu Abe
- Producer(s): Hisao Shimizu; Ichiro Fujisue
- Designer(s): Chiho Maeda; Miwa Kamiya; Miyabi Tashiro
- Programmer(s): Masaki Yagi; Yasuo Tsumori
- Artist(s): Hiroyasu Nagai
- Writer(s): Yosuke Tsuda
- Composer(s): Kazuko Umino
- Platform(s): Arcade
- Release: WW: February 1994
- Genre(s): Light gun shooter
- Mode(s): Single-player, multiplayer

Under Fire (Note: Japanese: アンダーファイアー, Hepburn: Andā Faiā) is a light gun shooter released as an arcade game in 1994 by Taito. The game uses graphics created using digitized photographs and two player gameplay using gun controllers, similar to Konami's Lethal Enforcers. Unlike Lethal Enforcers, the controllers are not traditional light guns but rather operate using infrared technology. They also provide force feedback when the player pulls the trigger. The game was never released for home consoles.

== Gameplay ==
Gameplay screenshot

This game is an arcade lightgun rail shooter that up to two players can play simultaneously. Players have individual life bars, and are armed with sub-machine guns. The players have to shoot the "Hoppers" down, without shooting innocent victims and fellow policemen.

== Plot ==
This game takes place in a locale similar to Wheeling, Illinois (the location of Taito Corporation's North American branch). A metropolitan city is being terrorized by a gang of criminal thugs known as "Hoppers". The problem has grown so bad that not even the regular city police can stop them. Upon seeing this, the mayor calls in a special police unit armed with sub-machine guns (presumably the H&K MP5) who are dedicated to stop the crime wave at all costs and give the city back to the law-abiding citizens. They are the only ones that can save the city from the Hoppers' criminal vicegrip on the city.

== Reception ==
In Japan, Game Machine listed Under Fire on their April 15, 1994 issue as being the sixth most-successful upright/cockpit arcade unit of the month. In North America, RePlay reported Under Fire to be the fifth most-popular upright arcade game at the time. Play Meter also listed the title to be the eighteenth most-popular arcade game at the time.
