= Taito Memories =

Video game series

- Genre: Various
- Developer: Taito
- Publisher: Taito
- Platforms: PlayStation 2, PlayStation Portable
- First release: Taito Memories Jōkan; July 28, 2005
- Latest release: Taito Memories II Gekan; March 29, 2007

Taito Memories (Note: In Japanese: Taito Memories (タイトーメモリーズ, Taitō Memorīzu)) is a series of video game compilations published by Taito in Japan. A total of five collections were released from 2005 to 2007 — four on the PlayStation 2, and one on the PlayStation Portable. The PlayStation 2 entries each have twenty-five titles, while the PlayStation Portable game has sixteen. The collections contain arcade games developed by Taito throughout the 1980s and 1990s. A similar series of collections, Taito Legends, was released outside Japan in North America and Europe, which retained many of the games included in the Taito Memories collections. The first two compilations sold a total of 145,616 copies. (Note: Taito Memories series sales: Taito Memories Jokan: 25,636 units; Taito Memories Gekan:)

== Games ==
=== Taito Memories Jōkan ===
The first entry, Taito Memories Jōkan, was released on July 28, 2005. It would be re-released under two different budget labels - first under the Taito BEST label on July 7, 2006, and the second under Eternal Hits on June 28, 2007. Among the included titles, KiKi KaiKai, Bubble Bobble, Syvalion, Cameltry and Metal Black are locked, and can be accessed by inserting a code in the title screen - the reprints of the game would have these games available from the start.

Games included in Taito Memories Jōkan
Title	Genre	Original release	Unlockable
Space Invaders Color	Fixed shooter	1978	No
Lunar Rescue	Fixed shooter	1979	No
Alpine Ski	Alpine skiing	1982	No
The Fairyland Story	Platform	1985	No
Kiki Kaikai	Multi-directional shooter	1986	Yes
Bubble Bobble	Platform	1986	Yes
Rastan Saga	Beat'em up	1987	No
Kurikinton	Platform	1988	No
Syvalion	Multi-directional shooter	1988	Yes
Bonze Adventure	Platform	1988	No
Cameltry	Puzzle	1989	Yes
Don Doko Don	Platform	1989	No
Flipull	Puzzle	1989	No
Ah Eikou No Koshien	Baseball	1990	No
Majestic Twelve: The Space Invaders Part IV	Fixed shooter	1990	No
Runark	Beat'em up	1990	No
Pu-Li-Ru-La	Beat'em up	1991	No
Metal Black	Horizontal-scrolling shooter	1991	Yes
Grid Seeker: Project Storm Hammer	Vertical-scrolling shooter	1992	No
Dungeon Magic	Beat'em up	1994	No
Space Invaders DX	Fixed shooter	1994	No
Darius Gaiden	Horizontal-scrolling shooter	1994	No
Elevator Action Returns	Platform	1995	No
Cleopatra Fortune	Puzzle	1996	No
Puchi Carat	Puzzle	1997	No

=== Taito Memories Gekan ===
The second entry, Taito Memories Gekan, was released on August 25, 2005. It would be re-released under two different budget labels - first under the Taito BEST label on July 9, 2006 and the second under Eternal Hits on June 28, 2007. Among the included titles, Qix, Elevator Action, Front Line, The NewZealand Story and Gun Frontier are locked, and can be accessed by inserting a code in the title screen - the reprints of the game would have these games available from the start. The ports of both RayStorm and G-Darius are instead the PlayStation versions instead of the arcade releases.

Games included in Taito Memories Gekan
Title	Genre	Original release	Unlockable
Space Invaders	Fixed shooter	1978	No
Space Invaders Part II	Fixed shooter	1979	No
Crazy Balloon	Maze	1980	No
Balloon Bomber	Fixed shooter	1980	No
Qix	Maze	1981	Yes
Wild Western	Fixed shooter	1982	No
Front Line	Maze	1982	Yes
Elevator Action	Platform	1983	Yes
Chack'n Pop	Platform	1983	No
The Legend of Kage	Hack'n slash	1985	No
The NewZealand Story	Platform	1988	Yes
Rastan Saga II	Beat'em up	1988	No
Raimais	Maze	1988	No
Insector X	Horizontal-scrolling shooter	1989	No
Cadash	Action adventure	1989	No
Violence Fight	Fighting	1989	No
Gun Frontier	Vertical-scrolling shooter	1990	Yes
Hat Trick Hero	Football	1990	No
Liquid Kids	Platform	1990	No
Arabian Magic	Hack'n slash	1992	No
Space Invaders '95	Fixed shooter	1995	No
Gekirindan	Vertical-scrolling shooter	1995	No
Puzzle Bobble 2	Puzzle	1995	No
RayStorm	Vertical-scrolling shooter	1996	No
G-Darius	Horizontal-scrolling shooter	1997	No

=== Taito Memories Pocket ===
This compilation is a portable version only available for the PlayStation Portable, and was released in Japan on January 5, 2006. It includes 16 titles, four of which are featuring an additional remake version.

Titles included in Taito Memories Pocket
Title	Genre	Original release	Remake
Lunar Rescue	Fixed shooter	1979	No
Crazy Balloon	Maze	1980	Yes
Balloon Bomber	Fixed shooter	1980	Yes
Qix	Maze	1981	No
Alpine Ski	Alpine skiing	1982	No
Elevator Action	Platform	1983	No
Chack'n Pop	Platform	1983	No
The Legend of Kage	Hack'n slash	1985	Yes
The Fairyland Story	Platform	1985	No
Kiki Kaikai	Multi-directional shooter	1986	No
Rastan Saga	Beat'em up	1987	No
Kurikinton	Beat'em up	1988	No
The New Zealand Story	Platform	1988	No
Raimais	Maze	1988	No
Rainbow Islands Extra	Platform	1988	No
Cameltry	Puzzle	1989	Yes

=== Taito Memories II Jōkan ===
This compilation saw its release on January 25, 2007.

Titles included in Taito Memories II Jōkan
Title	Genre	Original release
Space Chaser	Maze	1979
Grand Champion	Racing	1981
Time Tunnel	Maze	1982
Field Day	Sports game	1984
Ben Bero Beh	Platform	1984
Return of the Invaders	Fixed shooter	1985
Gladiator	Beat'em up	1986
Kick and Run	Sports game	1986
Scramble Formation	Vertical-scrolling shooter	1986
Continental Circus	Racing	1987
Exzisus	Horizontal-scrolling shooter	1987
Super Qix	Maze	1987
Rainbow Islands	Platformer	1987
Operation Thunderbolt	Shooting gallery	1988
Cloud Master	Horizontal-scrolling shooter	1988
Fighting Hawk	Vertical-scrolling shooter	1988
Asuka & Asuka	Vertical-scrolling shooter	1989
S.C.I.	Racing	1989
Darius II	Horizontal-scrolling shooter	1989
Champion Wrestler	Fighting	1989
Space Gun	Shooting gallery	1990
The Ninja Kids	Beat'em up	1990
Dino Rex	Fighting	1992
RayForce	Vertical-scrolling shooter	1994
Bubble Memories	Platform	1996

=== Taito Memories II Gekan ===
This is the final compilation, released in Japan on March 29, 2007.

Titles included in Taito Memories II Gekan
Title	Genre	Original release
Field Goal	Breakout	1979
Phoenix	Fixed shooter	1980
Polaris	Fixed shooter	1980
Great Swordsman	Fighting	1984
Sea Fighter Poseidon	Horizontal-scrolling shooter	1984
Gyrodine	Vertical-scrolling shooter	1984
Buggy Challenge	Racing	1984
Typhoon Gal	Fighting	1985
Metal Soldier Isaac II	Vertical-scrolling shooter	1985
Halley's Comet	Vertical-scrolling shooter	1986
Land Sea Air Squad	Vertical-scrolling shooter	1986
Operation Wolf	Shooting gallery	1987
Full Throttle	Racing	1987
Plump Pop	Breakout	1987
Chase H.Q.	Racing	1988
Rainbow Islands Extra	Platform	1988
Final Blow	Fighting	1988
Volfied	Maze	1989
Night Striker	Shooter	1989
Battle Shark	Shooter	1989
Master of Weapon	Vertical-scrolling shooter	1989
MegaBlast	Horizontal-scrolling shooter	1989
Thunder Fox	Beat'em up	1990
Warrior Blade	Beat'em up	1991
Bubble Symphony	Platform	1994
