= Taito Legends Power-Up =

2006 video game

- European packaging artwork
- Developers: Empire Oxford; Mine Loader Software
- Publishers: JP: Taito; NA: Destineer; EU/AU: Empire Interactive
- Series: Taito Legends
- Platform: PlayStation Portable
- Release: JP: January 5, 2006; EU: October 6, 2006; AU: November 9, 2006; NA: May 17, 2007
- Genre: Various
- Modes: Single-player, multiplayer

Taito Legends Power-Up is a compilation of classic Taito video games released for the PlayStation Portable system. Patterned after the Taito Memories series for PlayStation 2, Power-Up marks the first release of the franchise on a portable gaming system. The Japanese version is called Taito Memories Pocket and has sixteen games. The Western versions remove Rainbow Islands Extra, and replace it with six other games, for a total of 21 games on the Western compilation.

== Games ==
Taito Legends Power-Up features 21 (16 in Japan) different games from Taito's back-catalog of arcade titles. Some of these games have appeared on the Taito Legends console releases, while others are exclusive to Power-Up. These titles include:

Titles included in Taito Legends Power-Up
Title	Release	Power-Up	Pocket (Japan)
Alpine Ski	1981	Yes	Yes
Balloon Bomber	1980	Yes	Yes
Cameltry	1989	Yes	Yes
Chack'n Pop	1983	Yes	Yes
Crazy Balloon	1980	Yes	Yes
Elevator Action	1983	Yes	Yes
The Fairyland Story	1985	Yes	Yes
KiKi KaiKai	1986	Yes	Yes
Kurikinton	1988	Yes	Yes
The Legend of Kage	1985	Yes	Yes
Lunar Rescue	1979	Yes	Yes
The NewZealand Story	1988	Yes	Yes
Phoenix	1980	Yes	No
Qix	1981	Yes	Yes
Raimais	1988	Yes	Yes
Rainbow Islands Extra	1988	No	Yes
Rastan Saga (Japanese version)	1987	Yes	Yes
Return of the Invaders	1985	Yes	No
Space Chaser	1980	Yes	No
Space Dungeon	1982	Yes	No
Space Invaders	1978	Yes	No
Space Invaders Part II	1979	Yes	No

Also included are deluxe versions of four games—Balloon Bomber, Cameltry, Crazy Balloon and The Legend of Kage. These versions offer upgraded graphics and extended gameplay.

Taito Legends Power-Up also utilizes the PlayStation Portable's game-sharing feature. Any of the games (original versions only) may be wirelessly transmitted to any other PSP, including those that do not own the full version of the game. Downloaded games remain resident within the PSP's memory until the unit is turned off.

== Reception ==
Taito Legends Power-Up received mixed reviews with an aggregate score of 60.60% on GameRankings. Greg Miller of IGN rated the game 7.2 (decent) for incomplete multiplayer support. Jeff Gerstmann of GameSpot rated the game 6.5 (fair), and criticized the omission of Bubble Bobble and Double Dragon, (despite Technōs Japan holding its rights), as well as including too many iterations of Space Invaders.

== See also ==
- Taito Memories
