= Kenji Kaido =

Japanese video game producer

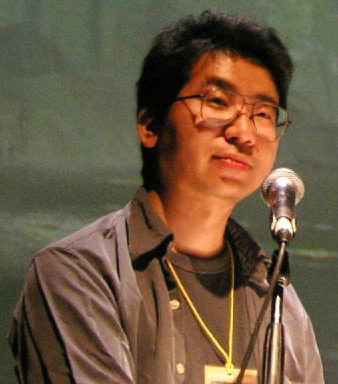
Kenji Kaido in October 2005

Kenji Kaido (海道 賢仁, Kaidō Kenji) is the producer of Sony Interactive Entertainment's Product Development Department #1 division.

Kaido started his videogaming career at Taito in 1987, where he worked as project leader and lead game designer on arcade titles Bonze Adventure, Night Striker, Champion Wrestler, Cameltry, Sonic Blast Man, Warrior Blade and Dead Connection.

Kaido then changed departments to work on the world's first Home Karaoke Console, the X55 (presently called MEDIA BOX) from its very beginnings. In 1996, he then worked as the project leader and lead game designer for coin-op game Cleopatra Fortune.

In 1997, Kaido left Taito and joined Sony Computer Entertainment Inc. There he started working on the game Ape Escape as its lead game designer and associate producer.

Most recently, Kaido worked as product manager and producer for Ico in 2001, and Shadow of the Colossus in 2005. He left Sony in August 2012.

== Works ==
- Bonze Adventure (1988)
- Night Striker (1989)
- Champion Wrestler (1989)
- Cameltry (1989)
- Sonic Blast Man (1990)
- Warrior Blade (1991)
- Dead Connection (1992)
- Cleopatra Fortune (1996)
- Tomba! (1998)
- Ape Escape (1999)
- Tomba! 2: The Evil Swine Return (2000)
- Ico (2001)
- Shadow of the Colossus (2005)
