= Taito Legends 2 =

2006 video game compilation

- Developers: Empire Interactive (Xbox, Win); Mine Loader Software (PS2)
- Publishers: PAL: Empire Interactive; NA: Destineer
- Platforms: Xbox, PlayStation 2, Windows
- Release: AU: 30 March 2006; EU: 31 March 2006; NA: 16 May 2007 (PS2); NA: 10 July 2007 (Win)
- Genre: Various
- Modes: Single-player, multiplayer

Taito Legends 2 is a 2006 video game compilation developed and published by Empire Interactive. The follow-up to Taito Legends, it is a compilation of Taito arcade video games. It was published for Xbox, PlayStation 2, and Microsoft Windows. As with the former collection, it is derived from the Japan exclusive Taito Memories series.

All three versions of the game were simultaneously released in March 2006 in Europe and Australia. The United States received the PlayStation 2 version on 16 May 2007 and the Windows version on 10 July 2007 with publishing by Destineer. For unknown reasons, the Xbox version was never released in North America. However, the European PAL-region Xbox version is entirely compatible with the North American NTSC-based Xbox systems without any modifications.

The PlayStation 2 version uses the same layout and engine as the Taito Memories series, while the Xbox and Windows versions use the layout and engine of Taito Legends with additional content on some games.

Eight of the 43 games - Balloon Bomber, Bubble Symphony, Cadash, RayForce, RayStorm, G-Darius, Pop'n Pop, and Syvalion - were split across the platforms due to porting issues, requiring players to buy more than one version to get every game available.

== Games ==
Taito Legends 2 consists of the following 43 arcade games when combined whilst each version contains 39 games. Balloon Bomber, G-Darius, RayStorm and Syvalion are exclusive to the PlayStation 2 version whilst Bubble Symphony, Cadash, Pop'n Pop and RayForce are exclusive to the PC and Xbox versions.

Titles included in the various versions of Taito Legends 2
Title	First release	PS2	Xbox	Windows	Taito Memories	Regional title
Lunar Rescue	1979	Yes	Yes	Yes	I Vol.1	
Balloon Bomber	1980	Yes	No	No	I Vol.2	
Crazy Balloon	1980	Yes	Yes	Yes	I Vol.2	
Qix	1981	Yes	Yes	Yes	I Vol.2	
Alpine Ski	1982	Yes	Yes	Yes	I Vol.1	
Front Line	1982	Yes	Yes	Yes	I Vol.2	
Wild Western	1982	Yes	Yes	Yes	I Vol.2	
Chack'n Pop	1983	Yes	Yes	Yes	I Vol.2	
The Legend of Kage	1984	Yes	Yes	Yes	I Vol.2	
The Fairyland Story	1985	Yes	Yes	Yes	I Vol.1	
KiKi KaiKai	1986	Yes	Yes	Yes	I Vol.1	
Bonze Adventure	1988	Yes	Yes	Yes	I Vol.1	Jigoku Meguri (Japan)
Kurikinton	1988	Yes	Yes	Yes	I Vol.1	
Nastar Warrior	1988	Yes	Yes	Yes	I Vol.2	Rastan Saga 2 (Japan); Nastar (EU)
Raimais	1988	Yes	Yes	Yes	I Vol.2	
Syvalion	1988	Yes	No	No	I Vol.1	
Cadash	1989	No	Yes	Yes	I Vol.2	
Cameltry	1989	Yes	Yes	Yes	I Vol.1	
Don Doko Don	1989	Yes	Yes	Yes	I Vol.1	
Insector X	1989	Yes	Yes	Yes	I Vol.2	
Violence Fight	1989	Yes	Yes	Yes	I Vol.2	
Football Champ	1990	Yes	Yes	Yes	I Vol.2	Hat Trick Hero (Japan)
Growl	1990	Yes	Yes	Yes	I Vol.1	Runark (Japan)
Gun Frontier	1990	Yes	Yes	Yes	I Vol.2	
Liquid Kids	1990	Yes	Yes	Yes	I Vol.2	Mizubaku Adventure (Japan)
Super Space Invaders '91	1990	Yes	Yes	Yes	I Vol.1	Majestic Twelve: The Space Invaders Part IV (Japan/USA PS2 release)
Metal Black	1991	Yes	Yes	Yes	I Vol.1	Gun Frontier 2
Arabian Magic	1992	Yes	Yes	Yes	I Vol.2	
Grid Seeker: Project Storm Hammer	1992	Yes	Yes	Yes	I Vol.1	
RayForce	1993	No	Yes	Yes	II Vol.1	Gunlock (Arcade), Layer Section (Japan), Galactic Attack (EU, USA)
Bubble Symphony	1994	No	Yes	Yes	II Vol.2	Bubble Bobble II
Darius Gaiden	1994	Yes	Yes	Yes	I Vol.1	
Dungeon Magic	1994	Yes	Yes	Yes	I Vol.1	Light Bringer (Japan)
Space Invaders DX	1994	Yes	Yes	Yes	I Vol.1	
Elevator Action Returns	1994	Yes	Yes	Yes	I Vol.1	Elevator Action II (USA)
Gekirindan	1995	Yes	Yes	Yes	I Vol.2	
Puzzle Bobble 2	1995	Yes	Yes	Yes	I Vol.2	Bust-a-Move Again (Western arcades): in PS2 release
Space Invaders '95	1995	Yes	Yes	Yes	I Vol.2	Akkan-vaders (Japan)
Cleopatra Fortune	1996	Yes	Yes	Yes	I Vol.1	
RayStorm	1996	Yes	No	No	I Vol.2	
G-Darius	1997	Yes	No	No	I Vol.2	
Pop'n Pop	1997	No	Yes	Yes	—N/a	
Puchi Carat	1997	Yes	Yes	Yes	I Vol.1	

The titles included in the Western release were taken directly from various volumes of the Japanese Taito Memories-series:

- Taito Memories Volume 1 (タイトーメモリーズ 上巻, Taitō Memorīzu Joukan)
- Taito Memories Volume 2 (タイトーメモリーズ 下巻, Taitō Memorīzu Gekan)
- Taito Memories II Volume 1 (タイトーメモリーズ2 上巻, Taitō Memorīzu 2 Joukan)
- Taito Memories II Volume 2 (タイトーメモリーズ2 下巻, Taitō Memorīzu 2 Gekan)

The only title included in Taito Legends 2 that was not previously included in the Japanese Taito Memories series is Pop 'n Pop, though an earlier standalone PlayStation port of the game was released in Japan.

In addition, the North American PS2 version replaces Puzzle Bobble 2 (the original Japanese version) with Bust-a-Move Again, the game's North American equivalent. It also has loading screens in RayStorm and G-Darius. That version of G-Darius has full motion video for the intro, ending, and some cutscenes.

== Reception ==
Reception

Aggregate score
Aggregator	Score		
Aggregator	PC	PS2	Xbox
Metacritic	78/100	67/100	80/100

Review scores
Publication	Score		
Publication	PC	PS2	Xbox
Eurogamer	N/A	7/10	N/A
GamesMaster	N/A	71%	N/A
GameSpot	N/A	6.1/10	N/A
IGN	7.5/10	7.4/10	N/A
Jeuxvideo.com	12/20	12/20	N/A
Official Xbox Magazine (UK)	N/A	N/A	6.5/10
PALGN	N/A	8/10	N/A
PC Format	70%	N/A	N/A
PC Zone	60/100	N/A	N/A
Play	N/A	52%	N/A
PSM3	N/A	40%	N/A
Superjuegos	N/A	8.4/10	N/A

The Windows and Xbox versions of Taito Legends 2 received "favourable" reviews, while the PlayStation 2 version received "average" reviews, according to the review aggregation website Metacritic. Major criticisms include the large amount of obscure and "filler" titles, all of which are from the Japanese Taito Memories collections in which they are little known in the U.S. (with GameSpot quoting: "There's really nothing legendary about most of the old arcade games found in Taito Legends 2"), as well as unresponsive, "flipped", and clunky controls. Kristan Reed of Eurogamer wrote a more positive response: "It's all but impossible to make an objective assessment that takes into account everyone's hugely varying tastes. What's definitely unarguable, though, that this particular package has much better presentation than the last one, with all games sorted into chronological order (a small but valuable point), and various useful options that make the experience far better than most retro collections". Some reviewers also compared Taito Legends 2 unfavorably with the Sega Genesis Collection, writing the aforementioned Genesis Collection as superior, and was also criticized for its lack of bonus content (asides from instructions panels that can be viewed in the main menu and during gameplay).
