= Rastan Saga =

1987 video game

Rastan
- European arcade flyer
- Developer: Taito
- Publishers: Taito; Imagine Software (CPC, C64, Spectrum); Hit Squad (CPC, C64, Spectrum); Sega (Master System)
- Director: Yoshinori Kobayashi
- Producer: Yoshinori Kobayashi
- Designer: Toshiyuki Nishimura
- Programmers: Yoshinori Kobayashi; Hideaki Tomioki; Touru Takahashi; Hideo Kazama
- Artists: Toshiyuki Nishimura; Taira Sanuki; Seiji Kawakami; Genya Kuriki
- Composers: Naoto Yagishita; Masahiko Takaki
- Platforms: Arcade, Amstrad CPC, Apple IIGS, Commodore 64, Game Gear, IBM PC, MSX2, Master System, ZX Spectrum
- Release: JP: March 1987; WW: April 1987
- Genres: Hack and slash, platform
- Mode: Single-player

Rastan Saga, (Note: Japanese: ラスタンサーガ, Hepburn: Rasutan Sāga) known as Rastan in North America, is a 1987 hack and slash platform video game developed and published by Taito for arcades. It was a critical and commercial success and was ported to home platforms.

== Plot ==
Taking place in a fantasy setting, the story is about Rastan who is presently a ruler of his kingdom narrating his past full of dangerous adventures and his eventual ascension to a kingship. Rastan, who back then was a barbaric knave resorted to banditry and murders to survive through hard times, came upon a chance to slay monsters and save a kingdom of Ceim from the said monsters in exchange of rich rewards. Accepting the deal, Rastan must fight hordes of enemy monsters based on mythical creatures such as chimeras and harpies. Rastan's quest to liberate Ceim from monsters eventually leads to a confrontation against a large fire-breathing red dragon with magical powers enabling it to control other monsters. Rastan was able to destroy the red dragon after a duel and after receiving rich rewards as promised, Rastan sets out to find a new region to establish his own kingdom and to rule it.

At the ending of the game, the king Rastan of present reveals that there are many more stories to tell in his ascension to kingship and the whole game was just a minuscule part of his grander tale.

== Gameplay ==
The controls consist of an eight-way joystick, a button for attacking, and a button for jumping. By using the joystick in combination with either button, the player can determine the height of Rastan's jumps, as well as the direction he swings his weapon (including downwards while jumping). The game uses a health gauge system along with limited lives, although certain obstacles (such as falling into a body of water or being crushed by a spiked ceiling) will instantly kill Rastan regardless of how much health he has left.

There are a total of six rounds, each consisting of three areas: an outdoor scene, a castle scene and a throne room where the player must confront the stage's boss. The backgrounds of the outdoor areas feature broad landscapes with changing sunlight effects with detail.

The bosses are, in order of appearance:

1. King Graton, a halberd-wielding skeletal warrior;
2. King Slay, a demonic winged sword-master;
3. Symplegades, the wizard-king;
4. Laios, the dragon-king;
5. The Hydra, a five-headed snake-like monster;
6. The Dragon

The player can pick up any item by touching it, as well as new weapons by striking them with his current one. All the weapons and power-ups picked by Rastan will be equipped only for a limited time, except for the Ring power up. The Ring will remain equipped on Rastan for the entirety of his current life, even carrying over to the next stage. When Rastan picks up any equipable item, an icon will appear on the lower right corner of the screen as an indicator of the item's effect until it wears out. Rastan can only wield one weapon at a time (a mace, an axe, a fireball-shooting sword, or his standard sword), as well as only one type of protector (a shield, a mantle, or a body armor), but other items (such as the necklace and ring) can be worn at the same time. There are also jewels that gives out bonus points, as well potion bottles that restore or deplete the player's health depending on the color. The rare golden sheep's head restores Rastan's health completely.

== Regional differences ==
Rastan Saga (the Japanese version) features an opening sequence, when the player starts the game, which explains the purpose of Rastan's journey. It is not included in the versions released in other countries (which are simply titled Rastan). Also, in the Japanese version when the player completes a stage ("Round") the "victory" screen has text pertaining to the storyline. In the international versions, there is a "generic" victory screen with generic text ("You are a brave fighter to have cleared such a difficult stage"). However, the international versions feature a different attract sequence which shows all the items that can be obtained by the player along with their effect.

In the Japanese version there are far fewer bats during the bat swarm sequences in the castle of level 1 than in other versions.

In Europe, the arcade game was originally released with its Japanese title Rastan Saga.

== Ports ==
Rastan Saga was initially ported to various 8-bit home computers in Europe (the Commodore 64, ZX Spectrum and Amstrad CPC) by Imagine Software in 1987. Taito imported Imagine's C64 version to the United States in 1988 and also released in 1990 two additional ports for the IBM PC and Apple IIGS, both of which were developed by Novalogic.

An unreleased version for the Atari ST was discovered in demo form only.

In 1988, Taito developed its own conversions for the MSX2 in Japan, and the Master System in North America and Europe. Both ports featured redesigned level layouts, with the Master System version replacing some of the boss characters as well. The latter was itself ported to the Game Gear and released exclusively in Japan on August 9, 1991.

== Reception ==
Reception

Review scores
Publication	Score		
Publication	Arcade	Master System	ZX
Computer and Video Games	Positive		
Sinclair User	Positive		
Your Sinclair	Positive		9/10
Computer Entertainer		6.5/8	
Console XS		88%	

Award
Publication	Award
Your Sinclair	YS Megagame

In Japan, Game Machine listed Rastan on their May 1, 1987 issue as being the second most successful table arcade unit of the month.

Clare Edgeley of Computer and Video Games reviewed the arcade game upon release, stating the "coin-op of the month has GOT to be Taito's superb Rastan Saga" with praise for the "beautifully drawn and very realistic" graphics, fast-paced action and addictive gameplay. Tim Rolf of Sinclair User called it a "hacking and a-slaying" game that is "very, VERY good." Peter Shaw of Your Sinclair also gave it a positive review in 1987, with the magazine later calling it the "best ever slash 'n' slice 'em up" in 1988. The game drew comparisons to the character Conan the Barbarian, Capcom's Ghosts 'n Goblins (1985), and Konami's Green Beret (1985).

Console XS reviewed the Master System version of Rastan Saga, giving it an 88% score. Your Sinclair reviewed the ZX Spectrum version, rating it 9 out of 10. The ZX Spectrum version was awarded 9/10 in the July 1988 issue of Your Sinclair, and was placed at number 54 in the Your Sinclair Top 100 list.

== Legacy ==
An emulation of the game is included in the compilations Taito Memories Jōkan only in Japan for the PlayStation 2 and Taito Legends for PlayStation 2 and Xbox in 2005, Taito Memories Pocket, and Taito Legends Power-Up for the PlayStation Portable in 2006. On March 17, 2020, it was included as part of Antstream Arcade for the Xbox One and Xbox Series X/S, and then on the PlayStation 4 and PlayStation 5 on September 6, 2024. In 2022, it was also made available on the Taito Egret II Mini dedicated arcade cabinet. Hamster Corporation released the game as part of their Arcade Archives series for the Nintendo Switch and PlayStation 4 in May 2024.

Rastan was followed by two sequels: Rastan Saga II (released as Nastar in Europe and Nastar Warrior in North America) and Warrior Blade. Rastan appears in another Taito game, Champion Wrestler, as a playable character.

The Saffire developed game Barbarian for PlayStation 2 and GameCube was published in Japan by Taito as Warrior Blade: Rastan vs. Barbarian. The game has nothing to do with Rastan despite the title.
