= MTJ =

MTJ may refer to:

- Maulana Tariq Jamil
- Magnetic tunnel junction
- Montrose Regional Airport (airport code MTJ)
- Mesivtha Tifereth Jerusalem, a yeshiva
- Fukio Mitsuji, video game designer (nickname)
- Married to Jonas, a reality show starring Kevin Jonas and his wife Danielle Deleasa
- Mendocino triple junction, a plate tectonic feature
- Martin Truex Jr., American professional stock car racing driver
- Agencja Artystyczna MTJ (MTJ Artistic Agency), a Polish record label
- Mathura Junction railway station (station code: MTJ), Uttar Pradesh, India
