= Gun Frontier =

Gun Frontier may refer to:

- Gun Frontier (manga), a 1972 manga
- Gun Frontier (video game), a 1990 video game
