= Elevator Action Old & New =

2002 video game

- Developer: Taito
- Publisher: MediaKite
- Platform: Game Boy Advance
- Release: JP: 20 December 2002
- Genre: Platform
- Mode: Up to 2 players

Elevator Action Old & New (エレベーターアクション OLD&NEW, Erebētā Akushon OLD&NEW) is platform video game developed by Taito and published by MediaKite in Japan for the Game Boy Advance in 2002. It is an update to the 1983 title, Elevator Action. The game consists of old and new game modes. Old Mode is based on the original arcade game.

In New Mode, player can choose between three characters (Robin, Berry, Fan) like Elevator Action EX, but bullet and grenades are now limited, and are counted as separate inventories. In addition, each stage has time limits. New items include sunglasses, bullet, watch and a hamburger. There are 8 buildings in 1-Player Mode. In 2-Player Mode, players can play cooperatively or against each other.

The fourth character (隠丸) can be unlocked in new mode by completing new mode with all the characters. This character has faster movement than others, can fall for one whole floor without taking damage, but it cannot gain or use automatic weapon, and has maximum 1 life point at the beginning of a building.

Famitsu's four reviewers gave the game scores of 5/10, 6/10, 6/10, and 7/10.

== See also ==
- Bubble Bobble Old & New
