= Taito Legends =

2005 video game compilation

- Developer: Empire Interactive
- Publishers: EU: Empire Interactive; NA: Sega
- Platforms: PlayStation 2; Windows; Xbox
- Release: EU: 14 October 2005; NA: 25 October 2005
- Genre: Various
- Modes: Single-player, multiplayer

Taito Legends is a compilation of 29 arcade games released for the PlayStation 2, Xbox, and Microsoft Windows. The games were originally developed by Taito. The European release was published by Empire Interactive, who had licensed the games from Taito and developed the compilation. Although they did not get official credit for it in the American versions, Sega published the North American and South American releases.

Extra features include interviews with some of the game designers, original sales flyers, and arcade cabinet art.

Two follow-up compilations were issued; Taito Legends 2 for the PlayStation 2, Xbox and PC and the PlayStation Portable exclusive Taito Legends Power-Up.

== Games ==
While the Western Taito Legends consists of 29 arcade games, the Japanese Taito Memories includes only 25 arcade games per volume, omitting Jungle Hunt, Colony 7, The Electric Yo-Yo, Zoo Keeper and Tube It.

Titles included in the Western and Japanese releases of the collection
Title	Arcade release	Taito Memories	Alternative title
Space Invaders	1978	I Vol.2	
Space Invaders Part II	1979	I Vol.2	Deluxe Space Invaders (USA)
Phoenix	1980	II Vol.2	
Colony 7	1981	No	
The Electric Yo-Yo	1982	No	
Jungle Hunt	1982	No	Jungle King (original) and Pirate Pete (official clone)
Zoo Keeper	1982	No	
Elevator Action	1983	I Vol.2	
Great Swordsman	1984	II Vol.2	
Return of the Invaders	1985	II Vol.1	
Bubble Bobble	1986	I Vol.1	
Gladiator	1986	II Vol.1	Ougon no Shiro (Japan)
Tokio	1986	II Vol.1	Scramble Formation (Japan)
Exzisus	1987	II Vol.1	
Operation Wolf	1987	II Vol.2	
Plump Pop	1987	II Vol.2	
Rastan	1987	I Vol.1	Rastan Saga (Japan, Europe)
Rainbow Islands	1987	II Vol.1	
Super Qix	1987	II Vol.1	
Operation Thunderbolt	1988	II Vol.1	
The NewZealand Story	1988	I Vol.2	
Battle Shark	1989	II Vol.2	
Continental Circus	1989	II Vol.1	
Plotting	1989	I Vol.1	Flipull (Japan)
Volfied	1989	II Vol.2	
The Ninja Kids	1990	II Vol.1	
Space Gun	1990	II Vol.1	
Thunder Fox	1990	II Vol.2	
Tube It	1993	No	Cachat (Japan)

Between 2005 and 2007, in total four similar compilations had been released by Taito for the PlayStation 2 in its home market of Japan:

- Taito Memories Volume 1 (タイトーメモリーズ 上巻, Taitō Memorīzu Joukan)
- Taito Memories Volume 2 (タイトーメモリーズ 下巻, Taitō Memorīzu Gekan)
- Taito Memories II Volume 1 (タイトーメモリーズ2 上巻, Taitō Memorīzu 2 Joukan)
- Taito Memories II Volume 2 (タイトーメモリーズ2 下巻, Taitō Memorīzu 2 Gekan)

The games on this compilation are emulations of their respective arcade originals; however, the software lacks light gun support for Operation Wolf, Operation Thunderbolt, and Space Gun. These games place a gun cursor on the screen, which the player can move around with the analog stick (console versions), or mouse (PC version).

The games that had to be altered due to licensing issues are Jungle Hunt and Rainbow Islands. Elements of Jungle Hunt had to be altered such as the design of the Tarzanesque character and the signature Tarzan yell due to licensing issues with Edgar Rice Burroughs estate. Rainbow Islands had to alter its music for the re-release due to licensing.

== Reception ==
Reception

Aggregate scores
Aggregator	Score
GameRankings	PS2: 71% (Note: Score based on 23 reviews.); PC: 75% (Note: Score based on 6 reviews.); XBOX: 74% (Note: Score based on 17 reviews.)
Metacritic	PS2: 68/100 (Note: Score based on 18 reviews.); PC: 75/100 (Note: Score based on 8 reviews.); XBOX: 74/100 (Note: Score based on 16 reviews.)

Review scores
Publication	Score
1Up.com	B
Eurogamer	8/10
G4	3/5
GameSpot	7.1/10
GameSpy	3.5/5
GameZone	7.9/10
IGN	7.8/10
Official Xbox Magazine (UK)	5.5/10
PALGN	7.0/10
PC Games (DE)	63/100
PC Zone	60/100
Play	73/100
TeamXbox	7.6/10

Taito Legends received "mixed or average reviews" for PlayStation 2 and Xbox according to review aggregators GameRankings and Metacritic; the Windows version received "generally favorable reviews". IGN praised the collection for a superb presentation, as well as the large amount of bonus material, but criticized some titles in the collection as "worthless filler". Other criticisms are the lack of online leaderboards, the omission of Arkanoid and Chase H.Q., the lack of light gun support for Operation Wolf, Operation Thunderbolt, and Space Gun, the lack of control configuration, and for the controls being "flipped", making it potentially uncomfortable and unnatural to many, less-adaptable players. Only the Windows version fixes the error regarding the collection's control scheme.
