= SGEM =

SGEM may refer to:

- Speak Good English Movement, a Singapore Government campaign
- Spy Games: Elevator Mission, a first person shooter by Dreams Co. Ltd.
