= Gun Frontier (video game) =

1991 video game

- Japanese arcade flyer
- Developer: Taito
- Publisher: Taito
- Producer: Takatsuna Senba
- Designers: Brody Tadashi; Takayuki Ogawa; Yasuhisa Watanabe
- Programmers: Naoya Kuroki; Takamasa Hori
- Artist: Hiroyasu Nagai
- Composer: Hidetoshi Fukumori (uncredited)
- Platforms: Arcade, Sega Saturn
- Release: Arcade: JP: January 1991; Saturn: JP: September 25, 1997
- Genre: Scrolling shooter
- Modes: Single-player, multiplayer
- Arcade system: Taito F2 System

Gun Frontier (Note: Japanese: ガンフロンティア, Hepburn: Gan Furontia) is a 1991 vertically scrolling shooter video game developed and published by Taito for arcades. It is set on the fictional planet of Gloria in the 22nd century, where an alien race of space pirates known as the Wild Lizards have invaded the planet and enslaved its inhabitants for gold extraction. Players assume the role of settlers who were part of the planet's colonization team, taking control of revolver-shaped fighter aircraft in an attempt to overthrow the invaders and free their surviving civilization from slavery.

Gun Frontier was conceived by Takatsuna Senba, and served as his first original work under the role of both designer and producer. The game was one of several created to promote the then-newly released Taito F2 System hardware. It had a turbulent development cycle, undergoing through various changes before its eventual launch for arcades. The game was later ported to the Sega Saturn in 1997 as part of Xing Entertainment's Arcade Gear series of releases for the console. It has since been re-released through compilations such as Taito Legends 2 in 2006, with each one featuring several changes compared to the original version. The game is dedicated to F2 System hardware engineer Katsujiro Fujimoto, who died during development in an accident.

Gun Frontier has been met with mixed critical reception from video game magazines and dedicated outlets since its initial launch in arcades and later on the Saturn. Despite its mixed response, Senba and some of the members in the development team would go on to create Metal Black for Taito after its release, which was produced under the internal working title Project Gun Frontier 2, although its actual connection to the original entry is loose. Battle Garegga and Recca programmer Shinobu Yagawa has since referred to Gun Frontier as one of his favorite titles.

== Gameplay ==
Arcade version screenshot

Gun Frontier is a space Western-themed vertically scrolling shooter game. Players assume the role of planetary settlers who formed part in the colonization team of planet Gloria taking control of revolver-shaped fighter aircraft through six stages, in a last-ditch effort to defeat the Wild Lizards and free their surviving people from enslavement by the space pirates. Players start with dual machine guns which are strengthened and multiplied by upgrades that come in the form of US dimes taken from buffalo-shaped enemies and every five dimes empowers the aircraft's firepower. Players also start with a set number of bombs that can be upgraded to deal further destruction against enemies and scenery by collecting gold bars from destroyed ground forces and once a player accumulates 25 bombs, they are granted access to the Bomber Max, the strongest of the player's bombs.

The direction of the blast radius of the player's bombs correspond to their movement. If the player moves their plane to the lower right of the screen and launches their bombs, then the direction the bomb will travel in the opposite direction of the aircraft's movement. This feature can only be used when a player has a large bomb count as only having one or two bombs will result in a small directionless explosion and like most bombs found in other shoot 'em ups released at the time, the bombs also work as a shield against incoming enemy fire. Bombing on determined locations is also crucial for reaching high-scores to obtain extra lives, as certain setpieces in some stages hosts a bonus secret within their scenery, as well as destroying enemies on certain spots.

A recovery system after using a credit during the continue screen is used, as players can pick up a spinning coin with two different sides: a silver side and a gold side. If the player collects the coin on its silver side, then the player merely gains another coin for their guns, but if the player collects the coin on its gold side, then the player's firepower and bomb supply will be maximized to their full power. The game also uses a checkpoint system in which a downed single player will start off at the beginning of the checkpoint they managed to reach before dying. The title also employs an anti-autofire mechanism where the difficulty will max out by the second stage if the player is sustaining too fast of a fire rate. Getting hit by enemy fire will result in losing a live, as well as a penalty of decreasing the aircraft's weapon to one level and once all lives are lost, the game is over unless the player inserts more credits to continue playing.

== Plot ==
Gun Frontier takes place in a futuristic sci-fi setting during the 22nd century. Mankind has managed to expand into the stars beyond the Milky Way galaxy and have started to colonize uninhabited planets through different solar systems, among them being the Earthlike planet known as Gloria, which harnesses an enormous natural supply of gold. This discovery would later prove to be pivotal in the emigration towards Gloria, so much that due to the expensive cost of reaching the location, immigrants would be impoverished. However, life on the planet thrived in an ambient similar to the American Old West. Although the Glorians were poor, gold trading aided them in advancing their technology and knowledge to the point where talented inventors and engineers lived among the inhabitants. However, the Glorians were not the only living beings tempted by the abundance of gold on the planet, as an alien race of space pirates known as the Wild Lizards quickly invaded the location, decimating towns and enslaving those who survived the assault for the purpose of gold extraction. Two Glorian inventors who were part of the planet's development teams decide to strike back against the invading aliens by taking control of revolver-shaped fighter aircraft.

== Development ==
Most of the enemies and bosses were hand-drawn sketches created by Senba before being transposed to pixel art graphics by Nagai.

The creation of Gun Frontier was helmed by Takatsuna Senba, a former animator whose previous game development works at Taito included Battle Shark, Darius II and Master of Weapon; Gun Frontier was Senba's first original project under the role of both designer and producer. Deeming it as an "important mission", Senba initially presented a game design document of more than 200 pages that took a month to prepare in order to get the project approved. Taito executives rejected the proposal several times before it was eventually approved, albeit with a lower budget than it was originally pitched with. Senba and his team were tasked on creating a shoot 'em up with a level of quality akin to an in-house project. The team was given a budget that would have been taken to outsource it under a deadline, which would have potentially laid the groundwork for future shoot 'em ups from Taito if the team were capable of performing such task. The game was also one of the many titles made to promote the then-newly released Taito F2 System arcade hardware.

Members of the Gun Frontier development team (which originally consisted of a small number of people) had previously worked on other Taito titles such as Cadash. Senba and his crew wanted to push the F2 System hardware as much as they could, but the project would go through a turbulent development cycle until it was released. None of the members within the team had experience on designing a shoot 'em up, and the crew had yet to be familiarized with the F2 System to make the project a reality, while Senba was later tasked with working on Majestic Twelve: The Space Invaders Part IV. Due to his experience with Darius II, Senba and the development team were constantly struggling to get the game as optimized as possible when creating graphics and sprites in order to not exceed the 64 kilobytes (65,536 bytes) memory limit. Members of the team would use calculators to constantly check if such limit was reached, while also learning how to harness the F2 System's capabilities and keeping the budget below that of Majestic Twelve.

Senba also played a part in Gun Frontier's development as an artist, and created the waterfall setpiece seen in the second stage; in a 2006 interview, Senba stated that this setpiece alone proved to be very difficult to implement in the game, since Taito's management division was very persistent in having the scene featured and the project was on the verge of being put on hold as a result. As such, he worked under very high temperatures that threatened to wipe out data from the computers due to overheating during the summer, in addition to other tasks. Despite these conditions, the scene managed to be integrated and the project continued to move forward. Hiroyasu Nagai also worked as an artist for the project as well.

Despite suffering many setbacks, the game managed to meet the deadline and was eventually launched to the market. In a 1991 interview with Japanese publication Micom BASIC Magazine, Senba recounted the creative process of the project, where he revealed additional development information, as well as various game ideas that were implemented. He stated that the reason for adding an anti-autofire mechanism was due to the programmers' desire to create a game with adjustable difficulty on the fly. Senba also revealed that the difficulty could also be increased by the number of enemies destroyed and other factors, and that the team implemented bonus secrets in some of the stages as an internal response from two Taito employees who managed to one-credit clear the game for longevity reasons before launch. Gun Frontier is dedicated to F2 System hardware engineer Katsujiro Fujimoto, who died during development in a traffic accident.

Unlike other Taito productions, and despite both Hisayoshi Ogura and Yasuhisa Watanabe being credited as sound directors in the staff roll of Gun Frontier, the music was not composed by any member of Zuntata. Instead, the soundtrack was composed by subcontractor Hidetoshi Fukumori, who could not see the project in motion due to internal policies; the team would manage to let Fukumori test the game through an unconventional method of doing so. In a 2006 interview, Senba stated that he was asked by a Taito composer as to why he relied on a subcontractor for the project's music, and replied by saying that he felt no one would have created anything capable of matching his vision.

== Release ==
Gun Frontier was initially released for Japanese arcades in January 1991, making appearances at certain trade shows for attendees to play. The game was later ported to the Sega Saturn by GOO! and exclusively released in Japan on September 25, 1997, as volume 2 of the Arcade Gears series from Xing Entertainment. This version features several notable changes such as the enemy placement, visual glitches, audio issues and a lower difficulty level overall, even on the highest difficulty setting. Programmer Toshiaki Fujino stated that developing the Saturn version proved to be troublesome, as he could not implement the hidden bonus secrets due to Taito not informing him of their existence. However, the Saturn release improves the explosion animation seen after defeating a boss, and includes a strategy guide from video game magazine Gamest. In 2006, the game was also included in the compilation Taito Legends 2 for Microsoft Windows, PlayStation 2, and Xbox. Hamster Corporation released the game outside Japan for the first time as part of the Arcade Archives series for the Nintendo Switch and PlayStation 4 in August 2022.

== Reception ==
Reception

Review scores
| Publication | Score |
|---|---|
| Famitsu | (Saturn) 53% |
| M! Games | (Saturn) 29% |
| Zero | (Arcade) 2/5 |
| PlayStation Magazine (JP) | (Saturn) 18.8/30 |
| Saturn Fan | (SS) 5.8/10 |
| Sega Saturn Magazine (JP) | (Saturn) 5.66 / 10 |

Award
| Publication | Award |
|---|---|
| Gamest Mook (1998) | Grand Prize 7th, Best Shooting Award 5th, Best Production Award 5th, Best Graphic Award 3rd, Best VGM Award 8th, Annual Hit Game 34th (Arcade) |

Gun Frontier has been met with mixed critical reception from reviewers since its initial release. In Japan, Game Machine listed the game as the most successful table arcade unit of February 1991. In the April 1991 issue of Japanese publication Micom BASIC Magazine, the game was ranked on the number fifteen spot in terms of popularity. In a 2010 interview, composer Manabu Namiki regarded Gun Frontier as one of the shoot 'em ups he enjoys the most.

== Legacy ==
After the initial release of Gun Frontier in arcades, Senba and some members of the development team would later go on to create the horizontally scrolling shooter Metal Black for Taito, which was produced under the internal working title Project Gun Frontier 2; however, its actual connection to the original entry is loose at best. The science fiction third-person shooter PlayStation game Cosmo Warrior Zero features a fictional planet that bears a resemblance to Gloria as its main setting. In the 2010 self-published book by Cave, which chronicled their past and most recent works up to that point, Battle Garegga and Recca programmer Shinobu Yagawa regarded Gun Frontier as one of his favorite titles, with Yagawa revealing in a 2011 interview with Monthly Arcadia that he wanted to develop a game similar to it. A compilation album containing the soundtrack to the game, as well as the soundtracks for Metal Black and Dino Rex, was released in 2012.
