= Typhoon Gal =

1985 video game

- European arcade flyer
- Developer: Taito
- Publisher: Taito
- Platform: Arcade
- Release: NA: September 1985; JP: October 1985
- Genre: Fighting
- Modes: Single-player, multiplayer

Typhoon Gal (Note: Japanese: 女三四郎, Hepburn: Onna Sanshirou) is a 1985 fighting video game developed and published by Taito for arcades. It was released in North America in September 1985 and Japan in October 1985. The game's title is a pun on the 1942 novel and Akira Kurosawa's 1943 film Sanshiro Sugata, with the game's premise being a parody of the film; it is also one of the first video games with a female protagonist. Taito re-released the game in the compilation Taito Memories II Gekan in 2007. Hamster Corporation re-released the game as part of their Arcade Archives series for the Nintendo Switch and PlayStation 4 in September 2021.

== Gameplay ==
The player controls Yuki, a female student who practices judo in her free time and defeats fellow martial artists at rival dojos. The martial artists at the dojo approach Yuki from weakest, which appear in areas outside the dojo, to the strongest, the master which oversees the tournaments. Yuki can use various methods of physical attacks, including punches and kicks to subdue her opponents. She can jump to avoid attacks or land headbutts or throws in combination with the attack button. Enemies are defeated by throwing them and pinning them down for 20 seconds. The game ends when the master of the dojo or Yuki herself is defeated.
