= Syvalion =

1988 video game

- Japanese arcade flyer
- Developer: Taito
- Publishers: Arcade; Taito; SNES: JP: Toshiba EMI; EU: JVC Musical Industries
- Designer: Fukio Mitsuji
- Composers: Yasuhisa Watanabe (Arcade); Hayato Matsuo (SNES)
- Platforms: Arcade, X68000, Super NES
- Release: JP: October 1988
- Genre: Multidirectional shooter
- Modes: Single-player, multiplayer

Syvalion (Note: Japanese: サイバリオン, Hepburn: Saibarion) is a 1988 multidirectional shooter video game developed and published by Taito for arcades. It was designed by Fukio Mitsuji, creator of Bubble Bobble. It was released only in Japan in October 1988. It received a port to the Super Nintendo Entertainment System in 1992, which was also released in Europe.

The game saw numerous inclusions in various compilations and digital download services: it was re-released for the PlayStation 2 in Japan as part of Taito Memories Jōkan in 2005, and then received a Western re-release as part of Taito Legends 2 in 2006. Both versions feature analog stick support to make the game easier to play. Hamster Corporation released the game as part of their Arcade Archives series for the Nintendo Switch and PlayStation 4, as well as their Arcade Archives 2 series for the Nintendo Switch 2, PlayStation 5 and Xbox Series X/S in July 2026.

== Gameplay ==
The player uses a trackball to control a golden metal dragon which flies around, breathing fire at its enemies while collecting power-ups to recharge its fire. The enemies are robots and tanks. At the end of each level, the player fights a boss.

== Legacy ==
In Dariusburst, also from Taito, the boss named Dark Helios changes form and appears to be the metal dragon from Syvalion.

== Sources ==
- Syvalion at KLOV
- Syvalion at Arcade History
- Syvalion at GameFAQs (SNES version)
