= Night Striker =

1989 video game

- Mega CD cover art
- Developer: Taito
- Publisher: Taito
- Director: Kenji Kaido
- Producer: Tohru Sugawara
- Composer: Masahiko Takaki
- Platforms: Arcade, Mega CD, Saturn, PlayStation
- Release: Arcade: JP: October 1989; Mega CD: JP: 28 May 1993; Saturn: JP: 14 June 1996; PlayStation: JP: 28 July 1995
- Genre: Shoot 'em up
- Mode: Single-player
- Arcade system: Taito Z System

Night Striker (ナイトストライカー, Naito Sutoraikā) is a 1989 shoot 'em up video game developed and published by Taito for the Taito Z System. In the game, the player flies an armoured car shooting enemy invaders to destroy a terrorist organisation. Night Striker combines gameplay elements of Sega's Space Harrier and Out Run. Versions were released for the Sega Mega-CD in 1993, Sony PlayStation in 1995, and Sega Saturn (as Night Striker S) in 1996. A version was released on the Taito Memories II Gekan (Note: Taito Memories II Gekan (タイトーメモリーズII 下巻, Taitō Memorīzu II Gekan)) compilation for the PlayStation 2 in 2007. Night Striker received mixed reviews, and the Mega-CD version in particular was heavily criticized, primarily due to poor graphics. The music was composed by Taito's Zuntata sound team, and has been released separately.

Night Striker GEAR, a sequel developed and published by M2 for the Nintendo Switch and PC, is scheduled to be released in 2025.

== Plot ==
The game is set in a futuristic city in 2049. A terrorist organisation has kidnapped Doctor Masker Lindberry and his daughter. The United Nations Special Service Agency has dispatched their agents to investigate, but to no avail. Its leader is leading a task force (code named Night Striker) using armoured vehicles to rescue them and destroy the organisation.

== Gameplay ==
A typical game in progress

The player controls the car and shoots enemies encountered during the stage. Enemies and bosses include helicopters, aeroplanes, lorries, robotic spiders, and boulders. The car can be manoeuvred in a similar manner to Space Harrier and can be moved around the screen. There are 21 stages, although the player only needs to complete six to complete the game. Stages' themes include, factories, tunnels, and city themes such as centres, suburbs, and streets. Certain stages contain obstacles such as barriers which must be manoeuvred around. At the end of each stage, there is a boss, and after its defeat, the player is presented with a choice of route, like Out Run. The car's "armour" refers to its shield capability; the car can absorb a certain number of hits before being destroyed. Defeating a boss gives the shield the capacity to withstand another hit. If the shield has run out and the car is hit, the game is over. In certain final stages, the car transforms: depending on the stage, it can become vehicles such as a motorbike or a robot. The game features different endings depending on which route is taken.

The Mega CD version features an arranged soundtrack, and the Saturn version a bonus mode with six levels exclusive to this version.

== Reception ==
Reception

Review scores
Publication	Score
Computer and Video Games	87% (Arcade)
Mean Machines Sega	9% (Mega CD)
Sega Power	19% (Mega CD)
Sega Saturn Magazine (Japan)	5.33/10 (Saturn)
Your Sinclair	66% (Arcade)
Mega	23% (Mega CD)
Dengeki PlayStation	55/100, 50/100, 60/100, 45/100

Night Striker received mixed reviews. The Mega CD version suffers from poor graphics quality, as noted by reviewers. Mean Machines Sega noted that the graphics are "stupendously bad", and the sprites are "totally unrecognisable". Sega Power complained about the blocky sprites and lack of introduction and animated sequences, and also described the game as "unoriginal". The Japanese Sega Saturn Magazine gave a mediocre review. Neil West of Mega was especially negative: he criticized the graphics, saying the sprites, along with the flicker and "blocky" explosions, cause "a nightmarish mess of colour". He further condemned the lack of originality and challenge, and described the gameplay as "a shambolic travesty of modern entertainment". He described Night Striker as a "load of crap" and recommended that players "avoid this at all costs". The only positive comments he made were about the "fantastic" sound effects and "superb" music.

The arcade version fared much better. Computer and Video Games described the graphics as "beautiful", praised its action, and described the game as a "must-play". In Japan, Game Machine listed Night Striker on their August 15, 1989 issue as being the fourth most-successful upright/cockpit arcade unit of the month. Your Sinclair praised the rolling road sequences, and commented that the car would look like a blob on the ZX Spectrum.

== Music ==
The soundtrack was composed by Zuntata, and released on the Night Striker Complete Album on 21 May 1993 in Japan by Pony Canyon and Scitron. A similar album was released by Pony Canyon on 19 November the same year. The soundtrack was released on iTunes on 2 July 2008, and certain tracks were released on vinyl on Zuntata's Arcade Classics Volume One album.
