= MegaBlast =

1989 video game

- European arcade flyer
- Developer: Taito
- Publisher: Taito
- Platform: Arcade
- Release: JP: November 1989; EU: 1989
- Genre: Multidirectional shooter
- Modes: Single-player, multiplayer

MegaBlast (Note: Japanese: メガブラスト, Hepburn: Mega Burasuto) is a 1989 multidirectional shooter video game developed and published by Taito for arcades. It was released in Japan in November 1989 and in Europe the same year.

The game was re-released for the PlayStation 2 as part of Taito Memories II Gekan in 2007. Hamster Corporation released the game as part of their Arcade Archives series for the Nintendo Switch and PlayStation 4 in June 2023.

== Gameplay ==
Unlike most scrolling shooters, the player's spaceship is equipped with four turrets that can fire in multiple directions. The turrets can be individually empowered by touching and collecting orbs. The levels occasionally alternate between horizontal scrolling and vertical scrolling. Many of the minibosses humorously resemble previous Taito game characters.

== Reception ==
In Japan, Game Machine listed MegaBlast on their December 15, 1989 issue as being the twenty-first most-successful table arcade unit of the month.
