= Dexter's Laboratory: Robot Rampage =

2000 action video game

- Developers: Altron; Taito
- Publisher: Bay Area Multimedia
- Series: Dexter's Laboratory
- Platform: Game Boy Color
- Release: NA: November 28, 2000
- Genres: Action, platform
- Mode: Single-player

Dexter's Laboratory: Robot Rampage is an action video game published by Bay Area Multimedia for the Game Boy Color and released in the United States on November 28, 2000. It is a graphically redesigned version of the game Elevator Action EX, also developed by Altron, with characters from the American animated television series Dexter's Laboratory from Cartoon Network.

== Plot ==
As a part of Mandark's ongoing quarrel with Dexter, he decides to reprogram Dexter's robots and destroy his lab in the process. Forced to save it, Dexter has to rush to the lab in an attempt to find the deprogramming codes and defeat the enemies along the way.

== Gameplay ==
Dexter navigates platforms and enemies.

In Robot Rampage, there are 16 levels with similar designs. Each of them puts the player in a tall building that is full of doors, elevators and escalators. All the doors come in three variants: basic (where Dexter cannot go inside), box-marked (with weapons and health pick-ups), and lab door (contains a part of the code that is supposed to stop the robots). The player, as Dexter, runs through different levels via elevators, elevator shafts, small cars, ledges, and doors while battling robots with an assortment of weapons. Three different Dexter suits are available, though they have no effect on gameplay. Each stage ends with the player facing a line of enemies.

== Reception ==
Reception

Review scores
| Publication | Score |
|---|---|
| GameSpot | 6.9/10 |
| IGN | 7/10 |
| Nintendo Power | 3/5 |

Jeff Gerstmann of GameSpot gave the game a 6.9/10 in his review, complimenting it for its use of classic Elevator Action gameplay. IGN editor Marc Nix gave the game a 7/10, praising perceived improvements to the original, such as the added puzzles and life bar, but criticizing the game's lackluster stage endings. Nintendo Power rated the game 3 out of 5 stars.
