= Elevator Action =

1983 video game

- Japanese sales flyer
- Developer: Taito
- Publisher: Taito
- Designer: Toshio Kono
- Composer: Yoshio Imamura
- Platforms: Arcade, Amstrad CPC, Commodore 64, Famicom, Game Boy, MSX, NES, SG-1000, ZX Spectrum, Mobile
- Release: JP: June 1983; NA: July 1983; EU: January 1984
- Genres: Platform, shooter
- Modes: Single-player, multiplayer
- Arcade system: Taito SJ System

Elevator Action (Note: Japanese: エレベーターアクション, Hepburn: Erebētā Akushon) is a 1983 platform shooter video game developed and published by Taito for arcades. The player assumes the role of a secret agent infiltrating a 30-story building from the roof, then descending to ground level via elevators and stairways. Enemy agents emerge from closed doors and shoot at the player. The goal is to collect secret documents from specially marked rooms, then exit to a waiting getaway car. It runs on the Taito SJ System arcade system.

The game was a critical success and was the top-grossing game on the Japanese arcade charts for three months in late 1983. It has been ported to a variety of home systems and appeared on Taito compilations. An arcade sequel, Elevator Action Returns, was released in 1994.

== Gameplay ==
The player in an elevator on floor 28.

Elevator Action is a platform shooter. The player assumes the role of Agent 17, codename: "Otto", a secret agent. Otto enters a 30-story building at roof level with a goal of exiting at the ground floor, collecting secret documents (500 points per) whose locations are marked by red doors. Along the way, he must use the building's elevator and escalator systems to move from floor to floor and avoid or kill the enemy agents trying to stop him.

After picking up all the documents, Otto can escape to the basement and drive away in a waiting car to end the level (1,000 points times level cleared, up to 10,000). Otto can move left and right, jump, duck, and fire up to three shots at a time from his pistol. While Otto is in an elevator, the player can push up or down to send him to a higher or lower floor. He can jump across an empty shaft as long as the elevator is above him, and can ride on its roof but not control its motion or cross to the other side.

If Otto tries to leave the building without collecting all the documents, he will be transported to the highest floor that still has an unopened red door and must work his way back down. If he takes too long to clear a level, an alarm will sound. The enemy agents then become more aggressive, and the elevators will be slower to respond to the player's joystick movements.

Each building contains a section in which the lights are out, making it harder to see approaching enemies. On other floors, Otto can temporarily disable the lights by shooting one of the overhead fixtures. Otto is trained in shooting as well as karate. Otto can kill enemy agents by shooting them, jump-kicking them at close range, dropping a light fixture on their heads, or crushing them with an elevator. If he is shot or crushed, or if he falls down an open shaft, the player loses one life.

== Release ==
During the game's test phase in North America, Mike Von Kennel, marketing manager of Taito America, called the game a "top test piece" and held high expectations. It was released in Japan in June 1983, and in North America in July 1983. In North America, while also sold as a dedicated cabinet, it was Taito's first game to be sold as a conversion kit in that territory. It was available in Europe by January 1984.

== Ports ==
Elevator Action was first ported to the Family Computer by Micronics, and this version was published by Taito in Japan on June 28, 1985. The Famicom version was released in North America on the Nintendo Entertainment System in August 1987. Taito later made and published their own port of the game for the MSX around 1985. Around that same time, under license from Taito, Sega made and published a version of the game for the SG-1000. It was later ported to the ZX Spectrum, Amstrad CPC, and Commodore 64. A port was in development for the Atari 2600, but was cancelled.

The Famicom/NES version of Elevator Action was re-released for the Wii Virtual Console in Japan in April 2007, and in North America in March 2007. In February 2014, it was re-released exclusively in Japan for the Wii U Virtual Console, and for the 3DS Virtual Console in March 2014. It was re-released as part of the Console Archives series in November 2026.

The arcade version was re-released on the PlayStation 4 in October 2017, and on the Nintendo Switch in March 2019, by Hamster Corporation as part of their Arcade Archives series, as well as the Arcade Archives 2 series in November 2026. Elevator Action is included in the compilations Taito Legends, Taito Memories Gekan, Taito Memories Pocket, and Taito Legends Power Up. The game is also included in Elevator Action Returns S-Tribute as a hidden game, which players can unlock by clearing every stage.

== Reception ==
Reception

Review scores
| Publication | Score |
|---|---|
| AllGame | 3.5/5 (ARC); 3.5/5 (NES); 3/5 (C64); 2.5/5 (Mobile) |
| Eurogamer | 8/10 (ARC) |
| GameSpot | 5.2/10 (NES) |
| IGN | 6/10 (NES) |
| Nintendo Life | 6/10 (NES) |

Elevator Action quickly became a commercial success for Taito. In Japan, Game Machine listed it as the most successful new table arcade unit of July 1983; it then topped the magazine's table arcade cabinet charts from September through October to November 1983, and persisted on their charts up until March 1984.

In the first month of the North American release, the game was said to have "surpassed all expectations" in terms of popularity and sales by Keith Egging, the vice president of product development at Taito America. The game was reportedly popular with patrons at the 1983 Amusement Expo. Conversion kits for the game were also popular, and the number of kits sold set an "enviable record" for the company. It was among the top five highest-grossing arcade games of 1984 in American street/route locations.

It received a positive review from Computer and Video Games magazine in January 1984, with the reviewer stating it "has a really original theme" and considered it a "pleasant" change from the "normal spaceage" shoot-em-ups. In a 1984 issue of Video Games, Steve Harris wrote, "it was a good action game which allows for a great deal of player input", and while he feared that it might have been overshadowed by the laserdisc games of the time, thought the game was as competent as those. It received a Certificate of Merit as part of the 1985 Arkie Awards.

=== Retrospective ===
Eurogamer wrote that it was "astonishing just how playable it remains". In The Video Games Guide: 1,000+ Arcade, Console and Computer Games, Matt Fox wrote that the game was an "enjoyable arcade game", giving it three out of five stars according to the book's own rating system.

Reviewing the Taito Egret II mini-arcade version in March 2022, Metro said it is "simple stuff but enjoyable" and not as "ridiculously" hard. They also praised the "unusually deliberate action" and said it has elements found in the later games Impossible Mission, Rolling Thunder and Shinobi.

== Legacy ==
In 1991, a version of Elevator Action was made for the Game Boy, developed and published by Taito. While it retains the gameplay of the original arcade version otherwise, it includes new gameplay elements like power-ups and new weapons. A port of the game for EZweb mobile phones was released on April 15, 2004. This mobile version was later published in North America by Sony Pictures Digital around 2006.

A sequel, Elevator Action Returns, was released in arcades in 1994. Elevator Action EX is an updated version of the game released for the Game Boy Color in 2000. Elevator Action Old & New is a further update for the Game Boy Advance, published in 2002. A later remake of the game, titled Elevator Action Deluxe, was released on PlayStation Network on August 31, 2011. The game contains single player and multiplayer modes, as well as the original arcade game.

Spy Games: Elevator Mission is a 2007 first person shooter that was originally being developed to be a part of the series but developer Dreams lost the license after Square Enix acquired Taito in 2005 causing the team to scale the project down into a generic title. Its gameplay is reminiscent in which players explore a 50‑story building, riding elevators between floors while collecting five hidden data disks per level and shooting enemies along the way in first person.

Revealed at AOU 2009, Elevator Action: Death Parade is an arcade light gun shooter that uses physical elevator doors in front of the LCD screen when changing scenarios. In June 2021, UNIS then released Elevator Action Invasion, another arcade lightgun game.
