= Space Dungeon =

1981 video game

- Atari 5200 box cover
- Developer: Taito
- Publishers: Taito; Atari, Inc. (5200)
- Designer: Rex Battenberg
- Programmers: Arcade; Rex Battenberg; Atari 5200; Allen Merrell; Eric Knopp
- Platforms: Arcade, Atari 5200
- Release: Arcade; WW: July 1982; Atari 5200; NA: September 1983
- Genre: Multidirectional shooter
- Modes: Single-player, multiplayer

Space Dungeon is a multidirectional shooter developed and released as an arcade video game by Taito in 1982. Designed and programmed by Rex Battenberg, it was available both as a conversion kit and full arcade cabinet. Like Robotron: 2084 from earlier in 1982, Space Dungeon is a twin-stick shooter with a pair of 8-directional joysticks: one for moving, one for shooting. A port for the Atari 5200 was published by Atari, Inc. in September 1983.

== Gameplay ==
The player's green octagon on the left is fighting four enemies.

Space Dungeon is a shooter game in which the player controls a spaceship equipped with a laser cannon, which can fire a pulsing, solid beam in any of eight directions.

Each level of Space Dungeon consists of 36 rooms arranged in a six-by-six grid. Rooms are connected by open doorways of various sizes. One room in each level is the entrance, where the player begins, and another is the "Collect Bonus" room. Other rooms can contain laser defenses, hostile aliens, or various pieces of treasure. The goal in each level is to navigate using an automap to the room containing the "Collect Bonus" area, while visiting as many rooms and collecting as much treasure as possible along the way.

Higher scores are awarded for exiting each level with more treasures. A 10,000-point bonus is awarded if the player visits every single room on the level, whether or not all treasures on the level have been collected. An extra ship is also awarded to the player every time they score 10,000 points.

If the player's ship collides with an enemy or any of their spore shots before reaching the "Collect Bonus" cube, all collected treasure is dropped in the room where the ship was destroyed. This room is designated on the map by an "X". The player may return to the same room to retrieve their treasure, but if they are destroyed again before retrieving it, all dropped items will be lost.

A multiplayer mode is also available in which players may take turns after one player loses a ship.

=== Levels ===
The game counts from level 1 to 99, and upon completing 99, rolls over to zero. Levels two through nine, and then levels that are a multiple of one hundred, are preceded by a rhyme:

- The Thief's in view on level 2
- More to see on level 3
- Watch each door on level 4
- Stay alive on level 5
- Watch for tricks on level 6
- It's not heaven on level 7
- Meet thy fate on level 8
- You're doing fine on level 9

On reaching level 10, the game then displays "Sorry. No more rhymes." No further messages appear until the player rolls-over the level counter by completing level 99. At level 100, the level counter resets to zero, and the message displayed is "You're a hero on level zero." Thus this same "level zero" message will be repeated every hundredth level.

=== Enemies ===
- Piker (100 points). Slow-moving, spiked ships that attempt to collide with the player's ship. The player's laser must hit the core of a Piker to destroy it. Shooting of its spikes [confusingly called a "Piker (shield)"] awards 10 points each. If a Piker is left with its core intact, even if some of its spikes have been destroyed, then the entire Piker will be restored if the player leaves the room and returns.
- Corner Zapper (25 points). These always appears in sets of four, one in each corner of the room. They fire beams randomly and intermittently between different pairs, and the player's ship is destroyed if it gets caught in the crossfire. If any Corner Zappers are left intact when the player exit a room, all will spontaneously regenerate upon the player's return to that room.
- Deathsquare (25 points). Slow-moving obstacles. A single shot will destroy them.
- Guard (125 points). These red creatures tend to be found near treasure items, and mimic the player's movements, though at a slower speed, while shooting spores at the player.
- Executioner (125 points). These creates actively chase the player, firing spores and attempting to collide with the player's ship.
- Enforcer (250 points). These enemies, looking vaguely like a smiley face, will materialize in a room and charge at the player. It takes several shots to destroy an Enforcer, making it a high-priority target. If the player moves into another room with an Enforcer on the screen, the Enforcer will appear in the new room at the same location, and resume its charge.
- Spore Case (500 points). Spore cases neither shoot at the player nor move toward him, but if the player shoots one, it will spit out three spores, often in the direction of the player's ship. Spore Cases appear spontaneously after a short delay in all rooms, with more Spore Cases appearing over time, up to a total of four. Spore Cases first appear on level 3.
- Thief (50 points). The Thief moves around the dungeon autonomously and picks up treasure, but the player cannot kill him. When the player shoots him, he drops any treasure that he might be carrying and changes directions. He may also leave behind Guards if shot multiple times. The Thief first appears on level 2.

=== Treasures ===
- Iron Cross (500 points). Appears as a red cross.
- Copper Piece (1000 points). Appears as a red barbell.
- Silver Star (2000 points). Appears as a white star.
- Golden Fleece (4000 points). Appears as a white circle with a glowing middle. First appears on level 4.
- Platinum Ark (8000 points). Appears as a glowing circle with a white "I" in the middle. First appears on level 6.

== Ports ==
The only contemporary home version of Space Dungeon was for the Atari 5200, released by Atari, Inc. in September 1983. The game cartridge came with a dual-controller holder, allowing players to snap two 5200 controllers together and play using twin-stick controls. The game differs from the arcade original in that most of the objects are approximately four times the size, spores can be launched by enemies only in the eight ordinal directions, and the enemies are less aggressive.

== Reception ==
Reception

Review score
Publication	Score
AllGame	4.5/5 (Atari 5200)

The Atari 5200 version of Space Dungeon was reviewed by Video magazine in its "Arcade Alley" column where it was described as "such a triumph that not even the questionable 5200 controllers can spoil the fun." Dawn Gordon of MicroKids called the port "yet another Atari Supersystem standout." In 1995, Flux magazine ranked the Atari 5200 version 64th on their "Top 100 Video Games."

== Legacy ==
Space Dungeon is included in the 2006 PlayStation Portable compilation Taito Legends Power-Up.
