= Popils =

1991 video game

- Japanese cover art
- Developer(s): Tengen
- Publisher(s): Tengen
- Designer(s): Fukio Mitsuji; Jun Amanai
- Platform(s): Game Gear
- Release: JP: July 12, 1991; NA: 1992; EU: 1992
- Genre(s): Puzzle-platform
- Mode(s): Single-player

Popils, known in Europe as Popils The Blockbusting Challenge and in Japan as Magical Puzzle Popils (マジカルパズル・ポピルズ), is a stage-based puzzle-platform game for the Game Gear. It was released in 1991 by Tengen in Japan. It has the option of English or Japanese-language play.

== Plot ==
In a short animation at the start of the game, a beautiful Princess and a Boy fall in love. But the evil wizard named Popils kidnaps her and traps her inside an enchanted forest and it is up to the Boy to rescue her. When the game is completed the Boy and Princess are happily reunited and it's revealed Popils kidnapped the Princess because he was jealous and he loves her too.

== Gameplay ==
Popils is a single-player puzzle game in the form of a two dimensional side-view platform game. The player controls one character, a Boy through different stages (referred to as rounds) and must reach the Princess on every stage to complete it. Gameplay focuses on destroying blocks, avoiding enemies and spikes, and using various ladders and warp doors to reach the Princess. Each stage is one fixed screen and does not scroll in any direction and is completed when the Boy and Princess meet, or failed when either the Boy or Princess is killed, the Boy and Princess have no health and will die upon contact with an enemy, or falling onto a spike. The puzzle aspect is based on destroying certain blocks using the player's punch/kick/head-butt action. When a block is destroyed the column of blocks above it fall down one square and doing this can change the layout of the stage altering possible paths for the Boy, or for the Princess and enemies which move around. On many stages the player must move the Boy for the most part to reach the Princess, but in some stages movement of the Boy is restricted to a small area and the player must make him punch certain blocks to create a path for the princess to follow to the Boy.

=== Steps ===
The concept of steps is used to calculate score and whether a stage is completed perfectly. Punching/kicking/head-butting once is one step and walking or climbing one square (16 pixels) also counts as one step. To complete the game "perfectly" all 100 stages must be completed using the same or fewer number of steps as the mapper.

== Normal game ==
=== First game ===
Image created showing all the blocks and characters in the game

In normal game mode there are 100 stages of increasing difficulty, a stage select screen is shown where any available stage can be picked to play but only stages 1-5 are available at first. Completing any four stages unlocks the next five, and they do not have to be completed in any order or in sequence. Thus stages 1-10 are available to play after completing any four stages from 1-5 and stages 1-15 are available when any eight stages are completed until finally all 100 stages are available to play after any 76 stages have been completed. This means that player can choose to skip one stage out of each set of five and still be able to play stage 100.

On the stage select screen the player can look at all available stages. Uncompleted stages are displayed in greyscale, completed stages are yellow and may be played again. Also displayed is the number of steps the "mapper" or stage designer used to complete the stage and the fewest the player has used, if the stage has been completed; pressing the '1' button on the stage select screen reveals a hint as to how the player might go about completing that stage. The hints point you in the right direction but there is still thought and skill required to complete the stage.

Completing all 100 stages in any number of steps completes the game and show the credits and ending animation sequence. The game then encourages you to complete each stage "perfectly".

=== Second game ===
After completing the game once all stages are available to play, though the player may not have completed them all. If the player has completed a stage in the same or fewer number of steps as the mapper, the stage is displayed as "perfect" and coloured green on the stage select screen. Whether intentional or not some stages can be completed in fewer steps than the mapper, some by quite a difference. Others require pixel precision and use of movement tricks to equal or beat the mapper step count. When the player has completed all stages "perfectly" the credits are shown again with a slightly different ending sequence.

=== Secret Round ===
After completing the game "perfectly", and viewing the alternative ending, the player is given the chance to continue once more. If the player chooses to continue they're taken to a secret stage, Round 0, which has to be completed using a gameplay trick the player has not seen before in any of the other 100 stages of the game. The player can continue over and over and keep trying to beat Round 0. If the player powers off the console before they complete Round 0 and have activated the Resume feature they will be able to try it again the next time they load the game. If the player is not using the Resume feature, or when prompted chooses End rather than Continue, there is no way to get back to it during normal gameplay and the game will need to be completed "perfectly" again.

== Map edit, and Edited game ==
In map edit the player can create their own stages and test them, up to 30 stages can be saved on the cartridge. A stage must feature the boy and princess, can have 0-7 enemies, and if doors are used there must be two of each. Note all the normal game stages also follow the same rules. The Japanese manual includes screenshots of a selection of 10 stages that are not otherwise available in the game, that can be entered into the map editor and played.

== Reception ==
Reception

Review scores
Publication	Score
Beep! MegaDrive	6.0/10
Consoles +	95%
HobbyConsolas	85/100
Joypad	85%
Joystick	83%
Player One	86%
Tilt	18/20
Video Games (DE)	73%
Zero	90/100
Game Zone	88/100
Go!	87/100
Sega Force	85%
Sega Power	92%
Sega Pro	89/100

Popils was met with generally favorable reviews. Readers of the Japanese Sega Saturn Magazine voted to give the game a 7.75 out of 10 score, ranking among Game Gear titles at the number 34 spot in a 1995 public poll.
