= Fukio Mitsuji =

Japanese video game designer (1960–2008)

Mitsuji, Fukio
- Born: August 6, 1960
- Died: December 11, 2008
- Occupation: Game designer

Fukio Mitsuji (三辻 富貴朗, Mitsuji Fukio; 1960–2008), also known as "MTJ", was a Japanese game designer and artist.

Mitsuji is best known for his work at Taito, where he created popular arcade platform game Bubble Bobble and its follow-up Rainbow Islands. He later ran a game design school, and worked freelance creating games such as Magical Puzzle Popils for Game Gear.

According to reports from Japanese Bubble Bobble forums, Mitsuji died on December 11, 2008, at the age of 48. The cause was attributed to cardiopulmonary arrest caused by kidney problems.

== List of confirmed works ==
Title	Year released	Platform	Role
Super Dead Heat	1985	Arcade	Game Design & Character
Land Sea Air Squad	1986	Arcade	Staff
Halley's Comet	1986	Arcade	Designer
Bubble Bobble	1986	Arcade	Game Design, Character Design
Rainbow Islands: The Story of Bubble Bobble 2	1987	Arcade	Story and Game Design, Character Design
Syvalion	1988	Arcade	Staff
Darius II	1989	Arcade	Game Designer
Omega Fighter	1989	Arcade	
Volfied	1989	Arcade	Game Design, Character Design
Sybubblun	1990	X68000	Director, Graphic Design, Map Design
Magical Puzzle Popils	1991	Game Gear (unreleased PCE, NES)	Concept, Game Design, Graphics, Map Design
Star Trader	1992	X68000	Graphics, Map Design

== List of other works ==
Title	Year released	Platform	Reference
SegaSonic Bros.	1992	Arcade	Credit string in game data: ORIGINAL GAME CONCEPT BY MTJ
Tinkle Pit	1993	Arcade	Disabled title screen credit: ©MTJ/TENGEN LTD
Bonk's Adventure	1994	Arcade	Hi-score table initials: MTJ
