= Dead Connection =

1992 video game

- Japanese arcade flyer
- Developer: Taito
- Publisher: Taito
- Directors: Masaki Ogata; Ichiro Fujisue; Hidehiro Fujiwara
- Designers: Kenji Kaido; Jiro Tonegawa
- Programmers: Okazu Taiyaki; Yuichi Kohyama; Junichiro Noguchi
- Artists: Hisakazu Kato; Masami Kikuchi; Masahiro Kato
- Composer: Yoshiro Horie
- Platform: Arcade
- Release: JP: August 1992
- Genre: Multidirectional shooter
- Modes: Single-player, multiplayer
- Arcade system: Taito F2

Dead Connection (Note: Japanese: デッドコネクション, Hepburn: Deddo Konekushon) is a 1992 multidirectional shooter video game developed and published by Taito for arcades. It was only released in Japan in August 1988. The game takes place on September 5, 1953 "in a big city somewhere". It features a group of detectives who set out to fight a crime family. The game has a strong film noir vibe, shown through the appearance of the detectives and the featuring of a female protagonist. Each stage is preceded by a short cinematic interlude that explains the transition between the game's different locales. Hamster Corporation released the game outside Japan for the first time as part of their Arcade Archives series for the Nintendo Switch and PlayStation 4 in February 2025.

== Gameplay ==
When the player moves their character to within arm's length of an enemy, the shoot button triggers a melee attack. The player can also lie prone to evade gunfire, and perform a diving somersault in order to quickly take cover behind tables, plants, pillars, statues, and other fixtures. Instead of using scrolling each stage takes place against a non-moving but richly detailed backdrop—beginning with the lavish interior of a posh hotel. Most of the environment is destructible and the scenery becomes visibly degraded by bullet holes throughout the prolonged firefights.

== Reception ==
Reception

Review scores
Publication	Score
Computer and Video Games	69%
Sinclair User	80/100

In Japan, Game Machine listed Dead Connection on their October 1, 1992 issue as being the seventeenth most-successful table arcade unit of the month.
