= Sea Fighter Poseidon =

1984 video game

- Arcade flyer
- Developer: Taito
- Publisher: Taito
- Platform: Arcade
- Release: JP: March 1984
- Genre: Scrolling shooter
- Modes: Single-player, multiplayer
- Arcade system: Taito SJ System

Sea Fighter Poseidon (Note: Japanese: シーファイターポセイドン, Hepburn: Shī Faitā Poseidon), released in North America as Poseidon Sea Fighter, is a 1984 horizontally scrolling shooter video game developed and published by Taito for arcades. It was released in Japan in March 1984 and in North America the same year. Taito re-released the game as part of their Taito Memories II Gekan collection in 2007. Hamster Corporation released the game outside Japan for the first time as part of their Arcade Archives series for the Nintendo Switch and PlayStation 4.

== Gameplay ==
The player controls a scuba diver who journeys underwater on a water scooter to save companions from enemy scuba divers. Enemies can be defeated by shooting them with missiles or their water scooters, killing them in the explosion. Likewise, the player's water scooter will explode when shot, out of fuel or hitting an obstacle, damaging the player. The player can abandon the water scooter to prevent damage, though doing so renders them vulnerable to enemy attacks. Levels end after the player rescues all companions in the area.
