= Thunder Fox =

1990 video game

- Arcade flyer
- Developers: Taito; Aisystem Tokyo (Genesis)
- Publisher: Taito
- Designer: Hiroyuki Maekawa
- Programmers: Wolf Kato; Youichi Oki; Takahiro Natani
- Artists: Noritaka Kawamoto; Nishikawa; Kenji Hazama; Minako Morimoto; Koji Omae; Takashi Yamada; Seiji Kawagishi
- Composer: Kazuko Umino
- Platforms: Arcade, Sega Genesis
- Release: Arcade: NA: June 1990; JP: July 1990; Sega Genesis: JP: June 26, 1991; NA: 1991
- Genre: Run and gun
- Modes: Single-player, multiplayer

Thunder Fox (Note: Japanese: サンダーフォックス, Hepburn: Sandā Fokkusu) is a 1990 run and gun video game developed and published by Taito for arcades. It was released in North America in June 1990 and in Japan in July 1990. It was ported to the Sega Genesis in 1991.

== Gameplay ==
Thunder Fox is a horizontally scrolling shooter, where the players take control of agents Thunder and Fox. Thunder is more efficient with firearms, while Fox is better in using a knife. The levels are all divided into multiple sections, from a military base to a plane. The action is focused on close combat with using the knife to attack, but there are also other weapons dropped by enemies like grenades, flame-throwers, and handguns.

== Reception ==
In Japan, Game Machine listed Thunder Fox on their August 15, 1990 issue as being the thirteenth most-successful table arcade unit of the month.

Leisure Line magazine reviewed the arcade game and rated it 8 out of 10.

== Legacy ==
Thunder Fox was included as part of the Taito Legends compilation set for the Xbox and PlayStation 2 in 2005. It was later included on the Japanese-only Taito Memories II Gekan for the PlayStation 2 in 2007. Hamster Corporation re-released the game as part of their Arcade Archives series for the Nintendo Switch and PlayStation 4 on January 30, 2025.
