= Fighting Hawk =

1989 video game

- Developer: Taito
- Publisher: Taito
- Platform: Arcade
- Release: JP: March 1989; EU: 1989
- Genre: Scrolling shooter
- Modes: Single-player, multiplayer

Fighting Hawk (Note: Japanese: ファイティングホーク, Hepburn: Faitingu Hōku) is a 1989 vertically scrolling shooter video game developed and published by Taito for arcades. It was released in Japan in March 1989 and Europe the same year. It was re-released in the Taito Memories collection. Hamster Corporation released the game outside Japan for the first time as part of their Arcade Archives series for the Nintendo Switch and PlayStation 4 in May 2022.

== Gameplay ==
The player controls a plane which travels through battlefields and destroys enemies on land or in the air, in order to destroy a larger and more advanced plane. Its ammunition can be upgraded by power-ups, which increase the amount of bullets shot; a bomb attack is also available. The game ends after defeating the boss enemy at the end of the level, or having the plane be destroyed by enemy bullets.
