= Colony 7 =

1981 video game

- Flier promoting "extended weaponry"
- Developer: Taito America
- Publisher: Taito America
- Platform: Arcade
- Release: NA: 1981
- Genre: Shoot 'em up
- Mode: Single-player

Colony 7 is an arcade shoot 'em up developed and published by Taito's American division in 1981. It contains elements of both Space Invaders (developed by Taito of Japan) and Atari, Inc.'s Missile Command. Colony 7 was the inspiration for the successful Atari 2600 game Atlantis from Imagic.

In a feature branded as "extended weaponry," the player can change between several weapons, with each needing to be purchased separately as microtransactions through the arcade cabinet coin slot.

The game was re-released as part of Taito Legends.
