= Exzisus =

1987 video game

- Developer: Taito
- Publishers: JP: Taito; WW: TAD Corporation
- Platform: Arcade
- Release: 1987
- Genre: Scrolling shooter
- Modes: Single-player, multiplayer

Exzisus (Note: Japanese: イグジーザス, Hepburn: Igujīzasu) is a 1987 horizontally scrolling shooter video game developed and published by Taito for arcades. It was released in North America by TAD Corporation. The player controls a giant robot that can transform into a space-ship or be accompanied by robotic animal helpers in an attempt to free four planets from a mechanical enemy.

== Gameplay ==
Players control a giant flying robot that can walk along the surface of each level as well as crouch. The robot is equipped with bombs to fire from its back and guns to shoot simultaneously. By collecting A items, the robot can transform into a ship which had the advantage of adding one extra point of health and increasing speed. However, once the player transforms into the ship, the ship can not brush against the surface of the level or it would count as a hit. Despite that, the surface will disappear during boss fights, yet the ship and its bombs can still detect it, though the ship will not be damaged by it.

Any mechanical animals assisting the player during the robot form will converge with the robot once the A item was collected, combining their firepower. The levels contain checkpoints, though an on-screen map also shows the player how close to the end they are. While destroying enemy waves, there is always a midsection composed of various barriers that the player needs to avoid getting hit by such as asteroids and ice-blocks. During a boss fight, the map will change to the boss' health meter. Extra lives are awarded with every 100,000 points.

== Legacy ==
Exzisus was included in compilations of Taito arcade games: Taito Memories II Joukan for the PlayStation 2 in Japan and Taito Legends for the PlayStation 2, Xbox, and Microsoft Windows in North America and Europe. Hamster Corporation will release the game as part of their Arcade Archives series for the Nintendo Switch and PlayStation 4, as well as their Arcade Archives 2 series for the Nintendo Switch 2, PlayStation 5 and Xbox Series X/S in November 2026.
