= Cleopatra Fortune =

1995 video game

- Developers: Taito; Natsume Co., Ltd.
- Publishers: Taito; Altron
- Designers: Kenji Kaido (Taito X-55); Makoto Fujita; Seiichi Nakakuki; Shuya Takaoka (Arcade)
- Programmer: Moriyuki Kanaya
- Artists: Yasunobu Kosokabe; Isao Inoue; Kana Hirano; Kazuhiko Kawai
- Composers: Shuichiro Nakazawa; Hideki Takahagi
- Platforms: Taito X-55, Arcade, PlayStation, Saturn, Dreamcast, Mobile, PlayStation 4, Xbox One, Nintendo Switch, Windows
- Release: Taito X-55: JP: December 1995; Arcade: JP: September 1996; Saturn: JP: February 14, 1997; PlayStation: JP: May 17, 2001; NA: 2003; EU: February 7, 2003; Dreamcast: JP: June 21, 2001; Mobile: NA: September 5, 2003; PS4, Xbox One, Switch, Windows: WW: November 23, 2022
- Genre: Puzzle
- Modes: Single-player, multiplayer
- Arcade system: Taito F3 System

Cleopatra Fortune (クレオパトラフォーチュン), released in North America as Cleopatra's Fortune, is a 1995 arcade puzzle video game created by Taito in association with Natsume Co., Ltd.

== Gameplay ==
The gameplay is similar to Tetris in which the player has to direct blocks of stone, mummy and/or treasure to create closures which eliminates the treasure and adds to the player's score. Also if a full line of stone blocks, treasure blocks or mummy blocks is formed they will disappear in a similar fashion to Tetris and also add to the player's score.

== Release ==
The game was initially released in late 1995 for the Taito X-55, a home karaoke machine that was able to download music and games over a phone line. An arcade port was released the following year, followed by a PlayStation version and a Sega Saturn version that were released in Japan, along with a Dreamcast version in 2001. The PlayStation and Dreamcast versions were developed and published by Altron and feature redrawn graphics and a remixed soundtrack. The PlayStation version was released in the U.S. in 2003, while the original arcade game was included in Taito Memories Jōkan for the PlayStation 2 in 2005, and Taito Legends 2 for PlayStation 2, Xbox and Microsoft Windows in 2006. An arcade-only sequel called Cleopatra Fortune Plus was released in 2002 on the Sega NAOMI system. It was created in association with Altron instead of Natsume Co., Ltd. A port published by City Connection and based on the Saturn version titled Cleopatra Fortune S-Tribute was released for PlayStation 4, Xbox One, Nintendo Switch and Windows on November 23, 2022.
