= Halley's Comet (video game) =

1986 video game

- North American arcade flyer
- Developer: Taito
- Publishers: JP: Taito; NA: Coin-it
- Designer: Fukio Mitsuji
- Composer: Hisayoshi Ogura
- Series: Halley
- Platform: Arcade
- Release: JP: January 1986; NA: April 1986
- Genre: Scrolling shooter
- Modes: Single-player, multiplayer

Halley's Comet is a 1986 vertically scrolling shooter video game developed and published by Taito for arcades. It was released in Japan in January 1986 and in North America by Coin-It as their last arcade title.

== Gameplay ==
Arcade version

The player controls an armed space fighter defends various planets around the Solar System from a direct collision with Halley's Comet and the various alien swarms which accompany it, then infiltrate the inside of a comet to destroy it from within.

The game opens with the player above Earth with the message "Defend the Earth from comets!". The player ship must navigate two stages per planet in the solar system (including Pluto, as the game was released well before the re-classification of Pluto in 2006). As enemy waves spawn at the player, all surviving enemy ships, and in rare cases, shots, will proceed past the player down a mini-map on the right-hand side of the screen and impact the planet. Each impact causes a 1% increase to the planet's damage. If the planet hits 100%, the game is over, regardless of the remaining stock of player lives. Damages done to planets stays as they are and there is no way to reduce them; only increasing damages by survived enemies. Thus letting enemies escape is not acceptable in this game.

The first stage of each planet is divided by a mini-boss fight. This encounter is a large ship that fires large bullets in clusters at the player while standard enemy waves continue to spawn. The second half of the first stage ends with an encounter with the oncoming "comet" which will share the same color as the planet being defended (blue for Earth, yellow for Venus, Red for Mars, and so on). The comet boss will open a small section of its exterior, revealing a small patch of circuitry from which a bullet will spawn. When the player destroys 5 such openings, the comet will explode and allow the player ship to enter the comet, starting stage two for that planet.

Stage two for each planet encounter takes place inside the comet, which reveals to be an alien ship. Enemy waves continue to spawn until the player reaches the main boss for that planet. A large computer with 10 orange targets that will alternate between covered and uncovered, fires a bullet for each active target when opened. While all these battles go on both inside and outside of a comet, the comet slowly but surely continues to descend towards a stage's planet. If left unhindered, the comet will ultimately collide with and destroy the planet, resulting game over regardless of the remaining stock of player lives. The player must hurry destroying computers hidden inside comets while negotiating waves upon waves of enemy minions.

When the player destroys each of the targets, the boss explodes, and the planet is saved. The screen then changes to a bonus point calculation where points are awarded loosely based on the amount of damage the planet has taken during the level.

== Development and release ==
Halley's Comet was designed by Bubble Bobble creator Fukio "MTJ" Mitsuji. The music was scored by Hisayoshi Ogura. Mitsuji recounted its development process in a 1988 interview with Japanese magazine Beep, stating that the project originated from a conversation the staff had with the then-president of Taito about creating a title based on Halley's Comet. Mitsuji regarded the game to be important for him, as it started his development philosophy based on "thrills and pleasures". Mitsuji remarked that the PCB used for the title was underpowered and had no hardware-scrolling support, prompting the team to work with effort under severe limitations on making the background look as if it was scrolling.

Halley's Comet was first released by Taito in Japan in January 1986 and later by Coin-it in North America on April of the same year. The game was later ported to Japanese mobile phone platforms such as i-mode and Yahoo Mobile under the title Halley Wars between January 15, 2003 and January 16, 2004 respectively. Between 2007 and 2008, the title was also included as part of volume 2 in the Taito Memories II Gekan and Taito Memories II: Eternal Hits compilations for the PlayStation 2. Hamster Corporation released the game as part of their Arcade Archives series for the Nintendo Switch and PlayStation 4 in January 2021.

== Reception ==
In Japan, Game Machine listed Halley's Comet on their March 15, 1986 issue as being the second most-popular arcade game at the time. In North America, Play Meter listed the game to be the eight most-popular arcade game at the time, but the Japanese book Revived 20th Century Arcade Game Encyclopedia Vol. 2 gave the title a negative review. Cave programmer Hiroyuki Uchida stated in a 1998 interview that its gameplay served as a basis for Dangun Feveron. Likewise, former Toaplan composer Tatsuya Uemura claimed in a 2009 interview that Twin Cobra was influenced by Halley's Comet, as he wanted to portray the feeling of aiming and shooting.

== Legacy ==
A sequel, Halley Wars is a vertically scrolling shooter released on the Family Computer Disk System in 1991 and later on the Game Gear.
