= Champion Wrestler =

1989 video game

- North American arcade flyer
- Developer: Taito
- Publisher: Taito
- Platforms: Arcade, PC Engine
- Release: JP: August 1989; NA: April 1990
- Genre: Wrestling
- Modes: Single-player, multiplayer

Champion Wrestler (Note: Japanese: チャンピオンレスラー, Hepburn: Champion Resurā) is a 1989 wrestling video game developed and published by Taito for arcades. It was released in Japan in August 1989 and North America in April 1990. A port to the PC Engine was released the following year in Japan.

The PC Engine version was released on the Wii's Virtual Console in 2009. Taito released the game as part of their Taito Memories compilation for the PlayStation 2 in 2007. Hamster Corporation released the game as part of their Arcade Archives series for the Nintendo Switch and PlayStation 4 in September 2022.

== Gameplay ==
The player controls one in a series of thematically colorful pro wrestlers, including Rastan from the titular game, who compete against each other. Each wrestler must deprive their opponent of health points through attacks, making it easier to subdue the enemy by pinning them down or throwing them out of the ring. Each wrestler has unique statistics and special moves such as using weapons and spitting fire, the latter's power being determined by a power meter which can be filled. The game ends when either wrestler is pinned down or kept out of the ring for 20 seconds: the winner is depicted to be enjoying a luxurious life from the prize money, while the loser is comedically depicted as impoverished or decrepit.
