= Field Day (video game) =

1984 video game

- Japanese arcade flyer
- Developer: Taito
- Publisher: Taito
- Platform: Arcade
- Release: JP: May 1984; EU: 1984
- Genre: Sports
- Modes: Single-player, multiplayer

Field Day, released in Japan as The Undōkai (Note: Japanese: THE運動会, Hepburn: The Undōkai), is a 1984 sports video game developed and published by Taito for arcades. It was released in Japan in May 1984 and Europe the same year. It was later released as part of the Taito Memories series for the PlayStation 2. Hamster Corporation released the game as part of their Arcade Archives series for the Nintendo Switch and PlayStation 4 in July 2025.

== Gameplay ==
Players engage in a series of unconventional sporting events, such as tug of war and three-legged race, in a manner similar to Konami's Track & Field series and the same three-button layout. Each player must meet a certain requirement, such as successfully shooting a number of balls, finishing within a strict time limit or jumping a certain distance, in order to be able to play the next event; they can be disqualified if the requirements are not met. The game ends when players complete all seven events or are disqualified.
