= Aa Eikō no Kōshien =

1991 video game

- Arcade flyer
- Developer: Taito
- Publisher: Taito
- Platform: Arcade
- Release: April 1990
- Genre: Sports
- Modes: Single-player, multiplayer
- Arcade system: Taito F-2 System

Aa Eikō no Kōshien (嗚呼栄光の甲子園) is an arcade baseball game released by Taito in 1991. The game is played under normal baseball rules with the exception being that players can charge themselves up to attempt a better hit or pitch.

Screenshot

The game was re-released as part of Taito Memories in 2005.
