= Elevator Action Returns =

1994 video game

- Developer: Taito
- Publishers: Taito (Note: Re-released in 2022 by City Connection.); Ving (Saturn)
- Designers: Yusuke Tsuda; Koji Terada
- Artist: Toshiyuki Takenami
- Composer: Yasuhisa Watanabe
- Series: Elevator Action
- Platforms: Arcade, Saturn
- Release: Arcade: JP: 1994; Saturn: JP: 14 February 1997
- Genre: Run and gun
- Modes: Single-player, multiplayer
- Arcade system: Taito F3 System

Elevator Action Returns, (Note: Erebētā Akushon Ritānzu (Japanese: エレベーターアクション リターンズ). Saturn release stylized as Elevator Action² Returns.) also known as Elevator Action II, is a 1994 run and gun video game developed for arcades and published by Taito. It is the sequel to Elevator Action (1983), and expands upon its elevator-based gameplay mechanics. It also replaces the spy motif with a new scenario involving a paramilitary team fighting against a terrorist group.

The mostly well-received game was ported to the Sega Saturn and released in Japan only in 1997, and later included in Taito Legends 2 compilation release for the PlayStation 2, Windows, and Xbox in 2006. In 2022, it was included as one of the built-in games on the Taito Egret II Mini arcade cabinet.

== Gameplay ==
Arcade version screenshot

The game is controlled with an eight-way joystick and two action buttons (shoot and jump). The objective of the game is to enter all the red-colored doors in each stage and then proceed to the exit. If players miss a door, they will not be allowed to go any further after a certain point. Each player has a health gauge that shows the amount of damage that the playable character is allowed to sustain; when the gauge reaches zero, the player will lose a life. Many additions have also been made to the play mechanics such as four-way scrolling (the original could only scroll vertically), new moves and weapons, multiple characters and a two-player cooperative mode.

The player can uncover items by destroying objects in the scenery such as trash cans, garbage piles, sandbags and crates. There are also blue-colored doors that will give the player a random item through a roulette drawing system. Items include health refills, special firearms, sub-weapons and bonus points. Like in the original game, the player's default weapon is a semi-automatic handgun with unlimited ammunition. However, the player has the option to upgrade to a stronger firearm as well, a missile launcher or an automatic weapon. If the ammo for either weapon runs out, the player will revert to the default handgun. If the player picks up a weapon of the same type, the ammunition of the new weapon is added to the current amount.

The player can use a melee attack instead of firing a weapon. When an enemy is defeated with a close-range attack, the number of points awarded is doubled. The player can also attack enemies with a jumping attack depending on the timing. The player can also throw an explosive (which serves as the character's sub-weapon) by pressing the shoot and jump buttons simultaneously while standing or crouching. The type of explosive used by the player varies depending on the character. The player can use explosives to take down several enemies in a fixed range, allowing players to accumulate more points than by killing them with simple gunfire.

Objects in the environment can also be used to fight enemies. Like in the original game, elevators can be used to crush enemies standing above or below one. There are also oil drums that can be exploded with gunfire. Like the player's sub-weapons, they will leave a trail of fire that will burn off any enemy that comes in contact with it. Enemies that are killed by a trail of fire gives out more points. During the latter half of the game, the player will also have to deal with electric barriers that will harm both players and enemies alike. If an enemy is killed with an electric barrier, the player will be awarded with additional points.

The player will lose a life if the health gauge reaches zero, the time limit runs out, they fall more than 2 stories, or get crushed by an elevator.

== Plot ==
In the late half of the 1990s, a new terrorist group has made its move throughout the world, able to conduct its activities while overwhelming official investigations by government law agencies. An elite counter-terrorist unit, the DEF, has been formed to foil their plans. Composed of three elite paramilitary warriors scouted for their aptitude in urban combat, Kart Bradfield, Edie Burret, and Jad the Taff, only the DEF may be able to foil the terrorist's leader, Red Suit, and his plans to destroy global society and reign in his own new world order.

== Characters ==
The player can choose from the following three characters when starting the game:

- Kart Bradfield (age 23). A thin, blond, long-haired man, he is the fastest and most agile of the group. His default gun is a Glock 18, which he can upgrade into an AK-47 assault rifle or an MM-1 grenade launcher. His sub-weapons are hand grenades that explode and clear the whole floor. His health is moderate, but as the fastest runner of the group he can jump over obstacles better than the others. On the other hand he is the slowest shooter of the three when using his default weapon. Kart can perform three consecutive melee attacks on an enemy, instead of the default two attacks.
- Edie Burret (age 21). A brown-haired girl in a red tank top, who is the fastest shooter of the three. Her default gun is a Beretta M92F, which can she can upgrade into an MP5K submachine gun or an ARWEN 37 launcher. Her sub-weapons are incendiary grenades that produce a pool of flame that lasts a short while and kills off almost any enemy soldier that comes in contact with it (it does not harm the player though). While she has the lowest health of all the characters and moderate moving speed, she fires her default gun faster than any of the other characters.
- Jad the Taff (age 32). A tall muscle-bound man, he is the strongest and most durable of the trio. His default gun is a Desert Eagle, which he can upgrade into an M60 machine gun or an 80mm recoilless rifle. His sub-weapons are sensor bombs that explodes in fragments whenever an enemy comes within proximity. He has the most health of all the characters, has a middling rate of fire with his default weapon, but is the slowest walker. He will tackle any enemy standing in his way or crush certain objects while running.

== Release ==
A home version of Elevator Action Returns was released for the Sega Saturn in 1997 under the title of Elevator Action/Elevator Action Returns (stylized as Elevator Action² Returns), which includes the original Elevator Action as well. The Saturn version was ported by Ving. Elevator Action Returns was later included as part of Taito Legends 2 for the Windows, PlayStation 2, and Xbox in 2006, but both the PS2 and Xbox versions run in upscanned 640x448 resolution, which results in slight flickering, no scanlines and slightly blurrier image compared to the arcade and Sega Saturn versions.

An enhanced port titled Elevator Action Returns S-Tribute was released for Windows via Steam, Nintendo Switch, PlayStation 4, and Xbox One on December 1, 2022. The enhancements include modern features such as Rewind, Slow Mode, Quick Save/Load, Unlimited Credits, Stage Select, Increased Healing, more lives, and more.

== Reception ==
Reception

Review score
Publication	Score
SuperGamePower	3.5/5

In Japan, Game Machine listed Elevator Action Returns in their May 1, 1995 issue as being the ninth most popular arcade game during the previous two weeks. Next Generation reviewed the arcade version of the game, rating it three stars out of five, and stated that "Elevator Action 2 brings out the impulsive, frenzied, shooting psychopath in you, and in that, it's fun. But if this side of your personality is already spent, and ours certainly is, then you'll pass this classic shooter right up".

A 1997 import review by GameSpot gave it a score of 5.2/10, opining: "Elevator Action Returns is not a bad game, per se. But compared to what's out there, it's simply not worth the price of admission (around $60, on average, for an import). If it ever hits the States, it will be the perfect rental". Seventeen years later, Jeremy Parish of USgamer wrote "Elevator Action II was a game out of time. But it was well-made, if conceptually somewhat baffling, and like so many projects clearly borne of misguided enthusiasm it managed to be a lot of fun".

In a retrospective, Hardcore Gamer called Elevator Action Returns an "overlooked classic" and said it "deserves the same timeless honor and widespread acclaim as its classic 1983 predecessor". Darren Jones of Retro Gamer called in one of "many excellent 2D arcade hits never had a chance in the UK" and an "outstanding... fantastic sequel that totally blew away the original 1983 arcade hit" with gameplay features that "greatly improved upon those seen in the original game". Jones especially applauded its "superb visual style": "The many buildings that your agents explored were little more than derelict dumps that dripped with decay and graffiti; while your opponents looked like they'd just jumped from the frames of a 2000AD comic strip. And the violence... Bodies erupted in showers of blood, torched enemies writhed about in agony; the incredible animation simply elevated (sorry) the on-screen chaos to a beautiful ballet of mayhem that would have made John Woo proud. Best of all, the Saturn conversion was utterly flawless and even included the original game".

In 2005, IGN listed the "arcade-perfect" Saturn port among the best classic co-op games. Retro Gamer included it on their list of ten essential Saturn imports: "It's a wonderfully slick run-and-gun with gritty looking visuals, well-animated enemies and plenty of variety in its stages, as well as an excellent co-op mode".
