= Kurikinton =

1988 video game

- European arcade flyer
- Developer: Taito
- Publishers: WW: Taito; NA: World Games
- Platform: Arcade
- Release: WW: July 1988
- Genre: Beat 'em up
- Modes: Single-player, multiplayer
- Arcade system: Taito L System

Kurikinton (Note: Japanese: 功里金団, Hepburn: Kurikinton) is a 1988 beat 'em up video game developed and published by Taito for arcades. It was released in Japan in July 1988 and North America by World Games the same month.

== Gameplay ==
Players control a Chinese policeman who has been tasked with infiltrating an underground base to rescue a high-ranking police officer and his daughter, who have been kidnapped by a gang. Play consists of kicking and punching numerous enemies, sweeps and flying kicks can also be used. The game begins in an underground corridor populated by armored soldiers and fighters who throw shurikens. The player must follow the on-screen arrow which points them in the right direction as they proceed deeper into the caves and encounter greater numbers of more deadly enemies. A martial arts expert boss guards the exit of each level and quickly defeat the player-character if not fought carefully.

The player has one life in the game, represented by a health bar which drains as enemies land attacks on the player-character. Should the health bar drain completely, the game is over and a plump golden cherub will rise from the player-character's body. Should the player pay for another credit and continue the game, the cherub will dive back inside the player-character's body, who will in turn jumps to his feet with a shocked expression.

== Release ==
Kurikinton was eventually released in 2006 as part of the video game compilation Taito Legends 2, for Windows and the PlayStation 2 and Xbox games consoles and for PlayStation Portable on the compilation Taito Legends Power Up. Hamster Corporation released the game as part of their Arcade Archives series for the Nintendo Switch and PlayStation 4 in August 2021.

== Reception ==
Kurikinton has received a mixed response from reviewers and critics. Retrogames' staff member writing in a 2010 feature described the levels as bland, criticised the game's bosses for being effectively the same character with different colored clothes. Despite this, the reviewer stated "..there's something quite fun about the game that makes it difficult to put down..". Kung-Fu Master was suggested as a more readily accessible game with similar gameplay. ACE's Andy Smith was more critical when writing in 1988. He stated "Kurikinton's a dull game, the graphics aren't anything special and the game style's very old hat by today's standards." Computer and Video Games' 1989 review was more positive, the reviewer praised the game's "..large sprites and well drawn graphics" and stated "Kurikinton packs a hell of a punch and is far more playable than The Last Apostle."

As part of the Taito Legends 2 compilation the game was described as "..fairly standard side-scrolling brawler fodder.." by Eurogamer's Kristan Reed.
