= Land Sea Air Squad =

1986 video game

- Arcade flyer
- Developer: Taito
- Publisher: Taito
- Platform: Arcade
- Release: JP: February 1986; NA: July 1986
- Genre: Run and gun
- Modes: Single-player, multiplayer

Land Sea Air Squad (Note: Japanese: 陸海空 最前線, Hepburn: Rikukaikū Saizensen), released in Europe as Storming Party, is a 1986 run and gun video game developed and published by Taito for arcades. It was released in Japan in February 1986 and in North America in July 1986. The game was released in the Taito Memories compilation for the PlayStation 2. Hamster Corporation released the game as part of their Arcade Archives series for the Nintendo Switch and PlayStation 4 in March 2025.

== Gameplay ==
Land Sea Air Squad is a run and gun game similar to Capcom's Commando, where a sergeant navigates chaotic battleground and defeats enemies with a machine gun and grenades. While the player starts on foot and dies in one hit, tanks, helicopters and speedboats can be used to navigate levels on land, water or air, which speed up the player's progression while also providing extra hit points. A train occasionally appears and can allow the player to jump on top, but it can be destroyed and the player can be killed in its way.
