= Cadash =

1990 video game

- North American arcade flyer
- Developers: Taito; Cyclone System (Genesis)
- Publisher: Taito
- Director: Hiroshi Tsujino
- Producer: Keisuke Hasegawa
- Designer: Hiroshi Tsujino
- Programmers: Tohru Sugawara; Takamasa Hori
- Artists: Hiroshi Tsujino; Takatsuna Senba; Hisakazu Kato
- Composers: Pinch-Punch (Arcade); Toshiko Tasaki (Genesis)
- Platforms: Arcade, TurboGrafx-16, Sega Genesis
- Release: Arcade: JP: March 1990; NA: April 1990; TurboGrafx-16: JP: January 18, 1991; NA: November 1991; Genesis: NA: June 1992
- Genres: Action role-playing, platform
- Modes: Single-player, multiplayer

Cadash (Note: Japanese: カダッシュ, Hepburn: Kadasshu) is a 1990 action role-playing platform video game developed and published by Taito for arcades. It was then ported to the TurboGrafx-16 in 1991 and the Sega Genesis in 1992. It is included in Taito Memories Volume 2 released for the PlayStation 2 in 2005 and the Xbox and Microsoft Windows versions of Taito Legends 2 released in 2007. Hamster Corporation released the arcade version as part of their Arcade Archives series for the Nintendo Switch and PlayStation 4 on August 31, 2023.

== Plot ==
The game's setting is a medieval fantasy world similar to that of sword-and-sorcery high fantasy such as The Lord of the Rings. The demons and abominations of nature who reside in the underground kingdom of Cadash have not forgotten that, thousands of years previously, they once shared the light with humans. Then one rose among them who was especially powerful, a demonic wizard born of a human woman – the Balrog (Baarogue or Baalogue in the arcade version, and Balrog in the TurboGrafx-16 version). The Balrog promised his followers they could, in time, emerge from their subterranean prison and rule the world of men, taking revenge on humans for their prior defeat in battle and subsequent exile, if the Balrog could mingle his blood with that of a human king. The Balrog and his demonic armies gathered in force over the centuries, and are now powerful enough to emerge to the surface and make war with the unprepared human kingdoms which had not known war for millennia, all of which quickly fall to the Balrog. The human world is almost entirely laid to waste by the Balrog. However, this was not enough for the Balrog, whose prize is the mightiest of all human kingdoms, the Kingdom of Dirzir. One night, the beautiful Princess Salassa is kidnapped by the Balrog from the Keep of Deerzar, the capital city of Dirzir, and taken underground to the dreaded Castle Cadash. There the Balrog plans to initiate the ritual which would magically bind himself to the human princess, becoming all-powerful and invincible. Dilsarl, the distraught and helpless elderly King of Dirzir, has vowed to give his entire kingdom to the one who would rescue his beloved only daughter, and many brave heroes have disappeared into the depths of Cadash on this quest.

== Gameplay ==
Screenshot from arcade version

Cadash is an early example of what would become a fairly common trend in Japanese-made arcade games of the early 1990s: the "platform-RPG", combining side-scrolling platform action with an RPG system of statistics, levels, money and magic.

Four characters can play at once in the arcade version, and up to two players may select from four different characters in the console versions: fighter, mage, priestess, and ninja, each with different attacks, statistics and skills. Players then proceed through each level, killing monsters and bosses, collecting keys to unlock doors and collecting gold and experience. Gold is also taken from slain foes and treasure chests. Villages sell items, weapons, armor and (in the console versions) extra lives, with each village encountered providing better equipment. Some villagers and benevolent creatures will also provide information. The arcade version has a limited game time, which can be extended by buying progressively more expensive hourglasses at shops, or by picking up rare bonuses. In shops, and in hidden places, are medicinal herbs which restore 10 HP if brought to zero, and antidotes which cure poison inflicted by specific foes. There are also two elixirs in the game that act like medicinal herbs, except that they restore all HP.

There are five stages in the game. Stages one, two and four consist of two worlds, above and below ground. Stage three consists of three worlds. Stage five is set entirely within Castle Cadash. The environments differ significantly, from pleasant meadows to caves, and from forests to underwater environments. Some foes encountered in these levels are derived from common mythology while others are completely made up for the game.

In both the arcade and the TurboGrafx-16 versions, there are four playable characters. However, the Sega Genesis version only has the fighter and mage as playable characters, as the priestess and ninja characters are missing. In all versions of the game the characters vary significantly in terms of power and abilities.

The arcade version supports a four-players "link" mode using two Cadash cabinets, with some limitations, such as each player having to pick a different character, and characters playing on the same machine being forced to keep up with each other, unable to venture "off screen". Two-player mode is available in the console versions. The characters are:

- Fighter: identified as "Toru" in some game manuals, the otherwise unnamed fighter is a Conan the Barbarian-style warrior who lives by his muscle and his sword. The fighter has powerful melee attacks, the highest defense and the highest agility in the game when using a particular weapon. However, compared to the other characters, he is unable to use any magic spells. Being a close range fighter, he is initially disadvantaged against ranged attacks and flying enemies due to the short reach of his weapons. To combat ranged attacks, the fighter can purchase and wield a shield to block most enemy projectiles, including dragons' fire. The fighter's quick movement and attack speed, especially with his end game weapons, allows him to make short work of most enemies and bosses once he closes the distance.
- Mage: the silver-haired, bearded and green-robed, unnamed mage, with a slightly hunched back, is the court wizard of Dirzir and chief advisor to the king. The mage draws on the wisdom and magic of the ancients who were able to banish the demons to Cadash in the distant past, and can also rely on his magic staff when his magic reserves need to replenish themselves. He has the most powerful offensive capability in the game through his spells, but is also physically the weakest and slowest character. Among all the characters, the mage requires the lowest amount of experience to gain levels, being able to reach the maximum level as early as the halfway point of the game. As the mage gains levels he learns new and more powerful spells, calling upon the elements and the very forces of nature to assist him; after obtaining the Wizard Staff, he is able recover 1 mana point per second and cast spells at half the original mana cost. However, his spells do not work on certain creatures, including the undead, forcing him to evade them or fight with his limited melee capability. The mage's devastating spells allow him to be a powerful boss killer; he is the only character who is able to take down the final boss easy and fast.
- Priestess: the young warrior-priestess is the most appropriate character for beginners, who have yet to learn the game's differences and enemy arrangement, thanks to her defensive spells which allow her to heal and negate damage. Offensively, she is competent against normal enemies due to the long reach and penetration of her final weapon. However, her weapons are the slowest among all the characters in both attack and recovery, making her the weakest boss killer in the game. Defensively, she is able to cast a highly useful protection spell that absorbs 32 damage and removes the knockback from getting hit. The priestess also has the ability to add more playing time in the arcade version of Cadash (30 seconds in the Japanese version, and 60 seconds in all other versions). In the Japanese version of Cadash, the priestess is a much less effective character overall: she is the least suitable character to bypass the second level and fight stone golems for lucrative experience (which is a well-known and critical strategy when playing optimally) since she cannot compensate for her weakness at that point in the game with the much cheaper medicinal herbs sold in the overseas versions, and she cannot exploit staying at inns to increase the playing time due to the exorbitant inn prices in the Japanese version.
- Ninja: the mysterious ninja is a master of ranged combat who has excellent agility, the highest natural defense, and exclusively uses concealed projectiles (shurikens and throwing knives) to attack with. He is the only true long range character in the game, being able to kill enemies as soon as they appear on screen. The priestess eventually gains a weapon that travels a long distance, but the ninja outclasses her in terms of attack recovery, projectile speed, and raw damage. The ninja's attack takes the fewest frames to come out compared to the other characters; he is unparalleled when it comes to taking down normal enemies, and is also a very efficient boss killer. When wielding certain weapons, he has some special abilities such as spreading fire and being able to penetrate enemies and walls with projectiles. The ninja's sole disadvantage is that he has the highest experience requirements to gain levels, and so it may take longer to progress the character, but this is largely overcome by the fact that he gains the most status points per level and his ability to dispose of enemies, and hence gain experience, is the quickest among the four characters.

== Ports ==
In the early 1990s, Cadash was ported to the TurboGrafx-16 (in 1991) and the Sega Genesis (1992). Both home console versions of Cadash eliminated the time limit that existed in the original arcade version.

The TurboGrafx-16 (PC Engine) version of Cadash, which was translated into English by Working Designs, implemented many changes to the original game, including agility, defense, spell costs and damage, to better balance the characters. Formerly challenging characters such as the fighter and mage were greatly enhanced to rival and even surpass the priestess. To accommodate the differences in hardware power, the levels were divided into large rooms and halls connected by doors and corridors, whereas the arcade game used large, seamless levels. The PC Engine version features colorful, new designs and graphics that are a sharp contrast from the darker shades used in the arcade and Genesis versions. The PC Engine version does not allow any continuing in one-player mode, although dead allies could be revived at inns in two-player mode.

The Genesis port excluded two of the four playable classes, keeping only the fighter and mage. The port was not entirely accurate although the graphics were similar, albeit with a much darker palette. The giant kelp boss was removed entirely from this version. The healing value of herbs, damage from enemies, enemy AI and many more aspects of the game were altered. This is the only version of Cadash where the player can buy elixirs, which serve as extra lives, in item shops.

The Japanese and US versions of the original arcade game are much more difficult than the other versions. The most noticeable changes are that the player can only carry half as many herbs and antidotes, and herbs are considerably more expensive to buy. The price of sleeping at an inn increases from 50 to 200 to 1,000 to 6,000 to 30,000 gold with each subsequent stay, while in the overseas versions the maximum price for staying at an inn remains at 5,000 gold. The hidden Dragon Amulet only rewards 10,000 gold, as opposed to the maximum amount of 65,535 in the other versions. As for differences in character gameplay, the priestess's Recover Time spell adds only 30 seconds to the game's timer, as opposed to a full minute in the other versions. Finally, bosses have much more health in the Japanese and US versions of Cadash, which is easily apparent by comparing the number of attacks (such as the Mage's Explosion spell) required to defeat the bosses.

== Reception ==
Reception

Review score
Publication	Score
Famitsu	6/10, 6/10, 7/10, 4/10 (PC-E)

In Japan, Game Machine listed Cadash on their May 1, 1990 issue as being the most-successful table arcade unit of the month. It was released for the PC-Engine on January 18, 1991.

In North America, the arcade game was critically well received by RePlay magazine in early 1990.
