= Warrior Blade =

1991 video game

- Developer: Taito
- Publisher: Taito
- Platform: Arcade
- Release: JP: May 1992
- Genre: Beat 'em up
- Modes: Single-player, multiplayer

Warrior Blade is a 1992 beat 'em up video game developed and published by Taito for arcades. It was only released in Japan in May 1992. The sequel to Rastan Saga II, it eschews the series' platformer gameplay for a beat 'em up similar to Golden Axe. Its main feature is the use of dual screens to depict the action.

The game was later re-released as part of the Japanese-only Taito Memories II Gekan (2007) and Taito Milestones 3 (2024) for the PlayStation 2 and Nintendo Switch, respectively. Hamster Corporation released the game as part of their Arcade Archives series for the Nintendo Switch and PlayStation 4 in December 2024.

== Gameplay ==
Similar to Golden Axe, Warrior Blade is a side-scrolling beat 'em up. There are three characters to select: a warrior named Rastan, a hireling named Dewey, and a thief named Sophia.

== Reception ==
In Japan, Game Machine listed Warrior Blade: Rastan Saga Episode III on their July 1, 1992 issue as being the eleventh most-successful upright/cockpit arcade unit of the month.
