= Insector X =

1989 video game

- North American cover art (Sega Genesis version)
- Developer: Hot-B
- Publishers: WW: Taito; JP: Hot-B (MD); JP: Taito (Famicom); NA: Sage's Creation (Genesis)
- Platforms: Arcade, Mega Drive, Famicom
- Release: Arcade: JP: August 1989; NA: 1989; Mega Drive: JP: September 7, 1990; NA: October 1990; Famicom: JP: September 20, 1990
- Genre: Scrolling shooter
- Mode: Single-player

Insector X (インセクターX, Insekuta X) is a horizontally scrolling shooter developed by Hot-B and released in arcades by Taito in 1989. It was ported to the Mega Drive and Famicom.

== Gameplay ==
The player controls an insect-sized warrior named "Kai" (named "Yanmer" in the arcade version), who takes on a vast army of cyborg insects to free the insect world from the dark ruler queen. The game uses two buttons: one for an upgradable main shot, and another for a seemingly random selection of secondary weapons.

== Release ==
Arcade version (left) and Mega Drive version

Hot-B converted Insector-X to the Famicom for Taito with minor changes, as well as their own revised version for the Sega Mega Drive. The original arcade version is included in Taito Legends 2.

The Mega Drive version has a number of differences: "realistic" sprite work (compared to the "cute" style of the original), brand new music, a reworking of the secondary weapon system, the removal of the autofire powerup, and new stage sections, among other things. Hot-B's original design for the game was better realized on the Mega Drive, as Taito requested a more comical style of game for the original release. It was published in Japan by Hot-B themselves, and in North America by Sage's Creation.

== Reception ==
Reception

Review scores
Publication	Score
AllGame	3/5 (SMD)
Console XS	94% (SMD)
Megatech	74% (SMD)
Raze	80%

In Japan, Game Machine listed Insector X on their October 15, 1989 issue as being the twenty-fourth most-successful table arcade unit of the month. Console XS gave an overall score of 94%, praising the graphics and sound and called the game a superb shoot-'em-up. MegaTech gave an overall review score of 74%, commending its graphics and sound, but they felt that the game's action offers very little in original features and said there are better shoot-em-ups then Insector X. Raze magazine gave a score of 80%, praising the detailed backgrounds and the well animated and intricately drawn characters, and also commended the game's music and sound effects.
