= Volfied =

1989 video game

- Arcade flyer
- Developer: Taito
- Publisher: Taito
- Designer: Fukio Mitsuji
- Platforms: Arcade, Atari ST, Amiga, Genesis, PC Engine, MS-DOS, Commodore 64
- Release: JP: July 1989
- Genre: Action
- Modes: Single-player, multiplayer

Volfied (Note: Japanese: ヴォルフィード, Hepburn: Vorufīdo) is a 1989 puzzle video game developed and published by Taito for arcades. It was released only in Japan in July 1989. It is a successor to Qix, with extra features and a futuristic science fiction aesthetic, rather than Qix's abstract geometry style; the player pilots a small spaceship named "Monotros" instead of a marker, and the enemies come in the form of various aliens.

== Plot ==
Taking place in another galaxy, a space pilot is returning to his home world of Volfied, only to discover that it is under attack by an unknown alien force. The few remaining Volfied inhabitants are in an underground location of the planet and signal the pilot to their aid. The pilot flies to Volfied using his ship's defensive weapons in order to eliminate the alien threat and save his people.

== Gameplay ==
The overall gameplay is mostly identical to that of Qix, but the main enemy is no longer a collection of lines - instead it varies between levels, and is always accompanied by smaller enemies. When the player's spaceship succeeds in claiming a section of the level, the side containing the main enemy is taken as "the outside". Any smaller enemies ending up on "the inside" are killed, resulting in point bonuses. In order to complete a level, the player must claim at least 80% of a level's area, split the field in between both main enemies if there are two main enemies, or defeat the main enemy with a weapon that can be obtained as a power-up. Previously, the limits were 75% in Qix and 70% in Super Qix. Each level in Volfied has a unique background and enemies. As the player claims areas of the level the cleared area graphic is replaced with the graphic of the next level. Grey boxes also appear on the field — these give the player a power-up when collected. Power-ups can grant the player speed or even weapons. There is a special completion bonus on certain levels, often attained by shooting the main enemy.

== Ports ==
I.T.L developed and Taito published a PC Engine version in 1989. This port was only released in Japan. A Sega Genesis conversion was developed by I.T.L and published by Taito in 1991. This port was released in North America as Ultimate Qix. Empire Interactive developed ports for Amiga, Atari ST, and MS-DOS. A port for FM Towns from Ving was released in 1991 only in Japan. It is playable on FM Towns Marty. A port for the PlayStation was developed and released in 2001 as part of the Simple series. This port was released in North America as Qix Neo. A compilation containing Volfied, Taito Legends, was released by Taito in 2005 for the PlayStation 2, Xbox, and Windows. A Java-based mobile phone version of the game was released in Europe by Taito in 2007.

The arcade version was released outside Japan for the first time by Hamster Corporation as part of their Arcade Archives series for the Nintendo Switch and PlayStation 4 in March 2024.

== Reception ==
In Japan, Game Machine listed Volfied on their September 15, 1989 issue as being the ninth most successful table arcade unit of the month.
