= Crazy Balloon =

1980 video game

- Arcade flyer
- Developer: Taito
- Publisher: Taito
- Platform: Arcade
- Release: JP: March 1980; EU: 1980
- Genre: Maze
- Modes: Single-player, multiplayer

Crazy Balloon (Note: Japanese: クレイジーバルーン, Hepburn: Kureijī Barūn) is a 1980 maze video game developed and published by Taito for arcades. It was released in Japan in March 1980 and Europe the same year.

== Gameplay ==
The player controls a box tied to a floating balloon, which swings left and right continually, within a maze filled with spikes. Any contact with the spikes, either with the balloon or the box, destroys the balloon. Using a four-way joystick, the player moves the box through the maze and toward the goal, ensuring that the swinging balloon avoids the spikes.

The player collects points as the box moves closer to the goal (backtracking earns no points). Certain areas of the maze are colored green and purple, and the player will earn more points if the balloon and box pass through the area safely. While there is no time limit, the player cannot wait for a long time; otherwise, a face will appear and blow the balloon into the spikes.

As the player completes mazes, individual spikes, or even the entire maze, may begin moving or scrolling.

== Legacy ==
The original arcade version is included in emulated compilations such as Taito Legends 2 (PlayStation 2, Xbox and Microsoft Windows) and Taito Legends Power-Up (PlayStation Portable) in 2006. An updated version of the game, named Crazy Balloon 2005, was included alongside the original arcade release on Taito Legends Power-Up.

Hamster Corporation released the game as part of their Arcade Archives series for the Nintendo Switch and PlayStation 4 in June 2025, as well as the Arcade Archives 2 series for Microsoft Windows, Nintendo Switch 2, PlayStation 5, and Xbox Series X/S in October 2026.

There are also a few clones without any involvement from Taito, including Crazy Balloon for the Commodore 64 (Software Projects, 1983) and Crazy Balloons for the ZX Spectrum (A&F Software, 1983). A version for the BBC Micro was developed by Acornsoft but was never released.
