= Plump Pop =

1987 video game

- Developer: Taito
- Publisher: Taito
- Platform: Arcade
- Release: JP: 1987
- Genre: Block breaker
- Modes: Single-player, multiplayer

Plump Pop (Note: Japanese: プランプポップ, Hepburn: Puranpu Poppu) is a 1987 block breaker video game developed and published by Taito for arcades. Its gameplay is similar to Exidy's Circus (1977), which Taito published in Japan.

Taito included the game in their Taito Memories compilation for the PlayStation 2. Hamster Corporation released the game as part of their Arcade Archives series for the Nintendo Switch and PlayStation 4, as well as their Arcade Archives 2 series for the Nintendo Switch 2, PlayStation 5 and Xbox Series X/S in March 2026.

== Gameplay ==
The player controls a family of dogs, cats or pigs who launch their child into the sky in order to defeat floating objects or enemies. The parents can move to catch the child with a trampoline and give them a speed boost by pressing the jump button. The children can land and walk safely on clouds. When multiple children are involved, failing to catch one would instantly use up a life even if the other children are unscathed. Catching fruit grants extra points. Boss characters occasionally appear and need to be defeated. Levels end when all enemies are defeated, though the game ends when all lives are used up.
