= Spy Games: Elevator Mission =

2007 video game

- Developers: Dreams Co., Ltd.
- Publisher: UFO Interactive Games
- Platform: Wii
- Release: NA: November 16, 2007
- Genre: Shoot 'em up
- Mode: Single-player

Spy Games: Elevator Mission is a first person shooter developed by Japanese studio Dreams Co. Ltd., where the player tries to go through a 50-story building. Along the way, the player must recover 5 hidden data disks in each level. Dreams were originally developing the game to be a part of the Elevator Action series but lost the license after Square Enix acquired Taito in 2005 causing them to scale the project down into a generic title.

== Reception ==
Reception

Review scores
| Publication | Score |
|---|---|
| GameSpot | 2/10 |
| IGN | 2.5/10 |

IGN editor Lucas M. Thomas rated it 2.5 (terrible), citing it as having has poor controls, repetitive, bad visuals and sounds, and 'plays out like an N64 shooter that you shouldn't have had to pay for at all.'
