= Growl (video game) =

1991 video game

- U.S. arcade flyer
- Developers: Taito; I.T.L Co., Ltd. (Genesis)
- Publisher: Taito
- Director: Hidehiro Fujiwara
- Producer: Hidehiro Fujiwara
- Programmers: Yasuhiko Kikuchi; Kozo Igarashi; Hidehiro Fujiwara; Takatsuna Senba; Hisakazu Kato; Hisaya Yabusaki
- Artists: Toru Sugawara; Masaki Yagi; Daisuke Yasukouchi; Hiroyuki Tanaka; Yuichi Kohyama
- Composer: Yasuhisa Watanabe
- Platforms: Arcade, Genesis/Mega Drive
- Release: Arcade: JP/NA: February 1991; Mega Drive/Genesis: JP: November 15, 1991; NA: 1991
- Genre: Beat 'em up
- Modes: Single-player, multiplayer
- Arcade system: Taito F2 System Hardware

Growl, released in Japan as Runark (Note: Japanese: ルナーク, Hepburn: Runāku), is a 1991 beat 'em up video game developed and published by Taito for arcades. It was released in Japan and North America in February 1991. Set in the early 20th century, the player controls a forest ranger who must protect the local wildlife from a group of evil poachers who are driving the animals to extinction. A home version was released for the Sega Genesis (Mega Drive) in November 1991. A censored version was also included in the arcade game compilation Taito Legends 2 for the PlayStation 2, Xbox, and Microsoft Windows. Hamster Corporation released the game as part of their Arcade Archives series for the Nintendo Switch and PlayStation 4 in July 2023.

== Gameplay ==
The first stage in the arcade version

The player begins the game by choosing from one of four different forest rangers, each with a different amount of health, attack strength, and jumping height. There are four variations of the game (which can be determined by dipswitch settings):

- A common two-player setting (used in most two-player cabinets).
- A four-player setting with individual coin slots for each player (usually seen in most conversions of four-player cabinets such as Crime Fighters, Gauntlet, and Quartet).
- A four-player setting which uses a pair of two player cabinets linked together with a special cable.
- A four-player setting which uses two coin slots for everyone (usually seen in conversions of Trog among other four player cabinets which use two coin slots).

The two-player variant allows the player to choose which character they would like to play as while the four-player versions assign each character to a player slot like other beat 'em ups.

The game is controlled with an eight-way joystick for moving the character and two action buttons (attack and jump). The player can perform a variety of different attacks (punches, kicks, and finishing blows) depending on the position of an enemy. By pressing both buttons while surrounded by enemies, the player can perform a special attack that strikes every nearby enemy. By pressing both buttons while holding the joystick upwards, the player will perform a longer jump.

The player can procure weapons by destroying barrels and wooden crates or disarming certain enemies. There are a total of eight weapons which can be obtained: three melee weapons (a pipe, a sword and a whip), two throwing weapons (knives and hand grenades), and three firearms (a revolver, an M-16 assault rifle, and a four-barreled FLASH-style rocket launcher). The barrels and crates can be picked up and thrown at enemies as well. When the assault rifle or rocket launcher runs out of ammunition, they are still wielded by the player as melee weapons. The revolver, on the other hand, is thrown by the player after all of its bullets are used. The player can drop their current weapon by pressing down and attack while wielding it. If a weapon lies on the ground after a certain period, it will vanish completely.

There are seven regular stages (called rounds) and a bonus game, for a total of eight stages. The locations include a city, a moving train, a boat, a jungle, a cavern, and the hideout of the poachers. There are six types of enemy characters throughout the game, excluding the final boss (who has two forms). There are also animal helpers that will help out the player after they are rescued from a poacher, such as an eagle, a herd of deer, and an elephant.

== Ports ==
=== Genesis ===
The Genesis port of Growl can only be played by a single player, although all four characters are present and are given individual names (Gen, Burn, Khan, and Jack). The controls are identical to the arcade version. The player's special attacks can now be performed at any time, but now they drain a bit of the player's health. Instead of recovering health between stages, the player recovers his health by picking up apples hidden inside certain crates. The cavern stage was also redesigned completely. Also, the M-16 has been replaced with an AK-47.

== Reception ==
Reception

Review score
Publication	Score
Famicom Tsūshin	4/10, 6/10, 6/10, 4/10 (SMD)

In Japan, Game Machine listed Growl on their March 15, 1991 issue as being the second most-successful table arcade unit of the month.
