= Elevator Action EX =

2000 video game

- Developers: Altron; Taito
- Publishers: JP: Altron; EU: TDK Mediactive Europe
- Platform: Game Boy Color
- Release: JP: 29 September 2000; UK: 6 April 2001
- Genres: Platform, shooter
- Mode: Single-player

Elevator Action EX is an update to the Game Boy version of Elevator Action published by Altron in 2000. In addition to colour, players can choose between three characters: Mike, an all rounded character, Guy, a slower yet more durable character, and Sarah, a faster yet weaker character.

This game was redesigned and published by BAM! Entertainment as Dexter's Laboratory: Robot Rampage in the US, which uses Dexter's Laboratory characters.

== Gameplay ==
The game contains four stages with four buildings each. At the end of 4th building in each stage, player fights against a series of enemies appearing from the doors inside a narrow tunnel, except for stage 4, where player fights against boss in a multi-level suite.

After completing the game, a password is given, which allows player to use the boss character (D.D.Fox) in the game. When playing as D.D.Fox, the final boss is Mike.
