= The Ninja Kids =

1991 video game

- Arcade flyer
- Developer: Taito
- Publisher: Taito
- Platform: Arcade
- Release: NA: March 1991; JP: April 1991
- Genre: Beat 'em up
- Modes: Single-player, multiplayer

The Ninja Kids (Note: Japanese: ニンジャキッズ, Hepburn: Ninja Kizzu) is a 1991 beat 'em up video game developed and published by Taito for arcades. It was released in North America in March 1991 and in Japan in April 1991. It is notable for its marionette-inspired art style. It was released in the Taito Legends compilation. Hamster Corporation released the game as part of their Arcade Archives series for the Nintendo Switch and PlayStation 4 in August 2024.

== Gameplay ==
The player controls four ninja children who are tasked to defeat a satanic cult which invaded their hometown. The game is a side-scrolling beat 'em up where the player character defeats enemies by slashing them with their weapon of choice (depending on the character). One level has a climbing segment. The player can jump to avoid attacks and attack airborne enemies. Environmental obstacles can be broken to reveal items such as recovery items, items that grant bonus points and scrolls thats allow the player to use a select type of ninjutsu for a limited time. Levels end after the player beats all boss characters.
