= Bonze Adventure =

1988 video game

- Arcade flyer
- Developer: Taito
- Publisher: Taito
- Platforms: Arcade, PC Engine
- Release: Arcade: JP: June 1988; PC Engine: JP: August 3, 1990
- Genre: Platform
- Modes: Single-player, multiplayer

Bonze Adventure, released in Japan as Jigoku Meguri (Note: Japanese: 地獄めぐり, Hepburn: Jigoku Meguri; lit. "Hell Tour"), is a 1988 platform video game developed and published by Taito for arcades. It was released only in Japan in June 1988. A PC Engine port was published in 1990.

== Plot ==
Emma the King has lost his senses, causing him to lose order of his Underworld domain – enabling evil entities to roam freely. The player controls Bonze Kackremboh, a Buddhist priest who is son of the Divine Dragon. Kackremboh must now go on a journey to find and confront Emma. In order to find Emma, Bonze must survive against hordes of yokai, such as snakes, giant eyeballs, ghosts, kitsune, spiders, entities appearing to be hitodama/will-o'-the-wisp, as well as other evils.

== Gameplay ==
The priest's weapons are Buddhist prayer beads, called "mala" beads, which can be powered up until they become almost as large as the priest himself. In times of difficulty, a deva often provides various power-ups to assist the priest's progress. The allotted time appears in the manner of melting candles, rather than a traditional timer.

== Reception ==
Reception

Review score
Publication	Score
Famitsu	23/40 (PE)

In Japan, Game Machine listed Bonze Adventure on their July 15, 1988 issue as being the third most-successful table arcade unit of the month.

Bonze Adventure was released for the PC Engine in Japan on August 3, 1990.

The PC Engine version was released for the Wii's Virtual Console in 2008. Taito released the game outside Japan for the first time as part of their Taito Legends 2 collection. Hamster Corporation released the game as part of their Arcade Archives series for the Nintendo Switch and PlayStation 4 in March 2023.
