= Raimais =

1988 video game

- Developer: Taito
- Publisher: Taito
- Designer: Akira Fujita
- Platforms: Arcade, Famicom Disk System
- Release: JP: April 1988
- Genre: Maze
- Modes: Single-player, multiplayer
- Arcade system: Taito L System

Raimais (Note: Japanese: レイメイズ, Hepburn: Reimeizu) is a 1988 maze video game developed and published by Taito for arcades. It was released only in Japan in April 1988. It was designed by Akira Fujita, who previously designed Arkanoid for Taito. The game was ported to the Famicom Disk System under the title Youmais the same year.

It was included as part of the compilation Taito Legends 2 in 2006, marking its first official release in the west. Hamster Corporation released the game as part of their Arcade Archives series for the Nintendo Switch and PlayStation 4 in November 2021.

== Gameplay ==
The player controls Rika Midorikawa, who navigates a labyrinth in order to collect dots in a similar manner to Pac-Man while avoiding alien enemies to save her brother. The alien enemies cannot be defeated and the vehicle must avoid collusions with them while collecting dots and items that grant extra points. Various obstacles stop the vehicle from passing by. After collecting all dots in a level, the vehicle can escape through numerous openings in the walls. Different openings lead to different areas and items to collect due to its labyrinthian design, leading to numerous possible endings.

== Reception ==
In Japan, Game Machine listed Raimais on their June 15, 1988 issue as being the eleventh most-successful table arcade unit of the month.
