= Alpine Ski =

1981 video game

- European arcade flyer
- Developer: Taito
- Publisher: Taito
- Platform: Arcade
- Release: JP: December 1981; NA: 1982
- Genre: Sports (skiing)
- Modes: Single-player, multiplayer
- Arcade system: Taito SJ System

Alpine Ski (Note: Japanese: アルパイン・スキ一, Hepburn: Arupain Sukiichi) is a skiing video game developed and published by Taito for arcades. It was released in Japan in December 1981 and internationally in 1982.

Alpine Ski was re-released for the first time through the Taito Legends 2 compilation. Hamster Corporation released the game as part of their Arcade Archives series for the Nintendo Switch and PlayStation 4 in 2019.

Arcade screenshot

== Gameplay ==
The player controls a skier on a vertically scrolling course who can move left, right, or increase forward speed. The aim is to maneuver a skier through a downhill course, a slalom, and a ski jumping competition in the shortest time possible. Two players can compete against each other.
