= Master of Weapon =

1989 video game

- Mega Drive cover art
- Developers: Taito; KID (Sega Mega Drive)
- Publishers: Taito; Profit-Vend (US)
- Director: Kyouji Shimamoto
- Producer: Kyouji Shimamoto
- Designer: Yukiwo Ishikawa
- Programmers: Kyouji Shimamoto; Takeshi Murata; Tetsushi Abe
- Artists: Yukiwo Ishikawa; Takako Kojima; Junji Yarita
- Composers: Hisayoshi Ogura; Yasuhisa Watanabe
- Platforms: Arcade, Mega Drive
- Release: Arcade: JP: May 1989; WW: 1989; Mega Drive: JP: September 27, 1991
- Genre: Scrolling shooter
- Modes: Single-player, multiplayer
- Arcade system: Taito B System

Master of Weapon (Note: Japanese: マスターオブウェポン, Hepburn: Masutā Obu Ūepon) is a 1989 vertically scrolling shooter video game developed and published by Taito for arcades. It was released in Japan in May 1989. A port to the Sega Mega Drive was released in 1991 exclusively in Japan.

Hamster Corporation released the game as part of their Arcade Archives series for the Nintendo Switch and PlayStation 4 in February 2024.

== Plot ==
An entire week of nuclear war on Earth destroys its global environment. The survivors of the war gather their strength and resources in an attempt to bring Earth back to the way it was. Using a supercomputer called God System, the survivors start their first step in rebuilding Earth by having the God System create machines capable cleaning and reconstructing much of what has been lost from the war. However, without warning, a mysterious mutant entity known as "N" takes over the God System; creating three strange guardian statues based on Greek mythological figures, N manipulates the God System's machines and programs in order to attack mankind. The survivors create an artificial human called Yukiwo – built to harness perfect dexterity and strength – as well as a super-powered jet for him to pilot in order to reclaim Earth from N.

== Gameplay ==
The spaceship starts with a basic photon cannon and air-to-ground bombs. Both of these weapons can fire continuously without a need for pause. The photon cannon can be upgraded five times for up to five streams of photons by collecting P upgrades. Additionally, the exhaust of the ship can be used as a weapon.

Special weapons can be collected by picking up boxes with specific labels through destroying transport vessels. These then upgrade the weaponry of the ship.

- P (Piercing) – Essentially the same as the conventional air-to-ground bomb. This is the default special weapon.
- L (Laser) – Very powerful but has a short range. It can attack both air and ground targets.
- G (Guide) – Shoots several green projectiles that track all targets on screen, self-destruct, and destroy the target.
- W (Wide) – A somewhat powerful launch of several projectiles in a star pattern
- H (H-Bomb) – Destroys all enemies on the screen for a few seconds. Can only be used once.
- S – Increases the exhaust of the ship, allows it to damage enemies at a further range and increases movement speed of the ship.

== Reception ==
Game Machine listed Master of Weapon as being among the most popular arcade games in Japan of June 1989.
