= Balloon Bomber =

1980 video game

- Arcade flyer
- Developer: Taito
- Publisher: Taito
- Designer: Tomohiro Nishikado
- Composer: Yoshio Imamura
- Platform: Arcade
- Release: JP: March 1980
- Genre: Fixed shooter
- Modes: Single player, multiplayer

Balloon Bomber (Note: Japanese: バルーンボンバー, Hepburn: Barūn Bonbā) is a 1980 fixed shooter video game developed and published by Taito for arcades. It was released in Japan in March 1980.

== Gameplay ==
Balloon Bomber is a fixed shooter game which the player controls a ship at the bottom of the screen which shoots at balloon-carrying bombs overhead. If a falling bomb hits the bottom of the screen, it makes a crater which cannot be moved past limiting mobility. To pass a level, the player had to defeat all of the craters and balloons being released by an airplanes.

== Legacy ==
The game was re-released in multiple compilations, including Taito Legends 2 for PlayStation 2, Taito Memories Pocket (Japan/Asia), and Taito Legends Power Up (Europe) for the PlayStation Portable. Hamster Corporation released the game as part of their Arcade Archives series for the Nintendo Switch and PlayStation 4, as well as their Arcade Archives 2 series for the Nintendo Switch 2, PlayStation 5 and Xbox Series X/S in September 2026.
