= Cameltry =

1990 video game

- Arcade flyer
- Developer: Taito
- Publisher: Taito
- Platforms: Arcade, Super Nintendo Entertainment System, FM Towns, X68000
- Release: JP: April 1990
- Genre: Maze
- Modes: Single-player, multiplayer

Cameltry (Note: Japanese: キャメルトライ, Hepburn: Kyamerutorai) is a 1990 maze video game developed and published by Taito for arcades. It was released in Japan in April 1990. It was ported to the FM Towns, Super Nintendo Entertainment System, and X68000. The Super NES version was published in North America and Europe as On the Ball.

== Gameplay ==
Training course

In Cameltry, the player moves a ball through a maze by rotating the maze itself around the ball in other to reach the finish line and advance to the next level. They must compete against the clock and navigate obstacles from breakable bricks to bumpers. If the timer runs out, the game is over, unless players may wish to continue playing by inserting another coin into the machine any time.

== Release ==
The game runs on Taito's F1 system hardware and uses the same optical rotary system from in Taito's 1986 arcade game Arkanoid. It was ported in 1992 to the Super NES, and in 1993 to the FM Towns computer. The Super NES release was titled On the Ball in North America and Europe, and was compatible with the Super NES Mouse.

== Reception ==
In Japan, Game Machine listed Cameltry on their May 15, 1990 issue as being the eleventh most-successful table arcade unit of the month.

== Legacy ==
In 2005, Taito released an updated version for the Nintendo DS in Japan called Mawashite Koron, which made its way to North America and Europe in 2007 under the name Labyrinth. A version of the game is also available for the PlayStation 2, Xbox and Microsoft Windows, as part of the Taito Legends 2 collection, and for the PlayStation Portable, as part of the Taito Legends Power-Up collection with the remake version was included in the latter. Another updated version was released for iOS in 2009 and Zune HD in 2010.

In March 2020, the game has been included as part of the Antstream Arcade cloud gaming service. On March 26, 2026, the arcade version of the game was released as part of the Taito Milestones 4 collection for the Nintendo Switch. Hamster Corporation released the game as part of their Arcade Archives series for the Nintendo Switch and PlayStation 4, as well as their Arcade Archives 2 series for the Nintendo Switch 2, PlayStation 5 and Xbox Series X/S in June 2026.
