= Battle Shark =

1989 video game

- Arcade title screen
- Developer: Taito
- Publisher: Taito
- Directors: Yoshio Imamura; Ichiro Fujisue
- Designer: Atsushi Yamamoto
- Programmers: Ichiro Fujisue; Hideki Hashimoto; Takashi Kitabayashi; Naoya Kuroki; Takayuki Ishiwata
- Artists: Hisakazu Kato; Takayuki Ogawa; Tsuyoshi Sato; Kenichi Imaeda
- Composer: Yasuko Yamada
- Platform: Arcade
- Release: JP: July 19, 1989; NA: March 1990; EU: October 1990
- Genre: Shooter
- Mode: Single-player
- Arcade system: Taito Z System

Battle Shark (バトルシャーク) is a first-person shoot 'em up released as an arcade video game by Taito in 1989. The player looks through a submarine periscope to destroy enemies while avoiding torpedoes and missiles.

The player starts with a limited amount of torpedoes, which slowly replenishes itself. Power-up targets appear throughout the games, which can increase the supply of torpedoes, repair damage, or add extra firepower. At the end of each stage, the player faces off against a boss character.

The Amusement & Music Operators Association (AMOA) nominated Battle Shark for the "Most Inventive" award in 1990. The game was released for Taito Legends in 2005.

== Plot ==
The story in Battle Shark involves a third world war (World War 3 or WWIII). According to the description in the game's attract mode introduction, "extremely brutal fighting has been taking place on land, and now the battlefield is expanding into the oceans."

Peace negotiations, the fictional allies then discover, are an enemy trap, and that the enemy has actually been buying time to create an underwater fortress at the bottom of the sea.

Battle Shark, with its driver, a navy soldier, must fight its way through hordes of enemy submarines, boats, and vehicles to track down the fortress, and ultimately destroy it.

== Reception ==
In Japan, Game Machine listed Battle Shark on their May 1, 1990 issue as being the sixth most-successful upright arcade unit of the month.

The game was well-received by critics. RePlay gave it a positive review upon its North American debut at Chicago's American Coin Machine Exposition (ACME) in March 1990. Your Sinclair reviewed the arcade game in 1990, giving it an 87% score.

At the 1990 AMOA Games Awards held by the Amusement & Music Operators Association (AMOA), Battle Shark was nominated for the "Most Inventive" award.
