= Rastan Saga II =

1989 video game

- Japanese arcade flyer
- Developers: Taito; Opera House (Genesis)
- Publisher: Taito
- Platforms: Arcade, PC Engine, Mega Drive/Genesis
- Release: Arcade: JP: March 1989; NA: June 1989; EU: 1989; PC Engine: JP: July 6, 1990; Mega Drive/Genesis: JP: August 10, 1990; NA: 1991
- Genres: Hack and slash, platform
- Modes: Single-player, multiplayer
- Arcade system: Taito B System

Rastan Saga II (Note: Japanese: ラスタンサーガ2, Hepburn: Rasutan Sāga Tsu), released in Europe as Nastar and in North America as Nastar Warrior, is a 1989 hack and slash platform video game developed and published by Taito for arcades. It is the sequel to Rastan Saga. It was ported to the PC Engine only in Japan as well as the Sega Genesis.

Hamster Corporation re-released the game as part of the Arcade Archives series for the Nintendo Switch and PlayStation 4 in June 2024.

== Gameplay ==
Rastan Saga II is a side scrolling hack and slash game where the player takes the role of a barbarian who tries to defeat an evil wizard. The controls of Rastan consist of an eight-way joystick, a button for attacking, and a button for jumping. Like the first installment, the player is able to swing Rastan's sword in multiple directions. By using the joystick in combination with either button, the player can determine the height of Rastan's jumps.

There are a total of six rounds, each consisting of two areas: an outdoor scene, and a castle hall where the player must confront the stage's boss. The backgrounds of the outdoor areas feature broad landscapes with changing sunlight effects with detail. The game's bosses include Medusa, a Gladiator Centaur, and the final boss, the evil wizard.

== Reception ==
In Japan, Game Machine listed Rastan Saga II as the eighth most successful table arcade unit of May 1989.

Retrospective opinions have been mixed to negative. Chris Rasa of Hardcore Gaming 101 called the game "a huge step down from the original", with completely linear and "banal" level design, and poorly animated sprites. Ken Horowitz of Sega-16 rated the Genesis version a 5 out of 10, calling it a "decent hack-'n-slash" that is "fun enough to spend an afternoon or two with." However he lamented the removal of 2-player mode and the poor audio quality when compared to the arcade. Mark Bussler of Classic Game Room said the Genesis version has "painful, terrible music, and the visuals are just laughable", and criticized the level design as "mindless."
