= Space Invaders '95 =

1995 video game

- Developer: Taito
- Publisher: Taito
- Series: Space Invaders
- Platform: Arcade
- Release: JP: July 1995; NA/EU: 1995
- Genre: Fixed shooter
- Modes: Single-player, multiplayer
- Arcade system: Taito F3 System

Space Invaders '95: The Attack of Lunar Loonies (Note: Japanese: あっかんべぇだぁ〜, Hepburn: Akkanbēdā) is a 1995 parody fixed shooter game created by Taito for its Taito Cybercore system.

It is the sequel of Space Invaders DX and part of the influential Space Invaders series.

It was included in the Taito Legends 2 compilation for the PlayStation 2.

== Reception ==
Engadget complimented the game's colorful cartoony spin, noting its conceptual similarity to Parodius, a comparison that was also made by GamePro. The Spanish version of Retro Gamer commented on its humor and compared it to Cosmo Gang the Video.
