= List of Space Invaders video games =

Space Invaders
- Series logo
- Genre: Shoot 'em up
- Developer: Taito
- Publisher: Taito
- Creator: Tomohiro Nishikado
- First release: Space Invaders; April 1, 1978
- Latest release: Space Invaders Infinity Gene Evolve; April 3, 2025

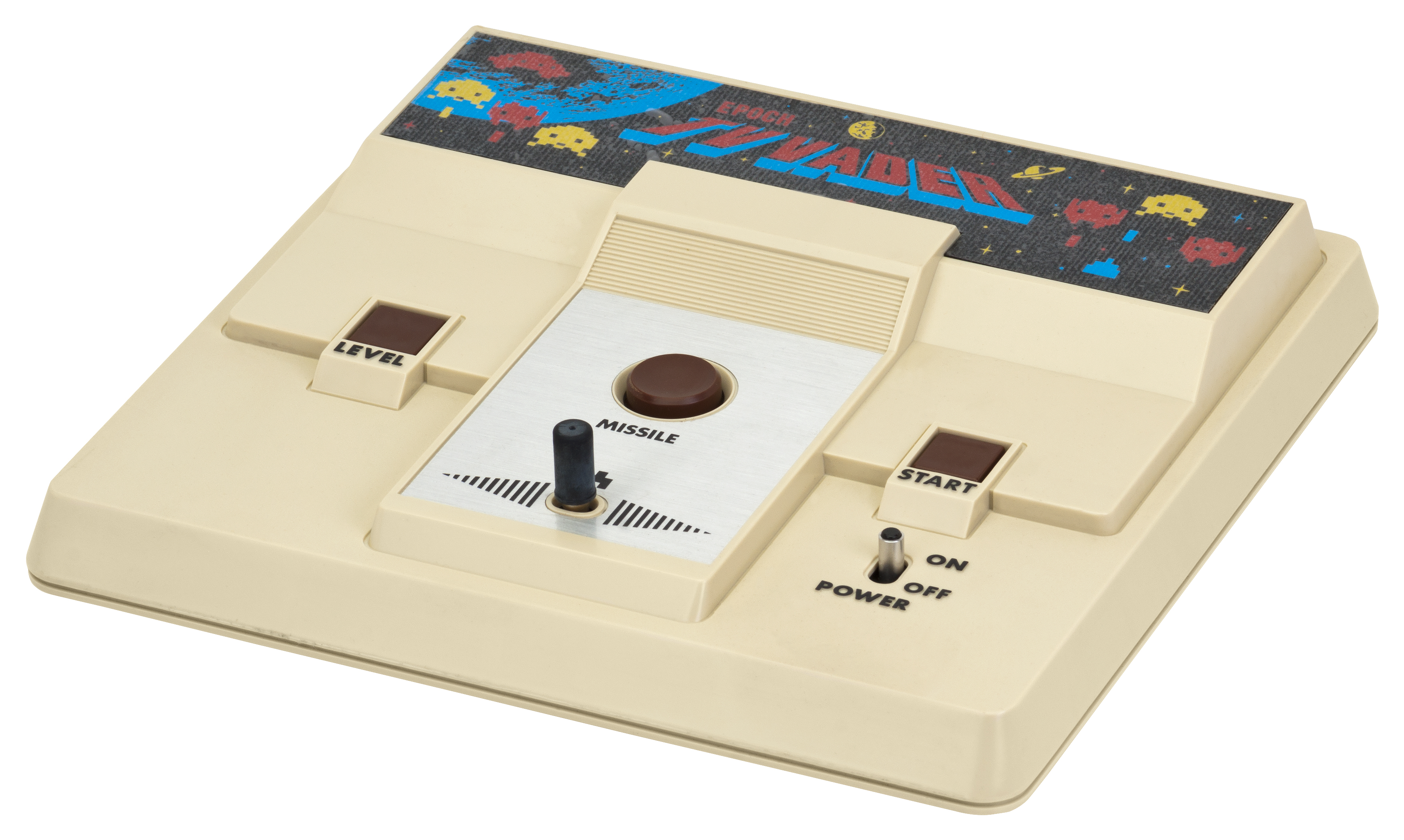
Epoch released the Japan-exclusive TV Vader in 1980, which was a Space Invaders clone that could be played at home.

Space Invaders is a fixed shooter video game released in 1978 by Taito. It was designed by Tomohiro Nishikado, who was inspired by other media such as Breakout, The War of the Worlds and Star Wars. It is one of the forerunners of modern video gaming and helped expand the video game industry from a novelty to a global industry. It was first released as an arcade game and later remade on different platforms; re-releases include ported and updated versions. Ported versions generally feature different graphics and additional gameplay options, including moving defense bunkers, zigzag shots, invisible aliens, and two-player modes. Space Invaders is one of the highest-grossing video game franchises of all time.

Taito released numerous sequels and spin-offs, many of which have also been remade on multiple platforms, including home consoles and handheld devices. Follow up titles are typically released in celebration of the original's anniversary. The first sequels were primarily released in arcades, while later titles were released on portable devices. Sequels often added power-ups and incorporated new gameplay mechanics—like three-dimensional playing fields, bosses, and rhythm-action—to the original's design. Most titles were released internationally, though some are exclusive to select regions. The games have received different receptions: the Atari 2600 port of the original became the video game industry's first "killer app", while some sequels were regarded as insignificant updates. Space Invaders and several of its arcade sequels are often included in video game compilations released by Taito.

It inspired numerous other games. Many companies created clones that copied its gameplay, with more than a hundred Space Invaders clones released for various platforms by the early 1980s (such as Super Invader and TI Invaders). Others built upon the original's gameplay (such as the Galaxian franchise). A live-action film adaptation is in development.

== Arcade games ==
Game	Details
Space Invaders Original release date(s): June 1978	Release years by system: 1978 – Arcade; 1980 – Atari 2600, Atari 8-bit 1982 – Atari 5200, Handheld electronic games 1985 – Nintendo Entertainment System, SG-1000; 1999 – WonderSwan; 2002 – VG Pocket Caplet; 2007 – Mobile phone 2009 – iOS
Space Invaders Original release date(s): June 1978	Notes: An urban legend blames the game for causing a shortage of yen in Japan, which led to an increase in production of 100-yen coins; however, 100-yen coin production was lower in 1978 and 1979 than in previous or subsequent years. The claim also doesn't hold up to logical scrutiny: arcade operators would have emptied out their machines and taken the money to the bank, thus keeping the coins in circulation. Reports from those living in Japan at the time indicate "nothing out of the ordinary ... during the height of the Space Invaders invasion."; By 1982, it had generated US$3.8 billion in revenue.; Several publications attribute the expansion of the video game industry from a novelty into a global industry to the success of the game.; The Atari 2600 version was the first official licensing of an arcade game and became the first "killer app" by quadrupling the system's sales.; The Atari versions feature different sets of gameplay variants.; The handheld electronic games include LCD and VFD versions developed by Tiger Electronics and Ramtex. Clones were also created by other companies.; Early 1980s handheld electronic versions are considered collectables.
Space Invaders Part II Original release date(s): 1979	Release years by system: 1979 – Arcade; 1990 – Game Boy and Skill for Prizes
Space Invaders Part II Original release date(s): 1979	Notes: It was released in the United States as Deluxe Space Invaders (also known as Space Invaders Deluxe); The United States version features a different graphical color scheme and a lunar-city background.; The Game Boy version was released only in Japan and used the Game Link Cable for the multiplayer mode.; The Skill for Prizes version is titled Prize Space Invaders and features increased difficulty. Players are rewarded with money.; Designer Nishikado prefers its gameplay over other Space Invaders titles, citing the game's variety.
Space Invaders II Original release date(s): 1980	Release years by system: 1980 – Arcade
Space Invaders II Original release date(s): 1980	Notes: It was released exclusively in the United States in a cocktail-table format.; The game features a competitive two-player mode.
Return of the Invaders Original release date(s): September 12, 1984	Release years by system: 1984 – Arcade
Return of the Invaders Original release date(s): September 12, 1984	Notes: It features updated color graphics as well as more complex movements and attack patterns for the aliens.; The game was developed by UPL.; It was Japan's top-grossing table arcade cabinet in April 1985.
Super Space Invaders '91 Original release date(s): 1990	Release years by system: 1990 – Arcade; 1991 – Amiga, Amstrad CPC, Atari ST, Commodore 64, Windows, and ZX Spectrum; 1992 – Master System; 1993 – Game Gear
Super Space Invaders '91 Original release date(s): 1990	Notes: Known as Majestic Twelve: The Space Invaders Part IV in Japan and in the USA.; The game features new graphics and gameplay elements, as well as a two-player mode.; It uses Taito's F1/F2 system hardware.; The home versions are titled Super Space Invaders.; The Sega Master System manual for the game included a comprehensive history of the Space Invaders franchise.; The original arcade version Majestic Twelve was reviewed in 1990, with David Wilson of Zero rating it 4.5 out of 5, and Your Sinclair giving it an 89% score.; The PC version of Super Space Invaders was reviewed by Hartley, Patricia and Kirk Lesser of Dragon magazine in 1992, rating it 2 out of 5 stars.
Minivaders Original release date(s): 1990	Release years by system: 1990 – Arcade
Minivaders Original release date(s): 1990	Notes: Made to comply with a Japanese law that required newly sold arcade cabinets to include a game.; The audio and scoring are omitted.
Space Invaders DX Original release date(s): September 1993	Release years by system: 1993 – Arcade; 1994 – Game Boy and Super Nintendo Entertainment System; 1995 – TurboGrafx-CD; 1996 – Sega Saturn; 1997 – PlayStation; 2001 – Nuon
Space Invaders DX Original release date(s): September 1993	Notes: A remake of the original with several new options and gameplay elements, including a competitive two-player mode.; Introduced a "parody mode" that replaces the traditional sprites by those from other Taito games including Arkanoid, Bubble Bobble, The NewZealand Story, and Darius.; Early versions use Taito's B system hardware, while later ones use Taito's F3 system hardware.; The home versions were released as Space Invaders - The Original Game. Other names include: Space Invaders XL on the Nuon, simply Space Invaders on the Game Boy and Sega Saturn, and Space Invaders 2000 and Space Invaders 1500 on two PlayStation re-releases.; The home releases feature variants of the two-player mode.; The Game Boy release was an update to the 1990 version of Space Invaders Part II. Extra options similar to Space Invaders DX are available when played via Nintendo's Super Game Boy.; The first PlayStation release lacked the two-player mode. Subsequent PlayStation re-releases in 1998 and 2001 restored it. The 2001 release, known as The Invaders and Space Invaders 1500, includes a 3D version, and was part of D3 Publisher's Simple series of budget games that sell for ¥1500.; The Super Nintendo Entertainment System version was also released on Nintendo's Virtual Console.
Space Invaders '95: The Attack of Lunar Loonies Original release date(s): June 1995	Release years by system: 1995 – Arcade
Space Invaders '95: The Attack of Lunar Loonies Original release date(s): June 1995	Notes: In a similar vein to the Parodius games, it is an updated, parody version of the original arcade game that features colorful, super deformed designs.; The game is known as Akkanvader in Japan.; It uses Taito's F3 system hardware.; A 2004 release on Windows PC was canceled, though it was included on Taito Legends 2 which has a Windows PC version.
Space Invaders CX Original release date(s): August 24, 2008	Release years by system: 2008 – Arcade
Space Invaders CX Original release date(s): August 24, 2008	Notes: A collaboration between Taito and Fuji TV's GameCenter CX; Features new sound effects and graphics based on the show
Space Invaders The Beat Attacker Original release date(s): 2008	Release years by system: 2008 – Arcade
Space Invaders The Beat Attacker Original release date(s): 2008	Notes: A rhythm-game style game in which the players shoots three defense turret by stepping over three control panels; Dedicated cabinet sports a giant LED display; The game awards achievement tickets which can be exchanged for prizes
Space Invaders Frenzy Original release date(s): January 2017	Release years by system: 2017 – Arcade
Space Invaders Frenzy Original release date(s): January 2017	Notes: Updated version of classic arcade game; Video game with redemption game features
Space Invaders Counter Attack Original release date(s): June 2020	Release years by system: 2020 – Arcade

== Home console games ==
Game	Details
Space Invaders: Fukkatsu no Hi Original release date(s): 1990	Release years by system: 1990 – PC Engine
Space Invaders: Fukkatsu no Hi Original release date(s): 1990	Notes: This Japanese-exclusive release featured two distinct games. The first is the color version of the original Space Invaders. The second game is Space Invaders Plus Version, an updated game with assets and gameplay elements derived from Majestic Twelve/Super Space Invaders '91.
Space Invaders 90 Original release date(s): JP: September 7, 1990; NA: 1991	Release years by system: 1990 – Sega Mega Drive
Space Invaders 90 Original release date(s): JP: September 7, 1990; NA: 1991	Notes: The game was released in North America as Space Invaders '91.
Space Invaders Original release date(s): October 5, 1999	Release years by system: 1999 – PlayStation, PC, Nintendo 64, and Game Boy Color
Space Invaders Original release date(s): October 5, 1999	Notes: It is known in Japan as Space Invaders X.; The title features 2D and 3D graphics, as well as co-operative and competitive modes for two players.; The Game Boy Color version features different graphics and uses a password system to access levels.; The PC version is included in the PC compilation pack Weekend Play Pack.; Crawfish Interactive developed the Game Boy Color release, while the other versions were developed by Z-Axis. Activision published the four versions.; A Dreamcast version was cancelled.
Space Invaders Get Even Original release date(s): JP: August 26, 2008; EU: November 7, 2008; NA: December 1, 2008	Release years by system: 2008 – Wii
Space Invaders Get Even Original release date(s): JP: August 26, 2008; EU: November 7, 2008; NA: December 1, 2008	Notes: The game is available on the Wii via Nintendo's WiiWare service.; It was released as part of the original's 30th anniversary.; Players control the alien invaders as they attack the Earth.

== Portable and handheld games ==
Game	Details
Space Invaders Original release date(s): 1999	Release years by system: 1999 – Color FX
Space Invaders Original release date(s): 1999	Notes: It is a handheld LCD game developed by MGA Entertainment.; A virtual reality version was later released as part of a Color FX Virtual Reality 3D Games line.
Space Invaders Original release date(s): GBC: NA: October 27, 1999; EU: November 1999; JP: September 29, 2000; GBA: NA: March 19, 2002; EU: May 3, 2002; JP: August 2, 2002	Release years by system: 1999 - Game Boy Color; 2002 – Game Boy Advance
Space Invaders Original release date(s): GBC: NA: October 27, 1999; EU: November 1999; JP: September 29, 2000; GBA: NA: March 19, 2002; EU: May 3, 2002; JP: August 2, 2002	Notes: Based on Z-Axis's 1999 multiplatform release of Space Invaders, the game features updated graphics and new gameplay elements: levels, worlds, aliens.; It uses the Game Link Cable for the two-player mode.; The original arcade version is included.; Developed by Crawfish Interactive (original GBC version) and Torus Games (GBA update) and published by Activision in most regions, Taito in Japan.; The game is known as Space Invaders EX in Japan.
Space Invaders Revolution Original release date(s): JP: March 24, 2005; NA: September 20, 2005; EU: July 8, 2005	Release years by system: 2005 – Nintendo DS
Space Invaders Revolution Original release date(s): JP: March 24, 2005; NA: September 20, 2005; EU: July 8, 2005	Notes: It is known in Japan as Space Invaders DS.; The game features two modes of play: a classic version that emulates the original arcade game, and an updated version with different stages and aliens.; Tomohiro Nishikado oversaw the game's development.
Space Invaders Evolution Original release date(s): JP: September 22, 2005; EU: November 3, 2006; AU: October 27, 2006	Release years by system: 2005 – PlayStation Portable
Space Invaders Evolution Original release date(s): JP: September 22, 2005; EU: November 3, 2006; AU: October 27, 2006	Notes: The game is known in Japan as Space Invaders: Galaxy Beat.; It features 3D graphics and new modes of play including multiplayer.; Elements of rhythm-action gameplay are incorporated.
Space Invaders Extreme Original release date(s): JP: February 21, 2008; NA: June 17, 2008; EU: July 4, 2008; AU: July 30, 2008	Release years by system: 2008 – Nintendo DS and PlayStation Portable; 2009 – Xbox Live Arcade; 2018 – Microsoft Windows
Space Invaders Extreme Original release date(s): JP: February 21, 2008; NA: June 17, 2008; EU: July 4, 2008; AU: July 30, 2008	Notes: The game features similar gameplay as the original arcade version integrated with musical elements.; It was released as part of the original's 30th anniversary.
Space Invaders Extreme 2 Original release date(s): JP: March 26, 2009; EU: October 2, 2009; NA: October 19, 2009	Release years by system: 2009 - Nintendo DS
Space Invaders Extreme 2 Original release date(s): JP: March 26, 2009; EU: October 2, 2009; NA: October 19, 2009	Notes: The sequel features new content compared to its predecessor.; Gameplay utilizes both screens of the DS at the same time; "Round" and "Fever" phases occur on the top screen during regular play.; A condensed version, Space Invaders Extreme Z, was made available in Japan as a downloadable DSiWare title.
Space Invaders Infinity Gene Original release date(s): 2009	Release years by system: 2009 – Mobile phone and iOS; 2010 – PlayStation 3 and Xbox 360; 2013 – Android
Space Invaders Infinity Gene Original release date(s): 2009	Notes: It features role-playing video game elements and music by Zuntata.; The game was released as part of the original's 30th anniversary.; Taito later announced home console versions via Xbox Live Arcade and PlayStation Network.
Space Invaders: Hidden Heroes Original release date(s): 2021	Release years by system: 2021 – Mobile phone
Space Invaders: Hidden Heroes Original release date(s): 2021	Notes: Developed by Square Enix Montréal.; The first game in the series to use AR technology.; Announced on March 18, 2021, during Square Enix Presents.; Shuts down on January 4, 2023
Space Invaders: World Defense Original release date(s): July 17, 2023	Release years by system: 2023 – Mobile phone
Space Invaders: World Defense Original release date(s): July 17, 2023	Notes: Developed by Taito in collaboration with Google.; The second game in the series to use AR technology.; The game was released as part of the original's 45th anniversary.; Announced on May 10, 2023, during Google's I/O conference.
Space Invaders Infinity Gene Evolve Original release date(s): April 3, 2025	Release years by system: 2025 – iOS, macOS, tvOS
Space Invaders Infinity Gene Evolve Original release date(s): April 3, 2025	Notes: It features role-playing video game elements and music by Zuntata.; Exclusive to Apple Arcade.

== Compilations ==
Game	Details
Space Invaders Virtual Collection Original release date(s): JP: December 1, 1995	Release years by system: 1995 – Virtual Boy
Space Invaders Virtual Collection Original release date(s): JP: December 1, 1995	Notes: The collection features 2D and 3D versions of the original game and Space Invaders Part II.; It is one of the rarest commercially released games.
Space Invaders/Qix - Silver Anniversary Edition Original release date(s): 2003	Release years by system: 2003 – Arcade
Space Invaders/Qix - Silver Anniversary Edition Original release date(s): 2003	Notes: This is a compilation of the original Space Invaders and Qix.; It was released as part of the original's 25th anniversary and Taito's 50th anniversary.
Space Invaders Anniversary Original release date(s): 2003	Release years by system: 2003 – Arcade, PlayStation 2, and PC
Space Invaders Anniversary Original release date(s): 2003	Notes: The compilation includes four variants of the original Space Invaders (Monochrome, Cellophane, Color, and Upright), Space Invaders Part II with the option to play an Upright variant of it, and three new games (Space Invaders Doubles, Space Invaders 3D, and Space Invaders VS); It was released as part of the original's 25th anniversary and Taito's 50th anniversary.; In North America, only the PC version was released as part of the Weekend Play Pack.
Space Invaders Pocket Original release date(s): JP: May 12, 2005	Release years by system: 2005 – PlayStation Portable
Space Invaders Pocket Original release date(s): JP: May 12, 2005	Notes: The compilation includes four variants of the original title (Black & White, Cellophane, Upright, and Color), Space Invaders Part II, Return of the Invaders, Super Space Invaders '91, and Space Invaders '95.; Super Space Invaders '91 includes new content intended for its arcade release.; It was the first Universal Media Disc released in Japan to include a BIOS version checker for the PlayStation Portable.; The developers purposely reproduced programming errors present in the original Space Invaders.
Taito Memories Volume 1 Original release date(s): JP: July 28, 2005	Release years by system: 2005 – PlayStation 2
Taito Memories Volume 1 Original release date(s): JP: July 28, 2005	Notes: The title is a compilation of Taito's classic arcade games.; It features the original Space Invaders with color graphics, Super Space Invaders '91, and Space Invaders DX.; An earlier version was planned for the Nokia N-Gage in 2003; Super Space Invaders was one of the three games planned to be included. The title was canceled.
Taito Memories Volume 2 Original release date(s): JP: August 25, 2005	Release years by system: 2005 – PlayStation 2
Taito Memories Volume 2 Original release date(s): JP: August 25, 2005	Notes: The title is a compilation of Taito's classic arcade games.; It features the original Space Invaders, Space Invaders Part II, and Space Invaders '95.
Taito Legends Original release date(s): EU: October 14, 2005; NA: October 25, 2005	Release years by system: 2005 – PlayStation 2, Xbox, and PC
Taito Legends Original release date(s): EU: October 14, 2005; NA: October 25, 2005	Notes: It is a compilation of Taito's classic arcade games.; The compilation includes Space Invaders, Space Invaders Part II and Return of the Invaders.
Taito Legends Power-Up Original release date(s): NA: May 16, 2007; EU: March 31, 2006; AU: March 30, 2006	Release years by system: 2006 – PlayStation Portable
Taito Legends Power-Up Original release date(s): NA: May 16, 2007; EU: March 31, 2006; AU: March 30, 2006	Notes: The title is a compilation of Taito's classic arcade games.; The compilation includes Space Invaders, Space Invaders Part II, and Return of the Invaders.
Taito Legends 2 Original release date(s): EU: October 6, 2006; AU: November 9, 2006; NA: May 17, 2007	Release years by system: 2006 – PlayStation 2, Xbox, and PC
Taito Legends 2 Original release date(s): EU: October 6, 2006; AU: November 9, 2006; NA: May 17, 2007	Notes: It is a compilation of Taito's classic arcade games.; It includes Space Invaders '95, Super Space Invaders '91 and Space Invaders DX.
Taito Memories II Volume 1 Original release date(s): JP: January 25, 2007	Release years by system: 2007 – PlayStation 2
Taito Memories II Volume 1 Original release date(s): JP: January 25, 2007	Notes: The title is a compilation of Taito's classic arcade games.; Return of the Invaders is one of the games that is included.
Space Invaders Trilogy Original release date(s): 2007	Release years by system: 2007 – Mobile phone
Space Invaders Trilogy Original release date(s): 2007	Notes: The mobile phone game is a compilation developed by HanaHo Games.; It includes the original Space Invaders, Space Invaders Part II, and Return of the Invaders.
Space Invaders Invincible Collection Original release date(s): JP: March 26, 2020; WW: August 17, 2021	Release years by system: 2020 – Nintendo Switch
Space Invaders Invincible Collection Original release date(s): JP: March 26, 2020; WW: August 17, 2021	Notes: The largest Space Invaders compilation to date, with a total of 10 titles (12 including version variants).
Space Invaders Forever Original release date(s): WW: December 11, 2020; NA: December 15, 2020(Switch)	Release years by system: 2020 – Nintendo Switch and PlayStation 4
Space Invaders Forever Original release date(s): WW: December 11, 2020; NA: December 15, 2020(Switch)	Notes: Includes Arkanoid vs. Space Invaders, Space Invaders Gigamax 4 SE, and Space Invaders Extreme.

== Other titles ==
Game	Details
Pepsi Invaders Original release date(s): 1983	Release years by system: 1983 – Atari 2600
Pepsi Invaders Original release date(s): 1983	Notes: It was produced specifically for The Coca-Cola Company employees for their rivalry against PepsiCo.; The game is also known colloquially as Coke Wins, due to the fact that the phrase appears at the top of the screen at the end of the game.; It features individual letters spelling out "PEPSI" in place of the aliens.; It is one of the rarest video games produced; only 125 copies were made.
PD Ultraman Invaders Original release date(s): JP: December 22, 1995	Release years by system: 1995 – PlayStation
PD Ultraman Invaders Original release date(s): JP: December 22, 1995	Notes: It is an Ultraman-themed shooting game based on Space Invaders.; Features several modes of play including a multiplayer mode.; Developed by Taito and published by Bandai.
Space Raiders Original release date(s): JP: December 19, 2002; EU: September 5, 2003; NA: April 19, 2004	Release years by system: 2002 – GameCube, PlayStation 2
Space Raiders Original release date(s): JP: December 19, 2002; EU: September 5, 2003; NA: April 19, 2004	Notes: The game is also known as Space Invaders: Invasion Day.; It is a Taito developed third-person shooter reminiscent of Space Invaders.
Space Invaders Collection Original release date(s): 2003	Release years by system: 2003 – ColecoVision and MSX
Space Invaders Collection Original release date(s): 2003	Notes: It is an unofficial compilation of Space Invaders, Space Invaders Part II, and Space Invaders Deluxe.; The collection was developed by Opcode Games.; Taito contacted Opcode Games about the project but ceased contact during development.
Arcade Legends: Space Invaders Original release date(s): 2004	Release years by system: 2004 – Plug & play
Arcade Legends: Space Invaders Original release date(s): 2004	Notes: The game is a plug & play game controller that plays Space Invaders and four other classic Taito arcade games. The version of Space Invaders included in this plug & play is based on the Famicom version, instead of the original arcade version.; A later plug & play called Retro Arcade...Space Invaders has Space Invaders with nine other Taito arcade games that are different from the other four in the previous version.; A Space Invaders themed plug & play released in 2017 was distributed by MSI Entertainment and supplied by WinFun. It only includes the Famicom version of Space Invaders.; Space Invaders is also the main game of the Legends Flash Blast! released in 2018 by AtGames. The eleven other games included are Atari 2600 ports of other Taito and Data East arcade games.
Space Invaders × Pac-Man Original release date(s): JP: September 1, 2005	Release years by system: 2005 – Mobile phone
Space Invaders × Pac-Man Original release date(s): JP: September 1, 2005	Notes: The title is a collection of two cross-over games that swaps characters between Taito's Space Invaders and Namco's Pac-Man.; It was released for a limited time (September 1, 2005 – October 31, 2005) via NTT DoCoMo's i-mode service.; The game was released as part of Namco's 50th anniversary, as well as to commemorate the 25th anniversary of Pac-Man.
Yawaraka Sensha vs Space Invaders Original release date(s): November 2006	Release years by system: 2006 – Mobile phone
Yawaraka Sensha vs Space Invaders Original release date(s): November 2006	Notes: It is an Adobe Flash-based video game developed by Taito.; The game features elements from Space Invaders and the Livedoor animation series Yawaraka Sensha (やわらか戦車)
Space Invaders Pinball Original release date(s): 2007	Release years by system: 2007 – Mobile phone
Space Invaders Pinball Original release date(s): 2007	Notes: It is a Space Invaders-themed pinball video game developed by Taito.
Minna de Invaders Original release date(s): 2007	Release years by system: 2007 – Mobile phone
Minna de Invaders Original release date(s): 2007	Notes: The title, Minna de Invaders (みんなでインベーダー), translates as "Invaders for Everyone".; It is a collection of mini-games that feature the aliens from Space Invaders.; The four mini-games—Invader Bound, Invader Chain, Invader Catcher, and Invader Click—were released from 2007 to 2008.
Space Invaders World War Original release date(s): April 2008	Release years by system: 2008 – Web browser
Space Invaders World War Original release date(s): April 2008	Notes: Space Invaders World War was a Flash-based massively multiplayer online game that tracked scores from 193 countries.; Service of the game lasted from April 18, 2008 to September 30, 2009.; In conjunction with the game's release, Italian clothing company 55DSL released its own version along with a Space Invaders t-shirt.
Arkanoid vs. Space Invaders Original release date(s): May 17, 2017	Release years by system: 2017 – Android, iOS; 2020 – Nintendo Switch, PlayStation 4
Arkanoid vs. Space Invaders Original release date(s): May 17, 2017	Notes: Arkanoid vs. Space Invaders marks the first time that Arkanoid and Space Invaders have crossed-over.; The game was originally free to play for the LINE service.; Other Taito characters cameo as powerups such as Bub and Bob from Bubble Bobble, Chack’n and Monsta from Chack'n Pop, Iron Fossil from Dariusburst and Tiki from The NewZealand Story.; Re-released on Nintendo Switch and PlayStation 4 as part of Space Invaders Invincible Collection and Space Invaders Forever.; The Nintendo Switch version is presented as a separate download and only plays in handheld mode.
Space Invaders Gigamax Original release date(s): January 12, 2018	Release years by system: 2018 – Event; 2020 – Nintendo Switch, PlayStation 4; 2024 – Arcade
Space Invaders Gigamax Original release date(s): January 12, 2018	Notes: Space Invaders Gigamax marks the first Space Invaders game to be playable with up to 10 players.; Released to celebrate Space Invaders' 40th Anniversary; Distributed by Live Interactive Works; Playable at certain events; Known as Space Invaders Gigamax 20 when playable at Huis Ten Bosch, and was playable up to 20 players.; Re-released on Nintendo Switch and PlayStation 4 as Space Invaders Gigamax 4 SE, as part of Space Invaders Invincible Collection and Space Invaders Forever.; Reduces the player amount to 4 players in Gigamax 4 SE; Re-released for Arcades as Space Invaders Gigamax R, and is playable up to 6 players.

== See also ==
- Galaxian, a successful shooting game based on Space Invaders, and released by Namco in 1979.
- Galaga, a sequel of Galaxian.
- Defender, a successful shooting game partially based on Space Invaders, and released by Williams Electronics in 1980.
