= Space Invaders Invincible Collection =

2020 video game compilation

- Developers: Taito; Gotch Technology
- Publishers: JP: Taito; WW: ININ Games
- Director: Yuichi Toyama
- Series: Space Invaders
- Platforms: Nintendo Switch; PlayStation 4
- Release: Invincible; Nintendo Switch: JP: March 26, 2020; WW: August 17, 2021; Forever; Switch, PS4: WW: December 11, 2020; JP: June 17, 2021
- Genre: Fixed shooter
- Modes: Single-player, multiplayer

Space Invaders Invincible Collection is a video game compilation of various Space Invaders titles developed by Taito and Gotch Technology. It was released in Japan for the Nintendo Switch on March 26, 2020.

== Release ==
The game was released in a regular edition and special edition, with the regular edition containing three fewer games than the special edition. The Special Edition, in addition to containing additional games, was initially only sold bundled with various premium physical collectible items. Also available for a limited time was a special Amazon Japan Prime Day exclusive pre-order bonus DLC game, the Sega Mega Drive (JPN) game, Space Invaders 90. The Special Edition, containing the complete collection of games, was also released as a limited Famitsu DX Pack version, with different physical bundled items being the only difference. A western release of the complete collection for Nintendo Switch, based on the Japanese Special Edition (but without the "Special Edition" subtitle), distributed by Strictly Limited Games, opened pre-orders on June 28, 2020, available with and without physical collectible items. Orders started arriving in June 2021. A Western budget edition of the collection, entitled Space Invaders Forever, was released in December 2020, for the Nintendo Switch and PlayStation 4, including only the most recent titles in the compilation. The budget Space Invaders Forever got its first Japanese release (digital only) for Nintendo Switch and PlayStation 4, on June 17, 2021. A worldwide digital release of Invincible Collection (subtitled Special Edition in Japan) for Nintendo Switch was announced in 2021, released in Japan on July 29, 2021 (with that region also finally getting a physical retail release without the physical collectible items on that same date). The western digital release was August 17 of that same year.

== Editions ==
There are four editions of this collection. All titled as Space Invaders Invincible Collection, except for the budget release, Space Invaders Forever:

Japanese releases

- Standard Edition (Nintendo Switch, physical and digital)
- Special Edition (Nintendo Switch, physical only)
- Space Invaders Forever (Nintendo Switch, PlayStation 4, digital only)

International releases (physical and digital)

- Space Invaders Forever (Nintendo Switch, PlayStation 4)
- Space Invaders Invincible Collection (Nintendo Switch)

Almost all of the editions feature different games. The only collection on PlayStation 4 is Space Invaders Forever, which is also the only way to play Arkanoid vs. Space Invaders on a TV. All of the Switch collections have Arkanoid vs. Space Invaders appear as a separate icon on the Switch menu, only playable in handheld mode. The initial Japanese collections had this game as a download code only.

Title	Original Platform	Standard Edition	Special Edition	Forever	Invincible (International)
Space Invaders (b/w)	Arcade	check	check		check
Space Invaders (color)	Arcade	check	check		check
Space Invaders Part II	Arcade	check	check		check
Majestic Twelve: The Space Invaders Part IV	Arcade	check	check		check
Super Space Invaders '91	Arcade	check	check		check
Arkanoid vs. Space Invaders	Mobile game	check	check	check	check
Space Invaders Extreme	Microsoft Windows	check	check	check	check
Space Invaders Gigamax 4 SE	Arcade Event Game	check	check	check	check
Lunar Rescue	Arcade		check		check
Space Cyclone	Arcade		check		check
Space Invaders DX	Arcade		check		check
Space Invaders 90	Sega Mega Drive (JPN)	Switch Amazon Prime Day Bonus DLC	Switch Amazon Prime Day Bonus DLC		

== Reception ==
Reception

Aggregate score
Aggregator	Score
Metacritic	77/100

Review scores
Publication	Score
Electronic Gaming Monthly	4/5 stars
Hardcore Gamer	4/5
Nintendo Life	7/10 stars

Space Invaders Invincible Collection received "generally favorable" reviews, according to review aggregator website Metacritic.

Mollie L. Patterson of EGM gave the game 4 stars out of 5 and wrote, "Space Invaders Invincible Collection certainly isn't the collection it could have been, and definitely isn't a collection for everyone, but it is still a great look back at the Space Invaders franchise for those interested in such a thing." Jeremy Peeples of Hardcore Gamer rated it similarly and called it a "must-buy for anyone who has wanted to play more of the series", while writing, "Space Invaders Invincible Collection plays great, looks fantastic and showcases just how strong the franchise's sound design has always been." Gonçalo Lopes of Nintendo Life praised the compilation's fresh gameplay, online leaderboards, and customization options, but criticized the highly priced Special Edition, lack of docked mode for Arkanoid vs. Space Invaders, and the minimalist gameplay that would be inaccessible to a younger audience.
