= Space Invaders Virtual Collection =

1995 video game compilation

- Developer: Taito
- Publisher: Taito
- Director: Toshiki Sakai
- Designer: Tomohiro Nishikado
- Programmer: Tatsuya Kitasawa
- Composer: Fumito Tamayama
- Series: Space Invaders
- Platform: Virtual Boy
- Release: JP: December 1, 1995
- Genre: Fixed shooter
- Mode: Single-player

Space Invaders Virtual Collection (Note: Japanese: スペースインベーダーバーチャルコレクション) is a 1995 compilation video game developed and published by Taito in Japan for the Virtual Boy. It includes direct ports of the arcade game Space Invaders (1978) and its sequel Space Invaders Part II (1979), alongside 3D remakes that take advantage of the Virtual Boy's hardware capabilities. Both games feature a number of alternative gameplay modes, such as score attack and time attack.

Development of the game was headed by director Toshiki Sakai, with music composed by Fumito Tamayama and programming by Tatsuya Kitasawa. Space Invaders creator Tomohiro Nishikado is credited for the remade arcade ports. Virtual Collection was met with a mixed reaction from critics; some praised the game's accurate versions of the included games and 3D effects, while others criticized its lack of content and small number of titles. It is notable for being one of the rarest Virtual Boy games released, with original copies demanding high prices on online auction sites.

== Gameplay ==
In-game screenshot of the 3D remake of Space Invaders. Like all other Virtual Boy games, it displays graphics in red and black.

Space Invaders Virtual Collection includes direct ports of the arcade game Space Invaders (1978) and its sequel Space Invaders Part II (1979). In both games, the player controls a laser base which must eliminate all of the aliens that march down from the top of the screen, who plot to take over Earth. Aliens will slowly move towards the edge of the screen and then go downward, and will become faster as more aliens are destroyed. The player can hide behind large shields that protect them from enemy shots. However, the shields will become damaged if hit by either the player or an alien's projectile. A UFO will occasionally appear towards the top of the screen, which can be shot down for bonus points. Space Invaders Part II features slight alterations to the gameplay, such as new aliens that split into smaller ones when shot, a flashing UFO which can only be hit when it becomes visible, and short intermissions in-between stages.

Virtual Collection features 3D remakes of both titles, taking advantage of the Virtual Boy's hardware capabilities. The games place the player in a third-person perspective, with aliens appearing further in the background and the laser base towards the front. Gameplay is otherwise identical to the originals, featuring a pre-rendered backdrop depicting a futuristic metropolis. All versions of the games include a score attack mode, where the objective is to achieve the highest score under a time limit, and a time attack mode, where the player must destroy an entire formation of aliens as quickly as possible.

== Development and release ==
Space Invaders Virtual Collection was released by Taito for the Virtual Boy in Japan on December 1, 1995. Development of the game was headed by director Toshiki Sakai, with programming done by Tatsuya Kitasawa and music composed by Fumito Tamayama. Tomohiro Nishikado, the creator of the original Space Invaders, is credited for the arcade game ports. Like all other titles for the Virtual Boy, it uses a red and black color scheme and 3D visual effects.

Space Invaders Virtual Collection received its first western release on May 14, 2026, when it was added to the Nintendo Classics service.

== Reception and legacy ==
Reception

Review scores
Publication	Score
Famitsu	4/10, 4/10, 4/10, 3/10 (Note: Each of the four reviewers in Famitsu scored the game on a ten point scale)
N64 Magazine	84%

Space Invaders Virtual Collection was met with a mixed reaction from critics; while some praised the accurate versions of the included games and 3D effects, others criticized its lack of content and small number of titles.

Famitsu magazine was particularly negative towards the game, saying it made for a "pointless" entry to the console's library due to its lack of content and for not taking advantage of the Virtual Boy's hardware capabilities. They also wrote that other console ports of Space Invaders made for a more worthwhile experience, notably Space Invaders: The Original Game on the Super Nintendo Entertainment System. Jeremy Parish said the compilation would be much more worthwhile had other Space Invaders games been included, namely Majestic Twelve, Space Invaders '95 and Minivaders, and that the low amount of content makes it a hard sell. N64 Magazine disliked the game's lack of a save battery and the player's base being too slow to maneuver. Retro Gamer magazine wrote that the 3D remakes failed to be as enjoyable as the original versions, making for a disappointing update.

Several would praise the accurate portrayals of the included games and the 3D remakes for taking advantage of the console's hardware. Parish recommended the game to Space Invaders fans for its excellent emulation quality, and for the 3D remakes providing a unique and interesting take on the core gameplay. N64 Magazine liked the game's detailed backdrops in the 3D mode and the additional gameplay modes for adding replay value, but noted that it was diminished due to the lack of a save battery. French publication Revival compared the 3D modes favorably to Breakout 2000 on the Atari Jaguar, writing that it was one of the major selling points of the compilation, concluding it was worth the purchase for fans of the original.

Space Invaders Virtual Collection is notable for being one of the rarest Virtual Boy games ever released, a fact attributed to a limited production run and the downfall of the console itself. Copies of the game typically command high prices on online auction sites such as eBay, some upwards of over US$1,000 or more. Parish noted that the high price point made the game near-impossible to justify a purchase, further saying it would have been a "no-brainer pickup" had it gone for $20 or $30. Retrogames UK disagreed with his statement, saying that the 3D remakes and original ports made the game a must-own for Virtual Boy collectors.
