= Arkanoid Returns =

1997 video game

- Promotional flyer
- Developer: Taito
- Publisher: Taito
- Designer: Kumi Mizobe
- Series: Arkanoid
- Platforms: Arcade, PlayStation
- Release: WW: February 1997
- Genre: Block breaker
- Modes: Single-player, multiplayer
- Arcade system: Taito F3 System

Arkanoid Returns (Note: Japanese: アルカノイドリターンズ, Hepburn: Arukanoido Ritānzu) is an arcade game released by Taito in February 1997 as part of the Arkanoid series. It is the fourth overall, and third to be released in arcades. The game was ported to the PlayStation later the same year, with an updated home release being released afterwards titled Arkanoid R 2000.

== Gameplay ==
A player engaging in a level

The gameplay remains similar to Arkanoid: Doh it Again, the previous game in the series, in that it features the same powerups (with the addition of the brown "G" Giga Ball), some re-used level designs, and the same board size. The initial arcade game contains only 50 levels, the environment changing every 9 levels. A code can be entered before starting the game to begin a new set of 50 levels starting from Level 51, ending with a confrontation with Doh. Arkanoid R 2000 continues onto Round 51 immediately from Round 50, invalidating the need for a code entry, and includes an extra campaign with 100 new levels, several new block types, a rainbow power up (later known as "V" Vanish), and a new worm boss. This release also contained a level editor.

== Reception ==
Reception

Review score
Publication	Score
Famitsu	24/40

In Japan, Game Machine listed Arkanoid Returns as being the fifth most popular arcade game of May 1997.
