= Space Invaders DX =

1993 video game

- Arcade flyer
- Developer: Taito
- Publisher: Taito
- Producer: Keusuke Kasigawa
- Composer: Katsuhisa Ishikawa
- Series: Space Invaders
- Platforms: Arcade, Super Famicom, PC Engine CD, Sega Saturn, PlayStation
- Release: September 1993: Arcade; JP: September 1993 Super Famicom; JP: March 25, 1994 PC Engine CD; JP: July 28, 1995 Saturn; JP: December 13, 1996 PlayStation; JP: July 31, 1997
- Genre: Fixed shooter
- Modes: Single-player, multiplayer
- Arcade system: Taito B System, Taito F3 System

Space Invaders DX (Note: Japanese: スペースインベーダーDX, Hepburn: Supēsu Inbēdā DX) is a 1993 fixed shooter video game developed and published by Taito for Japanese arcades. It is the fifth entry in the long-running Space Invaders series, and was later ported to several consoles including the Super Famicom, PC Engine Super CD, and Sega Saturn; several of these conversions use the name Space Invaders: The Original Game (Note: Japanese: スペースインベーダー THE ORIGINAL GAME, Hepburn: Supēsu Inbēdā Za Orijinaru Gēmu). The player assumes control of a laser base that must fend off waves of incoming enemies, who march down in formation towards the bottom of the screen. DX contains four variations of the original Space Invaders, in addition to a multiplayer mode and a "Parody Mode" that replaces the characters with those from other Taito franchises. Home ports of DX received mixed reviews for their high price point and general lack of content.

== Gameplay ==
Space Invaders DX contains a two-player versus mode, in addition to a port of the arcade original.

Space Invaders DX contains an updated version of the original Space Invaders alongside several other additional features. As in the original, the player controls a laser base situated at the bottom of the screen, who must destroy each formation of invaders before they successfully take over Earth. Formations march towards the bottom by moving to the side of the screen and then downward. The laser base can only fire one shot at a time, and must wait before it either collides with an enemy or goes off the screen. The invaders become faster as more are destroyed. Four shields are placed above the player, who can hide behind them for protection from enemy fire; however, the shields become damaged when inflicted with fire from either the invaders or the player. A UFO will occasionally appear towards the top of the screen, which can be shot down for bonus points.

DX allows the player to select from one of four different game types; a black and white monitor, a color monitor, a version that places fake layers of cellophane across the screen to mimic color, and a “reflector” type that features a recreation of the backdrop found in upright Space Invaders machines. A two-player versus mode is also present, where two players compete against each other by destroying endless waves of invaders until the other side's base is destroyed enough times. Shooting colored invaders causes various effects to occur, such as having the opponent's invaders descend a level or add an extra row of invaders to their side. The arcade version features a "Parody Mode" that replaces the characters with those from other Taito franchises, including Bubble Bobble, Arkanoid, and Darius. The Sega Saturn and PC Engine CD releases add a new mode called “Kawaii Mode”, which replaces the backdrops with cartoony, anime-style characters and an arranged soundtrack, while featuring the same Space Invaders gameplay.

== Development and release ==
Taito released Space Invaders DX in September 1993 to commemorate the 15th anniversary of the Space Invaders series. Early versions of the game were designed to run on the company's B System arcade system board, with later ones using its cartridge-based F3 System. The game was produced by Keisuke Kasigawa and composed by Katsuhisa Ishikawa, credited as “Babi” in-game. Space Invaders creator Tomohiro Nishikado is also credited for the port of the original.

DX was ported to the Super Famicom on March 25, 1994, to celebrate Taito's 40th anniversary, which renamed it Space Invaders: The Original Game. A Game Boy port of the original game, simply titled Space Invaders, was also released in North America and Europe in 1994; this version features the DX game as a hidden extra, accessible by inserting the cartridge into the Super Game Boy peripheral for the Super NES.

The game was ported to the PC Engine CD on July 28, 1995, followed by the Sega Saturn on December 13, 1996; the Saturn version was re-released as part of a bundle with Puzzle Bobble 2X two years later. The Super NES version is included as a bonus game in PD Ultraman Invaders, released for the PlayStation in late 1995 by Bandai. It was later ported to the PlayStation on July 31, 1997; this port was later published as a budget title by D3 Publisher in 1999 as part of its Simple series of budget games, renamed Simple 1500: THE Invader. The Super Famicom version was digitally re-released for the Wii Virtual Console on September 16, 2008, in Japan, November 17, 2008, in North America, and on November 28, 2008, in Europe.

== Reception ==
Reception

Review scores
Publication	Score
AllGame	4/5
Eurogamer	5/10
Famitsu	6/10, 4/10, 6/10, 5/10 (SFC)
IGN	5/10
Nintendo Life	2/10
Nintendo Power	3.9/10
Mega Play	41%

The Super Famicom version of Space Invaders DX in particular was met with a polarizing reception at its release and retrospectively, with common complaints being towards its lack of content and any addition of a remade version of the game. Several liked the game's multiplayer mode and visual options, alongside for it being a good version of the game overall.

German publication Mega Play unfavorably compared the PC Engine CD version to Galaga '88 and the previously released Space Invaders: Fukkatsu no Hi, critical of its gameplay and lack of features. Mega Play did applaud the multiplayer mode and quality of the conversion, highly recommending it to fans of the series. Nintendo Power felt relatively the same, claiming fans of the original would appreciate the quality of the package itself and its multiplayer features, while also saying those who didn't have much experience with the series would dislike its overall repetitive gameplay and lack of content. Famitsu magazine disliked the Sega Saturn version for lacking any updated version of the original aside from its multiplayer and "Kawaii" modes, both of which they liked for their uniqueness. Allgame said that Space Invaders is "inherently fun in all its incarnations", liking its multiplayer mode and overall quality of the package. They added that Taito should have also included Space Invaders Part II, and felt lukewarm towards the lack of a remade version with updated visuals and sounds. Retro Gamer magazine greatly applauded the PlayStation version's multiplayer mode, finding it superior to those in other versions of the games.

The Wii Virtual Console port was often criticized for its high price point, with several outlets saying it made the game difficult to recommend. Nintendo Life was the most critical, saying that its price of 800 Wii Points (US$8) and "dated" gameplay made it a disappointment. They also added that the game was somewhat dated and that the multiplayer mode was not well made nor fun to play. Eurogamer and IGN felt differently about the gameplay itself, both finding it to be an excellent version of the arcade original and for the multiplayer mode being enjoyable. IGN also liked the different visual options and for the game still holding up years after its release.
