= Space Cyclone =

1980 video game

- Arcade flyer
- Developer: Taito
- Publisher: Taito
- Series: Space Invaders
- Platform: Arcade
- Release: JP: October 1980
- Genre: Fixed shooter
- Modes: Single-player, multiplayer

Space Cyclone (Note: Japanese: スペースサイクロン, Hepburn: Supēsu Saikuron) is a 1980 fixed shooter video game developed and published by Taito for arcades. It was released only in Japan in October 1980. Alongside Lunar Rescue (1979), it was developed as a follow-up to Space Invaders (1978) by its designer Tomohiro Nishikado and his team, to which it is a spin-off of, but was relatively unsuccessful compared to its predecessor. It was released outside Japan for the first time as part of Space Invaders Invincible Collection.

Hamster Corporation released the game as part of their Arcade Archives series for the Nintendo Switch and PlayStation 4, as well as their Arcade Archives 2 series for the Nintendo Switch 2, PlayStation 5 and Xbox Series X/S in July 2026.

== Gameplay ==
The player attempts to shoot insect cyborgs attempting to invade a planet while riding on meteors. The cyborgs can shoot beams on the meteor or jump to the ground, which renders them defenseless when airborne, but allowing them to land causes them to build a spaceship piece by piece. After a number of aliens have landed, the completed spaceship launches and can kill the player with high-speed laser beams in quick succession. A tally is counted each time a spaceship is launched, regardless if the player kills it or is killed.
