= Arkanoid vs. Space Invaders =

2017 mobile game

Arkanoid vs Space Invaders
- App Store icon
- Developer: Taito
- Publishers: JP: Taito; WW: Square Enix
- Director: Nanoha Hata
- Producer: Nikkou Yamashita
- Designers: Taiki Yoneda; Nanoha Hata; Teppei Moriwaki
- Programmers: Teppei Moriwaki; Taiki Yoneda
- Artists: Nanoha Hata; Ken Ninomiya; Tetsuyoshi Yamaji
- Writer: Daiki Tsutsui
- Composers: Hirokazu Koshio; Shohei Tsuchiya
- Series: Arkanoid; Space Invaders
- Engine: Unity
- Platforms: Android, iOS, Nintendo Switch
- Release: May 17, 2017
- Genres: Block breaker, Shoot'em up
- Mode: Single-player

Arkanoid vs Space Invaders (Note: Japanese: アルカノイド vs スペースインベーダー, Hepburn: Arukanoido Basasu Supēsu Inbēdā) is a paid mobile game developed by Taito and published by Taito in Japan and Square Enix worldwide. As the name suggests, it is a crossover between Arkanoid and Space Invaders and has gameplay elements adapted from both games. The game was released without any prior announcement by Square Enix internationally on May 17, 2017. It was re-released on Nintendo Switch and PlayStation 4 as part of Space Invaders Invincible Collection and Space Invaders Forever.

== Gameplay ==
The game includes elements borrowed from Space Invaders and Arkanoid. The player maneuvers the Vaus spacecraft along the blue region located at the bottom of the screen, and must deflect a ball at a formation of bricks and Space Invaders aliens. The player will need to avoid fire from the enemy aliens, although the player can deflect the shots at them. The goal of each stage is to destroy the formation of bricks as well as the aliens, and the player moves forward to the next stage once this goal has been completed. The player travels through several different worlds, with each world containing four stages. In the final stage, the player must defeat a final boss before moving on. Once a world has been completed, the player will acquire a random power-up in the form of characters representing older Taito properties, such as Bubble Bobble, Darius and Psychic Force.

== Taito characters ==
Year	Characters	Origin
1982	Soldier	Front Line
1983	Spy	Elevator Action
1983	Chack'n	Chack'n Pop
1983	Monsta	Chack'n Pop
1985	Reika	Time Gal
1985	Kage	The Legend of Kage
1985	Ptolemy	The Fairyland Story
1986	Bub	Bubble Bobble
1986	Bob	Bubble Bobble
1986	Drunk	Bubble Bobble
1986	Sayo-chan	KiKi KaiKai
1987	Bubby	Rainbow Islands
1987	Kunoichi	The Ninja Warriors
1987	Ninja	The Ninja Warriors
1987	Proco	Darius
1987	Great Thing	Darius
1988	Nancy	Chase H.Q.
1988	Tiki	The NewZealand Story
1990	Sonic Blast Man	Sonic Blast Man
1991	Zac	Pu·Li·Ru·La
1993	Lufia	Lufia & the Fortress of Doom
1995	Tetsu-chan	Densha de Go!
1995	Burn Griffiths	Psychic Force
1995	Emilio Michaelov	Psychic Force
1995	Keith Evans	Psychic Force
1995	Wendy Ryan	Psychic Force
1997	Patra-co	Cleopatra Fortune
1997	Kaori Tachibana	Kirameki Star Road
1997	C-mond	Puchi Carat
2005	Mr. ESC	Exit
2005	Nico	Spica Adventure
2009	Riga Pratica	Dariusburst
2009	Ti2	Dariusburst
2009	Iron Fossil	Dariusburst
2016	Linka	Groove Coaster 3: Link Fever
2016	Nadia Vivie	Arkanoid vs. Space Invaders
2016	Niko Kanzaki	Arkanoid vs. Space Invaders
2017	Yume	Groove Coaster 3EX: Dream Party

== Reception ==
Reception

Aggregate score
Aggregator	Score
Metacritic	85/100

Review scores
Publication	Score
Destructoid	9/10
Gamezebo	4.5/5
Pocket Gamer	3.5/5
TouchArcade	4.5/5

Arkanoid vs. Space Invaders received positive reviews from critics, with reviews praising the amalgamation of Arkanoid and Space Invaders, and ditching the free-to-play model of mobile applications. The game currently has an 85/100 score on Metacritic. Eli Hodapp of TouchArcade states that "the Arkanoid and Space Invaders universes have been duct taped together in a way that actually works quite well" and that it is "a super-solid brick breaker with an interesting twist and no freemium shenanigans". Chris Shilling of Waypoint describes the game as "Crisp and colorful with an energetic EDM soundtrack, Arkanoid vs. Space Invaders is a fizzy, addictive treat—like a bag of cola bottles but with slightly more nutritional value, and all for roughly the price of a London pint". Jennifer Allen of Gamezebo commented by saying that "Arkanoid and Space Invaders is one of those perfectly shrewd moves that you had no idea could work so well until, well, it did. Partly skills based and partly a puzzle game, it's a delightful combination of two iconic classics. Even better, you won't have to suffer the scourge of in-app purchases to enjoy it". However, she did criticise the boss battles by stating that they "are somewhat lackluster, never quite fulfilling their potential". Harry Slater of Pocket Gamer described Arkanoid vs. Space Invaders as "a mash up of two of Taito's old arcade franchises. And it's actually pretty interesting. There's bouncing, there are blocks, there are waves of alien invaders trying to destroy the cosmos. While that might sound like a silly mish mash, there's actually a decent amount of cohesion here". CJ Andrissen of Destructoid praised the game by stating that it is "one of the best mobile games of the year" and that "there is just so much game here to enjoy and with no ads, no microtransactions, and no need to always be connected to the internet, Arkanoid vs. Space Invaders is missing most of the red flags people wave when dismissing the mobile marketplace. It isn't the best version of Space Invaders out there but it is the best version of Arkanoid currently available".
