= Sonic Blast Man II =

1994 video game

- Developer: Taito (Note: With assistance from I.T.L.)
- Publisher: Taito
- Producer: Tomohiro Nishikado
- Series: Sonic Blast Man
- Platform: Super Nintendo Entertainment System
- Release: JP: March 18, 1994; NA: November 1994
- Genre: Beat 'em up
- Modes: Single-player, multiplayer

Sonic Blast Man II (Note: Japanese: ソニックブラストマンII, Hepburn: Sonikkuburasutoman Tsū) is a beat 'em up video game developed and published by Taito for the Super Nintendo Entertainment System in 1994.

== Gameplay ==
Sonic Blast Man II is a sequel to the arcade game Sonic Blast Man. More gameplay options are added, including new playable characters "Sonia" and "Captain Choyear", and two-player modes.

== Reception ==
Reception

Review scores
Publication	Score
Computer and Video Games	83/100
Electronic Gaming Monthly	7.6/10
Game Informer	5/10
GamePro	3.325/5
Next Generation	2/5
Nintendo Power	3.4/5
Joypad	83%
Super Console	85/100
Super GamePower	3.8/5
Video Games	48%

Next Generation reviewed the game, rating it two stars out of five, and stated that "it's not a rotten game, but there's nothing here to make you sit up and take notice". The staff of Electronic Gaming Monthly gave the game positive reviews stating that "if you liked the first Blast Man, then you will definitely enjoy this second round".
