= Arkanoid Plus! =

2009 video game

- Developer: Taito
- Publishers: JP: Taito; WW: Square Enix
- Series: Arkanoid
- Platform: Wii
- Release: JP: May 26, 2009; EU: August 21, 2009; NA: September 28, 2009
- Genre: Block breaker
- Modes: Single-player, multiplayer

Arkanoid Plus! (Japanese: アルカノイド Plus!, Hepburn: Arukanoido Plus!) is a block breaker game released for WiiWare on September 28, 2009.

== Gameplay ==
Arkanoid Plus! features similar gameplay to the original Arkanoid. The player controls the spaceship "VAUS", from which a ball at the beginning of each round, and the player must then move the ship left and right to hit the ball and keep it in play as it bounces up, down and all around the screen smashing through and ricocheting off of the bricks it touches. The goal is for the player to keep the ball in play long enough for it to smash all the bricks which will complete the level and allow the player to progress to the next one.

== Reception ==
Reception

Aggregate score
Aggregator	Score
Metacritic	71/100

Review scores
Publication	Score
IGN	8.0/10
Nintendo Life	7/10

According to review aggregator Metacritic, Arkanoid Plus! holds an average score of 71/100, indicating "mixed or average reviews".
