= Pu·Li·Ru·La =

1991 arcade game

- Cover of the FM Towns Marty version
- Developers: Arcade: Taito; Sega Saturn & PlayStation Port: Goo!
- Publishers: Arcade: Taito; Sega Saturn & PlayStation Port: Xing Entertainment
- Designer: Mt. Mihara B. E. Umakboh
- Artists: Zak Munn; Masami Kikuchi; Mutter Tomy; E. Bang De Boo. M
- Composer: Kazuko Umino
- Platforms: Arcade; FM Towns Marty; Sega Saturn; PlayStation; PlayStation 2
- Release: Arcade: JP: 1991; NA: November, 1991; Saturn & PlayStation: JP: August 28, 1997; PlayStation 2: JP: July 28, 2005
- Genre: Beat 'em up
- Modes: Single-player, multiplayer
- Arcade system: Taito F2 System (Expanded hardware)

Pu·Li·Ru·La (プリルラ) is a 1991 arcade game released by Taito. The game was later ported to the FM Towns Marty, Sega Saturn, PlayStation, and PlayStation 2 in Japan. The PS1 and Saturn versions are known as Pu·Li·Ru·La Arcade Gears. The PS2 version is part of a compilation called Taito Memories (Volume 1), but omitted from the international release of Taito Legends. Pu·Li·Ru·La is known for its elaborate anime art style and bizarre enemy characters.

== Story ==
Pu·Li·Ru·La takes place in Radishland, a land where time is kept correctly flowing with a time key. However, "a bad man appeared and stole the time key to stop the time flow. The towns were attacked one by one, the time flow was stopped and they received damage", as the English translation explains. Zac and Mel, the playable characters, are requested by an old man to defend their town. The old man also gives the children a "magic stick" to fight with.

== Gameplay ==
Pu·Li·Ru·La is a basic beat 'em up action game. Player 1 controls Zac and Player 2 controls Mel (who is based on Little Bo Peep). Both characters are identical control-wise. The flow of the game consists of fighting through enemies until the player reaches the boss at the end of the area. When enemies are hit, they turn into animals and run off the screen. The player is awarded points if they walk into the animals.

== Release and legacy ==
Japanese version

The original Japanese version of Pu·Li·Ru·La featured an area with huge female legs sticking out of the wall with a door in the middle of them, where pink elephants would occasionally escape. This section was removed in the international release. A stage from Bubble Symphony is based on Pu·Li·Ru·La. The enemies and boss characters are from this game.

A limited-edition soundtrack was released for Pu·Li·Ru·La by Pony Canyon/Scitron on July 17, 1992. Zac has also appeared as an assist character in Arkanoid vs. Space Invaders for iOS and Android in 2016.

=== Other media ===
- Zac and Mel make a cameo in the episode 17 from High Score Girl.

== Reception ==
French magazine Game Fan praised the game.
