= Space Invaders Infinity Gene =

2008 video game

- The game's logo includes the crab alien invader.
- Developer: Taito
- Publishers: Taito; Square Enix (PS3, 360, Android)
- Director: Reisuke Ishida
- Designer: Reisuke Ishida
- Artist: Reisuke Ishida
- Composer: Hirokazu Koshio
- Series: Space Invaders
- Platforms: Mobile phone, iOS, Xbox 360, PlayStation 3, Android
- Release: Mobile phone: JP: December 17, 2008; iOS: WW: July 28, 2009; PlayStation 3: NA: September 14, 2010; WW: September 15, 2010; Xbox 360: WW: September 15, 2010; Android: WW: September 7, 2011
- Genre: Shoot 'em up
- Mode: Single-player

Space Invaders Infinity Gene (Note: Japanese: スペースインベーダー インフィニティジーン, Hepburn: Supēsu Inbēdā Infiniti Jīn) is a 2008 shoot 'em up video game developed and published by Taito initially for mobile phones. An installment of the Space Invaders series, the game blends the series' classic characters and gameplay with the concept of evolution. As the game progresses, new game mechanics become available to the player, modeling iterative changes to the series and genre. In addition to the normal collection of stages, it features challenge and bonus modes of play.

The game was directed by Reisuke Ishida, who sought to showcase the series' evolution and pique interest in the shoot 'em up genre. Several elements drew inspiration from previous Taito arcade shoot 'em ups as an homage to the genre. The director implemented "retro-futuristic" audiovisuals, which drew heavily from electronic music. Infinity Gene's music was created by Taito's band, Zuntata, with Hirokazu Koshio handling the sound design.

Soon after releasing for feature phones in Japan, the company published iPhone and iPod Touch versions in 2009; an iPad version titled Space Invaders Infinity Gene HD followed in 2010. The iOS apps feature touch-screen controls and a music mode that generates stages from songs in the device's music library. Square Enix released the game for the PlayStation 3 and Xbox 360 consoles in September 2010. In addition to the music mode, the console versions feature updated visuals with high definition and 3D graphics. An Android version was released in September 2011. The game was removed from the Apple App Store in 2017, and Taito released a remake titled Space Invaders Infinity Gene Evolve (Note: スペースインベーダー インフィニティジーン エボルブ, Supēsu Inbēdā Infiniti Jīn Eborubu) exclusively for Apple Arcade in 2025.

The iPhone release won several awards and was met with universal critical acclaim. Common points of praise included the touch controls, minimalist aesthetics, soundtrack, and music library integration. Criticism focused on enemies being obscured by the monochromatic visuals. The console versions were rated lower than the iOS releases but were received positively, specifically towards the changes related to adapting the game to consoles. Infinity Gene's success impacted Taito's approach to mobile phone games. Music from the game was included in the company's later projects.

== Gameplay ==
The player-controlled small space ship (center) fires at the boss, a large space ship (top), as smaller invader aliens fly around. Game statistics (score, chains, and lives) are tracked in the corners of the screen.

Space Invaders Infinity Gene is a shoot 'em up video game with a theme of evolution. The player controls a ship as it battles against various invader aliens and large space ships. The first stage is based on the original 1978 Space Invaders arcade game, where rows of alien invaders descend towards a laser cannon that can move only horizontally. After completing it, a Charles Darwin quote about evolution displays before progressing to the next level. As the player advances, new gameplay mechanics become available. Completing levels and obtaining high scores fill a gene gauge; completely filling the gauge triggers an "evolution" that unlocks new game elements. Unlocked elements include vertical movement, options for weapon upgrades, background music, and other aspects that expand the game.

Weapon upgrades include "Lock-On", which changes the projectiles' path towards targets, and "Gravity", which explodes into a vortex that attracts nearby enemies to cause them damage. Additional abilities that can be unlocked include chaining enemy kills to increase the score and "Nagoya shooting", (Note: 名古屋撃ち, Nagoya uchi) (Note: The term "Nagoya shooting" originated as a gameplay exploit of a software bug in the original 1978 Space Invaders arcade.) which allows the player to attack enemies at close range without taking damage for additional points. During the game, the player can shoot the classic mystery ships to release power-ups, which increase their selected weapon's effectiveness when collected. The power-ups scatter if the player's ship is destroyed. As the game progresses, enemies become larger and bosses appear at the end of levels. Adversaries' movements and attacks become more complex in later stages.

Beyond the normal method of play, the game has additional modes: Challenge Mode, which features 99 challenge stages; Bonus Mode, which has levels that are unlocked through evolution; and Music Mode, in which levels are generated from music tracks found on the player's device. The iOS and Android versions feature touch controls; the player moves their finger along the screen to change the position of the ship, which continually fires automatically. The console releases use a gamepad to control the ship. Scores are tracked via online leaderboards.

== Development ==
Space Invaders Infinity Gene was developed by Taito, with Reisuke Ishida as the director. He had previously worked primarily on Taito's mobile phone games, such as Trance Pinball, a pinball game with musical elements. A fan of the Space Invaders series and shooting games, several of the director's previous mobile games included Space Invaders characters. Infinity Gene was developed for the 30th anniversary of the original game. Ishida's boss approached him about submitting a proposal, which was ultimately approved. He was aided by Taito programmers, who created the game's script converters and data compression tools used during development, and sound designer Hirokazu Koshio. The company's band, Zuntata, created the game's music.

"I wanted players to see the DNA of Space Invaders in every scene, so I loaded the game with allusions to the original game, tying them both together."

— Director Reisuke Ishida on the game's design

Because Taito was also developing Space Invaders Extreme at the time, Ishida wanted Infinity Gene to be as different as possible and decided on an unconventional and experimental approach. Additionally, the company chose to release a mobile phone game since Extreme was releasing on consoles. Rather than be about defending the planet from invading aliens, the director wanted the premise to be about the Space Invaders series as a whole. In retrospect, he considered the game to be the "crystallization of [his] thoughts and feelings about Space Invaders and its monumental role in gaming history."

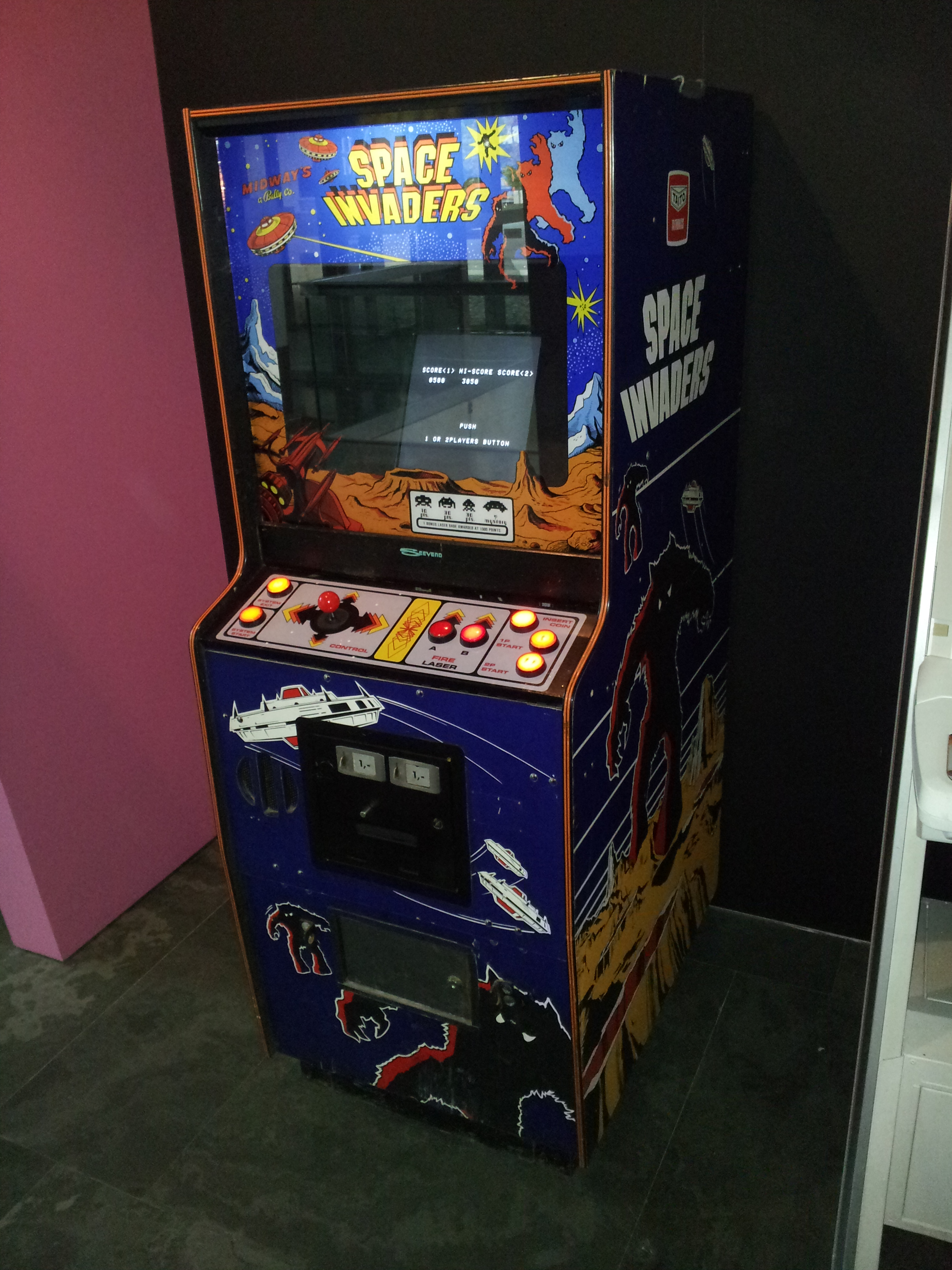
The developers drew inspiration from the original Space Invaders arcade game (pictured) as well as its sequels and remakes.

To achieve mass appeal, Ishida considered multiple player perspectives during the design process. While he believed the invader characters had become iconic, he questioned how many people in the then-current generation had played the original and what are players' impressions from their first experiences. Realizing that younger generations may be familiar with the characters but not the gameplay, Ishida wanted to convey the evolution of Space Invaders and made that the game's theme. The director also felt this would be a good way to introduce the original game to younger players. He then researched evolution in general and integrated his findings into the game; for example, stage names and terminology reference evolution and the menus resemble phylogenetic trees. The development team selected the name "Infinity Gene" to invoke the idea of continuous evolution in order to reflect the overall theme. Ishida hoped that showcasing the series' advancement from its original form to a modern one would increase interest in the shoot 'em up genre.

=== Gameplay design ===
Ishida considered the evolution aspect of the gameplay the most challenging and critical aspect of development. The initial plan featured branching evolutionary paths. The director contemplated different approaches with this design, such as allowing the player to choose their own path or automatically selecting abilities for the player as the game progressed, but felt they disrupted the game's tempo and added unneeded stress onto the player. Because he felt players would be unsatisfied with only a subset of abilities, he allowed the player to choose options after they are unlocked, which he believed had wider appeal. New features are gradually made accessible as the game progresses to provide motivation and avoid overwhelming casual players.

The director was inspired by many games in the shoot 'em up genre. He also incorporated elements from Taito shooting arcade games: the 1987 Darius, the 1991 Metal Black, which he noted also has an element of evolution, and the 1994 RayForce as well as its sequels. He felt the Ray series balanced gameplay with appealing graphics very well and drew inspiration from enemy algorithms, background scrolling mechanics, shooting weapons, and the visuals.

Ishida avoided the "bullet hell" (Note: 弾幕, danmaku; lit. 'barrage or bullet curtain') style of gameplay because he felt it would have limited the game's audience. He wanted Infinity Gene to serve as an introductory shooting game and believed that the intense difficulty of bullet hell games discouraged beginners. Instead, Ishida aimed to capture the "flashiness" of the genre in the game's visuals. He believed a very visually-oriented game would appeal to both non-gamers and gamers. Furthermore, Ishida believed that providing exaggerated reactions create a fulfilling experience for players. To increase the "fun and exhilaration", he wanted the game to only look like it has extremely intense battles. The staff applied this to the different game modes, with an emphasis on the Music Mode.

=== Audiovisual design ===
In designing the gameplay, Ishida felt that simply combining the classic elements of Space Invaders with newer ones from Trance Pinball would not resonate well with contemporary games and decided that updated visuals were necessary to successfully mix the elements. The director also handled Infinity Gene's graphical design and applied an atmosphere similar to Trance Pinball. With "new, yet nostalgic" and "retro-futuristic" as the game's key design concepts, Ishida aimed to have the game's lineage recognizable within the graphics and included the original invader characters in most every stage. He also worried that excluding the characters would distance the game too far from the franchise; however, Ishida omitted them from the final levels of the stages to give those levels a different feel. Visual inspiration was also drawn from music videos for techno songs. During development, Ishida experimented with bright colors for the enemies. However, he felt the visuals looked too similar to other games in the genre and pursued a monochromatic design to distinguish the game from others.

As a fan of rhythm games, he wanted to fuse the musical and visual aspects of the game and include direct interaction between the two—a general goal Ishida had since joining Taito around ten years prior. From the beginning, the director wanted the game to have a "solid, cool techno sound" and had electronic music in mind when planning the aesthetics. He worked with Koshio regularly to balance the music and gave directions, which in retrospect, Ishida felt put a lot of pressure on the sound designer. Because of the game's nontraditional story, Ishida instructed Koshio to eschew melodies, which he deemed too emotional for the design, in favor of more digital sounds. The sound designer used FM synthesis, which was widespread technology in mobile phones at the time, to generate the sound effects. Additionally, Koshio felt such sounds captured the retro feel of the original Space Invaders arcade and avoided making sound effects realistic. In keeping with the evolution theme, each song has three versions that begin as beep-based music and graduate to contemporary electronica.

== Release and ports ==
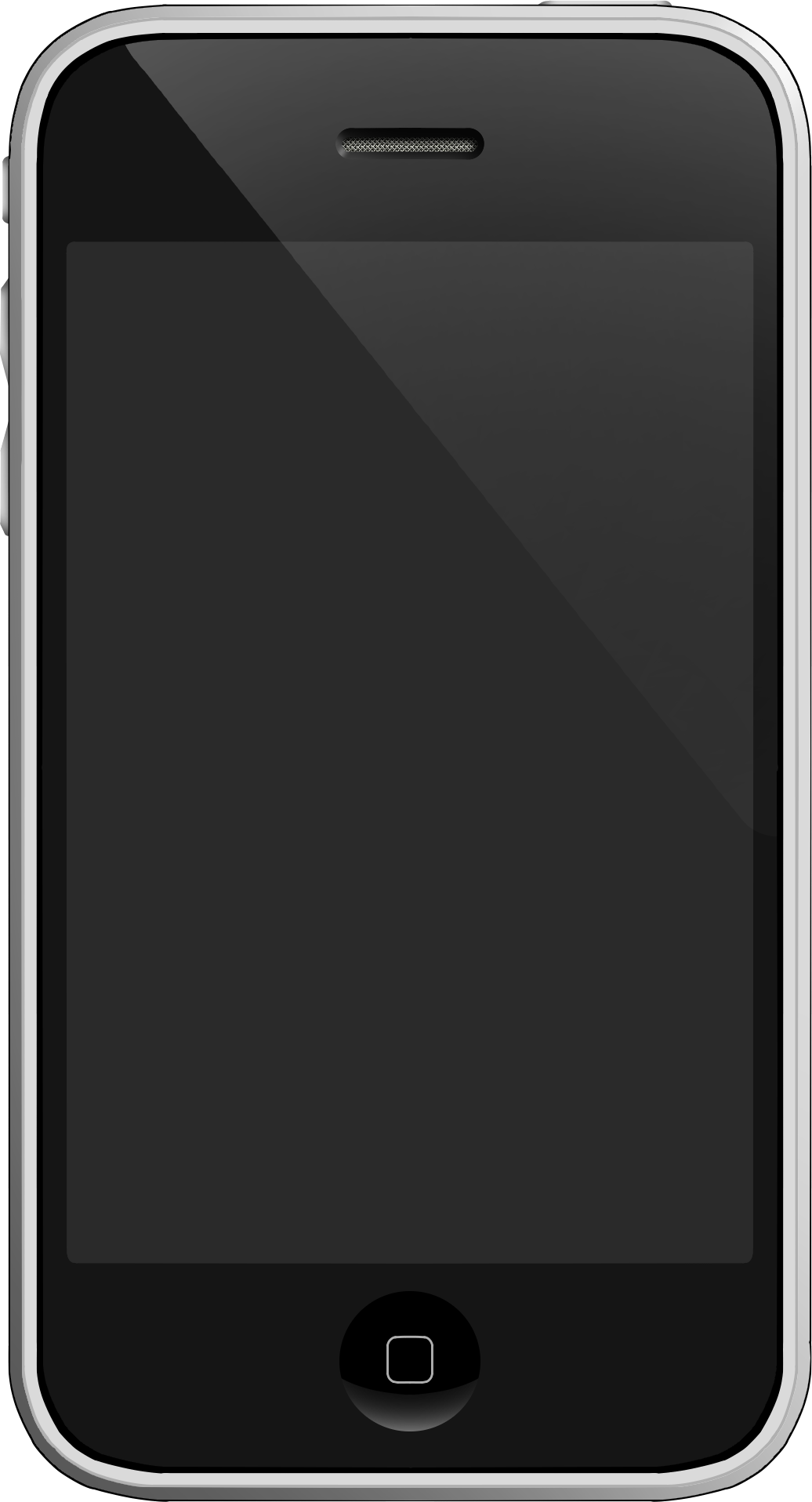
iPhone 3GS

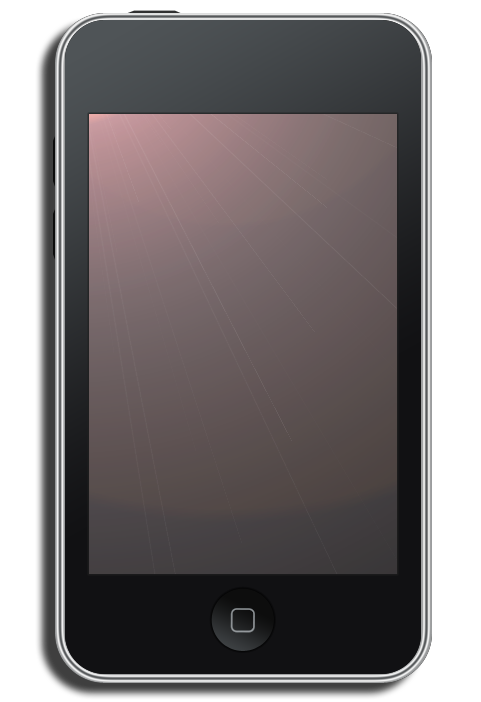
2nd generation iPod Touch

The developers took advantage of the iPhone and iPod Touch devices' touchscreen controls and access to the user's music library.

Space Invaders Infinity Gene was originally distributed in Japan as a Java game on feature mobile phones in 2008 as part of the original's 30th anniversary celebration. Taito released it via the i-mode and Yahoo! Keitai (Note: Yahoo!ケータイ, Yahoo! Kētai; lit. 'Yahoo! Cell Phone or Yahoo! Mobile Phone') mobile internet services on December 17, 2008. The corporation soon after released the game on iPhone and iPod Touch devices on July 28, 2009. Unfamiliar with the Apple App Store market, it did not set high sales goals at the time.

The director considered developing the control system for the iPhone a challenge. Ishida believed that providing the player with "full control over their ship/character" was vital to success. He experimented with different schemes and considered providing options, such as tilt and tap controls, to the player. Ishida settled on using only touch and drag controls, which he felt were the most intuitive, user-friendly, and stress-free. A music mode was also added that created stages based on songs from the user's device. The mode used a feature of iPhone OS 3 that allowed access to the device's music library.

At the beginning of 2010, the developer released the 2.0 version of the iOS game, which included additional stages and new features—leaderboards, achievements, and social network posting—via OpenFeint integration. This was part of a larger effort by Taito to use OpenFeint in its iOS games. The company released a free demo version titled Space Invaders Infinity Gene Lite at the same time. Taito later distributed the Lite version via DeNA's Mobage service in Japan on September 7, 2011, and included new exclusive stages. A year after originally releasing on the App Store, the corporation updated it to version 3.0 in July 2010, introducing a few options and paid downloadable content. The paid content packs were named after Taito arcade shoot 'em ups—Darius, Night Striker, and Metal Black—and featured elements that pay homage to the games, such as remixes of their music.

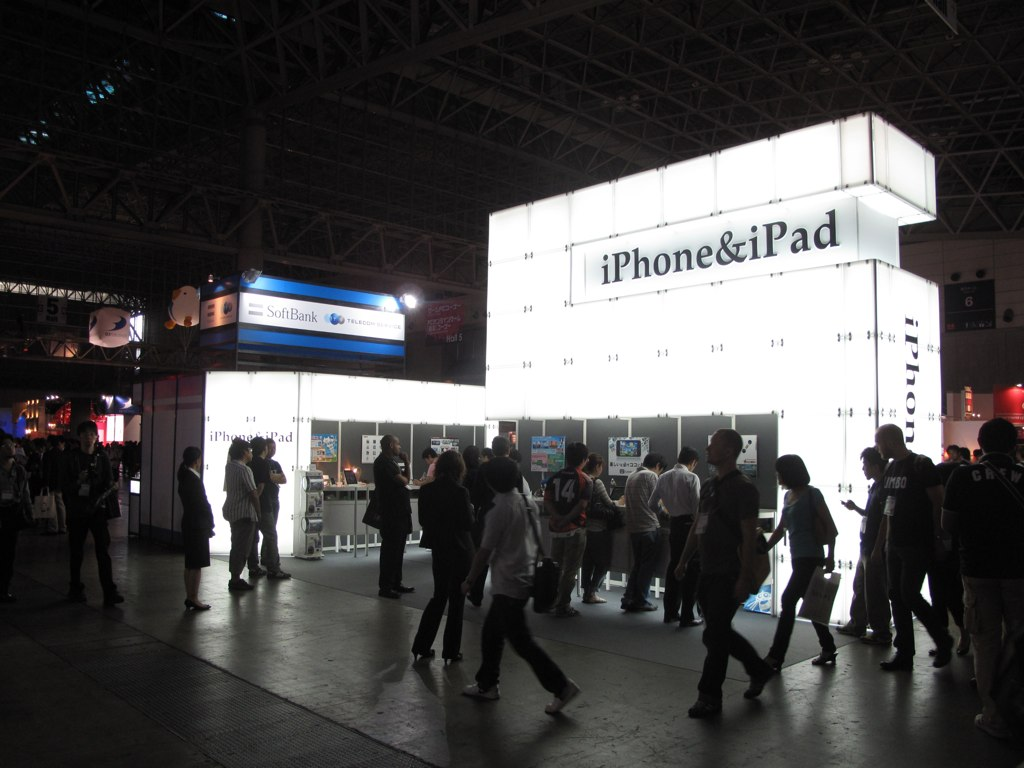
The iPad version was announced at the 2010 Tokyo Game Show. A playable demonstration was available at the Apple device kiosk (pictured).

At the 2010 Tokyo Game Show in September, Ishida announced that version 3.5 would soon be available for the iPad and feature high-definition graphics, Retina display support, and a frame rate of 60 frames per second. A demo of the iPad version was available for attendees to play. Following a digital release on consoles, word of the announcement spread to Western regions; the iPad version, titled Space Invaders Infinity Gene HD, released in 2010. Following the release of iOS 11 in 2017, the game was delisted from the App Store.

Taito later created a remake titled Space Invaders Infinity Gene Evolve in April 2025. Released exclusively on iOS devices via Apple Arcade, the remake features a new "Bullet Hell" mode and new weapon upgrades. The player is able to switch between the original style of play and bullet hell, which is more challenging while providing opportunities to obtain higher scores. From May to September 2025, Taito released five updates that expanded the game.

Square Enix, Taito's parent company, published Infinity Gene to the Android Market for Android mobile phones on September 7, 2011. Taito promoted the Android version at the 2011 Tokyo Game Show. The company updated the Android app in April 2018 to support the UltraMotion sync feature of the Razer Phone.

Taito released the game's soundtrack in Japan via iTunes in August 2009. The songs were available as an album and individually. In February 2011, the publisher announced a second album titled Space Invaders Infinity Gene –Evolutional Theory–, which released on April 13, 2011. It features 25 tracks from the iOS and console versions of the game and was distributed again through iTunes. Square Enix also concurrently released the album on compact disc, which included a character sticker sheet, as well as digitally via Amazon MP3 and mora. Zuntata released a few songs on its websites ahead of the album's publication. The following summer, Japanese website Famitsu App held a Twitter contest with the CD as the prize.

=== Home consoles ===
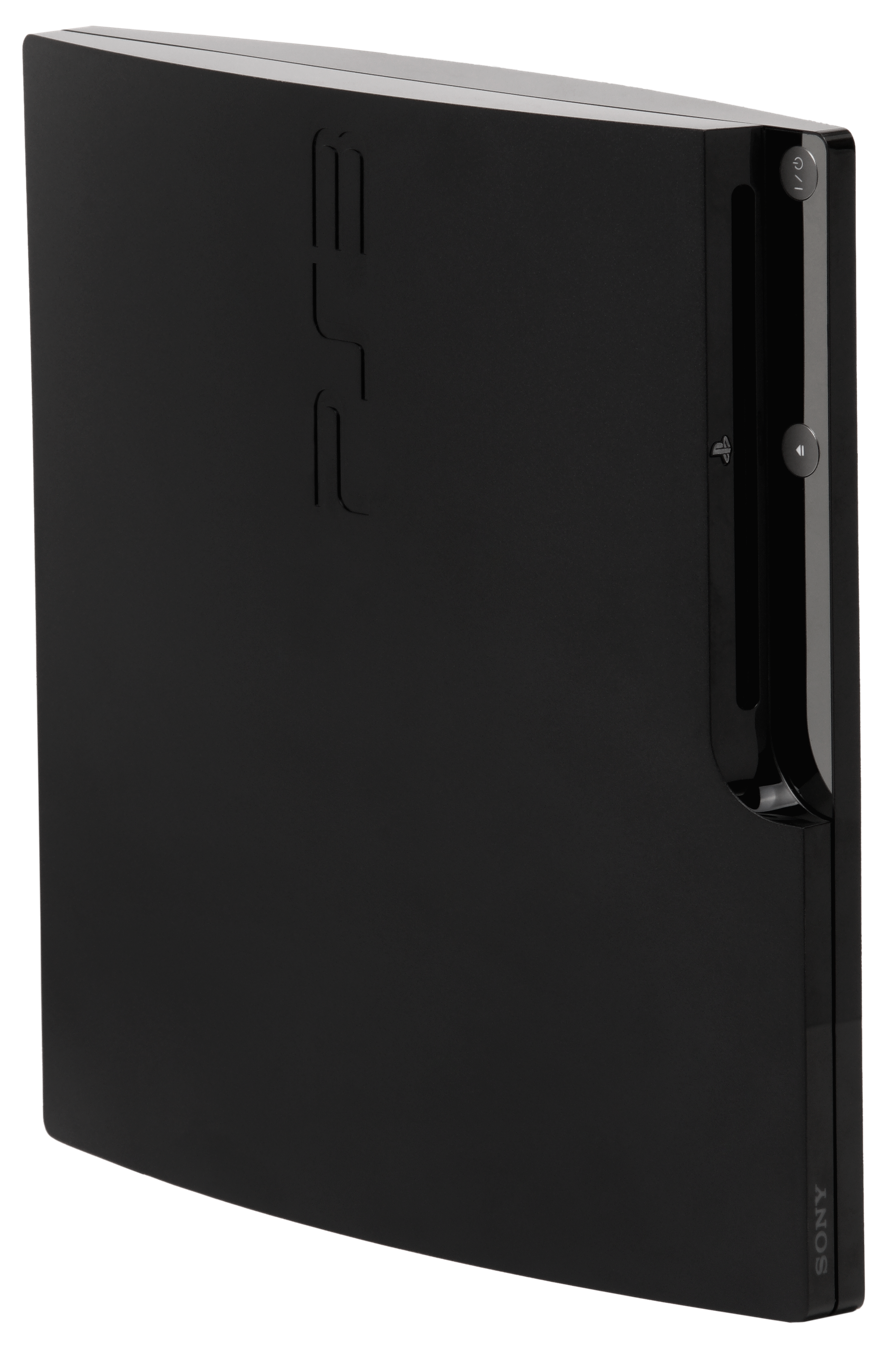
PlayStation 3 Slim

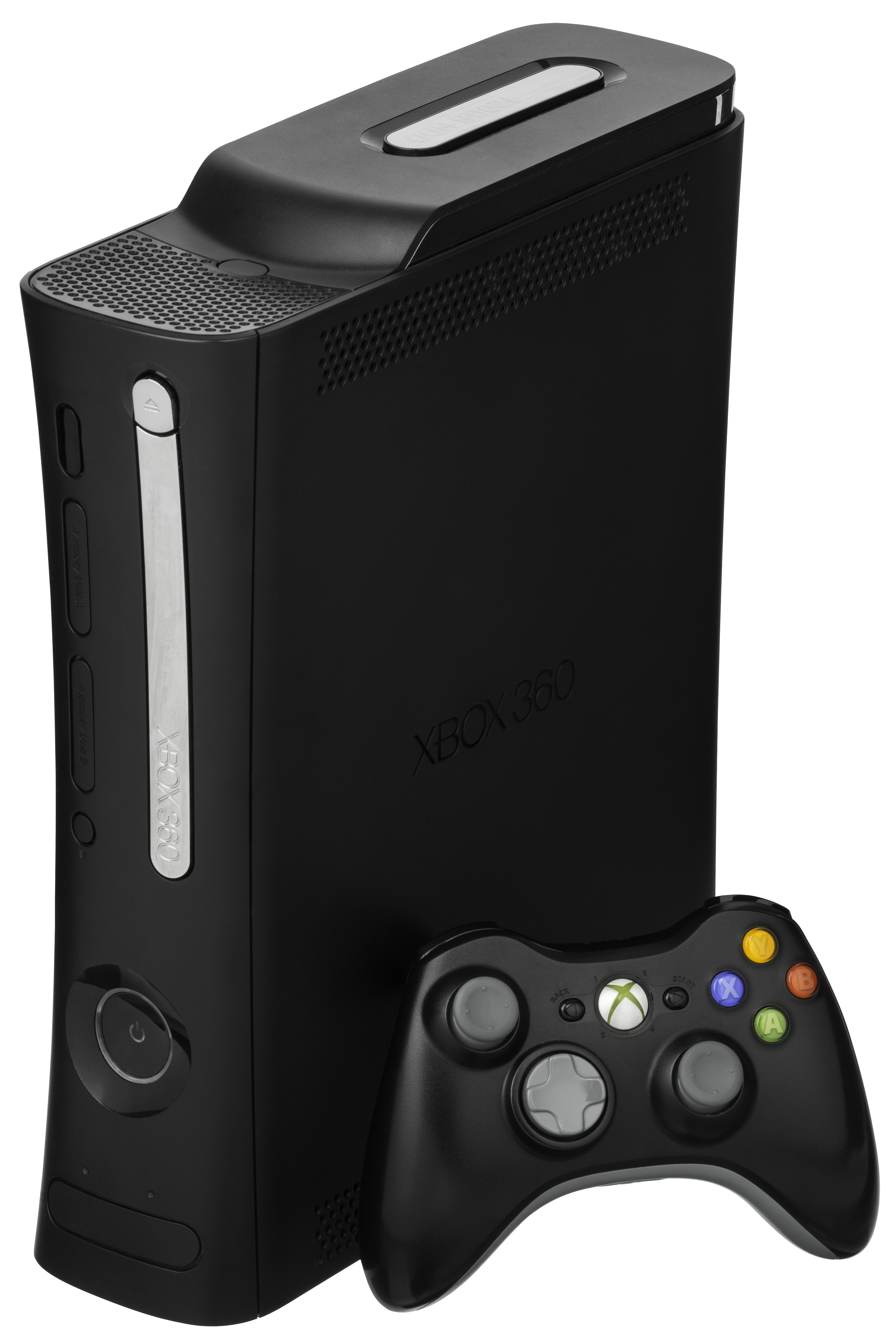
Xbox 360 Elite

The game was distributed via Sony and Microsoft's digital services on their respective consoles.

Weekly Famitsu reported in June 2010 that the game would be released on the Xbox 360 and PlayStation 3 in Japan, which prompted IGN's Daemon Hatfield to speculate that the developer would announce a United States release at the E3 trade show in June 2010. Soon after, Square Enix announced its intent to digitally release the game in North America and promote it at E3. At the end of August 2010, the company launched a promotional website.

Infinity Gene released digitally on the PlayStation and Xbox 360 consoles in mid-September 2010. A demo was also available on the PlayStation Store. The gameplay was adapted to a horizontal 16:9 aspect ratio screen, and 3D graphics were integrated into the visuals. The developers sought to maintain the gameplay when creating the 3D stages in order to avoid players feeling like they were playing a different game. A music visualizer was added to dynamically change the stage backgrounds in order to create a connection with the audio, which Koshio struggled to implement. During development, the results were sometimes overly flashy or too simple, which hindered the player's ability to see and dampened the excitement, respectively. Koshio had difficulty finding a balance because the team could not observe the results without testing with the music. New songs for boss stages and sound effects were added as well.

Square Enix released extra stages as downloadable content via Sony and Microsoft's online services in October 2010. Second and third packs of stages were released the following month. Microsoft announced in February 2017 that the game would be backwards compatible with the Xbox One console. In January 2022, Microsoft provided Infinity Gene temporarily free to Xbox Live Gold subscribers via its Games With Gold program.

== Reception ==
Reception

Aggregate score
Aggregator	Score		
Aggregator	iOS	PS3	Xbox 360
Metacritic	91/100	80/100	80/100

Review scores
Publication	Score		
Publication	iOS	PS3	Xbox 360
1Up.com	N/A	A−	A−
Destructoid	9.5/10	8/10	8/10
Eurogamer	9/10	N/A	N/A
GameSpot	N/A	8/10	8/10
IGN	8.7/10	N/A	8/10
Retro Gamer	91%	N/A	90%
iPhone Games Directory	5/5	N/A	N/A

Awards
Publication	Award
IGN	iPhone Game of the Month (July 2009)
Gamasutra	Best iPhone Game of 2009
Mobile Content Forum	Excellence Award (2010)

Space Invaders Infinity Gene's gameplay and premise received generally positive comments. Retro Gamer's Darran Jones praised the short stages as well as the musical elements and urged readers to download it. Writing for IGN, Levi Buchanan called the game one of his favorite Space Invader variants. In addition to the soundtrack, he praised the short stages for encouraging replays and experimentation. Eurogamer's Simon Parker expressed admiration for Infinity Gene's concept and called it "the crowning achievement" of the series. IGN's Colin Moriarty was complimentary towards the game's reinvention of Space Invaders and the accompanying aesthetics. He summarized his review calling it a good value for the price. Carolyn Petit of GameSpot considered the level design and gameplay balance as highlights. Tomohiro Nishikado, the creator of the original Space Invaders, also praised the game, calling it fast-paced. He felt the simple gameplay made it very accessible for someone his age (Note: Nishikado was born on March 31, 1944, and was 66 when the interview was published.) and expressed gratitude that Infinity Gene shared the same design ethos as the original: a shooting game everyone can play.

The reward system, specifically the weapon evolutions, and Music Mode drew frequent compliments from the video game press. Buchanan applauded Taito for implementing the reward system, stating that the rewards encourage players to try different tactics with the weapon options on subsequent playthroughs. Jones considered it a positive. Petit felt the system balanced challenges and rewards well but criticized the rewards as being often disappointing. Despite this, she believed the evolutions significantly changed the game in positive ways. Reviewers praised the Music Mode for extending the game's longevity. Buchanan encouraged players to use the mode with their own music library for new experiences. Parker commended the mode for increasing the game's replay value. Although he called it a "cool" feature, Topher Cantler of Destructoid felt the high quality of the game's music might preclude players from trying the mode.

The visuals and aesthetics were generally well received. Several critics positively compared Infinity Gene to the 2001 Rez. Reviewers also stated the visuals evoked memories of the 1982 film Tron and the 1983 Star Wars arcade game. Parker praised the minimalist aesthetics, commenting that the blocky monochrome sprites fit the Space Invaders series without lessening their impact. Cantler described the visuals as a "treat" for blending the classic look of the original Space Invaders with later shooting games. Petit lauded the aesthetics, calling the game a "thing of mesmerizing minimalist beauty" and the juxtaposition of the monochromatic enemies against the vividly colorful backgrounds "eye-catching". Buchanan commended the visuals, describing the aesthetics as "retro-techno". A common complaint was that the monochromatic visuals sometimes obscured enemies during gameplay. Parker noted that the enemies' bullets and those of the player are both white, which make it difficult to discern between the two during busy moments of action. Similarly, Cantler complained that the single-color aesthetics confuse the player as to which lines are enemy attacks or just benign background lines.

The soundtrack was a consistent point of praise. Cantler felt the game's music was worth the price of the app. He described it as enthralling, specifically how well the audio matched the gameplay. Petit echoed similar comments, calling the soundtrack a "terrific assortment" and praising how it perfectly accompanied the action. Chris Greening of Square Enix Music Online praised the Evolutional Theory album, calling it a demonstration of Koshio's "great command of rhythms and timbres". While he noted that not everyone would enjoy the "hard minimalistic approach", Greening felt many would appreciate the album and considered it a good value.

=== Platform responses ===
The iPhone iteration of Space Invaders Infinity Gene met with "universal acclaim" from video game journalists, according to review aggregator website Metacritic, on which the game holds a weighted average score of 91 out of 100 based on 10 reviews. Ahead of the release, Evan Shamoon of US magazine Play wrote that it is "definitely one to watch", citing its audiovisuals. A week after publication, the game was 54th on the App Store's list of top paid apps in the United States. The next week, Infinity Gene had climbed to number 28.

Jones lauded the mobile game, calling it a "stunning shooter" catered to the iPhone. Cantler expressed excitement that the game was released outside Japan. While initially skeptical of the iOS device's potential as a gaming platform, Cantler called Infinity Gene "one of the most engaging videogame experiences [he] had in years". Writers for Imagine Publishing's iPhone Games Directory called the game an "astonishing achievement", citing the tailored experience for the Apple device. Commentators frequently drew attention to the iOS touch controls. Buchanan called the controls "smooth" and "accurate", and Cantler felt that the touch controls work well with the game. Parker agreed, stating that the game found its "true home" on the iPhone. He wrote that the automatic firing permits players to concentrate on movement and the control scheme allows for precision during challenging stages.

The iPhone release of Infinity Gene garnered awards and distinctions from organizations. Upon its release in July 2009, IGN staff named it the iPhone "Game of the Month", praising the "slick neo-retro aesthetic and a great techno-thump soundtrack." Additionally, IGN's United Kingdom staff considered it a stand out title of the year in August 2009, citing its presentation, gameplay, and music library integration. During Gamasutra's retrospective of 2009, Danny Cowan ranked it the top iPhone game of the year, citing its simple and effective control scheme. Starting in 2009, Infinity Gene was included among the best apps of the year in Apple's iTunes Rewind feature for two consecutive years in Japan. At its 2010 Mobile Project Awards, the Mobile Content Forum, a Japanese industry association, bestowed the game an "Excellence Award". Soon after releasing for Android, the editors at Famitsu App included the game on their list of recommended apps on both Android and iOS devices. Tony Mott included the game in the book 1001 Video Games You Must Play Before You Die. In praising the audiovisuals, gameplay variety, and touch controls, he described it as a "pacy mashup" of Space Invaders Extreme and Rez.

The Xbox Live Arcade and PlayStation Network versions also received positive reviews. Metacritic considers the response for both systems "generally favorable". Writing for 1UP.com, Steve Haske praised the transition to consoles, noting that the larger screen makes the game's challenges more manageable. He lauded the addition of 3D graphics, calling it "one of the most effective blends of retro and contemporary game art styles." Haske urged people to purchase Infinity Gene, including those that had previously bought the mobile release. Destructoid's Colette Bennett praised the changes to the console releases, specifically the HD graphics, game controller use, and gameplay additions. However, she acknowledged that issues with the visuals obscuring game objects and short levels from the iOS version persisted. Jones favorably compared the Xbox version to the iPhone release. He praised the additions and called it a "highly entertaining blaster".

== Legacy ==
Retro Gamer staff noted that many early ports of classic shoot 'em ups did not adequately use touch screen controls. They cited Space Invaders Infinity Gene as one of the games that demonstrated good use of the technology. Taito would later apply the touch control design to the mobile release of Dariusburst Second Prologue in 2012; while not part of the development team, Ishida provided feedback. After Infinity Gene's success on the App Store, the company set higher sales goals for Ishida's next game, Groove Coaster. Under an "Infinity Gene Project" umbrella, he developed Groove Coaster as an extension of Infinity Gene and hoped to make a third title in the project.

Music from Space Invaders Infinity Gene has been included in later Taito projects. L'ab-normal Limited, a bonus CD with the 2010 Dariusburst Remix Wonder World album, includes two tracks from Infinity Gene's soundtrack. The 2011 rhythm shooting game Music GunGun! 2 includes a medley based on Infinity Gene. A 2013 update of the Groove Coaster arcade game also features an Infinity Gene medley.
