= Space Invaders Part II =

1979 video game

- Japanese arcade flyer
- Developer: Taito
- Publishers: JP/NA: Taito; NA: Midway Manufacturing; JP: Nichibutsu (Note: As Moon Base; referred to on the title screen as Moon Base Zeta)
- Designer: Tomohiro Nishikado
- Series: Space Invaders
- Platform: Arcade
- Release: JP: July 1979; NA: November 1979
- Genre: Fixed shooter
- Modes: Single-player, multiplayer

Space Invaders Part II (Note: Japanese: スペースインベーダーパートII, Hepburn: Supēsu Inbēdā Pāto Tsu) is a 1979 fixed shooter video game developed and published by Taito for arcades. The sequel to Space Invaders (1978), the player controls a laser base that must destroy formations of descending aliens, while avoiding their projectiles. New features have been added, such as aliens that split into two when shot, an increased high score limit with the player able to save their name as initials, and short cutscenes in-between stages.

Space Invaders Part II was repurposed from excess arcade boards of Space Invaders. Tomohiro Nishikado, who designed the predecessor, returned to design Part II within two months, incorporating concepts that previously went unused. In North America, it was distributed by Midway Manufacturing as Space Invaders Deluxe.

== Gameplay ==
A screenshot of the arcade version. The player (bottom) is exchanging shots with a formation of aliens.

Space Invaders Part II is a fixed shooter with mechanics similar to its predecessor. The player controls a laser base which must eliminate all of the aliens that march down from the top of the screen, who plot to take over Earth. Aliens slowly move towards the edge of the screen and then move downward, increasing in speed as more aliens are killed. The player can protect their laser base from incoming projectiles by hiding underneath large shields, which become damaged when hit by projectiles fired by either the player or aliens. A UFO will occasionally appear at the top of the screen, which can be shot down for bonus points.

Alongside the core Space Invaders gameplay, Part II introduces several new elements. Some aliens will split into two smaller ones when they are shot. A new type of UFO may sometimes appear that flashes as it moves towards the side of the screen, which can only be shot down when it becomes visible. In later stages, UFOs have the ability to deploy additional aliens when few remain. Completing each stage will also award the player with a short cutscene, showing an alien escaping on a UFO. Stages are indicated by the number displayed on the shields.

== Development and release ==
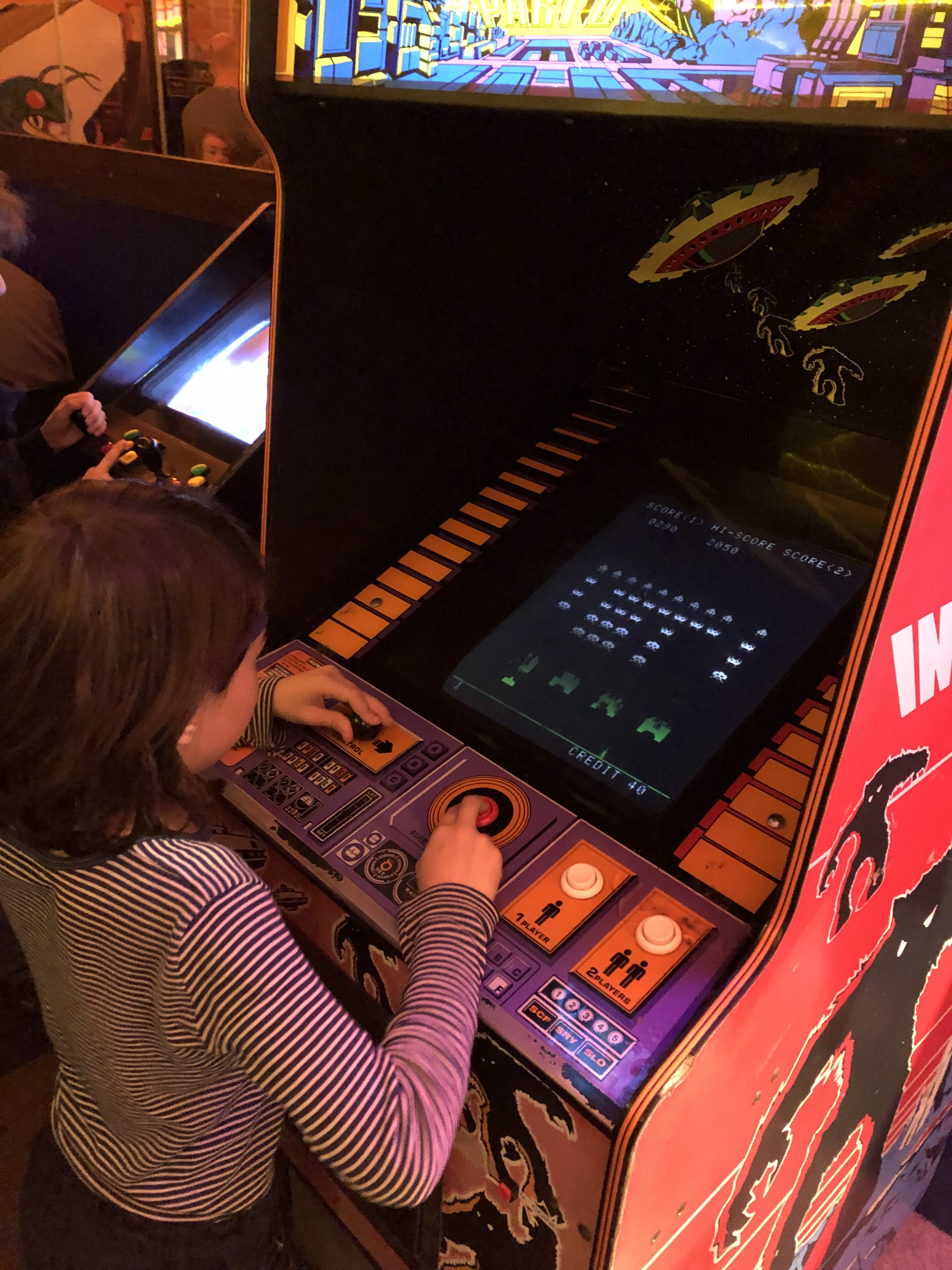
The Space Invaders Part II arcade cabinet reuses artwork from the original arcade game.

Space Invaders Part II was designed by Tomohiro Nishikado, the creator of the original Space Invaders, and was made to clear out inventory of excess Space Invaders arcade boards. While Nishikado wanted to design newer hardware to stay competitive, the original's widespread demand led Taito to support the existing hardware by creating new games compatible with it. Nishikado spent two months creating the game and incorporated unused concepts he had conceived while developing the first game. For example, the splitting aliens were omitted from Space Invaders in order to meet its release deadline.

The game was released in Japan by Taito in July 1979. In North America, it was debuted by Midway Manufacturing in November 1979 before entering mass production in January 1980. The North American release was titled Space Invaders Deluxe; however, the title screen still uses the Part II name, likely due to Taito's contract with Midway that only allowed them to make minor modifications to the game.

A Game Boy version of the game was released in 1990, which featured support for the Game Link Cable to enable multiplayer. A harder, redemption version of the game, Prize Space Invaders, was released the same year, awarding money based on how well the player did. Part II is included in the compilations Space Invaders Virtual Collection (1995), Space Invaders Anniversary (2004), Taito Memories Gekan (2005), Taito Legends (2005), Taito Legends Power-Up (2007), and Space Invaders Pocket (2007). It was ported to mobile phones in 2007 as part of Space Invaders Trilogy, bundled with the original Space Invaders and Return of the Invaders and the Nintendo Switch compilation Space Invaders Invincible Collection.

It was re-released as part of Hamster Corporation's Arcade Archives and Arcade Archives 2 series on January 1, 2026.

== Reception ==
Reception

Review scores
Publication	Score
AllGame	3/5
Cash Box	Positive

Cash Box magazine liked the game's colorful graphics and additional gameplay mechanics, saying that it would "add to the enjoyment of the most avid and skilled players." New Computer Express magazine was indifferent towards Prize Space Invaders for its high price point, although stated that its prize mechanic made this somewhat forgivable. In a 1998 retrospective review, Allgame found Part II to be "barely a sequel" for it having very few differences from the original game, although liked its challenge and blocky graphics. Allgame also criticized it for becoming boring and tedious after prolonged play. Space Invaders creator Tomohiro Nishikado prefers it over the original, citing its variety in gameplay.

== Legacy ==
Following the release of the original Space Invaders, video game clones appeared on various platforms. At the time, software and video games were not formally recognized as copyrighted works under Japanese copyright law. However, Taito pursued legal action for infringement against Space Invaders Part II; the company won its case in the Tokyo District Court in December 1982, allowing future legal recourse against unauthorized reproductions.

While gameplay was largely identical to the original, Space Invaders Part II added several features. The high score limit was increased to 99,990 points from the original's 9,990 limit. Players could save their name as initials next to their high score. It also introduced the use of brief comical intermission scenes between levels, where the last invader who gets shot limps off screen, a precursor to the cutscene breaks that later appeared in Pac-Man (1980).
