= Space Invaders (1999 video game) =

1999 video game by Activision

- Developers: Z-Axis (Nintendo 64, PlayStation, Windows); Crawfish Interactive (Game Boy Color); Torus Games (Game Boy Advance)
- Publisher: Activision
- Producer: Chris Archer
- Series: Space Invaders
- Platforms: Nintendo 64, PlayStation, Microsoft Windows, Game Boy Color, Game Boy Advance
- Release: September 1999: PlayStation; NA: September 14, 1999; Nintendo 64; NA: September 14, 1999; Microsoft Windows; NA: October 5, 1999; Game Boy Color; NA: 1999; Game Boy Advance; NA: March 19, 2002
- Genre: Fixed shooter
- Modes: Single-player, multiplayer

Space Invaders (released as Space Invaders X in Japan) is a 1999 fixed shooter video game developed by Z-Axis and published by Activision for Microsoft Windows and video game consoles. It is the seventh entry in the Space Invaders series, the first to feature three-dimensional graphics, and the first entry not published by series creator Taito. It was originally released for the Nintendo 64, Game Boy Color, PlayStation, and Microsoft Windows in 1999, and ported to the Game Boy Advance in 2002. The action occurs on a two-dimensional playfield, similar to earlier entries in the series, but all moving objects including the player, enemies, weapons, and power-ups are rendered in 3D, except for the portable versions, which use pre-rendered 2D sprites. Although the Game Boy Color version is single-player only, all others support either one or two simultaneous players, with the Game Boy Advance edition using the Game Link Cable for multiplayer. Reviews varied by platform, ranging from positive to negative.

== Gameplay ==
The basic gameplay of Space Invaders is very similar to earlier games in the series, with the player attempting to fend off a horde of invading aliens that descend in a fixed pattern from the top of the screen. In addition to updated graphics, this version of the game contains new weapons, power-ups, and enemy behaviors. Players can unlock special weapons by defeating four enemies in a row of the same color, as well as a shield upgrade for defeating more powerful enemies. The two-player mode is cooperative, with both players fighting the same inbound enemy horde, but scores are calculated separately for each player so that the winner of a round can be determined. After every few ordinary levels, the player encounters a special boss enemy or a bonus level where the objective is to destroy alien motherships. Some enemies get progressively stronger as the game progresses, with more powerful weapons, the ability to withstand multiple hits, or special tactics such as swarming the player instead of the simple movement patterns of the original game. After beating the game, a port of the original 1978 arcade version is unlocked. Another easter egg is a version of Atari's Asteroids that serves as the boss enemy for the ninth in-game level.

== Development and release ==
In August 1998, Activision announced that it had signed a licensing deal with Taito to bring Space Invaders to PC, PlayStation, Nintendo 64, and Game Boy systems, with Taito retaining publishing rights in Japan and Activision handling all other regions. This was only the second time Taito allowed an outside company to work on the Space Invaders franchise; the company had previously contracted 1985's Return of the Invaders to Universal Playland, although Taito kept the publishing of that game in-house.

Activision delegated the console and PC versions to Z-Axis and outsourced the Game Boy Color port to Crawfish Interactive. Crawfish was particularly proud of the way it maintained the gameplay innovations and high-impact visual style of the higher-end versions despite the limitations of the smaller platform. After the Game Boy Advance launched in 2001, Torus Games updated the handheld version for the new hardware, pre-rendering the original 3D models into high-resolution sprites in order to deliver visuals much closer to the console versions.

Taito released the Nintendo 64 and PlayStation versions in Japan in March 2000. The Japanese editions were published under the names Space Invaders X / Space Invaders EX to highlight their differences from the original Taito game. Taito published the Japanese release of Crawfish's Game Boy Color game in September 2000 and the Game Boy Advance version in August 2002.

Industry sources reported that a Sega Dreamcast version was planned, but it was not released.

== Reception ==
Reception

Review scores
Publication	Score
AllGame	N64: 3/5
Electronic Gaming Monthly	PS: 7/5/5/5
GameSpot	3.3/10
IGN	GBA: 8/10; GBC: 7/10; N64: 7.8/10; PS: 7.9/10
Official U.S. PlayStation Magazine	3/5
AtariHQ	PS: 6/10
GameOver	PC: 70%
Games Domain	PC: Pass
Gaming Age	GBC: B+
HonestGamers	N64: 2.5/5

Matt Casamassina of IGN found the sound and graphics updates to be underwhelming, but enjoyed the "addictive mechanics", "intuitive new bonus projectile system that injects much more strategy and technique into mindlessly blowing away aliens", and "fun two-player mode". In contrast, Jackie Curtis of HonestGamers acknowledged that the new "improvements are smart, logical and add depth to the original" but felt that they ultimately were not enough to overcome the "tedium" of the classic gameplay formula, and that the game was particularly uninspiring when compared to other, more groundbreaking reboots of classic game series on the new 3D-capable consoles. Craig Harris of IGN praised the "great pick-up-and-play nature" of the game as a good fit for the portable Game Boy Advance system, as well as the multiplayer modes. Electronic Gaming Monthly characterized the game as "a great example of how a classic should be brought up to date", but also heavily criticized it for being too short and too easy, a viewpoint shared by Brett Todd of Games Domain. Rommie Johnson of The Tampa Tribune criticized the "painfully long load times" and felt that the updated graphics and sound added little appeal over the 1970s arcade version.
