= Arkanoid: Doh It Again =

1997 video game

- Japanese cover art
- Developer: Taito
- Publishers: JP: Taito; WW: Nintendo
- Composers: Seiji Momoi; Katsuhisa Ishikawa
- Series: Arkanoid
- Platforms: Super Nintendo Entertainment System, Windows
- Release: Super NES: JP: January 15, 1997; NA: November 3, 1997; EU: December 18, 1997; Windows: JP: 1998
- Genre: Block breaker
- Modes: Single-player, multiplayer

Arkanoid: Doh It Again (Note: Japanese: アルカノイド ドー・イット・アゲン) is a 1997 block breaker video game developed and published by Taito. It was first released in Japan for the Super Famicom and Windows, while Nintendo published the SNES version in Australia, North America and Europe. It is the third installment in the Arkanoid series after the original 1986 arcade game and its sequel Arkanoid: Revenge of Doh.

== Gameplay ==
Gameplay screenshot

The player controls a ship using either a standard controller or the Super NES Mouse. Rounds are completed when all the color and silver blocks on the screen have been eliminated. Enemies enter from the doors at the top of the play area. Every eleven rounds a boss enemy will have to be fought. Some of the blocks contain power-ups that must be caught with the paddle to be used. The game has a total of 99 levels, an edit mode in which users can create their own levels, power-ups, and two-player capabilities.

== Plot ==
Arkanoid: Doh It Again picks up five years after the events in Arkanoid, in which the spacecraft Vaus defeated DOH with its energy ball. In the 9th stardawn, Commander Therle writes a log entry recounting the defeat of DOH and stating that their search for a new home goes on.

On the 11th stardawn, the sensors of the interstellar ark Arkanoid pick up a stunning new Terra Class Planet and dispatch the Vaus to conduct colonization surveys. Vaus is warped by DOH, who is surrounding the planet and evidently seeking revenge.

After the player defeats the boss on round 33, Vaus escapes DOH's realm and returns to the Arkanoid, where it is now the 14th stardawn. The planet was only a hoax created by DOH. The same ending occurs after defeating the boss on round 66, destroying both the planet and the game credits again.

After defeating the final boss on round 99, time starts flowing backward. The Vaus escapes for a third time, but it's finally able to land on the planet, on the 13th stardawn. Commander Therle declares that they have found their long-sought home, but will not repeat the mistakes of the past, and humanity and environment would co-exist together. A TV screen appears, as the Commander states that DOH is "banished into oblivion." The Commander then ends his final entry and shuts off the TV.

== Reception ==
Reception

Review scores
Publication	Score
Electronic Gaming Monthly	7.75/10
Joypad	75%
Nintendo Power	6.4/10
Player One	79%
Total!	2+

Released at a time when interest in the Super NES had mostly waned, Arkanoid: Doh it Again was largely ignored by critics. The four reviewers of Electronic Gaming Monthly all considered it a worthy successor to the original Arkanoid (which they ranked as the 41st best console video game of all time just two months earlier), particularly approving of its large number of single-player levels and enjoyable multiplayer action in both competitive and cooperative forms, though some of them complained at the recycling of bosses. Nintendo Power likewise applauded the multiplayer modes.
