= Arkanoid: Revenge of Doh =

1987 video game

- Arcade flyer
- Developers: Taito; Daiei Seisakusho (Famicom)
- Publishers: Taito; Romstar
- Director: Yasumasa Sasabe
- Designer: Kei Shimizu
- Programmer: Yasumasa Sasabe
- Artists: Tetsuro Kitagawa; Kozo Igarashi; Genya Kuriki
- Composers: Hisayoshi Ogura (Arcade); Peter Johnson (Amiga); Noboru Koshinaka (Famicom)
- Series: Arkanoid
- Platforms: Arcade, Amstrad CPC, Atari ST, Commodore 64, Amiga, MSX2, Famicom, MS-DOS, ZX Spectrum, Apple IIGS, X68000
- Release: JP: June 1987; NA: July 1987
- Genre: block breaker
- Modes: Single-player, multiplayer

Arkanoid: Revenge of Doh is a 1987 block breaker video game developed and published by Taito for arcades. It is the sequel to Arkanoid. It was ported to the Family Computer and various personal computers. Hamster Corporation released the game as part of their Arcade Archives series for the Nintendo Switch and PlayStation 4, as well as their Arcade Archives 2 series for the Nintendo Switch 2, PlayStation 5 and Xbox Series X/S in September 2026.

== Plot ==
The mysterious enemy known as DOH has returned to seek vengeance on the Vaus space vessel. The player must once again take control of the Vaus (paddle) and overcome many challenges in order to destroy DOH once and for all. Revenge of Doh sees the player battle through 34 rounds, taken from a grand total of 64.

== Gameplay ==
Arcade version gameplay

The same level in the Amiga version

Revenge of Doh differs from its predecessor with the introduction of "Warp Gates". Upon completion of a level or when the Break ("B") pill is caught, two gates appear at the bottom of the play area, on either side. The player can choose to go through either one of the gates, and the choice will affect which version of the next level is provided. The fire-button is only used when the Laser Cannons ("L") or Catch ("C") pill is caught.

The game has new power-ups and enemy types, and two new types of bricks. Notched silver bricks, like normal silver bricks, take several hits to destroy. However, once a short period of time has elapsed after destruction, they regenerate at full strength. These bricks do not need to be destroyed in order to complete a level. In addition, some bricks move left to right as long as their sides are not obstructed by other bricks.

The US version has an entirely different layout for Level 1 that features a whole line of notched bricks, with all colored bricks above it moving from side to side.

On round 17, the player must defeat a giant brain as a mini-boss. After completing all 33 rounds, the player faces DOH in two forms as a final confrontation: its original, statue-like incarnation, and then a creature with tentacles that break off and regenerate when struck.

Home versions include a level editor, which players can use to create their own levels or edit and replace existing levels.

== Release ==
Revenge of Doh initially released in arcades in June 1987. In June 1989, versions for MS-DOS, Atari ST, Apple IIGS, and Commodore 64 were released.

== Reception ==
Reception

Review score
| Publication | Score |
|---|---|
| Famitsu | 7/10, 7/10, 7/10, 6/10 (FC) |

Award
| Publication | Award |
|---|---|
| Your Sinclair | YS Megagame |

In Japan, Game Machine listed Arkanoid: Revenge of Doh on their July 1, 1987 issue as being the third most-successful table arcade unit of the month. It went on to become Japan's eighth highest-grossing arcade conversion kit of 1988.
