= Sonic Blast Man =

1990 arcade game

- Promotional sales flyer
- Developers: Taito (arcade); I.T.L (SNES)
- Publisher: Taito
- Series: Sonic Blast Man
- Platforms: Arcade, Super Nintendo Entertainment System
- Release: December 1990: Arcade December 1990 SNES; JP: September 25, 1992; NA: 1992
- Genre: Beat 'em up
- Mode: Single-player
- Arcade system: Taito B System

Sonic Blast Man (Note: Japanese: ソニックブラストマン) is a 1990 arcade video game by Taito starring the titular superhero, Sonic Blastman. A SNES adaptation appeared in 1992, with much different gameplay. Both versions received a sequel.

== Arcade version ==
The arcade version involves striking enemies and targets, each of which has a set number of tons of resistance. Once this resistance is depleted, the target is defeated. The game features a pair of gloves, and a mechanical punch pad that rises when it is time to attack. The player must wear the gloves and punch the pad strongly enough to deal damage. Only three hits are allowed.

The game features five stages. Within each stage, there are fairly typical scenarios that most super heroes encounter. Each level is progressive in terms of difficulty.

The stages in the game:

- A woman being assaulted by a thug.
- A baby carriage pushed in the middle of the freeway by accident, and a truck will soon run over it.
- An armed group took control of a building that is now its center of operations.
- A giant crab is terrorizing a cruise ship.
- An asteroid is set to crash into Earth.

In March 1995 Taito recalled Sonic Blastman machines after reports of players who sustained injuries by playing the game. A year later, Taito paid a fine of $50,000 (USD) for failing to disclose these injuries.

== SNES version ==
The SNES version is a beat 'em up. In this version Sonic Blastman must save the Earth from diverse kinds of evil forces, from street gangs and terrorists, to aliens and robots and finally, an evil clone of himself under the name of "Heavy Blast Man". The fight starts on a construction site in Earth and ends up in outer space.

The game is only for one player. As in any beat 'em up, the game consists of defeating the enemies on screen before continuing in the stage. Sonic Blastman can punch, jump, and grab his enemies, too. He also uses a special attack that knocks any enemy nearby, but it dizzies him temporally. Another particular feature is the way Sonic Blastman holds his enemies: when he approaches his enemies, he is able to grab them in order to shake them and throw them back from him, or unleash a series of punches, but if he punches them repeatedly, he will eventually hold them, so that he can blast them with a sonic wave, hit them with a whirlwind punch or throw them backwards. All of these throwing effects depend on the direction the d-pad is being pressed when pressing the punch button. His most powerful attack is his D. Punch, which must be charged with a certain button, which can be discharged. The D. Punch is also a limited attack.

The bonus levels are an adaptation of the arcade version. The major difference is that since there is no punch pad, the player must charge strength by repeatedly rotating the d-pad.

Like with most beat 'em-ups of the era, the Japanese version had female enemies which were replaced by male ones in the American and European versions, mostly because of Nintendo of America's strict censorship issues at the time. Only the first two stages of the game feature human enemies.

== Legacy ==
Both versions received a sequel. The arcade sequel entitled Real Puncher is similar to the original game, but with new levels and a photo camera mode for faces of people in each level of the game. Outside of Japan, the game was released as a ticket redemption game. In the United States, Sonic Blastman was the highest-grossing novelty arcade game on the RePlay redemption charts in February 1995.

The SNES sequel, entitled Sonic Blast Man II, plays similarly to its predecessor, as well, and adds more options, such as new playable characters "Sonia" and "Captain Choyear", two-player modes, and others.

Sonic Blast Man also made a few appearances in other games as a guest character, such as Puzzle Bobble 3 (released on consoles as Bust-A-Move 3 in America and Europe).

Taito revealed another sequel titled Sonic Blast Heroes at the AOU 2010 conference in February and was planned to hit arcades at the end of that month. The game was called Real Puncher 2 outside of Japan.

== Arcade connections ==
- Fighting Mania (2000) (by Konami)

== Reception ==
Reception

Aggregate score
Aggregator	Score
GameRankings	72% (SNES)

In North America, Sonic Blast Man was the top-grossing new video game on the RePlay arcade charts in 1991.
