= Arkanoid =

1986 video game

- Japanese arcade flyer
- Developer: Taito
- Publishers: JP/EU: Taito; NA: Romstar
- Designers: Akira Fujita; Hiroshi Tsujino
- Composer: Hisayoshi Ogura
- Series: Arkanoid
- Platform: Arcade: Amstrad CPC, Amiga, Apple II, Apple IIGS, Atari 8-bit, Atari ST, BBC Micro, Commodore 64, NES, iOS, Classic Mac OS, mobile phone, MS-DOS, MSX, PC-88, PC-98, Thomson, TRS-80 Color Computer, ZX Spectrum, PlayStation 4, PlayStation 5, Nintendo Switch
- Release: July 1986: Arcade; JP: July 1986; NA: August 1986 NES; JP: December 26, 1986; NA: August 1987 C64; EU: Early 1987; NA: July 1988 MS-DOS November 1988 Apple II, Apple IIGS, Atari ST December 1988
- Genre: Block breaker
- Modes: Single-player, multiplayer

Arkanoid (Note: Japanese: アルカノイド, Hepburn: Arukanoido) is a 1986 block breaker video game developed and published by Taito for arcades. It was released in North America by Romstar. The game revitalized the concept established by Atari, Inc.'s successful Breakout from a decade earlier and established the model for numerous games to follow. Arkanoid was ported to many home systems, including the Commodore 64, Nintendo Entertainment System, and ZX Spectrum.

Controlling a paddle-like craft known as the Vaus, the player is tasked with clearing a formation of colorful blocks by deflecting a ball towards it without letting the ball leave the bottom edge of the playfield. Some blocks contain power-ups with various effects, such as increasing the length of the Vaus, creating several additional balls, or equipping the Vaus with cannons. Other blocks may be indestructible or require multiple hits to break.

Created by Taito designers Akira Fujita and Hiroshi Tsujino, Arkanoid was part of a internal game development competition within Taito in the early 1980s, during which two teams of designers had to implement a block breaker game and determine which was superior to the other. The 1982 film Tron was noted as an inspiration for the game's futuristic neon aesthetic.

Early location tests for Arkanoid surpassed Taito's initial expectations. It became a major success in arcades, becoming the highest-grossing table arcade game of 1987 in Japan, and the year's highest-grossing conversion kit in the United States. The game was commended by critics for its simple but engaging gameplay and for its improvements over the original Breakout concept. Arkanoid would go on to spawn a long series of sequels and updates.

== Gameplay ==
The start of a level (arcade version)

Arkanoid is a block breaker video game. Its plot involves the starship Arkanoid being attacked by a mysterious entity from space named DOH. A small paddle-shaped craft, the Vaus, is ejected from the Arkanoid.

The player controls the Vaus with a control knob, moving it from side to side in order to hit a ball into a pattern of bricks and destroy them. After all bricks have been destroyed, the player advances to the next level and faces a new pattern. Most bricks can be destroyed in one hit; some require multiple hits, and others cannot be destroyed at all. Some bricks release capsules that bestow various power-ups when caught, such as increasing the length of the Vaus, temporarily slowing the ball down, or granting an extra life. Floating enemies/obstacles emerge onto the screen at times and can be hit for bonus points.

On the final stage (33 on most versions, but 36 on the NES), the player takes on the game's boss, "DOH". Once this point is reached, the player no longer has the option to continue after running out of lives, making this segment more difficult. The game is over regardless of the outcome.

If the player succeeds in defeating "DOH", the game rewards them by showing the ending, in which time starts to flow backwards, and Vaus escapes the distorted space just in time to return to the Arkanoid, which has also reversed back to perfect condition. The game's text warns, however, that the journey has only started, and that the player has not seen the last of "DOH".

== Development and release ==
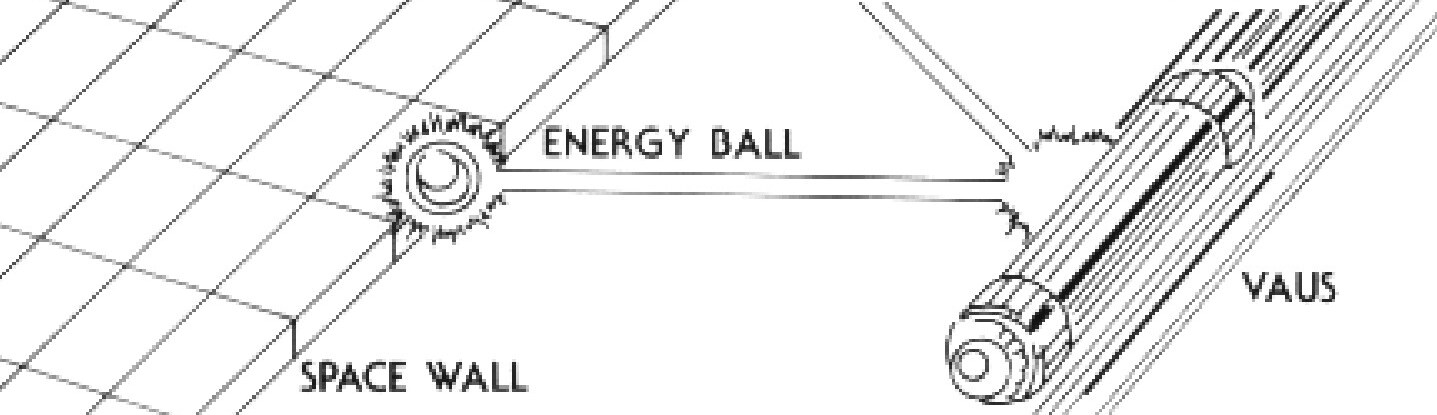
Illustration of the ball-and-paddle concept in Arkanoid

Arkanoid was designed by Akira Fujita and Hiroshi "ONIJUST" Tsujino, both of whom were members of Taito's Yokohama Research Institute. The company's sales department requested a new block breaker arcade game due to the genre seeing an upturn in popularity following a steady downfall in the early 1980s. This led to a competition being held within the company to design the new game, which was jointly won by Fujita and Tsujino, who were then instructed to combine their ideas into a single project. The game builds on the overall block breaker concept established in Atari's Breakout (1976), a widely successful arcade game that spawned a long series of similar clone games by other manufacturers.

The development team consisted of Fujita in charge of planning, with Tsujino providing level design and graphics and two others programming the arcade board, a modified version of the Taito Classic hardware. The futuristic neon aesthetic was inspired by the film Tron (1982), which Tsujino was a big fan of. Blocks originally never had colors and were simply the same color, which was changed to the minor annoyance of Tsujino. The various geometric-like enemies and power-up items were hand-drawn from 3-dimensional models before being converted into sprite art. Hisayoshi Ogura, the founder of Taito's "house band" Zuntata, created the game's music.

The game had a short development time with tight work deadlines, a schedule which Tsujino has since claimed to be "murderous". Location testing for the game began only a month after the start of development. It was incredibly well received by playtesters, and generated a lot more popularity and income than Taito had expected. Arkanoid was officially released in Japan in July 1986, and in North America later that year by distributor company Romstar.

== Ports ==
Arkanoid was converted for the ZX Spectrum, Amstrad CPC, Commodore 64, BBC Micro, MSX, Atari 8-bit computers, Apple II, NES, Amiga, Atari ST, Apple IIGS. and IBM PC compatibles. A Classic Mac OS version was released in 1987, and a port was released for the Tandy Color Computer 3 in 1989. Computer conversions were published by Imagine. The NES and MSX ports were packaged with a custom paddle controller. Hamster Corporation released the game as part of their Arcade Archives series for the Nintendo Switch and PlayStation 4, as well as their Arcade Archives 2 series for the Nintendo Switch 2, PlayStation 5 and Xbox Series X/S in May 2026.

== Reception ==
=== Commercial ===
Arkanoid became one of Taito's most profitable coin-operated games. In Japan, Game Machine listed it as being the most popular arcade game of August 1986, and it remained the top-grossing table arcade cabinet for six months through September, October, November and December 1986, up until February 1987. Arkanoid was Japan's highest-grossing table arcade game during the second half of 1986, and the overall sixth highest-grossing table arcade game of 1986. It later went on to be the country's overall highest-grossing table arcade game of 1987.

In the United States, it was the highest-grossing arcade conversion kit of 1987. In the United Kingdom, it was the fourth highest-grossing arcade game of 1986 on London's Electrocoin charts. Euromax listed it as being the third most popular arcade game in Europe during 1987.

=== Critical ===
Reception

Review scores
Publication	Score							
Publication	Amiga	Arcade	Atari ST	C64	Macintosh	NES	PC	ZX
AllGame		3.5/5						
Crash								59%
Computer and Video Games	8/10	Positive		87%				84%
Dragon					5/5			
Génération 4	92%							
The Games Machine (UK)			89%	87%			86% (CPC)	71%
Commodore User				8/10				
The Day						10/10		

Awards
Publication	Award
Gamest Awards	Silver Award
Compute!	Games of the Year
Entertainment Software Trade Awards	Best Arcade Game
Computer Gaming World	Best Arcade Translation
VideoGames & Computer Entertainment	Best Video/Computer Arcade Translation
Popular Computing Weekly	Hall of Fame

The arcade game was reviewed in Computer and Video Games by Clare Edgeley in November 1986, where she compared it to Pong and Space Invaders in its simple but engaging gameplay. She described Arkanoid as "a lovely game" that is "fast, colourful, simple and addictive".

The home versions were also well received. Computer Gaming World stated in 1988 that Arkanoid on the Amiga was "a perfect version of the arcade game ... incredible!" It named the NES version the Best Arcade Translation for the console that year, praising the graphics and play mechanics. The game was reviewed in 1989 in Dragon #144 by Hartley, Patricia, and Kirk Lesser in "The Role of Computers" column. The reviewers gave the game 5 out of 5 stars. Compute! named the game to its list of "nine great games for 1989", describing it as "hypnotic, addictive, and fascinating". Along with Breakout, the magazine noted Arkanoid also has elements of Pong and Space Invaders as well as Pac-Man in its use of power-ups.

=== Accolades ===
Arkanoid and its home releases received several awards, including the "Silver Award" from the Gamest Awards, "Games of the Year" from Compute! magazine, "Best Arcade Game" from the Entertainment Software Trade Awards, "Best Arcade Translation" from Computer Gaming World, and "Best Video/Computer Arcade Translation" (for the NES version) from VideoGames & Computer Entertainment. Arkanoid was the first game to enter the Popular Computing Weekly Hall of Fame, in 1987.

In 1997, Electronic Gaming Monthly editors ranked the NES version the 41st best console video game of all time, describing it as "the type of game that you'd pick up because you need a quick video game fix but would end up playing for hours". They particularly noted that despite the ability to shoot lasers, the game demanded a great deal of skill from the player.

== Legacy ==
Arkanoid series
1986	Arkanoid
1987	Arkanoid: Revenge of Doh
1988–1996
1997	Arkanoid: Doh It Again
1997	Arkanoid Returns
1998
1999	Arkanoid R 2000
2000–2006
2007	Arkanoid DS
2008
2009	Arkanoid Live!
2009	Arkanoid HD
2009	Arkanoid Plus!
2010–2016
2017	Arkanoid vs. Space Invaders
2018–2021
2022	Arkanoid: Eternal Battle

Arkanoid was followed by a number of direct and indirect sequels. Tournament Arkanoid was released in 1987 exclusively in the United States by Romstar. Developed by Taito America rather than Taito Japan, it has the same gameplay as Arkanoid, but adds new levels. Revenge of Doh, a true sequel with new gameplay mechanics, was released in arcades in 1987. Arkanoid: Doh It Again and Arkanoid Returns were published in 1997, followed by Arkanoid DS in 2007.

Arkanoid Live! was published as on May 6, 2009, for Xbox Live Arcade. The WiiWare game Arkanoid Plus! was released in the same year in Japan on May 26, PAL regions on August 21, and in North America on September 28. A version of Arkanoid for iOS was released in 2009.

The mashup Arkanoid vs. Space Invaders was released in 2017 for iOS and Android.

The first Touhou Project game, Highly Responsive to Prayers, which was originally released in 1997, was heavily influenced by Arkanoid gameplay.

Arkanoid appears in Life Is Strange: True Colors.

A modernized version of the game, titled Arkanoid: Eternal Battle, was developed by Pastagames and published by Microids. It was released in October 2022 for Nintendo Switch, PlayStation 4, PlayStation 5, Windows, Xbox One, and Xbox Series X/S. The original 1986 arcade version is included in this game.
