= Tomohiro Nishikado =

Japanese video game designer (born 1944)

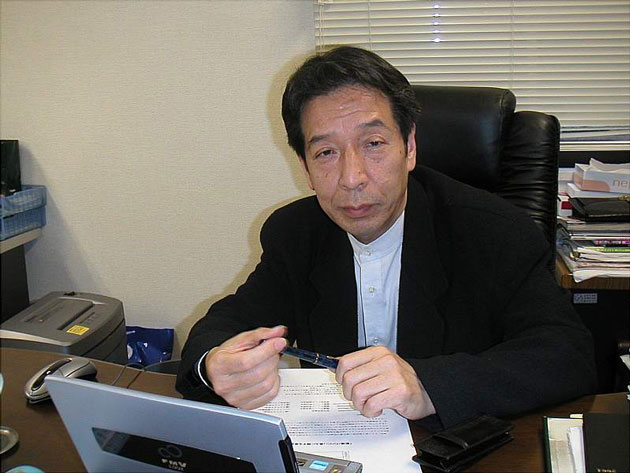
- Nishikado in 2011
- Born: March 31, 1944 (age 82); Osaka, Japan
- Education: Tokyo Denki University
- Occupation: Video game developer
- Known for: Space Invaders; Speed Race (Wheels); Western Gun (Gun Fight)

Tomohiro Nishikado (西角 友宏, Nishikado Tomohiro; born March 31, 1944) is a Japanese video game designer and engineer. He is the creator of Taito's arcade video game Space Invaders, released in 1978, often credited as the first shoot 'em up and for beginning the golden age of arcade video games. Prior to Space Invaders, he also designed other earlier Taito arcade games, including the shooting electro-mechanical games Sky Fighter (1971) and Sky Fighter II, the sports video game TV Basketball in 1974, the vertical scrolling racing video game Speed Race (also known as Wheels) in 1974, the multi-directional shooter Western Gun (also known as Gun Fight) in 1975, and the first-person combat flight simulator Interceptor (1975).

== Early life and career ==
Tomohiro Nishikado was born in 1944. He began conducting his own science experiments at an early age and, in junior high school, started working with electronics by building radios and amplifiers. He graduated with an engineering degree from Tokyo Denki University in 1967. He had originally planned to work for Sony, but failed the final round of the company's testing process, so he instead joined an audio engineering company called Takt in early 1967. But after completing his training there he was not put in the development department, so he quit a year later and looked for a new job, eventually accepting a job offer from a communications company. Before beginning work, he met an old colleague at a train station who told him about the work he was doing at Taito, which Nishikado found interesting. His friend told him that Taito were desperately searching for new engineers, so Nishikado decided to join Taito instead of the communications company.

He joined Pacific Industries Ltd in 1968, a subsidiary of Taito Trading Company. He began working on arcade electro-mechanical games, developing the hit target shooting games Sky Fighter (1971) and Sky Fighter II. His bosses at Taito believed transistor-transistor logic (TTL) technology would play a significant role in the arcade industry, so they tasked Nishikado with investigating TTL technology as he was the company's only employee who knew how to work with integrated circuit (IC) technology, and one of the few engineers at any Japanese coin-op company with significant expertise in solid-state electronics.

He began working on video game development in 1972. He was interested in creating arcade video games, so he spent six months dissecting Atari's Pong arcade unit and learning how the game's integrated circuits worked, and began modifying the game. He developed Elepong (similar to Pong), one of Japan's earliest locally produced arcade video games, released in 1973. He produced more than ten video games up until 1977, before Space Invaders was released in 1978.

== Best known games ==
=== Sky Fighter and Sky Fighter II ===
Nishikado developed Sky Fighter, a target shooting electro-mechanical game released by Taito for amusement arcades in 1971. The game used mirrors to project images of model planes in front of a moving sky-blue background from a film canister on a rotating drum. The game was a hit, but too large for most locations, so it was followed by a scaled-down version, Sky Fighter II, which sold 3,000 arcade cabinets.

=== Soccer and Davis Cup ===
His first original arcade video games were the Pong-style sports video games Soccer and Davis Cup, with Soccer developed first but both released in November 1973. Davis Cup was a team sport video game, a tennis doubles game with similar ball-and-paddle gameplay to Pong but played in doubles, allowing up to four players to compete, like Atari's Pong Doubles (1973) released the same year. Soccer was also a team sport video game, based on association football. Soccer was also a ball-and-paddle game like Pong, but with a green background to simulate a playfield, allowed each player to control both a forward and a goalkeeper, and let them adjust the size of the players who were represented as paddles on screen. It also had a goal on each side. Nishikado considers Soccer to be Japan's first original domestically produced video game, in comparison to Japanese Pong clones released earlier, including Sega's Pong Tron and Taito's Elepong.

=== TV Basketball ===
TV Basketball (Note: Japanese: バスケットボールTV, Hepburn: Basukesutobōru TV) was an arcade basketball video game released by Taito in April 1974. It was designed by Tomohiro Nishikado, who wanted to move beyond simple rectangles to character graphics. Taito released the game in Europe as Basketball in 1974.

It was the earliest use of character sprites to represent human player characters in a video game. The gameplay was largely similar to earlier ball-and-paddle games, but with human-like characters rather than simple rectangles. Nishikado came up with the concept by taking "a typical pong game" and rearranging the shapes so that they looked like objects such as a basketball hoop. It was also the earliest basketball video game in arcades, and the second basketball-themed video game in general, after the Basketball overlay released for the Magnavox Odyssey console in 1973.

In February 1974, TV Basketball became the earliest non-American video game to be licensed for release in North America, with a deal initially made with Atari. However, the game instead ended up being licensed to Midway Manufacturing, who released the game in North America as TV Basketball in June 1974. It sold 1,400 arcade cabinets in the United States, a video game production record for Midway, up until the release of Wheels. TV Basketball was the first basketball video game released by Midway, which later followed with Arch Rivals (1989) and NBA Jam (1993).

=== Speed Race (Wheels) ===
Nishikado's Speed Race was a driving racing video game, released in November 1974. He considers it to be his favourite among the games he had worked on prior to Space Invaders. It was also one the first Japanese video games released in North America, where it was distributed by Midway. Running on Taito Discrete Logic hardware, the game used sprites with collision detection. The game's most important innovation was its introduction of scrolling graphics, where the sprites moved along a vertical scrolling overhead track, with the course width becoming wider or narrower as the player's car moves up the road, while the player races against other rival cars, more of which appear as the score increases. The faster the player's car drives, the more the score increases. The game's concept was adapted from two earlier electro-mechanical driving games: Kasco's Mini Drive (1958) and Taito's Super Road 7 (1970).

In contrast to the volume-control dials used in his earlier Pong-inspired machines, Speed Race had a realistic racing wheel controller, with an accelerator, gear shift, speedometer and tachometer. It could be played in either single-player or alternating two-player, where each player attempts to beat the other's score. The game also had selectable difficulty levels, giving players an option between "Beginner's race" and "Advanced player's race". The game was re-branded as Wheels by Midway for released in the United States and was influential on later racing games. Midway also released a version called Racer in the United States. Wheels and Wheels II sold 10,000 cabinets in the United States to become the best-selling arcade game of 1975.

The game received nine sequels:

- Speed Race Deluxe (1975)
- Speed Race Twin (1976)
- Super Speed Race (1977)
- Super Speed Race V (1978)
- T. T. Speed Race CL (1978)
- Speed Race CL-5 (1980)
- Super Speed Race GP V (1980)
- Super Speed Race Jr. (1985)
- Automobili Lamborghini: Super Speed Race 64 (1998)

=== Western Gun (Gun Fight) ===
His next major title was Western Gun (known as Gun Fight in the United States), released in 1975. The game's concept was adapted from a Sega arcade electro-mechanical game, called Gun Fight (1969), with the cowboy figurines adapted into character sprites and both players able to maneuver across a landscape while shooting each other. The game is historically significant for several reasons. It was an early on-foot, multi-directional shooter, that could be played in single-player or two-player. It also introduced video game violence, being the first video game to depict human-to-human combat, and the first to depict a gun on screen. The game introduced dual-stick controls, with one eight-way joystick for movement and the other for changing the shooting direction, and was one of the earliest video games to represent game characters and fragments of story through its visual presentation.

The player characters used in the game represented avatars for the players, and would yell "Got me!" when one of them is shot. Other features of the game included obstacles such as a cactus, and in later levels, pine trees and moving wagons, that can provide cover for the players and are destructible. The guns have limited ammunition, with each player limited to six bullets, and shots can ricochet off the top or bottom edges of the playfield, allowing for indirect hits to be used as a strategy.

Western Gun was his next game licensed to Midway for release in the United States, with the title changed to Gun Fight for its American release. Midway's Gun Fight adaptation was itself notable for being the first video game to use a microprocessor. Nishikado's Western Gun allowed the two players to move around anywhere on the screen, whereas Midway's version Gun Fight restricts each player to their respective portions of the screen, with the characters made larger in size. Nishikado believed that his original version was more fun, but was impressed with the improved graphics and smoother animation of Midway's version. This led him to design microprocessors into his subsequent games.

Gun Fight was a success in the arcades, selling 8,600 arcade cabinets in the United States, where it was the third highest-grossing arcade game of 1975 and the second highest-grossing arcade game of 1976. The game was ported to the Bally Astrocade console and several computer platforms. Gun Fight's success helped pave the way for Japanese video games in the American market.

=== Interceptor ===
Interceptor (Note: Japanese: インターセプター, Hepburn: Intāseputā) is a first-person combat flight simulator designed by Tomohiro Nishikado. The game was first demonstrated in 1975, before releasing in Japan in March 1976, and in Europe the same year. It involved piloting a jet fighter, using an eight-way joystick to aim with a crosshair and shoot at enemy aircraft that move in formations of two, can scale in size depending on their distance to the player, and can move out of the player's firing range. The game used a form of pseudo-3D object-scaling to create the illusion of 3D space, a technique that was later used in racing video games such as Atari's Night Driver (1976) and Namco's Pole Position (1982), and more extensively in Sega Super Scaler arcade games during the mid-to-late 1980s.

=== Space Invaders ===
In 1977, Nishikado began developing Space Invaders, which he created entirely on his own. In addition to designing and programming the game, he also did the artwork and sounds, and engineered the game's arcade hardware, putting together a microcomputer from scratch. Following its release in 1978, Space Invaders went on to become his most successful video game. It is frequently cited as the "first" or "original" in the shoot 'em up genre.

Space Invaders pitted the player against multiple enemies descending from the top of the screen at a constantly increasing speed. The game used alien creatures inspired by The War of the Worlds because the developers were unable to render the movement of aircraft; in turn, the aliens replaced human enemies because of moral concerns (regarding the portrayal of killing humans) on the part of Taito. As with subsequent shoot 'em ups of the time, the game was set in space as the available technology only permitted a black background. The game also introduced the idea of giving the player a number of "lives". It sold over 360,000 arcade cabinets worldwide, and by 1981 had grossed more than $1 billion, equivalent to $2.5 billion in 2011.

As one of the earliest shooter games, it set precedents and helped pave the way for future titles and for the shooting genre. Space Invaders popularized a more interactive style of gameplay with the enemies responding to the player controlled cannon's movement. It was also the first video game to popularize the concept of achieving a high score, being the first game to save the player's score. It was also the first game where players had to repel hordes of creatures, take cover from enemy fire, and use destructible barriers, in addition to being the first game to use a continuous background soundtrack, with four simple chromatic descending bass notes repeating in a loop, though it was dynamic and changed pace during stages. It also moved the gaming industry away from Pong-inspired sports games grounded in real-world situations towards action games involving fantastical situations. Space Invaders set the template for the shoot 'em up genre, with its influence extending to most shooting games released to the present day, including first-person shooters such as Wolfenstein, Doom, Halo and Call of Duty.

Game designer Shigeru Miyamoto considers Space Invaders a game that revolutionized the video game industry; he was never interested in video games before seeing it, and it would inspire him to produce video games. Several publications ascribe the expansion of the video game industry from a novelty into a global industry to the success of the game, attributing the shift of video games from bars and arcades to more mainstream locations like restaurants and department stores to Space Invaders. The game's success is also credited for ending the video game crash of 1977 and beginning the golden age of video arcade games. The launch of the arcade phenomenon in North America was in part due to Space Invaders. Game Informer considers it, along with Pac-Man, one of the most popular arcade games that tapped into popular culture and generated excitement during the golden age of arcades. The game also played an important role during the second generation of consoles, when it became the Atari 2600's first killer app, establishing Atari as the market leader in the home video game market at the time. Space Invaders is today regarded as one of the most influential video games of all time.

== Later career ==
Nishikado's later credited games for Taito included the racing video game Chase HQ II: Special Criminal Investigation in 1989, the scrolling shooters Darius II (Sagaia) in 1989 and Darius Twin in 1991, the platform game Parasol Stars: The Story of Bubble Bobble III in 1991, the SNES role-playing video game Lufia & the Fortress of Doom in 1993, the beat 'em up Sonic Blast Man II in 1994, and the puzzle game Bust-A-Move 2 (Puzzle Bobble 2) in 1995.

He left Taito in 1996 to found his own company, Dreams. Under Dreams when it was owned by Nishikado, his credited games include Bust-A-Move Millennium, published by Acclaim Entertainment in 2000.

Dreams is also credited for Chase HQ: Secret Police published by Metro3D for the Game Boy Color in 1999, the 3D eroge visual novel Dancing Cats published by Illusion for the PC in 2000, Super Bust-A-Move (Super Puzzle Bobble) published by Taito for the PlayStation 2 in 2000, Rainbow Islands (Bubble Bobble 2) and Shaun Palmer's Pro Snowboarder for the Game Boy Color in 2001, and the 2008 Nintendo DS version of Ys I & II. He personally oversaw the development of Space Invaders Revolution, released by Taito in 2005, and was involved in the development of Space Invaders Infinity Gene, released by Taito's current owner Square Enix in 2008. Dreams was involved in the development of the fighting game Battle Fantasia, released by Arc System Works in 2008.

As of 2013, he is no longer with Dreams, and presently works for Taito as a technical advisor.

== See also ==
- List of Taito games
