= Rev Limit =

Unreleased sim racing video game

- Title screen
- Developer: SETA Corporation
- Publisher: SETA Corporation
- Producer: Harada Noboru
- Designer: Yasuhiko Kikuchi
- Platforms: 64DD, Arcade, Nintendo 64
- Release: Unreleased
- Genre: Racing
- Modes: Single-player, multiplayer
- Arcade system: Aleck 64

Rev Limit (Note: Japanese: レブ リミット, Hepburn: Rebu Rimitto) is an unreleased sim racing video game that was in development and planned to be published by Seta Corporation in May 1998 for the Nintendo 64. It was also intended to be the first arcade title to use Seta's own Aleck 64 arcade board, and was planned for the 64DD as well. It was one of the earliest original third-party racing titles to be announced for the system. In the game, players compete against either computer-controlled vehicles or other human opponents across several tracks of varying thematic in order to reach first place and advance to the next course.

Rev Limit was previewed in 1996 and first showcased running in real-time at the Shoshinkai 1996 to mixed reception from the video game press and attendees of the event. Shown across various video game magazines, its release was constantly postponed as the game underwent numerous redesigns, with Seta facing financial difficulties that diminished their output and eventually lead to the game's cancellation for both the Nintendo 64 and arcades. Although it was never officially released to the public, a prototype cartridge surfaced in 2016.

== Gameplay ==
Gameplay screenshot from the recently revealed 1999 build

Rev Limit is a racing game similar to Ridge Racer and Gran Turismo, where the player must maneuver any of the cars to compete against either artificially intelligent opponents or another human opponent on various race tracks set across multiple locations. The game features various modes to choose from at the main menu, such as Arcade, Time Attack, Championship and Versus Battle. Players can also change weather conditions, automatic or manual transmission for the vehicle, number of laps and more. The Option screen allows the player to configure the control settings and other options. In Arcade mode, the courses are grouped into six different classes to choose before racing.

== History ==
Rev Limit was first previewed in the fourth quarther of 1996 in various magazines, before being showcased running in real-time and playable for the first time to attendees at Shoshinkai 1996 where its visuals received praises, but otherwise it had a mixed reception. It was one of the first original racing titles to be announced for the Nintendo 64, and was shown alongside other titles in development from Seta such as Chopper Attack and Eikō no Saint Andrews at the aforementioned event. Early previews of the game mentioned playable game modes such as sprint, endurance and drag races but no support for multiplayer, and touted it for a 1997 release.

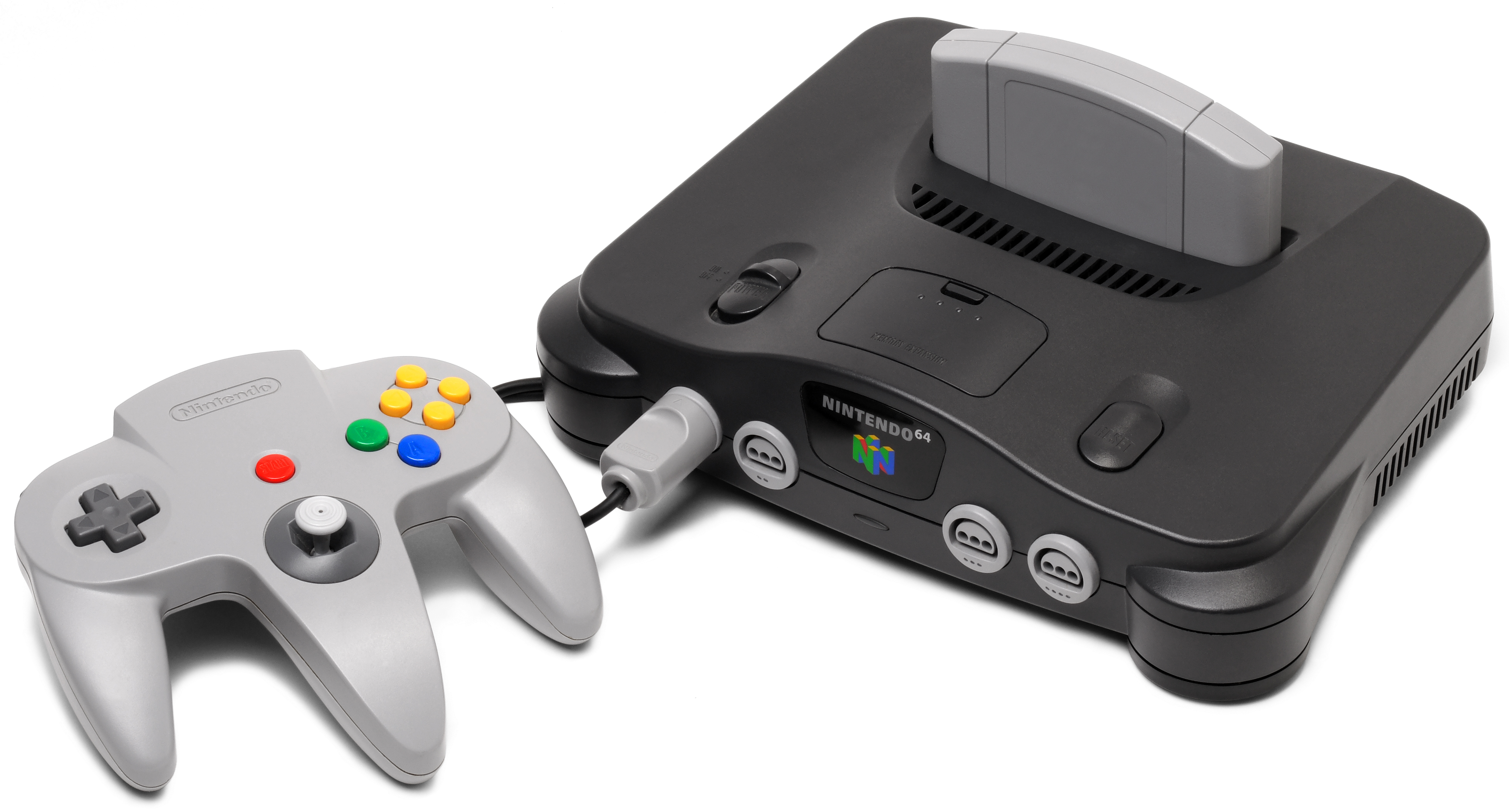
Rev Limit was first developed for the Nintendo 64.

Yasuhiko Kikuchi was one of the designers involved with the project, while Harada Noboru served as the leader of the development team during production. The title continued to be previewed in magazines and was demonstrated once again to the public at Nintendo Space World 1997, now touted for a 1998 release, and planned as the first title for Seta's own Aleck 64 arcade board. Although the game failed to make an appearance at E3 1998, Seta reassured that the title was still on scheduled to be published despite kept being delayed. However, despite being now planned for release on the 64DD, Seta started to face financial constrains in the late 1990s that diminished their output as a result, which would eventually lead to the cancellation of the game for both Nintendo 64 and arcades.

In 2016, a prototype cartridge containing a 1999 build of Rev Limit was sold off at Yahoo! Auctions in Japan, containing various differences compared to other previously showcased versions of the game, as well as grammatical errors.
