= Saikyō Habu Shōgi =

1996 video game

- Developer: Seta
- Publisher: Seta
- Platform: Nintendo 64
- Release: JP: June 23, 1996
- Genre: Board game
- Mode: Single-player

Saikyō Habu Shōgi (Note: Japanese: 最強羽生将棋; lit. Strongest Habu Shogi) is a Japanese virtual board game for the Nintendo 64 developed and published by Seta. It was released exclusively in Japan on June 23, 1996, as one of the Nintendo 64's three Japanese launch games alongside Super Mario 64 and Pilotwings 64. It was the only launch game to use the Controller Pak and to be published by a third-party. The game's "special guest" is the shogi player Yoshiharu Habu, who won all seven major shogi championships the year of the game's release.

== Sales ==
Though it was anticipated that the game would be a bestseller and a major showcase for the Nintendo 64's processing power, sales were not high, with only about one copy accompanying every one hundred consoles sold at the system launch.

== Legacy ==
Seta released an indirect sequel for the Nintendo 64 titled Morita Shogi 64 as part of the Morita Shogi series, which was announced at Nintendo Space World in 1996, and later a direct sequel Kosoku Tanigawa Shogi (lit. Lightening Speed Tanigawa Shogi) for the PlayStation 2.
