= Morita Shogi 64 =

1998 video game

- Developer(s): Seta
- Publisher(s): Seta
- Platform(s): Nintendo 64
- Release: JP: April 3, 1998
- Genre(s): Board game
- Mode(s): Single player

Morita Shogi 64 (森田将棋64) is a Japanese virtual board game for the Nintendo 64. It was released only in Japan in 1998.

It is the indirect sequel to Saikyō Habu Shōgi, a launch game for the Nintendo 64.

It has a built-in RJ-11 Modem Connection port with which players were able to connect to (now defunct) servers to play against other players all around Japan. The game can be exploited for arbitrary code execution, allowing owners to run their own homebrew software.

== See also ==
- Shogi
- List of Nintendo 64 games
