= Twin Eagle =

1988 video game

- Developer(s): SETA Corporation; Visco (NES)
- Publisher(s): Taito, Romstar (NA NES), Visco (JP Famicom)
- Platform(s): Arcade, NES
- Release: 1988: Arcade; 1989: NES
- Genre(s): Scrolling shooter
- Mode(s): Up to 2 players simultaneously

Twin Eagle: Revenge Joe's Brother is a vertically scrolling shooter arcade game which was published in 1988. It was developed by SETA Corporation and licensed to Taito. It was one of the first arcade to use extensive digital sampling, from digitized photos to a digitized soundtrack. Controlling a helicopter, the player shoots aircraft and other attackers to earn points. If certain buildings are destroyed, hostages are found and extra points are received for saving them. A NES port was published a year later by Romstar.

Twin Eagle was followed by a sequel in 1994, Twin Eagle II: The Rescue Mission, also by SETA.

== Reception ==
In Japan, Game Machine listed Twin Eagle on their May 15, 1988 issue as being the eleventh most-successful table arcade unit of the month.
