= Ayakashi =

Ayakashi may refer to:

- Ayakashi (yōkai), the collective name for yōkai that appear above the surface of some body of water

== Arts and entertainment ==
- Ayakashi (video game), a 2005 video game
- Ayakashi: Samurai Horror Tales, a Japanese anime television series
- Ayakashi Sisters, a group of fictional characters in the manga series Sailor Moon

== See also ==
- Ayakashi Ninden Kunoichiban, a 1997 video game
- Ayakashi no Shiro, a 1990 video game
- Ayakashi Triangle, a Japanese manga series
- Ghost Slayers Ayashi (Tenpō Ibun Ayakashi Ayashi), a Japanese anime television series
