= Arbalester =

1989 video game

- Screen capture of the arcade game showing the game title
- Developer: SETA
- Publisher: SETA
- Platform: Arcade
- Release: 1989
- Genre: Shooter game
- Modes: Single-player, multiplayer

Arbalester (アルバレスタ) is a scrollingshoot 'em up video game developed and published by SETA for arcades. It was licensed to Taito and Romstar. The player controls a fighter jet and shoots enemies in the air and on the ground, collects power-ups, and defeats bosses to advance levels.

== Reception ==
In Japan, Game Machine listed Arbalester on their July 1, 1989 issue as being the seventh most-successful table arcade unit of the month.
