= Magic Darts =

1991 video game

- Cover art
- Developer(s): SETA Corporation
- Publisher(s): JP: SETA Corporation; NA: Romstar
- Platform(s): Nintendo Entertainment System
- Release: JP: April 26, 1991; NA: September 1991
- Genre(s): Sports
- Mode(s): Single-player, Multiplayer

Magic Darts (マジックダーツ, Majikku Dātsu) is a 1991 darts NES game developed by SETA Corporation and published by Romstar in the US and SETA in Japan.

== Gameplay ==
The game allowed for up to four players to play three weights of darts as one of ten characters in six different versions of darts.
