= Tetris 64 =

1998 video game

- Developer: Amtex
- Publisher: SETA
- Series: Tetris
- Platform: Nintendo 64
- Release: JP: November 13, 1998
- Genre: Puzzle
- Modes: Single-player, multiplayer

Tetris 64 (Note: Japanese: テトリス64, Hepburn: Tetorisu 64) is a 1998 puzzle video game developed by Amtex and published by SETA for the Nintendo 64. Released exclusively in Japan, it came packaged with the "Bio Sensor", a unique accessory which alters the gameplay based on the player's heart rate.

== Gameplay ==
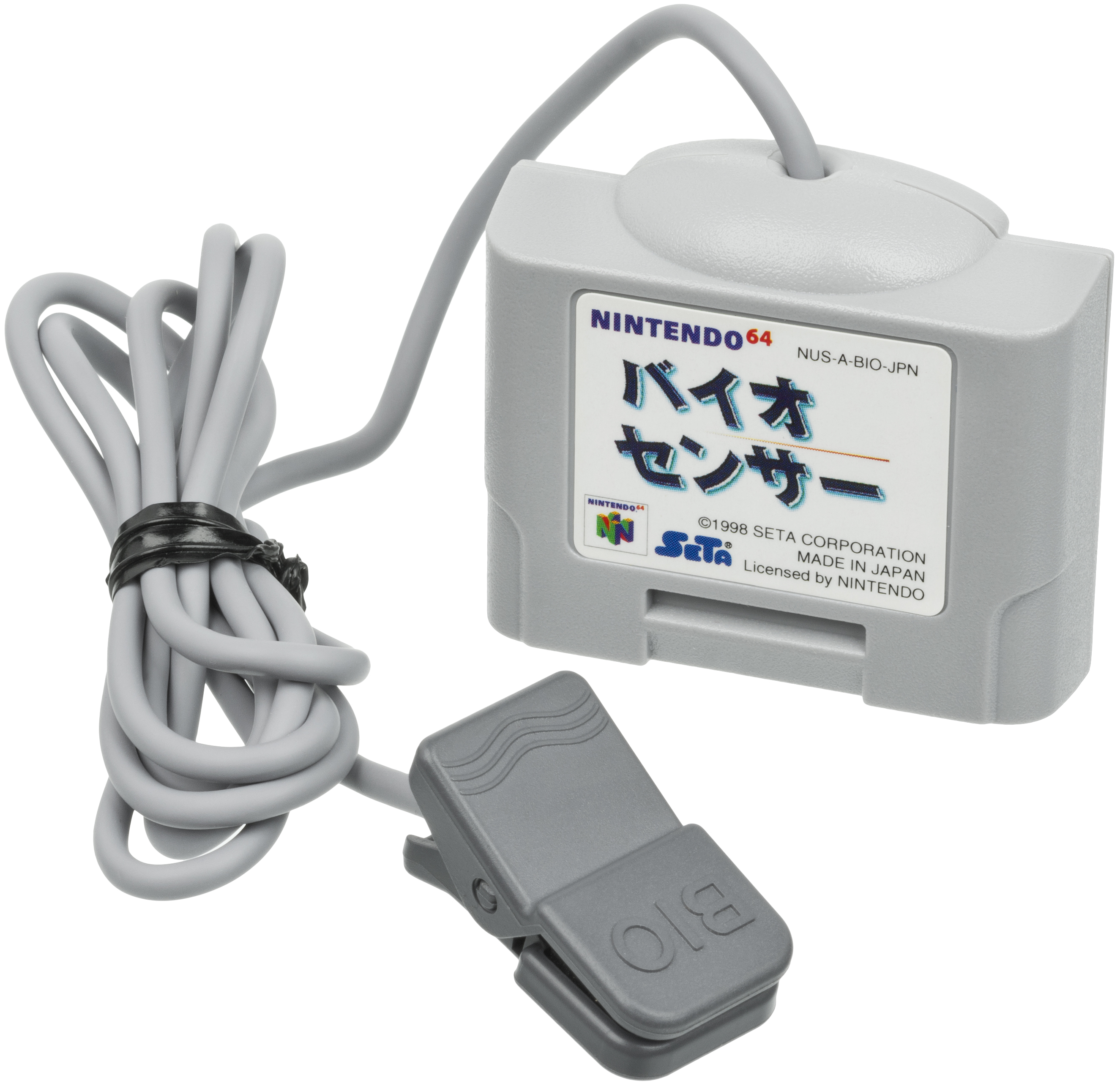
The Nintendo 64 bio sensor

Tetris 64 features three modes of gameplay. The main "Tetris" mode uses standard Tetris gameplay, where players attempt to clear lines using tetriminos falling from the top of the screen to prevent their play area from becoming full. In "Giga Tetris," larger tetriminos fall alongside the standard-sized pieces; when used to clear a line, they break into smaller pieces that fall to fill the gaps below. Both modes support simultaneous multiplayer for up to four players.

The "Bio Tetris" mode utilizes an accessory called the Bio Sensor, which was developed by SETA and packaged with copies of Tetris 64. The Bio Sensor connects to the system through the Nintendo 64 controller's expansion port and analyzes the player's heart rate using a clip that fastens to the player's ear, allowing the game to adapt based on this information. Bio Tetris offers two variations that utilize this feature: Normal, which causes smaller "biotetriminos" arranged in simpler shapes to drop when the player's heart rate is low and more complex shapes to drop when their heart rate rises; and Reverse, which decreases the complexity of the shapes as the player's heart rate increases. Unlike the other modes, Bio Tetris supports multiplayer for only up to two players. Tetris 64 is the only Nintendo 64 game compatible with the Bio Sensor.

Tetris 64 exclusively uses English text in its menus, despite never being released outside of Japan.

== Reception ==
Reception

Review scores
Publication	Score
Famitsu	27/40
IGN	8.4/10
N64 Magazine	42%

Tetris 64 was praised for its multiplayer mode, as it was the only Nintendo 64 Tetris game at the time to support multiplayer for four players; The New Tetris would later incorporate this feature when it was released the following year. Conversely, the game was criticized for its poor graphics and simple backgrounds, which could not match other Tetris games released for the same console, such as Tetrisphere and Magical Tetris Challenge.

Some commentators have drawn retroactive comparisons between the Bio Sensor's functionality in Tetris 64 and the cancelled Wii Vitality Sensor accessory.
