= Thundercade =

1987 video game

- Arcade flyer
- Developers: SETA; Micronics (NES)
- Publishers: JP: Taito; NA: Romstar; NA: Sammy Corporation (NES)
- Platforms: Arcade, Nintendo Entertainment System
- Release: Arcade: NA: 1987; NES: NA: July 1989
- Genre: Scrolling shooter
- Modes: Single-player; Multiplayer

Thundercade, released in Japan as Tokushu Butai U.A.G. (Note: Japanese: 特殊部隊UAG, Hepburn: Tokushu Butai U.A.G.), is a 1987 vertically scrolling shooter video game developed by SETA and published by Taito for arcades. A version for the Nintendo Entertainment System from Sammy Corporation was released in 1989.

Hamster Corporation released the arcade version as part of their Arcade Archives series for the Nintendo Switch and PlayStation 4, as well as their Arcade Archives 2 series for the Nintendo Switch 2, PlayStation 5 and Xbox Series X/S in October 2026.

== Gameplay ==
Gameplay screenshot

Players control a motorcycle equipped with sidecar cannons and backed up by a B-7 bomber. There are four levels in the game: an unnamed city, the terrorists' military base, the woodland regions, and the fortress containing the nuclear power plant. Bosses include a submarine along with other screen-filling enemies.

== Reception ==
In Japan, Game Machine listed Thundercade on their December 15, 1987 issue as being the seventh most-successful table arcade unit of the month.
