= A.S.P. Air Strike Patrol =

1994 video game

- North American cover art
- Developer: Opus
- Publishers: JP/NA: SETA Corporation; EU: System 3
- Director: M. Yoshihara
- Producer: Takayuki Suzuki
- Designers: K. Tamura; T. Kishine
- Programmer: Y. Matsumoto
- Artist: K. Tamura
- Composer: Jun Enoki
- Platform: Super Nintendo Entertainment System
- Release: JP: 18 February 1994; EU: September 1994; NA: January 1995
- Genre: Scrolling shooter
- Mode: Single-player

A.S.P. Air Strike Patrol (Note: Also known as Desert Fighter: Sand Storm Operation (Japanese: デザートファイター：砂の嵐作戦, Hepburn: Dezāto Faitā: Suna no Arashi Sakusen) in Japan and Desert Fighter in Europe.) is an isometric scrolling shooter video game developed by Japanese studio Opus and published by SETA for the Super Nintendo Entertainment System.

== Gameplay ==
Gameplay screenshot.

A.S.P. is a scrolling shooter with gameplay similar to Strike. The game is based somewhat upon the Gulf War. As a pilot in the Air Strike Patrol, the player's aim is to stop Zarak (Iraq) from invading Sweit (Kuwait). The player gains points for judgement in managing resources, attack power and political sensitivity. The total of these determines which text is displayed when the game is finished. The dogfights make the game more diverse and the cheat options, e.g. ability to destroy buildings with the chain gun, give variety. There are various optional targets to destroy on the open map, but the player fails the mission is they take too long.

== Reception ==
Reception

Review scores
Publication	Score
Computer and Video Games	94/100
Electronic Gaming Monthly	7/10, 6/10, 4/10, 4/10, 7/10
Game Informer	8/10
Hyper	85%
Total!	(UK) 71%, (DE) 2
Games World	86/100
Gamestar	84%
Hippon Super!	6/10
Nintendo Game Zone	56/100
SNES Force	92/100
Super Action	92%
Super Gamer	89/100
Super Pro	92/100

A.S.P. Air Strike Patrol received generally favorable reception from critics.
