= The Adventures of Tom Sawyer (video game) =

1989 video game

- North American cover art
- Developer: Winkysoft
- Publisher: SETA
- Platform: NES
- Release: JP: February 6, 1989; NA: August 1989
- Genre: Action
- Modes: Single-player, multiplayer

The Adventures of Tom Sawyer is an action video game for the Nintendo Entertainment System developed by Winkysoft and published in 1989 by SETA. It is based upon the 1876 book The Adventures of Tom Sawyer by Mark Twain.

== Gameplay ==
The Adventures of Tom Sawyer is a platformer similar to The Goonies 1 or 2, wherein one plays as Tom Sawyer. The game is not to be confused with Square's Tom Sawyer. Inexplicably, the level order is changed in the English version (perhaps so as not to confuse players by starting with the rafting stage). The Japanese original's level 5, the pirate ship, is the English version's level 1, making the beginning of the game much more difficult.

== Plot ==
Tom Sawyer is dreaming, and in this dream he must save Becky from Injun Joe, travelling through six stages to get to her. He encounters various creatures, including a giant octopus, a giant alligator in the Mississippi River, ghosts and ghouls in a haunted house, and a dragon. He wakes up from the dream and finds himself in his Missouri classroom, where he finds one feather on his desk that had belonged to Injun Joe. It is never made clear whether or not the events of the game were real.

== Reception ==
Reception

Review score
Publication	Score
Computer Entertainer	6/8
