= Top Speed (video game) =

1987 video game

- North American arcade flyer
- Developer: Taito
- Publishers: WW: Taito; NA: Romstar
- Director: Hiroyuki Sakou
- Designer: Hiroyuki Sakou
- Programmers: Kyouji Shimamoto; Takeshi Murata; Takeshi Ishizashi
- Artist: Hiroyasu Nagai
- Composer: Masahiko Takaki
- Platforms: Arcade, X68000
- Release: NA: August 1987; JP: October 1987; EU: November 1987
- Genre: Racing
- Mode: Single-player

Top Speed , released in Japan as Full Throttle (Note: Japanese: フルスロットル, Hepburn: Furu Surottoru), is a 1987 racing video game developed and published by Taito for arcades. It was released in North America by Romstar in August 1987 and in Japan in October 1987.

Hamster Corporation released the game as part of their Arcade Archives series for the Nintendo Switch and PlayStation 4, as well as their Arcade Archives 2 series for the Nintendo Switch 2, PlayStation 5 and Xbox Series X/S in February 2026.

== Gameplay ==
It is similar in style to the Out Run games in that it features a fast, red car hurtling through the countryside. The key difference in gameplay is the addition of a nitro boost button.

== Reception ==
In Japan, Game Machine listed Full Throttle on their November 15, 1987 issue as being the second most-successful upright arcade unit of the month.

Clare Edgeley of Computer and Video Games gave Top Speed a positive review, comparing it favorably to Out Run and complimented its graphics and smooth handling. Commodore User, on the other hand, rated Full Throttle five out of ten, calling it a clone of Out Run and comparing it unfavorably to Sega's game.

== Legacy ==
In 2009, Taito reused the Top Speed name for a game intended to be the successor to the Battle Gear series and featuring online multiplayer where players could race against players across arcades. The game was quietly canceled after the location testing concluded.
