= Castle of Dragon =

1989 video game

- Arcade flyer
- Developer: Athena
- Publishers: JP: SETA Corporation; NA: Romstar
- Platforms: Arcade, Nintendo Entertainment System
- Release: JP/NA: August 1989
- Genres: Beat 'em up, platform
- Modes: Single-player, multiplayer

Castle of Dragon (Note: Japanese: キャッスル・オブ・ドラゴン, Hepburn: Kyassuru Obu Doragon) is a 1989 beat 'em up platform video game developed by Athena and published by SETA Corporation for arcades. It was released in Japan in August 1989 and in North America by Romstar the same month. It was ported the Nintendo Entertainment System in the year of 1990; the Japanese version was released by Athena as Dragon Unit.

Hamster Corporation acquired the game's rights alongside Athena's catalogue, releasing the game as part of their Arcade Archives series for the Nintendo Switch and PlayStation 4 in January 2025.

== Story ==
Princess Amoreena has been carried away by a dragon named Zuriv (renamed Dragon Cub in the NES version). The dragon is an evil offspring of a Dragon Master who goes by the name of Darklaza. Setting out to defeat Zuriz, Darklaza and their legions is Geraden, Duke of Menlary. Despite that the arcade and NES versions and have very noticeable distinctions, the overall plot and premise of the two versions have several similarities - with the exception that Darklaza is possibly the true enemy, and only appears in the NES version.

== Gameplay ==
=== Arcade version ===
The arcade version is a two-player co-op that includes a several cutscenes dispersed between the timed six stages. This is a feature that the NES version lacks; the player can acquire various weapons, ranging from a mace, a fire sword, and an axe. Additional items are the Winged Boots for extra speed, and Hourglass that provides extra time, a pair of Gauntlets granting temporary invincibility, and a Suit of Armor that provides recovery from damage. The game's stage structure consist of six stages. The six stages are the Wizard's Castle, Ancient Ruins, Medusa's Lair, Floating Graveyard, Haunted Forest, and Zuriv`s Castle. Four of the stages are completed by defeating a boss, and two of the stages must be completed by finding a key.

=== NES version ===
The NES versions of the game is largely different from the arcade version - primarily by way of weapons, magic, enemy, stage design arrangements, and the lack of time needed to complete the stages. Unlike the arcade version, the NES version has three stages, which are divided into smaller sections. The three stages are the Wenlary Castle, the Heresy Forest, and Darklaza's Castle (which gives the player a choice of selecting, and even replaying all of the sections of Darklaza Castle). Weapons, armor, and magic can only be acquired by defeating a boss/sub-boss in each section - such as an evil wizard, zombie, lizardman, or merman. However, with the exception of armor and mace weapon, all of the items that the player can acquire is temporary. The weapons that can be equipped are the throwing knife, and the mace. The two forms of temporary magic are the fire wave and lightning bolt. The Duke's shield use by simply crouching, while in the arcade version it is used by pressing a separate button. Due to the lack of extra lives, a password feature, or continue option, the NES version offers frustrating levels of difficulty.
