= Rally Bike =

1988 video game

- Arcade flyer
- Developers: Toaplan; Visco Corporation (NES); SPS (X68000)
- Publishers: Taito; NES: JP: Visco Corporation; NA: Romstar; Sharp Corporation (X68000)
- Composer: Osamu Ōta
- Platforms: Arcade, Nintendo Entertainment System, X68000
- Release: Arcade: WW: May 1988; NES: JP: 15 June 1990; NA: September 1990; X68000: JP: 23 May 1991
- Genre: Racing
- Modes: Single-player, multiplayer

Rally Bike (Note: Also known as Dash Rascal (Japanese: ダッシュ野郎, Hepburn: Dash Yarō) in Japan.) is a racing arcade video game originally developed by Toaplan but published and distributed by Taito at its release in May 1988. In Rally Bike, players compete against computer-controlled opponents in races across locations in the United States. Initially released in arcades, the game was ported to the Nintendo Entertainment System and X68000 by different developers.

Rally Bike was met with mixed reception from video game magazines and dedicated outlets that reviewed the game when it launched in arcades and its ports. As of 2019, the rights to the title is owned by Tatsujin, a company founded in 2017 by former Toaplan member Masahiro Yuge and now-affiliate of Japanese arcade manufacturer exA-Arcadia alongside many other Toaplan IPs.

== Gameplay ==
Arcade screenshot

Rally Bike is a top-down motorcycle road racing game where players observe from above and races across six increasingly difficult stages, along with two bonus stages, all taking place in the United States, with the main objective of crossing the finish line and passing an established number of competitors. Along the way, players must also dodge incoming obstacles scattered on the stages to avoid any accident, which causes a great reduction of fuel.

Fuel is a major obstacle of the game as well, as players must refuel their bike by stopping at the filling station, but this will also cause competitors to take advantage, as they never run out of fuel and running out of it results in a game over unless more credits are inserted into the arcade machine to continue playing.

On occasions, a helicopter will come and drop an item to the road during races, ranging from turbo (which can be increased a second time by picking up the turbo item again) to helper bikers that guards the players from crashing against rival racers. In the NES version, a shop mechanic where players can buy new parts to improve their vehicle is introduced after completing each race. The title uses a checkpoint system in which a single player will respawn at the beginning of the checkpoint they managed to reach before crashing.

== Release ==
Rally Bike was released in arcades worldwide in May 1988 by Taito. The soundtrack was composed by Osamu Ōta under the alias "Ree". In June 1989, an album containing music from Rally Bike and other Toaplan games was published exclusively in Japan by Datam Polystar.

== Ports ==
A Nintendo Entertainment System port of Rally Bike developed by Visco Corporation was first released in Japan on June 15, 1990 and later in North America by Romstar on September of the same year. The NES version does not keep the same stages and backgrounds, likely due to hardware limitations. The title later received a faithful conversion to the Sharp X68000 by SPS and only published in Japan by Sharp Corporation on May 23, 1991, although it contains several minor differences when compared to the original version such as the modified aspect ratio, missing animations, among other changes. A Mega Drive conversion was in development alongside Slap Fight MD by M.N.M Software, but was never released.

== Reception and legacy ==
Reception

Review scores
Publication	Score
AllGame	(Arcade) 4/5
Famitsu	(NES) 20 / 40
Oh!X	(X68000) 7/10
Power Play	(Arcade) 66%
Technopolis	(X68000) 3/7

In Japan, Game Machine listed Rally Bike on their July 1, 1988 issue as being the second most-popular arcade game at the time. The game received mixed response from critics since its release in arcades. Commodore User criticized the controls but praised the graphics. Both Robin Hogg and Cameron Pound from The Games Machine commended the presentation, visuals and gameplay but noted the design in later levels to be one of the game's negative points. Andy Smith of ACE regarded the title as "challenging stuff that's bound to appeal to driving and racing fans". Anthony Baize of AllGame deemed it to be a difficult but enjoyable experience.

Other ports of Rally Bike were met with mixed reception from reviewers. Public reception was also mixed: readers of Famimaga voted to give the Nintendo Entertainment System version a 15.75 out of 30 score in a poll. The X68000 version however proved to be relatively popular.

In more recent years, the rights to the game and many other IPs from Toaplan are now owned by Tatsujin, a company named after Truxton's Japanese title that was founded in 2017 by former Toaplan employee Masahiro Yuge, and is part of Embracer Group since 2022.
