= The Wizard of Oz (1993 video game) =

1993 video game

- Developer: Manley & Associates
- Publisher: SETA Corporation
- Director: Ivan Manley
- Designers: Carol Manley; Hans Piwenitzky
- Programmers: Jeff Blazier; James Grundell
- Artists: Jonathan Sposato; Rebecca Coffman
- Composer: Robert Ridihalgh
- Platform: Super NES
- Release: NA: September 1993
- Genre: Platformer
- Mode: Single-player

The Wizard of Oz is a 1993 platform video game released for the Super Nintendo Entertainment System and loosely based on the 1939 film The Wizard of Oz. Developed by Manley & Associates, it was published by SETA Corporation and released in North America in 1993 and in Europe in 1994. The player assumes the role of Dorothy, the Scarecrow, the Tin Man, or the Cowardly Lion in a series of levels containing hidden areas, mazes, and puzzles to bring Glinda's magic ruby slippers to the Wizard of Oz.

Upon its release, it received generally positive reviews for its graphics, challenge, and playable female heroine. Retrospective coverage, however, has been negative including ranking on lists of the worst games of all time. Criticisms include poor collision detection, controls, weak character attacks, and mishandling of the source material.

== Gameplay ==
Dorothy throwing shooting stars from her wand while on a yellow brick road.

The Wizard of Oz is a side-scrolling platformer that mixes action, adventure, and puzzle video game styles. It consists of four worlds, each having levels that contain warp zones, mazes, secret areas, and puzzles. It includes many of the settings from the 1990 Wizard of Oz animated series by DIC Entertainment. In a total of 31 levels, the player obtains six tickets from each country to open the Emerald City's four gates and complete the game. Bricks are collected to fill gaps with bridges to enter the next country.

The warp zones contain special items that are harder to obtain in other areas. To enter a puzzle stage, the player collects Toto's snack bones throughout a level. Puzzle levels include "Scrambled Concentration" where Toto must match three icons; "Toto vs" where Toto has to get to the "End" emerald while dodging enemies like mice and lobsters; "Follow the Path" where the player is forced to move on set arrow tiles to get Toto to the "End" emerald; "Lemon Drop Elimination", where Toto rolls two dice and must choose a number tile that is the sum of the numbers on the dice; and a word game where Toto has to enter out a phrase. Jewel icons can be collected to give any character the ability to shoot three jewels per icon in an upward or downward angle, and characters can be changed during gameplay by pressing the select button.

Players can assume the role of any of the four characters with different abilities; the game starts the player with Dorothy, who must rescue the other characters along the way. Each character has a different attack; Dorothy has a kick and a wand that can be powered up with bubbles and shooting stars; the Scarecrow strikes with a pitchfork and scares away crow enemies; the Tin Man has a low-kick and a high ax chop; and the Cowardly Lion attacks with his claws. Each protagonist also has special methods of maneuvering through levels, as Dorothy can float in the air for a limited amount of time through obtaining "flying slippers"; the straw-made Scarecrow can trudge through mud and stand on thin branches; the Lion can climb objects; and the Tin Man can walk safely in swamp liquid. For collecting extra lives and health points, there are icons that only serve specific characters: Glinda's bubble and a blue bow for Dorothy's health points and lives, respectively; a haystack for the Scarecrow's health and a graduation cap to increase his lives; oil cans and hearts for the Tin Man's health points and lives, respectively; and tofus and medals for the vegetarian Cowardly Lion.

== Development and release ==
GamePro announced in June 1992 that SETA U.S.A. was planning to release a set of games based on the 1939 film The Wizard of Oz, with one for the Super Nintendo Entertainment System reported to be released in early 1993. The magazine revealed that Dorothy, the Tin Man, the Scarecrow, and the Cowardly Lion were playable characters; a rendition of "Over the Rainbow" would be included in the soundtrack; and that anybody could submit ideas for the game by contacting the SETA's Las Vegas address. Another version for the Nintendo Entertainment System was announced in September 1992, and was reported to be in development by Electronic Gaming Monthly from December 1992 to July 1993; however, there were no reports about it afterward.

SETA first presented the SNES game at the 1993 winter Consumer Electronics Show (CES), and the finished version at the 1993 summer CES and 1994 winter CES. Just before its North American release, it was previewed in VideoGames & Computer Entertainment and GamePro. Its sprites were featured as "Stamp Out Famous Faces" in the stamp feature section of the Nintendo Player's Guide for Mario Paint (1993). In North America, the "early 1993" release date was moved to September 1993 in April. In Europe, the game was originally planned to be released in early 1994 and was moved to April, but ultimately was not released in the region.

== Reception ==
Reception (SNES)

Review scores
Publication	Score
AllGame	1.5/5
Game Players	57%
GamePro	4/5; 3.5/5; 3.5/5; 3/5
Nintendo Power	3.1/5; 2.9/5; 2.6/5; 3.2/5
Video Games (DE)	60%
VideoGames & Computer Entertainment	7/10
Super Pro	49/100

=== Contemporaneous ===
Upon release, The Wizard of Oz received generally positive reviews—with the Associated Press calling it the best film-to-video-game adaptation ever. The graphics were especially highlighted and some liked the music. The Associated Press praised its "excellent" animation, "detailed original background graphics, and big character graphics". Data Carvey of GamePro admired the colorfulness, Mode 7 effects, multi-layered scrolling backgrounds, and the "distinctive details" and personality of the "somewhat stiff-moving" character sprites. Sam Hickman of Super Pro opined that more detail was needed in the "fairly well drawn" backgrounds.

Carvey and Nintendo Power praised the challenging gameplay; Nintendo Power highlighted the use of secret items and places, and Carvey commended its "imaginative enemies and some big bad bosses". Reviewers liked the playable female protagonist, with the Los Angeles Times recommending it for girl players to practice problem-solving and hand-eye coordination "in a setting they know and love".

The film license was criticized; Billy R. Moon of Game Players criticized "real action scenes" like the tornado sequence and Dorothy's visit to Munchkinland being reduced to either brief cutscenes or levels featuring elements not from the film. Hickman noted the munchkins and "jolly singing" was replaced by enemies like "a few dumb looking cats" and that Dorothy looked more like Ma Larkin from The Darling Buds of May (1991–1993) than the "dainty young teenager” in the film.

Moon said The Wizard of Oz left the SNES's capabilities unfulfilled, and Hickman assumed it would fail to attract its young demographic due to its scarcity of short-term rewards, its high difficulty, and its lack of appealing details. Nintendo Power's positive review admitted hit detection problems and the top screen display blocking the view of enemies. Carvey suggested the game could have used more sound effects and playable characters that were "speedy and versatile". Other criticisms included the gameplay, for its lack of variety and being reminiscent of THQ's video game adaptation of Home Alone (1990); and the "annoying" and "muddy" music making the famous songs difficult to identify.

=== Retrospective ===
What we have is a terrible idea for a game, based on a movie that predated video games, incorporating stuff for an animated series nobody watched.

— Gambit magazine, 2017

Wizard of Oz was far less well received in later years, ranking on several lists of the worst games of all time. This includes The Verge naming it one of the top five worst film adaptations on the Super NES, Screen Rant ranking it the tenth worst film-based video game of all time, The Gamer ranking it the fourth worst, The Things placing it number six on its list of worst games based on children's properties, and Gambit magazine ranking it the fifth worst Super NES game. Frequent criticisms include the controls, poor collision and hit detection, weak character attacks (except for the Tin-Man), and addition of elements unrelated to the film.

Johnny Reynolds of The Things and Brett Alan Weiss of AllGame were baffled by Tin-Man's inability to jump in a platform game, and Weiss also criticized Dorothy's ineffective kick. Regarding changes from the source material, Gambit magazine's J. Luis bashed the inclusion of settings from the 1990 animated series in a game that was marketed as based on the 1939 film. Thomas Dennett of The Gamer wrote, "We don't remember Dorothy leaping across tree tops collecting fruit, kicking woodland creatures in the head, and carrying around a magic wand." Weiss dismissed the "poor level design that invites ridicule for being both too easy and too frustrating", and its audio that consists of "sparse" sound effects and "butchered" rendition of songs from the film.

Positive comments have been sparse, with Paste magazine claiming in 2015 that the game was "pretty good by 1993 license tie-in standards". Weiss called the visuals "decent"; and Screen Rant's Stuart JA saw potential in some of the gameplay concepts, such as where it "arms Dorothy with a laser-blasting magic wand, Prince of Persia-style jumping prowess and the power to brutally kick her enemies to death". In a July 2011 feature for Retro Gamer, Richard Burton labeled it "A playable and enjoyable arcade adventure" with "sickly sweet graphics" that were "pleasant and attractive enough"; however, he also said that the game would be forgotten if not for the Oz license.
