= QBillion =

1989 video game

- Japanese cover art
- Developer: Winkysoft
- Publisher: SETA Corporation
- Platform: Game Boy
- Release: JP: December 22, 1989; NA: April 1990
- Genres: Puzzle; Strategy
- Mode: Single-player

QBillion (キュービリオン) is a puzzle video game for the Nintendo Game Boy. It was released by SETA Corporation in 1990.

In QBillion, you control a mouse that, for reasons that are left unclear, has to reduce stacks of blocks to units one block high. This is represented by a grid in which several squares have numbers, representing how many blocks are there. The player can move a single block around, or push a block down off a stack. However, to push a block the player must be standing on a block one level lower than the block - i.e. to push a block off the top of a three-block stack, the player must be standing on a two-block stack.
