= Makoto Kitayama =

- Born: Japan
- Genres: Progressive rock, experimental rock
- Occupation(s): Musician, songwriter
- Instrument(s): Vocals, keyboards, guitar
- Years active: 1960s-present
- Labels: Musea

Makoto Kitayama (born 1952) is a Japanese musician, active since the late '60s, most notably as vocalist and songwriter for the progressive rock band Shingetsu.

After Shingetsu folded at the end of the seventies, Kitayama has released two solo albums: the instrumental, keyboard-dominated, "Doubutsukai No Chinou" in 1982 (re-released in 2004) and the progressive rock outing "Hikaru Sazanami" in 1998. "Practical Encyclopedia of Kingdom Plantae" was released in 2008, and is the second part of a planned trilogy that started with his debut solo album, inspired by a book series from 1932. He's helped here by Takashi HAYASHI, the leader and guitarist of Qui.

== See also ==
- Shingetsu
