= Chopper Attack =

1997 video game

- North American Nintendo 64 cover art
- Developer: SETA Corporation
- Publishers: JP: SETA Corporation; NA: Midway; EU: GT Interactive
- Platform: Nintendo 64
- Release: JP: November 28, 1997; NA: June 16, 1998; EU: September 1, 1998
- Genre: Third-person shooter
- Mode: Single-player

Chopper Attack, known as Wild Choppers (ワイルドチョッパーズ, Wairudo Choppāzu) in Japan, is a third-person helicopter-based shooting game developed by SETA Corporation for the Nintendo 64. It was released in 1997 in Japan and 1998 in other regions.

== Gameplay ==
In Chopper Attack, players control a helicopter and complete a series of missions in various environments. The objectives include bombing enemy bases, escorting Air Force One through dangerous areas, and rescuing prisoners of war. Each mission is time-sensitive, adding a level of urgency to the gameplay.

Players earn points based on their performance, such as the number of enemies destroyed, damage avoided, and how many allied units survive. The game allows players to choose between different helicopters and weapons, making each mission replayable with different strategies.

== Development ==
Chopper Attack was showcased at the November 1996 Shoshinkai expo in Japan, where it drew attention for its intense helicopter combat and variety of missions. Originally, the game was planned to feature a two-player split-screen mode. However, this feature was removed before the final release.

== Reception ==
Reception

Aggregate score
Aggregator	Score
GameRankings	54.27%

Review scores
Publication	Score
AllGame	2.5/5
Edge	6/10
Electronic Gaming Monthly	2.5/10, 6/10, 5.5/10, 5.5/10
Famitsu	7/10, 7/10, 7/10, 9/10
Game Informer	5.25/10
GameFan	80/100, 83/100, 75/100
GameRevolution	D
GameSpot	6.4/10
Hyper	76/100
IGN	5.6/10
N64 Magazine	79%, 81%
Nintendo Power	6.6
Official Nintendo Magazine	79%
64 Magazine	72%, 79%
N64 Pro	58%
Q64	4/10
Total Control	41%

Chopper Attack received mixed reception from critics, holding a rating of 54.27% based on ten reviews according to review aggregator GameRankings.
