= Silva Saga II: The Legend of Light and Darkness =

1993 video game

- Cover art
- Developer: SETA
- Publisher: SETA
- Composers: Katsuhisa Ishida; Masanao Akahori; Jun Enoki
- Platform: Super Famicom
- Release: JP: June 25, 1993
- Genre: Role-playing video game
- Mode: Single-player

Silva Saga II: The Legend of Light and Darkness (シルヴァ・サーガ２) is a role-playing video game developed and published by SETA Corporation, which was released exclusively in Japan in 1993. It is a direct sequel to Silva Saga for the Family Computer.

The player will find similarities with Dragon Quest. Players search out the soldier of light who travels on a journey to defeat the Zolde, son of the Zuhl. Up to 12 mercenaries and deity statues can be combined as well as organized.

== Story ==
The story starts a few days before Silva Saga's ending. The main character is an amnesiac who goes on a quest to discover his identity and to try and save Kyral, the Light Warrior and main protagonist of the prior game from the game's main antagonist, Zolde.

== Gameplay ==
While exploring dungeons, players must be aware of treasure chests found throughout the building.

Although the game shares similarities with the Dragon Quest series, there are some noticeable differences. That being the mercenary and idol battle system. In the game, the player is given the chance to buy mercenaries (up to four) and find idols (up to four as well) to add to your party. In battle, the player is allowed to trade out the main party to bring in the mercenary party or idol party. The mercenary party cannot use spells but are very strong offensively and defensively. Unlike the mercenary party, idols are weak in both offense and defense but are very powerful with magic. Both parties cannot be controlled manually by the player.

== Minelvaton series ==
Silva Saga 2 is the third game in a trilogy of role playing games. The series started with Minelvaton Saga: Ragon no Fukkatsu, continued with Silva Saga, and ended with Silva Saga 2. Unlike many other role playing games, the Minelvaton series takes place within one world, Minelvaton, and players are able to re-explore towns and dungeons from all three titles.

== Translation ==
The game was released for the first time in English on January 24, 2012 from fan translation group Dynamic-Designs.
