= Scramble Formation =

1986 video game

- Arcade flyer
- Developer: Taito
- Publishers: JP: Taito; NA: Romstar
- Platforms: Arcade, MSX2
- Release: Arcade: JP: April 23, 1986; NA: May 1986; MSX2: JP: August 28, 1987
- Genre: Scrolling shooter
- Modes: Single-player, multiplayer
- Arcade system: Taito Bubble Bobble

Scramble Formation (Note: Japanese: スクランブル・フォーメーション, Hepburn: Sukuranburu Fōmēshon) is a 1986 vertically scrolling shooter video game developed and published by Taito for arcades. It was released in Japan in April 1986 and in North America by Romstar as Tokio in May 1986.

== Gameplay ==
In the game, the player controls a red propeller-driven airplane, flying over the city of Tokyo. They are able to shoot and capture other red, smaller planes, which then will follow the player in formation. The player can choose between 3 formations: the first is able to shoot both air-to-air and air-to-ground projectiles, the second only air-to-air (but on a larger area), the third only air-to-ground (but on a larger area as well). During gameplay, the player should react accordingly to the threats and quickly decide which one of the 3 formation types is more adequate at one given moment.

The game is divided in areas, depicting key places in Tokyo, such as Shinjuku, Akasaka, and Ginza. There are no clearly defined "levels", but at some points the player is faced by a giant mothership, which can be shot down by hitting its engines.

== Ports ==
A port was released for the MSX2 home computer in 1987.

Hamster Corporation released the game as part of their Arcade Archives series for the Nintendo Switch and PlayStation 4 in November 2023.

== Reception ==
In Japan, Game Machine listed Scramble Formation on their May 15, 1986 issue as being the most-successful table arcade unit of the month.
