= Fire Shark =

1989 video game

- Developer: Toaplan
- Publishers: JP/EU: Toaplan; NA: Romstar; KOR: Dooyong
- Designers: Sanae Nitō; Yuko Tataka
- Artist: Shintarō Nakaoka
- Composer: Masahiro Yuge
- Series: Shark
- Platforms: Arcade, Mega Drive/Genesis
- Release: Arcade: JP: 2 November 1989; EU: Late 1989; NA: March 1990; Mega Drive/Genesis: NA: October 1990; JP: 2 November 1990; EU: April 1992
- Genre: Scrolling shooter
- Modes: Single-player, multiplayer

Fire Shark (Note: Also known as Same! Same! Same! (Japanese: 鮫! 鮫! 鮫!(サメ! サメ! サメ!); "Shark! Shark! Shark!") in Japan.) is a 1989 vertically scrolling shooter arcade video game developed and published by Toaplan in Japan and Europe, and by Romstar in North America. It is the sequel to Flying Shark, a game released in 1987 on multiple platforms. Set in the year 1991, the game focuses on a mysterious armada launching a worldwide attack from a small island in the Mediterranean Sea. Players take control of the titular biplane to counterattack the enemy's forces.

Fire Shark was ported in-house to the Mega Drive/Genesis and published worldwide by DreamWorks, Toaplan and Sega between 1990 and 1992. The console launch featured various changes compared with the original release. A conversion for the X68000 was developed but never released. The game was well received in arcades across Western regions where reviewers commended its graphics, sound and gameplay, but it proved to be less popular in Japan due to the high difficulty level. The Mega Drive/Genesis version was also met with mostly positive reviews from critics across multiple regions.

== Gameplay ==
Arcade version screenshot

Fire Shark is a military-themed vertically scrolling shoot 'em up game reminiscent of 1942, where players take control of the titular biplane through ten increasingly difficult levels in order to defeat an assortment of enemy forces like tanks, battleships, kamikaze monoplanes and artillery from the mysterious Strange Fleet armada. This is the main objective of the game. The game plays similarly like its predecessor, as players control their craft over a constantly scrolling background and the scenery never stops moving until an airport is reached. Players have two weapons at their disposal: the standard shot that travels a max distance of half the screen's height and bombs capable of obliterating any enemy caught within its blast radius.

There are three types of weapons to pick up that appear as colored icons by destroying zeppelins: a wide shot, a laser beam and a flamethrower. There are also other items like "S" icons that increases the overall speed, "B" icons that acts as extra bomb stocks, "P" icons and 1UPs on rare occasions. By acquiring three "P" icons in a row, players increase their plane's firepower to one level, with the third power level being the highest. Once the plane is fully powered up, grabbing additional icons grants extra points instead. Reaching high-scores is also crucial to obtain extra lives, which are obtained at certain score values. Players can grab lightning-shaped medals for points by destroying containers on the playfield.

Depending on the settings in the arcade version, the title uses either a checkpoint system in which a downed single player will start off at the beginning of the checkpoint they managed to reach before dying, or a respawn system where their ship immediately starts at the location they died at. Getting hit by enemy fire will result in losing a life, as well as a penalty of decreasing the ship's firepower and speed to his original state and once all lives are lost, the game is over unless the players insert more credits into the arcade machine to continue playing. Once all ten stages are complete, the game loops back to the first stage after completing the last stage as with previous titles from Toaplan, with each one increasing the difficulty and enemies fire denser bullet patterns.

== Plot ==
The plot summary of Fire Shark varies between each region and version. In the original arcade version, a mysterious enemy fleet known only as the Strange Fleet arrived at a small island of the Mediterranean Sea during one summer night in 1991, with few people noticing its sudden arrival. In the span of two years, the Strange Fleet grew larger and larger, culminating in a worldwide attack as a result. As the Strange Fleet continues their assault, those who oppose them cried "Fire Shark! Fire Shark! It's time to take-off!! Beat them for our sake. Go! Go! Fire Shark!". In the Sega Genesis port, the game takes place in the year 19X9 on an alternate version of Earth instead, where a global superpower known only as the S Corps, which specializes in a heavy industrial army begins invading various countries all across the world, with any and all hope that's seemingly lost until a phantom pilot flying a super-powered biplane code named Fire Shark flies in to save the world from the evil S-Corps and foil their plans for world domination.

== Development ==
Most of the artwork were hand-drawn sketches created by the development team before being transposed to pixel art graphics.

Fire Shark's development process and history was recounted between 1989 and 2012 through Japanese publications such as Shooting Gameside by former Toaplan composer Masahiro Yuge. Yuge acted as the game's composer, with Shintarō Nakaoka serving as artist, while both Sanae Nitō and Yuko Tataka were also involved in the production as designers, though none of the members in the development team were credited as such in neither version of the game.

The team wanted to convey "the same strengths" as its predecessor, Flying Shark, by adding elements like the flamethrower as a way to promote the game, with Yuge stating that the weapon acted as a successor to the blue laser in 1989's Truxton. Yuge later stated that he regretted not balancing the game's difficulty for both arcade owners and players. The development team settled on using the word "same" when coming up for the project's title, which translates to "shark" in Japanese to convey a strong animal sound. Nakaoka was also responsible for drawing the crowd during the takeoff sequence at the beginning of the game that was, according to Yuge, later animated during their leisure for diversion.

== Release ==
Fire Shark was first released in arcades by Toaplan in Japan on 2 November 1989, then in Europe later the same year, followed by a North American release by Romstar in March 1990. In October 1989, an album containing music from the title was co-published exclusively in Japan by Scitron and Pony Canyon. In October 1990, a Sega Genesis port of Fire Shark developed in-house by Toaplan was first released in North America by DreamWorks, which was a division of Toy Soldiers, Inc. It was released for the Mega Drive in Japan by Toaplan on 2 November of the same year, while Sega published it in Europe in April 1992. The port is faithful to the original arcade release and includes a harder difficulty setting but has a number of key differences, such as a smaller color palette that led to sprites being recolored in different ways, along with other presentation and gameplay changes from the original version. To promote the Mega Drive version, a TV advert was aired in Japan. A version for the X68000 was in development and planned to be published by Kaneko, but was never released despite being advertised in Japanese publications such as Oh!X.

The Mega Drive/Genesis port was later re-released by independent publisher Retro-Bit in 2020. In 2022, the arcade version was included in the Hishou Same! Same! Same! compilation for Nintendo Switch and PlayStation 4 as part of M2's Toaplan Arcade Garage label. The arcade original was included as part of the Sega Astro City Mini V, a vertically oriented variant of the Sega Astro City mini console.

== Reception ==
Reception

Review scores
Publication	Score
AllGame	(Arcade) 3.5/5 (Genesis) 2.5/5
Computer and Video Games	(Mega Drive) 90%
Electronic Gaming Monthly	(Genesis) 33/40
Famitsu	(Mega Drive) 31/40
Aktueller Software Markt	(Mega Drive) 8/12
Beep! Mega Drive	(Mega Drive) 33/40
CVG Mean Machines	(Mega Drive) 71%
Gamers	(Mega Drive) 2-
Génération 4	(Mega Drive) 6/10 (Mega Drive) 88%
HobbyConsolas	(Mega Drive) 79%
Joypad	(Mega Drive) 78%
Joystick	(Mega Drive) 71%
Mega	(Mega Drive) 78%
Mega Drive Advanced Gaming	(Mega Drive) 68% (Mega Drive) 53%
Mega Force	(Mega Drive) 11/20
MegaTech	(Mega Drive) 59%
Micromanía	(Mega Drive) 44/60
Play Time	(Mega Drive) 56%
Player One	(Mega Drive) 51%
Power Play	(Mega Drive) 59%
Raze	(Mega Drive) 87%
Sega Force	(Mega Drive) 61%
Sega Power	(Mega Drive) 3/5 (Mega Drive) 63%
Sega Pro	(Mega Drive) 83% (Mega Drive) 90% (Mega Drive) 75%
Superjuegos	(Mega Drive) 70%
Zero	(Mega Drive) 74%

Award
Publication	Award
Gamest Mook (1998)	Best Shooting Award 8th, Annual Hit Game 34th (Arcade)

In Japan, Game Machine listed Fire Shark on their January 1, 1990 issue as being the fifth most-successful table arcade unit at the time. According to Masahiro Yuge, Fire Shark was well received in Western arcades but proved to be less popular in Japan due to its high difficulty.

German magazine Power Play compared it with 1943: The Battle of Midway and Vapor Trail: Hyper Offence Formation.

The Mega Drive/Genesis version was well received when it was released, earning a score of 33 out of 40 in Electronic Gaming Monthly.

== Legacy ==
The rights to Fire Shark, its predecessor and many other IPs from Toaplan are now owned by Tatsujin, a company named after Truxton's Japanese title that was founded in 2017 by former Toaplan employee Masahiro Yuge, and is part of Embracer Group since 2022. Artist Perry "Gryzor/Rozyrg" Sessions cited Fire Shark as one of the main influences for Super XYX.
