= Minelvaton Saga: Ragon no Fukkatsu =

1987 video game

- Cover art
- Developer(s): Random House
- Publisher(s): Taito
- Composer(s): Yō Ōyama; Haruhiko Tsuda
- Platform(s): Family Computer
- Release: JP: October 23, 1987
- Genre(s): Role-playing
- Mode(s): Single-player

Minelvaton Saga: Ragon no Fukkatsu (ミネルバトンサーガ ラゴンの復活, Minelvaton Saga: Ragon's Revival) is a role playing game published by Taito for the Family Computer. It is the first game in the Minelvaton series, being followed by Silva Saga and ending with Silva Saga II: The Legend of Light and Darkness.

A tribute CD Minelvaton Saga Tribute was published in 2009.

== Plot ==
Minelvaton Saga takes place on the world Minelvaton, in the area known as Southern Ofelia. In the kingdom of Palmeccia both the King and Queen have been murdered by the hands of a servant of Ragon, son of the Zuhl. The player takes control of the Prince of Palmeccia in a quest for revenge and to kill the evil Ragon.

== Gameplay ==
In the first few minutes of gameplay, Minelvaton Saga plays and looks like Dragon Quest: an open-world role-playing game with top-down perspective. As soon as a battle starts, though, the fundamental difference becomes apparent: Minelvaton Saga is an action-based RPG, while Dragon Quest is a turn-based RPG. However, the two sequels Silva Saga I and II feature turn-based combat.

The player is given control of a single character and can explore a number of towns, dungeons, and the world surface itself. Once the player receives the ship for sailing, the game world becomes truly open, as the player can explore almost anywhere that can be reached.

Like a typical role-playing game, there are random battles, but actual combat is action-based. In battle, the player starts at the bottom of the screen facing the enemies that are at the top. In order to defeat enemies, the player must run into one in order to exchange blows. This system was already used in other early series of Japanese role-playing games, e.g. Xanadu: Dragon Slayer II and the Ys series.

Beyond that, the basic plot and some of the battle system concept seems to have been co-opted by Sega's Sword of Vermilion.

== Credits ==
- Writer?: Ramon Yūto
- Design Works (Illustrator?): Hitoshi Yoneda
- Music: Yō Ōyama (leader of the progressive rock band ASTURIAS), Haruhiko Tsuda (guitarist of Shingetsu)

== Legacy ==
Although never released outside Japan, the game was fan translated to English in 2011.
