= Romstar =

American video game publisher

Romstar Inc.
- Predecessor: SNK Electronics (US branch, first version)
- Founded: 1984; United States
- Founder: Takahito Yasuki
- Defunct: 1994
- Fate: Merged with Capcom USA
- Successor: GameStar; Capcom Coin-Op
- Headquarters: Torrance, California, United States
- Key people: Ron Czerny; Darryl Williams; John Rowe

Romstar Inc. was an American video game publisher based in Torrance, California that started operations in 1984. They were known for licensing arcade games from major makers for distribution. They also made games for the Nintendo Entertainment System, the Super Nintendo Entertainment System, and Game Boy.

== History ==
The company started as the first American distribution arm for SNK (before SNK of America was founded in 1987). Romstar partnered with Capcom in 1993 to form Game Star (a.k.a. GameStar Inc.), an electromechanical factory in Arlington Heights, Illinois that Romstar had a 30% stake in. Games continued to be released using the Romstar name until at least 1994.

In 1995, Capcom would later fully take over Game Star to form Capcom Coin-Op, a pinball manufacturer.

The key personnel of Romstar, Takahito Yasuki, Ron Czerny, and Darryl Williams, later founded Atrativa Games and Playphone, both cellular phone entertainment companies. Playphone was acquired by GungHo Online Entertainment in October 2014.

== Clients ==
Among Romstar's clients include Taito, Capcom, SNK, Toaplan, and Seta.

== List of Games Distributed by Romstar ==
=== Licensed from Taito ===
- Tiger Heli (developed by Toaplan)
- Arkanoid
- Bubble Bobble
- Arkanoid: Revenge of DOH
- Twin Cobra (developed by Toaplan)
- Sky Shark (developed by Toaplan)
- Empire City: 1931 (developed by Seibu Kaihatsu)
- Aqua Jack
- Twin Eagle (developed by Seta, NES version)
- Battle Lane Vol. 5 (developed by Technos)
- Final Blow
- Rally Bike (developed by Toaplan, NES)
- Top Speed
- Kageki (developed by Kaneko)
- Tokio
- China Gate (developed by Technos)
- Thundercade (developed by Seta)
- Super Qix (developed by Kaneko)
- The Ninja Warriors
- Kickstart
- Great Swordsman (developed by Allumer)
- Tournament Arkanoid

=== Licensed from Capcom ===
- 1942 (also distributed by Williams)
- Ghosts 'n Goblins (also distributed by Taito)
- Side Arms: Hyper Dyne
- Trojan
- Black Tiger
- Gun.Smoke
- Tiger Road
- F-1 Dream
- The King of Dragons
- Varth: Operation Thunderstorm
- SonSon

=== Licensed from SNK ===
- Baseball Stars 2 (NES version)
- Time Soldiers (developed by Alpha Denshi)
- Sky Soldiers (developed by Alpha Denshi)
- Gold Medalist (developed by Alpha Denshi)
- Neo Geo (One-slot conversion kit version)

=== Licensed from Seta ===
- Castle of Dragon (developed by Athena)
- DownTown
- Caliber .50
- Thunder & Lightning (developed by Visco, NES)
- Meta Fox (developed by Jorudan)
- Nolan Ryan's Baseball (SNES)

=== Licensed from Toaplan ===
- Out Zone
- Snow Bros.
- Fire Shark

=== Others ===
- Double Dragon II: The Revenge (developed by Technos)
- Bloody Wolf (developed by Data East)
- Flashgal (developed by Kyugo, published by Sega)
- Skeet Shot (developed by Dynamo, top new video game on RePlay arcade charts in December 1991)
- Popshot (prototype, developed by Dynamo)
- World Bowling (developed by Athena, Game Boy)
- Championship Bowling (Arcade/NES)
- Cowboy Kid (developed by Visco Games, NES)
- Magic Darts (NES)
- Mr. Chin's Gourmet Paradise (Game Boy)
- Torpedo Range (developed by Seta, Game Boy)
- Goofy Hoops (redemption, partially based on same hardware as Capcom pinballs)
