= Ayakashi no Shiro =

1990 video game

- Cover art
- Platform: Game Boy
- Release: JP: May 25, 1990
- Genre: Role-playing
- Mode: Single player

Ayakashi no Shiro (あやかしの城; lit. 'Castle of Ayakashi') is a 1990 role-playing video game for the Game Boy manufactured by SETA Corporation. It was never published outside Japan.

== Gameplay ==
Ayakashi no Shiro is a turn-based dungeon crawler. Players move the protagonist through first-person dungeons where randomly occurring battles happen. When combat begins, the player is given several options through a menu system to fight the enemies.

== Release and reception ==
Reception

Review score
Publication	Score
Famitsu	5/10, 5/10, 6/10, 5/10

Ayakashi no Shiro was released in Japan for the Game Boy on May 25, 1990.

Four reviewers for the Japanese gaming publication Famicom Tsūshin reviewed the game in 1990. While on reviewer said the game initially started easy and user-friendly, towards the middle the battles became just an excuse to level up the player which grew tedious. Another reviewer found there was a lack of variety in the enemies fought which led to them growing monotonous.

Two reviewers felt the game lacked the depth of similar role-playing video games like Wizardry (1987) for the Family Computer.
