= Shingetsu =

Japanese music band

- Shingetsu performing in ABC Kaikan Hall Tokyo, on July 25–26, 1979 (cover for "Shingetsu Live Akaime").

Background information
- Origin: Japan
- Genres: Progressive rock, symphonic rock
- Years active: 1976–1981; 2005–present
- Labels: Victor, Musea, Zen, Belle Antique
- Members: Haruhiko Tsuda; Akira Hanamoto; Yoko Ueno; Miki Naoe; Toshimichi Isoe; Tomoyoku Tanimoto; Ako Ozawa; Hiroshi Ishibata; Masayuki Adaniya; A*mu
- Past members: Makoto Kitayama; Shizuo Suzuki; Naoya Takahashi; Yoichi Kamada; Yoshiyuki Sakurai; Masayuki Takatsu; Kiyoo Suzuki; Hiroyoshi Komatsu; Kayo Matsumoto Takashi Kokubo
- Website: shingetsu.tv

Shingetsu (Japanese: 新月) is a Japanese progressive rock band from the 1970s. A band with an originally short career, they have typically been categorised as one of the most notable Japanese progressive rock bands.

Shingetsu ('new moon') arrived in the Japanese music scene on the late 1970s. Led by the "Japanese Peter Gabriel", Makoto Kitayama (recognized for his deep, wavering, mournful vocals), Shingetsu's cinematic progressive sound gained comparisons to peak-time Genesis and recognition overseas.

Consisting of Kitayama, Akira Hanamoto, Naoya Takahashi, Shizuo Suzuki and Haruhiko Tsuda, the band only produced one studio album in their first run, followed in later years by two live albums, which nevertheless featured some unreleased performances. In 2015 they released an album titled From A Distant Star (originally recorded in 2005), which features songs they had written before breaking up in 1981, and a studio demo they had recorded after completing their first album in 1979.

Their studio album, the eponymous Shingetsu, often considered as a masterpiece of symphonic prog, is abundant in musical arrangements: the tasteful use of soft organ/synth soundscapes, Mellotron, and 12-string guitar passages reminiscent of the UK bands of the 1970s, while Kitayama's vocals give Shingetsu a distinctive edge from western bands.

The band resumed touring sometime around 2014, under the name "Shingetsu Project". While Makoto no longer tours with the band, he does still engage in studio projects with the band.

== Members ==
=== Current members ===
Shingetsu's line-up
Vocals	Makoto Kitayama
Guitar	Haruhiko Tsuda
Keyboards	Akira Hanamoto
Bass	Shizuo Suzuki
Drums	Naoya Takahashi

=== Collaborated members ===
Collaborations
Takashi Kokubo	Synthesizers Programming and Supporting Keyboards (Live)
Hiroshi Morimura	Saxophone (Track No. 4)

== Discography ==
=== Studio albums ===
- 1979: "Shingetsu" (Zen Records, Victor Entertainment)
- 2016: "From a Distant Star" (Belle Antique) (released in the 2005 and finally eventually released as a studio album in the 2016)

=== Recopilations ===
- 1994: "Akai Me No Kagami: Live '79" (live recopilation)
- 1995: "Night Collector" (科学の夜) (also called "Kagaku No Yoru" and "Serenade")
- 2004: "Live 25-26 July 1979, ABC Kaikan Hall, Tokyo" (live recopilation)
- 2005: "Zenshi" (also called "Shingetsu Zenshi") (compilation album that includes the group only two studio albums, includes the bootleg titled "Out-Takes 1979-1980" and also includes the compilation "Night Collector")

== Disambiguation and meaning ==
Disambiguation for the word shingetsu:

Shingetsu is a shakuhachi honkyoku piece from the Dokyoku repertoire. The word shin means heart, mind, or spirit. The word getsu means moon, which is a symbol for enlightenment or perfection. Thus, the name of the piece can be taken to mean heart moon or spirit perfection or enlightenment of the mind. The piece is the slowest and most quiet in the Dokyoku repertoire.

"Shingetsu" has been recorded by many shakuhachi artists, including Watazumi Doso, Yokoyama Katsuya, and Alcvin Takegawa Ramos.

== See also ==
- Makoto Kitayama
