= SETA Corporation =

Japanese video game company

- Type: Subsidiary
- Industry: Video games
- Founded: October 1, 1985
- Defunct: February 9, 2009
- Fate: Liquidated
- Headquarters: Kōtō, Tokyo, Japan
- Products: Video games; Arcade hardware; Pachinko
- Parent: Aruze (1999–2009)
- Website: www.seta.co.jp/

SETA Corporation (Note: Japanese: 株式会社セタ, Hepburn: Kabushiki gaisha Seta) was a Japanese video game developer and publisher based in Kōtō, Tokyo.

SETA developed and published games for various gaming platforms since the original NES and the Super NES. It produced games primarily in Japan, but also in North America, focusing on golf and puzzles. SETA is commonly recognized for developing a variety of custom hardware to enhance games for Nintendo consoles, including enhancement chips, a modem, and a bio sensor. It created development tools for Nintendo's consoles. SETA also developed the Aleck 64 arcade system, based on the Nintendo 64 console. Additionally, SETA assisted in the production of the SSV arcade system, collaborating with Sammy and Visco.

== History ==
It was founded on October 1, 1985 and dissolved on February 9, 2009. A branch was located in Las Vegas, Nevada.

In 1999, Aruze became the parent company. SETA withdrew from the game business in 2004 after releasing Legend of Golfer on the GameCube. The company announced its closure in December 2008 due to Japan's declining economic conditions. SETA officially closed on January 23, 2009, with Universal Entertainment, through Aruze, absorbing the company's assets. It was subsequently liquidated at the Tokyo District Court on May 25, 2009.

== Subsidiaries ==
=== Former subsidiaries ===
- UD Technology Inc (ユーディテック・ジャパン株式会社): On December 20, 2003, UD Technology Inc announced its merger with SETA Corporation, effective April 1, 2004. The merged entity became the headquarters for SETA Corporation's Unified Communication business.
- IKUSABUNE Co., Ltd. (株式会社企画デザイン工房戦船): Merged into SETA Corporation and became the headquarters for SETA Corporation's Image Contents business on April 1, 2004.

== Video games ==
=== Arcade ===
- U.S. Classic (1987; distributed by Taito in North America, one of America's top eight best-selling arcade games of 1989)
- Arbalester (1989)
- Thunder & Lightning (1990)
- Super Real Mahjong PV (1994; Japan's seventh highest-grossing arcade printed circuit board (PCB) software of 1995)

=== Nintendo Entertainment System ===
- J.B. Harold Murder Club
- The Adventures of Tom Sawyer
- Castle of Dragon (developed by Athena)
- Formula One: Built to Win
- Honshogi: Naitou Kudan Shogi Hiden
- 8 Eyes
- Morita Shogi
- Magic Darts
- Silva Saga
- Bio Force Ape (Unreleased; a prototype version of the unreleased game was recovered and made available online)
- UWC (Unreleased game based on WCW; a review copy was uncovered in 2019)

=== Game Boy ===
- Ayakashi no Shiro
- Battle Bull
- QBillion
- Torpedo Range

=== Super NES/Super Famicom ===
- A.S.P.: Air Strike Patrol
- Cacoma Knight in Bizyland (English version only - Original Japanese version by Datam Polystar)
- F1 ROC: Race Of Champions
- F1 ROC II: Race of Champions
- GD Leen
- Hayazashi Nidan Morita Shogi
- Hayazashi Nidan Morita Shogi 2
- Kendo Rage (Makeruna Makendo) (English version only - Original Japanese version by Datam Polystar)
- Musya: The Classic Japanese Tale of Horror (English version only - Original Japanese version by Datam Polystar)
- Super Stadium
- Nosferatu
- The Wizard of Oz
- Shodan Morita Shogi
- Silva Saga II: The Legend of Light and Darkness
- Super Real Mahjong P4
- Super Real Mahjong P5 Paradise

=== TurboGrafx-16/PC Engine ===
- Super Real Mahjong P5 Custom

=== Nintendo 64 ===
- Chopper Attack
- Eikō no Saint Andrews
- Saikyō Habu Shōgi
- Morita Shogi 64
- Pachinko 365
- Tetris 64
- Ultimate War (cancelled)
- Ide Yosuke no Mahjong Juku

=== PlayStation ===
- Kanazawa Shogi '95

=== Saturn ===
- Shougi Matsuri
- Super Real Mahjong P5
- Super Real Mahjong P6
- Super Real Mahjong P7
- Super Real Mahjong Graffiti
- Kanazawa Shougi
- Real Mahjong Adventure "Umi-He": Summer Waltz

=== GameCube ===
- Legend of Golfer

=== Xbox 360 ===
- Project Sylpheed

=== M65C02 ===
- Cal.50 - Licensed to Taito

=== Macintosh ===
- Super Real Mahjong P4

=== 3DO ===
- Super Real Mahjong P
