= Nintendo 64 =

Home video game console

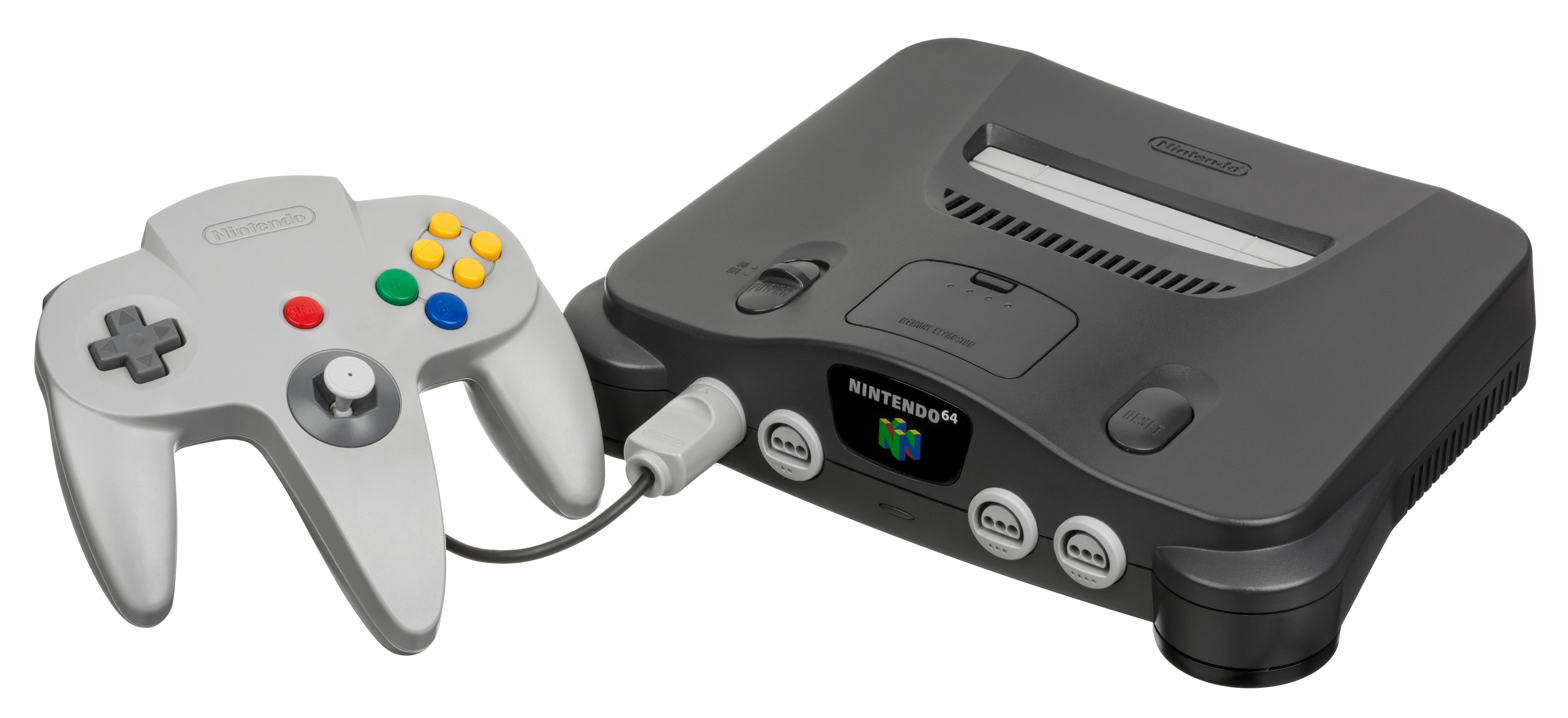
- Charcoal-gray Nintendo 64 Control Deck with solid gray controller
- Codename: Project Reality
- Also known as: Ultra 64 (prerelease title); KOR: Hyundai Comboy 64
- Developer: Nintendo R&D3
- Manufacturer: Nintendo
- Type: Home video game console
- Generation: Fifth
- Released: June 23, 1996: JP: June 23, 1996; NA: September 29, 1996; EU/AU: March 1, 1997; CHL/BR: December 10, 1997
- Introductory price: US$199 (equivalent to $410 in 2025); £249.99 (equivalent to £490 in 2025)
- Discontinued: 2002
- Units sold: WW: 32.93 million (details); NA: 20.63 million; JP: 5.54 million; EU/AU: 6.75 million
- Media: Nintendo 64 Game Pak; 64DD magnetic disc
- CPU: NEC VR4300 @ 93.75 MHz
- Memory: 4 MB RDRAM (8 MB with Expansion Pak)
- Removable storage: 32 KB Controller Pak
- Graphics: SGI RCP @ 62.5 MHz
- Sound: 16-bit, 44.1 kHz stereo; Dolby Pro Logic surround (select games)
- Controller input: Nintendo 64 controller, 4 ports
- Power: Switching supply, 12 & 3.3 V DC
- Online services: JP: Randnet; US: SharkWire Online (third-party)
- Dimensions: 260 × 190 × 73 mm (10.24 × 7.48 × 2.87 in)
- Weight: 1.1 kg (2.43 lb)
- Best-selling game: Super Mario 64 (11.62 million) (list)
- Predecessor: Super Nintendo Entertainment System
- Successor: GameCube
- Related: Nintendo 64DD iQue Player

The Nintendo 64 (Note: Japanese: ニンテンドウ64, Hepburn: Nintendō Rokujūyon; Often stylized in all caps, Nintendo branded the console in Japan by its English name.) (N64) is a home video game console developed and marketed by Nintendo. It was released in Japan on June 23, 1996, in North America on September 29, 1996, and in Europe and Australia on March 1, 1997. It was Nintendo's third major home console, following the Super Nintendo Entertainment System, and competed with Sony's PlayStation and the Sega Saturn in the fifth generation of consoles.

Nintendo began developing the N64 in 1993 in collaboration with Silicon Graphics. Named for its 64-bit CPU, the N64 features a coprocessor that processes graphics and sound separately, allowing for 3D graphics. The N64 controller was the first to include a thumbstick as a standard feature, and the console includes four controller ports for multiplayer games. Accessories include the Expansion Pak to boost system RAM from 4 to 8 MB, the Rumble Pak for force feedback, and the Controller Pak, a memory card. In Japan, Nintendo released the 64DD, a peripheral that adds internet connectivity and enables expanded, rewritable data storage via proprietary magnetic disks. It was a commercial failure and was never released internationally.

The N64 received acclaim for its hardware and technical innovations. The American news magazine Time declared it 1996's "Machine of the Year". Nintendo sold 32.93 million N64s; while it was a major success in North America, it underperformed in Japan and Europe. Nintendo's decision to use ROM cartridges rather than optical discs, citing reduced loading times and software piracy concerns, alienated third-party developers due to cost and storage constraints. Many third parties opted to prioritize PlayStation development. This contributed to a relatively small library of 388 games and required Nintendo to rely on its major first-party franchises such as Mario and The Legend of Zelda, as well as games by second-party developers such as Rare.

The N64 outsold the Saturn, but sold far less than the PlayStation. Nintendo released a successor, the GameCube, on September 14, 2001. It discontinued the N64 in 2002. In retrospect, video game journalists regard the N64 as one of the most iconic game consoles. Several N64 games, such as Super Mario 64 (1996), GoldenEye 007 (1997), Star Fox 64 (1997), and The Legend of Zelda: Ocarina of Time (1998), have been listed by multiple sources as one of the best video games of all time. Nintendo has re-released many N64 games for its subsequent consoles via the Virtual Console and Nintendo Classics services. The N64 was the last major cartridge-based home console until the Nintendo Switch in 2017.

== History ==
=== Background ===
Following the video game crash of 1983, Nintendo revitalized the industry with the release of its second home console, the Family Computer (Famicom), launched in Japan in 1983 and later introduced internationally as the Nintendo Entertainment System (NES) in 1985. Both the NES and its successor, the Super Nintendo Entertainment System (SNES), released in Japan in 1990 and internationally in 1991, achieved significant commercial success. However, SNES sales declined during the Japanese economic recession. At the same time, competition intensified with the arrival of the Sega Saturn, a 32-bit console, which outpaced the aging 16-bit SNES and highlighted the urgency for Nintendo to upgrade its hardware or risk losing market share. Additional competition came from Atari's Jaguar system and the 3DO system.

In an effort to extend the SNES’s lifespan, Nintendo explored the development of a CD-ROM peripheral through partnerships with CD-ROM technology pioneers Philips and Sony. Despite the creation of early hardware prototypes, both collaborations ultimately collapsed, and no games were released by Nintendo or its third-party partners. Philips retained limited licensing rights and used them to release original Mario and Legend of Zelda games on its competing CD-i device. Meanwhile, Sony leveraged its progress to develop what would become the PlayStation console. During this period, third-party developers also expressed growing dissatisfaction with Nintendo’s strict licensing policies.

=== Development ===
Silicon Graphics, Inc. (SGI), a long-established leader in high-performance computing, sought to expand by adapting its supercomputing technology into the higher-volume consumer market, starting with the video game industry. To support this shift, SGI redesigned its MIPS R4000 CPU family, reducing power consumption, and aimed to lower unit cost from up to US$200 (equivalent to $450 in 2025) to approximately $40 (equivalent to $90 in 2025). SGI developed a video game chipset prototype and sought an established industry partner. SGI founder Jim Clark first pitched the concept to Tom Kalinske, CEO of Sega of America, who said they were "quite impressed." However, Sega’s Japanese engineers rejected the design, citing technical issues, which SGI later resolved. Nintendo disputes this account, claiming SGI ultimately favored Nintendo because Sega had demanded exclusive rights to the technology, while Nintendo was open to a non-exclusive licensing agreement.

In early 1993, Clark met with Nintendo president Hiroshi Yamauchi. By August 23, during Nintendo's annual Shoshinkai trade show, the companies announced a joint development and licensing agreement for what they called "Project Reality." They projected an arcade debut in 1994 and a home release by late 1995, targeting a retail price under $250 (equivalent to $530 in 2025). Michael Slater, publisher of Microprocessor Report highlighted the significance of the partnership saying, "The mere fact of a business relationship there is significant because of Nintendo's phenomenal ability to drive volume. If it works at all, it could bring MIPS to levels of volume [SGI] never dreamed of."

SGI named the console’s core chipset "Reality Immersion Technology", featuring MIPS R4300i CPU and the Reality Coprocessor for graphics, audio, and memory management). NEC, Toshiba, and Sharp would provide manufacturing support. The chipset was a collaborative effort between SGI and its subsidiary, MIPS Technologies. SGI and Nintendo also partnered with Rambus, designing a bus architecture to transfer data at 500 Mb/s using its proprietary RDRAM. Rambus hoped the partnership would encourage RDRAM adoption in PCs.

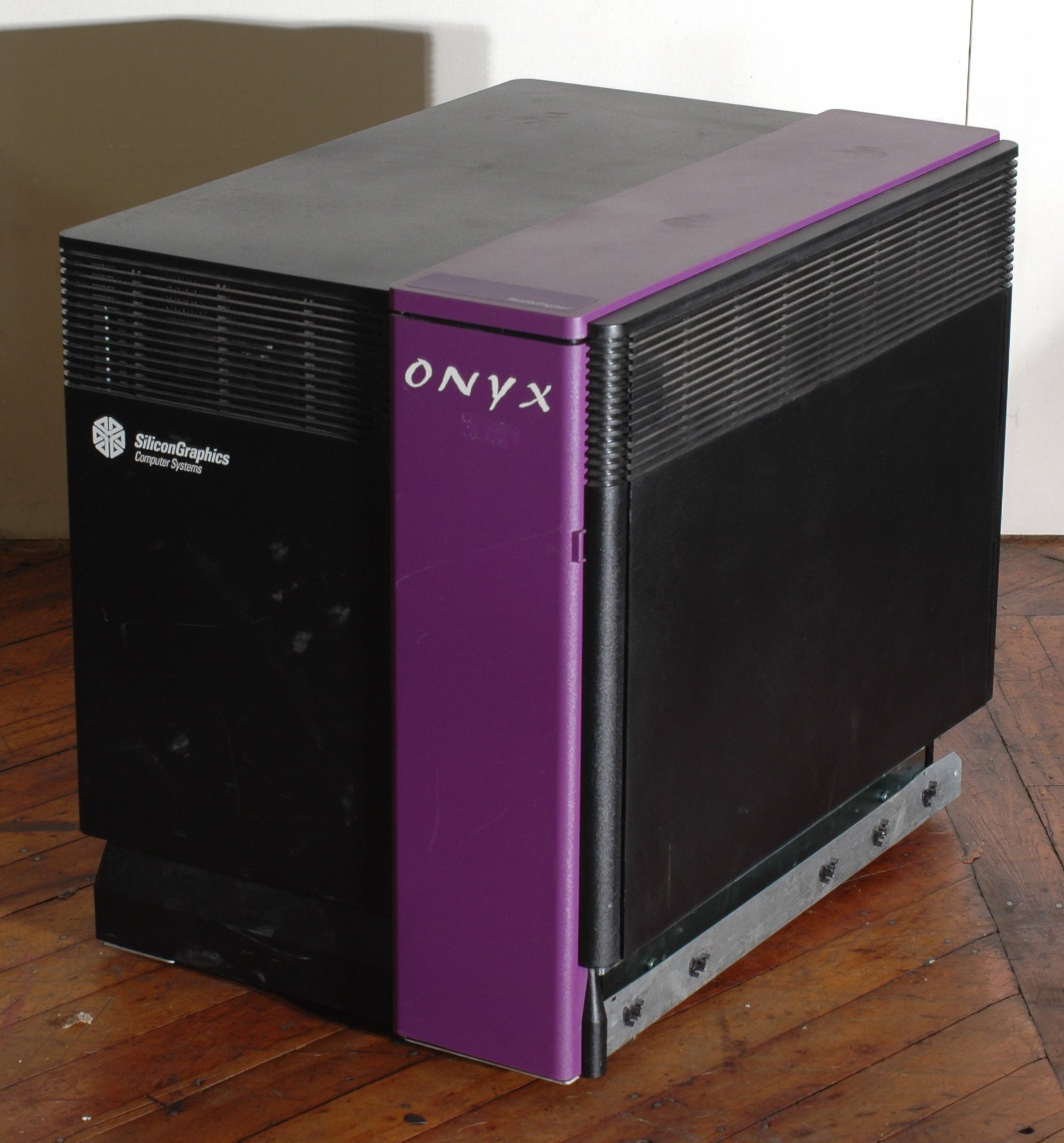
SGI Onyx like those used for early development

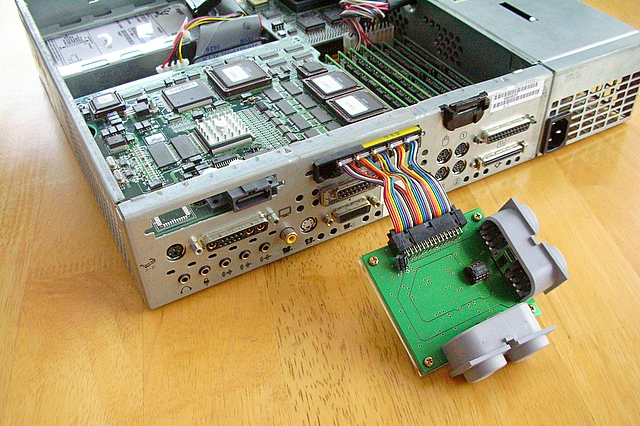
SGI Indy development kit with Nintendo 64 simulation board and controller connectors on breakout board

To enable game creation before the hardware was finalized, SGI offered a development platform based on the Onyx supercomputer to simulate expected console performance. The Onyx was priced at up to $250,000 (equivalent to $540,000 in 2025). It included a $50,000 (equivalent to $110,000 in 2025) RealityEngine2 graphics board and four 150 MHz R4400 CPUs. Once the chipset was finalized, the supercomputing setup was replaced by a simulation board integrated into low-end SGI Indy workstation in July 1995. SGI's early performance estimates proved largely accurate; LucasArts, for instance, ported a prototype Star Wars game to the final hardware in just three days.

On June 23, 1994, at the Consumer Electronics Show, Nintendo announced that the upcoming console would be named the "Ultra 64". The console design was shown, but its controller remained under wraps. The most controversial detail was Nintendo’s decision to use limited-capacity ROM cartridges rather than the increasingly popular CD-ROM format, despite previous development work for a CD-based SNES. Nintendo defended the decision, citing the performance advantages of cartridges. The Ultra 64 was marketed as the world’s first 64-bit console. Though Atari had previously advertised the Jaguar as a 64-bit system, its architecture used two 32-bit coprocessors and a 16/32-bit Motorola 68000 CPU, falling short of Nintendo’s full 64-bit implementation.

Later in 1994, Nintendo signed a licensing agreement with arcade giant Williams. The company's Midway studio would develop Ultra 64-branded arcade titles, including Killer Instinct and Cruis’n USA. However, these arcade machines used hardware distinct from the home console: they lacked the Reality Coprocessor, used different MIPS CPUs, and relied on hard drives instead of cartridges to store game data. The expanded storage enabled games like Killer Instinct to incorporate pre-rendered 3D character sprites and full-motion video backgrounds.

In April 1995, Nintendo introduced its "Dream Team" of developers. Graphic development tools were provided by Alias Research and MultiGen, while Software Creations provided audio tools, which was included on Nintendo's software development kit and became the regular sound driver. Game development studios included Acclaim, Angel Studios, DMA Design, GameTek, Midway, Paradigm, Rare, Sierra On-Line, and Spectrum HoloByte. Despite the initial hype, the Dream Team did not live up to expectations. Some studios like GameTek failed to deliver games, while only a few, including Rare, Acclaim, and Midway, made a significant impact.

Nintendo originally planned to launch the console as the "Ultra Famicom" in Japan and "Nintendo Ultra 64" internationally. While rumors claimed trademark conflicts with Konami's Ultra Games prompted a name change, Nintendo denied this, citing a desire for a unified global brand. The final name "Nintendo 64" was proposed by EarthBound creator Shigesato Itoi. Still, the original name lived on in the console's model numbering prefix "NUS-", widely believed to stand for "Nintendo Ultra Sixty-four."

=== Announcement ===
The newly renamed Nintendo 64 console was unveiled to the public in playable form on November 24 at Nintendo's Shoshinkai 1995 trade show. Eager for a preview, "hordes of Japanese schoolkids huddled in the cold outside ... the electricity of anticipation clearly rippling through their ranks". Game Zero magazine disseminated photos of the event two days later. Official coverage by Nintendo followed later via the Nintendo Power website and print magazine.

The console was originally slated for release by Christmas of 1995. In May 1995, Nintendo delayed the release to April 21, 1996. Consumers anticipating a Nintendo release the following year at a lower price than the competition reportedly reduced the sales of competing Sega and Sony consoles during the important Christmas shopping season. Electronic Gaming Monthly editor Ed Semrad even suggested that Nintendo may have announced the April 21, 1996, release date with this end in mind, knowing in advance that the system would not be ready by that date.

In its explanation of the delay, Nintendo claimed it needed more time for Nintendo 64 software to mature, and for third-party developers to produce games. Adrian Sfarti, a former engineer for SGI, attributed the delay to hardware problems; he claimed that the chips underperformed in testing and were being redesigned. In 1996, the Nintendo 64's software development kit was completely redesigned as the Windows-based Partner-N64 system, by Kyoto Microcomputer, Co. Ltd. of Japan.

The Nintendo 64's release date was later delayed again, to June 23, 1996. Nintendo said the reason for this delay, and in particular, the cancellation of plans to release the console in all markets worldwide simultaneously, was that the company's marketing studies now indicated that they would not be able to manufacture enough units to meet demand by April 21, 1996, potentially angering retailers in the same way Sega had done with its surprise early launch of the Saturn in North America and Europe.

To counteract the possibility that gamers would grow impatient with the wait for the Nintendo 64 and purchase one of the several competing consoles already on the market, Nintendo ran ads for the system well in advance of its announced release dates, with slogans like "Wait for it..." and "Is it worth the wait? Only if you want the best!"

=== Release ===
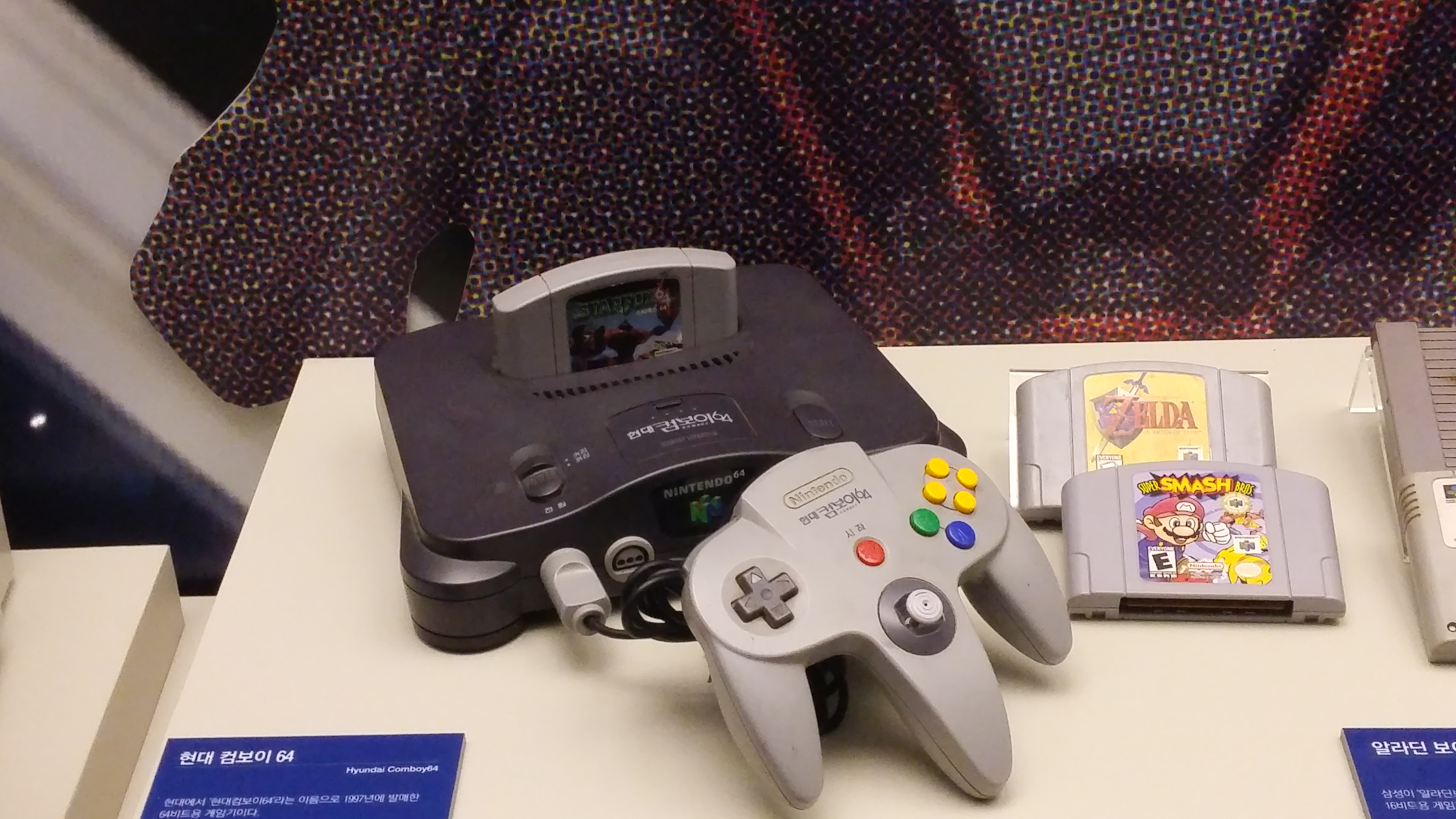
The South Korean Comboy 64

Popular Electronics called the launch a "much hyped, long-anticipated moment". Several months before the launch, GamePro reported that many gamers, including a large percentage of their own editorial staff, were already saying they favored the Nintendo 64 over the Saturn and PlayStation.

The console was first released in Japan on June 23, 1996. Though the initial shipment of 300,000 units sold out on the first day, Nintendo successfully avoided a repeat of the Super Famicom launch day pandemonium, in part by using a wider retail network which included convenience stores. The remaining 200,000 units of the first production run shipped on June 26 and 30, with almost all of them reserved ahead of time. In the months between the Japanese and North American launches, the Nintendo 64 saw brisk sales on the American gray market, with import stores charging as much as $699 plus shipping for the system. The Nintendo 64 was first sold in North America on September 26, 1996, though having been advertised for the 29th. It was launched with just two games in the United States, Pilotwings 64 and Super Mario 64; Cruis'n USA was pulled from the line-up less than a month before launch because it did not meet Nintendo's quality standards. In 1994, prior to the launch, Nintendo of America chairman Howard Lincoln emphasized the quality of first-party games, saying "... we're convinced that a few great games at launch are more important than great games mixed in with a lot of dogs". Its American launch was wildly successful, breaking records - its first day sales were significantly higher than PlayStation's and Saturn's respective launches the year before.

The PAL version of the console was released in Europe on March 1, 1997, except for France where it was released on September 1 of the same year. According to Nintendo of America representatives, Nintendo had been planning a simultaneous launch in Japan, North America, and Europe, but market studies indicated that worldwide demand for the system far exceeded the number of units they could have ready by launch, potentially leading to consumer and retailer frustration.

Originally intended to be priced at US$250, the console was ultimately launched at US$199.99 to make it competitive with Sony and Sega offerings, as both the Saturn and PlayStation had been lowered to $199.99 earlier that summer. Nintendo priced the console as an impulse purchase, a strategy from the toy industry. The price of the console in the United States was further reduced in August 1998.

==== Promotion ====
The Nintendo 64's North American launch was backed with a $54 million marketing campaign by Leo Burnett Worldwide (over $100 in marketing per North American unit that had been manufactured up to this point). While the competing Saturn and PlayStation both set teenagers and adults as their target audience, the Nintendo 64's target audience was pre-teens.

To boost sales during the slow post-Christmas season, Nintendo and General Mills worked together on a promotional campaign that appeared in early 1999. The advertisement by Saatchi & Saatchi, New York began on January 25 and encouraged children to buy Fruit by the Foot snacks for tips to help them with their Nintendo 64 games. Ninety different tips were available, with three variations of thirty tips each.

Nintendo advertised its Funtastic Series of peripherals with a $10 million print and television campaign from February 28 to April 30, 2000. Leo Burnett Worldwide was in charge again.

== Hardware ==
=== Technical specifications ===
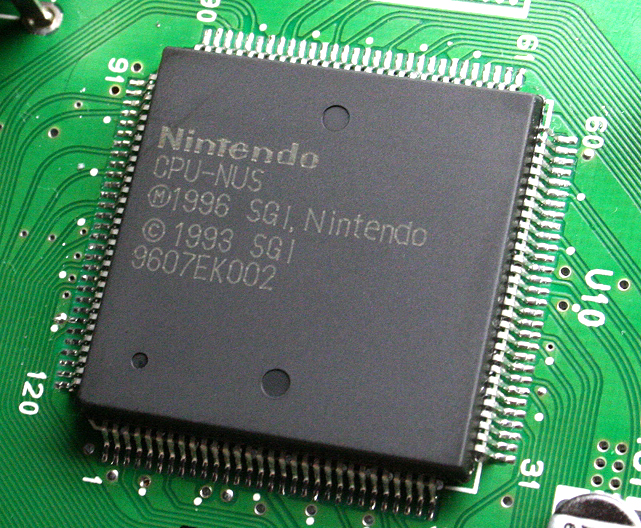
VR4300 CPU

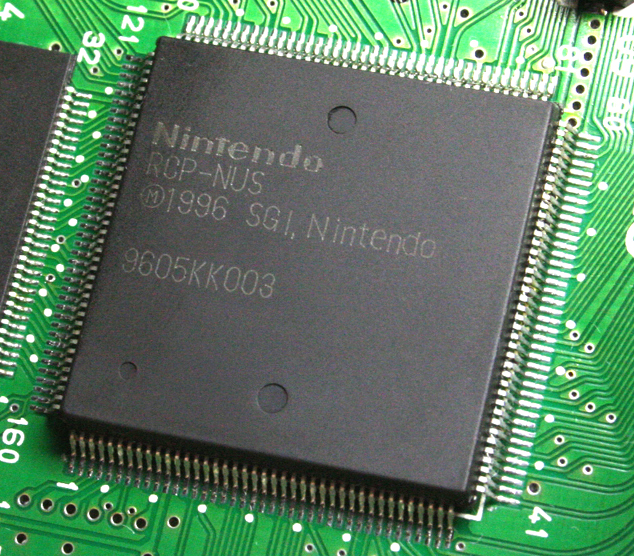
64-bit "Reality Coprocessor"

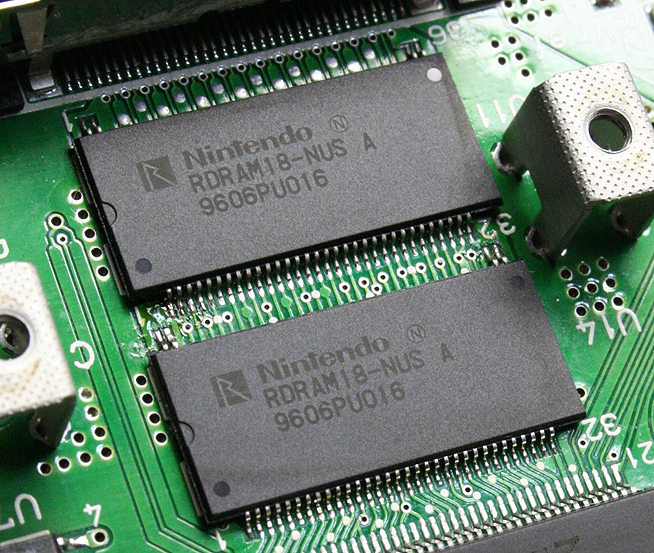
2-chip RDRAM

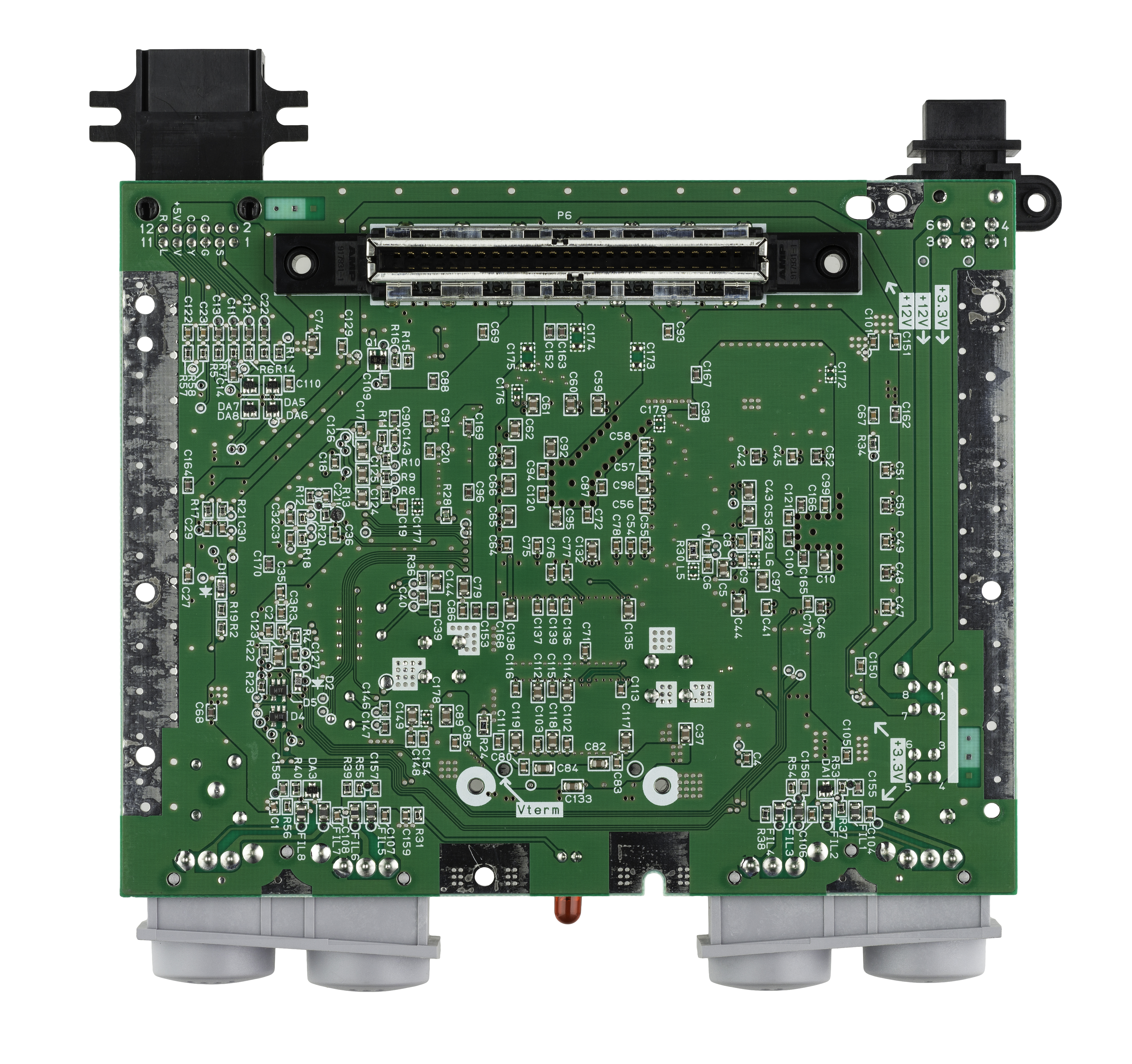
Main motherboard

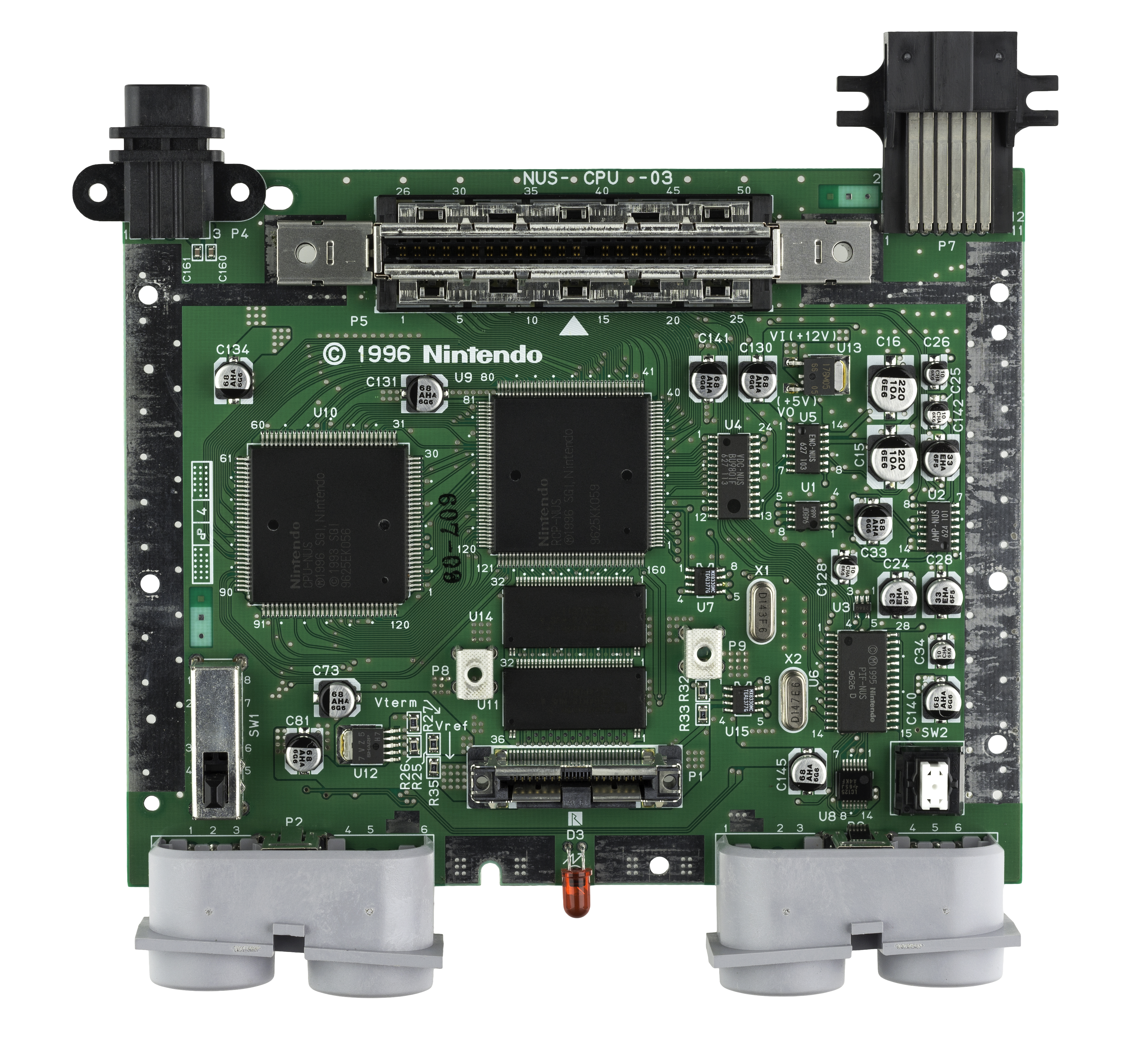
Main motherboard

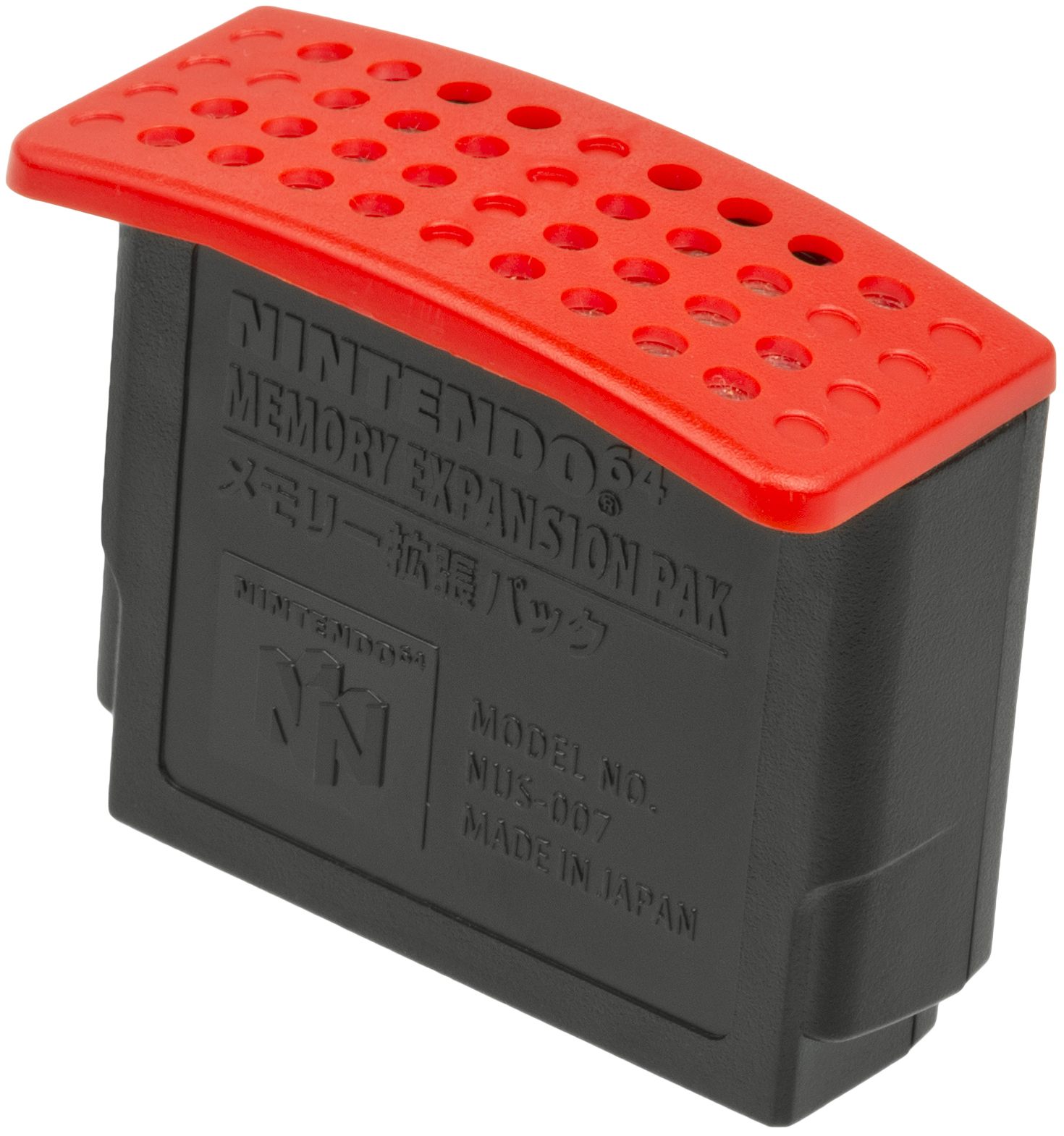
Memory Expansion Pak

The Nintendo 64's architecture is built around the Reality Coprocessor (RCP), which serves as the system’s central hub for processing graphics, audio, and memory management. It works in tandem with the VR4300, a 93.75 MHz 64-bit CPU fabricated by NEC with a performance of 125 million instructions per second. Popular Electronics compared its processing power to that of contemporary Pentium desktop processors. Though constrained by a narrower 32-bit system bus, the VR4300 retained the computational capabilities of the more powerful 64-bit MIPS R4300i on which it was based. However, software rarely utilized 64-bit precision, as Nintendo 64 games primarily relied on faster and more compact 32-bit operations.

The RCP operates at 62.5 MHz and contains two critical components: the "Signal Processor", responsible for sound and graphics processing, and the "Display Processor", which manages pixel drawing. The RCP renders visual data into the graphics frame buffer and controls direct memory access (DMA), transferring video and audio data from memory to a digital-to-analog converter (DAC) for final output.

A key advantage of the Nintendo 64's architecture is that the CPU and RCP operate in parallel, dividing tasks for better efficiency. While the VR4300 executes the main game logic, the RCP processes graphics and sound independently. This design enables 3D rendering and complex audio effects but also requires careful coordination to avoid performance bottlenecks.

The Nintendo 64 was among the first consoles to implement a unified memory architecture, eliminating separate banks of random-access memory (RAM) for CPU, audio, and video operations. It features 4 MB of RDRAM (Rambus DRAM), expandable to 8 MB with the Expansion Pak. At the time, RDRAM was a relatively new technology that provided high bandwidth at a lower cost.

Audio processing is handled by both the CPU and the RCP and is outputted through a DAC with a sample rate of up to 44.1 kHz with 16-bit depth, matching CD quality. However, this level of fidelity was rarely used due to the high CPU demand and the storage limitations of the ROM cartridges. Most games featured stereo sound, with some supporting Dolby Pro Logic surround sound.

For video output, the system supports composite and S-Video output, using the same cables as the Super NES and GameCube. It can display up to 16.8 million colors and resolutions ranging from 256×224 to 640×480 pixels. While most games run at 320×240, some support higher resolutions, often requiring the Expansion Pak. The console also accommodates widescreen formats, with games offering either anamorphic 16:9 or letterboxed display modes.

=== Controller ===
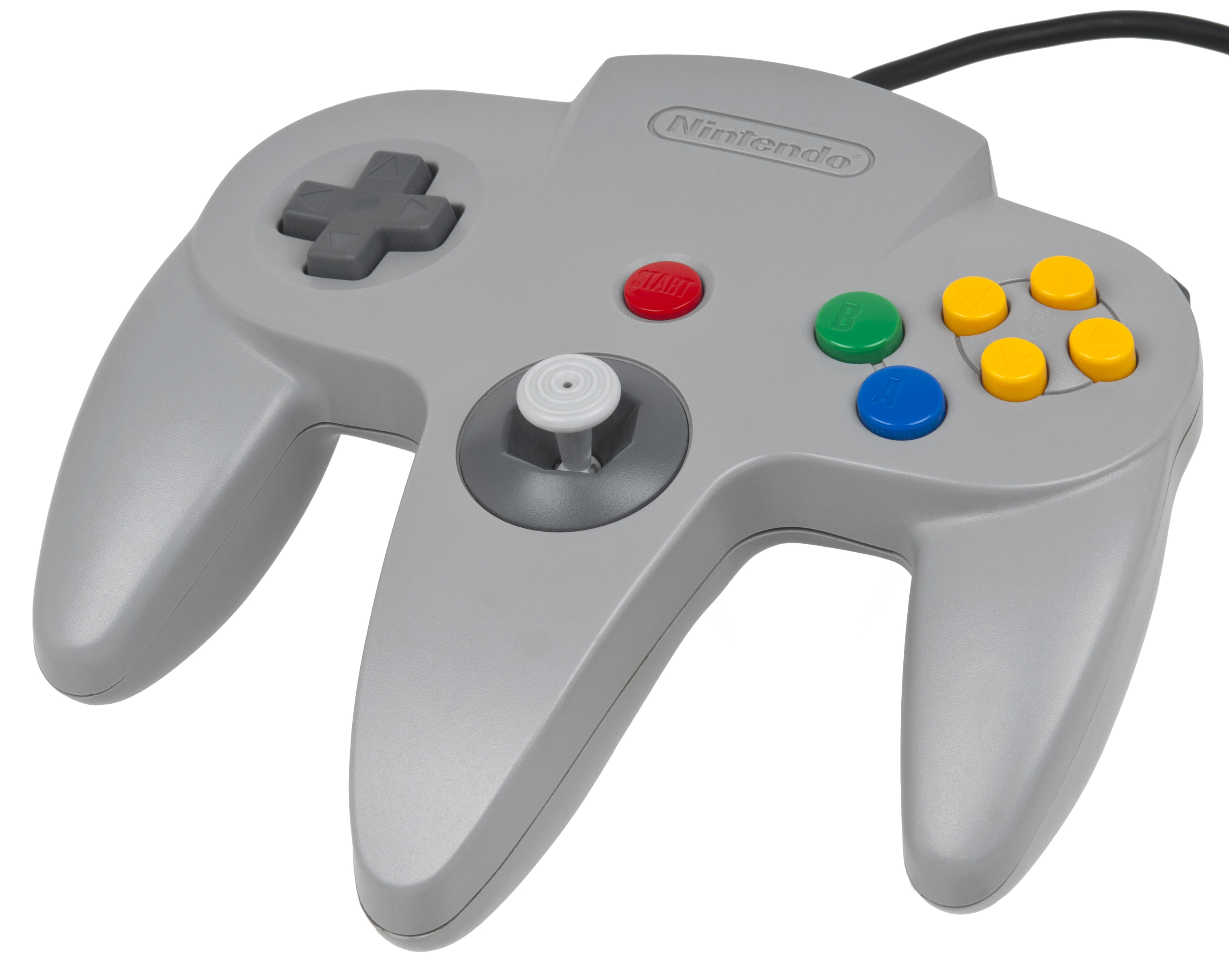
A gray Nintendo 64 controller

The Nintendo 64 controller features a distinctive "M"-shaped design, with a "control stick", making Nintendo the first manufacturer to include a thumbstick as a standard feature in its primary controller. While functionally similar to an analog stick, the control stick is digital, operating on the same principles as a ball mouse.

The controller includes a D-pad and ten buttons: a large A and B button, a Start button, four C-buttons (Up, Down, Left, and Right), two shoulder buttons (L and R), and a Z trigger positioned on the back. Popular Electronics described its shape as "evocative of some alien spaceship." While noting that the three-handle design could be confusing, the magazine praised its versatility, stating "the separate grips allow different hand positions for various game types".

A port on the bottom of the controller allows users to connect various accessories, including the Controller Pak for saving game data, the Rumble Pak for force feedback, and the Transfer Pak, which enabled data transfer between supported Nintendo 64 and Game Boy games.

The Nintendo 64 was also one of the first consoles to feature four controller ports. According to Shigeru Miyamoto, Nintendo included four ports because it was the first console powerful enough to handle four-player split-screen gameplay without significant slowdown.

=== Game Paks ===
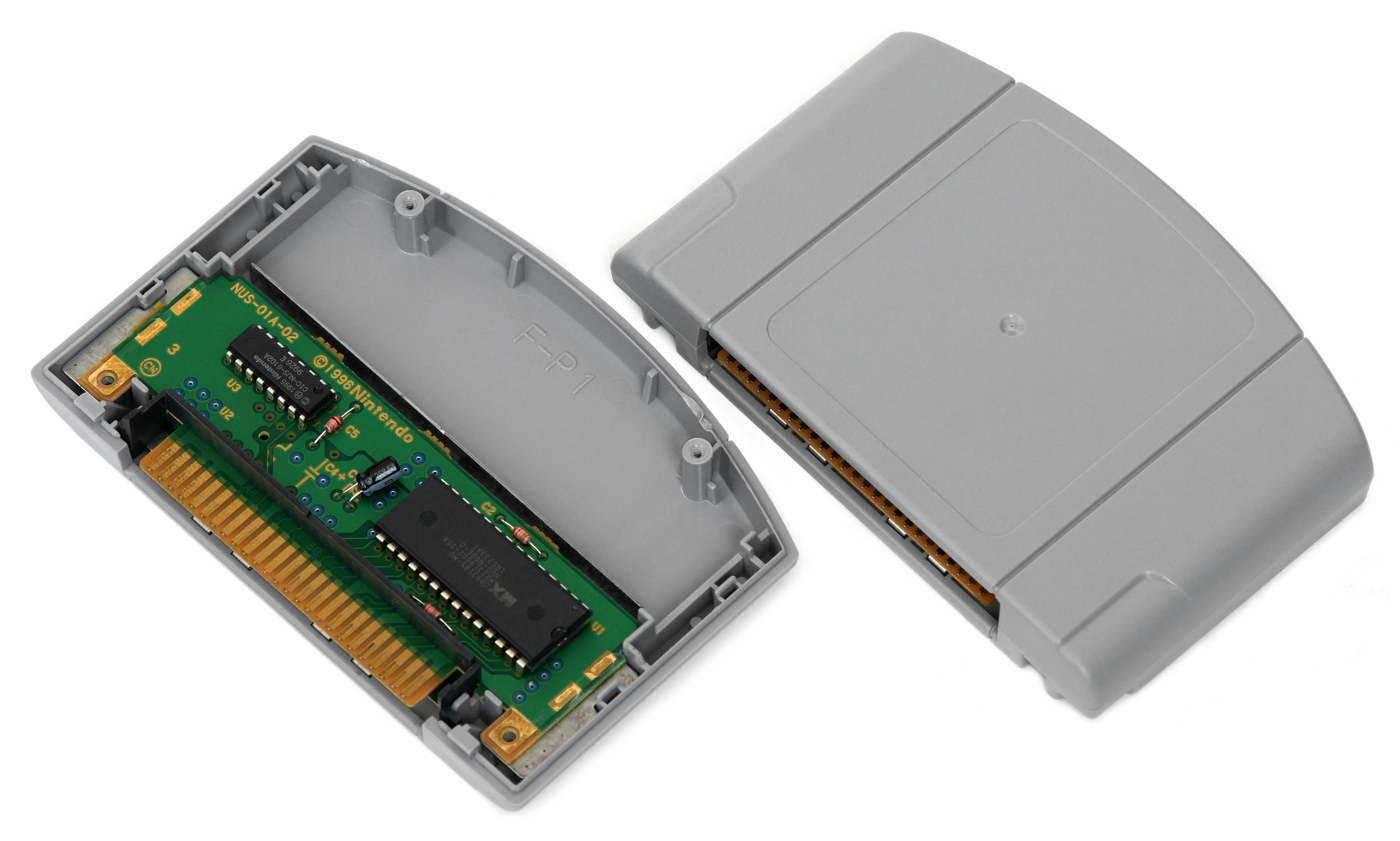
Open and unopened Nintendo 64 Game Paks

After multiple attempts to develop a compact disc-based add-on for the Super NES, many in the industry expected Nintendo’s next console to follow Sony’s PlayStation in adopting the CD format. However, when the first Nintendo 64 prototypes debuted in November 1995, observers were surprised to find that the system once again used ROM cartridges.

Nintendo 64 cartridges range in size from 4 to 64 MB and often include built-in save functionality.

Nintendo’s selection of the cartridge medium was highly controversial and is frequently cited as a key factor in the company losing its dominant position in the gaming market. While cartridges offered advantages such as faster load times and durability, their limitations—higher production costs, lower storage capacity, and longer manufacturing lead times—posed challenges for developers. Many of the format’s benefits required innovative solutions, which only emerged later in the console’s lifecycle.

==== Advantages ====
The big strength was the N64 cartridge. We use the cartridge almost like normal RAM and are streaming all level data, textures, animations, music, sound and even program code while the game is running. With the final size of the levels and the amount of textures, the RAM of the N64 never would have been even remotely enough to fit any individual level. So the cartridge technology really saved the day.

— Factor 5, Bringing Indy to N64 at IGN

Nintendo cited several reasons for choosing cartridges. The biggest advantage was their fast load times—unlike CDs, which required lengthy loading screens, cartridges provided near-instant gameplay. This advantage had previously helped Nintendo compete against home computers like the Commodore 64 in the 1980s. Although cartridges are susceptible to long-term environmental damage, they are significantly more durable than compact discs.

Another key factor was copyright protection—cartridges were harder to pirate than CDs, reducing widespread software piracy. While unauthorized N64-to-PC devices eventually emerged, they were far less common than the more easily copied PlayStation CDs.

==== Disadvantages ====
Cartridges also had notable drawbacks. They took longer to manufacture than CDs, requiring at least two weeks per production run. This forced publishers to predict demand ahead of time, risking either overproduction of costly cartridges or weeks-long shortages if demand was underestimated. Additionally, cartridges were significantly more expensive to produce than CDs, leading to higher game prices, typically US$10 (equivalent to $21 in 2025) more than PlayStation titles.

Third-party developers also complained that they were at an unfair disadvantage. Since Nintendo controlled cartridge manufacturing, it could sell its own first-party games at a lower price, and prioritize their production over those of other companies.

Storage limitations were another key issue. While Nintendo 64 cartridges maxed out at 64 MB, CDs could hold 650 MB. As games became more complex, this restriction forced compromises, including compressed textures, shorter music tracks, and fewer cutscenes. Full-motion video was rarely feasible, and many multiplatform games had to be scaled down for the N64.

These cost and storage constraints pushed many third-party developers toward the PlayStation. Square and Enix, which had originally planned to release Final Fantasy VII and Dragon Warrior VII on the Nintendo 64, switched to Sony’s console due to storage constraints. Other developers, like Konami, released far fewer N64 titles than PlayStation games. As a result, new N64 releases were less frequent compared to its competitors.

Despite these challenges, the Nintendo 64 remained competitive, bolstered by strong first-party titles and exclusive hits like GoldenEye 007. Nintendo’s flagship franchises, including Mario and Zelda, retained strong brand appeal, and deals with second-party developers like Rare further strengthened the console’s game library.

=== Programming characteristics ===
Programming for the Nintendo 64 presented unique challenges alongside notable advantages. The Economist described development for the system as "horrendously complex". Like many game consoles and embedded systems, the Nintendo 64 featured highly specialized hardware optimizations, which were further complicated by design oversights, limitations in 3D technology, and manufacturing constraints.

As the console neared the end of its lifecycle, Nintendo’s hardware chief, Genyo Takeda, repeatedly reflected on these difficulties, using the Japanese term hansei (反省), meaning "reflective regret." Looking back, he admitted, "When we made Nintendo 64, we thought it was logical that if you want to make advanced games, it becomes technically more difficult. We were wrong. We now understand it's the cruising speed that matters, not the momentary flash of peak power."

=== Regional lockout ===
Unlike the NES and Super NES, which employed region-specific branding and hardware variations, the Nintendo 64 maintained a consistent design and brand worldwide. While Nintendo initially announced the use of regional lockout chips to restrict game compatibility, the platform ultimately enforced region-locking through physical cartridge design, with each market having cartridges with different notches on the back, preventing a cartridge from one region from being inserted into a foreign console.

=== Color variants ===
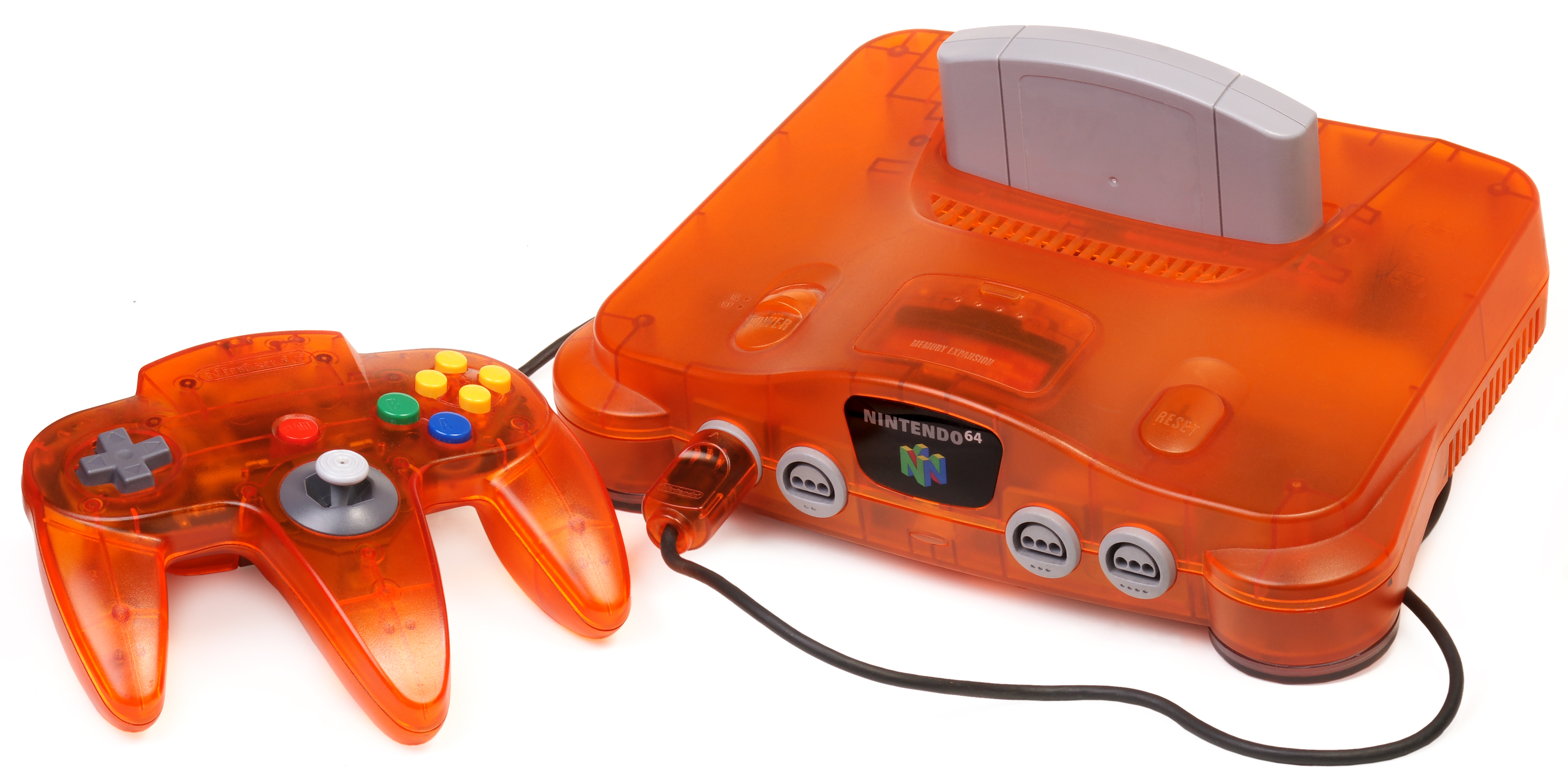
A Nintendo 64 console and controller in Fire-Orange color

The Nintendo 64 comes in several colors. The standard Nintendo 64 is charcoal gray, nearly black, and the controller is solid gray (later releases in the U.S., Canada, and Australia included a bonus second controller in Atomic Purple). The console was released in various colors and special editions.

Most Nintendo 64 game cartridges are gray in color, but some games have a colored cartridge. Fourteen games have black cartridges, and other colors (such as yellow, blue, red, gold, and green) were each used for six or fewer games. Several games, such as The Legend of Zelda: Ocarina of Time, were released both in standard gray and in colored, limited edition versions.

=== Aleck 64 ===
The Aleck 64 is an arcade system board based on the Nintendo 64, designed by SETA Corporation in cooperation with Nintendo, and sold exclusively in Japan from 1998 to 2003. It essentially consists of a Nintendo 64 board retrofitted with sound capabilities that were standard for arcade games of the time. Nintendo and SETA began working on their agreement for the board in 1996, aiming to replicate the business model that Namco and Sony Computer Entertainment had established with the Namco System 11, facilitating conversions of arcade games. Nintendo did not release any arcade game using this hardware.

- Eleven Beat (developed with Hudson Soft)
- Hanabi de Doon! - Don-chan Puzzle (developed with Aruze)
- Hi Pai Paradise (developed with Aruze)
- Hi Pai Paradise 2 - onsen ni ikou yo! (developed with Aruze)
- Kurukuru Fever (developed with Aruze)
- Magical Tetris Challenge: Featuring Mickey (developed with Capcom)
- Mayjinsen 3
- Rev Limit (unreleased)
- Star Soldier: Vanishing Earth (developed with Hudson Soft)
- Super Real Mahjong VS
- Aleck Bordon Adventure 4th Story: Tower & Shaft (developed with Aruze and Altron)
- Vivid Dolls (developed with Visco)
- Variant Schwanzer (developed with Sigma) (unreleased)

== Games ==
A screenshot of Super Mario 64, taken from its ninth level, Dire, Dire Docks

A total of 388 Nintendo 64 games were officially released, 85 of which were exclusively sold in Japan. For comparison, the PlayStation received 4,105 games, the Saturn got over 1,000, the SNES got 1,755 games, and the NES got 716 Western releases plus over 1,000 in Japan. The considerably smaller Nintendo 64 game library has been attributed by some to the controversial decision not to adopt the CD-ROM, and programming difficulties for its complex architecture. This trend is also seen as a result of Hiroshi Yamauchi's strategy, announced during his speech at the Nintendo 64's November 1995 unveiling, that Nintendo would be restricting the number of games produced for the Nintendo 64 so that developers would focus on higher quality instead of quantity. The Los Angeles Times also observed that this was part of Nintendo's "penchant for perfection [...] while other platforms offer quite a bit of junk, Nintendo routinely orders game developers back to the boards to fix less-than-perfect titles".

Although having much less third-party support than rival consoles, Nintendo's strong first-party franchises such as Mario enjoyed wide brand appeal. Second-parties of Nintendo, such as Rare, released groundbreaking titles. Consequently, the Nintendo 64 game library included a high number of critically acclaimed and widely sold games. According to TRSTS reports, three of the top five best-selling games in the U.S. for December 1996 were Nintendo 64 games (both of the remaining two were Super NES games). Super Mario 64 is the best-selling console game of the generation, with 11 million units sold beating Gran Turismo for the PlayStation (at 10.85 million) and Final Fantasy VII (at 9.72 million) in sales. The game also received much praise from critics and helped to pioneer three-dimensional control schemes. GoldenEye 007 was important in the evolution of the first-person shooter, and has been named one of the greatest in the genre. The Legend of Zelda: Ocarina of Time set the standard for future 3D action-adventure games and is considered by many to be one of the greatest games ever made.

=== Graphics ===
The most graphically demanding Nintendo 64 games on larger 32 or 64 MB cartridges are among the most advanced and detailed of 32- and 64-bit platforms. To maximize the hardware, developers created custom microcode. Nintendo 64 games running on custom microcode benefit from much higher polygon counts and more advanced lighting, animation, physics, and AI routines than its competition. Conker's Bad Fur Day is arguably the pinnacle of its generation combining multicolored real-time lighting that illuminates each area to real-time shadowing, and detailed texturing replete with a full in-game facial animation system. The Nintendo 64 is capable of executing many more advanced and complex rendering techniques than its competitors. It is the first home console to feature trilinear filtering to smooth textures. This contrasts with the Saturn and PlayStation, which use nearest-neighbor interpolation and produce more pixelated textures. Overall however the results of the Nintendo cartridge system were mixed.

The smaller storage size of ROM cartridges can limit the number of available textures. As a result, many games with much smaller 8 or 12 MB cartridges are forced to stretch textures over larger surfaces. Compounded by a limit of 4,096 bytes of on-chip texture memory, the result is often a distorted, out-of-proportion appearance. Many games with larger 32 or 64 MB cartridges avoid this issue entirely, including Resident Evil 2, Sin and Punishment: Successor of the Earth, and Conker's Bad Fur Day, allowing for more detailed graphics with multiple, multi-layered textures across all surfaces.

=== Emulation ===
Several Nintendo 64 games have been released for the Wii and Wii U Virtual Console (VC) services and are playable with the Classic Controller, GameCube controller, Wii U Pro Controller, or Wii U GamePad. Differences include a higher resolution and a more consistent framerate than the Nintendo 64 originals. Some features, such as Rumble Pak functionality, are not available in the Wii versions. Some features are also changed on the Virtual Console releases. For example, the VC version of Pokémon Snap allows players to send photos through the Wii's message service, and Wave Race 64's in-game content was altered due to the expiration of the Kawasaki license. Several games developed by Rare were released on Microsoft's Xbox Live Arcade service, including Banjo-Kazooie, Banjo-Tooie, and Perfect Dark, following Microsoft's acquisition of Rareware in 2002. One exception is Donkey Kong 64, released in April 2015 on the Wii U Virtual Console, as Nintendo retained the rights to the game. Select Nintendo 64 games have been re-released via the Nintendo Classics service as part of the "Expansion Pack" tier of the Nintendo Switch Online service. With the launch of the Nintendo Switch 2 on June 5, 2025, the additional features of the Nintendo 64 - Nintendo Classics will offer CRT filter, rewind function and button remapping (one of these features is also available on the Nintendo Switch).

Several unofficial third-party emulators can play Nintendo 64 games on other platforms, such as Windows, Macintosh, and smartphones.

== Accessories ==
=== 64DD ===
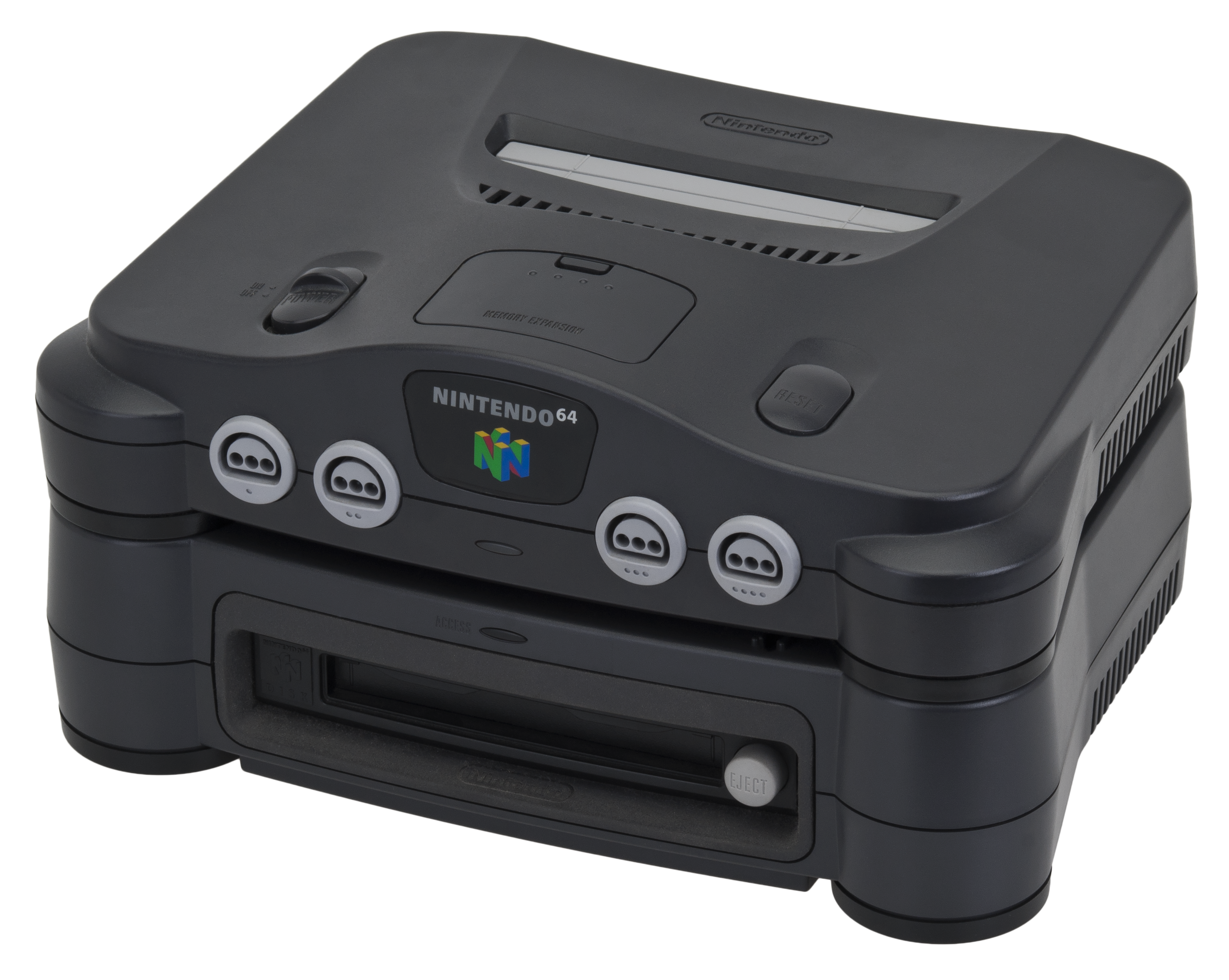
A Nintendo 64 with the 64DD installed below

Nintendo released a peripheral platform called 64DD, where "DD" stands for "Disk Drive". Connecting to the expansion slot at the bottom of the system, the 64DD turns the Nintendo 64 console into an Internet appliance, a multimedia workstation, and an expanded gaming platform. This large peripheral allows players to play Nintendo 64 disk-based games, capture images from an external video source, and it allowed players to connect to the now-defunct Japanese Randnet online service. Not long after its limited mail-order release, the peripheral was discontinued. Only nine games were released, including the four Mario Artist games (Paint Studio, Talent Studio, Communication Kit, and Polygon Studio). Many planned games were eventually released in cartridge format or on other game consoles. The 64DD and the accompanying Randnet online service were released only in Japan.

To illustrate the fundamental significance of the 64DD to all game development at Nintendo, lead designer Shigesato Itoi said: "I came up with a lot of ideas because of the 64DD. All things start with the 64DD. There are so many ideas I wouldn't have been allowed to come up with if we didn't have the 64DD". Shigeru Miyamoto concluded: "Almost every new project for the N64 is based on the 64DD. ... we'll make the game on a cartridge first, then add the technology we've cultivated to finish it up as a full-out 64DD game".

== iQue Player ==
The iQue Player was a handheld TV game Nintendo 64 system that released only in China on November 17, 2003, after China banned video game consoles. The games that were released in the iQue Player's lifetime (from 2003 to 2016) are Super Mario 64, The Legend of Zelda: Ocarina of Time, Mario Kart 64, Wave Race 64, Star Fox 64, Yoshi's Story, Paper Mario, Super Smash Bros., F-Zero X, Dr. Mario 64, Excitebike 64, Sin and Punishment, Custom Robo and Animal Crossing.

== Reception ==
=== Critical reception ===
The Nintendo 64 received acclaim from critics. Reviewers praised the console's advanced 3D graphics and gameplay, while criticizing the lack of games. On G4techTV's Filter, the Nintendo 64 was voted up to No. 1 by registered users.

In February 1996, Next Generation magazine called the Nintendo Ultra 64 the "best kept secret in videogames" and the "world's most powerful game machine". It called the system's November 24, 1995, unveiling at Shoshinkai "the most anticipated videogaming event of the 1990s, possibly of all time". Previewing the Nintendo 64 shortly prior to its launch, Time magazine praised the realistic movement and gameplay provided by the combination of fast graphics processing, pressure-sensitive controller, and the Super Mario 64 game. The review praised the "fastest, smoothest game action yet attainable via joystick at the service of equally virtuoso motion", where "[f]or once, the movement on the screen feels real". Asked if consumers should buy a Nintendo 64 at launch, buy it later, or buy a competing system, a panel of six GamePro editors voted almost unanimously to buy at launch; one editor said consumers who already own a PlayStation and are on a limited budget should buy it later, and all others should buy it at launch.

At launch, the Los Angeles Times called the system "quite simply, the fastest, most graceful game machine on the market". Its form factor was described as small, light, and "built for heavy play by kids" unlike the "relatively fragile Sega Saturn". Showing concern for a major console product launch during a sharp, several-year long, decline in the game console market, the review said that the long-delayed Nintendo 64 was "worth the wait" in the company's pursuit of quality. Although the Times expressed concerns about having only two launch games at retail and twelve expected by Christmas, this was suggested to be part of Nintendo's "penchant for perfection", as "while other platforms offer quite a bit of junk, Nintendo routinely orders game developers back to the boards to fix less-than-perfect titles". Describing the quality control incentives associated with cartridge-based development, the Times cited Nintendo's position that cartridge game developers tend to "place a premium on substance over flash", and noted that the launch games lack the "poorly acted live-action sequences or half-baked musical overtures" which it says tend to be found on CD-ROM games. Praising Nintendo's controversial choice of the cartridge medium with its "nonexistent" load times and "continuous, fast-paced action CD-ROMs simply cannot deliver", the review concluded that "the cartridge-based Nintendo 64 delivers blistering speed and tack-sharp graphics that are unheard of on personal computers and make competing 32-bit, disc-based consoles from Sega and Sony seem downright sluggish".

Time named it the 1996 Machine of the Year, saying the machine had "done to video-gaming what the 707 did to air travel". The magazine said the console achieved "the most realistic and compelling three-dimensional experience ever presented by a computer". Time credited the Nintendo 64 with revitalizing the video game market, "rescuing this industry from the dustbin of entertainment history". The magazine suggested that the Nintendo 64 would play a major role in introducing children to digital technology in the final years of the 20th century. The article concluded by saying the console had already provided "the first glimpse of a future where immensely powerful computing will be as common and easy to use as our televisions". The console also won the 1996 Spotlight Award for Best New Technology.

Popular Electronics complimented the system's hardware, calling its specifications "quite impressive". It found the controller "comfortable to hold, and the controls to be accurate and responsive".

In a 1997 year-end review, a team of five Electronic Gaming Monthly editors gave the Nintendo 64 scores of 8.0, 7.0, 7.5, 7.5, and 9.0. They highly praised the power of the hardware and the quality of the first-party games, especially those developed by Rare's and Nintendo's internal studios, but also commented that the third-party output to date had been mediocre and the first-party output was not enough by itself to provide Nintendo 64 owners with a steady stream of good games or a full breadth of genres. Next Generation's end of 1997 review expressed similar concern about third party support, while also noting signs that the third party output was improving, and speculated that the Nintendo 64's arrival late in its generation could lead to an early obsolescence when Sony and Sega's successor consoles launched. However, they said that for some, Nintendo's reliably high-quality software would outweigh those drawbacks, and gave the system 3 1/2 out of 5 stars.

Developer Factor 5, which created some of the system's most technologically advanced games along with the system's audio development tools for Nintendo, said, "[T]he N64 is really sexy because it combines the performance of an SGI machine with a cartridge. We're big arcade fans, and cartridges are still the best for arcade games or perhaps a really fast CD-ROM. But there's no such thing for consoles yet [as of 1998]".

=== Sales ===
The Nintendo 64 was highly successful in the North America region; conversely, sales proved to be underwhelming in the domestic Japanese and in European markets. Nintendo reported that the system's vintage hardware and software sales had ceased by 2004, three years after the GameCube's launch; as of December 31, 2009, the Nintendo 64 had yielded a lifetime total of 5.54 million system units sold in Japan, 20.63 million in the Americas, and 6.75 million in other regions, for a total of 32.93 million units.

==== North America ====
The Nintendo 64 was in heavy demand upon its release. David Cole, industry analyst, said "You have people fighting to get it from stores". Time called the purchasing interest "that rare and glorious middle-class Cabbage Patch-doll frenzy". The magazine said celebrities Matthew Perry, Steven Spielberg, and Chicago Bulls players called Nintendo to ask for special treatment to get their hands on the console. In North America and Europe, the console had only two launch games, with Super Mario 64 as its killer app.

During the system's first three days on the market, retailers sold 350,000 of 500,000 available console units. During its first four months, the console yielded 500,000 unit sales in North America. Nintendo successfully outsold Sony and Sega early in 1997 in the United States; by the end of its first full year, the console had sold 3.6 million units in the United States. BusinessWire reported that the Nintendo 64 was responsible for Nintendo's sales having increased by 156% by 1997. Five different Nintendo 64 games exceeded 1 million in sales during 1997.

After a strong launch year, the decision to use the cartridge format is said to have contributed to the diminished release pace and higher price of games compared to the competition, and thus Nintendo was unable to maintain its lead in the United States. The console would continue to outsell the Sega Saturn throughout the generation, but would trail behind the PlayStation.

Nintendo's efforts to attain dominance in the key 1997 holiday shopping season were also hurt by game delays. Five high-profile Nintendo games slated for release by Christmas 1997 (The Legend of Zelda: Ocarina of Time, Banjo-Kazooie, Conker's Quest, Yoshi's Story, and Major League Baseball Featuring Ken Griffey Jr.) were delayed until 1998, and Diddy Kong Racing was announced at the last minute in an effort to somewhat fill the gaps. In an effort to take the edge off of the console's software pricing disadvantage, Nintendo worked to lower manufacturing costs for Nintendo 64 cartridges, and leading into the 1997 holiday shopping season announced a new pricing structure which amounted to a roughly 15% price cut on both first-party and third-party games. Response from third-party publishers was positive, with key third-party publisher Capcom saying the move led them to reconsider their decision not to publish games for the console.

==== Japan ====
In Japan, the console was not as successful, failing to outsell the PlayStation and the Sega Saturn. Benimaru Itō, a developer for Mother 3 and friend of Shigeru Miyamoto, speculated in 1997 that the Nintendo 64's lower popularity in Japan was due to the lack of role-playing video games. Nintendo CEO Hiroshi Yamauchi also said the console's lower popularity in Japan was most likely due to lack of role-playing games, and the small number of games being released in general. The higher price of cartridges as opposed to CD-ROM has also been cited as a reason for the system's lackluster third-party support, which led to domestically big titles, such as Dragon Quest VII, moving away from Nintendo's platforms to its rivals.

Shigeru Miyamoto commented at the time that the Nintendo 64's situation in Japan was grim and that it was also tough in Europe, but that these were overcome by its success in America and therefore "the business has become completely viable".

=== Legacy ===
The Nintendo 64 is one of the most well-known game systems in history, Designed in tandem with the controller, Super Mario 64 and The Legend of Zelda: Ocarina of Time are widely considered by critics and the public to be two of the most influential games of all time. GoldenEye 007 is also often considered to be one of the most influential games for the shooter genre.

The Aleck 64 is a Nintendo 64 design in arcade form, designed by Seta in cooperation with Nintendo, and sold from 1998 to 2003 only in Japan.

In 2011, IGN ranked it as the ninth-greatest video game console of all time.

The Nintendo 64 has been especially popular for homebrew and ROM hacking (the latter of which is especially popular for Super Mario 64). These efforts have gained recognition for significant technical improvements over the consoles retail games.
