= Guardian (1986 video game) =

1986 video game

- Developer: Toaplan
- Publishers: JP: Taito; NA: Kitkorp
- Artist: Kōetsu Iwabuchi
- Composers: Masahiro Yuge; Tatsuya Uemura
- Platform: Arcade
- Release: JP: March 1986; NA: May 1986
- Genre: Beat 'em up
- Modes: Single-player, multiplayer

Guardian (Note: Also known as Get Star (Japanese: ゲットスター, Hepburn: Getto Sutā) in Japan) is a 1986 side-scrolling beat 'em up arcade video game developed by Toaplan and published in Japan by Taito and North America by Kitkorp. In the game, players assume the role of a robot fighting against a multitude of enemies and bosses across six locations on a futuristic science fiction setting. It is notable for marking the debut of Twin Cobra and Hellfire artist Kōetsu Iwabuchi in the video game industry, serving as its graphic designer.

Guardian was considered a financial flop in arcades for Toaplan. As of 2019, the rights to the title is owned by Tatsujin, a company founded in 2017 by former Toaplan member Masahiro Yuge and now-affiliate of Japanese arcade manufacturer exA-Arcadia alongside many other IPs from the defunct studio.

== Gameplay ==
Gameplay screenshot

Guardian is a science fiction-themed side-scrolling beat 'em up game reminiscent of Kung-Fu Master, where players assume the role of a robot through six increasingly difficult fictional planets, each with a boss at the end that must be fought before progressing any further as the main objective.

The player controls the robot with a four-way joystick and two attack buttons to punch and kick. The joystick is not only used for crouching, but for jumping as well. Punches and kicks are performed from either a standing, crouching or jumping position. Along the way, there are three types of items that appear as flashing crosses: extra energy stock, invincibility and a long-range laser weapon. On occasions, a red orb spawns on the ground and when picked up, increases the robot's punching power up to three times.

The game hosts hidden bonus secrets to be found, which are crucial for reaching high-scores to obtain extra lives. The title uses a checkpoint system in which a downed single player will start off at the beginning of the checkpoint they managed to reach before dying. Running out of energy will result in losing a live, as well as a penalty of decreasing the robot's power to his original state and once all lives are lost, the game is over unless the players insert more credits into the arcade machine to continue playing. After completing the last stage, the game begins again with the second loop.

== Development and release ==
Guardian's development process and history were recounted between 1990 and 2009 through Japanese publications such as Gamest. Kōetsu Iwabuchi designed the game's graphics in his first video game role prior to Twin Cobra and Hellfire. Former Toaplan composer Tatsuya Uemura stated that the title was developed alongside another project intended for the Sega System 1 that was ultimately scrapped. The music was composed by Masahiro Yuge, although Uemura wrote the boss music.

Guardian was released only in arcades across Japan and North America in March 1986 by Taito and Kitkorp. It was showcased in Japan at the 1986 AOU Show and for the first time in North America during the 1986 ACME show in Chicago before launch. An album containing music from the title, as well as from other Toaplan games was published exclusively in Japan by City Connection under their Clarice Disk label in July 2018. Japanese company M2 published every game by Toaplan (excluding Mahjong Sisters and Enma Daiō) for consoles in Japan including Guardian. In 2021, the game was included in the Kyukyoku Tiger-Heli compilation for Nintendo Switch and PlayStation 4 as part of M2's Toaplan Arcade Garage label. Guardian was included as part of the Toaplan Arcade 1 compilation for Evercade in 2022.

== Reception and legacy ==
Reception

Review score
Publication	Score
Micom BASIC Magazine	3/4

Ichiro Tezuka of Japanese publication Micom BASIC Magazine regarded Guardian as a fun Spartan X-style game due to the enemy variety and attack patterns on each planet. According to Toaplan, however, the title was a commercial failure in arcades. The official world record for the game is held by Will Czeswinski with 1,058,420 points. Despite its failure, the game served as an influence for titles such as Locomalito's Star Guardian. In more recent years, the rights to the title and many other IPs from Toaplan are now owned by Tatsujin, a company named after Truxton's Japanese title that was founded in 2017 by former Toaplan employee Masahiro Yuge, and is part of Embracer Group since 2022.
