= Gekirindan =

1995 video game

- Developer: Taito (Note: Ported to Sega Saturn by Japan Media Programming.)
- Publishers: Taito; Virgin Interactive Entertainment (Saturn)
- Producer: Osamu Ōta
- Designers: Hidetomo Ogino; Tomonobu Kawaga (uncredited)
- Programmer: Takahito Naoi
- Artists: Miyabi Tashiro; Ryota Sasaki; Saori Hiratsuka
- Composers: Kazuko Umino; Koji Sakurai
- Platforms: Arcade, Sega Saturn
- Release: Arcade: WW: September 1995; Sega Saturn: JP: April 18, 1997
- Genre: Vertically scrolling shooter
- Modes: Single-player, multiplayer
- Arcade system: Taito F3 System

Gekirindan (Note: Japanese: 逆鱗弾(ゲキリンダン); lit. "Reverse Scale Bullet") is a 1995 vertically scrolling shooter arcade video game originally developed and published by Taito in Japan, America and Europe. Set in the year 3195, where a robot known as "Huge Boss" stole a newly developed time machine to travel back in time and rewrite human history, players assume the role of one of the six fighter pilots taking control of their own space fighter craft in an effort to overthrow the evil entity from altering history.

Headed by Snow Bros. and Twin Hawk composer Osamu Ōta, Gekirindan was created by some members of Toaplan at Taito after the former company declared bankruptcy in 1994. Initially launched for the arcades, the game later received a conversion for the Sega Saturn by Japan Media Programming and published exclusively in Japan by Virgin Interactive Entertainment on April 18, 1997, featuring multiple changes compared with the original version. The title has since been re-released through compilations such as Taito Legends 2 across various platforms in 2006. The title has been met with mixed critical reception from reviewers.

== Gameplay ==
Arcade version screenshot

Gekirindan is a science fiction-themed vertically scrolling shoot 'em up game reminiscent of Truxton II and DonPachi, where players assume the role of one of the six pilots taking control of their respective space fighter craft (a futuristic fighter jet, a helicopter conditioned for space travel and a remodeled old-fashioned airplane) through five increasingly difficult levels in an effort to effort to defeat Huge Boss and prevent his plan of rewriting human history as the main objective.

As far as vertical scrolling shooters go, the title initially appears to be very standard; Players control their craft over a constantly scrolling background and the scenery never stops moving until a boss is reached. Players also have three weapons at their disposal: the main weapon that travels a max distance of the screen's height, a sub-weapon and three bombs capable of obliterating any enemy caught within its blast radius.

A unique gameplay feature is the main weapon system; Similar to Out Zone, each ship is equipped with two main weapons at the beginning that can be upgraded by picking up "P" icons and switch between them by picking up a "C" icon that alters the player's shot pattern, while sub-weapons appear on certain occasions as colored letter icons (ranging from blue missiles, red napalm bombs and a green homing laser). Various other items can also be picked up along the way such as 1UPs and additional bomb stocks. Similar to DonPachi, players also have the ability to choose between three fighter ship types, each having their own shot pattern: A, B and C.

There are multiple scoring methods for reaching high-scores to obtain extra lives in the game apart from destroying enemies. Points can be gained from collecting eagle-shaped gold medals and once the level is finished, 5000 points are awarded for every one collected. "Bonus" icons also grant extra points by grabbing them. The game employs a respawn system where in which a downed single player will start off immediately at the location they died at. Getting hit by enemy fire will result in losing a live, as well as a penalty of decreasing the ship's firepower to its original state and once all lives are lost, the game is over unless the player inserts more credits into the arcade machine to continue playing. Unlike previous shoot 'em ups titles released at the time, there are no additional loops after completing the last stage.

== Synopsis ==
=== Plot ===
The plot summary of Gekirindan is explained through supplementary materials. In the year 3195, a time machine is created on Earth and is promptly stolen by an unidentified mechanized being known as "Huge Boss". This evil entity uses the device to travel back in time and rewrite 3000 years of human history. The only resistance Huge Boss faces is a group of six fighter pilots from multiple eras who aim to stop him, although some of them have their own motivations other than saving mankind.

=== Characters ===
- Hokuto Higara: Pilot of the Type A (P1) ship. An attractive male pilot from the 32nd century who seeks to avenge the death of his family with the destruction of Huge Boss.
- Anne Kutos: Pilot of the Type B (P1) ship. A young woman from the 20th century, who writes all her experiences as she goes through life, looking to save her family from the grasp of Huge Boss. Her character is reminiscent of Anne Shirley, a popular literary character in Japan.
- Dietza Savis: Pilot of the Type C (P1) ship. An Elvis Presley look-alike from the 1950s seeking battle against Huge Boss to boost his rock and roll career.
- Grother Fedel: Pilot of the Type A (P2) ship. A confident pilot from an unknown time period who faces Huge Boss for personal reasons, keeping a picture of a beautiful dark-haired woman alongside him.
- Shario Vissen: Pilot of the Type B (P2) ship. An attractive young adult girl from the 32nd century attempting to fulfill the last wishes of her recently deceased sister by destroying Huge Boss, travelling with her cat-like pet.
- Orsa and Mayoru: Pilot of the Type C (P2) ship. Two young elf pilots and nature lovers, possibly from the 32nd century, who vowed to overthrow Huge Boss after his attack against humans obliterated Earth's nature and nearly extinguished all animal life.

== Development and release ==
Gekirindan was created by ex-Toaplan members at Taito after the former company declared bankruptcy in 1994. Snow Bros. and Twin Hawk composer Osamu Ōta acted as producer under the alias "Lee", while Hidetomo Ogino was the project's sole designer. Masaki Yagi and Takahito Naoi served as one of the game's programmers and system engineers respectively. Artists Miyabi Tashiro, Ryota Sasaki, Saori Hiratsuka and Yasunobu Kousokabe designed the characters, in addition of K. Kinoshita and Tomonobu Kagawa designing the computer graphics and first boss respectively. The soundtrack was co-written by Zuntata members Kazuko Umino and Koji Sakurai. In a 2007 forum post at French website SHMUP, unused sprites from the unreleased Toaplan arcade game Dynamic Trial 7 were discovered to be hidden in Gekirindan's code by a community member.

Gekirindan was released in arcades in September 1995, using the Taito F3 System board. On 17 November the same year, an album featuring music from the game was co-published exclusively in Japan by Scitron and Pony Canyon. After its launch, the game was showcased at the JAMMA 95 along with Dangerous Curves and Puzzle Bobble 2. The title was later ported by Japan Media Programming to the Sega Saturn and published exclusively in Japan by Virgin Interactive Entertainment in April 1997, featuring various changes compared to the original version. In 2006, it was included in the compilation Taito Legends 2 for PlayStation 2, Windows and Xbox.

== Reception ==
Reception

Review scores
Publication	Score
Famitsu	(Saturn) 43 / 100
Sega Saturn Magazine (JP)	(Saturn) 4.33 / 10

In Japan, Game Machine listed Gekirindan on their December 15, 1995 issue as being the ninth most-successful arcade game of the month, outperforming titles such as Tekken 2 and Marvel Super Heroes. Retro Gamer's Phil Abel stated that "Gekirindan will probably never reach classic status. Even so, it still holds its own against many of its contemporaries. Out of all the arcade shooters released in 1995 Gekirindan is definitely above average; it's no DonPachi but certainly worth a play".
