= Hellfire (video game) =

1989 video game

- Japanese arcade flyer
- Developer: Toaplan (Note: Genesis/Mega Drive version developed by NCS Corporation; PC Engine CD-ROM² version developed by NEC Avenue.)
- Publishers: Taito: Arcade; JP: Taito; NA: U.S.A. Games Genesis; JP: Masaya; NA: Seismic; PAL: Sega CD-ROM² NEC Avenue
- Designer: Yuko Tataka
- Artist: Kōetsu Iwabuchi
- Composer: Tatsuya Uemura
- Platforms: Arcade, Genesis/Mega Drive, PC Engine CD-ROM²
- Release: Arcade: JP: April 1989; NA: September 1989; Genesis/Mega Drive: JP: 28 September 1990; NA: November 1990; PAL: 1991; CD-ROM²: JP: 12 April 1991
- Genre: Scrolling shooter
- Modes: Single-player, multiplayer

Hellfire (Note: Japanese: ヘルファイヤー, Hepburn: Herufaiyā) is a 1989 horizontally scrolling shooter video game developed by Toaplan and published by Taito for Japanese arcades; in North America, it was distributed by U.S.A. Games. The first horizontal shoot 'em up title to be created by Toaplan, the game takes place in the year 2998, where a space matter known as Black Nebula, created by robot dictator Super Mech, spreads and threatens to engulf human-controlled galaxies. Players assume the role of Space Federation member Captain Lancer, taking control of the CNCS1 spacecraft in a surprise attack to overthrow the enemies using the spacecraft's titular weapon.

Hellfire was conceived by Tatsuya Uemura during his time at Toaplan, and was developed in conjunction with Truxton. It served as an experiment to translate the company's shoot 'em up gameplay style in a horizontal format, but faced a problematic development cycle and went through various changes before its eventual launch for arcades in 1989. The game was then ported to the Sega Genesis by NCS Corporation in 1990, followed by the PC Engine CD-ROM² by NEC Avenue in 1991. Each version of the title features various additions and changes compared with the original release.

Hellfire was met with positive reception from video game magazines since its release in arcades, though some critics drew comparison with Irem's R-Type due to its gameplay style. The Genesis port was also met with positive response from reviewers, while the PC Engine CD-ROM² was received with similar response. Its engine would later be repurposed into Zero Wing. As of 2019, the rights to the game are owned by Tatsujin, a company founded in 2017 by former Toaplan member Masahiro Yuge and an affiliate of Japanese arcade manufacturer exA-Arcadia, alongside many other Toaplan IPs.

== Gameplay ==
Arcade version screenshot

Hellfire is a science fiction-themed horizontally scrolling shooter where players control the CNCS1 spacecraft through six increasingly difficult levels in a surprise attack effort to overthrow Super Mech, his army and the Black Nebula space matter. Each level has a boss at the end that must be fought before progressing any further. As far as horizontal scrolling shooters go, the title initially appears to be very standard, as players control their craft over a constantly scrolling background and the scenery never stops moving until the stage boss is reached.

A unique gameplay feature is the weapon system, which features four main weapons at the beginning that can be upgraded by picking up "P" icons. The player can switch between them by pressing the change button, with each one shooting at a fixed direction no matter which way the player moves. Other items can also be picked up along the way, such as speed increasers and "B" icons that grant a number of points, which are crucial for reaching high scores to obtain extra lives. The Genesis version introduces the titular main weapon as a bomb capable of obliterating any enemy caught within its blast radius, as well as a shield and a satellite "option".

Depending on the settings in the arcade version, Hellfire uses either a checkpoint system, in which a downed single player will start off at the beginning of the checkpoint they managed to reach before dying, or a respawn system where their ship immediately starts at the location they died at. Getting hit by enemy fire or colliding against solid stage obstacles will result in the player losing a life, as well as a penalty of decreasing the ship's firepower and speed to its original state. Once all lives are lost, the game is over unless the player inserts more credits to continue playing. Although there is an ending, the game loops back to the first stage after completing the last stage, as with previous titles from Toaplan; the difficulty increases with each loop, and enemies fire denser bullet patterns.

== Plot ==
The plot summary of Hellfire varies between each version. The story takes place in 2998, where humankind has reached a great point in intergalactic travel and space colonization with the help of a peaceful society. However, a mysterious space matter known as Black Nebula appears and begins engulfing different stars before reaching the latest galaxy colonized by humans. It is eventually revealed that the force behind this matter is Super Mech, a mysterious robot dictator from the farthest regions of space, with the only intention to destroy any resistance that it and its massive space armada faces. Captain Lancer, a member of the Space Federation, decides to initiate a surprise attack against Super Mech by piloting the only available space fighter craft, the CNCS1, loaded with Hellfire, the strongest weapon in the galaxy. In the arcade and Genesis versions, Lancer returns safely to Earth after having defeated the Black Nebula, while the PC Engine CD-ROM² version features a more poignant ending where the character Kaoru takes her own life in a heroic act of self-sacrifice in order to save the Earth.

== Development ==
Most of the enemies and bosses were hand-drawn sketches created by Iwabuchi before being transposed to pixel art graphics.

Hellfire's creation was helmed by Tatsuya Uemura, a former video game composer whose previous development works at Toaplan included Tiger-Heli, Flying Shark, and Twin Cobra. Serving as Toaplan's first horizontal shooter, Hellfire was developed in conjunction with Truxton as an experiment to translate Toaplan's vertical shooter gameplay in a Gradius-style format. However, the team faced several issues during the development cycle due to lack of experience, among other factors.

Uemura and members of the team struggled with various aspects of designing a horizontal shooter that proved to be frustrating for them, like the terrain and collision detection; their previous experience with vertical shooters did not carry over a horizontal format. Kōetsu Iwabuchi, who previously worked on Twin Cobra, was responsible for the artwork, stating in a 1990 interview with Gamest that he had no limitation when creating the designs. Uemura also requested for the project to have a puzzle element to be integrated. Both the single-player and co-op versions were also created from the beginning of development due to pressure to make two-player games at the time. Despite the difficulties and changes during the creation process, the team managed to finish the project.

The Sega Genesis version of Hellfire was developed by most of the same staff as the original arcade version. In a 1990 interview with Japanese game magazine Beep! MegaDrive, designer Yuko Tataka stated that working with the Genesis proved to be equally difficult due to restrictions imposed by the hardware. The PC Engine CD-ROM² conversion was solely developed by NEC Avenue.

== Release ==
Sega Genesis screenshot

Hellfire was released for arcades in Japan and North America in October 1989, with Taito handling distribution for the former region and U.S.A. Games releasing the game in the latter region. It was one of first releases from Toaplan to prominently feature their name in public. An album containing music from Hellfire and other Toaplan games was released exclusively in Japan by Datam Polystar in June 1989.

On 28 September 1990, Hellfire was ported to the Sega Genesis by NCS Corporation and first released in Japan by Masaya. It was released in North America by Seismic in November of the same year, while Sega released it in Europe in 1991. The Genesis version is similar to the arcade version, but has a number of key differences, such as a smaller color palette and lower screen resolution (which led to sprites being recolored and the graphics redrawn in different ways), an arranged soundtrack, and new items. The Genesis version was later re-released by independent publisher Retro-Bit in 2020.

On 12 April 1991, a version for the PC Engine Super CD-ROM², developed by NEC Avenue, was released under the name Hellfire S. (Note: ヘルファイヤー S (Herufaiyā S)) This version also features notable differences from the other versions, including a remixed, more orchestral soundtrack, animated cutscenes, and the replacement of Lancer with a female protagonist named Kaoru (voiced by seiyū Yumi Tōma).

== Reception ==
Aggregate scores
Aggregator	Scores		
Aggregator	Arcade	Genesis	PCE CD-ROM²
GameRankings	—N/a	59.17%	—N/a
Review scores
Publication	Scores		
Publication	Arcade	Genesis	PCE CD-ROM²
ACE	3/5	600 / 1000	—N/a
Aktueller Software Markt	—N/a	8 / 12	—N/a
AllGame	2.5/5	2.5/5	—N/a
Commodore User	78%	—N/a	—N/a
Computer and Video Games	—N/a	94% 94 / 100	—N/a
CVG Mean Machines	—N/a	93%	—N/a
Electronic Gaming Monthly	—N/a	31 / 40	—N/a
Famitsu	—N/a	29 / 40	24 / 40
GamePro	—N/a	21 / 25	—N/a
Gamers	—N/a	3	—N/a
Génération 4	7 / 10	—N/a	—N/a
Hobby Consolas	—N/a	94 / 100	—N/a
Joypad	—N/a	95%	—N/a
Joystick	—N/a	97%	72% 72%
Mean Machines	—N/a	93%	—N/a
Mega Drive Advanced Gaming	—N/a	72%	—N/a
Mega Drive Fan	—N/a	18.26 / 30	—N/a
Mega Force	—N/a	90%	—N/a
MegaTech	—N/a	90% 89% 93%	—N/a
Micromanía	—N/a	44 / 60	—N/a
Play Time	—N/a	72%	—N/a
Player One	—N/a	84%	—N/a
Power Play	—N/a	84%	—N/a
Raze	—N/a	82%	—N/a
Score	—N/a	60%	—N/a
Sega Force	—N/a	92%	—N/a
Sega Power	—N/a	5/5	—N/a
Sega Pro	—N/a	94 / 100	—N/a
Tilt	—N/a	14 / 20	—N/a
Your Sinclair	78° / 100°	—N/a	—N/a
Video Games	—N/a	82%	—N/a
Awards
Publication(s)		Award(s)	
Video Games (1991)		#7 Besten Mega-Drive-Spiele	
MegaTech (1992)		Hyper Game	
Mega (1992)		#4 Top Mega Drive Games of All Time	

In Japan, Game Machine listed Hellfire as the 14th most successful table arcade unit of June 1989, outperforming titles such as Wrestle War and Strider. Den of Geek noted it to be "a rare foray into the world of horizontally-scrolling shooters" for Toaplan. The Genesis version was well received. MegaTech magazine said it was "a slick and very good looking blaster which oozes playability". Mega placed the game at number four on their list of the "Top Mega Drive Games of All Time".

== Legacy ==
After the initial release of Hellfire in arcades, Toaplan would go on to develop their second and last horizontal shooter Zero Wing, which was released the same year and shared the same game engine. The rights to Helfire and many other IPs from Toaplan are now owned by Tatsujin, a company named after Truxton's Japanese title, which was founded in 2017 by former Toaplan employee Masahiro Yuge; the company has been part of Embracer Group since 2022.
