= Batsugun =

1993 video game

- Developers: Toaplan exA-Arcadia (EXA Label)
- Publishers: JP: Toaplan; EU: Taito; KOR: Unite Trading; WW: exA-Arcadia
- Producer: Yuko Tataka
- Designers: Junya Inoue; Takeshi Kawamoto
- Programmers: Satoshi Kōyama; Seiji Iwakura; Tsuneki Ikeda
- Composer: Yoshitatsu Sakai
- Platforms: Arcade, exA-Arcadia, Saturn, PlayStation 4, Switch, Windows, Mac, Linux
- Release: WW: December 7, 1993; exA-Arcadia: WW: June 16, 2023
- Genres: Scrolling shooter, bullet hell
- Modes: Single-player, multiplayer

Batsugun (Note: Japanese: バツグン; lit. "Exceptional" or "Extraordinary") is a 1993 vertically scrolling shooter bullet hell arcade video game developed and published by Toaplan in Japan and Europe by Taito, as well as Korea by Unite Trading. The last shoot 'em up created by Toaplan, the title takes place on a distant Earth-like planet where a global takeover operative led by king Renoselva A. Gladebaran VII is set into motion, as players assume the role from one of the six fighter pilots conforming the Skull Hornets squadron taking control of submersible jets in a last-ditch effort to overthrow the invading military force from the planet. Its gameplay mainly consists of shooting mixed with role-playing game-esque elements using a main two-button configuration.

Headed by Fire Shark designer Yuko Tataka, Batsugun was created by most of the same team that previously worked on several projects at Toaplan and who would later go on to join one of its offshoots after the company declared bankruptcy in 1994 to continue working in the bullet hell sub-genre. Though first launched for the arcades, the game was later ported to the Sega Saturn by Gazelle and published exclusively in Japan by Banpresto on 25 October 1996, featuring various changes and additions compared with the original version.

Batsugun garnered positive reception from during its initial release in arcades but was later met with mixed critical reception on the Saturn as an import title. Nevertheless, the game garnered awards from Gamest magazine. It has been heralded by many as the first manic shooter due to its evolution of various gameplay features in the shoot 'em up genre and as an inspiration for other similar titles. As of 2019, the rights to the project are owned by Tatsujin, a company founded in 2017 by former Toaplan member Masahiro Yuge and now-subsidiary of Swedish video game and media holding company, Embracer Group, alongside many other Toaplan IPs.

== Gameplay ==
Arcade screenshot

Batsugun is a science fiction-themed vertically scrolling bullet hell game where players assume the role of one of the six Skull Hornets pilots taking control of their respective fighter jets through five increasingly difficult levels in a last-ditch effort to overthrow a global takeover led by the army of king Renoselva A. Gladebaran VII as the main objective. The title initially appears to be standard; players control their craft over a constantly scrolling background and the scenery never stops moving until a boss is reached. Players also have only two weapons at their disposal: the main gun that travels a max distance of the screen's height and three bombs capable of obliterating any enemy caught within its blast radius.

A unique gameplay feature is the weapon system; as enemies are destroyed, players gain experience points that are separate from the score and for every experience points gained, the main gun is leveled up and becomes much stronger. This is analogous to exp and levelling up in role-playing games. The weapon can only level up twice and after achieving its maximum level, experience points will grant players an extra bomb stock instead. In addition, player can also grab "P" icons to increase the power of the current level gun. A maximum of five "P" icons can be collected per experience level and getting more after this gives extra points instead, while collecting "B" icons increases the number of bomb stock to a maximum of seven. Another gameplay feature, reminiscent of Aero Fighters, is the ability to choose between three fighter ship variations: Sky Mirage (type A), Dragon's Whisper (type B) and Judgement Flasher (type C). Type A ships have a simple array of rapid-fire energy-beams that spread evenly. Type B ships shoot a straight beam of lightning for as long as the fire button is held, while tapping the button causes sparks to appear and travel along the beam. Lastly, Type C ships are adaptable; holding the fire button shoot energy waves straight, while tapping the button fires a spread of projectiles. Each ship type becomes more powerful by leveling up.

There are multiple scoring methods for reaching high-scores to obtain extra lives in the game apart from destroying enemies, which are awarded at one million points. Points can be gained from collecting V-shaped gold medals and once the level is finished, points are awarded for every type of medal collected. Firing or bombing on determined locations is also crucial to reach high-scores, as certain setpieces in some stages hosts bonus secrets within their scenery, as well as destroying enemies on certain spots. The game employs a respawn system where a downed single player will start off immediately at the location they died at. Getting hit by enemy fire will result in losing a life, as well as a penalty of decreasing the ship's firepower to its original state, in addition of all medals collected and once all lives are lost, the game is over unless the player inserts more credits into the arcade machine to continue playing. Unlike previous shoot 'em ups titles from Toaplan, there are no additional loops after completing the last stage.

== Plot ==
The plot summary of Batsugun is explained through supplementary materials. On a distant planet similar to Earth, a global takeover codenamed Epsilon Plan led by king Renoselva A. Gladebaran VII is set into motion, with the Imperial Army successfully staging multiple coup d'états upon countries of the planet in less than two weeks. All that stands between the military forces of Renoselva and world domination are the Skull Hornets: a squadron of fighter pilots led by prince Olisis R. Gladebaran VIII, son of Renoselva. The Skull Hornets utilize the most powerful submersible jets the planet's scientists have ever devised.

=== Characters ===
- Jeeno: Pilot of the Type A (P1) ship, he is a teenage soldier with cybernetic implants by Dr. Gabriel and a tragic past.
- Schneider: Pilot of the Type A (P2) ship and a war veteran who was previously cryogenized and is the main protagonist of Flying Shark.
- Beltiana: Pilot of the Type B (P1) ship and a young woman who seeks to avenge the death of her brother.
- Alteeno: Pilot of the Type B (P2) ship, he is a tomboyish mechanic of the Skull Hornets squadron and a child prodigy.
- Iceman: Pilot of the Type C (P1) ship and a hired mercenary with a turbulent past.
- Olisis: Pilot of the Type C (P2) ship. Founder and director of the Skull Hornets squadron, he is the exiled prince of his home planet and fights to dethrone his father Renoselva.

== Development ==
Batsugun was created by most of the same team that previously worked on several projects at Toaplan such as Grind Stormer and who would later go on to join one of its offshoots after the company declared bankruptcy in 1994 to continue working in the bullet hell sub-genre. Its development was helmed by a small group at the company and most of the members had several roles during this process, with Fire Shark designer Yuko Tataka acting as both producer and co-designer alongside artists Junya Inoue and Takeshi Kawamoto. Cave co-founder Tsuneki Ikeda served as one of its programmers prior to DonPachi alongside Satoshi Kōyama, Seiji Iwakura and composer Yoshitatsu Sakai. Both Ikeda and Inoue have stated that several games from other companies that were popular at the time served as influence early in development.

== Release ==
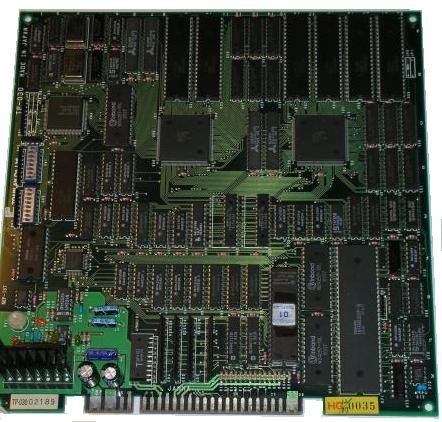
Batsugun Special Version Arcade printed circuit board

Batsugun was first launched in arcades worldwide by Toaplan, Taito and Unite Trading in 1993. During the same year, a soundtrack album containing music from the title was co-published exclusively in Japan by Scitron and Pony Canyon. Several promotional materials were also released by Toaplan.

A second edition, titled Batsugun Special Version, was showcased to attendees at the 1994 AOU Show in Japan but was never officially released in arcades, as Toaplan slid into bankruptcy and this special version appeared on the secondary video game collecting market after the company vanished. The special version featured a number of changes compared to the original version including a much smaller hitbox, a shield protecting the player from one hit, more powerful bombs, new scoring items, and the addition of multiple loops of increasing difficulty after completing the initial loop, among other changes.

On 25 October 1996, Batsugun received a conversion to the Sega Saturn by Gazelle, an offshoot of Toaplan, and published exclusively in Japan by Banpresto. The Saturn version featured various changes and additions such as the inclusion of both the original and special versions as a 2-in-1 package, as well as an arranged soundtrack.

In 2022, the original arcade version was included as part of the Sega Astro City Mini V, a vertically oriented variant of the Sega Astro City mini console. In 2023, the Saturn version was ported to PlayStation 4, Xbox One, Nintendo Switch, and PC under the title Batsugun Saturn Tribute Boosted. This modern version includes new features such as a "Boost Up HUD" which displays extra information and an increased maximum score. In 2024 Batsugun was released on PC through Steam. The port and new features were handled by Bitwave Games. In November 2024 both Batsugun and Batsugun Special Version were included on the Toaplan Arcade Collection 3 cartridge for the Evercade system.

== EXA Label ==
In June 2023, Batsugun EXA Label was released in arcades by exA-Arcadia. Besides including the existing Original Arcade and Special modes, a Special' (Special Dash) mode is included which condenses the original Special 4-loop mode into a 1-loop mode. A newly created mode called EXA Label focuses on scoring and bomb usage while allowing the player to select from all pilots instead of being restricted to a set of 3 pilots. Input lag has been decreased to 1 frame. All pilots are now voiced and a new arranged soundtrack by Keishi Yonao has been added. The original character designer, Junya Inoue, created new illustrations for this release.

== Reception ==
Reception

Review scores
Publication	Score
Edge	(Saturn) 7 / 10
Famitsu	(Saturn) 25 / 40
Joypad	(Saturn) 4 / 5
M! Games	(Saturn) 50%
Saturn Fan	(Saturn) 6.8/10
Sega Saturn Magazine (JP)	(Saturn) 7.33 / 10

Award
Publication	Award
Gamest (1994)	Best Shooting Award 6th, Best Character '94 36th (Arcade)

Batsugun was met with positive reception during its initial release in arcades. In Japan, Game Machine listed it on their February 1, 1994 issue as being the seventh most-popular arcade game at the time. In the April 1994 issue of Japanese publication Micom BASIC Magazine, the game was ranked on the number nine spot in popularity. Gamest simultaneously awarded the title with both the 6th "Best Shooting" and 36th "Best Character '94" awards. Nick Zverloff of Hardcore Gaming 101 praised Inoue and Sakai's artwork and soundtrack respectively, among other aspects.

The Sega Saturn conversion received mixed reviews from critics such as Famitsu and the Japanese Sega Saturn Magazine. According to Famitsu, the Saturn version sold over 7,017 copies in its first week on the market. Readers of the Japanese Sega Saturn Magazine voted to give the Saturn port an 8.4 out of 10 score, ranking at the number 245 spot, indicating a large popular following. Edge reviewed the Saturn version, deeming it "not a classic in designs terms, perhaps, but one that won't disappoint those yearning a show-off 2D title". French magazine Joypad commended the Saturn released for its boss encounters, arsenal, multiplayer and game modes, stating that "taken from the arcade game of the same name, this Saturn shoot'em-up isn't just another shoot, it's the game to own if you want to see how the genre has evolved today". Christian Blendl of German magazine MAN!AC gave the Saturn an overall mixed outlook. Zverloff of Hardcore Gaming 101 criticized some of the additions in the Saturn conversion such as the arranged soundtrack.

== Legacy ==
Batsugun has been regarded by multiple publications as the first manic shooter due to its evolution of complex enemy waves, bullet patterns, firepower and hitbox. Mark R. Johnson, an author at The University of Sydney in Australia, noted that its first boss unveiled a number of on-screen bullets players never witnessed before. In addition, the game was also cited as an inspiration for other titles in the shoot 'em up genre since its release such as Cho Ren Sha 68K and Eschatos.

After the initial launch of Batsugun, Toaplan would cease development of shooting projects prior to their closure on March 31, 1994. A sequel was planned but never released, although Inoue stated that the idea of gender-based firepower pairing envisionsed for the title was integrated into Progear. In more recent years, the rights to the title and many other IPs from Toaplan are now owned by Tatsujin, a company named after Truxton's Japanese title that was founded in 2017 by Masahiro Yuge, and is part of Embracer Group since 2022.
