= Wardner (video game) =

1987 video game

- North American arcade flyer
- Developer: Toaplan
- Publisher: Taito
- Designer: Etsuhiro Wada
- Composer: Osamu Ōta
- Platforms: Arcade, Famicom Disk System, Sega Genesis
- Release: Arcade: JP: September 20, 1987; NA: December 1987; Famicom Disk System: JP: March 25, 1988; Genesis: JP: April 26, 1991; NA: May 1991
- Genre: Platform
- Modes: Single-player, multiplayer

Wardner (Note: Also known as Forest of Wardner (Japanese: ワードナの森, Hepburn: Wardner no Mori) in Japan and Pyros in North America on the arcades) is a 1987 platform game developed by Toaplan and published by Taito for arcades. Players assume the role of a child named Dover on a journey to rescue his kidnapped girlfriend Mia from the titular warlock. The game was later ported to the Famicom Disk System and Sega Genesis, with both ports featuring several changes and additions compared to the original version. Conversions for both the Nintendo Entertainment System and PC Engine were also in development but never released.

Wardner was met with positive reception from video game magazines since its release in arcades, though reviewers drew comparison with Capcom's Ghosts 'n Goblins due to its gameplay style, while the Genesis version was met with mixed reviews after launch. As of 2019, the rights to the title are owned by Tatsujin, a company founded in 2017 by former Toaplan member Masahiro Yuge, which is now an affiliate of Japanese arcade manufacturer exA-Arcadia, alongside many other Toaplan IPs.

== Gameplay ==
Arcade version

Wardner is a side-scrolling action-platform game similar to Ghosts 'n Goblins and Rastan where players control Dover, the main protagonist, through five stages (six in the Genesis version) of varying themes set in a fantasy land. Dover must rescue his girlfriend Mia from the titular antagonist by defeating his servants, some of whom act as a boss at the end of a stage, in order to progress further on the journey.

Some of the levels featured are linear in nature, populated with obstacles and enemies, requiring the player to traverse the stage by running, jumping, climbing, shooting or dodging enemies. Other levels featured later in the game become more maze-like and exploratory, making the player take different routes to reach the end. Along the way, gold orbs can be picked up by defeating enemies to increase the player character's firepower, as well as money that is used in shops at the end of each stage to acquire protective items and new attacks, though some of them can also be obtained during the level.

The game hosts a number of hidden bonus secrets to be found on certain setpieces within the scenery, which is also crucial for reaching high-scores to obtain extra lives. The title uses a checkpoint system in which a downed single player will respawn at the beginning of the checkpoint they managed to reach before dying. Getting hit by enemy fire, colliding with solid stage obstacles, falling off the stage or running out of time will result in losing a life. Once all lives are lost, the game is over unless the player inserts more credits to continue playing.

== Development and release ==
Wardner was released in arcades by Taito in 1987, while the North American version was distributed under the name Pyros. Osamu Ōta served as composer for the game's soundtrack under the alias "Ree", in one of his first video game roles prior to Twin Hawk and Snow Bros.. Former Toaplan composer Masahiro Yuge stated in a 2012 interview with Japanese publication Shooting Gameside that Ōta joined the company when their staff was small. Tatsuya Uemura stated in a 2009 interview that the project was created by Etsuhiro Wada and was also influenced by Wizardry. In June 1989, an album containing music from Wardner and other Toaplan games was published exclusively in Japan by Datam Polystar.

A port of Wardner for the Famicom Disk System, developed by Daiei Seisakusho, was released exclusively in Japan by Taito on 25 March 1988. A version for the Nintendo Entertainment System was developed and planned to be published by Sammy in North America under the name Pyross. This version was showcased to the public during the Summer Consumer Electronics Show 1990.

On 26 April 1991, a reworked port of the game was developed for the Sega Genesis developed and published by Visco Corporation and first released in Japan by under the name Wardner no Mori Special, with a North American release by Mentrix Software following in May. In 1988, a version for the PC Engine was announced to be in development by NEC Avenue under the helm of Prototype founder Toshio Tabeta; despite being previewed, the project was then moved on to the PC Engine CD-ROM² and ultimately to the PC Engine Super CD-ROM² before being cancelled after multiple delays, despite work on the port being completed.

Japanese company M2 published every game by Toaplan (excluding Mahjong Sisters and Enma Daiō) for consoles in Japan, including Wardner. In 2022, both the arcade and the Famicom Disk System versions were included in the Hishou Same! Same! Same! compilation for Nintendo Switch and PlayStation 4 as part of M2's Toaplan Arcade Garage label as downloadable content.

== Reception and legacy ==
Reception

Aggregate score
Aggregator	Score
GameRankings	(Genesis) 60%

Review scores
Publication	Score
ACE	(Genesis) 710 / 1000
Aktueller Software Markt	(Genesis) 6 / 12
Beep! MegaDrive	(Genesis) 27 / 40
Famitsu	(FDS) 24 / 40 (Genesis) 21 / 40
GamePro	(Genesis) 21 / 25
Games-X	(Genesis) 80%
Joystick	(Genesis) 83% (Genesis) 84%
Tilt	(Genesis) 17 / 20
Ação Games	(Genesis) 6 / 12
Commodore User	(Arcade) 7 / 10
Famimaga	(FDS) 14.80 / 25
Génération 4	(Genesis) 71%
Mean Machines	(Genesis) 84%
Mega Drive Advanced Gaming	(Genesis) 43% (Genesis) 48% (Genesis) 53%
Mega Drive Fan	(Genesis) 13.06 / 30
MegaTech	(Genesis) 75%
Power Play	(Genesis) 72%
Sega Power	(Genesis) 4/5 (Genesis) 43%
Sega Pro	(Genesis) 54 / 100 (Genesis) 25 / 100 (Genesis) 48 / 100

In Japan, Game Machine listed Wardner as the ninth most successful table arcade unit of October 1987, outperforming titles such as Arkanoid: Revenge of Doh and Black Tiger. Wardner was met with positive reception from critics, many of whom compared it to Capcom's Ghosts 'n Goblins. Mike Pattenden of Commodore User praised the presentation, visuals and challenge. Clare Edgeley of Computer and Video Games gave positive remarks to the gameplay and level design. Likewise, both Robin Hogg and Cameron Pound from The Games Machine commended the visuals, action, and gameplay. Although Crash's Steve Jarratt and Julian Rignall noted its lack of originality, they praised the gameplay. Den of Geek, however, regarded it to be a solid but forgettable title from Toaplan.

The Sega Genesis version received a more mixed reception on Sega Genesis from reviewers.

In more recent years, the rights to the game and many other IPs from Toaplan are now owned by Tatsujin, a company named after Truxton's Japanese title that was founded in 2017 by Masahiro Yuge, and is part of Embracer Group since 2022.
