= Grind Stormer =

1993 video game

- Developers: Toaplan; Tengen (Genesis)
- Publishers: Toaplan; Tengen (Genesis)
- Director: Kenichi Takano
- Programmers: Seiji Iwakura; Tsuneki Ikeda
- Artists: Mikio Yamaguchi; Yusuke Naora
- Composer: Masahiro Yuge
- Platforms: Arcade, Genesis
- Release: Arcade: JP/NA: March 1993; Mega Drive/Genesis: JP: March 25, 1994; NA: April 1994
- Genre: Scrolling shooter
- Modes: Single-player, multiplayer

Grind Stormer (Note: Also known as V・V (Japanese: ヴィ・ファイヴ, Hepburn: Vu~i Faivu; lit. "Vee Five") in Japan.) is a 1993 vertically scrolling shooter arcade video game originally developed and published by Toaplan in Japan and North America. It is considered to be the spiritual successor to Slap Fight. Based around a video game within a video game concept, players assume the role of a young secret agent assigned by the government taking control of the NA-00 space fighter craft in an attempt to defeat the titular virtual reality simulator, rescue the abducted players who lost against it and unveil its true purpose.

Headed by DonPachi producer Kenichi Takano, Grind Stormer was created by a small development team of new employees at Toaplan who would later go on to work at one of its offshoots after the company declared bankruptcy in 1994 and was originally titled Bakuretsu Wing before being ultimately renamed to V・V in Japan. It is notable for marking the debut of Cave co-founder Tsuneki Ikeda in the video game industry, serving as one of its programmers and features a much smaller hitbox for the ship compared with previous shoot 'em up games released at the time. It is also notable for being one of the last games by Toaplan to feature an FM soundtrack, as the company began to clear out their FM chip inventory. Initially launched for the arcades, the game was later ported to the Sega Genesis by Tengen and first published in Japan on 25 March 1994 and a month later in North America, featuring both the original Japanese and North American versions as selectable gameplay modes.

Grind Stormer proved to be popular in arcades but the game has been met with mixed reception from critics and reviewers alike since its release on the Genesis, who felt divided in regards to several aspects such as the presentation, visuals, sound design and gameplay. It has been regarded by some to be an early example of a manic shooter. As of 2019, its rights are owned by Tatsujin, a company founded in 2017 by former Toaplan member Masahiro Yuge alongside many other Toaplan IPs.

== Gameplay ==
Arcade screenshot

Grind Stormer is a science fiction-themed vertically scrolling shoot 'em up game where players assume the role of a young secret agent assigned by the government taking control of the NA-00 space fighter craft through six stages in an effort to defeat the titular VR game, rescue the abducted players who lost against it and unveil its true purpose as the main objective. As far as vertical scrolling shooters go, the game initially appears to be very standard but the power-up and scoring systems change depending on the version being played. In Grind Stormer, players have the normal weapon layout with instant power-ups and bomb icons. This version also has speed-up icons as well as speed-down icons, and higher value point items. In V・V, however, the players collect gems that allow them to choose between multiple weapons through a power meter system reminiscent of Gradius and Slap Fight instead, removing the bombs and weapon icons completely. This version also has a shield power-up not featured in the former version as well.

Each version of the game features three types of weapons to choose from: Shot, Search and Missile. Shot is the standard vulcan weapon players start with at the beginning and can fire in different directions depending on their arrangement, but the ship's firepower increases into one large beam when the options are focused and held on at close range. Search is a satellite-only weapon that turns the options into homing devices that seek out any enemies on the screen (even if they were invulnerable), and changes the ship's color into light violet once equipped. Missile, as the name implies, fires non-homing rockets with a high firing rate and power, while the options follow the ship in the "snake" or "shadow" style, though the item will turn the ship's color into blue once equipped.

In some occasions, players can pick up point icons that constantly changes its value as well as a 1UP icon. Similar to Dogyuun and Gun Frontier, the game hosts a number of hidden bonus secrets to be found, which is also crucial for reaching high-scores to obtain extra lives. The title uses a checkpoint system in which a downed single player will start off at the beginning of the checkpoint they managed to reach before dying. Getting hit by enemy fire or colliding against solid stage obstacles will result in losing a live, as well as a penalty of decreasing the ship's firepower to its original state and once all lives are lost, the game is over unless the player insert more credits into the arcade machine to continue playing. As with previous shoot 'em ups from Toaplan, the game loops back to the first stage after completing the last stage, with the second loop increasing in difficulty and enemies fire denser bullet patterns as well as spawning extra bullets when destroyed (sometimes called 'suicide bullets' or 'ricochet effect'). Defeating the second loop results in achieving the true ending.

== Plot ==
The plot summary of Grind Stormer varies between each version. In the original arcade versions, the game is based around a video game within a video game concept and takes place in the year 2210, where 'the ultimate arcade machine' called Grind Stormer/V・V has finally been released to the public. A VR shooting game, it became so addictive that the government assigned a young secret agent to investigate the arcade phenomenon in order to question its true purpose and to perform the impossible: to beat the game by taking control of the NA-00 space fighter craft, as those who played and lost against it were abducted as a result. In the Sega Genesis version, players assume the role of the last surviving Terran Defense Force fighter pilot taking control of the titular fighter craft in order repel an alien race known as the Zeta Reticulli from invading Earth.

== Development ==
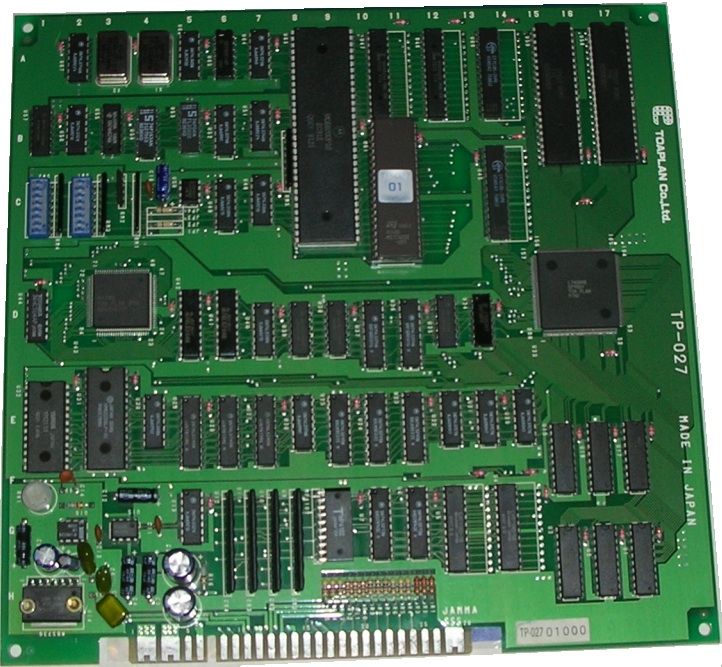
Grind Stormer Arcade PCB

Grind Stormer was created by a small team of new employees at Toaplan, who would later go on to work at one of its offshoots after the company declared bankruptcy in 1994, and was originally titled Bakuretsu Wing before being ultimately renamed to V・V in Japan. Its development was helmed by director Kenichi Takano, with artists Mikio Yamaguchi and Yusuke Naora acting as graphic designers, while composer Masahiro Yuge wrote the soundtrack. Guardian and Twin Cobra artist Kōetsu Iwabuchi also served as the project's planning manager.

Cave co-founder Tsuneki Ikeda served as one of the game's programmers in his first video game role prior to Batsugun and DonPachi alongside Seiji Iwakura and he has recounted about Grind Stormer's development process in various interviews across publications such as Monthly Arcadia. Ikeda stated that the project was conceived as a "training exercise" for the small team, as they received a sample game program containing basic elements from the shoot 'em up genre to work with, which served as a basis to add other elements and Ikeda claimed that the project was pitched as a spiritual successor to Slap Fight. He also stated that the sample program contained a smaller hitbox for the ship and went unnoticed as the team proceeded on making the game. During initial testings at Toaplan, one of the company's senior programmers gave positive feedback in regards to bullet dodging due to the small hitbox and considered it to be better than Truxton II, encouraging Ikeda and the team to work with the format. When developing the game, Ikeda was influenced by Salamander.

Yuge taught to the new development crew technical guidance so he could let them develop much of the project on their own and he has since stated on interviews that the reason for composing the soundtrack in FM rather than both it and PCM as with Truxton II was due to the company beginning to clear out their FM chip inventory for business reasons in order to keep PCB manufacturing costs low, despite internal conflicts and served as one of the last releases by Toaplan to feature an FM soundtrack. Yuge also worked under a 128 kilobytes memory limit for the sound driver, prompting him to come up with programming tricks to overcome such limit.

== Release ==
Sega Genesis screenshot

Grind Stormer was first released on arcades across Japan and North America in 1993. The same year on 21 May, an album was co-published exclusively in Japan by Scitron and Pony Canyon. It was featured on a Japanese TV show.

Grind Stormer later received a conversion to the Sega Genesis by Tengen and was first published in Japan on 25 March 1994 and later in North America on April of the same year. The Genesis port included both the Japanese (V・V) and North American (Grind Stormer) versions as a 2-in-1 package but has a number of key differences such as having a smaller color palette that lead to sprites being recolored in different ways, along with other presentation and gameplay changes from the original arcade releases. The North American release has since become one of the more expensive titles on the platform, due to manufacturing errors that resulted in a defective cartridge print run as a result, with copies of the port fetching over US$160 on the secondary video game collecting market.

In 2022, the original arcade version was included as part of the Sega Astro City Mini V, a vertically-oriented variant of the Sega Astro City mini console.

== Reception ==
Reception

Review scores
| Publication | Score |
|---|---|
| Electronic Gaming Monthly | (GEN) 8/10, 6/10, 6/10, 7/10 |
| GamePro | (GEN) 15 / 20 |
| Beep! Mega Drive | (GEN) 7.0 / 10 |
| Gamest | (Arcade) 37/50 |
| Game Players | (GEN) 58% |
| Joypad | (GEN) 68% |
| MAN!AC | (GEN) 67% |
| Mean Machines Sega | (GEN) 82 / 100 |
| Mega | (GEN) 39% |
| Megablast | (GEN) 78% |
| Mega Fun | (GEN) 61% |
| MegaTech | (GEN) 54% |
| PlayStation Magazine | (GEN) 22.3/30 |
| Power Unlimited | (GEN) 80 / 100 |
| Sega Power | (GEN) 27% |
| Sega Pro | (GEN) 57 / 100 |
| Video Games | (GEN) 65% |

Award
| Publication | Award |
|---|---|
| Gamest Mook (1998) | Best Shooting Award 4th Annual Hit Game 30th (Arcade) |

In Japan, Game Machine listed Grind Stormer on their April 15, 1993 issue as being the eighth most-popular arcade game at the time. GamesMaster noted its "fast and furious" action. According to Masahiro Yuge, Grind Stormer proved to be popular in arcades and exceeded the company's expectations. Den of Geek noted it to be one of the titles from Toaplan which intensively pushed the formula established by their previous endeavors. Time Extension noted the game as historically significant to the evolution of the bullet hell format.

Reviewing the Genesis version, GamePro remarked that despite being not technologically innovative as Star Fox, they ultimately called Grind Stormer a colorful and fun game.

== Legacy ==
Grind Stormer has been regarded by some retrospective reviewers to be an early example of a manic shooter. The rights to the game and many other IPs from Toaplan are now owned by Tatsujin, a company named after Truxton's Japanese title that was founded in 2017 by Yuge, and is part of Embracer Group since 2022.
