= Ghox =

1991 video game

- Developer: Toaplan
- Publisher: Taito
- Composer: Miyoko Takaoka (uncredited)
- Platform: Arcade
- Release: WW: End of November 1991
- Genre: Action
- Modes: Single-player, multiplayer

Ghox (Note: Japanese: ゴークス, Hepburn: Gōkusu) is an action arcade video game developed by Toaplan and published by Taito in Japan and Europe in November 1991. It is notable for being one of the few titles by Toaplan that has not received any official port to home consoles as of date. Taking place in a fantasy world where the evil magician known as Jagula sealed the goddess Lucia in the netherworld, players assume the role of Axis and Bilious in an effort to defeat both Jagula and the unleashed evil spirits from the netherworld. As of 2019, the rights to the game are owned by Tatsujin, a company founded in 2017 by former Toaplan member Masahiro Yuge and now-affiliate of Japanese arcade manufacturer exA-Arcadia alongside many other IPs from the defunct studio.

== Gameplay ==
Gameplay screenshot

Ghox is an action game reminiscent of Devilish in which the players assume control of Axis (P1) and Bilious (P2), two men from the Eastern Country summoned by King Gitane of the Akuria empire, from a top-down perspective where the main objective on each stage is to break as many bricks and obstacles as possible from the playfield with a single ball by using the walls and/or the paddle to ricochet the ball back to eliminate them, while a boss at the end of every seventh stage must be fought before progressing any further in an effort to overthrow the evil magician Jagula from conquering the world along with his legion of unleashed evil spirits from the netherworld, in addition of rescuing the goddess Lucia from her captivity. Failing in making the ball rebound from the paddle will result in losing a life and once all lives are lost, the game is over unless the players insert more credits into the arcade machine to continue playing.

A unique gameplay feature is the ability to launch two balls instead of one at the start of each stage. Another unique gameplay feature is the ability to activate a bomb item that spawns multiple balls from a single ball, however only one bomb item is given to the players with every single life. Scattered on the playfield of every stage are treasure chests containing other useful items such as fairies, additional bomb stocks, money and heart-shaped 1UP icons. Colored crystal orbs (red, blue, green, yellow and purple) are also dropped from opening the treasure chests and by collecting five of the same color grants power-ups for the player characters. These power-ups are kept even after losing a life.

After the first area is completed, players are given two areas to select as the next one before reaching the fifth area. Depending on the actions taken during gameplay by the players, two possible outcomes can occur during the final boss sequence; if Jagula is defeated during this battle but Lucia is not rescued, it will automatically trigger the bad ending, forcing the players to restart the game from the beginning in order to achieve the good ending by fulfilling certain conditions.

== Development and release ==
According to former Toaplan designer Junya Inoue, Ghox was initially envisioned to be a vertically scrolling game but due to hardware issues, the project was retooled into a single-screen game instead. The game was released in arcades worldwide in November 1991. The soundtrack was composed by Miyoko Takaoka, although she is not credited as such in the game. An album containing music from the title, as well as Rally Bike and Teki Paki was published exclusively in Japan by City Connection under their Clarice Disk label in May 2018.

== Reception and legacy ==
Reception

Review scores
Publication	Score
Gamest	26/50
Game Zone	1.5/5; 3/5
Sinclair User	85%
Zero	1.5/5; 3.5/5

British and Spanish gaming magazines The One for Amiga Games and Micromanía gave an overall positive outlook to the game. John Cook of Sinclair User rated the game with a 85% score. In the April 1992 issue of Japanese publication Micom BASIC Magazine, the game was ranked on the number thirty spot in popularity. Retro Gamer regarded it as a graphically superior clone of Breakout.

In more recent years, the rights to Ghox and many other IPs from Toaplan are now owned by Tatsujin, a company named after Truxton's Japanese title that was founded in 2017 by former Toaplan employee Masahiro Yuge, and is part of Embracer Group since 2022.
