= Repulse (video game) =

1985 video game

- Japanese instruction card
- Developer: Crux
- Publisher: Sega (Note: Later published by Kyugo and Proma under the title '99: The Last War.)
- Director: Shunkō Miki
- Designers: Atsushi Kawaguchi; Hiroyasu Kobayashi; Minoru Harada
- Programmers: Shunkō Miki; Tatsuya Uemura
- Composer: Tatsuya Uemura
- Platform: Arcade
- Release: JP/NA: June 1985
- Genre: Fixed shooter
- Modes: Single-player, multiplayer
- Arcade system: Sega Kyugo

Repulse (Note: Japanese: リパルス, Hepburn: Riparusu; also known as '99: The Last War) is a 1985 fixed shooter video game developed by Crux and published by Sega for arcades. In the game, players battle against the invading Aquila nation to defend Earth from world domination. The title is notable for being created by most of the same team that previously worked on several projects at Orca and Crux before both companies declared bankruptcy, after which a group of employees from the two gaming divisions would go on to form Toaplan.

== Gameplay ==
Gameplay screenshot

Repulse is a fixed shooter reminiscent of Space Invaders and Phoenix, in which the player controls a laser cannon by moving it across the bottom of the screen and firing at robotic enemies and descending alien spaceships through six stages, five of which host a boss at the end that must be defeated in order to progress further. The players' laser cannon is equipped with a limited force shield to endure any kind of enemy attacks, though its energy drains both while activated and whenever the ship gets hit. Power-ups are dropped by ally helicopters and ships that bring to the players a faster shot than the normal one and refills the laser cannon's force field meter. Reaching certain score thresholds by shooting at the enemies results in extra lives. Once all lives are lost, The game is over, unless the player inserts more credits into the arcade machine to continue playing.

== Development and release ==
Repulse was created by most of the same team that previously worked on several projects at Orca and Crux before both companies declared bankruptcy, after which a group of employees from the two gaming divisions would go on to form Toaplan. Shunkō Miki served as the project's director, who shared the role of programmer with composer Tatsuya Uemura alongside designers Atsushi Kawaguchi, Hiroyasu Kobayashi and Minoru Harada. Uemura recounted the title's development process and history through various Japanese publications, stating that development lasted six months and worked on the project in conjunction with Performan for Toaplan, who recruited him for sound design, while he still formed part of Crux.

Repulse was released in arcades by Sega in June 1985. The game was one of the three titles that ran on Sega's Kyugo hardware. It was later renamed '99: The Last War when licensed to Kyugo, who developed the hardware, and Proma.

== Reception and legacy ==
Though Repulse saw success in its first few months on the market, the game did not garner attention from arcade players. The project became the last title developed by Crux to be released, as the company was dissolved during its development due to bankruptcy. Most of the former Crux members would later join Toaplan. A bootleg version of the game titled Son of Phoenix was also released.
