= Out Zone =

1990 video game

- Developer: Toaplan
- Publishers: JP: Tecmo; NA: Romstar; EU: Toaplan
- Designer: Naoki Ogiwara
- Composer: Tatsuya Uemura
- Platform: Arcade
- Release: WW: August 1990
- Genre: Run and gun
- Modes: Single-player, multiplayer

Out Zone (Note: Japanese: アウトゾーン, Hepburn: Auto Zōn) is a run and gun arcade video game developed by Toaplan and published in Japan by Tecmo, North America by Romstar and Europe in August 1990. Set in a future where an alien race from the fictional planet Owagira are threatening to wipe out humanity after multiple failed attempts to defend Earth against their attacks, players assume the role of cyborg mercenaries recruited by the United Nations in a last-ditch effort to overthrow the invaders.

Out Zone received positive reception from critics since its release and has been praised for its visuals, sound design, gameplay, multiplayer, challenge and overall intensity but some lamented the lack of a console release. A spiritual successor, FixEight, was released for arcades in July 1992. As of 2019, the rights to the title is owned by Tatsujin, a company founded in 2017 by former Toaplan member Masahiro Yuge and now-affiliate of Japanese arcade manufacturer exA-Arcadia alongside many other Toaplan IPs.

== Gameplay ==
Gameplay screenshot showcasing "Night Mare", the game's third boss

Out Zone is a science fiction-themed vertically scrolling run and gun game reminiscent of Commando and Ikari Warriors, where players assume the role of two cyborg mercenaries hired by the United Nations through seven increasingly difficult levels, each with a boss at the end that must be fought before progressing any further, in a last-ditch effort to overthrow an alien race from the planet Owagira from invading Earth as the main objective. Players fight enemies on foot, moving upward through the level, and are equipped with a number of bombs at the start, which obliterates any enemy caught in its blast radius, but player characters are not rendered invincible for any time period after using a bomb.

A unique gameplay feature is the weapon system; players are equipped with two main weapons at the beginning that can be upgraded by picking up to two "P" icons in a row and switch between them by picking up a "C" icon. The semi-automatic forward gun shoots forward no matter which way players move, but shoots three bullets in a slight spread each time the fire button is pressed, while the all-direction laser fires in the direction of movement, creating a sweep of bullets as the player character changes direction. The laser also shoots rapidly when tapping the fire button and each weapon is useful in certain situations, as players will often have to switch based on the enemy configuration. Other weapons appear on certain occasions as different colored "SP" icons to acquire, like a flamethrower and a rotating energy ball capable of piercing walls. Another gameplay feature is the energy bar; similar to Wonder Boy, players must remain aware of the energy bar, which constantly runs down at a steady pace and can only be refilled by collecting "E" icons scattered throughout the stage. The energy bar itself does not act as health, as players can still be killed with a single enemy shot. Various other "SP" items can also be picked up along the way such as 1UPs, a speed increaser, shield and an energy extender that increases the length of the energy meter.

The game hosts a number of hidden bonus secrets to be found, which is also crucial for reaching high-scores to obtain extra lives, as well as cameos of characters from other Toaplan games such as Flying Shark, Truxton and Zero Wing. The title uses a checkpoint system in which a downed single player will start off at the beginning of the checkpoint they managed to reach before dying. Getting hit by enemy fire, colliding against solid stage obstacles, falling off the stage or running out of energy will result in losing a life, as well as a penalty of decreasing the characters' firepower and speed to his original state and once all lives are lost, the game is over unless the players insert more credits into the arcade machine to continue playing. Although there is an ending, the game loops back to the first stage after completing the last stage as with previous titles from Toaplan, with each one increasing the difficulty and enemies fire denser bullet patterns.

== Synopsis ==
In an advanced space era, humanity encountered, traded and formed alliances with many alien races to ensure security. Humanity had been subject to past invasions from hostile outside forces but the alliances Earth forged granted victories in the past. In the year 2095, however, Earth had been subjected to an invasion launched by the alien military force from the planet Owagira, with overwhelmingly powerful and sophisticated weaponry than anything Earth's alliance could even try to counter. With the threat of annihilation looming over all of them, Earth's United Nations receive a message from an alien elder within their alliances about the existence of an ultra-elite mercenary unit codenamed "Out Zone" at a remote region of the Milky Way galaxy. Known as "Space Entrepreneurs" and renowned for their fighting skills by other alien alliances, Out Zone takes sides with no one and are willing to fight any wars for the proper price. Already under desperation and as a last-ditch effort to counterattack Owagira's military force, the UN requests Out Zone's services, guaranteeing the UN member nations' entire annual budget as a payment to them. With their negotiations complete, two very powerful cyborg mercenaries belonging to Out Zone volunteer for the mission. Having ties to Earth and realizing that their home world is in great peril, the two warriors rise up to save it from total utter doom and destroy the Owagira Forces.

== Development and release ==
Out Zone's soundtrack was composed by Tatsuya Uemura, who also created the sound effects while Naoki Ogiwara served as designer. Uemura recounted its development process and history in interviews, stating that it was difficult for him as he could not apply his experience from vertical-scrolling shooters with flying ships, as players controlled the game on-foot and could not design its progress. The project was fundamentally different due to the lack of forced scrolling, which did not require skills from vertical shoot 'em ups and players could move or stop freely. Uemura said that the intro was written during creation of the demonstration sequence, as the game's world was already established. The team integrated puzzle elements not found in ship-based shooters, which took time to plan out and Uemura said that the schedule for sound production was constantly being reduced, barely implementing the music during development. For the first stage's music, Uemura revealed in response to a user on Twitter that the main melody was originally composed based on Taiyō ni Hoero!. When composing music for the last stage, Uemura wanted to convey the sense of a "decisive battle". Uemura has since regarded the project as "the most difficult product he worked on".

Out Zone was released in arcades worldwide in August 1990 by Tecmo, Romstar and Toaplan. On October 21 of the same year, an album containing music from the title and Snow Bros. was co-published exclusively in Japan by Scitron and Pony Canyon, featuring an arranged song composed by Uemura. Unlike several other releases by Toaplan, the title remained exclusive to arcades and did not receive any official port to home consoles. By 2020, a new version of Out Zone by M2 was announced as part of their M2 ShotTriggers publishing label. It was first announced to be released on the Nintendo Switch. In December 2020, the game was made available on the iiRcade arcade console, marking its first appearance outside the arcades. The game was included in 2022 as part of the Sega Astro City Mini V, a vertically-oriented variant of the Sega Astro City mini console.

== Reception and legacy ==
Reception

Review scores
Publication	Score
Computer and Video Games	80%
Sinclair User	85%
Your Sinclair	84° / 100°
Zero	3/5

Out Zone received positive reception since its release, becoming a well regarded title from Toaplan in recent years. In Japan, Game Machine listed it on their August 15, 1990 issue as being the fifth most-popular arcade game at the time. In Australia, Leisure Line magazine reported the game to be the fifth most-popular Japanese coin-op game in their September 1990 issue. In the November 1990 issue of Japanese publication Micom BASIC Magazine, the game was ranked on the number fifteenth spot in popularity. Likewise, RePlay reported Out Zone to be the fourteenth most-popular arcade game at the time in North America. In May 1991, UK magazine Zero ranked it on their number nine spot in popularity.

Sinclair User praised the fast-paced gameplay and frenetic action, stating that "Outzone is one hell of a challenge, particularly past the initial stages, but is sure to set the pulse racing if you've got the reactions to match it!". Likewise, David Wilson of Your Sinclair praised the frenetic gameplay, although he drew comparison with Mercs. Retro Gamer's Mike Bevan gave positive remarks to the presentation but lamented the lack of a console release. Computer and Video Games's Julian Rignall scored the game with an overall 80% rating. Nick Zverloff of Hardcore Gaming 101 gave it an overall mixed retrospective. Similarly, Malcolm Laurie from SHMUPS! lamented the lack of a console port but praised the visuals, sound design, gameplay and multiplayer.

Out Zone was included as one of the titles in the 2010 book 1001 Video Games You Must Play Before You Die. A spiritual sequel, FixEight, was released in July 1992 for arcades. In more recent years, the rights to the game, its spiritual follow-up and many other IPs from Toaplan are now owned by Tatsujin, a company named after Truxton's Japanese title that was founded in 2017 by former Toaplan employee Masahiro Yuge, and is part of Embracer Group since 2022.
