= Pipi & Bibi's =

1991 eroge arcade game by Toaplan

- Developer: Toaplan (Note: Remaster developed by RAWRLAB Games.)
- Publishers: JP: Toaplan (Note: Remaster published by RAWRLAB Games.); EU: Nova Apparate GMBH & Co.; NA: Romstar
- Composer: Osamu Ōta (uncredited)
- Platform: Arcade
- Release: WW: 1991
- Genres: Action, eroge, platform
- Modes: Single-player, multiplayer

Pipi & Bibi's (Note: Also known as Whoopee!! (Japanese: フーピー！！, Hepburn: Fūpī!!) in Japan.) is a 1991 eroge action-platform arcade video game developed and published by Toaplan in Japan and in Europe by Nova Apparate GMBH & Co. It is notable for being one of the few titles by Toaplan that has not received any official port to home consoles as of date (prior to the remaster). In the game, players assume the role of Pipi and Bibi attempting to place time bombs in buildings filled with enemies who appear from behind closed doors and escape before the location collapses.

As of 2019, the rights to Pipi & Bibi's is owned by Tatsujin, a company founded in 2017 by former Toaplan member Masahiro Yuge. A remaster of the game was developed by RAWRLAB Games and was released in February 2023 for Microsoft Windows and Nintendo Switch.

== Gameplay ==
Gameplay screenshot

Pipi & Bibi's is an eroge action-platform game reminiscent of Elevator Action, where the players assume the role of Pipi (P1) and Bibi (P2) entering a series of six increasingly difficult buildings composed of four stages filled with enemies in order to set up time bombs on computer rooms and exit from the area before it collapses from the explosion as the main objective to reveal the picture of a woman. For each stage completed, 1/4 of a woman's picture is shown and the full picture is revealed once all four stages of a building are cleared. Getting hit by an enemy will result in losing a live and once all lives are lost, the game is over unless the players insert more credits into the arcade machine to continue playing.

Along the way, players can defend against enemies by shooting their laser beam weapon and depending how long the beam is held on, enemies will fall off to the platform below or out the playfield but they respawn from behind closed doors. Players traverse the stages through stairs and elevators, which can also be used by enemies as well. The player characters can also perform a sliding kick when the elevator door are opening or closing and this tactic can also be used to defeat enemies. On occasions, an "H" coin appears to be collected and depending on the number of coins collected before clearing all four stages, the woman on the picture takes more of her clothes. After setting up the time bombs, players only have twenty seconds to exit before the bombs detonate but if the players characters are hit by an enemy, the area collapses but players are forced to clear the stage once again.

== Development and release ==
Pipi & Bibi's was released on arcades worldwide by Toaplan and Nova Apparate GMBH & Co. in 1991. The game was showcased at the 1992 ACME trade show by Romstar and the 1992 AOU Show. The soundtrack was composed by Osamu Ōta, although he is not credited as such in the game. An album containing music from the title, as well as Snow Bros. and its sequel was published exclusively in Japan by City Connection under their Clarice Disk label in April 2018. A family friendly remaster of the game without the nude images, titled Spy Bros.: Pipi & Bibi's DX was released for Microsoft Windows and Nintendo Switch in February 2023, developed by RAWRLAB Games and licensed by Tatsujin, the owner of the former Toaplan intellectual properties.

== Reception and legacy ==
Reception

Review scores
Publication	Score
Game Zone	4/5
Zero	4/5

In Japan, Game Machine listed Pipi & Bibi's on their May 1, 1992 issue as being the ninthtenth most-popular arcade game at the time. Spanish gaming magazine Micromanía gave an overall mixed outlook to the game.

In more recent years, the rights to Pipi & Bibi's and many other IPs from Toaplan are now owned by Tatsujin, a company named after Truxton's Japanese title that was founded in 2017 by former Toaplan employee Masahiro Yuge, and is part of Embracer Group since 2022.
