= Snow Bros. 2: With New Elves =

1994 video game

- Developer: Toaplan
- Publisher: Hanafram
- Composer: Ryūichi Yabuki (uncredited)
- Series: Snow Bros.
- Platform: Arcade
- Release: WW: April 1994
- Genre: Platform
- Modes: Single-player, multiplayer

Snow Bros. 2: With New Elves (Note: Also known as Otenki Paradise: Snow Bros. 2 (Japanese: おてんきパラダイス・スノーブラザーズ２, Hepburn: Otenki Paradaisu - Sunō Burazāzu 2) in Japan) is a 1994 platform arcade video game developed and published by Toaplan under their Hanafram label. One of the last games to be created by Toaplan, it is the sequel to Snow Bros., which was released earlier in 1990 on multiple platforms. In the game, players assume the role of one of the playable characters to rescue a kidnapped princess from captivity.

As of 2019, the rights to the title is owned by Tatsujin, a company founded in 2017 by former Toaplan member Masahiro Yuge and now-affiliate of Japanese arcade manufacturer exA-Arcadia alongside many other Toaplan IPs.

== Gameplay ==
Gameplay screenshot

Like its predecessor, Snow Bros. 2: With New Elves is a platform game similar to Bubble Bobble where players must traverse through six increasingly difficult worlds composed of multiple stages, each with a boss at the end that must be fought before progressing any further to ultimately rescue the kidnapped princess as the main objective. Players fight enemies by throwing snow at them enemies until it is completely covered and turns into a snowball, while partially covered enemies in snow cannot move until it shakes it off. Once an enemy has been turned into a snowball, the player can roll it and rebound off of walls until eventually shattering against a wall, trapping any enemies on its way.

A new addition are three new playable characters, each with their own method of dispatching enemies from the playfield; the snowman Tom was omitted in the sequel. Another gameplay objective is to complete the words "EXTRA" at the bottom center by grabbing orbs left by defeated enemies that change between letters. Completing "EXTRA" gives the player an extra life and immediately advances to the next stage. As with the first entry, the game hosts a number of hidden bonus secrets to be found, which are crucial for reaching high-scores to obtain extra lives. If a single player is downed, their character is immediately respawned. Getting hit by enemy fire or colliding against solid stage obstacles will result in losing a life, as well as a penalty of decreasing the characters' firepower and speed to his original state. Once all lives are lost, the game is over unless the players insert more credits into the arcade machine to continue playing.

== Development and release ==
Snow Bros. 2: With New Elves served as one of the final projects to be developed by Toaplan, as the company ceased development of shoot 'em up games prior to their closure. The soundtrack was composed by Ryūichi Yabuki, although neither are credited as such in the game. According to Junya Inoue, the project was developed by then-freshman members at Toaplan.

Snow Bros. 2: With New Elves was released in arcades in April 1994 under Toaplan's then-newly formed Hanafram label, becoming one of their last games to be released before ceasing operations and declaring bankruptcy on March of the same year. According to Japanese website Institute of Game Culture Conservation, the game was distributed in low numbers. Prior to launch, the title was first showcased to the public in a playable state at the 1994 AOU Show. An album containing music from the title, as well as its predecessor's soundtrack was published exclusively in Japan by City Connection under their Clarice Disk label in April 2018.

== Legacy ==
In more recent years, the rights to Snow Bros. 2: With New Elves, its predecessor and many other IPs from Toaplan are now owned by Tatsujin, a company named after Truxton's Japanese title that was founded in 2017 by former Toaplan employee Masahiro Yuge, and is part of Embracer Group since 2022.

A remake of the game titled Snow Bros. 2 Special was developed by CRT Games and released on PC and Nintendo Switch in October 2024.

A third installment in the Snow Bros. series, Snow Bros. Wonderland, was released in November 2024 for PlayStation 4, PlayStation 5 and Nintendo Switch. The game was developed by Tatsujin and published by Clear River Games.
