= Truxton II =

1992 video game

- Arcade flyer
- Developer: Toaplan
- Publisher: Toaplan
- Artists: Naoki Ogiwara; Tomonobu Kagawa
- Composer: Masahiro Yuge
- Series: Truxton
- Platforms: Arcade, FM Towns
- Release: Arcade: JP/EU: June 1992; FM Towns: JP: April 1993
- Genre: Scrolling shooter
- Modes: Single-player, multiplayer

Truxton II (Note: Also known as Tatsujin Oh (Japanese: 達人王(たつじんおう), Hepburn: Tatsujin Ō; lit. "Expert King" or "Master King") in Japan) is a 1992 vertically scrolling shooter video game developed and published by Toaplan for arcades. It is the sequel to Truxton, which was released in 1988 and later ported to various platforms.

Taking place after the events of the original game, players assume the role of two fighter pilots taking control of the HyperFighter space fighter crafts in an effort to overthrow the returning Gidans alien race led by Dogurava and free the galaxy from enslavement. Truxton II later received a conversion to the FM Towns by Ving and published exclusively in Japan in April 1993, featuring various changes from the original version.

Truxton II received positive reception from critics since its initial arcade launch and later on the FM Towns, garnering praise for the detailed presentation, graphics and sound design, though some criticized the length and noted it to be a standard shoot 'em up title. Nevertheless, it has since gained a cult following and as of 2019, the rights to the title are owned by Tatsujin, a company founded in 2017 by former Toaplan member Masahiro Yuge alongside many other Toaplan IPs.

== Gameplay ==
Arcade version screenshot

Truxton II is a science fiction-themed vertically scrolling shooter that plays similarly to its predecessor. Players assume the role of two pilots taking control of the HyperFighter space fighter crafts through six stages, each with a boss at the end, in a last-ditch effort to overthrow the returning Dogurava and his Gidan army as the main objective. Several changes were implemented in the sequel compared to its predecessor, such as an autofire mechanism.

There are three types of weapons in the game that can be acquired by destroying incoming carriers, ranging from red napalm bombs that act in a similar way to the red Bakuryu-housen-ka (Exploding Flower) shot from Robo Aleste, the blue homing laser from Truxton, and the wide-reaching salvos of green shots, which replace the red weapon from the original game and each weapon can be powered-up several times by collecting the respective color of each one. In addition, a set of two satellite "options" are activated after collecting any weapon type. There are only two types of collectible items; speed increasers for the ship and bombs capable of obliterating any enemy caught within their blast radius.

In some occasions, players can pick up a 1UP icon to increase their lives reserve. Similar to Dogyuun and Gun Frontier, the game hosts a number of hidden bonus secrets to be found, which is also crucial for reaching high scores to obtain extra lives. The title uses a checkpoint system in which a downed single player will start off at the beginning of the checkpoint they managed to reach before dying. Getting hit by enemy fire or colliding against solid stage obstacles will result in losing a life, as well as a penalty of decreasing the ship's firepower and speed to its original state and once all lives are lost, the game is over unless the players insert more credits to continue playing. As with previous shoot 'em ups from Toaplan, the game loops back to the first stage after completing the last stage and each loop increases in difficulty.

== Synopsis ==
Truxton II takes place after the defeat of Dogurava and his Gidan army in the original game, where volcanic eruptions have been occurring on a planet for some time, which ultimately culminated in an explosion that revealed the returning Dogurava from his previous defeat and the resurrection of the Gidan army as a result. Under a short time period, the Gidans quickly dominated the galaxy, while few surviving refugees were able to escape from their grasp to deliver news about the current situation to the astroport. Two fighter pilots taking control of the HyperFighter space fighter crafts are dispatched to counterattack the invaders and overthrow their dominance in the galaxy.

== Development and release ==
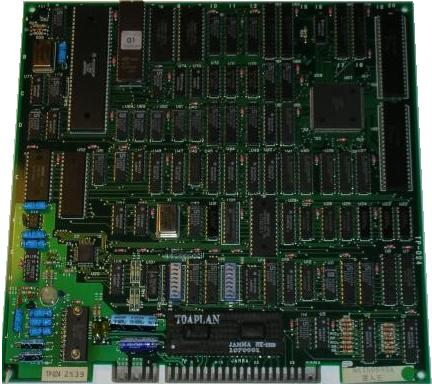
Truxton II arcade PCB

Truxton II marked the first time Toaplan made use of PCM for sound, although the company still made use of FM as well for the project. The soundtrack was composed by Masahiro Yuge and the team wanted to preserve Toaplan's musical style while challenging themselves with new ideas. Due to memory constrains, Yuge only used PCM for drums, prompting him to focus on FM sound instead. In 2020, former Taito designer Tomonobu Kagawa revealed on Twitter that he was involved during the game's development at Toaplan as graphic designer, as well as creating the HyperFighter ship. Kagawa stated that he was one of the three graphic designers responsible for the pixel art, among them being Naoki Ogiwara as lead artist, who later worked on DoDonPachi at Cave.

Truxton II was released for Japanese and European arcades in 1992. Prior to release, it was showcased to the public at events such as the 1992 AOU Show. On September 18, an album was co-published exclusively in Japan by Scitron and Pony Canyon, featuring an arranged song composed by Yuge. The title later received a faithful conversion to the FM Towns by Ving and was published exclusively in Japan in April 1993, but it features a cropped resolution and the parallax scrolling was removed. M2 included a new version of Truxton II as part of their M2 ShotTriggers publishing label. The game was announced for release on the Nintendo Switch. In 2022, the original arcade version was included as part of the Sega Astro City Mini V, a vertically oriented variant of the Sega Astro City mini console.

== Reception and legacy ==
Reception

Review scores
Publication	Score
Edge	(FM Towns) 8 / 10
GameFan	(FM Towns) 306 / 400

In Japan, Game Machine listed Truxton II as the sixth most popular arcade game of July 1992. In the September 1992 issue of Japanese publication Micom BASIC Magazine, the game was ranked on the number five spot in terms of popularity.

Truxton II has been met with positive critical reception from reviewers since its initial release in arcades and later on the FM Towns. Andreas Knauf of German magazine Video Games praised the elaborated and detailed presentation, regarding it to be better than Vimana, although Knauf criticized its length. The four reviewers of GameFan praised the FM Towns port for the presentation, graphics and sound, regarding it to be better than the Sega Genesis version of Truxton but some ultimately noted it to be a standard shoot 'em up title. Edge magazine gave the FM Towns port high praise as well but also slight criticism for the use of infinite continues. Damien McFerran of Retro Gamer regarded the FM Towns port as one of the system's "perfect three" games. Kurt Kalata of Hardcore Gaming 101 gave a positive outlook to the game in a retrospective review, praising the detailed presentation and graphics.

Truxton II has since gained a cult following, being cited as an inspiration for Cho Ren Sha 68K, while the rights to the game and many other IPs from Toaplan are now owned by Tatsujin, a company named after its predecessor's Japanese title that was founded in 2017 by Yuge, and is part of Embracer Group since 2022.

A sequel to Truxton II, named Truxton Extreme, was released on July 30th, 2026 for Windows, PlayStation 4, Xbox Series X/S, and Switch 2.
