= Flying Shark =

1987 video game

- Japanese arcade flyer
- Developer: Toaplan
- Publishers: JP: Taito; NA: Romstar; EU: Electrocoin
- Composers: Masahiro Yuge; Tatsuya Uemura
- Series: Shark
- Platforms: Arcade, Amiga, Amstrad CPC, Atari ST, Commodore 64, FM Towns, MS-DOS, NES, X68000, ZX Spectrum
- Release: JP: March 14, 1987; WW: March 1987
- Genre: Scrolling shooter
- Modes: Single-player; multiplayer

Flying Shark, (Note: Known as Hi Sho Zame (Japanese: 飛翔鮫(ひしょうざめ), Hepburn: Hishōzame; lit. "Flying Shark") in Japan.) known as Sky Shark in North America, is a vertically scrolling shooter arcade video game originally developed by Toaplan and published in 1987 by Taito in Japan, Romstar in North America and Electrocoin in Europe. Controlling the titular biplane, the players must fight endless waves of military vehicles while avoiding collision with their projectiles and other obstacles. The plane has a powerful bomb at its disposal that can clear a portion of the screen of bullets and damage enemies when fired. It was the third shoot 'em up game from Toaplan, and their eighth video game overall.

Flying Shark was ported to multiple systems, each version created by different third-party developers. The game proved to be a success for Toaplan among players in Japanese arcades and garnered mostly positive reception from western critics, but the game was met with mixed response from magazines, specifically the home conversions. In 1989 the sequel Fire Shark was released. The rights to the title are owned by Tatsujin, a Japanese company formed by Masahiro Yuge.

== Gameplay ==
Arcade screenshot

Flying Shark is a military-themed vertically scrolling shoot 'em up game in which players take control of the titular biplane through five increasingly difficult levels in order to defeat an assortment of military enemy forces like tanks, battleships, airplanes and artillery as the main objective. The title initially appears to be very standard, as players control their plane over a constantly scrolling background and the scenery never stops moving until a runway is reached. Players have only two weapons at their disposal: the standard shot that travels a max distance of the screen's height and three bombs.

The bombs are powerful weapons capable of obliterating any enemy caught within its blast radius. Various items are scattered through every stage that appear by destroying certain enemies: Shooting down colored waves of enemy planes spawn items like "S" power-up icons, point bonuses and extra lives. Certain enemies on the ground spawn "B" icons that increases the player's bomb stock when destroyed. Every time the player lands at a runway beyond the first takeoff, the amount of bombs multiply 3000 points to the player's total score.

Players are given three lives initially and bonus lives are awarded at 50000 points and thereafter. The game employs a checkpoint system in which a downed single player will start off at the beginning of the checkpoint they managed to reach before dying. Getting hit by enemy fire will result in losing a live, as well as a penalty of decreasing the plane's firepower to his original state and once all lives are lost, the game is over unless players insert more credits into the arcade machine to continue playing. Completing the last stage restarts the game with the second loop increasing in difficulty.

== Development ==
Flying Shark's creation process and history was recounted through various Japanese publications by composers Masahiro Yuge and Tatsuya Uemura, both of which collaborated with the soundtrack and marked the first time Toaplan made use of FM synthesis. Yuge stated that the basic structure for the game was already decided during development of Slap Fight by pursuing the excitement of shooting and dodging, settling on the bomb and shot system, claiming that firing a bomb relieved stress from players. Yuge also stated the theme for the title was a realistic depiction of war that would involve players emotionally, as the development team had the atmosphere portrayed by the 1979 epic war film Apocalypse Now in their mind. The team also took a company trip to Thailand and wanted to convey the mood of the country's scenery with the backgrounds, with Yuge stating that the decision of scrolling said backgrounds left and right was to immerse players more with the game's world, though he expressed desire in making stages longer.

Flying Shark was also the first project by Toaplan to make use of the Motorola 68000 microprocessor and due to the improved hardware, it allowed the team with displaying more sprites on-screen, but the increased hardware also brought issues such as difficulties with making FM sounds and enemy planes aiming their shots at players more accurately. The team wanted to make a title where players could clear it via tricks and knowledge accumulated through gameplay. When asked about the increasing bullet speed and starting at the second stage during higher loops, Uemura claimed that this design choice was made due to the first stage being made for beginning players and that the bullet speed would return to normal after reaching an overflow. Despite being published by Taito, Uemura stated that the publisher allowed them to reveal the project was made by Toaplan.

== Release ==
Flying Shark was first released by Taito in Japan on March 14, 1987. It was then released across arcades worldwide the same month, by Romstar in North America under the name Sky Shark and by Electrocoin in Europe. In November 1988, an album containing music from the title was co-published exclusively in Japan by Scitron and Pony Canyon.

Flying Shark was converted to multiple platforms by various third-party developers including the Commodore 64 (1987), ZX Spectrum (1987), Amiga (1988), Amstrad CPC (1988), Atari ST (1988), Nintendo Entertainment System (1989), MS-DOS (1989), X68000 (1991) and the FM Towns (1993). Most of the microcomputer ports were only released in Europe or North America. Two versions were developed for the Commodore 64; one in Europe and another in North America. The NES version, which was a North American exclusive, is notable for being one of the earliest soundtracks composed by Tim Follin on the system. The arcade version of the game was included in the Hishou Same! Same! Same! compilation for Nintendo Switch and PlayStation 4 as part of M2's Toaplan Arcade Garage label. Flying Shark was included as part of the Toaplan Arcade 1 compilation for Evercade.

== Reception ==
Reception
Review scores
Publication	Scores						
Publication	ARC	C64	ZXS	AGA	CPC	ST	NES
ACE	—N/a	735/1000	893/1000	895/1000	784/1000	895/1000	—N/a
ASM	—N/a	1/12	—N/a	—N/a	—N/a	—N/a	—N/a
AllGame	—N/a	—N/a	—N/a	—N/a	—N/a	—N/a	3.5 stars
AmAction	—N/a	—N/a	—N/a	—N/a	73%	—N/a	—N/a
ACPC	—N/a	—N/a	—N/a	—N/a	65%	—N/a	—N/a
Am-Mag	—N/a	—N/a	—N/a	—N/a	2 stars	—N/a	—N/a
CDU	—N/a	5 stars	—N/a	—N/a	—N/a	—N/a	—N/a
CForce	—N/a	50%	—N/a	—N/a	—N/a	—N/a	—N/a
CU	9/10	7/10	—N/a	—N/a	—N/a	—N/a	—N/a
CU Amiga-64	—N/a	—N/a	—N/a	73%	—N/a	—N/a	—N/a
CVG	Positive	6/10	8/10	—N/a	—N/a	75%	—N/a
Crash	—N/a	—N/a	85%	—N/a	—N/a	—N/a	—N/a
Dator	—N/a	—N/a	—N/a	2/10	—N/a	—N/a	—N/a
EGM	—N/a	—N/a	—N/a	—N/a	—N/a	—N/a	22/40
TGM	—N/a	74%	83%	72%	80%	84%	—N/a
Gén 4	—N/a	—N/a	—N/a	80%	—N/a	80%	—N/a
Happy CPU	—N/a	72/100	—N/a	—N/a	—N/a	—N/a	—N/a
MicroHobby	—N/a	—N/a	8/10	—N/a	—N/a	—N/a	—N/a
NP	—N/a	—N/a	—N/a	—N/a	—N/a	—N/a	14/20
The One	—N/a	—N/a	—N/a	—N/a	—N/a	76%	—N/a
Power Play	—N/a	7/10	—N/a	—N/a	5/10	—N/a	—N/a
Sinclair User	Positive	—N/a	10/10	—N/a	—N/a	—N/a	—N/a
Tilt	—N/a	13/20	—N/a	14/20	10/20	14/20	—N/a
Your Sinclair	—N/a	—N/a	9/10	—N/a	—N/a	—N/a	—N/a
Zzap!64	—N/a	63%	—N/a	68%	—N/a	—N/a	—N/a
Awards
Publication(s)				Award(s)			
ACE (1988)				Top 100 Games (C64/ZXS/CPC)			

According to Tatsuya Uemura, Flying Shark proved to be more popular than Twin Cobra and was "the biggest" hit for Toaplan. In Japan, Game Machine listed it on their April 15, 1987 issue as being the fourth most-popular arcade game of the month. It went on to become Japans's second highest-grossing table arcade game of 1987 (below Arkanoid) and fourth highest-grossing arcade conversion kit of 1988.

Commodore User's Nick Kelly gave the coin-op a 9 out of 10 score. Computer and Video Games's Clare Edgeley gave an overall positive outlook to the arcade original. Sinclair User's Tim Rolf stated that "it is difficult, but Taito has made it so awesomely playable that the difficulty is a real joy". In contrast, Teresa Maughan gave a more mixed outlook to the arcade version. Edge magazine praised the gameplay, visuals and music, claiming that "Toaplan arguably perfected the vertical shoot 'em up with this early effort", though the publication lamented it never received a proper conversion. In a 2010 interview, composer Manabu Namiki regarded Flying Shark as one of the shoot 'em up games he enjoys the most.

Yaegaki Nachi of Japanese magazine Oh!X gave the X68000 conversion a positive review. German magazine MAN!AC gave the FM Towns Marty port a 47% score.

== Legacy ==
A sequel, titled Fire Shark (known in Japan as Same! Same! Same!) was launched in 1989. Its main character, Schneider, later re-appears in Batsugun. In more recent years, the rights to Flying Shark, its successor and many other IPs from Toaplan are now owned by Tatsujin, a company named after Truxton's Japanese title that was founded in 2017 by former Toaplan employee Masahiro Yuge, and is part of Embracer Group since 2022.
