= Tiger-Heli =

1985 video game

- Developer: Toaplan (Note: Ported to Nintendo Entertainment System by Micronics, and Atari 7800 by Plaion.)
- Publishers: Arcade: JP: Taito; NA: Romstar; NES: JP: Pony Inc.; NA/EU: Acclaim; Atari (7800)
- Programmers: Masahiro Yuge; Tatsuya Uemura; Yuichirō Nozawa
- Composers: Masahiro Yuge; Tatsuya Uemura
- Series: Tiger
- Platforms: Arcade, NES, Atari 7800
- Release: Arcade: JP/NA: October 1985; NES: JP: December 5, 1986; NA: September 1987; EU: July 1988; SCN: January 17, 1990; 7800: WW: July 18, 2025
- Genre: Vertically scrolling shooter
- Modes: Single-player, multiplayer

Tiger-Heli (Note: Japanese: タイガー・ヘリ, Hepburn: Taigā-Heri) is a vertically scrolling shooter developed by Toaplan and released as an arcade video game in 1985 in Japan by Taito and North America by Romstar. A version for the Nintendo Entertainment System (NES) was published in 1986. It is the first entry in the Tiger series and the first shoot 'em up from Toaplan. The player controls the Tiger attack helicopter fighting against enemies. The helicopter is equipped with missiles that can hit targets and bombs that destroy any enemy and their bullets within range.

Tiger-Heli was programmed by Masahiro Yuge, Tatsuya Uemura, and Yuichirō Nozawa. Their previous work, Performan, was not as successful as the team had hoped. They revisited Vastar (1983) and decided their next project would be a shooter, drawing inspiration from Gyrodine. The staff wanted to create a game that balanced between being stressful and exciting, and to have players keep wanting to play it after dying. The team chose a helicopter as the player's craft as they deemed it suitable for a slow scrolling shooter on a cocktail cabinet. The soundtrack, composed by Yuge and Uemura, was made to convey a sense of bravery, but was hampered by technical limitations.

Tiger-Heli was a hit that helped establish Toaplan as a leading producer of shooter games during the 1980s and 1990s. The game's introduction of the bomb concept would also become Toaplan's hallmark and a staple of the shoot 'em up genre. The NES version sold over a million copies in North America, but received a mixed reception from critics. It was followed by Twin Cobra (1987). The rights to Tiger-Heli are owned by Tatsujin, a Japanese developer and licensee formed by Yuge. In 2025, an officially licensed version was released for the Atari 7800.

== Gameplay ==
The Tiger helicopter taking down an enemy tank (arcade version shown)

Tiger-Heli is a vertically scrolling shooter game. The player controls the Tiger attack helicopter, fighting against air and ground enemies such as tanks, gunboats, artillery, and aircraft. Other targets include buildings, level crossings, cars, fuel depots, tents, and mine carts. The helicopter is equipped with two weapons: short-range missiles and bombs. The missiles can hit both air and ground targets. The bombs can destroy any enemy and their bullets within range when fired. If enemy bullets hit a bomb carried by the helicopter, it will detonate automatically. The game employs a scoring system; the player's score increases as targets are destroyed. Destroying ground targets also allows the player to discover secrets that provide bonus points.

There are three items the player can obtain by shooting cross-shaped bunkers that alternate between green, red, and gray: extra bombs and two small helicopter gunners. Shooting a bunker when it is green will spawn a "B" icon and the player will be able to re-equip the helicopter with up to two bombs upon pickup. Shooting a bunker when it is red or gray will summon smaller helicopters to join the player's formation on the left or right side, providing additional firepower support. Red ones fire laterally, while gray ones fire forward. The player can recruit up to two units and combine both variants. If the player picks up any item when not needed, it will only award bonus points.

The game consists of four stages where the player flies through various terrains. After completing a stage, the player arrives at a helipad and receives bonus points for carrying bombs or small helicopters. The player is given three lives, and additional lives are awarded upon reaching certain score thresholds or destroying ten diamond-shaped blocks. The player is sent back to a checkpoint if they die and the game is over once all lives are lost. In the NES version, the player can resume from the last stage reached using a hidden continue option. After the final stage, the game loops to the second stage with a higher difficulty.

== Development ==
Tiger-Heli was the first shoot 'em up developed by Toaplan. It was programmed by Masahiro Yuge, Tatsuya Uemura, and Yuichirō Nozawa. Yuge, Uemura and Nozawa had worked for the Japanese companies Orca and Crux, before both went bankrupt and they joined Toaplan. Nozawa had previously created the shooter Gyrodine, while Yuge and Uemura had worked on the action game Performan, their first game at Toaplan. Performan was not as successful as the team had hoped, so they stepped back and revisited Vastar (1983), a shooter they previously made at Orca and which had performed well. They decided their next project would be a shooter, under the working title Cobra (Note: コブラ (Kobura)).

The staff wanted a game that balanced stressful and exciting sections. The idea of playing as a helicopter was influenced by Gyrodine, as it was considered suitable for a shooter where the screen was scrolling due to it being a slower craft and able to hover midair. Yuge explained that another reason was that the team wanted to make it easier for beginners to see the bullets by reducing their speed, and that increasing the craft's speed would make route planning in each stage less strategic. They also felt the helicopter theme was more fitting, as the game was developed with a cocktail cabinet in mind, which would have the player seated, using a joystick, looking down at the screen. The bomb system emerged when the staff questioned how to make the game more fun and was added to provide players with an aggressive weapon to vent their frustration on enemies.

The team also sought a game that would encourage players to replay it after dying and continue immersed in its world. From the outset, they assumed that levels would have to be loaded into memory one by one, but the new read-only memory (ROM) chips available on the game's arcade board made running one seamless world possible. Since the hardware had low specifications, the team forced it to run the game as they desired. When creating the graphics, described as "polygonal", Toaplan was conducting research for a flight simulator they could develop themselves, and one of the designers implemented a sample image from that program into the game. The staff used tricks such as high-speed sprite flickering, as the board could not handle transparency of an object's shadow. They also wanted to make the bomb graphics more detailed, but were hampered by hardware limitations. According to Uemura, production was funded by the team's own funds, as publisher Taito was solely focused on distribution and Toaplan's name could not appear in the game due to contractual agreements.

=== Music ===
The music for Tiger-Heli was scored by Yuge and Uemura. When composing the songs, Uemura attempted to convey a sense of bravery, but he was limited by technical and memory limitations at the time. A CD album containing the game's soundtrack titled Kyukyoku Tiger -G.S.M. Taito 2- was distributed in Japan by Scitron and Pony Canyon on November 21, 1988. In 2011, the soundtrack was included on Toaplan Shooting Chronicle, a six-CD compilation album distributed by SuperSweep. In 2018, the soundtrack was also included as part of the eighth volume of the Toaplan Arcade Sound Digital Collection, an 11-volume series released under City Connection's Clarice Disk label.

== Release ==
Tiger-Heli was first tested at a game center in Meguro. The game was released for arcades by Taito in Japan and Romstar in North America in October 1985. It was ported to the Nintendo Entertainment System (NES) by Micronics and released by Pony Inc. in Japan on December 5, 1986. In North America, Taito decided not to release the game, but Nintendo planned to publish it as Helifighter under its "Action Series" label. Acclaim took over Western publishing instead, releasing the game in North America in September 1987, followed by Western Europe in July 1988 and Scandinavia on January 17, 1990. Computer Entertainer wrote that it was released in North America in November 1987. The game was also distributed in South Korea by Hyundai Electronics. In 1996, it was included in the Toaplan Shooting Battle 1 compilation, developed by Gazelle and published by Banpresto in Japan for the PlayStation.

In 2021, the arcade and NES versions were included in the Kyukyoku Tiger-Heli: Toaplan Arcade Garage collection, developed and released by M2 initially in Japan for the PlayStation 4 and Nintendo Switch as part of its ShotTriggers line. In 2023, Limited Run Games announced the physical release of the collection in the west. M2 later released it in North America in 2024 via the PlayStation Store and Nintendo eShop. In 2026, Clear River Games will release the collection digitally in Europe, with a physical release also planned. In 2022, Tiger-Heli was included in the Toaplan Arcade 1 compilation released by Blaze Entertainment for the Evercade. In 2024, the game was included as part of Toaplan Arcade Shoot 'Em Up Collection Vol. 3, released by Bitwave Games for PC via Steam and GOG.com. That same year, it was included as a demo and as a purchasable title in the Amusement Arcade Toaplan app, released for iOS via the App Store and for Android via Google Play. In February 2025, the arcade version was included as part of the Polymega Collection Vol. 3 - Tiger-Heli compilation for the Polymega. The game was also included in the Toaplan Arcade Collection Vol. 1, released in August 2025 by City Connection in Japan and by Clear River Games in the west for the PlayStation 4, Switch, Xbox One, PlayStation 5, and Xbox Series X and Series S.

Atari released a version for the Atari 7800 on July 18, 2025. The port arose during a meeting on the AtariAge forums between Ben Jones, director of retro business at Plaion, and Bruno Steux, director and founder of SandCastle. After discussions on the forums, they agreed to adapt Tiger-Heli to the 7800 with approval from Tatsujin, the current intellectual property owner. The 7800 version is distinguished by its music, reworked by Maxime Steux, Bruno's son, who used a tracker for the POKEY chip, in addition to the Television Interface Adapter (TIA).

== Reception ==
According to Masahiro Yuge, Tiger-Heli generated a lot of income during its location test in Meguro and was a big hit. In Japan, Game Machine listed it in their October 1, 1985 issue as being the most-popular arcade game for the previous two weeks. Micom BASIC Magazine considered Tiger-Heli a monumental work, but noted that its gameplay was slow and lacked balance. Haoh magazine enjoyed the thrill of dodging enemy bullets in the game, but felt the bombs were not useful due to their limited range. AllGame's Anthony Baize found the game fun and its graphics ahead of their time, but faulted the limited range of bombs and lack of power-ups.

Retrospective commentary for Tiger-Heli has been mixed. Hardcore Gaming 101's Nick Zverloff wrote that "Tiger-Heli is a little rough in retrospect, but it's also about on par with other shooters from 1985". In a 2021 review of Kyukyoku Tiger-Heli, Nintendo Life's Will Freeman called the game a classic of its time, but felt that it has not aged well compared to its contemporaries. Likewise, M! Games' Thomas Nickel found it archaic due to its simple graphics and short length. In 2024, Paste ranked it as the thirteenth best Toaplan shoot 'em up.

Reviewing the Atari 7800 version, Retro Gamer's Nick Thorpe called it an excellent conversion, stating that it faithfully recreated the gameplay and level design of the arcade original. Similarly, Time Extension's Damien McFerran considered the 7800 version an impressive technical achievement and found its gameplay to be close to that of the arcade original.

=== NES ===
Reception (NES)

Review scores
| Publication | Score |
|---|---|
| Aktueller Software Markt | 8/12 |
| Computer Gaming World | Positive |
| Computer and Video Games | 65% |
| Official Nintendo Magazine | 65% |
| Tilt | 12/20 |
| Beep | 3/4 |
| Computer Entertainer | 3.5/4, 3/4 |
| Joystick (DE) | 6/10 |
| Micro News | 4/5 |
| Power Play | 53% |

The NES version of Tiger-Heli sold over one million copies in North America by 1989, making it one of the best-selling NES games. The port received mixed reviews from critics. The initial Japanese and North American releases received a favorable reception from reviewers, but later European releases received a more average reception from reviewers. The Famicom version received a 15.55/30 score in a 1991 Japanese readers' poll conducted by Family Computer Magazine.

Computer Gaming World's Bill Kunkel thought the NES version was excellent and praised its graphics, but found it difficult to determine the altitude of the helicopter and easy to accidentally deploy a bomb while firing. Micro News' Patrick Gallo considered it a compelling adaptation that faithfully replicated the arcade original. Computer Entertainer felt that the maneuverability of the helicopter and ferocity of the enemy attack made Tiger-Heli interesting. They also commended the game's graphics and sound. In their "Complete Guide To Consoles", Computer and Video Games remarked that it was faithful to the arcade, but found the audiovisual presentation dull and noted that the limited play area made it difficult to dodge enemy fire in later stages. Nintendo Magazine System (Official Nintendo Magazine) wrote that the game was a rather simple shoot 'em up and criticized its repetitive graphics, bland sound, and average gameplay.

Aktueller Software Markt's Torsten Oppermann found the NES conversion to be good, but criticized technical issues such as flickering sprites and poor sound. Writing for the German publication Joystick, Robin Goldmann gave positive remarks on the game's audiovisual department, stating that while Tiger-Heli may not be one of the most difficult shooters on the NES, it was still fun. Tilt's Jean-Philippe Delalandre highlighted the game's colorful graphics, but noted the slow movement of the helicopter. Power Play's Henrik Fisch faulted the game for its poorly drawn environments, flickering enemies, and repetitive gameplay.

== Legacy ==
The success of Tiger-Heli helped establish Toaplan as a leading developer of shooters during the 1980s and 1990s, which would continue to characterize its output. The game also introduced the concept of the bomb, a mechanic that Toaplan would continue to develop in later games, becoming its hallmark and a staple of the shoot 'em up genre.

As printed circuit boards (PCBs) slowly advanced, a sequel to Tiger-Heli was conceived out of a desire to remove the stress induced by its predecessor, offering a fun and deep experience for players as its core concept. Twin Cobra (Note: Known in Japan as Kyukyoku Tiger (究極タイガー, Kyūkyoku Taigā; lit. 'Ultimate Tiger')) was released for arcades in 1987 and was ported to the NES, PC Engine, Sega Mega Drive/Genesis, X68000, and FM Towns. In 1994, Toaplan declared bankruptcy, but Masahiro Yuge and some of the staff transferred to Takumi Corporation. Takumi acquired the Twin Cobra trademark and developed a sequel, Twin Cobra II (Note: Known in Japan as Kyukyoku Tiger II (究極タイガーII, Kyūkyoku Taigā II; lit. 'Ultimate Tiger II')), released for the Taito F3 System in 1995. In 1997, Naxat Soft released the game for the Sega Saturn under the name Kyukyoku Tiger II Plus (Note: 究極タイガー IIプラス (Kyūkyoku Taigā II Purasu)), featuring a remixed soundtrack and an exclusive stage. It is the final installment in the Tiger series.

The Tiger helicopter is playable in Slap Fight Tiger, an adapted version of Slap Fight, as part of the Taito Nostalgia 2 plug and play game console in the Let's! TV Play Classic series. The rights to Tiger-Heli are currently owned by Tatsujin, a Japanese video game developer and licensee founded in 2017 by Yuge. In 2022, Tatsujin was acquired by Embracer Group for a retro gaming focused operative group. In 2023, a demo of an Amiga port, developed by Ben "Acidbottle" Brown using the Scorpion engine by Erik "Earok" Hogan, was released online.
