= Demon's World =

1989 video game

- Japanese arcade flyer
- Developer: Toaplan
- Publishers: JP: Taito; NA: Catalina Games
- Artist: Atsushi Kawaguchi
- Composers: Osamu Ōta; Toshiaki Tomizawa
- Platforms: Arcade, PC Engine Super CD-ROM²
- Release: Arcade: WW: July 1989; Super CD-ROM²: JP: 26 February 1993
- Genre: Run and gun
- Modes: Single-player, multiplayer

Demon's World (Note: Also known as Horror Story (Japanese: ホラーストーリー, Hepburn: Horā Sutōrī) in Japan) is a 1989 run and gun arcade video game originally developed by Toaplan and published in Japan by Taito and in North America by Catalina Games. In the game, players assume the role of two ghost hunters to fight against several ghosts and monsters that were unleashed upon Earth by the titular demon king. Initially launched for the arcades, the title was then ported to the PC Engine Super CD-ROM² by NEC Avenue and published exclusively in Japan on 26 February 1993, featuring various additions and changes compared with the original release.

Demon's World was met with mixed response from critics, who reviewed the PC Engine Super CD-ROM² version as an import title despite being exclusive to Japan. As of 2019, the rights to the title is owned by Tatsujin, a company founded in 2017 by former Toaplan member Masahiro Yuge, and now-affiliate of Japanese arcade manufacturer exA-Arcadia alongside many other Toaplan IPs.

== Gameplay ==
Arcade version screenshot

Demon's World is a horror-themed horizontally-scrolling run and gun game where players assume the role of two ghost hunters through ten increasingly difficult linear autoscrolling stages across various locations, some of which have a boss at the end that must be fought before progressing any further in an effort to defeat several ghosts and monsters that were unleashed upon Earth by the titular demon king as the main objective.

The player characters are armed with a gun complete with energy pack reminiscent to the Ghostbusters franchise to shoot various ghosts and monsters that infest each stage, though players can also defeat enemies by jumping on them, in addition to performing a double jump to move across platforms as well. Along the way, players can collect multiple a weapon power-up to change their gun to fire lasers, bombs or a spread shot. Other items can also be collected during gameplay such as "P" icons that, after collecting three icons in a row, grants the players a shield that takes an extra enemy hit and heart icons that give points. Firing on determined locations is crucial to reach high-scores and get extra lives, as certain setpieces in some stages hosts bonus secrets.

While the better known version of the arcade game started in a relatively modern town at a telephone booth and continues to advance to the haunted American Old West themed levels, an alternative arcade version and the home console version for the PC Engine shuffle these levels around: There the opening stages of the title take place in an eastern setting, starting in the fantasyland of China and moving on to Japan, featuring various spirits and creatures of Japanese folklore. Some of these include ghostly karakasa, chochinobake, kappa, hitotsume-kozou and rokurokubi. The game then changes course, moving to a ghostly pirate ship and then the haunted American Old West, featuring a ghost town and a canyon inhabited by traditional ghosts and monsters from western culture such as Frankenstein's monster, Dracula, and even Jason Voorhees-style masked monsters.

In all variants of the game, the final stretch takes place in a medieval setting, complete with cursed castles and dungeons infested with haunted armor, goblins and dragons. But the PC Engine version and the less known alternative arcade revision add a cave segment between the last dragon and the final boss. Thus, both of these versions share a similar amount of content, but the PC engine version adds an additional mid-boss to the western town segment (a cowboy skeleton that throws scorpions).

Demon's World uses a checkpoint in which a downed single player will start off at the beginning of the checkpoint they managed to reach before dying. Getting hit by enemy fire, colliding against certain stage obstacles, falling off the stage or running against any enemy will result in losing a life and once all lives are lost, the game is over unless the players insert more credits into the arcade machine to continue playing. Although there is an ending, the game loops back to the first stage after completing the last stage as with previous titles from Toaplan, with each one increasing the difficulty.

== Development and release ==
Demon's World was released on arcades worldwide in 1989 by Taito in Japan as Horror Story, Catalina Games in North America and Toaplan across other regions. The soundtrack was co-composed by Osamu Ōta and Toshiaki Tomizawa, while artist Atsushi Kawaguchi was responsible for the artwork. The arcade board is multi-regional, meaning that it can be configured for different regions via the DIP switches and these settings change the legal warnings, display the Taito licensing message and can change the title between the English version and the Japanese version. In 2018, an album containing music from the title and other Toaplan games was published exclusively in Japan by City Connection under their Clarice Disk label. On 26 February 1993, Demon's World was ported to the PC Engine Super CD-ROM² by NEC Avenue under its original Japanese title (Horror Story) and published exclusively in Japan, featuring an arranged soundtrack using Redbook CD Audio. It is built on the later alternative arcade board revision along with its new stage and features a new "cowboy skeleton" mid-boss that is exclusive to this version, among other changes.

== Reception and legacy ==
Reception

Review scores
Publication	Score
Consoles +	80%
GameFan	80%, 79%, 72%, 68%
Mega Fun	45%
Video Games (DE)	43%
Dengeki PC Engine	45/100, 50/100, 55/100, 45/100
Hippon Super!	6/10

In Japan, Game Machine listed Demon's World as the 22nd most popular arcade game of August 1989.

Demon's World has been met with mixed critical reception since its PC Engine Super CD-ROM² release as Horror Story from critics who reviewed it as an import title. French magazine Consoles + praised the graphics, music and gameplay but noted the presentation to be the conversion's main negative point. Markus Appel of German magazine Mega Fun gave mixed remarks to the graphics and sound. Likewise, both Andreas Knauf and Martin Gaksch from German magazine Video Games gave this port a mixed outlook. Den of Geek noted it to be a solid but forgettable title from Toaplan.

In more recent years, the rights to the game and many other IPs from Toaplan are now owned by Tatsujin, a company named after Truxton's Japanese title that was founded in 2017 by former Toaplan employee Masahiro Yuge, and is part of Embracer Group since 2022.
