= Slap Fight =

1986 video game

- Arcade flyer
- Developer: Toaplan
- Publisher: Taito
- Composer: Masahiro Yuge
- Platforms: Arcade, Amstrad CPC, Atari ST, Commodore 64, ZX Spectrum, Thomson MO5, Thomson TO8, Mega Drive
- Release: July 1986: Arcade; JP: July 1986; NA: September 1986; EU: 1986 C64, CPC, ZX Spectrum; UK: 1987 Atari ST; UK: 1988; NA: March 1989 Mega Drive; JP: 11 June 1993
- Genre: Scrolling shooter
- Modes: Single-player, multiplayer

Slap Fight, (Note: Japanese: スラップファイト, Hepburn: Surappu Faito) also known as Alcon in North America, is a 1986 vertically scrolling shooter developed by Toaplan and published by Taito. Initially an arcade video game, it was ported to home systems by third-party developers. Set on the colonized fictional planet of Theron in the future, where an alien race led by Gaudy have invaded the human-controlled location, players assume the role of an Allied League of Cosmic Nations (ALCON) fighter pilot taking control of the SW475 space fighter craft in an effort to counterattack the invaders.

Slap Fight proved to be popular with arcade players despite a low number of arcade boards manufactured in Japan, but was met with mixed reception from video game magazines across western regions, specifically the home conversions. Although it never received a direct sequel, the game's ideas and weapon system were later inherited by both Truxton and Grind Stormer, with the latter being regarded as its spiritual successor. The rights to the title are owned by Tatsujin, a Japanese company formed by Masahiro Yuge.

== Gameplay ==
Arcade version screenshot

Slap Fight is a science fiction-themed vertically scrolling shoot 'em up game reminiscent of B-Wings, where players assume the role of an Allied League of Cosmic Nations (ALCON) fighter pilot taking control of the SW475 space fighter craft in a counterattack effort to defeat an invading alien race led by Gaudy on planet Theron as the main objective. Besides some stationary helicopters with blades spinning, there are no flying enemies in the entire game. As far as vertical scrolling shooters go, the title initially appears to be very standard, as players control their craft over a constantly scrolling background and the scenery never stops moving until a boss at the end that must be fought before progressing any further is reached. By default and without power ups, players have only a standard shot that travels a max distance of half the screen's height.

The game's weapon power-up system takes inspiration from Gradius; certain enemies spawn a star-shaped item upon destruction to be collected, activating an upgrade menu at the bottom of the screen that moves a lit cursor through the list of weapon power-ups described below. Activating any weapon power-up (apart from the side-shot), however, increases the ship's hitbox, making it a bigger target for enemy fire and difficult to keep successive lives in the heat of battle. If any power-up is lit but the player's ship is destroyed before a power-up could be selected, the star item is "carried over" and the speed power-up is lit on the next life. A number of hidden bonus secrets to be found are hosted, which is also crucial for reaching high-scores to obtain extra lives, as firing on determined locations and certain setpieces within the scenery in some stages reveals a bonus secret.

Major weapons affect the enemies and terrain differently. For example, certain enemy towers can only be destroyed with laser or homing missile shots; other enemies are destroyed much faster with specific weapons to match. If bomb or homing missile shots are equipped, certain bonus targets will appear or parts of the landscape may be destroyed to reveal bonuses. If laser is active, certain plants in the landscape can be shot repeatedly to grow and earn extra points until they scroll off-screen. A cheat enabled the player to obtain all power-ups by allowing themselves to be killed by an enemy before firing a shot. Upon restarting the level, the player would have all power ups.

The game employs a checkpoint system in which a downed single player will start off at the beginning of the checkpoint they managed to reach before dying. Getting hit by enemy fire will result in losing a life, as well as a penalty of decreasing the ship's firepower to its original state and once all lives are lost, the game is over unless the player inserts more credits into the arcade machine to continue playing. After completing the last stage, the game begins again with the second loop increasing in difficulty and enemies fire denser bullet patterns. The title does not support continues with extra credits and is believed to loop endlessly.

== Plot ==
The plot of Slap Fight varies between each region and version. The game takes place in the year 2059 on another galaxy, mankind has colonized an alien planet called Theon after evacuating a previously colonized planet Orac. Five years ago, the colony on Orac was attacked by alien invaders and the war was so intense that the colonists were forced to leave. Theon is now under attack by the same alien fleet, but the humans are ready. The player assumes the role of an Allied League of Cosmic Nations (ALCON) fighter pilot in the SW475 space fighter craft to stop the invaders from taking over Theon.

== Development ==
Most of the artwork were hand-drawn sketches created by the development team before being transposed to pixel art graphics.

Slap Fight's development team had a concept for a game that featured secrets, while its main appeal was to keep players investing in long play sessions that revolved around hidden items and the weapon power-up system, as then-Toaplan composer Masahiro Yuge stated that the team's idea for the game was to add as many secrets as they could such as an alien that resembled one from Space Invaders, which they included as an homage to Taito, with Yuge citing his affinity for titles with hidden secrets and characters. Slap Fight was also one of the earliest projects Toaplan made using game design documents, though Yuge claimed that these were added after development as postscripts, since the team "needed some written records".

Yuge stated that the weapon change mechanism was intended to be a strategic element in Slap Fight, as the player's ship is rendered invincible. The weapon power-up system was implemented early during the creation process, since the development team wanted to make "that kind of game", while each of the weapons' functionality and roles were decided to be good for certain sections in the title. All of the secrets were planned from the beginning of development and the team kept adding to the idea during the creation process such as secrets that required certain weapons. Another secret, the ship's satellite "option", was an idea suggested by Osamu "Lee" Ōta as a way to give the second player on a cocktail cabinet a purpose.

== Ports ==
The ports we did in-house at Toaplan I oversaw completely, but with the ones we licensed out, it was pretty much "do what you like".

— Former Toaplan composer Tatsuya Uemura gave Slap Fight MD its raison d'être when responding about the conversion's soundtrack by Yuzo Koshiro.

The Mega Drive conversion titled Slap Fight MD was developed by M.N.M Software, a Japanese game development company founded by former Dempa Micomsoft member Mikito Ichikawa. Ichikawa met then-Toaplan composer Tatsuya Uemura at the home of late Bubble Bobble designer Fukio Mitsuji, exchanging business cards before Ichikawa found the offices of Toaplan two weeks later. Being a fan of Twin Cobra, Ichikawa wanted to make a console port, but Uemura told him the game was already being converted by another team. Uemura then asked if Ichikawa could port Slap Fight instead, which surprised Ichikawa, as the arcade original displayed Taito's logo. He accepted the offer since he was a big fan of the arcade version.

Slap Fight MD, which was created under subcontract from Toaplan, was developed concurrently over the course of one year alongside four other projects at M.N.M Software, including Streets of Rage 2 and an unreleased Mega Drive conversion of Dash Yarō, affecting both development of the port and Ichikawa's health greatly due to increasing overtime to the point of working at home on his personal computer while his health condition deteriorated, prompting him with including version information in the project during development as a result. Uemura served as producer, while programmer Jun Shimizu did the coding process entirely by himself and also served as level designer. Streets of Rage composer Yuzo Koshiro was recruited by Ichikawa to score the music due to his experience with M.N.M, while voicework was done by a friend of Koshiro serving at a US military base. Ichikawa arranged the original arcade music and claimed that M.N.M originally did not have plans to arrange the arcade's music, but Uemura requested it and after positive feedback from him, led Ichikawa to committing to the task. Toaplan also provided reference materials used during development of the arcade original to the team at M.N.M. The cover art was drawn by Parsley Promotion.

The special mode in Slap Fight MD was developed by M.N.M due to the fact that their conversion would have not featured as much content if they had followed Toaplan's basic contract of just porting the straight arcade version of Slap Fight to the Mega Drive. Ichikawa stated that the special mode was conceived as the "ultimate version" and featured a wider range of strategic play, as the team felt the original arcade release did not offer as many gameplay strategies and depth. Both Toaplan and M.N.M wanted the port to be catered towards casual and hardcore players.

== Release ==
The "Slap Fight MD" mode of the Mega Drive version

Slap Fight was first released in Japanese arcades in July 1986, followed by North America in September of the same year, as well as in Europe by Taito. Commercial ports of the game were released across European and North American markets for the Amstrad CPC, Atari ST, Commodore 64, Thomson MO5, Thomson TO8 and ZX Spectrum. Almost all microcomputer versions of the game would later be re-released as budget titles by The Hit Squad.

A Mega Drive conversion titled Slap Fight MD was published in Japan by Tengen on 11 June 1993 and in South Korea by Samsung in the same year. Tengen produced an estimated run of 5,000 copies for the Mega Drive port. Slap Fight MD itself is a new special game mode with new levels, graphics, weapons and music, plus a new "bomb" feature at the cost of wing power-ups and new music composed and arranged by Yuzo Koshiro, which is presented on the title screen. The original game was also included, but with changes such as configuration for the shield's timer and an in-game announcer. It was later included on the Japanese version of the Sega Genesis Mini in 2019.

In Taito Nostalgia 2 for the Let's! TV Play Classic plug and play game series by Bandai, the original Japanese version and a new version titled Slap Fight Tiger were included. In this version, players control the titular attack helicopter from Tiger-Heli instead of the SW475, while the laser is changed to fire a three-way spread shot and new enemies such as the aliens from Space Invaders are introduced. Slap Fight was included as part of the Toaplan Arcade 1 compilation for Evercade.

== Reception ==
Reception
Review scores
Publication	Scores					
Publication	CPC	C64	Thomson	ZXS	ST	SMD
ACE	—N/a	—N/a	—N/a	—N/a	568/1000	—N/a
ASM	—N/a	10/12	—N/a	—N/a	—N/a	—N/a
Amstar	12/20	—N/a	—N/a	—N/a	—N/a	—N/a
Amstrad Action	76% 69%	—N/a	—N/a	—N/a	—N/a	—N/a
Arcades	—N/a	—N/a	—N/a	—N/a	15/20	—N/a
Atari ST User	—N/a	—N/a	—N/a	—N/a	5/10	—N/a
Beep! Mega Drive	—N/a	—N/a	—N/a	—N/a	—N/a	29/40
Commodore Force	—N/a	60% 76%	—N/a	—N/a	—N/a	—N/a
CU	—N/a	5/10	—N/a	—N/a	—N/a	—N/a
CVG	—N/a	10/10; 81%	—N/a	60%	4/10	—N/a
Crash	—N/a	—N/a	—N/a	72% 41%	—N/a	—N/a
Famitsu	—N/a	—N/a	—N/a	—N/a	—N/a	26/40
The Games Machine	—N/a	—N/a	—N/a	—N/a	75%	—N/a
Happy Computer	—N/a	80/100	—N/a	—N/a	—N/a	—N/a
Mean Machines Sega	—N/a	—N/a	—N/a	—N/a	—N/a	76/100
MegaTech	—N/a	—N/a	—N/a	—N/a	—N/a	83%
PlayStation Magazine (JP)	—N/a	—N/a	—N/a	—N/a	—N/a	19.8/30
Power Play	—N/a	—N/a	—N/a	—N/a	70%	—N/a
Sinclair User	—N/a	—N/a	—N/a	7/10; 89%	—N/a	—N/a
ST Action	—N/a	—N/a	—N/a	—N/a	61%	—N/a
Super Game	—N/a	—N/a	—N/a	—N/a	—N/a	90/100
Tilt	—N/a	15/20; 15/20	13/20	—N/a	14/20	—N/a
Your Sinclair	—N/a	—N/a	—N/a	9/10; 82°/100°	—N/a	—N/a
Zzap!64	—N/a	80% 60%	—N/a	—N/a	—N/a	—N/a

According to Tatsuya Uemura, not many arcade boards were produced for Slap Fight in Japan, but the game nonetheless proved to be popular among players. Japanese magazine Game Machine listed it as the seventh most successful table arcade unit of August 1986, outperforming titles such as Ikari Warriors and Gradius. Den of Geek noted its weapon system and multiple ways to kill enemies.

== Legacy ==
According to Masahiro Yuge, some of the ideas implemented in Slap Fight would later go on to influence development of Truxton. A spiritual successor, Grind Stormer (1993), uses a weapon power-up system reminiscent of Slap Fight. In more recent years, the rights to the game and many other IPs from Toaplan are now owned by Tatsujin, a company named after Truxton's Japanese title that was founded in 2017 by Yuge, and is part of Embracer Group since 2022.
