= Vimana (video game) =

1991 video game

- Developer: Toaplan
- Publishers: JP: Tecmo; EU: Toaplan
- Designer: Yuichirō Nozawa
- Composer: Toshiaki Tomizawa
- Platform: Arcade
- Release: WW: June 1991
- Genre: Vertically scrolling shooter
- Modes: Single-player, multiplayer

Vimana (Note: Japanese: ヴィマナ, Hepburn: Vu~imana) is a vertically scrolling shooter arcade video game developed by Toaplan and published in Japan by Tecmo and Europe in June 1991. It is notable for its unique combination of science fiction with brief Hindu references. In the game, players assume the role of the titular warriors taking control of powerful ancient space fighter crafts in order to reclaim their home planet by fighting against military machines gone wild. The title received positive reception from critics and reviewers alike after release in regards to the gameplay, but was considered a flop in arcades. As of 2019, its rights are owned by Tatsujin, a company founded in 2017 by former Toaplan member Masahiro Yuge and now-affiliate of Japanese arcade manufacturer exA-Arcadia alongside many other Toaplan IPs.

== Gameplay ==
Gameplay screenshot

Vimana is a science fiction-themed vertically scrolling shoot 'em up game where players assume the role of the two titular warriors taking control of powerful ancient space fighter crafts in order to reclaim their planet by fighting against an unknown force as the main objective. Players control their ship over a constantly scrolling background; the scenery never stops moving until the final level is reached. Players have three weapons at their disposal: the standard shot, a charge shot and a bomb weapon.

The standard shot weapon is a twin-shot weapon capable of strengthening in size and power with upgrades, but the players have to tap the fire button to fire rapidly; once the button is held down, the ship charges a stronger version of the normal shot capable of spreading out across the entire screen in twelve directions. A unique gameplay feature is the bomb itself; The Circle Bomb surrounds the ship once activated and seeks out enemies upon an additional tap of the bomb button.

There are four items for the players to pick up: One increases player's shot strength, one increases their bomb stock, one would grant the player various points and the other would grant the player a 1UP. Extends are awarded with every 70,000 points. The game hosts a number of hidden bonus secrets to be found, which is crucial for reaching high-scores to obtain extra lives. Getting hit by enemy fire or colliding against solid stage obstacles will result in losing a live and once all lives are lost, the game is over unless the players insert more credits into the arcade machine to continue playing. Although there is an ending, the game loops back to the first stage after completing the last stage as with previous titles from Toaplan, with each loop increasing the difficulty by enemies being more durable, firing denser and faster bullet patterns and Circle Bomb icons appearing less frequently.

== Synopsis ==
Vimana takes place in the titular planet. Once a lush and prosperous planet, it had been ravaged by a devastating war. After the war the planet had been fragmented, automated machines of war now populate the planet's pieces. The war forced its surviving people to flee their mother planet entirely, but the exiled space colonists are still accosted by their victors who continually remove parts of the planet's surface still containing life force for use as flying fortresses. The inhabitants plot to reclaim their planet with the aid of the Vimana Warriors: pilots capable of handling ancient but powerful space fighter ships.

After fighting strings of relentless battles on fragmented pieces of Vimana planet, liberating them from wicked machines and their 'governors' in the process, the Vimana Warriors flew towards the final fortress where the master of Vimana planet's war machines resided in the deepest section of the fortress. Diving ever deeper into the subterranean sectors of the fortress, the Vimana Warriors fought their ways and finally met the master head-on. Tough as the master was, it was no match for the Vimana Warriors and was eradicated.

Although the Vimana Warriors were victorious, planet Vimana was also annihilated and reduced to dust. All its industries, resources and cultures no longer existed. The surviving inhabitants of the destroyed planet including the Vimana Warriors, had no choice but to search for another habitable planet. Fortunately for them, they eventually managed to find such a planet and worked hard to rebuild their civilization. Over time, the survivors thrived in their new home planet and became prosperous once more. Terrible memories of the war that doomed Vimana planet faded, and people no longer cared to remember the heroism of Vimana Warriors. The ending narration says that the planet retained the memory of this legend.

== Development and release ==
Vimana was released in arcades worldwide in May 1991 by Tecmo and Toaplan. The soundtrack was written by Zero Wing composer Toshiaki Tomizawa. In September 1991, an album containing music from the title and Teki Paki was co-published exclusively in Japan by Scitron and Pony Canyon, featuring an arranged song from the former composed by Tomizawa.

=== Home Console Releases ===
Vimana was included in the Toaplan Arcade 3 collection for Evercade on November 11, 2024.

Vimana was released for more home consoles including the Nintendo Switch, PlayStation 4, PlayStation 5, and Xbox, on August 14, 2025, as part of the Toaplan Arcade Collection Vol. 2. It was ported by Bitwave Games and distributed by Clear River Games.

=== Cultural references ===
Vimana carries a few significant cultural references into its presentation, specifically from Hindu culture and Sanskrit epics. The Vimanas are described in various Hindu texts such as the Ramayana as flying chariots and sometimes temples. Early in the game's opening, the take-off sequence features the Vimana ships being energized by two statues resembling the Hindu god Ganesha.

== Reception and legacy ==
Reception

Review scores
Publication	Score
AllGame	3/5
Game Zone	3.5/5
Zero	3.5/5

In Japan, Game Machine listed Vimana on their July 15, 1991 issue as being the thirteenth most-successful table arcade unit of the month, outperforming titles such as Tecmo World Cup '90 and Burning Fight. In the September 1991 issue of Japanese publication Micom BASIC Magazine, the game was ranked on the number nine spot in popularity. Vimana was met with positive reception from critics and reviewers alike since its release. David Wilson of British gaming magazine Game Zone gave the game a positive outlook. Anthony Baize of AllGame praised the weapon set, accessibility and gameplay, but felt mixed in regards to the graphics and sound. Likewise, Nick Zverloff of Hardcore Gaming 101 gave positive remarks to the weapon set and level design. Despite the reception, the title turned to be a failure in arcades for Toaplan.

In more recent years, the rights to the game and many other IPs from Toaplan are now owned by Tatsujin, a company named after Truxton's Japanese title that was founded in 2017 by former Toaplan employee Masahiro Yuge, and is part of Embracer Group since 2022.
