= Performan =

- Developer: Toaplan
- Publisher: Data East
- Designer: Kenichi Takano
- Programmer: Masahiro Yuge
- Composers: Masahiro Yuge; Tatsuya Uemura
- Platform: Arcade
- Release: JP: April 1985
- Genre: Action
- Modes: Single-player, multiplayer

Performan (Note: Japanese: パフォーマン, Hepburn: Pafōman) is an action arcade video game developed by Toaplan and published exclusively in Japan by Data East in April 1985. In the game, players assume the role of the titular robot in order to defeat enemies across multiple stages. The title is notable for being created by most of the same team that previously worked on several projects at Orca and Crux before both companies declared bankruptcy. A group of employees from the two gaming divisions would go on to form Toaplan as a result. Performan is one of the few titles by Toaplan that has not received any official port to home consoles.

== Gameplay ==
Gameplay screenshot

Up to two players control a Performan from a top-down perspective. The main objective on each screen is to eliminate enemies in order to progress further, while an intermission animation plays between some stages. Getting hit by an enemy will result in losing a life and once all lives are lost, the game ends unless the players insert more credits into the arcade machine.

The player controls a robot with a four-way joystick and two buttons to attack and dig. Players can dive into the ground to avoid enemies that can also perform the same action to chase the player's character. Players can also attack enemies by throwing boomerangs, which can trigger the "meca-stones" placed on the playfield to explode and eliminate any enemy caught within its blast radius. Players can also trigger the meca-stones under the ground to eliminate enemies as well. Players can be paralyzed if the robot is caught with its blast radius. Meca-stones can also be pushed against enemies.

After exploding a meca-stone, a gift item is spawned and after picking up the last gift before completing a stage, a "P" icon appears at the center of the playfield that turns into a colored ball. Collecting four colored balls in a row grants an extra life. After blowing up a meca-stone with enemies nearby, a ghost appears and after catching it, the players turn invincible for a brief time period.

Eliminating many enemies at once with an exploding meca-stone grants a determined number of points, which is crucial for achieving high scores.

== Development and release ==
Performan was created by most of the same team that previously worked on several projects at Orca and Crux before both companies declared bankruptcy, after which a group of employees from the two gaming divisions would go on to form Toaplan and among them were composers Masahiro Yuge and Tatsuya Uemura, both of which recounted the project's development process and history between 1990 and 2012 through Japanese publications such as Gamest and Shooting Gameside. Both Yuge and Uemura stated that the game was designed by Kenichi Takano and that their development environment at the time of the title's creation was done in the bedroom of an apartment. Uemura worked on the sound design for the game while he still formed part of Crux developing Repulse, but Yuge later assumed the sound design duties after Uemura had a motorcycle accident during development, in addition to programming as well. Performan was released only in arcades across Japan by Data East in April 1985. Uemura stated that the reason why the company was not credited for the title was due to contractual arrangements with Data East.

== Reception ==
In Japan, Game Machine listed Performan on their 1 June 1985 issue as being the twenty-second most-popular arcade game at the time. Hardcore Gaming 101's Nick Zverloff gave positive remarks to the game in regards to the graphics, music and gameplay but criticized several aspects. Den of Geek's Ryan Lambie noted it to be a "fairly low-key" title from Toaplan.
