= Teki Paki =

1991 video game

- Developer: Toaplan
- Publishers: JP: Tecmo; HK: Honest Trading Co.; TW: Spacy Co. Ltd
- Composer: Tomoaki Takanohashi
- Platform: Arcade
- Release: WW: April 1991
- Genre: Puzzle
- Modes: Single-player, multiplayer

Teki Paki (Note: Also known as Brainwashing Game Teki Paki (Japanese: 洗脳ゲーム テキ・パキ, Hepburn: Sennō Gēmu Teki Paki) in Japan) is a 1991 puzzle arcade video game developed by Toaplan and published in Japan by Tecmo, Hong Kong by Honest Trading Co. and Taiwan by Spacy Co. Ltd.

In Teki Paki, players compete for the highest score by stacking block pieces and making them disappear with a chain reaction by connecting them together. Home console conversions of the game, as well as a sequel for arcades were planned and under development, but neither project were ultimately released to the public for unknown reasons. As of 2019, the rights to the title is owned by Tatsujin, a company founded in 2017 by former Toaplan member Masahiro Yuge and now-affiliate of Japanese arcade manufacturer exA-Arcadia alongside many other Toaplan IPs.

== Gameplay ==
Gameplay screenshot

Teki Paki is a falling block puzzle game reminiscent of Puyo Puyo and Tetris, where the players' objective is to compete for the highest possible score by stacking up incoming block pieces that fall from the top of the playfield as a group of three, while avoiding to completely fill the screen with block pieces but failing to do so after they are unable to enter and fill the screen results in a game over, unless players insert more credits into the arcade machine to continue playing.

During gameplay, three square blocks of random colors (red, blue, green, yellow, orange, purple, silver and gold) are dropped and these blocks can be arranged either vertically, horizontally or diagonally to make them disappear after five or more blocks are connected, while more blocks can be added before disappearing. By dropping the block pieces on top of another group placed in the playfield, one of the pieces is unlocked and players can maneuver this sole piece to fill spaces and aim for a chain erase.

When five block pieces are connected, the game enters a new level and each one causes the block pieces to fall faster, with the highest level being 999. There are also two additional special blocks that appear on random occasions; the "Smiley" blocks connects with all the blocks on-screen and the "Bakudan" dynamite that erases all the blocks as well, in addition of granting a 100000-point bonus if players are successful in connecting five of them. The game hosts a number of hidden bonus secrets to be found, which is also crucial for reaching high-scores.

== Development and release ==
Teki Paki's development process and history have been recounted between 2011 and 2012 by former Toaplan composers Masahiro Yuge and Tatsuya Uemura through Japanese publications such as Shooting Gameside. Uemura stated that the project was made "as a puzzle game with the intensity of shooting games". Yuge said that Tomoaki Takanohashi was originally recruited for sound design but he was initially instructed with learning about programming and although Takanohashi disliked this part of his assignment, he served as one of the project's programmers. Takanohashi was also responsible for writing the soundtrack and after listening to his work, Yuge realized that his talents would diminish if he continued programming and the company let Takanohashi focus on the sound instead later during development.

Teki Paki was released in arcades worldwide in April 1991 by Tecmo, Honest Trading Co. and Spacy Co. Ltd. The game was first playable during a location test in Japan prior to release and showcased various differences compared to the final version such as the Smiley block piece being a sphere instead of its final form, with Yuge claiming that this early incarnation of the aforementioned block piece was a placeholder and the team already decided to change it before release. Uemura said that the title proved to the popular at the company, with one employee in particular playing it constantly. In September 1991, an album containing music from the title and Vimana was co-published exclusively in Japan by Scitron and Pony Canyon, featuring an arranged song from the latter composed by Toshiaki Tomizawa.

A Sega Mega Drive conversion of Teki Paki was announced to be under development by Toaplan and previewed in late 1992 through multiple screenshots on video game magazines such as Beep! MegaDrive, but the conversion was never released for unknown reasons and the only remaining proofs of its existence besides screenshots are a promotional flyer as well as a promotional recording featuring the only known gameplay footage of this version. In 2021, the game was included in the Kyukyoku Tiger-Heli compilation for Nintendo Switch and PlayStation 4 as part of M2's Toaplan Arcade Garage label, and as a free download for the physical versions, featuring several additions exclusive in the collection. Teki Paki was included as part of the Toaplan Arcade 1 compilation for Evercade.

== Reception and legacy ==
According to Tatsuya Uemura, Teki Paki did not sell well. Den of Geek noted it to be one of the titles from Toaplan in which the company pursued other game genres besides their shoot 'em up endeavors. A sequel, Teki Paki 2, was planned and under development but never released for arcades. The rights to the game and many other IPs from Toaplan are now owned by Tatsujin, a company named after Truxton's Japanese title that was founded in 2017 by Yuge, and is part of Embracer Group since 2022.
