= Toaplan =

Japanese video game developer

Toaplan Co., Ltd.
- Trade name: Toaplan
- Native name: 株式会社東亜プラン
- Romanized name: Kabushiki gaisha Tōapuran
- Type: Kabushiki gaisha
- Industry: Video games
- Founded: April 1979; 47 years ago
- Founder: Kiyoshi Motoyoshi
- Defunct: March 1994; 32 years ago
- Fate: Bankruptcy
- Headquarters: Shimizu, Suginami, Tokyo
- Area served: Japan
- Key people: Taizo Hayashi (president); Yoshiyuki Kiyomoto (CEO)
- Products: Video games

Toaplan Co., Ltd. (Note: Japanese: 株式会社東亜プラン, Hepburn: Kabushiki gaisha Tōapuran; lit. "East Asia Project") was a Japanese video game developer based in Tokyo. It was best known for its catalogue of scrolling shooters and other arcade video games. The company was founded in 1979 but its gaming division was established in 1984 by former Orca and Crux employees, who wanted to make games, after both companies declared bankruptcy. Their first shoot 'em up game, Tiger-Heli (1985) on arcades, was a success and helped establish Toaplan as a leading producer of shooting games throughout the 1980s and 1990s that would continue to characterize its output.

Though initially exclusive to arcades, it expanded with the Sega Genesis in 1990. The company ceased development of shoot 'em up projects before declaring bankruptcy in 1994. Several offshoot developers such as Eighting, Tamsoft, CAVE, Gazelle, and Takumi Corporation were formed prior to and after the closure, while former members later joined to other studios such as Bandai Namco Entertainment, Capcom, Square Enix and Taito. Toaplan has since earned recognition from critics, being called one of the greatest and most influential Japanese shoot 'em up developers and "master" of the scrolling shooter genre.

== History ==
Toaplan was established in April 1979 but its gaming division was established by former Orca and Crux members. Performan was created by most of the same team that previously worked on several projects at Orca and Crux before both companies declared bankruptcy, after which a group of employees from the two gaming divisions would go on to form Toaplan and among them were composers Masahiro Yuge and Tatsuya Uemura.

In 1992, Yoshiyuki Kiyomoto stepped down from his position as CEO at Toaplan, with Taizo Hayashi now serving as the company's president. Toaplan provided consultance and advising to Raizing (now Eighting) during the development of Sorcer Striker, as well as licensing their arcade board to the company, since the president of the latter company previously served as an employee of the former. Snow Bros. 2: With New Elves served as one of the final projects to be developed by Toaplan, as the company ceased development of shoot 'em up games before their closure.

The company declared bankruptcy on March 31, 1994. Its closure led to the formation of several offshoot companies. Prior to Toaplan's closure in 1994, several former employees formed or were involved with multiple companies, many of which were dedicated to arcade shooters: Eighting, Tamsoft, CAVE, Gazelle, and Takumi (who continued development of Twin Cobra II after Toaplan's closure).

The rights to nearly every Toaplan IP are currently owned by Tatsujin, a Japanese company formed by Yuge. In 2019, Japanese company M2 announced its plan to release every game by Toaplan (excluding Mahjong Sisters and Enma Daiō) for consoles in Japan, starting in 2020. In August 2022, Tatsujin was acquired by Embracer Group for a retro gaming focused operative group. In 2023, Tatsujin announced several new projects, such as Truxton Extreme, Snow Bros. Wonderland (both games being sequels to their respective series) and Amusement Arcade TOAPLAN, a compilation of 25 arcade games for smartphones. One of the titles from Tatsujin, Snow Bros. Wonderland, was released in 2024.

== Staff ==
Various individuals have been important figures in the history of Toaplan:

- Masahiro Yuge – One of the six original team members and frequent composer. Later worked at Takumi Corporation and Eighting on several projects.
- Tatsuya Uemura – One of the six original team members and frequent composer. Later worked at Gazelle and Eighting on several projects.
- Toshiaki Tomizawa – Music composer for Demon's World, Zero Wing and Vimana. Co-founder of CAVE.
- Osamu Ōta – Music composer for Wardner, Rally Bike and Twin Hawk. Producer of Gekirindan at Taito.
- Toshiaki Ōta – One of the six original team members and head of software development. Founder of Tamsoft.
- Naoki Ogiwara – Artist and designer for Truxton and Out Zone. Co-founder of CAVE.
- Kōetsu Iwabuchi – Artist for Guardian and Twin Cobra. Later served as planning manager for Grind Stormer.
- Yuko Tataka – Character designer for Truxton, Hellfire, Twin Hawk, Zero Wing and Fire Shark.
- Sanae Nitō – Character designer for Truxton, Hellfire, Twin Hawk, Zero Wing and Fire Shark.
- Tsuneki Ikeda – Programmer for Grind Stormer and Batsugun. Co-founder of CAVE.
- Satoshi Kōyama – Programmer for Batsugun. Later worked at CAVE on several projects.
- Junya Inoue – Designer for Dogyuun, Knuckle Bash and Batsugun. Later worked at Gazelle and CAVE on several projects.
- Yusuke Naora – Graphic designer for Grind Stormer. Later worked at Square Enix on several projects.
- Kenichi Takano – One of the six original team members and designer for Performan. Co-founder of CAVE.
- Yuichirō Nozawa – One of the six original team members and designer for Twin Hawk.
- Atsushi Kawaguchi – One of the six original team members and artist for Demon's World.
- Nanpei Kaneko – Designer for FixEight and Knuckle Bash. Later worked as illustrator for Japanese magazines.
- Tomonobu Kagawa – One of the three graphic artists for Truxton II. Later worked at Taito on several projects.

== Games ==
=== Developed ===
Year	Title	Original platform(s)	Publisher	Co-developer
1984	Jongō	Arcade	SNK	—N/a
1985	Performan	Arcade	Data East	—N/a
1985	Tiger-Heli	Arcade, Nintendo Entertainment System, Atari 7800	Taito, Romstar	Micronics (NES), Plaion (7800)
1985	Jongkyō	Arcade	Data East	—N/a
1986	Guardian	Arcade	Taito, Kitkorp	—N/a
1986	Slap Fight	Arcade, Amstrad CPC, Commodore 64, Thomson MO5, Thomson TO8, ZX Spectrum, Atari ST, Sega Mega Drive	Taito	Probe Software (CPC/ZXS), Imagine Software (C64), France Image Logiciel (MO5/TO8), Abersoft Limited (ST), M.N.M Software (SMD)
1986	Mahjong Sisters	Arcade	Toaplan	—N/a
1987	Flying Shark	Arcade, Commodore 64, ZX Spectrum, Amiga, Amstrad CPC, Atari ST, Nintendo Entertainment System, MS-DOS, X68000, FM Towns	Taito, Romstar, Electrocoin	Catalyst Coders (C64), Graftgold (ZXS/CPC), Images Software (AGA/ST), Software Creations (C64/NES), Banana Development Corporation (DOS), Kaneko (X68K), Ving (FMT)
1987	Wardner	Arcade, Famicom Disk System, Sega Genesis	Taito	Daiei Seisakusho (FDS), Dragnet (SG)
1987	Twin Cobra	Arcade, PC Engine, NES, Sega Genesis, X68000, FM Towns	Taito, Romstar	A.I Company (PCE), Micronics (NES), Graphic Research (SG), Inter State (X68K), Ving (FMT)
1988	Rally Bike	Arcade, Nintendo Entertainment System, X68000	Taito	Visco Corporation (NES), SPS (X68K)
1988	Truxton	Arcade, Sega Genesis, PC Engine	Taito, Midway	Sting Entertainment (PCE)
1989	Hellfire	Arcade, Sega Genesis, PC Engine Super CD-ROM²	Taito, U.S.A. Games	NCS Corporation (SG), NEC Avenue (PCE SCD-ROM²)
1989	Twin Hawk	Arcade, Sega Mega Drive, PC Engine, PC Engine CD-ROM²	Taito	Center Tech (PCE), NEC Avenue (PCE CD-ROM²)
1989	Demon's World	Arcade, PC Engine Super CD-ROM²	Taito, Catalina Games	NEC Avenue (PCE SCD-ROM²)
1989	Zero Wing	Arcade, Sega Mega Drive, PC Engine CD-ROM²	Namco, Williams Electronics	—N/a
1989	Fire Shark	Arcade, Sega Genesis	Toaplan, Romstar, Dooyong	—N/a
1990	Snow Bros.	Arcade, Game Boy, Nintendo Entertainment System, Sega Mega Drive	Toaplan, Romstar	Dual (GB), Soft House (NES)
1990	Out Zone	Arcade	Tecmo, Romstar, Toaplan	—N/a
1991	Teki Paki	Arcade	Tecmo, Honest Trading, Spacy	—N/a
1991	Vimana	Arcade	Tecmo, Toaplan	—N/a
1991	Ghox	Arcade	Taito	—N/a
1992	Pipi & Bibi's	Arcade	Toaplan, Nova Apparate	—N/a
1992	Truxton II	Arcade, FM Towns	Toaplan	Ving (FMT)
1992	FixEight	Arcade	Toaplan	—N/a
1992	Dogyuun	Arcade	Toaplan	—N/a
1993	Grind Stormer	Arcade, Sega Genesis	Toaplan	Tengen (SG)
1993	Knuckle Bash	Arcade	Toaplan, Atari Games	—N/a
1993	Enma Daiō	Arcade	Taito	—N/a
1993	Batsugun	Arcade, Sega Saturn	Toaplan, Taito, Unite Trading	Gazelle (SS)
1994	Snow Bros. 2: With New Elves	Arcade	Hanafram	—N/a

=== Published ===
Year	Title	Platform	Developer	Co-publisher	Ref.
1990	MUSHA	Sega Genesis	Compile	Seismic	
1991	Snow Bros.	Nintendo Entertainment System	Soft House	Capcom	

=== Cancelled ===
Title	Genre	Publisher(s)	Planned release date/Last year developed or mentioned	Notes/Reasons
Batsugun sequel	Shoot 'em up	Toaplan	1 May 2001	
Untitled Sega System 1 game	Action	Sega	1 June 2009	
Dynamic Trial 7	Racing, vehicular combat	Toaplan	1 June 2009	
Teki Paki 2	Puzzle	—N/a	1 June 2009	
Genkai Chōsen Distopia	Action, hack and slash, platform	—N/a	1 June 2009	
Tank da Don!!	Platform, run and gun	—N/a	27 October 2011	
