= Enma Daiō =

1993 video game

- Developer(s): Toaplan
- Publisher(s): Taito
- Producer(s): Masahiro Yuge
- Platform(s): Arcade
- Release: JP: November 1993
- Genre(s): Quiz
- Mode(s): Single-player

Enma Daiō (Note: Japanese: えんま大王, lit. "King of Hell") is a 1993 hybrid quiz/lie detector arcade video game developed by Toaplan and published exclusively in Japan by Taito. In the game, players answer a number of question. As of 2019, the rights to the title is owned by Tatsujin, a company founded in 2017 by former Toaplan member Masahiro Yuge and now-affiliate of Japanese arcade manufacturer exA-Arcadia alongside many other Toaplan IPs.

== Gameplay ==
Gameplay screenshot

Enma Daiō is a hybrid quiz/lie detector game where players must answer a series of random questions given by the in-game character. Depending on the question selected and the player's state, the titular deity either stays calm or becomes angry.

== Development and release ==
Enma Daiō proved to be the most expensive project developed by Toaplan, as former Toaplan composer Tatsuya Uemura stated in a 2009 interview with Japanese publication Floor 25 that it "cost a lot of money". Uemura later revealed in November 2020 that Truxton composer Masahiro Yuge was involved during the game's development at Toaplan as producer. The title was distributed exclusively in Japan by Taito in 1993 on two variations; a standard upright variant and a deluxe variant. The title was also showcased to attendees at the 1993 Amusement Machine Show and later at the 1994 AOU Show.

== Legacy ==
In more recent years, the rights to Enma Daiō and many other IPs from Toaplan are now owned by Tatsujin, a company named after Truxton's Japanese title that was founded in 2017 by former Toaplan employee Masahiro Yuge, who are now affiliated with arcade manufacturer exA-Arcadia. In 2019, M2 acquired the license to nearly all titles developed by Toaplan for re-release on modern platforms in the future, but Enma Daiō was excluded for multiple reasons.
