= Mahjong Sisters =

1986 video game

- Developer: Toaplan
- Publisher: Toaplan
- Programmer: Tatsuya Uemura
- Composer: Osamu Ōta
- Platform: Arcade
- Release: JP: 1986
- Genres: Board, eroge
- Modes: Single-player, multiplayer

Mahjong Sisters (Note: Japanese: 麻雀シスターズ, Hepburn: Mājan Shisutāzu) is a 1986 eroge mahjong arcade video game developed and published exclusively in Japan by Toaplan. In the game, the players face off against a group of three sisters in a series of mahjong matches. As of 2019, the rights to the title is owned by Tatsujin, a company founded in 2017 by former Toaplan member Masahiro Yuge and now-affiliate of Japanese arcade manufacturer exA-Arcadia alongside many other Toaplan IPs.

== Gameplay ==
Gameplay screenshot

Mahjong Sisters is a tile-based japanese mahjong eroge game where players compete against three sisters with the main objective of winning the matches by getting the girls undressed. As far as gameplay goes, the game plays like other mahjong titles released at the time, as the goal of players is to take points from other players by drawing and discarding tiles until a winning hand is made.

The player can choose between one of the three selectable girls at the beginning to start a match: Sayuri, Yukari and Megumi. During gameplay, players needs to claim mahjongs in order to get the girls with taking off their clothes. Failing to do so results in the girls putting a piece of their clothing back on. By meeting certain conditions such as obtaining a tenpai, the players also have the option of stripping the girls.

The game is over once the players has zero points or less in their favor, unless more credits are inserted into the arcade machine to continue playing.

== Development and release ==
Mahjong Sisters was released only in arcades across Japan by Toaplan in 1986. According to former Toaplan composer Tatsuya Uemura in a 2009 interview with Japanese publication Floor 25, the code was based on the company's previous mahjong releases: Jongō and Jongkyō. Osamu Ōta was responsible for the audio design, although he is not credited as such in the title. In August 2018, an album containing its audio, as well as from other Toaplan titles was published exclusively in Japan by City Connection under their Clarice Disk label.

== Legacy ==
In more recent years, the rights to Mahjong Sisters and many other IPs from Toaplan are now owned by Tatsujin, a company named after Truxton's Japanese title that was founded in 2017 by former Toaplan employee Masahiro Yuge, who are now affiliated with arcade manufacturer exA-Arcadia. In 2019, M2 acquired the license to nearly all titles developed by Toaplan for re-release on modern platforms in the future, but Mahjong Sisters was excluded for multiple reasons.
