= Blast radius =

Distance from the source affected by an explosion

A physical blast radius is the distance from the source that will be affected when an explosion occurs. A blast radius is often associated with bombs, mines, explosive projectiles (propelled grenades), and other weapons with an explosive charge. The term also has usages in computer programming.

== Uses in software ==
=== Cloud computing ===
In cloud computing, the term blast radius is used to designate the impact that a security breach of one single component of an application could have on the overall composite application. Reducing the blast radius of any component is a security good practice. The concept is used in zero trust security model and chaos engineering.

=== Maintenance ===
An alternate usage of the term relates to technical debt, where it refers generally to how many otherwise redundant edits on different scripts would need to be made when changing something small. In this way, blast radius is also closely connected to magic numbers, such as if a specific float is constantly being used across many scripts without being assigned to a variable it may take a long time to find all instances of the number to change all to the new desired amount.

== See also ==
- Overpressure
