= Japan Amusement Expo =

Annual trade fair for amusement arcade products

Japan Amusement Expo ジャパン アミューズメント エキスポ
- Status: Active
- Genre: Trade exhibition
- Frequency: Annual
- Venue: Makuhari Messe
- Location: Greater Tokyo Area
- Country: Japan
- Inaugurated: 2012
- Website: www.jaepo.jp

The Japan Amusement Expo (JAEPO) is an annual trade fair for amusement arcade products, such as arcade games, redemption games, amusement rides, vending machines, and change machines. The event is hosted one weekend per year in the Greater Tokyo Area. The event is held at the Makuhari Messe convention center in Chiba.

JAEPO is one of the largest amusement-machine trade fairs in the world. It is organised by the combined efforts of the Japan Amusement Machine and Marketing Association (JAMMA) and the Amusement Machine Operators' Union (AOU). Before 2012, these organisations each produced separate trade fairs in Greater Tokyo: the Amusement Machine (AM) Show and the AOU Show, respectively.

== History ==
The Amusement Machine Show, or AM Show, was sponsored by the Japan Amusement Machinery Manufacturers Association (JAMMA) and the Japan Amusement Park Equipment Association (JAPEA). In 2012, JAMMA and JAPEA merged and reincorporated as the Japan Amusement Machine and Marketing Association. They partnered with the Amusement Machine Operators' Union to promote a single event.

The AM Show was scheduled for one weekend in either September, October, or November; the AOU Show occurred in February. When the events merged, the organisers retained the AOU Show's February schedule.

The 49th Amusement Machine Show was held on 15–17 September 2011 at Makuhari Messe (which remains the venue for JAEPO). The first two days of the expo were for industry invitees only, and the final day was open to the public.

The final AOU Show was the weekend of 18 February 2012; it, too, was held at Makuhari Messe. AOU was a two-day event in which the second day was open to the public.

== See also ==
- Taiwan Amusement and Gaming Expo
