= Dogyuun =

1992 video game

- Developer: Toaplan
- Publisher: Toaplan
- Producer: Toshiaki Ōta
- Designers: Itsuo Matsumura; Kaneyo Ōhira; Kōetsu Iwabuchi
- Programmers: Hiroaki Furukawa; Tomoaki Takanohashi
- Artists: Junya Inoue; Miho Hayashi; Yuko Tataka
- Composer: Tatsuya Uemura
- Platform: Arcade
- Release: WW: November 1992
- Genre: Vertically scrolling shooter
- Modes: Single-player, multiplayer

Dogyuun (Note: Japanese: ドギューン!!, Hepburn: Dogyūn!!) is a 1992 vertically scrolling shooter arcade video game developed and published by Toaplan. Set on the colonized fictional planet of Dino in the future, where an alien race of metallic robots have invaded a police communication center and held its inhabitants as hostages, players assume the role of two fighter pilots taking control of the Sylfers bomber space fighter crafts in a revenge attempt to overthrow the invaders and free the surviving colonists after their comrade is killed by one of them during a reconnaissance assignment.

Headed by Tamsoft founder and Battle Arena Toshinden producer Toshiaki Ōta, Dogyuun was created by most of the same team that previously worked on several projects at Toaplan such as Snow Bros. and who would later go on to work at one of its offshoots after the company declared bankruptcy in 1994, putting emphasis on visuals instead of gameplay. The team originally planned on making a mecha title, but later settled on doing a vertically scrolling shooter instead after initial testings of the mech game proved to be unsuccessful, while integrating some of their original ideas from the former project into the final release. It is also notable for marking the debut of mangaka and Knuckle Bash designer Junya Inoue in the video game industry, serving as one of its graphic designers.

Dogyuun was praised by reviewers for its visuals, sound design, gameplay, multiplayer, challenge and overall intensity, but others felt that some of its mechanics were underdeveloped. As of 2019, the rights to the title alongside many other Toaplan IPs is owned by Tatsujin, a company founded in 2017 by former Toaplan member Masahiro Yuge.

== Gameplay ==
Gameplay screenshot

Dogyuun is a science fiction-themed vertically scrolling shoot 'em up game reminiscent of Aero Fighters and Recca, where players assume the role of two pilots who took part in a reconnaissance mission on planet Dino. They take control of the Sylfers bomber space fighter crafts through ten stages in a revenge effort to defeat an invading alien race of metallic robots that have captured a police communication center and its inhabitants after their comrade, Kyle, was killed by one of them. As far as vertical scrolling shooters go, the game initially appears to be very standard; players start with a single laser beam that can be held on at close range for dealing minimal damage against enemies when not firing. Other weapons can be found by destroying incoming carriers, ranging from homing lasers to a lightning beam, which is distinguished by its color. If a weapon module of the same color is picked up, a 5000-point bonus is granted.

A unique gameplay feature is the "Unit Beam" system where players have the ability to combine the two ships into one and increase their firepower much further than normal. This can prove to be a very risky proposition, however, as both ships can be destroyed by a single shot or by colliding against enemies. Players are able to detach their ships at any given time. When separated, players are also able to capture a small enemy to gain points continually or hold items for later use. There are only two types of item modules that can be attached to the ships; a single-use bomb module capable of obliterating any enemy caught within its blast radius that can also be triggered after taking enemy hits and a speed module which enhances the ship's speed to help avoid enemy fire, in addition to activating a set of two satellite "options" when using the default weapon.

On some occasions, players can pick up a spinning 1UP icon with two different sides. One side grants an extra live after being picked up and the other side grants 100,000 points. Similar to Gun Frontier, the game hosts a number of hidden bonus secrets to be found, which is also crucial for reaching high-scores to obtain extra lives. The game uses a checkpoint system and if the player manages to reach one, they will respawn there instead of having to restart at the beginning of the stage. The original Japanese version employs a mechanism where the difficulty will max out. Getting hit by enemy fire will result in losing a live and once all lives are lost, the game is over unless players insert more credits into the arcade machine to continue playing. Although there is an ending, the game loops back to the first stage after completing the last stage as with previous shoot 'em ups from Toaplan and each loop increases in difficulty; reaching the fifth loop results in a kill screen that crashes the arcade hardware.

== Synopsis ==
Dogyuun takes place in a future where transmission with a police communication center on the planet Dino has ceased. Three pilots were sent for a reconnaissance assignment in order to determine the current situation before one of them, Kyle, is assaulted and killed by a metallic robot from an invading alien race, indicating that the communication center has been overrun by them and held its personnel as hostages. Seeking revenge for the death of their comrade, the two pilots embark on a full counterattack against the aliens with their Sylfers bomber crafts.

== Development and release ==
Most of the artwork were hand-drawn sketches created by the development team before being transpose to pixel art graphics.

Dogyuun was created by most of the same team that worked on previous projects at Toaplan such as Snow Bros. and who would also later go on to work at one of its offshoots after the company declared bankruptcy in 1994. Its development was helmed by a small team at the company with producer Toshiaki Ōta, who shared the role of programmer alongside Hiroaki Furukawa and composer Tatsuya Uemura, among other people collaborating in its development. The development team at Toaplan originally had plans on making a mecha game featuring a robot as the main protagonist in order to convey the experience of destruction by using a mech, but after initial testings at the company, the team felt it would not work and they settled on doing a vertically scrolling shooter instead. Uemura has since stated that remaining work done on the scrapped mech title was repurposed into Dogyuun, whose name was suggested and approved by himself.

When working on the project, Uemura and the team planned on putting emphasis towards visuals capable of making an impact over gameplay as a response from their audience who felt their previous efforts did not impress in terms of presentation and graphics. Uemura later remarked that gameplay suffered as a result due to graphics taking priority during the creation period which lasted longer than previous releases from Toaplan. Uemura also stated that the main reason the game crashes after reaching the fifth loop is because nobody in the development team was able to complete all the loops. Junya Inoue designed the game's graphics in his first video game role prior to Knuckle Bash. Inoue was first introduced to the gaming industry during his youth with Capcom's Ghosts 'n Goblins and joined Toaplan in 1991 after looking at a recruitment ad from the company on Gamest.

== Release ==
Dogyuun was released in arcades in November 1992. Early previews prior to release at events such as the 1992 AOU Show showcased several differences compared to the final game. An album was co-published exclusively in Japan by Scitron and Pony Canyon in February 1993, featuring an arranged song co-composed by Uemura and Inoue. A promotional recording sent by Toaplan to arcade operators also features arranged songs not present in the 1993 album.

In 2022, the game was included as part of the Sega Astro City Mini V, a vertically-oriented variant of the Sega Astro City mini console, marking its first appearance outside the arcades. In 2025, it was included in the compilation Toaplan Arcade Collection Vol. 1 for PlayStation 4, PlayStation 5, Xbox One, Xbox Series X/S, and Nintendo Switch.

== Reception and legacy ==
Reception

Review score
Publication	Score
Gamest	52/70; 33/50

Dogyuun garnered positive reception from seven reviewers of Gamest during its 1992 AOU Show appearance and has become a well regarded title from Toaplan by reviewers in recent years. Electronic Gaming Monthly praised its intensity, gameplay and visuals. In Japan, Game Machine listed it in their December 15, 1992 issue as being the eleventh most-successful table arcade unit at the time. GamesMaster noted its "fast and furious" action. Nick Zverloff of Hardcore Gaming 101 praised Inoue and Uemura's artwork and soundtrack respectively, challenge, weapon set and the ability to combine two ships, among other aspects. Malcolm Laurie from SHMUPS! praised the detailed graphics, boss fights and soundtrack, regarding it as one of Toaplan's lesser known, but best titles, although he noted the weapon system to be one of its negative points. Likewise, Illusionware's Marco D'Andrea praised its visuals and music, but said some of the mechanics felt underdeveloped. Den of Geek noted it to be one of the titles from Toaplan which intensively pushed the formula established by their previous endeavors.

The game served as an influence for titles such as FULLSET's Project Neon for Neo Geo system. In more recent years, the rights to Dogyuun and many other IPs from Toaplan are now owned by Tatsujin, a company named after Truxton's Japanese title that was founded in 2017 by former Toaplan employee Masahiro Yuge and is part of Embracer Group since 2022.
