= FixEight =

1992 video game

Fixeight
- Developers: Toaplan exA-Arcadia (EXA Label)
- Publishers: Toaplan exA-Arcadia (EXA Label)
- Designer: Nanpei Kaneko
- Composer: Toshiaki Tomizawa
- Platforms: Arcade, exA-Arcadia, Windows
- Release: JP: July 1992; NA: October 1992; Steam: February 2024; GOG: February 2024
- Genre: Run and gun
- Modes: Single-player, multiplayer

FixEight (Note: Also known as FixEight: The Legend of Heroes of Hell (Japanese: フィグゼイト －地獄の英雄伝説－, Hepburn: FixEight: Jigoku no Eiyū Densetsu) in Japan.) is a run and gun arcade video game developed and published by Toaplan in July 1992. The spiritual successor to 1990's Out Zone, it is notable for being one of the few titles by Toaplan that has not received any official port to home consoles as of date. Set in a future where an alien race known as the Gozzu from the fictional planet Fortuna invaded the universe, players are tasked by the Galactic Federation government with an extermination mission against the invaders by assuming the role of one of the eight mercenaries.

As of 2019, the rights to FixEight is owned by Tatsujin, a company founded in 2017 by former Toaplan member Masahiro Yuge and now-affiliate of Japanese arcade manufacturer exA-Arcadia alongside many other Toaplan IPs.

== Gameplay ==
Gameplay screenshot

FixEight is a science fiction-themed vertically scrolling run and gun game similar to Out Zone, where players assume the role of one of the eight playable mercenaries through seven increasingly difficult stages, each with a boss at the end that must be fought before progressing any further, in an effort to exterminate the invading Gozzu alien race on planet Fortuna as the main objective. Players fight enemies on foot and move upward through the level. The players are also equipped with a number of "X" bombs capable of any enemy caught in its blast radius at the start, rendering players invincible for a brief period of time after using a bomb and the player's stock is refilled with "B" icons.

Returning from Out Zone is its weapon system, albeit modified. Players are equipped with two main weapons at the beginning that can be upgraded by picking up "P" icons and switch between them at will by standing below a change panel but unlike its predecessor, each character has their own weapon set, as well as their own special weapon that is acquired through a "?" icon. Grabbing the "?" icon after obtaining the special weapon grants other attributes such as increasing the character's overall speed or shield. Other items like gold bars and gold statues can also be picked up for points. Omitted from its predecessor is the energy bar system where player had to remain aware of their depleting energy level.

If a single player is downed, their character is immediately respawned at the location they died at, unlike its predecessor's checkpoint system. Getting hit by enemy fire, colliding against solid stage obstacles or falling off the stage will result in losing a life, as well as a penalty of decreasing the characters' firepower and speed to his original state and once all lives are lost, the game is over unless the players insert more credits into the arcade machine to continue playing. Although there is an ending, the game loops back to the first stage after completing the last stage as with previous titles from Toaplan, with the second loop increasing the difficulty and enemies fire denser bullet patterns, in addition to spawning extra bullets when destroyed (sometimes called 'suicide bullets' or 'ricochet effect'). Defeating the second loop results in being sent back to the first stage, starting the third loop.

== Synopsis ==
=== Plot ===
FixEight takes place in a future where an alien race known as the Gozzu from the planet Fortuna have invaded the universe, prompting the Galactic Federation government with releasing a group of eight mercenaries from their imprisonment in an asteroid prison and sending them to Fortuna with the task of exterminating the invaders alongside their planet.

=== Characters ===
- Howard Young is a North American war veteran who was confined to prison and contracted a disease.
- GX-026 is an android who single-handedly obliterated 26 planets across the galaxy in one year.
- Vistario is a lizard-like space pirate from the Oligo star.
- Agatha Bordeaux is a former Italian supermodel warrior who was jailed for treason. Her portrait at the character selection screen bears resemblance with actress Sharon Stone.
- Lucy Pamela is the princess of a kingdom who was imprisoned after killing a king. Her portrait at the character selection screen bears resemblance with actress Vanessa Paradis.
- Cull Horn is an African leader of an army who was prosecuted for betrayal. His portrait at the character selection screen bears resemblance to former professional boxer Mike Tyson.
- Hayate Zigragi is a ninja of unknown origin and identity who was sent to prison for his assassination attempt against the president of the Galactic Federation government.
- Remlias L'Angelo is a mineral-like being from Christo star who was captured after commanding a rebellion to fight against enemy troops in a war to protect nature.

== Development and release ==
FixEight was released in arcades in July 1992. Despite sharing the same gameplay mechanics, Out Zone composer Tatsuya Uemura revealed in a 2017 podcast that FixEight was not directly related to its predecessor, although he and members of the original team had no involvement during development. According to former Toaplan designer Junya Inoue, FixEight was designed by Nanpei Kaneko, a member who would later work on Knuckle Bash before quitting the company and work as illustrator for Japanese magazines. The soundtrack was composed by Toshiaki Tomizawa. On October 21 of the same year, an album was co-published exclusively in Japan by Scitron and Pony Canyon, featuring an arranged song composed by Tomizawa. A promotional recording sent by Toaplan to arcade operators also features an arranged song not present in the 1992 album.

== Reception and legacy ==
In Japan, Game Machine listed FixEight on their September 1, 1992 issue as being the ninth most-successful table arcade unit of the month, outperforming titles such as X-Men. In the November 1992 issue of Japanese publication Micom BASIC Magazine, the game was ranked on the number six spot in popularity. Nick Zverloff of Hardcore Gaming 101 gave positive remarks to FixEight related to several improvements made over its predecessor and regarded it as "one of the most improved sequels Toaplan ever made". Den of Geek noted it to be one of the titles from Toaplan which intensively pushed the formula established by their previous endeavors. In more recent years, the rights to the game, its predecessor and many other IPs from Toaplan are now owned by Tatsujin, a company named after Truxton's Japanese title that was founded in 2017 by former Toaplan employee Masahiro Yuge, who are part of the Embracer Group.
