= List of Btooom! episodes =

- Cover of the first Blu-ray volume released by FlyingDog in Japan on November 21, 2012.
- No. of episodes: 12

Release
- Original network: Tokyo MX
- Original release: October 4 – December 20, 2012

Btooom! is an anime series adapted from the manga of the same title by Jun'ya Inoue. The story takes place after the release of a Massively multiplayer online game called Btooom! In the game players are required to utilize stealth and strategy to eliminate each other using the only weapons available to them—a sonar ability to detect nearby players and bombs. One day Ryota Sakamoto awakens to find himself stranded on a tropical island with a pouch full of bombs and a computer chip embedded in his hand. He soon learns that he has been entered into a competition where he must play Btooom! for real—where losing means death.

Produced by Madhouse and directed by Kotono Watanabe, the series was broadcast on Tokyo MX from October 4 to December 20, 2012, and was later aired on Sun TV, KBS, TV Aichi, BS11 and AT-X along with online streaming on Niconico. The series was picked up by Crunchyroll for online simulcast streaming in North America and other select parts of the world. The Anime Network later acquired the series for streaming on their online service. FlyingDog released the series in Japan on six Blu-ray and DVD volumes starting on November 21, 2012. The anime was licensed by Sentai Filmworks for distribution in North America. Hanabee Entertainment later licensed the series for release in Australia. MVM Entertainment also acquired the series for distribution in the United Kingdom.

The opening theme song is "No Pain, No Game" by nano while the ending theme is "Aozora" (アオゾラ) by May'n. The twelfth episode uses "Exist" (エグジスト) by nano as the opening theme while "No Pain, No Game" is used as the ending theme.

== Episode list ==
No.	Official English title (Note: All English titles are taken from Sentai Filmworks.) Original Japanese title	Original airdate (Note: Btooom! premiered in Tokyo MX's Thursday 23:00 (11:00 pm JST) time slot.)
1	"START"	October 4, 2012
Ryōta Sakamoto, an unemployed 22-year-old, is an elite Japanese player of Btooom!, an MMO which sold almost three million copies worldwide, with his team ranked as tenth in the world. In the present, an amnesiac Ryōta awakens in a parachute harness on a tropical island, only equipped with his bag containing a few necessities, a pouch full of countdown bomb-like weapons called Timer BIMs and a strange bead-like chip embedded on his left hand. Ryōta vaguely recalls a dispute he had with his mother Yukie Sakamoto, who wanted him to get a job rather than playing video games at home all day, but he harshly stated that he was pursuing a job at the video game company. After he visited a convenience store to revoke a job application Yukie turned in for him, he is met by two men, at which point his memory dissolves. At night on the beach, he is pursued by someone named Yoshiaki Imagawa, who attacks him with Cracker BIMs. Failing to reason with Yoshiaki, Ryōta is forced to evade behind the bushes, realizing that he is forced to play Btooom! for real. When Yoshiaki corners him near a cliff, Ryōta then sets a trap by leaving a Timer BIM on the cliff and jumping into the ocean, which kills his assailant unawares. Ryōta later dreams of yet another fight with Yukie about job hunting. He then stumbles through the jungle near a river, where a girl is seen refreshing herself.
2	"The Bloody High School Girl"; Transliteration: "Chi no Joshikōsei" (Japanese: 血の女子高生)	October 11, 2012
A girl named Himiko tells her best friend Miho that she was invited to play Btooom! with Ryōta. Himiko discusses with Miho, Arisa and Yuki about a strange chain letter that had been making the rounds on the internet that claims to reward anyone with 100,000 yen in exchange for allowing the "disappearance" of a named person of the email receiver's choosing. In the present, Himiko discovers herself parachuted onto the island, equipped with limited rations, a pouch full of bombs and a stun gun. She later awakens to find herself amid three men, them being Masashi Miyamoto, Mitsuo Akechi and Isamu Kondō, teaming up with them. When Isamu catches the others eating food without fair portions, he arises a dispute, but is killed by Masashi, who slit his throat. Himiko and Mitsuo sneak out at night while Masashi is asleep, but when he catches up to them, Mitsuo throws a Blazing Gas BIM at him to scare him away. In a flashback, Himiko and her friends are invited by an upperclassman named Yoshioka and his three other band members. When Himiko shows up late, she discovers her friends were beaten and raped by Yoshioka and his band members. They attempt to rape Himiko, but she escapes and alerts the authorities. However, her friends, especially Miho, had to relocate due to trauma. Back in the present, Mitsuo becomes delusional, but Himiko stuns him and runs away. However, he finds and sexually assaults her. Mitsuo runs away when Himiko activates one of her Timer BIMs as a last resort, throwing it at him and killing him after it explodes. Himiko then deems that everyone on the island is her enemy, especially the men. At this point, when Himiko is refreshing herself at the river, she is discovered by Ryōta.
3	"Survival"; Transliteration: "Sabaibaru" (Japanese: サバイバル)	October 18, 2012
Ryōta attempts to inquire Himiko about her case full of food, but she runs away in the bushes. When Ryōta tries to locate her, he instead stumbles upon a man named Kiyoshi Taira defecating in the bushes. Kiyoshi explains that he was also approached by two men after which he woke up on a cargo plane with a small crowd of people, who are all informed by a cheerful man on screen about their participation in a death game on the tropical island. After they all learned that the objective of completing the game is to collect IC chips from eight other participants after they are killed, many of them were infuriated, but masked men aboard the plane armed with stun guns subdued them. Ryōta was the most outspoken of the group and seemed to know the man in charge, but he was shocked in the head with a stun gun, which explained his lost memories. The plane reached the island and the participants were thrown out with parachutes. Ryōta realizes that Tyrannos Japan, the group who created Btooom!, was most likely responsible for this. As Ryōta and Kiyoshi decide to team up to improve their odds, they notice another plane dropping food supplies onto the island. When Ryōta races after a food supply, a woman named Misako Hōjō reaches it first, only for her to be killed by a trap set by a man, who takes it and leaves. Ryōta and Kiyoshi then contemplate on whether they should pursue another parachute, but they eventually decide to do so since they would not be able to defend themselves if their strength is low. Upon reaching the parachute, they discover a small boy covered in blood who appears to have killed another man after the food supply.
4	"Best in the World"; Transliteration: "Sekai Rankā" (Japanese: 世界ランカー)	October 25, 2012
In the past, a 14-year-old sadistic necrophiliac named Kōsuke Kira was arrested for murdering three women. Back in the present, a lawyer named Sōichi Natsume discovers Kōsuke near the shore, skewering frogs for fun. Sōichi tries to explain that it is wrong to kill living things out of amusement, but Kōsuke rejects the explanation. After a food supply drops nearby, the two investigate it with Kōsuke's abusive father, Yoshihisa Kira. Yoshihisa, after forcing his son to use an Implosion BIM to retrieve the food supply from a tree, decides to take the case for himself, going on about the survival of the fittest. Kōsuke, tired of the abuse, activates an Implosion BIM on Yoshihisa and kills him, feeling a rush of euphoria. Sōichi runs away frightened, saying Kōsuke is akin to a monster. At this point, Kōsuke is discovered by Ryōta and Kiyoshi, who retreat after failing to reason with him. As Kōsuke chases after them with the intent to kill, Ryōta decides to fight in order to protect Kiyoshi. Ryōta and Kōsuke soon recognize each other as Btooom! players and engage. After Kōsuke taunts and attacks him, Ryōta hits his head against a rock, which causes a personality shift where he perceives reality as being the game world. Ryōta defeats Kōsuke by hiding his movements with advanced sonar cancelling. Although Ryōta cannot bring himself to kill Kōsuke, Ryōta binds him to a tree, taking his food supply and BIMs. When Ryōta leaves, Kōsuke is thrilled to learn Ryōta is actually the top ranked Japanese player of Btooom!.
5	"Attack"; Transliteration: "Kyōshū" (Japanese: 強襲)	November 1, 2012
Ryōta returns with the food supply case to Kiyoshi. In a flashback, Hisanobu Sakamoto, Ryōta stepfather, caught Yukie trying to commit suicide after regretting causing him to "disappear". While Ryōta and Kiyoshi are eating near the river, the corpse of Mitsuo without pants washes downstream, leaving Ryōta and Kiyoshi to speculate. Ryōta, suspecting that an enemy may be lurking upstream, goes to investigate and discovers Himiko waiting atop a cliff. She draws him out into the open by throwing a Blazing Gas BIM into the forest. Although he attempts to reason with her, she attacks him with a Cracker BIM, prompting him to charge at her. She uses her stun gun to defend herself, but Ryōta causes her to stun herself and land on top of him. He is tempted to grope her while she is unconscious, but he pieces together that she was previously assaulted by Mitsuo. Himiko awakens in Ryōta's arms and, upon the fear of being violated again, activates a Timer BIM hidden in her pocket, but Ryōta deactivates it. Back at the campsite, she explains to Ryōta and Kiyoshi that everyone on the island had been picked by someone they knew to "disappear". Himiko knows that her friends chose her for being betrayed, Kiyoshi deduces that a real estate customer might have chosen him due to an argument and Ryōta realizes that his own mother had chosen him for defying her. Suddenly, the group is attacked by a pack of Komodo dragons.
6	"Night of Sacrifice"; Transliteration: "Ikenie no Yoru" (Japanese: 生贄の夜)	November 8, 2012
After Himiko passes out, Kiyoshi carries her to the other side of the river, leaving Ryōta to handle the Komodo dragons. Ryōta realizes that the BIMs are rendered useless until their owner is dead. After a Komodo dragon bites Kiyoshi's leg, Ryōta manages to activate one of his Cracker BIMs to scare it off. While Ryōta carries Himiko on his back, Kiyoshi carries all the food supplies and BIMs, lamenting that he is being punished by being put on the island for being a monster at his job, but a Komodo dragon appears and causes the two to get separated. Ryōta, failing to locate Kiyoshi using his sonar and assuming that he is being abandoned, is nearly attacked by a Komodo dragon. Kiyoshi undoubtedly returns and kills it using a Homing BIM, confirming that their sonars cancelled out when they were searching for each other. They are followed by more Komodo dragons to an abandoned communications tower near the sea. Kiyoshi tries to hold off the Komodo dragons using Homing BIMs, but not to much effect. This prompts Ryōta to use one of Himiko's Blazing Gas BIMs, by using her finger to activate the switch, to drive the Komodo dragons away. After Himiko later regains consciousness, she still shows trauma after Ryōta just touches her on the shoulder. After Kiyoshi's leg becomes infected, Ryōta has Himiko hold Kiyoshi down to disinfect it. Back in the mainland, it is revealed that Tyrannos Japan is monitoring the events on the island, especially with a special interest in Ryōta. As Ryōta notices the variety of food supplies and BIMs that Himiko possesses, he concludes that she had murdered many other participants, putting her under suspicion. As they are suddenly discovered by another participant's sonar, Ryōta decides to be a decoy to draw the assailant away from his friends. In the forest, Ryōta is attacked by the assailant, revealed to be Masashi.
7	"Virtual Bride"; Transliteration: "Kasō Hanayome" (Japanese: 仮想花嫁)	November 15, 2012
In the past, Ryōta and Himiko got married in the Btooom! world, but Himiko did not want to meet him in the real world just yet. Ryōta, realizing that Masashi and Sōichi are working together, is overpowered and has his BIMs confiscated. Although Masashi allows Ryōta to escape after shocking Sōichi with a stun gun, this was his plan to track Ryōta back to the abandoned communications tower. Ryōta tries to reason with Masashi, saying that the entire scenario was set up by Tyrannos Japan to iron out bugs in Btooom!, as there may be a loophole allowing everyone to survive. However, Masashi actually revels in this, slicing Kiyoshi's fingers off and pushing Ryōta off the cliff into the trees before he leaves. Ryōta returns unharmed and finds Himiko's phone, realizing she may be the same Himiko whom he knew in the game, judging from her cosplay wallpaper. At another abandoned building, Masashi and Sōichi tie Himiko down on a bed and proceed to torture her a bit. Ryōta, leaving Kiyoshi behind, uses his sonar to signal and locate Himiko, prompting Masashi and Sōichi to search for him. After untying her, Ryōta questions if she was the Himiko he once played with in Btooom!, but she denies this. The two are attacked by Sōichi, who is consequently killed by his own Cracker BIM that Ryōta previously disabled. Masashi then holds Himiko hostage, challenging Ryōta to a fistfight. Instead, he rushes for Masashi's knife, only to be beaten to the ground. Himiko then jumps on Masashi and activates a Blazing Gas BIM on him, sending a plume of gas after them. Ryōta and Himiko try to escape by going through an opening in the ceiling, but not long before a severely burnt Masashi grabs Himiko's leg to drag her back down. However, Ryōta reactivates Sōichi's Timer BIM, which soon detonates and kills Masashi. In an unknown location, a large number of Tyrannos Japan executives view Ryōta's victory over Masashi.
8	"White Ghost"; Transliteration: "Shiroi Bōrei" (Japanese: 白い亡霊)	November 22, 2012
In a flashback, Himiko was cast out by her former friends, so she retreated to the game world and met with Ryōta, who sensed her discomfort but chose not to inquire about it. In the mainland, Tyrannos Japan discusses the game's progress noting the psychological warfare between the participants. Ryōta and Himiko take refuge in yet another abandoned building at night. Ryōta explains that he views the game world more as reality, especially with his relationship with the Himiko he knew in Btooom!, hence his reason for saving her from Masashi. Himiko silently breaks into tears, not expecting to meet Ryōta in the real world and afraid of revealing her true identity as the Himiko in the game world due to her previous traumatic experiences. Himiko wakes up at the middle of the night and screams upon the sight of a ghost. Ryōta investigates and discovers a seemingly crazed woman living nearby, knocking her out when she attacks him. Ryōta brings Himiko with him to calm down the woman, recognized as Shiki Murasaki, who was a survivor from a previous iteration of the Btooom! death game and lost trust in men. Shiki was a nurse at an understaffed hospital, working with a doctor named Masahito Date, who blamed her for his medical malpractice. As they were both chosen to participate in the death game, Masahito blasts off her left arm after obtaining six IC chips and takes her IC chip in betrayal to leave the island via helicopter. Himiko, knowing full well that her loyalty with Ryōta will be tested, returns to Ryōta, who plans to get eight IC chips as a way to hijack a helicopter to free both them as well as Kiyoshi and Shiki. As Ryōta and Himiko say goodbye to Shiki, it is revealed that Masahito was sent back to the island to treat Kiyoshi's wounds.
9	"The Strongest Player"; Transliteration: "Saikyō Pureiyā" (Japanese: 最強プレイヤー)	November 29, 2012
Ryōta and Himiko return to Kiyoshi, who has his wounds treated by Masahito, who tricks them all into gaining their trust, discreetly intending to betray them and take their IC chips later on. A new food supply case arrive on the island, urging Ryōta, Himiko and Masahito to rush for it. Ryōta engages in a fight with man wearing sunglasses named Nobutaka Oda. Masahito catches the food supply case and brings it towards Ryōta, who runs away from Nobutaka. However, after a fire occurs, Nobutaka grabs onto the food supply case and dives off a cliff into the ocean, as to which Ryōta follows him. Meanwhile, Himiko is attacked by a young female named Hidemi Kinoshita, who constantly taunts her. While they are fighting, Masahito throws a Remote Control BIM their way intending to kill them both. However, he notices that Himiko is still alive and pretends that he was trying to save her. Himiko, quietly deducing that Masahito is lying through his teeth and wary of his deception, admits to her herself that Ryōta is the only person she can trust. Ryōta resurfaces near a beach and witnesses a man named Tomoaki Iwakura fall for Nobutaka's booby trap. Ryōta comes out of hiding and threatens Nobutaka with a Cracker BIM telling him to drop all his equipment. Nobutaka obeys which causes Ryōta to get suspicious. As Ryōta approaches the equipment, Nobutaka activates a hidden Remote Control BIM and seemingly kills Ryōta. But when Nobutaka activates his sonar, he is surprised to see Ryōta still alive.
10	"High Level"; Transliteration: "Hai Reberu" (Japanese: ハイレベル)	December 6, 2012
Tyrannos Japan reviews the fight between Ryōta and Nobutaka, seeing that Ryōta is able to anticipate Nobutaka's strategy, in which he chose to back away and leave behind the cache of his equipment. Nobutaka leaves after he realizes who he was fighting, leaving Ryōta to wonder how Nobutaka knows his name. When Ryōta, Himiko and Masahito return to Kiyoshi, it dawns on Ryōta to remember that Nobutaka was his best friend back in high school, up until Nobutaka slept with Ryōta's crush named Serizawa Aiko. After Masahito mentions that more food supplies will arrive at noon the next day, he suggests that a serum is needed to heal Kiyoshi's wounds. Ryōta and Himiko bring Masahito to Shiki's house to retrieve the medicine. As the three split up, Masahito finds some expired medicine and puts them in his case, which he entrusts to Ryōta, who has a strange feeling about this. When Ryōta signals Himiko, she comes running back and shouts at him to drop the case. This is because Masahito discreetly placed a Remote Control BIM inside the case, which soon detonates.
11	"Revival"; Transliteration: "Fukkatsu" (Japanese: 復活)	December 13, 2012
After Ryōta is seeming killed, Himiko loses the will to fight, but Shiki saves her and wounds Masahito with a sickle. Ten minutes earlier, Himiko met with Shiki, who told her that Masahito planted a Remote Control BIM inside his case before handing it to Ryōta. In the present, Himiko and Shiki are reluctant to know that Masahito planted traps in the surrounding area. After Masahito sets off a Remote Control BIM on Shiki, Himiko laments on never having the chance of reveal her true identity to Ryōta. Masahito throws one of Ryōta's Cracker BIM at Himiko, but it fails to detonate, as it is revealed that Ryōta has survived, in that he managed to get rid of the case before it exploded five minutes earlier. Masahito runs from Ryōta to lure him into another trap and activates the Remote Control BIM, not knowing that Ryōta had moved the Remote Control BIM to another location, which explodes and injures Masahito. Ryōta and Himiko hesitate to finish him off, until Shiki appears, eager to kill him. At the last moment, she alters the path of the blade next to him, saying she will never forgive him. While Himiko takes an outdoor shower, Ryōta wonders to her why Shiki spared Masahito. Afterwards, Ryōta and Himiko ascertain that the corpses of Yoshiaki, Mitsuo and Yoshihisa have their IC chips removed. As the two head back to their place, Ryōta realizes that Kiyoshi would be the only one who knew about the three corpses. When Ryōta begins climbing the ladder, he hears a Homing BIM approaching and figures out that Kiyoshi has turned against them.
12	"Bonds"; Transliteration: "Kizuna" (Japanese: 絆)	December 20, 2012
Kiyoshi, having hallucinations of his son Yuzuhiko Taira and his wife Akiho Taira both waiting for his return, targets Ryōta from the forest with his Homing BIM. Ryōta dodges the Homing BIM, only to be targeted by another, injuring his leg while he blames himself for Kiyoshi's ordeal. Supported by Himiko, they are able to avoid more Homing BIMs, in which Kiyoshi panics and flees. When Ryōta and Himiko go after him, Ryota tries to apologize for his actions. Kiyoshi, feeling sorry for betraying them, commits suicide with his last Homing BIM when he becomes surrounded by the Komodo dragons as a way to atone for his sins. As Ryōta mourns for him, Himiko takes all the IC chips off of Kiyoshi and they return to their hideout. There, Himiko asks Ryōta to kill her so that he can leave the island, but he refuses. Ryōta then finally recognizes Himiko as the person he knew from Btooom!, and they both have an intimate exchange. Ryōta stops when he senses her fear, but after confronting Nobutaka in his mind, he promises to date her for real when they return home. Elsewhere back on the mainland, several employees from Tyrannos Japan leave for the island, when it is said there is mechanical problems on the island. Tsuneaki Iida, one of the employees, silently apologizes to Ryōta, saying that it was the best he could do, perhaps a sign that he did something to help Ryōta.

== Home media ==
FlyingDog released the series in Japan on six Blu-ray and DVD volumes between November 21, 2012 and April 24, 2013. The complete series was released on Blu-ray and DVD volumes by Sentai Filmworks on December 10, 2013 and Hanabee Entertainment on February 8, 2014. MVM Entertainment released the series on March 17, 2014, on DVD format only. These releases contained English and Japanese audio options and English subtitles.

FlyingDog (Region 2 - Japan)
Vol.	Episodes	Blu-ray / DVD artwork	Bonus disc	BD / DVD Release date	BD Ref.	DVD Ref.
1	1, 2	Ryota Sakamoto	Original Soundtrack Volume 1	November 21, 2012		
2	3, 4	Kosuke Kira & Ryota	CD	December 19, 2012		
3	5, 6	Himiko & Kiyoshi Taira	CD	January 23, 2013		
4	7, 8	Himiko	Original Soundtrack Volume 2	February 20, 2013		
5	9, 10	Nobutaka Oda & Hidemi Kinoshita	CD	March 20, 2013		
6	11, 12	Himiko & Ryota	CD	April 24, 2013		

Sentai Filmworks (Region 1 - North America)
Vol.	Episodes	Blu-ray / DVD artwork	BD / DVD Release date	BD Ref.	DVD Ref.
1	1–12	Ryota Sakamoto & Himiko	December 10, 2013		

Hanabee Entertainment (Region 4 - Australia / New Zealand)
Vol.	Episodes	Blu-ray / DVD artwork	BD / DVD Release date	BD Ref.	DVD Ref.
1	1–12	Ryota Sakamoto & Himiko	February 8, 2014		

MVM Entertainment (Region 2 - United Kingdom)
Vol.	Episodes	DVD artwork	DVD Release date	DVD Ref.
1	1–12	Ryota Sakamoto & Himiko	March 17, 2014	
