= Sailor Moon season 1 =

First season of the Sailor Moon anime series

Sailor Moon
- Season 1
- The Japanese logo for the first season, originally translating to Pretty Soldier Sailor Moon
- No. of episodes: 46

Release
- Original network: TV Asahi
- Original release: 7 March 1992 – 27 February 1993

Season chronology
- Next → Sailor Moon R

The first season of the Sailor Moon anime series was produced by Toei Animation and directed by Junichi Sato. It ran on TV Asahi from 7 March 1992 to 27 February 1993, lasting 46 episodes. The season was later released in eight DVD compilations between 21 May and 21 July 2002, and in two remastered box sets released between 11 December 2009 and 21 January 2010.

The season adapts the "Dark Kingdom" story arc of the Sailor Moon manga series by Naoko Takeuchi, following the adventures of Usagi Tsukino and the Sailor Guardians. After the magical cat Luna reveals Usagi's true identity as the titular character, Usagi fights to protect the Earth from the Dark Kingdom, an entity that previously destroyed the ancient Moon Kingdom and has returned to steal the mythical Silver Crystal and life energy from humankind to resurrect their entity and supreme ruler, Queen Metalia.

In 1995, DIC Entertainment licensed Sailor Moon for an English-language broadcast in North America, with dubbing services by Optimum Productions. Their dub of the first season, which reduced the episode count from 46 to 40, aired on YTV in Canada from 28 August to 24 October 1995, and in first-run syndication in the United States from 11 September to 3 November 1995. ADV Films later released a subtitle-only DVD box set of the season in 2003. In 2014, Viz Media licensed Sailor Moon for an updated English release produced by Studiopolis. Their re-dub of the first season began streaming on Neon Alley and Hulu on 19 May 2014, before being released in two DVD and Blu-ray compilations between 11 November 2014 and 10 February 2015.

The season uses three pieces of theme music: one opening theme and two closing themes. The opening theme for the whole season is "Moonlight Densetsu" performed by the idol group Dali. "Heart Moving", performed by Misae Takamatsu of Sakura Sakura, is used as the ending theme for the first 26 episodes, and "Princess Moon", performed by Ushio Hashimoto, is used for the remainder of the season. DIC Entertainment made an English-language version of the Japanese opening theme for its adaptation.

Several video games were released to promote the first season of Sailor Moon. Bandai subsidiary Angel published a 1992 game for the Game Boy and a 1993 game for the Super Nintendo Entertainment System, which was ported to the Sega Mega Drive by Arc System Works the following year. Additionally, Black HCS developed and published the 1993 beat 'em up video game Bishoujo Senshi Sailor Moon: Kessen Dark Kingdom for the Sharp X68000. In 1995, Gazelle developed the arcade game Pretty Soldier Sailor Moon, which was published by Banpresto.

== Episodes ==
Orig.	DiC	No. in season	DiC title Original Japanese & Viz titles	Directed by	Written by	Art directed by	Animation directed by	Original release date	English air date
1	1	1	"A Moon Star is Born" "The Crybaby: Usagi's Beautiful Transformation"; Transliteration: "Nakimushi Usagi no Karei naru Henshin" (Japanese: 泣き虫うさぎの華麗なる変身)	Junichi Sato	Sukehiro Tomita	Yoshiyuki Shikano	Hiromi Matsushita	7 March 1992	28 August 1995; 19 May 2014
One day, a 14-year-old middle school underachiever named Usagi Tsukino rescues a cat from being harassed by young boys while running late to school. After school, she and her friend Naru Osaka visit a local jewelry store owned by the latter's mother. After encountering Mamoru Chiba, the cat appears again and speaks; she introduces herself as Luna and gives Usagi a brooch that allows her to transform into Sailor Moon. Usagi then hears Naru in distress when attacked by the monster Morga, who impersonated Naru's mother and sold cursed jewelry that extracts energy from the wearers. Usagi arrives, but is attacked by the buyers who are controlled by Morga. A masked stranger wearing a tuxedo intervenes to help Usagi, who weakens Morga with her cries, allowing her to kill Morga and restore the girls to normal. Before departing, the stranger reveals himself to be Tuxedo Mask.
2	—	2	"Punishment Awaits! The House of Fortune is the Monster Mansion"; Transliteration: "Oshiokiyo! Uranai Hausu wa Yōma no Yakata" (Japanese: おしおきよ! 占いハウスは妖魔の館)	Takao Yoshizawa	Shigeru Yanagikawa	Yoshiyuki Shikano	Katsuji Matsumoto	14 March 1992	19 May 2014; 7 June 2024 (Note: The English broadcast premiere dates of Viz Media's dub on Adult Swim's Toonami Rewind programming block are shown for any episodes that were skipped over in DIC Entertainment's dub.)
Having failed his previous mission, Jadeite informs Queen Beryl, the leader of the Dark Kingdom, that his next plan involves fortune telling. Meanwhile, Usagi's classmate Gurio Umino confesses to Naru that he wants to go on a date with Usagi; Naru suggests he consult a fortune teller, but he goes to the House of Fortune, part of Jadeite's plan. Luna tells Usagi to go to a fortune teller to find out if Motoki admires her, but she also goes to the House of Fortune, along with many other students. Umino and some of the other students are hypnotized and cause trouble at school the next day. Realizing that the students were being hypnotized at the House of Fortune, Luna and Usagi infiltrate the house and encounter Balm, a monster disguised as the fortune teller. Balm orders her hypnotized subjects to attack Usagi, but Tuxedo Mask distracts her and, with his encouragement, Usagi kills Balm, returning the customers to normal.
3	2	3	"Talk Radio" "The Mysterious Sleeping Sickness: Protect the Girls in Love"; Transliteration: "Nazo no Nemuribyō, Mamore Otome no Koisuru Kokoro" (Japanese: 謎のねむり病、守れ乙女の恋する心)	Kazuhisa Takenouchi	Katsuyuki Sumisawa	Minoru Ōkōchi	Kunihiko Natsume	21 March 1992	29 August 1995; 19 May 2014
Jadeite has a new plan to gather energy from humans: together with the monster Furau, he creates a late-night radio show called "Line to the Heart". Homeroom teacher Haruna Sakurada and Naru submit love letters to the radio show, and they receive a pin that absorbs their energy. When they fall into a coma-like sleep, Usagi must investigate the radio station undercover. Luna gives Usagi a new accessory, a "Transformation Pen," to transform into any kind of professional. When she transforms into a radio host and sneaks into the station, she discovers Furau and Jadeite. She promptly transforms into Sailor Moon and defeats Furau. An angry Jadeite tries to finish her off, but Tuxedo Mask gets in the way, forcing him to leave.
4	3	4	"Slim City" "Learn How to Be Skinny From Usagi"; Transliteration: "Usagi ga Oshiemasu! Surimu ni naru Hō" (Japanese: うさぎが教えます! スリムになる法)	Harume Kosaka	Sukehiro Tomita	Yoshiyuki Shikano	Kiyoshi Matsumoto	28 March 1992	30 August 1995; 19 May 2014
Usagi gains a couple of pounds and starts obsessing about her weight. Jadeite starts a dubious health club to drain energy out of people and mind-controls three bodybuilders to help him run it. Usagi and her friends sign up after seeing how much weight Ms. Haruna has lost. Luna suspects that Ms. Haruna has fallen victim to the enemy and tries to convince a resigned Usagi to transform and help her. Usagi discovers tanks in the basement that are stealing life energy from people. As Sailor Moon, she frees the controlled bodybuilders, forcing Jadeite to shut down the health club.
5	—	5	"Scent of a Monster! Chanela Will Steal Your Love"; Transliteration: "Yōma no Kaori! Shanēra wa ai o Nusumu" (Japanese: 妖魔の香り! シャネーラは愛を盗む)	Yūji Endō	Shigeru Yanagikawa	Kenichi Tajiri	Ikuko Itō	11 April 1992	26 May 2014; 28 June 2024
Usagi wants her family to accept Luna as a pet, but her brother Shingo is afraid of cats. At a pet shop, he discovers a hypnotic creature called a Chanela and loses all interest in anything else. Realizing that her brother and other people have a strong obsession with Chanela, Usagi investigates the pet shop and, after transforming, defeats the monster responsible for their creation. Sailor Moon convinces Shingo, who is unaware she is Usagi, to keep Luna.
6	—	6	"Protect the Melody of Love: Usagi Plays Cupid"; Transliteration: "Mamore Koi no Merodi! Usagi wa Kyūpiddo" (Japanese: 守れ恋の曲! うさぎはキューピッド)	Kunihiko Ikuhara	Katsuyuki Sumisawa	Yoshiyuki Shikano	Kazuko Tadano	18 April 1992	26 May 2014; 5 July 2024
Jadeite creates a cassette tape that can drain life energy, but the monster he gives it to, Kyurene, promptly loses it. It ends up in the possession of a jazz pianist and composer named Yusuke Amade, and Usagi must disguise herself as an adult to protect him. Jadeite gives Kyurene an ultimatum to retrieve the tapes with negative subliminal waves and spread them through a radio station. The monster takes the tape from Yusuke Amade; Usagi interrupts it when it tries to kill him. Usagi and Amade follow the monster to the radio station, where Usagi defeats it.
7	4	7	"So You Want to Be a Superstar" "Usagi Learns Her Lesson: Becoming a Star is Hard Work"; Transliteration: "Usagi Hansei! Sutā no Michi wa Kibishī" (Japanese: うさぎ反省! スターの道はきびしい)	Junichi Sato	Shigeru Yanagikawa	Minoru Ōkōchi	Katsuji Matsumoto	25 April 1992	31 August 1995; 2 June 2014
Jadeite sets up a talent contest and has a human celebrity incapacitated and impersonated by the monster Derella, who hypnotizes people to get them to enter the contest. Luna notices that people are skiving off their usual activities to practice for the contest. Usagi, though terrified of facing Derella, transforms into Sailor Moon. Derella encases her in ice, but Tuxedo Mask breaks it, and Sailor Moon defeats the monster.
8	5	8	"Computer School Blues" "The Girl Genius is a Monster: The Brainwashing Cram School of Horror"; Transliteration: "Tensai Shōjo wa Yōma na no? Kyōfu no Sen'nō Juku" (Japanese: 天才少女は妖魔なの? 恐怖の洗脳塾)	Takao Yoshizawa	Sukehiro Tomita	Kenichi Tajiri	Kunihiko Natsume	2 May 1992	1 September 1995; 2 June 2014
Luna senses a strange aura around Usagi's genius classmate, Ami Mizuno, and thinks she might be a Dark Kingdom spy. Ami Mizuno is a very intelligent, reserved girl who is often seen alone at school. In the hope that Ami will help her improve her school performance, Usagi befriends her and invites her to the game center. Ami leaves a floppy disk in the game center; Luna and Usagi discover that it is an artifact from the Dark Kingdom and mistake her for an enemy. However, when a monster attacks, Luna realises Ami is Sailor Mercury, a Sailor Guardian like Sailor Moon; Luna gives Ami the ability to transform, and Ami defeats the monster.
9	6	9	"Time Bomb" "Usagi's Disaster: Beware of the Clock of Confusion"; Transliteration: "Usagi no Sainan! Awate Tokei ni Goyōjin" (Japanese: うさぎの災難! あわて時計にご用心)	Harume Kosaka	Katsuyuki Sumisawa	Kazuyuki Hashimoto	Akira Nakamura	9 May 1992	6 September 1995; 9 June 2014
Jadeite's new plan is to make humans work harder to increase their energy output with the help of Ramua, a monster that can manipulate time. Usagi's mother buys a new clock for her that drains her energy; Ami, now awakened as Sailor Mercury, helps Luna investigate. When Sailor Moon and Sailor Mercury meet, they confront Ramua, and Tuxedo Mask helps them defeat her by undoing the time spell with a rose.
10	7	10	"An Uncharmed Life" "The Cursed Bus: Enter Mars, the Guardian of Fire"; Transliteration: "Norowareta Basu! Honō no Senshi Māzu Tōjō" (Japanese: 呪われたバス! 炎の戦士マーズ登場)	Kazuhisa Takenouchi	Sukehiro Tomita	Yoshiyuki Shikano	Kiyoshi Matsumoto	16 May 1992	7 September 1995; 9 June 2014
Jadeite disguises himself as a servant in the nearby Hikawa Shrine to trick girls into using a bus that takes them to another dimension. Loaded buses are disappearing near the shrine, and most of Usagi's peers suspect that Rei Hino, a mysterious priestess at the shrine with strange psychic abilities, has something to do with it. The police also suspect the shrine's owners because the people who visit the shrine are the same ones who disappear on the bus. Jadeite sends Rei to another dimension after she discovers he is the real culprit. Luna wonders if she might be the moon princess, but it is later revealed that she is another Guardian, Sailor Mars. The Guardians escape the dimension with the captured girls.
11	8	11	"Nightmare in Dreamland" "Usagi vs. Rei: Nightmare in Dream Land"; Transliteration: "Usagi to Rei Taiketsu? Yume Rando no Akumu" (Japanese: うさぎとレイ対決? 夢ランドの悪夢)	Kunihiko Ikuhara	Shigeru Yanagikawa	Minoru Ōkōchi	Masahiro Ando	23 May 1992	8 September 1995; 16 June 2014
Luna meets with Usagi, Ami and Rei in the Hikawa Shrine to remind them of their mission as Guardians. Usagi and Rei begin their combative friendship. Beryl becomes increasingly furious with Jadeite for his repeated failures; he starts up a theme park, but the general public notices the large number of disappearances. With the help of the monster Murido, known in the park as the "Princess of Dreams", who absorbs people's energy through an apple, Jadeite gathers a lot of energy. Mamoru also investigates the case and meets Usagi and Rei, who tell him that he looks like Tuxedo Mask.
12	9	12	"Cruise Blues" "I Want a Boyfriend: The Luxury Cruise Ship is a Trap"; Transliteration: "Watashi Datte Kare ga Hoshī! Gōkasen no Wana" (Japanese: 私だって彼が欲しい! 豪華船のワナ)	Yūji Endō	Katsuyuki Sumisawa	Kenichi Tajiri	Kazuko Tadano	30 May 1992	11 September 1995; 16 June 2014
Thetis, one of Beryl's monsters, offers to help Jadeite with his plans using a cruise ship enchanted by her powers. Rei wins tickets on the cruise ship and, since she has no boyfriend, asks Ami to accompany her. A jealous Usagi disguised as a photographer sneaks aboard after them.
13	10	13	"Fight to the Finish" "Girls Unite: The End of Jadeite"; Transliteration: "On'na no ko wa Danketsu yo! Jedaito no Saigo" (Japanese: 女の子は団結よ! ジェダイトの最期)	Harume Kosaka	Sukehiro Tomita	Kazuyuki Hashimoto	Akira Nakamura	6 June 1992	12 September 1995; 23 June 2014
Beryl gives Jadeite an ultimatum to defeat the Sailor Guardians, which prompts him to create an illusion in the sky and challenge the Guardians to fight him at the airport. Usagi continues to be romantically infatuated with both Motoki Furuhata and Tuxedo Mask. Later, at the airport, Jadeite puts the policemen to sleep and replaces them with clay golems. The Guardians fight the golems and encounter Jadeite, who taunts the Guardians after taking on Tuxedo Mask and throwing him into the sea. The Guardians easily defeat Jadeite, prompting Beryl to permanently freeze him in crystal.
14	11	14	"Match Point for Sailor Moon" "A New Enemy Appears: Nephrite's Evil Crest"; Transliteration: "Arata naru Kyōteki, Nefuraito ma no Monshō" (Japanese: 新たなる強敵、ネフライト魔の紋章)	Junichi Sato	Shigeru Yanagikawa	Yoshiyuki Shikano	Hisashi Kagawa	13 June 1992	13 September 1995; 23 June 2014
Nephrite, the second of the Four Kings of Heaven, takes over as Beryl's main energy gatherer. He plans to gather more strength and power from individual humans at their strongest, rather than from groups, and starts by targeting Rue, a tennis player who is Naru's childhood friend. He disguises himself as "Masato Sanjouin", a wealthy businessman and socialite. Usagi and Naru are excited when they see Masato Sanjouin arrive at the sports club, where he intervenes in a match to implant a monster in Rue's racket. The monster causes her to become frighteningly skilled at tennis and aggressive, but it is uncovered by Usagi and defeated. Luna discovers the name of the enemy: Dark Kingdom.
15	12	15	"An Unnatural Phenomena" "Usagi's Panic: Rei's First Date"; Transliteration: "Usagi Aseru! Rei-chan Hatsu Dēto" (Japanese: うさぎアセる! レイちゃん初デート)	Kunihiko Ikuhara	Katsuyuki Sumisawa	Minoru Ōkōchi	Kiyoshi Matsumoto	20 June 1992	14 September 1995; 11 August 2014
Ami takes Usagi and Rei to see a park, and the caretaker tells them that it will soon be converted into an office building, with construction work already in progress. Usagi finally learns Mamoru's name and that he is a university student; to her aggravation (and supposed jealousy), Rei decides to date him. Nephrite targets the caretaker's desire to protect nature, giving him the power to have animals attack the construction workers; when this is defeated, Rei suggests a similarity between Mamoru and Tuxedo Mask.
16	13	16	"Wedding Day Blues" "A Girl's Dream: Usagi Becomes a Bride"; Transliteration: "Junpaku Doresu no Yume! Usagi Hanayome ni naru" (Japanese: 純白ドレスの夢! うさぎ花嫁になる)	Kazuhisa Takenouchi	Megumi Sugihara	Kenichi Tajiri	Masahiro Ando	27 June 1992	15 September 1995; 30 June 2014
Usagi's home economics teacher is going to get married; Nephrite implants a monster in some silk she buys, and arranges a contest for handmade wedding dresses. Usagi, Rei, and the teacher become obsessed with the contest; at the contest, the teacher transforms into a monster, but Usagi defeats it to bring him back to normal.
17	14	17	"Shutter Bugged" "Usagi's a Model: The Flash of the Monster Camera"; Transliteration: "Moderu wa Usagi? Yōma Kamera no Nessha" (Japanese: モデルはうさぎ? 妖魔カメラの熱写)	Yūji Endō	Sukehiro Tomita	Kazuyuki Hashimoto	Kazuko Tadano	4 July 1992	18 September 1995; 30 June 2014
A student from a school near Rei's is an expert photographer. Nephrite implants a monster in his camera, and he announces a modelling contest which Usagi and many other women enter. The camera and the monster have the power to trap people in photographs, but Usagi defeats it by tricking it into photographing itself in a mirror.
18	15	18	"Dangerous Dollies" "Shingo's Love: The Grieving Doll"; Transliteration: "Shingo no Junjō! Kanashimi no Furansu Ningyō" (Japanese: 進悟の純情! 哀しみのフランス人形)	Harume Kosaka	Shigeru Yanagikawa	Yoshiyuki Shikano	Ikuko Itō	11 July 1992	19 September 1995; 7 July 2014
Zoisite suggests that Nephrite needs his help, but the latter refuses, angering Beryl. Nephrite targets Shingo's friend Mika for her ability to make beautiful dolls. Sailor Moon talks to Shingo after defeating the plot, and it is established that Shingo prefers Sailor Moon to Sailor V.
19	16	19	"Who is That Masked Man?" "Usagi's Joy: A Love Letter From Tuxedo Mask"; Transliteration: "Usagi Kangeki! Takishīdo Kamen no Rabu Reta" (Japanese: うさぎ感激! タキシード仮面の恋文)	Takao Yoshizawa	Sukehiro Tomita	Minoru Ōkōchi	Akira Nakamura	25 July 1992	20 September 1995; 7 July 2014
Nephrite takes advantage of Sailor Moon's attraction to Tuxedo Mask by sending love letters to Usagi and other girls inviting them to a specific location. One of the targets is Naru, who, already attracted to his civilian disguise, goes there; Nephrite first thinks she is Sailor Moon, then drains a large amount of her life energy but is thwarted by Sailor Moon and Tuxedo Mask.
20	—	20	"The Summer, the Beach, Youth and Ghosts"; Transliteration: "Natsu yo Umi yo Seishun yo! Omake ni Yūrei mo yo" (Japanese: 夏よ海よ青春よ! おまけに幽霊もよ)	Kazuhisa Takenouchi	Megumi Sugihara	Kenichi Tajiri	Hisashi Kagawa	1 August 1992	14 July 2014; 30 August 2024
Usagi and her friends go to the beach, where they stay in a hotel run by people who dress up as film monsters. Also present are a small girl with psychic powers and her father, who hypnotises her to manifest a ghostly presence to scare the Sailors away; this backfires when the ghost attacks him, but it is defeated by the Sailors. Unusually, the Dark Kingdom is not involved in this episode.
21	17	21	"An Animated Mess" "Protect the Children's Dreams: Friendship Through Anime"; Transliteration: "Kodomodachi no Yume Mamore! Anime ni Musubu Yūjō" (Japanese: 子供達の夢守れ! アニメに結ぶ友情)	Kunihiko Ikuhara	Katsuyuki Sumisawa	Kazuyuki Hashimoto	Hiromi Matsushita & Kazuko Tadano	8 August 1992	21 September 1995; 14 July 2014
Nephrite targets one of the animators of an upcoming Sailor V film, who is driven by competition with her best friend, another animator. The Guardians investigate; Usagi and Rei are distracted by the excitement of the anime studio, but they defeat a monster anyway.
22	18	22	"Worth a Princess' Ransom" "Romance Under the Moon: Usagi's First Kiss"; Transliteration: "Gekka no Romansu! Usagi no Hatsu Kissu" (Japanese: 月下のロマンス! うさぎの初キッス)	Yūji Endō	Sukehiro Tomita	Yoshiyuki Shikano	Kiyoshi Matsumoto	15 August 1992	22 September 1995; 21 July 2014
Luna and Beryl wonder if a visiting princess could be the one the Guardians have been looking for. Mamoru dreams he is Tuxedo Mask, and a princess is asking him for the Silver Crystal. The Guardians attend a ball in the princess's honour; Nephrite attacks the princess but is defeated, and Usagi accidentally drinks wine and experiences her first kiss by Tuxedo Mask.
23	19	23	"Molly's Folly" "Wish Upon a Star: Naru's First Love"; Transliteration: "Nagare Hoshi ni Negai wo! Naru-chan no Jun'ai" (Japanese: 流れ星に願いを! なるちゃんの純愛)	Harume Kosaka	Shigeru Yanagikawa	Yoshiyuki Shikano	Masahiro Ando	22 August 1992	25 September 1995; 21 July 2014
Nephrite creates a Black Crystal that he thinks will guide him to the Silver Crystal. Usagi tries to tell Naru that the man she loves (Nephrite's civilian disguise) is evil, but Naru does not believe her, saying Usagi's jealous. Nephrite convinces Naru to steal a Silver Crystal from her mother and bring it to him.
24	20	24	"A Friend in Wolf's Clothing" "Naru's Tears: Nephrite Dies for Love"; Transliteration: "Naru-chan Gōkyū! Nefuraito Ai no Shi" (Japanese: なるちゃん号泣! ネフライト愛の死)	Junichi Sato & Takuya Igarashi	Sukehiro Tomita	Minoru Ōkōchi	Ikuko Itō	29 August 1992	26 September 1995; 28 July 2014
Nephrite does not understand that his crystal is sensing Naru's love for him; he thinks Naru must know who Sailor Moon is and tries to manipulate her into telling him. While this is futile, he manages to observe Usagi transforming, learning her identity. Zoisite has been spying on him and orchestrates Naru's kidnapping to entrap Nephrite; Nephrite, who realises he has developed affection for Naru, rescues her but is ambushed and killed by Zoisite's monsters.
25	21	25	"Jupiter Comes Thundering In" "Jupiter, the Powerful Girl in Love"; Transliteration: "Koisuru Kairiki Shōjo, Jupitā-chan" (Japanese: 恋する怪力少女、ジュピターちゃん)	Kazuhisa Takenouchi	Shigeru Yanagikawa	Kenichi Tajiri	Hisashi Kagawa	5 September 1992	27 September 1995; 28 July 2014
Beryl partially awakens the entity and supreme ruler of the Dark Kingdom, Queen Metalia, before giving Zoisite his mission to find the human reincarnations of the Seven Great Monsters to acquire their Rainbow Crystals, fragments of the Silver Crystal. Meanwhile, the tomboyish Makoto Kino transfers into Usagi's school and quickly falls for Crane-Game Joe, a crane-game whiz at the arcade who Zoisite targets and extracts the crystal from, transforming him into one of the seven monsters. Makoto is revealed to be Sailor Jupiter; Usagi gets a new attack with which she can revert the monster to human form; Zoisite escapes with the crystal.
26	22	26	"The Power of Friendship" "Restore Naru's Smile: Usagi's Friendship"; Transliteration: "Naru-chan ni Egao o! Usagi no Yūjō" (Japanese: なるちゃんに笑顔を! うさぎの友情)	Kunihiko Ikuhara	Sukehiro Tomita	Kazuyuki Hashimoto	Akira Nakamura	12 September 1992	28 September 1995; 4 August 2014
Naru is still very depressed about Nephrite's death, so Usagi and Umino take her to Yokohama to have fun. There, a kindly priest is attacked by Zoisite, transforming him into one of the seven monsters, but Tuxedo Mask takes the Rainbow Crystal from Zoisite. Mamoru realizes that he is Tuxedo Mask, and drops a locket on the ground, where Usagi finds it.
27	23	27	"Mercury's Mental Match" "Crushing on Ami: The Boy Who Can See the Future"; Transliteration: "Ami-chan e no Koi!? Mirai Yochi no Shōnen" (Japanese: 亜美ちゃんへの恋!? 未来予知の少年)	Takao Yoshizawa	Katsuyuki Sumisawa	Yoshiyuki Shikano	Masahiro Ando	10 October 1992	29 September 1995; 4 August 2014
Ami is bested in a school test by another student named Ryo Urawa, who can foresee the future and who has a crush on her. He also already knows that he is one of the Rainbow Crystal holders. When Zoisite transforms him, Ami calls on his human nature; this causes him to briefly turn on Zoisite, enabling Ami to capture the crystal.
28	24	28	"An Artful Attack" "The Painting of Love: Usagi and Mamoru Get Closer"; Transliteration: "Koi no Irasuto, Usagi to Mamoru ga Sekkin?" (Japanese: 恋のイラスト、うさぎと衛が接近?)	Yūji Endō	Megumi Sugihara	Minoru Ōkōchi	Kazuko Tadano	17 October 1992	2 October 1995; 11 August 2014
An artist, Yumemi Yumeno, asks a reluctant Usagi and Mamoru to model for one of her romantic love paintings. They encourage her to be less of a recluse. She is attacked by Zoisite and transformed. Tuxedo Mask fights Zoisite, and Sailor Moon saves him from an attack; Sailor Moon learns that the locket she found belonged to Tuxedo Mask, but Zoisite escapes with the crystal.
29	25	29	"Too Many Girlfriends" "Total Chaos: The Messy Love Rectangle"; Transliteration: "Daikonsen! Guchagucha Koi no Shikaku Kankei" (Japanese: 大混線! グチャグチャ恋の四角関係)	Harume Kosaka	Shigeru Yanagikawa	Kenichi Tajiri	Kiyoshi Matsumoto	24 October 1992	3 October 1995; 11 August 2014
Makoto, like Usagi, develops a crush on Motoki. The two decide to pursue him simultaneously, even after finding out that he has a girlfriend named Reika Nishimura. Reika is targeted by Zoisite and Kunzite and transformed; Tuxedo Mask challenges Zoisite for her Rainbow Crystal, but Zoisite escapes with it.
30	26	30	"Grandpa's Follies" "Grandpa Loses Control: Rei in Danger"; Transliteration: "Ojī-chan Ranshin, Rei-chan no Kiki" (Japanese: お爺ちゃん乱心、レイちゃんの危機)	Kazuhisa Takenouchi	Sukehiro Tomita	Kazuyuki Hashimoto	Akira Nakamura	31 October 1992	4 October 1995; 18 August 2014
Zoisite aggravates the Rainbow Crystal inside Rei's grandfather, who does not transform immediately but becomes hyperactive and emotionally unstable. A young man, Yūichirō Kumada, wanders into the shrine, falls in love with Rei, and trains under Rei's grandfather. Later, her grandfather does transform, and Zoisite captures his Rainbow Crystal.
31	27	31	"Kitty Chaos" "Loved and Chased: Luna's Worst Day Ever"; Transliteration: "Koisarete Owarete! Runa no Saiaku no Hi" (Japanese: 恋されて追われて! ルナの最悪の日)	Kunihiko Ikuhara	Katsuyuki Sumisawa	Yoshiyuki Shikano	Ikuko Itō	7 November 1992	5 October 1995; 18 August 2014
Luna is saved from feral cats by a fat domestic cat named Rhett Butler who is attracted to her. Both Zoisite and the Sailor Guardians detect traces of the last Rainbow Crystal around the home of this cat's owner, a small girl; they believe she has the crystal, but discover the cat has it. Tuxedo Mask escapes with the crystal.
32	28	32	"Tuxedo Melvin" "Umino's Resolve: I'll Protect Naru"; Transliteration: "Umino no Kesshin! Naru-chan wa Boku ga Mamoru" (Japanese: 海野の決心! なるちゃんは僕が守る)	Takao Yoshizawa	Shigeru Yanagikawa	Minoru Ōkōchi	Hisashi Kagawa	14 November 1992	6 October 1995; 25 August 2014
Luna reveals that she is from the moon, and so is the princess the guardians are looking for. Umino, having been told that Tuxedo Mask is attractive, adopts a similar persona to protect and romance Naru; when the episode's monster attacks, Zoisite threatens to kill Naru, persuading Usagi to surrender the rainbow crystal Ami captured; Umino is ineffectual, but his attempt to protect Naru impresses her.
33	29	33	"Sailor Venus Makes the Scene" "Enter Venus, the Last Sailor Guardian"; Transliteration: "Saigo no Sērā Senshi, Vīnasu Tōjō" (Japanese: 最後のセーラー戦士、ヴィーナス登場)	Yūji Endō	Megumi Sugihara	Kenichi Tajiri	Masahiro Ando	21 November 1992	9 October 1995; 25 August 2014
Zoisite disguises himself as Sailor Moon to lure Tuxedo Mask and the guardians out into the open; he stabs Tuxedo Mask, and Kunzite attacks the guardians. Sailor Venus appears and prevents Zoisite from defeating Tuxedo Mask and Kunzite from killing the guardians. Tuxedo Mask's face is revealed to Zoisite and to Queen Beryl, who orders Kunzite and Zoisite to retreat.
34	30	34	"A Crystal Clear Destiny" "The Shining Silver Crystal: The Moon Princess Appears"; Transliteration: "Hikari Kagayaku Ginsuishō! Tsuki no Purinsesu Tōjō" (Japanese: 光輝く銀水晶! 月のプリンセス登場)	Harume Kosaka	Katsuyuki Sumisawa	Kazuyuki Hashimoto	Kazuko Tadano	28 November 1992	10 October 1995; 1 September 2014
Sailor Venus introduces herself as schoolgirl Minako Aino, accompanied by Artemis, a male white cat who also can speak. Zoisite challenges Mamoru (who he now knows is Tuxedo Mask) to duel for the remaining Rainbow Crystals, but takes them by subterfuge; he then attempts to kill Mamoru and Usagi, but Usagi transforms and brings them both to safety, with their secret identities now known to each other. Zoisite then fatally injures Mamoru with more subterfuge; Usagi cries over his body, but all seven Rainbow Crystals vanish from Kunzite's possession and combine into the Silver Crystal, which Usagi, transformed into Princess Serenity, uses to save his life.
35	31	35	"A Reluctant Princess" "Returning Memories: Usagi and Mamoru's Past"; Transliteration: "Yomigaeru Kioku! Usagi to Mamoru no Kako" (Japanese: よみがえる記憶! うさぎと衛の過去)	Takuya Igarashi	Katsuyuki Sumisawa	Yoshiyuki Shikano	Akira Nakamura	5 December 1992	11 October 1995; 1 September 2014
Usagi and Mamoru remember their former lives as Moon Princess Serenity and Earth Prince Endymion. The Dark Kingdom kidnaps the injured Mamoru, but Beryl executes Zoisite for his attempt to kill him, with Kunzite remaining by Zoisite's side in his final moments. Luna and Artemis tell the Guardians about their tragic past.
36	32	36	"Bad Hair Day" "Usagi's Confusion: Is Tuxedo Mask Evil?"; Transliteration: "Usagi Konran! Takishīdo Kamen wa Aku?" (Japanese: うさぎ混乱! タキシード仮面は悪?)	Kunihiko Ikuhara	Sukehiro Tomita	Minoru Ōkōchi	Kiyoshi Matsumoto	12 December 1992	12 October 1995; 8 September 2014
Minako takes a depressed Usagi to the hairdresser to cheer her up. There they are attacked by a monster who is convinced that Minako is Sailor Moon. Tuxedo Mask appears, alive and whole, but calls himself Endymion and appears to be fighting for the Dark Kingdom.
37	33	37	"Little Miss Manners" "Let's Become a Princess: Usagi's Bizarre Training"; Transliteration: "Mezase Purinsesu? Usagi no Chin Tokkun" (Japanese: めざせプリンセス? うさぎの珍特訓)	Hiromichi Matano	Shigeru Yanagikawa	Kenichi Tajiri	Ikuko Itō	19 December 1992	13 October 1995; 8 September 2014
Usagi daydreams of her past and enrolls in a special seminar to become more like a princess. Kunzite and the evil Endymion argue about which is more important: obtaining the Silver Crystal or killing Sailor Moon.
38	34	38	"Ski Bunny Blues" "The Snow, the Mountains, Friendship and Monsters"; Transliteration: "Yuki yo Yama yo Yūjō yo! Yappari Yōma mo yo" (Japanese: 雪よ山よ友情よ! やっぱり妖魔もよ)	Takao Yoshizawa	Katsuyuki Sumisawa	Kazuyuki Hashimoto	Hisashi Kagawa	26 December 1992	16 October 1995; 15 September 2014
Yūichirō takes the girls to a ski resort, where they enter a "Moon Princess" contest. Rei and Usagi, targeted by a monster, take the opportunity to reaffirm their friendship. Tuxedo Mask continues to fight against them.
39	35	39	"The Ice Princess" "Paired with a Monster: Mako, the Ice Skating Queen"; Transliteration: "Yōma to Pea!? Hyojo no Joō Mako-chan" (Japanese: 妖魔とペア!? 氷上の女王まこちゃん)	Kazuhisa Takenouchi	Megumi Sugihara	Yoshiyuki Shikano	Kazuko Tadano	9 January 1993	17 October 1995; 15 September 2014
Discovering that the Moon Princess was once known for her graceful ice skating, Kunzite tries to use this information to trap Sailor Moon. The best skater among the girls, however, turns out to be Makoto. Tuxedo Mask appears to help them, but only works against Kunzite because he does not want to involve bystanders.
40	36	40	"The Last Resort" "The Legendary Lake Yokai: The Bond of Usagi's Family"; Transliteration: "Mizūmi no Densetsu Yōkai! Usagi Kazoku no Kizuna" (Japanese: 湖の伝説妖怪! うさぎ家族のきずな)	Harume Kosaka	Megumi Sugihara	Minoru Ōkōchi	Masahiro Ando	16 January 1993	18 October 1995; 22 September 2014
Usagi and her family go on vacation at a hot springs, where legend holds that a terrible monster was once defeated. Endymion revives the monster, but regrets his action upon discovering that it is not a monster.
41	37	41	"Tuxedo Unmask" "I Won't Run Away from Love Anymore: Ami vs. Mamoru"; Transliteration: "Mō Koi kara Nigenai! Ami to Mamoru Taiketsu" (Japanese: もう恋から逃げない! 亜美と衛対決)	Yūji Endō	Katsuyuki Sumisawa	Kenichi Tajiri	Akira Nakamura	23 January 1993	19 October 1995; 22 September 2014
Beryl orders Endymion to capture the form holders of the Rainbow Crystals, intending to reawaken the Seven Great Monsters and combine them into one huge monster to wipe out the Sailor Guardians. Ami is determined to protect Urawa while Sailor Moon tries to heal Endymion from brainwashing.
42	—	42	"Sailor Venus' Past: Minako's Tragic Love"; Transliteration: "Sērā Vīnasu no Kako, Minako no Hiren" (Japanese: S(セーラー)ヴィーナスの過去、美奈子の悲恋)	Takuya Igarashi	Sukehiro Tomita	Kazuyuki Hashimoto	Kiyoshi Matsumoto	30 January 1993	29 September 2014; 15 November 2024
The Guardians look for an entrance to the Dark Kingdom, where Metalia will soon be awakened. Kunzite decides to try to get at Sailor V and attacks a woman Minako had been good friends with in England.
43	38	43	"Fractious Friends" "Usagi Abandoned: The Falling-Out of the Sailor Guardians"; Transliteration: "Usagi ga Koritsu? Sērā Senshi-tachi no Ogenka" (Japanese: うさぎが孤立? S(セーラー)戦士達の大ゲンカ)	Kazuhisa Takenouchi	Shigeru Yanagikawa	Yoshiyuki Shikano	Katsumi Tamegai	6 February 1993	20 October 1995; 29 September 2014
The Sailor Guardians stage a breakup, trying to make it look as though Sailor Moon has defected so that she can infiltrate the Dark Kingdom and save Endymion. She and Sailor Mars find it a little too easy to fight.
44	39	44	"The Past Returns" "Usagi's Awakening: A Message from the Distant Past"; Transliteration: "Usagi no Kakusei! Chōkako no Messēji" (Japanese: うさぎの覚醒! 超過去のメッセージ)	Takao Yoshizawa	Sukehiro Tomita	Minoru Ōkōchi	Hisashi Kagawa	13 February 1993	23 October 1995; 6 October 2014
A blast of energy sends the Guardians to the ruined Moon Kingdom, where they meet a hologram of Queen Serenity and learn about their past. Luna and Artemis finally find the entrance to the Dark Kingdom. Kunzite attacks, but is finally defeated by Sailor Moon.
45	40a	45	"The Day of Destiny" "Death of the Sailor Guardians: The Tragic Final Battle"; Transliteration: "Sērā Senshi Shisu! Hisō naru Saishūsen" (Japanese: セーラー戦士死す! 悲壮なる最終戦)	Kōnosuke Uda	Shigeru Yanagikawa	Kenichi Tajiri	Ikuko Itō	20 February 1993	24 October 1995; 6 October 2014
The Sailor Guardians travel to D-Point to fight Beryl, where they face their toughest monsters yet, the DD Girls, with Sailor Moon heartbroken over her friends sacrificing themselves so she can proceed into the Dark Kingdom.
46	40b	46	"Brand New Life" "Usagi's Eternal Wish: A Brand New Life"; Transliteration: "Usagi no Omoi wa Towa ni! Atarashiki Tensei" (Japanese: うさぎの想いは永遠に! 新しき転生)	Kunihiko Ikuhara	Sukehiro Tomita	Kazuyuki Hashimoto	Kazuko Tadano	27 February 1993	24 October 1995; 13 October 2014
With her friends' sacrifice, Sailor Moon is transported inside the Dark Kingdom to face Beryl and the now brainwashed Endymion. Usagi tries to use Moon Tiara Action, then Moon Healing Escalation on Endymion, but both fail, so she shows Endymion the locket, which heals him from the brainwashing. After that, Beryl gets even angrier than ever and tries to kill Sailor Moon, but Endymion protects Sailor Moon and is wounded to death by shards of glass, and Beryl, who is mortally injured by Endymion, is possessed by Metalia, who turns her host into a giant monster that Sailor Moon fights in her Princess Serenity form. With the spirits of the Inner Guardians by her side, Serenity defeats Metalia and finally destroys all the traces of Metalia at the cost of her own life. But the Silver Crystal resonates with Usagi's dying thoughts, reviving everyone with their memories altered so they can all live normal lives. Only Artemis and Luna retained memories of the events.

== Home media release ==
=== Japanese ===
==== VHS ====
Toei Video (Japan, VHS)
Volume		Episodes	Release date	Ref.
美少女戦士セーラームーン	1	1–4	18 December 1992	
美少女戦士セーラームーン	2	5–8	25 March 1993	
美少女戦士セーラームーン	3	9–12	25 July 1993	
美少女戦士セーラームーン	4	13–16	25 August 1993	
美少女戦士セーラームーン	5	17–20	25 November 1993	
美少女戦士セーラームーン	6	21–24	17 December 1993	
美少女戦士セーラームーン	7	25–28	25 January 1994	
美少女戦士セーラームーン	8	29–32	25 February 1994	
美少女戦士セーラームーン	9	33–36	21 March 1994	
美少女戦士セーラームーン	10	37–40	21 April 1994	
美少女戦士セーラームーン	11	41–44	21 May 1994	
美少女戦士セーラームーン	12	45–46	21 June 1994	

==== DVD ====
Toei Video (Japan, Region 2 DVD)
Volume		Episodes	Release date	Ref.
美少女戦士セーラームーン	1	1–6	21 May 2002	
美少女戦士セーラームーン	2	7–12	21 May 2002	
美少女戦士セーラームーン	3	13–18	21 May 2002	
美少女戦士セーラームーン	4	19–24	21 June 2002	
美少女戦士セーラームーン	5	25–30	21 June 2002	
美少女戦士セーラームーン	6	31–36	21 June 2002	
美少女戦士セーラームーン	7	37–41	21 July 2002	
美少女戦士セーラームーン	8	42–46	21 July 2002	
美少女戦士セーラームーン DVD COLLECTION	1	1–24	11 December 2009	
美少女戦士セーラームーン DVD COLLECTION	2	25–46	21 January 2010	

==== Blu-ray ====
Toei Video (Japan, Region A)
Volume	Episodes	Release date	Ref.
美少女戦士セーラームーン Blu-ray COLLECTION VOL.1	1–23	4 June 2017	
美少女戦士セーラームーン Blu-ray COLLECTION VOL.2	24–46	9 August 2017	

=== English ===
==== VHS ====
===== United States =====
Buena Vista Home Video/DIC Toon-Time Video
Volume	Episodes	Release date	Stock Number	Ref.
Sailor Moon: A Moon Star Is Born	1, 3 (1–2 edited)	11 March 1997	6145	
Sailor Moon: Scouts Unite!	8, 10 (5, 7 edited)	11 March 1997	6146	
Sailor Moon: Evil Eyes	12, 17 (9, 14 edited)	18 March 1997	6148	
Sailor Moon: Jupiter and Venus Arrive!	25, 33 (21, 29 edited)	30 April 1997	10422	
Sailor Moon: Secret Identities	34–36 (30–31 edited)	30 April 1997	10423	
Sailor Moon: Good Queen, Bad Queen	44–46 (39–40 edited)	30 April 1997	10424	

ADV Films
Volume	Episodes	Release date	Stock Number	Ref.
Volume 1: The Legend Begins	1, 3–4, 7 (1–4 edited)	21 November 2000	707303	
Volume 2: The Power of Friendship	8–11 (5–8 edited)	21 November 2000	707743	
Volume 3: Sailor Mars Joins the Battle	12–15 (9–12 edited)	9 January 2001	707313	
Volume 4: Mysterious Tuxedo Mask	16–19 (13–16 edited)	9 January 2001	707753	
Volume 5: Red Hearts & Silver Crystals	21–24 (17–20 edited)	13 February 2001	707343	
Volume 6: Introducing Sailor Jupiter	25–28 (21–24 edited)	13 February 2001	707783	
Volume 7: Green Eyed Monsters	29–32 (25–28 edited)	1 May 2001	707353	
Volume 8: And in This Corner... Sailor Venus!	33–36 (29–32 edited)	1 May 2001	707793	
Volume 9: Field Trips	37–40 (33–36 edited)	3 July 2001	707363	
Volume 10: Trials And Troubles!	41, 43–46 (37–40 edited)	3 July 2001	707803	

===== United Kingdom =====
MVM Films
Volume	Episodes	Release date	Ref.
Episodes 1 & 2	1, 3 (1–2 edited)	12 November 2001	
Episodes 3 & 4	4, 7 (3–4 edited)	12 November 2001	
Episodes 5 & 6	8–9 (5–6 edited)	27 December 2001	
Episodes 7 & 8	10–11 (7–8 edited)	22 April 2002	
Episodes 9 & 10	12–13 (9–10 edited)	22 April 2002	
Episodes 11 & 12	14–15 (11–12 edited)	10 March 2003	
Episodes 13–18	16–19, 21–22 (13–18 edited)	21 April 2003	
Episodes 19–24	23–28 (19–24 edited)	2 June 2003	

===== Australia =====
Network Entertainment
Volume	Episodes	Release date	Stock Number	Ref.
Sailor Moon: A Moon Star Is Born	1–3 (1–3 edited)	1997	NW1144	
Sailor Moon: Computer School Blues	4–6 (4–6 edited)	1997	NW1145	
Sailor Moon: Nightmare In Dreamland	7–9 (7–9 edited)	1997	NW1146	
Sailor Moon: Fight To The Finish	10–12 (10–12 edited)	1997	NW1198	
Sailor Moon: Dangerous Dollies	13–15 (13–15 edited)	1997	NW1199	
Sailor Moon: Who Is That Masked Man?	16–18 (16–18 edited)	1997	NW1200	

==== DVD ====
===== United States =====
ADV Films (Region 1)
Volume	Episodes	Release date	Ref.
A Heroine Is Chosen	1, 3–4, 7–9 (1–6 edited)	16 April 2002	
Sailor Scouts to the Rescue!	10–15 (7–12 edited)	16 April 2002	
The Man in the Tuxedo Mask	16–19, 21–22 (13–18 edited)	11 June 2002	
The Secret of the Sailor Scouts	23–28 (19–24 edited)	11 June 2002	
Introducing Sailor Venus!	29–34 (25–30 edited)	23 July 2002	
Adventure Girls!	35–40 (31–36 edited)	23 July 2002	
Fight to the Finish!	41, 43–48 (37–42 edited)	3 September 2002	
Season One, Complete and Uncut	1–46	15 July 2003	

Viz Media (Region 1)
Volume	Episodes	Release date	Ref.
Season 1 Part 1	1–23	11 November 2014	
Season 1 Part 2	24–46	10 February 2015	

===== United Kingdom =====
MVM Films (Region 2)
Volume	Episodes	Release date	Ref.
Episodes 1–6	1, 3–4, 7–9 (1–6 edited)	24 February 2003	
Episodes 7–12	10–15 (7–12 edited)	4 October 2004	
Episodes 13–18	16–19, 21–22 (13–18 edited)	8 November 2004	
Episodes 19–24	23–28 (19–24 edited)	4 October 2004	
Episodes 25–30	29–34 (25–30 edited)	4 October 2004	
Episodes 31–36	35–40 (31–36 edited)	4 October 2004	
Episodes 37–42	41, 43–48 (37–42 edited)	4 October 2004	
Series 1	1, 3–4, 7–19, 21–41, 43–48 (1–42 edited)	11 October 2004	

===== Australia and New Zealand =====
Madman Entertainment (Region 4)
Volume	Episodes	Release date	Ref.
Part 1	1–24	2 December 2015	
Part 2	25–46	10 February 2016	
Volume 1: Usagi's Beautiful Transformation	1–6	2 December 2015	
Volume 2: The Girl Genius	7–12	2 December 2015	
Volume 3: Girls Unite	13–18	2 March 2016	
Volume 4: A Love Letter from Tuxedo Mask	19–24	2 March 2016	
Volume 5: Jupiter, the Powerful Girl in Love	25–30	6 July 2016	
Volume 6: Enter Venus, the Last Sailor Guardian	31–35	6 July 2016	
Volume 7: Friendship and Monsters	36–41	7 December 2016	
Volume 8: Usagi's Awakening	42–46	7 December 2016	
Complete Season 1	1–46	6 December 2017	
Moon Prism Power Collection	1–24	6 June 2018	
Moon Prism Power Collection 2	25–46	6 June 2018	

==== Blu-ray + DVD combo ====
===== North America =====
Viz Media (Region A)
Volume	Episodes	Release date	Ref.
Season 1 Part 1	1–23	11 November 2014	
Season 1 Part 2	24–46	10 February 2015	
Complete First Season [Blu-ray only]	1–46	14 June 2022	

===== Australia and New Zealand =====
Madman Entertainment (Region B)
Volume	Episodes	Release date	Ref.
Complete Season 1	1–46	6 December 2017	
