= Knuckle Bash =

1993 video game

- Japanese arcade flyer
- Developer: Toaplan
- Publishers: JP: Toaplan; NA/EU: Atari Games
- Designers: Junya Inoue; Nanpei Kaneko
- Composers: Masahiro Yuge; Osamu Ōta
- Platform: Arcade
- Release: NA: March 1993; JP: June 1993
- Genre: Beat 'em up
- Modes: Single-player, multiplayer

Knuckle Bash (Note: Japanese: ナックルバッシュ, Hepburn: Nakkuru Basshu) is a 1993 beat 'em up video game developed and published by Toaplan for Japanese arcades; in North America and Europe, it was distributed by Atari Games. It is notable for being one of the few titles by Toaplan that has not received any official port to home consoles as of date.

In the game, players assume the role of professional wrestlers fighting against the Mad Bull Group organization to protect wrestling from corruption. Knuckle Bash was created by most of the same staff that previously worked on several projects at Toaplan and who would later go on to work at one of its offshoots after the company declared bankruptcy in 1994. The team were originally commissioned on making a fighting game similar to Capcom's Street Fighter II: The World Warrior but the project deviated from its original plan and became a beat 'em up title instead. As of 2019, the rights to the title are owned by Tatsujin, a company founded in 2017 by former Toaplan member Masahiro Yuge and now-affiliate of Japanese arcade manufacturer exA-Arcadia alongside many other Toaplan IPs.

== Gameplay ==
Gameplay screenshot

Knuckle Bash is a side-scrolling beat 'em up game similar to Final Fight and Double Dragon. Players take control of one of the available playable characters across ten stages, each one set in a different location, and fight against an assortment of enemies and villains in order to defeat the Mad Bull Group organization. At the beginning, players choose between one of two scenarios, both of which host their own set of stages and clearing certain scenarios unlocks an extra playable character. Unlike other titles in the same genre, the stages in the game chiefly consist of various waves of single or few strong boss-like enemies, instead of the typical long series of weaker enemies with a boss at the end of the stage. It also completely lacks weapons or objects of any sort. Similar to Streets of Rage 2, each character has a special attack of their own that deals damage to any enemy on-screen. Players can compete in a minigame reminiscent of Mortal Kombat's "Test Your Might" segments between stages.

== Synopsis ==
=== Plot ===
The story of Knuckle Bash revolves around the Mad Bull Group, a corrupt wrestling organization that profits and taints the reputation of the sport, whose wrestlers are looked upon by children as role models. Three former members of the Mad Bull Group who defected from the Mad Bull Group organization due to their actions and had been labeled as traitors arranged a secret meeting at a Chicago hotel in order to contact a skillful "Ninpow" master, who is also wanted by the Mad Bull Group. On their journey, the wrestlers venture into the Battle Kingdom headquarters, where another former Mad Bull Group member plans to defect from the organization because of their actions. After facing off in multiple battles against the members of the Mad Bull Group, the wrestlers manage to dismantle the organization and their victorious story was widespread thereafter.

=== Characters ===
Players initially choose from three wrestlers at the start, while two extra wrestlers are recruited through gameplay and any of the five wrestlers can be switched to between missions:

- El Plancha (Note: Known as Clash in the Atari Games version.) – a luchador.
- Michael Sobut (Note: Known as Dice in the Atari Games version.) – an Elvis Presley look-alike.
- Jack Brow (Note: Known as Devo in the Atari Games version.) – a street fighter.
- Mr. Hayate – a ninja master of the "Ninpow" art.
- Captain (Note: Kyaputen (キャプテン)) – an american football player who defects from the Mad Bull Group.

== Development and release ==
Knuckle Bash was created by most of the same staff that previously worked on several projects at Toaplan and who would later go on to work at one of its offshoots after the company declared bankruptcy in 1994. Mangaka Junya Inoue acted as designer in the project, while the soundtrack was co-composed by Masahiro Yuge and Osamu Ōta. According to Inoue, the game was also designed by Nanpei Kaneko, a member who previously worked on FixEight before quitting Toaplan and working as illustrator for Japanese magazines. Between 2009 and 2012 through Japanese publications such as Shooting Gameside, former Toaplan composer Tatsuya Uemura recounted the project's development process and history, stating that the team were originally commissioned by the company on making a fighting game similar to Street Fighter II: The World Warrior, but the project deviated from its original plan and became a beat 'em up title instead, although Uemura claimed he had no involvement during its development.

Knuckle Bash was released in arcades worldwide by Toaplan and Atari Games in 1993. An album containing music from the title and other Toaplan games was published exclusively in Japan by City Connection under their Clarice Disk label in June 2018. Prior to launch, the game was first showcased to the public at the 1993 AOU Show. As of March 2014, it has not received a conversion to home consoles.

However, the game is one of the emulated titles included in the Toaplan Arcade 4 cartridge for Evercade, released in December 2024, which marks the first time it is available officially and legally to play on a video game console.

== Reception and legacy ==
Play Meter listed Knuckle Bash as the twenty-seventh most popular arcade game of July 1993. Maurizio Miccoli of Italian magazine Computer+Videogiochi noted the game's combination of Final Fight-style gameplay and wrestling thematic. Nick Zverloff of Hardcore Gaming 101 stated that Knuckle Bash "might not be fantastic, but it gets by on being an average beat em up that is just ridiculous enough to make it enjoyable". Retro Gamer's Nick Thorpe gave it a mixed outlook. Wireframe regarded it as "a rare foray into brawler territory" for Toaplan. A year after the game's launch, Inoue would later join Gazelle, one of Toaplan's offshoots after the company declared bankruptcy in 1994 and act as graphic artist for 1995's Pretty Soldier Sailor Moon, which was based upon Naoko Takeuchi's Sailor Moon shōjo manga and anime series. A bootleg version of the game titled Knuckle Bash 2 was released in 1999, featuring many changes compared to the original release. In more recent years, the rights to the title and many other IPs from Toaplan are now owned by Tatsujin, a company named after Truxton's Japanese title that was founded in 2017 by former Toaplan employee Masahiro Yuge, and is part of Embracer Group since 2022.
