= Air Gallet =

1996 video game

- Developers: Gazelle exA-Arcadia (EXA Label)
- Publishers: Banpresto exA-Arcadia (EXA Label)
- Director: Tatsuya Uemura
- Producer: Johan Sato
- Designer: Junya Inoue
- Programmer: Mizuiro Honey
- Artists: Kaneyo Ohira; Mikio Yamaguchi
- Composer: Yoshitatsu Sakai
- Platform: Arcade
- Release: WW: February 1996
- Genre: Vertical-scrolling shooter
- Modes: Single-player, multiplayer

Air Gallet (Note: Known in Japan as Aku Gallet (Japanese: アクウギャレット, Hepburn: Akū Gyarreto).) is a 1996 vertical-scrolling shooter arcade game published by Banpresto. Players control a fighter jet through six levels to put a stop to coups in Japan and Germany that are being supported by a German cult. Its gameplay involves destroying waves of enemies, picking up power-ups and new weapons, and destroying bosses.

Air Gallet was developed by Gazelle, an off-shoot of defunct developer Toaplan. It was directed by Tatsuya Uemura and designed by Junya Inoue, who wanted it to have a more boisterous presentation compared to his previous works. Gazelle's financial difficulties and strict time schedules forced its development to be hastily rushed. The game was released to mixed reviews; while its graphics and sprite layering techniques were praised, critics felt that it wasn't as polished or innovative as other, similar games were. Inoue has since expressed his disappointment in its quality.

In 2025, exA-Arcadia released Airgallet EXA Label as the fifth title in the EXA Label series.

== Gameplay ==
Gameplay screenshot

Air Gallet is a vertical-scrolling shooter game, with its gameplay being similar to titles like Raiden (1990). Its plot involves a coup by Blue Star, a faction of the JSDF. The players take the role of Keiichiro Tojo and Johnny Glover, fighter pilots among the opposing military forces, who are sent out to stop first them, then a similar coup in Germany, and finally the cult backing the coups.

Players traverse through six automatically scrolling stages, set in locations such as harbors, forests, and Tokyo Tower. The objective is to make it to the end by destroying waves of enemies and avoiding projectiles. Each level concludes in a boss fight against an enemy aircraft. Players can upgrade their fighter jet by collecting four matching power capsules. Weapons include a laser, a support drone, homing missiles, machine guns, and a spread shot. Each weapon can be upgraded four times; should the player die, their weapon level reverts to zero. Players can also pick up star-shaped medals that cycle through different point values, and two varieties of smart bombs that either clear the screen of enemies or provide a focused, narrow attack.

== Development and release ==
Air Gallet was developed by Gazelle, a company established by former Toaplan employees after the latter's bankruptcy in 1994. It was designed by Junya Inoue, who had worked on titles such as Batsugun (1993), and directed by Tatsuya Uemura. It features the voice work of Lenne Hardt and Jeff Manning. Inoue wanted Air Gallet to be different from his previous projects, with a more "loud" and boisterous presentation, but Gazelle's severe financial difficulties and strict deadlines prevented him from being able to design it exactly how he wanted. Inoue himself created most of the game's backdrops, such as the Tokyo-themed area in the second level. Development was hastily rushed to meet deadline, giving the team little time to finetune its difficulty balance and mechanics.

Air Gallet was published by Banpresto, a subsidiary of Bandai that focused primarily on games with licensed anime characters. Banpresto had worked with Gazelle on an arcade adaptation of Pretty Soldier Sailor Moon a year prior, which gave the two companies a solid business relationship. The game was released in February 1996, being titled Aku Gallet in Japan. After launch, the title was showcased to attendees at the 1996 AOU Show. After its release, Inoue and other employees left Gazelle to join Cave.

== Reception ==
A writer for Consoles Plus wrote that Air Gallet had little to offer in terms of innovation. Outside of its impressive graphics and backdrops, they felt its gameplay was nothing new compared to other shooters, but that the game itself was decent. Inoue has expressed his disappointment in the game's quality, going as far as to say it bordered on being a kusoge.

Retro Gamer's Ryan Lambie was quick to point out similarities between Air Gallet and Raiden, specifically its similar fighter craft designs and power-up system. Lambie complemented the game's detailed backdrops, sprite layering techniques, and humorous voice-overs. While Lambie noted its high difficulty level, he showed appreciation for its forgiveness towards newer players. Overall, Lambie described Air Gallet as being "an intense, excellently-crafted shooter". Nick Zverloff of Hardcore Gaming 101 found the overall look of the game to be lacking compared to Toaplan's offerings, writing that aside from its voice-over clips it "looks like another faceless shooter". He enjoyed the game's level design for their obtuse-looking themes, and felt some of the backdrops possessed some impressive sprite layering techniques. Zverloff concluded that Air Gallet was an impressive game, but lacked the polish that similar shooters from Toaplan and Cave featured.
