= Otogi Matsuri: Dark Offering =

Japanese manga series

- The first volume of Otogi Matsuri: Dark Offering, published by Central Park Media

おとぎ奉り (Otogi Matsuri)
- Genre: Action, Supernatural
- Manga
- Written by: Junya Inoue
- Published by: Wani Books (1st edition); Shinchosha (2nd edition)
- English publisher: NA: Central Park Media
- Magazine: Comic Gum
- Original run: 2002 – 2008
- Volumes: 12 (Gum Comics edition); 8 (Bunch Comics DX edition)

Otogi Matsuri: Dark Offering (おとぎ奉り) is a Japanese manga written and illustrated by Junya Inoue. It has been serialized by Wani Books in Comic Gum from 2002, and collected in 12 tankōbon volumes released from December, 2002 to September 23, 2008. The series is licensed in North America by Central Park Media and in France by Doki-Doki.

== Plot ==
The series follows Yousuke Suruga, a high school student, whose body has been merged with the Bow of Suzaku, a legendary weapon, for breaking an ancient Shinto shrine. To save himself and his hometown he uses the Bow of Suzaku against demons.

== Characters ==
Suruga Yousuke - is the main character of the story and wielder of bow of suzaku. He unknowingly sacrificed his future for the bow therefore he has only one year to live.

Yomogi Inaba - is the female lead who can see sprits and is protected by the fox sprits.

== Manga ==
Otogi Matsuri: Dark Offering written and illustrated by Junya Inoue. It has been serialized by Wani Books in Comic Gum from 2002. The individual chapters were collected in 12 tankōbon volumes which were released from December, 2002 to September 23, 2008. The series is licensed in North America by Central Park Media, which released its first tankōbon volume on September 1, 2007. They released three volumes before going defunct. The manga is licensed in France by Doki-Doki, which released the first tankōbon volume on October 11, 2006, and the last on September 16, 2009.

No.	Title	Original release date	North America release date
1	Dark Offering	December, 2002; 978-4-847-03437-4	September 1, 2007; 978-1-578-00727-1
2	Blood Rites	March, 2003; 978-4-847-03448-0	January 1, 2008; 978-1-578-00730-1
3	—	December 25, 2003; 978-4-847-03461-9	May 1, 2008; 978-1-578-00746-2
4	—	June 24, 2004; 978-4-847-03476-3	—
5	—	February, 2005; 978-4-847-03492-3	—
6	—	June 25, 2005; 978-4-847-03511-1	—
7	—	January, 2006; 978-4-847-03541-8	—
8	—	August 25, 2006; 978-4-847-03566-1	—
9	—	January 25, 2007; 978-4-847-03589-0	—
10	—	September 22, 2007; 978-4-847-03613-2	—
11	—	February 22, 2008; 978-4-847-03628-6	—
12	—	September 23, 2008; 978-4-847-03653-8	—
