= Bishōjo Senshi Sailor Moon R (1993 video game) =

1993 video game

- Developer: Angel
- Publisher: Bandai
- Producer: Jōji Yuno
- Artist: "Kumata"
- Composer: Vince DiCola
- Series: Sailor Moon
- Platform: Super Famicom
- Release: JP: 29 December 1993
- Genre: Beat 'em up
- Modes: Single-player, multiplayer

Bishōjo Senshi Sailor Moon R (Note: Japanese: 美少女戦士セーラームーンR, Hepburn: Bishōjo Senshi Sērā Mūn Āru; lit. "Pretty Soldier Sailor Moon R") is a side-scrolling beat 'em up video game developed by Angel and published by Bandai in Japan on December 29, 1993. It is the third game to be created by Angel based upon Naoko Takeuchi's Sailor Moon shōjo manga and anime series, as well as the second title in the franchise for Super Famicom, serving as the sequel to Sailor Moon.

Following the second season of the anime series, which adapted the second arc of the manga, the players control one of the six Sailor Guardians and fight against enemies across several locations in order to protect Earth from both the Hell Tree aliens led by Ail and Ann as well as the Black Moon Clan led by Prince Demand, who are attempting to steal life energy from humans and the Star Points of future Crystal Tokyo. Like its predecessor, the game was met with mixed reception from critics since its release.

== Gameplay ==
Gameplay screenshot.

As with its predecessor, Bishōjo Senshi Sailor Moon R is a side-scrolling beat 'em up game where players take control either of the five original Sailor Soldiers across various stages, each one set in a different location, and fight against an assortment of enemies and villains from the series in order to defeat the Hell Tree aliens and the Black Moon Clan.

Each Soldier has a special attack of their own that deals damage to all enemies on-screen at once by charging it. Each Soldier also has different attributes during gameplay, encouraging players to select their preferred character. A new addition to the sequel is the ability to play as Chibiusa in her own game mode. Another addition is a versus fighting game mode, where players choose between any Sailor Senshi and fight against other opponents in one-on-one matches and the fighter who manages to deplete the health bar of the opponent wins the bout.

== Development and release ==
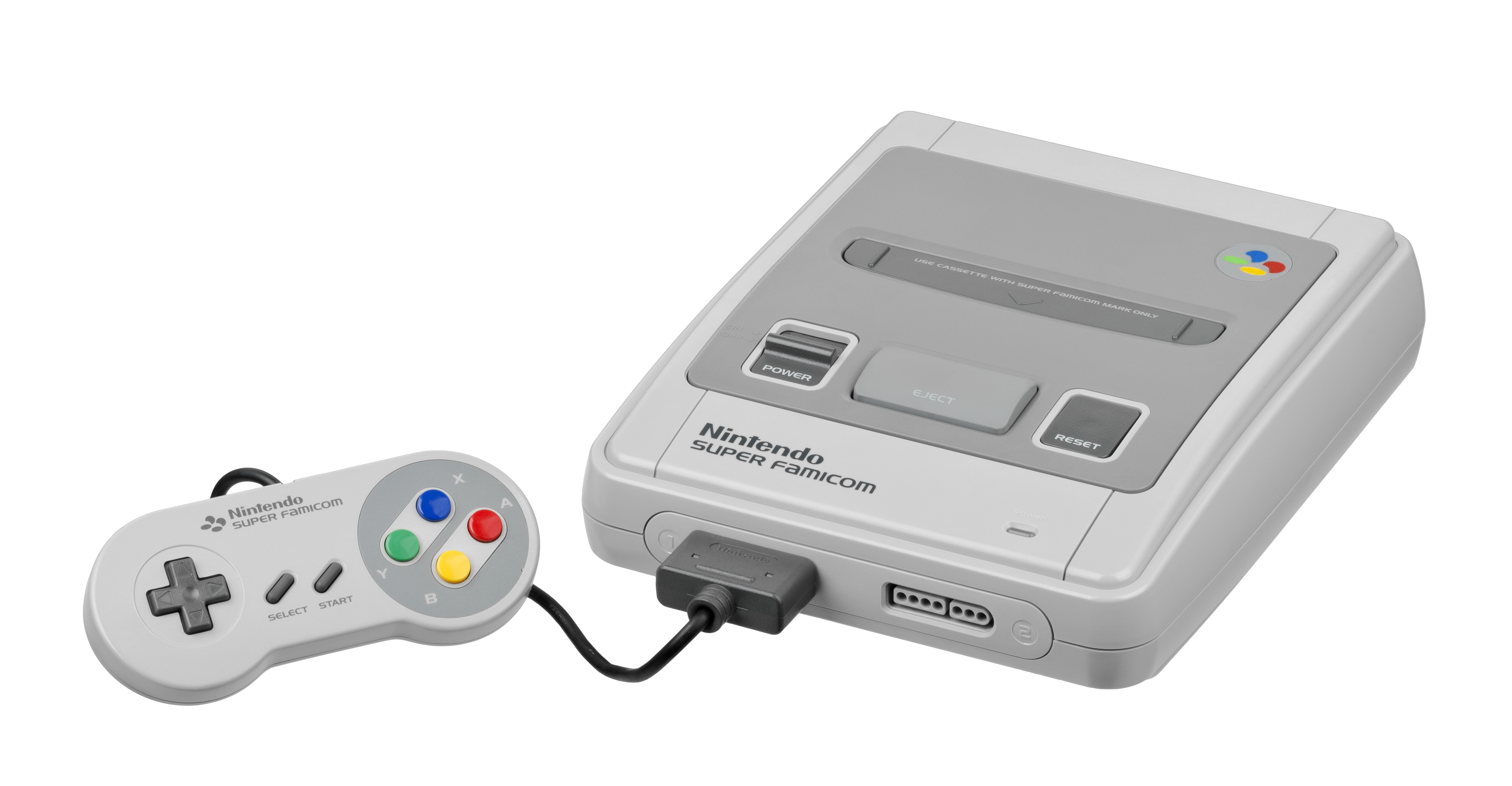
Bishōjo Senshi Sailor Moon R was developed by most of the original team who worked in the previous Sailor Moon title exclusively for Super Famicom.

Bishōjo Senshi Sailor Moon R on Super Famicom, which was released exclusively in Japan by Bandai on December 29, 1993, was once again created by a team comprised from staff of the titular shōjo manga and anime series, with producer Jōji Yuno at Angel heading development, who recounted its making process and history in an official strategy guide by Kodansha from May 1994, five months after the game's release to the market. Yuno claimed that the "Chibiusa" mode, which was geared towards a much younger audience, grew beyond the staff's expectation and stated that there were still mysteries behind Chibiusa's character and decided removing her from the main game and create a separate mode instead after the team were worried and debated how she should be implemented in the project, as they thought Chibiusa getting attacked by enemies would not look right due to her height. The team decided to introduce the parasol Chibiusa had since her appearance as a weapon, stating that this made up for her difference with enemies' height and was "a lot cuter than Chibiusa directly punching and kicking the enemies." However, the parasol shoots energy stars instead when attacking enemies, as Yuno claimed that "from the point of view of child-rearing, it's not ideal to be hitting enemies directly with an umbrella".

In regards to the Sailor Soldiers, Yuno stated it was difficult to conceive new moves as the team previously struggled to come up with attack moves during development of their previous Sailor Moon release but were able to implement moves that were initially scrapped due to memory space constrains, however characters such as Sailor Venus had her moveset slightly altered. Yuno also stated that the game's special attack that damages enemies onscreen had just barely debuted in the anime series and was borrowed for the project. However, Yuno claimed that the reasons for conceiving the joint attack moves used in co-op play was because of hardware issued when using the screen-clearing attack and "add meaning" in the two-player mode, as the team did not wanted co-op play to be just two players in the single-player mode. Yuno also claimed the team was happy with their ability to implement multiple hidden moves, among other elements.

The team at Angel also made enemies stronger, with some being lifted from the original manga, however some characters like Esmeraude had their moveset rearranged prior to launch. The team also added a two-player versus fighting mode, as the team originally planned to implement a fighting game mode in their previous Sailor Moon release but were unable to do so, due to the increased memory space capacity. Despite the increased memory space, however, various elements were ultimately dropped such as Sailor Pluto being a playable character in both single-player and two-player versus modes. Angel requested Takanori Arisawa to reprise his role as composer, scoring an original arrangement of Moonlight Densetsu for the game, while art director "Kumata" was responsible for the hand-drawn backgrounds. Yuno also revealed that a woman was in charge of the visuals, stating that a "woman's sense was added to how the action was being shown on screen".

== Release and reception ==
Reception

Review scores
Publication	Score
Famitsu	7/10, 6/10, 7/10, 6/10
Consoles +	84%
Joypad	40%
Super Console	71/100

Bishōjo Senshi Sailor Moon R was released in Japan for the Super Famicom on December 29, 1993.

Bishōjo Senshi Sailor Moon R was met with mixed critical reception from reviewers. Animerica's Sergei Shimkevich gave the game a positive outlook. Electronic Gaming Monthly stated that "This bizarre cart is a cool game that everyone will like." Bruno Sol of Spanish magazine Superjuegos praised the presentation. Spanish publication Minami commended the addition of a fighting game mode. Argentinian website Malditos Nerds ranked it as number five on their top Sailor Moon games.
