= Sailor Moon (1993 video game) =

1993 video game

- French Super NES cover art
- Developer: Angel (Note: Ported to Sega Mega Drive by Arc System Works and TNS)
- Publishers: JP: Angel; EU: Bandai
- Producer: Jōji Yuno
- Artists: Kazuko Tadano; Naoko Takeuchi; Yukihiro Kitano
- Composer: Takanori Arisawa
- Series: Sailor Moon
- Platforms: SNES, Sega Mega Drive
- Release: SNES: JP: 27 August 1993; EU: November 1994; Mega Drive: JP: 8 July 1994
- Genre: Beat 'em up
- Modes: Single-player, multiplayer

Sailor Moon (Note: Also known as Pretty Soldier Sailor Moon (Japanese: 美少女 戦士 セーラー ムーン, Hepburn: Bishōjo Senshi Sērā Mūn) in Japan.) is a side-scrolling beat 'em up video game originally developed and released by Angel in Japan on August 27, 1993 and later in France and Spain in November 1994 by Bandai for the Super Nintendo Entertainment System. It is the second game to be created by Angel based upon Naoko Takeuchi's Sailor Moon shōjo manga and anime series, the first for the Super NES and one of the few Sailor Moon titles that had an official international release.

Following the first season of the anime series, which adapted the first arc of the manga, the players control one of the five original Inner Sailor Guardians and fight against enemies across several locations in order to protect Earth from the Dark Kingdom, a group of antagonists led by Queen Beryl who previously destroyed the ancient Moon Kingdom as they attempt to steal life energy from humans and the Silver Crystal to free Queen Metaria from her imprisonment. Due to the success of Sailor Moon for Game Boy in Japan, Angel wanted to develop a project for the Super NES with the aim to appeal towards fans of the series. The title was later ported to the Sega Mega Drive, featuring various changes compared to the original SNES version.

Sailor Moon was met with mixed reception from critics since its release on both SNES and Mega Drive. A sequel, Bishōjo Senshi Sailor Moon R, was released later in 1993 by Bandai exclusively for the SNES.

== Gameplay ==
SNES version screenshot.

Sailor Moon is a side-scrolling beat 'em up game where players take control either of the five original Sailor Soldiers across various stages, each one set in a different location, and fight against an assortment of enemies and villains from the series in order to defeat Queen Beryl and the Dark Kingdom. Each Soldier has a special attack of their own that deals damage to all enemies on-screen at once by charging it. Unlike other titles based on the franchise, most of the fighting is physical rather than magical. The Soldiers can punch, kick, and throw enemies. Each Soldier also has different attributes during gameplay, encouraging players to select their preferred character.

== Development and release ==
Sailor Moon on Super NES was created by a team comprised from staff of the titular shōjo manga and anime series, with producer Jōji Yuno at Angel heading development, who recounted its making process and history in an official strategy guide by Kodansha from December 1993, four months after the game's release to the market. Kazuko Tadano, Naoko Takeuchi and Toei Animation artist Yukihiro Kitano were responsible for illustration, original youma designs and character animations respectively. The soundtrack was composed by Takanori Arisawa, who also served as music director of the anime series.

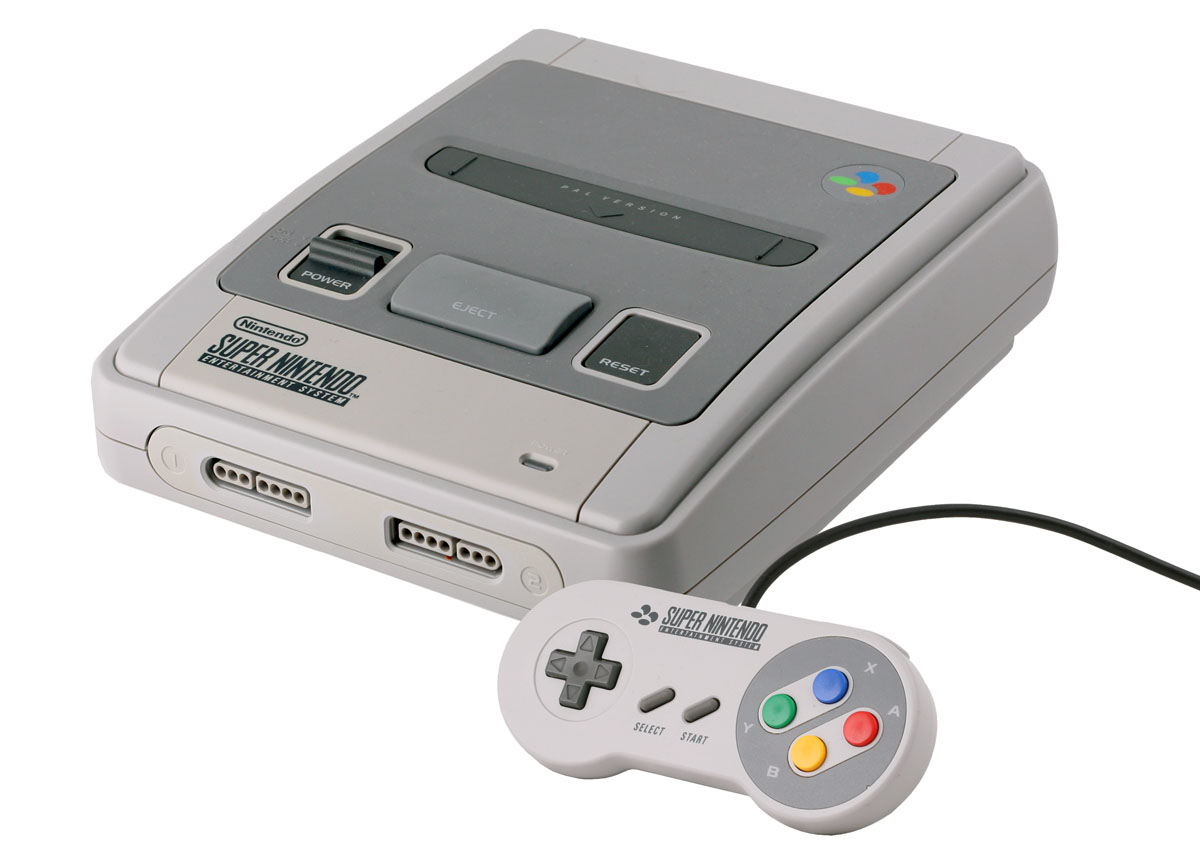
Sailor Moon for Super NES was developed by Angel in response to the success of their previous Game Boy release.

Yuno stated that Sailor Moon for the Super NES was created in response to the commercial success their previous title on Game Boy in Japan, as the Super NES hardware imposed less restrictions than the Game Boy and Angel wanted to developed a Sailor Moon for the console. The team desired to have a game that would be enjoyed by all fans and meet expectations from those who liked the characters, prompting the involvement of staff members from both the manga and anime series. Yuno was introduced to Kitano, who created the hand-drawn animation work from paper before being transposed into pixel art, however this process took a large memory space and technical difficulties were faced when displaying four enemies on-screen due to the characters' large size as a result but the team were able to implement them into the game. Yuno also stated that the Sailor Soldiers' attack techniques were based from pro-wrestling magazines.

Angel requested Arisawa to compose the music, with Yuno stating that although said music felt like Sailor Moon songs they seemed to not fit the action. Seiyūs from the anime series returned to reprise their roles, recording new audio during a break on their schedule due to the project being a character-based game. However, Yuno stated this process also took a large memory space and the characters' attack techniques are spoken quickly due to hardware limits when voice samples are enabled, while simultaneous spoken attacks are disabled during co-op play as a result. Tadano, who was recommended by Nakayoshi editor Fumio Osano to the team at Angel, created art for the cover package, character selection screen, post-transformation poses and the ending. Yuno stated that Tadano also drew more elements that were ultimately scrapped from the final version due to memory space, while having Takeuchi make original youma designs was an idea from Osano due to his desire to see a Sailor Moon title on SNES. Other elements such as destructible vehicles were implemented as a response from players during the game's showcase at a trade show. Several elements, items and stages were either reworked or scrapped before launch.

Sailor Moon was first released for the Super Famicom in Japan by Angel on August 27, 1993 and later on the Super NES in France and Spain by Bandai in November 1994 with a French translation. The game was later ported to the Sega Mega Drive by Arc System Works and TNS, with Ma-Ba publishing it on July 8, 1994.

== Reception ==
Reception

Review scores
Publication	Score
Beep! MegaDrive	(Mega Drive) 5.25/10
Consoles +	(Mega Drive) 60%
Computer and Video Games	(SNES) 53/100
Famitsu	(SNES) 21/40 (Mega Drive) 5/10, 5/10, 6/10, 5/10
HobbyConsolas	(SNES) 76/100
Mega Fun	(Mega Drive) 43%
Player One	(SNES) 40%
Superjuegos	(SNES) 84/100
Total!	(SNES) 3+
Computer+Videogiochi	(Mega Drive) 68/100
Nintendo Magazine System	(SNES) 40/100
Mega Console	(Mega Drive) 69/100

Sailor Moon was met with mixed critical reception on both SNES and Mega Drive. However, public reception was positive; readers of the Japanese Sega Saturn Magazine voted to give the Mega Drive port a 6.5263 out of 10 score, ranking at the number 337 spot in a poll, indicating a popular following.

Animerica's Sergei Shimkevich regarded the SNES version to be a copy of Final Fight and Street Fighter that brings little new to the genre, and instead relies upon the Sailor Moon series to gain attention. Nintendo Magazine System regarded it as a dire Final Fight clone, criticizing its slow pacing, limited moveset, repetitive enemies, sound and playability but commended the graphics and presentation. Computer and Video Games' Deniz Ahmet agreed, commending the audiovisual presentation but criticized the limited controls and moveset, as well as enemy AI, calling it "Unrewarding, unimaginative and unwanted." Likewise, Player One's Guillaume Lassalle praised the visuals but criticized the game for being repetitive and its slow pacing. Hobby Consolas' Esther Barral gave positive remarks to the graphics, audio, simple controls and faithfulness to the original manga but noted its low difficulty during two-player mode and slow character movement. Superjuegos' Bruno Sol criticized the lack of enemy variety and repetitive in-game music but gave positive comments to the sound effects and arcade-like gameplay, comparing it with Final Fight.

Upon reviewing the Mega Drive version, Animerica found its graphics to be better than previous Sailor Moon titles on SNES. Mega Console's Pier-Franco Merenda and Fabio Massa were also positive of this version, praising the audiovisual presentation and longevity but felt mixed in regards to its playability. Mega Fun's Stefan Hellert also praised the large character sprites and impressive backgrounds but criticized the sound design and lack of a two-player mode. Computer+Videogiochi's Marco Ravetto gave positive remarks to the large and fluid character sprites, music and gameplay but he regarded this aspect as monotonous and criticized the lack of two-player mode. Spanish magazine Minami commended the big sprites and visuals.
