= Btooom! =

Manga and anime series

- Cover of the first manga volume
- Genre: Action, survival
- Manga
- Written by: Junya Inoue
- Published by: Shinchosha
- English publisher: NA: Yen Press
- Magazine: Comic Bunch
- Original run: June 19, 2009 – March 20, 2018
- Volumes: 26
- Anime television series
- Directed by: Kotono Watanabe
- Written by: Yōsuke Kuroda
- Music by: Keiji Inai
- Studio: Madhouse
- Licensed by: AUS: Hanabee; NA: Sentai Filmworks; UK: MVM Films
- Original network: Tokyo MX, AT-X, Sun TV, KBS, TV Aichi, BS11
- English network: SEA: Animax Asia
- Original run: October 4, 2012 – December 20, 2012
- Episodes: 12
- Manga

Btooom! U-18
- Written by: Hiroki Ito
- Published by: Shinchosha
- Magazine: Comic Bunch
- Original run: April 2018 – December 2022
- Volumes: 6

Btooom! (stylized as BTOOOM!) is a Japanese manga series written and illustrated by Junya Inoue. It was serialized in Shinchosha's seinen manga magazine Comic Bunch, where it ran from 2009 until 2018, with its chapters collected into 26 tankōbon volumes. Btooom! follows the adventures of Ryōta Sakamoto, an unemployed and isolated young man who is one of the world's top players in the titular video game. After Ryōta is nominated to participate in the real-life version of the game, he becomes trapped inside it and meets his love interest Himiko, who was his in-game wife. With the help of their fellow players, Ryōta and Himiko must find a way to return home.

An anime adaptation covering the first 50 chapters of the manga was produced by Madhouse and aired in Japan on Tokyo MX from October 4 to December 20, 2012, and was streamed with English subtitles by Crunchyroll. The manga series was licensed for an English-language release in North America by Yen Press. The anime series has been licensed by Sentai Filmworks for an English-language release in North America. A sequel, Btooom! U-18, written and illustrated by Hiroki Ito was serialized from 2018 to 2022, and was collected into 6 tankōbon volumes.

== Plot ==
Ryōta Sakamoto is an unemployed 22-year-old young man who lives with his mother Yukie. He is one of the world's top players of the combat video game called Btooom! One day, he awakes in what appears to be a tropical island, though he does not remember how or why he has been transported there. While wandering around, Ryōta sees someone and calls out for help. The stranger responds by throwing a bomb at him. Ryōta soon realizes that his life is in danger and that he has somehow been trapped in a real-life version of his favorite game. In the game Ryōta meets Himiko, who is another Btooom! player — and Ryōta's in-game wife.

As the series progresses during Iida's investigation with the government agents like Matthew Percier, along with the help from Ryōta's step-father and step-uncle Hisanobu and Mitamura, it is revealed that the developer of Btooom!, Tyrannos Japan, has been associated with the Illuminati-like organization called Schwaritz Foundation, led by Longer Schwart, who is none other than Himiko's biological father, in an attempt to use the players as their test subjects for Project Themis to conquer the entire world through the domination of the virtual world and getting rid of the evidence of their exposed crimes they are currently committing.

It also contains two separate endings for Chapter 121: a good ending and a bad ending. In the good ending, Ryōta survives and plans a marriage with Himiko while the organization is forced to retreat into obscurity, while in the bad ending, Ryōta sacrifices himself for Himiko and the remaining players to survive the game. Both endings contain the same event; after the game the victors are called to the HQ of Tyrannos for a victory ceremony and 10,000,000 yen reward for each player but both outcomes differ. Himiko eventually met her father and he reveals her true heritage, imploring her to rule the world from the shadows alongside him and her chosen half-siblings. Disgusted with her father's actions in creating the death game and causing misery and death throughout the world, Himiko detonates the gas bomb, which she hid after making it back to the mainland, killing her father and ending his organization for good. Btooom! U-18 follows the events of the good ending, rendering the bad ending non-canon.

== Characters ==
=== Main characters ===
Ryōta Sakamoto (坂本 竜太, Sakamoto Ryōta)
Voiced by: Kanata Hongō (Japanese); Tyler Galindo (English)
A hikikomori forced to play the game after his mother consented.
Himiko (ヒミコ) / Emilia (エミリア, Emiria)
Voiced by: Suzuko Mimori (Japanese); Brittney Karbowski (English)
Himiko is a high school girl whom is also Btooom! player and was Ryōta's in-game wife, though they did not notice this at first; her real name is Emilia and she is the biological daughter of Lord Longer Schwart, the main antagonist of the series and leader of the Schwart Foundation.

=== Opponents ===
Kōsuke Kira (吉良 康介, Kira Kōsuke)
Voiced by: Miyuki Sawashiro (Japanese); Chelsea McCurdy (English)
One of the Btooom! players believed to be three-star, he was with his father and attorney on the game, until he killed his own father: as a yangire, he was arrested for rape and multiple murder; however, he was sentenced lightly.
Nobutaka Oda (織田 信隆, Oda Nobutaka)
Voiced by: Yūichi Nakamura (Japanese); Crash Buist (English)
One of the most dangerous Btooom! players, he was once Ryota's friend back in high school, until a recent incident caused them to be expelled.
Ken'ya Uesugi (上杉 謙也, Uesugi Ken'ya)
One of the Btooom! players.
Kaguya (輝夜)
One of the Btooom! players.
Masashi Miyamoto (宮本 雅志, Miyamoto Masashi)
Voiced by: Takaya Kuroda (Japanese); Jovan Jackson (English)
A Btooom! player and war veteran, he dislikes using his BIM, preferring to use his knife; died after being exploded using Natsume's BIM and exposed to a corrosive BIM.
Masahito Date (伊達 雅仁, Date Masahito)
Voiced by: Ken Narita (Japanese); David Matranga (English)
A doctor who worked at the same hospital as Shiki Murasaki, he'd blamed her for his failure and played her feelings while on the island.
Kiyoshi Taira (平 清, Taira Kiyoshi)
Voiced by: Tōru Ōkawa (Japanese); Andrew Love (English)
One of the Btooom! players who speaks in the Kansai dialect and an old man whom had initially aligned himself with Ryota.
Hidemi Kinoshita (木下 秀美, Kinoshita Hidemi)
Voiced by: Yōko Hikasa (Japanese); Shelley Calene-Black (English)
A selfish and frivolous Btooom! player who joins forces with Nobutaka until he abandons her.
Yoshiaki Imagawa (今川 義昭, Imagawa Yoshiaki)
Voiced by: Tōru Nara (Japanese); Joshua Sheltz (English)
A Btooom! player who was killed by Ryōta after trying to chase and corner him.
Sōichi Natsume (夏目 壮一, Natsume Sōichi)
Voiced by: Issei Futamata (Japanese); Patrick Poole (English)
Kōsuke's lawyer with a large forehead and a fair amount of wrinkles, suffering from drug addiction; died when Sakamoto threw a BIM on him.
Yoshihisa Kira (吉良 義久, Kira Yoshihisa)
Voiced by: Hisao Egawa (Japanese); Christopher Ayres (English)
The father of Kōsuke Kira whom he'd abused, only to be killed by his son.
Mitsuo Akechi (明智 光男, Akechi Mitsuo)
Voiced by: Yasuhiro Mamiya (Japanese); Mark X. Laskowski (English)
One of the Btooom! players whom tried to rape Himiko, which made her kill him.

=== Other characters ===
Shiki Murasaki (村崎 志紀, Murasaki Shiki)
Voiced by: Rica Fukami (Japanese); Maggie Flecknoe (English)
A player from the previous round of Btooom!, a year and a half prior to the start of the series and a former associate of Masahito; she'd lost her arm and lived off the island.
Isamu Kondō (近藤 勇, Kondō Isamu)
Voiced by: Yasumichi Kushida (Japanese); Parke Fech (English)
One of the Btooom! players who constantly spoke his mind and argued with Masashi Miyamoto; killed by him through a slit throat.
Misako Hōjō (北条 美沙子, Hōjō Misako)
Voiced by: Mai Tōdō (Japanese); Brittany Deans (English)
A Btooom! player killed by Nobutaka Oda.
Tsuneaki Iida (飯田 恒明, Iida Tsuneaki)
Voiced by: Junpei Asashina (Japanese); Leraldo Anzaldua (English)
A former senpai of Ryōta's who works in Tyrannos Japan.
Yukie Sakamoto (坂本 幸恵, Sakamoto Yukie)
Voiced by: Ayumi Kida (Japanese); Shelley Calene-Black (English)
Ryōta's mother, committed suicide after she sold her own son out of depression due to her own son's NEET habits and her partner's company going bankrupt.
Hisanobu Sakamoto (坂本 久信, Sakamoto Hisanobu)
Voiced by: Mitsuaki Madono (Japanese); Jay Hickman (English)
Ryōta's stepfather, learnt his partner sold her own son and committed suicide, just to give him money.
Yoshioka (吉岡)
Voiced by: Hiroyuki Iwasaki (Japanese); Johnny De La Cerda (English)
A young man Himiko knew and trusted, he was part of a band and convinced Himiko to introduce her friends to them, before raping them.
Miho (ミホ)
Voiced by: Shiori Mikami (Japanese); Margaret McDonald (English)
Formerly the best friend of Himiko, she'd betrayed her for money and was raped by the group.
Arisa (アリサ)
Voiced by: Noriko Ueda (Japanese); Rachel Logue (English)
Another former friend of Himiko, also betrayed her for money and abandoned them.
Yuki (ユキ)
Voiced by: Yukiyo Fujii (Japanese); Brittany Deans (English)
Yet another former friend of Himiko who betrayed her for money and abandoned them.
Matthew Percier (マシュー・ペルシエ, Mashū Perushie)
A government agent who helps Ryota to expose the dark secret behind Tyrannos Japan's Btooom! "beta test", then led an operation to rescue him along with other remaining Btooom! survivors on behalf of Iida and Hisanobu.

== Media ==
=== Manga ===
Junya Inoue began publishing Btooom! in Shinchosha's weekly magazine Comic Bunch in 2009. Comic Bunch ceased publication on August 27, 2010, but returned on January 21, 2011, as a monthly magazine. It was announced in the May 2014 issue of Comic Bunch, released on March 20, that the manga would enter its final arc in the June issue, released on April 21, 2014. Inoue revealed on Twitter that the series will end with the release of its 26th volume, publishing its final chapter in the May issue of Bunch in March 2018. In an unusual twist, the author made two unique endings, providing "the dark" and "the light" versions of the ending, so that the readers are able to choose what protagonist Ryota Sakamoto will do at a pivotal point in the manga's story.

The series is published in tankōbon form by Shinchosha, and has been licensed for release in North America by Yen Press, who released it between February 2013 and August 2018.

With the Btooom! manga ending in March 2018, a manga spin-off/sequel called Btooom! U-18 was announced in February 2018 to begin publication that April. The new series was written by Hiroki Ito, who is known for Ouroboros and Impossibility Defense (Funouhan). The new manga is a sequel to the main story and launched in the same magazine issue that featured the original manga's light ending. The spin-off ended serialization in December 2022 and was collected into six volumes.

==== Volume list ====
The series has been collected into twenty-six tankōbon volumes as of August 2018. All twenty-six volumes have been published in English, with the final volume published in April 2020. The final chapter was released on March 20, 2018, and the final volume was released on August 9, 2018.

No.	Original release date	Original ISBN	English release date	English ISBN
1	October 9, 2009	978-4-10-771516-6	February 26, 2013	978-0-316-23267-8
2	January 9, 2010	978-4-10-771537-1	May 28, 2013	978-0-316-24534-0
3	May 8, 2010	978-4-10-771563-0	August 20, 2013	978-0-316-24535-7
4	October 9, 2010	978-4-10-771593-7	November 19, 2013	978-0-316-24536-4
5	June 9, 2011	978-4-10-771622-4	February 18, 2014	978-0-316-24542-5
6	September 9, 2011	978-4-10-771633-0	May 27, 2014	978-0-316-24543-2
7	January 7, 2012	978-4-10-771647-7	August 26, 2014	978-0-316-24544-9
8	June 8, 2012	978-4-10-771665-1	November 18, 2014	978-0-316-33623-9
9	September 7, 2012	978-4-10-771680-4	February 24, 2015	978-0-316-33625-3
10	January 9, 2013	978-4-10-771693-4	May 19, 2015	978-0-316-38047-8
11	May 9, 2013	978-4-10-771708-5	August 18, 2015	978-0-316-25885-2
12	September 9, 2013	978-4-10-771718-4	November 17, 2015	978-0-316-33957-5
13	January 9, 2014	978-4-10-771733-7	February 23, 2016	978-0-316-33966-7
14	May 9, 2014	978-4-10-771746-7	July 26, 2016	978-0-316-27059-5
15	September 9, 2014	978-4-10-771773-3	November 22, 2016	978-0-316-50281-8
16	January 9, 2015	978-4-10-771794-8	February 21, 2017	978-0-316-50283-2
17	May 9, 2015	978-4-10-771819-8	May 23, 2017	978-0-316-50285-6
18	September 9, 2015	978-4-10-771843-3	August 22, 2017	978-0-316-50287-0
19	January 9, 2016	978-4-10-771871-6	November 28, 2017	978-0-316-41278-0
20	May 9, 2016	978-4-10-771895-2	February 27, 2018	978-0-316-52058-4
21	September 9, 2016	978-4-10-771918-8	May 22, 2018	978-0-316-52061-4
22	January 7, 2017	978-4-10-771949-2	August 21, 2018	978-0-316-52065-2
23	May 9, 2017	978-4-10-771980-5	January 22, 2019	978-1-975-32892-4
24	September 8, 2017	978-4-10-772011-5	March 19, 2019	978-1-975-32895-5
25	February 9, 2018	978-4-10-772051-1	June 18, 2019	978-1-975-32898-6
26	August 9, 2018	978-4-10-772109-9 (light); 978-4-10-772110-5 (dark)	April 14, 2020	978-1-975-30425-6 (light); 978-1-975-30551-2 (dark)

==== Btooom! U-18 ====
No.	Japanese release date	Japanese ISBN
1	November 9, 2018	978-4-10-772128-0
2	July 9, 2019	978-4-10-772197-6
3	May 9, 2020	978-4-10-772283-6
4	December 9, 2020	978-4-10-772347-5
5	December 9, 2021	978-4-10-772452-6
6	March 9, 2023	978-4-10-772580-6

=== Anime ===
In June 2012, it was announced that the manga will be adapted into an anime television series by Madhouse, director Kotono Watanabe, and scriptwriter Yōsuke Kuroda. The 12-episode series premiered in Japan on Tokyo MX from October 4 to December 20, 2012, and was streamed with English subtitles by Crunchyroll in North America, UK, Ireland, Australia, New Zealand, Scandinavia, the Netherlands and South Africa. The anime has been licensed for a 2013 home video release by Sentai Filmworks in North America. The opening theme song is "No pain, No game" by Nano and the closing theme song is "Aozora" (アオゾラ) by May'n. The anime covers the first 50 chapters of the manga (up to Volume 9).

At the beginning of November 2019, the company Televisa through BitMe announced the premiere of 3 new series to its program bar, Among those series was Btooom, the same series was released on November 28, 2019, being dubbed 12 episodes in Latin Spanish and distributed by its video game channel and anime bitme by a large part of South America.

=== Game ===
In late February 2017, the BTOOOM! game produced by Masato Hayashi was launched and immediately shot to the top of the charts for free game apps. Despite early success, the game stayed in Japan's top five only for several weeks, and by April 2017 Goboiano reported that the app had "fallen below the top 50". The game was last updated in July 2017 and never received an English port for Android and iOS/iPhone.

Also called Btooom Online, originally developed in 2016, it was a battle royale game, predating PlayerUnknown's Battlegrounds and Fortnite. The original BTOOOM! manga itself also features a fictional battle royale video game. The manga was in turn inspired by the 2000 Japanese film Battle Royale.

== Reception ==
Theron Martin from Anime News Network (ANN) reviewed the first few episodes by making comparisons with Sword Art Online which has similar plot theme but differs in style and takes a "darker, grittier, and entirely more visceral approach" as well as displaying combat "ingenuity" rather than SAO's "powermongering approach". Despite the similarities, Btooom! has fairly typical weaponry that produces "a novel twist which dramatically shapes the strategic moves of the players in interesting ways" and the character choices that sway the audience's impressions of them. Overall, he praised the consistency of thrilling action scenes, the efforts on developing the protagonist and its effective dramatic, intense moments. Fellow ANN editor Bamboo Dong reviewed the complete anime series in 2013. He was critical of the ensemble cast having "character development problems" regarding their one-dimensional evil tendencies and how they got onto the island, but also found the series "deeply riveting" with its fight scenes like the "action-soaked, bomb-blasted popcorn flicks" it invokes, concluding that: "It's great and awesome, as long as you don't think about it. Is it incredibly fun to watch? Oh, absolutely. Will you have a good time? Undeniably. Is it a well-written show with three-dimensional characters and a thought-provoking story? Lord, no. The less synapses you fire, the better your enjoyment of the series." Richard Eisenbeis of Kotaku was commedable towards the series for taking a realistic use of the game's abilities in the outside world and exploring the dark nature in humanity throughout the death game, despite being previously seen in similar properties, concluding that "if you are interested in the themes it explores, or are just a fan of "death game" stories in general, this one is certainly worth a watch."

Even though the anime series became popular internationally, the BTOOOM! Blu-ray/DVD discs only sold 338 copies in Japan.
