= Junya Inoue =

Japanese manga artist

Junya Inoue 井上 淳哉
- Born: October 18, 1971 (age 55) Shimanto, Kochi, Japan
- Area: Manga artist
- Notable works: Otogi Matsuri, Btooom!

Junya Inoue (井上 淳哉, Inoue Jun'ya; born 1971 in Shimanto, Kochi) is a Japanese manga artist. He is also known by the name Joker Jun. In 1991 he replied to a recruitment ad for Toaplan. Along with some other staff Inoue was transferred to Gazelle before he left to join Cave, where he worked as character and graphic designer, sound producer, and a video game director. ESP Ra.De. was his first title as graphic director. He debuted as a manga artist in 2002, with his work Otogi Matsuri (おとぎ奉り; lit. Dark Offering). He is best known in the West for his manga Btooom!, which was serialized from 2009 to 2018.

== Works ==
=== Games ===
Title	Year	Role(s)
Dogyuun	1992	
Knuckle Bash	1993	
Batsugun	1993	Graphic Designer
Pretty Soldier Sailor Moon	1995	Graphic Designer
Air Gallet	1996	Graphic Designer
DoDonPachi	1997	Designer
ESP Ra.De.	1998	Graphic Director, Sound Producer
Guwange	1999	Character Design, Character Voice
Progear	2001	Director, Character and Mechanic Design
DoDonPachi DaiOuJou	2002	Super Adviser
Deathsmiles	2007	
Deathsmiles II	2008	Supervisor, Voice Cast
DoDonPachi SaiDaiOuJou	2012	

=== Films ===
- The Great Yokai War: Guardians (2021) – yōkai designer [with Katsuya Terada and Hiromitsu Soma]

=== Manga ===
Title	Period	Role(s)
Chrono Crusade	2000–2002	Assistant (vol. 2–3, 5)
Otogi Matsuri: Dark Offering	2002–2008	Story and Art
Btooom!	2009–2018	Story and Art
La Vie en Doll	2014–2016	Story and Art
Batsugun - Truth Story Batsugun	2017	Story and Art
Btooom! U-18	2018–2023	Original Work
Kaijuu Jieitai: Task Force for Paranormal Disaster Management	2020–2024	Story and Art

=== Anime ===
Title	Year	Role(s)
Btooom!	2012	Original work, End card illustration
