= Pretty Soldier Sailor Moon (arcade game) =

1995 arcade game

- Developer: Gazelle
- Publisher: JP: Banpresto
- Director: Hiroyuki Fujimoto
- Producer: Johan Sato
- Designer: Satoshi Iwataki
- Programmer: Hiroyuki Fujimoto
- Artist: Junya Inoue
- Composer: Seīchi Sakurai
- Series: Sailor Moon
- Platform: Arcade
- Release: WW: 22 March 1995
- Genre: Beat 'em up
- Modes: Single-player, multiplayer
- Arcade system: CAVE 68000

Pretty Soldier Sailor Moon (Note: Japanese: 美少女戦士セーラームーン, Hepburn: Bishōjo Senshi Sērā Mūn; also referred as Sailor Moon Arcade.) is a side-scrolling beat 'em up arcade video game developed by Gazelle and released on March 22, 1995. It was published by Banpresto. It is the first game to be created by Gazelle, one of the offshoots of defunct developer Toaplan that were founded after they declared bankruptcy in 1994, and one of the few titles based upon Naoko Takeuchi's Sailor Moon shōjo manga and anime series that had an official international release, and it also has been compared with other titles in the same genre such as Capcom's Final Fight and Technōs Japan's Double Dragon.

Following the first season of the anime series, which adapted the first arc of the manga, the players control one of the five original Inner Senshi and fight against enemies across several locations in order to protect Earth from the Dark Kingdom, a group of antagonists led by Queen Beryl who previously destroyed the ancient Moon Kingdom as they attempt to steal life energy from humans and the Silver Crystal to free Queen Metaria from her imprisonment. Takeuchi supervised the production of the project and seiyūs from the anime series returned to reprise their roles, with mangaka and Knuckle Bash designer Junya Inoue serving as one of the game's graphic designers.

== Gameplay ==
Gameplay screenshot showing Sailor Moon battling against Castor and Pollux, the game's first bosses.

As with previously released Sailor Moon titles on Mega Drive and Super Famicom, Pretty Soldier Sailor Moon is a side-scrolling beat 'em up game where players take control either of the five original Sailor Soldiers across eight stages, each one set in a different location, and fight against an assortment of enemies and villains from the series in order to defeat Queen Beryl and the Dark Kingdom. Similar to Golden Axe, each Soldier has a special attack of their own that deals damage to all enemies on-screen at once depending on the number of crystals collected along the way, which up to a dozen can be fought at one time. These special attacks also trigger special animations for each of the Soldier depending on the number of crystals used as well. Unlike other titles based on the franchise, most of the fighting is physical rather than magical and the Soldier can run and perform dashing attacks. Each Soldier also has different attributes during gameplay, encouraging players to select their preferred character. At certain difficult points during battle, Tuxedo Mask will show up and throw a rose, which is a bonus drop that restores health for the players and damages the enemies as well.

== Development and release ==
Pretty Soldier Sailor Moon was the first title to be developed by Gazelle, which was one of the offshoot companies formed after the closure of Toaplan due to bankruptcy, along with CAVE and Takumi Corporation. Sailor Moon author Naoko Takeuchi was involved during the production as supervisor and seiyūs from the anime series returned to reprise their respective roles. Mangaka and Knuckle Bash designer Junya Inoue was also involved during its production as one of the graphic designers. There are two versions of the game released: 95/03/22 and 95/03/22B. Prior to launch, it was showcased in a playable state to attendees at the 1994 Amusement Machine Show. The latter of which fixes a bug with the boss battle against Tuxedo Mask.

== Reception and legacy ==
In Japan, Game Machine listed Pretty Soldier Sailor Moon on their May 1, 1995 issue as being the eleventh most-successful arcade game of the month, outperforming titles such as Virtua Fighter. Spanish magazine GamesTech praised the visuals. In a retrospective review, Todd Ciolek of Anime News Network criticized several aspects such as the lack of sub-weapon and length. J.A. Laraque of Obsolete Gamer gave an overall mixed review of the game, criticizing the music and sound effects, while regarding it as a "rip-off of Final Fight with little girls in school uniforms." Kotaku included it among the best looking beat 'em up games from the 16-bit era. Argentinian website Malditos Nerds ranked it as number two on their top Sailor Moon games. Time Extension included the game on their top 25 "Best Beat 'Em Ups of All Time" list.

After the initial release of Pretty Soldier Sailor Moon, Gazelle would develop another title in the franchise two years later: Quiz Bishōjo Senshi Sailor Moon: Chiryoku Tairyoku Toki no Un, which was only released in Japan by Banpresto on 1997 before the company was disbanded and many of its members moved on to CAVE, another offshoot company formed by former Toaplan members.
