= Gazelle (video game developer) =

Japanese video game developer 1994-2002

Gazelle Co., Ltd.
- Native name: 株式会社ガゼル
- Romanized name: Kabushiki-gaisha Gazeru
- Company type: Kabushiki gaisha
- Industry: Video games
- Predecessor: Toaplan
- Founded: 1994; 32 years ago
- Defunct: 2002; 24 years ago
- Fate: Disbanded
- Headquarters: Japan

Gazelle Co., Ltd. (Note: Japanese: 株式会社ガゼル, Hepburn: Kabushiki-gaisha Gazeru) was a Japanese video game developer founded in 1994 by former Toaplan employees after the latter company declared bankruptcy the same year.

== History ==
After Toaplan declared bankruptcy, Gazelle was founded by Tatsuya Uemura, Junya Inoue, Mikio Yamaguchi, Kaneyo Ōhira, and Yoshitatsu Sakai. The new firm originally focused on printed circuit board exportation prior to game development. Cave co-founder Tsuneki Ikeda refused to join the company. According to Uemura, his former Toaplan CEO sold the company's IPs to both Gazelle and Raizing but doubted about the procedure's overall legality. During its existence, Gazelle developed three arcade titles for Banpresto, utilizing Atlus's chipset and platform: Pretty Soldier Sailor Moon, Air Gallet, and Quiz Bishōjo Senshi Sailor Moon: Chiryoku Tairyoku Toki no Un. The company also ported three Toaplan titles to fifth generation game consoles, among other projects. Prior to ceasing game development and closure, many of the company's staff later joined Cave and Raizing.

== Games developed ==
Game	Details
Pretty Soldier Sailor Moon Original release date: 22 March 1995	Release years by system: 1995 – Arcade game
Pretty Soldier Sailor Moon Original release date: 22 March 1995	Notes: Beat 'em up; Published by Banpresto and Sega; Based upon Naoko Takeuchi's Sailor Moon shōjo manga and anime series
Air Gallet Original release date: February 1996	Release years by system: 1996 – Arcade game
Air Gallet Original release date: February 1996	Notes: Vertically scrolling Shoot 'em up; Published by Banpresto
Toaplan Shooting Battle 1 Original release date: 30 August 1996	Release years by system: 1996 – PlayStation
Toaplan Shooting Battle 1 Original release date: 30 August 1996	Notes: Compilation; Published by Banpresto; 2-in-1 package conversion of the 1985 arcade original Tiger-Heli and its 1987 sequel Twin Cobra
Batsugun Original release date: 25 October 1996	Release years by system: 1996 – Sega Saturn
Batsugun Original release date: 25 October 1996	Notes: Vertically scrolling bullet hell; Published by Banpresto; 2-in-1 package conversion of the 1993 arcade original and its unreleased 1994 special version
Quiz Bishōjo Senshi Sailor Moon: Chiryoku Tairyoku Toki no Un Original release date: February 1997	Release years by system: 1997 – Arcade game
Quiz Bishōjo Senshi Sailor Moon: Chiryoku Tairyoku Toki no Un Original release date: February 1997	Notes: Quiz game; Published by Banpresto; Based upon Naoko Takeuchi's Sailor Moon shōjo manga and anime series
