= Truxton (video game) =

1988 video game

- Arcade flyer
- Developer: Toaplan (Note: PC Engine version developed by Sting Entertainment.)
- Publishers: Taito: Arcade; JP/EU: Taito; NA: Midway Genesis/Mega Drive Sega
- Designers: Naoki Ogiwara; Sanae Nitō; Yuko Tataka
- Composer: Masahiro Yuge
- Series: Truxton
- Platforms: Arcade, Mega Drive/Genesis, PC Engine, iOS, Android
- Release: October 1988: Arcade; JP: October 1988; NA/EU: February 1989 Mega Drive/Genesis; JP: 9 December 1989; NA: December 1989; EU: November 1990 PC Engine; JP: 24 July 1992 iOS, Android; JP: 24 September 2019
- Genre: Scrolling shooter
- Modes: Single-player, multiplayer

Truxton (Note: Also known as Tatsujin (Japanese: 達人(タツジン); "Expert" or "Master") in Japan.) is a 1988 vertically scrolling shooter video game developed by Toaplan and published by Taito for Japanese and European arcades; in North America, it was distributed by Midway. It is set in a future where the Gidans alien race, led by Dogurava, have invaded the fictional planet Borogo. Players assume the role of fighter pilot Tatsuo taking control of the Super Fighter ship on a last-ditch effort to overthrow the alien invaders.

Truxton was conceived by Masahiro Yuge, who wanted to create a scrolling shooter where memorization was its main focus. The game inherited previously established ideas from Slap Fight, and was developed in conjunction with Hellfire, although work on the project had already started privately during production of Twin Cobra.

Truxton proved to be a commercial success in Japanese arcades, earning several awards from Gamest magazine. However, it was less successful in western regions and was met with mixed reception from game magazines. The game has since been released on multiple platforms, each one featuring changes and additions compared to the original version. It was followed by the arcade sequel Truxton II in 1992. The rights to the game are currently owned by Tatsujin, a company formed by Yuge.

== Gameplay ==
Arcade version screenshot

Truxton is a science fiction-themed vertically scrolling shooter where players assume the role of Tatsuo, taking control of the Super Fighter ship through five increasingly difficult levels, each with a boss at the end that must be fought, in a last-ditch effort to overthrow the invading Gidans, led by Dogurava. The Super Fighter is controlled over a constantly scrolling background, and the scenery never stops moving. The main ship only has two weapons: the main gun, which travels a max distance of the screen's height, and three bombs capable of obliterating any enemy caught within its blast radius.

Similar to Twin Cobra, there are three types of weapons that can be acquired by destroying incoming carriers, ranging from the red wide-reaching shot, the blue homing laser and the green straight beam. The ship's firepower is upgraded by picking up multiple "P" icons in a row, and can switch between any of the three weapons by collecting the respective color of each one. Other items can also be picked up along the way, such as 1UPs and speed increasers.

The game employs a checkpoint system in which a downed single player will start at the beginning of the checkpoint they managed to reach before dying. There are also hidden bonus secrets to reveal by meeting certain requirements during gameplay. Getting hit by enemy fire will result in losing a life, as well as a penalty of decreasing the ship's firepower and all medals collected to their original state. Once all lives are lost, the game is over unless the player inserts more credits into the arcade machine to continue playing. The game loops back to the first stage after completing the last stage, with the second loop increasing in difficulty.

== Plot ==
The plot summary of Truxton varies between each version, and is explained through supplementary materials. Taking place somewhere in space, an armada of Gidans, led by the evil Dogurava, is invading the fictional planet Borogo aboard five gargantuan asteroids. After surviving an attack on an orbiting Borogo cargo barge, pilot Tatsuo enters a remaining ship called the Super Fighter and challenges the Gidans in a desperate attempt to quell the alien invasion and divert their asteroid fortresses in the process.

== Development ==
Truxton was the creation of programmer Masahiro Yuge, whose previous work for Toaplan included Tiger-Heli, Slap Fight, and Twin Cobra. Truxton was his first original project under the role of both producer and composer. Yuge wanted to create a scrolling shooter where players would become increasingly better the more they were able to remember specific stage designs and secrets, focusing on creating sections in levels that required a specific weapon to defeat certain enemies. Tatsuya Uemura stated that the project was developed in conjunction with Hellfire.

Many of the design choices, such as the memorization feature and its usage of secrets, were derived from ideas previously established in Slap Fight. The blue homing laser was based on a dream Yuge had, which featured a powerful laser that wiped out most enemies on the screen, and was implemented to be both the main weapon and a selling point. Level design was one of the main areas of the project, as Yuge did not want sections that could easily be memorized to the point of making them boring. "Safespots" were intentionally added to levels to allow breathing room for players. The lack of a cooperative two-player mode was cited by Yuge as being against the game's theme and would have made the memorization mechanic a pointless addition.

Naoki Ogiwara, Sanae Nitō, and Yuko Tataka acted as game designers in the development cycle. Ogiwara had already began work on designs for Truxton in secret during production of Twin Cobra due to his interest in creating science fiction artwork, which were finished after the latter was completed and gave inspirations to the team with enemy patterns. The Sega Genesis version was developed in-house by the same staff from the original arcade release after Sega discussed a conversion for the console with Toaplan. Uemura and Tataka have stated that working with the Genesis proved to be difficult due to several restrictions imposed by the console's hardware.

== Release ==
Truxton was released for Japanese arcades in October 1988 by Taito. It was later released in February 1989 in Europe and North America by Taito and Bally Midway (the latter under the Midway brand), respectively. The Japanese version was named Tatsujin, based on the Japanese word for "master". It became Toaplan's first game to have their logo displayed on the title screen and their name credited. An album containing music from Truxton and other Toaplan games was released in Japan by Datam Polystar in June 1989.

In 1989, Truxton was ported to the Sega Genesis by Toaplan; this version was first released in Japan on December 9, 1989, and North America the same month by Sega, followed by Europe in November 1990. The Genesis port stays faithful to the original arcade release, but has a number of key differences, such as having a smaller color palette that lead to sprites being recolored in different ways, along with other presentation and gameplay changes. The Genesis port was later re-released by independent publisher Retro-Bit in 2020.

Truxton later received a port to the PC Engine by Sting Entertainment, released exclusively in Japan by Taito on 24 July 1992. The PC Engine release has visual and audio changes, and introduces an options menu where multiple gameplay settings can be altered. A version for the X68000 was in development and planned to be published by Kaneko, but was not released despite being advertised in Japanese publications such as Oh!X. On 24 September 2019, Truxton was re-released for iOS and Android mobile devices in Japan by MOBIRIX Corporation under the name Tatsujin Classic. In July 2022, the original arcade version was included as part of the Sega Astro City Mini V, a vertically oriented variant of the Sega Astro City mini console. Truxton was also included as part of the Toaplan Arcade 1 compilation for Evercade on 15 December of the same year. In February 2023, a Microsoft Windows version, published by Bitwave Games, was released on Steam and GOG.com.

== Reception ==
Reception

Aggregate score
Aggregator	Score
GameRankings	(Genesis) 55%

Review scores
Publication	Score
AllGame	(Arcade) 3/5 (Genesis) 3.5/5
Computer and Video Games	(Genesis) 94%
Electronic Gaming Monthly	(Genesis) 25 / 40
Famitsu	(Genesis) 27 / 40 (PCE) 21 / 40
Aktueller Software Markt	(Genesis) 6 / 12
Beep! Mega Drive	(Genesis) 32 / 40
Commodore User	(Arcade) 6 / 10
CVG Mean Machines	(Genesis) 82%
Computer Entertainer	(Genesis) 3/3
Consoles +	(PCE) 68%
Gekkan PC Engine	(PCE) 80 / 100
HobbyConsolas	(Genesis) 94 / 100
Joypad	(PCE) 78%
Joystick	(Genesis) 77% (Genesis) 66% (PCE) 70%
Marukatsu PC Engine	(PCE) 30 / 40
Mean Machines	(Genesis) 82%
Mega Drive Advanced Gaming	(Genesis) 78%
Mega Drive Fan	(Genesis) 18.09 / 30
MegaTech	(Genesis) 82%
Micromanía	(Genesis) 8 / 10
PC Engine Fan	(PCE) 20.82 / 30
Power Play	(Genesis) 77%
Raze	(Genesis) 85%
S: The Sega Magazine	(Genesis) 88%
Sega Power	(Genesis) 4/5
Sega Pro	(Genesis) 88 / 100
Tilt	(Genesis) 14 / 20
VideoGame	(Genesis) 4/5
Zero	(Genesis) 87 / 100

Awards
Publication	Award
Gamest (1991)	The Best Game #43 (Arcade)
Gamest Mook (1998)	Best Shooting Award 4th, Annual Hit Game 16th (Arcade)

Truxton was met with mixed response from critics since its original arcade release. According to Masahiro Yuge, the game sold well in Japan, but proved to be less successful in western regions. Game Machine listed it as the most successful table arcade unit of November 1988, outperforming titles such as Scramble Spirits and World Stadium.

The Genesis version was well received when it was released, with Mean Machines summarising it as "a fine example of a pure, no-frills arcade blast". MegaTech said that although original features were distinctly lacking, "it's a good solid blast which offers plenty of action, speed and excitement". Likewise, the PC Engine version was also well received. In 1996, GamesMaster ranked Truxton 95th on their list of the "Top 100 Games of All Time".

== Legacy ==
In 1992, the sequel Truxton II was released for arcades, and was later ported to the FM Towns. The rights to Truxton and other IPs from Toaplan are now owned by Tatsujin, a company named after the game's Japanese title, which was founded in 2017 by Masahiro Yuge and has been part of Embracer Group since 2022. The Super Fighter ship appears in Game Tengoku CruisnMix for Microsoft Windows, Nintendo Switch, and PlayStation 4. Artist Perry "Gryzor/Rozyrg" Sessions cited Truxton as one of the main influences for Super XYX.

In 2023, Tatsujin announced Truxton Extreme, a sequel to Truxton II. It was released for Microsoft Windows, Nintendo Switch 2, PlayStation 5, and Xbox Series X/S on 30 July 2026.
