= List of arcade video games: E =

This is a list of arcade video games organized alphabetically by name. It does not include PC or console games unless they were also released in video arcades. See Lists of video games for related lists.

Title	Alternate Title(s)	Year	Manufacturer	Genre(s)	Max. Players	PCB Model
E-Jan High School	—	1996	Seibu Kaihatsu	Mahjong	1	
E-Jan Sakurasou - Akibeya Arimasu	—	1999	Seibu Kaihatsu	Mahjong	1	
Eagle Shot Golf	—	1994	Sammy			
Earth Defense Force	—	1991	Jaleco	Scrolling shooter	2	
Eco Fighters	Ultimate Ecology ^{JP}	1993	Capcom	Scrolling shooter	2	CPS2
Eeekk!	—	1983	Epos			
Egg Hunt	—	1995	Invi Image			
Egg Venture	—	1997	ICE	Shooting gallery	2	
Egg Venture Deluxe	—	1997	ICE	Shooting gallery	2	
Eggor	—	1983	Telko			
Eggs	Scrambled Egg	1983	Universal			
Ehrgeiz	—	1998	Namco	Fighting	2	
Eight Ball Action	—	1984	Seatongrove Ltd.			
Eight Forces	—	1994	Tecmo			
Eight Man	—	1991	SNK	Beat 'em up	2	NeoGeo
Ejihon Tantei Jimusyo	—	1995	Sega			
El Fin Del Tiempo	—	1982	Niemer			
El Grande - 5 Card Draw	—	1982	Tuni Electro Service			
Elan Doreé: Legend of Dragoon	Touryuu Densetsu Elan Doreé	1998	Sai-Mate			Sega ST-V
Eldorado	—	19??	CD Express			
The Electric Yo-Yo	—	1982	Taito			
Elevator Action	—	1983	Taito	Platformer	2	
Elevator Action Returns	—	1994	Taito	Platformer	2	
Elevator Action: Death Parade	—	2009	Taito	Light gun shooter		
Elevator Action: Invasion	—	2021	UNIS	Light gun shooter	2	
Eleven Beat World Tournament	—	1998	Hudson Soft			
Elfin	—	1999	dgPIX Entertainment			
Elimination	Quadrapong	1974	Atari	Sports	4	
Eliminator	—	1981	Gremlin / Sega	Multi-directional shooter	4	
Embargo	—	1977	Cinematronics			
Emeraldia	—	1993	Namco	Puzzle	2	
Emergency Call Ambulance	—	1999	Sega		1	
Empire City: 1931	—	1986	Seibu Kaihatsu			
The Empire Strikes Back	—	1985	Atari Games	Rail shooter	1	
The End	—	1980	Konami			
Enduro Racer	—	1987	Sega	Racing	1	
Enforce	—	1989	Taito			
Enma Daiō	—	1993	Toaplan			
Equites	—	1984	Alpha Denshi	Scrolling shooter	2	
Erotictac	—	1990	Sisteme			
ES Evolution Soccer	—	2001	Evoga Entertainment			
Escape from the Planet of the Robot Monsters	—	1989	Atari Games	Shooter	2	
Escape Kids	—	1991	Konami	Sports game	4	
Esh's Aurunmilla	—	1984	Funai			
Espgaluda	—	2003	CAVE	Scrolling shooter	2	
Espgaluda II	—	2005	CAVE	Scrolling shooter	2	
ESP Ra.De.	—	1998	CAVE	Scrolling shooter	2	
Espial	—	1983	Orca	Scrolling shooter	2	
EuroPlay 2001	—	2001	Sleic			
Every Second Counts	—	1990	Bell-Fruit			
Evil Night	Hell Night ^{EU}	1998	Konami	Rail shooter	3	Konami M2
Evil Stone	—	1990	Spacy Industrial	Platform	3	
Ex Zeus	—	2003	Hyper DevBox Japan	Rail shooter	1	
Excelsior	—	1995	Playmark			
Excite League	—	1989	Sega	Sports		
Exciting Soccer	—	1983	Alpha Denshi	Sports	2	
Exciting Soccer II	—	1984	Alpha Denshi	Sports	2	
Exerion	—	1984	Jaleco	Rail shooter	2	
Exerizer	Sky Fox ^{NA}	1987	Jaleco	Scrolling shooter	2	
Explorer	—	1982	Data East			DECO
Explosive Breaker	Bakuretsu Breaker ^{JP}	1992	Kaneko	Scrolling shooter	2	
Express Raider	Western Express^{JP}	1986	Data East			
Extermination (Taito)	—	1987	Taito		2	
Exterminator	—	1989	Gottlieb			
Extra Bases	—	1980	Bally Midway	Sports	2	
Extra Draw	—	2003	IGS			
Extreme Downhill	—	1995	Sammy			
Extreme Hunting	—	2004	Sammy			
Extreme Hunting 2: Tournament Edition	—	2006	Sammy			
Exvania	—	1992	Namco	Maze	4	
Exzisus	—	1987	Taito	Scrolling shooter	2	
Eyes	—	1982	Techstar	Maze	2	
Ez Touch	—	2002	IGS			
EZ2Dancer 1st Move	—	2000	Amuse World			
EZ2Dancer 2nd Move	—	2002	Amuse World			
Ez2Dj The 1st Tracks	—	1999	Amuse World			
