= Puzzle Uo Poko =

1998 video game

- Developer: Cave
- Publisher: Jaleco
- Designer: Toshiaki Tomizawa
- Platforms: Arcade, Mobile phone
- Release: JP: February 1998
- Genre: Puzzle
- Mode: Vertical-scrolling shooter
- Arcade system: CAVE 68000

Puzzle Uo Poko (Note: Japanese: パズル 魚ポコ(うおぽこ), Hepburn: Pazuru Uo Poko) is a 1998 arcade puzzle game developed by Cave and published by Jaleco. Unlike several other releases by Cave, Uo Poko remained exclusive to arcades and did not see a contemporary port for a home console. The title has since been re-released on the Antstream service in 2019.

== Gameplay ==
Gameplay screenshot

Puzzle Uo Poko is a visual matching game in which one player or two co-operative players (represented by cats) try to clear the screen of coloured bubbles in order to progress to the next level. All the action takes place underwater across 30 stages and with each completed level the cats travel deeper in their submarine.

== Development and release ==
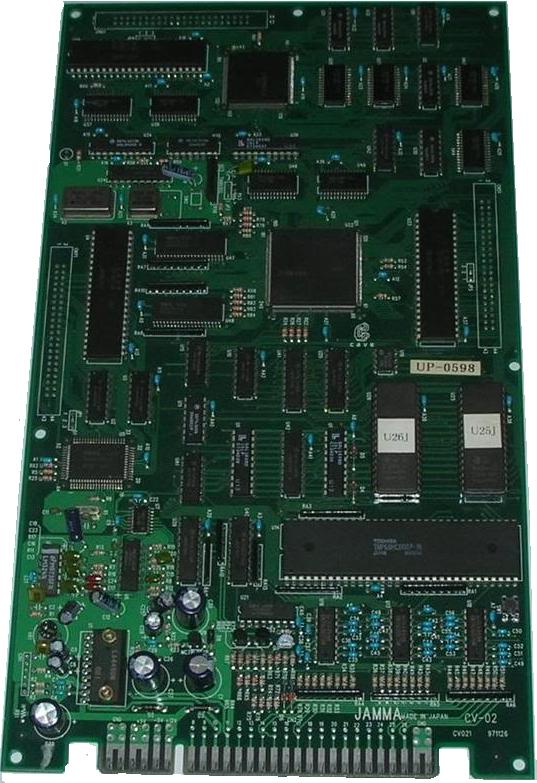
Puzzle Uo Poko arcade PCB

Puzzle Uo Poko was solely designed by Toshiaki Tomizawa, co-founder of Cave whose previous works include the DonPachi series.

In 2005, Cave released Puzzle! Mushihime-tama, a spiritual sequel to Uo Poko presented as a spin-off of the Mushihimesama series of manic shooters.

== Reception ==
In Japan, Game Machine listed Puzzle Uo Poko on their April 15, 1998 issue as being the twenty-first most-popular arcade game at the time. Game Hihyō also reviewed the game.
