= DoDonPachi Resurrection =

2008 video game

- Developer: Cave
- Publishers: JP: AMI; EU: Rising Star Games; WW: Degica (PC) Live Wire (Switch)
- Designer: Kouji Ogata
- Composers: Manabu Namiki; Azusa Chiba; Yoshimi Kudo
- Series: DonPachi
- Platforms: Arcade, Xbox 360, iOS, Android, Microsoft Windows, Nintendo Switch
- Release: May 22, 2008: Arcade; JP: May 22, 2008 Version 1.5; JP: June 24, 2008 Xbox 360; JP: November 25, 2010; EU: November 4, 2011 Black Label; JP: February 3, 2011 iOS; WW: August 26, 2010 Android; JP: October 2011; EU: October 2011; NA: TBA Microsoft Windows; WW: October 14, 2016 Nintendo Switch; WW: November 25, 2021
- Genre: Bullet hell
- Mode: Multiplayer
- Arcade system: CAVE CV1000-D

DoDonPachi Resurrection, known in Japan as DoDonPachi DaiFukkatsu (怒首領蜂 大復活, Angry Leader Bee Great Resurrection), is the fifth arcade game in Cave's DonPachi series, published in 2008. The game was unveiled at AOU2008 Amusement EXPO.

== Gameplay ==
Arcade version screenshot.

In addition to the three ships from the original DonPachi and DoDonPachi, players can choose from three "styles" of play.

=== Ship styles ===
==== Bomb style ====
Bomb style, intended for beginners, provides a stock of three bombs that can be replenished after a life is lost. Collecting bombs beyond the player's maximum capacity grants a "MAXIMUM" score bonus instead. The style also includes an autobomb feature, which automatically deploys a weak bomb when the player is hit, along with power-ups that increase bomb stock.

==== Power style ====
Power style replaces bombs with a Normal/Boost firepower system, activated by pressing a third button on the controller or joystick. Normal mode provides the same firepower as Bomb style, while Boost mode doubles the player's firepower and increases laser size. This style offers greater offensive output at the cost of the defensive bomb mechanic.

==== Strong style ====
Strong style, introduced in the Black Label and Version 1.5 releases, grants the player maximum firepower and bomb stock from the start, at the cost of increased overall difficulty.

== Bee medals ==
The game introduces two types of bee medals, which are still revealed with the laser like in previous games. Yellow bee medals give a large score bonus that increases the more you collect without losing a life. Green bee medals give a meager score bonus but massively increase the Hyper Gauge. Once revealed, the bee medals will alternate between yellow and green until the player collects them.

=== Hyper Gauge ===
The Hyper Gauge is the game's primary scoring mechanism and differs from the equivalent system in the previous installment. It is filled through large combos, close-range attacks on enemies, and the collection of green bee medals. Unlike earlier games in the series, Resurrection has only one Hyper meter, which the player activates using the button normally assigned to bombs. Activating a Hyper temporarily increases firepower and allows the player to cancel enemy bullets; each cancelled bullet adds to the combo gauge. Since point items are scored based on the number of active combo hits, Hyper timing directly affects the player's score.

The game has a second "Ura" loop, which must be accessed by fulfilling 2 conditions: Collect all 45 bee medals in all 5 stages of the first loop, don't bomb more than twice (including autobombs), and if the player is playing using strong style, they cannot lose a ship more than once. There is also a secret Ura route in the game. By destroying the large silos near the beginning of stage 1, not only does it take you to an alternate pathway, but all midbosses are replaced with those from the first game.

Future releases of the game on consoles and PC have expanded and modified the original arcade release. Version 1.5 is a refined version of the original arcade release, with Novice difficulty being a version of the game for newcomers. Version 1.51 is similar, but with a rebalanced scoring system and bombs now being granted through green bees. Arrange A (or Ver L) uses the same hyper system as Dodonpachi Daioujou, with only one ship to pilot (the narrow shot ship from Daioujou, piloted by the element doll Leinyan) Black Label and Black Label novice add a new red gauge for scoring, much harder patterns, and a new final boss encountered at the end of the game if you fulfill certain conditions, Zatsuza. Arrange B on the PC release is a mode where you can play through singular stages with any ship you like, with altered bullet patterns for enemies and bosses. Arrange B on home consoles as well as Black Label Arrange on PC is a version of the game that uses the scoring mechanics of Ketsui: Kizuna Jigoku Tachi of collecting score chips, mixed into the combo-stringing gameplay of the original. Smartphone mode, exclusive to the iOS and Android versions, includes a new Slaughter-Menace meter that would influence a point multiplier, a revamped hyper system where it increases power by spinning the ship with the touchscreen, and a new soundtrack. A Zatsuza practice mode exclusive to the Nintendo Switch release will allow players to challenge the boss with 3 lives and maximum bomb stock.

== Plot ==
After the turmoil caused by the assault on Lunapolis which sparked the "Blissful Death Wars" (as depicted in the previous installment), peace seems to have been restored, with the legendary DonPachi Corps retreating to its HQ in a space-time fold. Six years later, anomalies are detected in the space-time fabric, yet tests reveal nothing out of order, with the portals regularly functioning for both teleportation and time travel; also, the leader of the DonPachi squadron Colonel Godwin Longhener (a descendant of the deranged Schwarlitz Longhener who once commanded the Donpachi Corps like he had) dismisses the matter due to the lack of actual danger.

Nevertheless, a technician delves deeper into the anomaly, discovering that something has infiltrated the HQ computer systems and is using the portals to send large quantities of materials and data to the past, spreading out like a virus and quickly evolving. In an ironic twist, the virus is discovered to be the program originally installed in the Element Dolls six years ago, now reaching beyond the DonPachi Corps programming and seeking to annihilate the human race in retaliation for their "enslavement" (after the war, they met a rather cruel demise at the hand of their own human creators) by waging war in the past rather than in the present: unsettled, the Colonel authorizes the last transport ship to time jump in order to fight back the invasion before future changes. However, he states: "Start over from the past... I never thought of that", echoing the ideas of mankind's imperfection which has always been a recurring theme in the series.

After that, the three pilots jump back in time to 2008 and enter the fray, the transport ship being targeted as soon as it exits the portal by the Element Daughters and gigantic evolutions of the Dolls.

Ending

After beating the game, the entirety of the plot is revealed: one of the Dolls, EXY, interfaced with the enemy computer network at the end of DaiOuJou, managing to shut it down but succumbing to madness soon thereafter. Overwhelmed by the sea of new information, she turned against her human pilot, killing him and herself and becoming the parasitic virtual entity detected by DonPachi HQ; still following her original programming, she created the Element Daughters and the robotic army featured in the game in a desperate attempt to destroy the installation that would start the chain of events leading to the Blissful Death Wars - presumably, DonPachi Corps HQ itself at the time of the elite squadron's birth.

Exploiting their deranged plan for salvation, Colonel Godwin Longhener manipulated the Element Dolls/Daughters into destroying order and civilization, convinced of its intrinsic imperfection (much like his ancestor, Schwarlitz Longhener) and aiming towards rebuilding it according to his idea of flawlessness (an attempt already foiled centuries before by the first DonPachi Squadron). Said ambitions come to an abrupt halt with his death and the destruction of the ultimate fighting machine Hibachi.

As the pilot jumps back to the future, he comes to finally realize how, instead of preventing the bloody future depicted in the series, Next EXY actually triggered it: he/she is forced to watch, powerless, as Longhener is appointed as the commanding officer of the DonPachi Corps with the rank of General, the Daughters standing beside him - the date being just a few years before the start of the Blissful Death Wars. Realizing that everything had been for nothing, the pilot comes to the conclusion that perhaps the future cannot be changed.

The arrange modes have different endings after you defeat Hibachi. In Arrange A, Leinyan appears in front of EXY in her ending of Dodonpachi Daioujou, and manages to console her into giving up her plan, preventing the chain of events that would lead to this game. In Black Label Arrange, the ending reveals that the mode was a simulation meant to train pilots in the Ketsui universe.

== Development ==
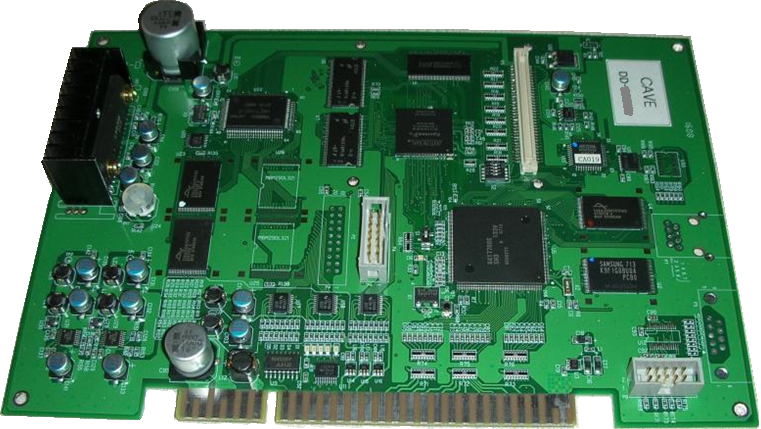
Arcade Printed Circuit Board for DoDonPachi DaiFukkatsu.

=== Music ===
DoDonPachi DaiFukkatsu Original Sound Track is a 23-track CD that includes music tracks and voice samples from the video game, and a bonus song called Image Song (Bonus Track). The soundtrack went on sale on January 26, 2009. DoDonPachi DaiFukkatsu Black Label Original Sound Track was released on February 20, 2010. An arrange soundtrack was also released. This is the same as the CD included in the Version 1.5 Limited Edition and Resurrection Deluxe Edition Xbox 360 ports. The iOS exclusive soundtrack was also separately released on CD.

== Releases ==
=== iOS/Android ===
An iOS version of the game was released on August 26, 2010, via the App Store. This is a port of DoDonPachi Daifukkatsu Version 1.5. There are additions such as an iOS exclusive mode and the ability to play as Hibachi after certain conditions. In addition to the regular soundtrack, the iOS exclusive soundtrack is included. This version was ported to Android in 2011 for the G-Gee service and released internationally in 2012.

=== Xbox 360 ===
Version 1.5 was also released for the Xbox 360 in Japan on November 25, 2010, in both standard and limited editions. This port does not contain a choice between arcade and high-resolution graphics as per previous Xbox 360 Cave ports, it only includes the high-resolution graphics. The modes included are: Xbox 360 (Arcade), Novice, Arrange A (ver L), and Arrange B (ver B). Version 1.51 is available exclusively in the first-press versions as bonus DLC. Black Label (including a Black Label Novice mode, but NOT Black Label Arrange) is available as 1200 point DLC. The limited edition features a different cover and an arranged soundtrack CD. A Platinum Edition release has been confirmed for 2012. These releases are all region locked to Japan. This version was released in Europe as DoDonPachi Resurrection, see below.

Rising Star Games published Dodonpachi Daifukkatsu Ver 1.5' in Europe and PAL territories in November 2011, under the title Dodonpachi Resurrection: Deluxe Edition. This includes Xbox 360 (Arcade), Novice, Arrange A (ver L), and Arrange B (ver B). Version 1.51 is available as 80 point DLC. Black Label (including a Black Label Novice mode, but NOT Black Label Arrange) is available as 800 point DLC. The game features the cover of the Limited Edition version of the Japanese Version 1.5 release and includes the arrange soundtrack CD that came with that version.

=== Black Label ===
The Black Label version was released for the Xbox 360 on February 3, 2011. The Xbox 360 version of Black Label also includes an Arrange Mode and featuring crossover content from Ketsui, including the ability to play as the TigerSchwert and to face down against a new far more powerful Evaccaneer DOOM (known as HIVAC in this game), as well as Zatsuza. A.I, one of the Element Daughters, is seen in promotional artwork posing like Alice from Ketsui. The content comes in two forms, the first is a downloadable version which can be used with 1.5's retail version not including the Ketsui content, the second is a standalone retail game which contains the Ketsui content. The soundtrack for the Ketsui game is an arranged version from Ketsui itself and those with the retail disc can customize the music in-game between 1.5, Black Label and Ketsui Arrange as they wish. The Black Label Xbox 360 disc contains Black Label, Black Label Novice and Black Label Arrange modes.

=== Microsoft Windows ===
The Microsoft Windows version was announced during the Cave Matsuri event on April 26, 2016, and released on Steam on October 14, 2016. This version contains all previously available contents from the Xbox 360, including the Version 1.51 which was a paid DLC on its European release, and the Japan-only exclusive Black Label Arrange Mode, as well as a soundtrack.

=== Nintendo Switch ===
A Nintendo Switch version was released on November 25, 2021, published by LiveWire. Similarly to LiveWire's previous Switch ports of Mushihimesama and Espgaluda II, this version is based on the earlier Xbox 360 port. In this case both the base content from the Xbox 360 release as well as all the Black Label DLC are included. The game was made available in all regions.

=== PC ===
CAVE Interactive announced a new revival of DoDonPachi Resurrection Reignite for PC on April 8, 2026, when they shadow-dropped its official Steam Store Page for PC. It will include new stages, a new playable character and new music. The official release date has not yet been announced.

== Reception ==
Reception

Aggregate scores
| Aggregator | Score |
|---|---|
| GameRankings | 87.14% (iOS); 76.17% (X360) |
| Metacritic | 89/100 (iOS); 87/100 (Switch); 77/100 (X360) |

Review scores
| Publication | Score |
|---|---|
| 1Up.com | A (iOS) |
| Eurogamer | 9/10 (iOS); 8/10 (X360) |
| Famitsu | 30/40 (X360) |
| IGN | 8/10 (iOS) |
| Official Xbox Magazine (UK) | 4/5 (X360) |

Award
| Publication | Award |
|---|---|
| Pocket Gamer | 2011 Best Action/Arcade Game |
