= DoDonPachi DaiOuJou =

2002 video game

- Developer: Cave (Note: Ported to PlayStation 2 by Arika, Xbox 360 by 5pb. Inc.)
- Publisher: AMI (Note: PlayStation 2 port was published by Arika, Tamashii version was published by IGS and iOS port was published by Cave)
- Director: Tsuneki Ikeda
- Producer: Kenichi Takano
- Designers: Akira Wakabayashi; Junya Inoue
- Programmer: Takashi Ichimura
- Artists: Hiroyuki Tanaka; Kengo Arai; Shohei Satoh
- Composer: Manabu Namiki
- Series: DonPachi
- Platforms: Arcade; PlayStation 2; Xbox 360; iOS; Nintendo Switch; PlayStation 4
- Release: April 2002: Arcade; JP: April 2002 Black Label; JP: October 2002 Tamashii; JP: 20 April 2010 PlayStation 2; JP: 10 April 2003 Xbox 360; JP: 19 February 2009 iOS; WW: 9 February 2012 Nintendo Switch, Playstation 4; JP: 7 December 2023
- Genre: Bullet hell
- Modes: Single-player, multiplayer
- Arcade system: PolyGame Master

DoDonPachi DaiOuJou (Note: Japanese: 怒首領蜂 大往生, Hepburn: Dodonpachi Daiōjō; lit. "DoDonPachi Peaceful Death" or "DoDonPachi Blissful Death", also known as DonPachi Episode 4 or DoDonPachi III) is a 2002 arcade game and the fourth in Cave's DonPachi series. The history section of DoDonPachi Resurrection on iPhone calls it DoDonPachi Blissful Death in localisation. CAVE later ported the game to iOS under this localised name. Set 1000 years after the previous game, the plot follows the resurrected Donpachi Corps as they fight a robotic army led by Hibachi. Its gameplay retains the chaining system of its predecessors.

== Gameplay ==
Arcade version screenshot

DaiOuJou follows the conventions of the previous game with only a few changes. The chaining system is intact and works in much the same way. Causing an enemy to explode fills a meter, and every enemy destroyed before the meter depletes adds to the current chain and again refills the meter. Holding the laser weapon over a large enemy will hold the meter steady and slowly accumulate hits. In this way it is possible to create a single chain out of any of the 5 stages.

The controls in DaiOuJou are identical to the previous games in the series, and the same shot-laser dynamic as seen in Donpachi and Dodonpachi are also present, with spread bombs and laser bombs also making a return. However, there are only 2 ships, a narrow shot ship (Type-A) and a wide shot ship (Type-B). In addition, the game introduces Element Dolls, which will power up the player's weapons. The element dolls are:

- Shotia: Powers up standard shots and has a less powerful laser. Can carry 3 bombs at the start, and holds a maximum of 6.
- Leinyan: Powers up laser shots and has a weaker shot attack. Can carry 2 bombs at the start, and holds a maximum of 4.
- EXY: Powers up both shot and laser weapons, giving them intense power. Can carry 1 bomb at the start, and holds a maximum of 2.
- Piper: Exclusive to the Xbox 360 in X-mode, Piper will fire hyper versions of the shot and laser, rapidly increasing the combo gauge. The player can still gain and activate hypers, but they make the shots green and give the player the ability to cancel bullets with their shots. To compensate, the player cannot use bombs (although the MAXIMUM bonus for obtaining bomb items is still intact).

Introduced in this game and carried on in later entries is the Hyper system. By gaining large combos, attacking enemies at close range, and collecting bee medals while a large combo is active (Bee medals now give score based on how large of a combo is racked up), you build up a hyper meter at the top of the screen. When the meter fills up, a hyper powerup drops from the bottom of the screen. Activating the hyper will cancel all bullets currently onscreen and increases the firepower of your shot and laser. Hypers also increase the rate of which combos are built up, as small enemies will give more hits on the combo gauge, larger enemies will add to the current combo chain much faster, and combos on bosses build up at a much faster rate. In addition, if a hyper meter is filled during a boss fight, all bullets on screen are cancelled and turned into score bonuses.

== Plot ==
After the events of Dodonpachi, in which the pilot stops Colonel Schwarlitz Longhener's plan to annihilate humanity, the remains of the Donpachi Corps are sealed away in the moon, never to be heard from again. 1000 years later, the robotic army, led by Hibachi, have reawakened and are slowly rebuilding itself in order to wipe out humanity again, taking the defenseless moon colony of Lunapolis. The world quickly resurrects the Donpachi Corps, and aided by Element Dolls, sentient androids meant to increase a ship's power, are deployed on the moon to destroy Hibachi's army.

Depending on the element doll the player chose at the beginning of the game, the ending will differ upon defeating Hibachi;

- Shotia: In a last resort attack, Hibachi's program turns into a virus and invades Shotia's system, slowly deleting her memories bit by bit. Shotia's last memories are those with her pilot, and she dies with a smile.
- Leinyan: After defeating Hibachi, Leinyan has developed feelings for her pilot. Upon returning to Earth, Leinyan is taken away to be experimented on, but escaped and reunites with her pilot.
- EXY: EXY shuts down Hibachi's computer network, but was driven insane due to the overflow of data. EXY kills her pilot and does not return to Earth. The events of this game will eventually lead to Dodonpachi Daifukkatsu.

== Development ==
=== Black Label ===
This variant was a limited edition release. The arcade board includes the original and Black Label games, which can be selected during boot time. The Black Label game can be identified by the black title screen. After the release of the Black label, the original version is called White Label, particularly for clarification.

A prototype export/overseas version of the Black Label edition named DoDonPachi III was discovered in 2016.

=== Music ===
The music tracks are puns of shooting game companies. Mukei is named after NMK, Toua is named after Toaplan, Takimi is named after Takumi Corporation, Torejya is named after Treasure, Saikyou is named after Psikyo, Seibu is named after Seibu Kaihatsu, Sakusetsu is named after Success Corporation, Taitou is named after Taito, Raijin is named after 8ing/Raizing, and Awaremu is named after Irem.

As often pointed out by fans, Manabu Namiki confirmed that the tracks from the game are the shooting game companies stated above he wanted to show respect for.

=== Graphics ===
With Junya Inoue still a graphical designer, the serene steampunk world of Progear has been replaced with hard sci-fi. The graphic style, especially the ships were drawn so as to resemble the original Dodonpachi. Bullets are drawn in blue and pink, and many of the backgrounds are deliberately flat so as not to distract from the on-screen action.

== Releases ==
=== PlayStation 2 release ===
This version added the following modes/features:

- Death Label arcade mode.
- No bullets mode
- Simulation (training) mode, with a replay feature.
- Gallery.
- High score DVD video from 4 players who completed the second loop of the game.
- Player : 長田仙人, KTL-NAL (A.K.A. Homestay Akira), Clover-TAC
- Score : 1.89 Billion
- Death Label mode

Death Label mode sets the player against a boss rush, with maximum firepower at all times and a full stock of Hyper granted before each boss. Death Label's difficulty is roughly equivalent to that of the normal game's second loop, with a number of alterations made to the bosses and their attack pattern. The most notable change is made at the final boss fight of Death Label, where the player faces two Hibachis simultaneously. According to top players, this is the most difficult iteration in the DoDonPachi series taking 7 years (from 2003 until 2010-09-18) to clear.

=== Tamashii ===
This edition is aimed at the Taiwan-Chinese market and some in-game text has been translated in Chinese. It features an easy mode for beginners (not Black Label). It was published by IGS on April 20, 2010.

=== Black Label EXTRA release ===
The 2008-03-07 issue of Famitsu Weekly magazine reported that 5pb. Inc.'s 5pb.Games Division #2 would bring this game to the Xbox 360 platform as an Xbox Live Arcade title. However, 5pb representative Masaki Sakari claimed that Microsoft rejected 5pb's proposals and 'decided to cut down faithful arcade ports.'. 5pb considered releasing Black Label and Ketsui on a retail DVD instead.

On 2008-09-26, Famitsu announced the official title of the Xbox 360 version of the game, dodonpachi DAI-OU-JOU Black Label EXTRA (怒首領蜂 大往生 ブラックレーベル EXTRA), scheduled for a release on Christmas Day of 2008. The port includes the original and Black Label editions of the game, as well as online score ranking, replay saving, enhanced graphics, and Xbox Live Marketplace content. There is an Xbox 360 original mode for beginners named the "X Mode", where a new Element Doll named Piper is introduced.

The pre-order also includes a guidebook.

Arcade mode - Old Version - is a port of the original "White Label" arcade release.

Arcade mode - New Version - is a port of the newer "Black Label" arcade release.

The X Mode features a 1-loop, 5-stage layout with a new game system.

The game's music can be changed from Mono (from the arcade), Stereo, or X Mode, which features rearranged music.

Xbox achievements feature 50 categories for 1,000 points in total.

The player can get extra credits, X mode, and unlock Config EX options that alter gameplay mechanics by playing the game for a specific amount of time or earning achievement points.

The Xbox 360 version was plagued at released with bugs and problems that rendered the game highly inaccurate and glitchy. It was eventually found that 5pb had, without permission, lifted the source code from the PS2 version of the game and slotted it in for the 360 version while making adjustments as needed. Patches were eventually made with Cave and Microsoft stepping in to aid the patching process.

== Reception ==
Reception

Aggregate score
Aggregator	Score
Metacritic	(iOS) 80/100

Review scores
Publication	Score
Destructoid	(iOS) 6.5/10
Famitsu	(PS2) 34/40 (X360) 27/40
Pocket Gamer	(iOS) 4/5
TouchArcade	(iOS) 4/5
148Apps	(iOS) 4/5
AppGamer	(iOS) 9/10
Slide To Play	(iOS) 3/4
TouchGen	(iOS) 4/5

In Japan, Game Machine listed DoDonPachi DaiOuJou on their June 1, 2002 issue as being the third most-popular arcade game during the previous two weeks. DaiOuJou was met with positive reception from critics since its release in arcades and other platforms. According to review aggregator site Metacritic, the iOS version received "generally favorable" reviews. Famitsu reported that the PlayStation 2 and Xbox 360 versions sold over 19,593 and 10,526 copies in their first week on the market respectively. Both the PlayStation 2 and Xbox 360 versions sold approximately 53,881 copies combined during their lifetime in Japan.
