= Deathsmiles =

2007 video game

- Developer: Cave
- Publishers: AMI: JP: AMI (arcade); JP: Cave (Xbox 360); NA: Aksys Games; EU: Rising Star Games; WW: Degica (Windows); JP: City Connection (PS4, Xbox One, Switch)
- Director: Junya Inoue
- Producer: Kenichi Takano
- Designers: Atsushi Aburano; Toshiyuki Kuroiwa; Akira Wakabayashi; Hiroyuki Tanaka
- Programmer: Takashi Ichimura: Yuji Inoue Tsuneki Ikeda
- Artist: Junya Inoue
- Composer: Manabu Namiki
- Platforms: Arcade; Xbox 360; iOS; Android; Microsoft Windows; PlayStation 4; Xbox One; Nintendo Switch
- Release: October 19, 2007: Arcade; JP: October 19, 2007 Mega Black Label; JP: October 10, 2008 Xbox 360; JP: April 23, 2009; NA: June 29, 2010; EU: February 18, 2011; AU: March 10, 2011 iOS; WW: July 7, 2011 Android; NA: July 17, 2013 Windows; WW: March 10, 2016 PS4, Xbox One, Switch; JP: December 16, 2021; WW: December 15, 2021
- Genre: Scrolling shooter
- Modes: Single-player, multiplayer
- Arcade system: CAVE CV1000-B

Deathsmiles (デススマイルズ, Desusumairuzu) is a horizontally scrolling shooter arcade video game by Japanese developer Cave, released in late 2007. It has heavy occult and gothic influences. It is the second Cave shooter to be played using a horizontally-oriented monitor (the first being Progear, and the third being Akai Katana). It was the first Cave shooter released in North America on a console, and the first one in Europe. Cave has also released it for iOS. A sequel, Deathsmiles II, was released to Japanese arcades on May 14, 2009. A compilation of both Deathsmiles I and Deathsmiles II was released for PlayStation 4, Xbox One and Nintendo Switch in Japan on December 16, 2021.

== Gameplay ==
Arcade version screenshot

Deathsmiles is a horizontal side-scrolling bullet hell game where the players must stop monsters from invading the world of Gilverado. There are 5 playable characters: Windia (Wind Magic), Follett (Fire Magic), Casper (Death Magic), Rosa (Spirit Magic) and Sakura (Magician).

There are 8 stages in total, with one being optional. After selecting a character, the players can choose from one set of three stages: the Port Town, The Forest of the Lost, and the Lake Shore. After completing any level from the first set, a second set of levels, the Graveyard, the Swamp Wastes, and the Volcano, appears, and a level must be completed there in order to access a level from the first set again. After all 6 initial levels are completed, players can either play a difficult extra level, the Gorge, or head straight to the final level, Hades Castle. There is also a unique approach to difficulty in this game. Before a stage starts, the players must pick between 3 levels of difficulty. Level 1 difficulty features easier patterns and gives players 3 bombs per life while Level 3 difficulty features suicide bullets that are fired toward the player after defeating an enemy, as well as one bomb being given per life. On arcade mode, a difficulty level will be locked out if 2 stages are played on that difficulty level. On Xbox 360 and Version 1.1 mode difficulty levels can be chosen more than twice, so players have to strategize on whether or not they will play all the levels on Level 1 difficulty for a more comfortable experience, or play the levels on Level 3 difficulty for more scoring opportunities. In addition, items hidden in the environment such as life-restoring parfaits and extra bombs can be found on levels selecting with higher difficulty levels.

Players have 3 main attacks: a standard shot, a more focused shot, and a "Targeting Area" that locks onto enemies that enter the area. Tapping the shot buttons will produce a standard shot. Holding either shot buttons will slow down the character for more accurate dodging, and the player's companion fighter will fire projectiles that will pierce enemies, dealing more damage. Holding down both shot buttons will create a "Targeting Area", and any enemy that enters the area will be destroyed. The Targeting Area will decrease the player's item counter on the bottom left side of the screen. Unlike other shoot 'em ups, the players have two shot buttons to fire either to left or right, as enemies can arrive from either direction of the screen.

This game also uses a life bar instead of a traditional lives system. When the game begins, the player has a maximum of 3 life bars. Colliding with an enemy will remove one half of the life bar, and colliding with a bullet will remove 1 life bar. When all 3 life bars are depleted, the game ends and the continue screen is shown. Life-restoring parfaits can be found in levels on higher difficulties and extra life bars are obtained at 20 and 40 million points (this number changes depending on the game mode).

== Releases ==
=== Mega Black Label ===
Mega Black Label is a limited (200 copies total) arcade edition of the game released in Japan. It added Sakura as playable character, as well as the Crystal Shrine stage, and Level 999 difficulty level. There are other scoring changes.

=== Xbox 360 release ===
An Xbox 360 port was released in Japan in April 2009, in both regular and limited editions. The Limited Edition includes a Manabu Namiki Selection Deathsmiles Premium Arrange Album soundtrack CD. New game modes include an Xbox 360 mode and Ver 1.1 mode. The players can also adjust the screen brightness, background frame, game screen position and zoom level.

Hori produced a controller for the Xbox 360 game that was an Amazon Japan exclusive.

In April 2010, the Platinum Collection re-release came out in Japan, containing both the main game and the Mega Black Label downloadable content on the disc.

Aksys Games has released the game in North America on June 28, 2010. A Limited Edition was released that includes, along with the game, an exclusive Xbox 360 faceplate and a "Premium Arrange Album" soundtrack CD. As with the Japanese Platinum Collection re-release, the North American port integrates the Mega Black Label (MBL) content, providing a total of 6 game versions selectable from the front-end menu: Arcade, Ver 1.1, Xbox 360, MBL Ver 1.1, MBL Arcade, MBL Xbox 360. The additional playable character, Sakura, is available in the MBL versions.

Rising Star Games released the game in Europe on February 18, 2011, as "Deathsmiles: Deluxe Edition". This contained a soundtrack CD and a CD intended for use on the PC including desktop themes. Originally the soundtrack CD was misprinted and was released as a data CD including the music as .wav files.

=== iOS/Android release ===
Cave released a port of Deathsmiles on the Apple iOS App Store in 2011. The game was released for Android devices in July 2013. Cave updated the game's port for compatibility with recent iOS versions in September 2019, along with the other games that have said ports.

=== PS4, XB1, and Switch release ===
A compilation of both Deathsmiles I and Deathsmiles II was released for PlayStation 4, Xbox One and Nintendo Switch in Japan in 2021 by City Connection. It includes the original and Mega Black Label editions of the game plus the options and modes from the Xbox 360 version, and features an extra DLC adding 5 new playable characters and music tracks from the mobile game Gothic wa Mahou Otome to the normal and Ver 1.1 modes of both editions of the first game. It was later ported to Microsoft Windows in June 2022.

== Development ==
After the release of Progear, Tsuneki Ikeda believed that horizontally scrolling shooters weren't a good fit with the idea of dodging bullets, hinting a potential development switch to vertically scrolling projects instead. A few years later, he decided to revisit the concept, but with an aim to appeal to a broader audience, deterred by hardcore shoot-em-ups. Ikeda pitched a concept for the game that would later become Deathsmiles, explicitly instructing the lead programmer Takashi Ichimura to break out from the usual style of the previous developed games.

Cave modeled the characters around the gothic lolita theme, trying to make use of a then popular Japanese fashion style. The team's idea was to apply a new artistic take to a shooting game, while lending itself to creating "cute" designs at the same time.

== Media ==
On the back of the arcade game poster, there is a template for a skirt blowing game. In the game, the player attempts to blow up the skirt or petticoat of the model to see her underwear. The player scores 30 points for blowing up a skirt and 50 points for blowing up a petticoat. Points are deducted if a pumpkin or tombstone is knocked over.

=== Adaptations ===
- A series of 3 drama CDs were published by Cave.
- Official guide book includes comic drawn by game designer Junya Inoue.

=== Music ===
- Deathsmiles original sound track includes 23-track soundtrack CD with music from the video game (including voices, image song), Windows-compatible data CD including desktop accessories, and 8-page booklet.
- The title track, Burning Halloween Town, contains uncredited excerpts from an edited-for-content version of the 1966 film Mondo Keyhole. These excerpts were also used in the track Brain Freeze from Command & Conquer: Red Alert 2.
- Manabu Namiki Selection Deathsmiles Premium Arrange Album is a 15-song soundtrack CD based on the video game, included with the limited edition of Xbox 360 game.
- Deathsmiles Arrange Album includes 16 tracks with musical arrangements of the original soundtrack from the game, the last 2 tracks being part of the soundtrack that was not included before. It also contains an arranged version of Toccata and Fugue in D minor by Bach, which serves as the game's Final Boss theme.

== Reception ==
Reception

Aggregate score
| Aggregator | Score | |
| Aggregator | iOS | Xbox 360 |
|---|---|---|
| Metacritic | 84/100 | 76/100 |

Review scores
| Publication | Score | |
| Publication | iOS | Xbox 360 |
|---|---|---|
| Edge | N/A | 8/10 |
| Eurogamer | N/A | 8/10 |
| Famitsu | N/A | (360M) 32/40; 7/10, 7/10, 7/10, 8/10 |
| GamePro | N/A | 4/5 |
| GameRevolution | N/A | B+ |
| GameSpot | N/A | 8/10 |
| GameZone | N/A | 8.5/10 |
| Official Xbox Magazine (UK) | N/A | 8/10 |
| Official Xbox Magazine (US) | N/A | 8/10 |
| VideoGamer.com | 8/10 | 8/10 |

The game received "favorable" reviews according to video game review aggregator Metacritic. In Japan, while Famitsu Xbox 360 Monthly gave it one eight, one nine, one seven, and one eight, for a total of 32 out of 40.
