= Jamestown: Legend of the Lost Colony =

2011 video game

- Developer(s): Final Form Games
- Publisher(s): Final Form Games
- Composer(s): Francisco Cerda
- Platform(s): Windows, Mac, Linux, PlayStation 4, Nintendo Switch
- Release: Windows; June 8, 2011; Mac; December 13, 2011; Linux; December 22, 2011; Gunpowder, Treason, & Plot; November 10, 2011; PS4 (as Jamestown+): NA: March 17, 2015; PAL: March 18, 2015; Switch: WW: December 12, 2019
- Genre(s): Scrolling shooter, bullet hell
- Mode(s): Single-player, multiplayer

Jamestown: Legend of the Lost Colony, also known as simply Jamestown, is a vertically scrolling shooter developed and released by Final Form Games in 2011. The game takes place on Mars in an alternate history steampunk 17th century, where the planet is an English colony contested by the Spanish and the indigenous Martians.

== Plot ==
Jamestown is set in an alternate history version of 17th-century colonial America, reimagined with science fiction themes. In this reinterpreted narrative, Jamestown is portrayed as the first British colony established on Mars. The game's protagonist, Sir Walter Raleigh, is an escaped prisoner seeking redemption by investigating the mysterious disappearance of the Roanoke Colony. Throughout his journey, Raleigh faces opposition from both Spanish forces and extraterrestrial adversaries.

== Gameplay ==
Jamestown features mechanics similar to many other shooters. There are 4 types of ships available, each with a primary and secondary attack, and a "Vaunt Mode" which the player can trigger when enough gold from destroyed enemies has been collected. When this mode is engaged the ship gains a temporary shield, increased firepower and a score multiplier for a limited time, which can be prolonged and increased by collecting more gold.

The game is playable in both regular singleplayer mode and in a local multiplayer mode supporting up to 4 players.

== Development ==
The game was developed in two years by the small indie developer Final Form Games, and financed by the three founders' own personal savings. The developers present the Cave shooter Progear as being the closest thing to a direct influence, and say that the animated films of Hayao Miyazaki, in particular Nausicaä of the Valley of the Wind and Castle in the Sky influenced the artstyle. The story's alternate history references Roanoke Colony, and includes associated figures like Walter Raleigh, Virginia Dare, John Smith, and Joachim Gans as characters.

== Reception ==
Reception

Aggregate score
Aggregator	Score
Metacritic	(PS4) 83/100 (PC) 81/100

Review scores
Publication	Score
1Up.com	A
Destructoid	8/10
Eurogamer	8/10
GamePro	4/5
GameSpot	8/10
Giant Bomb	4/5
IGN	8.5/10
PC Gamer (UK)	78%
PC Gamer (US)	90%
PC PowerPlay	7/10
The A.V. Club	A

Jamestown and Jamestown+ received "generally favorable reviews" according to the review aggregation website Metacritic. IGN called the PC version "an accessible, punchy shooter with some clever mechanics at play and a surprising level of depth hiding beneath the 16-bit surface". 1UP.com praised its approachable, escalating difficulty, the 16-bit style graphics and its soundtrack.

Jamestown was selected as one of the "PAX 10" (a selection of the years best indie games) for the PAX Prime 2011 convention. The game was added to the Humble Indie Bundle 4 on December 13, 2011.
