= Deathsmiles II =

2009 video game

- Developer: Cave
- Publisher: Cave
- Director: Junya Inoue
- Producer: Kenichi Takano
- Designers: Atsushi Aburano; Akira Wakabayashi; Hiroyuki Tanaka; Hideki Nomura
- Programmer: Takashi Ichimura
- Artist: Junya Inoue
- Composers: Manabu Namiki; Noriyuki Kamikura; Yoshimi Kudo; Motoi Sakuraba
- Series: Deathsmiles
- Platforms: Arcade; Xbox 360; PlayStation 4; Xbox One; Nintendo Switch; Microsoft Windows
- Release: Arcade: JP: May 14, 2009; Xbox 360: JP: May 27, 2010; NA: May 17, 2011; PS4, Xbox One, Switch: JP: December 16, 2021; Windows: WW: June 23, 2022
- Genre: Bullet hell
- Modes: Single-player, multiplayer

Deathsmiles II: Makai no Merry Christmas is a 2009 bullet hell game by Cave. It is the third Cave shoot 'em up to be played using a horizontally-oriented monitor (preceded by Progear and the original Deathsmiles). Deathsmiles II is also the first CAVE arcade game to use polygons instead of their traditional sprites for graphics. A compilation of Deathsmiles I and Deathsmiles II was released on PlayStation 4, Xbox One, and Nintendo Switch in Japan in December 2021 and later for Microsoft Windows in June 2022.

== Gameplay ==
Arcade version screenshot

In Deathsmiles II, players control a character armed with a magical weapon, navigating through levels filled with enemies and obstacles. The game features multiple characters to choose from, each with their own unique abilities and playstyle. As players progress through the game, they can collect power-ups and items to enhance their character's abilities and make them more powerful.

Deathsmiles II also features a "Mega Black Label" mode, which is a harder version of the game with different levels and challenges.

== Development and release ==
Deathsmiles IIX was ported to the Xbox 360 with additional modes in 2010. It was released both regular and limited editions which included a soundtrack CD. On release week, Deathsmiles IIX sold 16,112 copies in Japan according to Media Create. A platinum edition was released in 2011. The unlocalized Japanese release was made available on the US "Games on Demand" store in 2011.

== Reception ==
Reception

Review score
Publication	Score
Famitsu	8/10, 8/10, 7/10, 7/10

The Japanese video game magazine Famitsu had one reviewer comment that the "console-original mode" was different enough from the arcade, making it a fresh experience. Another commented that they appreciated the visuals and the new characters introduced.

GamesRadar rated the XBLA release a 3.5 out of 5 and called Deathsmiles 2X one of the better shooters available in the Western market.
