= Princess Debut =

2008 video game

- Developer: Cave
- Publishers: JP: Cave; NA: Natsume Inc.; EU: Midway
- Director: Takayuki Yoshino
- Producer: Kenichi Takano
- Designer: Tetsuya Ino
- Programmers: Hiroshi Itosu; Yoshiteru Endo; Tomohiro Kawasumi
- Artists: Hideki Nomura; Yuko Yoshimura
- Writer: Takeki Akimoto
- Composers: Masa-King; Daisuke Matsumoto; Takeshi Miyamoto; Natsuko Naitou
- Platform: Nintendo DS
- Release: JP: June 19, 2008; NA: September 30, 2008; EU: August 26, 2009
- Genres: Otome game, Rhythm game
- Mode: Single-player

Princess Debut (お姫さまデビュー, Ohimesama Debyū), known in Europe as Princess Debut: The Royal Ball, is a rhythm otome game published by Natsume Inc. and developed by Cave for the Nintendo DS.

The illustration and package design was done by Kotori Momoyuki, a manga artist serialized in Kodansha's Nakayoshi.

== Plot ==
Princess Debut opens with the player character speaking to a friend of hers. The former laments her boredom and wishes to be whisked away by a prince.

After the two finish their dialogue and the player character arrives home, a girl and a creature come out of her closet. When asked about her identity, this girl responds that she is the same person as the player character, but from another world, known as the Flower Kingdom. Further, she explains that she is a princess there and that she will soon be required to dance at the prestigious Ball of Saint-Lyon. However, because the Princess lacks both talent and taste for dancing, she wants the player character to go in her stead.

The player character accepts, and from that point forth the player character has 30 days to practice dancing and find a prince to be her partner for the ball.

Depending on where the player chooses to go during the day and what dialogue options are chosen, many different things can happen up until the ultimate ball at Saint-Lyons. The game's ending changes depending on which partner the player chooses and the amount of love between them.

== Development ==
Princess Debut is the first game to be commissioned directly by Natsume Inc. in the United States, as opposed to the development originating in Japan. Natsume Inc.'s president, Hiro Maekawa, conceptualized the idea of a game targeted towards a young female demographic prior, but was unable to find a development partner to create it with. Eventually, Maekawa would meet up with Cave, a company best known for their shoot 'em ups, and learned that they shared a similar idea, thus making them a fit for Natsume Inc. to realize the game's vision through.

== Characters ==
In the opening dialogue, the player character's friend Catherine suggests that certain boys at the school they attend may be somewhat like princes. Each of these boys is described as having traits that are shared by a prince in the Flower Kingdom.

Victor (Vince) [Kid (キっド kiddo)]: A prankster. Catherine finds him cute.

Keith (Kiefer): He is collected and studious, frequently seen reading upper-level books and known for having good grades.

Carlos (Cesar) [Charl (シャルル sharuru)]: Frequently flirts with the girls at school.

Leon (Liam) [Randy (ランディ randi)]: Kind and gentle, he is considered to be very considerate by his classmates. He is known for taking care of the classroom flowers even though he does not have to. The player character views him as "like a big brother you can always count on."

Kyle (Klaus) [Karu (カル karu)]: A popular student and good athlete at school.

Lucas (Luciano) [Hayato (ハヤト hayato)]: The player character's childhood friend. She considers him "pretty cute." He has a bad sense of direction, to the extent of forgetting his way home. However, he refuses to acknowledge it.

Kip [Tap (タップ tappu)]: Assists the Princess in coming to the player character's world and then assists the player character during her stay in the kingdom.

Tony [Coach (コーチ ko-chi)]: He is the player character's dance partner for the tutorial and if one of the princes is not the player character's dance partner. Can use magic to turn himself into a gentleman rabbit.

== Reception ==
Reception

Aggregate score
Aggregator	Score
Metacritic	71/100

Review scores
Publication	Score
Famitsu	26/40
IGN	7/10
NGamer	75%
Nintendo World Report	7/10

Princess Debut received "average" reviews according to the review aggregation website Metacritic. IGN criticized the game for its slow pacing and repetitive nature, stating that "After the initial hump of slow progression players can go through the story to get over a dozen different endings, which will take forever." In Japan, Famitsu gave it a score of two sevens and two sixes for a total of 26 out of 40.
