= Instant Brain =

2011 video game

- Developer: Design Factory (subsidiary of Idea Factory)
- Publisher: Cave
- Platform: Xbox 360
- Release: JP: November 11, 2011
- Genre: Visual novel
- Mode: Single-player

Instant Brain (インスタントブレイン, Insutanto Burein) is a Japanese visual novel developed and released by Cave on November 11, 2011. The gameplay in Instant Brain follows a plot-line which offers predetermined scenarios with courses of interaction.

As a bonus the game includes Cave's vertical shooter DoDonPachi with Kinect support, and a new version of Nin²-Jump titled Nin²-Brain.

== Gameplay ==
Much of the gameplay requires little interaction from the player as the majority of the time is spent reading the text that appears on the game's screen. The text being displayed represents the thoughts of the characters or the dialogue between them. The player is occasionally presented with choices to determine the direction of the game. Depending on what is chosen, the plot may progress in a specific direction.

== Story ==
The story is set in a futuristic world, virtual Japan, around 30–40 years and revolves around the showbiz in the future. The player play as lead character, Zenya Harataki, who has lost all memory of his life prior to six years ago.

Hataraki somehow gets involved in a conspiracy that is connected to his lost memories, and a dark incident from the past centred in the showbiz. To progress through the game, the player use his camera — dubbed the “Exporger” – and take pictures that allows him to get scoops before other reporters, as well as finding clues to his past.

== Characters ==
- Zenya Barataki
- Android C
- Kirin Yatsuhisha
- Kuroe Jakou (Voiced by Miyuki Sawashiro)
- Mikuri Kinshoku
- Fuuka Oujou

== Reception ==
On release, Famitsu gave Instant Brain a score of 32 out of 40.
