= Mushihimesama Bug Panic =

2010 video game

- Developer: Cave
- Publishers: Cave (iOS); G-Gee (Android)
- Series: Mushihimesama
- Platforms: iOS, Android
- Release: iOS; November 5, 2010; Android; July 17, 2013
- Genres: Scrolling shooter, bullet hell
- Modes: Single-player, Multiplayer

Mushihimesama Bug Panic is a vertically scrolling shooter developed by Cave for iOS in 2010, and for Android in 2013. It is a spin-off of Mushihimesama, and the fifth game in the Musihimesama series.

== Reception ==
Reception

Aggregate score
Aggregator	Score
Metacritic	86/100

Review scores
Publication	Score
4Players	72%
Eurogamer	7/10
GamePro	4.5/5
GameZone	7/10
IGN	7.5/10
Pocket Gamer	4/5
TouchArcade	4.5/5

The iOS version received "generally favorable reviews" according to the review aggregation website Metacritic.
