= Espgaluda =

2003 video game

- Developer: Cave
- Publisher: AMI
- Director: Tsuneki Ikeda
- Producer: Kenichi Takano
- Designers: Akira Wakabayashi; Hideki Nomura; Hiroyuki Tanaka; Kengo Arai
- Programmers: Takashi Ichimura; Tsuneki Ikeda
- Artist: Tsukasa Kado
- Composer: "SOU1"
- Series: Espgaluda
- Platforms: Arcade, EZweb, i-mode, PlayStation 2, Yahoo Mobile
- Release: JP: November 2003
- Genre: Bullet hell
- Modes: Single-player, multiplayer
- Arcade system: PolyGame Master

Espgaluda (Note: Japanese: エスプガルーダ, Hepburn: Esupugarūda) is a 2003 manic shooter by Cave and published by AMI. It is the spiritual successor to ESP Ra.De. and is followed by Espgaluda II.

== Gameplay ==
Arcade version screenshot

Espgaluda is an arcade game which involves firing bullets and lasers at enemies, with the ultimate goal being to gain points and make it through all of the game's levels. The player character has an energy gauge that can be depleted either by using a shield attack or being hit by a bullet, which activates an automatic guard barrier. When this barrier is activated, the player fires a laser and is momentarily invincible. If the gauge is depleted when the player character is hit by the bullet, the player loses a life. The player collects gems and, when they enter Kakusei mode, the gem counter drains. While draining, the enemies turn purple, and the bullets and enemies begin to move more slowly. When enemies are defeated, their bullets turn gold, which adds to the score multiplier. When it ends, the player goes into Kakusei Over mode, where bullets turn red and travel faster than normal.

== Development ==
Espgaluda was produced by Kenichi Takano and directed by Tsuneki Ikeda, co-founders of Cave whose previous works include the DonPachi series. Ikeda also served as co-programmer alongside Takashi Ichimura. Akira Wakabayashi, Hideki Nomura, Hiroyuki Tanaka and Kengo Arai also acted as co-designers. Artist Tsukasa Kado was responsible for both world building and character designs. The soundtrack was composed by "SOU1" under supervision of Toshiaki Tomizawa, another co-founder of Cave. The team recounted its creation process and history through various publications.

== Release ==
Espgaluda was first released in arcades by AMI in November 2003. A soundtrack album containing music from the game was published in Japan by Cave in March 2004. The same year in June, a conversion for the PlayStation 2 was developed and published by Arika in Japan. This version included different modes such as arcade, simulation, arrange, and a walkthrough DVD video featuring high-level replays. In arcade mode, players can configure screen orientation and other settings. Simulation mode simulates an arcade mode stage where players can practice of sections under pre-defined conditions. Arrange mode is a PlayStation 2-exclusive feature and introduces more aggressive enemy patterns, new playable characters, an arranged soundtrack, among other additions and gameplay changes.

In 2005, Espgaluda was split into two separate parts and distributed by Cave through the Gaesen Yokocho service for EZweb, i-mode and Yahoo Mobile phones. Both parts were later merged into a single release titled Espgaluda DX, featuring enhanced graphics and a special mode.

== Reception ==
Reception

Review scores
Publication	Score
Consoles +	(PS2) 14/20
Edge	(PS2) 8/10
Famitsu	(PS2) 29/40
Game Fan	(PS2) 9.1/10

Espgaluda garnered positive reception from critics who reviewed it as an import title, with the PlayStation 2 conversion being regarded by outlets like Kotaku Australia and TheGamer as one of the best shoot 'em ups on the console. According to Famitsu, the PlayStation 2 version sold over 10,125 copies in its first week on the market and approximately 17,755 copies were sold during its lifetime in Japan.

Famitsu's four reviewers gave the PlayStation 2 conversion a positive outlook. Game Watch's Toyotomi Kazutaka praised the extra additions of the PlayStation 2 port such as arrange mode, as well as its "Kakusei" and guard barrier mechanics. Edge commended the PlayStation 2 release for its accessibility, "Kakusei" and guard barrier mechanics, scoring system and extra modes but criticized the loss of visual fidelity due to screen resolution differences. Consoles +'s Kael also gave positive remarks to the PlayStation 2 version for its gameplay and music but criticized the short length. Hardcore Gaming 101's Craig Gabrielson noted its scoring system and accessibility in a positive light but criticized the visual variety in terms of stages and soundtrack.
