= High Velocity =

1995 video game

High Velocity - Mountain Racing Challenge
- Japanese cover art
- Developer: Cave
- Publisher: Atlus
- Platform: Sega Saturn
- Release: JP: November 10, 1995; NA: 1996
- Genre: Racing
- Modes: Single-player, multiplayer

High Velocity – Mountain Racing Challenge (Touge King: The Spirits - 峠KING・ザ・スピリッツ) is a racing game developed by Cave and published by Atlus for the Sega Saturn video game console. It focuses on one-on-one races staged on circuits made from Japanese mountain roads, featuring Japanese performance cars. It is the first in Atlus’ long running Touge series.

It was released on November 10, 1995 in Japan, and in North America in 1996.

== Gameplay ==
The game offers three core gameplay modes – King Battle, Vs. Battle, and Time Trial – as well as six vehicles and three circuits.

In King Battle, players participate in a series of one-on-one heats around each configuration of each of the game's three circuits.

The Versus mode allows two players to race against each other in a split-screen configuration. As well as being one of the Saturn's first split-screen racing games, High Velocity – Mountain Racing Challenge offers players the option to partition the screen horizontally or vertically.

The final gameplay mode, time trial, allows players to race against the clock around an empty track.

In all, the game offers three core courses, which can be driven in either standard or reverse configurations. The courses are essentially designed to mimic Japanese mountain roads but are configured as closed circuits.

Six cars feature in the game. Although none of the cars are licensed, they are designed to look like popular Japanese performance cars of the period. Players can apply various upgrades to the cars to boost performance, and each vehicle is available in different colors.

== Graphics ==
Uniquely for games of the period, High Velocity – Mountain Racing Challenge features a draw distance that nearly always extends to the visible horizon. It also has an optional widescreen mode.

== Reception ==
A reviewer for Next Generation found many merits with the game: "With a top-speed comparable to any of the big names in the racing world, this game earns high marks for being an exciting fast ride. There are also an impressive list of options and technical achievements that go along with the racing action including absolutely no draw-in slowdown, a successful two-player mode (which offers the choice of either vertical or horizontal split-screen), a full list of engine modifications, and an awesome replay feature with seven choices of camera angles." However, he felt the fact that players can only race against one other car at a time is a major flaw which keeps the game from being a wholly great experience, and scored it three out of five stars. GamePro's brief review also deemed the limited number of competitors to be a major flaw, additionally criticized the sound effects, and was more dismissive of the game in general.

The game saw strong sales in Japan.

== Sequel ==
On April 18, 1997, Atlus released a sequel, Touge King: the Spirits 2, again developed by Cave. It was never released outside Japan.
