= Peak Performance (video game) =

1997 video game

- Developer: Cave
- Publishers: WW: Atlus; EU: JVC Music Europe
- Platform: PlayStation
- Release: JP: January 24, 1997; NA: May 05, 1997; EU: November 01, 1997
- Genre: Racing
- Modes: Single-player, multiplayer

Peak Performance, known in Japan as Tōge MAX: Saisoku Drift Master (峠MAX 最速ドリフトマスター, Tōge Makkusu Saisoku Dorifuto Masutā; lit. "Ridge MAX: The Fastest Drift Master"), is a 1997 video game developed by Cave and published by Atlus and JVC Music Europe for the PlayStation.

== Reception ==
Reception

Aggregate score
Aggregator	Score
GameRankings	67%

Review scores
Publication	Score
Consoles +	80%
Electronic Gaming Monthly	7/10
Famitsu	27/40
GamePro	3/5 (Note: GamePro gave the game 3.5/5 for graphics, 2/5 for sound, 4/5 for control, and 3/5 for overall fun factor.)
GameSpot	6/10
IGN	7/10
Next Generation	3/5

The game received average reviews according to the review aggregation website GameRankings. Next Generation said, "In the end, PP's racing weighs in at just above average. But with many unique options, including a 'create-your-own obstacle course,' Peak Performance should be enough to entice drivers looking for a 'different' racer as opposed to an improved version of 'more of the same.'" In Japan, Famitsu gave it a score of 27 out of 40.
