= Yanya Caballista: City Skater =

2001 video game

- North American PlayStation 2 cover art
- Developer: Cave
- Publisher: Koei
- Platform: PlayStation 2
- Release: JP: July 5, 2001; NA: October 1, 2001
- Genres: Action, platformer
- Modes: Single-player, multiplayer

Yanya Caballista: City Skater (Note: Japanese: ヤンヤ カバジスタ featuring Gawoo, Hepburn: Yanya Kabajisuta Fīcharingu Gawū; lit. Yanya Caballista featuring Gawoo) is an extreme sports skating game for the PlayStation 2.

== Gameplay ==
The game was packaged with a fingerboard. The fingerboard was to be placed on top of both of the analogue sticks and would be controlled on top of them to resemble controlling a skate board on its wheels.

The game had 3 different modes; a practice mode, a "ramp" mode, and a campaign mode. Both the practice mode and the ramp mode allowed the player to unlock one of 7 characters.

The campaign mode consisted of 5 different stages, divided in sections that unlocked if the player eliminated all Gawoos in the previous section before the countdown timer ran out, which could be avoided by collecting the coins scattered around the level. Once all Gawoos in the level were eliminated the player would have to beat a boss, unusually powerful Gawoos with unique abilities and above average life bars and some sort of protections surrounding them.

== Reception ==
Reception

Aggregate score
Aggregator	Score
Metacritic	58/100

Review scores
Publication	Score
AllGame	3/5
Edge	3/10
Electronic Gaming Monthly	7.5/10
Famitsu	30/40
Game Informer	7.5/10
GamePro	3.5/5
GameSpot	4.6/10
IGN	4/10
Next Generation	3/5
Official U.S. PlayStation Magazine	3.5/5

The game received "mixed" reviews according to the review aggregation website Metacritic. In Japan, however, Famitsu gave it a score of 30 out of 40. Scott Steinberg of Next Generation called it "a bonzo extreme product so foreign in origin and design that it could pass for a Kia."
