= ESP Ra.De. =

1998 video game

- Developer: Cave
- Publishers: Atlus; Nihon System
- Designers: Akira Wakabayashi; Atsushi Aburano; Riichiro Nitta; Yūko Nakamura
- Programmers: Ryuichi Yabuki; Satoshi Kōyama; Tsuneki Ikeda
- Artist: Junya Inoue
- Composer: Masahiro Kusunoki
- Platforms: Arcade, EZweb, i-mode, Nintendo Switch, PlayStation 4
- Release: JP: April 1998
- Genres: Scrolling shooter, bullet hell
- Modes: Single-player, multiplayer

ESP Ra.De. (Note: Japanese: エスプレイド, Hepburn: Esupureido) is a 1998 bullet hell vertically scrolling shooter originally developed by Cave as an arcade video game and co-published by Atlus and Nihon System in Japan. Set in the year 2018, players assume the role from one of the three ESPers to overthrow Lady Garra and her Yaska syndicate from taking over Tokyo.

Developed in conjunction with Dangun Feveron (1998), ESP Ra.De. began production immediately after completion of DoDonPachi (1997). It was the first project by Junya Inoue as art director at Cave, who wanted it to be a visually attractive shoot 'em up for players taking place in a realistic setting with humans as characters. The game did not see any contemporary home ports due to rights and publishing issues with Atlus until it was re-released as ESP Ra.De. Psi for the Nintendo Switch and PlayStation 4 in 2019 by M2.

ESP Ra.De. proved popular among Japanese arcade players and critics praised its unique power gauge mechanic, stylistic presentation, Inoue's artwork and audio design but the scoring system was found to be complex and confusing. The Psi re-release was applauded for its extra modes and character, as well as addressing issues with the original scoring system. The title spawned two spin-offs in the form of Espgaluda (2003) and Espgaluda II (2005).

== Gameplay ==
Arcade version screenshot

ESP Ra.De. is a science fiction-themed, vertically scrolling bullet hell game similar to DoDonPachi. Players assume the role of one of the three playable characters (Yūsuke Sagami, Jb-5th and Irori Mimasaka) through five increasingly difficult stages. The plot involves ESPer Lady Garra and her Yaksa syndicate launching an attack to remove opposing forces and take over Tokyo. Unlike most Cave shoot 'em ups, the characters only possess a shot attack but players can hold down the fire button to reduce movement. A unique gameplay mechanic is the power gauge, which gives players a force field that acts as a shield. Activating the force field renders the player's character invincible, turning enemy bullets into power-up and gold blocks, until the shield button is released and drains the power gauge. Releasing the shield buttons unleashes a powerful psychic blast capable of obliterating enemies and bullets on-screen.

Each character also possess their own piercing attack to deal additional damage but cannot be used in quick sessions. Depleting the piercing gauge renders the player's character incapable of performing a piercing shot for a brief time period until the gauge is full. The piercing attack is also crucial for reaching high-scores and extra lives; destroying enemies will occasionally reveal power-ups and more are obtained based on a score multiplier, which is increased by hitting enemies with the character's regular and piercing shots. When destroying an enemy with the regular shot, the player's multiplier is leveled up by attacking parts of the enemy, while its current level is hidden during normal gameplay but can be activated via cheat code.

After a character is fully powered up, defeated enemies will drop gold blocks and collecting them grants points. Collecting 200 gold blocks activates a timer and the multiplier grants energy tanks to restore the power gauge. The collected gold blocks are depleted after the timer is over. Lives are represented by hearts and losing a heart stock results with decreasing a character's firepower to their original state, as well as the loss of collected gold blocks by players. Once all heart stocks are lost, the game is over, but players can continue by inserting more credits into the arcade machine but with the penalty of resetting the player's score and being unable to change between characters.

== Development ==
ESP Ra.De. was developed in conjunction with Dangun Feveron (1998) by a small crew of nine members: art director Junya Inoue, designers Akira Wakabayashi, Atsushi Aburano, Riichiro Nitta and Yūko Nakamura, programmers Ryuichi Yabuki, Satoshi Kōyama and Tsuneki Ikeda, and composer Masahiro Kusunoki. The team recounted its creation process and history through various publications.

== Release ==
ESP Ra.De. was first released in arcades by Atlus and Nihon System in April 1998. A soundtrack album containing music from the game and DoDonPachi was co-published exclusively in Japan by Scitron and Gamest in November 1998. International Games System originally wanted to distribute the title in Taiwan after acquiring the DoDonPachi license for the PolyGame Master. A port for EZweb mobile phones was distributed by Cave through their Gaesen Yokocho service as two separate titles in June 2004. In 2005, a conversion for i-mode phones titled ESP Ra.De. DX was also distributed by Cave through Gaesen Yokocho. Unlike other releases by Cave, it hadn't seen a contemporary home console port due to rights and publishing issues with Atlus. In December 2019, M2 published a port for the Nintendo Switch and PlayStation 4 titled ESP Ra.De. Psi in physical and digital editions under their M2 ShotTriggers label. This version features the original arcade release and additions such as enhanced visuals, extra modes, re-recorded voiceovers and a new playable character called Alice Master.

== Reception and legacy ==
Reception

Review scores
Publication	Score
Famitsu	(NS/PS4) 32/40
Nintendo Life	(NS) 9/10

In Japan, Game Machine listed ESP Ra.De. on their June 15, 1998 issue as being the fifth most-popular arcade game for the previous two weeks. Player One's François Daniel and Reyda Seddiki regarded its power gauge mechanic as unique compared to competing shoot 'em ups. Hardcore Gaming 101's Nick Zverloff stated that the game's scoring system was convoluted and complicated but praised the stylistic presentation, Inoue's artwork and audio design, regarding the title as "one of Cave's underrated classics" but found Irori's voice to be annoying.

Famitsu's four reviewers praised the inclusion of "Super Easy" and "Irori's Room" modes in the Psi version, as well as the addition of a new playable character. Nintendo Life's Mark MSX compared its visual style with both Akira and Ghost in the Shell, while finding its gameplay and scoring mechanics to be departures from DoDonPachi but commended the Psi version for addressing issues with the original scoring mechanic, the new playable character, user interface and extra modes but criticized the lack of an "arranged" mode and additional music options.

ESP Ra.De. spawned two spin-offs in the form of Espgaluda (2003) and Espgaluda II (2005). Junya Inoue has since regarded both titles as fine for what they are, though he felt that the term "ESP" does not go well with their lore.
