= DoDonPachi =

1997 video game

- Developers: Cave; SPS (PlayStation)
- Publisher: Atlus
- Producer: Kenichi Takano
- Designers: Akira Wakabayashi; Hiroyuki Tanaka; Junya Inoue; Naoki Ogiwara; Riichiro Nitta
- Programmers: Makoto Watanabe; Satoshi Kōyama; Takashi Ichimura; Tsuneki Ikeda
- Series: DonPachi
- Platforms: Arcade, EZweb, i-mode, PlayStation, PlayStation Network, Saturn
- Release: JP: 5 February 1997
- Genre: Bullet hell
- Modes: Single-player, multiplayer
- Arcade system: CAVE 68000

DoDonPachi (Note: Japanese: 怒首領蜂; an ateji spelling of an onomatopoeia of gunfire, literally "furious leader bee") is a 1997 vertically scrolling bullet hell video game developed by Cave and published by Atlus. It was the second game developed by Cave, and the sixth on Cave's first-generation arcade hardware. As with its predecessor DonPachi, the title is both a Japanese term for expressing the sound of gunfire, and a term that relates to bees (here it means "angry leader bee").

DoDonPachi II was released in 2001 from a different developer. Cave developed its own sequel, released in 2002, DoDonPachi DaiOuJou.

== Gameplay ==
The Type A ship fighting Hachi (arcade)

Compared to DonPachi, DoDonPachi introduced new gameplay elements while improving or changing existing ones. The overall background of the game, unlike following sequels, remains more or less centered around an invasion by a mysterious race of mechanized aliens, which the player is called to face throughout its run.

Fighters

The player takes on the role of a squadron fighter facing a race of mechanized aliens that recently appeared and started causing havoc. There are three different ships to choose between, and each ship can be played in Laser or Shot mode.

- Type A: A red (or yellow/orange, for player two) fighter, which fires a narrow stream of shots.
- Type B: A green (or purple, for player two) helicopter, which fires its main guns forward, but has side guns that rotate in the direction of movement.
- Type C: A blue (or black, for player two) fighter, which fires a wide, three-way spread of shots.

Weapons

Each aircraft has a main forward-firing gun used by tapping the two shot buttons, the style of which is determined by the type of fighter chosen. Each ship also has two small floating guns which it deploys at the start of the game. The placement of the guns is different on each craft, which affects their firing style. If the fire button is held down, the floating guns combine in front of the ship to produce a vertical beam, which provides more firepower than standard fire. This also makes the ship move more slowly. An aura is generated around the player's ship, which damages any contacting enemy. If the laser is fired at close proximity to an enemy, the laser delivers more damage to the enemy.

The ship has a limited number of bombs, which are activated by pressing the bomb button. There are two types of bombs that can be used at any time the player could normally use, and there is no penalty for picking a particular bomb to use, aside from the point reductions that using a bomb might give said player. These bombs are triggered based on whether the player is using standard fire or laser fire when the bomb button is pressed:

- While firing standard shots, bombs produce a large explosion which damages or destroys all enemies on-screen, and makes all enemy projectiles disappear for the entire duration of the explosion.
- While firing the laser, the ship unleashes a high-powered beam instead, which does more damage at the cost of range. Enemy projectiles in the beam's range will be destroyed.

At the beginning of the game, the player has three bomb slots, and the slot count increases by one every time the player loses a life (up to six slots).

Power-Up Modes

Each ship can be played with a Shot or Laser boost, making the chosen mode of firing more powerful; the mode is chosen as the player chooses their ship:

- Shot Mode increases the density/spread of standard shots, essentially doubling standard firepower.
- Laser Mode increases the effectiveness of the laser weapon, allowing the laser to penetrate through multiple enemies. It also gives the player a shield against minor bombarding enemies while firing the beam.

When the player loses a life, the chosen weapon's power is decreased by one, and the other weapon's power is decreased to the lowest level.

Collectible Items

There are three types of power-up items in the game, identified by different letters:

- P: Makes the player's guns stronger and laser thicker.
- B: Adds one bomb to the player's supply. The player can hold a maximum of three bombs at the start; this maximum increases by one whenever the player loses a life, to a complete maximum of six.
- MP: Appears after the player has lost all their lives; as such, it can only be picked up upon a continue. Collecting this powers up the player's weapons to full strength.
- Bee: There are 13 golden bees scattered throughout the stage, which are exposed by firing the head of lasers over the area. The value of each collected bee increases throughout each stage, provided the player does not lose a life, beginning with 100, then 200, 400, 800, 1,000, 2 000, 4 000, 8,000, 10,000, 20,000, 40,000, 80,000, and finally 100,000. When the player loses a life, the next collected bee drops back to 100 points.
- Star: Gives 100 points when picked up. When a mid-boss or end boss is destroyed, each of its bullets is converted into a star.
- Giant star: Gives 10,000 points when picked up. In a multi-part boss, destroying a non-critical component causes a giant star to appear.
- Pentagon: Gives 300 points when picked up. Pentagons are only found on the ground.

MAXIMUM bonus

New to DoDonPachi is the addition of "MAXIMUM mode". This mode is triggered whenever a bomb is collected when all bomb slots are full. During MAXIMUM mode, the player's score increases by at least 220 points per 1/60th second, except during boss fights. The score multiplier begins with 2, and increases by 1 for every successive bomb collected in MAXIMUM mode. Whenever a bomb is used or the player loses a life, MAXIMUM mode ends until bomb overstocking occurs again, which will cause the multiplier to resume at the last multiplier value. The multiplier is carried over to successive stages (including new loops).

Get Point System

The Get Point System (GPS) from DonPachi is improved. Destroying an enemy or part of an enemy increases the combo by 1 and builds up a combo gauge on the left side. The combo gauge constantly drains, and the combo is broken when it empties. Using the laser to continuously damage an enemy will maintain a low level on the gauge and periodically increases the combo by 1. The player receives an increasing number of points for the same enemy with a larger hit count.

In boss battles, there is no combo gauge. A combo hit counter simply increases when the boss is hit by the player's Laser or Laser Bomb, and decreases otherwise. The part of the boss being hit can be a non-critical portion to increase the hit count, but not including enemies released by the boss after the boss battle began.

Areas

The game has 7 areas, but area 7 is only accessible by entering the 2nd loop. Said 2nd loop is accessible by completing the first 6 areas on 1 credit and fulfilling one of the following requirements:

- Loses at most 2 fighters (lives).
- Depending on the fighter used, have a maximum hit count of at least the following:

Type A: 270 hits
Type B: 300 hits
Type C: 330 hits

- Score at least 50 million points at the end of area 6.
- Collect all 13 bees in four of the six areas.

The second loop has the same areas, enemy patterns, and bosses as the first loop, but the number of bullets the enemies fire is greatly increased. Destroying the area 6 boss in the second loop unlocks a secret area where the player fights the trademark boss of the series, the giant mechanical bee Hachi (蜂; 'bee'). When the player defeats it, they will then fight Hibachi (火蜂; 'fire bee'), the true final boss in DoDonPachi. If it is defeated then the best ending is achieved. After completing an area, the player gains the following scores based on performance in the completed area:

- Boss hit: It is the sum of the base boss score, and rewards 5,000 points per hit combo when a boss is destroyed.
- Star: 500 points per item collected in the area using the current life.
- Pentagon: 1,000 points per item collected in the area using the current life.
- NO MISS: If the player did not lose a life in the completed area, the player gets 200,000 points for Area 1, and the bonus increases by 100,000 points for each successive area. For second loop areas, the player gets 2,000,000 points for Area 1, and the bonus increases by 1,000,000 points for each successive area.

If the second loop is completed with 1 credit, the player gets 10 million points for each reserved fighter.

Endings

If players fail to meet the requirements for second loop access, they are simply congratulated by the DonPachi Corps leader, Colonel Schwarlitz Longhener, for their bravery in battle. No credits will be presented to the player for finishing the game this way.

Should the requirements be met, however, Longhener reveals - in a shocking twist - that the "mechanized aliens" were in fact the pilot's own comrades (the International version of the game renders this as a "lost fleet" legendary among cadets) trying to actually stop them, being aware of Longhener's nefarious scheme revealed in the true and final ending. Having served its purpose, Longhener orders his elite fleet to annihilate the pilot, and on this premise the second loop of the game begins.

If the player completes the game once again, this time without any kind of requirement except the annihilation of the ultimate fighting machine Hibachi (in which Longhener is killed piloting), in the true ending the pilot realizes that the DonPachi's true goal was to annihilate the human race, owing to Longhener's deranged idea that mankind was a flawed creation to be eradicated from existence. The existing problems of overpopulation, environmental pollution, and arms races were solved by this one-man war. The pilot wonders in the end if maybe Longhener - instead of being the genocidal maniac he claimed to be - had actually intended this extreme solution from the very beginning. The staff credits appear afterwards.

== Release ==
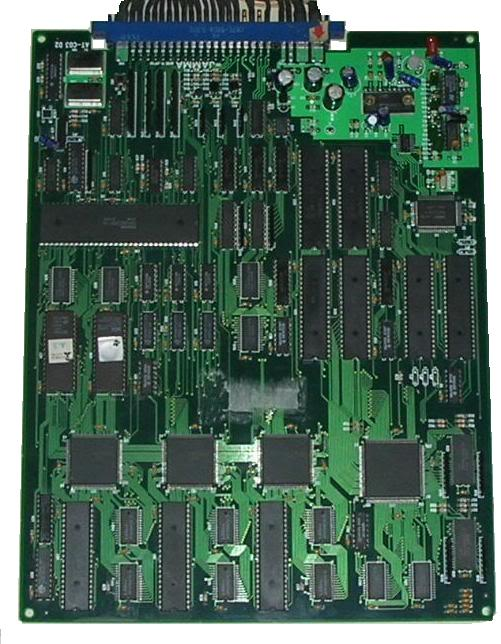
DoDonPachi arcade PCB

DoDonPachi was first released in Japanese arcades by Atlus on February 5, 1997, using the CAVE 68000 board. On November 6, 1998, a soundtrack album containing music from the game and ESP Ra.De. was co-published exclusively in Japan by Scitron and Gamest. On September 18, 1997, a conversion for the Sega Saturn was published by Atlus in Japan featuring an exclusive "Saturn" mode containing a new stage and boss, as well as the ability to change its difficulty setting and enemy patterns, in addition of gameplay mechanics. On September 10, 1998, a version for PlayStation was developed and published by SPS, featuring the ability of manually slowdown the game and a "wait-control" system that toggles in-game slowdown on or off. Both the Saturn and PlayStation ports have horizontal (YOKO) and vertical (TATE) display settings, however the ship must be selected in the options menu if TATE display is selected when playing the latter release.

On September 17, 2002, a conversion of DoDonPachi for i-mode mobile phones titled DoDonPuchi was distributed by Cave through their Gaesen Yokocho service. On March 31, 2003, an updated version of DoDonPuchi titled DoDonPuchi Zero was also distributed by Cave for i-mode phones through Gaesen Yokocho. On June 3, 2004, DoDonPuchi was released for EZweb cellphones divided as two separate titles. On May 26, 2010, the PlayStation port was re-released for PlayStation Network by Hamster Corporation in Japan as part of their Game Archives series. An Xbox 360 version was included as a bonus in the 2011 visual novel Instant Brain, featuring online leaderboards and Kinect support. In February 2012, an unofficial hack for arcades dubbed DoDonPachi Arrange was released online, featuring alterations to the GPS and gameplay mechanics, among other changes.

=== Campaign Version ===
Campaign Version screenshot

DoDonPachi received a remixed arcade edition dubbed DoDonPachi Campaign Version, which was handed out as a first-place prize on a contest hosted by Cave to promote the Sega Saturn conversion, where each participant was asked to submit their highest possible score within a three-day period of the event. This limited edition is also referred as DoDonPachi Special Version and DoDonPachi Blue due to its title screen. Campaign Version runs on a different arcade hardware and is essentially the same game as the original DoDonPachi but with an extreme increase in difficulty and bullets on-screen, featuring a primitive incarnation of the "Hyper Mode" mechanic that would later be seen in DoDonPachi DaiOuJou, among other gameplay alterations.

Only one DoDonPachi Campaign Version-branded PCB is confirmed to exist under ownership of contest winner "ZBL-NAI", although it is rumored that a total of 100 units were manufactured and some are speculated to be owned by other contest participants, while one unit was reportedly present at the "Daytona III" arcade center at Tokyo. Campaign Version made a brief appearance at the first "Cave Matsuri" festival held at the "HEY!" arcade center at Akihabara in December 2006, where two PCBs were available for attendees to play. In a 2010 press conference, former Cave producer Makoto Asada claimed that no additional boards were produced and the company lost its source code, effectively exposing Campaign Version to the risk of being lost forever in case of hardware malfunction.

In a 2018 interview, Analogue CEO Christopher Taber stated that he pitched the idea of licensing a limited run of DoDonPachi Campaign Version arcade boards to Cave, which never came to fruition due to the necessary components for manufacturing PCBs no longer being production and Cave did not have spare units either.

== Reception and legacy ==
Reception

Review scores
Publication	Score
Famitsu	(SS) 33/40
Joypad	(SS) 65%
M! Games	(SS) 76%
Dengeki PlayStation	(PS) 60/100, 70/100
Saturn Fan	(SS) 8.4/10
Sega Saturn Magazine	(SS) 7.33/10

DoDonPachi was generally well received by critics since its arcade debut and later on other platforms. Readers of the Japanese Sega Saturn Magazine voted to give the Saturn port a 8.9766 out of 10 score, ranking at the number 83 spot, indicating a large popular following. The game was included in the 2010 book 1001 Video Games You Must Play Before You Die. Time Extension called the game "one of the series most beloved entries" and "[a] stunning piece of work".

In a 2013 interview with Retro Gamer, programmer Steve Redmond stated that DoDonPachi served as inspiration for his 2013 Xbox Live Indie shoot 'em up Chronoblast.
