= Progear =

2001 video game

- Developer: Cave
- Publisher: Capcom
- Director: Junya Inoue
- Producers: Kenichi Takano; Tatsuya Minami
- Designers: Akira Wakabayashi; Fusayuki Watariguchi; Hiroyuki Tanaka
- Programmers: Satoshi Kōyama; Takashi Ichimura; Tsuneki Ikeda
- Artist: Junya Inoue
- Composer: Yukinori Kikuchi
- Platforms: Arcade, EZweb, i-mode, Yahoo Mobile
- Release: JP: April 2001; NA: 2001
- Genre: Bullet hell
- Modes: Single-player, multiplayer
- Arcade system: CP System II

Progear, known as Storm of Progear (Note: Japanese: プロギアの嵐, Hepburn: Purogia no Arashi) in Japan, is a 2001 side-scrolling shooter video game developed by Cave and published by Capcom for arcades. Set in the fictional kingdom of Parts, players assume the role of children controlling a plane equipped with the titular propelling engine to overthrow the Metoruin sages and their new world order. It was the sixth shoot 'em up game from CAVE, their first horizontally oriented shooter, and their eighth video game overall.

Initially envisioned as a vertical-scrolling shooter and intended to be their last game, Progear was created by CAVE as a collaboration with Capcom and served as their first horizontal-scrolling shooter title, with bullet dodging and enemy destruction being the main focus while adapting the company's shoot 'em up gameplay style in a horizontal format but faced a problematic development cycle before its launch to the market. Though first released in arcades, the game was later ported to mobile phone platforms, each one featuring various changes compared to the original version and has since been re-released as part of the Capcom Home Arcade plug and play game system. The game was later included in the 2021 compilation Capcom Arcade Stadium.

Progear proved to be popular in arcades among Japanese players and garnered positive reception from critics since its inclusion on the Capcom Home Arcade system, with praise given to the anime-style steampunk visuals, gameplay and accessibility, though the music was criticized. It was CAVE's only horizontal-scrolling shooter until Deathsmiles in 2007.

== Gameplay ==
Arcade version screenshot

Progear is a steampunk-themed horizontally scrolling bullet hell game where players assume the role of children controlling a plane equipped with the titular propelling engine through five stages in order to overthrow the Metoruin sages and their new world order. At the start, players are given the option to choose between two pilots (planes) and three co-pilots (gunners), each with their own advantages and weaknesses which determines the effectiveness of their respective modes, in addition to changing character's costume and formation of gunners by performing specific button commands at the selection screen.

As with previous shoot 'em up titles from CAVE, players can alternate between two shot modes: "Pilot" mode fires a strong primary attack as the co-pilot shoots unguided projectiles, while "Gunner" mode fires a weaker primary attack and slows the plane's movement, but allows the co-pilot to lock on to enemies with increased firepower. Players are also equipped with a number of bombs capable of inflicting damage against enemies depending on the number of jewels collected, which increases its attack output. Through the stages, players can pick up items along the way by destroying enemy carriers such as "P" icons to increase the plane's attack power, "B" icons to increase the number of bomb stocks, a "MAX" icon that increases the plane's firepower to maximum level after losing a life and 1UPs. By collecting another bomb stock with three bombs in reserve, several gameplay events occur.

A notable gameplay aspect is the scoring system based on jewels; When an enemy is destroyed, nearby bullets are converted into rings or jewels depending on the player's current weapon mode when destruction occurs. In "Pilot" mode, only bullets nearby an enemy unit are converted into rings, while enemy bullets close to those of another enemy are converted into jewels in "Gunner" mode. When changing between shot modes, players can grab rings and jewels automatically. By having a high ring rank, players obtain jewels of high value and vice versa. The ring rank is lowered by losing a life or using a bomb. At the end of each stage, players are evaluated based on how active their gunner was and the player's overall performance.

== Synopsis ==
=== Plot ===
The plot summary of Progear is explained through supplementary materials. Sometime in the past, people of the kingdom of Parts found a way to become immortal but only with elderly nobles. Among these elders who obtained immortality were Ballossum Pench, Gabriel Hammer, Jimchuck Spanner, Olsorro Slasher and Leonard Drill. They later became known as the Motoruin sages, eventually attempting to take over the Parts kingdom and began a new world order, collapsing the government and destroying villages of the country in the process. As their plans unfold, five children decided to battle the Motoruin using another new invention: the titular semi-automatic propelling engine.

=== Characters ===
- Ring Reed: 14 years old pilot of the Gambler biplane.
- Bolt Boyer: 15 years old pilot of the Militant plane.
- Chain Chairot: 14 years old gunner of Alpha and a childhood friend of Ring.
- Nail Nera Nerouz: 12 years old gunner of Beta and is a last surviving member (princess) of Parts' royal family.
- Rivet Rivera: 18 years old gunner of Gamma and is a governess to Nail.

== Development ==
Early conceptual artwork. Progear was originally envisioned to be a vertical-scrolling shoot 'em up project, before being ultimately reworked into a horizontal-scrolling shooter instead.

Progear was a collaboration effort with Capcom by most of the same team that worked on previous projects at Cave, a team formed by alumni of Toaplan, serving as their first horizontally scrolling shooter game, in addition to being the six shoot 'em up title from the company and their eight video game overall. Kenichi Takano served as producer with director Junya Inoue. Tsuneki Ikeda served as chief programmer alongside Satoshi Kōyama and Takashi Ichimura. Akira Wakabayashi, Fusayuki Watariguchi, Hiroyuki Tanaka and Kengo Arai acted as designers. The soundtrack was composed by Yukinori Kikuchi, with Ryūichi Yabuki creating the sound effects.

The project originally went under the working title Propeller Wars early in development, before being renamed as Garden of Progear (Note: プロギアの庭 (Purogia no Niwa)) and was first envisioned as a vertical-scrolling shooter but Capcom remarked that the name was "too highbrow" and one of the higher-ups at CAVE told the team during their presentation pitch that the project should be a horizontal-scrolling shooter instead, with Ikeda revealing in a 2010 interview that the project was also intended to be their last release as the company was considering leaving the arcade market due to several factors at the time. The team decided to make bullet dodging and enemy destruction its main focus, while adapting the company's shoot 'em up gameplay style in a horizontal format but the project would go through a problematic development cycle until it was released. Both Ikeda and Inoue stated that working with the CP System II platform, which marked the second time CAVE made use of an external arcade board, proved to be difficult as the hardware was underpowered compared to the previous board used for Guwange, with designers using a limited number of colors to remake drawings created in Photoshop.

Inoue stated that the main characters were named after mechanical parts, while the reason having children as lead characters was both from an idea intended for a scrapped adventure game and due to his fascination of kids fighting against evil. Ikeda revealed that the team intended to feature four playable ships but the idea was scrapped due to time constrains, while Inoue also stated that the gender-based firepower pairing mechanic was a repurposed idea originally intended for a sequel to Batsugun.

== Release ==
Progear was first released in arcades by Capcom in 2001, using the CP System II board. The English version removes all of the voice acting from characters. On 26 September 2003, an album containing music from the game was published exclusively in Japan by Suleputer. On 20 March 2014, another album was released by SuperSweep in Japan, featuring the original uncompressed music as well as a collection of official artwork. In 2004, the title was later ported to mobile phone platforms such as EZweb, i-mode and Yahoo Mobile. Both the i-mode and EzWeb versions were split into two separate releases, while another version titled Progear DX for Yahoo Mobile phones contains all five stages. In 2019, it was re-released as part of the Capcom Home Arcade plug and play game system. In February 2021, it was included as part of pack 3 in the Capcom Arcade Stadium compilation.

== Reception and legacy ==
In Japan, Game Machine listed Progear on their 1 June 2001 issue as being the fourth most-popular arcade game at the time. Rhizome's Thomas Bey and William Bailey noted its steampunk-style visuals. The game has been met with positive reception from critics since its inclusion on the Capcom Home Arcade plug and play system. Pete Brown of GameSpot noted it to be "a standout side-scrolling shooter with beautiful 2D graphics and a reasonable difficulty curve, the latter of which is somewhat rare for the genre". Damien McFerran of Nintendo Life gave positive remarks to the graphics and steampunk design. Carlos Leiva of Spanish website Vandal gave positive comments to the game's action, bosses, gameplay and original steampunk setting. David Jenkins of Metro praised its anime-style steampunk artwork design and accessibility, regarding it as "one of CAVE's best". oliveroidubocal of Jeuxvideo.com praised its visuals. Hardcore Gaming 101 remarked the music to be "the most lackluster thing" from the game. Nintendo Life's Will Freeman regarded it as a standout shooter within the Capcom Arcade Stadium compilation due to its depth, visuals and replay value.

Progear was featured in the music video for the song "Ikaruga" by the band Discordance Axis. According to Digital Reality director Theodore Reiker, the game served as one of the influences for Sine Mora. Likewise, the title also served as influence for Jamestown: Legend of the Lost Colony, according to Final Form Games' Mike Ambrogi. Ring's Gambler plane with Chain's Alpha gunner appears as part of a Capcom-themed DLC for Dariusburst Chronicle Saviours.
