= Mushihimesama =

2004 video game

- Developer: Cave
- Publishers: AMI: JP: AMI (arcade); JP: Taito (PlayStation 2); WW: Cave (iOS); JP: Cave (Xbox 360); WW: Degica (PC)
- Director: Tsuneki Ikeda
- Producer: Kenichi Takano
- Designer: Akira Wakabayashi: Hiroyuki Tanaka Hideki Nomura Tomoyuki Kotani Takeharu Isogai
- Programmers: Tsuneki Ikeda; Takashi Ichimura
- Artist: Tomoyuki Kotani
- Composers: Manabu Namiki; Masaharu Iwata
- Series: Mushihimesama
- Platform: Arcade: PlayStation 2 iOS Xbox 360 Microsoft Windows Nintendo Switch
- Release: October 12, 2004: Arcade Version 1.0; JP: October 12, 2004 Blue Label; JP: December 28, 2006 Version 1.5; JP: May 27, 2011 PlayStation 2; JP: July 21, 2005; JP: August 3, 2006 (limited edition) iOS; WW: December 15, 2011 Xbox 360; JP: May 24, 2012 Microsoft Windows; WW: November 5, 2015 Nintendo Switch; WW: June 15, 2021
- Genres: Vertically scrolling shooter, bullet hell
- Modes: Single-player, multiplayer
- Arcade system: CAVE CV1000-B

Mushihimesama (Note: Japanese: 虫姫さま; "Bug Princess") is a manic shooter developed by Cave, originally distributed by AMI in 2004 and later redistributed to arcades in 2011 as the significantly changed "version 1.5". It was ported to the PlayStation 2 in 2005 and iOS in 2011. An Xbox 360 port was released in May 2012 (with ver1.5 as first print DLC). A version for Microsoft Windows was also published by Degica in 2015. In 2021, the game was ported to the Nintendo Switch.

The game has an insect theme as all of the enemies resemble various insects such as beetles, like the Japanese rhinoceros beetle and butterflies. The game is set in various forest environments. It received a sequel in 2006, known as Mushihimesama Futari, and a spin-off iOS and Android game entitled Mushihimesama Bug Panic.

== Gameplay ==
Arcade version screenshot

== Plot ==
The world of Mushihimesama is a wild, untainted one where large desertic areas abruptly change into lush forests, all inhabited by arthropods called Koujuu: such beasts (basically oversized insects) are capable of surviving due to their hardened shells and, upon their deaths, leave them behind for vegetation to grow around them, in a natural cycle of life and death. However, their life force, called Levi-Sense, proved to be poisonous to humans to the point of being named the Miasma; only sparse human settlements were allowed to survive, one of them being the Hoshifuri village, in exchange for the sacrifice of a 15-year-old girl every 200 years. However, the daughter of the royal family, Reco, is apparently the next in line after being given an ornate bracelet by a mysterious boy in Shinju Forest, where she lost herself at a young age: by the day she turns 15, the Miasma contaminates the village. In order to save her people, she enters Shinju Forest once more, riding the golden Koujuu beetle Kiniro (with which the golden bracelet grants a telepathic link) on a quest to meet the Koujuu god himself.

== Releases ==
=== PlayStation 2 ===
Taito released a PlayStation 2 port in Japan in 2005. A limited version also includes young Reco and Kiniro figures. Exclusive to this port is Arrange mode, a variation of Maniac mode where the player starts out with much more firepower but no continues. Also, if the player makes contact with a bullet or an enemy while holding at least one bomb, the player does not die and releases a bomb instead. The player can also cycle through all three weapon types by pressing a button.

=== iOS ===
Cave ported Mushihimesama to iOS platforms under the title Bug Princess, which was released on December 15, 2011. "Hell" difficulty features equivalent bullet patterns to the arcade release.

=== Xbox 360 ===
Cave released an HD version for the Xbox 360 on May 24, 2012 in Japan. The game features Novice, Arrange and Xbox 360 modes. Arrange is a modified version of the PS2 Arrange mode; while no Arcade mode is included, the Xbox 360 mode is identical to the arcade release bar HD visuals. First print copies included Version 1.5 as free DLC. The game was released in both regular and limited editions with different cover art. The limited edition included an arranged soundtrack CD.

=== Microsoft Windows ===
Degica released a port for Microsoft Windows through the Steam digital distribution platform on November 5, 2015. This release, developed chiefly by Cave, is based on the Xbox 360 "HD" port, and includes the same Novice, Original, and Arrange modes rendered with HD graphics. Unlike the Xbox 360 version, however, where Version 1.5 mode and the arranged soundtrack were only available in limited quantities, the Steam version offers these as paid DLC available to all. Additionally, whereas the Xbox 360 port was region-locked to NTSC-J hardware, the Steam version is an international release with no region restrictions.

=== Nintendo Switch ===
An HD version of the game for the Nintendo Switch was released on the Nintendo eShop on June 15, 2021. It includes Novice, Original, Arrange, and Version 1.5 modes as standard features. The game would later be delisted on August 10th, 2024 due to the game license expiring.

== Reception ==
Reception

Aggregate score
Aggregator	Score				
Aggregator	iOS	NS	PC	PS2	Xbox 360
Metacritic	84/100	84/100	86/100	N/A	N/A

Review scores
Publication	Score				
Publication	iOS	NS	PC	PS2	Xbox 360
Destructoid	8/10	N/A	9/10	N/A	N/A
Edge	8/10	N/A	N/A	N/A	N/A
Famitsu	N/A	N/A	N/A	26/40	31/40
Hardcore Gamer	N/A	N/A	4.5/5	N/A	N/A
PCMag	N/A	N/A	4/5	N/A	N/A
Pocket Gamer	8/10	N/A	N/A	N/A	N/A
TouchArcade	4.5/5	N/A	N/A	N/A	N/A

The game generally received positive reviews from critics. Famitsu magazine awarded the PlayStation 2 version of Mushihimesama a score of 26/40 based on four reviews (6/7/6/7), while the Xbox 360 version got a score of 31/40 (8/7/8/8).

The PC version holds an aggregate score of 86/100 on Metacritic. Destructoid gave the PC version a score of 9/10, referring to it as a "must play" title and "required reading for shmup fans" and concluding that, "solo or with a friend, on the highest difficulty setting or the lowest, Mushihimesama is incredibly easy to spend an afternoon with for years to come." Hardcore Gamer gave the title 4.5/5, referring to it as "a classic shooter" that is "beautiful on the surface, but a master class in how to create a challenge that varies in difficulty from completely accessible to utterly insane", stating that the "sheer volume of content is fantastic, making it as easy to replay a mode over and over", and concluding it to be "a phenomenal arcade game and an indispensable addition to any shooter fan’s library."
