= Guwange =

1999 video game

- Developer: Cave
- Publishers: Atlus (Arcade); Cave (Xbox 360)
- Designers: Kenichi Takano; Junya Inoue
- Composer: Masahiro Kusunoki
- Platforms: Arcade, i-mode, Yahoo! Mobile, Xbox 360
- Release: Arcade: JP: June 24, 1999; Mobile Phones: JP: 2003; Xbox 360: WW: November 10, 2010
- Genre: Manic shooter
- Modes: Single-player, multiplayer
- Arcade system: CAVE 68000

Guwange (ぐわんげ, Guwange; [ɡɯwaŋɡe]) is a 1999 vertical scrolling shooter developed by Cave and published by Atlus.

== Gameplay ==
Arcade version screenshot

Guwange's gameplay contains elements that are unique or uncommon in the vertically scrolling shooting game genre. The screen will often scroll horizontally or even diagonally, depending on the course the protagonist must take to reach the demon leader. Each character has a limited bomb attack in the form of an energy blast that can be sent in any direction, and will dispel any bullets it touches. Another special attack involves sending the shikigami into the midst of the enemies, with two particular advantages. First, the shikigami does not have to attack in the same direction as the player is firing, and can even get past obstacles that would otherwise thwart normal shots. If an enemy projectile touches the shikigami, it will change to a pink color and will drastically slow down. If the shot passes the shikigami, it will return to its original color and resume at full speed, but if the bullet is caught in an explosion, it will be cancelled and turned into coins.

Score is almost entirely dependent on the continuous, uninterrupted collection of coins. The player must constantly damage or destroy enemies in order to replenish a countdown timer; when the timer (represented by a meter in the upper-left corner of the screen) depletes entirely, the player's coin count returns to zero. Guwange is unique in that the player may maintain a "chain" of coin collection throughout the entire game, instead of a more conventional stage-by-stage approach. This makes Guwange's scoring system extremely unforgiving.

Bosses

- Fujimura Shizuhiko (Stage 1 boss) (age 24), bearer of the wood talisman. Although Fujimura appears to be an ordinary female dancer, this is not the case. "She" is actually a man named Fujihara Motohiko, who has accepted demonic power to get revenge on the clan that destroyed his family. The attendant dancers are actually demons assigned to assist Fujihara in his revenge, and to kill him if he shows signs of wanting to relinquish his power and reclaim his humanity.
- Madaramukade (Stage 2 boss), bearer of the fire talisman.
- Nekogumo (Stage 3 boss), a horrific monster, part cat and part spider, and bearer of the earth talisman. She uses an abandoned temple for her lair, devouring any traveler hapless enough to come near.
- Kemonoyajiro (Stage 4 boss). A mysterious shrine that has been possessed by a man-eating demon, and is powered by the metal talisman.
- Ashikaga Sukouji (Stage 5 boss, phase 1). A descendant of one of the architects of the Ashikaga shogunate, but because of his illegitimacy, his birth father condemned him as a "monkey's child", and banished him to live with a priest as an ascetic. When the priest died, he revealed the truth of Sukouji's parentage. Enraged, Sukouji assaulted his father's castle, empowered by Magira, the monkey demon whom Sukouji's father had unwittingly invited with his curse. Once Sukouji took the castle for his own, it became increasingly known for demonic associations, only intensifying when Fujihara entrusted the water talisman to Sukouji.
- Magira (Stage 5 boss, phase 2)
- Guwange-sama (Stage 6 boss, phases 1-2)
- Amagizu (age 400+) and Mikoto (age 5) (Stage 6 bosses, phase 3). Amagizu was a nun who was persecuted by the bakufu four centuries ago, and attempted to take refuge to give birth on the mountain that would be called Gokumon. As she bore her child, though, Guwange took the opportunity to possess it, transfiguring it into a demonic form and absorbing Amagizu's lower body. Since then, they have remained in this combined state, with Amagizu voicing Guwange's will to his subordinates. Mikoto, the daughter of Shishin, showed great spiritual power from her birth. Two years ago, though, she was discovered by Amagizu, and taken prisoner by her agents. Amagizu has been using Mikoto's power to amplify her and Guwange's own power, increasing their influence over the spirit realm and an ever-greater portion of Japan. Meanwhile, rumors of Mikoto's power have spread throughout the Ashikaga shogunate, and various lords have attempted to capture her from Gokumon in order to take that power for her own. Not a single person sent to capture her has come back from Gokumon alive.

== Plot ==
The story of Guwange is set during the Muromachi period of Japan. During this time, increasing numbers of people suffer possession by shikigami. Although the shikigami grant great spiritual powers, the strain inflicted on the host causes them to die exactly one year after possession, but a legend has sprung up regarding Guwange, the malevolent god trapped in Mt. Gokumon (i.e. Hell Gate). If one possessed by a shikigami can gather talismans of the five Chinese elements—wood, fire, earth, metal, water—from five demons serving Guwange, then infiltrate Gokumon and slay Guwange, the shikigami will be destroyed and the one possessed will not suffer a premature death.

Characters

- Shishin (age 35), with shikigami Rikiou (age 500+), attacks with kunai. Unlike most hosts of shikigami, Shishin has been able to live for more than a year after possession. This is because Rikiou has made an effort to keep Shishin alive, so long as he kills other humans for Rikiou to devour. The fact that Shishin never speaks, and always wears the mask of an oni, has led to commoners speaking of him as actually being the human-eating ogre in question. One day, Shishin experiences a vision of a goddess explaining to him how destroying Guwange will not only free him of Rikiou, but also restore the one he loves to him—his lost daughter Mikoto.
- Kamono Gensuke (age 15), with shikigami Kirinmaru (age 300+). Gensuke is in training as a pharmacist, and the son of an onmyouji. Kirinmaru is a bloodthirsty tengu who holds a grudge against the elder Kamono. To fulfill that grudge, Kirinmaru has possessed Gensuke. In order to channel the tengu's malice away from innocents, Gensuke has become a bounty hunter, all the while looking for a way to free himself from the curse.
- Hiiragi Kosame (age 17), with shikigami Yatsuhisha (age 200+), attacks with bow and arrows. Kosame is a miko and member of a family of demon hunters. During a conflict with demons, Kosame became possessed by Yatsuhisha, a kitsune, and has been commanded by her father to exorcise herself of him by destroying Guwange. Unusually, Yatsuhisha is perfectly willing to help Kosame in this quest. Yatsuhisha was raised by a demon with little use for malice towards humans, and has come to regard Kosame as a close friend. Even though it would mean his own death, Yatsuhisha intends to put all his effort into saving Kosame from her own death.

Each player gets a unique introduction, and ending after completing the game.

== Development ==
Blue Label

The 'blue label' version of the game was originally a promotional item given to the three highest scoring players at a Cave hosted event. In December 2007 Cave fest, Cave unveiled a special edition of the game, which included increased difficulty in later chapters. The arcade game eventually appeared in cabinet format.

=== Music ===
Cave released the original soundtrack for the game under the title Guwange/ESP Ra.De. original soundtrack album.

Cave released both the original and arranged soundtracks under the title GUWANGE Arrange Album + Original Sound Track in 2010. It features arranged music by a number of video game music composers, including Michiru Yamane, Michiko Naruke, Masafumi Takada, Akari Kaida, and Yoshitaka Hirota, among others.

== Releases ==
=== Mobile release ===
The mobile version was split into two separate games:

- I-mode version was designed for FOMA 900 and 901 series.
- Yahoo! Mobile version was designed for SH53, V601SH series.

Guwange DX is a version for mobile platforms in which the two-part mobile game was merged into a single game, with enhanced graphics.

=== Xbox 360 release ===
Developed by 5pb. Inc, this version was released worldwide on Xbox Live Arcade in November 2010. It includes the original game and 2 new modes, Blue (from the Cave fest release) and Arrange 360.

In Xbox 360 mode, player fires automatically, with R trigger controlling shikigami independently.

DLC include:

- Guwange Premium Theme 1 (2011/07/28, 240MP): Desktop theme.
- Guwange Premium Theme 2 (2011/07/28, 240MP): Desktop theme.
- Guwange icon pack 1 (2011/07/28, 160MP): 10 gamer picture pack.
- Guwange icon pack 2 (2011/07/28, 160MP): 10 gamer picture pack.

== Reception ==
Reception

Aggregate scores
Aggregator	Score
GameRankings	77.14%
Metacritic	76/100

Review scores
Publication	Score
Edge	8/10
Eurogamer	8/10
GamesRadar+	3.5/5
GameZone	7/10
Official Xbox Magazine (US)	4/5

In Japan, Game Machine listed Guwange on their September 1, 1999 issue as being the seventeenth most-successful arcade game at the time.
