= Akai Katana =

2010 video game

- Developers: Cave exA-Arcadia (EXA Label)
- Publisher: Cave (Note: Xbox 360 version published by Rising Star Games in North America and Europe.) (Note: Nintendo Switch, Windows, PlayStation 4, and Xbox One versions published by City Connection.)
- Director: Tsuneki Ikeda
- Producer: Kenichi Takano
- Designer: Hideki Nomura
- Programmers: Tsuneki Ikeda; Shinobu Yagawa; Daisuke Koizumi; Toshihiko Sera
- Artist: Mushimaro Tachikawa
- Composer: Ryu Umemoto
- Platforms: Arcade; exA-Arcadia; Xbox 360; Windows; Nintendo Switch; PlayStation 4; Xbox One
- Release: August 20, 2010: Arcade; JP: August 20, 2010 Arcade Shin; JP: July 24, 2012 Arcade EXA Label; WW: February 17, 2022 Shin Xbox 360; JP: May 26, 2011; EU: May 11, 2012; NA: May 15, 2012; AU: August 28, 2012 Windows; WW: December 15, 2022 Switch, PS4, Xbox One; JP: December 15, 2022; WW: June 29, 2023
- Genres: Scrolling shooter, bullet hell
- Arcade system: CAVE CV1000-D NESiCAxLive (Shin) exA-Arcadia (EXA Label)

Akai Katana (Note: Japanese: 赤い刀, Hepburn: Red Katana) is a horizontally scrolling shooter bullet hell developed by Cave and released in Japan on August 20, 2010 for arcades. A port to the Xbox 360 with additional game modes, Akai Katana Shin, (Note: Japanese: 赤い刀 真) followed on May 26, 2011. Rising Star Games published the console release in North America and Europe on May 15, 2012 simply as Akai Katana.

An enhanced arcade port titled Akai Katana EXA Label was released by exA-Arcadia on February 17, 2022. City Connection ported the Xbox 360 release to Nintendo Switch, Microsoft Windows, PlayStation 4 and Xbox One and released it as Akai Katana Shin on December 15, 2022.

== Gameplay ==
Arcade version screenshot.

== Plot ==
The story is set in a parallel world resembling Japan's Taishō period, where people have discovered the powerful Blood Swords known as the titular Akai Katana. Requiring human sacrifices to unleash their immense destructive power, these swords have been used by the empire to crush neighbouring countries. However, all the bloodshed and power gained through sacrificing close family members has made some of the swordsmen reconsider their choices, and with new fighter planes and powered up swords at their disposal, this small band of rebels now fights back against the empire.

== Reception ==
Reception

Aggregate scores
| Aggregator | Score |
|---|---|
| GameRankings | 76.25% |
| Metacritic | 75/100 |

Review scores
| Publication | Score |
|---|---|
| Destructoid | 9/10 |
| Electronic Gaming Monthly | 8/10 |
| Eurogamer | 8/10 |
| Famitsu | 33/40 |
| GameSpot | 8/10 |
| IGN | 7/10 |
| Official Xbox Magazine (UK) | 3.5/5 |

Famitsu gave the game scores of 8, 8, 8 and 9 from four reviewers, adding up to a total score of 33 out of 40. GameSpot gave the game a score of 8 out of 10, describing it as "a well-crafted dose of over-the-top bullet-hell action." Destructoid gave the game a score of 9 out of 10, concluding that "you may just find yourself ascending to bullet hell heaven if you dedicate some time to learning the game’s obscure but absolutely thrilling mechanics."

Mean Machines described it as a "must-have blaster" for the Xbox 360, praising the gameplay, the "masterpiece" 2D graphics, and the "fantastic" hard rock soundtrack. Crunchyroll praised the challenging gameplay as well as Umemoto's "insane guitar" music as possibly "soundtrack of the year," concluding that "anyone interested in the genre should pick this one up and reward said risk with a small swirling bundle of gold."
