= DonPachi =

1995 video game

- Developer: Cave
- Publisher: Atlus
- Producer: Kenichi Takano
- Programmers: Hiroyuki Uchida; Toshiaki Tomizawa; Tsuneki Ikeda
- Artists: Atsunori Aburatani; Jun Fujisaku; Kazuhiro Asaba
- Composer: Ryūichi Yabuki
- Series: DonPachi
- Platforms: Arcade, PlayStation, PlayStation Network, Sega Saturn
- Release: JP: May 1995; NA/HKG/KOR: 1995; Sega Saturn: JP: 26 April 1996
- Genre: Bullet hell
- Modes: Single-player, multiplayer
- Arcade system: CAVE 68000

DonPachi (Note: Japanese: 首領蜂; lit. A play on the words "Leader Bee" and "Gunfire") is a 1995 vertical-scrolling bullet hell arcade game developed by Cave and published by Atlus in Japan. Players assume the role of a recruit selected to take part in a secret military program by assaulting enemy strongholds in order to become a member of the "DonPachi Squadron".

DonPachi was conceived as a project that evoked the same spirit from shoot 'em ups created by Toaplan, a request Atlus wanted as publisher though conflict emerged as to how close the game should be to Toaplan shooters while members at Cave pointed out elements uncharacteristic from Toaplan during development. Although first launched for arcades on Cave's first-generation hardware, the title was later ported to Sega Saturn and PlayStation, each featuring several changes and additions compared to the original version. The PlayStation version has since been re-released through the PlayStation Network download service.

DonPachi proved to be popular among Japanese arcade players but was later deemed by Cave to be a "creative failure", while the Saturn version was met with mixed reception from critics. It was followed by six sequels: DoDonPachi in 1997, DoDonPachi II in 2001, DoDonPachi DaiOuJou in 2002, DoDonPachi Resurrection in 2008, as well as DoDonPachi Maximum and DoDonPachi SaiDaiOuJou in 2012.

== Gameplay ==
Arcade version screenshot

DonPachi features a scoring system known as the "Get Point System" (GPS). By destroying large groups or chains of enemies in a short period of time, the player can build up a number called a combo, similar to the kind found in fighting games. They receive an increasing number of points with every enemy they shoot down; the more enemies the player hits in one chain, the more points they receive. They can break the chain by waiting to shoot an enemy; the combo number will turn blue when the player's chain is broken. This system brings a new challenge after the player has cleared the game; plot out the stages to achieve a high score. The player flies their selected fighter over 5 areas of various terrain, encountering a number of land, sea and air enemies. The player's ship has two modes of fire: by tapping the fire button, shots are fired; holding it down produces a concentrated vertical beam, but also reduces the ship's speed.

The game has 5 areas, which can be "looped" if the player succeeds in completing them. The second loop has the same areas, enemy patterns, and bosses as the first loop, but enemies fire denser bullet patterns as well as explode into bullets when destroyed (sometimes called 'suicide bullets' or a 'ricochet effect'). However, if enemies are destroyed with the player's ship nearby, such bullets disappear. Destroying the final boss in the second loop unlocks a secret area where the player fights the trademark boss of the series, the giant mechanical bee Hachi (蜂; 'bee'). After completing the first loop, the storyline reveals that the commander tells the pilot to continue the missions of fighting against the fellow troop members until one side is completely destroyed, with the game's second loop beginning 7 years later.

Introduced in this game and subsequently carried over to other CAVE games is the ranking system. Through skillful play (conserving lives and bombs, powering up your ship, obtaining bee medals, obtaining large combos, etc.), bullets fired by enemies will get subtly faster. In the original version rank starts at 0 and increases by 1 per stage in addition to rank collected through skillful play, but in the Hong Kong version rank starts at 10 and increases by 4 per stage in addition to rank collected through play.

Depending on the region released the game will have minor differences from the original Japanese version. The USA release has lesser rank and bombs are refilled after every stage, making the experience slightly easier. The Hong Kong version removes all story and is much more difficult, mainly through higher rank by default meaning faster bullets, and the hitbox is enlarged to fill up much more of the ships sprite. The Hong Kong version was considered near-impossible to complete until a 2-ALL playthrough (a completion of the game going through both loops) was uploaded to Youtube on 29 December 2021.

== Synopsis ==
The premise of DonPachi differs from most of its brethren: the players assume the role of a pilot whose mission is to survive an eight-year-long training mission, where he proves his worth as a fighter and gain entry to the future elite "DonPachi Squadron". The twist lies in the fact that the enemies are, in truth, the players' very own comrades posing as enemies and sacrificing their lives for the sake of allowing only the most skilled pilots to pass the test and survive. After completing the first loop, it is revealed that the commander tells the pilot to continue the missions of fighting against fellow troop members until one side is completely destroyed, with the second loop taking place seven years later. After defeating Hachi, the story reveals the commander's "mission" was to turn the existing army into a race of super soldiers. However, since the missions are aerial attacks, many soldiers have taken battles into air and performed sacrifices, with the many lives lost in the process turning the mission into a success and the "DonPachi Squadron" is formed as a result.

== Development ==
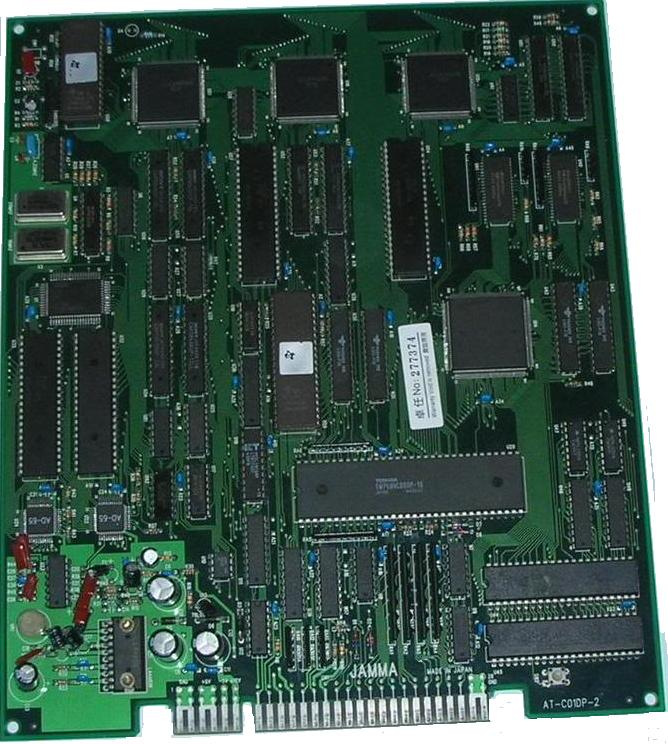
DonPachi arcade PCB.

DonPachi was the first project to be developed by Cave, a Japanese video game developer founded by former Toaplan staff who previously worked on multiple projects before the company declared bankruptcy and wanted to keep creating shoot 'em up games, with producer Kenichi Takano helming its development. Tsuneki Ikeda, Toshiaki Tomizawa, Hiroyuki Uchida and Ryūichi Yabuki acted as programmers, while Yabuki also acted as composer. Artists Atsunori Aburatani, Kazuhiro Asaba, Jun Fujisaku, Riichiro Nitta and Naoki Ogiwara were responsible for the pixel art.

Ikeda and his team recounted DonPachi's development process and history through various publications. The concept for their fledgling project was to create a Toaplan-style shoot 'em up game that evoked the same spirit, which was also a request from publisher Atlus, while introducing a new ship system Ikeda had thought at the time. The staff was inexperienced and members pointed several elements that were not similar to Toaplan shooters during development, with Ikeda stating that there was conflict as to how "Toaplan-ish" their game should be. However, Ikeda also stated he only worked on V・V and Batsugun prior to DonPachi, deeming the two titles as "very un-Toaplan games" and claimed he may not have understood the "soul" of the company well. The voice work was done by a man called "Bob". A programmer claimed the title "DonPachi" was given by Ikeda during a walk from Kagurazaka to Ichigaya.

== Release ==
DonPachi was first released in Japanese arcades by Atlus in May 1995, using the CAVE 68000 board. On 21 June 1995, an album containing music from the title was co-published exclusively in Japan by Scitron and Pony Canyon. On 26 April 1996, a conversion for the Sega Saturn was published by Atlus in Japan. On 18 October of the same year, the game was later ported and published by SPS for the PlayStation. The PlayStation version was re-released for the PlayStation Network by Hamster Corporation in Japan on 9 June 2010. The Saturn version introduces features and extras not seen on PlayStation such as the "Score Attack" mode that acts as a training mode, the addition of the "Little Easy" difficulty level that plays a critical role during gameplay, among other gameplay and display options. The Saturn conversion suffers from loading times between stages and modes, slowdown during gameplay as well as certain special effects being altered due to hardware issues with transparency. The PlayStation port is a more faithful recreation of the arcade original, featuring the same display options as the Saturn release, the ability to adjust the default number of lives and faster loading times. However, both releases have audio quality issues.

== Reception ==
Reception

Review scores
Publication	Score
Famitsu	(SS) 7/10, 7/10, 7/10, 8/10
M! Games	(SS) 67%
Mega Fun	(SS) 32%
Dengeki PlayStation	(PS) 75/100, 70/100
neXt Level	(SS) 70%
Sega Saturn Magazine (JP)	(SS) 5.0/10
Video Games	(SS) 58%

In Japan, Game Machine listed DonPachi on their 15 July 1995 issue as being the twelfth most-popular arcade game at the time. However, Tsuneki Ikeda deemed the title to be a "creative failure" in a 2011 interview with website SPOnG, stating that Cave was criticized "from all sides that our game was nothing like Toaplan!" as well as claiming he and his team did not accomplish what they were going for.

The Sega Saturn version was met with mixed reception from critics. However, fan reception of the Saturn port was positive; readers of the Japanese Sega Saturn Magazine voted to give the Saturn port a 7.1047 out of 10 score, ranking at the number 625 spot. MAN!AC's Christian Blendl gave the Saturn release a mixed outlook. Mega Fun's Björn Souleiman noted its varied but confusing display of colors, stating that the game could have been made on 16-bit hardware, recommending it solely for shoot 'em up fans. neXt Level's K. Koch compared it with Gunbird, another shooter for the Saturn. Video Games's Ralph Karels felt mixed in regards to the audiovisual presentation and criticized its short length. However, Karels noted the number of bullets on-screen without slowdown, recommending it to fans of the shoot 'em up genre. Time Extension noted the game as historically significant to the evolution of the bullet hell format.
