= Cave (company) =

Japanese video game company

CAVE Interactive Co., Ltd.

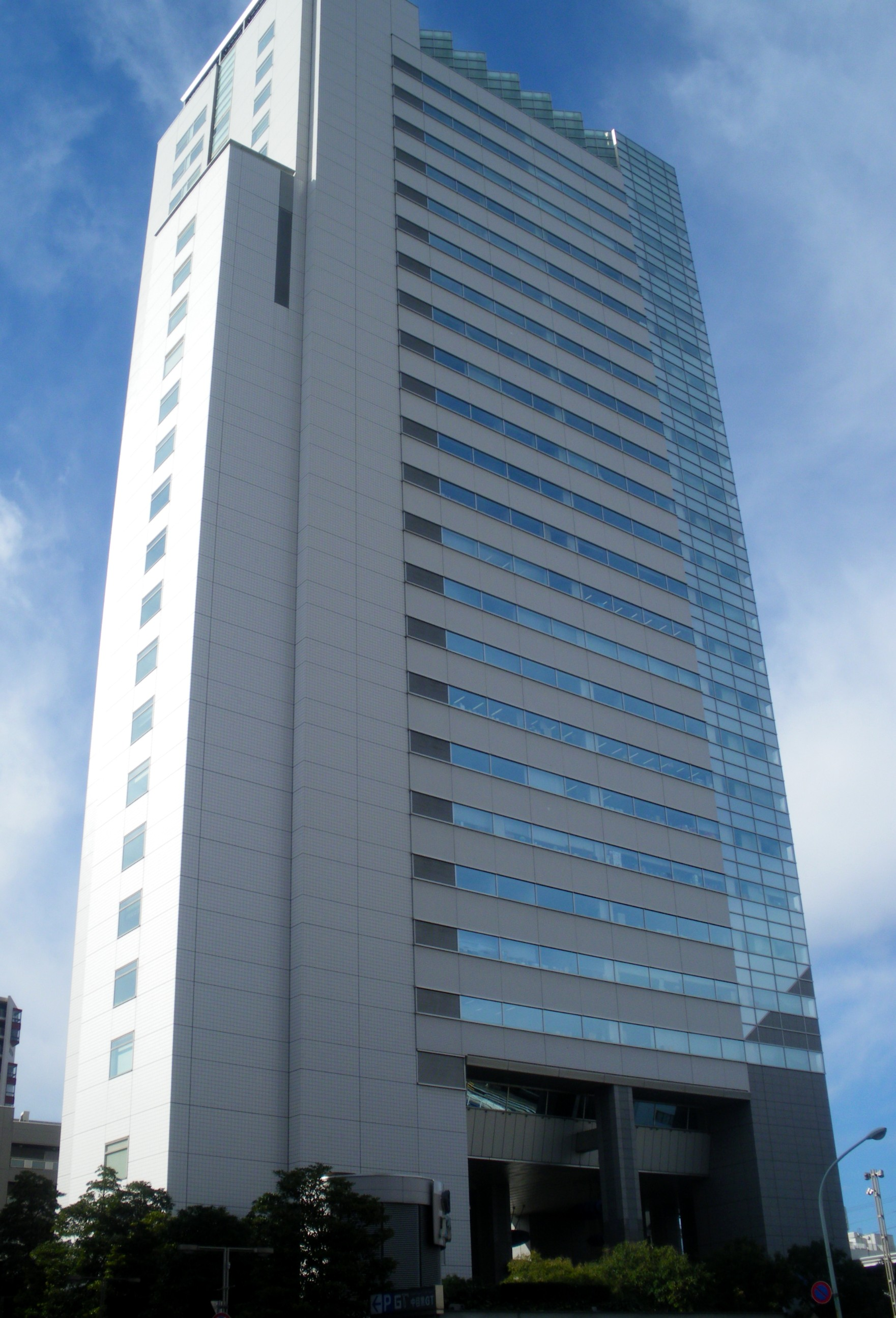
- CAVE's headquarters in Meguro, Tokyo
- Native name: 株式会社ケイブ
- Type: Public
- Traded as: TYO: 3760
- Industry: Video games
- Founded: June 15, 1994
- Headquarters: Meguro, Tokyo, Japan
- Key people: Kenichi Takano (Representative Director, President and CEO); Tsuneki Ikeda (CCO); Shinobu Yagawa (Programmer, Director, Designer)
- Products: Bullet hell shoot 'em ups
- Total assets: JP¥ 1,094,000,000 (FY 2020)
- Number of employees: 97 (2020)
- Subsidiaries: Beads Mania (merged with Cave on June 1, 2008); Mini4WD Networks Co., Ltd. (44.8% stake); Declease ltd. 2014 (9.2% stake)
- Website: cave.co.jp

CAVE Interactive Co., Ltd. (Note: Japanese: 株式会社ケイブ, Hepburn: Kabushiki gaisha Keibu) is a Japanese video game company founded in 1994 by former employees of Toaplan following its bankruptcy. It is known primarily for its "bullet hell" shoot 'em ups; from 1995 up to 2013, CAVE was one of the most prolific shoot 'em up developers in the Japanese market. Alongside this, CAVE has produced a variety of other types games for arcades, home consoles, PCs, and smartphones, also dating back to 1995.

"CAVE" is an acronym for "Computer Art Visual Entertainment".

== History ==
During a stockholder meeting in August 2011, the company changed the English company name to 'CAVE Interactive Co., Ltd'. However, the foreign www.caveinteractive.com domain name had already been established on May 15, 2011.

Key staff members include Tsuneki Ikeda (director and COO) and Makoto Asada (game development department head) who left the company in 2013. On January 24, 2014, community manager "Masa-King" announced that the Cave-World Twitter and blog were shutting down on February 28, 2014, terminating all existing English social media presence in the west.

Within the Guinness World Records, CAVE holds the record for the "most prolific developer of danmaku shooters", having released 48 games in the genre since 1995 as of October 2010.

== Subsidiaries ==
- Mini4WD Networks Co., Ltd. (ミニ四駆ネットワークス株式会社) is a joint venture of CAVE Co., Ltd. and Tamiya established in 2006-02-01.
- ORANGE AND PARTNERS Co., Ltd. (株式会社オレンジ・アンド・パートナーズ): A marketing division. On 2006-08-30, CAVE Co., Ltd. announced the establishment of the subsidiary, effective on 2006-09-05.
- CAVE Asset Management Co., Ltd. (株式会社ケイブアセットマネジメント): Stock management and investment division. On 2006-08-30, CAVE Co., Ltd. announced the establishment of the subsidiary, effective on 2006-09-20-30.
- Declease ltd., International Co., (日曜日の生): It/os management and development division. On 2014-18-09, Cave Co., Ltd. announced about subsidiarity of Declease ltd., International Co.,

=== Former subsidiaries ===
- CAVE Online Entertainment Co., Ltd. (株式会社ケイブ・オンライン・エンターテイメント): On 2005-07-13, CAVE Co., Ltd. announced the establishment of the subsidiary specialized in online entertainment, with CAVE and Kenichi Takano owning 90% and 5% stakes, respectively. The company would be established on 2005-07-15. The subsidiary was established with CAVE, Kenichi Takano owning 92.3%, and 5.1% stakes respectively, with Kenichi Takano as the subsidiary's CEO and president. On 2006-07-24, CAVE Co., Ltd. announced merging the subsidiary and the online business into the parent company, effective on 2006-09-01.
- Appci Corporation (アプシィ株式会社), a video game, music, and online content development company; formerly known as Tabot, Inc. (タボット株式会社) before June 1, 2018.
- Beads Mania: Vendor of fashion accessories. On 2005-05-31, CAVE Co., Ltd. originally announced the establishment of beads accessory division beginning on 2005-06-01. On 2005-07-01, CAVE Co., Ltd. announced the complete acquisition of Craze Company (クレイズカンパニー株式会社) previously done in 2005-06-30 and became a 100 subsidiary of CAVE, which owned the Beads Mania (ビーズマニア) online shop. On 2005-07-06, Craze Company was renamed to Beads Mania (ビーズマニア株式会社). On 2008-05-07, CAVE announced the integration of Beads Mania business, effective on 2008-06-01. On 2010-5-19, CAVE announced the sales of Beads Mania shop and the associated mobile phone site to Tougenkyou Inc. tentatively on 2010-05-31, and the closure of CAVE's shops within Nihonbashi Mitsukoshi in 2011-7.

== Marketing ==
- Since 2006, CAVE has hosted CAVE Matsuri, a yearly festival in which several announcements regarding company affairs are made. Also, some titles are offered exclusively at this event such as Mushihimesama Cave Matsuri ver 1.5. The most recent festival was held on April 16, 2018.
- A character of the same name represents the company within the company-collaborative RPG Hyperdimension Neptunia Mk2.

== Games developed ==
=== Arcade games ===
CAVE's arcade titles have used various arcade boards over the years. Earlier titles used a CAVE-designed board based on a Motorola 68000 CPU, with later releases moving over to the PolyGame Master hardware, and then, starting with Mushihimesama, onto boards based on the Hitachi SH-3 CPU. CAVE dabbled in PC-based hardware for Deathsmiles II, but switched back to SH-3 for later titles.

Game	Year	Hardware	Publisher(s)
DonPachi	1995	CAVE 68000	Atlus
Othello Derby	1995	Toaplan Version 2	Tsukuda Original
DoDonPachi	1997	CAVE 68000	Atlus
Steep Slope Sliders	1998	Sega ST-V	Capcom
Puzzle Uo Poko	1998	CAVE 68000	Jaleco
ESP Ra.De.	1998	CAVE 68000	Atlus
Dangun Feveron / Fever S.O.S.	1998	CAVE 68000	Nihon System
Guwange	1999	CAVE 68000	Atlus
Progear: Storm of Progear	2001	CPS2	Capcom
DoDonPachi DaiOuJou	2002	PGM	AMI
DoDonPachi DaiOuJou Black Label	2002	PGM	AMI
Ketsui: Kizuna Jigoku Tachi	2003	PGM	AMI
Espgaluda	2003	PGM	AMI
Mushihimesama	2004	CAVE CV1000B	AMI
Ibara	2005	CAVE CV1000B	AMI
Puzzle! Mushihimetama	2005	CAVE CV1000B	AMI
Espgaluda II	2005	CAVE CV1000B	AMI
Ibara Kuro: Black Label	2006	CAVE CV1000B	AMI
Pink Sweets: Ibara Sorekara	2006	CAVE CV1000B	AMI
Mushihimesama Futari	2006	CAVE CV1000B	AMI
Mushihimesama Futari Ver 1.5	2006	CAVE CV1000B	AMI
Muchi Muchi Pork!	2007	CAVE CV1000B	AMI
Deathsmiles	2007	CAVE CV1000B	AMI
Mushihimesama Futari Black Label	2007	CAVE CV1000B	AMI
DoDonPachi DaiFukkatsu	2008	CAVE CV1000D	AMI
DoDonPachi DaiFukkatsu Ver 1.5	2008	CAVE CV1000D	AMI
Deathsmiles Mega Black Label	2008	CAVE CV1000D	AMI
Omatsuri Yasan: Kingyo Sukui	2009	CAVE PC	CAVE
Omatsuri Yasan: Ganso Takoyaki	2009	CAVE PC	CAVE
Deathsmiles II: Makai no Merry Christmas	2009	CAVE PC	CAVE
DoDonPachi DaiFukkatsu Black Label	2010	CAVE CV1000D	CAVE
Akai Katana	2010	CAVE CV1000D	CAVE
Mushihimesama Ver 1.5	2011	CAVE CV1000B	CAVE
DoDonPachi SaiDaiOuJou	2012	CAVE CV1000D	CAVE
Akai Katana for NESiCAxLive	2012	TAITO Type X^{2}	TAITO
DoDonPachi SaiDaiOuJou EXA Label	2020	exA-Arcadia	exA-Arcadia
Akai Katana EXA Label	2021	exA-Arcadia	exA-Arcadia

=== Console games ===
On March 28, 2013 Cave released a special bundle called Cave Shooting Collection which contained all Xbox 360 titles published by it to that date (Akai Katana, Deathsmiles, Deathsmiles IIX, DoDonPachi Daifukkatsu Black Label, DoDonPachi Daifukkatsu Ver 1.5, Espgaluda II, Muchi Muchi Pork & Pink Sweets, Mushihimesama, Mushihimesama Futari Ver 1.5, and a download voucher for Guwange on XBLA), a disc containing all DLC for the aforementioned titles, 7 "superplay" DVDs, and a 10-disc soundtrack selection with songs from all of the included games except Guwange. This bundle was re-released as Cave Shooting Collection Complete on May 22, 2014 including DoDonPachi SaiDaiOuJou but not including the soundtrack collection.

Game	Year	System	Publisher(s)	JP	NA	EU
Delisoba Deluxe	1995	Sega Saturn	TBS	Yes	No	No
Touge: King the Spirits	1995	Sega Saturn	Atlus	Yes	Yes	No
DonPachi	1996	Sega Saturn	Atlus	Yes	No	No
DonPachi	1996	PlayStation	SPS	Yes	No	No
Touge: King the Spirits 2	1997	Sega Saturn	Atlus	Yes	No	No
DoDonPachi	1997	Sega Saturn	Atlus	Yes	No	No
Steep Slope Sliders	1997	Sega Saturn	Sega	Yes	Yes	Yes
Peak Performance	1997	PlayStation	Atlus	Yes	Yes	Yes
Trick'N Snowboarder	1999	PlayStation	Capcom	Yes	Yes	Yes
Touge Max 2	1999	PlayStation	Atlus	Yes	No	No
Touge Max G	2000	PlayStation	Atlus	Yes	No	No
Snowboard Heaven	2000	PlayStation 2	Capcom	Yes	No	No
Yanya Caballista: City Skater	2001	PlayStation 2	Koei	Yes	Yes	No
DoDonPachi DaiOuJou	2003	PlayStation 2	Arika	Yes	No	No
Espgaluda	2004	PlayStation 2	Arika	Yes	No	No
Mushihimesama	2005	PlayStation 2	Taito	Yes	No	No
Ibara	2006	PlayStation 2	Taito	Yes	No	No
Shin Megami Tensei: Imagine	2007	Microsoft Windows	Atlus	Yes	Yes	Yes
Princess Debut	2008	Nintendo DS	Cave (JP); Natsume Inc. (NA); Midway (EU)	Yes	Yes	Yes
Ketsui Death Label	2008	Nintendo DS	Arika	Yes	No^{a}	No^{a}
DoDonPachi DaiOuJou Black Label Extra	2009	Xbox 360	5pb.	Yes	No	No
Deathsmiles	2009	Xbox 360	Cave (JP); Aksys Games (NA); Rising Star Games (EU)	Yes	Yes	Yes
Mushihimesama Futari Ver 1.5	2009	Xbox 360	Cave	Yes	No^{a}	No^{a}
Espgaluda II Black Label	2010	Xbox 360	Cave	Yes	No^{b}	No^{b}
Ketsui: Kizuna Jigoku Tachi Extra	2010	Xbox 360	5pb.	Yes	No	No
Deathsmiles IIX: Makai no Merry Christmas	2010	Xbox 360	Cave	Yes	Yes	No
Guwange	2010	XBLA	Cave	Yes	Yes	Yes
DoDonPachi Resurrection	2010	Xbox 360	Cave (JP); Rising Star Games (EU)	Yes	No^{c}	Yes
DoDonPachi DaiFukkatsu Black Label	2011	Xbox 360	Cave	Yes	No	No
Muchi Muchi Pork! & Pink Sweets: Ibara Sore Kara	2011	Xbox 360	Cave	Yes	No^{a}	No^{a}
Nin2-Jump	2011	XBLA	Cave	Yes	Yes	Yes
Akai Katana Shin	2011	Xbox 360	Cave (JP); Rising Star Games (NA & EU)	Yes	Yes	Yes
Instant Brain	2011	Xbox 360	Cave	Yes	No	No
DoDonPachi DaiFukkatsu Double Pack	2012	Xbox 360	Cave	Yes	No	No
Mushihimesama HD	2012	Xbox 360	Cave	Yes	No	No
DoDonPachi SaiDaiOuJou	2013	Xbox 360	Cave	Yes	No^{a}	No^{a}
Ketsui: Kizuna Jigoku Tachi Extra	2013	PlayStation 3	5pb.	Yes	No^{a}	No^{a}
Mushihimesama HD	2015	Microsoft Windows	Degica	Yes	Yes	Yes
Deathsmiles	2016	Microsoft Windows	Degica	Yes	Yes	Yes
DoDonPachi Resurrection	2016	Microsoft Windows	Degica	Yes	Yes	Yes
Dangun Feveron	2017	PlayStation 4, Xbox One	M2	Yes	Yes	Yes
Ketsui: Kizuna Jigoku Tachi	2018	PlayStation 4	M2	Yes	Yes	No
ESP Ra.De. Psi	2019	PlayStation 4, Nintendo Switch	M2	Yes	TBA^{a}	TBA^{a}
Mushihimesama HD	2021	Nintendo Switch	LiveWire	Yes	Yes	Yes
Espgaluda II	2021	Nintendo Switch	LiveWire	Yes	Yes	Yes
DoDonPachi Resurrection	2021	Nintendo Switch	LiveWire	Yes	Yes	Yes
Deathsmiles I･II	2021	Nintendo Switch, PlayStation 4, Xbox One, Microsoft Windows	City Connection	Yes	Yes	Yes
Akai Katana Shin	2022	Nintendo Switch, PlayStation 4, Xbox One, Microsoft Windows	City Connection	Yes	Yes	Yes
DoDonPachi DaiOuJou	2023	PlayStation 4, Nintendo Switch	M2	Yes	No	No
DoDonPachi SaiDaiOuJou	2024	Nintendo Switch	LiveWire	Yes	Yes	Yes

Notes

^a Not released outside Japan but release is region-free.
^b Not released outside Japan but regular edition release is region-free.
^c Not released outside Japan and Europe but release is region-free.

=== Mobile games ===
Game	Year	Platform	Publisher(s)
Ninja Tower	2004	Mobile	Nuvo Studios
Loveny's Picture Book	2006	Mobile	Cave
Switch	2008	Mobile	Cave
Espgaluda II	2010	iOS	Cave
DoDonPachi Resurrection	2010	iOS	Cave
Mushihimesama Bug Panic	2010	iOS	Cave
Deathsmiles	2011	iOS	Cave
Espgaluda II HD	2011	iOS	Cave
Bug Princess	2011	iOS	Cave
DoDonPachi Blissful Death	2012	iOS	Cave
DoDonPachi Resurrection HD	2012	iOS	Cave
Bug Princess 2	2012	iOS	Cave
Bug Princess 2 Black Label	2012	iOS	Cave
Espgaluda II	2012	Android	G-Gee
DoDonPachi Resurrection	2012	Android	G-Gee
DoDonPachi Maximum	2012	iOS, Windows Phone	Cave
Mushihimesama BUG PANIC	2013	Android	G-Gee
Deathsmiles	2013	Android	G-Gee
Hello Kitty Puzzle Chains	2014	iOS, Android	Mobage
Don Paccin	2014	iOS, Android	Mobage
PSYCHO-PASS Koushiki Appli	2015	iOS, Android	Cave
Gothic wa Mahou Otome	2015	iOS, Android	Cave
DoDonPachi Ichimen Bancho	2015	iOS, Android	Cave
Cube Drop	2016	iOS, Android	Cave
Lord of Dungeon	2017	iOS, Android	Cave
Sangoku Justice	2018	iOS, Android	Cave
World Witches United Front	2020	iOS, Android	Cave
Touhou Gensou Eclipse	2023	iOS, Android	Cave

== See also ==
- Toaplan
