= Espgaluda II =

2005 video game

- Developer: Cave
- Publishers: JP: AMI (arcade); WW: Cave Live Wire (Switch)
- Designers: Masaki Hirooka; Hideki Nomura; Toshiyuki Kuroiwa
- Composers: Manabu Namiki; Mitsuhiro Kaneda; Ryu Umemoto
- Series: Espgaluda
- Platforms: Arcade, i-mode, Xbox 360, iOS, Android, Nintendo Switch
- Release: Arcade: JP: November 25, 2005; Mobile Phone i-mode: JP: 2006; Xbox 360: JP: February 25, 2010; JP: April 28, 2011 (Platinum Collection); JP: March 6, 2012 (Games On Demand); Android: WW: April 10, 2010; iOS: WW: April 10, 2010; Nintendo Switch: WW: September 9, 2021
- Genre: Bullet hell
- Modes: Single-player, multiplayer
- Arcade system: CAVE CV1000-B

Espgaluda II (エスプガルーダII) is a bullet hell shoot'em up originally released by Cave in the arcades in 2005 as a sequel to Espgaluda. An Xbox 360 release, titled Espgaluda II Black Label, was released in 2010 in Japan. It was released in September 2021 for the Nintendo Switch worldwide.

== Gameplay ==
Arcade version screenshot

Instead of having to repeatedly tap the shot button for rapid fire, the feature is on by default. In most of Cave's other manic shooter games, rapid fire is usually an option that must be enabled through the game's BIOS by an arcade operator.

The game still utilizes the Kakusei, or Awakening, mode from the first game, where enemies and bullets are slowed down at the cost of collectible green gems, or Seireiseki. In this mode, any enemies that are defeated have their remaining bullets on screen transformed into gold ingots that can be collected to boost the player's score. Espgaluda II also adds the ability for enemies to release yet another set of shots when they are defeated. These bullets are destroyed when destroying another enemy, which in turn creates another wave of bullets. During that attack phase, the score multiplier for destroyed bullets can be raised up to 500. Another returning feature from the first game is the Guard Barrier, which absorbs enemy attacks at the expense of a Guard Barrier Gauge. When the player is hit by an enemy bullet, the Guard Barrier is automatically activated; the Guard Barrier is always used until its gauge is depleted. Players can gain extra lives after earning 15 million and 35 million points, or by obtaining the life extend item in stage 3.

The Xbox 360 version features online leaderboards, redrawn HD graphics, the ability to save replays, and has the following modes: Arcade Mode, Xbox 360 Mode (identical to arcade but with HD graphics), Novice Mode, Black Label Novice Mode (Seseri is playable), Black Label (Seseri is playable), Arrange Mode, Omake Mode (unlocked after beating any mode on any settings).

The iOS/Android versions feature controls unique to the iPhone/iPod Touch, allowing players to unleash an Awakening Pulse against the enemy by touching parts of the screen. Using this attack in conjunction with the high risk, high return scoring system allows the player to maximize his or her high score. The game also features the classic Arcade mode, three difficulty settings and three control settings.

== Plot ==
The game takes place in a fictional land called Soma, three years after a massive war known as the Great Shinra War devastated the land and killed most of its plant life. Humanity is forced to pull their efforts together for the sake of survival and reforestation. Using new found technology, an alchemist named Hiodoshi spearheaded a project called Project Espgaluda, which gathered youths and used them as experimental test subjects for artificial armored wings. They were then called Galuda, named after the mythical bird of legend.

Ageha and Tateha were two of the subjects who escaped during the project. At the end of Espgaluda, they were reunited with their mother and lived peacefully after going into hiding. Espgaluda II begins when they are discovered.

=== Characters ===
Protagonists:

- Asagi is a 12-year-old girl who was the third Galuda to be produced from the project. She has the weakest normal shot out of the three main characters. She fires vertical shots in shot mode. In rapier mode, enemy marked by search spirit is automatically targeted. She is voiced by Ikumi Fujiwara, while her male counterpart is voiced by Yuki Fuji.
- Ageha is Tateha's older brother. He is a 21-year-old man who was also the protagonist from the first game. In game, his normal shot is a strong concentrated forward shot. In shot mode, moving joystick horizontally causes the shots to move diagonally. He is voiced by Shuya Kishimoto, and his female counterpart is voiced by Aiko Igarashi.
- Tateha is a 19-year-old girl also appearing from the first game. She is Ageha's younger sister. She wields a wide-angled forward shot. Fires in wide angle formation in shot mode, forward formation in rapier mode, which also shoots through enemies. She is voiced by Emi Kawauchi, and her male counterpart is voiced by Kyo Sakai.

Antagonists:

- Tsubame is Soma's 10-year-old prince. He is the son of Soma's ruler and is the boss of Stage 1.
- Madara is a 27-year-old commissioned officer of the Soma Army's Mechanized Unit. He is the mid-boss of Stage 2 and the boss of Stage 4.
- Janome is an 11-year-old princess of Soma. She is the boss of Stage 3.
- Seseri is a survivor of the Great Shinra War. Soma saved her homeland from the brink of destruction. She is 15 years old. Seseri is the boss of Stage 5.
- Kujaku is the second boss of Stage 6, formed from a fusion of Soma's royal siblings, Tsubame and Janome.

== Release ==
The game's soundtrack was released on July 26, 2006. It was composed by Manabu Namiki and Mitsuhiro Kaneda and was published by Cave.

Following the region-free release of Mushihime-sama Futari, Makoto Asada of Cave said that the standard edition of Espgaluda II Black Label will be region-free, allowing North American and European players to import the game. Platinum edition is also region free but the Limited Edition, which includes a soundtrack and Xbox 360 faceplate, is not region-free. The first print of the standard edition also includes a soundtrack.

The iOS version of the game was only supported on iPhone 3GS/iPod Touch (late 2009 32 GB and 64 GB), iPhone 4 and iPad. Espgaluda II HD version was also available for the iPad 2.

== Reception ==
Famitsu magazine awarded the Xbox 360 release, Espgaluda II Black Label, a score of 30/40 based on four reviews (8/8/7/7).
