= Bishōjo Senshi Sailor Moon S: Jōgai Rantō!? Shuyaku Sōdatsusen =

1994 video game

- Developer: Arc System Works
- Publisher: Angel
- Composer: Takanori Arisawa
- Series: Sailor Moon
- Platform: Super Famicom
- Release: JP: 16 December 1994
- Genre: Fighting
- Modes: Single-player, multiplayer

Bishōjo Senshi Sailor Moon S: Jōgai Rantō!? Shuyaku Sōdatsusen (Note: Japanese: 美少女戦士セーラームーンS・場外乱闘!?主役争奪戦, Hepburn: Bishōjo Senshi Sērā Mūn Sūpā: Jōgai Rantō!? Shuyaku Sōdatsusen; lit. "Pretty Soldier Sailor Moon S: Out of Field Brawl!? Contest for the Lead Part") is a 1994 fighting video game developed by Arc System Works and published by Angel for the Super Famicom. It is based upon Naoko Takeuchi's Sailor Moon manga and anime series and stars heroic teenage girls who represent the major celestial bodies of the Solar System. The player takes control of one of the girls who have decided to stage a fighting tournament to determine who should lead the group.

Sailor Moon S: Jōgai Rantō!? Shuyaku Sōdatsusen served as both the first full-fledge fighting game in the Sailor Moon franchise and the first fighting project created by Arc System Works. In 1996, an updated version titled Bishōjo Senshi Sailor Moon SuperS: Zenin Sanka!! Shuyaku Sōdatsusen (Note: Japanese: 美少女戦士セーラームーン SuperS・全員参加!!主役争奪戦, Hepburn: Bishōjo Senshi Sērā Mūn Sūpāzu: Zen'in Sanka!! Shuyaku Sōdatsusen; lit. "Pretty Soldier Sailor Moon SuperS: Everyone Together!! Contest for the Lead Part") was published by Angel for the Super Famicom and featured several additions not found in the original release. The game garnered mixed reception from critics upon its initial launch, though retrospective reviews have been more positive. It has been featured at the Evolution Championship Series tournament, among other fighting game events.

== Gameplay ==
Gameplay screenshot showcasing a match between Sailor Pluto and Sailor Uranus.

Bishōjo Senshi Sailor Moon S: Jōgai Rantō!? Shuyaku Sōdatsusen is a fighting game similar to Street Fighter II and Mortal Kombat set in Naoko Takeuchi's Sailor Moon shōjo manga and anime series, taking place during the third season of the anime series after Sailor Moon R. In the game, players control either one of the eight high school girls who represent the celestial bodies of the solar system who are led by the titular Sailor Moon. One day, the girls become frustrated with Sailor Moon's leadership and they stage a fighting tournament to determine who is the best and should be the leader of the group. Players determine who is the best in a staged tournament by fighting against other characters in 1-on-1 matches and the fighter who manages to deplete the health bar of the opponent wins the first bout and the first to win two bouts becomes the winner of the match.

The game features five modes of play and nine playable characters. Playable characters in the game are Sailor Moon, Sailor Mars, Sailor Venus, Sailor Mercury, Sailor Jupiter, Sailor Neptune, Sailor Uranus, Sailor Pluto and Sailor Chibi Moon, Sailor Moon's daughter from the future. Sailor Moon S: Jōgai Rantō!? Shuyaku Sōdatsusen uses a customizable four-button control scheme, with throws being present and are similar to Super Street Fighter II Turbo. Some throws can also be teched by rapidly hitting buttons twice while being thrown. Special moves are present in conventional format, with most commands consisting of standard "quarter-circle" movements. Desperation moves are available at low health or with 9 seconds or less left on the clock and they become available once again until the next round and are considered a strong comeback mechanic.

Jōgai Rantō!? Shuyaku Sōdatsusen also differs from other fighting games of the era in various ways, featuring one of the earliest instances of dashes in the genre, with each character being capable of back-dashing while certain characters can also perform a forward dash. Players are able to cancel block stun into special moves, forward or back dashes, and desperation moves. Players can also customize characters prior to a match in the options menu screen.

== Development and release ==
SuperS: Zenin Sanka!! Shuyaku Sōdatsusen screenshot showcasing a match between Sailor Saturn and Sailor Neptune.

Bishōjo Senshi Sailor Moon S: Jōgai Rantō!? Shuyaku Sōdatsusen was developed during the boom of fighting games after Street Fighter II's launch. The game was both the first full-fledged fighting game in the Sailor Moon franchise and the first fighting title developed by Arc System Works, who had previously ported arcade games such as Double Dragon and Vigilante for the Master System as well as Bishōjo Senshi Sailor Moon for the Mega Drive. BlazBlue producer Kazuto Sekine briefly recounted the project's development process from first-hand accounts of both Arc System Works CEO Minoru Kidooka and Guilty Gear creator Daisuke Ishiwatari in a panel at Evo 2018, stating that grappling characters were becoming popular at the time and one of the programmers insisted on writing an algorithm system to make AI-controlled opponents feel "human-like" while Ishiwatari worked on the game as part-timer, testing characters using the newly-developed algorithm. Arc System Works would later go on to develop fighting games such as the Guilty Gear and BlazBlue franchises, as well as Dragon Ball FighterZ.

Bishōjo Senshi Sailor Moon S: Jōgai Rantō!? Shuyaku Sōdatsusen was first released in Japan by Angel for the Super Famicom on 16 December 1994. The Sailor Moon franchise has a much larger audience in Japan than in America, which is the likely reason why the game was not released outside of Japan. On 29 March 1996, an updated version co-developed by Make Software and Monolith Corp. based on Sailor Moon SuperS titled Bishōjo Senshi Sailor Moon SuperS: Zenin Sanka!! Shuyaku Sōdatsusen was published by Angel, featuring the addition of Sailor Saturn as a playable character. Prior to launch, Sailor Moon SuperS was showcased to attendees of Shoshinkai 1995 and was initially slated for a February 1996 release date.

== Reception and legacy ==
Reception

Review scores
Publication	Score
Famitsu	5/10, 6/10, 6/10, 6/10
Consoles +	81%

Bishōjo Senshi Sailor Moon S: Jōgai Rantō!? Shuyaku Sōdatsusen and Sailor Moon SuperS: Zenin Sanka!! Shuyaku Sōdatsusen received mixed reviews upon release. Multiple reviewers remarked that the game was fairly difficult to complete in single player mode, with one reviewer noting that they had to set the difficulty to lowest to beat the game. Famitsu reported that the title sold over 37,095 copies in its first week on the market. The game sold approximately 59,918 copies during its lifetime in Japan.

However, retrospective reviews for Sailor Moon S: Jōgai Rantō!? Shuyaku Sōdatsusen were more positive. The 2016 mook Perfect Guide of Nostalgic Super Famicom listed it as the ninth best fighting game for the Super Famicom. In 2020, long time Sailor Moon fan Mina Ogawa reviewed the game for Japanese website Inside Games. Though admitting that she isn't very good at fighting games, Ogawa questioned the premise of the girls fighting each other as well as attacking the much younger Chibi. Despite this, she praised the title as being a competent fighting game.

=== Competitive play ===
Jōgai Rantō!? Shuyaku Sōdatsusen has maintained a small cult following within the fighting game community since launch due to its unbalanced mechanics. It has been featured at fighting game tournaments such as AnimEVO, Evo 2018, Evo 2019 and Evo Japan 2020. Other notable tournaments have hosted the title as a major or a side event such as Yabai Invasion, Canada Cup, Combo Breaker, Frosty Faustings and CEOtaku.
