= Bishōjo Senshi Sailor Moon SuperS: Shin Shuyaku Sōdatsusen =

1996 video game

- Cover art for PlayStation version
- Developer: Angel
- Publisher: Angel
- Director: Kazuhiro Ichikawa
- Producer: Yoshihiro Okamoto
- Designer: Jōji Yuno
- Programmers: Jun Maejima; Shizuo Iizawa
- Artists: Akio Watari; Dai Murakami; Enoko Umezakura
- Composer: Takanori Arisawa
- Series: Sailor Moon
- Platforms: PlayStation; Sega Saturn
- Release: PlayStation: JP: 8 March 1996; Saturn: JP: 29 November 1996
- Genre: Fighting
- Modes: Single-player, multiplayer

Bishōjo Senshi Sailor Moon SuperS: Shin Shuyaku Sōdatsusen (Note: Japanese: 美少女戦士セーラームーンSuperS:真・主役争奪戦, Hepburn: Bishōjo Senshi Sērā Mūn Sūpāzu: Shin Shuyaku Sōdatsusen; lit. "Pretty Soldier Sailor Moon SuperS: True Protagonist Competition" or "Pretty Soldier Sailor Moon SuperS: Battle for the True King") is a 1996 fighting video game developed and published by Angel for the PlayStation and Sega Saturn. It is based upon Naoko Takeuchi's Sailor Moon shōjo manga and anime series. Loosely following the fourth season of the anime series, which adapted the fourth arc of the manga, the players control either one of the five original Inner Senshi or one of the four Outer Senshi as they enter a tournament to fight against each other and become the winning victor. The game was created by most of the same team who worked on previously released fighting titles in the Sailor Moon franchise for the Super Famicom at Angel.

== Gameplay ==
PlayStation version screenshot, showcasing a match between Sailor Chibimoon and Sailor Pluto.

As with the previously released Bishōjo Senshi Sailor Moon SuperS: Zenin Sanka!! Shuyaku Sōdatsusen on Super Famicom, Bishōjo Senshi Sailor Moon SuperS: Shin Shuyaku Sōdatsusen is a fighting game similar to Street Fighter II: The World Warrior in which the player fights against other opponents in one-on-one matches and the fighter who manages to deplete the health bar of the opponent wins the first bout and the first to win two bouts becomes the winner of the match. Each round is timed, which can be adjusted or deactivated at the options menu screen and if both fighters still have health remaining when time is over, the one with more health wins that round.

The game features various game modes and settings that can be selected on the menu screen. In the single-player mode, players can choose from the six main Senshi and fight against computer-controlled fighters across several locations from the series. Each Senshi have a set of four specials techniques, three power attacks, and their new power from the anime series. These special attack and moves can be performed by inputting a combination of directional and button-based commands. The Outer Senshi, however, only have three powers available to them instead. Players can also customize characters, by assigning up to 20 points to increase the attributes of each of the characters.

The Saturn version also features a separate single-player mode in which characters unavailable in story mode can be selected, a practice mode with accessible special-move commands, and a versus mode supporting five-character team battles.

== Development and release ==
Bishōjo Senshi Sailor Moon SuperS: Shin Shuyaku Sōdatsusen was created by most of the same team who worked on previously released fighting titles in the Sailor Moon franchise for the Super Famicom at Angel, with both Kazuhiro Ichikawa and Yoshihiro Okamoto acting as director and producer. Jōji Yuno served as planning adviser, while Jun Maejima and Shizuo Iizawa worked as programmers. The music was composed by Takanori Arisawa, while seiyūs from the anime series returned to reprise their respective roles. Other people also collaborated in its development. The game uses a pre-rendered 3D visual style, similar to the game Killer Instinct.

Bishōjo Senshi Sailor Moon SuperS: Shin Shuyaku Sōdatsusen was first released for PlayStation on March 8, 1996. The original PlayStation release was published by Angel as two editions: A "First Press" edition and a standard edition. Spanish magazine Japanmania reported that a European release of the PlayStation version was considered by Konami but the plan was ultimately scrapped due to the game's poor quality.

A Sega Saturn version was announced by June 1996 under the provisional title Bishōjo Senshi Sailor Moon SuperS: Shin Shuyaku Sōdatsusen Plus. Contemporary coverage in Saturn Fan and Sega Saturn Magazine presented the adaptation as an expanded version of the PlayStation game, with additional material produced specifically for the Saturn release.

Previews highlighted a computer-generated opening movie and original animated sequences featuring the Sailor Guardians, as well as additional story scenes accompanying the fighting gameplay. Sega Saturn Magazine reported that development was 65 percent complete in August 1996. By September, the game had been renamed Bishōjo Senshi Sailor Moon SuperS: Various Emotion, with the magazine reporting 90 percent completion. Its preview also detailed the scenario, single-player, versus and practice modes. The Saturn version was published by Angel in Japan on November 29, 1996, at a retail price of ¥5,800.

== Reception ==
Reception

Review scores
Publication	Score
Famitsu	(PS) 20/40 (SS) 5/10, 4/10, 5/10, 6/10
Dengeki PlayStation	(PS) 45/100, 35/100
Saturn Fan	(SS) 4.2/10
Sega Saturn Magazine (JP)	(SS) 5.66/10

Both the Saturn and PlayStation versions of the game were met with largely mixed reviews. GameFan's Dave Halverson gave the original PlayStation version a largely positive review. Writing for Viz Media's online magazine J-Pop, Ryan MacDonald was critical of the game, stating that "if you like Sailor Moon watch the show, don't import what for the most part is a bad PlayStation fighting game." French magazine Joypad also criticized the Saturn version for its lackluster visuals. Likewise, Reyda Seddiki of the French publication Player One gave the Saturn release a largely negative review, criticizing its poorly executed 3D graphics, unplayable gameplay and lack of originality. He characterized the game as an attempt to capitalize on the popularity of Sailor Moon and advised readers to avoid it.

Saturn Fan was more critical, awarding the Saturn version an average score of 4.2 out of 10 from five reviewers. The magazine criticised its unresponsive controls, unnatural character movements, poorly balanced special attacks and repetitive combat. Although the reviewers acknowledged the inclusion of voice actors from the anime and additional animated sequences, they considered the game a disappointing adaptation of the Sailor Moon franchise. One reviewer nevertheless welcomed the appearance of Hotaru Tomoe, while the magazine primarily recommended the game to dedicated fans and collectors.

The three reviewers of the Japanese Sega Saturn Magazine gave the Saturn version scores of 6, 5 and 6 out of 10, respectively, for an average of 5.66/10. They criticized the difficulty of executing special moves and the sluggish character movements, although one reviewer noted that simplified button commands helped compensate for the demanding controls. Another questioned why the game was based on Sailor Moon SuperS rather than the then-current Sailor Moon Sailor Stars series. In the final Sega Saturn reader rankings, the Saturn version received an average score of 2.8979 out of 10, placing 921st out of 945 games.

== Legacy ==
The Sega Saturn version, Various Emotion, later became notable for featuring an animated transformation sequence for Hotaru Tomoe/Sailor Saturn, whose transformation had not been depicted in the 1990s Sailor Moon anime. In 2021, Brian Ashcraft of Kotaku highlighted the game as the first non-anime medium to depict Sailor Saturn's transformation, more than two decades before an on-screen transformation for the character appeared in Sailor Moon Eternal.
