= List of Sailor Moon video games =

The Sailor Moon video game series is based on Naoko Takeuchi's manga and anime series of the same name. The series was released in Japan during the height of the media franchise's popularity. By 1995, there were ten game releases, each with sales figures of about 200,000 to 300,000. By 1998, twenty games were released.

Despite the worldwide popularity of the anime, the vast majority of video games based on the series have never officially been released outside of Asia, outside of a few Europe-exclusive video games.

== Nintendo systems ==
Game	Details
Bishōjo Senshi Sailor Moon Original release date(s): JP: December 18, 1992	Release years by system: 1992—Game Boy
Bishōjo Senshi Sailor Moon Original release date(s): JP: December 18, 1992	Notes: Beat 'em up video game, developed by Arc System Works and published by Angel.
Bishōjo Senshi Sailor Moon R Original release date(s): JP: April 22, 1994	Release years by system: 1994—Game Boy
Bishōjo Senshi Sailor Moon R Original release date(s): JP: April 22, 1994	Notes: Action video game, developed and published by Angel.
Bishōjo Senshi Sailor Moon Original release date(s): JP: August 27, 1993; EU: December 31, 1994	Release years by system: 1993—Super Nintendo Entertainment System
Bishōjo Senshi Sailor Moon Original release date(s): JP: August 27, 1993; EU: December 31, 1994	Notes: Beat 'em up video game, developed by Angel in 1993, and ported to the Super Nintendo Entertainment System. It was localized in Europe exclusively in French in 1994.; A version for the Sega Mega Drive (known as the Genesis in North America) was developed and published by Ma-Ba, although certain elements were recycled from the Super NES version.
Bishōjo Senshi Sailor Moon R Original release date(s): JP: December 29, 1993	Release years by system: 1993—Super Nintendo Entertainment System
Bishōjo Senshi Sailor Moon R Original release date(s): JP: December 29, 1993	Notes: Sequel to the first Sailor Moon Super NES video game.; Introduced a new playable character, Chibiusa. The sprites from the previous game were redesigned with more detail and more animation frames for this game and the later games.
Bishōjo Senshi Sailor Moon S: Kondo wa Puzzle de Oshiokiyo! Original release date(s): JP: July 15, 1994	Release years by system: 1994—Super Nintendo Entertainment System
Bishōjo Senshi Sailor Moon S: Kondo wa Puzzle de Oshiokiyo! Original release date(s): JP: July 15, 1994	Notes: Puzzle video game, developed by Tom Create and published by Bandai.
Bishōjo Senshi Sailor Moon S: Jōgai Rantō!? Shuyaku Sōdatsusen Original release date(s): JP: December 16, 1994	Release years by system: 1994—Super Nintendo Entertainment System
Bishōjo Senshi Sailor Moon S: Jōgai Rantō!? Shuyaku Sōdatsusen Original release date(s): JP: December 16, 1994	Notes: Fighting game developed by Arc System Works and published by Angel.; The game features three game modes: a single-player plot-based Story mode, as well as a Tournament mode and 2-Player Versus mode where all the Sailor Guardians are able to be selected including the Outer Guardians (except Sailor Saturn).; The game has developed an active competitive scene – most notably in North America, making appearances in tournaments such as the Evolution Championship Series.
Bishōjo Senshi Sailor Moon S Kurukkurin Original release date(s): JP: February 24, 1995	Release years by system: 1995—Super Nintendo Entertainment System
Bishōjo Senshi Sailor Moon S Kurukkurin Original release date(s): JP: February 24, 1995	Notes: Puzzle video game, developed by Tom Create and published by Bandai.
Bishōjo Senshi Sailor Moon: Another Story Original release date(s): JP: September 22, 1995	Release years by system: 1995—Super Nintendo Entertainment System
Bishōjo Senshi Sailor Moon: Another Story Original release date(s): JP: September 22, 1995	Notes: Role-playing video game developed and published by Angel.; The game is set between the third and fourth story arcs and combines original elements with elements from both the anime and manga.
Bishōjo Senshi Sailor Moon SuperS: Fuwa Fuwa Panic Original release date(s): JP: December 8, 1995	Release years by system: 1995—Super Nintendo Entertainment System
Bishōjo Senshi Sailor Moon SuperS: Fuwa Fuwa Panic Original release date(s): JP: December 8, 1995	Notes: Puzzle video game, developed by Tom Create and published by Bandai.
Bishōjo Senshi Sailor Moon SuperS: Zenin Sanka! Shuyaku Soudatsusen Original release date(s): JP: March 29, 1996	Release years by system: 1996—Super Nintendo Entertainment System
Bishōjo Senshi Sailor Moon SuperS: Zenin Sanka! Shuyaku Soudatsusen Original release date(s): JP: March 29, 1996	Notes: Fighting game, developed by Monolith and published by Angel.; In story mode, Sailors Moon, Chibi Moon and the Inner Guardians are available. In two players mode (versus other player or versus computer) all ten Guardians could be selected. Tournament and training modes are also present.
Bishōjo Senshi Sailor Moon Sailor Stars: Fuwa Fuwa Panic 2 Original release date(s): JP: September 27, 1996	Release years by system: 1996—Super Nintendo Entertainment System
Bishōjo Senshi Sailor Moon Sailor Stars: Fuwa Fuwa Panic 2 Original release date(s): JP: September 27, 1996	Notes: Puzzle video game, developed and published by Bandai.
Sailor Moon: La Luna Splende Original release date(s): ITA: March 16, 2011	Release years by system: 2011—Nintendo DS
Sailor Moon: La Luna Splende Original release date(s): ITA: March 16, 2011	Notes: Platform game, developed by Open Sesame and published by Namco Bandai Games for the Italian market only.

== Sega systems ==
Game	Details
Bishōjo Senshi Sailor Moon Original release date(s): JP: July 8, 1994	Release years by system: 1994—Sega Genesis
Bishōjo Senshi Sailor Moon Original release date(s): JP: July 8, 1994	Notes: Beat 'em up game developed by Arc System Works and TNS and published by Ma-Ba.
Bishōjo Senshi Sailor Moon S Original release date(s): JP: January 27, 1995	Release years by system: 1995—Game Gear
Bishōjo Senshi Sailor Moon S Original release date(s): JP: January 27, 1995	Notes: Fighting 2D game, developed by Shimada Kikaku and published by Bandai.
Bishōjo Senshi Sailor Moon SuperS: Various Emotion Original release date(s): JP: November 29, 1996	Release years by system: 1996—Sega Saturn
Bishōjo Senshi Sailor Moon SuperS: Various Emotion Original release date(s): JP: November 29, 1996	Notes: Fighting game, developed and published by Angel.
Bishōjo Senshi Sailor Moon S Original release date(s): JP: 1994	Release years by system: 1994—Sega Pico
Bishōjo Senshi Sailor Moon S Original release date(s): JP: 1994	Notes:
Bishōjo Senshi Sailor Moon SuperS Original release date(s): JP: 1995	Release years by system: 1995—Sega Pico
Bishōjo Senshi Sailor Moon SuperS Original release date(s): JP: 1995	Notes:
Bishōjo Senshi Sailor Moon Sailor Stars Original release date(s): JP: 1996	Release years by system: 1996—Sega Pico
Bishōjo Senshi Sailor Moon Sailor Stars Original release date(s): JP: 1996	Notes:

== PlayStation systems ==
Game	Details
Bishōjo Senshi Sailor Moon SuperS: Shin Shuyaku Soudatsusen Original release date(s): JP: March 8, 1996	Release years by system: 1996—PlayStation
Bishōjo Senshi Sailor Moon SuperS: Shin Shuyaku Soudatsusen Original release date(s): JP: March 8, 1996	Notes: Fighting 2D game, published by Angel.; All ten Soldiers are playable in two player mode. However, in story mode, players can only choose from the six main Soldiers. All six major Soldiers now have four specials techniques, three power attacks, and their new power from the show. The four other Soldiers only have three powers available to them.; Players can also customize characters, by assigning up to 20 points to increase the attributes of each of the characters. The game offers four levels of difficulty, ranging from Easy to Hardest.
Kids Station: Bishōjo Senshi Sailor Moon World – Chibiusa to Tanoshii Mainichi Original release date(s): JP: November 29, 2001	Release years by system: 2001—PlayStation
Kids Station: Bishōjo Senshi Sailor Moon World – Chibiusa to Tanoshii Mainichi Original release date(s): JP: November 29, 2001	Notes: Miscellaneous game, developed and published by Bandai.

== Playdia systems ==
Game	Details
Bishōjo Senshi Sailor Moon S: Quiz Taiketsu! Sailor Power Ketsushuu Original release date(s): JP: September 23, 1994	Release years by system: 1994—Playdia
Bishōjo Senshi Sailor Moon S: Quiz Taiketsu! Sailor Power Ketsushuu Original release date(s): JP: September 23, 1994	Notes: Trivia/Game Show video game, developed and published by Bandai.
Bishōjo Senshi Sailor Moon SuperS: Sailor Moon to Hiragana Lesson! Original release date(s): JP: July 28, 1995	Release years by system: 1995—Playdia
Bishōjo Senshi Sailor Moon SuperS: Sailor Moon to Hiragana Lesson! Original release date(s): JP: July 28, 1995	Notes: Miscellaneous game, developed and published by Bandai.
Bishōjo Senshi Sailor Moon SuperS: Youkoso! Sailor Youchien Original release date(s): JP: August 24, 1995	Release years by system: 1995—Playdia
Bishōjo Senshi Sailor Moon SuperS: Youkoso! Sailor Youchien Original release date(s): JP: August 24, 1995	Notes: Miscellaneous game, developed and published by Bandai.
Bishōjo Senshi Sailor Moon SuperS: Sailor Moon to Hajimete no Eigo Original release date(s): JP: August 24, 1995	Release years by system: 1995—Playdia
Bishōjo Senshi Sailor Moon SuperS: Sailor Moon to Hajimete no Eigo Original release date(s): JP: August 24, 1995	Notes: Miscellaneous game, developed and published by Bandai.

== Other systems ==
Game	Details
Bishōjo Senshi Sailor Moon: Kessen Dark Kingdom Original release date(s): JP: March 17, 1993	Release years by system: 1993—Sharp X68000
Bishōjo Senshi Sailor Moon: Kessen Dark Kingdom Original release date(s): JP: March 17, 1993	Notes: Beat 'em up video game, developed and published by Black HCS.
Bishōjo Senshi Sailor V Original release date(s): JP: 1994	Release years by system: 1994—Sharp X68000
Bishōjo Senshi Sailor V Original release date(s): JP: 1994	Notes: Video game based on Codename: Sailor V.; Fighting 2D game, developed and published by DK Software.
Bishōjo Senshi Sailor Moon Original release date(s): JP: August 5, 1994	Release years by system: 1994—Turbo CD
Bishōjo Senshi Sailor Moon Original release date(s): JP: August 5, 1994	Notes: Visual novel video game, developed and published by Banpresto.
Bishōjo Senshi Sailor Moon S: Kotaete Moon Call! Original release date(s): JP: September 26, 1994	Release years by system: 1994—Terebikko
Bishōjo Senshi Sailor Moon S: Kotaete Moon Call! Original release date(s): JP: September 26, 1994	Notes: Trivia video game, developed and published by Bandai.
Bishōjo Senshi Sailor Moon Collection Original release date(s): JP: November 25, 1994	Release years by system: 1994—Turbo CD
Bishōjo Senshi Sailor Moon Collection Original release date(s): JP: November 25, 1994	Notes: Miscellaneous game, developed by TamTam and published by Banpresto.
Pretty Soldier Sailor Moon S Original release date(s): JP: March 17, 1995	Release years by system: 1995—3DO Interactive Multiplayer
Pretty Soldier Sailor Moon S Original release date(s): JP: March 17, 1995	Notes: Fighting 2D game, developed by Tose and published by Bandai.; It features nine Sailor Guardians (Sailor Saturn is not present).; Each Soldier has a set of special attacks. Virtual camera is zooming during battle, approaching the fighters and retreating from them. Opening intro combines sprite and 3D animation.
Pretty Soldier Sailor Moon Original release date(s): WW: March 22, 1995	Release years by system: 1995—Arcade game
Pretty Soldier Sailor Moon Original release date(s): WW: March 22, 1995	Notes: Beat 'em up video game developed by Gazelle (one of the offshoots of shooter developer Toaplan) and published by Banpresto in Japan, and by Sega Worldwide. It was released in March 1995. The game has been described as a beat 'em up inspired by Capcom's Final Fight.
Charaful Comp: Pretty Soldier Sailor Moon Super S Original release date(s): JP: 1995	Release years by system: 1995—Arcade game
Charaful Comp: Pretty Soldier Sailor Moon Super S Original release date(s): JP: 1995	Notes: Redemption game published by Banpresto.
Quiz Bishōjo Senshi Sailor Moon: Chiryoku Tairyoku Toki no Un Original release date(s): JP: 1997	Release years by system: 1997—Arcade game
Quiz Bishōjo Senshi Sailor Moon: Chiryoku Tairyoku Toki no Un Original release date(s): JP: 1997	Notes: Trivia/Game Show video game, developed by Gazelle and published by Banpresto.
The 3D Adventures of Sailor Moon Original release date(s): US: 1997	Release years by system: 1997—PC
The 3D Adventures of Sailor Moon Original release date(s): US: 1997	Notes: Miscellaneous game, developed and published by 3VR New Media in association with DIC Entertainment (Held the rights to the English dub of the anime).
Sailor Moon Horoskop & Games Original release date(s): EU: March 31, 2000	Release years by system: 2000—PC
Sailor Moon Horoskop & Games Original release date(s): EU: March 31, 2000	Notes: Party/minigame game, developed and published by Egmont Group.

== Mobile ==
Game	Details
Silver Crystal for Sailor V Original release date(s): JP: November 24, 2014	Release years by system: 2014— iPhone, Android
Silver Crystal for Sailor V Original release date(s): JP: November 24, 2014	Notes: Sailor V is the playable character.
Sailor Moon Drops Original release date(s): JP: April 12, 2016	Release years by system: 2016—iPhone, Android
Sailor Moon Drops Original release date(s): JP: April 12, 2016	Notes: Match-3 puzzler developed by Beeline Interactive Japan, Inc. and published by Bandai Namco Entertainment.; Bandai Namco discontinued the game on March 28, 2019. The company issued an announcement several months before. This prompted fans to issue a petition on Change.org, asking Bandai Namco not to cancel the game.

== Other games featuring Sailor Moon characters ==
Game	Details
Nakayoshi to Issho Original release date(s): JP: December 10, 1993	Release years by system: 1993—Famicom
Nakayoshi to Issho Original release date(s): JP: December 10, 1993	Notes: Adventure game, published by Yutaka.; It features Sailor Moon and Luna.
Werukamu Nakayoshi Pāku Original release date(s): JP: March 3, 1994	Release years by system: 1994—Game Boy
Werukamu Nakayoshi Pāku Original release date(s): JP: March 3, 1994	Notes: Mini-games where players collect autographs from various Sailor Moon characters.
Panic in Nakayoshi World Original release date(s): JP: November 18, 1994	Release years by system: 1994—Super Famicom
Panic in Nakayoshi World Original release date(s): JP: November 18, 1994	Notes: Action video game, developed by Tom Create and published by Bandai.; Sailor Moon and Sailor Chibi Moon are playable characters.
Tanoshiku Asonde Nouryoku Up! Tanoshii Youchien Original release date(s): JP: November 15, 1994	Release years by system: 1994—Sega Pico
Tanoshiku Asonde Nouryoku Up! Tanoshii Youchien Original release date(s): JP: November 15, 1994	Notes: "Edutainment" video game featuring Sailor Moon, as well as characters from other franchises such as Ninja Sentai Kakuranger, Blue SWAT and Ultraman Powered.
Tanoshiku Asonde Nouryoku Up! Tanoshii Youchien '95-nendoban Original release date(s): JP: April 3, 1995	Release years by system: 1995—Sega Pico
Tanoshiku Asonde Nouryoku Up! Tanoshii Youchien '95-nendoban Original release date(s): JP: April 3, 1995	Notes: "Edutainment" video game featuring Sailor Moon and Sailor Chibi Moon, as well as characters from other franchises such as Chouriki Sentai Ohranger and Ultraman.
Puyopuyo!! Quest Original release date(s): JP: April 24, 2013	Release years by system: 2013—iOS, Android, Kindle Fire
Puyopuyo!! Quest Original release date(s): JP: April 24, 2013	Notes: Puzzle game, developed by Sonic Team.; This game featured two events as part of the Sailor Moon franchise: Moon Medal Festival, from March 18 to 24, 2019, Lost Child's Firefly Festival, from March 13 to 22, 2020 and Circus Flyer Festival, from March 13 to 21, 2021.
Monster Strike Original release date(s): JP: September 27, 2013	Release years by system: 2013—iOS, Android
Monster Strike Original release date(s): JP: September 27, 2013	Notes: The mobile Japanese role-playing physics game developed by XFLAG.; This game featured a single-event as part of the Sailor Moon franchise.
Arena of Valor Original release date(s): TW: October 12, 2016	Release years by system: 2016—iPhone, Android
Arena of Valor Original release date(s): TW: October 12, 2016	Notes: This collaboration features character skins of Eternal Sailor Moon, Tuxedo Mask, and Sailor Chibi Moon.
Monster Hunter XX Original release date(s): JP: March 18, 2017	Release years by system: 2017—Nintendo 3DS
Monster Hunter XX Original release date(s): JP: March 18, 2017	Notes: This is collaboration with Capcom as part of the 25th anniversary celebration of the Sailor Moon franchise. The Felyne cat companion resembles Luna and wields Sailor Moon's Cutie Moon Rod weapon.
