= Sailor Moon: La Luna Splende =

2011 video game

- Developer: Open Sesame
- Publisher: Namco Bandai Games
- Series: Sailor Moon
- Platform: Nintendo DS
- Release: ITA: 16 March 2011
- Genres: Action, Platform, Puzzle
- Mode: Single-player

Sailor Moon: La Luna Splende (English: Sailor Moon: The Moon Shines) is a video game developed by Open Sesame and published by Namco Bandai Games for the Nintendo DS and released in Italy on 16 March 2011. The title is inspired by the anime series Sailor Moon, and although the title of the video game refers to the Italian title of the second season, its plot and player characters are specific to the first season.

== Plot ==
Sailor Moon and the other Sailor Guardians set out on an adventure in which they will have to save Naru Osaka, Usagi's best friend, who has fallen into a deep sleep from which she can no longer emerge, which turns out to be a trap set by the Dark Kingdom.

== Gameplay ==
The player must select from one of the five protagonists to complete the video game, which is divided into three main phases: the Jewel Palace, the Mystery Castle and the Flower Garden, each of which consists of 20-30 levels. The levels combine elements of platform action video games with others of puzzle video games.

Some in-game content can be unlocked by the player through progression, such as character customization with accessories.
