= Goldfish Warning! =

Japanese manga series

- Goldfish Forecast

きんぎょ注意報！ (Kingyo Chūihō!)
- Genre: Comedy
- Manga
- Written by: Neko Nekobe
- Published by: Kodansha
- Magazine: Nakayoshi
- Original run: February 1989 – June 1993
- Volumes: 8
- Anime television series
- Directed by: Junichi Sato
- Produced by: Kenji Ota (TV Asahi); Yoshifumi Hatano; Iriya Azuma
- Written by: Keiko Maruo
- Music by: Takanori Arisawa
- Studio: Toei Animation
- Original network: ANN (TV Asahi)
- Original run: January 12, 1991 – February 29, 1992
- Episodes: 54 (108 segments)
- Anime film
- Directed by: Junichi Sato
- Written by: Keiko Maruo
- Music by: Takanori Arisawa
- Studio: Toei Animation
- Released: April 25, 1992
- Runtime: 21 minutes
- Manga

Goldfish Warning! Gaiden Ushi Ushi World
- Written by: Neko Nekobe
- Published by: Kodansha
- Magazine: Nakayoshi
- Original run: September 1993 – November 1993
- Manga

Goldfish Warning! Returns
- Written by: Neko Nekobe
- Published by: Kodansha
- Magazine: Nakayoshi
- Original run: 2005 – present

Goldfish Forecast (きんぎょ注意報!, Kingyo Chūihō!) is a Japanese manga series written and illustrated by Neko Nekobe which ran in Nakayoshi. A 54-episode anime television series aired on TV Asahi from January 12, 1991, through February 29, 1992. Each episode of the anime contained two 11-minute stories, often unconnected with each other. A short film was released in 1992. The anime was made into an anime comic format with six episodes per volume. The first volume was released on July 25, 1991.

After the end of the series, most of the anime's staff moved on to Sailor Moon (which would succeed this series in its timeslot), including director Junichi Sato and music composer Takanori Arisawa. Many references to Goldfish Warning! are made in Sailor Moon's first season.

A complete DVD set of the series was released on March 24, 2005.

== Plot ==
The manga tells the story about 14-year-old girl named Chitose Fujinomiya, who was formerly rich girl, but is currently an orphan who was kicked out of her super-elite school, Tokai no Gakuen (City's Academy), and is shunned by her former friends. She is sent to a rural public school, Inaka no Chugakkō (Country's Jr. High School), where very needy students and even pigs, oxen and chickens are students.

The only possession Chitose has left is a pink goldfish named Gyopi, given to her by her beloved father, and is very valuable. Her family's attorney attempts to steal Gyopi, but is foiled by Chitose's new schoolmates, namely Wapiko, a simple girl who can outrun almost anything and is well-liked in school. As it turns out, Chitose isn't poor; the attorney was merely hiding her inheritance for himself. Instead of going back to her former elite school, she buys the rural school and attempts to transform it into a refined school to compete with her former school but the students of the rural school don't want the school changed.

== Characters ==
=== Students ===
Chitose Fujinomiya (藤ノ宮 千歳)
Voiced by: Yumi Takada
A very uptight girl with long blonde hair that is kept back with a hairband, Chitose is worried that the students of Shin-Inaka no Chugakko (Wapiko especially) will cause her newly-formed school to be worse than Tokai no Gakuen. She is very arrogant to the point where she is unable to escape from a burning building due to her belief that she was raised as a high-class girl, and that she is not as tough as all the country students of Shin-Inaka no Chugakko (who had all escaped from the building except Wapiko due to her trying to get Chitose to escape) as well as trying to frequently ban all normal customs of the school to enforce a more "proper" custom, such as a Tea Ceremony Club, but ultimately fails, due to her plans usually backfiring. She is the president of Shin-Inaka No Chugakko. Her nickname is "Chi-chan".
Wapiko (わぴこ)
Voiced by: Mika Kanai
An eccentric pink-haired girl who wears a Sailor-fuku, the agile Wapiko may be viewed as the closest thing the series offers to a true heroine. Almost always depicted in a comical chibi art style, she nearly always has a smile on her face and a happy-go-lucky personality, despite often being a chief instigator of events that bring anguish to Chitose. For being a middle school student, Wapiko tends to act and think like a small child. Nevertheless, her super speed, bloodhound-like nose, winning spirit and bottomless appetite for fun have earned her the respect of the entire student body, minus Chitose. Despite Chitose owning Gyopi, she and the goldfish are quite close to each other.
Shūichi Kitada (北田 秀一)
Voiced by: Yoku Shioya
Shūichi is Wapiko's classmate and the sub-president of Shin-Inaka no Chugakko, and is puzzled over Chitose's recklessness. He is a doctor's son, is calm and friendly, but shows aggression toward the student council fees. He gets good grades when studying in a clamorous classroom, as he previously got all zero grades when Chitose's mother moved him to a quieter class. His nickname is "Shu-chan", but he is called "Shu-bo" by Aoi, and "Mr. Bluewhale" by Tamiko.
Aoi (葵)
Voiced by: Nobuo Tobita
Aoi is Wapiko's classmate who is a blonde boy wearing sunglasses and a souvenir jacket, and also the student body treasurer of Shin-Inaka no Chugakko. He is Wapiko and Shuichi's best friend from infancy, likes bargain-hunting at Inaka no Supermarket so much, often get out of school for it. He is a rare person that could make control Chitose and Wapiko perfectly, but it could lure him with food. His nickname is "Aoi-chan".
Tamiko Umino (海野 民子)
Voiced by: Masako Miura
Shin-Inaka no Chugakko's student, Tamiko is a girl with ponytail who likes Shuichi.
Michael (マイケル)
Voiced by: Masami Kikuchi
Wapiko's classmate and one of chibi-characters.
Bunta (文太)
Voiced by: Megumi Urawa
Wapiko's classmate.
Santa (三太)
Voiced by: Tomoko Naka
Wapiko's classmate.
Rumiko (るみ子)
Voiced by: Mayumi Seto
Wapiko's classmate.
Akeko (朱子)
Voiced by: Mariko Kouda
Wapiko's classmate.
Yurika Sugadaira (菅平 由梨香)
Voiced by: Keiko Han
Chitose's rival and the student council's president of Tokai no Gakuen, Yurika is a very uptight, arrogant girl as Chitose. She wants obstacles to Chitose but almost fails, and is addicted to Aoi.
Asaba (浅羽)
Voiced by: Tsutomu Kashiwakura, Masaya Onosaka (only in Episode 3)
Asaba is Chitose's ex-boyfriend and the sub-president of Tokai no Gakuen who hated poor people. Since he learned Chitose turns to rich again, he wants to return her former love.
Takahiro Katō (加藤 高広)
Voiced by: Taiki Matsuno
The chairperson of Tokai no Gakuen, the one of Chibi-characters, Takahiro is a relatively conscientious student than Yurika and Asaba, and is addicted to Wapiko. His nickname is "Takapi".

=== Staff ===
Principal (校長)
Voiced by: Kōhei Miyauchi
One of the chibi-characters, he is the principal of Shin-Inaka no Chugakko who has an unknown tentacle, and can talk with snail.
Mizoguchi (溝口)
Voiced by: Toshio Kobayashi
One of the chibi-characters, Mizoguchi is Wapiko's class teacher, who thinks that his class is lawless.
Kozato (小里)
Shin-Inaka no Chugakko's music educator.
Tanakayama (田中山)
Voiced by: Hirohiko Kakegawa
One of the chibi-characters, a former Fujinomiya family's attorney, currently Yurika's handyman, he wants to swindle Chitose's property but always fails, and spends the whole time for Yurika's order.
Chitose's Mom (千歳のママ)
Voiced by: Rihoko Yoshida
Chitose's mom apparently leaves to Switzerland for healing, but constantly visits Shin-Inaka Chugakko with souvenirs from Shizuoka Prefecture or Nagoya area, and causes a trouble.

=== Animals ===
Gyopi (ぎょぴ)
Voiced by: Minori Matsushima
Gyopi is a talking pink goldfish, which is in possession of Chitose's family, and has worth several hundred million yen. Gyopi could even fly to the sky.
Mīko (みーこ)
Voiced by: Asami Seto
One of cats raised in Shin-Inaka no Chugakko.
Ina-chan (イナちゃん)
Voiced by: Tomoko Naka
One of the talking pigs raised in Shin-Inaka no Chugakko.
Ushiko (ウシ子)
Voiced by: Mayumi Seto
One of talking female cows raised in Shin-Inaka no Chugakko.
Ushio (ウシ男)
Voiced by: Toshio Kobayashi
One of the talking male cows raised in Shin-Inaka no Chugakko, Ushio is a boyfriend of Ushiko.
Furyō-ushi (不良牛)
Voiced by: Hirohiko Kakegawa
One of the talking male cows, he is a bad boy with a scar and likes Yakisoba-pan.
Ushimi (ウシ美)
Voiced by: Eriko Hara
One of the talking female cows, Ushimi is a madonna of male cows and loves Shuichi.
Same-san (サメさん)
Voiced by: Naoki Tatsuta
Gyopi's best friend and a talking shark raised in Shin-Inaka no Chugakko's school pool, Same-san only eats potato chips.
Gyopo (ぎょポ)
Voiced by: Rei Sakuma
Gyopi's girlfriend which appears in the film, Gyopo is a talking yellow goldfish who is sold for a hundred yen by Tanakayama.

== Theme songs ==
Opening theme
- Wapiko Genki Yohou performed by Junko Uchida
Ending themes
- Super Kingyou performed by Junko Uchida
- Gyopi Dance performed by Junko Uchida

== Video games ==
There were three Goldfish Warning! video games released in Japan: two titles for the Game Boy, and another for the Super Famicom. Goldfish Warning! characters also appear in a few other games such as Panic in Nakayoshi World.

- Kingyo Chūihō! Wapiko no Waku Waku Stamp Rally!, Game Boy (1991), published by Yutaka
- Kingyo Chūihō! 2 Gyopichan o Sagase!, Game Boy (1992), developed by KID
- Kingyo Chūihō! Tobidase! Game Gakuen, Super Famicom (1994), published by Jaleco
