= Takanori Arisawa =

Japanese composer and arranger

- Born: April 2, 1951; Tokyo, Japan
- Died: November 26, 2005 (aged 54); Ōta, Tokyo, Japan
- Education: Senzoku Gakuen
- Occupations: Composer and arranger
- Years active: 1980–2005
- Known for: Composing Sailor Moon series and Digimon series (Seasons 1-4)
- Spouse: Keiko Arisawa (m. ?–2005)

Takanori Arisawa (有澤 孝紀, Arisawa Takanori; April 2, 1951 – November 26, 2005) was a Japanese composer and arranger best known for composing the Sailor Moon and Digimon (Seasons 1-4) anime series. He wrote music for the series, including its video games. Born in Tokyo, Arisawa began to learn piano at the age of 20. After graduating from Senzoku Gakuen College, Arisawa started his career in 1980 by composing "Shinjuku Transfer". He worked for the Tokyo Broadcasting System and wrote several TV dramas. From the 1990s until his death, Arisawa began composing for anime series exclusively. His work on Sailor Moon was initially based on pop music, but gradually began to change to those found in classical music. Sailor Moon was successful and Arisawa won several awards for his work. After Sailor Moon, Arisawa composed music for several shows, including the Digimon series, until his death from bladder cancer in 2005.

== Biography ==
Arisawa was mostly self-taught, having been interested in music from childhood. He started to learn piano when he was 20 years old, and entered Senzoku Gakuen College when he was 22, eventually graduating with degrees in Composing and Orchestral Music. He studied jazz and pop arrangement with arranger Norio Maeda.

In 1980, Arisawa's song "Shinjuku Transfer" was recorded by the chorus group SOAP for Epic/Sony Records. The group released a full album the following year, "Harmotopia," and received the New Composer Incentive Award at the 1981 Tokyo Music Festival. The group broke up in 1982, but "Harmotopia" was re-released in 1993.

During the 1980s Arisawa worked as a composer and arranger for Tokyo Broadcasting System and wrote music for television commercials, including Coca-Cola advertisements. He also composed for various TV dramas, and released a single, "Takeoff of Love", for Japan Airlines' 30th anniversary celebration. He later served as music director for the NHK series Let's Learn English!.

As the music director for Sailor Moon, Arisawa's first award was the 1993 Golden Disk Grand Prize from Nippon Columbia. He continued to compose for the entire anime series, plus several video games and some of the stage musicals. In 1998, 2000, and 2001 he won the JASRAC International Award for most international royalties, owing largely to the popularity of Sailor Moon music in other nations.

Arisawa expressed an admiration of Hollywood-style music, drawing his initial inspiration for the tone of the Sailor Moon soundtrack from the Charlie's Angels TV series. He frequently made use of symbolism when writing themes for specific characters or groups, borrowing thematic elements from diverse genres and from other countries. As the series progressed, his music gravitated from a pop feeling toward more classical arrangements to represent the protagonist having passed through painful experiences and grown as a person.

In 2005, his score piece for Sailor Moon was used in Steven Spielberg's War of the Worlds, before his death on November 26 after the movie was released on June 29.

== Works ==
=== Anime ===
Year	Title
1987	Bikkuriman
1988	Wowser
1991	Goldfish Warning!
1992	Sailor Moon
1992	Super Bikkuriman
1993	Sailor Moon R
1994	Sailor Moon S
1995	Sailor Moon SuperS
1995	Galaxy Fräulein Yuna
1996	Sailor Moon Sailor Stars
1997	Yume no Crayon Oukoku
1999	Moero!! Robocon
1999	Digimon Adventure
2000	Digimon Adventure 02
2001	Tales of Eternia
2001	Ask Dr. Rin!
2001	Digimon Tamers
2002	Digimon Frontier
