= Sailor Moon SuperS =

Fourth season of the Sailor Moon anime series

- Season 4
- The Japanese logo for the third season, originally translating to Pretty Soldier Sailor Moon SuperS
- No. of episodes: 39

Release
- Original network: TV Asahi
- Original release: March 4, 1995 – March 2, 1996

Season chronology
- ← Previous; Sailor Moon S Next → Sailor Moon Sailor Stars

The fourth season of the Sailor Moon anime series, Sailor Moon SuperS, (Note: Originally released in Japan as Pretty Soldier Sailor Moon SuperS (美少女戦士セーラームーン SuperS(スーパーズ), Bishōjo Senshi Sērā Mūn Sūpāzu), and later as Pretty Guardian Sailor Moon SuperS.) was produced by Toei Animation and directed by Kunihiko Ikuhara. It premiered on TV Asahi on March 4, 1995, and ended on March 2, 1996, lasting 39 episodes.

Sailor Moon SuperS adapts the "Dream" arc of the Sailor Moon manga series by Naoko Takeuchi, and features a lighthearted, comedic slice-of-life tone compared to the previous season. The story follows Usagi Tsukino and her fellow Super Sailor Guardians in their fight against Queen Nehelenia and her Dead Moon Circus in order to protect Helios, a powerful priest from Prince Endymion's kingdom who has taken refuge within Chibiusa's dreams as a Pegasus.

Cloverway Inc. licensed Sailor Moon SuperS for an English-language broadcast in North America, with dubbing handled by Optimum Productions. The English dub aired on YTV in Canada and on Cartoon Network's Toonami programming block in the United States from 2000–02. It was the last Sailor Moon season licensed by Cloverway, the last dubbed by Optimum, and the last to air first on U.S. television. Pioneer Entertainment released edited and unedited versions of the dub on home video. In 2014, Viz Media licensed Sailor Moon for an updated English release produced by Studiopolis. Their re-dub of Sailor Moon SuperS was released in two volumes on DVD and Blu-ray: the first 18 episodes on April 24, 2018, and the other 19 episodes on November 13, 2018.

Three pieces of theme music were used: one opening theme and two ending themes. The opening theme, an updated version of "Moonlight Densetsu", is performed by MoonLips. The first ending theme, used for the first 13 episodes, is "Watashitachi ni Naritakute" performed by Miwako Fujitani. The second ending theme, used for the rest of the season, is "Rashiku' Ikimasho" performed by Miyuki Kajitani, who is credited as Meu. Cloverway used the English-language version of "Moonlight Densetsu" from DiC Entertainment's dub of the first season and Sailor Moon R.

== Episodes ==
No. overall	No. in season	Cloverway title Original Japanese and Viz titles	Directed by	Written by	Art director(s)	Animation director(s)	Original release date	English air date
128	1	"Dreams Take Flight" "Meeting of Destiny: The Night Pegasus Dances"; Transliteration: "Unmei no deai! Pegasasu no mau yoru" (Japanese: 運命の出会い!ペガサスの舞う夜)	Kunihiko Ikuhara	Yoji Enokido	Kazuyuki Hashimoto	Katsumi Tamegai	March 4, 1995	September 26, 2000
During a solar eclipse, a circus tent appears in the middle of town. Inside, the evil Dead Moon Circus makes plans to capture Pegasus. The same night Chibiusa has a dream about Pegasus in a forest. Later Tiger's Eye, a member of the Dead Moon Circus attacks Unazuki Furuhata, and Usagi and Chibiusa turn up and transform. Tiger's Eye summons a Lemures to fight. Then, Pegasus appears and powers up and evolves Sailor Moon and Sailor Chibi Moon into their much stronger and more powerful Super Sailor forms, giving them the extra strength and power to destroy the Lemures.
129	2	"No Ordinary Horsepower" "Super Transformation Once Again: Pegasus' Power"; Transliteration: "Supā henshin futatabi! Pegasasu no pawā" (Japanese: スーパー変身再び!ペガサスの力)	Noriyo Sasaki	Megumi Sugihara	Kenichi Tajiri	Mari Tominaga	March 11, 1995	September 27, 2000
Usagi and the others go back to the spot where Pegasus appeared. Usagi asks Chibiusa if she knows anything about Pegasus, but, keeping to her promise, Chibiusa says nothing. After hearing a horse, the team runs to look, where they see Reika Nishimura, who has returned from Africa. Usagi becomes concerned that she and Motoki Furuhata are having romantic relationship problems. Meanwhile, Tiger's Eye selects Reika as a target. During the battle Pegasus once again saves them.
130	3	"Sweet Dreams" "Protect Mom's Dream: Double Moon's New Attack"; Transliteration: "Mamore haha no yume! Daburu Mūn no shin hissatsu waza" (Japanese: 守れ母の夢!Wムーンの新必殺技)	Hiroki Shibata	Ryota Yamaguchi	Kazuhisa Asai	Hisashi Kagawa	March 18, 1995	September 28, 2000
Chibiusa has another dream about Pegasus, in which he tells her that whenever she and the Sailor Guardians are in trouble, she just has to call his name, though he disappears when she poses more questions. Meanwhile, the Dead Moon Circus plots to find more beautiful dreams. Hawk's Eye of the Dead Moon picks Ikuko Tsukino, Usagi's mother. During the battle, the Sailor Guardians are in trouble. Chibiusa summons Pegasus, he appears and changes Sailor Moon and Sailor Chibi Moon's lockets into their new Crisis Moon Compact and Chibi Moon Compact with the words Moon Crisis Make-Up to activate them. Pegasus also gives them new and much stronger weapons, the Kaleido Moon Scope for Sailor Moon, and the Crystal Carillon for Sailor Chibi-Moon.
131	4	"Baiting the Trap" "Catch Pegasus: The Amazon's Trap"; Transliteration: "Pegasasu wo toraero! Amazon no wana" (Japanese: ペガサスを捕えろ!アマゾンの罠)	Yūji Endō	Genki Yoshimura	Minoru Ōkōchi	Shinya Hasegawa	March 25, 1995	September 29, 2000
Hawk's Eye devises a cage that can create an inter-dimensional portal to capture and trap Pegasus. Tiger's Eye uses Naru Osaka as a bait in order to force Pegasus to appear so that he can trap him in the cage. The cage proves worthless and Pegasus simply goes through the cage as if it was not there.
132	5	"Perfect Couple" "The Perfect Couple: Usagi and Mamoru's Love"; Transliteration: "Oniai no futari! Usagi to Mamoru no ai" (Japanese: お似合いの二人!うさぎと衛の愛)	Junichi Sato	Yōji Enokido	Kazuhisa Asai	Masahiro Andō	April 15, 1995	October 2, 2000
One of Mamoru Chiba's best college friends is targeted. When attacked by the Lemures, Sailor Moon nearly suffocates to death. Chibiusa fears that she will not be born if Usagi and Mamoru break up will never to be exist.
133	6	"Much Ado About Kitten" "Artemis is Cheating? Enter the Mysterious Kitten"; Transliteration: "Arutemisu no uwaki? Nazo no koneko tōjō" (Japanese: アルテミスの浮気?謎の子猫登場)	Harume Kosaka	Megumi Sugihara	Kenichi Tajiri	Mari Tominaga	April 29, 1995	October 3, 2000
Luna grows jealous of Artemis' alleged love with a nun, though Artemis says it is a misunderstanding. Not long after, a gray kitten with a crescent moon mark on her forehead appears. She proclaims that she is Artemis' daughter, much to Luna's disgust. Even Minako Aino is angry at Artemis for not telling her that when she got a phone call from Usagi about the event. Meanwhile, the nun is targeted by Tiger's Eye. After a brutal battle, it is revealed that the gray kitten is Diana, Luna and Artemis' daughter from the future Crystal Tokyo and Chibiusa's guardian cat, as well as Artemis was actually into the chapel the nun lived in, thinking about marrying there.
134	7	"A Pegasus Page Turner" "Makoto's Friendship: A Girl Who Admired Pegasus"; Transliteration: "Makoto no yūjō! Tenba ni akogareta shōjo" (Japanese: まことの友情!天馬に憧れた少女)	Hiroki Shibata	Ryōta Yamaguchi	Minoru Ōkōchi	Katsumi Tamegai	May 13, 1995	October 4, 2000
A novel named "A Moonlit Pegasus" becomes popular. It turns out the author of the novel is Makoto Kino's former schoolmate and friend. Zirconia orders the Amazon Trio to check out the author since Pegasus might be in her dream.
135	8	"A Teacher's Lesson" "Connecting Hearts: Chibiusa and Pegasus"; Transliteration: "Fureau kokoro! Chibiusa to Pegasasu" (Japanese: 触れ合う心!ちびうさとペガサス)	Noriyo Sasaki	Yoji Enokido	Kazuyuki Hashimoto	Hisashi Kagawa	May 20, 1995	October 5, 2000
Tiger's Eye targets Chibiusa's art teacher, who had dreamed of being a teacher while she was a child but cannot communicate with children as well as she used to.
136	9	"The Trouble with Love" "Protect Mamoru: Ninja Usagi's Jealousy"; Transliteration: "Mamoru wo mamore! Ninja Usagi no yakimochi" (Japanese: 衛を守れ!忍者うさぎのヤキモチ)	Yūji Endō	Megumi Sugihara	Kazuhisa Asai	Shinya Hasegawa	May 27, 1995	October 6, 2000
Mamoru's apartment is wrecked, so he moves in with Rei Hino at the shrine temporarily. Usagi gets jealous and hides out at the shrine while wearing a ninja costume. Rei is then targeted by Tiger's Eye, preventing her from transforming into Sailor Mars.
137	10	"Phony Fairy" "Forest of Illusion: A Beautiful Fairy's Invitation"; Transliteration: "Ayakashi no mori! Utsukushiki yōsei no izanai" (Japanese: あやかしの森!美しき妖精の誘い)	Kunihiko Ikuhara	Genki Yoshimura	Kenichi Tajiri	Taichi Nakamura	June 3, 1995	October 9, 2000
Chibiusa gets a book containing fairy artwork. She bumps into the author of the book and makes good friends with him. Fisheye sees the author's picture and disguises himself as a fairy in order to be much closer to him.
138	11	"Driven Dreamer" "Drive to the Heavens: The Dream Car Fueled with Love"; Transliteration: "Tengoku made hashire! Yume no kuruma ni kakeru ai" (Japanese: 天国まで走れ!夢の車にかける愛)	Hiroki Shibata	Ryota Yamaguchi	Minoru Ōkōchi	Masahiro Andō	June 10, 1995	October 10, 2000
After thinking Mamoru is two-timing, Ami Mizuno learns that the woman seen with Mamoru is repairing a classical car in memory of her late husband. The woman is targeted by Hawk's Eye, who disguises himself as a look-alike of her husband.
139	12	"Cutting it Close" "Aiming for the Top: The Pretty Swordswoman's Dilemma"; Transliteration: "Mezase Nippon ichi! Bishōjo kenshi no nayami" (Japanese: 目指せ日本一!美少女剣士の悩み)	Harume Kosaka	Mutsuri Nakano	Kazuyuki Hashimoto	Ikuko Itō	June 17, 1995	October 11, 2000
A young girl aspires to be the top Samurai of Japan; however, she cannot surpass her mother, who is superior. When the girl is targeted by Tiger's Eye, the Sailor Guardians show her not to concentrate on only one thing.
140	13	"Clothes Call" "We Love Fashion: The Stylish Guardians"; Transliteration: "Mini ga daisuki! Oshare na Senshitachi" (Japanese: ミニが大好き!おしゃれな戦士達)	Junichi Sato	Genki Yoshimura	Kazuhisa Asai	Mari Tominaga	July 1, 1995	October 12, 2000
Fisheye targets a fashion designer. After being rescued by Sailor Moon, the fashion designer gets a new inspiration.
141	14	"Double Trouble" "Storm of Love: Minako's Grand Two-Timing Plan"; Transliteration: "Koi no arashi! Minako no futamata daisakusen" (Japanese: 恋の嵐!美奈子のフタマタ大作戦)	Takuya Igarashi	Ryota Yamaguchi	Kenichi Tajiri	Hisashi Kagawa	July 8, 1995	October 13, 2000
Minako is seen by her best friends to be two-timing two men. They are Tiger's Eye and Hawk's Eye, both assigned to look inside her dream mirror. Minako accidentally arranges to go on a romantic date with both of her suitors at the same time.
142	15	"Recipe for Danger" "The Secret Mansion: A Menu of Love for You"; Transliteration: "Himitsu no yakata! Ai no menyū wo anata ni" (Japanese: 秘密の館!愛のメニューを貴方に)	Yūji Endō	Megumi Sugihara	Minoru Ōkōchi	Katsumi Tamegai	July 15, 1995	October 16, 2000
A rude, rich, older woman takes care of Diana and is subsequently targeted by Hawk's Eye. Chibiusa visits the woman, who is lonely because her lover left her to pursue his dream of being a great chef.
143	16	"Kicking into High Gear" "Believe in Pegasus: The Four Guardians' Super Transformation"; Transliteration: "Pegasasu wo shinjiru toki! Yon Senshi no supā henshin" (Japanese: 天馬を信じる時!4戦士の超変身)	Noriyo Sasaki	Yoji Enokido	Kazuyuki Hashimoto	Taichi Nakamura	July 22, 1995	October 17, 2000
When an ersatz Pegasus destroys cars and trucks, it is actually the work of a Lemures. After getting trapped in a barrier, Sailor Chibi-Moon begs the four Sailor Guardians to believe in Pegasus, and they are given their newly strengthened and evolved Super Sailor forms and transformations by Pegasus; and are now much stronger and more powerful than ever just like Super Sailor Moon, and Super Sailor Chibi-Moon.
144	17	"Beach Blanket Bungle" "Shining Summer Days: Ami Under the Sea-Breeze"; Transliteration: "Kirameku natsu no hi! Shiokaze no shōjo Ami" (Japanese: きらめく夏の日!潮風の少女亜美)	Hiroki Shibata	Ryota Yamaguchi	Kazuhisa Asai	Masahiro Andō	August 12, 1995	October 18, 2000
Ami, Usagi, and Shingo, as well as Rei, Makoto and Minako, go to the beach. Shingo nearly drowns, and Ami performs CPR on him. Shingo gets a huge platonic crush on Ami, and soon after Tiger's Eye targets her, even preventing Ami from transforming into Sailor Mercury.
145	18	"Tutu Treachery" "Become a Prima: Usagi's Ballet"; Transliteration: "Purima wo nerae! Usagi no barei" (Japanese: プリマをねらえ!うさぎのバレエ)	Harume Kosaka	Genki Yoshimura	Kenichi Tajiri	Mari Tominaga	August 19, 1995	October 19, 2000
Usagi volunteers to be part of a ballet production. Fisheye joins the same class as Usagi and targets the ballet instructor. In the end, Usagi winds up playing the part of the Moon in the production.
146	19	"The Duchess' Day Off" "Juban Holiday: The Carefree Princess"; Transliteration: "Jūbangai no kyūjitsu! Mujaki na ōjosama" (Japanese: 十番街の休日!無邪気な王女様)	Junichi Sato	Megumi Sugihara	Minoru Ōkōchi	Miho Shimogasa	August 26, 1995	October 20, 2000
In an homage to the classic film Roman Holiday, Chibiusa and Usagi meet a runaway duchess. They go to the summer festival together, but the duchess is chased by her government and targeted by Hawk's Eye.
147	20	"No Prince Charming" "Destined Partners? Makoto's Innocence"; Transliteration: "Unmei no pātonā? Makoto no junjō" (Japanese: 運命のパートナー?まことの純情)	Yūji Endō	Ryota Yamaguchi	Kazuyuki Hashimoto	Hisashi Kagawa	September 2, 1995	October 23, 2000
Tiger's Eye targets Makoto, who believes that she has met her destined lover. After Super Sailor Moon and Super Sailor Chibi-Moon get trapped, a furious Super Sailor Jupiter uses her new Superior Sparkling Thunder attack and stops the Lemures.
148	21	"A True Reflection" "Shadow of Evil: The Trio's Last Chance"; Transliteration: "Kyoaku no kage! Oitsumerareta torio" (Japanese: 巨悪の影!追いつめられたトリオ)	Kōnosuke Uda	Yoji Enokido	Kazuhisa Asai	Taichi Nakamura	September 23, 1995	October 24, 2000
Learning that only Pegasus can help the Amazon Trio to remain in present human form, Fisheye targets Mamoru, with whom he falls in love, and is later befriended by Usagi.: Queen Nehelenia makes her debut as a silhouette
149	22	"Eternal Dreams" "Mirrors of Dreams: The Amazon's Last Stage"; Transliteration: "Yume no kagami! Amazon saigo no sutēji" (Japanese: 夢の鏡!アマゾン最後のステージ)	Hiroki Shibata	Yoji Enokido	Kenichi Tajiri	Katsumi Tamegai	October 21, 1995	October 25, 2000
Fisheye finds out that Usagi is Super Sailor Moon. After learning that Pegasus is hiding in Chibiusa's dream, Fisheye freezes her and reports back to Zirconia. Zirconia then targets Usagi as the person in whose dream Pegasus is hiding. When Hawk's Eye is about to look into Usagi's dream mirror, Fisheye stops him. Soon after, a Lemure breaks Usagi's mirror, killing her, then later killing Hawk's Eye, who protects Fisheye. The trio dies after wishing for Usagi's dream mirror to repair itself. However, Pegasus uses the tremendous strength of the Golden Crystal to return them to life and transform them into complete humans, with their very own beautiful dreams.
150	23	"A New Nightmare" "The Amazoness: Nightmare from Behind the Mirrors"; Transliteration: "Amazonesu! Kagami no ura kara kita akumu" (Japanese: アマゾネス!鏡の裏から来た悪夢)	Kunihiko Ikuhara	Yoji Enokido	Minoru Ōkōchi	Masahiro Andō	October 28, 1995	October 26, 2000
Chibiusa's friend Momoko Momohara is targeted by the Amazoness Quartet who have replaced the trio. Queen Nehelenia has Zirconia still use the Amazoness Quartet, despite their desire to take Pegasus for themselves.
151	24	"Heartfelt Melody" "True Power Explodes: Ami's Melody of the Heart"; Transliteration: "Shin no pawā bakuhatsu! Ami kokoro no shirabe" (Japanese: 真のパワー爆発!亜美心のしらべ)	Takuya Igarashi	Ryota Yamaguchi	Kazuyuki Hashimoto	Mari Tominaga	November 4, 1995	October 27, 2000
Ami writes lyrics to a song, whilst VesVes of the Amazoness Quartet targets the song's composer. VesVes traps the Sailor Guardians inside a computer, and Super Sailor Mercury's newest transformation, "Mercury Crystal Power, Make Up!" and much stronger water-based attack, Mercury Aqua Rhapsody! are shown for the first time.
152	25	"Dreams of Her Own" "Flames of Passion: Mars' Raging Super Attack"; Transliteration: "Honō no jōnetsu! Māzu ikari no chōhissatsu waza" (Japanese: 炎の情熱!マーズ怒りの超必殺技)	Harume Kosaka	Megumi Sugihara	Kazuhisa Asai	Ikuko Itō	November 11, 1995	December 21, 2000
When Rei is featured in a magazine, she gains a huge supporter, a girl by the name of Nanako. However, after hearing how Rei really thinks of Nanako, she is targeted and Super Sailor Mars' newest Super transformation, "Mars Crystal Power, Make Up!" and much stronger fire/flame-based attack, Mars Flame Sniper! are used for the first time.
153	26	"Dental Dilemma" "Dentist of Horrors? PallaPalla's House"; Transliteration: "Kyōfu no haishasan? ParaPara no yakata" (Japanese: 恐怖の歯医者さん?パラパラの館)	Noriyo Sasaki	Genki Yoshimura	Kazuyuki Hashimoto	Masahiro Andō	November 18, 1995	October 30, 2000
The Amazoness PallaPalla first inflicts a magical pandemic of cavities and then establishes a dentist's office.
154	27	"Nightmare Garden" "Clash of Dreams: Minako and Makoto's Broken Friendship"; Transliteration: "Yume taiketsu! Minako to Makoto zekkō sengen" (Japanese: 夢対決!美奈子とまこと絶交宣言)	Yūji Endō	Ryota Yamaguchi	Kazuhisa Asai	Shigetaka Kiyoyama	November 25, 1995	October 31, 2000
Minako and Makoto both romantically pursue the principal of a preschool and fight over him. The principal is targeted, Super Sailor Venus and Super Sailor Jupiter transform and unleash their dormant Super Sailor powers. Their newest, stronger Super transformations – Jupiter Crystal Power, Make Up! and Venus Crystal Power, Make Up! – and attacks as Super Sailor Guardians, Venus Love and Beauty Shock! and Jupiter Oak Evolution! are used for the first time.
155	28	"Vaulting to Victory" "Overcome Your Fear: The Jump to Freedom"; Transliteration: "Kyōfu wo koete! Jiyū he no jampu" (Japanese: 恐怖を越えて!自由へのジャンプ)	Kōnosuke Uda	Megumi Sugihara	Minoru Ōkōchi	Miho Shimogasa	December 2, 1995	November 1, 2000
Chibiusa's friend Kyusuke Sarashina worries about the upcoming athletics carnival and is targeted by JunJun.
156	29	"Reflections of Reality" "Don't Lose Sight of Your Dreams: The Mirror of Truth"; Transliteration: "Yume wo miushinawanaide! Shinjitsu wo utsusu kagami" (Japanese: 夢を見失わないで!真実を映す鏡)	Takuya Igarashi	Genki Yoshimura	Kazuhisa Asai	Katsumi Tamegai	December 9, 1995	November 2, 2000
CereCere targets a literal starving artist who Usagi and Chibiusa meet in the park.
157	30	"Dream Believer" "Pegasus Disappears: Wavering Friendship"; Transliteration: "Pegasasu ga kieta!? Yure ugoku yūjō" (Japanese: ペガサスが消えた!?ゆれ動く友情)	Harume Kosaka	Ryota Yamaguchi	Kazuyuki Hashimoto	Yūji Kondō	December 16, 1995	November 3, 2000
Chibiusa, doubtful of Pegasus' friendship as he has not told her about himself, questions him. Pegasus leaves as he cannot reveal anything yet. During a conversation with Usagi, Chibiusa realizes that there are certain things that have to remain secret, and Pegasus returns to her.
158	31	"Pegasus Revealed" "Pegasus' Secret: The Boy Who Protects the Dream World"; Transliteration: "Pegasasu no himitsu! Yume sekai wo mamoru bishōnen" (Japanese: 天馬の秘密!夢世界を守る美少年)	Junichi Sato	Genki Yoshimura	Minoru Ōkōchi	Mamoru Kurosawa	December 23, 1995	November 6, 2000
Chibiusa's dream of being an adult comes true when, due to an attack by PallaPalla, she artificially switches ages with Usagi, who in turn wished that she was a child so she didn't have to do "hard math problems." As Chibiusa has achieved her dream, Pegasus says that he has lost sight of hers in turn. Stating that they cannot be together if she remains an adult, Pegasus turns to leave. Not wanting to lose him, Chibiusa chooses her deep and strong friendship for Pegasus instead of her dream to be an adult, thus breaking the spell, and shares a romantic kiss with Helios, who is Pegasus' true form.
159	32	"Rini's Lovely Rhapsody" "Chibi-Usa's Little Rhapsody of Love"; Transliteration: "Chibiusa no chiisana koi no rapusodi" (Japanese: ちびうさの小さな恋のラプソディ)	Kunihiko Ikuhara	Megumi Sugihara	Kazuhisa Asai	Ikuko Itō	January 13, 1996	November 7, 2000
The girls try to find out who Chibiusa is in love with. Makoto insists it's a senpai, but Rei says that is not the case. When Chibiusa says she likes a pale guy with an oblong face, Ami and Minako mistake a passerby feeding fish for Chibiusa's boyfriend. The passerby is targeted, and when the Sailor Guardians arrive, each says something about getting in the way of close, strong romance, leaving Sailor Chibi-Moon flustered and confused.
160	33	"Tomorrow's Big Dreams" "Dream to Be an Adult: The Amazoness' Confusion"; Transliteration: "Otona ni naru yume! Amazonesu no tōwaku" (Japanese: 大人になる夢!アマゾネスの当惑)	Harume Kosaka	Megumi Sugihara	Kenichi Tajiri	Masahiro Andō	January 20, 1996	November 8, 2000
Minako forces the rest of the girls to do volunteer work at a Maturity Ceremony because there are many "cute" boys there. The Amazoness Quartet also volunteer but have no clue about what a Maturity Ceremony is. They make friends with the girls.
161	34	"Day of Night" "Terror in Motion: The Dark Queen's Evil Hand"; Transliteration: "Ugoki dashita kyōfu! Yami no joō no mashu" (Japanese: 動き出した恐怖!闇の女王の魔手)	Noriyo Sasaki	Genki Yoshimura	Tadao Kubota	Shigetaka Kiyoyama	January 27, 1996	November 9, 2000
Queen Nehelenia prepares to escape from her mirror and plunges the city into darkness. Mamoru, as Prince of Earth, is hurt as the Earth is in danger. The Amazoness Quartet and Sailor Guardians both learn each others' identities.
162	35	"Show Time Showdown" "The Source of Darkness: Dead Moon Circus"; Transliteration: "Yami no shingenchi Deddo Mūn Sākasu" (Japanese: 闇の震源地デッドムーンサーカス)	Yūji Endō	Ryota Yamaguchi	Minoru Ōkōchi	Minako Ito	February 3, 1996	November 10, 2000
Queen Nehelenia grants extra and stronger abilities to the Amazoness Quartet. The Super Sailor Guardians fight against the Amazoness Quartet but are easily defeated due to the imbalance of power. Super Sailor Moon uses her Moon Gorgeous Meditation attack, but it fails when Zirconia arrives. Zircon brings out Super Sailor Mini Moon's dream-mirror, which is the golden mirror itself, harboring the spirit of Helios, in the dream form of Pegasus. Zirconia informs Queen Nehelenia of their success, that Pegasus and the Golden Crystal now belong to the Dead Moon.
163	36	"The Dark Legend" "Labyrinth of Mirrors: Chibi Moon Captured"; Transliteration: "Kagami no meikyū! Toraerareta Chibi Mūn" (Japanese: 鏡の迷宮!捕えられたちびムーン)	Harume Kosaka	Yoji Enokido	Kazuyuki Hashimoto	Mari Tominaga	February 10, 1996	November 13, 2000
The Super Sailor Guardians get separated in a Labyrinth of Mirrors. Zirconia uses the mirrors to try to force them to give up fighting, but the team knows that they still have their normal dreams, even though their bigger dream is to be Sailor Guardians. The Amazoness Quartet switch Super Sailor Chibi-Moon with a doll so they could ride on Pegasus.
164	37	"One in the Hand" "The Golden Crystal Appears: Nehellenia's Magic"; Transliteration: "Gōruden Kurisutaru shutsugen! Neherenia no maryoku" (Japanese: 黄金水晶出現!ネヘレニアの魔力)	Takuya Igarashi	Yoji Enokido	Kenichi Tajiri	Masahiro Andō	February 17, 1996	November 14, 2000
The Amazoness Quartet decide to break the Amazon Stones, which give them their powers, thus freeing them from being controlled by Queen Nehelenia. Nehelenia then forces Helios to give up the Golden Crystal, destroying Zirconia while emerging from her dream-mirror prison before proceeding to blanket the world in darkness.
165	38	"Golden Revival" "When the Crystal Shines: The Beautiful Power of Dreams"; Transliteration: "Kurisutaru kagayaku toki! Utsukushiki yume no chikara" (Japanese: クリスタル輝く時!美しき夢の力)	Yūji Endō	Yoji Enokido	Kenichi Tajiri	Takayuki Ushirai	February 24, 1996	November 15, 2000
The Amazoness Quartet switch the Golden Crystal with a pineapple. Nehelenia tells the Sailor Guardians that they cannot use the Crystal as it requires the dream energy from people's beautiful dreams in order to be effective. Super Sailor Chibi Moon manages to use the Golden Crystal to send a message to everyone, telling them not to give up their sweet dreams. A big explosion of golden light happens.
166	39	"The Sweetest Dream" "Dreams Forever: Fill the Heavens with Light"; Transliteration: "Yume yo itsumademo! Hikari, ten ni michite" (Japanese: 夢よいつまでも!光, 天に満ちて)	Kunihiko Ikuhara	Yoji Enokido	Kazuhisa Asai	Ikuko Itō	March 2, 1996	November 16, 2000
Chibiusa attempts to use the Golden Crystal to destroy Queen Nehelenia and the Dead Moon Circus but is captured and knocked unconscious. When Sailor Moon gets to Nehelenia on the floating platform, she sees that Queen Nehelenia's aged appearance as a result of Chibiusa's use of the Golden Crystal. Nehelenia explains that she was once queen of an asteroid and she was worshiped for her beauty by her people until she asked her dream mirror if she would stay beautiful forever. But upon seeing the ugly, old woman she would become, Nehelenia consumed her servants' Dream Mirrors, turning them into Lemures while retaining her youth and beauty, and was consequently sealed away by Queen Serenity. With Sailor Moon pities her, an infuriated Nehelenia throws Chibiusa over the edge of the platform. Sailor Moon dives after her and transforms into Princess Serenity; she catches up to Chibiusa, awakens her, and together they use the Golden Crystal to land safely on Earth. At that time, Nehelenia reseals herself back into the mirror to regain her beauty as it flies off. Chibiusa says goodbye to Helios, who returns to his homeworld of Elysion, and says that she will see him in her dreams.

=== Specials ===
No.	Original Japanese title	Episode director(s)	Writer(s)	Animation director(s)	Original air date
1	"An Elegant Metamorphosis? Crybaby Usagi's Growth Diary"; Transliteration: "Karei ni Henshin? Nakimushi Usagi no Seichōkiroku" (Japanese: 華麗に変身？泣き虫うさぎの成長記録)	Kounosuke Uda	Yoji Enokido	Taichi Nakamura	April 8, 1995
In a short recap of the first three seasons, Usagi and Luna tell Chibiusa about Usagi's growth as Sailor Moon.
2	"Haruka and Michiru, Again! The Ghostly Puppet Show"; Transliteration: "Haruka Michiru futatabi! Bōrei ningyō geki" (Japanese: はるかみちる再び！亡霊人形劇)	Kounosuke Uda	Megumi Sugihara	Taichi Nakamura	April 8, 1995
Haruka and Michiru are at a hotel that is being taken over by a puppet and his master. Haruka is feeling sick and unable to battle, so Michiru transforms into Sailor Neptune to destroy the puppet's bottle in order to save Haruka, risking the lives of the hotel guests in the process. Haruka is healed and transforms into Sailor Uranus and defeats the puppet. She then quickly worries about a new enemy, but Michiru assures her that Sailor Moon and the rest will take care of it.
3	"Chibiusa's Adventure! The Dreaded Vampire Castle"; Transliteration: "Chibiusa no bōken! Kyōfu, kyūketsuki no yakata" (Japanese: ちびうさの冒険！恐怖、吸血鬼の館)	Kounosuke Uda	Genki Yoshimura	Taichi Nakamura	April 8, 1995
A new student shows up in Chibiusa's class named Lilika. Strange things begin to happen – children go missing, flowers die, and the new girl is doing weird things. The Sailor Guardians investigate, and Lilika is revealed to be a vampire. They use an attack on her, and she is released from the spell, only remembering everything as a bad dream.

== Home video releases ==
=== English ===
==== DVD ====
===== United States =====
Pioneer Entertainment (Region 1)
Volume	Episodes	Release date	Ref.
Pegasus Collection I	128–133 (121–126 edited)	January 29, 2002	
Pegasus Collection II	134–139 (127–132 edited)	March 19, 2002	
Pegasus Collection III	140–145 (133–138 edited)	June 11, 2002	
Pegasus Collection IV	146–151 (139–144 edited)	September 3, 2002	
Pegasus Collection V	152–157 (145–150 edited)	November 19, 2002	
Pegasus Collection VI	158–163 (151–156 edited)	February 18, 2003	
Pegasus Collection VII	164–166 (157–159 edited)	May 13, 2003	
Sailor Moon Super S – The Complete Uncut TV Set	128–166 (121–159 edited)	August 3, 2004	

Viz Media (Region 1)
Volume	Episodes	Release date	Ref.
Season 4 Part 1	128–146	April 24, 2018	
Season 4 Part 2	147–166	November 13, 2018	

===== Australia and New Zealand =====
Madman Entertainment (Region 4)
Volume	Episodes	Release date	Ref.
Season 4 Part 1	128–146	June 6, 2018	
Season 4 Part 2	147–166	February 6, 2019	

==== Blu-ray ====
===== Japan =====
Toei Video (Region 2)
Volume	Episodes	Release date	Ref.
美少女戦士セーラームーンSuperS BLU-RAY COLLECTION	1	128-149	May 8, 2019
美少女戦士セーラームーンSuperS BLU-RAY COLLECTION	2	150-166	July 10, 2019

===== United States =====
Viz Media (Region A)
Volume	Episodes	Release date	Ref.
Season 4 Part 1	128–146	April 24, 2018	
Season 4 Part 2	147–166	November 13, 2018	
Complete Fourth Season	128-166 + Special	January 30, 2024	

===== Australia and New Zealand =====
Madman Entertainment (Region B)
Volume	Episodes	Release date	Ref.
Season 4 Part 1	128–146	June 6, 2018	
Season 4 Part 2	147–166	February 6, 2019	

== Film ==
Sailor Moon SuperS: The Movie, originally released Japan as Pretty Soldier Sailor Moon SuperS: The Nine Sailor Soldiers Unite! Miracle of the Black Dream Hole (美少女戦士セーラームーンSuperS(スーパーズ) セーラー9戦士集結！ブラック・ドリーム・ホールの奇跡, Bishōjo Senshi Sērā Mūn Sūpāzu: Sērā Kyū Senshi Shūketsu! Burakku Dorīmu Hōru no Kiseki), and later as Pretty Guardian Sailor Moon SuperS: The Nine Sailor Guardians Unite! Miracle of the Black Dream Hole, and released in the U.S. as Sailor Moon SuperS: The Movie: Black Dream Hole in the Pioneer Entertainment dub, and simply Sailor Moon SuperS: The Movie in Viz media re-dub, is an anime film directed by Hiroki Shibata and animated by Toei Animation. The film debuted in Japanese theaters on December 23, 1995, accompanied by a 16-minute short film titled Sailor Moon SuperS Plus: Ami's First Love (美少女戦士セーラームーンSuperS外伝 亜美ちゃんの初恋, Bishōjo Senshi Sērā Mūn Sūpāzu Gaiden: Ami-chan no Hatsu-koi).

== Video games ==
Several video games were released to promote this season, most of them developed or published by Bandai. In 1995, a puzzle video game titled Bishoujo Senshi Sailor Moon SuperS: Fuwa Fuwa Panic was developed by Tom Create and published by Bandai for Super Nintendo Entertainment System. The next year, also for Super NES the fighting game Bishoujo Senshi Sailor Moon SuperS: Zenin Sanka! Shuyaku Soudatsusen was developed by Monolith Soft and published by Angel, a subsidiary company of Bandai. In the same year, Bishoujo Senshi Sailor Moon SuperS: Various Emotion was released for Sega Saturn. Angel also published Bishōjo Senshi Sailor Moon SuperS: Shin Shuyaku Sōdatsusen for PlayStation. Three miscellaneous game titled Bishoujo Senshi Sailor Moon SuperS: Sailor Moon to Hiragana Lesson!, Bishoujo Senshi Sailor Moon SuperS: Youkoso! Sailor Youchien, and Bishoujo Senshi Sailor Moon SuperS: Sailor Moon to Hajimete no Eigo were released for Playdia in 1995.
