= Sailor Moon (TV series) =

Japanese anime television series

- English logo used since 2011
- Japanese: 美少女戦士セーラームーン
- Literal meaning: Pretty Soldier Sailor Moon
- Revised Hepburn: Bishōjo Senshi Serā Mūn
- Also known as: Pretty Guardian Sailor Moon
- Genre: Magical girl
- Based on: Sailor Moon by Naoko Takeuchi
- Directed by: Junichi Sato (season 1); Kunihiko Ikuhara (R–SuperS); Takuya Igarashi (Sailor Stars)
- Series composition: Sukehiro Tomita (season 1–S); Yōji Enokido (SuperS); Ryōta Yamaguchi (Sailor Stars)
- Character designers: Kazuko Tadano (Season 1–R); Ikuko Itoh (S–SuperS); Katsumi Tamegai (Sailor Stars)
- Music by: Takanori Arisawa
- Opening themes: "Moonlight Densetsu" by DALI (Episodes 1-89) and Moon Lips (Episodes 90-166) "Sailor Star Song" by Kae Hanazawa (Episodes 167-200)
- Country of origin: Japan
- Original language: Japanese
- No. of seasons: 5
- No. of episodes: 200 + 3 TV specials (list of episodes)

Production
- Art directors: Junichi Taniguchi (Season 1–R); Takamura Mukuo (S–Sailor Stars)
- Editor: Yasuhiro Yoshikawa
- Producers: Iriya Azuma (season 1–SuperS); Kenji Ōta; Toshihiko Arisako (SuperS–Sailor Stars); Kōichi Yada (SuperS–Sailor Stars)
- Production companies: TV Asahi; Toei Advertising; Toei Animation

Original release
- Network: ANN (TV Asahi)
- Release: March 7, 1992 – February 8, 1997

Related
- Film series: Sailor Moon R: The Movie (1993); Sailor Moon S: The Movie (1994); Sailor Moon SuperS: The Movie (1995)

Sailor Moon (Note: Japanese: 美少女戦士セーラームーン, Hepburn: Bishōjo Senshi Sērā Mūn; Originally translated as Pretty Soldier Sailor Moon, later as Pretty Guardian Sailor Moon) is a Japanese anime television series based on the manga of the same title written and illustrated by Naoko Takeuchi. Produced by Toei Animation and directed by Junichi Sato (Season 1), Kunihiko Ikuhara (R–SuperS) and Takuya Igarashi (Sailor Stars), it is the first anime adaptation of the manga. Set in the 1990s, the series follows the adventures of Usagi Tsukino, a middle school student who is given the power to transform into the titular character. Joined by other Sailor Guardians, she defends Earth against an assortment of evil villains. Sailor Moon aired on TV Asahi from March 7, 1992 to February 8, 1997.

Sailor Moon's popularity has spawned numerous additional media based on its universe, including films, video games, and soundtracks. It was later dubbed for release in various regions around the world, including North America, Southeast Asia, Greater China, Australia, Europe, and Latin America.

== Plot ==
=== Sailor Moon (1992–1993) ===
Set in Tokyo in the 1990s, a 14-year-old underachieving young schoolgirl named Usagi Tsukino meets a magical talking cat named Luna. Luna gives Usagi the ability to transform into a magical alter ego—Sailor Moon—tasked with locating the moon princess and battling the evil forces of the Dark Kingdom. When Usagi transforms for the first time into her magical sailor suit with Luna's help, she overreacts and reluctantly accepts her fate, not sure what has happened to her. At the time she does not know the enemies she will face, the friends she will make, or the experiences ahead of her. As she moves forward, she accepts her destiny, and realizes the importance of fighting evil.

The Dark Kingdom—led by Queen Beryl—summons various monsters called Youma in order to sap energy from humans and feed it to an evil entity and supreme ruler known as Queen Matalia. They also seek the Silver Crystal (｢幻の銀水晶｣, Maboroshi no Ginzuishō; lit. "Phantom Silver Crystal"), a gem capable of limitless power. As Usagi battles against the Dark Kingdom, she is joined by other girls also awakening as Sailor Guardians: the timid but intelligent Ami Mizuno (Sailor Mercury), the hot-headed miko Rei Hino (Sailor Mars), the tomboyish but romantic Makoto Kino (Sailor Jupiter), and the aspiring idol Minako Aino (Sailor Venus). Minako is joined by Artemis, her feline advisor and Luna's partner. The Sailor Guardians are often supported by the mysterious Tuxedo Mask whose civilian form is Mamoru Chiba, a college student with whom Usagi eventually becomes romantically involved.

After continually thwarting the Dark Kingdom and defeating several of its generals, Usagi awakens as the moon princess—Princess Serenity—and acquires the Silver Crystal. However, Mamoru is captured by the Dark Kingdom and brainwashed into working for them. The Sailor Guardians learn of their past lives on Silver Millennium, an ancient kingdom on the moon. There, they served as Serenity's friends and bodyguards, and Serenity was in love with a prince from Earth named Endymion (Mamoru's past identity). However, the Dark Kingdom attacked and destroyed Silver Millennium, resulting in the deaths of Serenity, Endymion, and the Sailor Guardians. Serenity's mother—Queen Serenity—used the power of the Silver Crystal to vanquish Queen Matalia and end the war. She also used the crystal to send the fallen Sailor Guardians into the future to be reborn on Earth, hoping to give them a second chance at peace.

The Sailor Guardians eventually pinpoint the location of the Dark Kingdom at the North Pole and travel there. However, Usagi's friends are killed trying to protect her from Queen Beryl's most powerful monsters, the DD Girls. Usagi faces the brainwashed Mamoru alone and frees him from Queen Beryl's control. However, Mamoru is killed protecting Usagi while also striking down Queen Beryl. Using the Silver Crystal, she then faces Queen Beryl (who has fused with Queen Matalia) as Princess Serenity, defeating her with the help of the fallen Sailor Guardians' spirits and the Silver Crystal's power. Usagi dies afterwards, but she is able to use the last of the Silver Crystal's power to resurrect herself, the Sailor Guardians and Mamoru with one wish that they all get to live normal lives again. Everything on Earth is returned to normal, and no one but Artemis and Luna retain any memories of these events.

=== Sailor Moon R (1993–1994) ===
Sometime later, a pair of extraterrestrials named Ail and An descend onto Earth with the Makai Tree, which feeds on human energy. Ail and An summon monsters from cards—called Cardians—to prey on humans. In order to defend against these attacks, Luna restores the Sailor Guardians' memories. Eventually, Ail and An are defeated, see the error of their ways, and return to space with the Makai Tree. During these events, Mamoru is able to reclaim his lost memories and begins a romantic relationship with Usagi.

Shortly after these events, a pink-haired girl named Chibiusa falls from the sky, revealing that she traveled from the future in order to find the Silver Crystal and use it to save her parents. She is followed by the Black Moon Clan, an enemy from the future that is trying to kill her and alter the past to further their goals. Eventually, the Sailor Guardians and Tuxedo Mask travel with Chibiusa to the future where Usagi rules Crystal Tokyo as Neo-Queen Serenity. They learn that Chibiusa is actually Usagi and Mamoru's future daughter, and they also meet Sailor Pluto who guards the Door of Space-Time. Eventually, the Sailor Guardians battle against Death Phantom, who manipulated the Black Moon Clan with the goal of destroying Earth. Death Phantom manipulates Chibiusa into becoming his minion, Black Lady, but the Sailor Guardians eventually manage to free her of his control. Chibiusa is able to summon the Silver Crystal of the future and aids in the destruction of Death Phantom. Afterwards, Chibiusa returns to her own time, now freed from the Black Moon Clan's corruption.

=== Sailor Moon S (1994–1995) ===
Some time later, the Sailor Guardians encounter the Death Busters, an evil organization based in the prestigious Mugen Academy that is summoning monsters called Daimons to steal Heart Crystals from humans. Their intention is to locate three specific Pure Heart Crystals that contain special Talismans. Joining the Sailor Soldiers are Haruka Tenoh and Michiru Kaioh, who operate as Sailor Uranus and Sailor Neptune respectively. The two are also seeking the Talismans for different purposes and come into conflict with the other Sailor Guardians. Sailor Pluto returns to the present day as Setsuna Meioh; Chibiusa also returns, now donning her own magical girl identity of Sailor Chibi Moon.

The Death Busters eventually discover that Haruka and Michiru hold two of the Talismans and acquire them at the cost of their lives, but Setsuna—who holds the third—revives them. The Talismans create the Holy Grail, allowing Usagi to acquire a more powerful form: Super Sailor Moon. The Death Busters's intentions then change to harvesting Pure Heart Crystals en masse to resurrect the malevolent entity known as Mistress 9, while Uranus, Neptune, and Pluto now seek the true Messiah, who can effectively wield the Holy Grail to stop the Death Busters. Chibiusa also befriends a sickly girl named Hotaru, unaware that she is the daughter of the Death Busters's leader, Professor Tomoe. Unknown to her, Hotaru is also Sailor Saturn, a Sailor Guardian capable of destroying entire planets. Haruka, Michiru and Setsuna fear that Saturn's awakening will result in Earth's destruction and plead for Usagi to kill her, but she refuses.

Mistress 9 is revealed to have been residing within Hotaru's body and awakens upon stealing Chibiusa's Pure Heart Crystal. The Sailor Guardians go to Mugen Academy to stop the Death Busters and save Chibiusa, Hotaru, and the world. Mistress 9 prevents all but Sailor Moon from entering the academy, though Pluto sacrifices her life to help Uranus and Neptune secretly infiltrate the academy as well. The other Sailor Guardians erect a barrier to keep the enemy from expanding further through the city. Mistress 9 then tricks Usagi into handing over the Holy Grail, allowing her to summon Death Busters's true mastermind Pharaoh 90 to destroy the Earth. Hotaru awakens as Sailor Saturn, destroying Mistress 9, and intends to sacrifice herself to destroy Pharaoh 90. Usagi is able to activate her Super form once again to assist Saturn in destroying Pharaoh 90 and rescue Saturn.

Hotaru is reborn as a baby and returned to her father, now freed from the influence of the Death Busters. Uranus and Neptune then challenge Sailor Moon to a final fight to prove to them and everyone that she is the true Messiah and the future Queen of Silver Millennium. After the final fight, they both acknowledge her as their true Messiah and future Neo Queen and leave the city knowing their mission is now over. Following this, Chibiusa receives a letter from her parents from the future wanting her to return home, but upon helping the Sailor Soldiers and Tuxedo Mask defeat the last Daimon monster, she decides to stay in the present a bit longer.

=== Sailor Moon SuperS (1995–1996) ===
Chibiusa meets a winged unicorn named Pegasus who hides in dreams and forms a secret relationship with her. Pegasus also aids the Sailor Guardians by upgrading them to permanent Super forms and lending his power when summoned by Chibiusa. The new powers are used to combat the Dead Moon Circus, a mysterious circus troupe that targets humans with beautiful dreams. They are led by Zirconia and her minions, the Amazon Trio, who are tasked with looking into humans' Dream Mirrors, hoping to find Pegasus, believing Pegasus possesses the Golden Crystal. With this crystal, the Dead Moon Circus's ruler—Queen Nehelenia—can be freed from the mirror she was sealed in.

It is revealed that Queen Nehelenia was once a queen of her own kingdom who was absorbed by vanity. In fear of losing her beauty, she consumed the dreams of her subjects to stay young. She sought the Golden Crystal in the possession of a priest named Helios (Pegasus's true form) and was sealed within a mirror by Queen Serenity as a result. Queen Nehelenia formed the Dead Moon Circus with the purpose of tracking Pegasus down. Although she obtains the Golden Crystal, she is betrayed by her minions, the Amazoness Quartet who give the crystal to Chibiusa. Using the crystal, Queen Nehelenia is defeated and begins to wither with age, forcing her back into the mirror she was once sealed within. Helios returns to his home realm of Elysion.

Uranus and Neptune are featured in an episode special that indicates that they are aware of the threat of Dead Moon Circus, but determine that the others are able to handle it on their own without their intervention. (Note: Unlike the manga, the Outer Sailor Guardians are not otherwise mentioned or involved in the anime's adaptation of the story arc until the following season)

=== Sailor Moon Sailor Stars (1996–1997) ===
The Dead Moon Circus arc concludes when Queen Nehelenia returns after Sailor Galaxia frees her and encourages her to seek revenge against the Sailor Guardians, especially Sailor Moon. The Outer Sailor Guardians—Uranus, Neptune, Pluto, and Saturn—return, now with their more powerful Super forms to assist the others. Queen Nehelenia places a curse on all mirrors throughout the city, which entrances the civilian population. She then captures Mamoru, who is under her curse, threatening the future and risking erasing Chibiusa from existence. The Sailor Guardians enter Queen Nehelenia's nightmare dimension to stop her. Usagi eventually comes to pity Queen Nehelenia's plight and is able to purify her by activating her extremely powerful final form, Eternal Sailor Moon.

Shortly after these events, Mamoru leaves for the United States to study abroad while Usagi and her friends enter high school. Chibiusa also returns to her own time. A group of enemies called the Sailor Animamates—led by Sailor Galaxia—begin targeting humans for their Star Seeds (which serve as a human's life force). Usagi is also aided by the Sailor Starlights—Kou Seiya (Sailor Star Fighter), Kou Taiki (Sailor Star Maker), and Kou Yaten (Sailor Star Healer)—who disguise themselves as an idol group named the Three Lights. The Starlights are searching for their ruler, Princess Kakyuu. A young girl—nicknamed Chibi Chibi because of her limited vocabulary that usually involves the word "chibi"—also appears and begins living with Usagi.

Sailor Galaxia's past is eventually revealed: she once ended the Sailor Wars by sealing Chaos—the source of all malice—within her body. Unable to resist Chaos's influence, she separated her Star Seed from her body, and it took the form of Chibi Chibi. Sailor Galaxia steals the Star Seeds of Princess Kakyuu and all Usagi's companions, resulting in their deaths. This also includes Mamoru who was targeted and killed before he arrived in the United States. Chibi Chibi transforms into the Sword of Sealing and urges Usagi to kill Sailor Galaxia and thereby defeat Chaos. However, Usagi instead uses the kindness in her own heart to free Sailor Galaxia of Chaos's corruption, allowing Chaos to dissipate back into the entire universe, restoring the natural order. This also resurrects all of the fallen Sailor Guardians and any others whose Star Seeds were stolen. Normalcy is restored, and Usagi, once again acknowledging her destiny as the champion of justice, Sailor Moon, kisses Mamoru under the full moon.

== Production and broadcasting ==
Naoko Takeuchi initially planned both the Sailor Moon manga and anime to only run for one season. Due to the season's popularity, Toei Animation asked Takeuchi to continue drawing her manga, but she initially struggled with developing another storyline to extend the series. At the suggestion of her editor, Fumio Osano, Takeuchi decided that the second season would focus on introducing Sailor Moon's daughter from the future. To give Takeuchi time to write the Black Moon story arc, the anime team developed a filler arc known as Makai (Lit. Hell) Tree arc.

Sailor Moon is adapted from the 52 chapters of the series which was published in Nakayoshi from 1992 to 1997. The first season was directed by Junichi Satō with Kazuko Tadano as a character designer. For the second season, Sato directed the Makai Tree arc while Kunihiko Ikuhara directed the Black Moon arc. The third and fourth seasons were directed by Ikuhara, with Ikuko Itoh taking the role of character designer starting from the third season. The fifth and final season was directed by Takuya Igarashi, with Katsumi Tamegai as the character designer. The series premiered in Japan on TV Asahi on March 7, 1992, taking over the timeslot previously held by Goldfish Warning!, and ran for 200 episodes until its conclusion on February 8, 1997.

Because the manga was often published during the anime's production, the anime would only lag the manga by a month or two. As a result, "the anime follows the storyline of the manga fairly closely, although there are deviations." Takeuchi has stated that due to Toei's largely male production staff, she feels that the anime version has "a slight male perspective."

Sailor Moon consists of five separate seasons: Sailor Moon, Sailor Moon R, Sailor Moon S, Sailor Moon SuperS, and Sailor Moon Sailor Stars. The seasons each roughly correspond to one of the five major story arcs of the manga, following the same general storyline and including most of the same characters. Toei also developed five special animated shorts. The anime series was sold as 20 volumes in Japan. By the end of 1995, each volume had sold approximately 300,000 copies.

=== English dub production and broadcast ===
In 1995, after a bidding war with Toon Makers & Renaissance-Atlantic Entertainment, who wanted to produce an American live-action/animated hybrid adaptation, DIC Productions, L.P. (now Wildbrain), SeaGull Entertainment and Sachs Finley Media, licensed the first two seasons of Sailor Moon from Toei Animation for an English-language release in North America. The Mississauga-based Optimum Productions was hired to dub the anime. Bob Summers wrote a new background score. (Note: Sailor Moon end credits (DiC dub, 1995)) DIC had mandated cuts to content and length, which reduced the first 89 episodes by seven. (Note: Sailor Moon DIC/Optimum dub, episodes 1–82 (1–89 uncut)) Their adaptation was created to capitalize on the success of Mighty Morphin Power Rangers.

The series premiered in Canada on August 28, 1995, on YTV and in first-run syndication in the U.S. on September 11, but halted production in November 1995 after two seasons due to low ratings. Despite moderate success in Canada, the U.S. airing struggled in early morning "dead" timeslots; the series originally aired in the U.S. in morning and afternoon timeslots which Anne Allison describes as unsuitable for the target audience. In contrast, due to the dubbing process being done in Canada, the series was considered Canadian enough to be screened in primetime as local content. After the series was canceled, a fan petition that garnered over 12,500 signatures was created. It caught the attention of General Mills, who, in 1997, agreed to sponsor and syndicate the Sailor Moon dub through The Program Exchange. This was later considered an early example of successful fan activism. On June 9, 1997, re-runs of this canceled dub began airing on USA Network. That same year, production on the series' English dub was resumed with the last 17 episodes of the second season, Sailor Moon R, and was broadcast in Canada from September 20 to November 21, 1997, to wrap up lingering plot lines. On June 1, 1998, reruns of the series began airing on Cartoon Network's weekday afternoon programming block, Toonami. Due to the ratings success of these reruns, the remaining seventeen episodes (promoted as "The Lost Episodes") also began airing on November 30. In 1999, Cloverway Inc. once again contracted Optimum Productions to produce English-language adaptations of Sailor Moon S and SuperS with Pioneer Entertainment handling home video distribution. These dubs featured less censorship than their predecessors. Sailor Moon's North American broadcasting ended when the series was pulled from YTV in Canada on January 2, 2004.

Due to the series' resurgence of popularity in Japan, re-runs of the Sailor Moon series began on September 1, 2009, on Animax. In 2010, Toei negotiated to license and broadcast Sailor Moon in Italy on Mediaset, resulting in an international revival. Later, Toei licensed Sailor Moon episodes to countries which the show has not been aired before. On May 16, 2014, North American manga and anime distributor Viz Media announced that it had acquired the Sailor Moon anime series, as well as the three films and specials for an English-language release in North America, allowing Viz to restore the removed content from the first 89 episodes. The Studio City, Los Angeles-based Studiopolis was also hired by Viz to re-dub the entire series. The series began streaming in the United States on Neon Alley and Hulu on May 19, 2014.It was available with Japanese audio on Tubi TV between July 15, 2016 and November 8, 2023; and with English audio on Crave between September 18, 2020 and September 17, 2023. On November 28, 2014, Australian manga and anime publisher Madman Entertainment announced that they had re-acquired the rights to the "Sailor Moon" anime series for Australia & New Zealand and will release the series in uncut format with the Viz Media English adaptation in 2015. Madman had previously held the Australian license for Sailor Moon on VHS & DVD. On May 31, 2024, the Viz dub began airing on Adult Swim as part of the newly launched Toonami Rewind programming block, marking the first broadcast of Sailor Moon on American television after 23 years of absence, also showing episodes previously unaired in the country.

The Viz dub has not been made available to view on a FAST basis in Canada. Tubi's and Pluto TV's carriage of Sailor Moon in Canada has only provided audio in Japanese, and Crave is not a FAST service.

==== Editing and censorship ====
During the original North American airing, some bathing scenes involving brief nudity were censored by having traces of water that are originally transparent and therefore showing areas of characters' bodies that were judged to be unsuitable for viewing by children were reworked visually so that the transparency is absent and the water as such is visually without detail other than color.

Sailor Moon's original North American release was the subject of heavy editing which resulted in large amounts of removed content and alterations that greatly changed the original work. These changes altered almost every aspect of the show including character names, clothing, scenes and dialogue. Some scenes with brief nudity and bathing were also censored, and any type of violence including violence against children was also removed.

The series also faced censorship in various countries that ranged from changing a character's gender (e.g.: changing Zoisite and Fisheye from male to female) to removing gender fluidness in characters, or editing romantic pairings into close relationships between family members (e.g.: making Sailor Neptune and Sailor Uranus cousins). Sociology professor Rhea Hoskin specifies that the removal of homosexual and gender-fluid characters in the 1990s Sailor Moon highlights the exclusivity of what was otherwise representation of LGBTQ in a female-lead superhero show. Modern releases restore the censored material cut from the original Japanese version.

== Music ==
Takanori Arisawa composed the score for Pretty Soldier Sailor Moon. In 1998, 2000, and 2001 Arisawa won JASRAC International Awards for most international royalties, owing largely to the popularity of Sailor Moon music in other nations.

The first opening theme, Moonlight Densetsu (ムーンライト伝説, Mūnraito Densetsu; Lit. Moonlight Legend), was used for the first 166 episodes, being performed by DALI for the first two seasons and then by Moon Lips for the next two seasons. The second opening theme, for the remaining episodes, is "Sailor Star Song" performed by Kae Hanazawa. The last ending theme, used for the series finale at episode 200, is Moon Lips's version of "Moonlight Densetsu".

The DiC/Cloverway/Optimum English adaptation of the anime series used the melody of "Moonlight Densetsu" with very different English lyrics. At the time, it was unusual for anime theme songs to be translated, and this was one of the first such themes to be redone in English since Star Blazers. The English theme has been described as "inane but catchy". The Japanese theme is a love song based on the relationship between Usagi and Mamoru ("born on the same Earth"), whereas the English Sailor Moon theme resembles a superhero anthem.

"Moonlight Densetsu" was released as a CD single in March 1992, and was an "explosive hit." "Moonlight Densetsu" won first place in the Song category in Animage's 15th and 16th Anime Grand Prix. It came seventh in the 17th Grand Prix, and "Moon Revenge" from Sailor Moon R: The Movie, came eighth. "'Rashiku' Ikimasho", the second closing song for SuperS, placed eighteenth in 1996. In 1997, "Sailor Star Song", the new opening theme for Sailor Stars, came eleventh, and "Moonlight Densetsu" came sixteenth.

== Related media ==
=== Home releases ===
In Japan, Sailor Moon received VHS and LaserDisc releases during its run. The first LaserDisc volume was released on April 25, 1993 and the first VHS volume was released on July 25, 1993. Sailor Moon did not receive a DVD release until 2002. Mass-produced individual six-episode DVDs were released beginning on May 21, 2002. On January 25, 2017, the Blu-ray collection of the series was released from June 14 during the franchise's 25th anniversary as Pretty Guardian Sailor Moon, and each season consisted of 23 episodes per volume.

In 2014, Viz Media announced plans to release the series with a new English dub in both limited and standard edition DVD/Blu-ray Disc combo packs, as well as standard DVD releases, with the first part of season one released on November 11, 2014. The series was also released to streaming on Hulu and Neon Alley beginning with the first part of season one on September 5, 2014. The last part of the anime series, part two of Sailor Stars (season five), was released on November 12, 2019. Viz's original releases of the first three seasons were noted to have poor video quality. The series was re-released to Blu-ray Disc as complete season sets with improved picture quality beginning with the "Complete First Season" on June 14, 2022. A complete series box-set containing all 200 episodes, three films, five specials and five memorials, was set to be released in 2026.

=== Films ===
During the series' broadcast run, three theatrical animated Sailor Moon films were produced: Sailor Moon R: The Movie (1993), Sailor Moon S: The Movie (1994), and Sailor Moon SuperS: The Movie (1995). The films were released in December to line up with the winter vacations of Japanese schools. The films were typically double features paired up with other anime films, and were thus usually an hour or less in length. Each film features an original story that takes place during the season it is based on.

== Reception and legacy ==
Originally planned to run for only six months, the Sailor Moon anime continued due to its popularity, concluding after a five-year run. In Japan, it aired every Saturday night in prime time at 7 p.m.; its run there was very popular, with an average viewer rating of 11–12% for most of the series run. Commentators detect in the anime adaptation of Sailor Moon "a more shonen tone", appealing to a wider audience than the manga, which aimed squarely at teenage girls. The media franchise became one of the most successful Japan has ever had, reaching $1.5 billion in merchandise sales during the first three years. Ten years after the series completion, the series featured among the top thirty of TV Asahi's Top 100 anime polls in 2005 and 2006. The anime series won the Animage Anime Grand Prix prize in 1993. Sales of Sailor Moon fashion dolls overtook those of Licca-chan in the 1990s; Mattel attributed this to the "fashion-action" blend of the Sailor Moon storyline. Doll accessories included both fashion items and the Sailor Soldiers' weapons. The first season holds an approval rating of 90% on review aggregator Rotten Tomatoes, based on ten reviews. The site's consensus reads "Powerfully feminine and hypnotically cheesy, Sailor Moon's iconic anime still sparkles after all these years."

Sailor Moon has also become popular internationally. Spain and France became the first countries outside Japan to air Sailor Moon, beginning in December 1993. Other countries followed suit, including South Korea, the Philippines (Sailor Moon became one of ABC (now 5)'s main draws, helping it to become the third-biggest network in the country), Poland, Russia, Italy, the Czech Republic, Mexico, Guatemala, Brazil, Ukraine, Belarus, Sweden, Germany, Bulgaria, Austria, Indonesia, Croatia, Hungary, Taiwan, Thailand, Romania and Hong Kong, before North America picked up the franchise for adaptation. In 2001, the Sailor Moon manga was Tokyopop's best selling property, outselling the next-best selling titles by at least a factor of 1.5.

Sailor Moon sparked a highly successful merchandising campaign of over 5,000 items which contributed to demand internationally and translation into numerous languages. Sailor Moon has since become one of the most famous anime properties in the world. Due to its resurgence of popularity in Japan, the series was rebroadcast on September 1, 2009. The series also began rebroadcasting in Italy in autumn 2011, receiving permission from Naoko Takeuchi, who released new artwork to promote its return.

Critics have commended the anime series for its portrayal of strong female friendships as well as for its large cast of "strikingly different" characters who have different dimensions and aspects to them as the story continues and for an ability to appeal to a wide audience. Writer Nicolas Penedo attributes the success of Sailor Moon to its fusion of the shōjo manga genre of magical girls with the Saint Seiya fighting teams. According to Martha Cornog and Timothy Perper, Sailor Moon became popular because of its "strongly-plotted action with fight scenes, rescues" and its "emphasis on feelings and relationships", including the romance between Usagi and Mamoru. Usagi and Mamoru's romance has been seen as an archetype where the lovers "become more than the sum of their parts", promising to be together forever. In contrast, others see Sailor Moon as campy and melodramatic. Criticism has singled out its use of formulaic plots, monsters of the day and stock footage.

Screen Rant called the anime "partly revolutionary for how it depicted its heroines" as it featured women who were "distinct because of their personalities," while AfterEllen said that the anime "features the best-known yuri relationship in history" between Sailor Uranus and Sailor Neptune. Yuricon said that the relationship could be described as butch-femme and CBR called their relationship one of the most beloved, and complex, in the series.

Patrick Drazen states that Sailor Moon has two kinds of villains, the "monster of the day" and the "thinking, feeling humans." Although this is common in anime and manga, it is "almost unheard of in the West." Despite the series' apparent popularity among Western anime fandom, the dubbed version of the series received poor ratings in the United States when it was initially broadcast in syndication and did not do well in DVD sales in the United Kingdom. Anne Allison attributes the lack of popularity in the United States primarily to poor marketing (in the United States, the series was initially broadcast at times which did not suit the target audience – weekdays at 9:00 a. m. and 2:00 pm). Executives connected with Sailor Moon suggest that poor localization played a role. British authors Helen McCarthy and Jonathan Clements go further, calling the dub "indifferent" and suggesting that Sailor Moon was put in "dead" timeslots due to local interests. British distributor MVM Films attributed the low sales to the United Kingdom release being of the dub only, and that major retailers refused to support the show leading to the DVD release appealing to neither children nor older anime fans.

Due to anti-Japanese sentiment, most Japanese media other than anime was banned for several decades in South Korea. A producer in KBS "did not even try to buy" Sailor Moon because the producer thought it would not pass the censorship laws. However, by April 1997, Sailor Moon was airing on KBS 2 without issues and was "enormously" popular.
