= Sailor Moon R =

Second season of the Sailor Moon anime series

- Season 2
- The anime series logo, originally translated to Pretty Soldier Sailor Moon R, and later as Pretty Guardian Sailor Moon R.
- No. of episodes: 43

Release
- Original network: TV Asahi
- Original release: March 6, 1993 – March 12, 1994

Season chronology
- ← Previous; Season 1 Next → Sailor Moon S

The second season of the Sailor Moon anime series, Sailor Moon R, (Note: Originally released in Japan as Pretty Soldier Sailor Moon R (美少女戦士セーラームーンR, Bishōjo Senshi Sērā Mūn Āru), and later as Pretty Guardian Sailor Moon R.) (Note: According to the booklet from the Sailor Moon Memorial Song Box, the "R" in the title can be read as an initialism for the words "Romance", "Return" or "Rose".) was produced by Toei Animation and directed by Junichi Sato and Kunihiko Ikuhara. The season premiered on TV Asahi and its ANN affiliates on March 6, 1993, and concluded on March 12, 1994, lasting 43 episodes.

Sailor Moon R consists of two story arcs; the self-contained "Makai Tree" arc spans the first 13 episodes, while the following 29 episodes adapt the "Black Moon Clan" arc from the Sailor Moon manga series by Naoko Takeuchi. After defeating the Dark Kingdom, Usagi Tsukino and her fellow Sailor Guardians are living normal lives, but are called back into action after the Hell Tree aliens arrive to harvest energy from people. Afterwards, the Black Moon Clan arrives to steal energy at the Star Points of the future Crystal Tokyo, forcing the protagonists to confront them with Usagi's future daughter, Chibiusa. The season's popularity with audiences was assessed in a 1994 Animage poll of favorite episodes: "Protect Chibiusa! Clash of the 10 Warriors" came in eighth place. The following year, "The Final Battle Between Light and Darkness! Love Sworn to the Future" came in seventh place.

DIC Entertainment licensed Sailor Moon R for an English-language broadcast in North America, with dubbing services by Optimum Productions. The English dub aired on YTV in Canada from October 25 to November 28, 1995, and in first-run syndication in the United States. DIC initially canceled the series due to low ratings, but after fan outcry and reruns being picked up by General Mills's The Program Exchange, the remaining 17 episodes were dubbed and aired from October 4 to November 21, 1997, omitting one of total 43 episodes. Sailor Moon R was the final season licensed by DIC and the last to air in U.S. syndication; the next two seasons were licensed by Cloverway Inc. and broadcast on Cartoon Network's Toonami programming block. In 2014, Viz Media licensed Sailor Moon for an updated English release produced by Studiopolis. Their re-dub of Sailor Moon R was released in two DVD and Blu-ray box sets on July 14 and October 27, 2015.

This season uses two pieces of theme music: an opening theme and ending theme. The opening theme, "Moonlight Densetsu", is performed by the idol group DALI. The ending theme "Otome no Policy" is performed by Yoko Ishida. DIC Entertainment continued to use their English-language version of "Moonlight Densetsu" for their dub.

== Episodes ==
Orig.	DiC	No. in season	DiC title Original Japanese and Viz titles	Directed by	Written by	Art director(s)	Animation director(s)	Original release date	English air date
47	41	1	"The Return of Sailor Moon" "Moon Returns: The Mysterious Aliens Appear"; Transliteration: "Mūn fukkatsu! Nazo no eirian shutsugen" (Japanese: ムーン復活!謎のエイリアン出現)	Kazuhisa Takenouchi	Shigeru Yanagawa	Yoshiyuki Shikano	Taichi Nakamura	March 6, 1993	November 10, 1995
Following the defeat of the Dark Kingdom, Usagi and her friends live happy but separate lives as the result of having their memories altered to not remember being Sailor Guardians. But the presence of two aliens called Ail and Ann, who assumed the identities of siblings Seijuro and Natsumi Ginga and are gathering life energy from humans, forces Luna to restore Usagi's memories and ability to transform into Sailor Moon.
48	42	2	"So You Want to Be in Pictures" "For Love and for Justice: Sailor Guardians Once Again"; Transliteration: "Ai to seigi yue! Sērā Senshi futatabi" (Japanese: 愛と正義ゆえ!セーラー戦士再び)	Yūji Endō	Katsuyuki Sumisawa	Minoru Ōkōchi	Shinya Hasegawa	March 13, 1993	November 13, 1995
Ami, Rei, Makoto, and Minako meet by chance during a casting call for a potential movie role. Ail and An send a Cardian monster to steal their energy, forcing Luna to reawaken their former memories as Sailor Guardians to help Sailor Moon fight it off. Usagi tries using the Moon Stick, but discovers it is gone after Dark Kingdom's defeat. The reawakened Sailor Guardians defeat the Cardian and celebrate being back together.
49	43	3	"A Knight to Remember" "For Whom is the White Rose? The Moonlight Knight Appears"; Transliteration: "Shiroi bara wa dare ni? Tsukikage no Naito tōjō" (Japanese: 白いバラは誰に?月影の騎士登場)	Harume Kosaka	Sukehiro Tomita	Kenichi Tajiri	Masahiro Andō	March 20, 1993	November 14, 1995
Makoto becomes distraught when a Cardian targets her friend Shinozaki and she must fight to protect him, despite feeling weak from donating blood to save his life. Meanwhile, Usagi attempts to rekindle her relationship with Mamoru, only to find out his memories of her are also altered. A mysterious new ally resembling Tuxedo Mask appears, calling himself the Moonlight Knight.
50	44	4	"VR Madness" "Usagi's Crisis: The Tiara Stops Working"; Transliteration: "Usagi no kiki! Tiara sadō sezu" (Japanese: うさぎの危機!ティアラ作動せず)	Takao Yoshizawa	Megumi Sugihara	Kazuyuki Hashimoto	Katsumi Tamegai	April 10, 1993	November 15, 1995
Usagi goes with her younger brother Shingo, their father Kenji, and Mamoru to a virtual-reality arcade which another Cardian attacks. But Sailor Moon is trying to use Moon Tiara Action on a Cardian, but it fails. Usagi's Sailor powers begin to wane in the midst of the battle, preventing her from defeating the enemy. The Moonlight Knight appears again, although he is revealed to not be Mamoru. Once again, the Sailor Guardians defeat the Cardian and Usagi is left despondent over her weakened state and the Moonlight Knight not being Mamoru.
51	45	5	"Cherry Blossom Time" "A New Transformation: Usagi's Power-Up"; Transliteration: "Atarashiki henshin! Usagi pawā appu" (Japanese: 新しき変身!うさぎパワーアップ)	Kunihiko Ikuhara	Shigeru Yanagawa	Yoshiyuki Shikano	Hisashi Kagawa	April 17, 1993	November 16, 1995
During a cherry blossom viewing, another Cardian attacks. Once again, Sailor Moon attempts to use use Moon Tiara Action again, but it fails. The Cardian shatters Usagi's transformation brooch, rendering Usagi powerless; the other Sailor Soldiers are incapacitated. All seems lost until Queen Serenity appears and fuses the Silver Crystal into Usagi's shattered brooch, giving her the Crystal Star Compact. Usagi's powers are restored by saying Moon Crystal Power, Make Up and she is given a new stronger wand known as the Cutie Moon Rod, which activates the Moon Princess Halation attack.
52	46	6	"Kindergarten Chaos" "The Targeted Kindergarteners: Venus to the Rescue"; Transliteration: "Nerawareta enji! Vīnasu daikatsuyaku" (Japanese: 狙われた園児!ヴィーナス大活躍)	Takuya Igarashi	Katsuyuki Sumisawa	Minoru Ōkōchi	Taichi Nakamura	April 24, 1993	November 17, 1995
Minako becomes entangled with a kindergarten student who hero-worships Sailor Moon, just as the aliens choose to target younger victims for their energy. Sailor Venus becomes much stronger, and gains a new attack called Crescent Beam Shower that destroys the enemy in a shower of yellow light.
53	47	7	"Much Ado About Babysitting" "Mamoru and Usagi's Babysitting Mayhem"; Transliteration: "Mamoru to Usagi no bebīshittā sōdō" (Japanese: 衛とうさぎのベビーシッター騒動)	Yūji Endō	Sukehiro Tomita	Kenichi Tajiri	Kazuko Tadano	May 1, 1993	November 20, 1995
When a Cardian attacks a nursery, Usagi and Mamoru have to watch over a baby boy together, even though Mamoru still does not remember their previous strong and close romantic love connection. Sailor Mercury gains a new and much stronger attack, Bubble Spray Freezing, that can freeze enemies in solid ice.
54	48	8	"Raye's Day in the Spotlight" "The School Festival is for Me?! Queen Rei's Song"; Transliteration: "Bunkasai wa watashi no tame?! Rei joō nesshō" (Japanese: 文化祭は私のため?!レイ女王熱唱)	Harume Kosaka	Katsuyuki Sumisawa	Kazuyuki Hashimoto	Masahiro Andō	May 8, 1993	November 21, 1995
Rei goes into song-writing for a festival at her school. Ail and An target the event and find themselves unwittingly becoming part of the festivities. Sailor Mars gains a new and much stronger fire/flame-based attack Fire Soul Bird that is a massive fireball in the shape of a phoenix.
55	49	9	"Food Fetish" "Is Seijuro the Moonlight Knight? Mako on Fire"; Transliteration: "Tsukikage wa Seijūrō? Moeru Mako-chan" (Japanese: 月影は星十郎?もえるまこちゃん)	Kazuhisa Takenouchi	Megumi Sugihara	Yoshiyuki Shikano	Ikuko Ito	May 22, 1993	November 22, 1995
Makoto tries to reach out towards Ail, her latest crush, with a bentō of love, but merely ends up getting An riled and ready to strike back. Sailor Jupiter becomes much stronger and develops a new more powerful lightning-based attack, Supreme Thunder Dragon.
56	50	10	"Mirror, Mirror on the Wall" "Steal a Kiss from Mamoru! An's Project Snow White"; Transliteration: "Mamoru no kisu ubae! An no Shirayuki-hime sakusen" (Japanese: 衛のキス奪え!アンの白雪姫作戦)	Noriyo Sasaki	Sukehiro Tomita	Minoru Ōkōchi	Shinya Hasegawa	May 29, 1993	November 23, 1995
Mamoru's college friends put on a production of Snow White, but all the others pull out, so Usagi and friends volunteer. An rigs a straw lot to be sure she gets the part of Snow White alongside Mamoru's "Prince" role, while Usagi is cast as the Evil Queen. Ail becomes jealous and attacks the production with a Cardian. Improvising, the Sailor Soldiers save the production by putting on a show while simultaneously defeating the Cardian.
57	51	11	"Detention Doldrums" "After School Trouble: Usagi is a Target"; Transliteration: "Hōkago ni goyōjin! Nerawareta Usagi" (Japanese: 放課後にご用心!狙われたうさぎ)	Yūji Endō	Katsuyuki Sumisawa	Kenichi Tajiri	Taichi Nakamura	June 5, 1993	November 4, 1995
Usagi and An find themselves stuck in detention together after Usagi is caught eating in class and An mouths off to Ms. Haruna. An gradually resolves to reach out and steal Usagi's energy for survival, just as Ail fights the Guardians with another Cardian that is disobeying orders.
58	52	12	"Secret Garden (Part 1 of 2)" "Disconnecting Love: The Raging Makai Tree"; Transliteration: "Surechigau ai no kokoro! Ikari no Makaiju" (Japanese: すれちがう愛の心!怒りの魔界樹)	Takao Yoshizawa	Shigeru Yanagawa	Kazuyuki Hashimoto	Kazuko Tadano	June 12, 1993	November 27, 1995
Ail and An begin to feel emotions they have never felt before when they find that the Hell Tree is withering to death. However, Usagi discovers the Tree when she opens a door. The Sailor Soldiers try to destroy the tree to no avail, trapping Usagi and Mamoru in the Hell Tree.
59	53	13	"Treed (Part 2 of 2)" "True Love Awakens: The Makai Tree's Secret"; Transliteration: "Mezameru shinjitsu no ai! Makaiju no himitsu" (Japanese: めざめる真実の愛!魔界樹の秘密)	Kazuhisa Takenouchi	Shigeru Yanagawa	Yoshiyuki Shikano	Katsumi Tamegai	June 19, 1993	November 28, 1995
The Hell Tree reveals its history and purpose; it used to thrive on love rather than stolen life energy. Sailor Moon heals and cleanses the Tree with her Cutie Moon Rod, turning it into a sapling. The Moonlight Knight reveals himself as an embodiment of Mamoru's subconscious, fading back into Mamoru's body with his memories restored. An is revived with her and Ail taking the sapling to a new planet to raise under their love. Note: This is the last episode with Junichi Sato as showrunner.
60	54	14	"Serena Times Two" "Angel or Devil? The Mysterious Girl from the Sky"; Transliteration: "Tenshi? Akuma? Sora kara kita nazo no shōjo" (Japanese: 天使?悪魔?空からきた謎の少女)	Kunihiko Ikuhara	Sukehiro Tomita	Minoru Ōkōchi	Masahiro Andō	June 26, 1993	October 25, 1995
As Mamoru and Usagi lean in for a romantic kiss, a small girl with bright pink hair falls out of the sky and lands on Usagi, kissing accidentally Mamoru and demanding the Legendary Silver Crystal from Usagi. The girl, also named Usagi Tsukino, quickly gets nicknamed "Chibiusa." Usagi starts to become suspicious when she returns home, and her family identifies Chibiusa as her cousin. Meanwhile, a new enemy, the Black Moon Clan, comes to Tokyo looking for Chibiusa.
61	55	15	"The Cosmetic Caper" "Usagi Devastated: Mamoru Declares a Break-Up"; Transliteration: "Usagi daishokku! Mamoru no zekkō sengen" (Japanese: うさぎ大ショック!衛の絶交宣言)	Kōnosuke Uda	Sukehiro Tomita	Kenichi Tajiri	Masahide Yanagisawa	July 3, 1993	October 26, 1995
Mamoru touchs Chibiusa and begins to have strange nightmares warning him to avoid Usagi at all costs that he is forced to break up with her, just as the Black Moon starts planning an operation to steal energy at the Crystal Points of the future Crystal Tokyo.
62	56	16	"Sailor Mercury Moving On?" "A Guardian's Friendship: Goodbye, Ami"; Transliteration: "Senshi no yūjō! Sayonara Ami-chan" (Japanese: 戦士の友情!さよなら亜美ちゃん)	Harume Kosaka	Katsuyuki Sumisawa	Kazuyuki Hashimoto	Taichi Nakamura	July 10, 1993	October 27, 1995
Ami receives an invitation to study abroad in Germany, and she accepts the offer. But in the end she decides not to go so she can save her friends from a Droid who can control ice. The Guardians also receive new transformation devices and new and much stronger Sailor abilities and attacks.
63	57	17	"Gramps in a Pickle" "Women Must Be Strong and Beautiful: Rei's New Special Technique"; Transliteration: "Onna wa tsuyoku utsukushiku! Rei no shin hissatsu waza" (Japanese: 女は強く美しく!レイの新必殺技)	Yūji Endō	Shigeru Yanagawa	Yoshiyuki Shikano	Shinya Hasegawa	July 24, 1993	October 30, 1995
Rei's grandfather tries to attract more girls to the shrine, but Koan, one of Black Moon's Specter Sisters, targets it in its role as a Crystal Point.
64	58	18	"Trouble Comes Thundering Down" "In Search of the Silver Crystal: Chibi-Usa's Secret"; Transliteration: "Ginzuishou wo motomete! Chibiusa no himitsu" (Japanese: 銀水晶を求めて!ちびうさの秘密)	Takao Yoshizawa	Sukehiro Tomita	Minoru Ōkōchi	Kazuko Tadano	July 31, 1993	October 31, 1995
Continuing her search for the Silver Crystal in the midst of a Droid attack, a saddened Chibiusa accidentally causes a gravitational disturbance with her great magical strength and power.
65	59	19	"A Charmed Life" "Dispute Over Love: Minako and Makoto's Conflict"; Transliteration: "Koi no ronsō! Minako to Makoto ga tairitsu" (Japanese: 恋の論争!美奈子とまことが対立)	Takuya Igarashi	Megumi Sugihara	Yoshiyuki Shikano	Masahiro Andō	August 14, 1993	November 1, 1995
Makoto and Minako get into a fight that nearly breaks their friendship, but an encounter with Calaveras and Petz (who run a charm-shop near a new Crystal Point) helps them work together to defeat the Specter Sisters and make amends.
66	60	20	"A Curried Favor" "Usagi's Parental Love: The Curry Romance Triangle"; Transliteration: "Usagi no oyagokoro!? Karē na sankaku kankei" (Japanese: うさぎの親心?カレーな三角関係)	Harume Kosaka	Shigeru Yanagawa	Kazuyuki Hashimoto	Katsumi Tamegai	August 21, 1993	November 2, 1995
Usagi tries to make curry for Chibiusa and Mamoru, but Calaveras and Petz target the supermarket.
67	—	21	"The Beach, the Island and a Vacation: The Guardians' Break"; Transliteration: "Umi yo, Shima yo, Bakansu yo! Senshi no kyūsoku" (Japanese: 海よ島よバカンスよ!戦士の休息)	Yūji Endō	Katsuyuki Sumisawa	Yoshiyuki Shikano	Taichi Nakamura	August 28, 1993	—
The Sailor Guardians go on vacation to the beach and end up looking for Chibiusa, who has found a baby plesiosaur on a volcanic island on the verge of erupting.
68	61	22	"Naughty 'N' Nice" "Protect Chibi-Usa: Clash of the Ten Warriors"; Transliteration: "Chibiusa wo mamore! Jū senshi no daigekisen" (Japanese: ちびうさを守れ!10戦士の大激戦)	Kunihiko Ikuhara	Sukehiro Tomita	Minoru Ōkōchi	Ikuko Ito	September 11, 1993	November 3, 1995
Chibiusa tries to go back to the future because she feels that she does not belong in the present, but Koan and Berthier surprise and attack her. She manages to escape, but later the four Specter Sisters and their leader Rubeus battle against Sailor Moon and the other Sailor Guardians, who try to protect Chibiusa.
69	62	23	"Prediction of Doom" "Awaken the Sleeping Beauty: Mamoru's Distress"; Transliteration: "Mezame yo nemureru bishōjo! Mamoru no kunō" (Japanese: 目覚めよ眠れる美少女!衛の苦悩)	Takao Yoshizawa	Sukehiro Tomita	Yoshiyuki Shikano	Kazuko Tadano	September 25, 1993	November 6, 1995
Mamoru continues to have prophetic nightmares about Usagi and questions the voice telling him to stay away from her. Meanwhile, the Black Moon once again attacks Chibiusa. The Sailor Guardians save her, but a droid puts Sailor Moon into a deep sleep, causing her to dream of Mamoru. Out of fear of losing Usagi, Mamoru rushes to her side as Tuxedo Mask and kisses Sailor Moon passionately, awakening her. Despite this, he still remains distant to her afterwards.
70	63	24	"Enemies No More" "Battle of the Flames of Love! Mars vs. Koan"; Transliteration: "Ai no honō no taiketsu! Māzu tai Kōan" (Japanese: 愛の炎の対決!マーズVSコーアン)	Kōnosuke Uda	Katsuyuki Sumisawa	Minoru Ōkōchi	Hisashi Kagawa	October 2, 1993	November 7, 1995
Koan intends on capturing Chibiusa at the Hikawa Shrine to try and win Rubeus's romantic love. However, Rubeus rejects Koan, which prompts Sailor Mars and Yuichiro Kumada to show her the true meaning of true love and friendship.
71	64	25	"Checkmate" "For Friendship! Ami vs. Berthier"; Transliteration: "Yūjō no tame! Ami to Beruche gekitotsu" (Japanese: 友情のため!亜美とベルチェ激突)	Harume Kosaka	Shigeru Yanagawa	Kenichi Tajiri	Masahiro Andō	October 16, 1993	November 8, 1995
Berthier challenges Sailor Mercury to a game of chess so she can get revenge on her, and ends up discovering the powerful force of true love and friendship.
72	65	26	"Sibling Rivalry" "Rubeus the Heartless: The Tragic Sisters"; Transliteration: "Hijō no Rubeusu! Kanashimi no yon shimai" (Japanese: 非情のルベウス!悲しみの四姉妹)	Noriyo Sasaki	Megumi Sugihara	Kazuyuki Hashimoto	Katsumi Tamegai	October 30, 1993	November 9, 1995
Rubeus tries destroying the Sailor Guardians once and for all by giving the "Black Moon Stick" to the remaining Specter Sisters so they can kill them. In the midst, however, Chibiusa accidentally sees the girls transform, revealing their identities as the Sailor Guardians, and that Usagi, as Sailor Moon, holds the Silver Crystal inside the brooch.
73	66	27	"Rubeus Evens the Score (Part 1 of 2)" "A UFO Appears: The Sailor Guardians Abducted"; Transliteration: "Yūfō shutsugen! Sarawareta Sērā Senshi-tachi" (Japanese: UFO出現!さらわれたセーラー戦士たち)	Yūji Endō	Katsuyuki Sumisawa	Yoshiyuki Shikano	Taichi Nakamura	November 6, 1993	September 20, 1997
Chibiusa, saddened and confused that Usagi is the Legendary Sailor Moon, steals the Silver Crystal and tries to go back to the future. Meanwhile, Esmeraude visits Rubeus and warns him of his replacement if he does not dispose of the Sailor Guardians. Due to Chibiusa's meddling, Rubeus succeeds in capturing the other Guardians. Note: This was the first of 17 episodes of Sailor Moon to be syndicated by General Mills along with Seagull Entertainment in the United States.
74	67	28	"Rubeus Strikes Back (Part 2 of 2)" "Defeat Rubeus: The Battle in Space"; Transliteration: "Rubeusu wo taose! Uchūkūkan no kessen" (Japanese: ルベウスを倒せ!宇宙空間の決戦)	Hiroki Shibata	Katsuyuki Sumisawa	Kenichi Tajiri	Katsumi Tamegai	November 13, 1993	September 27, 1997
Usagi reluctantly pursues Rubeus, who captures her and Chibiusa onboard his spaceship. There, she and Chibiusa must work together in their final battle against Rubeus in the space to rescue the other Guardians. The Sailor Guardians and Chibiusa flee Rubeus' exploding spaceship and Rubeus is left to die by Esmeraude.
75	68	29	"The Secret of the Luna Sphere" "The Mysterious New Guardian: Sailor Pluto Appears"; Transliteration: "Nazo no shin Senshi, Sērā Purūtō tōjō" (Japanese: 謎の新戦士, セーラープルート登場)	Takuya Igarashi	Shigeru Yanagawa	Yoshiyuki Shikano	Masahiro Andō	November 20, 1993	October 4, 1997
Chibiusa falls ill, and Sailor Pluto, the lonely Sailor Guardian of Space-Time and the Outer Solar System, reveals herself to the Usagi and the Inner Sailor Guardians to help Chibiusa.
76	69	30	"Emerald Takes Over" "Magic of Darkness: Esmeraude's Invasion"; Transliteration: "Ankoku no maryoku! Esmerōdo no shinryaku" (Japanese: 暗黒の魔力!エスメロードの侵略)	Tsunekiyo Otani	Megumi Sugihara	Kazuyuki Hashimoto	Taichi Nakamura	December 4, 1993	October 11, 1997
After Rubeus's death, Esmeraude begins a new assault on Tokyo, targeting the grand opening of a pastry shop which the Guardians check out.
77	70	31	"Promises Fulfilled" "Shared Feelings: Usagi and Mamoru in Love Once Again"; Transliteration: "Omoi wa onaji! Usagi to Mamoru no ai futatabi" (Japanese: 想いは同じ!うさぎと衛の愛再び)	Harume Kosaka	Sukehiro Tomita	Yoshiyuki Shikano	Hideyuki Motohashi	December 11, 1993	October 18, 1997
Desperately wanting to be with Mamoru once and for all, Usagi takes a craft-session for a special promise ring bracelet. But the bracelet turns out to be a life energy-siphoning monster for the Droid. Usagi dreams of their wedding day and has the same nightmare as Mamoru's, prompting her to ask Mamoru about it. Questioning the meaning of their dreams, Mamoru continues to believe that being together will bring harm to Usagi and the world. Ultimately, the couple defy their nightmares to be together again for good.
78	71	32	"No Thanks, Nurse Venus!" "Venus Minako's Nurse Mayhem"; Transliteration: "Vīnasu Minako no nāsu daisōdō" (Japanese: ヴィーナス美奈子のナース大騒動)	Noriyo Sasaki	Katsuyuki Sumisawa	Kenichi Tajiri	Masahiro Andō	December 18, 1993	October 25, 1997
With nearly all of the Sailor Guardians bedridden due to a virus (created by Esmeraude to incapacitate them), Minako decides to play nursemaid to help them out, causing one disaster after another from her "good" intentions.
79	72	33	"Dog Day for Artemis" "Artemis' Adventure: The Monster Animal Kingdom"; Transliteration: "Arutemisu no bōken! Ma no dōbutsu ōkoku" (Japanese: アルテミスの冒険!魔の動物王国)	Yūji Endō	Shigeru Yanagawa	Yoshiyuki Shikano	Katsumi Tamegai	December 25, 1993	November 1, 1997
After getting sick of Luna's chiding, Artemis runs away to an animal shelter controlled by Esmeraude's Droid.
80	73	34	"Smart Payoff" "The Terrifying Illusion: Ami All Alone"; Transliteration: "Kyōfu no gen'ei! Hitoribocchi no Ami" (Japanese: 恐怖の幻影!ひとりぼっちの亜美)	Hiroki Shibata	Sukehiro Tomita	Kazuyuki Hashimoto	Hideyuki Motohashi	January 8, 1994	November 7, 1997
Esmeraude's Droid targets Sailor Mercury, using her feelings of doubt to try to make her turn against her four best friends.
81	74	35	"Child's Play" "The Dark Gate is Completed? The Targeted Elementary School"; Transliteration: "Ankoku gēto kansei? Nerawareta shōgakkō" (Japanese: 暗黒ゲート完成?狙われた小学校)	Kōnosuke Uda	Shigeru Yanagawa	Kazuhisa Asai	Taichi Nakamura	January 15, 1994	November 11, 1997
The Boule Brothers Chiral and Achiral target Chibiusa's school, forcing Chibiusa to witness her friends and classmates turn against her, including her best friend Momoko Momohara. After Usagi and the others assist in saving them, Chibiusa finally decides to return to the future to face her problems head-on.
82	75	36	"Future Shocked" "Journey to the Future: Battle in the Space-Time Corridor"; Transliteration: "Mirai he no tabidachi! Jikū kairō no tatakai" (Japanese: 未来への旅立ち!時空回廊の戦い)	Harume Kosaka	Katsuyuki Sumisawa	Kenichi Tajiri	Hideyuki Motohashi	January 22, 1994	November 12, 1997
Sailor Moon, Tuxedo Mask and the rest of the Sailor Guardians with Chibiusa travel to the future and encounter Sailor Pluto once again. She opens the Gates of Time via her Garnet Rod, and once in the Space-Time Corridor, they find out that Esmeraude has planned a trap for them. Esmeraude sends a final Droid Ryuakusu after the team and demands her to bring back Chibiusa and purposely forgets to tell her to bring back Sailor Moon—leaving Ryuakusu to kill Sailor Moon but after a full-blown battle the Sailor Guardians defeat Ryuakusu with the Sailor Planet attack and enter the gate of the future.
83	76	37	"The Legend of Black Moon" "The Shocking Future: Demande's Dark Ambition"; Transliteration: "Shōgeki no mirai! Demando no kuroki yabō" (Japanese: 衝撃の未来!デマンドの黒き野望)	Noriyo Sasaki	Sukehiro Tomita	Yoshiyuki Shikano	Masahiro Andō	January 29, 1994	November 13, 1997
When the Sailor Guardians and Tuxedo Mask arrive in the future, they see that Crystal Tokyo looks like a ghost town. They encounter King Endymion, who is revealed to be Tuxedo Mask's future self, and tells them the legend of the Black Moon Clan, and reveals Chibiusa as the daughter of Sailor Moon and Tuxedo Mask in the future of Crystal Tokyo. Meanwhile, the Black Moon Clan's leader Prince Demande kidnaps Sailor Moon due to her great resemblance to the beautiful Neo-Queen Serenity, Sailor Moon's future self.
84	77	38	"Jealousy's Just Reward" "Wiseman's Evil Hand: Chibi-Usa Disappears"; Transliteration: "Waizuman no mashu! Chibiusa shōmetsu" (Japanese: ワイズマンの魔手!ちびうさ消滅)	Yūji Endō	Megumi Sugihara	Kazuyuki Hashimoto	Katsumi Tamegai	February 5, 1994	November 14, 1997
Wiseman kidnaps Chibiusa from the Crystal Palace and fills her mind with false thoughts that no one cares for or loves her. Meanwhile, he uses Esmeraude, who has gone to him in order to make her Prince Demande's queen. Wiseman tricks her, giving her a false crown, which transforms her into a huge dragon, to distract Sailor Moon from his real purpose. In the end the Sailor Guardians and Tuxedo Mask unleash attacks on the apparently invincible dragon—still not recognizing it as Esmeraude in disguise, and then Sailor Moon unleashes Moon Princess Halation. The dragon disintegrates and becomes Esmeraude, seemingly asleep. Esmeraude vanishes into a vortex, ending her life. Wiseman laughs and reflects on his gladness at her departure, and then reveals that Demande and his brother Saphir will be "joining" Esmeraude. An eerily familiar laugh echoes around the room.
85	78	39	"The Birth of Wicked Lady" "The Dark Queen: Birth of Black Lady"; Transliteration: "Ankoku no joō, Burakku Redi no tanjō" (Japanese: 暗黒の女王, ブラックレディの誕生)	Hiroki Shibata	Sukehiro Tomita	Kenichi Tajiri	Hisashi Kagawa	February 12, 1994	November 17, 1997
Wiseman continues brainwashing Chibiusa and tells her lies about her family and friends. He then uses his evil magic to the make her older, creating her darker alter-ego, Black Lady, and then uses her to open a Dark Portal in present-day Tokyo.
86	79	40	"Brotherly Love" "Saphir Dies: Wiseman's Trap"; Transliteration: "Safīru zetsumei! Waizuman no wana" (Japanese: サフィール絶命!ワイズマンの罠)	Kōnosuke Uda	Katsuyuki Sumisawa	Kenichi Tajiri	Shinya Hasegawa	February 19, 1994	November 18, 1997
Saphir discovers the truth regarding Wiseman's ultimate plan, forcing him to escape to the past where the four former Specter Sisters (whom Sailor Moon had healed with the Silver Crystal) discover him. But Wiseman tracks him down and kills him before he can warn his older brother of the true evil.
87	80	41	"Diamond in the Rough" "Believing in Love and the Future: Usagi's Decision"; Transliteration: "Ai to mirai wo shinjite! Usagi no kesshin" (Japanese: 愛と未来を信じて!うさぎの決心)	Harume Kosaka	Sukehiro Tomita	Kazuhisa Asai	Taichi Nakamura	February 26, 1994	November 19, 1997
The Sailor Guardians enter the growing Black Crystal to stop Wiseman, but Prince Demande abducts Sailor Moon once again. After finally helping him realize what is really going on, Demande ultimately sacrifices himself to allow her to save both the present and future at all cost.
88	81	42	"The Final Battle" "The Final Battle Between Light and Dark: Pledge of Love to the Future"; Transliteration: "Hikari to yami no saishū kessen! Mirai he chikau ai" (Japanese: 光と闇の最終決戦!未来へ誓う愛)	Takuya Igarashi	Sukehiro Tomita	Kazuyuki Hashimoto	Kazuko Tadano	March 5, 1994	November 20, 1997
The Sailor Guardians and Tuxedo Mask attempt to enter the Black Gate, but Black Lady appears and attacks them. Sailor Moon tries to use the enormous energy power of the Silver Crystal to transform into Neo Queen Serenity and show Black Lady her true memories. After a while, Black Lady turns back into Chibiusa. Then, Wiseman reveals himself as Death Phantom and proceeds to open the Black Gate to attack the Earth, forcing Sailor Moon in her Neo Queen Serenity form to fight. Chibiusa cries and her tear forms the Silver Crystal of the future. Together, Neo Queen Serenity and Chibiusa overpower the Death Phantom, destroying him and the Black Crystal for good. Later, Chibiusa returns to the peaceful future of Crystal Tokyo and is finally reunited with her mother, her father and the future Sailor Guardians.
89	82	43	"Follow the Leader" "Usagi and the Girls' Resolve: Prelude to a New Battle"; Transliteration: "Usagi-tachi no ketsui! Atarashiki tatakai no jokyoku" (Japanese: うさぎ達の決意!新しき戦いの序曲)	Kōnosuke Uda	Katsuyuki Sumisawa	—	—	March 12, 1994	November 21, 1997
A recap of the two previous seasons as well as a preview for the third season, Sailor Moon S. During the voice-overs, the Sailor Guardians argue over who will become the new main character. Note: This was the last episode to be produced by DiC and syndicated by General Mills along with Seagull Entertainment in the United States.

== Home media ==
=== Japanese ===
==== VHS ====
Toei Video (Japan, VHS)
Volume		Episodes	Release date	Ref.
美少女戦士セーラームーンR	1	47–50	July 21, 1994	
美少女戦士セーラームーンR	2	51–54	August 21, 1994	
美少女戦士セーラームーンR	3	55–58	September 21, 1994	
美少女戦士セーラームーンR	4	59–62	October 21, 1994	
美少女戦士セーラームーンR	5	63–66	November 21, 1994	
美少女戦士セーラームーンR	6	67–70	December 9, 1994	
美少女戦士セーラームーンR	7	71–74	January 25, 1995	
美少女戦士セーラームーンR	8	75–78	February 25, 1995	
美少女戦士セーラームーンR	9	79–82	March 21, 1995	
美少女戦士セーラームーンR	10	83–85	April 21, 1995	
美少女戦士セーラームーンR	11	86–89	May 21, 1995	

==== DVD ====
Toei Video (Japan, Region 2 DVD)
Volume		Episodes	Release date	Ref.
美少女戦士セーラームーンR	1	47–52	September 21, 2004	
美少女戦士セーラームーンR	2	53–58	September 21, 2004	
美少女戦士セーラームーンR	3	59–64	October 21, 2004	
美少女戦士セーラームーンR	4	65–69	October 21, 2004	
美少女戦士セーラームーンR	5	70–74	November 21, 2004	
美少女戦士セーラームーンR	6	75–79	November 21, 2004	
美少女戦士セーラームーンR	7	80–84	December 10, 2004	
美少女戦士セーラームーンR	8	85–89	December 10, 2004	
美少女戦士セーラームーンR DVD COLLECTION	1	47–69	March 21, 2010	
美少女戦士セーラームーンR DVD COLLECTION	2	70–89	April 21, 2010	

==== Blu-ray ====
Toei Video (Japan, Region A)
Volume	Episodes	Release date	Ref.
美少女戦士セーラームーンR Blu-ray COLLECTION VOL.1	47–68	October 4, 2017	
美少女戦士セーラームーンR Blu-ray COLLECTION VOL.2	69–89	December 6, 2017	

=== English ===
==== VHS ====
===== United States =====
Buena Vista Home Video/DIC Toon-Time Video
Volume		Episodes	Release date	Ref.
Sailor Moon: The Doom Tree Series	1	47–50 (41–44 edited)	April 22, 1997	
Sailor Moon: The Doom Tree Series	2	51–53 (45–47 edited)	April 22, 1997	
Sailor Moon: The Doom Tree Series	3	54–56 (48–50 edited)	April 22, 1997	
Sailor Moon: The Doom Tree Series	4	57–59 (51–53 edited)	April 22, 1997	

ADV Films
Volume	Episodes	Release date	Ref.
Volume 11: The Return of Sailor Moon	47–50 (41–44 edited)	September 11, 2001	
Volume 12: Tree of Doom!	51–54 (45–48 edited)	September 11, 2001	
Volume 13: Moonlight Knight and the Garden of Evil	55–58 (49–52 edited)	November 13, 2001	
Volume 14: Big Changes!	59–62 (53–56 edited)	November 13, 2001	
Volume 15: Invaders from the Future	63–66 (57–60 edited)	January 29, 2002	
Volume 16: By the Light of the Negamoon	68–71 (61–64 edited)	January 29, 2002	
Volume 17: Crystal Matrix	72–75 (65–68 edited)	February 19, 2002	
Volume 18: Looking for Trouble	76–79 (69–72 edited)	February 19, 2002	
Volume 19: Time Travelers!	80–84 (73–77 edited)	March 13, 2002	
Volume 20: Love Conquers All!	85–89 (78–82 edited)	March 13, 2002	

==== DVD ====
===== United States =====
ADV Films (Region 1)
Volume	Episodes	Release date	Ref.
The Doom Tree Strikes!	49–54 (43–48 edited)	September 3, 2002	
The Return of the Doom Tree	55–60 (49–54 edited)	October 15, 2002	
The Trouble with Rini	61–66 (55–60 edited)	October 15, 2002	
The Ties that Bind	68–73 (61–66 edited)	November 26, 2002	
The Wrath of the Emerald	74–79 (67–72 edited)	November 26, 2002	
Time Travelers!	80–84 (73–77 edited)	January 7, 2003	
Love Conquers All!	85–89 (78–82 edited)	January 7, 2003	
Season Two – Uncut	47–66, 68–89	September 16, 2003	

Viz Media (Region 1)
Volume	Episodes	Release date	Ref.
Season 2 Part 1	47–68	July 14, 2015	
Season 2 Part 2	69–89	October 27, 2015	

===== United Kingdom =====
MVM Films (Region 2)
Volume	Episodes	Release date	Ref.
Episodes 43–48	49–54 (43–48 edited)	February 16, 2004	
Episodes 49–54	55–60 (49–54 edited)	March 8, 2004	
Episodes 55–60	61–66 (55–60 edited)	April 5, 2004	
Episodes 61–66	68–73 (61–66 edited)	May 10, 2004	
Episodes 67–72	74–79 (67–72 edited)	June 7, 2004	
Episodes 73–77	80–84 (73–77 edited)	July 3, 2004	
Episodes 78–82	85–89 (78–82 edited)	August 2, 2004	

===== Australia and New Zealand =====
Madman Entertainment (Region 4)
Volume	Episodes	Release date	Ref.
Season 2 Part 1	47–68	April 13, 2016	
Season 2 Part 2	69–89	August 16, 2017	
Complete Series	47–89	April 11, 2018	

==== Blu-ray + DVD combo ====
===== United States =====
Viz Media (Region A)
Volume	Episodes	Release date	Ref.
Season 2 Part 1	47–68	July 14, 2015	
Season 2 Part 2	69–89	October 27, 2015	
Complete Second Season [Blu-ray only]	47-89	February 28, 2023	

===== Australia and New Zealand =====
Madman Entertainment (Region B)
Volume	Episodes	Release date	Ref.
Complete Series	47–89	April 11, 2018	

== Film ==
Sailor Moon R: The Movie, originally released in Japan as Pretty Soldier Sailor Moon R: The Movie (劇場版 美少女戦士セーラームーンR, Gekijōban Bishōjo Senshi Sērā Mūn Āru), and later as Pretty Guardian Sailor Moon R: The Movie, and in the United States as Sailor Moon R: The Movie: The Promise of the Rose, is an anime film directed by Kunihiko Ikuhara and written by Sukehiro Tomita. The film debuted in Japanese theaters on December 5, 1993, and Pioneer Entertainment released it in the United States on February 8, 2000. On January 13, 2017, Viz Media re-released the movie re-dubbed and uncut for the first time in American theaters, simply titled Sailor Moon R: The Movie.

The events portrayed in this film seem to take place somewhere in the very end of the series, as Chibiusa knows about the identities of the Sailor Guardians, the characters are in the present rather than the future, and Mamoru and Usagi are back together. The film centers on the arrival of an alien named Fiore on Earth, who has a past with Mamoru and wishes to reunite with him. Unfortunately, Fiore is being controlled by an evil flower called Xenian Flower, forcing Usagi and her friends to save Mamoru and the Earth from destruction.

Japanese theaters featured a 15-minute short recap episode before the film titled Make Up! Sailor Soldier (メイクアップ!セーラー戦士, Meikuappu! Sērā senshi). The re-dub also included the English dubbed short.
