= Arcade Archives =

Video game series

- Genre: Various
- Developer: Hamster Corporation
- Publishers: Hamster Corporation; SNK (iOS / Android only)
- Platforms: PlayStation 4, Xbox One, Windows, Nintendo Switch, iOS, Android, PlayStation 5, Xbox Series X/S, Nintendo Switch 2
- Original release: May 15, 2014: Arcade Archives PlayStation 4; JP: May 15, 2014; NA: August 19, 2014; AS: May 14, 2015; PAL: June 19, 2015 Nintendo Switch; WW: September 27, 2017 ACA Neo Geo PlayStation 4; WW: October 27, 2016 Xbox One; WW: February 23, 2017 Nintendo Switch; WW: March 3, 2017 Windows; WW: December 15, 2017 iOS, Android; WW: November 30, 2021 ACA 2 Neo Geo PlayStation 5, Xbox Series X/S; WW: February 27, 2025 Arcade Archives 2 Nintendo Switch 2, PlayStation 5, Xbox Series X/S; WW: June 5, 2025 Windows; WW: May 28, 2026 Console Archives Nintendo Switch 2; WW: February 5, 2026 PlayStation 5; WW: February 14, 2026

Arcade Archives (Note: Japanese: アーケードアーカイブス, Hepburn: Ākēdo Ākaibusu) is a series of emulated arcade games developed and published by Hamster Corporation. A sub-series called ACA Neo Geo (Note: Japanese: アケアカ Neo Geo, Hepburn: Akeaka Neojio) focuses on re-releasing SNK's Neo Geo titles in their original MVS arcade format, unlike many services that attempt to emulate the console versions. Individual games are released in a weekly format. Another sub-series called Console Archives (Note: Japanese: コンソールアーカイブス, Hepburn: Konsōru Ākaibusu) focuses on releasing home console video games.

== History ==
Hamster Corporation was formed in 1999 by alumni of the video game division of Toshiba EMI. The company previously released similar series, Arcade Hits for the PlayStation, as well as Oretachi Gēsen Zoku, which was released only in Japan for the PlayStation 2. Development is handled at Hamster's various offices, with emulators being developed by a group of Hudson Soft alumni at Sapporo, Hokkaido. Hamster acquired the rights to the intellectual property of various defunct video game developers to release on the service, including Nichibutsu in March 2014, UPL in May 2016, NMK in June 2017, Video System in March 2018, Allumer in February 2023, Athena in September 2023, and Warashi in May 2026.

Despite forming a working relationship with Nintendo by providing games for their Virtual Console service, Nintendo surprised Hamster by agreeing to license their arcade games for the series, on the condition they remain exclusive to the Nintendo Switch. This included Sky Skipper, which was never released formally outside Japan save for a licensed Atari 2600 release by Parker Brothers; Hamster was granted permission to copy the ROM image of the game from the only surviving unmodified boardset archived at Nintendo of America.

== Release ==
Arcade Archives was first released for the PlayStation 4 on May 15, 2014 on the PlayStation Network; Nippon Ichi Software supported development of the series during its earliest years. The Nintendo Switch version was also launched on the Nintendo eShop on March 3, 2017, initially focusing on Neo Geo games before adding other arcade games, including titles from Nintendo. It supports various system-specific features, allowing players to share screenshots and videos and compete with others for online rankings.

The Xbox One version of the service, which only includes Neo Geo games, launched on February 23, 2017 on Xbox Games Store. The Windows version of the service was launched on December 15, 2017, through the Microsoft Store and, like the Xbox One version, only includes Neo Geo games. ACA Neo Geo games were released on iOS (via the App Store) and Android (via Google Play) by SNK on November 30, 2021.

In May 2024, Hamster announced ACA2 Neo Geo (Note: Japanese: アケアカ2 Neo Geo, Hepburn: Akeaka2 Neojio) for the PlayStation 5 and Xbox Series X/S. Main features of standard ACA2 Neo Geo games include Time Attack and Network (online play) modes. Users who previously purchased ACA Neo Geo titles on PlayStation 4 and Xbox One receive a discount on the purchase of ACA2 Neo Geo titles. ACA2 Neo Geo debuted on the PlayStation 5 and Xbox Series X/S starting February 27, 2025, with The King of Fighters '98: The Slugfest being the debut title.

During the Nintendo Direct for the Nintendo Switch 2, Hamster announced Arcade Archives 2, with the debut title, Ridge Racer, released alongside the system on launch day. Hamster confirmed on subsequent days that Arcade Archives 2 would also be available on the PlayStation 5 and Xbox Series X/S, also featuring Ridge Racer as a debut title. Nintendo Switch and PlayStation 4 versions of the game were confirmed for re-release as part of the original Arcade Archives. Users who bought previous titles released for the PlayStation 4 and Nintendo Switch will receive a discount for the Arcade Archives 2 versions on the PlayStation 5 and Nintendo Switch 2. Its titles were initially released on a monthly schedule before eventually changing to a nearly weekly schedule. The Windows version of Arcade Archives 2 was released on May 28, 2026 with Tatakae! Big Fighter as its debut launch title. Versions of the game were also available for the Nintendo Switch 2, PlayStation 5 and Xbox Series X/S the same day.

A few games, including Irem's R-Type and Tecmo's Ganbare Ginkun, were announced but not released. According to Hamster, the latter was blocked from release due to excessive graphic violence and insensitive content.

== Games ==
There are currently 434 games on the original Arcade Archives list, 78 games on the Arcade Archives 2 list, 110 games on the ACA Neo Geo list, 1 game on the ACA2 Neo Geo list, and 42 games on the Console Archives list below. (Note: These numbers are always up to date by this script.)

=== Arcade Archives ===
Titles in the Arcade Archives series
| Title | Company | Original release | ACA Release date | | | | ACA Platforms | |
| Title | Company | Original release | JP | NA | EU/AU | Asia | NS | PS4 |
|---|---|---|---|---|---|---|---|---|
| 10-Yard Fight | Irem | 1983 | May 2, 2018 | May 2, 2018 ^{NS} Jun 14, 2018 ^{PS4} | May 2, 2018 ^{NS} Jun 22, 2018 ^{PS4} | May 2, 2018 ^{PS4} | Yes | Yes |
| 64th Street | Jaleco | 1992 | Oct 29, 2020 | Oct 29, 2020 ^{NS} Nov 7, 2020 ^{PS4} | Oct 29, 2020 ^{NS} Nov 7, 2020 ^{PS4} | Unreleased | Yes | Yes |
| A-Jax (Typhoon) | Konami | 1987 | Mar 19, 2015 ^{PS4} Apr 22, 2021 ^{NS} | Sep 8, 2015 ^{PS4} Apr 22, 2021 ^{NS} | Oct 20, 2015 ^{PS4} Apr 22, 2021 ^{NS} | Jun 18, 2015 ^{PS4} | Yes | Yes |
| Ace Driver | Namco | 1994 | May 28, 2026 | May 28, 2026 | May 28, 2026 | May 28, 2026 ^{PS4} | Yes | Yes |
| Ace Driver: Victory Lap | Namco | 1996 | Oct 22, 2026 | Oct 22, 2026 | Oct 22, 2026 | Oct 22, 2026 ^{PS4} | Yes | Yes |
| Adventure Canoe | Taito | 1982 | Feb 19, 2026 | Feb 19, 2026 | Feb 19, 2026 | Feb 19, 2026 ^{PS4} | Yes | Yes |
| Aero Fighters (Sonic Wings) | Video System | 1992 | Dec 14, 2023 | Dec 14, 2023 | Dec 14, 2023 | Dec 14, 2023 ^{PS4} | Yes | Yes |
| Air Combat 22 | Namco | 1995 | Jul 3, 2025 | Jul 3, 2025 | Jul 3, 2025 | Jul 3, 2025 ^{PS4} | Yes | Yes |
| Alpha Mission (ASO) | SNK | 1985 | Oct 25, 2018 | Oct 25, 2018 ^{NS} Jul 18, 2019 ^{PS4} | Oct 25, 2018 ^{NS} | Oct 25, 2018 ^{PS4} | Yes | Yes |
| Alpine Ski | Taito | 1982 | May 30, 2019 | May 30, 2019 | May 30, 2019 ^{NS} | May 30, 2019 ^{PS4} | Yes | Yes |
| Aqua Jet | Namco | 1996 | Aug 14, 2025 | Aug 14, 2025 | Aug 14, 2025 | Aug 14, 2025 ^{PS4} | Yes | Yes |
| Arabian | Sunsoft | 1983 | Oct 8, 2020 | Oct 8, 2020 ^{NS} Oct 15, 2020 ^{PS4} | Oct 8, 2020 ^{NS} Oct 15, 2020 ^{PS4} | Oct 8, 2020 ^{PS4} | Yes | Yes |
| Argus | Jaleco | 1986 | Aug 30, 2018 | Aug 30, 2018 ^{NS} May 16, 2019 ^{PS4} | Aug 30, 2018 ^{NS} | Aug 30, 2018 ^{PS4} | Yes | Yes |
| Ark Area | UPL | 1987 | Jan 19, 2017 ^{PS4} May 18, 2023 ^{NS} | May 18, 2023 ^{NS} | May 18, 2023 ^{NS} | Jan 19, 2017 ^{PS4} | Yes | Yes |
| Arkanoid | Taito | 1986 | May 7, 2026 | May 7, 2026 | May 7, 2026 | May 7, 2026 ^{PS4} | Yes | Yes |
| Arkanoid: Revenge of Doh | Taito | 1987 | Sep 3, 2026 | Sep 3, 2026 | Sep 3, 2026 | Sep 3, 2026 ^{PS4} | Yes | Yes |
| Armadillo Racing | Namco | 1997 | Jul 23, 2026 | Jul 23, 2026 | Jul 23, 2026 | Jul 23, 2026 ^{PS4} | Yes | Yes |
| Armed F | Nichibutsu | 1988 | May 27, 2016 ^{PS4} Mar 28, 2019 ^{NS} | May 27, 2016 ^{PS4} Mar 28, 2019 ^{NS} | Jan 31, 2017 ^{PS4} Mar 28, 2019 ^{NS} | May 27, 2016 ^{PS4} | Yes | Yes |
| Assault | Namco | 1988 | Sep 29, 2022 | Sep 29, 2022 | Sep 29, 2022 | Sep 29, 2022 ^{PS4} | Yes | Yes |
| Assault Plus | Namco | 1988 | Apr 3, 2025 | Apr 3, 2025 | Apr 3, 2025 | Apr 3, 2025 ^{PS4} | Yes | Yes |
| The Astyanax | Jaleco | 1989 | May 6, 2021 | May 6, 2021 | May 6, 2021 | Unreleased | Yes | Yes |
| Athena | SNK | 1986 | Dec 13, 2018 | Dec 13, 2018 ^{NS} Dec 19, 2018 ^{PS4} | Dec 13, 2018 ^{NS} Dec 19, 2019 ^{PS4} | Dec 13, 2018 ^{PS4} | Yes | Yes |
| Atomic Robo-Kid | UPL | 1988 | Sep 29, 2016 ^{PS4} Nov 15, 2018 ^{NS} | Nov 15, 2018 ^{NS} | Nov 15, 2018 ^{NS} | Sep 30, 2016 ^{PS4} | Yes | Yes |
| Balloon Bomber | Taito | 1980 | Oct 1, 2026 | Oct 1, 2026 | Oct 1, 2026 | Oct 1, 2026 ^{PS4} | Yes | Yes |
| Baraduke | Namco | 1985 | Nov 10, 2022 | Nov 10, 2022 | Nov 10, 2022 | Nov 10, 2022 ^{PS4} | Yes | Yes |
| Baraduke 2 | Namco | 1988 | Aug 3, 2023 | Aug 3, 2023 | Aug 3, 2023 | Aug 3, 2023 ^{PS4} | Yes | Yes |
| Battlantis | Konami | 1987 | Oct 9, 2025 | Oct 9, 2025 | Oct 9, 2025 | Oct 9, 2025 ^{PS4} | Yes | Yes |
| Ben Bero Beh | Taito | 1984 | Oct 1, 2020 | Oct 1, 2020 ^{NS} Oct 8, 2020 ^{PS4} | Oct 1, 2020 ^{NS} Oct 8, 2020 ^{PS4} | Oct 1, 2020 ^{PS4} | Yes | Yes |
| Bermuda Triangle | SNK | 1987 | Dec 4, 2025 | Dec 4, 2025 | Dec 4, 2025 | Dec 4, 2025 ^{PS4} | Yes | Yes |
| Bio-ship Paladin | UPL | 1990 | Aug 5, 2021 | Aug 5, 2021 | Aug 5, 2021 | Aug 5, 2021 ^{PS4} | Yes | Yes |
| Black Heart | UPL | 1991 | Nov 4, 2021 | Nov 4, 2021 | Nov 4, 2021 | Nov 4, 2021 ^{PS4} | Yes | Yes |
| Blandia | Allumer | 1992 | Oct 19, 2023 | Oct 19, 2023 | Oct 19, 2023 | Oct 19, 2023 ^{PS4} | Yes | Yes |
| Blast Off | Namco | 1989 | Sep 26, 2024 | Sep 26, 2024 | Sep 26, 2024 | Sep 26, 2024 ^{PS4} | Yes | Yes |
| Block Hole (Quarth) | Konami | 1989 | Jan 21, 2021 | Jan 21, 2021 | Jan 21, 2021 | Jan 21, 2021 ^{PS4} | Yes | Yes |
| Bomb Bee | Namco | 1979 | Nov 20, 2025 | Nov 20, 2025 | Nov 20, 2025 | Nov 20, 2025 ^{PS4} | Yes | Yes |
| Bomb Jack | Tehkan | 1984 | Jun 19, 2014 ^{PS4} Jan 24, 2019 ^{NS} | Aug 18, 2015 ^{PS4} Jan 24, 2019 ^{NS} | Jan 24, 2019 ^{NS} | Unreleased | Yes | Yes |
| Bomb Jack Twin | NMK | 1993 | Jan 15, 2026 | Jan 15, 2026 | Jan 15, 2026 | Jan 15, 2026 ^{PS4} | Yes | Yes |
| Bonze Adventure | Taito | 1988 | Mar 23, 2023 | Mar 23, 2023 | Mar 23, 2023 | Mar 23, 2023 ^{PS4} | Yes | Yes |
| Bosconian | Namco | 1981 | Aug 24, 2023 | Aug 24, 2023 | Aug 24, 2023 | Aug 24, 2023 ^{PS4} | Yes | Yes |
| Bravoman | Namco | 1988 | Jun 8, 2023 | Jun 8, 2023 | Jun 8, 2023 | Jun 8, 2023 ^{PS4} | Yes | Yes |
| Bubble Bobble | Taito | 1986 | Jan 29, 2016 ^{PS4} Dec 29, 2022 ^{NS} | Mar 15, 2016 ^{PS4} Dec 29, 2022 ^{NS} | Apr 1, 2016 ^{PS4} Dec 29, 2022 ^{NS} | Jun 14, 2016 ^{PS4} | Yes | Yes |
| BurgerTime | Data East | 1982 | Jul 30, 2020 | Jul 30, 2020 ^{NS} Aug 14, 2020 ^{PS4} | Jul 30, 2020 ^{NS} Aug 15, 2020 ^{PS4} | Jul 30, 2020 ^{PS4} | Yes | Yes |
| Burnin' Rubber | Data East | 1982 | Sep 24, 2020 | Sep 24, 2020 ^{NS} | Sep 24, 2020 ^{NS} | Sep 24, 2020 ^{PS4} | Yes | Yes |
| Burning Force | Namco | 1989 | Oct 26, 2023 | Oct 26, 2023 | Oct 26, 2023 | Oct 26, 2023 ^{PS4} | Yes | Yes |
| Butasan | Jaleco | 1987 | Mar 12, 2015 ^{PS4} May 16, 2019 ^{NS} | Jul 14, 2015 ^{PS4} May 16, 2019 ^{NS} | Oct 6, 2015 ^{PS4} May 16, 2019 ^{NS} | Unreleased | Yes | Yes |
| Cadash | Taito | 1989 | Aug 31, 2023 | Aug 31, 2023 | Aug 31, 2023 | Aug 31, 2023 ^{PS4} | Yes | Yes |
| Cameltry | Taito | 1989 | Jun 4, 2026 | Jun 4, 2026 | Jun 4, 2026 | Jun 4, 2026 ^{PS4} | Yes | Yes |
| Castle of Dragon | Athena | 1989 | Jan 2, 2025 | Jan 2, 2025 | Jan 2, 2025 | Jan 2, 2025 ^{PS4} | Yes | Yes |
| Chack'n Pop | Taito | 1984 | Jul 21, 2022 | Jul 21, 2022 | Jul 21, 2022 | Jul 21, 2022 ^{PS4} | Yes | Yes |
| Champion Wrestler | Taito | 1989 | Sep 8, 2022 | Sep 8, 2022 | Sep 8, 2022 | Sep 8, 2022 ^{PS4} | Yes | Yes |
| Chopper I | SNK | 1988 | Aug 21, 2025 | Aug 21, 2025 | Aug 21, 2025 | Aug 21, 2025 ^{PS4} | Yes | Yes |
| Circus Charlie | Konami | 1984 | Aug 6, 2020 | Aug 6, 2020 | Aug 6, 2020 | Aug 6, 2020 ^{PS4} | Yes | Yes |
| City Bomber | Konami | 1987 | Dec 5, 2024 | Dec 5, 2024 | Dec 5, 2024 | Dec 5, 2024 ^{PS4} | Yes | Yes |
| City Connection | Jaleco | 1985 | Oct 2, 2014 ^{PS4} Jul 19, 2018 ^{NS} | May 5, 2015 ^{PS4} Jul 19, 2018 ^{NS} | Sep 8, 2015 ^{PS4} Jul 19, 2018 ^{NS} | Unreleased | Yes | Yes |
| Combat School | Konami | 1987 | Aug 6, 2026 | Aug 6, 2026 | Aug 6, 2026 | Aug 6, 2026 ^{PS4} | Yes | Yes |
| Contra | Konami | 1987 | Aug 10, 2016 ^{PS4} Sep 3, 2020 ^{NS} | Sep 27, 2016 ^{PS4} Sep 3, 2020 ^{NS} | Nov 15, 2016 ^{PS4} Sep 3, 2020 ^{NS} | Aug 10, 2016 ^{PS4} | Yes | Yes |
| Cop 01 | Nichibutsu | 1985 | Jun 29, 2023 | Jun 29, 2023 | Jun 29, 2023 | Jun 29, 2023 ^{PS4} | Yes | Yes |
| Cosmo Gang the Puzzle | Namco | 1992 | Jan 11, 2024 | Jan 11, 2024 | Jan 11, 2024 | Jan 11, 2024 ^{PS4} | Yes | Yes |
| Cosmo Gang the Video | Namco | 1992 | Apr 20, 2023 | Apr 20, 2023 | Apr 20, 2023 | Apr 20, 2023 ^{PS4} | Yes | Yes |
| Cosmo Police Galivan | Nichibutsu | 1985 | Apr 9, 2015 ^{PS4} Jan 14, 2021 ^{NS} | Oct 20, 2015 ^{PS4} Jan 14, 2021 ^{NS} | Feb 9, 2016 ^{PS4} Jan 14, 2021 ^{NS} | Aug 6, 2015 ^{PS4} | Yes | Yes |
| Cotton: Fantastic Night Dreams | Success | 1991 | Nov 28, 2024 | Nov 28, 2024 | Nov 28, 2024 | Nov 28, 2024 ^{PS4} | Yes | Yes |
| Crazy Balloon | Taito | 1980 | Jun 26, 2025 | Jun 26, 2025 | Jun 26, 2025 | Jun 26, 2025 ^{PS4} | Yes | Yes |
| Crazy Climber | Nichibutsu | 1980 | May 15, 2014 ^{PS4} Feb 8, 2018 ^{NS} | May 26, 2015 ^{PS4} Feb 8, 2018 ^{NS} | Jun 19, 2015 ^{PS4} Feb 8, 2018 ^{NS} | May 14, 2015 ^{PS4} | Yes | Yes |
| Crazy Climber 2 | Nichibutsu | 1988 | Feb 26, 2015 ^{PS4} May 28, 2020 ^{NS} | Oct 15, 2015 ^{PS4} May 28, 2020 ^{NS} | Jan 19, 2016 ^{PS4} May 28, 2020 ^{NS} | Jul 30, 2015 ^{PS4} | Yes | Yes |
| Crime City | Taito | 1989 | Sep 19, 2024 | Sep 19, 2024 | Sep 19, 2024 | Sep 19, 2024 ^{PS4} | Yes | Yes |
| Crime Fighters | Konami | 1989 | Mar 18, 2021 | Mar 18, 2021 | Mar 18, 2021 | Mar 18, 2021 ^{PS4} | Yes | Yes |
| Cue Brick | Konami | 1989 | May 30, 2024 | May 30, 2024 | May 30, 2024 | May 30, 2024 ^{PS4} | Yes | Yes |
| Cybattler | Jaleco | 1993 | Feb 18, 2021 | Feb 18, 2021 | Feb 18, 2021 | Unreleased | Yes | Yes |
| Cyber Commando | Namco | 1994 | Apr 30, 2026 | Apr 30, 2026 | Apr 30, 2026 | Apr 30, 2026 ^{PS4} | Yes | Yes |
| Cyber Cycles | Namco | 1995 | Aug 20, 2026 | Aug 20, 2026 | Aug 20, 2026 | Aug 20, 2026 ^{PS4} | Yes | Yes |
| D-Day | Jaleco | 1984 | Aug 7, 2025 | Aug 7, 2025 | Aug 7, 2025 | Unreleased | Yes | Yes |
| Dacholer | Nichibutsu | 1983 | Sep 25, 2025 | Sep 25, 2025 | Sep 25, 2025 | Sep 25, 2025 ^{PS4} | Yes | Yes |
| Daioh | Athena | 1993 | Nov 2, 2023 | Nov 2, 2023 | Nov 2, 2023 | Nov 2, 2023 ^{PS4} | Yes | Yes |
| Dangerous Seed | Namco | 1989 | Feb 17, 2022 | Feb 17, 2022 | Feb 17, 2022 | Feb 17, 2022 ^{PS4} | Yes | Yes |
| Darius | Taito | 1986 | Aug 26, 2016 ^{PS4} Oct 6, 2022 ^{NS} | Oct 6, 2022 ^{NS} | Oct 6, 2022 ^{NS} | Aug 26, 2016 ^{PS4} | Yes | Yes |
| Darius II | Taito | 1989 | Oct 5, 2023 | Oct 5, 2023 | Oct 5, 2023 | Oct 5, 2023 ^{PS4} | Yes | Yes |
| Dark Adventure | Konami | 1987 | Aug 17, 2023 | Aug 17, 2023 | Aug 17, 2023 | Aug 17, 2023 ^{PS4} | Yes | Yes |
| Darwin 4078 | Data East | 1986 | Jul 15, 2021 | Jul 15, 2021 | Jul 15, 2021 | Jul 15, 2021 ^{PS4} | Yes | Yes |
| Dead Connection | Taito | 1992 | Feb 27, 2025 | Feb 27, 2025 | Feb 27, 2025 | Feb 27, 2025 ^{PS4} | Yes | Yes |
| Detana!! TwinBee (Bells & Whistles) | Konami | 1991 | Jan 16, 2020 | Jan 16, 2020 | Jan 16, 2020 | Jan 16, 2020 ^{PS4} | Yes | Yes |
| Devastators | Konami | 1988 | Mar 19, 2026 | Mar 19, 2026 | Mar 19, 2026 | Mar 19, 2026 ^{PS4} | Yes | Yes |
| Dig Dug | Namco | 1982 | Aug 4, 2022 | Aug 4, 2022 | Aug 4, 2022 | Aug 4, 2022 ^{PS4} | Yes | Yes |
| Dig Dug II | Namco | 1985 | Apr 13, 2023 | Apr 13, 2023 | Apr 13, 2023 | Apr 13, 2023 ^{PS4} | Yes | Yes |
| Dino Rex | Taito | 1992 | Nov 16, 2023 | Nov 16, 2023 | Nov 16, 2023 | Nov 16, 2023 ^{PS4} | Yes | Yes |
| Don Doko Don | Taito | 1989 | Feb 24, 2023 | Feb 24, 2023 | Feb 24, 2023 | Feb 24, 2023 ^{PS4} | Yes | Yes |
| Donkey Kong | Nintendo | 1981 | Jun 15, 2018 | Jun 14, 2018 | Jun 15, 2018 | Unreleased | Yes | No |
| Donkey Kong Jr. | Nintendo | 1982 | Dec 21, 2018 | Dec 21, 2018 | Dec 21, 2018 | Unreleased | Yes | No |
| Donkey Kong 3 | Nintendo | 1983 | Apr 5, 2019 | Apr 5, 2019 | Apr 5, 2019 | Unreleased | Yes | No |
| Double Dragon | Technōs Japan | 1987 | Nov 27, 2014 ^{PS4} Jan 18, 2018 ^{NS} | May 12, 2015 ^{PS4} Jan 18, 2018 ^{NS} | Jul 14, 2015 ^{PS4} Jan 18, 2018 ^{NS} | May 21, 2015 ^{PS4} | Yes | Yes |
| Double Dragon II: The Revenge | Technōs Japan | 1989 | Feb 26, 2016 ^{PS4} Dec 6, 2018 ^{NS} | Feb 26, 2016 ^{PS4} Dec 6, 2018 ^{NS} | Feb 26, 2016 ^{PS4} Dec 6, 2018 ^{NS} | Feb 26, 2016 ^{PS4} | Yes | Yes |
| Dragon Buster | Namco | 1984 | Dec 9, 2021 | Dec 9, 2021 | Dec 9, 2021 | Dec 9, 2021 ^{PS4} | Yes | Yes |
| Dragon Saber | Namco | 1990 | Jul 14, 2022 | Jul 14, 2022 | Jul 14, 2022 | Jul 14, 2022 ^{PS4} | Yes | Yes |
| Dragon Spirit | Namco | 1987 | Mar 3, 2022 | Mar 3, 2022 | Mar 3, 2022 | Mar 3, 2022 ^{PS4} | Yes | Yes |
| E.D.F.: Earth Defense Force | Jaleco | 1991 | Sep 17, 2020 | Sep 17, 2020 ^{NS} Aug 5, 2021 ^{PS4} | Sep 17, 2020 ^{NS} Aug 5, 2021 ^{PS4} | Unreleased | Yes | Yes |
| Elevator Action | Taito | 1983 | Oct 26, 2017 ^{PS4} Mar 14, 2019 ^{NS} | Nov 9, 2017 ^{PS4} Mar 14, 2019 ^{NS} | Nov 23, 2017 ^{PS4} Mar 14, 2019 ^{NS} | Oct 26, 2017 ^{PS4} | Yes | Yes |
| Emeraldia | Namco | 1993 | Apr 18, 2024 | Apr 18, 2024 | Apr 18, 2024 | Apr 18, 2024 ^{PS4} | Yes | Yes |
| Empire City: 1931 | Seibu Kaihatsu | 1986 | Mar 24, 2022 | Mar 24, 2022 ^{PS4} Mar 31, 2022 ^{NS} | Mar 24, 2022 | Mar 24, 2022 ^{PS4} | Yes | Yes |
| Escape Kids | Konami | 1991 | Jan 16, 2025 | Jan 16, 2025 | Jan 16, 2025 | Jan 16, 2025 ^{PS4} | Yes | Yes |
| Excitebike | Nintendo | 1984 | Sep 21, 2018 | Sep 21, 2018 | Sep 21, 2018 | Unreleased | Yes | No |
| Exerion | Jaleco | 1983 | Oct 23, 2014 ^{PS4} Jan 9, 2020 ^{NS} | Jul 7, 2015 ^{PS4} Jan 9, 2020 ^{NS} | Jul 22, 2015 ^{PS4} Jan 9, 2020 ^{NS} | Unreleased | Yes | Yes |
| Exvania | Namco | 1992 | Apr 4, 2024 | Apr 4, 2024 | Apr 4, 2024 | Apr 4, 2024 ^{PS4} | Yes | Yes |
| Exzisus | Taito | 1987 | Nov 5, 2026 | Nov 5, 2026 | Nov 5, 2026 | Nov 5, 2026 ^{PS4} | Yes | Yes |
| F/A | Namco | 1992 | May 15, 2024 | Unreleased | Unreleased | Unreleased | Yes | Yes |
| Face Off | Namco | 1988 | Feb 8, 2024 | Feb 8, 2024^{(Note: Unavailable in the United States, but available in Canada, Mexico and Brazil.)} | Feb 8, 2024^{(Note: Available in Switzerland and South Africa only.)} | Feb 8, 2024 ^{PS4} | Yes | Yes |
| The Fairyland Story | Taito | 1985 | Dec 3, 2020 | Dec 3, 2020 | Dec 3, 2020 | Dec 3, 2020 ^{PS4} | Yes | Yes |
| Field Day | Taito | 1984 | Jul 31, 2025 | Jul 31, 2025 | Jul 31, 2025 | Jul 31, 2025 ^{PS4} | Yes | Yes |
| Fighting Golf | SNK | 1988 | Oct 8, 2026 | Oct 8, 2026 | Oct 8, 2026 | Oct 8, 2026 ^{PS4} | Yes | Yes |
| Fighting Hawk | Taito | 1988 | May 6, 2022 | May 6, 2022 | May 6, 2022 | May 6, 2022 ^{PS4} | Yes | Yes |
| Final Blow | Taito | 1988 | Nov 21, 2024 | Nov 21, 2024 | Nov 21, 2024 | Nov 21, 2024 ^{PS4} | Yes | Yes |
| Final Lap | Namco | 1987 | Mar 26, 2026 | Mar 26, 2026 | Mar 26, 2026 | Mar 26, 2026 ^{PS4} | Yes | Yes |
| The Final Round | Konami | 1988 | Aug 1, 2024 | Aug 1, 2024 | Aug 1, 2024 | Aug 1, 2024 ^{PS4} | Yes | Yes |
| Final Star Force | Tecmo | 1992 | Jan 23, 2025 | Jan 23, 2025 | Jan 23, 2025 | Jan 23, 2025 ^{PS4} | Yes | Yes |
| Finalizer: Super Transformation | Konami | 1985 | Aug 29, 2024 | Aug 29, 2024 | Aug 29, 2024 | Aug 29, 2024 ^{PS4} | Yes | Yes |
| Finest Hour | Namco | 1989 | Sep 28, 2023 | Sep 28, 2023 | Sep 28, 2023 | Sep 28, 2023 ^{PS4} | Yes | Yes |
| Flipull | Taito | 1989 | May 26, 2022 | May 26, 2022 | May 26, 2022 | May 26, 2022 ^{PS4} | Yes | Yes |
| Formation Z | Jaleco | 1984 | Mar 19, 2020 | Mar 19, 2020 | Mar 19, 2020 | Unreleased | Yes | Yes |
| Frisky Tom | Nichibutsu | 1981 | Apr 15, 2021 | Apr 15, 2021 | Apr 15, 2021 | Apr 15, 2021 ^{PS4} | Yes | Yes |
| Frogger | Konami | 1981 | Dec 12, 2019 | Dec 12, 2019 | Dec 12, 2019 ^{NS} Dec 19, 2019 ^{PS4} | Dec 12, 2019 ^{PS4} | Yes | Yes |
| Front Line | Taito | 1983 | Dec 26, 2017 ^{PS4} Feb 14, 2019 ^{NS} | Jan 8, 2018 ^{PS4} Feb 14, 2019 ^{NS} | Jan 17, 2018 ^{PS4} Feb 14, 2019 ^{NS} | Jan 9, 2018 ^{PS4} | Yes | Yes |
| Galactic Warriors | Konami | 1985 | Nov 13, 2025 | Nov 13, 2025 | Nov 13, 2025 | Nov 13, 2025 ^{PS4} | Yes | Yes |
| Galaga | Namco | 1981 | Jan 5, 2023 | Jan 5, 2023 | Jan 5, 2023 | Jan 5, 2023 ^{PS4} | Yes | Yes |
| Galaga '88 | Namco | 1987 | Apr 27, 2023 | Apr 27, 2023 | Apr 27, 2023 | Apr 27, 2023 ^{PS4} | Yes | Yes |
| Galaxian | Namco | 1979 | Nov 24, 2022 | Nov 24, 2022 | Nov 24, 2022 | Nov 24, 2022 ^{PS4} | Yes | Yes |
| Gangbusters | Konami | 1988 | Apr 10, 2025 | Apr 10, 2025 | Apr 10, 2025 | Apr 10, 2025 ^{PS4} | Yes | Yes |
| Gaplus | Namco | 1984 | Apr 21, 2022 | Apr 21, 2022 | Apr 21, 2022 | Apr 21, 2022 ^{PS4} | Yes | Yes |
| Gee Bee | Namco | 1978 | Oct 2, 2025 | Oct 2, 2025 ^{PS4} Oct 3, 2025 ^{NS} | Oct 2, 2025 | Oct 2, 2025 ^{PS4} | Yes | Yes |
| Gemini Wing | Tecmo | 1987 | Sep 10, 2020 | Sep 10, 2020 | Sep 10, 2020 | Sep 10, 2020 ^{PS4} | Yes | Yes |
| Genpei Tōma Den (The Genji and the Heike Clans) | Namco | 1986 | Oct 7, 2021 | Oct 7, 2021 | Oct 7, 2021 | Oct 7, 2021 ^{PS4} | Yes | Yes |
| Golf | Nintendo | 1984 | Oct 25, 2019 | Oct 25, 2019 | Oct 25, 2019 | Unreleased | Yes | No |
| Gradius | Konami | 1985 | Jan 29, 2015 ^{PS4} Jul 9, 2020 ^{NS} | Jun 9, 2015 ^{PS4} Jul 9, 2020 ^{NS} | Jun 23, 2015 ^{PS4} Jul 9, 2020 ^{NS} | May 21, 2015 ^{PS4} | Yes | Yes |
| Gradius II (Vulcan Venture) | Konami | 1988 | Apr 22, 2016 ^{PS4} Nov 12, 2020 ^{NS} | Jul 15, 2016 ^{PS4} Nov 12, 2020 ^{NS} | Aug 23, 2016 ^{PS4} Nov 12, 2020 ^{NS} | Apr 22, 2016 ^{PS4} | Yes | Yes |
| Gradius III | Konami | 1989 | Dec 24, 2020 | Dec 24, 2020 | Dec 24, 2020 | Dec 24, 2020 ^{PS4} | Yes | Yes |
| Grobda | Namco | 1984 | Feb 16, 2023 | Feb 16, 2023 | Feb 16, 2023 | Feb 16, 2023 ^{PS4} | Yes | Yes |
| Growl | Taito | 1990 | Jul 27, 2023 | Jul 27, 2023 | Jul 27, 2023 | Jul 27, 2023 ^{PS4} | Yes | Yes |
| Guerrilla War | SNK | 1987 | Feb 25, 2021 | Feb 25, 2021 ^{NS} Feb 27, 2021 ^{PS4} | Feb 25, 2021 ^{NS} Feb 28, 2021 ^{PS4} | Feb 25, 2021 ^{PS4} | Yes | Yes |
| Gun Frontier | Taito | 1990 | Aug 12, 2022 | Aug 12, 2022 | Aug 12, 2022 | Aug 12, 2022 ^{PS4} | Yes | Yes |
| Gunnail | NMK | 1993 | Jan 13, 2022 | Jan 13, 2022 | Jan 13, 2022 | Jan 13, 2022 ^{PS4} | Yes | Yes |
| Guttang Gottong | Konami | 1982 | Oct 12, 2023 | Oct 12, 2023 | Oct 12, 2023 | Oct 12, 2023 ^{PS4} | Yes | Yes |
| Guzzler | Tehkan | 1983 | May 13, 2021 ^{NS} May 14, 2021 ^{PS4} | May 13, 2021 | May 13, 2021 | May 14, 2021 ^{PS4} | Yes | Yes |
| Hacha Mecha Fighter | NMK | 1991 | Jun 3, 2021 | Jun 3, 2021 | Jun 3, 2021 | Jun 3, 2021 ^{PS4} | Yes | Yes |
| Halley's Comet | Taito | 1986 | Jan 28, 2021 | Jan 28, 2021 | Jan 28, 2021 | Jan 28, 2021 ^{PS4} | Yes | Yes |
| Hat Trick Hero (Football Champ) | Taito | 1990 | Jul 18, 2024 | Jul 18, 2024 | Jul 18, 2024 | Jul 18, 2024 ^{PS4} | Yes | Yes |
| Haunted Castle | Konami | 1988 | Dec 1, 2016 ^{PS4} Apr 1, 2021 ^{NS} | Sep 14, 2017 ^{PS4} Apr 1, 2021 ^{NS} | Sep 14, 2017 ^{PS4} Apr 1, 2021 ^{NS} | Dec 1, 2016 ^{PS4} | Yes | Yes |
| Highway Race | Taito | 1983 | Feb 24, 2022 | Feb 24, 2022 | Feb 24, 2022 | Feb 24, 2022 ^{PS4} | Yes | Yes |
| Hopping Mappy | Namco | 1986 | Jan 20, 2022 | Jan 20, 2022 | Jan 20, 2022 | Jan 20, 2022 ^{PS4} | Yes | Yes |
| Hyper Crash | Konami | 1987 | Jul 9, 2026 | Jul 9, 2026 | Jul 9, 2026 | Jul 9, 2026 ^{PS4} | Yes | Yes |
| Hyper Sports | Konami | 1984 | Nov 28, 2019 | Nov 28, 2019 ^{NS} Dec 5, 2019 ^{PS4} | Nov 28, 2019 ^{NS} Dec 12, 2019 ^{PS4} | Nov 28, 2019 ^{PS4} | Yes | Yes |
| Ice Climber | Nintendo | 1984 | Feb 22, 2019 | Feb 22, 2019 | Feb 22, 2019 | Unreleased | Yes | No |
| Ikari Warriors | SNK | 1986 | Mar 7, 2019 | Mar 7, 2019 ^{NS} Mar 12, 2019 ^{PS4} | Mar 7, 2019 ^{NS} Feb 11, 2020 ^{PS4} | Mar 7, 2019 ^{PS4} | Yes | Yes |
| Ikari III: The Rescue | SNK | 1989 | Mar 26, 2020 | Mar 26, 2020 | Mar 26, 2020 | Mar 26, 2020 ^{PS4} | Yes | Yes |
| Ikki | Sunsoft | 1985 | May 22, 2015 ^{PS4} May 24, 2018 ^{NS} | Nov 3, 2015 ^{PS4} May 24, 2018 ^{NS} | Apr 12, 2016 ^{PS4} May 24, 2018 ^{NS} | Aug 12, 2015 ^{PS4} | Yes | Yes |
| Image Fight | Irem | 1988 | May 23, 2019 | May 23, 2019 | May 23, 2019 ^{NS} Mar 19, 2020 ^{PS4} | May 23, 2019 ^{PS4} | Yes | Yes |
| In the Hunt | Irem | 1993 | Nov 21, 2019 | Nov 21, 2019 ^{NS} Nov 25, 2019 ^{PS4} | Nov 21, 2019 ^{NS} Nov 25, 2019 ^{PS4} | Nov 21, 2019 ^{PS4} | Yes | Yes |
| Itazura Tenshi | Nichibutsu | 1984 | Nov 4, 2022 | Nov 4, 2022 | Nov 4, 2022 | Nov 4, 2022 ^{PS4} | Yes | Yes |
| Jackal | Konami | 1986 | Jun 27, 2024 | Jun 27, 2024 | Jun 27, 2024 | Jun 27, 2024 ^{PS4} | Yes | Yes |
| Jail Break | Konami | 1986 | Sep 14, 2023 | Sep 14, 2023 | Sep 14, 2023 | Sep 14, 2023 ^{PS4} | Yes | Yes |
| Jungler | Konami | 1981 | Feb 22, 2024 | Feb 22, 2024 | Feb 22, 2024 | Feb 22, 2024 ^{PS4} | Yes | Yes |
| Juno First | Konami | 1983 | Mar 13, 2025 | Mar 13, 2025 | Mar 13, 2025 | Mar 13, 2025 ^{PS4} | Yes | Yes |
| Kangaroo | Sunsoft | 1982 | Jul 16, 2020 | Jul 16, 2020 | Jul 16, 2020 | Jul 16, 2020 ^{PS4} | Yes | Yes |
| Karate Blazers | Video System | 1991 | Nov 27, 2025 | Nov 27, 2025 | Nov 27, 2025 | Nov 27, 2025 ^{PS4} | Yes | Yes |
| Karate Champ | Data East | 1984 | Oct 9, 2014 ^{PS4} Oct 3, 2019 ^{NS} | Sep 29, 2015 ^{PS4} Oct 3, 2019 ^{NS} | Jul 28, 2015 ^{PS4} Oct 3, 2019 ^{NS} | Jul 2, 2015 ^{PS4} | Yes | Yes |
| Karnov | Data East | 1987 | Sep 10, 2026 | Sep 10, 2026 | Sep 10, 2026 | Sep 10, 2026 ^{PS4} | Yes | Yes |
| Kid Niki: Radical Ninja | Irem | 1986 | Jan 25, 2018 | Jan 25, 2018 ^{NS} Feb 25, 2019 ^{PS4} | Jan 25, 2018 ^{NS} | Jan 25, 2018 ^{PS4} | Yes | Yes |
| Kid's Horehore Daisakusen | Nichibutsu | 1987 | Feb 12, 2016 ^{PS4} Aug 9, 2018 ^{NS} | Apr 26, 2016 ^{PS4} Aug 9, 2018 ^{NS} | Aug 30, 2016 ^{PS4} Aug 9, 2018 ^{NS} | Feb 12, 2016 ^{PS4} | Yes | Yes |
| Kiki Kaikai | Taito | 1986 | Jul 15, 2016 ^{PS4} Mar 12, 2020 ^{NS} | Sep 14, 2016 ^{PS4} Mar 12, 2020 ^{NS} | Mar 12, 2020 ^{NS} | Jul 15, 2016 ^{PS4} | Yes | Yes |
| King & Balloon | Namco | 1980 | Jul 20, 2023 | Jul 20, 2023 | Jul 20, 2023 | Jul 20, 2023 ^{PS4} | Yes | Yes |
| Kitten Kaboodle | Konami | 1988 | Feb 13, 2025 | Feb 13, 2025 | Feb 13, 2025 | Feb 13, 2025 ^{PS4} | Yes | Yes |
| Knuckle Heads | Namco | 1992 | Aug 15, 2024 | Aug 15, 2024 | Aug 15, 2024 | Aug 15, 2024 ^{PS4} | Yes | Yes |
| Konami GT | Konami | 1985 | Apr 16, 2026 | Apr 16, 2026 | Apr 16, 2026 | Apr 16, 2026 ^{PS4} | Yes | Yes |
| Konami's Ping Pong (Konami's Table Tennis) | Konami | 1985 | Nov 14, 2024 | Nov 14, 2024 | Nov 14, 2024 | Nov 14, 2024 ^{PS4} | Yes | Yes |
| Koutetsu Yousai Strahl | UPL | 1992 | Jul 22, 2020 | Jul 22, 2020 ^{NS} | Jul 22, 2020 | Jul 22, 2020 ^{PS4} | Yes | Yes |
| Kurikinton | Taito | 1988 | Aug 13, 2021 | Aug 13, 2021 | Aug 13, 2021 | Aug 13, 2021 ^{PS4} | Yes | Yes |
| Labyrinth Runner | Konami | 1987 | Jan 22, 2026 | Jan 22, 2026 | Jan 22, 2026 | Jan 22, 2026 ^{PS4} | Yes | Yes |
| Lady Bug | Universal | 1981 | Jul 2, 2026 | Jul 2, 2026 | Jul 2, 2026 | Jul 2, 2026 ^{PS4} | Yes | Yes |
| Land Sea Air Squad | Taito | 1986 | Mar 27, 2025 | Mar 27, 2025 | Mar 27, 2025 | Mar 27, 2025 ^{PS4} | Yes | Yes |
| Lead Angle | Seibu Kaihatsu | 1988 | Sep 5, 2024 | Sep 5, 2024 | Sep 5, 2024 | Sep 5, 2024 ^{PS4} | Yes | Yes |
| The Legend of Kage | Taito | 1985 | Oct 2, 2015 ^{PS4} Oct 10, 2019 ^{NS} | Dec 1, 2015 ^{PS4} Oct 10, 2019 ^{NS} | Feb 16, 2016 ^{PS4} Oct 10, 2019 ^{NS} | Apr 8, 2016 ^{PS4} | Yes | Yes |
| Legend of Makai | Jaleco | 1988 | Mar 4, 2021 | Mar 4, 2021 | Mar 4, 2021 | Unreleased | Yes | Yes |
| The Legend of Valkyrie | Namco | 1989 | Apr 14, 2022 | Apr 14, 2022 | Apr 14, 2022 | Apr 14, 2022 ^{PS4} | Yes | Yes |
| Legion | Nichibutsu | 1987 | May 23, 2024 | May 23, 2024 | May 23, 2024 | May 23, 2024 ^{PS4} | Yes | Yes |
| Libble Rabble | Namco | 1983 | Nov 11, 2021 | Nov 11, 2021 | Nov 11, 2021 | Nov 11, 2021 ^{PS4} | Yes | Yes |
| Lightning Fighters (Trigon) | Konami | 1990 | Aug 20, 2020 | Aug 20, 2020 | Aug 20, 2020 | Aug 20, 2020 ^{PS4} | Yes | Yes |
| Liquid Kids | Taito | 1990 | Dec 2, 2021 | Dec 2, 2021 | Dec 2, 2021 | Dec 2, 2021 ^{PS4} | Yes | Yes |
| Mach Breakers | Namco | 1995 | Sep 4, 2025 | Sep 4, 2025 | Sep 4, 2025 | Sep 4, 2025 ^{PS4} | Yes | Yes |
| Mad Shark | Allumer | 1993 | Aug 10, 2023 | Aug 10, 2023 | Aug 10, 2023 | Aug 10, 2023 ^{PS4} | Yes | Yes |
| Magical Speed | Allumer | 1994 | Feb 9, 2023 | Feb 9, 2023 | Feb 9, 2023 | Feb 9, 2023 ^{PS4} | Yes | Yes |
| MagMax | Nichibutsu | 1985 | Apr 2, 2015 ^{PS4} May 7, 2020 ^{NS} | Jul 21, 2015 ^{PS4} May 7, 2020 ^{NS} | Dec 2, 2015 ^{PS4} May 7, 2020 ^{NS} | Jun 5, 2015 ^{PS4} | Yes | Yes |
| Mappy | Namco | 1983 | Oct 21, 2021 | Oct 21, 2021 | Oct 21, 2021 | Oct 21, 2021 ^{PS4} | Yes | Yes |
| Märchen Maze | Namco | 1988 | Feb 6, 2025 | Feb 6, 2025 | Feb 6, 2025 | Feb 6, 2025 ^{PS4} | Yes | Yes |
| Mario Bros. | Nintendo | 1983 | Sep 27, 2017 | Sep 27, 2017 | Sep 27, 2017 | Unreleased | Yes | No |
| Markham | Sunsoft | 1983 | Dec 10, 2020 ^{NS} Dec 17, 2020 ^{PS4} | Dec 10, 2020 ^{NS} Dec 17, 2020 ^{PS4} | Dec 10, 2020 ^{NS} Dec 17, 2020 ^{PS4} | Dec 17, 2020 ^{PS4} | Yes | Yes |
| Marvel Land | Namco | 1989 | Dec 15, 2022 | Unreleased | Unreleased | Unreleased | Yes | Yes |
| Master of Weapon | Taito | 1989 | Feb 15, 2024 | Feb 15, 2024 | Feb 15, 2024 | Feb 15, 2024 ^{PS4} | Yes | Yes |
| Mat Mania Exciting Hour | Technōs Japan | 1985 | Jun 12, 2014 ^{PS4} Dec 19, 2019 ^{NS} | Mar 24, 2015 ^{PS4} Dec 19, 2019 ^{NS} | Aug 24, 2015 ^{PS4} Dec 19, 2019 ^{NS} | May 21, 2015 ^{PS4} | Yes | Yes |
| Mazinger Z | Banpresto | 1994 | May 11, 2023 | May 11, 2023 | May 11, 2023 | May 11, 2023 ^{PS4} | Yes | Yes |
| Mega Zone | Konami | 1983 | Feb 12, 2026 | Feb 12, 2026 | Feb 12, 2026 | Feb 12, 2026 ^{PS4} | Yes | Yes |
| MegaBlast | Taito | 1989 | Jun 15, 2023 | Jun 15, 2023 | Jun 15, 2023 | Jun 15, 2023 ^{PS4} | Yes | Yes |
| Metal Black | Taito | 1991 | Nov 17, 2022 | Nov 17, 2022 | Nov 17, 2022 | Nov 17, 2022 ^{PS4} | Yes | Yes |
| Metal Hawk | Namco | 1988 | Dec 22, 2022 | Dec 22, 2022 | Dec 22, 2022 | Dec 22, 2022 ^{PS4} | Yes | Yes |
| Metamorphic Force | Konami | 1993 | Oct 24, 2024 | Oct 24, 2024 | Oct 24, 2024 | Oct 24, 2024 ^{PS4} | Yes | Yes |
| Metro-Cross | Namco | 1985 | Aug 18, 2022 | Aug 18, 2022 | Unreleased | Aug 18, 2022 ^{PS4} | Yes | Yes |
| Midnight Landing | Taito | 1987 | Oct 23, 2025 | Oct 23, 2025 | Oct 23, 2025 | Oct 23, 2025 ^{PS4} | Yes | Yes |
| Mighty Guy | Nichibutsu | 1986 | Jan 4, 2024 | Jan 4, 2024 | Jan 4, 2024 | Jan 4, 2024 ^{PS4} | Yes | Yes |
| Mirai Ninja | Namco | 1988 | Dec 16, 2021 | Dec 16, 2021 | Dec 16, 2021 | Dec 16, 2021 ^{PS4} | Yes | Yes |
| Moon Cresta | Nichibutsu | 1980 | Aug 26, 2014 ^{PS4} Jan 31, 2019 ^{NS} | May 29, 2015 ^{PS4} Jan 31, 2019 ^{NS} | Sep 29, 2015 ^{PS4} Jan 31, 2019 ^{NS} | Jun 12, 2015 ^{PS4} | Yes | Yes |
| Moon Patrol | Irem | 1982 | Mar 22, 2018 | Mar 22, 2018 ^{NS} Jun 12, 2018 ^{PS4} | Mar 22, 2018 ^{NS} Jun 22, 2018 ^{PS4} | Mar 22, 2018 ^{PS4} | Yes | Yes |
| Moon Shuttle | Nichibutsu | 1981 | Oct 3, 2024 | Oct 3, 2024 | Oct 3, 2024 | Oct 3, 2024 ^{PS4} | Yes | Yes |
| Motos | Namco | 1985 | Jun 9, 2022 | Jun 9, 2022 | Jun 9, 2022 | Jun 9, 2022 ^{PS4} | Yes | Yes |
| Mouser | UPL | 1983 | Mar 14, 2024 | Mar 14, 2024 | Mar 14, 2024 | Mar 14, 2024 ^{PS4} | Yes | Yes |
| Mr. Do! | Universal | 1982 | May 15, 2026 | May 15, 2026 | May 15, 2026 | May 15, 2026 ^{PS4} | Yes | Yes |
| Mr. Do's Castle | Universal | 1983 | Sep 17, 2026 | Sep 17, 2026 | Sep 17, 2026 | Sep 17, 2026 ^{PS4} | Yes | Yes |
| Mr. Goemon | Konami | 1986 | Dec 25, 2014 ^{PS4} Oct 31, 2019 ^{NS} | Sep 22, 2015 ^{PS4} Oct 31, 2019 ^{NS} | Oct 27, 2015 ^{PS4} Oct 31, 2019 ^{NS} | May 28, 2015 ^{PS4} | Yes | Yes |
| Munch Mobile (Joyful Road) | SNK | 1983 | Oct 16, 2025 | Oct 16, 2025 | Oct 16, 2025 | Oct 16, 2025 ^{PS4} | Yes | Yes |
| Mutant Night | UPL | 1987 | Feb 16, 2017 ^{PS4} Dec 30, 2021 ^{NS} | Dec 30, 2021 | Dec 30, 2021 | Feb 20, 2017 ^{PS4} | Yes | Yes |
| MX5000 (Flak Attack) | Konami | 1987 | Mar 25, 2016 ^{PS4} Apr 9, 2020 ^{NS} | Jul 26, 2016 ^{PS4} Apr 9, 2020 ^{NS} | Jul 26, 2016 ^{PS4} Apr 9, 2020 ^{NS} | Mar 25, 2016 ^{PS4} | Yes | Yes |
| Mystic Warriors | Konami | 1993 | Dec 21, 2023 | Dec 21, 2023 | Dec 21, 2023 | Dec 21, 2023 ^{PS4} | Yes | Yes |
| Naughty Boy | Jaleco | 1982 | Jun 4, 2020 ^{NS} Jun 18, 2020 ^{PS4} | Jun 4, 2020 ^{NS} Jun 18, 2020 ^{PS4} | Jun 4, 2020 ^{NS} Jun 18, 2020 ^{PS4} | Unreleased | Yes | Yes |
| Navarone | Namco | 1980 | Mar 30, 2023 | Mar 30, 2023 | Mar 30, 2023 | Mar 30, 2023 ^{PS4} | Yes | Yes |
| NebulasRay | Namco | 1994 | May 15, 2025 | May 15, 2025 | May 15, 2025 | May 15, 2025 ^{PS4} | Yes | Yes |
| New Rally-X | Namco | 1981 | Feb 3, 2022 | Feb 3, 2022 | Feb 3, 2022 | Feb 3, 2022 ^{PS4} | Yes | Yes |
| The NewZealand Story | Taito | 1988 | Jan 26, 2023 | Jan 26, 2023 | Jan 26, 2023 | Jan 26, 2023 ^{PS4} | Yes | Yes |
| Ninja Emaki | Nichibutsu | 1986 | Jul 4, 2024 | Jul 4, 2024 | Jul 4, 2024 | Jul 4, 2024 ^{PS4} | Yes | Yes |
| Ninja Gaiden | Tecmo | 1988 | May 9, 2019 | May 9, 2019 | May 9, 2019 ^{NS} | May 9, 2019 ^{PS4} | Yes | Yes |
| Ninja Kazan | Jaleco | 1988 | Feb 4, 2021 | Feb 4, 2021 | Feb 4, 2021 ^{NS} | Unreleased | Yes | Yes |
| Ninja-Kid | UPL | 1984 | May 15, 2014 ^{PS4} Apr 5, 2018 ^{NS} | May 26, 2015 ^{PS4} Apr 5, 2018 ^{NS} | Jul 7, 2015 ^{PS4} Apr 5, 2018 ^{NS} | May 14, 2015 ^{PS4} | Yes | Yes |
| Ninja-Kid II | UPL | 1987 | Jun 5, 2015 ^{PS4} Oct 18, 2018 ^{NS} | Oct 27, 2015 ^{PS4} Oct 18, 2018 ^{NS} | Jan 26, 2016 ^{PS4} Oct 22, 2018 ^{NS} | Sep 3, 2015 ^{PS4} | Yes | Yes |
| The Ninja Kids | Taito | 1990 | Aug 22, 2024 | Aug 22, 2024 | Aug 22, 2024 | Aug 22, 2024 ^{PS4} | Yes | Yes |
| Ninja Spirit | Irem | 1988 | Jul 4, 2019 | Jul 4, 2019 ^{NS} Jul 8, 2019 ^{PS4} | Jul 4, 2019 ^{NS} | Jul 4, 2019 ^{PS4} | Yes | Yes |
| The Ninja Warriors | Taito | 1987 | Sep 7, 2017 ^{PS4} Jul 18, 2019 ^{NS} | Sep 7, 2017 ^{PS4} Jul 18, 2019 ^{NS} | Sep 7, 2017 ^{PS4} Jul 18, 2019 ^{NS} | Sep 7, 2017 ^{PS4} | Yes | Yes |
| Nova 2001 | UPL | 1983 | Sep 25, 2014 ^{PS4} Jul 29, 2021 ^{NS} | Jun 16, 2015 ^{PS4} Jul 29, 2021 ^{NS} | Nov 3, 2015 ^{PS4} Jul 29, 2021 ^{NS} | Jun 25, 2015 ^{PS4} | Yes | Yes |
| Numan Athletics | Namco | 1993 | Apr 25, 2024 | Apr 25, 2024 | Apr 25, 2024 | Apr 25, 2024 ^{PS4} | Yes | Yes |
| Omega Fighter | UPL | 1989 | Jul 26, 2018 | Jul 26, 2018 ^{NS} Apr 4, 2019 ^{PS4} | Jul 26, 2018 ^{NS} | Jul 26, 2018 ^{PS4} | Yes | Yes |
| Ordyne | Namco | 1988 | Oct 27, 2022 | Oct 27, 2022 | Oct 27, 2022 | Oct 27, 2022 ^{PS4} | Yes | Yes |
| Othello | Success | 1984 | Feb 20, 2025 | Feb 20, 2025 | Feb 20, 2025 | Feb 20, 2025 ^{PS4} | Yes | Yes |
| The Outfoxies | Namco | 1995 | Dec 18, 2025 | Dec 18, 2025 | Dec 18, 2025 | Dec 18, 2025 ^{PS4} | Yes | Yes |
| P-47: The Phantom Fighter | Jaleco | 1988 | Jul 2, 2020 | Jul 2, 2020 | Jul 2, 2020 | Unreleased | Yes | Yes |
| P.O.W.: Prisoners of War | SNK | 1988 | Mar 5, 2020 | Mar 5, 2020 ^{NS} Mar 11, 2020 ^{PS4} | Mar 5, 2020 ^{NS} Mar 10, 2020 ^{PS4} | Mar 5, 2020 ^{PS4} | Yes | Yes |
| Pac & Pal | Namco | 1983 | Sep 1, 2022 | Sep 1, 2022 | Sep 1, 2022 | Sep 1, 2022 ^{PS4} | Yes | Yes |
| Pac-Land | Namco | 1984 | Apr 7, 2022 | Apr 7, 2022 | Apr 7, 2022 | Apr 7, 2022 ^{PS4} | Yes | Yes |
| Pac-Man | Namco | 1980 | Sep 24, 2021 ^{NS} Oct 7, 2021 ^{PS4} | Sep 23, 2021 ^{NS} Oct 7, 2021 ^{PS4} | Sep 24, 2021 ^{NS} Oct 7, 2021 ^{PS4} | Oct 7, 2021 ^{PS4} | Yes | Yes |
| Pac-Mania | Namco | 1987 | Dec 8, 2022 | Dec 8, 2022 | Dec 8, 2022 | Dec 8, 2022 ^{PS4} | Yes | Yes |
| Penguin-kun Wars | UPL | 1985 | Jan 2, 2020 ^{NS} Jan 9, 2020 ^{PS4} | Jan 2, 2020 ^{NS} Jan 9, 2020 ^{PS4} | Jan 2, 2020 ^{NS} Jan 9, 2020 ^{PS4} | Jan 9, 2020 ^{PS4} | Yes | Yes |
| Pettan Pyuu | Sunsoft | 1984 | Nov 5, 2020 | Nov 5, 2020 | Nov 5, 2020 | Nov 5, 2020 ^{PS4} | Yes | Yes |
| Phelios | Namco | 1989 | Feb 2, 2023 | Feb 2, 2023 | Feb 2, 2023 | Feb 2, 2023 ^{PS4} | Yes | Yes |
| Phozon | Namco | 1983 | Nov 25, 2021 | Nov 25, 2021 | Nov 25, 2021 | Nov 25, 2021 ^{PS4} | Yes | Yes |
| Pinball | Nintendo | 1984 | Aug 30, 2019 | Aug 30, 2019 | Aug 30, 2019 | Unreleased | Yes | No |
| Pinball Action | Tehkan | 1985 | Apr 24, 2025 | Apr 24, 2025 | Apr 24, 2025 | Apr 24, 2025 ^{PS4} | Yes | Yes |
| Pirate Pete | Taito | 1982 | Jun 10, 2021 | Jun 10, 2021 | Jun 10, 2021 | Jun 10, 2021 ^{PS4} | Yes | Yes |
| Pistol Daimyo no Bōken | Namco | 1990 | Jan 27, 2022 | Jan 27, 2022 | Jan 27, 2022 | Jan 27, 2022 ^{PS4} | Yes | Yes |
| Plump Pop | Taito | 1987 | Mar 5, 2026 | Mar 5, 2026 | Mar 5, 2026 | Mar 5, 2026 ^{PS4} | Yes | Yes |
| Plus Alpha | Jaleco | 1989 | Apr 16, 2020 ^{NS} Apr 30, 2020 ^{PS4} | Apr 16, 2020 ^{NS} May 15, 2020 ^{PS4} | Apr 16, 2020 ^{NS} May 24, 2020 ^{PS4} | Unreleased | Yes | Yes |
| Polaris | Taito | 1980 | Apr 9, 2026 | Apr 9, 2026 | Apr 9, 2026 | Apr 9, 2026 ^{PS4} | Yes | Yes |
| Pole Position | Namco | 1982 | Jul 6, 2023 | Jul 6, 2023 | Jul 6, 2023 | Jul 6, 2023 ^{PS4} | Yes | Yes |
| Pole Position II | Namco | 1983 | Dec 7, 2023 | Dec 7, 2023 | Dec 7, 2023 | Dec 7, 2023 ^{PS4} | Yes | Yes |
| Pooyan | Konami | 1982 | Jun 13, 2019 | Jun 13, 2019 | Jun 13, 2019 ^{NS} Jul 30, 2019 ^{PS4} | Jun 13, 2019 ^{PS4} | Yes | Yes |
| Pop Flamer | Jaleco | 1982 | Sep 9, 2021 | Sep 9, 2021 | Sep 9, 2021 | Unreleased | Yes | Yes |
| Power Spikes | Video System | 1991 | Oct 10, 2024 | Oct 10, 2024 | Oct 10, 2024 | Oct 10, 2024 ^{PS4} | Yes | Yes |
| Prehistoric Isle | SNK | 1989 | Oct 29, 2026 | Oct 29, 2026 | Oct 29, 2026 | Oct 29, 2026 ^{PS4} | Yes | Yes |
| Pro Tennis: World Court | Namco | 1988 | May 12, 2022 | May 12, 2022 | May 12, 2022 | May 12, 2022 ^{PS4} | Yes | Yes |
| Psycho Soldier | SNK | 1987 | Apr 25, 2019 | Apr 25, 2019 | Apr 25, 2019 ^{NS} | Apr 25, 2019 ^{PS4} | Yes | Yes |
| Punch-Out!! | Nintendo | 1984 | Mar 30, 2018 | Mar 30, 2018 | Mar 30, 2018 | Unreleased | Yes | No |
| Punk Shot | Konami | 1990 | May 8, 2025 | May 8, 2025 | May 8, 2025 | May 8, 2025 ^{PS4} | Yes | Yes |
| Qix | Taito | 1981 | Mar 10, 2022 | Mar 10, 2022 | Mar 10, 2022 | Mar 10, 2022 ^{PS4} | Yes | Yes |
| Quester | Namco | 1987 | Jan 29, 2026 | Jan 29, 2026 | Jan 29, 2026 | Jan 29, 2026 ^{PS4} | Yes | Yes |
| Rabio Lepus | Video System | 1987 | Jul 7, 2022 | Jul 7, 2022 | Jul 7, 2022 | Jul 7, 2022 ^{PS4} | Yes | Yes |
| Rack 'Em Up | Konami | 1987 | Jun 11, 2026 | Jun 11, 2026 | Jun 11, 2026 | Jun 11, 2026 ^{PS4} | Yes | Yes |
| Radical Radial | Nichibutsu | 1982 | May 14, 2020 ^{NS} May 28, 2020 ^{PS4} | May 14, 2020 ^{NS} May 28, 2020 ^{PS4} | May 14, 2020 ^{NS} May 28, 2020 ^{PS4} | May 28, 2020 ^{PS4} | Yes | Yes |
| Raiden | Seibu Kaihatsu | 1990 | Jul 1, 2021 | Jul 1, 2021 | Jul 1, 2021 | Jul 1, 2021 ^{PS4} | Yes | Yes |
| Raiders5 | UPL | 1985 | Dec 18, 2014 ^{PS4} May 21, 2020 ^{NS} | Jun 23, 2015 ^{PS4} May 21, 2020 ^{NS} | May 21, 2020 ^{NS} | Jul 16, 2015 ^{PS4} | Yes | Yes |
| Raimais | Taito | 1988 | Nov 18, 2021 | Nov 18, 2021 | Nov 18, 2021 | Nov 18, 2021 ^{PS4} | Yes | Yes |
| Rainbow Islands | Taito | 1987 | Jan 25, 2024 | Jan 25, 2024 | Jan 25, 2024 | Jan 25, 2024 ^{PS4} | Yes | Yes |
| Rally-X | Namco | 1980 | Oct 14, 2021 | Oct 14, 2021 | Oct 14, 2021 | Oct 14, 2021 ^{PS4} | Yes | Yes |
| Rastan Saga | Taito | 1987 | May 2, 2024 | May 2, 2024 | May 2, 2024 | May 2, 2024 ^{PS4} | Yes | Yes |
| Rastan Saga II | Taito | 1988 | Jun 20, 2024 | Jun 20, 2024 | Jun 20, 2024 | Jun 20, 2024 ^{PS4} | Yes | Yes |
| Rave Racer | Namco | 1995 | Feb 26, 2026 | Feb 26, 2026 | Feb 26, 2026 | Feb 26, 2026 ^{PS4} | Yes | Yes |
| Renegade | Technōs Japan | 1986 | Jul 24, 2014 ^{PS4} Jun 28, 2018 ^{NS} | Jun 2, 2015 ^{PS4} Jun 28, 2018 ^{NS} | Jun 30, 2015 ^{PS4} Jun 28, 2018 ^{NS} | May 28, 2015 ^{PS4} | Yes | Yes |
| The Return of Ishtar | Namco | 1986 | Sep 22, 2022 | Sep 22, 2022 | Sep 22, 2022 | Sep 22, 2022 ^{PS4} | Yes | Yes |
| Rezon | Allumer | 1991 | Apr 6, 2023 | Apr 6, 2023 | Apr 6, 2023 | Apr 6, 2023 ^{PS4} | Yes | Yes |
| Ridge Racer | Namco | 1993 | Jun 5, 2025 | Jun 5, 2025 | Jun 5, 2025 | Jun 5, 2025 ^{PS4} | Yes | Yes |
| Riot | Tecmo | 1992 | Oct 31, 2024 | Oct 31, 2024 | Oct 31, 2024 | Oct 31, 2024 ^{PS4} | Yes | Yes |
| Road Fighter | Konami | 1984 | Jul 25, 2019 | Jul 25, 2019 | Jul 25, 2019 | Jul 25, 2019 ^{PS4} | Yes | Yes |
| Roc'n Rope | Konami | 1983 | Dec 11, 2025 | Dec 11, 2025 | Dec 11, 2025 | Dec 11, 2025 ^{PS4} | Yes | Yes |
| Rod Land | Jaleco | 1990 | Jan 7, 2021 | Jan 7, 2021 | Jan 7, 2021 | Unreleased | Yes | Yes |
| Roller Jammer | Nichibutsu | 1984 | Jul 28, 2022 | Jul 28, 2022 | Jul 28, 2022 | Jul 28, 2022 ^{PS4} | Yes | Yes |
| Rolling Thunder | Namco | 1986 | Mar 17, 2022 | Mar 17, 2022 | Mar 17, 2022 | Mar 17, 2022 ^{PS4} | Yes | Yes |
| Rolling Thunder 2 | Namco | 1991 | May 25, 2023 | May 25, 2023 | May 25, 2023 | May 25, 2023 ^{PS4} | Yes | Yes |
| Rompers | Namco | 1989 | Sep 15, 2022 | Sep 15, 2022 | Sep 15, 2022 | Sep 15, 2022 ^{PS4} | Yes | Yes |
| Route-16 | Sunsoft | 1981 | Nov 29, 2018 | Nov 29, 2018 ^{NS} Jul 16, 2019 ^{PS4} | Nov 29, 2018 ^{NS} | Nov 29, 2018 ^{PS4} | Yes | Yes |
| Rush'n Attack | Konami | 1985 | Nov 26, 2020 | Nov 26, 2020 | Nov 26, 2020 | Nov 26, 2020 ^{PS4} | Yes | Yes |
| Rygar | Tecmo | 1986 | May 15, 2014 ^{PS4} Sep 13, 2018 ^{NS} | Aug 19, 2014 ^{PS4} Sep 13, 2018 ^{NS} | Sep 13, 2018 ^{NS} | Unreleased | Yes | Yes |
| Ryukyu | Success | 1990 | May 22, 2025 | May 22, 2025 | May 22, 2025 | May 22, 2025 ^{PS4} | Yes | Yes |
| Saboten Bombers | NMK | 1992 | Apr 8, 2021 | Apr 8, 2021 | Apr 8, 2021 | Apr 8, 2021 ^{PS4} | Yes | Yes |
| Saint Dragon | Jaleco | 1989 | Feb 6, 2020 | Feb 6, 2020 | Feb 6, 2020 | Unreleased | Yes | Yes |
| Salamander (Life Force) | Konami | 1986 | Nov 27, 2015 ^{PS4} Feb 27, 2020 ^{NS} | Mar 29, 2016 ^{PS4} Feb 27, 2020 ^{NS} | Apr 26, 2016 ^{PS4} Feb 27, 2020 ^{NS} | Feb 23, 2016 ^{PS4} | Yes | Yes |
| Sasuke vs. Commander | SNK | 1980 | Feb 13, 2020 | Feb 13, 2020 | Feb 13, 2020 | Feb 13, 2020 ^{PS4} | Yes | Yes |
| Satan of Saturn | SNK | 1981 | Aug 27, 2026 | Aug 27, 2026 | Aug 27, 2026 | Aug 27, 2026 ^{PS4} | Yes | Yes |
| Scion | Seibu Kaihatsu | 1984 | Oct 30, 2025 | Oct 30, 2025 | Oct 30, 2025 | Oct 30, 2025 ^{PS4} | Yes | Yes |
| Scramble | Konami | 1981 | Dec 25, 2014 ^{PS4} Sep 26, 2019 ^{NS} | Jun 30, 2015 ^{PS4} Sep 26, 2019 ^{NS} | Unreleased | Jul 9, 2015 ^{PS4} | Yes | Yes |
| Scramble Formation (Tokio) | Taito | 1986 | Nov 30, 2023 | Nov 30, 2023 | Nov 30, 2023 | Nov 30, 2023 ^{PS4} | Yes | Yes |
| Scrambled Egg | Technōs Japan | 1983 | Aug 28, 2025 | Aug 28, 2025 | Aug 28, 2025 | Aug 28, 2025 ^{PS4} | Yes | Yes |
| Sea Fighter Poseidon | Taito | 1984 | Jul 8, 2021 | Jul 8, 2021 | Jul 8, 2021 | Jul 8, 2021 ^{PS4} | Yes | Yes |
| Seicross | Nichibutsu | 1984 | Jun 17, 2021 | Jun 17, 2021 | Jun 17, 2021 | Jun 17, 2021 ^{PS4} | Yes | Yes |
| Senjyo | Tehkan | 1983 | Jan 12, 2023 | Jan 12, 2023 | Jan 12, 2023 | Jan 12, 2023 ^{PS4} | Yes | Yes |
| Senkyu | Seibu Kaihatsu | 1995 | Mar 21, 2025 | Mar 21, 2025 | Mar 21, 2025 | Mar 21, 2025 ^{PS4} | Yes | Yes |
| Shanghai III | Sunsoft | 1993 | Jul 3, 2015 ^{PS4} Dec 31, 2020 ^{NS} | Nov 24, 2015 ^{PS4} Dec 31, 2020 ^{NS} | Jun 2, 2016 ^{PS4} Dec 31, 2020 ^{NS} | Sep 10, 2015 ^{PS4} | Yes | Yes |
| Shao-lin's Road | Konami | 1985 | Nov 9, 2023 | Nov 9, 2023 | Nov 9, 2023 | Nov 9, 2023 ^{PS4} | Yes | Yes |
| Shingen Samurai-Fighter (Takeda Shingen) | Jaleco | 1988 | Jun 24, 2021 | Jun 24, 2021 | Jun 24, 2021 | Unreleased | Yes | Yes |
| Shot Rider | Seibu Kaihatsu | 1985 | Nov 12, 2026 | Nov 12, 2026 | Nov 12, 2026 | Nov 12, 2026 ^{PS4} | Yes | Yes |
| Shusse Ōzumō | Technōs Japan | 1984 | Jan 22, 2015 ^{PS4} Jul 11, 2019 ^{NS} | Sep 30, 2015 ^{PS4} Jul 11, 2019 ^{NS} | Jul 19, 2016 ^{PS4} Jul 11, 2019 ^{NS} | Jul 24, 2015 ^{PS4} | Yes | Yes |
| Silk Worm | Tecmo | 1988 | Feb 1, 2024 | Feb 1, 2024 | Feb 1, 2024 | Feb 1, 2024 ^{PS4} | Yes | Yes |
| Sky Kid | Namco | 1985 | Oct 28, 2021 | Oct 28, 2021 | Oct 28, 2021 | Oct 28, 2021 ^{PS4} | Yes | Yes |
| Sky Kid Deluxe | Namco | 1986 | Mar 2, 2023 | Mar 2, 2023 | Mar 2, 2023 | Mar 2, 2023 ^{PS4} | Yes | Yes |
| Sky Skipper | Nintendo | 1981 | Jul 20, 2018 | Jul 20, 2018 | Jul 20, 2018 | Unreleased | Yes | No |
| Soldam | Jaleco | 1992 | Sep 16, 2021 | Sep 16, 2021 | Sep 16, 2021 | Unreleased | Yes | Yes |
| Soldier Girl Amazon | Nichibutsu | 1986 | Mar 11, 2016 ^{PS4} Jun 23, 2022 ^{NS} | Aug 9, 2016 ^{PS4} Jun 23, 2022 ^{NS} | Sep 20, 2016 ^{PS4} Jun 23, 2022 ^{NS} | Mar 11, 2016 ^{PS4} | Yes | Yes |
| Solitary Fighter | Taito | 1991 | Dec 28, 2023 | Dec 28, 2023 | Dec 28, 2023 | Dec 28, 2023 ^{PS4} | Yes | Yes |
| Solomon's Key | Tecmo | 1986 | Sep 4, 2014 ^{PS4} Jun 6, 2019 ^{NS} | Sep 15, 2015 ^{PS4} Jun 6, 2019 ^{NS} | Jun 6, 2019 ^{NS} | Unreleased | Yes | Yes |
| Space Cruiser | Taito | 1981 | Aug 26, 2021 | Aug 26, 2021 | Aug 26, 2021 | Aug 26, 2021 ^{PS4} | Yes | Yes |
| Space Cyclone | Taito | 1980 | Jun 18, 2026 | Jun 18, 2026 | Jun 18, 2026 | Jun 18, 2026 ^{PS4} | Yes | Yes |
| Space Invaders | Taito | 1978 | Dec 25, 2025 | Dec 25, 2025 | Dec 25, 2025 | Dec 25, 2025 ^{PS4} | Yes | Yes |
| Space Invaders Part II | Taito | 1979 | Jan 1, 2026 | Jan 1, 2026 | Jan 1, 2026 | Jan 1, 2026 ^{PS4} | Yes | Yes |
| Space Seeker | Taito | 1981 | Jun 16, 2022 | Jun 16, 2022 | Jun 16, 2022 | Jun 16, 2022 ^{PS4} | Yes | Yes |
| Spinal Breakers | Video System | 1990 | Jun 12, 2025 | Jun 12, 2025 | Jun 12, 2025 | Jun 12, 2025 ^{PS4} | Yes | Yes |
| Splatterhouse | Namco | 1988 | Jun 22, 2023 | Jun 22, 2023 | Jun 22, 2023 | Jun 22, 2023 ^{PS4} | Yes | Yes |
| Star Force | Tehkan | 1984 | Sep 4, 2015 ^{PS4} Mar 1, 2018 ^{NS} | Mar 1, 2018 ^{NS} | Mar 1, 2018 ^{NS} | Unreleased | Yes | Yes |
| Steel Worker | Taito | 1980 | Sep 18, 2025 | Sep 18, 2025 | Sep 18, 2025 | Sep 18, 2025 ^{PS4} | Yes | Yes |
| Stinger | Seibu Kaihatsu | 1983 | Jul 24, 2025 | Jul 24, 2025 | Jul 24, 2025 | Jul 24, 2025 ^{PS4} | Yes | Yes |
| Strategy X | Konami | 1981 | Jun 19, 2025 | Jun 19, 2025 | Jun 19, 2025 | Jun 19, 2025 ^{PS4} | Yes | Yes |
| Strato Fighter | Tecmo | 1991 | Jul 13, 2023 | Jul 13, 2023 | Jul 13, 2023 | Jul 13, 2023 ^{PS4} | Yes | Yes |
| Street Smart | SNK | 1989 | Apr 23, 2026 | Apr 23, 2026 | Apr 23, 2026 | Apr 23, 2026 ^{PS4} | Yes | Yes |
| Strike Gunner S.T.G | Athena | 1991 | Sep 21, 2023 | Sep 21, 2023 | Sep 21, 2023 | Sep 21, 2023 ^{PS4} | Yes | Yes |
| Sunset Riders | Konami | 1991 | Jun 11, 2020 | Jun 11, 2020 | Jun 11, 2020 | Jun 11, 2020 ^{PS4} | Yes | Yes |
| Super Basketball | Konami | 1984 | Jul 17, 2025 | Jul 17, 2025 | Jul 17, 2025 | Jul 17, 2025 ^{PS4} | Yes | Yes |
| Super Cobra | Konami | 1981 | Oct 15, 2020 | Oct 15, 2020 ^{NS} Oct 22, 2020 ^{PS4} | Oct 15, 2020 ^{NS} Oct 22, 2020 ^{PS4} | Oct 15, 2020 ^{PS4} | Yes | Yes |
| Super Contra | Konami | 1988 | Jan 18, 2024 | Jan 18, 2024 | Jan 18, 2024 | Jan 18, 2024 ^{PS4} | Yes | Yes |
| Super Dimension Fortress Macross II | Banpresto | 1993 | Jul 10, 2025 | Jul 10, 2025 | Jul 10, 2025 | Jul 10, 2025 ^{PS4} | Yes | Yes |
| Super Dodge Ball | Technōs Japan | 1987 | Jul 31, 2015 ^{PS4} Aug 27, 2020 ^{NS} | Nov 10, 2015 ^{PS4} Aug 27, 2020 ^{NS} | Jan 12, 2016 ^{PS4} Aug 27, 2020 ^{NS} | Mar 18, 2016 ^{PS4} | Yes | Yes |
| Super Pac-Man | Namco | 1982 | Jan 6, 2022 | Jan 6, 2022 | Jan 6, 2022 | Jan 6, 2022 ^{PS4} | Yes | Yes |
| Super Punch-Out!! | Nintendo | 1984 | Aug 14, 2020 | Aug 14, 2020 | Aug 14, 2020 | Unreleased | Yes | No |
| Super Spacefortress Macross | Banpresto | 1992 | Dec 26, 2024 | Unreleased | Unreleased | Unreleased | Yes | Yes |
| Super Volleyball | Video System | 1989 | Aug 25, 2022 | Aug 25, 2022 | Aug 25, 2022 | Aug 25, 2022 ^{PS4} | Yes | Yes |
| Super World Court | Namco | 1992 | May 29, 2025 | May 29, 2025 | May 29, 2025 | May 29, 2025 ^{PS4} | Yes | Yes |
| Super Xevious | Namco | 1984 | May 1, 2025 | May 1, 2025 | May 1, 2025 | May 1, 2025 ^{PS4} | Yes | Yes |
| Surprise Attack | Konami | 1990 | Mar 21, 2024 | Mar 21, 2024 | Mar 21, 2024 | Mar 21, 2024 ^{PS4} | Yes | Yes |
| Swimmer | Tehkan | 1982 | Mar 25, 2021 | Mar 25, 2021 | Mar 25, 2021 | Mar 25, 2021 ^{PS4} | Yes | Yes |
| Syvalion | Taito | 1988 | Jul 16, 2026 | Jul 16, 2026 | Jul 16, 2026 | Jul 16, 2026 ^{PS4} | Yes | Yes |
| Tag Team Wrestling | Technōs Japan | 1983 | May 21, 2026 | May 21, 2026 | May 21, 2026 | May 21, 2026 ^{PS4} | Yes | Yes |
| Tank Battalion | Namco | 1980 | Mar 7, 2024 | Mar 7, 2024 | Mar 7, 2024 | Mar 7, 2024 ^{PS4} | Yes | Yes |
| Tank Force | Namco | 1991 | Jan 19, 2023 | Jan 19, 2023 | Jan 19, 2023 | Jan 19, 2023 ^{PS4} | Yes | Yes |
| Task Force Harrier | UPL | 1989 | May 20, 2021 | May 20, 2021 | May 20, 2021 | May 20, 2021 ^{PS4} | Yes | Yes |
| Tatakae! Big Fighter | Nichibutsu | 1989 | Apr 17, 2025 ^{NS} Apr 19, 2025 ^{PS4} | Apr 17, 2025 ^{NS} Apr 20, 2025 ^{PS4} | Apr 17, 2025 | Apr 19, 2025 ^{PS4} | Yes | Yes |
| Tecmo Bowl | Tecmo | 1987 | Jan 30, 2020 | Jan 30, 2020 | Jan 30, 2020 | Jan 30, 2020 ^{PS4} | Yes | Yes |
| Tecmo Knight | Tecmo | 1989 | May 2, 2023 | May 2, 2023 | May 2, 2023 | May 2, 2023 ^{PS4} | Yes | Yes |
| Tecmo Stackers (Dero~n Dero Dero) | Tecmo | 1995 | Aug 8, 2024 | Aug 8, 2024 | Aug 8, 2024 | Aug 8, 2024 ^{PS4} | Yes | Yes |
| Terra Cresta | Nichibutsu | 1985 | Nov 20, 2014 ^{PS4} May 10, 2018 ^{NS} | May 19, 2015 ^{PS4} May 10, 2018 ^{NS} | Sep 15, 2015 ^{PS4} May 10, 2018 ^{NS} | May 14, 2015 ^{PS4} | Yes | Yes |
| Terra Force | Nichibutsu | 1987 | Nov 17, 2016 ^{PS4} May 2, 2019 ^{NS} | May 2, 2019 ^{NS} (Note: This game was mistakenly listed on the North American Nintendo eShop and on Nintendo.com from Apr 4, 2019, and was removed the next day.) | May 2, 2019 ^{NS} | Nov 17, 2016 ^{PS4} | Yes | Yes |
| Tetris: The Absolute – The Grand Master 2 Plus | Arika | 2000 | Jun 1, 2023 | Jun 1, 2023 | Jun 1, 2023 | Jun 1, 2023 ^{PS4} | Yes | Yes |
| Tetris: The Grand Master | Arika | 1998 | Dec 1, 2022 | Dec 1, 2022 | Dec 1, 2022 | Dec 1, 2022 ^{PS4} | Yes | Yes |
| Thunder Ceptor | Namco | 1986 | Jun 30, 2022 | Jun 30, 2022 | Jun 30, 2022 | Jun 30, 2022 ^{PS4} | Yes | Yes |
| Thunder Ceptor II | Namco | 1986 | Mar 16, 2023 | Mar 16, 2023 | Mar 16, 2023 | Mar 16, 2023 ^{PS4} | Yes | Yes |
| Thunder Cross | Konami | 1988 | Jun 8, 2017 ^{PS4} Feb 11, 2021 ^{NS} | Feb 11, 2021 ^{NS} Feb 25, 2021 ^{PS4} | Feb 11, 2021 ^{NS} Feb 26, 2021 ^{PS4} | Jun 8, 2017 ^{PS4} | Yes | Yes |
| Thunder Cross II | Konami | 1991 | Apr 28, 2021 | Apr 28, 2021 | Apr 28, 2021 | Apr 28, 2021 ^{PS4} | Yes | Yes |
| Thunder Dragon | NMK | 1991 | Mar 11, 2021 | Mar 11, 2021 | Mar 11, 2021 | Mar 11, 2021 ^{PS4} | Yes | Yes |
| Thunder Dragon 2 | NMK | 1993 | Feb 10, 2022 | Feb 10, 2022 | Feb 10, 2022 | Feb 10, 2022 ^{PS4} | Yes | Yes |
| Thunder Fox | Taito | 1990 | Jan 30, 2025 | Jan 30, 2025 | Jan 30, 2025 | Jan 30, 2025 ^{PS4} | Yes | Yes |
| Thundercade | SETA | 1987 | Oct 15, 2026 | Oct 15, 2026 | Oct 15, 2026 | Oct 15, 2026 ^{PS4} | Yes | Yes |
| Time Pilot | Konami | 1982 | Apr 11, 2019 | Apr 11, 2019 ^{NS} Apr 12, 2019 ^{PS4} | Apr 11, 2019 ^{NS} Sep 26, 2019 ^{PS4} | Apr 12, 2019 ^{PS4} | Yes | Yes |
| Time Pilot '84 | Konami | 1984 | May 27, 2021 | May 27, 2021 | May 27, 2021 | May 27, 2021 ^{PS4} | Yes | Yes |
| Time Tunnel | Taito | 1982 | Sep 19, 2019 | Sep 19, 2019 | Sep 19, 2019 ^{NS} Oct 15, 2019 ^{PS4} | Sep 19, 2019 ^{PS4} | Yes | Yes |
| The Tin Star | Taito | 1983 | Apr 2, 2020 | Apr 2, 2020 | Apr 2, 2020 ^{NS} Apr 8, 2020 ^{PS4} | Apr 2, 2020 ^{PS4} | Yes | Yes |
| Tinkle Pit | Namco | 1993 | Jul 11, 2024 | Jul 11, 2024 | Jul 11, 2024 | Jul 11, 2024 ^{PS4} | Yes | Yes |
| TNK III | SNK | 1985 | Nov 7, 2019 | Nov 7, 2019 ^{NS} Nov 25, 2019 ^{PS4} | Nov 7, 2019 ^{NS} Nov 11, 2019 ^{PS4} | Nov 7, 2019 ^{PS4} | Yes | Yes |
| Tōkidenshō Angel Eyes | Tecmo | 1996 | Oct 20, 2022 | Oct 20, 2022 | Oct 20, 2022 | Oct 20, 2022 ^{PS4} | Yes | Yes |
| Tokyo Wars | Namco | 1996 | Nov 6, 2025 | Nov 6, 2025 | Nov 6, 2025 | Nov 6, 2025 ^{PS4} | Yes | Yes |
| Top Speed (Full Throttle) | Taito | 1987 | Feb 5, 2026 | Feb 5, 2026 | Feb 5, 2026 | Feb 5, 2026 ^{PS4} | Yes | Yes |
| Touchdown Fever | SNK | 1987 | Jan 8, 2026 ^{NS} Jan 13, 2026 ^{PS4} | Jan 8, 2026 ^{NS} Jan 13, 2026 ^{PS4} | Jan 8, 2026 ^{NS} Jan 13, 2026 ^{PS4} | Jan 13, 2026 ^{PS4} | Yes | Yes |
| The Tower of Druaga | Namco | 1984 | Jun 2, 2022 | Jun 2, 2022 | Jun 2, 2022 | Jun 2, 2022 ^{PS4} | Yes | Yes |
| Toy Pop | Namco | 1986 | Oct 13, 2022 | Oct 13, 2022 | Oct 13, 2022 | Oct 13, 2022 ^{PS4} | Yes | Yes |
| Track & Field | Konami | 1983 | Sep 12, 2019 | Sep 12, 2019 | Sep 12, 2019 ^{NS} Oct 3, 2019 ^{PS4} | Sep 12, 2019 ^{PS4} | Yes | Yes |
| Traverse USA (Zippy Race) | Irem | 1983 | Nov 30, 2017 | Nov 30, 2017 ^{NS} Dec 7, 2017 ^{PS4} | Nov 30, 2017 | Nov 30, 2017 ^{PS4} | Yes | Yes |
| Trio the Punch | Data East | 1990 | May 19, 2022 | May 19, 2022 | May 19, 2022 | May 19, 2022 ^{PS4} | Yes | Yes |
| Tube Panic | Nichibutsu | 1984 | Apr 23, 2020 ^{NS} May 7, 2020 ^{PS4} | Apr 23, 2020 ^{NS} Jun 6, 2020 ^{PS4} | Apr 23, 2020 ^{NS} Jun 6, 2020 ^{PS4} | Jul 1, 2020 ^{PS4} | Yes | Yes |
| Turbo Force | Video System | 1991 | Mar 9, 2023 | Mar 9, 2023 | Mar 9, 2023 | Mar 9, 2023 ^{PS4} | Yes | Yes |
| Tutankham | Konami | 1982 | May 9, 2024 | May 9, 2024 | May 9, 2024 | May 9, 2024 ^{PS4} | Yes | Yes |
| TwinBee | Konami | 1985 | Dec 25, 2015 ^{PS4} Dec 5, 2019 ^{NS} | Feb 26, 2016 ^{PS4} Dec 5, 2019 ^{NS} | May 10, 2016 ^{PS4} Dec 5, 2019 ^{NS} | May 10, 2016 ^{PS4} | Yes | Yes |
| TX-1 | Tatsumi | 1983 | Jul 30, 2026 | Jul 30, 2026 | Jul 30, 2026 | Jul 30, 2026 ^{PS4} | Yes | Yes |
| TX-1 V8 | Tatsumi | 1984 | Nov 19, 2026 | Nov 19, 2026 | Nov 19, 2026 | Nov 19, 2026 ^{PS4} | Yes | Yes |
| Typhoon Gal | Taito | 1985 | Sep 30, 2021 | Sep 30, 2021 | Sep 30, 2021 | Sep 30, 2021 ^{PS4} | Yes | Yes |
| Urban Champion | Nintendo | 1984 | Nov 9, 2018 | Nov 9, 2018 | Nov 9, 2018 | Unreleased | Yes | No |
| USAAF Mustang | UPL | 1990 | Sep 2, 2021 | Sep 2, 2021 | Sep 2, 2021 | Sep 2, 2021 ^{PS4} | Yes | Yes |
| V'Ball | Technōs Japan | 1988 | Aug 13, 2026 | Aug 13, 2026 | Aug 13, 2026 | Aug 13, 2026 ^{PS4} | Yes | Yes |
| Vandyke | UPL | 1990 | Aug 19, 2021 | Aug 19, 2021 | Aug 19, 2021 | Aug 19, 2021 ^{PS4} | Yes | Yes |
| Vendetta (Crime Fighters 2) | Konami | 1991 | Jul 21, 2021 | Jul 21, 2021 | Jul 21, 2021 | Jul 21, 2021 ^{PS4} | Yes | Yes |
| Victory Road | SNK | 1986 | Aug 1, 2019 | Aug 1, 2019 ^{NS} Aug 2, 2019 ^{PS4} | Aug 1, 2019 | Aug 1, 2019 ^{PS4} | Yes | Yes |
| Video Hustler | Konami | 1981 | Sep 11, 2025 | Sep 11, 2025 | Sep 11, 2025 | Sep 11, 2025 ^{PS4} | Yes | Yes |
| Vigilante | Irem | 1988 | Sep 5, 2019 | Sep 5, 2019 | Sep 5, 2019 ^{NS} Dec 10, 2019 ^{PS4} | Sep 5, 2019 ^{PS4} | Yes | Yes |
| Violence Fight | Taito | 1989 | Oct 17, 2024 | Oct 17, 2024 | Oct 17, 2024 | Oct 17, 2024 ^{PS4} | Yes | Yes |
| Viper Phase 1 | Seibu Kaihatsu | 1995 | Dec 12, 2024 | Dec 12, 2024 | Dec 12, 2024 | Dec 12, 2024 ^{PS4} | Yes | Yes |
| Volfied | Taito | 1989 | Mar 28, 2024 | Mar 28, 2024 | Mar 28, 2024 | Mar 28, 2024 ^{PS4} | Yes | Yes |
| VS. The Adventure of Valkyrie: The Legend of the Key of Time | Namco | 1986 | Jul 25, 2024 | Jul 25, 2024 | Jul 25, 2024 | Jul 25, 2024 ^{PS4} | Yes | Yes |
| VS. Balloon Fight | Nintendo | 1984 | Dec 27, 2019 | Dec 27, 2019 | Dec 27, 2019 | Unreleased | Yes | No |
| VS. Baseball | Nintendo | 1984 | Jun 19, 2020 | Jun 19, 2020 | Jun 19, 2020 | Unreleased | Yes | No |
| VS. Battle City | Namco | 1985 | Sep 12, 2024 | Sep 12, 2024 | Sep 12, 2024 | Sep 12, 2024 ^{PS4} | Yes | Yes |
| VS. Castlevania | Konami | 1987 | Oct 17, 2019 | Oct 17, 2019 | Oct 17, 2019 ^{NS} Oct 21, 2019 ^{PS4} | Oct 17, 2019 ^{PS4} | Yes | Yes |
| VS. Clu Clu Land | Nintendo | 1984 | Jun 28, 2019 | Jun 28, 2019 | Jun 28, 2019 | Unreleased | Yes | No |
| VS. Family Tennis | Namco | 1987 | Jan 9, 2025 | Jan 9, 2025 | Jan 9, 2025 | Jan 9, 2025 ^{PS4} | Yes | Yes |
| VS. Gradius | Konami | 1986 | Aug 15, 2019 | Aug 15, 2019 | Aug 15, 2019 ^{NS} Aug 30, 2019 ^{PS4} | Aug 15, 2019 ^{PS4} | Yes | Yes |
| VS. Mah-Jong | Nintendo | 1984 | Feb 21, 2020 | Feb 21, 2020 | Feb 21, 2020 | Unreleased | Yes | No |
| VS. Mystery Tower | Namco | 1986 | Mar 6, 2025 | Mar 6, 2025 | Mar 6, 2025 | Mar 6, 2025 ^{PS4} | Yes | Yes |
| VS. The Quest of Ki | Namco | 1988 | Nov 7, 2024 | Nov 7, 2024 | Nov 7, 2024 | Nov 7, 2024 ^{PS4} | Yes | Yes |
| VS. Soccer | Nintendo | 1985 | Oct 23, 2020 | Oct 23, 2020 | Oct 23, 2020 | Unreleased | Yes | No |
| VS. Star Luster | Namco | 1985 | Jun 13, 2024 | Jun 13, 2024 | Jun 13, 2024 | Jun 13, 2024 ^{PS4} | Yes | Yes |
| VS. Super Mario Bros. | Nintendo | 1986 | Dec 22, 2017 | Dec 22, 2017 | Dec 22, 2017 | Unreleased | Yes | No |
| VS. Super Xevious: GAMP no Nazo (VS. Super Xevious: Mystery of GUMP) | Namco | 1986 | Apr 11, 2024 | Apr 11, 2024 | Apr 11, 2024 | Apr 11, 2024 ^{PS4} | Yes | Yes |
| VS. Tennis | Nintendo | 1984 | Dec 18, 2020 | Dec 18, 2020 | Dec 18, 2020 | Unreleased | Yes | No |
| VS. Wrecking Crew | Nintendo | 1984 | May 1, 2020 | May 1, 2020 | May 1, 2020 | Unreleased | Yes | No |
| War of Aero | Allumer | 1993 | Feb 29, 2024 | Feb 29, 2024 | Feb 29, 2024 | Feb 29, 2024 ^{PS4} | Yes | Yes |
| Warp & Warp | Namco | 1981 | Nov 22, 2023 | Nov 22, 2023 | Nov 22, 2023 | Nov 22, 2023 ^{PS4} | Yes | Yes |
| Warrior Blade | Taito | 1991 | Dec 19, 2024 | Dec 19, 2024 | Dec 19, 2024 | Dec 19, 2024 ^{PS4} | Yes | Yes |
| Water Ski | Taito | 1983 | Aug 22, 2019 | Aug 22, 2019 | Aug 22, 2019 ^{NS} Sep 10, 2019 ^{PS4} | Aug 22, 2019 ^{PS4} | Yes | Yes |
| Wild Western | Taito | 1982 | Jun 20, 2019 | Jun 20, 2019 | Jun 20, 2019 ^{NS} | Jun 20, 2019 ^{PS4} | Yes | Yes |
| Wiping (Rug Rats) | Nichibutsu | 1982 | Jun 6, 2024 | Jun 6, 2024 | Jun 6, 2024 | Jun 6, 2024 ^{PS4} | Yes | Yes |
| Wiz | Seibu Kaihatsu | 1985 | Jun 25, 2020 | Jun 25, 2020 | Jun 25, 2020 | Unreleased | Yes | Yes |
| Wonder Boy | Escape | 1986 | Jul 10, 2014 | Unreleased | Unreleased | Unreleased | No | Yes |
| Wonder Momo | Namco | 1987 | Mar 31, 2022 | Mar 31, 2022 | Mar 31, 2022 | Mar 31, 2022 ^{PS4} | Yes | Yes |
| X Multiply | Irem | 1989 | Aug 8, 2019 | Aug 8, 2019 ^{NS} Aug 9, 2019 ^{PS4} | Aug 8, 2019 | Aug 8, 2019 ^{PS4} | Yes | Yes |
| Xevious | Namco | 1982 | Sep 24, 2021 ^{NS} Oct 7, 2021 ^{PS4} | Sep 23, 2021 ^{NS} Oct 7, 2021 ^{PS4} | Sep 24, 2021 ^{NS} Oct 7, 2021 ^{PS4} | Oct 7, 2021 ^{PS4} | Yes | Yes |
| Xexex (Orius) | Konami | 1991 | Dec 23, 2021 | Dec 23, 2021 | Dec 23, 2021 | Dec 23, 2021 ^{PS4} | Yes | Yes |
| XX Mission | UPL | 1986 | Jan 23, 2020 | Jan 23, 2020 | Jan 23, 2020 ^{NS} Feb 24, 2020 ^{PS4} | Jan 23, 2020 ^{PS4} | Yes | Yes |
| Yie Ar Kung-Fu | Konami | 1985 | Nov 14, 2019 | Nov 14, 2019 ^{NS} Nov 19, 2019 ^{PS4} | Nov 14, 2019 ^{NS} Nov 22, 2019 ^{PS4} | Nov 14, 2019 ^{PS4} | Yes | Yes |
| Yōjūden (Heroic Episode) | Irem | 1986 | Feb 22, 2018 | Feb 22, 2018 ^{NS} Feb 26, 2019 ^{PS4} | Feb 22, 2018 ^{NS} | Feb 22, 2018 ^{PS4} | Yes | Yes |
| Yōkai Dōchūki | Namco | 1987 | Apr 28, 2022 | Apr 28, 2022 | Apr 28, 2022 | Apr 28, 2022 ^{PS4} | Yes | Yes |
| Zero Team | Seibu Kaihatsu | 1993 | Nov 19, 2020 | Nov 19, 2020 ^{NS} Dec 8, 2020 ^{PS4} | Nov 19, 2020 | Nov 19, 2020 ^{PS4} | Yes | Yes |
| Zing Zing Zip | Allumer | 1992 | Sep 7, 2023 | Sep 7, 2023 | Sep 7, 2023 | Sep 7, 2023 ^{PS4} | Yes | Yes |

=== Arcade Archives 2 ===
Titles in the Arcade Archives 2 series
| Title | Company | Original release | ACA2 Release date | | | | ACA2 Platforms | | | |
| Title | Company | Original release | JP | NA | EU/AU | Asia | NS2 | PS5 | XSXS | PC |
|---|---|---|---|---|---|---|---|---|---|---|
| Ace Driver | Namco | 1994 | May 28, 2026 | May 28, 2026 | May 28, 2026 | May 28, 2026 ^{PS5} | Yes | Yes | Yes | No |
| Ace Driver: Victory Lap | Namco | 1996 | Oct 22, 2026 | Oct 22, 2026 | Oct 22, 2026 | Oct 22, 2026 ^{PS5} | Yes | Yes | Yes | No |
| Adventure Canoe | Taito | 1982 | Feb 19, 2026 | Feb 19, 2026 | Feb 19, 2026 | Feb 19, 2026 ^{PS5} | Yes | Yes | Yes | No |
| Air Combat 22 | Namco | 1995 | Jul 3, 2025 | Jul 3, 2025 | Jul 3, 2025 | Jul 3, 2025 ^{PS5} | Yes | Yes | Yes | No |
| Aqua Jet | Namco | 1996 | Aug 14, 2025 | Aug 14, 2025 | Aug 14, 2025 | Aug 14, 2025 ^{PS5} | Yes | Yes | Yes | No |
| Arkanoid | Taito | 1986 | May 7, 2026 | May 7, 2026 | May 7, 2026 | May 7, 2026 ^{PS5} | Yes | Yes | Yes | No |
| Arkanoid: Revenge of Doh | Taito | 1987 | Sep 3, 2026 | Sep 3, 2026 | Sep 3, 2026 | Sep 3, 2026 ^{PS5} | Yes | Yes | Yes | No |
| Armadillo Racing | Namco | 1997 | Jul 23, 2026 | Jul 23, 2026 | Jul 23, 2026 | Jul 23, 2026 ^{PS5} | Yes | Yes | Yes | No |
| Balloon Bomber | Taito | 1980 | Oct 1, 2026 | Oct 1, 2026 | Oct 1, 2026 | Oct 1, 2026 ^{PS5} | Yes | Yes | Yes | No |
| Battlantis | Konami | 1987 | Oct 9, 2025 | Oct 9, 2025 | Oct 9, 2025 | Oct 9, 2025 ^{PS5} | Yes | Yes | Yes | No |
| Bermuda Triangle | SNK | 1987 | Dec 4, 2025 | Dec 4, 2025 | Dec 4, 2025 | Dec 4, 2025 ^{PS5} | No | Yes | Yes | No |
| Bomb Bee | Namco | 1979 | Nov 20, 2025 | Nov 20, 2025 | Nov 20, 2025 | Nov 20, 2025 ^{PS5} | Yes | Yes | Yes | No |
| Bomb Jack Twin | NMK | 1993 | Jan 15, 2026 | Jan 15, 2026 | Jan 15, 2026 | Jan 15, 2026 ^{PS5} | Yes | Yes | Yes | No |
| Cameltry | Taito | 1989 | Jun 4, 2026 | Jun 4, 2026 | Jun 4, 2026 | Jun 4, 2026 ^{PS5} | Yes | Yes | Yes | No |
| Chopper I | SNK | 1988 | Aug 21, 2025 | Aug 21, 2025 | Aug 21, 2025 | Aug 21, 2025 ^{PS5} | No | Yes | Yes | No |
| Combat School | Konami | 1987 | Aug 6, 2026 | Aug 6, 2026 | Aug 6, 2026 | Aug 6, 2026 ^{PS5} | Yes | Yes | Yes | No |
| Crazy Balloon | Taito | 1980 | Oct 1, 2026 | Oct 1, 2026 | Oct 1, 2026 | Oct 1, 2026 ^{PS5} | Yes | Yes | Yes | Yes |
| Cyber Commando | Namco | 1994 | Apr 30, 2026 | Apr 30, 2026 | Apr 30, 2026 | Apr 30, 2026 ^{PS5} | Yes | Yes | Yes | No |
| Cyber Cycles | Namco | 1995 | Aug 20, 2026 | Aug 20, 2026 | Aug 20, 2026 | Aug 20, 2026 ^{PS5} | Yes | Yes | Yes | No |
| Dacholer | Nichibutsu | 1983 | Sep 17, 2026 | Sep 17, 2026 | Sep 17, 2026 | Sep 17, 2026 ^{PS5} | Yes | Yes | Yes | Yes |
| Devastators | Konami | 1988 | Mar 19, 2026 | Mar 19, 2026 | Mar 19, 2026 | Mar 19, 2026 ^{PS5} | Yes | Yes | Yes | No |
| Elevator Action | Taito | 1983 | Nov 5, 2026 | Nov 5, 2026 | Nov 5, 2026 | Nov 5, 2026 ^{PS5} | Yes | Yes | Yes | Yes |
| Exzisus | Taito | 1987 | Nov 5, 2026 | Nov 5, 2026 | Nov 5, 2026 | Nov 5, 2026 ^{PS5} | Yes | Yes | Yes | No |
| Fighting Golf | SNK | 1988 | Oct 8, 2026 | Oct 8, 2026 | Oct 8, 2026 | Oct 8, 2026 ^{PS5} | No | Yes | Yes | No |
| Final Lap | Namco | 1987 | Mar 26, 2026 | Mar 26, 2026 | Mar 26, 2026 | Mar 26, 2026 ^{PS5} | Yes | Yes | Yes | No |
| Galactic Warriors | Konami | 1985 | Nov 13, 2025 | Nov 13, 2025 | Nov 13, 2025 | Nov 13, 2025 ^{PS5} | Yes | Yes | Yes | No |
| Gee Bee | Namco | 1978 | Oct 2, 2025 | Oct 2, 2025 ^{PS5 / XSXS} Oct 3, 2025 ^{NS2} | Oct 2, 2025 | Oct 2, 2025 ^{PS5} | Yes | Yes | Yes | No |
| Hyper Crash | Konami | 1987 | Jul 9, 2026 | Jul 9, 2026 | Jul 9, 2026 | Jul 9, 2026 ^{PS5} | Yes | Yes | Yes | No |
| Karnov | Data East | 1987 | Sep 10, 2026 | Sep 10, 2026 | Sep 10, 2026 | Sep 10, 2026 ^{PS5} | Yes | Yes | Yes | No |
| Konami GT | Konami | 1985 | Apr 16, 2026 | Apr 16, 2026 | Apr 16, 2026 | Apr 16, 2026 ^{PS5} | Yes | Yes | Yes | No |
| Labyrinth Runner | Konami | 1987 | Jan 22, 2026 | Jan 22, 2026 | Jan 22, 2026 | Jan 22, 2026 ^{PS5} | Yes | Yes | Yes | No |
| Lady Bug | Universal | 1981 | Jul 2, 2026 | Jul 2, 2026 | Jul 2, 2026 | Jul 2, 2026 ^{PS5} | Yes | Yes | Yes | No |
| Mach Breakers | Namco | 1995 | Sep 4, 2025 | Sep 4, 2025 | Sep 4, 2025 | Sep 4, 2025 ^{PS5} | Yes | Yes | Yes | No |
| Mega Zone | Konami | 1983 | Feb 12, 2026 | Feb 12, 2026 | Feb 12, 2026 | Feb 12, 2026 ^{PS5} | Yes | Yes | Yes | No |
| Midnight Landing | Taito | 1987 | Oct 23, 2025 | Oct 23, 2025 | Oct 23, 2025 | Oct 23, 2025 ^{PS5} | Yes | Yes | Yes | No |
| Moon Shuttle | Nichibutsu | 1981 | Jun 25, 2026 | Jun 25, 2026 | Jun 25, 2026 | Jun 25, 2026 ^{PS5} | Yes | Yes | Yes | Yes |
| Mouser | UPL | 1983 | Jul 23, 2026 | Jul 23, 2026 | Jul 23, 2026 | Jul 23, 2026 ^{PS5} | Yes | Yes | Yes | Yes |
| Mr. Do! | Universal | 1982 | May 15, 2026 | May 15, 2026 | May 15, 2026 | May 15, 2026 ^{PS5} | Yes | Yes | Yes | No |
| Mr. Do's Castle | Universal | 1983 | Sep 17, 2026 | Sep 17, 2026 | Sep 17, 2026 | Sep 17, 2026 ^{PS5} | Yes | Yes | Yes | No |
| Munch Mobile | SNK | 1983 | Oct 16, 2025 | Oct 16, 2025 | Oct 16, 2025 | Oct 16, 2025 ^{PS5} | No | Yes | Yes | No |
| Ninja Emaki | Nichibutsu | 1986 | Aug 20, 2026 | Aug 20, 2026 | Aug 20, 2026 | Aug 20, 2026 ^{PS5} | Yes | Yes | Yes | Yes |
| The Outfoxies | Namco | 1995 | Dec 18, 2025 | Dec 18, 2025 | Dec 18, 2025 | Dec 28, 2025 ^{PS5} | Yes | Yes | Yes | No |
| Pinball Action | Tehkan | 1985 | Aug 13, 2026 | Aug 13, 2026 | Aug 13, 2026 | Aug 13, 2026 ^{PS5} | Yes | Yes | Yes | Yes |
| Plump Pop | Taito | 1987 | Mar 5, 2026 | Mar 5, 2026 | Mar 5, 2026 | Mar 5, 2026 ^{PS5} | Yes | Yes | Yes | No |
| Polaris | Taito | 1980 | Apr 9, 2026 | Apr 9, 2026 | Apr 9, 2026 | Apr 9, 2026 ^{PS5} | Yes | Yes | Yes | No |
| Prehistoric Isle | SNK | 1989 | Oct 29, 2026 | Oct 29, 2026 | Oct 29, 2026 | Oct 29, 2026 ^{PS5} | No | Yes | Yes | No |
| Quester | Namco | 1987 | Jan 29, 2026 | Jan 29, 2026 | Jan 29, 2026 | Jan 29, 2026 ^{PS5} | Yes | Yes | Yes | No |
| Rack 'Em Up | Konami | 1987 | Jun 11, 2026 | Jun 11, 2026 | Jun 11, 2026 | Jun 11, 2026 ^{PS5} | Yes | Yes | Yes | No |
| Rave Racer | Namco | 1995 | Feb 26, 2026 | Feb 26, 2026 | Feb 26, 2026 | Feb 26, 2026 ^{PS5} | Yes | Yes | Yes | No |
| Rezon | Allumer | 1991 | Nov 12, 2026 | Nov 12, 2026 | Nov 12, 2026 | Nov 12, 2026 ^{PS5} | Yes | Yes | Yes | Yes |
| Ridge Racer | Namco | 1993 | Jun 5, 2025 | Jun 5, 2025 | Jun 5, 2025 | Jun 5, 2025 ^{PS5} | Yes | Yes | Yes | No |
| Roc'n Rope | Konami | 1983 | Dec 11, 2025 | Dec 11, 2025 | Dec 11, 2025 | Dec 11, 2025 ^{PS5} | Yes | Yes | Yes | No |
| Satan of Saturn | SNK | 1981 | Aug 27, 2026 | Aug 27, 2026 | Aug 27, 2026 | Aug 26, 2026 ^{PS5} | No | Yes | Yes | No |
| Scion | Seibu Kaihatsu | 1984 | Oct 30, 2025 | Oct 30, 2025 | Oct 30, 2025 | Oct 30, 2025 ^{PS5} | Yes | Yes | Yes | No |
| Scrambled Egg | Technōs Japan | 1983 | Aug 28, 2025 | Aug 28, 2025 | Aug 28, 2025 | Aug 28, 2025 ^{PS5} | Yes | Yes | Yes | No |
| Seicross | Nichibutsu | 1984 | Nov 19, 2026 | Nov 19, 2026 | Nov 19, 2026 | Nov 19, 2026 ^{PS5} | Yes | Yes | Yes | Yes |
| Shot Rider | Seibu Kaihatsu | 1985 | Nov 12, 2026 | Nov 12, 2026 | Nov 12, 2026 | Nov 12, 2026 ^{PS5} | Yes | Yes | Yes | No |
| Space Cyclone | Taito | 1980 | Jun 18, 2026 | Jun 18, 2026 | Jun 18, 2026 | Jun 18, 2026 ^{PS5} | Yes | Yes | Yes | No |
| Space Invaders | Taito | 1978 | Dec 25, 2025 | Dec 25, 2025 | Dec 25, 2025 | Dec 25, 2025 ^{PS5} | Yes | Yes | Yes | No |
| Space Invaders Part II | Taito | 1979 | Jan 1, 2026 | Jan 1, 2026 | Jan 1, 2026 | Jan 1, 2026 ^{PS5} | Yes | Yes | Yes | No |
| Steel Worker | Taito | 1980 | Sep 18, 2025 | Sep 18, 2025 | Sep 18, 2025 | Sep 18, 2025 ^{PS5} | Yes | Yes | Yes | No |
| Stinger | Seibu Kaihatsu | 1983 | Oct 15, 2026 | Oct 15, 2026 | Oct 15, 2026 | Oct 15, 2026 ^{PS5} | Yes | Yes | Yes | Yes |
| Street Smart | SNK | 1989 | Apr 23, 2026 | Apr 23, 2026 | Apr 23, 2026 | Apr 23, 2026 ^{PS5} | No | Yes | Yes | No |
| Swimmer | Tehkan | 1982 | Oct 29, 2026 | Oct 29, 2026 | Oct 29, 2026 | Oct 29, 2026 ^{PS5} | Yes | Yes | Yes | Yes |
| Syvalion | Taito | 1988 | Jul 16, 2026 | Jul 16, 2026 | Jul 16, 2026 | Jul 16, 2026 ^{PS5} | Yes | Yes | Yes | No |
| Tag Team Wrestling | Technōs Japan | 1983 | May 21, 2026 | May 21, 2026 | May 21, 2026 | May 21, 2026 ^{PS5} | Yes | Yes | Yes | No |
| Tatakae! Big Fighter | Nichibutsu | 1989 | May 28, 2026 | May 28, 2026 | May 28, 2026 | May 28, 2026 ^{PS5} | Yes | Yes | Yes | Yes |
| Tekken | Namco | 1994 | Jun 25, 2026 | Jun 25, 2026 | Jun 25, 2026 | Jun 25, 2026 ^{PS5} | Yes | Yes | Yes | No |
| Thundercade | SETA | 1987 | Oct 15, 2026 | Oct 15, 2026 | Oct 15, 2026 | Oct 15, 2026 ^{PS5} | Yes | Yes | Yes | No |
| Tokyo Wars | Namco | 1996 | Nov 6, 2025 | Nov 6, 2025 | Nov 6, 2025 | Nov 6, 2025 ^{PS5} | Yes | Yes | Yes | No |
| Top Speed (Full Throttle) | Taito | 1987 | Feb 5, 2026 | Feb 5, 2026 | Feb 5, 2026 | Feb 5, 2026 ^{PS5} | Yes | Yes | Yes | No |
| Touchdown Fever | SNK | 1987 | Jan 8, 2026 ^{XSXS} Jan 13, 2026 ^{PS5} | Jan 8, 2026 ^{XSXS} Jan 13, 2026 ^{PS5} | Jan 8, 2026 ^{XSXS} Jan 13, 2026 ^{PS5} | Jan 13, 2026 ^{PS5} | No | Yes | Yes | No |
| TX-1 | Tatsumi | 1983 | Jul 30, 2026 | Jul 30, 2026 | Jul 30, 2026 | Jul 30, 2026 ^{PS5} | Yes | Yes | Yes | No |
| TX-1 V8 | Tatsumi | 1984 | Nov 19, 2026 | Nov 19, 2026 | Nov 19, 2026 | Nov 19, 2026 ^{PS5} | Yes | Yes | Yes | No |
| V'Ball | Technōs Japan | 1988 | Aug 13, 2026 | Aug 13, 2026 | Aug 13, 2026 | Aug 13, 2026 ^{PS5} | Yes | Yes | Yes | No |
| Video Hustler | Konami | 1981 | Sep 11, 2025 | Sep 11, 2025 | Sep 11, 2025 | Sep 11, 2025 ^{PS5} | Yes | Yes | Yes | No |
| Wiz | Seibu Kaihatsu | 1985 | Sep 3, 2026 | Sep 3, 2026 | Sep 3, 2026 | Sep 3, 2026 ^{PS5} | Yes | Yes | Yes | Yes |
| Xevious 3D/G | Namco | 1996 | Sep 24, 2026 | Sep 24, 2026 | Sep 24, 2026 | Sep 24, 2026 ^{PS5} | Yes | Yes | Yes | No |

=== ACA Neo Geo ===
Titles in the ACA Neo Geo series
| Title | Company | Original release | ACA Release date | | | | ACA Platforms | | | | | |
| Title | Company | Original release | JP | NA | EU/AU | Asia | NS | PS4 | XBO | PC | IOS | AND |
|---|---|---|---|---|---|---|---|---|---|---|---|---|
| 3 Count Bout | SNK | 1993 | Oct 11, 2018 ^{NS / PS4} Oct 16, 2018 ^{XBO} Aug 2, 2019 ^{PC} Jul 27, 2023 ^{IOS / AND} | Oct 11, 2018 ^{NS} Oct 16, 2018 ^{XBO} Jul 12, 2019 ^{PS4} Aug 2, 2019 ^{PC} Jul 26, 2023 ^{IOS / AND} | Oct 11, 2018 ^{NS} Oct 16, 2018 ^{XBO} Aug 2, 2019 ^{PC} Jul 27, 2023 ^{IOS / AND} | Oct 11, 2018 ^{NS / PS4} Oct 16, 2018 ^{XBO} Aug 2, 2019 ^{PC} Jul 27, 2023 ^{IOS / AND} | Yes | Yes | Yes | Yes | Yes | Yes |
| Aero Fighters 2 | Video System | 1994 | Aug 3, 2017 ^{NS / PS4 / XBO} May 25, 2018 ^{PC} May 12, 2022 ^{IOS / AND} | Aug 3, 2017 ^{NS / PS4 / XBO} May 25, 2018 ^{PC} May 11, 2022 ^{IOS / AND} | Aug 3, 2017 ^{NS / PS4 / XBO} May 25, 2018 ^{PC} May 12, 2022 ^{IOS / AND} | Aug 3, 2017 ^{NS / PS4 / XBO} May 25, 2018 ^{PC} May 12, 2022 ^{IOS / AND} | Yes | Yes | Yes | Yes | Yes | Yes |
| Aero Fighters 3 | Video System | 1995 | Mar 15, 2018 ^{NS / PS4 / XBO} Nov 30, 2018 ^{PC} Sep 22, 2022 ^{IOS / AND} | Mar 15, 2018 ^{NS / XBO} Nov 30, 2018 ^{PC} Jan 28, 2019 ^{PS4} Sep 21, 2022 ^{IOS / AND} | Mar 15, 2018 ^{NS / XBO} Apr 24, 2018 ^{PS4} Nov 30, 2018 ^{PC} Sep 22, 2022 ^{IOS / AND} | Mar 15, 2018 ^{NS / PS4 / XBO} Nov 30, 2018 ^{PC} Sep 22, 2022 ^{IOS / AND} | Yes | Yes | Yes | Yes | Yes | Yes |
| Aggressors of Dark Kombat | SNK | 1994 | Sep 13, 2018 ^{NS / PS4 / XBO} Jul 5, 2019 ^{PC} Jun 22, 2023 ^{IOS / AND} | Sep 13, 2018 ^{NS / XBO} Apr 30, 2019 ^{PS4} Jul 5, 2019 ^{PC} Jun 21, 2023 ^{IOS / AND} | Sep 13, 2018 ^{NS / XBO} Jul 5, 2019 ^{PC} Jun 22, 2023 ^{IOS / AND} | Sep 13, 2018 ^{NS / PS4 / XBO} Jul 5, 2019 ^{PC} Jun 22, 2023 ^{IOS / AND} | Yes | Yes | Yes | Yes | Yes | Yes |
| Alpha Mission II | SNK | 1991 | Dec 26, 2016 ^{PS4} Apr 6, 2017 ^{NS} Apr 27, 2017 ^{XBO} Feb 28, 2018 ^{PC} Nov 30, 2021 ^{IOS / AND} | Jan 10, 2017 ^{PS4} Apr 6, 2017 ^{NS} Apr 27, 2017 ^{XBO} Feb 28, 2018 ^{PC} Nov 30, 2021 ^{IOS / AND} | Jan 18, 2017 ^{PS4} Apr 6, 2017 ^{NS} Apr 27, 2017 ^{XBO} Feb 28, 2018 ^{PC} Nov 30, 2021 ^{IOS / AND} | Dec 26, 2016 ^{PS4} Apr 6, 2017 ^{NS} Apr 27, 2017 ^{XBO} Feb 28, 2018 ^{PC} Nov 30, 2021 ^{IOS / AND} | Yes | Yes | Yes | Yes | Yes | Yes |
| Art of Fighting | SNK | 1992 | Mar 23, 2017 ^{PS4 / XBO} Sep 21, 2017 ^{NS} Dec 15, 2017 ^{PC} Apr 28, 2022 ^{IOS / AND} | Mar 23, 2017 ^{XBO} Apr 20, 2017 ^{PS4} Sep 21, 2017 ^{NS} Dec 15, 2017 ^{PC} Apr 27, 2022 ^{IOS / AND} | Mar 23, 2017 ^{XBO} Apr 27, 2017 ^{PS4} Sep 21, 2017 ^{NS} Dec 15, 2017 ^{PC} Apr 28, 2022 ^{IOS / AND} | Mar 23, 2017 ^{PS4 / XBO} Sep 21, 2017 ^{NS} Dec 15, 2017 ^{PC} Apr 28, 2022 ^{IOS / AND} | Yes | Yes | Yes | Yes | Yes | Yes |
| Art of Fighting 2 | SNK | 1994 | Jun 22, 2017 ^{XBO} Jul 27, 2017 ^{PS4} Jan 11, 2018 ^{NS} Apr 27, 2018 ^{PC} Dec 8, 2022 ^{IOS / AND} | Jun 22, 2017 ^{XBO} Aug 11, 2017 ^{PS4} Jan 11, 2018 ^{NS} Apr 27, 2018 ^{PC} Dec 7, 2022 ^{IOS / AND} | Jun 22, 2017 ^{XBO} Aug 11, 2017 ^{PS4} Jan 11, 2018 ^{NS} Apr 27, 2018 ^{PC} Dec 8, 2022 ^{IOS / AND} | Jun 22, 2017 ^{XBO} Jul 27, 2017 ^{PS4} Jan 11, 2018 ^{NS} Apr 27, 2018 ^{PC} Dec 8, 2022 ^{IOS / AND} | Yes | Yes | Yes | Yes | Yes | Yes |
| Art of Fighting 3: The Path of the Warrior | SNK | 1996 | Nov 2, 2017 ^{NS} Jul 26, 2018 ^{PS4 / XBO} May 17, 2019 ^{PC} Jun 23, 2022 ^{IOS / AND} | Nov 2, 2017 ^{NS} Jul 26, 2018 ^{XBO} May 17, 2019 ^{PC} Mar 12, 2020 ^{PS4} Jun 22, 2022 ^{IOS / AND} | Nov 2, 2017 ^{NS} Jul 26, 2018 ^{XBO} May 17, 2019 ^{PC} Mar 3, 2020 ^{PS4} Jun 23, 2022 ^{IOS / AND} | Nov 2, 2017 ^{NS} Jul 26, 2018 ^{PS4 / XBO} May 17, 2019 ^{PC} Jun 23, 2022 ^{IOS / AND} | Yes | Yes | Yes | Yes | Yes | Yes |
| Baseball Stars Professional | SNK | 1990 | May 17, 2018 ^{NS / PS4 / XBO} Mar 15, 2019 ^{PC} Mar 30, 2023 ^{IOS / AND} | May 17, 2018 ^{NS / XBO} Mar 14, 2019 ^{PS4} Mar 15, 2019 ^{PC} Mar 29, 2023 ^{IOS / AND} | May 17, 2018 ^{NS / XBO} Mar 15, 2019 ^{PC} Mar 30, 2023 ^{IOS / AND} | May 17, 2018 ^{NS / PS4 / XBO} Mar 15, 2019 ^{PC} Mar 30, 2023 ^{IOS / AND} | Yes | Yes | Yes | Yes | Yes | Yes |
| Baseball Stars 2 | SNK | 1992 | Mar 21, 2019 ^{NS / XBO} Mar 22, 2019 ^{PS4} Dec 13, 2019 ^{PC} Sep 28, 2023 ^{IOS / AND} | Mar 21, 2019 ^{NS / XBO} Mar 22, 2019 ^{PS4} Dec 13, 2019 ^{PC} Sep 27, 2023 ^{IOS / AND} | Mar 21, 2019 ^{NS / XBO} Dec 13, 2019 ^{PC} Sep 28, 2023 ^{IOS / AND} | Mar 21, 2019 ^{NS / XBO} Mar 22, 2019 ^{PS4} Dec 13, 2019 ^{PC} Sep 28, 2023 ^{IOS / AND} | Yes | Yes | Yes | Yes | Yes | Yes |
| Big Tournament Golf (Note: Marketed as Neo Turf Masters in English territory until Aug 2019.) | SNK | 1996 | Feb 23, 2017 ^{PS4 / XBO} Mar 23, 2017 ^{NS} Dec 28, 2017 ^{PC} Feb 3, 2022 ^{IOS / AND} | Feb 23, 2017 ^{PS4 / XBO} Mar 23, 2017 ^{NS} Dec 28, 2017 ^{PC} Feb 2, 2022 ^{IOS / AND} | Feb 23, 2017 ^{PS4 / XBO} Mar 23, 2017 ^{NS} Dec 28, 2017 ^{PC} Feb 3, 2022 ^{IOS / AND} | Feb 23, 2017 ^{PS4 / XBO} Mar 23, 2017 ^{NS} Dec 28, 2017 ^{PC} Feb 3, 2022 ^{IOS / AND} | Yes | Yes | Yes | Yes | Yes | Yes |
| Blazing Star | SNK | 1998 | May 2, 2017 ^{NS} Feb 8, 2018 ^{PS4 / XBO} Oct 26, 2018 ^{PC} Nov 2, 2023 ^{IOS / AND} | May 2, 2017 ^{NS} Feb 8, 2018 ^{XBO} Oct 26, 2018 ^{PC} Jan 22, 2019 ^{PS4} Nov 1, 2023 ^{IOS / AND} | May 2, 2017 ^{NS} Feb 8, 2018 ^{XBO} Apr 19, 2018 ^{PS4} Oct 26, 2018 ^{PC} Nov 2, 2023 ^{IOS / AND} | May 2, 2017 ^{NS} Feb 8, 2018 ^{PS4 / XBO} Oct 26, 2018 ^{PC} Nov 2, 2023 ^{IOS / AND} | Yes | Yes | Yes | Yes | Yes | Yes |
| Blue's Journey | SNK | 1991 | Sep 7, 2017 ^{NS / PS4 / XBO} Jun 29, 2018 ^{PC} May 26, 2022 ^{IOS / AND} | Sep 7, 2017 ^{NS / PS4 / XBO} Jun 29, 2018 ^{PC} May 25, 2022 ^{IOS / AND} | Sep 7, 2017 ^{NS / XBO} Sep 12, 2017 ^{PS4} Jun 29, 2018 ^{PC} May 26, 2022 ^{IOS / AND} | Sep 7, 2017 ^{NS / PS4 / XBO} Jun 29, 2018 ^{PC} May 26, 2022 ^{IOS / AND} | Yes | Yes | Yes | Yes | Yes | Yes |
| Burning Fight | SNK | 1991 | Sep 28, 2017 ^{NS / PS4 / XBO} Aug 2, 2018 ^{PC} Jun 16, 2022 ^{IOS / AND} | Sep 28, 2017 ^{NS / XBO} Oct 11, 2017 ^{PS4} Aug 2, 2018 ^{PC} Jun 15, 2022 ^{IOS / AND} | Sep 28, 2017 ^{NS / XBO} Oct 10, 2017 ^{PS4} Aug 2, 2018 ^{PC} Jun 16, 2022 ^{IOS / AND} | Sep 28, 2017 ^{NS / PS4 / XBO} Aug 2, 2018 ^{PC} Jun 16, 2022 ^{IOS / AND} | Yes | Yes | Yes | Yes | Yes | Yes |
| Crossed Swords | SNK | 1991 | Aug 23, 2018 ^{NS / PS4 / XBO} Jun 14, 2019 ^{PC} Jun 1, 2023 ^{IOS / AND} | Aug 23, 2018 ^{NS / XBO} May 29, 2019 ^{PS4} Jun 14, 2019 ^{PC} May 31, 2023 ^{IOS / AND} | Aug 23, 2018 ^{NS / XBO} Jun 14, 2019 ^{PC} Jun 1, 2023 ^{IOS / AND} | Aug 23, 2018 ^{NS / PS4 / XBO} Jun 14, 2019 ^{PC} Jun 1, 2023 ^{IOS / AND} | Yes | Yes | Yes | Yes | Yes | Yes |
| Cyber-Lip | SNK | 1990 | Sep 20, 2018 ^{NS / PS4} Dec 4, 2018 ^{XBO} Jul 19, 2019 ^{PC} Aug 31, 2023 ^{IOS / AND} | Sep 20, 2018 ^{NS} Dec 4, 2018 ^{XBO} Jul 3, 2019 ^{PS4} Jul 19, 2019 ^{PC} Aug 30, 2023 ^{IOS / AND} | Sep 20, 2018 ^{NS} Dec 4, 2018 ^{XBO} Jul 19, 2019 ^{PC} Aug 31, 2023 ^{IOS / AND} | Sep 20, 2018 ^{NS / PS4} Dec 4, 2018 ^{XBO} Jul 19, 2019 ^{PC} Aug 31, 2023 ^{IOS / AND} | Yes | Yes | Yes | Yes | Yes | Yes |
| Fatal Fury: King of Fighters | SNK | 1991 | Dec 15, 2016 ^{PS4} Mar 23, 2017 ^{XBO} Apr 20, 2017 ^{NS} Dec 15, 2017 ^{PC} Mar 10, 2022 ^{IOS / AND} | Jan 12, 2017 ^{PS4} Mar 23, 2017 ^{XBO} Apr 20, 2017 ^{NS} Dec 15, 2017 ^{PC} Mar 9, 2022 ^{IOS / AND} | Jan 4, 2017 ^{PS4} Mar 23, 2017 ^{XBO} Apr 20, 2017 ^{NS} Dec 15, 2017 ^{PC} Mar 10, 2022 ^{IOS / AND} | Dec 15, 2016 ^{PS4} Mar 23, 2017 ^{XBO} Apr 20, 2017 ^{NS} Dec 15, 2017 ^{PC} Mar 10, 2022 ^{IOS / AND} | Yes | Yes | Yes | Yes | Yes | Yes |
| Fatal Fury 2 | SNK | 1992 | Apr 20, 2017 ^{XBO} Jun 22, 2017 ^{NS / PS4} Feb 28, 2018 ^{PC} Apr 7, 2022 ^{IOS / AND} | Apr 20, 2017 ^{XBO} Jun 22, 2017 ^{NS} Jun 27, 2017 ^{PS4} Feb 28, 2018 ^{PC} Apr 6, 2022 ^{IOS / AND} | Apr 20, 2017 ^{XBO} Jun 22, 2017 ^{NS} Jun 27, 2017 ^{PS4} Feb 28, 2018 ^{PC} Apr 7, 2022 ^{IOS / AND} | Apr 20, 2017 ^{XBO} Jun 22, 2017 ^{NS / PS4} Feb 28, 2018 ^{PC} Apr 7, 2022 ^{IOS / AND} | Yes | Yes | Yes | Yes | Yes | Yes |
| Fatal Fury Special | SNK | 1993 | Jul 13, 2017 ^{NS / PS4 / XBO} May 25, 2018 ^{PC} Dec 21, 2023 ^{IOS / AND} | Jul 13, 2017 ^{NS / PS4 / XBO} May 25, 2018 ^{PC} Dec 20, 2023 ^{IOS / AND} | Jul 13, 2017 ^{NS / PS4 / XBO} May 25, 2018 ^{PC} Dec 21, 2023 ^{IOS / AND} | Jul 13, 2017 ^{NS / PS4 / XBO} May 25, 2018 ^{PC} Dec 21, 2023 ^{IOS / AND} | Yes | Yes | Yes | Yes | Yes | Yes |
| Fatal Fury 3: Road to the Final Victory | SNK | 1995 | Aug 31, 2017 ^{PS4 / XBO} Feb 15, 2018 ^{NS} Jun 29, 2018 ^{PC} Jan 12, 2023 ^{IOS / AND} | Aug 31, 2017 ^{PS4 / XBO} Feb 15, 2018 ^{NS} Jun 29, 2018 ^{PC} Jan 11, 2023 ^{IOS / AND} | Aug 31, 2017 ^{PS4 / XBO} Feb 15, 2018 ^{NS} Jun 29, 2018 ^{PC} Jan 12, 2023 ^{IOS / AND} | Aug 31, 2017 ^{PS4 / XBO} Feb 15, 2018 ^{NS} Jun 29, 2018 ^{PC} Jan 12, 2023 ^{IOS / AND} | Yes | Yes | Yes | Yes | Yes | Yes |
| Football Frenzy | SNK | 1992 | Aug 30, 2018 ^{NS / PS4 / XBO} Jun 21, 2019 ^{PC} Jun 8, 2023 ^{IOS / AND} | Aug 30, 2018 ^{NS / XBO} May 7, 2019 ^{PS4} Jun 21, 2019 ^{PC} Jun 7, 2023 ^{IOS / AND} | Aug 30, 2018 ^{NS / XBO} Jun 21, 2019 ^{PC} Jun 8, 2023 ^{IOS / AND} | Aug 30, 2018 ^{NS / PS4 / XBO} Jun 21, 2019 ^{PC} Jun 8, 2023 ^{IOS / AND} | Yes | Yes | Yes | Yes | Yes | Yes |
| Galaxy Fight: Universal Warriors | Sunsoft | 1995 | Apr 6, 2017 ^{PS4 / XBO} May 18, 2017 ^{NS} Feb 28, 2018 ^{PC} | Apr 6, 2017 ^{XBO} Apr 27, 2017 ^{PS4} May 18, 2017 ^{NS} Feb 28, 2018 ^{PC} | Apr 6, 2017 ^{XBO} May 17, 2017 ^{PS4} May 18, 2017 ^{NS} Feb 28, 2018 ^{PC} | Apr 6, 2017 ^{PS4 / XBO} May 18, 2017 ^{NS} Feb 28, 2018 ^{PC} | Yes | Yes | Yes | Yes | No | No |
| Garou: Mark of the Wolves | SNK | 1999 | May 11, 2017 ^{NS} Aug 16, 2018 ^{PS4 / XBO} Jun 7, 2019 ^{PC} Jul 25, 2024 ^{IOS / AND} | May 11, 2017 ^{NS} Aug 16, 2018 ^{XBO} Mar 28, 2019 ^{PS4} Jun 7, 2019 ^{PC} Jul 24, 2024 ^{IOS / AND} | May 11, 2017 ^{NS} Aug 16, 2018 ^{XBO} Jun 7, 2019 ^{PC} Jul 25, 2024 ^{IOS / AND} | May 11, 2017 ^{NS} Aug 16, 2018 ^{PS4 / XBO} Jun 7, 2019 ^{PC} Jul 25, 2024 ^{IOS / AND} | Yes | Yes | Yes | Yes | Yes | Yes |
| Ghost Pilots | SNK | 1991 | Apr 26, 2018 ^{NS / PS4 / XBO} Dec 21, 2018 ^{PC} Mar 9, 2023 ^{IOS / AND} | Apr 26, 2018 ^{NS / XBO} Jun 8, 2018 ^{PS4} Dec 21, 2018 ^{PC} Mar 8, 2023 ^{IOS / AND} | Apr 26, 2018 ^{NS / XBO} Jun 8, 2018 ^{PS4} Dec 21, 2018 ^{PC} Mar 9, 2023 ^{IOS / AND} | Apr 26, 2018 ^{NS / PS4 / XBO} Dec 21, 2018 ^{PC} Mar 9, 2023 ^{IOS / AND} | Yes | Yes | Yes | Yes | Yes | Yes |
| Gururin | Face | 1994 | Apr 12, 2018 ^{NS / PS4 / XBO} Dec 21, 2018 ^{PC} | Apr 12, 2018 ^{NS / XBO} Jun 8, 2018 ^{PS4} Dec 21, 2018 ^{PC} | Apr 12, 2018 ^{NS / XBO} Jun 8, 2018 ^{PS4} Dec 21, 2018 ^{PC} | Apr 12, 2018 ^{NS / PS4 / XBO} Dec 21, 2018 ^{PC} | Yes | Yes | Yes | Yes | No | No |
| Karnov's Revenge | Data East | 1994 | Nov 16, 2017 ^{NS / PS4 / XBO} Aug 31, 2018 ^{PC} | Nov 16, 2017 ^{NS / XBO} Dec 7, 2017 ^{PS4} Aug 31, 2018 ^{PC} | Nov 16, 2017 ^{NS / XBO} Dec 4, 2017 ^{PS4} Aug 31, 2018 ^{PC} | Nov 16, 2017 ^{NS / PS4 / XBO} Aug 31, 2018 ^{PC} | Yes | Yes | Yes | Yes | No | No |
| The King of Fighters '94 | SNK | 1994 | Oct 27, 2016 ^{PS4} Mar 9, 2017 ^{XBO} Mar 16, 2017 ^{NS} Dec 15, 2017 ^{PC} Feb 10, 2022 ^{IOS / AND} | Oct 27, 2016 ^{PS4} Mar 9, 2017 ^{XBO} Mar 16, 2017 ^{NS} Dec 15, 2017 ^{PC} Feb 9, 2022 ^{IOS / AND} | Oct 27, 2016 ^{PS4} Mar 9, 2017 ^{XBO} Mar 16, 2017 ^{NS} Dec 15, 2017 ^{PC} Feb 10, 2022 ^{IOS / AND} | Oct 27, 2016 ^{PS4} Mar 9, 2017 ^{XBO} Mar 16, 2017 ^{NS} Dec 15, 2017 ^{PC} Feb 10, 2022 ^{IOS / AND} | Yes | Yes | Yes | Yes | Yes | Yes |
| The King of Fighters '95 | SNK | 1995 | Mar 30, 2017 ^{XBO} Apr 27, 2017 ^{PS4} Oct 12, 2017 ^{NS} Feb 28, 2018 ^{PC} Jun 2, 2022 ^{IOS / AND} | Mar 30, 2017 ^{XBO} May 11, 2017 ^{PS4} Oct 12, 2017 ^{NS} Feb 28, 2018 ^{PC} Jun 1, 2022 ^{IOS / AND} | Mar 30, 2017 ^{XBO} May 16, 2017 ^{PS4} Oct 12, 2017 ^{NS} Feb 28, 2018 ^{PC} Jun 2, 2022 ^{IOS / AND} | Mar 30, 2017 ^{XBO} Apr 27, 2017 ^{PS4} Oct 12, 2017 ^{NS} Feb 28, 2018 ^{PC} Jun 2, 2022 ^{IOS / AND} | Yes | Yes | Yes | Yes | Yes | Yes |
| The King of Fighters '96 | SNK | 1996 | Aug 10, 2017 ^{PS4 / XBO} Dec 28, 2017 ^{NS} Apr 27, 2018 ^{PC} Jul 7, 2022 ^{IOS / AND} | Aug 10, 2017 ^{PS4 / XBO} Dec 28, 2017 ^{NS} Apr 27, 2018 ^{PC} Jul 6, 2022 ^{IOS / AND} | Aug 10, 2017 ^{XBO} Aug 11, 2017 ^{PS4} Dec 28, 2017 ^{NS} Apr 27, 2018 ^{PC} Jul 7, 2022 ^{IOS / AND} | Aug 10, 2017 ^{PS4 / XBO} Dec 28, 2017 ^{NS} Apr 27, 2018 ^{PC} Jul 7, 2022 ^{IOS / AND} | Yes | Yes | Yes | Yes | Yes | Yes |
| The King of Fighters '97 | SNK | 1997 | Nov 2, 2017 ^{PS4 / XBO} Jul 26, 2018 ^{NS} Aug 31, 2018 ^{PC} Dec 7, 2023 ^{IOS / AND} | Nov 2, 2017 ^{PS4 / XBO} Jul 26, 2018 ^{NS} Aug 31, 2018 ^{PC} Dec 6, 2023 ^{IOS / AND} | Nov 2, 2017 ^{XBO} Nov 21, 2017 ^{PS4} Jul 26, 2018 ^{NS} Aug 31, 2018 ^{PC} Dec 7, 2023 ^{IOS / AND} | Nov 2, 2017 ^{PS4 / XBO} Jul 26, 2018 ^{NS} Aug 31, 2018 ^{PC} Dec 7, 2023 ^{IOS / AND} | Yes | Yes | Yes | Yes | Yes | Yes |
| The King of Fighters '98: The Slugfest | SNK | 1998 | Mar 3, 2017 ^{NS} Jan 11, 2018 ^{PS4 / XBO} Sep 28, 2018 ^{PC} Oct 5, 2023 ^{IOS / AND} | Mar 9, 2017 ^{NS} Jan 11, 2018 ^{XBO} Feb 26, 2018 ^{PS4} Sep 28, 2018 ^{PC} Oct 4, 2023 ^{IOS / AND} | Mar 3, 2017 ^{NS} Jan 11, 2018 ^{PS4 / XBO} Sep 28, 2018 ^{PC} Oct 5, 2023^{IOS / AND} | Mar 3, 2017 ^{NS} Jan 11, 2018 ^{PS4 / XBO} Sep 28, 2018 ^{PC} Oct 5, 2023 ^{IOS / AND} | Yes | Yes | Yes | Yes | Yes | Yes |
| The King of Fighters '99: Millennium Battle | SNK | 1999 | May 25, 2017 ^{NS} Apr 5, 2018 ^{PS4 / XBO} Dec 21, 2018 ^{PC} Aug 18, 2022 ^{IOS / AND} | May 25, 2017 ^{NS} Apr 5, 2018 ^{XBO} Dec 21, 2018 ^{PC} Jan 18, 2019 ^{PS4} Aug 17, 2022 ^{IOS / AND} | May 25, 2017 ^{NS} Apr 5, 2018 ^{XBO} Dec 21, 2018 ^{PC} Dec 20, 2019 ^{PS4} Aug 18, 2022 ^{IOS / AND} | May 25, 2017 ^{NS} Apr 5, 2018 ^{PS4 / XBO} Dec 21, 2018 ^{PC} Aug 18, 2022 ^{IOS / AND} | Yes | Yes | Yes | Yes | Yes | Yes |
| The King of Fighters 2000 | SNK | 2000 | Aug 10, 2017 ^{NS} Jun 21, 2018 ^{PS4 / XBO} Mar 29, 2019 ^{PC} Sep 8, 2022 ^{IOS / AND} | Aug 10, 2017 ^{NS} Jun 21, 2018 ^{XBO} Mar 1, 2019 ^{PS4} Mar 29, 2019 ^{PC} Sep 7, 2022 ^{IOS / AND} | Aug 10, 2017 ^{NS} Jun 21, 2018 ^{XBO} Mar 29, 2019 ^{PC} Dec 22, 2020 ^{PS4} Sep 8, 2022 ^{IOS / AND} | Aug 10, 2017 ^{NS} Jun 21, 2018 ^{PS4 / XBO} Mar 29, 2019 ^{PC} Sep 8, 2022 ^{IOS / AND} | Yes | Yes | Yes | Yes | Yes | Yes |
| The King of Fighters 2001 | SNK | 2001 | Sep 27, 2018 ^{NS / PS4 / XBO} Jul 12, 2019 ^{PC} Oct 13, 2022 ^{IOS / AND} | Sep 27, 2018 ^{NS / XBO} Mar 14, 2019 ^{PS4} Jul 12, 2019 ^{PC} Oct 12, 2022 ^{IOS / AND} | Sep 27, 2018 ^{NS / XBO} Jul 12, 2019 ^{PC} Jan 5, 2021 ^{PS4} Oct 13, 2022 ^{IOS / AND} | Sep 27, 2018 ^{NS / PS4 / XBO} Jul 12, 2019 ^{PC} Oct 13, 2022 ^{IOS / AND} | Yes | Yes | Yes | Yes | Yes | Yes |
| The King of Fighters 2002: Challenge to Ultimate Battle | SNK | 2002 | Dec 27, 2018 ^{NS / PS4 / XBO} Sep 20, 2019 ^{PC} Jan 27, 2022 ^{IOS / AND} | Dec 27, 2018 ^{NS / XBO} Mar 27, 2019 ^{PS4} Sep 20, 2019 ^{PC} Jan 26, 2022 ^{IOS / AND} | Dec 27, 2018 ^{NS / XBO} Sep 20, 2019 ^{PC} Jan 27, 2022 ^{IOS / AND} | Dec 27, 2018 ^{NS / PS4 / XBO} Sep 20, 2019 ^{PC} Jan 27, 2022 ^{IOS / AND} | Yes | Yes | Yes | Yes | Yes | Yes |
| The King of Fighters 2003 | SNK | 2003 | Feb 21, 2019 ^{NS / PS4 / XBO} Nov 29, 2019 ^{PC} Nov 17, 2022 ^{IOS / AND} | Feb 21, 2019 ^{NS / XBO} Nov 29, 2019 ^{PC} Dec 8, 2020 ^{PS4} Nov 16, 2022 ^{IOS / AND} | Feb 21, 2019 ^{NS / XBO} Nov 29, 2019 ^{PC} Nov 17, 2022 ^{IOS / AND} | Feb 21, 2019 ^{NS / PS4 / XBO} Nov 29, 2019 ^{PC} Nov 17, 2022 ^{IOS / AND} | Yes | Yes | Yes | Yes | Yes | Yes |
| King of the Monsters | SNK | 1991 | Jun 8, 2017 ^{XBO} Jul 20, 2017 ^{PS4} Jan 4, 2018 ^{NS} Feb 28, 2018 ^{PC} Feb 17, 2022 ^{IOS /AND} | Jun 8, 2017 ^{XBO} Jul 20, 2017 ^{PS4} Jan 4, 2018 ^{NS} Feb 28, 2018 ^{PC} Feb 16, 2022 ^{IOS / AND} | Jun 8, 2017 ^{XBO} Jul 20, 2017 ^{PS4} Jan 4, 2018 ^{NS} Feb 28, 2018 ^{PC} Feb 17, 2022 ^{IOS / AND} | Jun 8, 2017 ^{XBO} Jul 20, 2017 ^{PS4} Jan 4, 2018 ^{NS} Feb 28, 2018 ^{PC} Feb 17, 2022 ^{IOS / AND} | Yes | Yes | Yes | Yes | Yes | Yes |
| King of the Monsters 2: The Next Thing | SNK | 1992 | Nov 22, 2018 ^{NS / PS4 / XBO} Sep 27, 2019 ^{PC} Jul 20, 2023 ^{IOS / AND} | Nov 22, 2018 ^{NS / XBO} Jul 30, 2019 ^{PS4} Sep 27, 2019 ^{PC} Jul 19, 2023 ^{IOS / AND} | Nov 22, 2018 ^{NS / XBO} Sep 27, 2019 ^{PC} Mar 10, 2020 ^{PS4} Jul 20, 2023 ^{IOS / AND} | Nov 22, 2018 ^{NS / PS4 / XBO} Sep 27, 2019 ^{PC} Jul 20, 2023 ^{IOS / AND} | Yes | Yes | Yes | Yes | Yes | Yes |
| Kizuna Encounter: Super Tag Battle | SNK | 1996 | Jan 10, 2019 ^{NS / PS4 / XBO} Oct 11, 2019 ^{PC} Aug 24, 2023 ^{IOS / AND} | Jan 10, 2019 ^{NS / XBO} Oct 11, 2019 ^{PC} Aug 23, 2023 ^{IOS / AND} | Jan 10, 2019 ^{NS / XBO} Oct 11, 2019 ^{PC} Aug 24, 2023 ^{IOS / AND} | Jan 10, 2019 ^{NS / PS4 / XBO} Oct 11, 2019 ^{PC} Aug 24, 2023 ^{IOS / AND} | Yes | Yes | Yes | Yes | Yes | Yes |
| The Last Blade | SNK | 1997 | May 18, 2017 ^{PS4 / XBO} Dec 14, 2017 ^{NS} Feb 28, 2018 ^{PC} Jul 21, 2022 ^{IOS / AND} | May 18, 2017 ^{XBO} Jun 15, 2017 ^{PS4} Dec 14, 2017 ^{NS} Feb 28, 2018 ^{PC} Jul 20, 2022 ^{IOS / AND} | May 18, 2017 ^{XBO} May 25, 2017 ^{PS4} Dec 14, 2017 ^{NS} Feb 28, 2018 ^{PC} Jul 21, 2022 ^{IOS / AND} | May 18, 2017 ^{PS4 / XBO} Dec 14, 2017 ^{NS} Feb 28, 2018 ^{PC} Jul 21, 2022 ^{IOS / AND} | Yes | Yes | Yes | Yes | Yes | Yes |
| The Last Blade 2 | SNK | 1998 | Feb 15, 2018 ^{PS4 / XBO} Jun 21, 2018 ^{NS} Oct 26, 2018 ^{PC} Oct 20, 2022 ^{IOS / AND} | Feb 15, 2018 ^{XBO} Apr 19, 2018 ^{PS4} Jun 21, 2018 ^{NS} Oct 26, 2018 ^{PC} Oct 19, 2022 ^{IOS / AND} | Feb 15, 2018 ^{XBO} Jun 21, 2018 ^{NS} Oct 26, 2018 ^{PC} Dec 20, 2019 ^{PS4} Oct 20, 2022 ^{IOS / AND} | Feb 15, 2018 ^{PS4 / XBO} Jun 21, 2018 ^{NS} Oct 26, 2018 ^{PC} Oct 20, 2022 ^{IOS / AND} | Yes | Yes | Yes | Yes | Yes | Yes |
| Last Resort | SNK | 1992 | May 2, 2017 ^{PS4 / XBO} Jun 1, 2017 ^{NS} Dec 15, 2017 ^{PC} Mar 3, 2022 ^{IOS / AND} | May 2, 2017 ^{PS4 / XBO} Jun 1, 2017 ^{NS} Dec 15, 2017 ^{PC} Mar 2, 2022 ^{IOS / AND} | May 2, 2017 ^{PS4 / XBO} Jun 1, 2017 ^{NS} Dec 15, 2017 ^{PC} Mar 3, 2022 ^{IOS / AND} | May 2, 2017 ^{PS4 / XBO} Jun 1, 2017 ^{NS} Dec 15, 2017 ^{PC} Mar 3, 2022 ^{IOS / AND} | Yes | Yes | Yes | Yes | Yes | Yes |
| League Bowling | SNK | 1990 | Jul 19, 2018 ^{NS / PS4 / XBO} May 10, 2019 ^{PC} May 18, 2023 ^{IOS / AND} | Jul 19, 2018 ^{NS / XBO} May 10, 2019 ^{PC} May 17, 2023 ^{IOS / AND} | Jul 19, 2018 ^{NS / XBO} May 10, 2019 ^{PC} May 18, 2023 ^{IOS / AND} | Jul 19, 2018 ^{NS / PS4 / XBO} May 10, 2019 ^{PC} May 18, 2023 ^{IOS / AND} | Yes | Yes | Yes | Yes | Yes | Yes |
| Magical Drop II | Data East | 1996 | Jun 15, 2017 ^{PS4 / XBO} Jun 29, 2017 ^{NS} May 25, 2018 ^{PC} | Jun 15, 2017 ^{XBO} Jun 20, 2017 ^{PS4} Jun 29, 2017 ^{NS} May 25, 2018 ^{PC} | Jun 15, 2017 ^{XBO} Jun 16, 2017 ^{PS4} Jun 29, 2017 ^{NS} May 25, 2018 ^{PC} | Jun 15, 2017 ^{PS4 / XBO} Jun 29, 2017 ^{NS} May 25, 2018 ^{PC} | Yes | Yes | Yes | Yes | No | No |
| Magical Drop III | Data East | 1997 | Feb 22, 2018 ^{NS / PS4 / XBO} Oct 26, 2018 ^{PC} | Feb 22, 2018 ^{NS / XBO} Jun 6, 2018 ^{PS4} Oct 26, 2018 ^{PC} | Feb 22, 2018 ^{NS / XBO} Apr 19, 2018 ^{PS4} Oct 26, 2018 ^{PC} | Feb 22, 2018 ^{NS / PS4 / XBO} Oct 26, 2018 ^{PC} | Yes | Yes | Yes | Yes | No | No |
| Magician Lord | SNK | 1990 | Aug 17, 2017 ^{NS / PS4 / XBO} Apr 27, 2018 ^{PC} Jun 9, 2022 ^{IOS / AND} | Aug 17, 2017 ^{NS / XBO} Aug 31, 2017 ^{PS4} Apr 27, 2018 ^{PC} Jun 8, 2022 ^{IOS / AND} | Aug 17, 2017 ^{NS / XBO} Aug 31, 2017 ^{PS4} Apr 27, 2018 ^{PC} Jun 9, 2022 ^{IOS / AND} | Aug 17, 2017 ^{NS / PS4 / XBO} Apr 27, 2018 ^{PC} Jun 9, 2022 ^{IOS / AND} | Yes | Yes | Yes | Yes | Yes | Yes |
| Master of Syougi | SNK | 1995 | Apr 2, 2026 | Apr 2, 2026 | Apr 2, 2026 | Apr 2, 2026 | Yes | Yes | No | No | No | No |
| Metal Slug | SNK | 1996 | Nov 24, 2016 ^{PS4} Mar 2, 2017 ^{XBO} Mar 30, 2017 ^{NS} Dec 15, 2017 ^{PC} Nov 30, 2023 ^{IOS / AND} | Nov 28, 2016 ^{PS4} Mar 2, 2017 ^{XBO} Mar 30, 2017 ^{NS} Dec 15, 2017 ^{PC} Nov 29, 2023 ^{IOS / AND} | Nov 24, 2016 ^{PS4} Mar 2, 2017 ^{XBO} Mar 30, 2017 ^{NS} Dec 15, 2017 ^{PC} Nov 30, 2023 ^{IOS / AND} | Nov 24, 2016 ^{PS4} Mar 2, 2017 ^{XBO} Mar 30, 2017 ^{NS} Dec 15, 2017 ^{PC} Nov 30, 2023 ^{IOS / AND} | Yes | Yes | Yes | Yes | Yes | Yes |
| Metal Slug 2 | SNK | 1998 | Jun 1, 2017 ^{PS4 / XBO} Jul 6, 2017 ^{NS} Feb 28, 2018 ^{PC} Dec 14, 2023 ^{IOS / AND} | Jun 1, 2017 ^{PS4 / XBO} Jul 6, 2017 ^{NS} Feb 28, 2018 ^{PC} Dec 13, 2023 ^{IOS / AND} | Jun 1, 2017 ^{PS4 / XBO} Jul 6, 2017 ^{NS} Feb 28, 2018 ^{PC} Dec 14, 2023 ^{IOS / AND} | Jun 1, 2017 ^{PS4 / XBO} Jul 6, 2017 ^{NS} Feb 28, 2018 ^{PC} Dec 14, 2023 ^{IOS / AND} | Yes | Yes | Yes | Yes | Yes | Yes |
| Metal Slug X | SNK | 1999 | Oct 5, 2017 ^{NS / PS4 / XBO} Aug 2, 2018 ^{PC} Jan 18, 2024 ^{IOS / AND} | Oct 5, 2017 ^{NS / XBO} Oct 11, 2017 ^{PS4} Aug 2, 2018 ^{PC} Jan 17, 2024 ^{IOS / AND} | Oct 5, 2017 ^{NS / XBO} Oct 10, 2017 ^{PS4} Aug 2, 2018 ^{PC} Jan 18, 2024 ^{IOS / AND} | Oct 5, 2017 ^{NS / PS4 / XBO} Aug 2, 2018 ^{PC} Jan 18, 2024 ^{IOS / AND} | Yes | Yes | Yes | Yes | Yes | Yes |
| Metal Slug 3 | SNK | 2000 | Mar 3, 2017 ^{NS} Dec 21, 2017 ^{PS4 / XBO} Sep 28, 2018 ^{PC} Nov 9, 2023 ^{IOS / AND} | Mar 9, 2017 ^{NS} Dec 21, 2017 ^{XBO} Feb 26, 2018 ^{PS4} Sep 28, 2018 ^{PC} Nov 8, 2023 ^{IOS / AND} | Mar 3, 2017 ^{NS} Dec 21, 2017 ^{XBO} Jan 5, 2018 ^{PS4} Sep 28, 2018 ^{PC} Nov 9, 2023 ^{IOS / AND} | Mar 3, 2017 ^{NS} Dec 21, 2017 ^{PS4 / XBO} Sep 28, 2018 ^{PC} Nov 9, 2023 ^{IOS / AND} | Yes | Yes | Yes | Yes | Yes | Yes |
| Metal Slug 4 | SNK | 2002 | Aug 9, 2018 ^{NS / PS4 / XBO} May 31, 2019 ^{PC} Aug 4, 2022 ^{IOS / AND} | Aug 9, 2018 ^{NS / XBO} Dec 19, 2018 ^{PS4} May 31, 2019 ^{PC} Aug 3, 2022 ^{IOS / AND} | Aug 9, 2018 ^{NS / XBO} May 31, 2019 ^{PC} Feb 18, 2020 ^{PS4} Aug 4, 2022 ^{IOS / AND} | Aug 9, 2018 ^{NS / PS4 / XBO} May 31, 2019 ^{PC} Aug 4, 2022 ^{IOS / AND} | Yes | Yes | Yes | Yes | Yes | Yes |
| Metal Slug 5 | SNK | 2003 | Dec 13, 2018 ^{NS / PS4 / XBO} Nov 8, 2019 ^{PC} Nov 30, 2021 ^{IOS / AND} | Dec 13, 2018 ^{NS / XBO} Nov 8, 2019 ^{PC} Mar 12, 2020 ^{PS4} Nov 30, 2021 ^{IOS / AND} | Dec 13, 2018 ^{NS / XBO} Nov 8, 2019 ^{PC} Mar 12, 2020 ^{PS4} Nov 30, 2021 ^{IOS / AND} | Dec 13, 2018 ^{NS / PS4 / XBO} Nov 8, 2019 ^{PC} Nov 30, 2021 ^{IOS / AND} | Yes | Yes | Yes | Yes | Yes | Yes |
| Money Puzzle Exchanger | Face | 1997 | Jun 28, 2018 ^{NS / PS4 / XBO} Apr 5, 2019 ^{PC} | Jun 28, 2018 ^{NS / XBO} Mar 12, 2019 ^{PS4} Apr 5, 2019 ^{PC} | Jun 28, 2018 ^{NS / XBO} Apr 5, 2019 ^{PC} | Jun 28, 2018 ^{NS / PS4 / XBO} Apr 5, 2019 ^{PC} | Yes | Yes | Yes | Yes | No | No |
| Mutation Nation | SNK | 1992 | Oct 26, 2017 ^{NS / PS4 / XBO} Aug 2, 2018 ^{PC} Jul 14, 2022 ^{IOS / AND} | Oct 26, 2017 ^{NS / XBO} Oct 27, 2017 ^{PS4} Aug 2, 2018 ^{PC} Jul 13, 2022 ^{IOS / AND} | Oct 26, 2017 ^{NS / XBO} Nov 21, 2017 ^{PS4} Aug 2, 2018 ^{PC} Jul 14, 2022 ^{IOS / AND} | Oct 26, 2017 ^{NS / PS4 / XBO} Aug 2, 2018 ^{PC} Jul 14, 2022 ^{IOS / AND} | Yes | Yes | Yes | Yes | Yes | Yes |
| NAM-1975 | SNK | 1990 | Mar 2, 2017 ^{PS4 / XBO} Mar 9, 2017 ^{NS} Dec 15, 2017 ^{PC} Dec 23, 2021 ^{IOS / AND} | Mar 2, 2017 ^{PS4 / XBO} Mar 9, 2017 ^{NS} Dec 15, 2017 ^{PC} Dec 22, 2021 ^{IOS / AND} | Mar 2, 2017 ^{PS4 / XBO} Mar 9, 2017 ^{NS} Dec 15, 2017 ^{PC} Dec 23, 2021 ^{IOS / AND} | Mar 2, 2017 ^{PS4 / XBO} Mar 9, 2017 ^{NS} Dec 15, 2017 ^{PC} Dec 23, 2021 ^{IOS / AND} | Yes | Yes | Yes | Yes | Yes | Yes |
| Neo Geo Cup '98: The Road to the Victory (Note: These ACA Neo Geo games were quietly removed from all digital stores at the end of Aug 2020 due to issues regarding the Republic of China.) | SNK | 1998 | Nov 29, 2018 ^{NS / PS4 / XBO} Oct 4, 2019 ^{PC} | Nov 29, 2018 ^{NS / XBO} Oct 4, 2019 ^{PC} | Nov 29, 2018 ^{NS / XBO} Oct 4, 2019 ^{PC} | Nov 29, 2018 ^{NS / PS4 / XBO} Oct 4, 2019 ^{PC} | Yes | Yes | Yes | Yes | No | No |
| Ninja Combat | SNK | 1990 | May 31, 2018 ^{NS / PS4 / XBO} Feb 1, 2019 ^{PC} Apr 13, 2023 ^{IOS / AND} | May 31, 2018 ^{NS / XBO} Jun 8, 2018 ^{PS4} Feb 1, 2019 ^{PC} Apr 12, 2023 ^{IOS / AND} | May 31, 2018 ^{NS / XBO} Jun 8, 2018 ^{PS4} Feb 1, 2019 ^{PC} Apr 13, 2023 ^{IOS / AND} | May 31, 2018 ^{NS / PS4 / XBO} Feb 1, 2019 ^{PC} Apr 13, 2023 ^{IOS / AND} | Yes | Yes | Yes | Yes | Yes | Yes |
| Ninja Commando | SNK | 1992 | Sep 6, 2018 ^{NS / PS4 / XBO} Jun 28, 2019 ^{PC} Jun 15, 2023 ^{IOS / AND} | Sep 6, 2018 ^{NS / XBO} May 28, 2019 ^{PS4} Jun 28, 2019 ^{PC} Jun 14, 2023 ^{IOS / AND} | Sep 6, 2018 ^{XBO} Jun 28, 2019 ^{PC} Jun 15, 2023 ^{IOS / AND} | Sep 6, 2018 ^{NS / PS4 / XBO} Jun 28, 2019 ^{PC} Jun 15, 2023 ^{IOS / AND} | Yes | Yes | Yes | Yes | Yes | Yes |
| Ninja Master's: Haō Ninpō Chō | SNK | 1996 | Jan 17, 2019 ^{NS / PS4 / XBO} Nov 1, 2019 ^{PC} Aug 31, 2023 ^{IOS / AND} | Jan 17, 2019 ^{NS / XBO} Nov 1, 2019 ^{PC} Aug 30, 2023 ^{IOS / AND} | Jan 17, 2019 ^{NS / XBO} Nov 1, 2019 ^{PC} Aug 31, 2023 ^{IOS / AND} | Jan 17, 2019 ^{NS / PS4 / XBO} Nov 1, 2019 ^{PC} Aug 31, 2023 ^{IOS / AND} | Yes | Yes | Yes | Yes | Yes | Yes |
| Over Top | SNK | 1996 | Apr 20, 2017 ^{PS4 / XBO} Apr 27, 2017 ^{NS} Dec 15, 2017 ^{PC} Mar 17, 2022 ^{IOS / AND} | Apr 20, 2017 ^{XBO} Apr 27, 2017 ^{NS} May 16, 2017 ^{PS4} Dec 15, 2017 ^{PC} Mar 16, 2022 ^{IOS / AND} | Apr 20, 2017 ^{XBO} Apr 27, 2017 ^{NS} May 8, 2017 ^{PS4} Dec 15, 2017 ^{PC} Mar 17, 2022 ^{IOS / AND} | Apr 20, 2017 ^{PS4 / XBO} Apr 27, 2017 ^{NS} Dec 15, 2017 ^{PC} Mar 17, 2022 ^{IOS / AND} | Yes | Yes | Yes | Yes | Yes | Yes |
| Pleasure Goal: 5 on 5 Mini Soccer | SNK | 1996 | Nov 1, 2018 ^{NS / PS4 / XBO} Aug 23, 2019 ^{PC} Jun 29, 2023 ^{IOS / AND} | Nov 1, 2018 ^{NS / XBO} Jul 23, 2019 ^{PS4} Aug 23, 2019 ^{PC} Jun 28, 2023 ^{IOS / AND} | Nov 1, 2018 ^{NS / XBO} Aug 23, 2019 ^{PC} Jun 29, 2023 ^{IOS / AND} | Nov 1, 2018 ^{NS / PS4 / XBO} Aug 23, 2019 ^{PC} Jun 29, 2023 ^{IOS / AND} | Yes | Yes | Yes | Yes | Yes | Yes |
| Pop'n Bounce | Video System | 1997 | Mar 12, 2026 | Mar 12, 2026 | Mar 12, 2026 | Mar 12, 2026 | Yes | Yes | No | No | No | No |
| Power Spikes II | Video System | 1994 | Jan 18, 2018 ^{NS / PS4 / XBO} Sep 28, 2018 ^{PC} Aug 25, 2022 ^{IOS / AND} | Jan 18, 2018 ^{NS / XBO} Apr 19, 2018 ^{PS4} Sep 28, 2018 ^{PC} Aug 24, 2022 ^{IOS / AND} | Jan 18, 2018 ^{NS / XBO} Apr 19, 2018 ^{PS4} Sep 28, 2018 ^{PC} Aug 25, 2022 ^{IOS / AND} | Jan 18, 2018 ^{NS / PS4 / XBO} Sep 28, 2018 ^{PC} Aug 25, 2022 ^{IOS / AND} | Yes | Yes | Yes | Yes | Yes | Yes |
| Prehistoric Isle 2 | SNK | 1999 | Aug 2, 2018 ^{NS / PS4 / XBO} May 24, 2019 ^{PC} Jan 26, 2023 ^{IOS / AND} | Aug 2, 2018 ^{NS / XBO} Mar 26, 2019 ^{PS4} May 24, 2019 ^{PC} Jan 25, 2023 ^{IOS / AND} | Aug 2, 2018 ^{NS / XBO} May 24, 2019 ^{PC} Jan 26, 2023 ^{IOS / AND} | Aug 2, 2018 ^{NS / PS4 / XBO} May 24, 2019 ^{PC} Jan 26, 2023 ^{IOS / AND} | Yes | Yes | Yes | Yes | Yes | Yes |
| Pulstar | SNK | 1995 | Jul 6, 2017 ^{PS4 / XBO} Dec 21, 2017 ^{NS} Apr 27, 2018 ^{PC} Dec 1, 2022 ^{IOS / AND} | Jul 6, 2017 ^{XBO} Jul 10, 2017 ^{PS4} Dec 21, 2017 ^{NS} Apr 27, 2018 ^{PC} Nov 30, 2022 ^{IOS / AND} | Jul 6, 2017 ^{PS4 / XBO} Dec 21, 2017 ^{NS} Apr 27, 2018 ^{PC} Dec 1, 2022 ^{IOS / AND} | Jul 6, 2017 ^{PS4 / XBO} Dec 21, 2017 ^{NS} Apr 27, 2018 ^{PC} Dec 1, 2022 ^{IOS / AND} | Yes | Yes | Yes | Yes | Yes | Yes |
| Puzzle Bobble | Taito | 1994 | Dec 20, 2018 ^{NS / PS4 / XBO} Oct 25, 2019 ^{PC} | Dec 20, 2018 ^{NS / XBO} Jan 3, 2019 ^{PS4} Oct 25, 2019 ^{PC} | Dec 20, 2018 ^{NS / XBO} Oct 25, 2019 ^{PC} Feb 27, 2020 ^{PS4} | Dec 20, 2018 ^{NS / PS4 / XBO} Oct 25, 2019 ^{PC} | Yes | Yes | Yes | Yes | No | No |
| Puzzle Bobble 2 | Taito | 1995 | Feb 7, 2019 ^{NS / XBO} Feb 14, 2019 ^{PS4} Nov 22, 2019 ^{PC} | Feb 7, 2019 ^{NS / PS4 / XBO} Nov 22, 2019 ^{PC} | Feb 7, 2019 ^{NS / XBO} Nov 22, 2019 ^{PC} Apr 16, 2020 ^{PS4} | Feb 7, 2019 ^{NS / XBO} Feb 14, 2019 ^{PS4} Nov 22, 2019 ^{PC} | Yes | Yes | Yes | Yes | No | No |
| Puzzled | SNK | 1990 | Aug 24, 2017 ^{NS / PS4 / XBO} Jun 29, 2018 ^{PC} Jan 24, 2022 ^{IOS / AND} | Aug 24, 2017 ^{NS / XBO} Aug 31, 2017 ^{PS4} Jun 29, 2018 ^{PC} Jan 23, 2022 ^{IOS / AND} | Aug 24, 2017 ^{NS / XBO} Sep 1, 2017 ^{PS4} Jun 29, 2018 ^{PC} Jan 24, 2022 ^{IOS / AND} | Aug 24, 2017 ^{NS / PS4 / XBO} Jun 29, 2018 ^{PC} Jan 24, 2022 ^{IOS / AND} | Yes | Yes | Yes | Yes | Yes | Yes |
| Ragnagard | SNK | 1996 | Jan 3, 2019 ^{NS} Jan 10, 2019 ^{PS4 / XBO} Aug 30, 2019 ^{PC} Aug 3, 2023 ^{IOS / AND} | Jan 3, 2019 ^{NS} Jan 10, 2019 ^{XBO} Aug 30, 2019 ^{PC} Aug 2, 2023 ^{IOS / AND} | Jan 3, 2019 ^{NS} Jan 10, 2019 ^{XBO} Aug 30, 2019 ^{PC} Aug 3, 2023 ^{IOS / AND} | Jan 3, 2019 ^{NS} Jan 10, 2019 ^{PS4 / XBO} Aug 30, 2019 ^{PC} Aug 3, 2023 ^{IOS / AND} | Yes | Yes | Yes | Yes | Yes | Yes |
| Real Bout Fatal Fury | SNK | 1995 | Oct 12, 2017 ^{PS4 / XBO} Mar 8, 2018 ^{NS} Aug 2, 2018 ^{PC} Sep 29, 2022 ^{IOS / AND} | Oct 12, 2017 ^{XBO} Oct 13, 2017 ^{PS4} Mar 8, 2018 ^{NS} Aug 2, 2018 ^{PC} Sep 28, 2022 ^{IOS / AND} | Oct 12, 2017 ^{PS4 / XBO} Mar 8, 2018 ^{NS} Aug 2, 2018 ^{PC} Sep 29, 2022 ^{IOS / AND} | Oct 12, 2017 ^{XBO} Oct 18, 2017 ^{PS4} Mar 8, 2018 ^{NS} Aug 2, 2018 ^{PC} Sep 29, 2022 ^{IOS / AND} | Yes | Yes | Yes | Yes | Yes | Yes |
| Real Bout Fatal Fury Special | SNK | 1997 | Dec 14, 2017 ^{PS4 / XBO} Apr 19, 2018 ^{NS} Sep 28, 2018 ^{PC} Mar 2, 2023 ^{IOS / AND} | Dec 14, 2017 ^{XBO} Jan 8, 2018 ^{PS4} Apr 19, 2018 ^{NS} Sep 28, 2018 ^{PC} Mar 1, 2023 ^{IOS / AND} | Dec 14, 2017 ^{XBO} Jan 5, 2018 ^{PS4} Apr 19, 2018 ^{NS} Sep 28, 2018 ^{PC} Mar 2, 2023 ^{IOS / AND} | Dec 14, 2017 ^{PS4 / XBO} Apr 19, 2018 ^{NS} Sep 28, 2018 ^{PC} Mar 2, 2023 ^{IOS / AND} | Yes | Yes | Yes | Yes | Yes | Yes |
| Real Bout Fatal Fury 2: The Newcomers | SNK | 1998 | Mar 8, 2018 ^{PS4 / XBO} Aug 16, 2018 ^{NS} Nov 30, 2018 ^{PC} May 25, 2023 ^{IOS / AND} | Mar 8, 2018 ^{XBO} Aug 16, 2018 ^{NS} Nov 30, 2018 ^{PC} Jan 30, 2019 ^{PS4} May 24, 2023 ^{IOS / AND} | Mar 8, 2018 ^{XBO} Apr 24, 2018 ^{PS4} Aug 16, 2018 ^{NS} Nov 30, 2018 ^{PC} May 25, 2023 ^{IOS / AND} | Mar 8, 2018 ^{PS4 / XBO} Aug 16, 2018 ^{NS} Nov 30, 2018 ^{PC} May 25, 2023 ^{IOS / AND} | Yes | Yes | Yes | Yes | Yes | Yes |
| Riding Hero | SNK | 1990 | Jun 7, 2018 ^{NS / PS4 / XBO} Mar 8, 2019 ^{PC} Apr 20, 2023 ^{IOS / AND} | Jun 7, 2018 ^{NS / XBO} Feb 5, 2019 ^{PS4} Mar 8, 2019 ^{PC} Apr 19, 2023 ^{IOS / AND} | Jun 7, 2018 ^{NS / XBO} Mar 8, 2019 ^{PC} Apr 20, 2023 ^{IOS / AND} | Jun 7, 2018 ^{NS / PS4 / XBO} Mar 8, 2019 ^{PC} Apr 20, 2023 ^{IOS / AND} | Yes | Yes | Yes | Yes | Yes | Yes |
| Robo Army | SNK | 1991 | Oct 19, 2017 ^{NS / PS4 / XBO} Aug 2, 2018 ^{PC} Jun 30, 2022 ^{IOS / AND} | Oct 19, 2017 ^{NS / PS4 / XBO} Aug 2, 2018 ^{PC} Jun 29, 2022 ^{IOS / AND} | Oct 19, 2017 ^{NS / XBO} Nov 2, 2017 ^{PS4} Aug 2, 2018 ^{PC} Jun 30, 2022 ^{IOS / AND} | Oct 19, 2017 ^{NS / PS4 / XBO} Aug 2, 2018 ^{PC} Jun 30, 2022 ^{IOS / AND} | Yes | Yes | Yes | Yes | Yes | Yes |
| Samurai Shodown | SNK | 1993 | Dec 8, 2016 ^{PS4} May 2, 2017 ^{XBO} Jul 20, 2017 ^{NS} Feb 28, 2018 ^{PC} Mar 24, 2022 ^{IOS / AND} | Dec 9, 2016 ^{PS4} May 2, 2017 ^{XBO} Jul 20, 2017 ^{NS} Feb 28, 2018 ^{PC} Mar 23, 2022 ^{IOS / AND} | Dec 8, 2016 ^{PS4} May 2, 2017 ^{XBO} Jul 20, 2017 ^{NS} Feb 28, 2018 ^{PC} Mar 24, 2022 ^{IOS / AND} | Dec 8, 2016 ^{PS4} May 2, 2017 ^{XBO} Jul 20, 2017 ^{NS} Feb 28, 2018 ^{PC} Mar 24, 2022 ^{IOS / AND} | Yes | Yes | Yes | Yes | Yes | Yes |
| Samurai Shodown II | SNK | 1994 | Sep 21, 2017 ^{PS4 / XBO} Feb 1, 2018 ^{NS} Jun 29, 2018 ^{PC} Nov 16, 2023 ^{IOS / AND} | Sep 21, 2017 ^{XBO} Oct 11, 2017 ^{PS4} Feb 1, 2018 ^{NS} Jun 29, 2018 ^{PC} Nov 15, 2023 ^{IOS / AND} | Sep 21, 2017 ^{XBO} Oct 10, 2017 ^{PS4} Feb 1, 2018 ^{NS} Jun 29, 2018 ^{PC} Nov 16, 2023 ^{IOS / AND} | Sep 21, 2017 ^{PS4 / XBO} Feb 1, 2018 ^{NS} Jun 29, 2018 ^{PC} Nov 16, 2023 ^{IOS / AND} | Yes | Yes | Yes | Yes | Yes | Yes |
| Samurai Shodown III: Blades of Blood | SNK | 1995 | Feb 1, 2018 ^{PS4 / XBO} Apr 5, 2018 ^{NS} Oct 26, 2018 ^{PC} Feb 16, 2023 ^{IOS / AND} | Feb 1, 2018 ^{XBO} Apr 5, 2018 ^{NS} Apr 19, 2018 ^{PS4} Oct 26, 2018 ^{PC} Feb 15, 2023 ^{IOS / AND} | Feb 1, 2018 ^{XBO} Apr 5, 2018 ^{NS} Apr 19, 2018 ^{PS4} Oct 26, 2018 ^{PC} Feb 16, 2023 ^{IOS / AND} | Feb 1, 2018 ^{PS4 / XBO} Apr 5, 2018 ^{NS} Oct 26, 2018 ^{PC} Feb 16, 2023 ^{IOS / AND} | Yes | Yes | Yes | Yes | Yes | Yes |
| Samurai Shodown IV: Amakusa's Revenge | SNK | 1996 | Apr 13, 2017 ^{NS} Apr 19, 2018 ^{PS4 / XBO} Dec 21, 2018 ^{PC} Nov 30, 2021 ^{IOS / AND} | Apr 13, 2017 ^{NS} Apr 19, 2018 ^{XBO} Jun 8, 2018 ^{PS4} Dec 21, 2018 ^{PC} Nov 30, 2021 ^{IOS / AND} | Apr 13, 2017 ^{NS} Apr 19, 2018 ^{XBO} Jun 8, 2018 ^{PS4} Dec 21, 2018 ^{PC} Nov 30, 2021 ^{IOS / AND} | Apr 13, 2017 ^{NS} Apr 19, 2018 ^{PS4 / XBO} Dec 21, 2018 ^{PC} Nov 30, 2021 ^{IOS / AND} | Yes | Yes | Yes | Yes | Yes | Yes |
| Samurai Shodown V | SNK | 2003 | Jul 5, 2018 ^{NS / PS4 / XBO} Apr 26, 2019 ^{PC} Sep 15, 2022 ^{IOS / AND} | Jul 5, 2018 ^{NS / XBO} Mar 12, 2019 ^{PS4} Apr 26, 2019 ^{PC} Sep 14, 2022 ^{IOS / AND} | Jul 5, 2018 ^{NS / XBO} Apr 26, 2019 ^{PC} Sep 15, 2022 ^{IOS / AND} | Jul 5, 2018 ^{NS / PS4 / XBO} Apr 26, 2019 ^{PC} Sep 15, 2022 ^{IOS / AND} | Yes | Yes | Yes | Yes | Yes | Yes |
| Samurai Shodown V Special | SNK | 2004 | Apr 18, 2019 ^{NS / PS4 / XBO} Dec 20, 2019 ^{PC} Oct 27, 2022 ^{IOS / AND} | Apr 18, 2019 ^{NS / XBO} Apr 19, 2019 ^{PS4} Dec 20, 2019 ^{PC} Oct 26, 2022 ^{IOS / AND} | Apr 18, 2019 ^{NS / XBO} Dec 20, 2019 ^{PC} Oct 27, 2022 ^{IOS / AND} | Apr 18, 2019 ^{NS / PS4 / XBO} Dec 20, 2019 ^{PC} Oct 27, 2022 ^{IOS / AND} | Yes | Yes | Yes | Yes | Yes | Yes |
| Savage Reign | SNK | 1995 | Oct 25, 2018 ^{NS / PS4 / XBO} Aug 9, 2019 ^{PC} Apr 27, 2023 ^{IOS / AND} | Oct 25, 2018 ^{NS / XBO} Jul 16, 2019 ^{PS4} Aug 9, 2019 ^{PC} Apr 26, 2023 ^{IOS / AND} | Oct 25, 2018 ^{NS / XBO} Aug 9, 2019 ^{PC} Apr 27, 2023 ^{IOS / AND} | Oct 25, 2018 ^{NS / PS4 / XBO} Aug 9, 2019 ^{PC} Apr 27, 2023 ^{IOS / AND} | Yes | Yes | Yes | Yes | Yes | Yes |
| Sengoku | SNK | 1991 | Mar 16, 2017 ^{PS4 / XBO} Jun 15, 2017 ^{NS} Dec 15, 2017 ^{PC} Mar 31, 2022 ^{IOS / AND} | Mar 16, 2017 ^{PS4 / XBO} Jun 15, 2017 ^{NS} Dec 15, 2017 ^{PC} Mar 30, 2022 ^{IOS / AND} | Mar 16, 2017 ^{PS4 / XBO} Jun 15, 2017 ^{NS} Dec 15, 2017 ^{PC} Mar 31, 2022^{IOS / AND} | Mar 16, 2017 ^{PS4 / XBO} Jun 15, 2017 ^{NS} Dec 15, 2017 ^{PC} Mar 31, 2022 ^{IOS / AND} | Yes | Yes | Yes | Yes | Yes | Yes |
| Sengoku 2 | SNK | 1993 | Apr 13, 2017 ^{XBO} Jun 8, 2017 ^{PS4} Mar 1, 2018 ^{NS} May 25, 2018 ^{PC} Jan 19, 2023 ^{IOS / AND} | Apr 13, 2017 ^{XBO} Jun 15, 2017 ^{PS4} Mar 1, 2018 ^{NS} May 25, 2018 ^{PC} Jan 18, 2023 ^{IOS / AND} | Apr 13, 2017 ^{XBO} Jun 16, 2017 ^{PS4} Mar 1, 2018 ^{NS} May 25, 2018 ^{PC} Jan 19, 2023 ^{IOS / AND} | Apr 13, 2017 ^{XBO} Jun 29, 2017 ^{PS4} Mar 1, 2018 ^{NS} May 25, 2018 ^{PC} Jan 19, 2023 ^{IOS / AND} | Yes | Yes | Yes | Yes | Yes | Yes |
| Sengoku 3 | SNK | 2001 | Mar 29, 2018 ^{NS / PS4 / XBO} Nov 30, 2018 ^{PC} Feb 9, 2023 ^{IOS / AND} | Mar 29, 2018 ^{NS / XBO} Jun 13, 2018 ^{PS4} Nov 30, 2018 ^{PC} Feb 8, 2023 ^{IOS / AND} | Mar 29, 2018 ^{NS / XBO} Jun 13, 2018 ^{PS4} Nov 30, 2018 ^{PC} Feb 9, 2023 ^{IOS / AND} | Mar 29, 2018 ^{NS / PS4 / XBO} Nov 30, 2018 ^{PC} Feb 9, 2023 ^{IOS / AND} | Yes | Yes | Yes | Yes | Yes | Yes |
| Shock Troopers | SNK | 1997 | Mar 3, 2017 ^{NS} Jan 25, 2018 ^{PS4 / XBO} Oct 26, 2018 ^{PC} Dec 16, 2021 ^{IOS / AND} | Mar 9, 2017 ^{NS} Jan 25, 2018 ^{PS4 / XBO} Oct 26, 2018 ^{PC} Dec 15, 2021 ^{IOS / AND} | Mar 3, 2017 ^{NS} Jan 25, 2018 ^{PS4 / XBO} Oct 26, 2018 ^{PC} Dec 16, 2021 ^{IOS / AND} | Mar 3, 2017 ^{NS} Jan 25, 2018 ^{PS4 / XBO} Oct 26, 2018 ^{PC} Dec 16, 2021 ^{IOS / AND} | Yes | Yes | Yes | Yes | Yes | Yes |
| Shock Troopers: 2nd Squad | SNK | 1998 | Jun 8, 2017 ^{NS} Mar 1, 2018 ^{PS4 / XBO} Nov 30, 2018 ^{PC} Apr 14, 2022 ^{IOS / AND} | Jun 8, 2017 ^{NS} Mar 1, 2018 ^{XBO} Jun 6, 2018 ^{PS4} Nov 30, 2018 ^{PC} Apr 13, 2022 ^{IOS / AND} | Jun 8, 2017 ^{NS} Mar 1, 2018 ^{XBO} Apr 19, 2018 ^{PS4} Nov 30, 2018 ^{PC} Apr 14, 2022 ^{IOS / AND} | Jun 8, 2017 ^{NS} Mar 1, 2018 ^{PS4 / XBO} Nov 30, 2018 ^{PC} Apr 14, 2022 ^{IOS / AND} | Yes | Yes | Yes | Yes | Yes | Yes |
| Soccer Brawl | SNK | 1992 | Nov 22, 2017 ^{NS / PS4 / XBO} Aug 31, 2018 ^{PC} Jul 28, 2022 ^{IOS / AND} | Nov 22, 2017 ^{NS / XBO} Dec 7, 2017 ^{PS4} Aug 31, 2018 ^{PC} Jul 27, 2022 ^{IOS / AND} | Nov 22, 2017 ^{NS / XBO} Dec 1, 2017 ^{PS4} Aug 31, 2018 ^{PC} Jul 28, 2022 ^{IOS / AND} | Nov 22, 2017 ^{NS / PS4 / XBO} Aug 31, 2018 ^{PC} Jul 28, 2022 ^{IOS / AND} | Yes | Yes | Yes | Yes | Yes | Yes |
| Spinmaster | Data East | 1993 | Sep 14, 2017 ^{NS / PS4 / XBO} Jun 29, 2018 ^{PC} | Sep 14, 2017 ^{NS / PS4 / XBO} Jun 29, 2018 ^{PC} | Sep 14, 2017 ^{NS / XBO} Sep 15, 2017 ^{PS4} Jun 29, 2018 ^{PC} | Sep 14, 2017 ^{NS / PS4 / XBO} Jun 29, 2018 ^{PC} | Yes | Yes | Yes | Yes | No | No |
| Stakes Winner | SNK | 1995 | May 2, 2018 ^{NS / PS4 / XBO} Dec 21, 2018 ^{PC} Mar 16, 2023 ^{IOS / AND} | May 2, 2018 ^{NS / XBO} Jun 8, 2018 ^{PS4} Dec 21, 2018 ^{PC} Mar 15, 2023 ^{IOS / AND} | May 2, 2018 ^{NS / XBO} Jun 22, 2018 ^{PS4} Dec 21, 2018 ^{PC} Mar 16, 2023 ^{IOS / AND} | May 2, 2018 ^{NS / PS4 / XBO} Dec 21, 2018 ^{PC} Mar 16, 2023 ^{IOS / AND} | Yes | Yes | Yes | Yes | Yes | Yes |
| Stakes Winner 2 | SNK | 1996 | Nov 15, 2018 ^{NS / PS4 / XBO} Sep 13, 2019 ^{PC} Jul 13, 2023 ^{IOS / AND} | Nov 15, 2018 ^{NS / XBO} May 21, 2019 ^{PS4} Sep 13, 2019 ^{PC} Jul 12, 2023 ^{IOS / AND} | Nov 15, 2018 ^{NS / XBO} Sep 13, 2019 ^{PC} Jul 13, 2023 ^{IOS / AND} | Nov 15, 2018 ^{NS / PS4 / XBO} Sep 13, 2019 ^{PC} Jul 13, 2023 ^{IOS / AND} | Yes | Yes | Yes | Yes | Yes | Yes |
| Street Hoop | Data East | 1994 | Nov 9, 2017 ^{NS / XBO} Aug 31, 2018 ^{PC} Oct 18, 2018 ^{PS4} | Nov 9, 2017 ^{NS / PS4 / XBO} Aug 31, 2018 ^{PC} | Nov 9, 2017 ^{NS / PS4 / XBO} Aug 31, 2018 ^{PC} | Nov 9, 2017 ^{NS / XBO} Aug 31, 2018 ^{PC} Oct 18, 2018 ^{PS4} | Yes | Yes | Yes | Yes | No | No |
| Strikers 1945 Plus | Psikyo | 1999 | Oct 18, 2018 ^{NS / PS4 / XBO} Aug 16, 2019 ^{PC} | Oct 18, 2018 ^{NS / XBO} Jul 1, 2019 ^{PS4} Aug 16, 2019 ^{PC} | Oct 18, 2018 ^{XBO} Oct 22, 2018 ^{NS} Aug 16, 2019 ^{PC} | Oct 18, 2018 ^{NS / PS4 / XBO} Aug 16, 2019 ^{PC} | Yes | Yes | Yes | Yes | No | No |
| Super Baseball 2020 | SNK | 1991 | Jun 29, 2017 ^{PS4 / XBO} Feb 8, 2018 ^{NS} Apr 27, 2018 ^{PC} Dec 22, 2022 ^{IOS / AND} | Jun 29, 2017 ^{PS4 / XBO} Feb 8, 2018 ^{NS} Apr 27, 2018 ^{PC} Dec 21, 2022 ^{IOS / AND} | Jun 29, 2017 ^{PS4 / XBO} Feb 8, 2018 ^{NS} Apr 27, 2018 ^{PC} Dec 22, 2022 ^{IOS / AND} | Jun 29, 2017 ^{PS4 / XBO} Feb 8, 2018 ^{NS} Apr 27, 2018 ^{PC} Dec 22, 2022 ^{IOS / AND} | Yes | Yes | Yes | Yes | Yes | Yes |
| Super Sidekicks | SNK | 1992 | Jul 27, 2017 ^{NS / PS4 / XBO} May 25, 2018 ^{PC} Apr 21, 2022 ^{IOS / AND} | Jul 27, 2017 ^{NS / XBO} Jul 28, 2017 ^{PS4} May 25, 2018 ^{PC} Apr 20, 2022 ^{IOS / AND} | Jul 27, 2017 ^{NS / XBO} Aug 2, 2017 ^{PS4} May 25, 2018 ^{PC} Apr 21, 2022 ^{IOS / AND} | Jul 27, 2017 ^{NS / PS4 / XBO} May 25, 2018 ^{PC} Apr 21, 2022 ^{IOS / AND} | Yes | Yes | Yes | Yes | Yes | Yes |
| Super Sidekicks 2: The World Championship | SNK | 1994 | May 10, 2018 ^{NS / PS4 / XBO} Jan 25, 2019 ^{PC} | May 10, 2018 ^{NS / XBO} Jun 8, 2018 ^{PS4} Jan 25, 2019 ^{PC} | May 10, 2018 ^{NS / XBO} Jun 22, 2018 ^{PS4} Jan 25, 2019 ^{PC} | May 10, 2018 ^{NS / PS4 / XBO} Jan 25, 2019 ^{PC} | Yes | Yes | Yes | Yes | No | No |
| Super Sidekicks 3: The Next Glory | SNK | 1995 | Jun 14, 2018 ^{NS / PS4 / XBO} May 3, 2019 ^{PC} | Jun 14, 2018 ^{NS / XBO} May 3, 2019 ^{PC} | Jun 14, 2018 ^{NS / XBO} May 3, 2019 ^{PC} | Jun 14, 2018 ^{NS / PS4 / XBO} May 3, 2019 ^{PC} | Yes | Yes | Yes | Yes | No | No |
| The Super Spy | SNK | 1990 | Jul 12, 2018 ^{NS / PS4 / XBO} Apr 12, 2019 ^{PC} May 11, 2023 ^{IOS / AND} | Jul 12, 2018 ^{NS / XBO} Apr 12, 2019 ^{PC} May 10, 2023 ^{IOS / AND} | Jul 12, 2018 ^{NS / XBO} Apr 12, 2019 ^{PC} May 11, 2023 ^{IOS / AND} | Jul 12, 2018 ^{NS / PS4 / XBO} Apr 12, 2019 ^{PC} May 11, 2023 ^{IOS / AND} | Yes | Yes | Yes | Yes | Yes | Yes |
| Thrash Rally | SNK | 1991 | Nov 8, 2018 ^{NS / PS4 / XBO} Sep 6, 2019 ^{PC} Jul 6, 2023 ^{IOS / AND} | Nov 8, 2018 ^{NS / XBO} Jul 25, 2019 ^{PS4} Sep 6, 2019 ^{PC} Jul 5, 2023 ^{IOS / AND} | Nov 8, 2018 ^{NS / XBO} Sep 6, 2019 ^{PC} Jul 6, 2023 ^{IOS / AND} | Nov 8, 2018 ^{NS / PS4 / XBO} Sep 6, 2019 ^{PC} Jul 6, 2023 ^{IOS / AND} | Yes | Yes | Yes | Yes | Yes | Yes |
| Top Hunter: Roddy & Cathy | SNK | 1994 | Dec 7, 2017 ^{NS / PS4 / XBO} Sep 28, 2018 ^{PC} Nov 25, 2022 ^{IOS / AND} | Dec 7, 2017 ^{NS / XBO} Jan 8, 2018 ^{PS4} Sep 28, 2018 ^{PC} Nov 24, 2022 ^{IOS / AND} | Dec 7, 2017 ^{NS / XBO} Jan 5, 2018 ^{PS4} Sep 28, 2018 ^{PC} Nov 25, 2022 ^{IOS / AND} | Dec 7, 2017 ^{NS / PS4 / XBO} Sep 28, 2018 ^{PC} Nov 25, 2022 ^{IOS / AND} | Yes | Yes | Yes | Yes | Yes | Yes |
| Top Player's Golf | SNK | 1990 | May 24, 2018 ^{NS / PS4 / XBO} Feb 15, 2019 ^{PC} Apr 6, 2023 ^{IOS / AND} | May 24, 2018 ^{NS / XBO} Feb 15, 2019 ^{PC} Mar 5, 2019 ^{PS4} Apr 5, 2023 ^{IOS / AND} | May 24, 2018 ^{NS / XBO} Feb 15, 2019 ^{PC} Apr 6, 2023 ^{IOS / AND} | May 24, 2018 ^{NS / PS4 / XBO} Feb 15, 2019 ^{PC} Apr 6, 2023 ^{IOS / AND} | Yes | Yes | Yes | Yes | Yes | Yes |
| Twinkle Star Sprites | SNK | 1996 | Dec 6, 2018 ^{NS / XBO} Dec 11, 2018 ^{PS4} Oct 18, 2019 ^{PC} Sep 1, 2022 ^{IOS / AND} | Dec 6, 2018 ^{NS / XBO} Oct 18, 2019 ^{PC} Aug 31, 2022 ^{IOS / AND} | Dec 6, 2018 ^{NS / XBO} Oct 18, 2019 ^{PC} Sep 1, 2022 ^{IOS / AND} | Dec 6, 2018 ^{NS / XBO} Dec 11, 2018 ^{PS4} Oct 18, 2019 ^{PC} Sep 1, 2022 ^{IOS / AND} | Yes | Yes | Yes | Yes | Yes | Yes |
| The Ultimate 11: SNK Football Championship | SNK | 1996 | Feb 28, 2019 ^{NS / PS4 / XBO} Dec 6, 2019 ^{PC} | Feb 28, 2019 ^{NS / XBO} May 29, 2019 ^{PS4} Dec 6, 2019 ^{PC} | Feb 28, 2019 ^{NS / XBO} Dec 6, 2019 ^{PC} | Feb 28, 2019 ^{NS / PS4 / XBO} Dec 6, 2019 ^{PC} | Yes | Yes | Yes | Yes | No | No |
| Waku Waku 7 | Sunsoft | 1996 | Mar 3, 2017 ^{NS} Mar 22, 2018 ^{PS4 / XBO} Dec 3, 2018 ^{PC} | Mar 9, 2017 ^{NS} Mar 22, 2018 ^{XBO} Dec 3, 2018 ^{PC} Feb 28, 2019 ^{PS4} | Mar 3, 2017 ^{NS} Mar 22, 2018 ^{XBO} Dec 3, 2018 ^{PC} Mar 17, 2020 ^{PS4} | Mar 3, 2017 ^{NS} Mar 22, 2018 ^{PS4 / XBO} Dec 3, 2018 ^{PC} | Yes | Yes | Yes | Yes | No | No |
| World Heroes | SNK | 1992 | Jan 26, 2017 ^{PS4} Feb 23, 2017 ^{XBO} Nov 30, 2017 ^{NS} Dec 15, 2017 ^{PC} May 19, 2022 ^{IOS / AND} | Jan 26, 2017 ^{PS4} Feb 23, 2017 ^{XBO} Nov 30, 2017 ^{NS} Dec 15, 2017 ^{PC} May 18, 2022 ^{IOS / AND} | Jan 26, 2017 ^{PS4} Feb 23, 2017 ^{XBO} Nov 30, 2017 ^{NS} Dec 15, 2017 ^{PC} May 19, 2022 ^{IOS / AND} | Jan 26, 2017 ^{PS4} Feb 23, 2017 ^{XBO} Nov 30, 2017 ^{NS} Dec 15, 2017 ^{PC} May 19, 2022 ^{IOS / AND} | Yes | Yes | Yes | Yes | Yes | Yes |
| World Heroes 2 | SNK | 1993 | May 25, 2017 ^{PS4 / XBO} Jan 25, 2018 ^{NS} Feb 28, 2018 ^{PC} Dec 15, 2022 ^{IOS / AND} | May 25, 2017 ^{PS4 / XBO} Jan 25, 2018 ^{NS} Feb 28, 2018 ^{PC} Dec 14, 2022 ^{IOS / AND} | May 25, 2017 ^{PS4 / XBO} Jan 25, 2018 ^{NS} Feb 28, 2018 ^{PC} Dec 15, 2022 ^{IOS / AND} | May 25, 2017 ^{PS4 / XBO} Jan 25, 2018 ^{NS} Feb 28, 2018 ^{PC} Dec 15, 2022 ^{IOS / AND} | Yes | Yes | Yes | Yes | Yes | Yes |
| World Heroes 2 Jet | SNK | 1994 | Nov 30, 2017 ^{PS4 / XBO} Mar 22, 2018 ^{NS} Aug 31, 2018 ^{PC} Feb 2, 2023 ^{IOS / AND} | Nov 30, 2017 ^{XBO} Jan 30, 2018 ^{PS4} Mar 22, 2018 ^{NS} Aug 31, 2018 ^{PC} Feb 1, 2023 ^{IOS / AND} | Nov 30, 2017 ^{XBO} Jan 5, 2018 ^{PS4} Mar 22, 2018 ^{NS} Aug 31, 2018 ^{PC} Feb 2, 2023 ^{IOS / AND} | Nov 30, 2017 ^{PS4 / XBO} Mar 22, 2018 ^{NS} Aug 31, 2018 ^{PC} Feb 2, 2023 ^{IOS / AND} | Yes | Yes | Yes | Yes | Yes | Yes |
| World Heroes Perfect | SNK | 1995 | Mar 3, 2017 ^{NS} Jan 31, 2019 ^{PS4 / XBO} Nov 15, 2019 ^{PC} Feb 24, 2022 ^{IOS / AND} | Mar 9, 2017 ^{NS} Jan 31, 2019 ^{XBO} Feb 4, 2019 ^{PS4} Nov 15, 2019 ^{PC} Feb 23, 2022 ^{IOS / AND} | Mar 3, 2017 ^{NS} Jan 31, 2019 ^{XBO} Nov 15, 2019 ^{PC} Feb 24, 2022 ^{IOS / AND} | Mar 3, 2017 ^{NS} Jan 31, 2019 ^{PS4 / XBO} Nov 15, 2019 ^{PC} Feb 24, 2022 ^{IOS / AND} | Yes | Yes | Yes | Yes | Yes | Yes |
| Zed Blade | NMK | 1994 | Jul 20, 2017 ^{XBO} Aug 10, 2017 ^{PS4} Aug 31, 2017 ^{NS} Feb 28, 2018 ^{PC} Jan 13, 2022 ^{IOS / AND} | Jul 20, 2017 ^{XBO} Aug 30, 2017 ^{PS4} Aug 31, 2017 ^{NS} Feb 28, 2018 ^{PC} Jan 12, 2022 ^{IOS / AND} | Jul 20, 2017 ^{XBO} Aug 31, 2017 ^{NS} Sep 7, 2017 ^{PS4} Feb 28, 2018 ^{PC} Jan 13, 2022 ^{IOS / AND} | Jul 20, 2017 ^{XBO} Aug 10, 2017 ^{PS4} Aug 31, 2017 ^{NS} Feb 28, 2018 ^{PC} Jan 13, 2022 ^{IOS / AND} | Yes | Yes | Yes | Yes | Yes | Yes |
| ZuPaPa! | SNK | 2001 | Oct 4, 2018 ^{NS / PS4 / XBO} Jul 26, 2019 ^{PC} Aug 31, 2023 ^{IOS / AND} | Oct 4, 2018 ^{NS / XBO} Jul 2, 2019 ^{PS4} Jul 26, 2019 ^{PC} Aug 30, 2023 ^{IOS / AND} | Oct 4, 2018 ^{NS / XBO} Jul 26, 2019 ^{PC} Aug 31, 2023 ^{IOS / AND} | Oct 4, 2018 ^{NS / PS4 / XBO} Jul 26, 2019 ^{PC} Aug 31, 2023 ^{IOS / AND} | Yes | Yes | Yes | Yes | Yes | Yes |

=== ACA2 Neo Geo ===
Titles in the ACA2 Neo Geo series
| Title | Company | Original release | ACA2 Release date | | | | ACA2 Platforms | |
| Title | Company | Original release | JP | NA | EU/AU | Asia | PS5 | XSXS |
|---|---|---|---|---|---|---|---|---|
| The King of Fighters '98: The Slugfest | SNK | 1998 | Feb 27, 2025 | Feb 27, 2025 | Feb 27, 2025 | Feb 27, 2025 | Yes | Yes |

=== Console Archives ===
Titles in the Console Archives series
| Title | Company | Original release | Original system | CSA Release date | | | | CSA Platforms | |
| Title | Company | Original release | Original system | JP | NA | EU/AU | Asia | NS2 | PS5 |
|---|---|---|---|---|---|---|---|---|---|
| Bokosuka Wars | ASCII Corporation | 1985 | NES | Jun 25, 2026 | Jun 25, 2026 | Jun 25, 2026 | Jun 25, 2026 | Yes | Yes |
| Bubble Bobble | Taito | 1988 | NES | Aug 27, 2026 | Aug 27, 2026 | Aug 27, 2026 | Aug 27, 2026 | Yes | Yes |
| Chack'n Pop | Taito | 1985 | NES | Oct 1, 2026 | Oct 1, 2026 | Oct 1, 2026 | Oct 1, 2026 | Yes | Yes |
| The Conveni | Human Entertainment | 1997 | PlayStation | Jul 23, 2026 | Jul 23, 2026 | Jul 23, 2026 | Jul 23, 2026 | Yes | Yes |
| The Conveni 2 | Human Entertainment | 1997 | PlayStation | Sep 3, 2026 | Sep 3, 2026 | Sep 3, 2026 | Sep 3, 2026 | Yes | Yes |
| Cool Boarders | UEP Systems | 1996 | PlayStation | Feb 5, 2026 ^{NS2} Feb 14, 2026 ^{PS5} | Feb 5, 2026 ^{NS2} Feb 14, 2026 ^{PS5} | Feb 5, 2026 ^{NS2} Feb 14, 2026 ^{PS5} | Feb 5, 2026 ^{NS2} Feb 14, 2026 ^{PS5} | Yes | Yes |
| Crazy Climber | Nichibutsu | 1986 | NES | Sep 17, 2026 | Sep 17, 2026 | Sep 17, 2026 | Sep 17, 2026 | Yes | Yes |
| Dezaemon | Athena | 1991 | NES | Feb 19, 2026 | Feb 19, 2026 | Feb 19, 2026 | Feb 19, 2026 | Yes | Yes |
| Dezaemon Plus | Athena | 1995 | PlayStation | TBA | TBA | TBA | TBA | Yes | Yes |
| Doraemon (Note: Also sold for the Nintendo Switch through a limited reprint of Shogakukan's walkthrough book.) | Hudson Soft | 1986 | NES | Jul 30, 2026 | Jul 30, 2026 | Jul 30, 2026 | Jul 30, 2026 | Yes | Yes |
| The Drug Store | Human Entertainment | 1998 | PlayStation | Oct 15, 2026 | Oct 15, 2026 | Oct 15, 2026 | Oct 15, 2026 | Yes | Yes |
| Elevator Action | Taito | 1985 | NES | Nov 5, 2026 | Nov 5, 2026 | Nov 5, 2026 | Nov 5, 2026 | Yes | Yes |
| The Firemen 2: Pete & Danny | Human Entertainment | 1995 | PlayStation | Nov 19, 2026 | Nov 19, 2026 | Nov 19, 2026 | Nov 19, 2026 | Yes | Yes |
| Firework Thrower Kantaro's 53 Stations of the Tokaido | Sunsoft | 1986 | NES | Jun 4, 2026 | Jun 4, 2026 | Jun 4, 2026 | Jun 4, 2026 | Yes | Yes |
| Geki-Oh Shienryu | Warashi | 1999 | PlayStation | May 28, 2026 | May 28, 2026 | May 28, 2026 | May 28, 2026 | Yes | Yes |
| Hercules no Eikō II: Titan no Metsubō | Data East | 1989 | NES | Jul 16, 2026 | Jul 16, 2026 | July 16, 2026 | July 16, 2026 | Yes | Yes |
| Ishin no Arashi | Koei | 1990 | NES | Apr 16, 2026 | Apr 16, 2026 | Apr 16, 2026 | Apr 16, 2026 | Yes | Yes |
| Karate Champ | Data East | 1986 | NES | Sep 24, 2026 | Sep 24, 2026 | Sep 24, 2026 | Sep 24, 2026 | Yes | Yes |
| L'Empereur | Koei | 1991 | NES | Jun 11, 2026 | Jun 11, 2026 | Jun 11, 2026 | Jun 11, 2026 | Yes | Yes |
| The Legend of Kage | Taito | 1986 | NES | Jun 18, 2026 | Jun 18, 2026 | Jun 18, 2026 | Jun 18, 2026 | Yes | Yes |
| MagMax | Nichibutsu | 1986 | NES | May 7, 2026 | May 7, 2026 | May 7, 2026 | May 7, 2026 | Yes | Yes |
| Marl Jong!! | Nippon Ichi Software | 2003 | PlayStation | Oct 29, 2026 | Oct 29, 2026 | Oct 29, 2026 | Oct 29, 2026 | Yes | Yes |
| Master of Monsters: Disciples of Gaia | Toshiba EMI | 1997 | PlayStation | May 14, 2026 | May 14, 2026 ^{PS5} May 15, 2026 ^{NS2} | May 14, 2026 ^{PS5} May 15, 2026 ^{NS2} | May 14, 2026 | Yes | Yes |
| Monster Rancher Hop-A-Bout | Tecmo | 2000 | PlayStation | TBA | TBA | TBA | TBA | Yes | Yes |
| Ninja Gaiden II: The Dark Sword of Chaos | Tecmo | 1990 | NES | Feb 5, 2026 ^{NS2} Feb 14, 2026 ^{PS5} | Feb 5, 2026 ^{NS2} Feb 14, 2026 ^{PS5} | Feb 5, 2026 ^{NS2} Feb 14, 2026 ^{PS5} | Feb 5, 2026 ^{NS2} Feb 14, 2026 ^{PS5} | Yes | Yes |
| Ninja Gaiden III: The Ancient Ship of Doom | Tecmo | 1991 | NES | Apr 23, 2026 | Apr 23, 2026 | Apr 23, 2026 | Apr 23, 2026 | Yes | Yes |
| Ninja-Kid II | UPL | 1988 | NES | Mar 19, 2026 | Mar 19, 2026 | Mar 19, 2026 | Mar 19, 2026 | Yes | Yes |
| Nobunaga Oda Den | Koei | 1998 | PlayStation | Nov 12, 2026 | Nov 12, 2026 | Nov 12, 2026 | Nov 12, 2026 | Yes | Yes |
| Nobunaga's Ambition | Koei | 1988 | NES | Mar 5, 2026 | Mar 5, 2026 | Mar 5, 2026 | Mar 5, 2026 | Yes | Yes |
| Nobunaga's Ambition II | Koei | 1990 | NES | Sep 10, 2026 | Sep 10, 2026 | Sep 10, 2026 | Sep 10, 2026 | Yes | Yes |
| The Raiden Project | Seibu Kaihatsu | 1995 | PlayStation | Oct 22, 2026 | Oct 22, 2026 | Oct 22, 2026 | Oct 22, 2026 | Yes | Yes |
| Rhapsody: A Musical Adventure | Nippon Ichi Software | 1998 | PlayStation | Jul 9, 2026 | Jul 9, 2026 | Jul 9, 2026 | Jul 9, 2026 | Yes | Yes |
| Rhapsody II: Ballad of the Little Princess | Nippon Ichi Software | 1999 | PlayStation | Aug 20, 2026 | Aug 20, 2026 | Aug 20, 2026 | Aug 20, 2026 | Yes | Yes |
| Ripple Island | Sunsoft | 1988 | NES | Oct 8, 2026 | Oct 8, 2026 | Oct 8, 2026 | Oct 8, 2026 | Yes | Yes |
| Rohga: Armor Force | Data East | 1996 | PlayStation | Apr 30, 2026 | Apr 30, 2026 | Apr 30, 2026 | Apr 30, 2026 | Yes | Yes |
| Seicross | Nichibutsu | 1986 | NES | Apr 9, 2026 | Apr 9, 2026 | Apr 9, 2026 | Apr 9, 2026 | Yes | Yes |
| Sonic Wings Special | Video System | 1996 | PlayStation | Mar 12, 2026 | Mar 12, 2026 | Mar 12, 2026 | Mar 12, 2026 | Yes | Yes |
| T.R.A.G. (Hard Edge) | Sunsoft | 1998 | PlayStation | Jul 2, 2026 | Jul 2, 2026 | Jul 2, 2026 | Jul 2, 2026 | Yes | Yes |
| Terra Cresta | Nichibutsu | 1986 | NES | Mar 26, 2026 | Mar 26, 2026 | Mar 26, 2026 | Mar 26, 2026 | Yes | Yes |
| Tōjin Makyō Den: Hercules no Eikō | Data East | 1987 | NES | May 21, 2026 | May 21, 2026 | May 21, 2026 | May 21, 2026 | Yes | Yes |
| Tōkidenshō Angel Eyes | Tecmo | 1997 | PlayStation | Aug 13, 2026 | Aug 13, 2026 | Aug 13, 2026 | Aug 13, 2026 | Yes | Yes |
| UFO: A Day in the Life | ASCII Corporation | 1999 | PlayStation | Aug 6, 2026 | Aug 6, 2026 | Aug 6, 2026 | Aug 6, 2026 | Yes | Yes |

== Embedded compilations ==
These are the arcade game compilations that use the core emulators used on the Arcade Archives series, generally going under the "Powered by Arcade Archives" remark.

| Title | Publisher | Games included | Release date | Platforms |
|---|---|---|---|---|
| Arcade Classics Anniversary Collection | Konami | A-Jax; Gradius; Gradius II; Haunted Castle; Salamander; Scramble; Thunder Cross; TwinBee | April 18, 2019 ^{WW} | Nintendo Switch; PlayStation 4 Xbox One; Microsoft Windows |
| Taito Milestones | Taito (Note: Published by ININ Games outside Japan) | Alpine Ski; Chack'n Pop; Elevator Action; The Fairyland Story; Front Line; Halley's Comet; The Ninja Warriors; Qix; Space Seeker; Wild Western | February 24, 2022 ^{JP} April 15, 2022 ^{WW} | Nintendo Switch |
| Taito Milestones 2 | Taito | Ben Bero Beh; Darius II; Dino Rex; Gun Frontier; KiKi KaiKai; The Legend of Kage; Liquid Kids; Metal Black; The NewZealand Story; Solitary Fighter | August 31, 2023 ^{JP} September 1, 2023 ^{WW} | Nintendo Switch |
| Taito Milestones 3 | Taito | Bubble Bobble; Cadash; Champion Wrestler; Dead Connection; Growl; Rainbow Islands; Rastan Saga; Rastan Saga II; Thunder Fox; Warrior Blade | November 28, 2024 ^{JP} December 10, 2024 ^{WW} | Nintendo Switch |
| Taito Milestones 4 | Taito (Note: Published by Clear River Games outside Japan) | Arkanoid; Bonze Adventure; Cameltry; Don Doko Don; Field Day; Kurikinton; The Ninja Kids; Syvalion; Typhoon Gal; Water Ski | March 26, 2026 ^{WW} | Nintendo Switch |
| Taito Milestones 5 | Taito | Arkanoid: Revenge of Doh; Crime City; Extermination; Final Blow; Football Champ; Land Sea Air Squad; Marine Date; Plump Pop; Sagaia; Space Invaders | January 28, 2027 ^{JP} | Nintendo Switch |
| ACA Neo Geo Selection Vol. 1 | SNK | Alpha Mission II; Garou: Mark of the Wolves; The King of Fighters '94; Metal Slug X Riding Hero; Samurai Shodown V Savage Reign; Shock Troopers; Top Hunter: Roddy & Cathy; Top Player's Golf | December 12, 2024 ^{JP} | Nintendo Switch |
| ACA Neo Geo Selection Vol. 2 | SNK | Baseball Stars Professional; Big Tournament Golf; Fatal Fury 2 Ghost Pilots; The King of Fighters '95; Metal Slug 4 Mutation Nation; Samurai Shodown; Shock Troopers 2nd Squad; Stakes Winner 2 | December 12, 2024 ^{JP} | Nintendo Switch |
| ACA Neo Geo Selection Vol. 3 | SNK | 3 Count Bout; Baseball Stars 2 Blazing Star; Fatal Fury: King of Fighters; The King of Fighters '96; Last Resort; Ninja Combat; Samurai Shodown III; Sengoku; World Heroes Perfect | April 10, 2025 ^{JP} | Nintendo Switch |
| ACA Neo Geo Selection Vol. 4 | SNK | Art of Fighting 3 The King of Fighters 2000; The Last Blade; Metal Slug; Neo Geo Cup '98: The Road to the Victory; Ninja Commando; Pulstar; Puzzled; Ragnagard; The Super Spy | April 10, 2025 ^{JP} | Nintendo Switch |
| ACA Neo Geo Selection Vol. 5 | SNK | Aero Fighters 2 Aggressors of Dark Kombat; Art of Fighting 2 Burning Fight; Cyber-Lip; The King of Fighters 2002: Challenge to Ultimate Battle; Real Bout Fatal Fury; Super Sidekicks; Thrash Rally; Twinkle Star Sprites | August 7, 2025 ^{JP} | Nintendo Switch |
| ACA Neo Geo Selection Vol. 6 | SNK | Aero Fighters 3 Football Frenzy; The King of Fighters '98: The Slugfest; The Last Blade 2 Over Top; Real Bout Fatal Fury Special; Samurai Shodown IV: Amakusa's Revenge; Sengoku 3 The Ultimate 11: SNK Football Championship; Zed Blade | August 7, 2025 ^{JP} | Nintendo Switch |
| ACA Neo Geo Selection Vol. 7 | SNK | Fatal Fury Special; The King of Fighters 2003; King of the Monsters 2: The Next Thing; Metal Slug 5 Pleasure Goal: 5 on 5 Mini Soccer; Power Spikes II; Prehistoric Isle 2 Puzzle Bobble; World Heroes 2 ZuPaPa! | November 6, 2025 ^{JP} | Nintendo Switch |
| ACA Neo Geo Selection Vol. 8 | SNK | Art of Fighting; Blue's Journey; Crossed Swords; The King of Fighters '99: Millennium Battle; Kizuna Encounter: Super Tag Battle; Metal Slug 2 NAM-1975; Puzzle Bobble 2 Super Sidekicks 2: The World Championship; World Heroes 2 Jet | November 6, 2025 ^{JP} | Nintendo Switch |
| ACA Neo Geo Selection Vol. 9 | SNK | Fatal Fury 3: Road to the Final Victory; Karnov's Revenge; The King of Fighters 2001; King of the Monsters; Magical Drop II; Magician Lord; Samurai Shodown II; Street Hoop; Super Sidekicks 3: The Next Glory; World Heroes | December 18, 2025 ^{JP} | Nintendo Switch |
| ACA Neo Geo Selection Vol. 10 | SNK | The King of Fighters '97; Magical Drop III; Metal Slug 3 Ninja Master's: Haō Ninpō Chō; Pop 'n Bounce; Real Bout Fatal Fury 2: The Newcomers; Samurai Shodown V Special; Sengoku 2 Stakes Winner; Super Baseball 2020 | December 18, 2025 ^{JP} | Nintendo Switch |
| Route-16 Collection | Sunsoft | Route-16; Route-16 Turbo (Note: Currently unavailable as part of Console Archives); Route-16 R (Note: Original game that runs on native hardware) | August 6, 2026 ^{WW} | Nintendo Switch |

== See also ==
- Nintendo Classics
- Oretachi Gēsen Zoku
- Arcade Game Series
- Sega Ages
- EGG Console
- Virtual Console
