= Pop'n Pop =

1998 video game

- Japanese arcade flyer
- Developers: Taito; Dreams Co., Ltd. (Windows); Nekogumi (Game Boy Color)
- Publishers: Taito; JVC Music Europe (Europe); Virgin Interactive (White Label); Bay Area Multimedia (Yogi Bear)
- Platforms: Arcade, PlayStation, Microsoft Windows, Game Boy Color
- Release: February 1998: Arcade; WW: February 1998 PlayStation; JP: October 22, 1998; EU: 1998; JP: March 9, 2000 (reprint); EU: December 2000 (Virgin Interactive White Label) Windows; JP: July 28, 2000; EU: July 2000; JP: March 5, 2004 (reprint) Game Boy Color; NA: December 17, 2000; JP: February 16, 2001; EU: 2001 PlayStation Network; JP: January 14, 2009
- Genre: Puzzle
- Modes: Single-player, multiplayer
- Arcade system: Taito F3 System

Pop'n Pop (ぽっぷんぽっぷ, Poppunpoppu) is a puzzle video game released in arcades by Taito in February 1998. It features characters from Taito games Rainbow Islands, Kiki Kaikai, Don Doko Don, and The NewZealand Story.

The game was ported to the PlayStation and Game Boy Color. The Game Boy Color version was also released in North America with Yogi Bear characters, under the title Yogi Bear: Great Balloon Blast.

== Gameplay ==
Gameplay is a hybrid of Puzzle Bobble, Arkanoid, and Space Invaders. Rows of coloured balloons advance down the screen, and the player must shoot their own balloons at them. When three balloons of the same colour match up, they disappear.

== Ports ==
The game was released in Japan and Europe for the PlayStation and Game Boy Color. Both the PlayStation and Game Boy Color versions added additional characters from other Taito games, such as Bubblun from Bubble Symphony, Ptolemy from The Fairyland Story, Chack'n from Chack'n Pop, Hipopo from Liquid Kids, and Drunk from Bubble Bobble. Chack'n, Hipopo and Drunk are hidden in the PlayStation version, but initially playable in the Game Boy Color version.

A Microsoft Windows version was developed by Dreams and was released in the UK by Vektorlogic Ltd., and in Japan by CyberFront around. It does not include the secret characters of the PlayStation version.

=== Yogi Bear: Great Balloon Blast ===
Yogi Bear: Great Balloon Blast, a port of Pop'n Pop, was released for the Game Boy Color in North America on December 17, 2000. It features playable characters Yogi Bear, Boo-Boo Bear, and Cindy Bear, characters from Hanna-Barbera's animated television series The Yogi Bear Show. Gameplay is similar to Pop'n Pop, but the setting has been changed to the fictional location of the series, Jellystone Park. This version includes link cable support for multiplayer interaction.

== Legacy ==
A version was also announced for the Wii console for release in Europe in 2007, according to the Q2 Update posted by Nintendo of Europe. However, in common with other planned updates of Taito franchises such as KiKi KaiKai 2, Taito appear to have withdrawn their license for unknown reasons, and the game was reworked and released under the name Balloon Pop in North America and Pop! in Europe.

The original arcade version also appeared in the Xbox and Microsoft Windows versions of Taito Legends 2, though missing the arcade and PlayStation's 15 kHz scan-lined video output (they feature upscaled graphics instead), and to date has not been collected in any of the Japanese Taito Memories compilations. The PlayStation version was re-released on the PlayStation Network on January 13, 2009, in Japan.
