= The Fairyland Story =

1985 video game

- Arcade instruction card
- Developer: Taito
- Publisher: Taito
- Directors: Masaki Ogata; Mikio Hatano
- Designer: Hiroshi Tsujino
- Artists: Toshiyuki Nishimura; Tetsuro Kitagawa
- Composer: Y. Tsuchida
- Platforms: Arcade, Mobile phone, MSX, X68000, PlayStation 4, Nintendo Switch
- Release: JP: July 1985
- Genre: Platform
- Modes: Single-player, multiplayer

The Fairyland Story (Note: Japanese: フェアリーランドストーリー, Hepburn: Fearīrando Sutōrī) is a 1985 platform video game developed and published by Taito for arcades. It was released only in Japan in July 1985. It serves as a spiritual predecessor to later Taito platform games, such as Bubble Bobble and The NewZealand Story. It has been ported to various home systems, and has seen releases in various Taito compilations.

== Gameplay ==
Arcade version screenshot

The Fairyland Story is a platform arcade game in which the player takes control the witch Ptolemy through a series of single-screen stages, and the objective is to defeat all of the enemies on each screen. Ptolemy's main weapon is her projectile magic, which will temporarily transform the enemies into large cakes. While in a "caked" form, the enemies can be destroyed either by further magic attacks or by being dropped off a platform, possibly squashing other enemies below. Squashing more than one enemy results in an award of more points and, sometimes, in extra bonuses. 2000 points are awarded for squashing an enemy below a cake, with each additional enemy doubling the number of points awarded. If two or more enemies are killed at once in one spot, a coin will appear in that spot, which may be collected for additional points, and if more are collected, will multiply in points, so as long the player doesn't lose a life.

Ptolemy's enemies are based upon typical fantasy beings - these include Orcs, pig-like soldiers, Salamanders, dragon-like creatures that can breathe fire, Wizards, mages that can make Ptolemy shrink and disappear, Clerics, bishops who can multiply themselves, Golems, and Wraiths, hooded creatures can phase through Ptolemy's magic. If Ptolemy takes too long to clear a level of a last remaining enemy, eventually that enemy will disappear without an award of points. If, however, Ptolemy takes too long to clear more than one enemy from the level, a flying devil, named Horned, appears to kill Ptolemy. The devil is invulnerable to Ptolemy's magic, and the only way to survive is for Ptolemy to kill all remaining enemies.

Ptolemy's deaths are animated in different ways, depending on the enemy who kills her. She can sometimes collect some utility bonuses which increase her power and range of her magic for a short while or offensive bonuses that, most usually, result in the cake-ification and destruction of all on-screen enemies. At various intervals between levels, an intermission screen appears during the game showing Ptolemy riding on the back of a large, wingless blue dragon named Rodemy.

== Development and release ==
The Fairyland Story was released by Taito only in Japan in July 1985. It was designed by Hiroshi "ONIJUST" Tsujino, best known for designing The Ninja Warriors, with music composed by Y. Tsuchida, and sound effects done by Tadashi Kimijima. While working at Taito's Yokohama Institute, Tsujino drafted an idea for a game where the player had to defeat enemies by crushing them under large cakes, which he claims to be partly inspired by his addiction to Namco's Dig Dug. Early versions of the game were said to have been "monotonous" and left Tsujino largely unhappy with the outcome — being inspired by Broderbund's Lode Runner for the Apple II, he gave the game a larger emphasis on strategy and memorization, featuring reworked stage designs. The game's final boss took a week to complete. Executives at Taito were against the idea of the game having an ending and demanded that the team remove it, but Tsujino ignored their request.

=== Conversions ===
An MSX port, developed and published by Hot-B, was released around 1987. This port featured new stages not found in the arcade version. The port also featured two new enemies, the Iron Golem, which is the same as the Golem enemy but immune to Ptolemy's magic, and Fleck, an enemy that can use the same magic as Ptolemy. Later, a X68000 port was developed and published by SPS, and was released around 1991. Unlike the MSX port, however, this was a more straightforward port of the arcade version. It added several features not found in the original arcade version, like level progress and high score saving, and the choice between two soundtracks, the choices being an emulation of the original soundtrack, or a remixed soundtrack. In 2003, a port was made available for Japanese mobile phones via the I-mode and EZweb network services. Some of the music from this port appears in a soundtrack album for mobile games made by Taito. Emulated versions of the original arcade version would later be included on the arcade collections Taito Legends 2, Taito Memories Jokan, Taito Memories Pocket, Taito Legends Power-Up. A port of the game was released worldwide in December 2020 for Nintendo Switch and PlayStation 4 as part of the Arcade Archives initiative by Hamster Corporation. This port features online leaderboards and new gameplay modes. The Arcade Archives port was later featured on Taito Milestones. The game is featured on the Taito Egret II Mini as part of the system's default 40-game lineup.

A Famicom version of the game developed by Tose was set to be released in Japan sometime in 1986, but was cancelled.

== Reception and legacy ==
In Japan, the game was positively received, mostly due to its intricate level designs and its puzzle-platformer elements. The MSX and Sharp X68000 ports similarly received a warm reception.

Overseas views on The Fairyland Story however have been mixed to positive. A mini review of the game in a The NewZealand Story retrospective in an issue of Retro Gamer claimed the game as "nothing special" due to its level designs and simplistic gameplay mechanics. PlayStation Official Magazine - UK, while reviewing Taito Legends Power Up, unfavorably compared it to Parasol Stars, referring to it as a "dress rehearsal" for Parasol Stars. When criticizing the fact that Bubble Bobble was a locked game in Taito Memories Jokan, Hardcore Gamer said that while one could "make do" with it and Don Doko Don, ultimately stated that it was "decaf when you want espresso". When reviewing Taito Legends 2, Eurogamer wrote that the game was "hugely additive", although criticized it for the lack of co-op play. A more in-depth retrospective review on the game by Hardcore Gaming 101 was more positive, praising the game for its detailed graphics (for the time) and its risk-versus-reward gameplay elements. While criticizing the game for being too punishing for beginner players, and for denying players the right to continue on rounds 99 through 101, they said that the game was "highly recommended" for people that are "into cute platformer games and/or Bubble Bobble-like games". However, it was noted that the Sharp X68000 version was the best way to play the game, due to the addition of the save system, as well as the fact that it lets players continue anytime they liked.

The game's inclusion in Taito Milestones has similarly led to a mixed to positive response overseas. Some review sites, like multiplayer.it, Gaming Age, and TouchArcade, praised it for its mechanics, with some minor criticisms from the latter two. Others like Hardcore Gamer and Nintendo World Report unfavorably compared it to Bubble Bobble.

The Fairyland Story is often considered to be one of the spiritual predecessors to Bubble Bobble, mostly due to the similar gameplay mechanics. Gameplay elements and power-ups from The Fairyland Story would later be used in The NewZealand Story. A block formation that resembles Ptolemy appears as a hidden level in The NewZealand Story. A hidden world in Rainbow Islands, called Magical Island, is based on The Fairyland Story. The Worm enemy would later appear in both Don Doko Don and Don Doko Don 2.
