= Bubble Bobble 2 =

Bubble Bobble 2 may refer to:

- Rainbow Islands: The Story of Bubble Bobble 2, the first "sequel" to Bubble Bobble
- Bubble Bobble Part 2, released on the Nintendo Entertainment System and Game Boy
- Bubble Symphony, also known as Bubble Bobble II in some countries
