= Bubble Bobble 4 Friends =

2019 video game

- Developer: Taito
- Publishers: JP: Taito; AS: Arc System Works; NA/PAL: ININ Games; NA/PAL: Clear River Games (Switch 2)
- Director: Tsuyoshi Tozaki
- Producer: Nikkou Yamashita
- Designers: Tsuyoshi Tozaki; Hidetake Iyomasa
- Programmers: Yuta Sakamoto; Teppei Moriwaki
- Artists: Kazuhiro Ninomiya; Yukina Izu
- Composers: Yukiharu Urita; Yu Shimoda
- Series: Bubble Bobble
- Platforms: Nintendo Switch; PlayStation 4 Windows; Nintendo Switch 2
- Release: Switch; November 19, 2019; PlayStation 4; November 17, 2020; Windows; September 30, 2021; Switch 2; February 25, 2027
- Genre: Platform
- Modes: Single-player, multiplayer

Bubble Bobble 4 Friends is a 2019 platform game developed and published by Taito. It is the first entry in the Bubble Bobble series since 2009's Bubble Bobble Plus! The game's reception had been mixed when it was first released on the Nintendo Switch, but the PlayStation 4 version was better received a year later.

== Gameplay ==
The game has a gameplay similar to other titles in the franchise. The game characters are 3D models, with only the background in 2D. Players control two dragons, Bub or Bob, that can trap enemies in bubbles and pop them in order to eliminate them from the screen. When eliminating an enemy, a fruit is generated that can be collected as a reward to increase the player's score.

The game contains 50 different stages that can be played in two difficulty levels. To unlock the most difficult level, the player must first complete the 50 stages in the normal level. Also included is the original Bubble Bobble arcade game released in 1986. In addition, there is an "Arcade of the Future" feature that can only be completed with ten lives and no continues, consisting of 100 levels (one on each floor in a tower) where players can complete it by getting past the 100th floor.

== Release ==
The game was released for the Nintendo Switch, initially in Europe and Australia. In February and March 2020, it was released, respectively, in Japan and American continents. Later, a free update known as Bubble Bobble 4 Friends - The Baron is Back was released on November 17, 2020, with a PlayStation 4 version releasing the same day. A Steam version, under the name Bubble Bobble 4 Friends: The Baron's Workshop, was released on September 30, 2021. A Nintendo Switch 2 Edition, including an exclusive expansion called Stardrop Mountain, is set to release on February 25, 2027.

== Reception ==
The Switch version of the game received mixed reviews. On Metacritic, the game has a weighted average score of 68 out of 100, based on 38 critics, indicating "mixed or average reviews". Regarding the version released later for the PlayStation 4, called Bubble Bobble 4 Friends: The Baron is Back, it received 75 out of 100 points on Metacritic, based on 5 reviews. Although the environment and gameplay were highly praised, the small number of stages was pointed out as negative points.

Britt Roberts of Nintendo Life praised the gameplay, describing it as fluid and fun, and highlighted the timelessness of the formula adopted by the game since the first version.
