= Parasol Stars =

1991 video game

Parasol Stars: The Story of Bubble Bobble III
- Japanese PC Engine box art
- Developer: Taito (Note: Ports developed by Ocean Software)
- Publishers: Taito: TurboGrafx-16; JP: Taito; NA: Working Designs Amiga, Atari ST, Game Boy, NES Ocean Software
- Composers: Noriyuki Iwadare: Game Boy; Jonathan Dunn; NES; Matthew Cannon; Jonathan Dunn
- Series: Rainbow Islands
- Platforms: TurboGrafx-16, Game Boy, Amiga, Atari ST, Nintendo Entertainment System
- Release: February 15, 1991: TurboGrafx-16; JP: February 15, 1991; NA: October 1991 Game Boy; EU: 1991 Amiga, Atari ST; EU: March 23, 1992 NES; PAL: 1992
- Genre: Platform
- Modes: Single-player, multiplayer

Parasol Stars: The Story of Bubble Bobble III (Note: Japanese: パラソルスター, Hepburn: Parasoru Sutā) is a 1991 platform video game developed and published by Taito for the TurboGrafx-16. It is a sequel to 1987's Rainbow Islands, and the third game in the Bubble Bobble series. The game was ported by Ocean Software to the Amiga, Atari ST, Game Boy and Nintendo Entertainment System (with the NES port released under the title Parasol Stars: Rainbow Islands II). On July 11, 2024, the game was digitally re-released for the PlayStation 4, PlayStation 5, Xbox One, Xbox Series X/S, Nintendo Switch, and Windows.

== Gameplay ==
PC Engine version screenshot

Bubby and Bobby (the characters' human names) star once again as the main characters, retaining their human forms from Rainbow Islands. However, this game is more of a take on Bubble Bobble than it is on Rainbow Islands.

The game takes place on a number of different worlds, each with a distinct theme. Each world features seven rounds, the last one always hosting a boss that must be defeated to progress to the next world. There are eight main worlds, but in order to complete the game properly, the player must open a secret door on the final world by collecting three of the Star items - allowing access to two secret worlds themed around Bubble Bobble and Chack'n Pop that are not initially visible on the main screen. Completing these two lead to the final boss, Chaostikhan (the one responsible for stealing color from the worlds, and supposedly the mastermind behind the previous game's villains) and the true ending. According to an ACE magazine in-depth preview, the Amiga and Atari ST versions also contain a secret "Nightmare" world.

The player is armed with a parasol. While it is normally closed, the player can deploy it in two ways; either open in front of them, or open above the head. The parasol is a multipurpose device, it can block as a shield, stun enemies, capture droplets or hurl enemies. At many points it can be used as a parachute.

The rounds are simple arrangements of platforms. Almost every level has droplets which drip from points in the level. They fall under the influence of gravity and roll along the platforms within the screen. The player can capture these on their parasol and throw them at enemies.

The parasol can hold more than one droplet at once; if five are held, they merge into a large droplet with a special power. There are four different kinds of droplets, with a mostly elemental theme, some of which are carried over from Bubble Bobble.

== Release ==
Unlike many other games in the series, Parasol Stars was never released to arcades - it was originally developed for the PC Engine, and later converted to a number of other home systems. Parasol Stars was misreported as being the third coin-op in the Bubble Bobble series by many magazines at the time, and there are rumors about prototypes for an arcade version. Taito has officially stated that an arcade game was never produced. Mick West (the programmer for the Amiga and Atari ST versions) said that they ported the game directly from the PC Engine by playing it and that he did not know anything about an arcade version.

The game was released in limited quantities in North America for the TurboGrafx-16 by Working Designs. The Amiga, Atari ST, NES, and Game Boy versions were produced by Ocean Software and published exclusively in Europe in 1992. A ZX Spectrum port was planned, but later cancelled. The game was also planned for the Commodore 64, but was cancelled as well. Ocean initially explained that the developer's computer was stolen in a burglary, but it was later revealed that the game was scrapped after the freelance developer's wife destroyed said computer in a drunken rage, along with the backups of the work. The 1996 compilation Bubble Bobble featuring Rainbow Islands for the Sega Saturn, PlayStation, and PC was originally going to include Parasol Stars as well, but was dropped from the lineup mid-development.

== Relation to other games ==
The game's subtitle is The Story of Bubble Bobble III, which was also used as the subtitle for Bubble Memories, released in arcades in 1995. Bubble Memories is a prequel (given the "Memories" part of the name) to the 1994 game Bubble Symphony, which was released as Bubble Bobble 2 in some countries. Nonetheless, Rainbow Islands is indeed the sequel to the original Bubble Bobble, even though said sequel doesn't retain the gameplay from the first. Since Bubble Memories was released years after Parasol Stars, it may be a retcon in which Parasol Stars never happened, whereby after the events of Rainbow Islands, the humans Bubby and Bobby are once again transformed into the bubble dragons Bubblun and Bobblun. However, it's also possible that Parasol Stars could be a side story, or "gaiden" to the series occurring after Rainbow Islands, but before Bubble Memories. The game has also been released as Parasol Stars: Rainbow Islands II, such as on the NES.

== Musical reference ==
Much like Rainbow Islands used The Wizard of Oz's song "Somewhere Over the Rainbow", Parasol Stars also made a reference to a well known song in its soundtrack. The game's boss fight music is a variation of the 1989 hit "Lambada" by the French-Brazilian pop group Kaoma.

== Reception ==
CU Amiga praised the game, giving it 95% and a "Super Star". Amiga Power was a little less enthusiastic, giving it 88%.

Entertainment Weekly named Parasol Stars the 15th greatest game available in 1991, saying: "This one's even more fun to play than it is to describe: Bubby (or Bobby when two play simultaneously) uses his umbrella to flick bizarre meanies across the screen and turn them into pieces of cake, apples, mushrooms, etc., which he then gobbles up in order to earn points".
