= Puzzle Bobble 2 =

1995 video game

- Japanese arcade flyer
- Developer: Taito (Note: Game Boy and Nintendo 64 versions developed by Probe Entertainment; Mac OS version developed by ISCO; Neo Geo MVS version developed by Ukiyotei.)
- Publishers: Taito: Arcade Taito EX SNK PlayStation, Saturn, Game Boy; JP: Taito; NA/PAL: Acclaim Entertainment MS-DOS, Nintendo 64 Acclaim Entertainment Windows; JP: CyberFront; NA: Interplay Productions; EU: Agetec Mac OS CyberFront
- Designer: Seiichi Nakakuki
- Programmers: Hiroshi Maruyama; Junichiro Noguchi
- Artist: Kazuhiro Kinoshita
- Composers: Kazuko Umino; Norihiro Furukawa; Shuichiro Nakazawa
- Series: Puzzle Bobble
- Platforms: Arcade, PlayStation, Sega Saturn, MS-DOS, Windows, Game Boy, Nintendo 64, Mac OS
- Release: September 1995: Arcade; JP: September 1995; NA: November 1995 EX; NA: September 1999 PlayStation; JP: March 29, 1996; NA: June 4, 1996; PAL: August 28, 1996 Saturn; JP: July 26, 1996; PAL: August 28, 1996; NA: September 24, 1996 MS-DOS; NA: 1996; EU: 1997 Windows; JP: 1996; EU: 1997; NA: 1998 Game Boy; NA: February 1998; JP: April 10, 1998; EU: 1998 Nintendo 64; NA: May 20, 1998; EU: 1998 Mac OS; JP: January 28, 2000
- Genre: Puzzle
- Modes: Single-player, multiplayer
- Arcade system: Taito F3 System, Neo Geo MVS

Puzzle Bobble 2 is a 1995 tile-matching puzzle video game developed and published by Taito for arcades. The first sequel to Puzzle Bobble, it is also known in Europe and North America as Bust-A-Move Again for arcades and Bust-A-Move 2: Arcade Edition for home consoles. Released into the arcades in 1995, home conversions followed for the PlayStation, Sega Saturn, Nintendo 64, and Windows platforms.

The game builds on the original by adding a tournament-style variation on the two-player game for play against the computer and by adding a branching map to the one-player game, allowing the player to periodically select one of two groups of five levels to play next, leading to different game endings. Some of the contestants in the new tournament mode are based on characters from Bubble Bobble, including variations on a Monsta and a Mighta. Some versions of the game, including the PlayStation, feature time trial competitions in which a single player attempts to finish simple rounds quickly enough to beat previous time records or two players simultaneously attempt to beat the records and each other.

Completion of the single-player game gives the player a code that can be entered to unlock "Another World" for the single-player game, which features subtle changes to the existing levels to increase their difficulty and changes to all backdrops to resemble levels from Bubble Bobble. The various enemies from Bubble Bobble also make an appearance in the background of the credits sequence.

The game was included in Taito Legends 2, but the US arcade version was included in the US PS2 version instead. Hamster Corporation re-released the game as part of their ACA Neo Geo series for the PlayStation 4, Xbox One, Nintendo Switch and Windows. The ports were released by City Connection alongside Puzzle Bobble 3 in February 2023.

== North American version ==
Arcade version screenshot

The North American version of the original arcade release is much different than the other versions. Bub and Bob were removed from the game and replaced with a pair of disembodied hands. Also, the characters that were in the Vs. CPU mode were replaced with a generic computer. The backgrounds are different. The audio was also changed, and the voices in the game were removed. These changes were only made for the Taito F3 System version, since the Neo Geo and console releases are based on the original Japanese version. If this version was played in an emulator, it would have the Japanese audio, although the music would cut out on some levels. This emulation error was fixed in 2006, after it appeared in Taito Legends 2.

== Puzzle Bobble 2X ==
Taito later repacked the game with an optional alternative set of levels and some new attract mode animations (including holiday-themed ones), under the titles Puzzle Bobble 2X and Bust-A-Move Again EX.

Ports of Bust-A-Move 2 to MS-DOS and Sega Saturn are of Bust-A-Move 2X and additionally include a level editor/designer.

== Release ==
=== Promotion ===
The game was showcased at JAMMA 95 along with Dangerous Curves and Gekirindan.

=== North American cover art ===
The North American cover art of the PlayStation and Saturn editions was considered wildly inappropriate for a cheerful game that could be played by young children.

In North America, print advertisements for the Saturn and PlayStation editions featured a picture of several large blue balls with human faces trapped inside, moaning in apparent agony, with white sticks forcing their eyes open. The shots of the game packaging in the lower right corner of the ad show that the North American release of the game was to use the same cover art as the PAL release. Instead, the North American release of both Saturn and PlayStation editions uses the main art from the advertisement as their cover art. This cover (jointly with the cover art to Super Bust-A-Move) was included on GameSpy's "Top Ten Worst Covers" list, with journalist Kevin Bowen writing that the disturbing imagery was likely to frighten away the game's young target audience. The later MS-DOS and Nintendo 64 releases from Acclaim use the cover art used on the PAL releases.

=== Nintendo 64 version ===
By the time Puzzle Bobble 2 was released for the Nintendo 64, the PlayStation and Saturn versions of the game had been out for nearly two years, and even Puzzle Bobble 3 had already been released for those systems. Because of this, Acclaim sold the Nintendo 64 version at a budget price of $50.

== Reception ==
=== Commercial ===
In Japan, Game Machine listed Puzzle Bobble 2 as the fourth most successful arcade game of October 1995. The magazine later listed Puzzle Bobble 2X as the ninth most successful arcade game of January 1996.

In the United Kingdom, it was among the nineteen best-selling PlayStation games of 1996, according to HMV.

=== Critical ===
Reception

Aggregate score
Aggregator	Score				
Aggregator	Arcade	N64	PC	PS	Saturn
GameRankings		81%		71%	

Review scores
Publication	Score				
Publication	Arcade	N64	PC	PS	Saturn
Computer and Video Games				4/5	4/5
Edge				8/10	
Electronic Gaming Monthly				8/10	
Famitsu				7/10, 5/10, 8/10, 5/10	
GameSpot		7.1/10		5.7/10	
IGN		8/10			
N64 Magazine		80%			
Next Generation	3/5			4/5	3/5
PlayStation Official Magazine – UK				9/10	
PC Zone			30%		
Sega Saturn Magazine					93%

A Next Generation critic gave the game a rave review, calling it "One of the most addictive puzzle games in the arcades right now". He praised the challenging gameplay and the "fascinating" trick of bouncing bubbles off the walls to ricochet into the right spot, and concluded, "It's fast, fun, and because of the title's bright, innocent looks and unpretentious simplicity, it's almost unfair."

A brief review of the PlayStation version in Next Generation said it was "sure to please, especially in two-player mode." The four reviewers of Electronic Gaming Monthly applauded the game for its engaging gameplay, its large amount of content, the usage of tricky bank shots in addition to the color-matching traditional to action puzzlers, and the fierce competitiveness of the two-player mode. Rad Automatic also commented positively on these aspects in Sega Saturn Magazine, and said that though the game is best with two players, the single-player Puzzle Mode makes the game worth buying even for those who have no one to play with. Echoing Next Generation, he remarked that "whilst Bust-a-Move 2 maintains the sweet harmless exterior of a sherbert bonbon, inside beats the addictive heart of a malteser."

Electronic Gaming Monthly named the Saturn and PlayStation versions a runner-up for Puzzle Game of the Year (behind Tetris Attack). It was also a finalist for the Computer Game Developers Conference's 1996 "Best Trivia or Puzzle Game" Spotlight Award, but lost the prize to You Don't Know Jack XL. In 1996, GamesMaster ranked the game 20th on their list of the "Top 100 Games of All Time".

In PC Zone, Charlie Brooker called the Windows version a bad conversion with slowdowns, clunky animation, jerky aiming and blurry high resolution. He recommended buying the Game Boy version instead.
