= Bust-A-Move Bash! =

2007 video game

- North American box art
- Developer: Happy Happening
- Publishers: NA: Majesco; EU: 505 Games
- Series: Puzzle Bobble
- Platform: Wii
- Release: NA: April 17, 2007; EU: May 11, 2007
- Genre: Puzzle
- Modes: Single-player, multiplayer

Bust-A-Move Bash! (Note: Formerly known as Bust-A-Move Revolution) (known in Europe as Bust-A-Move) is a bubble shooter tile-matching video game released exclusively for the Wii, as part of the Bust-A-Move series. It is the second Bust-A-Move game released on a Nintendo console after Bust-A-Move 3000, released in 2003 on the GameCube.

== Gameplay ==
Bust-A-Move Bash! incorporates the same gameplay principles and premise of prior games in the Bust-A-Move series, as a colorful bubble shooter. Bash features several different modes: puzzle, shooting, endless and a multiplayer mode.

- In puzzle mode, the player completes levels by eliminating all on-screen bubbles, which is done by shooting a bubble at a cluster of bubbles of the same color. There are also special kinds of bubbles with different game-altering properties, such as star, flame and rainbow bubbles. There is also a bonus round after every 10 levels beaten, which will unlock one kind of the aforementioned special bubbles when completed successfully.
- In shooting mode, bubbles of four colors will fly in from all sides of the screen and the player must shoot down whichever bubbles match the color of the on-screen cursor, using Wii Remote pointer controls.
- Endless mode is a survival mode where the player is challenged to destroy as many bubbles and collect as many jewels as possible before an encroaching mass of bubbles crosses a foul line.
- Versus mode is the game's couch multiplayer mode, where up to eight players can compete to test their bubble-shooting skills on a single screen, scoring as many jewels as possible until time expires. For games involving five to eight players, the first four designated players will use Wii Remotes, while the remaining players use external controllers connected to them (the Nunchuk or the Classic Controller), which cannot be used in single-player modes.

=== Controls ===
For all modes except shooting mode, there are three control schemes involving the Wii Remote that are used to control the bubble shooter: baton, gun and easy-gun. Gun and easy gun utilize the pointer to determine the angle of the next shot, with easy gun displaying the pointer's cursor. Baton involves holding the Wii Remote upright and tilting it left or right to determine the shooting angle. The baton control scheme is the only control scheme available for multiplayer contestants using a Nunchuk, and the Classic Controller uses both analog sticks to aim the shooter. Bubble-swapping is mapped to the down button on the d-pad for the Wii Remote and Classic Controller, or a downward flick of the Nunchuk's analog stick.

== Development ==
Ken Gold, the vice president of Majesco marketing, stated that Majesco wanted Bash! to "maximize the intuitive nature of the Wii controller to create a revolutionary offering of the highly popular Bust-A-Move franchise", eventually leading to the idea of leveraging the Wii Remote's expansion capabilities to allow up to eight players to compete on a single screen by having two players share one Wii controller by each holding one of its two individual parts - the remote itself or its external controller.

== Reception ==
Reception

Aggregate score
Aggregator	Score
Metacritic	53/100

Review scores
Publication	Score
1Up.com	C+
Eurogamer	4/10
GameSpot	4.7/10
GameSpy	2.5/5
IGN	5.3/10
NGamer	50%
Nintendo Power	6.5/10
Nintendo World Report	3.5/10
Official Nintendo Magazine	59%
VideoGamer.com	5/10
411Mania	7/10

Bust-A-Move Bash! received "mixed" reviews according to the review aggregation website Metacritic. IGN's Mark Birnbaum described it as "a step backwards for the series." Birnbaum criticized the game's control scheme as "lack[ing] ergonomic foresight" when playing with the Wii Remote and Nunchuk, its graphics as "lackluster" and too similar to the Dreamcast version, its multiplayer as "devoid of fun due to its emphasis on chaos rather than skill", and shooting mode, which criticisms he directed at the entire game, as "poorly implemented, tacked-on, and lacking inspiration." Despite this, Birnbaum praised its number of puzzles and its faithfulness to the original game.

== See also ==
- SpeedZone, another Wii game that supports 8-player multiplayer with other controllers
