= Bust-a-Move Millennium =

2000 video game

Bust-A-Move Millennium
- North American box art
- Developer: Altron
- Publishers: JP: Altron; NA/EU: Acclaim Entertainment (Note: Released under the Club Acclaim label)
- Series: Puzzle Bobble
- Platform: Game Boy Color
- Release: NA: October 24, 2000; EU: November 17, 2000; JP: December 22, 2000
- Genre: Puzzle
- Modes: Single-player, multiplayer

Bust-A-Move Millennium, also known as Puzzle Bobble Millennium (パズルボブル ミレニアム, Pazuru Boburu Mireniamu) in Japan, is a 2000 puzzle video game developed and published by Altron for the Game Boy Color.

== Gameplay ==
This game continues using the same mechanics as Puzzle Bobble 4. The game contains a new story mode and two-player-link mode, along with a "Challenge" mode like in the Game Boy version of Puzzle Bobble 4. The controls/pointer can be inconsistent, so the player often has to 'jiggle' the cursor in order to pinpoint where they want to shoot their bubble.

== Reception ==
Reception

Aggregate score
Aggregator	Score
GameRankings	84%

Review scores
Publication	Score
AllGame	3/5
Computer and Video Games	4/5
IGN	8/10
Nintendo Power	4.5/5

The game received favorable reviews according to the review aggregation website GameRankings.
