= Bubble Bobble Revolution =

2005 video game

- European cover art
- Developer: Dreams
- Publishers: JP: Taito; EU: Rising Star Games; NA: Codemasters
- Series: Bubble Bobble
- Platform: Nintendo DS
- Release: JP: 24 November 2005; EU: 2 December 2005; NA: 3 October 2006
- Genre: Platform
- Modes: Single-player, multiplayer

Bubble Bobble Revolution is a 2D platform game for the Nintendo DS. Developed by Dreams, it was released in Japan on 24 November 2005 by Taito as Bubble Bobble DS (バブルボブルDS, Baburu Boburu DS), in Europe on 2 December by Rising Star Games (distribution handled by (Atari Europe) and in North America on 3 October 2006 by Codemasters.

Bubble Bobble Revolution received a strongly negative reception after its release, because of poor graphics and level design, and the presence of a major software bug in the North American version that prevented the game from being completed.

== Gameplay ==
Screenshot from the "New-Age" version

There are two primary gameplay modes in Bubble Bobble Revolution: "Classic", and "New-Age".

"Classic" mode is a conversion of the original Bubble Bobble to the DS hardware. Gameplay is nearly identical to the original game: players must control either Bub or Bob through 100 single-screen levels, in which they must defeat a certain number of enemies in order to proceed; being hit by an enemy results in a loss of a life. Enemies are defeated by blowing bubbles to trap them and then colliding with them; each enemy produces a food item that can be collected for extra points. The original two player co-op multiplayer mode is also implemented; if each player owns a copy of the game, they can use the DS' Multi-Card Play feature to play together.

"New-Age" plays similarly to the original game, with several key differences. Characters and levels are larger (spanning the DS's dual screen), and enemies and projectiles are faster. There are additionally boss fights every tenth level, and Bub and Bob can now take three hits instead of one before dying and have several new types of bubbles. Fans are also scattered around levels, and can be spun by blowing into the DS's microphone. Rather than a co-op mode, "Revolution" includes a four-player competitive mode in which players compete for the most points in ten different levels.

=== Level 30 bug ===
All levels beyond #30 in both modes of the North American version are unplayable due to a programming error that causes the boss of that level not to spawn. This was an often criticized aspect of the game. Codemasters ultimately responded by releasing a fixed version of the game, which included a free copy of Rainbow Islands Revolution.

== Reception ==
Reception

Aggregate score
Aggregator	Score
Metacritic	38/100

Review scores
Publication	Score
4Players	65%
Edge	6/10
Eurogamer	2/10
Famitsu	25/40 (C+A) 23/40
GameSpot	3.6/10
GameZone	6/10
IGN	3.5/10
Jeuxvideo.com	12/20
Nintendo Power	6/10
411Mania	4/10

The game received "generally unfavorable" reviews according to the review aggregation website Metacritic. In Japan, Famitsu gave it a score of one seven and three sixes, while Famitsu Cube + Advance gave it a score of three sixes and one five. 411Mania gave it an unfavorable review, nearly two months before it was released Stateside.

Common criticism was directed at the game's dated visuals and level design. Reviewers also heavily criticized the game's number of odd glitches (such as enemies failing to spawn in levels, as well as levels being skipped entirely), which were described by Frank Provo of GameSpot as "strange" and "bizarre". Many critics also made note of the level 30 glitch, which Craig Harris of IGN claimed "makes a bad game worse". John Walker of Eurogamer began his review off by giving praise for the original game before harshly criticizing the "new-age" remake. Reviewers also made note of the drastic redesigns of the original characters, which were described as "stupendously ugly".

Despite the negative criticism, some did praise the game's inclusion of the original Bubble Bobble. Provo called the game "a genuine classic" and "enjoyable", and praised the multiplayer modes as well. However, Harris referred to them as "unacceptable" for requiring two copies of the game, a statement echoed by Walker.
