= Puzzle Bobble 3 =

1996 arcade game

- Arcade flyer
- Developer: Taito (Note: Ported to Nintendo 64 by Distinctive Developments. Game Boy version developed by Probe Entertainment.)
- Publishers: Taito: Sega Saturn; JP: Taito, Sega (SegaNet version); NA: Natsume Inc.; PAL: Acclaim Entertainment PlayStation/Nintendo 64; JP: Taito; NA/PAL: Acclaim Entertainment Game Boy; PAL: Acclaim Entertainment Windows; JP: CyberFront; PAL: Empire Interactive PS3 / PSP / PS Vita; WW: Square Enix
- Series: Puzzle Bobble
- Platforms: Arcade, Saturn, PlayStation, Game Boy, Nintendo 64, Windows, PlayStation Network
- Release: September 1996: Arcade; WW: September 1996 Saturn; JP: March 28, 1997; NA: December 9, 1997; EU: 1997 PlayStation; JP: November 6, 1997; NA: April 5, 1999; EU: February 27, 1998 Game Boy; EU: 1998 Nintendo 64; EU: November 1998; NA: April 5, 1999; JP: March 5, 1999 Windows; JP: 2001; EU: January 11, 2002 PlayStation Network; JP: December 10, 2008 PlayStation 3 / PSP; WW: December 10, 2008 PS Vita; WW: August 28, 2012
- Genre: Puzzle
- Mode: Up to two (four on the N64) players simultaneously
- Arcade system: Taito F3 System

Puzzle Bobble 3 (also known as Bust-A-Move 3) is an action puzzle video game developed by Taito. The second sequel to Puzzle Bobble, it was released for arcades in September 1996 and later ported to the Sega Saturn, PlayStation, Game Boy, Nintendo 64 and Microsoft Windows. Like its predecessors, the player is tasked with shooting balls at groups of balls, creating groups of three or more, which are then removed from play. Further ports for the Nintendo Switch, PlayStation 4 and Xbox One were released in February 2023 by City Connection alongside Puzzle Bobble 2.

The version of the game for the PlayStation and Nintendo 64 featured refreshed graphics and new features. It was released as Bust-A-Move 3 DX in Europe (versions for the Game Boy and Microsoft Windows were exclusively released there) and Bust-A-Move 99 in the United States. In Japan, the Nintendo 64 port was released as Puzzle Bobble 64, while the PlayStation version was released as Puzzle Bobble 3 DX.

== Gameplay ==
The game completely abandons the idea of previous titles that the playfield is being pushed down by some sort of mechanical device and instead attaches groups of bubbles to nodes that move downwards. When a node is no longer connected to any bubbles, it will disappear and when all nodes in a level have vanished the level is complete. As a result, shooting a bubble to the top of the visible playfield without striking any bubbles causes it to bounce and travel back downwards. The player is not penalised if such bubbles again leave the playing field without attaching to anything (except for adding to the number of moves until the field is pushed down by one empty line). Despite this, some versions include a reimplementation of the Puzzle Bobble 2 levels now built around nodes (entitled Version 2.5).

Gameplay is further varied by the implementation of new scrolling playfields that are several times as high as the screen and must be conquered as an endurance event. Each scrolling playfield occupies the same space on the world map as five previous levels.

This game also marks the introduction of rainbow bubbles into the series - bubbles that are initially transparent and filled with a rainbow. If an adjoining bubble is burst, the rainbow bubbles switch to the colour of the burst bubble, allowing the player to build up chain reactions.

The ability to choose a character was introduced, but only to the VS Computer mode. As in Bubble Bobble, the first player controls Bub, and the second player controls Bob. In the Nintendo 64 version, a four-player-simultaneous option is available.

== Release ==
Puzzle Bobble 3's developer, Taito, also published the game in Japan. The U.S. division of Acclaim Entertainment, which held the rights to publish Taito's games in the Western hemisphere, had dropped support for the Sega Saturn in mid-1997, so the Saturn version was published in North America by Natsume Inc. instead. However, Acclaim's European division published the Saturn version in PAL territories.

=== Promotion ===
The game was showcased at the JAMMA 96 along with Fighter's Impact and G-Darius.

== Reception ==
Reception

Aggregate score
Aggregator	Score		
Aggregator	N64	PS	Saturn
GameRankings	79%	71%	

Review scores
Publication	Score		
Publication	N64	PS	Saturn
Computer and Video Games			3/5
Electronic Gaming Monthly	8/10, 7/10, 6.5/10, 7/10		7.75/10
GameSpot	6.9/10		6.2/10
IGN	8.2/10	7/10	
N64 Magazine	82%		
Next Generation			4/5
N64 Gamer	8/10		
Sega Saturn Magazine			91%

In Japan, Game Machine listed Puzzle Bobble 3 on their January 1, 1997 issue as being the seventh most-successful arcade game of the month.

The Saturn port received moderately positive reviews, with critics voicing approval for the introduction of multiple playable characters with their own individual abilities, the vast number of levels included in the collection mode, and the intensity of the multiplayer gameplay. However, most questioned whether the game's improvements to the series formula were enough to warrant a purchase for gamers who already owned Bust-a-Move 2. GamePro found the reuse of the previous installment's soundtrack and the limited changes to the gameplay in particular doused much of the excitement for the game. Next Generation disagreed, asserting that "it's arguable that the formula Taito and Natsume hit on with the Bust-A-Move series needs no major improvements and is sure to please any puzzle fanatic. A must-have classic game."

Sega Saturn Magazine concluded that while the game's one-player modes lack sufficient longevity, they are highly enjoyable, and the two-player mode makes Bust-a-Move 3 a great purchase for puzzle fans. While Dan Hsu of Electronic Gaming Monthly argued that the Bust-a-Move games are mindless compared to other action puzzlers, his three co-reviewers all found the game to be great fun, and felt the enhancements were enough to make it worthwhile for veterans of the series. Kraig Kujawa summed up that "This game has about everything one could ask for from a sequel that keeps the original gameplay intact."

Electronic Gaming Monthly named Bust-a-Move 3 "Puzzle Game of the Year" at their 1997 Editors' Choice Awards, citing its accessibility and addictiveness. GamePro later named the PlayStation version of Bust-A-Move 99 a second runner-up for "9th Annual GamePro Readers' Choice Awards" for "Best Brain Game", which went to Mario Party.
