= Don Doko Don =

1989 video game

- Japanese arcade flyer
- Developer: Taito
- Publisher: Taito
- Producers: Seiji Kawakami; Toshiaki Matsumoto; Hiroyuki Sako
- Programmers: Kazutomo Ishida; Masaya Kinoshita
- Artists: Hiroyasu Nagai; V.A.P; Seiji Kawakami; Yukio Ishikawa; Yukio Abe
- Composer: Yasuko Yamada
- Platforms: Arcade, Family Computer, PC Engine
- Release: Arcade: JP: July 1989; Famicom: JP: March 9, 1990; PC Engine: JP: May 31, 1990
- Genre: Platform
- Modes: Single-player, multiplayer

Don Doko Don (Note: Japanese: ドンドコドン, Hepburn: Dondokodon) is a 1989 platform video game developed and published by Taito for arcades. In the game, the player(s) control two lumberjacks, Bob and Jim, with the objective being to clear the screen of all the enemies. Bob and Jim use their mallets to stun the enemies, pick up the enemies, then throw them at a wall, or other enemies to kill them off, resulting in bonus points. Bonus items also appear during stages that will have varying effects on the players.

Taito and ITL ported the game to both the Family Computer and PC Engine in 1990, both of which remained exclusive to Japan. A sequel game, aptly named Don Doko Don 2, was released in 1992 for the Family Computer in Japan, developed by Natsume Co., Ltd. The gameplay has been often compared to Taito's earlier platform games, specifically Bubble Bobble and The NewZealand Story.

== Gameplay ==
Arcade version screenshot

Don Doko Don is a platform arcade game. The player(s) control two lumberjacks, Bob and Jim, on their quest to save the princess and king of Marry Land. They go through a series of single-screen stages, with the objective of killing all the enemies on the stage. Bob and Jim defeat enemies by using a mallet to stun them. They can then pick stunned enemies up and throw them at other enemies to destroy them, which gives bonus points, depending on how many enemies are in the path of the thrown enemy. Destroyed enemies leave behind fruit which can be collected for points. Once all enemies are destroyed play proceeds to the next level which is generally more difficult. Throughout the game, various power-ups can be collected, which represent potions, hammers, or books, help the players' character speed up, receive more power, or kill in different ways.

If the player(s) take too long to complete a level, a flying devil (much like the ones featured in The Fairyland Story and The NewZealand Story) will come into the level to kill the player(s).

Beating the game normally will result in a bad ending in which only the princess will be saved, but by unlocking a secret set of levels via a shortcut on the first stage, the player(s) will be able to access the good ending in which the king is saved as well.

== Release ==
Don Doko Don was released by Taito in Japan in July 1989.

The game was later ported over to the Family Computer by IPL, and published by Taito on March 9, 1990. A PC Engine version, also ported by IPL, was published by Taito later that same year on May 31. The original arcade version is also featured on the Taito Memories Joukan and Taito Legends 2 arcade game compilations via emulation. The Family Computer version was later re-released on a handheld made by My Arcade, along with Don Doko Don 2 and the Family Computer version of Chack'n Pop. Hamster Corporation released the game as part of their Arcade Archives series for the Nintendo Switch and PlayStation 4 in February 2023.

== Reception and legacy ==
Reception

Review scores
| Publication | Score |
|---|---|
| Computer and Video Games | 94/100 (PCE) |
| Famitsu | 23/40 (Famicom); 25/40 (PCE) |

Don Doko Don enjoyed some success in Japanese arcades. Game Machine listed it as the twelfth most-successful table arcade unit of the month in their August 15, 1989 issue. The later home ports received a rather mixed reception by Famitsu. However, Robert Swan of Computer + Video Games gave the PC Engine port a highly positive review, stating that while "there's nothing new or original about it", it was "playable to the max".

Retrospective views on the game have been mostly positive. Retro Gamer has given the game three positive retrospectives, two for the arcade version, and one for the PC Engine version, due to its inclusion on their "PC Engine GT: Ten Perfect Games" list, all of which praised the game for its basic, yet captivating gameplay, a trait they attributed to most other platform games made by Taito. GamesTM were similarly positive for their two retrospectives (due to the game's inclusion on both Taito Memories Joukan and Taito Legends 2) on the game, although gave it criticism for not being as complex as Bubble Bobble, and other games like it. Hardcore Gaming 101 gave similar criticism, but argued that while "doesn't do much to be original compared to the million other Bubble Bobble-like games at the time", they concluded that it's still worth playing due to the fact that it is "another example of a good platformer game from Taito". Hardcore Gamer, however, was more critical of the game when criticizing the fact that Bubble Bobble was a locked game in Taito Memories Jokan, claiming that while one could "make do" with it and The Fairyland Story, ultimately stated that it was "decaf when you want espresso".

A sequel developed by Natsume, called Don Doko Don 2, was made for the Family Computer as well, but is more of a standard side-scrolling platformer instead.
