= Ben Bero Beh =

1984 video game

- Japanese arcade flyer
- Developer: Taito
- Publisher: Taito
- Platform: Arcade
- Release: JP: November 1984
- Genre: Platform
- Modes: Single-player, multiplayer

Ben Bero Beh (Note: Japanese: べんべろべえ, Hepburn: Ben Bero Bē) is a 1984 platform video game developed and published by Taito for arcades. It was released only in Japan in November 1984. The player guides Dami-chan, a superhero, through an apartment complex which is on fire. Armed with a fire extinguisher, Dami-chan must make his way down the levels avoiding gas explosions, crumbling floors, damaged lighting fixtures, and various enemies that pop out of the doors. The goal is to extinguish the fire and rescue Dami-chan's girlfriend, Nao-chan.

Various characters and gameplay elements from the game would go on to appear in later games made by Taito, particularly Bubble Bobble. The game would later appear on Taito Memories II Jōkan. It was released by Hamster Corporation for the Nintendo Switch and PlayStation 4 as part of their Arcade Archives series in 2020.

== Gameplay ==
Ben Bero Beh is a platform arcade game. The player controls a superhero, Dami-chan, though a series of apartment complexes that are on fire in order to save his girlfriend, Nao-chan. To get though the flaming building, Dami-chan is armed with a fire extinguisher that can put out said fires, as well as manipulate stage hazards in order to get through them. Dami-chan can also jump to avoid fall damage from collapsed floors, enemies that appear from time to time out of the apartment doors, and various other hazards. The quicker the player completes the level, the more bonus points the player gets after completing a level. Cameos of characters from various other Taito games also appear to try to halt Dami-chan's progress, such as the enemy spies from Elevator Action, and Chack'n from Chack'n Pop.

== Reception and legacy ==
Game Machine listed Ben Bero Beh on their November 15, 1984 issue as being the fourth most-successful table arcade unit of the month.
