= Bubble Bobble =

Video game series

- Genre: Platform
- Developer: Taito
- Publisher: Taito
- Platforms: List: Amiga; Amstrad CPC; Apple II; Arcade; Atari ST; Commodore 64; MS-DOS; Family Computer Disk System; Game Boy; Game Boy Color; Game Gear; Master System; MSX2; Nintendo DS; Nintendo Entertainment System; Nintendo Switch; Nintendo Switch 2; Wii; PlayStation; PlayStation 4; PlayStation 5; PlayStation Portable; Sega Saturn; Windows; X68000; Xbox 360; Xbox One; Xbox Series X/S; ZX Spectrum
- First release: Bubble Bobble; June 16, 1986
- Latest release: Bubble Bobble Sugar Dungeons; November 26, 2025

Bubble Bobble (Note: Japanese: バブルボブル) is a platform game series originally developed and published by Taito. The first entry in the series, Bubble Bobble, was released in 1986 as an arcade cabinet. In most entries in the series, players control two dragons named Bub and Bob. This was followed by many sequels in both the main Bubble Bobble series, as well as the spin-off Rainbow Islands and Puzzle Bobble series. They were published for and ported to a wide variety of arcade and home video game consoles. The most recent release in the series is Bubble Bobble Sugar Dungeons in 2025.

== Main series ==
Bubble Bobble series release timeline
1986	Bubble Bobble
1987	Rainbow Islands
1988
1989
1990
1991	Parasol Stars
1992
1993	Bubble Bobble Part 2
1994	Bubble Symphony
1995
1996	Bubble Memories
1997
1998
1999
2000
2001
2002
2003
2004
2005	Rainbow Islands Revolution
2005	Bubble Bobble Revolution
2006	Bubble Bobble Evolution
2007	Bubble Bobble Double Shot
2007	Rainbow Islands Evolution
2008
2009	Bubble Bobble Plus!
2009	Rainbow Islands: Towering Adventure!
2010
2011
2012
2013
2014
2015
2016
2017
2018
2019	Bubble Bobble 4 Friends
2020
2021
2022
2023
2024
2025	Bubble Bobble Sugar Dungeons

=== Bubble Bobble ===
The first game in the Bubble Bobble series is the platform arcade game Bubble Bobble, originally released on June 16, 1986 in Japan. The game puts the players in control of two dragons, a green dragon named Bub and a blue dragon named Bob, who need to save their girlfriends from a world known as the Cave of Monsters. In each level, Bub and Bob must defeat each enemy present by trapping them in bubbles blown from their mouths and then popping the bubbles. The enemies then drop bonus items when they hit the ground. There are 100 levels total, each becoming progressively more difficult. The game was designed around two-player gameplay, and so by inserting another coin the second dragon, Bob, can be controlled.

Bubble Bobble was ported to many home video game consoles, including the Amstrad CPC, Atari ST, ZX Spectrum, Commodore 64, MS-DOS, Apple II, Amiga, Famicom Disk System, Nintendo Entertainment System, MSX2, and Master System. The Master System port featured 200 levels and was released as Final Bubble Bobble in Japan. Ports to the Game Boy in 1991 and the Game Boy Color in 1996 were released as Classic Bubble Bobble.

Five months after release, Game Machine listed Bubble Bobble as the second most successful arcade cabinet of the month. The same publication later listed it as the fifth-highest grossing arcade cabinet in Japan of 1987. Bubble Bobble is considered by many sources to be among the greatest video games of all time.

=== Bubble Bobble Part 2 ===
Bubble Bobble Part 2 is a sequel to Bubble Bobble which had simultaneous development by different teams on the Nintendo Entertainment System and the Game Boy. This led to each version of the game having different storylines while the gameplay was largely unchanged from the original. Both versions of the game were released in 1993.

In the Game Boy version, a character named Robby has to rescue people from a village who have been captured by a floating skull.

In the NES version, Bub's friend Judy is kidnapped by a floating skull. Bub and Bob then turn into dragons and head off to save her. In addition, unlike the original Bubble Bobble, the two players must take turns playing on every other level, rather than playing the levels cooperatively as in other entries in the series. The NES version also includes three bonus games which are located after the player defeats a boss or through a certain door.

In Japan, the NES version of the game was known as Bubble Bobble 2, and the Game Boy version was known as Bubble Bobble Junior.

=== Bubble Symphony ===
Bubble Symphony (also known as Bubble Bobble II), a sequel to Bubble Bobble, was released in 1994 as an arcade game. It makes many changes to the original gameplay formula. The changes that have been made are that a boss is now encountered every five to ten levels, which is similar to a feature in Rainbow Islands, and the player takes a branching route through the levels by selecting one of two doors after every boss. Two new playable female dragons were also added, Kululun (an amber dragon) and Cororon (a pink dragon).

The players can now charge the bubble, and if released when the dragon's horns or bow is glowing, he/she will breathe three bubbles at once, with the specific formation dependent on the character chosen. The players must collect certain square cards with music notes inside, in order to get the four keys that lead to the final world or face an early false ending. Also, the characters have to collect a rod to turn their characters from their dragon to human forms during the course of the game.

The game was ported to Sega Saturn in Japan.

=== Bubble Memories ===
Bubble Memories: The Story of Bubble Bobble III is a sequel to Bubble Symphony, and was released in February 1996 (despite the title screen saying "1995") as an arcade game. In this game, the dragons must climb 80 levels of a tower to defeat the Super Dark Great Dragon and release his control over the tower. To access the last ten levels of the tower, seven potions must be collected, which are then combined into the Magical Rainbow Potion. The tower had previously used the Magical Rainbow Potion as a form of power, before the Potion was shattered by the Super Dark Great Dragon.

Graphically this game is very similar to Bubble Symphony, with the addition of using photographs of animals and plants as the level backgrounds. It also includes a gameplay feature similar to Bubble Symphony's charged bubbles, in this game called Super Bubbles. By holding down the bubble button, the player can produce a giant bubble that can trap multiple enemies or one large enemy.

=== Bubble Bobble Revolution ===
Bubble Bobble Revolution (known in Japan as Bubble Bobble DS) was released on the Nintendo DS in 2005. It includes the entire original Bubble Bobble game, as well as a new mode called New Age, which features new graphics, larger levels, and faster enemies. Similar to Bubble Memories, it features photorealistic backgrounds, this time of Roman-style architecture. Unlike other games in the series, there is no cooperative mode within the New Age mode, instead it is replaced with a 4-player competitive mode, where players compete to earn points.

Notably, this game features a bug in the New Age mode only in the North American release, which causes the boss on level 30 not to spawn, thereby preventing the player from progressing past level 30 and finishing the game. This bug, along with the new graphics, led the game to have a poor reception among critics. The developer of the game later replaced the bugged cartridges with a non-bugged version and also gave out a free copy of Rainbow Islands Revolution to the affected customers as an apology.

=== Bubble Bobble Evolution ===
Bubble Bobble Evolution (known in Japan as Bubble Bobble: Magical Tower Daisakusen!!) was released to PlayStation Portable in 2006. Rather than controlling dragons, in this game the player controls two boys (also named Bub and Bob) dressed in dragon costumes. The game is set in 18th-century London. Evolution also features puzzle elements, with the two characters being split into two towers and being required to perform tasks to allow the other character to progress. These tasks can include flipping levers and transporting items across levels.

This game does away with the photorealistic backgrounds of the previous two main series games, instead using a cartoonish style.

Critics did not receive this game well largely due to the gameplay changes, "monotonous music", graphical changes, and other issues.

=== Bubble Bobble Double Shot ===
Bubble Bobble Double Shot released in 2007 on the Nintendo DS. The gameplay returns to a style similar to the original Bubble Bobble, with only a few twists. The player is able to switch between three dragons (the red dragon named Bubu being new) at will. This means that with three consoles, three players may play together, each controlling a different dragon, while still being able to switch between them. Each dragon blows a bubble matching their color and bubbles of a certain color are required to capture and kill certain enemies. In addition, when the player runs out of lives, they are presented with one of three minigames which, if beaten, allow the player to keep playing the main game.

=== Bubble Bobble Plus! ===
Bubble Bobble Plus! (known in Japan as Bubble Bobble Wii) was released for the Wii in 2009. Later the same year, it released on Xbox 360 as Bubble Bobble Neo!. This game features the same 100 levels from the original Bubble Bobble in "Standard Mode" and 100 more levels in "Arrange Mode", the latter of which also feature a new mechanic, sloped surfaces. There is also "Super" versions of each of these modes, which are harder. This game also has an online leaderboard. The Wii version also has two DLCs which each add 50 more harder maps with a boss at the end.

In all modes, the gameplay is similar to the original Bubble Bobble, but in Arrange Mode there is new music. All modes have graphics clearly inspired by the original, but the dragons are rendered in 3D.

=== Bubble Bobble 4 Friends ===
Bubble Bobble 4 Friends was released in 2019 for the Nintendo Switch and later for the PlayStation 4 and Microsoft Windows. The gameplay is similar to the original Bubble Bobble with the additions of colored wind currents in later levels which control which way bubbles float. It also features boss battles similar to Bubble Symphony and Bubble Memories. In addition, this game allows 4 players to play cooperatively, with 8 lives shared among them. There are 100 levels, the last 50 of which are harder and require the first 50 to be beat to be unlocked. The Steam version of the game also included "The Baron's Workshop", a mode which allows the players to design levels, as well as share their creations with players through the Internet.

== Rainbow Islands ==
=== Rainbow Islands ===
Rainbow Islands: The Story of Bubble Bobble 2 released in 1987 for arcade. This game is a sequel to the original Bubble Bobble and the story takes place right after the events of the previous game. Having defeated their enemy, Bub and Bob are returned to human form, which is the form they take throughout this game. Instead of blowing bubbles, they create rainbows, which they can use to defeat enemies and also as platforms to traverse the levels. The game has 7 levels each divided into 4 sections, with a boss at the end of each level.

It was later ported to ZX Spectrum, Famicom, Commodore 64, Amstrad CPC, Atari ST, Amiga, Nintendo Entertainment System, Master System, NEC PC Engine, Sega Saturn (as Bubble Bobble also featuring Rainbow Islands), PlayStation (as Bubble Bobble also featuring Rainbow Islands), and Game Boy Color.

=== Parasol Stars ===
Parasol Stars: The Story of Bubble Bobble III is a sequel to Rainbow Islands. It was released in 1991 originally for the PC Engine. In this game, Bub and Bob are in their human forms again. The player grabs enemies using parasols, then throws the enemies to turn them into treats on impact. They can also use the parasols to launch the other player. The game features eight main themed worlds, such as Woodland World and Ocean World. Each world is made up of seven screens. However, the game also contains three hidden worlds. Graphically, this game is similar to Rainbow Islands and Bubble Bobble. It was later ported to the Amiga and other devices.

CU Amiga reviewed the game favorably with a 95% rating, praising the "gentle learning curve", graphics, and the addition of minor puzzle elements.

=== Rainbow Islands Revolution ===
Rainbow Islands Revolution is an update of Rainbow Islands released in 2005 for the Nintendo DS. While many features are the same, this game removes the ability to jump or use the rainbows as a platform. These changes are likely due to the change to the way the player controls the character. The player moves Bub or Bob around using the stylus, and rainbows are only used to defeat enemies. However, the stylus must be used to draw the rainbows. The game also adds environmental hazards in the form of spikes and flowing air which push Bub and Bob around. Graphically this game is similar to other entries in this series such as Rainbow Islands and Parasol Stars.

GameSpot reviewed it with a 6.2/10, praising it for including the levels from Rainbow Islands, the new control method, and the new enemies. However, the publication considers the gameplay too "old-school" and the graphics and music too "simplistic". GameZone gave the game a 5.0/10, mentioning about dated graphics and audio.

=== Rainbow Islands Evolution ===
Rainbow Islands Evolution (known in Japan as New Rainbow Island: Hurdy Gurdy Daibōken!!) is a remake of Rainbow Islands for the PlayStation Portable released in 2007. This game features a Mexican theme and replaces Bub and Bob's weapons with hurdy-gurdies. The main adversary is an evil record studio. The rainbows are now limited starting at six at the beginning of the game. In addition, platforms in the foreground and background are added, and the player can travese forwards and backwards in the frame.

The game had mixed reviews. Eurogamer called it a "garish mockery" and gave the game a 4/10. GameSpot reviewed it at 4.5/10, noting the "grating soundtrack" and slow gameplay. GameZone said it "should have been redone with more care" and rated the game at 6/10.

=== Rainbow Islands: Towering Adventure! ===
Rainbow Islands: Towering Adventure! is a sequel to the Rainbow Islands series, but with several major gameplay tweaks. It was released for Wii and Xbox 360 in 2009. There is no longer a health bar, rather a time limit for each of seven levels. Time left over from each level is added onto the next one and getting hit by enemies incurs removes 30 seconds from the timer. There are three modes in this entry: Story Mode, Challenge Mode, and Time Trial. Story Mode is the normal timed experience through the levels. Challenge Mode is the same but if the players die, all of their progress through the levels is lost. Time Trial allows players to try for the fastest time on individual levels.

Towering Adventure! was reviewed middlingly. GamePro gave it a 2.5/5 for a lack of content and being "short". GameSpot gave it a 6/10, praising the cooperative play and the core mechanics, while wanting online cooperative play and more gameplay variety. GamesRadar+ reviewed it at 3 out of 5 stars, calling it "weird", indicating unlikeable characters and boring enemies.

== Puzzle Bobble ==
Many of the characters and musical themes of Bubble Bobble were used by Taito in the tile-matching video game Puzzle Bobble (also known as Bust-a-Move) and its sequels.

- Puzzle Bobble (Bust-a-Move) (1994)
- Puzzle Bobble 2 (Bust-a-Move Again) (1995)
- Puzzle Bobble 3 (Bust-a-Move 3) (1996)
- Puzzle Bobble 4 (Bust-a-Move 4) (1997)
- Puzzle Bobble Mini (Bust-a-Move Pocket) (1999)
- Super Puzzle Bobble (Super Bust-a-Move) (2000)
- Puzzle Bobble Millennium (Bust-a-Move Millennium) (2000)
- Super Puzzle Bobble 2 (Super Bust-a-Move 2) (2002)
- Ultra Puzzle Bobble (Ultra Bust-a-Move) (2004)
- Pullback!! Puzzle Bobble (Bust-a-Move DS) (2005)
- Ultra Puzzle Bobble Pocket (Bust-a-Move Deluxe) (2006)
- Bust-a-Move Bash! (2007)
- Space Puzzle Bobble (Space Bust-a-Move) (2008)
- Puzzle Bobble Plus! (Bust-a-Move Plus!) (2009)
- New Puzzle Bobble (New Bust-a-Move) (2011)
- Tobidasu! Puzzle Bobble 3D (Bust-a-Move Universe) (2011)
- Puzzle Bobble VR: Vacation Odyssey (2021)
- Puzzle Bobble Everybubble! (2023)

== Medal games ==
- Packy's Treasure Slot (1997, medal game)
- Bubblen Roulette (1998, roulette medal game)
- Bubble No KuruKuru Jump! (1999, medal game)
- Bubble Bobble EX (2001, Pachislot)
