= Rainbow Islands Evolution =

2007 video game

- European cover art
- Developer: Marvelous Entertainment
- Publishers: JP: Marvelous Entertainment; EU: Rising Star Games; NA: Ignition Entertainment
- Platform: PlayStation Portable
- Release: JP: February 8, 2007; EU: March 23, 2007; AU: March 29, 2007; NA: January 24, 2008
- Genre: Platform
- Modes: Single-player, multiplayer

Rainbow Islands Evolution is a game in the Bubble Bobble series for the PSP system. It is also known as New Rainbow Island: Hurdy Gurdy Daibōken!! (NEW(ニュー)レインボーアイランド ハーディガーディ大冒険!!, Nyū Reinbō Airando Hādi Gādi Daibōken!!) in Japan. It is an enhanced remake of the arcade game Rainbow Islands.

Bub and Bob, the two main characters in the series, are against an evil recording company that seeks to pollute the Rainbow Islands' atmosphere by creating constant musical noise, therefore wilting the flora and mutating the fauna. Bub and Bob use a hurdy-gurdy as a weapon to create the rainbows.

The game follows the same vertical-scrolling system from the original, but it expands to a third dimension as there are platforms in the background which become accessible through the course of the game.

== Reception ==
Reception

Aggregate score
Aggregator	Score
Metacritic	47/100

Review scores
Publication	Score
4Players	16%
Eurogamer	4/10
Famitsu	16/40
GameSpot	4.5/10
GameZone	6/10
IGN	5/10
Jeuxvideo.com	8/20
PlayStation Official Magazine – UK	4/10
VideoGamer.com	4/10

The game received "generally unfavorable reviews" according to the review aggregation website Metacritic. In Japan, Famitsu gave it a score of 16 out of 40.
