= Bubble Symphony =

1994 video game

- Japanese arcade flyer
- Developer: Taito (Note: Saturn version developed by Ving.)
- Publisher: Taito (Note: Saturn version published by Ving.)
- Director: Hiroyuki Maekawa
- Designers: Yoshitake Shirei; Hiroyuki Maekawa
- Programmers: Harumi Kasuga; Takafumi Kaneko; Kunio Kuzukawa; Takahiro Natani
- Artists: Takaaki Furukawa; Yoshitake Shirei; Toshiaki Ozaki; Akiyoshi Takada
- Composers: Yasuko Yamada; Tamayo Kawamoto
- Series: Bubble Bobble
- Platforms: Arcade, Sega Saturn
- Release: Arcade: JP: October 1994; Saturn: JP: November 27, 1997
- Genre: Platform
- Modes: Single-player, multiplayer
- Arcade system: Taito F3 System

Bubble Symphony (バブルシンフォニー), also known as Bubble Bobble II (バブルボブルII), is a 1994 platform game developed and published by Taito for arcades. It is an installment in the Bubble Bobble series, and takes place after Parasol Stars. A home port of Bubble Symphony for the Sega Saturn was released in 1997. The game was followed by Bubble Memories in 1996.

== Story ==
For this adventure, Bubblun and Bobblun, the familiar green and blue bubble dragons, are joined by girls Kululun (an amber dragon) and Cororon (a pink dragon), but they are stated to be the children of the Bub and Bob of Bubble Bobble.

According to the intro, the four characters (as humans) inadvertently unleash Hyper Drunk, the final boss, while reading books. Hyper Drunk transforms the four into bubble dragons and banishes them to a new world.

=== Cameos ===
The game includes cameos by other Taito characters and settings from The NewZealand Story, Darius, Space Invaders, Arkanoid, Liquid Kids, KiKi KaiKai (including Cindy, known in the Japanese version as Sayo-chan and the English Pocky & Rocky games as Pocky), Yūyu no Quiz de Go! Go!, Pu·Li·Ru·La, and The Fairyland Story.

== Gameplay ==
Screenshot

Although a sequel to Bubble Bobble, the game features few changes to the gameplay formula of that title. The small changes that have been made are that a boss is now encountered every five to ten levels, giving those scenes a similar prominence to Rainbow Islands, and the player takes a branching route through the levels by selecting one of two doors after every boss. The players can now charge the bubble shot; if released when the dragon's horns or bow is glowing, the player character will breathe three bubbles at once, with the specific formation dependent on the character chosen. The players must collect certain square cards with music notes inside, in order to get the 4 keys that lead to the final world or face an early false ending. Also, the characters have to collect a rod to turn their characters from their dragon to human forms during the course of the game.

All the enemies from the original Bubble Bobble appear in this game, along with a lot of newer enemies. The credits (in the arcade version) show all the enemies' names, and those of characters who make cameos from other Taito games.

=== Characters ===
- Bubblun (バブルン) is the well-rounded character; he can fire three grouped bubbles straight ahead when powered up (the bubble button is held for a few seconds then released).
- Bobblun (ボブルン) has faster speed in exchange for shorter range. He can shoot three bubbles in a spread pattern when powered up.
- Kululun (クルルン) has the longest available range, but is slow. She can shoot her bubbles in a "T" pattern (forwards, backwards, and down) when powered up.
- Cororon (コロロン) has the fastest bubble blowing and can shoot her bubbles in an inverted-"T" pattern (forwards, backwards, and up) when powered up.

== Ports ==
The only home port of Bubble Symphony was for the Sega Saturn in Japan in 1997.

The game was included in the Taito Legends 2 compilation for Microsoft Windows in North America and Europe, and on the Xbox in Europe only. It was released on the PlayStation 2 in Japan only, via Taito Memories II Volume 2. The Xbox and PS2 versions run in upscanned 640x448 resolution, which results in slight flickering, no scanlines, and a slightly blurrier image compared to the arcade and Saturn versions. A PlayStation version was completed, and was going to be published by Virgin Interactive Entertainment, but was never released.

Bubble Symphony in its Sega Saturn version is included as a bonus in the 2025 game Bubble Bobble: Sugar Dungeons.

== Soundtrack ==
Bubble Symphony

Soundtrack album
- Released: January 20, 1995
- Genre: Video game soundtrack
- Length: 37:33
- Labels: Pony Canyon, Scitron Label

Bubble Symphony Original Sound Track

Soundtrack album
- Released: July 31, 2013
- Genre: Video game soundtrack
- Length: 27:27
- Label: Zuntata / Taito Corp (distributed by iTunes Store)

Bubble Symphony (バブルシンフォニー) is a video game soundtrack that was released on CD and published by Pony Canyon and Scitron Label on January 20, 1995, in Japan. Tracks 1, 2 and 22 were arranged by Yasuko Yamada, Yasutaka Mizushima and Tamayo Kawamoto.

Bubble Symphony Original Sound Track (バブルシンフォニー オリジナルサウンドトラック) was released by Zuntata Records and Taito Corp on July 31, 2013, in Japan.

== Reception ==
In Japan, Game Machine listed Bubble Symphony as the fourth most successful table arcade game of 1994.
