= Puzzle Bobble Plus! =

2009 video game

- Developers: Taito; Rencom; Dreams Inc.
- Publishers: JP: Taito; WW: Square Enix
- Platforms: Wii, Xbox 360
- Release: Wii: JP: April 7, 2009; PAL: June 26, 2009; NA: July 6, 2009; Xbox 360: WW: September 30, 2009
- Genre: Puzzle
- Modes: Single-player, multiplayer

Puzzle Bobble Plus!, known in North America as Bust-A-Move Plus!, and in Japan as Puzzle Bobble Wii (パズルボブル Wii, Pazuru Boburu Wii), is a Puzzle video game developed by Taito. It was released for the WiiWare platform in Japan on April 7, 2009, while Square Enix released it in PAL regions on June 26, and in North America on July 6. It was later ported to the Xbox 360's Xbox Live Arcade service under the name of Puzzle Bobble Live! (Bust-a-Move Live! in North America) and released on September 30, 2009.

== Gameplay ==
In each stage, players aim the cannon (helmed by Bubble Bobble's Bub and Bob) at the bottom of the screen, using it to shoot differently colored bubbles at a hanging arrangement of bubbles at the top of the screen to make them disappear within a time limit. Players must match three bubbles of the same color to get rid of them, with each stage being completed when all the bubbles have been cleared.

The game also features a battle mode that pits players against another opponent. Additional stages from previous games were also available as paid downloadable content. They were sold for 200 Wii Points each.

== Reception ==
Reception

Aggregate score
Aggregator	Score
Metacritic	70/100

Review scores
Publication	Score
IGN	7/10
Nintendo Life	7/10
Official Nintendo Magazine	75%

The game received "mixed or average reviews" according to the review aggregation website Metacritic.
