= Bubble Bobble Plus! =

- Xbox Live Arcade cover art
- Developers: Taito; Dreams Inc.
- Publishers: JP: Taito; WW: Square Enix
- Designer: Fukio Mitsuji
- Series: Bubble Bobble
- Platforms: Wii, Xbox 360
- Release: Wii: JP: February 10, 2009; PAL: April 10, 2009; NA: May 25, 2009; Xbox 360: JP: August 5, 2009; WW: September 16, 2009
- Genre: Platform
- Modes: Single-player, multiplayer

Bubble Bobble Plus! (Known in Japan as Bubble Bobble Wii (バブルボブル Wii, Baburu Boburu Wii)) is a platform video game developed by Taito and Dreams, Inc., and a remake of the 1986 arcade game Bubble Bobble. It was originally released for WiiWare in Japan on February 10, 2009, in the PAL regions on April 10, and in North America on May 25. It was later ported to the Xbox 360's Xbox Live Arcade service under the name of Bubble Bobble Neo! (バブルボブル Neo(ネオ)!, Baburu Boburu Neo!)) and released on August 5, 2009 in Japan, and in North America and Europe on September 16.

== Gameplay ==
As in previous games, the player will have to defeat all enemies across multiple screens by trapping them in bubbles and popping them. The normal mode features the original two playable characters, Bub and Bob. At the same time, the Arrange Mode adds support for up to four players, joined with female characters Peb and Pab, as yellow and pink bubble dragons respectively.

The game contains several playing modes - a remake containing 100 classic stages and a new story mode with 100 new stages, as well as more difficult "Super" versions of those stages.

In addition, for Bubble Bobble Plus!, two downloadable content packs (Extra 1 and Extra 2) were released consisting of 50 "very hard" stages each, as well as new boss characters. These Extra modes also include four player support.

== Reception ==
Reception

Aggregate score
Aggregator	Score	
Aggregator	Wii	Xbox 360
Metacritic	76/100	70/100

Review scores
Publication	Score	
Publication	Wii	Xbox 360
GamePro	4.5/5	N/A
GameSpot	N/A	7/10
Hardcore Gamer	3.5/5	N/A
IGN	8/10	7.9/10
Jeuxvideo.com	13/20	N/A
Nintendo Life	8/10	N/A
Nintendo World Report	6/10	N/A
Official Nintendo Magazine	74%	N/A
Official Xbox Magazine (UK)	N/A	6/10
Official Xbox Magazine (US)	N/A	6/10
Teletext GameCentral	8/10	N/A

Bubble Bobble Plus! received "generally favorable reviews", while Bubble Bobble Neo! received "mixed or average reviews", according to the review aggregation website Metacritic. N-Europe praised the Wii version, saying it had a wealth of content to enjoy, while the downloadable packs were fairly reasonably priced and offered a significantly ramped up challenge from the standard levels.
