= Puzzle Bobble 4 =

1997 video game

- Japanese arcade flyer
- Developer: Taito
- Publishers: Taito: PlayStation; JP: Taito; NA: Natsume Inc.; PAL: Acclaim Entertainment Dreamcast; JP: CyberFront; NA/PAL: Acclaim Entertainment (Note: Released under the Club Acclaim label) Game Boy Color; JP: Altron; NA/PAL: Acclaim Entertainment Windows; NA: Interplay Entertainment; PAL: Agetec
- Director: Kazuhiro Ohara
- Designer: Seiichi Nakakuki
- Programmers: Nobutake Nakamura; Sayo Kihara; Takanori Emoto; Hiroshi Maruyama; Yuichi Onogi
- Composer: Rimiko Horiuchi
- Series: Puzzle Bobble
- Platforms: Arcade, PlayStation, Game Boy Color, Windows, Dreamcast
- Release: December 1997: Arcade; WW: December 1997 PlayStation; JP: August 6, 1998; NA: December 9, 1998; EU: April 15, 1999 Game Boy Color; NA: May 1999; JP: April 28, 2000 Windows; EU: November 1999; NA: January 31, 2000 Dreamcast; JP: March 16, 2000; NA: June 1, 2000; EU: June 9, 2000
- Genre: Puzzle
- Modes: Single-player, multiplayer
- Arcade system: Taito F3 System

Puzzle Bobble 4, also known as Bust-A-Move 4 for the North American and European console versions, is an arcade puzzle video game developed and published by Taito for their F3 System hardware board. It is the third sequel to the video game Puzzle Bobble, as well as the final installment in the series for the PlayStation and the only title in the series for the Dreamcast.

== Plot ==
On the planet Bubbleluna lives the twins Bub and Bob. One day, the sun fails to rise because the Fairy of the Night, Cleon, has stolen the light source known as the Rainbow for Full-Moon Madame Luna. She splits this rainbow into seven light bubbles. Bub and Bob then set off to retrieve these bubbles and restore the light and peace to their planet.

== Gameplay ==
The game features a total of 640 levels. This installment of the series introduces two new features: the pulley system and chain reactions. The pulley system consists of two groups of bubbles attached to either side of a pulley. Popping some on one side will cause that side to be "lighter" and therefore rise. The other side lowers in response. If a pulley is shaking and a bubble is attached, the resulting heavier side will lower. This requires added strategy to prevent one side from moving too far and therefore losing the game. One possible strategy is to form a bubble cluster between two pulleys to prevent them from lowering or rising at all. Then the player can triangulate until acquiring the necessary bubbles to clear both anchor bubbles, while still keeping both ends of the pulley clustered together.

Chain reactions occur only on the two player (or player and CPU) modes. When a bubble is dropped, it can move to another place on the board if this causes more bubbles to pop. If this, in turn, causes more bubbles to drop, then the chain reaction can continue.

=== Play Modes ===
- Puzzle Mode consists of a field of stages labelled A-Z, in a triangle. To proceed to either the stages B or C, the player must complete A. This continues, meaning there are many possible routes to completing the puzzle mode.
- Story Puzzle consists of a backdrop with 22 tarot cards superimposed on it. The aim is to complete each of the tarot card stages, gaining that tarot card once its group of rounds is completed. New tarot cards are revealed when each of the stages currently shown is completed.
- Story Versus follows the player's chosen character in their adventure to regain the seven light bubbles and do whatever it was that character planned with them. They must face each character of the main characters and defeat them to move on (in the case of the character not being Bub or Bob, they also must face a clone of themselves), in a linear fashion. Eventually, they will reach Madame Luna and upon her defeat, she will be revealed to be Dreg, the main antagonist in the series. Any character can be chosen for this mode except the unlockable characters.
- Win Contest is a simple tournament where the player must fight and defeat as many opponents as possible. The more are defeated before losing, the more of a picture of the character is revealed. In this mode, is it possible to meet new characters who do not appear in the other modes; once encountered, they can be used in other modes. After defeating each character once, frequent matches will strengthen each one, making it harder and harder to win.
- Player Vs Player is a multiplayer mode.
- Challenge Mode ranks skill. The ranks are "10th Class", "1st Class", "1st Honor" and "Expert".
- Edit Mode allows to create maps. Up to 25 can be made and played. Once all the maps created have been completed, an ending is displayed.

== Reception ==
=== Critical reception ===
Reception

Aggregate scores
Aggregator	Score			
Aggregator	Dreamcast	GBC	PC	PS
GameRankings	78.25%	N/A	68.60%	79.78%
Metacritic	79%	N/A	N/A	N/A

Review scores
Publication	Score			
Publication	Dreamcast	GBC	PC	PS
GameSpot	7.2/10	7/10	6.8/10	7.9/10
IGN	8.8/10	7/10	6.4/10	7.5/10

In Japan, Game Machine listed Puzzle Bobble 4 on their April 1, 1998 issue as being the eighth most-successful arcade game of the month. Like the second Puzzle Bobble game, PC Zone shunned the Windows version for its bad performance on low resolution and older PCs, scoring it 30%.

=== Promotion ===
The game was showcased at the February 1998 AOU Amusement Expo in Japan.
