= Ultra Bust-a-Move =

2004 video game

Ultra Bust-A-Move
- North American box art
- Developers: Dreams Co., Ltd.
- Publishers: JP: Taito; NA: Majesco; PAL: 505 GameStreet
- Series: Puzzle Bobble
- Platform: Xbox
- Release: NA: November 4, 2004; JP: January 27, 2005; PAL: May 19, 2006
- Genre: Puzzle
- Modes: Single-player, multiplayer

Ultra Bust-a-Move, released in Japan as Ultra Puzzle Bobble (ウルトラパズルボブル, Urutora Pazuru Boburu), is a 2004 puzzle video game developed by Dreams Co., Ltd. and published by Taito for the Xbox.

The game was the first in the Puzzle Bobble series to have online play via Xbox Live. Although this functionality stopped working in April 2010, the community-made Xbox Live replacement servers Insignia have since re-enabled online play.

== Reception ==
Reception

Aggregate score
Aggregator	Score
Metacritic	74/100

Review scores
Publication	Score
Famitsu	24/40
Game Informer	7/10
GameSpot	7.1/10
GameZone	7.4/10
IGN	7.3/10
Official Xbox Magazine (US)	8.8/10
TeamXbox	7/10

Ultra Bust-a-Move received "average" reviews according to the review aggregation website Metacritic. In Japan, Famitsu gave the game a score of 24 out of 40.
