= Chack'n Pop =

1984 video game

- Sales flyer
- Developer: Taito
- Publisher: Taito
- Designers: Hiroshi Sakai; Hiroyuki Sakô
- Programmer: Jun Ishioka
- Platforms: Arcade, FM-7, Family Computer, MSX, NEC PC-6001, NEC PC-8801, X1, SG-1000
- Release: JP: April 1984
- Genre: Platform
- Modes: Single-player, multiplayer

Chack'n Pop (Note: Japanese: ちゃっくんぽっぷ, Hepburn: Chakkun Poppu) is a 1984 platform video game developed and published by Taito for arcades. It was originally released in Japan in April 1984. It is considered to be a spiritual predecessor of Bubble Bobble due to their shared characters and similar game structure. Home ports were released for the SG-1000, MSX, Family Computer, Sharp X1, NEC PC-6001 and NEC PC-8801.

== Gameplay ==
Arcade screenshot

Chack'n Pop is a platform arcade game. The player controls Chack'n, a yellow creature with extendable legs, through a series of single-screen mazes. He is capable of walking on floors or ceilings, but not walls. He can climb steps and traverse high walls by extending his legs until he is tall enough to pass on to the next step. He is also capable of throwing hand grenades to his left or right which, after a short time, explode into a cloud of smoke. Separate fire buttons control rolling to the left or right. Chack'n is killed if he is caught in the explosion cloud. He is delayed in this process by a series of solid walls. In order to get past the walls, he must free hearts from cages using his hand grenades.

A further obstruction comes in the form of Monstas hatching from eggs. All or none of the Monstas can be destroyed for a bonus at the end of the level. Each screen is played with a time limit, marked by a Mighta pushing a boulder along the top of the screen.

== Development and release ==
Chack'n Pop was released by Taito around April 1984 in Japan, despite the copyright notice of the game saying 1983. The game started off at the University of Tokyo's Microcomputer Club, as a game developed for the Hitachi Basic Master Level 3 by Hiroshi Sakai, a Game Arts developer who was a student at the university at the time. Taito later bought the rights to the game, and started development on an arcade version under the working name Chack'n Chack, with Hiroyuki Sakô on character and level design, and Jun Ishioka on programming. Sakô thought the main character in the original microcomputer version was not cute, thus leading him to design the Chack'n character. Around the middle of development, they had to burn an EEPROM each time they wanted to check the on-screen colors, which made them design a daughterboard so that the colors could be displayed immediately without the need of an EEPROM.

=== Conversions ===
Taito ported the game to the MSX, Family Computer, Sharp X1, NEC PC-6001 and NEC PC-8801. Sega developed and published a version of the game for the SG-1000.

An emulated arcade version is included in Taito Legends Power-Up, Taito Memories Pocket, Taito Memories Gekan, Taito Legends 2, and Taito Milestones. The Family Computer version was re-released on the Nintendo Wii and Nintendo 3DS via the Virtual Console service. A port of the arcade version was released on the PlayStation 4 and Nintendo Switch as part of the Arcade Archives initiative by Hamster Corporation., as well as their Console Archives series in October 2026. This port features online leaderboards and new gameplay modes.

The Family Computer version is included on the MyArcade Don Doko Don Pocket Player unit, along with the Family Computer version of Don Doko Don, as well as Don Doko Don 2. An emulated version of the arcade version would appear on the Taito Egret II Mini as part of its default game lineup.

== Reception ==
Sakô felt the game flopped in Japanese arcades due to its difficulty. However, the home ports, specifically the Family Computer and MSX versions of the game, sold much better and became one of Taito's "top IPs".

Retrospective views on Chack'n Pop have been mostly negative. A mini review on a retrospective of The NewZealand Story found in an issue of Retro Gamer claimed the game "wasn't a great platformer" due to how complex it is. PC Zone said the game "isn't much fun", despite the ideas it presented for the time, and the fact that it was Bubble Bobble's predecessor. Rhody Tobin of HonestGamers slammed the Family Computer version for its controls, gameplay, and presentation, and while admitting that the game is "vaguely interesting", he said it is "best forgotten". A more positive review came from Alex Kidman of Kotaku Australia, where he briefly reviewed the Family Computer version, and while he recommended it for fans of Bubble Bobble, he noted that it is a very different game compared to Bubble Bobble.

== Legacy ==
Chack'n Pop is often considered to be one of the spiritual predecessors to Bubble Bobble, mostly due to the similar gameplay structure and shared characters. The Monstas and Mightas would later appear as common enemies in Bubble Bobble. Chack'n and other characters from Chack'n Pop has appeared in various other Taito games as cameos, such as Ben Bero Beh, Bubble Bobble, Bubble Memories, and NY Captor.
