= Super Puzzle Bobble =

2000 video game

- Japanese PlayStation 2 box art
- Developers: Taito; Altron (GBA version)
- Publishers: Taito: PlayStation 2; JP: Taito; WW: Acclaim Entertainment Game Boy Advance; JP: Taito; WW: Ubi Soft Windows; JP: CyberFront; WW: EON Digital Entertainment GameCube; JP: Taito; WW: Ubi Soft
- Series: Puzzle Bobble
- Platforms: PlayStation 2 Windows; Game Boy Advance; GameCube; Mobile phone
- Release: September 28, 2000: PlayStation 2; JP: September 28, 2000; NA: November 27, 2000; PAL: December 22, 2000 Windows; JP: September 7, 2001; NA: October 19, 2001 Game Boy Advance; NA: November 7, 2001; PAL: November 30, 2001; JP: December 21, 2001 GameCube; NA: February 12, 2003; JP: February 27, 2003; EU: September 5, 2003 Mobile December 11, 2004
- Genre: Puzzle
- Modes: Single-player, multiplayer

Super Puzzle Bobble (スーパーパズルボブル, Sūpā Pazuru Boburu), released as Super Bust-A-Move in Europe and North America, is a puzzle video game in the Puzzle Bobble series. It was developed by Taito, and released on November 27, 2000 by Acclaim Entertainment for the PlayStation 2, and by CyberFront and EON Digital Entertainment for Windows in 2001. It was later ported to the Game Boy Advance that same year, the Japanese version under the name Super Puzzle Bobble Advance (スーパーパズルボブルアドバンス, Sūpā Pazuru Boburu Adobansu). It was re-released in Japan for the PlayStation 2 in 2004 as part of Super Puzzle Bobble DX (スーパーパズルボブルDX, Sūpā Pazuru Boburu DX) (along with its sequel, Super Puzzle Bobble 2), which is Volume 62 of the Japan-exclusive Simple 2000 Series. This compilation includes a few graphical enhancements.

Super Puzzle Bobble was ported to the GameCube in 2003, under the name of Super Puzzle Bobble All-Stars (スーパーパズルボブル オールスターズ, Sūpā Pazuru Boburu Ōru Sutāzu) in Japan, Super Bust-A-Move All-Stars in Europe, and Bust-A-Move 3000 in North America. The game is a direct port, except for the inclusion of new backgrounds and remixed music. It also features new box artwork, more in line with the in-game artwork.

It is the first mainstream game in the series not to see an arcade release, although there is an arcade game with the same title, which is a completely different game to this one.

== Gameplay ==
Super Puzzle Bobble gameplay is essentially the same as the rest of the series. It bestows some audiovisual improvements, adds and removes gameplay elements, adds a new art style, and adds a new character roster. It has single player, training, computer competition, and two player competition modes. New to this game are large-sized bubbles and a two player cooperation mode, in which players work together to solve a stage.

The GameCube All-Stars version has a four player option and a Space Invaders-style mode called "Shoot Bubble".

== Promotion ==
The game was showcased at the February 1999 AOU Amusement Expo in Japan.

Similar to Bust-A-Move 2 Arcade Edition, the original PlayStation 2 version in North American and Europe releases had unusually strange cover art, consisting of a photorealistic baby wearing shades and blowing a red bubble. It was included on a 2003 list published by GameSpy of the "Top Ten Worst Covers". Other versions of the game including the later GameCube release would instead feature cover art more reminiscent of the game, featuring the game's core cast of playable characters.

== Reception ==
Reception

Aggregate score
Aggregator	Score		
Aggregator	GBA	GameCube	PS2
Metacritic	77/100	53/100	75/100

Review scores
Publication	Score		
Publication	GBA	GameCube	PS2
AllGame	2.5/5	2/5	2/5
Electronic Gaming Monthly	N/A	N/A	7.5/10
EP Daily	N/A	N/A	6/10
Famitsu	24/40	26/40	28/40
Game Informer	6.75/10	N/A	7/10
GameFan	N/A	N/A	83% (Note: Three critics of GameFan gave the Japanese PlayStation 2 import each a score of 89, 82, and 79.)
GameSpot	8/10	5/10	5.4/10
GameZone	8/10	N/A	5/10
IGN	8.8/10	N/A	7/10
Next Generation	N/A	N/A	3/5
Nintendo Power	3.4/5	3/5	N/A
Official U.S. PlayStation Magazine	N/A	N/A	3/5

The PlayStation 2 and Game Boy Advance versions received "generally favorable reviews", while Bust-A-Move 3000 received "mixed" reviews, according to the review aggregation website Metacritic. In Japan, Famitsu gave it a score of 28 out of 40 for the PS2 version, 24 out of 40 for the Game Boy Advance version, and 26 out of 40 for the All-Stars edition.

Ryan Davis of GameSpot said the PS2 version has the best graphics and sound of the series to date, "with extraordinarily sharp 2D graphics and a healthy amount of visual splendor", but that its gameplay represents an "incredibly stripped-down" disappointment to the series which "brings virtually nothing new to the franchise" and is missing a lot of features from the previous year's Bust-a-Move 4. As for BAM3000, there was nothing new and the analog controls were awkward, but the multiple gameplay modes kept players happy. Geraint Evans of NGC Magazine regarded the game as worth owning, but only on one console. Tom Russo of NextGen found the Japanese PS2 import a bit disappointing and no different from the original game.

Human Tornado of GamePro said of the PlayStation 2 version in one review, "Super Bust A Move for the PS2 is the best puzzle game for the system almost by default. Fantavision has prettier graphics, but the time-tested gameplay in Bust A Move makes the switch to the PS2 nicely. It's not a must have, but Taito's new Super Bust A Move has a lot of challenge for gamers who want an action puzzle game." (Note: GamePro gave the PlayStation 2 version 3/5 for graphics, two 3.5/5 scores for sound and fun factor, and 4/5 for control in one review.) In another GamePro review, Uncle Dust said of the same console version, "For those who must have the most recent version of Bust-A-Move, or for puzzle fans without a PS one, this is a good game. Yet Super Bust-A-Move's limited new features and graphics, along with the PS2's backward compatibility, make it kind of silly to spend the extra bucks on this latest version." (Note: GamePro gave the PlayStation 2 version three 3.5/5 scores for graphics, sound, and fun factor, and 4.5/5 for control in another review.)

The PlayStation 2 version was a runner-up for "Puzzle Game of 2000" in Editors' Choice, but won the same award in Readers' Choice at IGN's Best of 2000 Awards for PlayStation 2.
