= Bubble Bobble Double Shot =

2007 video game

- European cover art
- Developer: Dreams
- Publishers: PAL: Rising Star Games; NA: Ignition Entertainment
- Series: Bubble Bobble
- Platform: Nintendo DS
- Release: EU: March 23, 2007; AU: April 5, 2007; NA: February 26, 2008
- Genres: Platform, action
- Modes: Single player, multiplayer

Bubble Bobble Double Shot is a platform action game for the Nintendo DS, part of the Bubble Bobble series. It was released in Europe on March 23, 2007 and Australia on April 5, 2007 by Rising Star Games, and by Ignition Entertainment in North America on February 26, 2008.

== Plot ==
The story involves Bub and Bob visiting their cousin Bubu (an orange/red bubble dragon) and their grandfather. In the attic of their house, they find a treasure map. They decide to explore the island that Bubu resides on to search for treasure.

== Gameplay ==
The gameplay uses similar mechanics to the original Bubble Bobble game - the standard way to kill enemies is as usual: blowing a bubble to trap them and then popping the bubble before they can escape. Each stage is laid out over the Nintendo DS's dual screens, so there is no scrolling. The game also supports co-operative multiplayer for multiple DS cards, for up to three players.

One of the newest features of Double Shot is the color scheme. Players can switch between Bub, Bob and Bubu on the fly, with each character shooting a different color bubble. As usual, Bub shoots green bubbles, Bob shoots blue bubbles and Bubu shoots red bubbles. However, a gameplay change is that some enemies can only be attacked by a bubble of a specific color, while others require being trapped by two bubbles of different colors. Every 10 levels, there is a boss stage, and there are 100 stages in all. If the player loses all lives, a touch screen minigame must be successfully completed in order to continue.

== Reception ==
Reception

Aggregate score
Aggregator	Score
Metacritic	50/100

Review scores
Publication	Score
4Players	70%
Eurogamer	2/10
GamesRadar+	1.5/5
GameZone	5.2/10
IGN	5.9/10
Jeuxvideo.com	10/20
NGamer	50%
Official Nintendo Magazine	40%
Pocket Gamer	1.5/5
Retro Gamer	76%

The game received "mixed" reviews according to the review aggregation website Metacritic. Official Nintendo Magazine criticized the game for lack of seriously new gameplay features, rendering mechanics such as the ability to switch between Bub, Bob and Bubu, and stated that completing a minigame in order to pass a game over was completely pointless.
