= Rainbow Islands: Towering Adventure! =

2009 video game

- Developer: Taito
- Publishers: JP: Taito; WW: Square Enix
- Series: Rainbow Islands
- Platforms: Wii, Xbox 360
- Release: Wii: JP: March 3, 2009; PAL: May 8, 2009; NA: June 15, 2009; Xbox 360: WW: October 28, 2009
- Genre: Platform
- Modes: Single-player, multiplayer

Rainbow Islands: Towering Adventure! is a video game developed by Taito for WiiWare and Xbox Live Arcade. It is the latest installment in the Rainbow Islands series. The game was released in Japan on March 3, 2009, in the PAL regions on May 8, and in North America on June 15. The Xbox Live Arcade version was released on October 28 the same year.

== Gameplay ==
As a spin-off of the Bubble Bobble series, the game features slightly similar gameplay. The player can play as either Bubblun or Bobblun ("Bubby" and "Bobby", more commonly known as "Bub" and "Bob"), or both, who have to make their way to the top of several long, vertical stages with the aid of rainbows, which they can create.

Instead of health or a set number of lives, the game uses a time limit, which ends the game if it reaches zero. Getting hit by enemies will lose valuable seconds, but defeating enemies with rainbows will sprout forth gems that can replenish time. By defeating multiple enemies in a row, more valuable gems with bigger time bonuses are awarded. At certain points in the game, Dr Crescent will attack from below in one of his machines. Players can either try to defeat him, or evade him until the next checkpoint. By collecting seven colored gems, players can use a special attack against these mini-bosses.

In the Xbox Live Arcade version, players can use their Avatars in the Time Attack and Challenge modes.

== Reception ==
Reception

Aggregate score
| Aggregator | Score | |
| Aggregator | Wii | Xbox 360 |
|---|---|---|
| Metacritic | 53/100 | 62/100 |

Review scores
| Publication | Score | |
| Publication | Wii | Xbox 360 |
|---|---|---|
| GamePro | 2.5/5 | N/A |
| GameSpot | N/A | 6/10 |
| GamesRadar+ | 3/5 | N/A |
| IGN | 6/10 | 7.2/10 |
| Nintendo Life | 5/10 | N/A |
| Official Nintendo Magazine | 60% | N/A |
| Official Xbox Magazine (US) | N/A | 6/10 |
| Retro Gamer | 33% | N/A |
| Teletext GameCentral | 4/10 | N/A |

The game received "mixed" reviews on both platforms according to the review aggregation website Metacritic.

IGN reviewer Lucas M. Thomas disliked the Wii version's stiff gameplay and mediocre sound, calling the game a "fair" conversion of the arcade original Rainbow Islands game design for WiiWare. Daemon Hatfield, also of IGN, called the Xbox 360 version "a fun little arcade game" that has a couple of unusual tricks within the gameplay.
