= Bubble Bobble Evolution =

2006 video game

- U.S. cover art
- Developer: Digital Whip
- Publishers: JP: Marvelous Entertainment; NA: Codemasters; PAL: Rising Star Games
- Platform: PlayStation Portable
- Release: JP: August 31, 2006; EU: September 29, 2006; AU: October 19, 2006; NA: December 19, 2006
- Genres: Platform, puzzle
- Modes: Single-player, multiplayer

Bubble Bobble Evolution (Note: Japanese: バブルボブル 〜マジカルタワー大作戦!!〜, Hepburn: Baburu Boburu 〜Majikaru Tawā Daisakusen!!〜) is a game in the Bubble Bobble series released for the PSP system in 2006.

Bub and Bob, the two main characters in the series, have been trapped in costumed versions of their bubble dragon forms (instead of physically into bubble dragons) and are separated into each of the two Towers of Entertainment. Bub and Bob must traverse the towers while defeating the various enemies inside it.

The game's levels are in a cylindrical structure, and there are puzzles that must be completed to progress, such as activating switches and moving items.

== Reception ==
Reception

Aggregate score
Aggregator	Score
Metacritic	47/100

Review scores
Publication	Score
Famitsu	24/40
GameSpot	4.6/10
GamesTM	5.9/10
GameZone	5/10
IGN	4.3/10
Jeuxvideo.com	10/20
PlayStation Official Magazine – UK	5/10
PSM3	53%
Retro Gamer	62%

Bubble Bobble Evolution received "generally unfavorable reviews" according to the review aggregation website Metacritic. In Japan, Famitsu gave it a score of 24 out of 40.
