= New Puzzle Bobble =

2011 video game

- Title screen
- Developer: Moss
- Publisher: Taito
- Director: Kento Takeda
- Producer: Akihiro Nara
- Programmer: Takeshi Sasaki
- Composer: Ryo Yamazaki
- Series: Puzzle Bobble
- Platform: iOS
- Release: February 4, 2011; New Puzzle Bobble HD; March 9, 2011
- Genres: Tile-matching, Puzzle
- Mode: Single-player

New Puzzle Bobble (ニューパズルボブル, Nyū Pazuru Boburu), also known as New Bust-a-Move, is a tile-matching puzzle video game developed by Moss and published by Taito for iOS. The game was released worldwide on February 4, 2011, followed by the HD version on March 9, and features integration with Game Center.

== Reception ==
Reception

Aggregate score
Aggregator	Score
Metacritic	70/100

Review scores
Publication	Score
IGN	6.5/10
Pocket Gamer	3.5/5 stars
TouchArcade	3/5 stars

The game received "mixed or average reviews" according to the review aggregation website Metacritic.
