= Rainbow Islands Revolution =

2005 video game

- Box art (EU)
- Developer: Marvelous Entertainment
- Publishers: JP: Taito; PAL: Rising Star Games; NA: Codemasters
- Platform: Nintendo DS
- Release: JP: 2005; PAL: 28 April 2006; NA: 2006
- Genre: Platform
- Mode: Single-player

Rainbow Islands Revolution, known in Japan as New Rainbow Islands (ニューレインボーアイランド), is a platformer game developed by Marvelous for the Nintendo DS. It is an update to the 1987 arcade game Rainbow Islands and thus part of the Bubble Bobble series. Unlike in the original, the main character, Bub, rides in a bubble; the player must guide him and draw rainbows with the stylus. The game uses mainly the DS's touch screen.

== Gameplay ==
The player drags Bub around using the stylus. Contact with enemies or dangerous objects such as spikes causes the player to lose a heart. When all hearts have been lost, the player loses a life and must begin the level anew.

When the player drags the stylus anywhere on the screen besides on Bub, the player can create a rainbow. The rainbow serves as a barrier through which enemies cannot cross. If a rainbow is drawn over an enemy, the enemy is killed. Additionally, when the player taps a rainbow, it falls down, removing any enemies that lie below. The player can also draw special shapes that create rainbows with special effects.

== Reception ==
Reception

Aggregate score
Aggregator	Score
Metacritic	54/100

Review scores
Publication	Score
4Players	63%
Eurogamer	6/10
Famitsu	26/40
GameSpot	6.2/10
GameZone	5/10
IGN	5/10
NGC Magazine	68%
Nintendo Power	4.5/10
Pocket Gamer	2/5
Retro Gamer	51%

The game received "mixed" reviews according to the review aggregation website Metacritic. In Japan, Famitsu gave it a score of two sevens and two sixes for a total of 26 out of 40.
