= Don Doko Don 2 =

1992 video game

- Developer: Natsume
- Publisher: Taito
- Platform: Famicom
- Release: JP: January 31, 1992
- Genre: Platform
- Mode: Single-player

Don Doko Don 2 (Note: Japanese: ドンドコドン 2, Hepburn: Dondokodon 2) is a 1992 side-scrolling 2D platform game developed by Natsume and published by Taito for the Famicom. It was only released in Japan. It is the sequel to the arcade game Don Doko Don.

The game was released as part of the limited edition Pocket Player handheld by My Arcade worldwide in January 2020, alongside its predecessor and Chack'n Pop.

== Plot ==
According to the opening cutscene, the Prince of the land is going to marry the Princess until a mysterious crow comes and turns the Prince into a frog with a strange potion. The Princess faints from horrible shock. The news gets out to the land and a witch summons the bearded dwarves to receive the ingredients of the antidote (the bags that appear at the end of each stage) and turn the Prince back to normal so they may continue the royal wedding.

== Gameplay ==
Similar to the original Don Doko Don, the player controls Bob, a bearded dwarf wielding a hammer to flatten enemies and throw them, but unlike the original, this version is single-player only and a side-scroller. The game consists of five stages, each having a boss battle at the end. The player's goal is to reach the end of each stage, defeat a boss and collect a bag containing an ingredient for the antidote to advance to the next stage.
