= Super Puzzle Bobble 2 =

2002 video game

- Japanese version cover art
- Developer: Taito
- Publishers: JP: Taito; NA/PAL: Ubi Soft
- Series: Puzzle Bobble
- Platform: PlayStation 2
- Release: JP: September 19, 2002; PAL: September 20, 2002; NA: September 24, 2002
- Genre: Puzzle
- Modes: Single-player, multiplayer

Super Puzzle Bobble 2 (スーパーパズルボブル2, Sūpā Pazuru Boburu Tsu), released as Super Bust-A-Move 2 in North America and Europe, is a puzzle video game in the Puzzle Bobble series developed by Taito, and was released in 2002 for the PlayStation 2.

== Gameplay ==
Super Puzzle Bobble 2 incorporates pretty much the same elements as the previous games. The gameplay has its own story mode, endless puzzle mode, battle mode, two player competitive battle mode and lastly an edit mode, which allows players to create their own customized rounds.

== Modes ==
There are more several modes more than the original games, including:

- Story Mode
- Puzzle Mode
- CPU Battle
- 2 Player Battle
- Edit Mode

== Reception ==
Reception

Aggregate score
Aggregator	Score
Metacritic	73/100

Review scores
Publication	Score
Consoles +	88%
EP Daily	7/10
Famitsu	26/40
Game Informer	7.5/10
GamePro	5/5
GameRevolution	B
GameSpot	4.4/10
IGN	7.3/10
Official U.S. PlayStation Magazine	3.5/5
X-Play	3/5

The game received "mixed or average reviews" according to the review aggregation website Metacritic. In Japan, Famitsu gave it a score of 26 out of 40.

Ryan Davis of GameSpot said the game had bad presentation, video clips and voices and was not worth the attention of anyone but those who were really into Bust-a-Move, but the gameplay was just as fun and challenging. Jeremy Dunham of IGN gave credit to the developer, pleased that the gameplay remained the same and faithful to its predecessors.
