= The NewZealand Story =

1988 video game

- Japanese arcade flyer
- Developers: Taito; Software Creations (NES)
- Publisher: Taito
- Composers: Yasuko Yamada; Yasuhisa Watanabe (arcade); Tim Follin; Geoff Follin (NES)
- Platform: Arcade: Commodore 64, Amstrad CPC, ZX Spectrum, Amiga, Atari ST, FM Towns, X68000, Mega Drive, PC Engine, Nintendo Entertainment System, Master System
- Release: August 1988: Arcade; EU: August 1988; WW: September 1988 PC Engine; JP: February 23, 1990 Mega Drive; JP: March 3, 1990 NES; EU: March 1991; NA: 1991 Master System; EU: November 12, 1992
- Genre: Platform
- Modes: Single-player, multiplayer

The NewZealand Story (Note: Japanese: ニュージーランドストーリー, Hepburn: Nyū Jīrando Sutōrī) is a 1988 platform video game developed and published by Taito for arcades. The concept and setting were inspired by a holiday trip in New Zealand by one of the Taito programmers. The player controls Tiki, a kiwi who must save his girlfriend and several of his other kiwi chick friends who have been kidnapped by a large blue leopard seal. While avoiding enemies, the player has to navigate a scrolling maze-like level, at the end of which they release one of Tiki's kiwi chick friends trapped in a cage. It was followed by two remakes.

== Gameplay ==
Screenshot from an early level

The goal of each level is to safely get Tiki through the level, avoiding enemies, fire, and spikes (Tiki dies in one hit), and rescue one of his kiwi friends at the end. The weaponry starts out as an endless supply of arrows, but pickups can change these into bombs, lasers or bouncing fireballs. These act a little differently, and what is useful depends upon the player's location. A distinctive feature of this game is the ability to ride a variety of flying vehicles, including balloons, blimps and UFOs. Vehicles can be found ready for use or can be stolen from an enemy.

The levels Tiki has to explore are quite expansive. Instead of single screen levels, they scroll along with the player and extend in all directions, encouraging the player to explore and navigate to find the exit and the many secrets hidden about the maze. On the lower left corner of the screen, there is a mini-map which shows Tiki's position and the location of his caged kiwi friend, which is also the exit of each stage. Often, the vast size of the stages requires that Tiki get some means of transportation, often from enemies, to explore the stage and reach the exit. Though Tiki dies by enemies' weapons and projectiles, he is not harmed by them directly.

The game features four main zones, each with four rounds, the fourth round featuring a boss fight at the end. Other features include the many secret areas and shortcuts hidden throughout the game, accessed using special hidden "warp" portals. On certain later levels, if the player loses their last life due to being killed by a projectile weapon, they will be sent up to a special "Heaven" round. Here, they can either receive a special ending or find the secret route out of Heaven and continue playing the game.

Each stage has an invisible time limit in which the player should take to reach the exit. If the player takes too long to find it, a jingle will play, accompanied by a "Hurry Up!" message. If enough time passes after the warning, an invincible little red devil will appear onscreen to chase down Tiki and kill him instantly if it catches up to him.

The game shares several elements with previous Taito games (such as collecting letters to spell out "EXTEND", from Bubble Bobble).

== Ports ==
Bob Wakelin's artwork for Ocean Software's home conversions

After the release of the original arcade game in 1988, the game was converted to most of the game consoles and home computers of the time. Most home releases came in 1989, with some arriving later through 1990–1992. The home computer versions were published by Ocean Software, and their home computer versions refer to Wally as a walrus on the packaging, but the original arcade version specifically mentions him as being a leopard seal during the closing credits. The NES version was developed by Software Creations and published in the PAL regions by Ocean. In North America the NES version was published by Taito as Kiwi Kraze. The game was included in the Amiga 500 Batman Pack, which was launched in September 1989 and sold over 2 million units. Home conversions generally received good reviews in video game magazines. The game was also converted for the Japanese FM Towns and X68000 systems, providing arcade-perfect conversions, but released exclusively in Japan since both computers were only available there.

The Mega Drive version (again, only released in Japan) had its levels based on the prototype version of the arcade game.

The Taito Legends pack includes an emulated version of the original arcade version of The NewZealand Story, allowing it to be played on the Xbox, PlayStation 2, PlayStation Portable and Windows. In October 2008, the PC Engine version was released for the Wii Virtual Console in Japan.

Tiki the Kiwi also made some cameo appearances in other Taito games such as Liquid Kids, Bubble Symphony and Pop'n Pop.

Hamster Corporation released the arcade version as part of their Arcade Archives series for the Nintendo Switch and PlayStation 4 in January 2023.

== Reception ==
Reception

Review scores
Publication	Score						
Publication	Amiga	Arcade	Atari ST	Master System	NES	Sega Genesis	ZX
ACE	87.5%		87.5%				
Crash							91%
Computer and Video Games		Positive					
Famitsu						6/10, 7/10, 7/10, 4/10	
Sinclair User							82%
The Games Machine (UK)		Positive					
Total!					93%		
Your Sinclair							93%
MegaTech						89%	
New Computer Express	5/5						
Sega Master Force				92%			

Awards
Publication	Award
Crash	Crash Smash
Sinclair User	SU Classic

In Japan, Game Machine listed The NewZealand Story on their November 15, 1988 issue as being the ninth most-successful table arcade unit of the month. In Europe, the arcade game received positive reviews from Computer and Video Games and The Games Machine.

The ZX Spectrum conversion of The NewZealand Story, published by Ocean in 1989, achieved critical success. CRASH awarded 91%, Your Sinclair 93%, and Sinclair User 82%. On the conversion from arcade to an 8-bit platform, Your Sinclair accepted the "disappointing" monochrome display for the sake of smoother play. CRASH commented on the accuracy of the character graphics and animation describing it as "an arcade conversion masterpiece", but found the multi-load cassette version to be awkward. The gameplay was deemed "addictive", with the variety of weapons and modes of transport being particular highlights. By November, The NewZealand Story was number 2 in the Spectrum full-price games chart. The Spectrum version was voted number 34 in the Your Sinclair Readers' Top 100 Games of All Time. The game was ranked the 19th best game of all time by Amiga Power. Mega placed the game at #40 in their Top Mega Drive Games of All Time.

The Nintendo DS remake Revolution received average critical reception. IGN awarded Revolution a "mediocre" score of 5.9, and Eurogamer gave 6/10. While reviews highlighted the challenging and fun retro gameplay, they criticized the touch-stylus and spot-the-difference events as poorly implemented, and the level design sometimes seen as spiteful.

== Legacy ==
In January 2007, Rising Star Games published the Taito-developed Nintendo DS remake titled New Zealand Story Revolution in Australia and in Europe on February 2. In North America, it was published by Ignition Entertainment on February 13. The game was published in Japan by CyberFront as New Zealand Story DS (ニュージーランドストーリーDS) on May 31 of the same year. This version combines the use of both screens for action on the top screen and a map on the bottom screen. During certain instances, the game utilizes the touchscreen, such as opening a door, finding a secret button or flicking Tiki to safety. It also introduces a four-player wireless mode, Normal and Expert game modes, and improved graphics and BGM over the original arcade version. Also, unlike in the original, Tiki can receive multiple hits before losing a life, and can shoot at an angle.

Another remake titled The NewZealand Story: Untold Adventure was developed by Commodore Industries (credited as "bitobit") and released on February 27, 2026 via Steam. Reviews mostly tend to be mixed to negative, noting issues with collision detection, maps not being updated to accommodate for new mechanics, stages missing elements, and hazards blending with background detail.
