= Bubble Bobble Part 2 =

1993 video game

- North American NES box art
- Developers: ITL Co., Ltd. OLM (Note: Game Boy version developed by Taito and OLM)
- Publisher: Taito
- Director: Takashi Shiokawa
- Designers: Yoshihisa Akashi; Tiger Kawano
- Programmer: Kenichi Hiza
- Artists: Hirotogu Ichisumi; Yoshihisa Akashi
- Composer: Kenichi Kamio
- Series: Bubble Bobble
- Platforms: NES, Game Boy
- Release: NES: JP: March 5, 1993; NA: August 1993; Game Boy: JP: May 28, 1993; NA: July 1993
- Genre: Platform
- Modes: Single-player, multiplayer (NES only)

Bubble Bobble Part 2, known in Japan as Bubble Bobble 2 (バブルボブル2), is a platform video game released by Taito in 1993 for the Nintendo Entertainment System and Game Boy. It is the fourth installment in the Bubble Bobble series, itself a sequel to the 1986 arcade game Bubble Bobble. While it was never released in the arcades, two versions of the game were developed independently from each other (for the NES and Game Boy systems). Both games received a different storyline as a result. The Game Boy version is known in Japan as Bubble Bobble Junior (バブルボブルジュニア).

== Plot ==
NES gameplay screenshot

=== NES version ===
According to the NES version's manual, this game stars Bub and Bob, the original duo. On the back cover, they are also said to be Cubby and Rubby, Bub and Bob's descendants.

As seen in the game intro, Bub, and a girl named Judy, were sitting in a park. Suddenly, a floating skull character, who is one of the Skull Brothers, captures Judy inside a bubble, and sends her and Bub into the air. Two characters named Drunk (from the original Bubble Bobble) follow the skull and take Judy away. Bub turns (or is turned) into a bubble dragon and heads off to rescue his girlfriend. There is also a two-player mode, implying that Bob has suffered from the same events as Bub had, but the manual says Judy is a friend of both.

=== Game Boy version ===
In the Game Boy version, a character named Robby must rescue people from a village, who, according to this version's intro, have been captured by a skull character.

== Gameplay ==
The blank backgrounds of Bubble Bobble were replaced by background graphics like trees and the sky. The backgrounds change every ten levels, possibly inspired by contemporary platform games such as Snow Bros. and Joe & Mac 2: Lost in the Tropics. Some reviewers say this helps to keep the game feeling fresh during longer sessions.

For both the NES and Game Boy versions, the gameplay remains largely unchanged from the other games in the series, but the player has the ability to float upwards by holding down the B button.

=== NES version ===
In the NES version only, there are three bonus games which are located after the player defeats a boss, or through a certain door. This version also includes new items to pick up, such as clocks, which cause enemies to freeze, and bottles of wind, which create wind bubbles. The dragons can also blow Super Bubbles, which can trap multiple enemies.

=== Game Boy version ===
In the Game Boy release, unlike the original Bubble Bobble and many other games in the series, the 2-player mode has players take turns across levels, rather than cooperatively play through them simultaneously.

== Reception ==
Reception

Review score
Publication	Score
Power Unlimited	75/100(Game Boy)

Power Unlimited gave the Game Boy version a score of 75%, writing: "This kind of mind sport is ideal for the Game Boy. It can seem a bit simple at times, and sometimes gets a bit boring, but you have to use your head if you want to get through it. A fun game if you persevere".

The NES version can be difficult to find on the secondhand market due to the low volume of production.
