= Rainbow Islands =

1987 video game

Rainbow Islands: The Story of Bubble Bobble 2
- Japanese arcade flyer
- Developer: Taito
- Publisher: Taito
- Designer: Fukio Mitsuji
- Composer: Hisayoshi Ogura
- Series: Rainbow Islands
- Platform: Arcade: NES, ZX Spectrum, Amiga, Atari ST, Mega Drive, Amstrad CPC, Commodore 64, FM Towns, Master System, PC Engine CD-ROM², Sega Saturn, PlayStation, WonderSwan, Game Boy Color
- Release: October 1987: Arcade; JP: October 1987 NES; JP: July 26, 1988; NA: June 1991; PAL: 1991 ZX Spectrum; UK: February 1989 Amiga, Atari ST; EU: September 1989 Mega Drive; JP: October 5, 1990 C64, CPC; EU: 1990 Master System; PAL: 1993 CD-ROM²; JP: June 30, 1993 Saturn; NA: September 3, 1996; PAL: September 1996 PlayStation; NA: September 6, 1996; PAL: June 20, 1997 WonderSwan; JP: June 29, 2000 Game Boy Color; EU: 2001
- Genre: Platform
- Modes: Single-player, multiplayer

Rainbow Islands: The Story of Bubble Bobble 2 (Note: Japanese: レインボーアイランド, Hepburn: Reinbō Airando), better known as simply Rainbow Islands, is a 1987 platform video game developed and published by Taito for Japanese arcades. It is the sequel to 1986's Bubble Bobble, and the second of four arcade games in the Bubble Bobble series (followed by Bubble Symphony and Bubble Memories, but itself has two direct sequels: Parasol Stars and Bubble Bobble Part 2). The game was ported to home computers and home video game consoles.

== Gameplay ==
The second stage (arcade version)

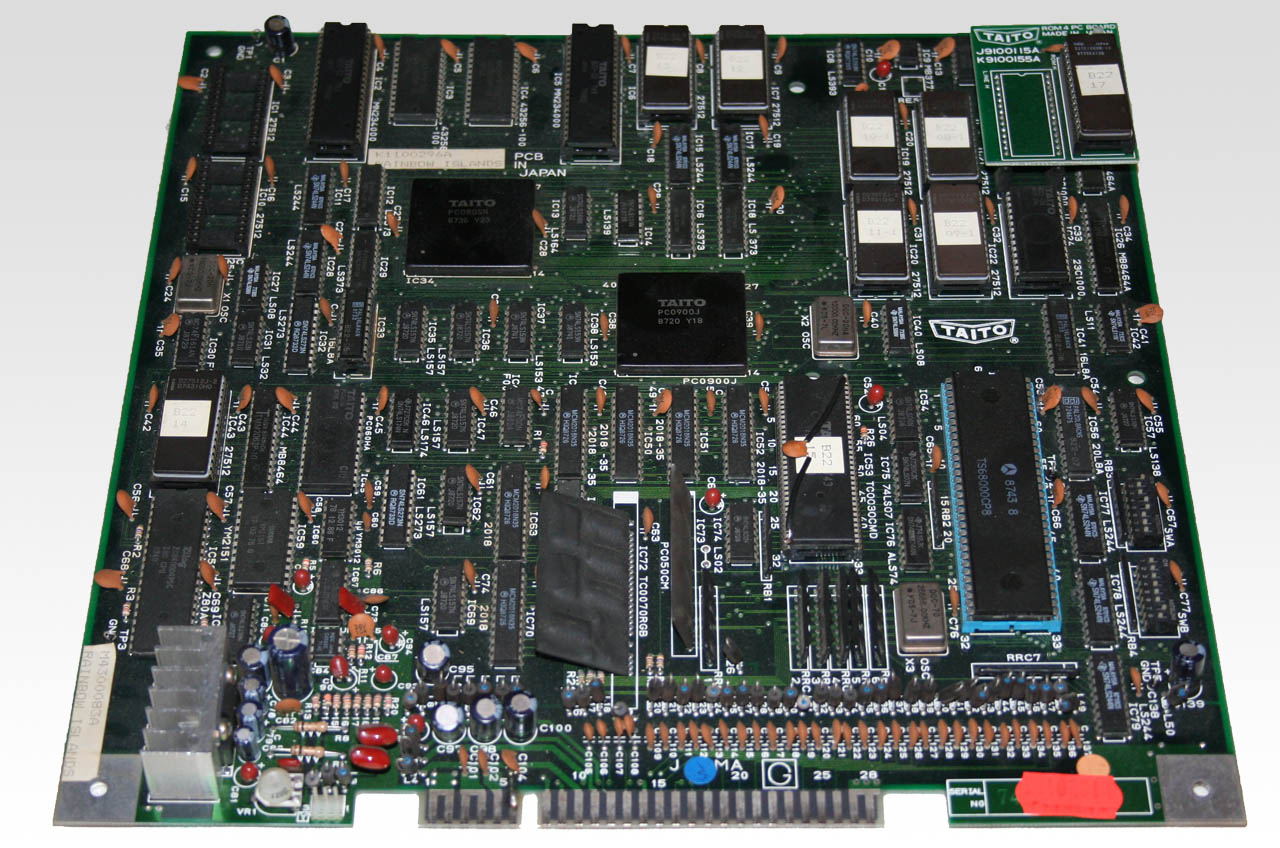
Arcade PCB (Taito B22)

Following the events of Bubble Bobble, Bubby and Bobby set out to defeat the "Dark Shadow" and rescue the Rainbow Islands. The Dark Shadow is the entity responsible for the events in Bubble Bobble. The game is set on a chain of ten islands, each one with a different theme. Each island provides four rounds of game-play, and once these are complete the player moves to the next island in the chain. In each round the player must get to the top before the sea level rises and kills them. The islands get progressively more difficult, with enemies moving much faster on the later ones. These are depicted on a map screen before the start of each island.

Players can release rainbows that act as weapons, makeshift platforms, and item collectors. Slinging rainbows damages any enemies and acquires any items that the rainbows come in contact with. When jumped upon, they fall down, beating any enemies below them, and releasing a damage field above them. Collecting power-ups increases the player's speed, the speed of the rainbows and how many are spawned. If players take too long in a level, water will start to rise up from the bottom of the stage, and will kill the player character if it rises above his head.

Like its predecessor, the game has multiple endings. To get a big diamond, the player must collect seven different-colored small diamonds on the island and finish the round. The small diamonds are found by destroying enemies by dropping a rainbow on them from above or destroying them with various special items. After collecting the small diamonds, a word "NICE" appears. If the small diamonds are collected in the correct order, the player will get to a secret room at the end of each island, which contains a permanent power up. The color of the small diamonds depends on where the fallen enemies land, so the player can somewhat determine which diamond colors will drop.

The scoring system also has secrets, which allow vastly higher scores to be achieved than normal.

== Ports ==
Graftgold developed ports for the Commodore 64, ZX Spectrum, Amstrad CPC, Amiga and Atari ST, which were released by Ocean Software in 1989 and 1990. The company would also develop ports for the MS-DOS, Sega Saturn and PlayStation, which were released by Acclaim Entertainment in 1996.

The game was released outside Japan for the first time for the Nintendo Entertainment System in 1988; the main theme was replaced with an original track, due to its similarity to "Over the Rainbow" from Metro-Goldwyn-Mayer's 1939 film The Wizard of Oz, which would have attracted legal troubles from Turner Entertainment Co. if the arcade version was ever released outside Japan. It also includes an island based on KiKi Kaikai as a replacement for Magical Island. The Master System version, released by Sega, as well as the Game Boy Color version, are direct ports of this version. The European version of the NES port was localized by Ocean to be more faithful to the arcade version, whereas the Japanese and North American versions have original level designs and story intermissions. A TurboGrafx-16 version was released in 1993 by NEC Avenue. A WonderSwan version was released in 2000 by Bandai.

Rainbow Islands Extra Version is a modified version of Rainbow Islands; the layouts of the islands remain exactly the same except the stages' enemies and bosses appear in a different order (much like Bubble Bobble's Super Mode). In addition, the bosses were made more difficult by adding more variety to their behavior. Rainbow Islands Extra was released in limited quantities in the arcade. The game was also included as a mode in the Mega Drive version of Rainbow Islands. The game was also included in the Japanese compilation Taito Memories II Jōkan for the PlayStation 2 and the PlayStation Portable collection Taito Memories Pocket.

Hamster Corporation released the original arcade version outside Japan for the first time as part of their Arcade Archives series for the Nintendo Switch and PlayStation 4 in January 2024. This version had its main theme replaced with the NES main theme due to the same legal issues with Warner Bros. Pictures, the successor company to Turner Entertainment.

== Reception ==
Reception

Review scores
Publication	Score
Crash	Spectrum: 94%
Computer and Video Games	Atari ST: 93% Amiga: 96% C64: 96% Spectrum: 95%
Famitsu	5/10, 7/10, 8/10, 5/10 (SMD)
Sinclair User	Spectrum: 94
Your Sinclair	Spectrum: 94°
ACE	Atari ST: 934
Zzap!64	C64: 96%
MicroHobby (ES)	Spectrum: 89%
The Games Machine	Amiga: 93% C64: 92%
MegaTech	Mega Drive: 86%
Mean Machines	Mega Drive: 92%
Sega Master Force	91%
Sega Saturn Magazine	Saturn: 92%

Awards
Publication	Award
Zzap!64	Gold Medal
Crash	Crash Smash
Sinclair User	SU Classic

In Japan, Game Machine listed Rainbow Island: The Story of Bubble Bobble 2 as the second most successful table arcade unit of November 1987. It went on to become one of the top ten highest-grossing arcade games of 1988 in Japan. The Spectrum version of the game was number one on the UK sales chart from May to June 1990 at the time of release. It was re-released at a budget price, and was number one again from October 1992 to March 1993. It was also the top-selling Amiga budget title of March 1992.

UK magazine C&VG gave the ST version a score of 93%, praising the graphics and calling the game addictive and "tremendous fun". It was awarded 94% in the April 1990 issue of Your Sinclair and was placed at number 8 in the "Your Sinclair official top 100". In issue 93 of the same magazine, the readers voted it the second best game of all time. It was also awarded a 94% score in Crash. The readers of Crash voted Rainbow Islands the number one game of all time in December 1991. MegaTech magazine said it was "virtually arcade perfect, with only flickery sprites letting the side down".

Edge wrote in 1994 that "Taito's Rainbow Islands has all the ingredients for a superb videogame – incentives, copious rewards and bonuses, and intelligent bosses".

Despite these accomplishments, in his review of the Bubble Bobble Featuring Rainbow Islands pack, Rich Leadbetter of Sega Saturn Magazine said Rainbow Islands was "vastly underrated and over-looked". He added that the gameplay still felt fresh and unique despite the passage of years, and was good enough to make the collection a must-have by itself.

=== Accolades ===
The Amiga version of Rainbow Islands was the first game to reach number one on Amiga Power's annual All Time Top 100 list in 1991, and again in 1992. It held the spot for years until losing to Sensible Soccer, which retained the title for the rest of the magazine's run. In 1992, Mega magazine ranked the Mega Drive version ninth on its "Mega Top 100 Carts" list. In 1993, Commodore Force ranked the game at number five on its list of the top 100 Commodore 64 games. In 1996, GamesMaster ranked the game 79th on its list of the "Top 100 Games of All Time".
