= Bubble Memories =

1996 video game

Bubble Memories: The Story of Bubble Bobble III
- Japanese arcade flyer
- Developer: Taito
- Publisher: Taito
- Designer: Takahiro Fujito
- Programmers: Harumi Kasuga; Takafumi Kaneko
- Artists: Uoosy Marler; Akiyoshi Takada; Mari Fukusaki; Miwa Kamiya; Takaaki Furukawa; Makoto Fujita
- Composer: Yasuko Yamada
- Series: Bubble Bobble
- Platform: Arcade
- Release: JP: February 7, 1996 (Ver 2.3); EU: February 15, 1996
- Genre: Platform
- Modes: Single-player, multiplayer
- Arcade system: Taito F3 System

Bubble Memories: The Story of Bubble Bobble III (バブルメモリーズ) is a platform video game by Taito released to arcades in February 1996. It is the sequel to Bubble Symphony and is the fifth Bubble Bobble game (although it is listed as being the third). Unlike Bubble Symphony, this game stars only two dragons, Bub and Bob, like the original Bubble Bobble. It was released in 2007 for PlayStation 2 in Japan only as part of the Taito Memories II Volume 1 compilation.

== Plot ==
Unlike other Bubble Bobble games, players may create large bubbles that can capture several enemies at once.

One day, the twins Bubby and Bobby, intermarried with Bub and Bob, playing together to the tower where they live, are transformed into bubble-blowing dragons by the evil Dark Super Great Dragon that takes possession of the tower. The twins must climb the 80 floors of the tower to take seven colorful potions, free it from his clutches and regain their human forms.

Bub and Bob are young boys in the intro, indicating that this is a prequel to the series.

== Gameplay ==
Bub and Bob are once again transformed into bubble dragons and have to climb up the Rainbow Tower to fight the Super Dark Great Dragon, while collecting potions to turn back into human form.

Bubble Memories: The Story of Bubble Bobble III does very little to change the gameplay of the series, except for introducing giant enemies on some levels, different bosses, and a way to blow giant bubbles after charging up (especially for killing the giant enemies). Giant bubbles can be blown by charging up the character, the bubble button is held until the character's horns begin flashing and then releasing the button. There are a total of 80 levels, while the last 10 levels can only be accessed by collecting 7 potions. The potions are located in invisible tiles on every fifth level, and missing any of the 7 potions will lead to the bad end at level 70, where the players' dragons are turned into monsters. If all 7 potions are gathered at level 70, the players continue on to fight the final boss. Reviewers indicate that later levels introduce puzzle elements, requiring players to use their bubbles in new ways to proceed.

== Reception ==
In Japan, Game Machine listed Bubble Memories on their May 15, 1996 issue as being the twenty-first most-successful arcade game of the month.
