= Liquid Kids =

1990 video game

- Japanese arcade flyer
- Developer: Taito (Note: Saturn version developed by Ving.)
- Publisher: Taito (Note: Saturn version published by Ving.)
- Director: Toshiaki Matsumoto
- Producer: Kazutomo Ishida
- Designer: Nobuhiro Hiramatsu
- Programmers: Kazutomo Ishida; Koji Tsunekiyo; Kusago Nagahara
- Artists: Hiroyo Kujirai; Nobuhiro Hiramatsu; Yoshihiro Iwata
- Composer: Kazuko Umino
- Platforms: Arcade, PC Engine, Sega Saturn
- Release: Arcade: JP: August 1990; Saturn: JP: October 22, 1998
- Genre: Platform
- Modes: Single-player, multiplayer
- Arcade system: Taito F2 System

Liquid Kids (Note: Also known as Mizubaku Adventure (Japanese: ミズバク大冒険(アドベンチャー), Hepburn: Mizubaku Adobenchā) in Japan.) is a 1990 platform video game developed and published by Taito for arcades. It was only released in Japan in August 1990. The game was ported to the PC Engine and Sega Saturn. Home computer versions were in development but none were officially released to the public. A home port of Liquid Kids for the Sega Saturn was released in 1998, followed by an Arcade Archives release in 2021 for PlayStation 4 and Nintendo Switch.

Liquid Kids enjoyed success in arcades among players, garnering positive reception from critics, while its home conversions were also met with similarly positive response from gaming magazines who reviewed it as an import title.

== Gameplay ==
Arcade version screenshot

Liquid Kids is a platform game where players assume the role of Hipopo, a hippopotamus who fights his way across various stages set in the land of Woody-Lake against enemies led by Fire Demon in search of his missing girlfriend Tamasun while rescuing other hippos along the way. Hipopo is armed with water bombs that can be thrown at enemies to soak and damage them. Once soaked, enemies can be kicked and destroyed completely. Undefeated enemies will dry out and recover after a short time period. Small plants also appear on certain levels which can be "watered", causing them to grow and creating new platforms. He can also collect cakes and other items to gain more points. Getting hit by enemies results in losing a life, as well as a penalty of lowering Hipopo's status to his original state. There is also an invisible time limit. If the player takes too long to complete the stage, a jingle will play along with "Hurry Up!" music and the screen will get dimmer, along with the little demon from the Hipopo and Tamasun cutscenes chasing the player until he catches them. The game is over once all lives are lost, unless players insert more credits into the arcade machine to continue playing.

== Release ==
Liquid Kids was first released in arcades by Taito in August 1990, using the Taito F2 System board. The soundtrack was composed by Kazuko "Karu" Umino. On January 21, 1991, an album containing music from the game and Space Gun was co-published exclusively in Japan by Scitron and Pony Canyon. The title was first ported to the PC Engine by Taito and released exclusively in Japan on January 17, 1992. It is a faithful conversion that retains most of the gameplay elements from the arcade original but a number of graphical effects were removed such as the time transitions and parallax scrolling. This version would later be re-released for the Wii's Virtual Console in 2008. An Amiga port was completed by Ocean France, but not released by Ocean Software. Likewise, an Atari ST version was also in development but never released by Ocean for unknown reasons. A near-arcade perfect port was developed and published by Ving for the Sega Saturn on October 22, 1998. It was also included in the Taito Legends 2 (Taito Memories 2 in Japan) for the Xbox, PlayStation 2 and Microsoft Windows in 2006. Hamster Corporation released the game as part of the Arcade Archives series for the Nintendo Switch and PlayStation 4 in December 2021. The original arcade version was included as part of the Taito Egret II Mini dedicated console in 2022.

== Reception ==
Reception

Review scores
| Publication | Score |
|---|---|
| Famitsu | (PCE) 24/40 |
| Consoles + | (PCE) 85% |
| Gekkan PC Engine | (PCE) 80/100 |
| Génération 4 | (PCE) 92% |
| Joypad | (PCE) 93% |
| Joystick | (PCE) 91% |
| Marukatsu PC Engine | (PCE) 29/40 |
| PC Engine Fan | (PCE) 21.91/30 |
| Player One | (PCE) 88% |
| Sega Saturn Magazine (JP) | (Saturn) 6.0/10 |
| Sinclair User | (Arcade) 81/100 |
| Your Sinclair | (Arcade) 90°/100° |
| Zero | (Arcade) 4/5 |

In Japan, Game Machine listed Liquid Kids on their November 15, 1990 issue as being the seventeenth most-successful table arcade unit of the month, outperforming titles such as Parodius! From Myth to Laughter and Magic Sword. The arcade original was also met with positive reception from critics since its initial release. The PC Engine conversion was met with positive reception from critics.

== Legacy ==
Hipopo makes cameo appearances in Arkanoid vs. Space Invaders.
