= Bubble Bobble (video game) =

1986 video game

- Japanese arcade flyer
- Developer: Taito
- Publishers: JP: Taito; NA: Romstar; EU: Electrocoin
- Designer: Fukio Mitsuji
- Composer: Tadashi Kimijima
- Series: Bubble Bobble
- Platform: Arcade: Famicom Disk System, Amiga, Amstrad CPC, Atari ST, Commodore 64, ZX Spectrum, MSX 2, Master System, NES, Apple II, MS-DOS, X68000, Game Boy, Game Gear, Sega Saturn, PlayStation, Game Boy Color, iOS, Android
- Release: September 1986: Arcade; JP: September 1986; NA/EU: October 1986 Famicom Disk System; JP: October 30, 1987 Amiga, Atari ST; EU: October 1987; NA: May 1989 C64; EU: October 1987; NA: July 1988 CPC; EU: October 1987 ZX Spectrum; UK: October 1987 Master System; JP: July 2, 1988; EU: November 1991 NES; NA: November 1988; PAL: October 26, 1990 Apple II; July 1989 MS-DOS; December 1989 X68000; JP: March 9, 1990 Game Boy; JP: December 7, 1990; NA: March 1991 Game Gear; NA: November 1994 Saturn; NA: September 3, 1996; PAL: September 1996 PlayStation; NA: September 6, 1996; PAL: June 20, 1997 Game Boy Color; NA: November 30, 1999; EU: 2000 iOS, Android; WW: July 2020
- Genre: Platform
- Modes: Single-player, multiplayer
- Arcade system: Taito Bubble Bobble

Bubble Bobble (Note: Japanese: バブルボブル, Hepburn: Baburu Boburu) is a 1986 platform video game developed and published by Taito for arcades. It was released in North America by Romstar and in Europe by Electrocoin. Players control Bub and Bob, two dragons who set out to save their girlfriends from a world called the Cave of Monsters. In each level, Bub and Bob must defeat every enemy present by trapping them in bubbles and popping them. The enemies will then turn into bonus items when they hit the ground. There are 100 levels total, each becoming progressively more difficult.

Bubble Bobble was designed by Fukio "MTJ" Mitsuji. When he joined Taito in 1986, he felt that Taito's game output was of mediocre quality. In response, he decided to make a game that was fun to play and could rejuvenate the company's presence in the industry. Mitsuji hoped his game would appeal to women, specifically couples that visited arcades. As such, he decided to make Bubble Bobble focus largely on its two player co-operative mode. He made bubbles the core mechanic as he thought they would be a fun element that girls would enjoy.

Bubble Bobble became one of Taito's biggest arcade successes, and is credited with inspiring the creation of many similar screen-clear platform games that followed. It was acclaimed by critics for its character design, memorable soundtrack, gameplay, and multiplayer, and is often listed among the greatest games of all time. Bubble Bobble was followed by a long list of sequels and successors for multiple platforms. One of these, Puzzle Bobble, also became successful and spawned its own line of sequels.

== Plot ==
Brothers Bub and Bob are two happy go lucky dragons [sic] living in a magical forest. "Baron Von Blubba" has kidnapped the brothers' girlfriends. Bub and Bob must finish 100 levels in the Cave of Monsters in order to rescue them. At the end of the game after fighting Super Drunk on level 100 in cooperative mode, it is revealed Bub, Bob, and their girlfriends are humans transformed by magic and that Bub and Bob's parents were kidnapped as well.

== Gameplay ==
Bub (player 1) is in the upper left of this arcade level.

In the game, each player controls one of the two dragons. Players can move along platforms, fall to lower ones, and jump to higher ones and over gaps. Each level is limited to a single screen, with no left/right scrolling. However, if a screen has gaps in its bottom edge, players can fall through these and reappear at the top. Each level has a certain number of enemies that must be defeated in order to advance. The players must blow bubbles to trap the enemies and then burst these bubbles by colliding with them. Magic items appear from time to time and grant special abilities and advantages when picked up. Special bubbles occasionally appear that can be burst to attack enemies with fire, water, or lightning. Each defeated enemy turns into a food item that can be picked up for extra points. Defeating multiple enemies at once awards higher scores and causes more valuable food items to appear. Furthermore, if a player collects letter bubbles to spell the word EXTEND, a bonus life is earned and both players immediately advance to the next level. All bubbles will float for a certain length of time before bursting on their own. Players can jump on these and ride them to otherwise inaccessible areas to reach enemies and/or powerups.

A player loses one life upon touching any free enemy or their projectiles (rocks, fireballs, lasers, bottles). Enemies become "angry"—turning pink in color and moving faster—if they escape from a bubble after being left too long or the players spend a certain amount of time on the current level. They return to normal if either player loses a life. After a further time limit expires, an additional invincible enemy appears for each player, actively chasing them using only vertical and horizontal movements. These disappear once the level is cleared, or when a player loses a life. When there is only one enemy left, it immediately becomes angry and remains in this state until it is defeated.

In the 100th and final level, players face a boss. This is one of the first games to feature multiple endings. Completing Level 100 in single-player mode reveals a message stating that the game has not truly ended and also displays a hint: "Come here with your friend". If two players complete the game, they see a "happy end", in which the brothers are transformed to their human selves and reunited with their girlfriends. This ending also includes a code that, when deciphered, allows the game to be played in the faster and more difficult "super" mode. If this mode is completed with two players, a second "happy end" is displayed in which Super Drunk (the defeated boss) is revealed to be the brothers' parents under the control of some outside influence. The brothers return to normal and are reunited with their parents and girlfriends.

If the player(s) reach levels 20, 30, or 40 without losing a life, a doorway will appear in each of those levels. This doorway transports the player to a secret room and displays a coded message that, once deciphered, provides a major hint/spoiler on how to beat the game. If level 50 is reached without at least one player losing a life, a warp will appear that transports the player to level 70.

== Development and release ==
Bubble Bobble was designed by Fukio Mitsuji, a Japanese game designer at Taito. A fan of arcade games by Namco, specifically Xevious, Mitsuji felt that Taito's output in comparison was lackluster and of poor quality. Mitsuji hoped that he could help push the company to produce higher-quality arcade titles. His first game was the four-screen racer Super Dead Heat in 1985, followed by the shoot 'em up Halley's Comet the same year. After work on these two games was completed, Mitsuji decided to make his next project a platform game, featuring cute characters and a more comical setting compared to his previous titles.

Mitsuji wanted the game to be exhilarating and to appeal towards a female audience. Thinking about what kind of things women like to draw or sketch, Mitsuji created an extensive list of over 100 ideas, and after a process of elimination, selected bubbles as the core game mechanic. He liked the idea of the screen being filled with bubbles, and thought that popping them all at once would provide a thrilling sensation to the player. His initial idea was to have a robot with a spike on its head to pop bubbles. Mitsuji disliked this idea for not being "cool", instead preferring dinosaurs with ridges along their back. He liked to write down ideas on paper as soon as he thought of them, often flooding his office with stacks of paper filled with potential ideas for game mechanics.

Mitsuji constantly tried to think of new ways to make the game better than it was before, even losing sleep while attempting to figure out how he could improve it. He often worked on holidays and late at night to come up with new ideas for the game and to perfect it. Several of the enemies were taken from Chack'n Pop (1984), an older Taito game that is often considered a precursor to Bubble Bobble. Mitsuji intended the game to be played by couples, leading to the creation of the multiple endings, which differ based on player performance.

Bubble Bobble was first released in Japan on June 16, 1986, followed by a wide release in Japan in September and internationally in October of the same year. Alongside Arkanoid, Taito licensed the game to Romstar for distribution in the United States, and to Electrocoin Automatics for Europe.

== Ports ==
Bubble Bobble was ported to many home video game consoles and computers, including the Amstrad CPC, ZX Spectrum, Commodore 64, MS-DOS, Apple II, Amiga, Famicom Disk System, Nintendo Entertainment System, MSX2, and Master System; the Master System version has two hundred levels as opposed to the arcade version's 100 levels, and was released in Japan as Final Bubble Bobble. A version for the X68000 was developed by Dempa and released in 1990, which includes a game mode paying homage to Mitsuji's later arcade game Syvalion, titled Sybubblun. Versions for the Game Boy and Game Boy Color were respectively released in 1990 and 1999, with the latter port being renamed Classic Bubble Bobble. These versions of the game only include a single-player mode, and have a different plot where Bob has fallen ill and Bub must find the Moon Water to help his sick brother. A version of Bubble Bobble was also produced for the unreleased Taito WOWOW console. In 1996, Taito announced that the source code for Bubble Bobble had been lost, leading to all subsequent home conversions to be reverse-engineered from an original arcade board.

== Reception ==
Reception

Review scores
Publication	Score				
Publication	Arcade	C64	Game Gear	NES	ZX
AllGame				4.5/5	
Crash	Positive				90%
Computer and Video Games	Positive	27/30			
Electronic Gaming Monthly			31/40		
Sinclair User					8/10
The Games Machine (UK)		93%			
Your Sinclair					90%
Zzap!64		97%			

Awards
Publication	Award
Zzap!64	Gold Medal
Crash	Smash

In Japan, Game Machine listed Bubble Bobble as the second most successful table arcade cabinet of October 1986, behind Taito's own Arkanoid. It went on to be the fifth highest-grossing table arcade game of 1987 in Japan. In the United Kingdom, Bubble Bobble was the top-grossing arcade game from April to June 1987. The home conversions were also successful in the UK, where the game appeared on the sales charts for several years. The ZX Spectrum budget re-release topped the UK charts in July 1991.

The arcade version received positive reviews from Computer and Video Games and Crash. Mean Machines gave the Game Boy port of the game a score of 91%, noting that, while some changes had been made, the game played identical to the original arcade port and "provides much addiction and challenge". The four reviewers of Electronic Gaming Monthly stated that the Game Gear version is a faithful conversion of the original which works well in portable form. They particularly praised the simplicity of the gameplay concept and the graphics, and the two-player link option.

Bubble Bobble has been listed by numerous publications among the greatest video games of all time. Your Sinclair magazine ranked the ZX Spectrum version at #58 in their "Top 100 Games of All Time" in 1993 based on reader vote. In 1996, GamesMaster rated the game 19th on its "Top 100 Games of All Time". Yahoo! ranked it at #71 in their "100 Greatest Computer Games Of All Time" in 2005 for its charming premise and cute character designs. Stuff magazine listed it as part of their "100 Greatest Games" in 2008, while GamesTM magazine listed it in their "Top 100 Games" in 2010. Stuff.tv ranked it at #47 in their Top 100 Games in 2009, saying "Today's kids might laugh, but this was gold in 1986". GamesRadar+ ranked it at #95 in their "100 Best Games Of All Time" list in 2011, praising its multiplayer and secrets. GamesRadar+ also labeled it the 24th greatest Nintendo Entertainment System game of all time in 2012 for its advancements over other games of its genre and its usage of multiple endings. IGN named it the 23rd best NES game. Hardcore Gaming 101 listed it in their book The 200 Best Video Games of All Time in 2015. Game Informer placed it in their "Top 300 Games of All Time" in 2018 for its long-lasting appeal and multiplayer.

== Legacy ==
=== Re-releases ===
The game has had at least 30 official ports to a large array of computers and consoles throughout the decades.

A remastered version named Bubble Bobble Old & New was made for Game Boy Advance, which also included the original arcade version. It was released in Japan by MediaKite and internationally by Empire Interactive.

In October 2005, a version was released for the Xbox, PlayStation 2, and Microsoft Windows as part of the Taito Legends compilation.

In December 2007, the NES version of Bubble Bobble was released in North America on Nintendo's Virtual Console service for the Wii. The Famicom Disk System version of Bubble Bobble was also released for the Nintendo eShop on October 16, 2013, for the Nintendo 3DS and on January 29, 2014, for the Wii U.

Hamster Corporation released the game as part of their Arcade Archives series for the PlayStation 4 in 2016 and Nintendo Switch in 2022, as well the NES version as part of their Console Archives series for the Nintendo Switch 2 and PlayStation 5 in August 2026.

The game was included in the NES Classic Edition in November 2016.
