= Puzzle Bobble =

1994 video game

- Arcade flyer
- Developer: Taito (Note: Ported to 3DO by MicroCabin, to Game Gear by Santos, to Windows by Kinesoft, and to WonderSwan by Yoshidayama Workshop)
- Publishers: Taito: Neo Geo, Neo Geo CD SNK 3DO; JP: MicroCabin; NA: Panasonic Windows; JP: GameBank; EU: GT Interactive; NA: Interplay Productions WonderSwan Sunsoft
- Designers: Kazuhiro Kinoshita; Seiichi Nakakuki
- Programmer: Yasuo Tsumori
- Composers: Kazuko Umino; Yasuko Yamada
- Series: Puzzle Bobble
- Platforms: Arcade, Super NES, 3DO, Game Gear, Windows, Neo Geo CD, WonderSwan, PlayStation Portable
- Release: June 1994: Arcade; JP: June 1994; NA: December 1994 Super NES; JP: January 13, 1995; NA: March 1995; EU: June 29, 1995 Neo Geo CD; NA: April 27, 1995; JP: May 2, 1995 3DO; JP: 22 November 1995; NA: December 15, 1995 Game Gear; JP: August 2, 1996; NA: 1996 WonderSwan; JP: July 1, 1999
- Genre: Puzzle
- Modes: Single-player, multiplayer
- Arcade system: Taito B System (Japan), Neo Geo MVS (international)

Puzzle Bobble, (Note: Japanese: パズルボブル, Hepburn: Pazuru Boburu) released internationally as Bust-A-Move, is a 1994 tile-matching puzzle video game developed and published by Taito for arcades. It is a spin-off of the 1986 arcade game Bubble Bobble, featuring characters and themes from that game. Its characteristically cute Japanese animation and music, along with its play mechanics and level designs, made it successful as an arcade title and spawned several sequels and ports to home systems.

== Gameplay ==
Arcade version screenshot

At the start of each round, the rectangular playing arena contains a prearranged pattern of colored "bubbles". At the bottom of the screen, the player controls a device called a "pointer", which aims and fires bubbles up the screen. The color of bubbles fired is randomly generated and chosen from the colors of bubbles still left on the screen.

The objective of the game is to clear all the bubbles from the arena without any bubble crossing the bottom line. Bubbles will fire automatically if the player remains idle. After clearing the arena, the next round begins with a new pattern of bubbles to clear. The arcade version of the game consists of 30 levels. The fired bubbles travel in straight lines (possibly bouncing off the sidewalls of the arena), stopping when they touch other bubbles or reach the top of the arena. If a bubble touches identically colored bubbles, forming a group of three or more, those bubbles—as well as any bubbles hanging from them—are removed from the field of play, and points are awarded. After every few shots, the "ceiling" of the playing arena drops downwards slightly, along with all the bubbles stuck to it. The number of shots between each drop of the ceiling is influenced by the number of bubble colors remaining. The closer the bubbles get to the bottom of the screen, the faster the music plays and if they cross the line at the bottom then the game is over.

== Release ==
Two different versions of the original game were released. Puzzle Bobble was originally released in Japan in June 1994 by Taito, running on Taito B System hardware (with the preliminary title Bubble Buster). On December 21, 1994, it was released on SNK's Neo Geo MVS arcade system in Japan and North America; this version is almost identical aside from being in stereo and having some different sound effects and translated text.

Hamster Corporation re-released the game as part of their ACA Neo Geo series for the PlayStation 4, Xbox One, Nintendo Switch and Windows.

== Reception ==
Reception

Review scores
Publication	Score
AllGame	3.5/5 (Arcade)
Electronic Gaming Monthly	39/50 (SNES)
Next Generation	4/5 (SNES); 4/5 (3DO)
Super Play	84% (SNES)

In Japan, Game Machine listed the Neo Geo version of Puzzle Bobble as the second most popular arcade game of February 1995. It went on to become Japan's second highest-grossing arcade printed circuit board (PCB) software of 1995, below Virtua Fighter 2. In North America, RePlay reported the Neo Geo version of Puzzle Bobble to be the fourth most popular arcade game of February 1995.

Reviewing the Super NES version, Mike Weigand of Electronic Gaming Monthly called it "a thoroughly enjoyable and incredibly addicting puzzle game". He considered the two player mode the highlight, but also said that the one player mode provides a solid challenge. GamePro gave it a generally negative review, saying it starts out fun but that ultimately lacks intricacy and longevity. They elaborated that in one player mode all the levels feel the same, and that two player matches are over too quickly to build up any excitement. They also criticized the lack of any 3D effects in the graphics. Next Generation reviewed the SNES version of the game and called it "addictive as hell".

A reviewer for Next Generation, while questioning the continued viability of the action puzzle genre, admitted that the game is "very simple and very addictive". He remarked that though the 3DO version makes no significant additions, none are called for by a game with such simple enjoyment. GamePro's brief review of the 3DO version commented that the game's controls are responsive, and they also praised visuals and music. Edge magazine ranked the game 73rd on their 100 Best Video Games in 2007. IGN rated the SNES version 54th in its Top 100 SNES Games.

== Legacy ==
The simplicity of the concept has led to many clones, both commercial and otherwise. 1996's Snood replaced the bubbles with small creatures and has been successful in its own right. Worms Blast was Team 17's take on the concept. On September 24, 2000, British game publisher Empire Interactive released a similar game, Spin Jam, for the original PlayStation console. Mobile clones include Bubble Witch Saga and Bubble Shooter. Frozen Bubble is a free software clone. For Bubble Bobble's 35th anniversary, Taito launched Puzzle Bobble VR: Vacation Odyssey on the Oculus Quest and Oculus Quest 2, later coming to PlayStation 4 and PlayStation 5 as Puzzle Bobble 3D: Vacation Odyssey in 2021.

=== Puzzle Bobble Everybubble! ===
Puzzle Bobble Everybubble! was released on May 23, 2023, for Nintendo Switch. The game also comes with an extra mode called "Puzzle Bobble vs. Space Invaders", where up to four players can work together to erase bubble-encased invaders before they reach the player while only being able to aim straight up.
