= Darius Cozmic Collection =

2019 video game

- Developer: M2
- Publishers: JP: Taito; WW: ININ Games
- Series: Darius
- Platforms: Nintendo Switch, PlayStation 4, Windows
- Release: Nintendo Switch: JP: February 28, 2019; WW: June 16, 2020; PlayStation 4: JP: March 5, 2020; WW: June 16, 2020; Windows: WW: November 17, 2021 (Arcade)
- Genre: Scrolling shooter
- Modes: Single-player, multiplayer

Darius Cozmic Collection (Note: Japanese: ダライアス コズミックコレクション, Hepburn: Daraiasu Kozumikku Korekushon) is a compilation of Darius scrolling shooter titles. It was released in Japan for the Nintendo Switch on February 28, 2019, and on PlayStation 4 on March 5, 2020. A worldwide release on both platforms followed on June 16, 2020. The Arcade arc of the collection was released in 2021 on Steam.

== Editions ==
There are six editions of Darius Cozmic Collection:

Japanese releases

- Standard Edition (released physically and digitally for Switch, and digitally on PlayStation 4 under the title Arcade Edition)
- Consumer Edition (released digitally for Switch and PlayStation 4)
- Special Edition (released physically for Switch, combining both of the above on one cartridge)

International releases

- Arcade Edition (released physically and digitally for PlayStation 4 and Switch, released digitally for PC through Steam)
- Console Edition (released physically and digitally for PlayStation 4 and Switch)
- International Edition (released physically for PlayStation 4 and Switch as a combination of the Arcade and Console Editions (separate CDs/ cartridges) with additional goodies)

== Sequel ==
A sequel, Darius Cozmic Revelation, was released physically for PlayStation 4 and Nintendo Switch on February 25, 2021, in Japan, containing the games G-Darius HD (also including the standard resolution version) and Dariusburst: Another Chronicle EX+. These games were also released separately on their respective digital storefronts worldwide and separate physical editions were released internationally. A 2022 update added G-Darius Ver. 2, G-Darius Ver. 2 HD and G-Darius for Consumer (the Japanese PlayStation port) to the compilation. This update was also added to the separate editions of G-Darius HD. A standalone port of G-Darius HD was released to Steam in the same year.

=== Editions ===
Japanese releases

- Both games are available separately in digital form.
- Regular Edition contains both games on one disc/cartridge.
- Limited Edition contains the Regular Edition and further goodies.

International releases

- Both games are available separately in digital form.
- Both games are available separately as physical game releases.
- Another Limited Edition was released by Strictly Limited Games with both games in one box on one disc/cartridge and further goodies.
  - The Switch release of this contains the Game Boy version of Sagaia as a bonus on the cartridge.

== Overview ==
Almost all of the editions feature different games.

		Japan				International			
Title	Original platform	Standard Edition	Consumer Edition	Special Edition	Darius Cozmic Revelation	Arcade Edition	Console Edition	International Edition	Darius Cozmic Revelation
Darius -Old Version-	Arcade	check		check		check		check	
Darius -New Version-	Arcade	check		check		check		check	
Darius -Extra Version-	Arcade	check		check		check		check	
Darius II -Dual Screen Version-	Arcade	check		check		check		check	
Sagaia -Version 1-	Arcade	check		check		check		check	
Sagaia -Version 2-	Arcade	check		check		check		check	
Darius Gaiden	Arcade	check		check		check		check	
Darius II	Sega Mega Drive (JPN)		check	check			check	check	
Sagaia	Sega Genesis (US)		via patch on Switch	via patch on Switch			check	check	
Sagaia	Master System (EU)		check	check			check	check	
Darius Twin	Super Famicom (JPN)		check	check			check	check	
Darius Twin	Super NES (US)		check	check			check	check	
Darius Force	Super Famicom (JPN)		check	check			check	check	
Super Nova	Super NES (US)		via patch on Switch	via patch on Switch			check	check	
Darius Alpha	PC Engine (JPN)		check	check			check	check	
Darius Plus	PC Engine (JPN)		via patch on Switch	via patch on Switch			check	check	
Sagaia	Game Boy	Amazon Prime Day Bonus DLC (Switch only)		Amazon Prime Day Bonus DLC (Switch only)					(Switch physical only)
G-Darius	Arcade				check				check
G-Darius HD	Arcade				check				check
G-Darius ver. 2	Arcade				check				check
G-Darius ver. 2 HD	Arcade				check				check
G-Darius	PlayStation (JPN)				check				check
Dariusburst: Another Chronicle EX+	Arcade				check				check
Darius -Extra Version-	Sega Mega Drive (Japan)				Amazon Prime Day Bonus DLC				
