= Darius Gaiden =

1994 arcade game

- Promotional flyer
- Developer: Taito (Note: Ported to Saturn by Aisystem Tokyo and to PlayStation by Nexus Interact.)
- Publisher: Taito
- Producer: Hidehiro Fujiwara
- Designer: Hisakazu Kato
- Programmer: Akira Kurabayashi
- Artist: Hirokazu Kato
- Composer: Hisayoshi Ogura
- Series: Darius
- Platforms: Arcade, Sega Saturn, PlayStation, Windows
- Release: September 1994: JP: September 1994; NA: November 1994; Saturn; JP: December 15, 1995; NA/EU: 1996; PlayStation; JP: December 20, 1996; Windows; JP: 1997; NA/EU: 1998
- Genre: Horizontal-scrolling shooter
- Modes: Single-player, multiplayer
- Arcade system: Taito F3 System

Darius Gaiden (Note: Japanese: ダライアス外伝, Hepburn: Daraiasu Gaiden; lit. 'Darius Outside Legend') is a 1994 horizontal-scrolling shooter arcade game developed and published by Taito. The fifth entry in its Darius series, players control a starship named the Silver Hawk in its mission to destroy the Belsar empire before it wipes out the population of planet Darius. Gaiden adds several new features to the core concepts of its predecessors, including screen-clearing black hole bombs and the ability to capture mid-level bosses. The game has been ported to several consoles, including the Sega Saturn and PlayStation.

Created by producer Hidehiro Fujiwara, Darius Gaiden was designed to show off the technological capabilities of Taito's then-new F3 System, an arcade board that utilized interchangeable cartridges. Though he had little exposure to the series, Fujiwara wanted to design a new Darius game that improved on its established concepts. The development team worked to retain many of the franchise's core elements while also focusing on creating a new and engaging experience. Originally titled Darius III, its name was changed to Darius Gaiden as its plot took place between the first two games; gaiden is the Japanese term for "side story".

Darius Gaiden was critically acclaimed in arcades, and received several awards. The home console conversions were also well received, with critics applauding its gameplay, attractive visuals, and responsive controls. Some felt its music was bizarre and unfitting, while some enjoyed its outlandish nature. Retrospectively, it has been ranked among the greatest side-scrolling shooters of all time. It was followed by G-Darius in 1997.

== Gameplay ==
The player launching a black hole bomb towards waves of enemies.

Darius Gaiden is a horizontal-scrolling shooter video game. The player controls a starship named the Silver Hawk in its mission to obliterate the Belsar empire, which is plotting to destroy what is left of the human race and their new home of planet Darius. A second player can join in at any time. The game uses a non-linear level progression system where players can select whichever level they choose after completing the previous one. There are twenty-seven stages total, with the player only being able to play seven of them at a time. In these levels, the Silver Hawk must destroy constantly moving formations of enemies while avoiding their projectiles, as well as dodging obstacles. Enemies are made to resemble fish, crabs, seahorses, and other aquatic creatures. Levels conclude with a boss that must be defeated by destroying its weak spot, such as its head or mouth.

The Silver Hawk begins the game with a forward-moving shot. Collecting colored emblems dropped by correspondingly colored enemies allows the player to power-up the Silver Hawk's abilities. Green emblems grant the player missiles, red emblems increase the length and power of shots, and blue emblems give the player a protective shield. Collecting additional emblems upgrades the player's weapons, such as a stronger shield or missiles that move forwards and backwards. The Silver Hawk also begins the game with three black hole bombs. Firing them creates a large swirling vortex that sucks in all enemies and projectiles, followed by lightning strikes that inflict massive damage on enemies. The Silver Hawk also has the ability to capture minibosses, which appear in the middle of most levels. This is accomplished by destroying the energy orb on its head and collecting it when it flies off. Captured minibosses ally with the player and fire their own weapons at enemies for a brief period of time, before they self-destruct.

== Development ==
Darius Gaiden was published by Taito as the third arcade installment in its Darius series, and the fifth entry overall. Its development was headed by producer Hidehiro Fujiwara, who was alongside designer and artist Hirokazu Kato, and programmer Akira Kurabayashi. Fujiwara had little exposure to the series aside from assisting in production of the original Darius. Nonetheless, he was a fan of the first game, and was ready to work on a sequel that could improve on concepts established by its predecessors. When Fujiawara was conceiving the idea for Gaiden, Taito released its F3 System, an arcade system board that allowed arcade operators to swap out games through interchangeable ROM cartridges, similar to the Neo Geo. Taito wanted big-name franchises to appear on its new board to increase awareness and attract attention, so Fujiwara proposed the idea of a Darius game as the series was well known in Japan. Taito approved the request and allowed development of Darius Gaiden to begin.

The original Darius and its sequel Darius II both used three individual monitors made to appear seamless via mirror effects. Kato insisted that Gaiden scrap this concept and use a single-screen display, as he felt the concept had grown old by that point. During production, the development team focused on making the game fun to play and unlike any other shooter before it to make it stand out. Fujiwara and the others also wanted the game to show off the technical capabilities of the F3 System, such as its sprite rotation and 3D effects. The game was originally titled Darius III, which was used in overseas marketing material. Due to the story taking place between Darius II and the first Darius, Kato decided to name the game Darius Gaiden, with "gaiden" being a Japanese term for "side story".

Though the team worked to make Gaiden feel fresh and new, they also focused on implementing many of the franchise's core concepts to make it feel like a proper sequel. Returning ideas include a similar stage structure, formidable opponents such as King Fossil and Vermilion Coronatus, and a proper storyline. The game's presentation was also a focal point; the programmers worked to add a number of flashy effects that showed off the F3 System's technological capabilities, though this also complicated the process of making sprites. Some characters, including the first stage boss Golden Ogre, were 3D models pre-rendered as 2D sprites. The midboss capture mechanic, a concept borrowed from an older Taito game, was thought to have made the game more complicated or unbalanced and was almost excluded from the final version.

=== Music ===
"Visionnerz (Hallucinated People)"
"Visionnerz" is the music used for the first level. The rest of the soundtrack is based on this piece in particular.

The soundtrack for Darius Gaiden was composed by Zuntata, the house band of Taito. The band's leader, Hisayoshi Ogura, was the director of the music. Ogura based its music on Jungian archetypes, presenting them in an operatic fashion. He describes the music for the first level, "Visionnerz", as being "the collapse of the ego given musical form". It uses lyrics pulled from other sources, which are based on the idea of "truth isn't what lies in front of you". Ogura intended the music to represent the game's dream-like stages and atmosphere. In an interview, he said: "If you were looking at something and it changed in front of your eyes, and you suddenly realized that everything you thought was an indisputable truth a second ago wasn't true at all, that would be a considerable shock to you. People in such situations would be unable to maintain their composure. They'd start to break down mentally. That's the kind of concept I wanted to convey through "Visionnerz" and the music of Darius Gaiden". The band's sound engineer, Katsuhisa Ishikawa, designed the game's sound effects.

The entire soundtrack was completed in order, with "Visionnerz" being the source of inspiration for most of the music. Unlike Taito's other game soundtracks, the one for Gaiden is synchronized to the gameplay and sound effects, which was possible through constant communication between programmers and sound designers. For the final stages, the music was made to change in tone when the boss shows up, creating an intense and ominous atmosphere. Ogura has claimed that Darius Gaiden is his favorite soundtrack in terms of direction.

== Release ==
Darius Gaiden was released in Japan in September 1994, and in North America in November. In promotional material, Taito advertised the game's new mechanics and more serious tone in promotional flyers. In the months after its debut, an updated version named Darius Gaiden Extra Edition was released. Extra Edition changes the level progression system slightly by swapping out easier levels with those that are much harder. It also provides minor alterations to the gameplay, such as increasing the rate of fire and removing the cap on the number of black hole bombs that can be carried. Extra Edition also has a gameplay mode that converts the branching stage paths into one long, singular run through every level.

The game has been ported to several consoles. It was first released on the Sega Saturn on December 15, 1995, in Japan. This version was released a year later in North America, where it was published by Acclaim Entertainment as part of its publishing deal with Taito. The Saturn version is a near-perfect port, with slight alterations to the soundtrack to accommodate for system limitations. A PlayStation version was released in Japan on December 20, 1996, which adds new computer-generated animated scenes. This version was developed by BEC. Darius Gaiden was released for Windows in 1997, which was subsequently re-released in North America in 2004. The 2005 PlayStation 2 and Xbox compilation Taito Legends 2 includes Darius Gaiden. Darius Gaiden is also included in Darius Cozmic Collection, released in 2019 for the Nintendo Switch, 2020 for PlayStation 4, and 2021 for Windows.

== Reception ==
Reception

Review scores
Publication	Score
Electronic Gaming Monthly	7.375/10
Famitsu	6/10, 9/10, 9/10, 9/10 (SS); 7/10, 5/10, 6/10, 7/10 (PS)
GameFan	97/100, 90/100, 95/100 (SS)
Next Generation	2/5 (SS)
PC Gamer (US)	74% (PC)
Sega Saturn Magazine	80% (SS)

Awards
Publication	Award
Famitsu	Gold Hall of Fame
Gamest	2nd Best Graphic; 3rd Best Shooting; 7th Grand Prize

Upon its debut in arcades, Darius Gaiden received critical acclaim, and was a commercial success. The Japanese magazine Gamest handed the game several awards, including the 2nd "Best Graphic", 3rd "Best Shooting", and 7th "Grand Prize" awards. Readers also voted it as being the fourth best arcade game of the year. Gamest commended Taito for not focusing on gimmicks like the panoramic screen, but instead on the gameplay by making it fresh and interesting. Staff praised the mechanics, soundtrack, graphical style, and overall presentation.

Home releases of Darius Gaiden, specifically the Sega Saturn version, also received positive reviews. The Saturn version sold over 70,000 copies in Japan alone. Famitsu awarded it the "Gold Hall of Fame" award, the magazine's second highest award for a game. Publications specifically focused on the gameplay and graphical style. The four reviewers for Electronic Gaming Monthly were impressed by the visuals for their 3D effect and detail, as were Famitsu staff and GamePro's Air Hendrix. Staff at GameFan compared its quality to SNK's Pulstar. Rad Automatic of Sega Saturn Magazine praised Gaiden for its graphics and action-packed gameplay, specifically the level of challenge and usage of branching level paths.

Critics felt indifferent about the soundtrack, some of whom liked its strangeness while others found it to be unfitting. The music was Automatic's sole complaint with the game, describing it as being "some fat bint warbling away like an Old Spice advert". Famitsu disagreed, claiming that the music gave the game some charm. GameFan said that Zuntata's compositions were surprisingly good and fit its atmosphere. Critics were also mixed towards the difficulty. Electronic Gaming Monthly stated that it was their only gripe towards Gaiden, feeling it was too high and made the game unnecessarily difficult to play. Automatic thought otherwise, saying that the difficulty was just right. GameFan staff argued that the Sega Saturn version was better than its arcade counterpart for its lack of slowdown and impressive graphical effects. Famitsu was less enthusiastic about the PlayStation conversion due to its slowdown problems, jerky scrolling, and unimpressive opening cutscenes. PC Gamer's Daniel Erickson, who reviewed the Windows version argued that the game wasn't as impressive as it used to be, but that the gameplay and responsive controls made it a worthy pickup for fans of the genre.

=== Retrospective feedback ===
Darius Gaiden has been listed as being among the greatest side-scrolling shooters of all time. In 2014, Eurogamer's Rupert Higham stated that Gaiden is "one of the most confident and accomplished sprite-based games ever imagined". He said that the game represented Taito's talent at designing unique stages that were fun to traverse through, and commented on the game's colorful, detailed visuals. Higham believes that Gaiden helped take the Darius franchise into a different direction, away from its focus on gimmicks such as the three-screen design and towards innovation and presentation. Higham also believes that Zuntata's soundtrack was one of the game's best and most memorable features. In 2016, Kurt Kalata of Hardcore Gaming 101 said that the game allowed the series to "[grow] its figurative beard" and become one of the most-respected shooter franchises. He praised the game for its visuals and level design; he especially praised the game's presentation for being one of the best for a shooter, and the "hauntingly beautiful" soundtrack for its strangeness, saying that it "[makes] for a game that is not only a great shoot-em-up, but also one of the finest audiovisual experiences in any 2D arcade game".
