= The Ninja Warriors =

1987 video game

- Japanese arcade flyer
- Developer: Taito
- Publishers: JP: Taito; NA: Romstar; EU: Electrocoin
- Director: Masaki Ogata
- Producer: Yojiro Suekado
- Designers: Hiroshi Tsujino; Yukiwo Ishikawa
- Programmer: Daisuke Sasaki
- Writer: Hiroshi Tsujino
- Composer: Hisayoshi Ogura
- Platforms: Arcade, Amiga, Atari ST, ZX Spectrum, Commodore 64, Amstrad CPC, PC Engine, Mega-CD
- Release: EU: January 1988; JP: February 1988; NA: March 1988
- Genre: Beat 'em up
- Mode: Single-player

The Ninja Warriors (Note: Japanese: ニンジャウォーリアーズ, Hepburn: Ninja Wōriāzu) is a 1988 beat 'em up video game developed and published by Taito for arcades. The original arcade game situated one display in between projected images of two other displays, creating the appearance of a triple-wide screen. Ports were released for home systems including the Amiga, Atari ST, ZX Spectrum, Commodore 64, Amstrad CPC, PC Engine, and Mega-CD.

A sequel with the same name was developed by Natsume Co., Ltd. and released in 1994, followed by the enhanced remaster The Ninja Saviors: Return of the Warriors in 2019.

== Gameplay ==
Arcade screenshot

The Ninja Warriors presents side-scrolling hand-to-hand combat. Players take control of Kunoichi (player 1) or Ninja (player 2) and fight wave after wave of Banglar forces across six levels. Button 1 attacks with a short-range kunai slash, while button 2 fires long-range shurikens that are limited in supply.

== Plot ==
The game is set in a dystopian future where Banglar, the President of the United States in 1993, has declared martial law nationwide. A group of anarchist scientists led by Mulk decide that it is time to revolt against the government. Knowing full well that fighting the military themselves would be suicidal, the scientists create two powerful androids to carry out the mission for them. The robots, code-named "Kunoichi" (red female) and "Ninja" (blue male), are sent by the scientists to end Banglar's tyranny once and for all.

== Development and release ==
The game's arcade cabinet is unique due to its three contiguous screens (one screen in the usual place for an arcade game, and two more screens in the cabinet below, reflected by mirrors on either side of the middle screen) which created the effect of a single 4:1 screen akin to the Polyvision format used in Abel Gance's Napoléon (1927), depicting ninjas. The same cabinet was also used for Darius and Darius II and Konami used a similar format for its X-Men arcade release (six players). The music was composed by Hisayoshi Ogura and Taito's in-house band Zuntata. Pony Canyon and Scitron released the two soundtracks for the game in 1988 and 1991, while further arrangements were released in 1993 and by Zuntata Records and Taito in 1988 and 2009.

The game was ported to various personal computers: the Commodore Amiga, Atari ST, Sinclair Spectrum 128K, Commodore 64 and Amstrad CPC. Home console versions of the game were released exclusively in Japan for the NEC PC Engine and Sega Mega-CD. Hamster Corporation released the arcade version as part of their Arcade Archives series for the PlayStation 4 in 2017 and Nintendo Switch in 2019. A new port based on the 1994 version titled The Ninja Warriors: Once Again was released in 2019 by Natsume Atari on Nintendo Switch. It features new artwork and two new playable characters.

== Reception ==
Reception

Review scores
Publication	Score							
Publication	Amiga	Arcade	Atari ST	C64	PC	Sega Genesis	TurboGrafx-16	ZX
ACE			830	825				
Amiga Action	77%							
Amiga Computing	93%							
Amiga Format	88%							
Crash								69%
Computer and Video Games		Positive					84%	
The Games Machine (UK)	90%		90%	85%	58% (CPC)			
Your Sinclair		Positive						75%
Zzap!64	82%			79%				
Commodore User	92%	8/10						
Mega						15% (CD)		

In Japan, Game Machine listed The Ninja Warriors on their April 1, 1988 issue as being the third most-successful upright arcade unit of the month. It went on to become Japan's eighth highest-grossing dedicated arcade game of 1988.

The arcade game received positive reviews. Clare Edgeley of Computer and Video Games reviewed the arcade game upon release, noted that it was one of several popular "martial arts simulation" games at London's Amusement Trades Exhibition International (ATEI) show in January 1988, along with Sega's Shinobi and Data East's Vigilante; she said it plays similarly to Shinobi, but that Ninja Warriors has a three-monitor cabinet like Darius (1986). She praised the large screen, "great" graphics, and fun gameplay, but said Shinobi and Vigilante were more challenging. Nick Kelly of Commodore User rated it 8 out of 10, also noting similarities to Shinobi, but preferring Ninja Warriors for its graphics and large screen. He said it was highly playable, "gorgeous looking" and technologically "a successful step" forwards. Your Sinclair gave it a brief positive review, recommending readers to look "out for it."

The home conversions also received mostly positive reviews, especially its 16-bit versions such as the ones for the Amiga. In 2010, CraveOnline featured the game (the arcade, SNES and Sega CD versions) on the list of top ten ninja games of all time. In 2008, GamesRadar featured Kunoichi as the best assassin in the video game history: "She cut a memorable figure, rocking the huge blonde ponytail and bright-red shozoku. On top of that, she wasn't just a ninja - she was a ninja Terminator. It's hard to imagine a better assassin than that". In 2006, Akiman drew her as his girl of the month for the Japanese magazine GAMAGA. Robert Workman of GameZone included Ninja and Kunoichi on his 2011 list of "best video game ninjas": "These guys are due for a return – and hopefully a better hyped one than Kage got a few years ago on DS?"

== Legacy ==
Natsume Co., Ltd. developed a 1994 follow-up for the Super NES also known as The Ninja Warriors, or The Ninja Warriors Again in Japan. An enhanced remaster of the Super NES game for the Nintendo Switch and PlayStation 4 was released in 2019.
