= Darius Force =

1993 video game

- North American cover art
- Developer(s): Taito
- Publisher(s): Taito
- Composer(s): Adrian Kusatsu, Yoshio Watanabe
- Series: Darius
- Platform(s): Super NES
- Release: JP: September 24, 1993; NA: December 1993
- Genre(s): Horizontal scrolling shooter
- Mode(s): Single-player

Darius Force, (Note: Japanese: ダライアスフォース, Hepburn: Daraiasu Fōsu) known as Super Nova in North America, is a horizontal scrolling shooter for the Super Famicom/SNES, released in 1993 and is part of the Darius series.

== Gameplay ==
One main difference between this game and the rest of the Darius games is that the player can choose one of three Silver Hawks to play. The green one is the Silver Hawk of Darius. The blue one is the Silver Hawk of Darius II. The red one is a new prototype of Silver Hawk that exists only in this game.

There are three power-ups in this game, which can be obtained in three ways:

- Destroying a complete formation of ships like in Darius II and Darius Twin or amoebas.
- Destroying a flashing meteor during a meteor rain.
- Destroying a futuristic cage on the floor and/or ceiling of an area.

The power-ups for this game are the red bubble (shot and bomb power up), the blue bubble (shield regenerate and level up), and the green bubble (randomly gives a bonus point or an extra ship). There is also a special power up that can destroy all enemies on screen if it's destroyed (like Darius II) or can make the Silver Hawk shoot a powerful laser beam if grabbed by the player.

There is no power-up bar, which means that if a Silver Hawk is destroyed, the shots and bombs are powered down to the minimum level. Also, when the player loses a ship on a stage, it is returned to the 'check point' (not identified in-game) of that stage; if the ship has lost during a boss, it also returns to the last 'check point' before the boss appears.

Like Darius Twin, the player uses (by default) the Y button for shots and the B button for dropping bombs. As long as the player keeps both buttons pressed, the shots are powered down one level. The player can switch between bombs and side laser guns by pressing the R button.

The stages map for this game is very different from the rest of the Darius games. This map contains 15 stages, but only allows the player to take the forward or up paths, until the player reaches the L, N or O stage. Each one of those three stages contains its own boss and ending.

== Reception ==
Reception

Review scores
Publication	Score
M! Games	58%
Nintendo Power	3/5 (Note: Nintendo Power scored Super Nova 3.1/5 for graphics/sound, 3.4/5 for play control, 2.9/5 for challenge, and 2.6/5 for theme/fun.)
Video Games (DE)	55%
