= Hisayoshi Ogura =

Japanese musician

Hisayoshi Ogura (小倉 久佳, Ogura Hisayoshi) is a former member of Taito Corporation's "house band" Zuntata. He is best known for his musical compositions in the Darius arcade series. His musical style is often experimental electronica. However, in Zoids Infinity Ex he focused on more on an orchestrated soundtrack. His Darius compositions range from cutesy, heartfelt denpa-style songs to rather powerful ones. His music for the Darius series can vary in style. For example, the music for Darius Gaiden is dark and gloomy, while the music for G-Darius is more carefree and upbeat. He also created the soundtrack to Ninja Warriors and voiced the character Marco in Kaiser Knuckle (known outside Japan as Global Champion).

Having left Zuntata by the time of Darius Burst, to which he contributed one new piece of music, being released, Ogura's company affiliation is listed in the game's all-English credits individually as "OguraHisayoshiOngaSeisakushow" (written in kanji as「小倉久佳音画制作所」; "Ogura Hisayoshi Soundscape Production Facility"), in contrast to the other composers' being listed as "ZUNTATA." His return as a free agent took place one year after leaving Zuntata.
