= Metal Black (video game) =

1991 video game

- Arcade flyer
- Developer: Taito
- Publisher: Taito
- Producer: Takamasa Hori
- Designer: Takatsuna Senba
- Programmers: Naoya Kuroki; Takashi Seguchi
- Artist: Ohno Wepokichi
- Composer: Yasuhisa Watanabe
- Platforms: Arcade, Sega Saturn
- Release: Arcade: JP/EU: November 1991; Saturn: JP: May 24, 1996
- Genre: Scrolling shooter
- Modes: Single-player, multiplayer
- Arcade system: Taito F1 System

Metal Black (Note: Japanese: メタルブラック, Hepburn: Metaru Burakku) is a 1991 horizontally scrolling shooter video game developed and published by Taito for arcades. Set in the dystopian future of 2052, players assume the role of rogue pilot John Ford taking command of the CF-345 Black Fly space fighter craft to defeat the Nemesis alien race and save humanity.

Created under the working title "Project Gun Frontier 2", Metal Black was made by most of the same staff behind Gun Frontier and ran on the Taito F1 System hardware, although its actual connection with the latter title is very loose. Under the initial internal name "Darius Part 22", development began as the third entry in the Darius series before being reworked into an original game, as its atmosphere was deemed to be very dark by Taito during production phase. Though first launched in arcades, it was later ported to the Sega Saturn and has since been re-released through compilations.

Metal Black was met with mixed reception from critics since its initial arcade release and later on the Saturn as an import title. The game later served as an inspiration for G.rev's Border Down, including its "beam level" system.

== Gameplay ==
Apartheid, the first boss of the game, showcasing an example of 'beam-dueling' in Metal Black. The blue beam on the left is the player's beam.

Metal Black is a scrolling shooter game where players assume the role of rogue pilot John Ford taking control of the CF-345 Black Fly space fighter craft across six increasingly difficult rounds to combat against the Nemesis alien race and save humanity. The gameplay is unique in that there are no alternative weapons or bombs; the only power-up players grab through rounds are the Newalone molecules scattered by Nemesis. Collecting it increases the ship's beam level, serving as the only defense mechanism. The more Newalone molecules players collect, the stronger the ship's firepower becomes.

When reaching a mid or max beam level, players can unleash a large beam to obliterate enemies caught within range and cause a lightning that briefly shocks the screen, destroying enemies around the ship. Enemies also have beam levels of their own, most notably the bosses, who in turn eat as much Newalone as they can to unleash their own beam. If the players and boss' large beams are fired simultaneously, one overpowers the other depending on how high each level is, starting a "beam duel". When "beam dueling", players must quickly tap the fire button to keep the opposing beam at bay, accumulating into a destructive energy matter that changes color based on which wielder's beam is stronger.

After the first and third rounds, a bonus round occurs to indicate players' advancement into space. Each bonus round has players encircle a group of enemies that must be destroyed by locking on the moving targets and launch cluster missiles under a time limit to gain extra points. Getting hit by enemy fire or colliding against solid stage obstacles will result in losing a life and once all lives are lost, the game is over unless the players insert more credits into the arcade machine to continue playing.

== Synopsis ==
The plot summary of Metal Black is explained further through supplementary materials. In the year 2042, a companion star of the planet Jupiter appears a few astronomical units away from the planet and propels the asteroids along Jupiter's orbit towards the Earth, creating a wave of meteorites. As Earth struggles to survive, extraterrestrial cybernetic invaders from beyond the distant star use the meteorites as cover to invade with little resistance, intending to plunder Earth for inorganic materials needed to sustain their forms. Both the aliens and the star they came from are quickly named 'Nemesis'.

What resistance the aliens face from Earth's combined international defense forces is quickly obliterated by the aliens' powerful beam weapons. Earth's scientists study the molecules that power the alien weaponry, which have started to litter the Earth, and the molecule is given the name 'Newalone'. With Newalone in their hands, scientists quickly begin Project Metal Black, focused on developing at least twenty-thousand human spacecraft capable of wielding the same beam weaponry as the aliens. The spacecraft is known as the CF-345 Black Fly, named for its method of Newalone energy use.

However, ten years after the invasion, Earth's remaining diplomats pass a treaty with the Nemesis forces outlining a peaceful surrender, which promises to keep all of Earth's remaining forces from attacking: this applies to Project Metal Black, preventing the Black Fly spacecraft's use. With the planet's population thinning and natural resources dwindling, a rogue pilot named John Ford commandeers one of the Black Fly craft in violation of the treaty, intending to strike back against Nemesis and save what remains of humanity.

The events within the game itself unfold over six stages as Ford pilots the Black Fly and travels to Jupiter, confronting powerful Nemesis ships along the way. In the final two stages, Ford breaches Nemesis itself, earning a crucial chance to defeat the invading forces once and for all. From this point, there are two possible endings: if the player gets a Game Over on the final stage, Ford's death incites a military coup d'état of the global government, and 20,000 Black Fly craft are dispatched to Nemesis's apparent origin point. Otherwise, Ford confronts the leader of Nemesis in a rapidly-shifting dimension, the battle apparently culminating with the Earth being split in two; it is left unclear as to whether the Earth's destruction and the events of the game as a whole ever actually occurred.

== Development ==
Metal Black was developed under the working title "Project Gun Frontier 2" by most of the same staff behind Gun Frontier, including its designer Takatsuna Senba and producer Takamasa "Tarabar" Hori but its actual connection to the latter is faint at best. According to Senba, development began as Darius 3 under the initial internal name "Darius Part 22" and the original plan was to announce it in a two-screen cabinet similar to Darius II.

== Release ==
Metal Black was released in arcades in November 1991. Prior to launch, it was showcased in a playable state to attendees at the 1991 Amusement Machine Show. The game ran on Taito's F1 System hardware, using expansion chips that allowed special graphical effects. A version named after Hori titled Metal Black: Tarabar Edition was created for internal use at Taito and not released for arcades, featuring only three stages and different music, as well as a new "extra stage" and more difficult enemy patterns. An album containing music from the game was co-published exclusively in Japan by Scitron and Pony Canyon in January 21, 1992. The title was later ported to the Sega Saturn by Ving and published only in Japan on May 24, 1996 under the "Arcade Gears" budget line. It has since been included as part of the Taito Legends 2 compilation for Microsoft Windows, PlayStation 2 and Xbox in 2006. The original arcade version was included as part of the Taito Egret II Mini dedicated console in 2022. In 2012, a compilation album containing its soundtrack, as well as the music from Gun Frontier and Dino Rex was released by SuperSweep in Japan. Hamster Corporation released the game as part of the Arcade Archives series for the Nintendo Switch and PlayStation 4 in November 2022.

== Reception ==
Reception

Review scores
Publication	Score
AllGame	(AC) 2/5
Famitsu	(SS) 20/40
Fun Generation	(SS) 4/10
Gamest	(AC) 32/50
Joypad	(SS) 1/5
neXt Level	(SS) 65%
Sega Saturn Magazine (JP)	(SS) 7.33/10

Award
Publication	Award
Micom BASIC Magazine (1992)	Video Game Grand Prix 6th (Arcade)

In Japan, Game Machine listed Metal Black on their February 1, 1992 issue as being the thirteenth most-popular arcade game at the time. According to Famitsu, the Saturn version sold over 7,839 copies in its first week on the market. Four reviewers of Famitsu gave the Sega Saturn version a score of 20 out of 40.

== Legacy ==
A similar "beam duel" system was featured in G-Darius. Hiroyuki Maruyama of G.rev stated that Metal Black was a heavy inspiration during development of Border Down, including its "beam level" system and also features references to the former in other ways. The CF-345 Black Fly appears as a downloadable ship in Dariusburst: Chronicle Saviours for PC, PlayStation 4 and PlayStation Vita.
