= Under Defeat =

2005 video game

- Developer: G.rev
- Publishers: Sega (Arcade) (Note: 2012 release published by Rising Star Games; 2024 release published by City Connection in Japan and Clear River Games in the west); G.rev (Dreamcast)
- Director: Hideyuki Kato
- Designer: Masakazu Takeda
- Programmer: Masakazu Takeda
- Artist: Nanashiki Yamamoto
- Composers: Shinji Hosoe; Yousuke Yasui (HD)
- Platforms: Arcade; Dreamcast; PlayStation 3; Xbox 360; Nintendo Switch; PlayStation 4; PlayStation 5; Windows; Xbox Series X/S
- Release: October 27, 2005: Arcade; JP: October 27, 2005 Dreamcast; JP: March 23, 2006 PS3, Xbox 360; JP: February 23, 2012; EU: November 9, 2012; NA: November 28, 2012 (PS3); NA: August 25, 2014 (X360) NS, PS4, PS5, Series X/S; JP: December 5, 2024; WW: February 6, 2025 Windows; WW: February 6, 2025
- Genre: Shoot 'em up
- Modes: Single-player, multiplayer
- Arcade system: Sega NAOMI

Under Defeat (Note: Japanese: アンダーディフィート, Hepburn: Andā Difīto) is a shoot 'em up video game developed by G.rev and released in Japanese arcades in 2005. The game takes place in an alternate reality during World War II, where players control German-speaking characters (dubbed "the Empire") fighting against English-speaking characters ("the Union"). Their vehicles are patterned after those of real-life Allied and Axis powers. A port for the Dreamcast was released in 2006 and marketed as the last game for the system, although two more were released the following year. The game was commercially successful, but received average reviews from critics because of its traditional and derivative gameplay.

A high-definition remaster, Under Defeat HD, was released for the PlayStation 3 and Xbox 360 in 2012, published by Rising Star Games. The updated version contains improved visuals, new control scheme options, and a new gameplay mode to adapt the game for 16:9 displays. This version was re-released in arcades as Under Defeat HD+. Another enhanced version by City Connection was released for Nintendo Switch, PlayStation 4, PlayStation 5 and Xbox Series X/S in 2024 in Japan, with Windows port and western release in 2025.

== Gameplay ==
The player firing at enemy battleships

In Under Defeat, the player assumes control of a helicopter. The gameplay bears resemblance to early Toaplan games such as Twin Cobra. It uses 3D graphics, and a slightly angled perspective to give the game more depth than most other titles in the genre. The player's helicopter can move in eight directions, though its move speed is fixed in relation to the stage's scroll speed.

The player has 3 basic forms of attack: the machine gun, bombs, and options. The primary weapon is the machine gun, which can fire a continuous stream of bullets. Bombs unleash a screen-devastating blast, destroying most enemies instantly, and protects the player's ship from enemy fire. The player begins each life with three bombs and can accumulate up to six. Finally, the helicopter has three possible weapon assists, or "options", which provide extra firepower. The weapon options are a machine gun, cannon, and rocket grenade. Using the right one at any given time determines how tough certain battles and stages will be.

== Development and release ==
Under Defeat was developed by G.rev for Sega's NAOMI arcade board. It was released in Japanese arcades on October 27, 2005, followed by a companion soundtrack release in December. A Dreamcast port was released on March 23, 2006, over five years after Sega announced they were pulling support for the system. G.rev promoted it as the last Dreamcast game, although Triggerheart Exelica and Karous were released for the system the following year. G.rev credited the promotion as helping its commercial success. It sold through its first printing within one week, becoming the best-selling game on the system since G.rev's own Border Down (2003). Dreamcast copies were released in limited numbers and continue to command high prices on secondary markets.

The music was composed by Shinji Hosoe, and has been described as jazz fusion. He was asked to compose music with a melancholic feel to correlate with the game's storyline, which made him emotional. A limited-edition version with a pack-in soundtrack CD was also released (different from the soundtrack released earlier).

=== Under Defeat HD ===
In response to fan requests for a re-release, G.rev announced a high-definition version of Under Defeat for PlayStation 3 and Xbox 360 in October 2011. The re-release was titled Under Defeat HD published by Rising Star Games. Most of G.rev's recent games were Xbox 360 exclusives, so out of fear of being framed exclusively as Xbox 360 developers in the industry, they decided to create a PlayStation 3 port as well. In addition to digital storefronts, G.rev produced physical copies as a show of gratitude to their fans. An arcade version was released in 2013 as Under Defeat HD+.

Building on the original, Under Defeat HD has a new gameplay mode, New Order mode, which stretches the gameplay to fill a 16:9 display and gives the player the ability to shoot at wider ranges. G.rev developed this mode in an effort to adapt the game for modern 16:9 displays. A new optional dual stick control setup was added as well. Under Defeat HD also has improved shadowing and textures. Because the textures were originally created in high resolution, the team used those to replace the lossy versions used in the original though some pixel art needed to be tediously enlarged. The team also needed to manually reproduce the deferred background polygon rendering, a process handled by PowerVR technology in the original arcade and Dreamcast hardware. The New Order mode also features a new soundtrack by SuperSweep composer Yousuke Yasui, who also scored G.rev's Mamorukun Curse!.

In April 2024, City Connection announced that it will release an updated version of Under Defeat HD for the PlayStation 5, Xbox, Nintendo Switch and PC. It features new music composed by original composer Shinji Hosoe, as well as contribution, rank and communications subtitles displays, and other features. In Japan, the game was released for the Nintendo Switch, PlayStation 4, PlayStation 5, and Xbox Series X/S on December 5, 2024. Clear River Games planned to publish the game in the west and for Windows via Steam on the same date, but later delayed the release until February 6, 2025.

== Reception ==
Reception

Aggregate score
Aggregator	Score	
Aggregator	Dreamcast	PS3
Metacritic	N/A	73/100

Review scores
Publication	Score	
Publication	Dreamcast	PS3
Destructoid	N/A	6.5/10
Edge	6/10	N/A
Eurogamer	7/10	N/A
Famitsu	27/40	28/40
GameRevolution	N/A	3.5/5
Hardcore Gamer	N/A	4/5
Push Square	N/A	7/10

Reviewing the Dreamcast version, Edge and Eurogamer agreed that Under Defeat was traditional in its gameplay, absent of the more inventive bullet patterns, scoring methods, and controls seen in modern shooters. Edge wrote that it although it lacks the excitement of other shooters, it makes up for it through rewarding dedicated players. Eurogamer described it as "'80s gaming dressed in '00s visuals running on '90s hardware" and recommended it for shooter aficionados. They also argued that the scarcity of good shoot 'em ups may influence fans of the genre to overstate Under Defeat's quality. They concluded their thoughts by calling it "sweet and eloquent but, [...] also tired and relentlessly derivative. Whether that annoys you or not depends on whether you were looking simply some well-made twitch fun or a glorious resurrection." Both publications praised the graphics, particularly the explosions and smoke effects. In a retrospective review, Retro Gamer praised the game's particle effects and wrote that Under Defeat "shows how, with good developers, the Dreamcast was perfectly capable of hanging with the competition."

Critics reviewing the high-definition version primarily recommended the game for fans of the shooter genre. Push Square wrote that its longevity was mostly in beating high scores, for better or worse. GameRevolution called it "a game trapped in time" for its traditional feel, but felt the game's unique controls will give satisfying nuance for shooter fans. Destructoid wrote that "getting used to Under Defeat’s controls is both the game's blessing and curse", believing that perhaps the game was developed for arcade sticks and a standard controller was not ideal. Critics overall praised the graphical improvements.
