= Border Down =

2003 video game

- Arcade flyer
- Developer: G.rev
- Publisher: G.rev
- Producer: Hiroyuki Maruyama
- Programmer: Katsuyuki Fujita
- Artist: Tsukasa Kado
- Composer: Yasuhisa Watanabe
- Platforms: Arcade, Dreamcast
- Release: Arcade: JP: 25 April 2003; Dreamcast: JP: 25 September 2003
- Genre: Scrolling shooter
- Mode: Single-player
- Arcade system: Sega NAOMI

Border Down is a horizontal scrolling shooter video game developed and published by G.rev. It was released in Japanese arcades in April 2003 on Sega NAOMI hardware, and was ported to the Dreamcast later that year. The story takes place in the future where humans are defending their Mars colony from an invading alien attack. The game employs a "border system" where each stage has three variations of different difficulty. The player starts on the easiest variation, and is lowered to a more difficult variation with each subsequent loss of a life.

Producer Hiroyuki Maruyama was heavily inspired by Taito's shooter Metal Black (1991) and founded G.rev with ex-Taito employees specifically to develop a shooter of his own. The team of five did subcontract work to gather funding and build their skills programming NAOMI arcade hardware. Among the projects they worked on were Treasure's Ikaruga (2001) and Gradius V (2004). Due to lack of funds, they were not able to realize all the ideas they conceptualized for the game. Border Down was released to mixed reception, but was commercially successful and continues to maintain a steady interest from shooter fans. G.rev went on to make other shoot 'em ups including Senko no Ronde and Under Defeat.

== Gameplay ==
The player, controlling the red ship, fights off enemies to the right in the first stage.

Border Down is a side-scrolling shoot 'em up set in a futuristic setting. Centuries after humans have colonized Mars, hostile aliens begin attacking the planet. The Mars defense force mobilizes and launch a new type of unmanned aircraft. The player takes on the role of a pilot, controlling the aircraft through a remote control interface. The game's name is derived from its "border system". Each stage has three parallel variations, or "borders" of varying difficulty. The player starts on the easiest border ("green"), and if they lose a life, drop to "yellow", and then finally the difficult "red" border. If the player loses a life in the red border, it is game over, though a continue option can be unlocked through repeated play. Each border is slightly different from the others, usually featuring other enemies and modified stage layouts and backgrounds. The final stage and ending are determined by the amount of time spent in each border during a playthrough. The Dreamcast version also features a "Remix mode" with new enemy attack patterns.

The ship's main weapon can either be fired as a continuous barrage of bullets by holding down the fire button, or as a set of homing missiles by tapping it. A power meter slowly fills up over time which determines the strength of the ship's weaponry. It can also be boosted by destroying enemies. This meter can also power a secondary laser attack, which has an additional function of canceling out any boss attack, reflecting it back at them. Using the laser comes at a cost, as it drains the meter and therefore weakens the main weapon.

== Development ==
Border Down was developed and published by G.rev, a team founded by producer Hiroyuki Maruyama with the explicit purpose to develop a shoot 'em up. The team consisted of five ex-Taito employees: three programmers, one designer, and Maruyama himself. After founding the company in July 2000, he first needed to build capital and give his team an opportunity to learn the skills and techniques to develop a shooter. They were able to gather most of the funds through producing their first game, Doki Doki Idol Star Seeker (2001), a puzzle game for the Sega's NAOMI arcade board. The remaining amount was accumulated through freelance work, including subcontract work with Treasure on two shooters, Ikaruga (2001) and Gradius V (2004). Ikaruga gave G.rev the key experience of programming for NAOMI hardware.

The initial concept for Border Down took root with Maruyama before he founded G.rev. He was heavily inspired by Taito's shooter Metal Black (1991), specifically the game's "Beam Level" system. He also borrowed ideas from his experiences with producing G-Darius (1997) with Taito, particularly the game's branching level system which inspired the border system in Border Down. With a parallel world system like this, the team would not need to develop as many distinct levels. This was one of the few parts of his original concept that was kept in the final game. For visual inspiration, Maruyama pulled from Kim Stanley Robinson's science fiction novel Red Mars. Character design was handled by artist Tsukasa Kado. The music was composed by Yasuhisa Watanabe, who also composed the music to Metal Black and was the only member of the staff who had worked on the 1991 shooter.

The team had to cut a significant amount of material due to lack of funds. In particular Maruyama wanted to flesh out the ending and opening cinematics. They also had plans for more visual flair, including background details and explosion effects, but had to cut about a third of these ideas because of the NAOMI's graphical limitations. They commissioned help for extra sound and design work. In Game One's 2006 French TV documentary Japon: Histoire du Shooting Game, Maruyama said that all he wanted was to make Border Down and that if G.rev collapsed afterwards, he would have been happy.

== Release ==
Border Down was released in Japanese arcades on 25 April 2003. It was common for NAOMI shooters to be ported to Sega's home console, the Dreamcast, making a significant portion of the aging console's extended output. Sega had effectively ceased support for the system in the west by this time, but some support remained in Japan. Although a Dreamcast conversion would seem like an obvious choice with it being a NAOMI game, G.rev spent time considering which console was most suitable for a home port. They decided against the PlayStation 2 because the game would have needed a complete rebuild from the ground up. As for the GameCube, they believed Border Down was not suited for the system's audience. With these factors, along with the ease of porting NAOMI games to the Dreamcast, they chose Sega's home console. According to Edge and Jeuxvideo.com, a fan petition for a Dreamcast port was another factor. The simplicity of the porting process left G.rev with more time to add the Remix mode.

The Dreamcast port was released a few months after the arcade version, on 25 September 2003. If bought through Sega Direct, the game came with a Border Down branded mouse pad. In addition to the standard version, 3000 limited edition copies were produced that came bundled with the soundtrack. The soundtrack contains tracks not included in the original game, and was also sold separately. Maruyama was prepared to fold G.rev if Border Down was not successful, but the number of customer orders at launch exceeded G.rev and Sega's expectations, so they continued producing new copies until they felt demand was met.

Border Down has seen continued interest post-release. A second volume to the soundtrack was released on 13 May 2004 through Sega Direct, containing tracks from the Remix mode and an original track by Watanabe. By 2007, Japanese retailer Messe Sanoh was still seeing demand for the game, and so requested Sega and G.rev for another production run. Their request was granted; a second run was produced and sold exclusively through Messe Sanoh retailers beginning on 17 January 2008. Both production runs included, less than 20,000 copies were sold. It has since become one of the most coveted Japanese exclusives for Dreamcast collectors. In 2011, Maruyama said that he would consider rereleasing Border Down or his 2005 game Under Defeat on modern platforms. Under Defeat was rereleased in 2012 for the PlayStation 3 and Xbox 360. A resin kit for the player ship from Border Down was released in February 2013.

== Reception ==
Initial reactions to the arcade release were mixed. Maruyama recalled: "It's a really individualistic type of game, so when we first released it [in the arcades] it received both positive and negative reactions". Edge gave the Dreamcast version a 6 out of 10, feeling that the game had all the ingredients to be an outstanding shooter, but lacked the energy to push it to that next level. They explained that Border Down lacked the intensity to frighten players, and felt that good shooters need that type of panic inducing gameplay.

In retrospect, Eurogamer called Border Down "arguably [G.rev's] best game", among the likes of Senko no Ronde and Under Defeat. Retro Gamer called it one of the highest regarded late-era releases for the Dreamcast. Kurt Kalata of Hardcore Gaming 101 wrote that the game remains popular with hardcore shoot 'em up fans, but found it hard to recommend given its high price tag within secondary markets. Jeuxvideo.com believed it to be the best horizontal shooter for the Dreamcast. Kalata and Jeuxvideo.com agreed that the game had excellent replayability due to the border and scoring systems. Retro Gamer thought the graphics were good for the game's limited budget, and Jeuxvideo.com agreed, but Kalata believed they were bland outside of some interesting backgrounds. Regarding the music, Retro Gamer wrote that it was "strong enough to stand on its own", while Kalata and Jeuxvideo.com felt it was strange synth and techno jazz. Kalata felt gameplay similarities to the Darius series, while Jeuxvideo.com called it a great mix of classic style shooters like R-Type and more modern manic shooters.
