= Darius (series) =

Shoot 'em up video game franchise

- Genre: Horizontal-scrolling shooter
- Developer: Taito
- Publisher: Taito
- Platforms: Arcade, Sega Genesis, Super Nintendo Entertainment System, Sega Saturn, PlayStation, Mobile phone, PlayStation Portable, PlayStation Vita, iOS, PlayStation 4, Nintendo Switch
- First release: Darius; February 1987
- Latest release: Darius Cozmic Collection; February 28, 2019

Darius (Note: Japanese: ダライアス, Hepburn: Daraiasu) is a shoot 'em up video game franchise developed and published by Taito. The eponymous first game was released in February 1987 for arcades, and has since been followed by six sequels and several spin-offs. The series takes place during the events of a war between humans and the Belsar empire, which plot to destroy all that is left of mankind. Darius is known for its branching stage paths, upbeat and often eccentric soundtrack, and sea life-inspired enemies.

== Development ==
The series first appeared in Japanese game centers in 1987, where Darius became known for its "colossal" triple-screen arcade machine setup and body-sonic seats. It was known as the first arcade game to combine "high-impact engineering" with "creative presentation". Compared to the technology of Ultra Panavision 70 in how the series utilized color, it also used an "innovative" branching stage format that allowed for multiple playthroughs to be different in major ways. The series is also known for its cute graphics, upbeat soundtrack, and sound effects.

The series' use of robotic fish, crustaceans, and other sea creatures as enemies was cited as a way to make the games stand out due to the proliferation of sci-fi arcade shooters in the mid-1980s'.

== List of games in the series ==
Release timeline
| 1987 | Darius |
1988
| 1989 | Darius II |
| 1989 | Sagaia |
1990
| 1991 | Darius Twin |
1992
| 1993 | Darius Force |
| 1993 | Super Nova |
| 1994 | Darius Gaiden |
1995–1996
| 1997 | G-Darius |
1998–2001
| 2002 | Darius R |
2003–2008
| 2009 | Dariusburst |
2010–2011
| 2012 | Dariusburst Second Prologue |
2013–2014
| 2015 | Dariusburst: Chronicle Saviours |
2016–2018
| 2019 | Darius Cozmic Collection |
2020
| 2021 | Darius Cozmic Revelation |

=== Arcade releases ===
- Darius (1987)
  - Darius Extra Version (1987): An updated and rebalanced version of the above based on player feedback.
- Darius II (1989): The game was released in both triple- and double-screen (more common) versions. An international version with various changes was released titled Sagaia; accordingly, this name is commonly associated with Darius II outside Japan.
- Darius Gaiden (1994): This game was originally announced as Darius III.
- G-Darius (1997)
  - G-Darius Ver.2 (1997): An updated and rebalanced version of the above. Not much is known about it, other than it being developed after the PlayStation port.
- Dariusburst Another Chronicle (2010): Related to the PSP Dariusburst.

=== Consumer releases ===
==== Original works ====
- Darius Twin (1991): An original game for the Super Famicom/SNES. Gameplay is mostly based on Darius II.
- Darius Force (1993): Another original game for the Super Famicom/SNES and follow-up to Twin. Again, gameplay is mostly based on Darius II.
- Dariusburst (2009): Released for the PSP. Meant to be the follow-up to G-Darius.

==== Ports and conversions ====
- Darius+ (1989): Released for various Western home PCs like the Atari ST, the Amiga, and the ZX Spectrum. Based loosely on the original Darius.
- Super Darius (1990): A conversion of Darius for the PC Engine's Super CD-ROM², very close to the original other than being single-screen. Features new bosses, as well as a "boss rush" mode.
  - Darius Alpha (1990): Released alongside Super Darius in an unknown manner; it is considered to be extremely rare. A conversion of the above's boss rush as a regular PC Engine HuCard, something of a demo for the later Darius Plus. Some bosses were removed.
  - Darius Plus (1990): The full game itself, again a PC Engine HuCard. The bosses that were removed in Alpha do not return here. Both Alpha and Plus were actually written for the PC Engine SuperGrafx and playing them on that console results in slightly improved graphics (less flicker and slowdown).
  - Darius (2019): A conversion of Darius for Sega and its Sega Genesis Mini and Sega Mega Drive Mini, albeit with only single player action, as opposed to two player simultaneous action, as was with its prototype form, and also naturally confined to a single screen, rather than the two screen, or the even rarer three screen, arcade cabinets views, and the player spawns immediately, rather than being sent back to the nearest checkpoint, but it otherwise pretty much plays like its original arcade form. A notable fact of this conversion port of the game is that a single person, Hideki Konishi, who made this port of the game as a hobby in his off time from his regular job, had also impressed Taito so much with the conversion, as well as even Sega, of his one-person company effort that he made of the version of Darius for the Sega Genesis, and Sega Mega Drive, that he was officially allowed to work with M2 and Taito, and their partner company, Sega, to make this conversion of Darius for the Sega Genesis Mini and the Sega Mega Drive Mini.
  - Darius Extra Version (2021): An updated version of the port of Darius for the Sega Genesis Mini, and the Sega Mega Drive Mini, which is also made by the same person, Hideki Konishi, but, this time, is published by both Columbus Circle Games and Strictly Limited Games, depending on the region, for the Sega Genesis and Sega Mega Drive. (Columbus Circle Games also published Darius Cozmic Collection around the same time as well). This version of Darius also was an updated version of Darius in its original arcade game form, and it also has the same title, but it also offers more options than the other versions of Darius Extra Version.
- Darius II (1990): A conversion of Darius II for the Mega Drive. Some changes to bosses and levels even beyond having to rebalance levels for single-screen purposes. Has a secret boss rush mode itself. This port was released in the US, under the Sagaia name. Columbus Circle Games also made a reissue of Darius II for the Sega Mega Drive, though it is unknown on whether it was also released for the Sega Genesis.
- Sagaia (1991): A partly original game for the Game Boy. Something of a "special version" of Darius, like with Darius+. The total package is very similar to Nemesis.
- Sagaia (1992): A Europe-only conversion of Darius II for the Master System, related to and based on the above Mega Drive version. Not to be confused with the above.
- Super Darius II (1993): A conversion of Darius II for the PC Engine's Super CD-ROM² add-on. Essentially a remake: full arranges for every original song plus new songs entirely, a completely different set of bosses, otherwise redesigned zones and their enemies, etc.
- Darius Gaiden (1995, 1996, 1998): A conversion of Darius Gaiden for Sega Saturn, PlayStation, and Windows, respectively. Fairly close to the original.
- Darius II (1996): A conversion of Darius II for the Sega Saturn. Known for being very close to the original, even allowing for a simulated double-screen view.
- G-Darius (1998, 2001): A port of G-Darius to PlayStation and Windows respectively. Near perfect, since the arcade version used PlayStation-based hardware itself; the Windows version is a direct port of this, even featuring PlayStation controller buttons. The game includes features like boss rush, etc.
- Darius R (2002): A semi-remake of Darius for Game Boy Advance. A mix of various other games in the series.
- Darius Gate, Darius Ocean, Darius Wide, etc. (2002~2007): Various conversions of Darius (specifically Super/Plus) for mobile phone services like i-mode, Yahoo! Mobile, and EZ Appli.
- Taito Memories and Taito Legends (2005~2006): Buried within this large series of compilations are ports of Darius II, Darius Gaiden, and G-Darius.
- Dariusburst Second Prologue (2012): A port of Dariusburst for iOS and Android OS devices. Contains a "remixed" version of the original among other things, such as content from Another Chronicle.
- Dariusburst: Chronicle Saviours (2015): An enhanced version of Dariusburst for PlayStation 4, PlayStation Vita, and Microsoft Windows.
- A port of Darius II is featured in the second Taito Milestones collection.

==== Related games ====
- Syvalion (1988): Originally presented as a sequel to Darius. Music from the game appears in Dariusburst.
- Metal Black (1991): Initially planned as Darius 3. Features a number of fish-based machines from Darius. It is a successor to Gun Frontier.
- Border Down (2003): A successor to Metal Black developed by some members of the original team who started their own company, G.rev, to specifically make this game.
