= Grev =

Grev may refer to:

- the Swedish equivalent of the German noble title Graf
- G.rev, a Japanese video game developer
