= Border Downs =

Border Downs may refer to:

- Border Downs, New South Wales, a town in Australia
- Border Downs/Tintinara Crows, an Australian rules football club in the Mallee Football League (South Australia)

== See also ==
- Border Down, a horizontal scrolling shooter arcade game created in 2003
