= Darius Twin =

1991 video game

- North American box art
- Developer: Taito
- Publisher: Taito
- Director: Kouji Yamazaki
- Producer: Takao Ueno
- Programmers: Junichiro Noguchi; Mituo Ogura; Yasutaka Minami
- Artists: Keisuke Miyanaga; Shin Saitō; Tōru Kawaishi
- Composers: Kazuyuki Ōnui; Norihiro Furukawa
- Series: Darius
- Platform: Super Nintendo Entertainment System
- Release: JP: 29 March 1991; NA: November 1991; EU: 22 April 1993
- Genre: Scrolling shooter
- Modes: Single-player, multiplayer

Darius Twin (Note: Japanese: ダライアスツイン, Hepburn: Daraiasu Tsuin) is a 1991 horizontally scrolling shooter video game developed and published by Taito for the Super Nintendo Entertainment System. It is part of the Darius series. It was re-released for the Wii Virtual Console in Japan on April 13, 2010 and in North America on December 13, 2010.

== Gameplay ==
Gameplay screenshot

Though similar to the arcade Darius entries, Darius Twin has slightly different gameplay features, most notably in the player's power-ups. Players collect weapon and shield power-ups from square shaped enemies that approach from the front and behind, but once players die after collecting a certain number of power-ups, the power-ups collected stayed with the ship post-destruction. Players 1 and 2 are allowed their own separate number of lives. There are no continues.

The game contains five color-coded classes of power-up. The pink item powers up the main weapon, green powers up the side weapons, blue regenerates and/or improves the force shield, orange gives one extra Silver Hawk, and yellow destroys all enemies on-screen. At two points in the game, the player can find a red power-up with a special purpose. It switches the main weapon shot style between that seen in Darius and Darius II.

== Reception ==
Reception

Aggregate score
Aggregator	Score
GameRankings	58.60%

Review scores
Publication	Score
Computer and Video Games	88/100
Electronic Gaming Monthly	6/10, 7/10, 7/10, 6/10
Famitsu	27/40
Games-X	4/5
Nintendo Power	3.3/5>
Super Play	7/10
Total!	62%
Control	54%
Game Boy	3/5, 4/5, 3/5, 2/5, 4/5
Game Zone	4/5
SNES Force	50%
Super Action	90%
The Super Famicom	85/100
Super Pro	68%

According to Famitsu, Darius Twin sold 27,104 copies during its lifetime in Japan. The Japanese publication Micom BASIC Magazine ranked the game fifth in popularity in its June 1991 issue, and it received a 22.7/30 score in a readers' poll conducted by Super Famicom Magazine. It also received a mixed reception, holding a rating of 58.60% based on five reviews according to review aggregator GameRankings.

In 2018, Complex named Darius Twin 56th on its "The Best Super Nintendo Games of All Time". They called the game as one of the best 2D scrolling shooters on the SNES and noted the gameplay being difficult.
