= G.rev =

Japanese video game developer

- Company type: Yūgen gaisha
- Industry: Video games
- Headquarters: Japan
- Products: Arcade shoot 'em ups
- Number of employees: 10 (2011)
- Website: grev.co.jp

G.rev Ltd. (有限会社グレフ, Yūgen Gaisha Gurefu), short for G.revolution, is a Japanese video game developer. The company was founded by former employees of Taito's arcade division who had worked on G-Darius and RayStorm, and is known primarily for their arcade shoot 'em up games.

== History ==
G.rev was founded with the mission of developing arcade shooters, but they realized the cost of development was more than their initial investment capital. To generate revenue, they took on contract work for Taito and Treasure, co-developing the popular shooter Ikaruga with the latter. This relationship would remain fruitful, with G.rev assisting again on Gradius V, and Ikaruga director Hiroshi Iuchi assisting on G.rev's own Strania: The Stella Machina. G.rev's first independent release was a puzzle game, Doki Doki Idol Star Seeker, a Mine Sweeper-like arcade puzzle game, created with low investment and high returns in mind.

With the money in place to develop a full-fledged arcade shooter on their own, the team, under direction of president Hiroyuki Maruyama, set out to develop Border Down as a spiritual successor to the Taito arcade classic Metal Black. Border Down was met with wide acclaim among shooter fans following the release of its Dreamcast port, with particular praise paid to its unique beam mechanics and "border system", which put players on different paths if they died. They followed this success with Under Defeat, a helicopter shooter praised for its gritty wartime atmosphere. Its port to Dreamcast would be one of the last games released on the system.

Their next release was the unique hybrid game WarTech: Senko no Ronde, which combined shooter-like firing patterns and themes in a projectile-based fighting game similar to Taito's Psychic Force series. With the Dreamcast shooter support diminishing, they chose to port the Sega NAOMI game to Xbox 360, remaking the game's graphics and adding gameplay enhancements along the way. This release, Senko no Ronde Rev. X, became the first G.rev game to be released in North America as WarTech: Senko no Ronde. The American release was met with mixed reviews that praised the title's innovation but criticized the brief length and high pricepoint. Some of the gameplay enhancements of Rev. X were carried over to the arcade release Senko no Ronde SP.

Following the formation of Gulti, another small developer formed by veterans of the shooter genre, G.rev proposed a collaborative effort, as Gulti did not have the capital needed for a full-scale shooter of their own. The two companies created Mamoru-kun wa Norowarete Shimatta, an overhead-view, multi-directional shooter with a Japanese fantasy theme, initially released on the NAOMI. The title was ported to Xbox 360 and a widescreen version made it to PlayStation 3 much later.

The company's next title was Senko no Ronde DUO: Dis-United Order, a sequel to their earlier crossover title. This time, G.rev chose to develop for the more powerful Taito X2 hardware, allowing the graphical quality of the arcade version to match the later Xbox 360 port. Unlike its predecessor, the title was not released outside Japan.

G.rev continued to develop on the Taito X2 hardware, releasing Strania: The Stella Machina, a vertically scrolling shooter that allows players to arm two different selectable/upgradable weapons at once. For the first time, G.rev decided to forgo a retail release, instead releasing an Xbox Live Arcade title, and promising some of the usual bonus features like an alternate course as future downloadable content. The home version was released simultaneously across all regions, giving Western gamers their first G.rev title since Wartech. They would later update the game as Strania EX for arcades on exA-Arcadia released in September 2020 to have both the Strania and Vower sides playable from the beginning, added the arranged soundtrack and a new Hell mode.

== Games developed ==
=== Arcade games ===
| Game | Year | Hardware | Publisher(s) |
|---|---|---|---|
| Doki Doki Idol Star Seeker | 2001 | Sega NAOMI | G.rev |
| Border Down | 2003 | Sega NAOMI | G.rev |
| Senko no Ronde | 2005 | Sega NAOMI | Sega |
| Senko no Ronde NEW VER. | 2005 | Sega NAOMI | Sega |
| Under Defeat | 2005 | Sega NAOMI | Sega |
| Senko no Ronde SP | 2006 | Sega NAOMI | Sega |
| Mamoru-kun wa Norowarete Shimatta! | 2008 | Sega NAOMI | G.rev |
| Senko no Ronde Dis-United Order | 2009 | Taito Type X² | G.rev |
| Senko no Ronde Dis-United Order Ver 2.0 | 2009 | NESiCAxLive | G.rev |
| Seisou Kouki Strania | 2011 | NESiCAxLive | G.rev |
| Under Defeat HD+ | 2013 | RingEdge 2 | G.rev |
| Seisou Kouki Strania EX | 2020 | exA-Arcadia | exA-Arcadia |

Console games

| Game | Year | System | Publisher(s) | JP | NA | EU |
|---|---|---|---|---|---|---|
| Doki Doki Idol Star Seeker Remix | 2002 | Dreamcast | G.rev | Yes | No | No |
| Border Down | 2003 | Dreamcast | G.rev | Yes | No | No |
| Under Defeat | 2006 | Dreamcast | G.rev | Yes | No | No |
| WarTech: Senko no Ronde / Senko no Ronde Rev. X | 2006 (JP); 2007 (NA & EU) | Xbox 360 | Sega (JP); Ubisoft (NA & EU) | Yes | Yes | Yes |
| Mamoru-kun wa Norowarete Shimatta! | 2009 | Xbox 360 | G.rev | Yes | No | No |
| Senko no Ronde DUO | 2010 | Xbox 360 | G.rev | Yes | No | No |
| Strania | 2011; 2015 | XBLA; Microsoft Windows | G.rev | Yes | Yes | Yes |
| Mamorukun Curse! | 2011 (JP); 2013 (NA) | PlayStation 3 | Cyberfront (JP); UFO Interactive (NA) | Yes | Yes | No |
| Under Defeat HD | 2012 | Xbox 360; PlayStation 3 | G.rev (JP); Rising Star Games (NA & EU) | Yes | Yes^{a} | Yes |
| Kokuga | 2012 (JP); 2013 (NA & EU) | Nintendo 3DS | G.rev | Yes | Yes^{b} | Yes |
| GameCenter CX: 3-Chōme no Arino | 2014 | Nintendo 3DS | Bandai Namco Games | Yes | No | No |
| Dariusburst Chronicle Saviours | 2016 | PlayStation 4, PlayStation Vita, Microsoft Windows | Kadokawa Games | Yes | Yes | Yes |
| Senko no Ronde 2 | 2017 | PlayStation 4, Microsoft Windows | Kadokawa Games | Yes | Yes | Yes |
| Yurukill: The Calumniation Games ^{c} | 2022 | Nintendo Switch, PlayStation 4, PlayStation 5, Microsoft Windows | IzanagiGames (JP); NIS America (NA & EU) | Yes | Yes | Yes |
| Ninja Kamui: Shinobi Origins | 2024 | Nintendo Switch, PlayStation 4, Microsoft Windows | Rainmaker Productions | Yes | Yes | Yes |
| Under Defeat | 2024 (JP); 2025 (NA & EU) | Nintendo Switch, PlayStation 4, PlayStation 5, Xbox Series X and Series S, Microsoft Windows | City Connection (JP); Clear River Games (NA & EU) | Yes | Yes | Yes |
| Strania -The Stella Machina- EX | 2025 | Nintendo Switch | G.rev | Yes | Yes | Yes |
| Mamorukun ReCurse! | 2025 | Nintendo Switch, PlayStation 5, Xbox Series X and Series S, Microsoft Windows | City Connection (JP); Clear River Games (NA & EU) | Yes | Yes | Yes |

Notes

^a North American Xbox 360 version was released in 2014.
^b Not released in Canada.
^c Shoot 'em up portion only.

=== Mobile games ===
| Game | Year | Platform | Publisher(s) |
|---|---|---|---|
| Star Seeker | 2002 | Mobile | Taito / G.rev |
| Fairyland Story | 2003 | Mobile | Taito |
| Densha De Go! 3D | 2003 | Mobile | Taito |

== Games published ==
| Game | Year | System | Developer(s) | JP | NA | EU |
|---|---|---|---|---|---|---|
| Gunhound EX | 2013 | PlayStation Portable | Dracue | Yes | No | No |

== Other works ==
- The Kaiten Mawasunda!! mini-game in SIMPLE 1500 Series Vol. 66 (2001, PlayStation) - Design.
- Ikaruga — (2001, NAOMI / Dreamcast / GameCube) - Programming and background graphic design.
- Gradius V — (2004, PlayStation 2) - Programming and background graphic design.
