= Yurukill: The Calumniation Games =

- Developers: IzanagiGames; G.rev
- Publishers: JP: IzanagiGames (Note: Published the Windows version internationally); NA, PAL: NIS America (Note: Console versions only.)
- Platforms: Nintendo Switch, PlayStation 4, PlayStation 5, Windows, Xbox Series X/S
- Release: JP: May 26, 2022 (consoles); JP: July 8, 2022 (Windows); NA: July 5, 2022; PAL: July 8, 2022
- Genres: Visual novel, Scrolling shooter

Yurukill: The Calumniation Games (冤罪執行遊戯ユルキル, Enzai shikkō yūgi yurukiru; lit. 'False Accusation Game Yurkill') is a 2022 video game developed by IzanagiGames and G.rev for the Nintendo Switch, PlayStation 4, PlayStation 5, Windows and Xbox Series X/S. A multi-genre game combining visual novel and shoot 'em up gameplay, the title centres on a group of convicts which profess innocence for crimes which they have been convicted of. The convicted 'prisoners,' each teamed up with a civilian 'executioner,' compete on the fictional island of Yurukill Land, for which the winning team is rewarded with the wiping of the prisoners' criminal record and the granting of the executioner's greatest wish.

The game released on May 22, 2022 in Japan and in July in international markets. Upon release, Yurukill received mixed reception, although general praise was offered for its premise and unconventional fusion of genres.

== Plot ==
Six convicts, Sengoku Shunju (arson resulting in 21 counts of murder, sentenced to 999 years), twins Futa and Raita Yamada (robbery and double homicide, sentenced to 78 years), Gentoku Omuro (murder, sentenced to 110 years), pop singer Hanaka Ichirin (murder and attempted murder, sentenced to 18 years), and Benitaro "Allan Poe Akechi" Barahabara (disturbing the peace, sentenced to two months) all mysteriously awake on board a ship transporting the group to the island of Yurukill Land. All six profess innocence for the crimes and claim erroneous convictions. Also on the ship are five mostly eccentric civilians who have not been convicted of a crime and invited to the island on their own resolve: Rina Azami (paired with Sengoku), Kagura Kagutsuchi (paired with the Yamada twins), Izane Akegarasu (paired with Gentoku), Keiichi Oka (paired with Hanaka, whom his is a super fan of), and Beniko 'Kristina Kobayashi' Barahabara (paired with her older brother Allan Poe Akechi).

On the island, modeled after an amusement park, Binko, a woman donning a fox mask, informs the group that they have been brought to Yurukill Land to participate in a competition. The winning team will have the convict's criminal record erased, with the civilian being granted a wish as a prize. The convicts are to take the role of 'prisoners' while their civilian teammates are 'executioners'. Binko informs the participants that as teams progress through the games' challenges, executioners will have the ability to determine the guilt of their prisoner counterparts, resulting in either a pardon or the execution of their teammate. This judgement can occur at any point but is also to happen at the end of each challenge.

The teams are individually transported to a unique attraction which they must solve independent of the other groups. As the teams progress, they come to find that each challenge is modelled after the crime they were convicted of, and information is contained which either supports their claim to innocence or reveals that the prisoner team member committed the offence. As each attraction progresses, each executioner also reveals that they are not random citizens, but the surviving victims of their partners convicted crimes (Rina the sole survivor of the arson, Kagura the granddaughter of a murdered couple, Izane the sole survivor of a village massacre instigated by Gentoku, and Keiichi the survivor of a stabbing). While the attractions do not concretely prove the guilt of either Sengoku or the Yamada twins, Gentoku's scenario uncovers that his real name is Kazuki Jimbo while Izane is his cousin Chihiro Jimbo; the two are the only survivors of a massacre which killed every other member of the Jimbo family, while Hanaka's attraction contains indisputable video evidence that she murdered a man and also stabbed Keiichi. Ultimately, the four executioners pardon their prisoner teammates, though under different rationales (Rina has doubts as to Sengoku's innocence, Kagura is promised devout loyalty by Futa, Izane desires Genotku's real life power, while Keiichi's obsessiveness of Hanaka allows him to forgive her). Allan Poe's team completes an attraction offscreen.

As all teams completed their attraction without an execution occurring, a murder-mystery competition is held, with the first two teams to solve the mystery's earning a spot in the Yurukill finals. Ultimately, Gentoku/Azame and Allan Poe/Kristina earn a spot in the finals, however, after Allan Poe's team goes missing, a follow up competition is held, with Sengoku and Rina instead participating in the finals.

Alongside the broader competition which is occurring, Senogku is attempting to determine the culprit behind the arson and murders which he was framed for. Spurred by a taunting message which was slipped into his cell on the boat at the start of the games, he and Rina eventually determine that the culprit is a player.

In the finals, additional evidence presented by the attraction setup allows Sengoku and Rina to conclude that Izane is the true culprit behind the crimes which all the prisoners have been accused of, either through committing them directly and framing a prisoner, or instigation. Izane (an anagram of the '冤罪' (Enzai, lit. 'false accusation')) is also revealed to be the true convict of Jimbo family massacre which Gentoku is participating as a prisoner for (switching places with the amnesiac Gentoku discretely at the very start) and also an employee of Yurukill Inc., a powerful covert organization which broadcasts the Yurukill games for profit on the internet. In the final showdown between Sengoku and Izane, Allan Poe's missing team returns, freeing the other prisoners and hacking into the Yurukill computers systems to allow the games' participants to defeat Izane. As the winners of the Yurukill Games, Sengoku's conviction is erased, while Rina's winning wish is to have Izane turned into the police with the evidence Yurukill Inc. has, which can allow the others to be retried and freed. However, Izane jumps off a nearby cliff edge upon her defeat, committing suicide.

In the epilogue, the prisoners are retried and all acquitted of their charges. Futa and Raita start a business with Kagura as an employee; Hanaka hires Keiichi as a manager and returns to her singing career; Gentoku, assuming his birth name Kazuki Jimbo, returns to the Jimbo family village to honour his deceased family, while Sengoku and Rina become close friends. A post-credits scene features Binko discussing the financial success of the Yurukill Games, slowly taking off her mask to tease that she is Izane.

== Gameplay ==

The fusion of game genres can be seen in these contrasting gameplay sections from Chapter 1, including a visual novel portion (top) and a shoot 'em up section (bottom).

Yurukill features a fusion of gameplay genres typically not seen in other video games, combining both visual novel and vertically scrolling shoot 'em up elements. The story mode primarily takes the form of a visual novel. Like other visual novels, players will progress through the plot either reading or listening to text on screen, (Note: Although fully voice acted, the audio is only available in Japanese.) occasionally making dialogue choices which may influence how characters will react to the player in that moment. During the attraction sequences, players are able to move a cursor over a static environmental images to interact with objects in the space, which can progress the story or allow items to be picked up and stored for later use. Puzzles will need to be solved while in the attractions, with these occurring in a similar manner of moving the cursor to interact with or place items in a particular sequence. A hint system is available which offers up to three clues to the player during a puzzle, at no penalty for use. While navigating the attraction sequences, players will need to alternate between rooms to advance the story. Although gameplay in the visual novel sequences is largely linear and takes the form of mostly static imagery, the character portraits and text boxes feature minor animations. Text is advanced with the press of a button, and can also be either fast forwarded or auto-advanced at the press of a button.

Near the end of each chapter in the story mode, after an attraction has been completed, characters will enter the 'BR' (brain reality) system (akin to a virtual reality space) for judgement, either by the executioner or another character of note, at which point the title transitions to a shoot 'em up. Players control an aerial ship from an overhead perspective over a 2D space, automatically advancing upwards in a vertical direction. Opposing ships will conversely scroll from the top of the screen towards the bottom, firing projectiles which will kill the player instantly upon contact and subtract one life. Players are able to fire projectiles of their own at enemy ships, using both light and heavier attacks (which will cause decreased movement speed). Although some opponents will perish in one hit themselves, several boast life bars which will require several hits before being defeated. Powerups are scattered through the levels which will allow increased attack power. Upon defeat, enemy ships drop energy which can be collected to boost the players energy meter. Once a select percentage of the energy bar is collected, advanced techniques become available to the player. On easy and normal difficulties, filling the gauge to at least 20% will allow the player to automatically absorb a shot without dying, at the cost of reducing the energy total to 0 upon defeat. Using energy also allows for the firing of both an advanced shot or a bomb which also removed enemy projectiles which come in contact with it. In total, there are seven levels each boasting three stages each, with a boss being fought at the end of each stage. Score is collecting during gameplay and tallied at the end of a stage during a results stage, and the game features three difficulty levels: easy, medium, and Hell. Each stage also features a hidden Binko token which will require the player to use an energy attack to allow for its collection, who will be subsequently rewarded with an extra live upon successful contact. Each of the four playable characters can be piloted in the BR sections, with unique attacks and play styles present depending on who is selected.

The shoot 'em up portions may be played outside of story mode via the main menu, although they must first be encountered in the story to become available for free play. In the 'all attack' mode, players play through the 21 total stages in chronological order of story appearance with their character of choice. Once all lives are lost, scores may be uploaded to a global leaderboard to allow for international competition. In the 'practice' mode, players may select any level of choice to begin play on, and other adjustable features such as the number of lives available during the session.

== Development and release ==
Yurukill was jointly developed by Japanese studios IzanagiGames and G.rev. IzanagiGames developed the visual novel portions, while G.rev, experienced with games in the shoot 'em up genre, handled the title's shooter portions. The game was formally revealed in a Japanese language press release by IzaniGames on September 11, 2019, and made an appearance at Konami's booth during Tokyo Game Show the following day, which featured a playable demo. On September 13, the two studios held a conference at the show which featured appearances and commentary from both studio executives and talent involved in the game's development, spoken over a gameplay demonstration which was simultaneously livestreamed on YouTube. The game's story was based on a concept from Homura Kawamoto, known for his creation of Kakegurui. At the time of announcement, the title was only revealed to be in development for PlayStation 4 and personal computers. Originally scheduled for release in 2020, the title was delayed to 2021 to further refine the script, before further being delayed to 2022. On December 4, 2020, alongside the announcement that the game would be delayed to 2021, it was also revealed that the title would release on Nintendo Switch and PlayStation 5 in addition to the original hardware announcements. NIS America announced a localization of the game for international markets on September 31, 2021, with an anticipated launch of Spring 2022, although the Windows release would still be published by IzanagiGames. On February 4, 2022, it was announced that the game would once again be delayed by roughly a month in all regions for additional quality control.

The game's soundtrack was composed by Yuko Komiyama, who had previous experience in the video game industry composing music for Monster Hunter Tri. The title's official score consists of 45 official tracks totaling 3 hours 16 minutes in length. Two songs with vocal accompaniments, a main theme 'Black Innocence', and an ending theme, 'Onore ni Hanamuke' (English: 'A Parting Gift'), sung in character by Rina and Izane, were produced for the soundtrack, with the former being sung by each respective character's in game voice actors: the former Saori Hayami and the latter by Akari Kito. Tomomichi Takeoka produced the string arrangements for the two songs featuring vocalists. The game's soundtrack was released to global music streaming services, including Spotify and Apple Music on July 15, 2022, while the two songs with vocal performances were also each released independently as physical CDs for the price of ¥1,300 before Japanese sales tax.

Yurukill had a publicly downloadable demo released in Japan on April 28, which enabled prospective buys to sample a portion of the title before being ultimately released domestically on May 26, 2022 for PlayStation 4, PlayStation 5, and Nintendo Switch, with a Microsoft Windows port arriving on July 8 via Steam. In Japan, all versions were self-published by co-developer IzanagiGames, and those who pre-ordered a physical copy receiving a complementary 51 minute long drama CD set before the events of the game entitled 'The Yurukill Games Prequel: Binko’s Undercover Bin-filtration Report!'. In other Asian territories, the game was published by Arc System Works on the same day as the Japanese launch.

In North America and PAL regions, the game was published by NIS America. In anticipation of the game's international release, a demo was made available for download on June 7, 2022 and officially released on July 5 and July 8, 2022, respectively. For western audiences, NIS produced two physical editions. The standard physical release, titled the 'Deluxe edition', included a download voucher for select songs from the game's soundtrack and a brief artbook alongside a copy of the game. A collector's edition was also released exclusively on NIS' online store, which alongside the game included an expanded hardcover artbook, a CD of the soundtrack, an acrylic stand of the Binko character, a pin, a poster, and a collector's box. Digital versions were also release on each console's online storefronts, while the Windows version was released as a Steam download in all markets.

Several pieces of promotional merchandise were released, largely isolated to the Japanese market. Examples of novelty items available for purchase included Yurukill branded tapestries, keychains, and towels, among other products. Two novelizations, based on the same plot as the game, were also released in Japan in both physical and digital version, and a stage adaption by director Eima Yamada and starring Hiroki Ino was performed at Nissho Hall in Tokyo from April 23 to May 1, 2022.

== Reception ==
Reception

Aggregate score
Aggregator	Score
Metacritic	NSW: 72/100; PS5: 70/100

Review scores
Publication	Score
Destructoid	7/10
Digital Trends	3/5 stars
Famitsu	32/40
Hardcore Gamer	4/5 stars
Nintendo Life	7/10
Play	7/10
Push Square	7/10
TouchArcade	3.5/5

Yurukill received "mixed or average reviews" according to review aggregator website Metacritic.

Praise was generally given to the title's unique premise, combining the distinct genres of visual novel and shoot 'em-up into one narrative package, although some critics were more mixed as to the execution of each section. Reviewers generally also enjoyed the game's soundtrack and characters. Yurukill's storytelling drew mixed reception. While some enjoyed the plot, many notes similarities to the Danganronpa and Zero Escape series', with some commenting that Yurukill never matches the malicious storytelling and tones found in the prior two series, a fact which disappointed critics.

When initially released in Japan, Famitsu's four reviewers each awarded the game a score of 8/10, for a collective total of 32/40. A few weeks later in the June 2, 2022 issue, Yurukill entered the Golden Hall of Fame in the New Game Cross Review of Famitsu.

=== Sales ===
Yurukill's Nintendo Switch version debuted as the estimated 25th best selling title in Japan for the week of May 23–May 29, 2022, selling an estimated 1,261 copies. Other versions of the game did not chart among the top 30 best selling software titles for the week.
