= The Ninja Warriors (1994 video game) =

1994 SNES game

- Developer: Natsume Co., Ltd.
- Publishers: JP/NA: Taito; EU: Titus
- Designer: Shunichi Taniguchi
- Programmer: Toshiyasu Miyabe
- Artists: Shunichi Taniguchi; Takashi Shinpo; Shinya Wada
- Composer: Hiroyuki Iwatsuki
- Platform: Super NES
- Release: JP: January 28, 1994; NA: February 1994; EU: April 1995
- Genre: Beat 'em up
- Mode: Single-player

The Ninja Warriors (Note: The game was titled The Ninja Warriors Again in Japan. In western coverage, the game was primarily referred to as The Ninja Warriors although the European box art reads Ninja Warriors: The New Generation) is a beat 'em up video game developed by Natsume Co., Ltd. for the Super Nintendo Entertainment System and published by Taito in Japan and North America in 1994 and by Titus in Europe in 1995. It is a follow-up to Taito's 1987 arcade game of the same title, and shares similar gameplay. The player can choose between playing as one of three ninja androids, each with different attributes and a unique set of moves including jumps, dashes, throws, and other attacks. The game was developed by the same team at Natsume that later developed Wild Guns (1994).

The game was generally well received by critics. They compared the quality of The Ninja Warriors to Neo Geo and arcade games, and they felt the game had tight controls and vibrant graphics. Some reviewers disagreed on the quality of several aspects including the difficulty, sound quality, and how well the game distinguished itself among the myriad of beat 'em up games. An enhanced remaster titled The Ninja Saviors: Return of the Warriors (Note: Titled The Ninja Warriors Once Again in Japan.) was released in 2019.

== Gameplay ==
Kunoichi kicking an enemy after jumping in the air (Japanese version)

The Ninja Warriors is a beat 'em up game that plays in a side-scrolling manner similar to the 1987 arcade version. The player can choose to play as one of three androids with ninja skills: the slow but powerful "Ninja" armed with a nunchaku, the quick but weak "Kamaitachi" with sickles on his arms, or the balanced "Kunoichi" who wields knives and swords. Per the story, the androids were built by a rebel faction to help them overthrow the tyrant Banglar ruling over their nation. After a sudden attack by Banglar's forces, the rebels had to release the androids to fight, untested.

The player can move along a single plane, with the stages typically going in a linear direction and ending with a boss. Each character has a different set of moves which include speed dashes, jumps, grabs, blocks, and a variety of attack moves. There is a power meter that increases slowly with time that, when full, lets the player trigger a powerful attack that damages all enemies on the screen. The meter drains completely if the player is knocked to the ground. Some items, such as motorcycles and large safes, can be picked up and tossed at enemies. The environments occasionally introduce hazards that can hurt the player as well as enemies, such as mine fields or armed helicopters. The Ninja Warriors has eight stages and unlimited continues. The player character can be changed when using a continue.

== Plot ==
In a dystopian future, the world is dominated by a dictatorial regime ruled by a dwarfish mutant-cyborg man who calls himself "Banglar the Tyrant", who commands an army of brainwashed human soldiers, vicious mutants and non-sentient combat robots. For years, he has ruled the global superpower unchallenged, until a rebel army rises up against him, led by a human named Mulk.

Unable to defeat Banglar and his mutant armies using conventional weapons and fearing the World Government's forces are closing in on them, Mulk's rebel army decides to make one last effort to overthrow Banglar by sending a trio of self-aware combat androids styled after Japanese ninja to assassinate him.

In the end, the androids manage to reach Banglar's fortress, fighting through his army and ultimately killing Banglar himself; as a safety measure, explosives carried within the androids' bodies then detonate, both assuring Banglar's death and eliminating any possible threat to the new regime posed by the powerful androids' still experimental programming. Several months later, Mulk becomes the new President of the World Government. The development of autonomous combat androids continues under Mulk, soon making his military far stronger than Banglar's old forces, and Mulk ends up just as much of a tyrant as the fallen Banglar.

== Development and release ==
The Ninja Warriors was developed by Natsume Co., Ltd., specifically the same team that later developed Wild Guns (1994). The team consisted of three core members: game designer and artist Shunichi Taniguchi, programmer Toshiyasu Miyabe, and composer Hiroyuki Iwatsuki. Gaming journalists have deemed it both a remake and sequel of the 1987 arcade original from Taito. The original game was one of Taito's most popular arcade games and set a standard for beat 'em ups.

The game was first released on January 28, 1994, in Japan, published by Taito as The Ninja Warriors Again. (Note: ザ・ニンジャウォーリアーズアゲイン or ザ・ニンジャウォーリアーズ AGAIN.) Taito localized the game for a release in North America around February that same year, and Titus published the game in Europe in April 1995. The western localizations featured minor censorship, replacing some female ninja enemies with small male creatures. All regional versions of The Ninja Warriors have since become valuable collector's items.

== Reception ==
Reception

Review scores
Publication	Score
Electronic Gaming Monthly	8.2/10 (Note: Average of five individual reviewer scores of 8, 8, 8, 8, and 9.)
Famitsu	29/40
GameFan	90/100 (Note: Average of four individual reviewer scores of 87, 86, 93, and 92.)
GamePro	4.25/5 (Note: Average of component scores of 4.5 for graphics, 4 for sound, 4 for control, and 4.5 for "fun factor".)
MAN!AC	61%
Mega Fun	72%
Play Time	69%
Player One	85%
Super Play	84%

The Ninja Warriors received generally positive reviews. Critics matched its quality to that of Neo Geo and arcade games, and some wrote that the game was better than the original arcade version. GameFan called it Taito's best game to date, and the best game of its kind on the SNES. Electronic Gaming Monthly called it "the best side-scrolling fighting game yet."

Two aspects of the gameplay that were highlighted by multiple critics were the tight and responsive controls, and the variety of each character's moves. GamePro wrote that it borrowed defensive techniques and interesting offensive combos from fighting games, all of which help set The Ninja Warriors apart from other beat 'em ups. Some believed that the game lacked innovation, and instead fell into a pattern of repetitive gameplay. In this regard, Mega Fan wrote that the game did not do enough to distinguish itself from Final Fight (1989). Player One and GameFan disagreed, writing that game stands out and keeps the player's interest more than most Final Fight clones. The game's level of challenge was both praised as fair, and criticized as too easy. GamePro wished the game was more difficult, believing it would be easy for veterans of fighting games, and only an intermediate challenge for others. Some other recurring complaints were the lack of a two-player cooperative mode and the game's short length.

Nearly all aspects of the game's graphics were praised, including the colors, shading, backgrounds, animation, and large sprites. Player One wrote that the graphics were arcade quality, and the animations were as good as Street Fighter. GameFan wrote that The Ninja Warriors looked like a Neo Geo game, and felt that only the arcade game The Punisher (1993) rivaled its smooth animation. Some believed the sound and music were also of high quality, but they were criticized by others. Super Play wrote that "the only thing worth criticizing about this game is the sound", and complained about the weak grunt noises coming from enemies when they are hit.

Retrospective reviews have continued to be positive. Retro Gamer wrote that its variety and presentation make The Ninja Warriors one of the best beat 'em ups. AllGame felt that the game's components were not noteworthy individually, but that it was greater than the sum of its parts, calling it "an old-school, side-scrolling fighter done right." GameFan felt that the game was "unapologetic in its assimilation of the genre standards. If it wasn't so pretty, it's likely we would hold that against it." Both Hardcore Gaming 101 and GameFan cited the game's lack of cooperative gameplay as one of its biggest weaknesses. The female ninja Kunoichi has gained some recognition. Electronic Gaming Monthly listed her among their list of "Top Ten Fighting Women", and GamesRadar+ listed her among the best ninja assassins in video games.

== Remaster ==
The original core staff that developed The Ninja Warriors, known today as Natsume Atari's team Tengo Project, developed an enhanced remaster for the PlayStation 4 and Nintendo Switch. The game was released by Taito in July 2019 in Japan. A Microsoft Windows version was later released in July 2023. It is titled The Ninja Warriors Once Again in Japan and The Ninja Saviors: Return of the Warriors internationally. It was released by Arc System Works in Asia and by Strictly Limited Games in Europe. An early playable demo was showcased alongside the SNES original at Tokyo Game Show 2018.

The remaster enhances the game's graphics and adds new gameplay elements, similar to the team's previous remaster of Wild Guns. The game includes re-drawn graphics, "16:9" widescreen support, a local two-player cooperative mode, and optional music from the arcade and SNES games. There are two new playable characters: a very short female ninja with extending arms named "Yaksha" and a colossal mechanized shinobi referred to as "Raiden".
