= WarTech: Senko no Ronde =

2005 video game

- Developer: G.rev
- Publishers: Arcade: JP: Sega; Xbox 360: JP: G.rev; NA: Ubisoft; EU: Ubisoft
- Designer: Hiroyuki Maruyama (director)
- Composer: Yasuhisa Watanabe
- Platforms: Arcade, Xbox 360
- Release: Arcade: JP: April 26, 2005; Xbox 360: JP: July 27, 2006; NA: May 29, 2007; EU: June 8, 2007; AU: May 31, 2007
- Genre: Fighting/Shooter
- Modes: Single-player, Multiplayer
- Arcade system: Sega NAOMI

WarTech: Senko no Ronde (旋光の輪舞 Rev.X, Senkō no Rondo Ribijon Ekkusu) is a fighting and shoot 'em up video game developed by G.rev. Originally released in Japanese arcades as Senkō no Rondo (旋光の輪舞) in 2005 for the Sega NAOMI arcade platform, it was ported to the Xbox 360 in 2006. The Xbox 360 port features enhanced graphics, a more concise story for each character, and network play. It was localized for American and European markets in 2007, published by Ubisoft.

In 2010, a sequel entitled Senko no Ronde: Dis-United Order was released for the Xbox 360 exclusively in Japan, which has many new features, a larger cast and more extensive story mode. A reboot of Dis-United Order, titled Senko no Ronde 2, was released for PlayStation 4 and Microsoft Windows in 2017.

== Plot ==
Due to a past catastrophe on Earth, humanity was forced to live among the stars for several centuries, leading to the creation of the S.D. calendar and the birth of the Aria Federation, an empire whose influence extends from Earth to Saturn. In S.D. 1478, an embassy located in the empire's capital on Earth's moon was seized by terrorists. The forces deployed by Aria's Special Space Service ended in disaster when the terrorists triggered a self-detonation device, killing themselves and several civilians in the process.

The actual game begins six years after this event, with the player assuming the role of one of eight characters who will become involved in a mastermind's scheme to take control of the Aria Federation's superweapon and use it for his own purposes.

Toward the Terra, a science fiction series created by Keiko Takemiya, has played a major influence for both Senko no Ronde's story and art style.

== Gameplay ==
Two players fight each other from top-down and isometric perspectives using giant robots called Rounders. The game can be described as a fighter/shmup mashup, with elements of 2D fighters mixed with modern top-down shooters. It is very similar to Psychic Force, a unique, heavily projectile-based fighting game developed at Taito while G.rev's founders worked there. Unlike Psychic Force, however, it offers even more elaborate firing patterns that conjure a danmaku shooter aesthetic. This is further reinforced by "B.O.S.S. Mode," a super attack that allows players to transform into screen-filling boss ships that can fill the screen with bullets. It may also be likened to "a 2D version of Virtual On" mixed with shmup boss encounters and modern danmaku patterns. Due to its close ties with Virtual On's mechanics, several of its strategies can also be applied to this game as well.

Each character in Senko no Ronde boasts unique weapons, bullet patterns, and game play styles, each have two variations called Cartridge A and Cartridge B which have slightly modified stats and weapon properties. All characters have a main weapon and sub weapon, as well as 3-4 special attacks called "Barrages", which are activated via command inputs similar to 2D fighters. When matches start players are given two "B.O.S.S. Stock" which lets a player switch to a larger robot called "B.O.S.S. Mode", which is comparable to a boss ship in standard shmups. In Boss Mode a player has increased firepower and will regain a portion of health, but movement is more restricted, only one boss form can be activated at a time. Upon losing a match you will regain one Boss Stock. If your character's health bar is depleted they will enter a special state called "Vanish Mode" which reduces the size of the characters hitbox, but if one more shot connects you will lose the round. Using a Boss Stock well in Vanish Mode will result in using a more powerful Boss Mode, called "Final Boss" Mode, which has benefits such as additional firepower or more mobility. Final Boss mode also has access to an extra powerful super attack.

== Reception ==
Reception

Aggregate scores
Aggregator	Score
GameRankings	61.48%
Metacritic	60/100

Review scores
Publication	Score
1Up.com	5/10
Eurogamer	8/10
Game Informer	3.75/10
GameSpot	5.2/10
GamesRadar+	2/5
GameZone	5/10
IGN	5.1/10
Official Xbox Magazine (US)	6/10
X-Play	2/5

The Xbox version of WarTech: Senko no Ronde received mixed or average reviews.

Reception of the game was generally mixed, with several sources complaining that its short length and relatively insubstantial content, coupled with its full price tag, made it not worth its full retail price. The title quickly dropped to a sixth of its original price after its release in the US. Hyper's Maurice Branscombe commends the game for being a "successful melding of shooter and fighter and its great weapon effects". However, he criticises it for its "limited single player, melee needed work and its price tag".

== Sequels ==
=== Senko no Ronde: Dis-United Order ===
Senko No Ronde: Dis-United Order
- Developer: G.rev
- Publishers: Arcade: JP: Taito Corporation; Xbox 360: JP: G.rev
- Platforms: Arcade, Xbox 360
- Release: Arcade: JP: July 28, 2009; Xbox 360: JP: May 20, 2010
- Genre: Fighting/Shooter
- Modes: Single-player, Multiplayer
- Arcade system: Taito Type X2

On May 20, 2010, G.rev released Senko no Ronde: Dis-United Order (Senko no Ronde: DUO for short) in Japan for the Xbox 360, it features many new characters, assist attacks, updated mechanics and a larger more fleshed out story mode, and the ability to save replays. Senko no Ronde: DUO was released in both a standard edition, as well as a Limited Edition version which featured special box art and contained a bonus Drama CD. The game features 14 characters, each with two cartridge variations, and 12 assist characters which can be called on briefly during battles. Shortly after launch G.Rev released ver.2.00EX update which brought back two characters from the previous game, Ernula and Sakurako. The ver.2.00EX update also allowed characters and assist to be mixed and matched, as well fixed several glitches. Game play in Senko no Ronde: DUO is known for being noticeably faster than WarTech: Senko no Ronde, but retains most of the same strategies and mechanics from previous games. The game also has a new control option called Commander Style, which lets you indirectly control the Rounder through selectable commands. Currently G.rev has yet to announce any plans for release outside Japan.

June 18, 2010, G.rev released its first DLC which includes a free story scenario as well as extra story scenarios retailing between 60MSP and 180MSP. July 29, 2010, saw release of another free story scenario, as well a collection which contains 32 songs from Senko no Ronde Rev.X which retails for 400MSP. At the end of August, G.rev halted its future DLC plans sighting that the episodic content has proved unprofitable with respect to its creation cost. G.rev apologized saying to fans saying they hope to distribute episodic content in another manner.

April 26, 2011, G.Rev updated Senko no Ronde: DUO to Version 2.2, adjusting Ursure, Cuilan, Jasper, Fabian, Mika, and Ernula. The game was also added to Japan's Games on Demand service for 2,940 yen.

=== Senko no Ronde: Dis-United Order for NESiCAxLive ===
Senko No Ronde: Dis-United Order for NESiCAxLive
- Developer: G.rev
- Publisher: Arcade: JP: Taito Corporation
- Platform: Arcade
- Release: Arcade: JP: 2011-04-27
- Genre: Fighting/Shooter
- Modes: Single-player, Multiplayer
- Arcade system: Taito NESiCAxLive

It is a version of Senko no Ronde DUO Ver.2.3 for NESiCAxLive, which includes score attack mode.

=== Senko no Ronde for PlayStation Vita (working title) ===
On G.Rev's official broadcast on March 2, 2012, Hiroyuki Maruyama announced a new game in the Senko no Ronde series is currently in the works on the PlayStation Vita. The entry will be greatly different from previous entries and may not share the Senko no Ronde name. A 2013 release was planned for the game. However, no news has been shared since then, and it's considered vaporware today.

=== Touhou Genso Rondo: Bullet Ballet ===
Touhou Genso Rondo: Bullet Ballet
- Developer: CUBETYPE
- Publishers: JP: CUBETYPE; NA: NIS America; EU: NIS America; ESP: Bandai Namco Entertainment; TW: MediaScape
- Composers: Team Shanghai Alice; CUBETYPE
- Platforms: Microsoft Windows, PlayStation 4(Bullet Ballet)
- Release: Microsoft Windows: JP: August 11, 2012; PlayStation 4: JP: May 11, 2015; NA: September 6, 2016; EU: September 8, 2016; ESP: September 23, 2016; TW, KO: August 11, 2016
- Genre: Fighting/Shooter
- Modes: Single-player, Multiplayer

Touhou Genso Rondo is a Touhou Project fangame developed by the doujin circle CUBETYPE originally for Microsoft Windows. The game is completely based on the Senko no Ronde series with emphasis on bullet pattern dodging and memorization on a much more slower pace. The entire cast is now replaced with characters from the Touhou series, as well as locations of the arenas. Before the release of the PlayStation 4 version, CUBETYPE reached agreement with G.rev to license the game under their name due to G.rev owning the Senko no Ronde series.

The game was later announced as one of the Touhou fangames to receive a remastered version for the PlayStation 4 on September 1, 2014 as part of the Play, Doujin! project, which ports various doujin games to consoles to promote doujin gaming. The game was released digitally in Japan on May 11, 2015.

After a year, the game was then picked up by NIS America for localization to Western countries, under the title of "Touhou Genso Rondo: Bullet Ballet" and was released in North America and Europe on September 6, 2016 and September 9, 2016, respectively. It was the first Touhou game to be localized and released outside of Japan.

The plot of the original PC version simply revolves around the series protagonist, Reimu Hakurei, having the problem of not having any visitors to the Hakurei Shrine than she used to, thus, she flies off trying to find anything that might've caused the shortage of visitors to her shrine while beating everyone she deemed suspicious. The PlayStation 4 version gives all characters, including DLC characters, their own stories, with the story of the PC version being Reimu's story with alterations. The common theme of every story revolves on the daily lives of various Touhou characters while solving their own little problems with encounters with familiar faces that usually ends up in battle.

The game was panned and received mixed to negative reviews to critics, with the prominent flaws of the game are the lengthy in-depth tutorial, very few of single player content, the online being completely "dead" even after launch with few players rarely appearing, few characters, forgettable remixes of Touhou music themes and bland 3D backgrounds.

=== Senko no Ronde 2 ===
Senko no Ronde 2
- Developer: G.rev
- Publishers: JP: Kadokawa Games; WW: Komodo
- Director: Minoru Okamoto
- Producers: Hiroyuki Maruyama; Tsutomu Koganezawa
- Designer: Minoru Okamoto
- Programmer: Syunsuke Ono
- Artist: Akira Ito
- Writers: Hiroyuki Maruyama; Naruki Nakagawa
- Composer: Yasuhisa Watanabe
- Platforms: PlayStation 4 Microsoft Windows
- Release: WW: September 7, 2017
- Genre: Fighting/Shooter

Senko no Ronde 2 (Japanese: 旋光の輪舞2), subtitled Reassembly from "DUO" in Japan, is a reboot of Senko no Ronde DUO announced in April 2017 and was digitally released on September 7 for PlayStation 4 and Microsoft Windows, with a physical release for PlayStation 4 on April 13, 2018. Senko no Ronde 2 is a collaboration between G.rev and Kadokawa Games under their Chara-Ani division, who previously worked together on Dariusburst Chronicle Saviours after G.rev had taken over development from Pyramid in 2016. Like Dariusburst Chronicle Saviours, it has been published internationally by Degica.
