= Dino Rex =

1992 video game

- Japanese arcade flyer
- Developer: Taito
- Publisher: Taito
- Directors: Chiho Kimura; Takatsuna Senba
- Producers: Ichiro Fujisue; Masaki Ogata
- Designers: Naomitsu Abe; Yosuke Tsuda; Takaaki Tomita
- Programmers: Masahiro Okamoto; Takamasa Hori; Takayuki Shinma
- Artists: Masahiro Terakoshi; Masami Kikuchi; Tatsuya Ushiroda
- Composers: Hiroshige Tonomura; Y. Ohashi
- Platform: Arcade
- Release: JP: November 1992; EU: 1992
- Genre: Fighting
- Modes: Single-player, multiplayer}}
- Arcade system: Taito F2 System

Dino Rex (Note: Japanese: ダイノレックス, Hepburn: Dino Rekkusu) is a 1992 fighting video game developed and published by Taito for arcades. It was released in Japan in November 1992. Set during the 25th century BC on a prehistoric South America, players assume the role of a warrior commanding his dinosaur companion as he enters a tournament held by the current titular king to become the next ruler while facing matches against other rivals. Its gameplay consists of one-on-one fights with a three-button configuration, featuring special moves and combo techniques.

Produced under the working title "Project D-Rex", Dino Rex was created by most of the same team behind Gun Frontier and Metal Black, including director Takatsuna Senba and was originally intended to be a shoot 'em up game, but it was instead retooled into a fighting title due to the success of games like Capcom's 1991 Street Fighter II: The World Warrior. It uses stop motion animation for its dinosaur fighters, predating Atari Games' 1994 Primal Rage by two years.

Dino Rex has been met with negative reception from reviewers since its release, who criticized aspects such as the visuals, controls and difficulty.

== Gameplay ==
Arcade version screenshot.

Dino Rex is a fighting game featuring digitized sprites similar to Primal Rage and Reikai Dōshi, where the player battles against other opponents in one-on-one matches. The fighter who manages to deplete the health bar of the opponent wins the first bout and the first person to win two bouts becomes the winner of the match. Each round is timed and if both fighters still have health remaining when time expires, the fighter with more health wins the round. After winning a number of matches, players are induced into a dream sequence that acts as a bonus stage, where the main goal is to decimate a city in the present time.

When playing solo, players assume the role of a warrior, can choose from six playable dinosaurs and fight against computer-controlled fighters, with each one having their own special moves that are performed by entering button commands while moving the joystick. If all of the opponents are defeated, the player will be able to fight against the titular king in order to become the next ruler. A notable feature is the ability to restore health by holding up. Another notable gameplay feature is the power meter, which can be increased three times in a row to perform combos. If the player loses two bouts in a row, the game is over unless more credits are inserted into the arcade machine to continue playing.

== Synopsis ==
=== Plot ===
Dino Rex begins in the present day, where archaeologists unearthed clay figures of a man riding a dinosaur on ruins located in South America. This indicated that both man and dinosaurs coexisted together in a world controlled by Amazones, where men from multiple tribes fought for a queen once a year. One of them who proved that his dinosaur companion was much stronger than those from his opponents managed to obtain the queen and eventually become the titular king. Players assume the role of a warrior commanding his dinosaur as he enters a tournament held by the current king in order to become the next ruler by facing other rivals before arriving at the Auyán-tepui for the last match.

=== Dinosaurs ===
- Allosaurus
- Ceratosaurus
- Tyrannosaurus
- Triceratops
- Monoclonius
- Pachycephalosaurus
- Stygimoloch

== Development and release ==
Dino Rex was created by most of the same team behind Gun Frontier and Metal Black at Taito, including director Takatsuna Senba and was originally intended to be a helicopter-themed shoot 'em up game. However, due to the success of games like Street Fighter II: The World Warrior from Capcom, the project was retooled into a fighting title instead under the working name "Project D-Rex". Senba and his team made use of hand-drawn animations and graphics, as well as crafted model figures of the dinosaur fighters that were then filmed through the process of stop motion animation, preceding Primal Rage by Atari Games by two years.

Dino Rex was initially only launched for the arcades by Taito in 1992 across Japan and Europe. The game was re-released only in Japan as part of the compilation Taito Memories II Jōkan for the PlayStation 2 on January 25, 2007.

In April 2023, Taito announced that Dino Rex would be one of the games included in the Taito Milestones 2 collection set to release in Japan in August 2023. Hamster Corporation released the game as part of their Arcade Archives series for the Nintendo Switch and PlayStation 4 in November 2023.

== Reception ==
Dino Rex has garnered negative reception from reviewers in recent years. Kurt Kalata of Hardcore Gaming 101 heavily panned the complicated gameplay and controls, while feeling mixed in regards to the presentation and visuals. Joseph Shaffer of HonestGamers criticized its controls and high difficulty curve.
