= Dariusburst =

2009 video game

- Developer: Pyramid
- Publisher: Taito
- Director: Junichi Kashiwagi
- Producer: Hiroshi Aoki
- Artists: Kanetake Ebikawa; Takayuki Yanase; Kazuhiko Kakoi; Fumikane Shimada
- Composers: Shohei Tsuchiya; Hirokazu Koshio
- Series: Darius
- Platforms: PlayStation Portable: Dariusburst PlayStation Portable; Another Chronicle Arcade; Second Prologue iOS, Android; Chronicle Saviours PlayStation 4, PlayStation Vita, Microsoft Windows; Another Chronicle EX+ Nintendo Switch, PlayStation 4
- Release: December 24, 2009: PlayStation Portable; JP: December 24, 2009; Arcade; JP: December 17, 2010; iOS; WW: February 10, 2012; Android; JP: May 1, 2012; NA: October 24, 2015; PlayStation 4; NA: December 2, 2015; EU: December 8, 2015; AU: December 8, 2015; JP: January 14, 2016; PlayStation Vita; NA: November 30, 2015; EU: December 8, 2015; AU: December 8, 2015; JP: January 14, 2016; Microsoft Windows; WW: December 3, 2015; JP: January 14, 2016
- Genre: Horizontal scrolling shooter
- Mode: Single-player

Dariusburst (Note: Japanese: ダライアスバースト, Hepburn: Daraiasubāsuto) is a horizontal scrolling shooter developed by Pyramid and published by Taito. Forming part of the Darius series, it was released for the PlayStation Portable on December 24, 2009. Like previous Darius games, Dariusburst is an offbeat sci-fi shooter set in outer space with aquatic-themed (typically fish-shaped) robotic enemies. In keeping with tradition, the game also features branching paths instead of the linear progression found in most games of the genre. There are a total of 11 zones in the game, with 5 stages per run.

A related arcade game, titled Dariusburst Another Chronicle, was released in December 2010. An update, Dariusburst Another Chronicle EX, was released in 2011. An enhanced port of the original game for iOS and Android devices, titled Dariusburst Second Prologue, was released on February 10, 2012, and on October 24, 2015 in North America. An enhanced port of Another Chronicle, titled Dariusburst Chronicle Saviours, was released for PlayStation 4, PlayStation Vita, and Microsoft Windows (through Steam) in December 2015.

== Plot ==
Dariusburst takes place a century after Darius II where the planet Darius is continually attacked by the Belser Army. The continuing battles show a possible end to the long wars on Darius, particularly with the development of the Burst System, a powerful new weapon equipped with the latest Silver Hawk fighters. Using this new weapon system are pilots Riga Pratica, test pilot of the Silver Hawk Burst series; and Ti2, a computer AI assuming the body of a young girl. Together, the pilots fight back against the Belser Army's fleets, factories, and even its previously inhabited fortresses.

== Gameplay ==
The gameplay and flow maintains the consistency of previous Darius games: players fight the Belsar Army through several stages and can choose to fight in different zones along different paths, ultimately reaching a different final boss and ending. Players can upgrade the firepower of their Silver Hawk space fighter with power-ups that affect the ship's main firepower, secondary missiles and shield as well as additional power-ups that add to the player's score, extends or destroy every enemy on screen. The main differences include ship selection, the Burst System and the effect of weapons on enemy fire.

Players have three types of main firepower to upgrade, starting with Missile, Laser and ending in Wave Shot. As the ship receives further upgrades, the weapon placement will move up from Missile to Laser and Wave. Many enemies throughout the game use similar shots, and the player can destroy enemy shots depending on what they are. When using the Missile Shot, the Silver Hawk can destroy enemy missile shots and the same effect stands with Laser shots. The Wave shot is consistent throughout the Darius series in its ability to fire through solid foreground objects.

The Burst System allows the player to unleash a powerful beam attack that can be positioned to fire in several directions. By tapping and holding the appropriate fire button, players can direct the Burst beam in any forward firing direction. The player can also fire their main shot while the Burst Beam is going, but doing so will keep the Beam in a fixed position. The Burst System is unique in that it is recharged every time the Silver Hawk destroys something; whether it's an enemy ship, similar enemy shot or destructible object, the drained Burst meter will be replenished upon that object's destruction. However, the Belser Army has managed to reverse engineer the Burst System, allowing them access to this weapon for their larger battleships. Thus, similar to the Beam Duels of G-Darius and Metal Black, players can duel bosses armed with the Burst System.

The player can select one of eight different Silver Hawks in both Another Chronicle and Chronicle Saviours; in the original Dariusburst, three ships are usable: The Silver Hawk Legend, Next and Origin. The Legend is a standard Silver Hawk model that is able to use the Burst System, while the Next is physically redesigned and is equipped with homing missiles rather than air-to-ground bombs. The Origin on the other hand, is based on original Silver Hawk models, and thus lacks the Burst System; it uses the same loadout as the Silver Hawk from the original Darius. In Dariusburst SP, the Silver Hawk Assault uses homing bombs rather than air-to-ground bombs and deploys gravity bombs instead of a beam for its Burst. Both Another Chronicle and Chronicle Saviours introduce a new Burst Beam ship, the Formula Silver Hawk Burst, which uses a Burst Beam like Legend and Next but can only hit enemies with normal fire from a short distance; the Second Silver Hawk (which is based on Darius II), Gaiden Silver Hawk (which is based on Darius Gaiden and uses its Black Hole Bomb in place of a Burst Beam), and Genesis Silver Hawk (which is based on G-Darius and has similar beam-dueling mechanics to that game) are also available.

== Reception ==
Reception

Aggregate score
Aggregator	Score			
Aggregator	iOS	PC	PS Vita	PS4
Metacritic	76/100	80/100	N/A	80/100

Review scores
Publication	Score			
Publication	iOS	PC	PS Vita	PS4
Destructoid	N/A	6/10	N/A	N/A
Eurogamer	N/A	N/A	N/A	8/10
Famitsu	N/A	N/A	32/40	32/40
GameSpot	N/A	8/10	N/A	8/10
IGN	N/A	8.3/10	N/A	N/A
