= Mamorukun Curse! =

2008 video game

- Developers: G.rev; Gulti
- Publishers: G.rev (Xbox 360); CyberFront (PlayStation 3); UFO Interactive Games (PlayStation 3); City Connection (PC, Switch, PS5, XSX/S)
- Composer: Yousuke Yasui
- Platforms: Arcade; Xbox 360; PlayStation 3 Microsoft Windows; Nintendo Switch; PlayStation 5 Xbox Series X/S
- Release: Arcade: JP: July 30, 2008; Xbox 360: JP: June 25, 2009; PlayStation 3: JP: March 31, 2011; NA: July 16, 2013 (PSN); Windows, Switch, PS5, Xbox Series X/S: WW: 2025
- Genre: Vertical scrolling shooter
- Mode: Single-player
- Arcade system: Sega NAOMI

Mamorukun Curse! (Note: Japanese: まもるクンは呪われてしまった!, Hepburn: Mamoru-kun wa Norowarete Shimatta!; "Mamoru-kun Has Been Cursed!") is a shoot 'em up arcade game developed by G.rev and Gulti. The game was released for arcade in Japan on July 30, 2008. Mamorukun Curse! was later ported and released for the Xbox 360 in Japan on June 25, 2009. An enhanced port of the game was released exclusively for the PlayStation 3 in Japan on March 31, 2011, offering full high-definition widescreen support with two Xbox 360 DLC characters included for free, and a new "Meikai Katsugeki" mode. UFO Interactive Games localized and released the PS3 version as a digital download on July 16, 2013. Sony made this version available to play on additional platforms through its PlayStation Now streaming service on March 17, 2015.

The game was remastered for re-release in 2025 as Mamorukun ReCurse! for Microsoft Windows, PlayStation 5, Xbox Series X/S, and Nintendo Switch.

== Gameplay ==
The game puts the player in control of Mamoru in an overhead shooter. Different from most shooters, the scrolling is not forced. The player is able to move about as they please, although most movements end up being up and down.

The "curse" part of the title comes from a special "curse bomb" attack which uses a separate button from the standard shot. These bombs can be used both to destroy the enemies' bullets, and to "curse" them, making them more powerful but opening up chances for a higher score.

== Reception ==
Reception

Aggregate score
Aggregator	Score
Metacritic	PS3: 71/100

Review score
Publication	Score
GameSpot	7/10

Mamorukun Curse! received "mixed or average" reviews for the PlayStation 3 version according to review aggregator Metacritic.

== Legacy ==
City Connection and G.rev announced a sequel titled Mamorukun Curse! 2 on 26 September 2025, on the same day as the re-release of the original game.
