= Zuntata =

Japanese band

Zuntata ズンタタ
- Also known as: Taito Sound Team
- Genres: Synth-pop, abstract
- Years active: 1983–present
- Labels: Pony Canyon, Sony Music Entertainment
- Website: zuntata.jp

Zuntata (Note: Japanese: ズンタタ, Hepburn: Zuntata) is the "house band" of Japanese video game developer and publisher Taito. The band consists of sound director Katsuhisa Ishikawa, bassists Yu Shimoda and Shohei Tsuchiya, and drummer Masaki Mori. Zuntata is Taito's core sound department, and has become the collective name for the company's other sound production teams. The band has contributed to many of the company's franchises, including Darius, Groove Coaster, Arkanoid, and Space Invaders.

Zuntata's origins can be traced back to 1983, the year Taito established its sound division. The Zuntata name was employed in 1987, first used for the soundtrack for Darius. Zuntata's music was originally published by Pony Canyon, before these operations were moved in-house. Zuntata worked on several Taito arcade games, namely shoot 'em ups and rhythm games. The band also assisted in production of the X2000, a Taito-developed karaoke machine. After Taito was acquired by Square Enix in 2005, many of the band's members departed due to creative differences between them and executives, as Taito was shrinking its operations into becoming more of a game publisher and owner of video arcades.

Zuntata continues to produce music for Taito video games, working primarily on the Groove Coaster series. The band's music, a combination of abstract and synth-pop, has gotten attention from video game publications for its bizarre nature and strangeness. Both the band and its members have received awards, and its music has been published many times through albums and digital music storefronts such as iTunes and Spotify.
