= Darius II (video game) =

1989 video game

- Japanese arcade flyer
- Developer: Taito
- Publisher: Taito
- Director: Hidehiro Fujiwara
- Producer: Hidehiro Fujiwara
- Designers: Hidehiro Fujiwara; Takatsuna Senba
- Programmers: Akira Otsuki; Tatsuo Nakamura; Masashi Tsuzura; Shinji Soyano
- Artists: Masami Kikuchi; Takatsuna Senba; Hisakazu Kato
- Composer: Hisayoshi Ogura
- Series: Darius
- Platforms: Arcade, Mega Drive/Genesis, Game Boy, Super CD-ROM², Master System, Sega Saturn
- Release: September 1989: Arcade; JP: September 1989; EU: 1989; NA: 1989 Mega Drive/Genesis; JP: December 20, 1990; NA: 1991 Game Boy; JP: December 13, 1991 Master System; EU: 1992 Super CD-ROM²; JP: December 24, 1993 Saturn; JP: June 7, 1996; EU: 1996
- Genre: Scrolling shooter
- Modes: Single-player, multiplayer

Darius II (Note: Japanese: ダライアスII, Hepburn: Daraiasu Tsū), released outside Japan as Sagaia, is a 1989 horizontally scrolling shooter video game developed and published by Taito for arcades. It is a direct sequel to the 1987 title Darius. It was later released in Japan in 1991 for the Game Boy as well as non-Japanese ports. A remake was released for the PC Engine Super CD-ROM² as Super Darius II (Note: Japanese: スーパーダライアスII, Hepburn: Sūpā Daraiasu Tsū) in 1993.

== Gameplay ==
The game is set in the inner half of the Solar System, and has the same branching level structure as Darius. Similar to the first Darius game, Darius II was programmed for multiple screens; while a three-screen version like the original exists, Darius II is more commonly and generally represented as a two-screen game.

The red/green/blue powerups from the first game return, and have the same function, respectively. They provide upgrades to the "missile" main weapon, the "bomb" subweapon, and a shield to absorb damage. Two new powerups were added: a yellow powerup that adds a new "laser" main weapon which functions somewhat similarly to the bombs, and a rainbow powerup that grants one upgrade to all the players weapons. Acquiring these powerups and the upgrade path is vastly different from Darius. A formation of a specific enemy must be completely destroyed (and a formation may not have a powerup), and every single powerup now grants some kind of upgrade. Furthermore, the various weapons upgrade differently, though the shield upgrade is the same as before.

Another new feature in Darius II is the appearance of minibosses known as "captains"; large enemies that appear somewhere in the level before the main boss. In Darius II, these are all smaller versions of bosses from the first game, with similar abilities.

== Plot ==
Darius II takes place sometime after the first Darius game. The colonized planet Darius is recuperating from its invasion from the alien Belser Army thanks to that game's heroes Proco and Tiat. Darius' inhabitants have since situated themselves on the planet Olga while Darius' societies, architecture and attacked areas were being repaired. The space flight Headquarters established on Olga picks up an SOS signal coming from Earth, where the first colonists originated before colonizing Darius. The signal included the description of alien ships similar to those of the Belser Army. Suspecting these might be their remaining Earthling ancestors, the people of Darius sends both Proco Jr. and Tiat Young to help them.

== Ports ==
A Mega Drive conversion was released in Japan in 1990; it was later released for the Genesis in the United States and Brazil in 1991, where it was renamed Sagaia. Changes include a boss rush mode (via a code) and various modifications to levels and mechanics, such as the boss Steel Spine being moved to another level and the boss Killer Higia being replaced with a similar creation called Nehonojia. This conversion does not support two players, so the ability to choose between Proco Jr. and Tiat Young was added; Proco plays like normal, while Tiat starts every life off with one power level to each weapon.

A Master System conversion, developed by Natsume, was released in Europe and Brazil in 1992, also titled Sagaia. It is somewhat based on the Mega Drive port, and while Tiat Young and her abilities are still present (though even more limited), many zones (and thus bosses) have been completely removed.

The PC Engine Super CD-ROM² version was published by NEC Avenue and released in 1993 under the title Super Darius II. This version features an entirely new set of bosses, major changes to levels, and a fully arranged soundtrack including new songs.

In 1996, a port of the arcade version itself was released in Japan and Europe for the Sega Saturn, complete with two-player mode and stretchable wide screen modes. The arcade version is also available in the Japan-only Taito Memories series of emulation-based compilations.

The arcade version, as well as console versions of Darius II, was included in Darius Cozmic Collection for the Nintendo Switch on February 28, 2019, and the PlayStation 4 on March 5, 2020 in Japan, and worldwide three months later on June 16, 2020. It was also included as part of Taito Milestones 2 on August 31, 2023 in Japan for the Switch, and worldwide the following day. Hamster Corporation released the game as part of their Arcade Archives series for the Nintendo Switch and PlayStation 4 in October 2023.

== Reception ==
Reception

Review scores
Publication	Score
Consoles +	82% (Master System)
Commodore User	84% (Arcade)
Sega Master Force	46% (Master System)

In Japan, Game Machine listed Darius II as the sixth most successful upright/cockpit arcade unit of November 1989.
