= G-Darius =

1997 video game

- Arcade flyer
- Developer: Taito
- Publisher: Taito
- Series: Darius
- Platforms: Arcade; PlayStation; PlayStation 2 PlayStation 4 Nintendo Switch; Windows
- Release: Arcade: JP: June 1997; PlayStation: JP: April 9, 1998; NA: September 16, 1998; EU: September 18, 1998
- Genre: Scrolling shooter
- Modes: Single-player, multiplayer
- Arcade system: Taito FX-1B

G-Darius (Note: Japanese: Gダライアス, Hepburn: Jī-Daraiasu) is a horizontally scrolling shooter arcade video game released by Taito in 1997. It is the fourth arcade installment of the Darius series and the first with three-dimensional polygonal graphics. A port to the PlayStation was published as G Darius.

== Gameplay ==
Much like previous installments in the Darius series, G-Darius is a horizontally scrolling shooter. While the game uses three-dimensional polygonal graphics, the gameplay is two-dimensional. The player controls a spaceship named the Silver Hawk and must battle enemies and avoid obstacles throughout the game's stages (referred to as "zones" in the game). The ship is armed with forward-firing missiles, small aerial bombs, and a protective force field. These can be upgraded by power-ups, in the form of large orbs, that are dropped by specially-colored enemies when they are destroyed. When the player reaches the end of a zone, a boss appears, which must be defeated to proceed. Once the boss of a zone is destroyed, the player is given a choice of which zone to play next via a branching path. There are 15 zones in total, numbered using the Greek letters alpha to omicron, but the player only needs to complete five in a row to reach one of five alternative endings. Each level also has two alternative routes that the player can choose about halfway through. Some of these are duplicated in later stages but result in the bosses appearance and attack sequences being slightly different.

Among the player's arsenal is the 'capture ball', which the player can launch to capture enemies. Once captured, the enemy will follow and aid the player's ship. Each enemy contains a unique enhancement; some will act as extra turrets and others will act as shields. Additionally, the player can detonate their captured enemy as a bomb. The captured enemy will continue to follow the player until either they are destroyed after taking enough damage, the player's ship is destroyed or the player 'absorbs' them to utilize a special ability.

"Beam-dueling". The blue beam on the right is the player's.

New to the series is beam-dueling. The player can absorb a captured enemy to fire a powerful laser beam over a short period, which will instantly destroy nearly every enemy it comes into contact with. This is primarily used during boss fights. Every major boss in the game has an equivalent laser beam. If the player and the boss fire their lasers simultaneously, a 'duel' between the two will initiate. The player must overwhelm the boss' laser by repeatedly tapping the fire button as quickly as possible. If successful, the boss' beam will eventually dissipate and the player's beam will multiply in size (as well as in power) and severely damage, if not kill, the boss. Some bosses have multiple beams and if the player counters all of them, their own beam can multiply up to four times. Some enemies and large bullets are invulnerable to the beam, allowing bosses to shield themselves. Familiarity with a boss's attack patterns is thus vital for the successful use of the beam dueling mechanic.

An upgraded version of the game, G-Darius Ver. 2, added a beginner mode in which the player's power-up level goes down only one rank upon death, and the game ends after completing only 3 zones.

== Plot ==
G-Darius is a prequel story that revolves around a conflict between the humanoids of Amelia and cyborg/chimera biovessels known as the "Thiima" (meant to mean simply "deliverer of death"). The Thiima had been aroused by the Amnelian army's use of the weapon A.N. (All-Nothing) to annihilate the world Blazer, whom Amelia had been at war with over jurisdiction over the moon Mahsah. Determined to protect their existence, and long ago programmed to protect the universe from just such threats as A.N., the Thiima swarmed Amelia. Although the armed forces were badly ravaged, Amnelian scientists and engineers were able to make use of both A.N. and reverse-engineered Thiiman technology/life systems to create the Silver Hawk fighters. Ultimately, two pilots Sameluck Raida and Lutia Feen are chosen to perform a decisive attack on the main Thiima base: Kazumn, a satellite of the planet Darius.

== Ports ==
G-Darius was ported to the PlayStation as G Darius and released in 1998 for Japan on April 9 by Taito, in Europe on September 11, and in the United States on September 17 by THQ. The PlayStation port is based on the "ver. 2" arcade release. The original arcade version of G-Darius was later re-released on the PlayStation 2 port of Taito Legends 2, a compilation consisting of several arcade games by Taito. The Windows 95 version, based on the PlayStation port, was published by CyberFront Corporation, MediaKite, and Sourcenext in 2000–01.

A port for Nintendo Switch and Sony PlayStation 4 was released in 2021 worldwide digitally. It contains the standard resolution version, as well as a new HD version of the game. In the US and Europe, it was also released as a physical edition. In Japan, the physical release is part of the compilation Darius Cozmic Revelation. This compilation was released internationally by Strictly Limited Games. G-Darius HD Steam version was released on March 30, 2022. An update to the Switch and PS4 ports on the same date added G-Darius Ver. 2, G-Darius Ver. 2 HD and G-Darius for Consumer (the Japanese PlayStation port).

== Reception ==
Reception

Aggregate score
Aggregator	Score
GameRankings	79%

Review scores
Publication	Score
Edge	7/10
Electronic Gaming Monthly	8.75/10
Famitsu	29/40
Game Informer	8.25/10
GameFan	91%
GamePro	4/5
GameSpot	8.3/10
IGN	8/10
Next Generation	3/5
Official U.S. PlayStation Magazine	4/5
Dengeki PlayStation	80/100, 65/100, 75/100, 85/100

The PlayStation port received favorable reviews according to the review aggregation website GameRankings. Next Generation said that the game was "fun for those fogies who can stomach it, but the average gamer will be bored to death". In Japan, Famitsu gave it a score of 29 out of 40. Also in Japan, Game Machine listed the arcade version in their August 15, 1997, issue as being the fourth most-successful arcade game of the month. Five issues later (November 1), however, the magazine demoted it to being the tenth most-successful arcade game of the month.

In a 2014 retrospective, Euro-gamer called the game "one of the greatest shooting games ever released".
