= Darius (video game) =

1987 video game

- Japanese arcade flyer
- Developer: Taito
- Publisher: Taito
- Designers: Junji Yarita; Akira Fujita
- Programmer: Toru Sugawara
- Artist: Junji Yarita
- Composer: Hisayoshi Ogura
- Series: Darius
- Platforms: Arcade, CD-ROM², PC Engine, Amiga, Atari ST, ZX Spectrum, Game Boy Advance, i-mode, Yahoo! Mobile, EZAppli, Nintendo Switch, Nintendo Switch 2, Sony PlayStation 4, Sony PlayStation 5, Microsoft Xbox One, Microsoft Xbox Series X and Series S, Steam, Sega Genesis Mini, Sega Mega Drive Mini, Sega Genesis, Sega Mega Drive
- Release: January 1987: Arcade; EU: January 1987; JP: February 1987; NA: April 1987 CD-ROM²; JP: March 16, 1990 PC Engine; JP: September 21, 1990 Amiga, Atari ST, ZX Spectrum; EU: 1990 Sega Genesis Mini Sega Mega Drive Mini; WW: September 19, 2019 , Sega Genesis Sega Mega Drive; WW: October 2020 Sony PlayStation 4 Sony PlayStation 5 Microsoft Xbox One Microsoft Xbox Series S/X Steam; JP: February 19, 2019 , WW: March 5, 2020 , WW: November 17, 2021
- Genre: Scrolling shooter
- Modes: Single-player, multiplayer

Darius (Note: Japanese: ダライアス, Hepburn: Daraiasu) is a 1987 horizontally scrolling shooter video game developed and published by Taito for arcades. Players control a starship named the Silver Hawk in its mission to destroy the Belser empire before they wipe out the planet Darius. Its gameplay involves traversing through a series of scrolling levels while destroying enemies and collecting power-up icons. It is notable for its unique three-screen panoramic display.

The game was designed by a small team of others led by Junji Yarita. In contrast to other similar games, which feature mechanical or insect-like enemies, Darius uses aquatic creatures like fish and crabs for its enemies and screen-filling bosses. Its large arcade cabinet, based on Taito's earlier panoramic display game Laser Grand Prix (1983), was designed to provide a cinematic atmosphere and stand out from other games at the time. The soundtrack was created by Taito's "house band" Zuntata, the majority being composed through a combination of FM synthesis and sampling.

== Gameplay ==
Arcade version screenshot

Darius is a two-dimensional horizontally scrolling shoot 'em up set in a fictional future. Uniquely among shoot 'em ups, the game's screen is three times wider than conventional size, and the arcade cabinet uses an arrangement of three screens to accommodate it. The player controls an ornate fighter spacecraft, named the Silver Hawk, and must navigate through scrolling terrain while battling a variety of fighter craft, ground vehicles, turrets, and other obstacles throughout the game's stages (referred to as zones in the game). The ship's arsenal consists of forward-firing missiles, aerial bombs and a protective force field, all of which can be upgraded by power-ups (in the form of large, colored orbs) that are dropped by specially-colored enemies throughout the game's zones. When the player reaches the end of a zone, a boss appears, which must be defeated to proceed. Once the boss of a zone is destroyed, the player is given a choice of which zone to play next via a branching path. While there are 28 zones in total, only seven can be played in a single run.

== Plot ==
After years of pollution and the depletion of natural resources on Earth, humans decided to search beyond the Solar System for habitable planets to live on. A space program dedicated to this premise eventually found a solar system similar to the Earthling's and the space colonists selected a habitable planet they named Darius.

After settling on Darius, the inhabitants learned to start a new life and thrive in both society and technology. However, their peace was disturbed by an armada of malevolent maritime shaped space craft controlled by the Belser Army, a race of humanoid space colony based warrior people who have selected the Darius colonists as their next combatants. The Darius inhabitants' only line of defense were the Silver Hawk series: single-piloted fighter craft designed for long space travel with the ability to wield different weapons at the same time. Two of the fleet's top pilots were selected to defend Darius: Proco and Tiat. Together, the two assigned in thwarting Belser's attack on Darius.

== Development ==
Darius was designed by Junji Yarita, with assistance by planner Akira Fujita and programmer Toru Sugawara. Fujita was interested in creating a shoot'em up game where the player fought a huge battleship at the end of each stage — as a way to "spice things up" and make it stand out among other similar games, Fujita made the bosses themed around fish and other aquatic creatures. Yarita designed these battleships and created a total of 26 different designs, but time constraints only allowed the development team to use 11 of them in the final game. A single boss took roughly ten days to create. Some of the unused designs made it onto the game's promotional material, which was attributed to the art being outsourced to a different company.

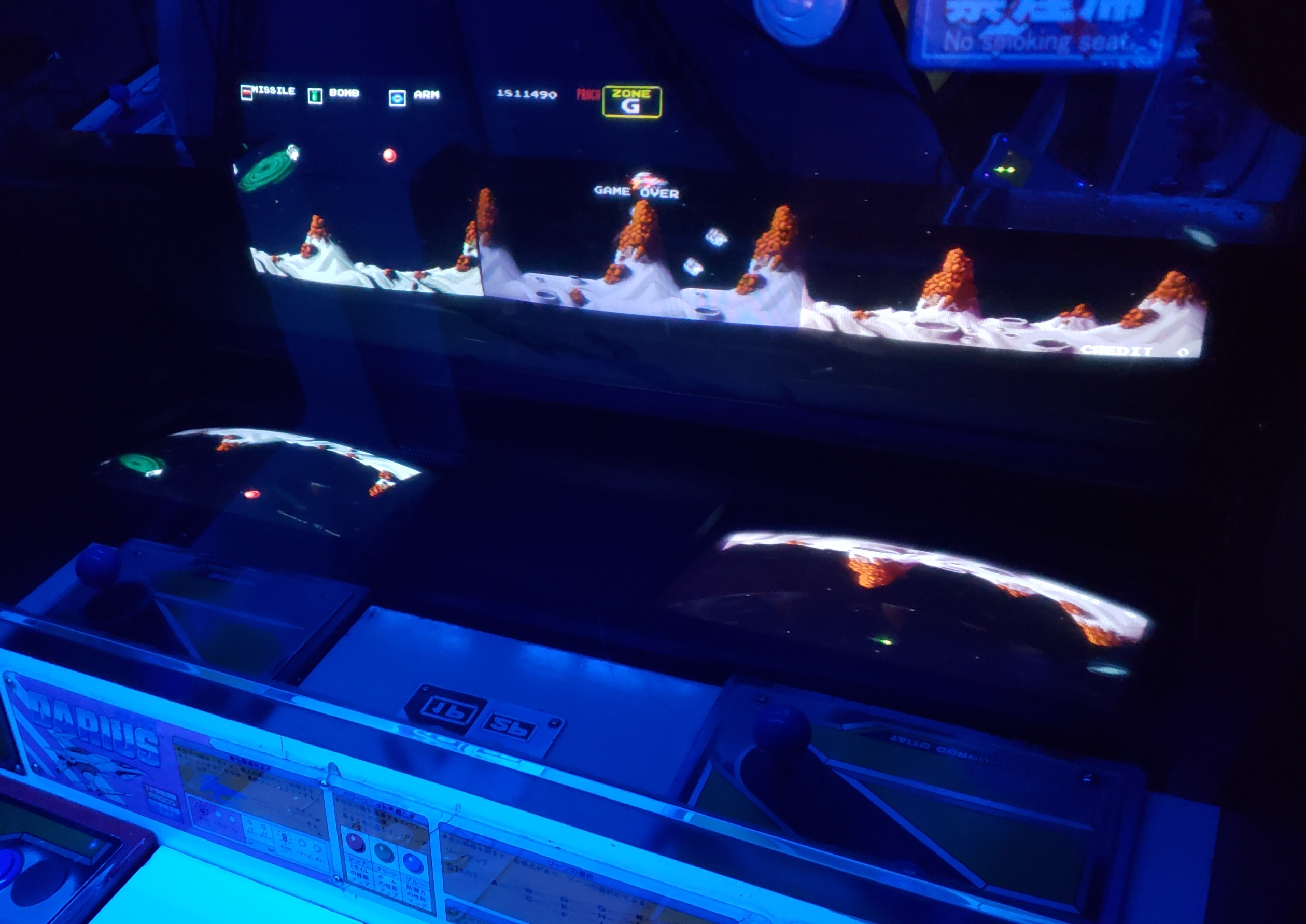
Darius cabinets use mirrors on the sides of the center monitor to reflect monitors below.

The arcade cabinet, designed by Natsuki Hirosawa, uses three individual monitors made to appear seamless via mirror effects. The idea was previously used in Taito's earlier games Wyvern F-O and Super Dead Heat, and was added to give the game a more cinematic presentation and to make it feel more unique compared to other shooting games on the market. A headphone jack and volume dials are also present, as is a speaker system installed beneath the player's seat, which is referred to by Taito as a "body sonic" system. This concept was originally meant to be used for the 1983 game Laser Grand Prix, but it proved too costly and was scrapped. The enemy names were derived from different types of medicine, alongside names of people within the company spelled backwards. Fujita worked on the stage designs and power-ups himself, which he stated was one of the biggest challenges during development — ship upgrades were originally in the form of small pod-like craft that orbited the player; Fujita disliked this idea and cut it from the game.

The game's upbeat soundtrack was composed by Hisayoshi Ogura, the founder of Taito's "house band" Zuntata. Ogura wanted the music to convey a sense of a deep, expanded universe, and to make it stand out among other shoot'em up games at the time. Much of the music was composed via a combination of FM synthesis and sampling, while some was made by the Yokosuka Symphony orchestra group. The song "Captain Neo", used in the game's first zone, was originally used as the main theme for Taito's earlier arcade game Metal Soldier Isaac II, used as a placeholder track during its presentation at tradeshows — Ogura liked the track for its sense of "overwhelming power", and decided to keep it in the final version.

== Release ==
The arcade game made its debut at London's Amusement Trades Exhibition International (ATEI) show in January 1987. In the same year, Darius was released for arcades in Japan in February, and in North America in April.

Three PC Engine ports were produced by NEC Avenue for the Japanese market in 1990: Super Darius was released for the CD-ROM² System add-on on March 16, followed by Darius Plus as an 8-Megabit HuCard version on September 21. Darius Plus is the only commercially released HuCard that has enhanced support for the PC Engine SuperGrafx. A third version, Darius Alpha, was released as a sweepstakes giveaway and was limited to only 800 copies. Darius Alpha is an alternate version of Darius Plus where the player fights only the bosses. Like Darius Plus, it has enhanced support for the SuperGrafx. All three PC Engine versions were developed by Bits Laboratory. During the same year, a home computer version of the game titled Darius+ (unrelated to the similarly titled PC Engine port) was developed and published by The Edge for the Amiga, Atari ST and ZX Spectrum in Europe. In 2002, PCCW Japan ported the game to the Game Boy Advance in Japan as Darius R.

Hamster Corporation released the game as part of their Arcade Archives series for the PlayStation 4 in 2016 and Nintendo Switch in 2022. While never originally ported to the Sega Genesis, a port of the game by M2 is featured on the Sega Genesis Mini microconsole. An expanded version titled Darius Extra Version was released for the Sega Genesis, as well as the Sega Mega Drive, with Strictly Limited Games handling publishing duties for the North American release, while Columbus Circle handled publishing duties for the European and Japanese, releases. However, it is not to be confused with the same named enhanced version of Darius for the arcade, as it has an additional number of features that are not in the same-named arcade game, and it only has single player play, as in Darius for the Sega Genesis Mini and the Sega Mega Drive Mini. Darius Extra Version is also the second rarest port of the game, with just 2,000 copies of the video game being made worldwide.

== Reception ==
Reception

Review scores
Publication	Score
AllGame	3.5/5 (PCE)
Computer and Video Games	Positive (Arcade); 79% (Amiga)
Raze	88% (PCE)
Commodore User	81% (Amiga)

In April 1987, Game Machine listed Darius as being the most popular upright arcade unit in Japan at the time. It went on to be the third highest-grossing large arcade game of 1987 in Japan.
