= List of Nintendo DS accessories =

Accessories for the Nintendo DS console

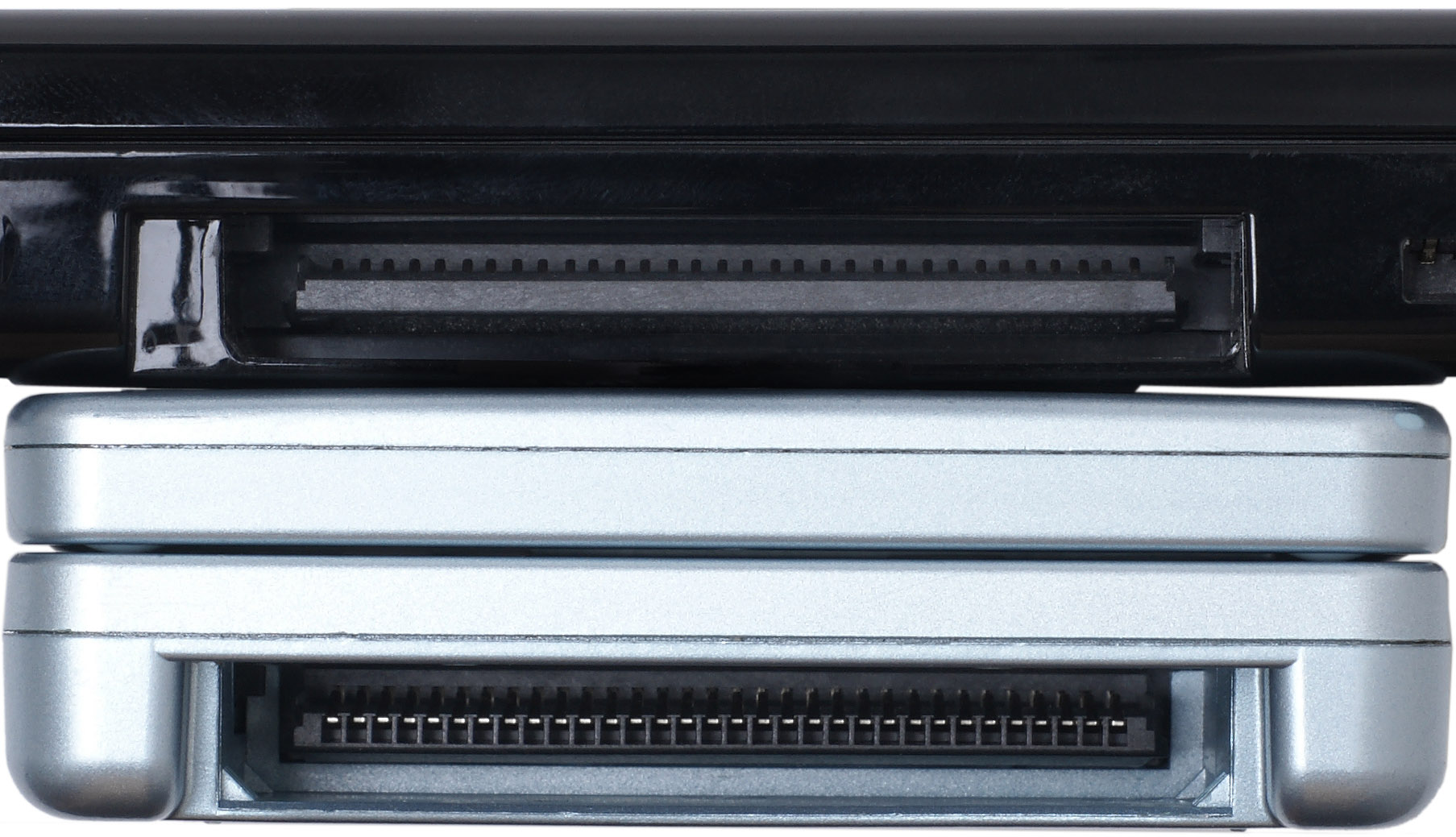
Game Boy Advance game slot on the Nintendo DS Lite (above) and the Game Boy Advance SP (below). Many accessories used the Game Boy Advance slot to connect to the Nintendo DS.

This is a list of accessories for the Nintendo DS.

Accessories for the Nintendo DS often came in two forms: those that worked with Slot 1 as a regular DS cartridge, and those that worked in Slot 2 (for Game Boy Advance cartridges) known as a "DS Option Pak" when inserted in the DS or DS Lite system's main menu. When inserted, the GBA slot option on the DS menu will show the text "There is a DS Option Pak inserted", with the exception of any DS/GBA connectivity accessories such as Boktai Solar Sensors and Lunar Knights.

Nintendo has emphasized that its primary intention for the inclusion of a GBA cartridge slot was to allow a wide variety of accessories to be released for the system, the Game Boy Advance compatibility titles being a logical extension.

As the Nintendo DSi and later models lack a GBA slot, Option Paks are not compatible with it, rendering certain games unplayable.

== Official accessories ==
=== Rumble Pak ===
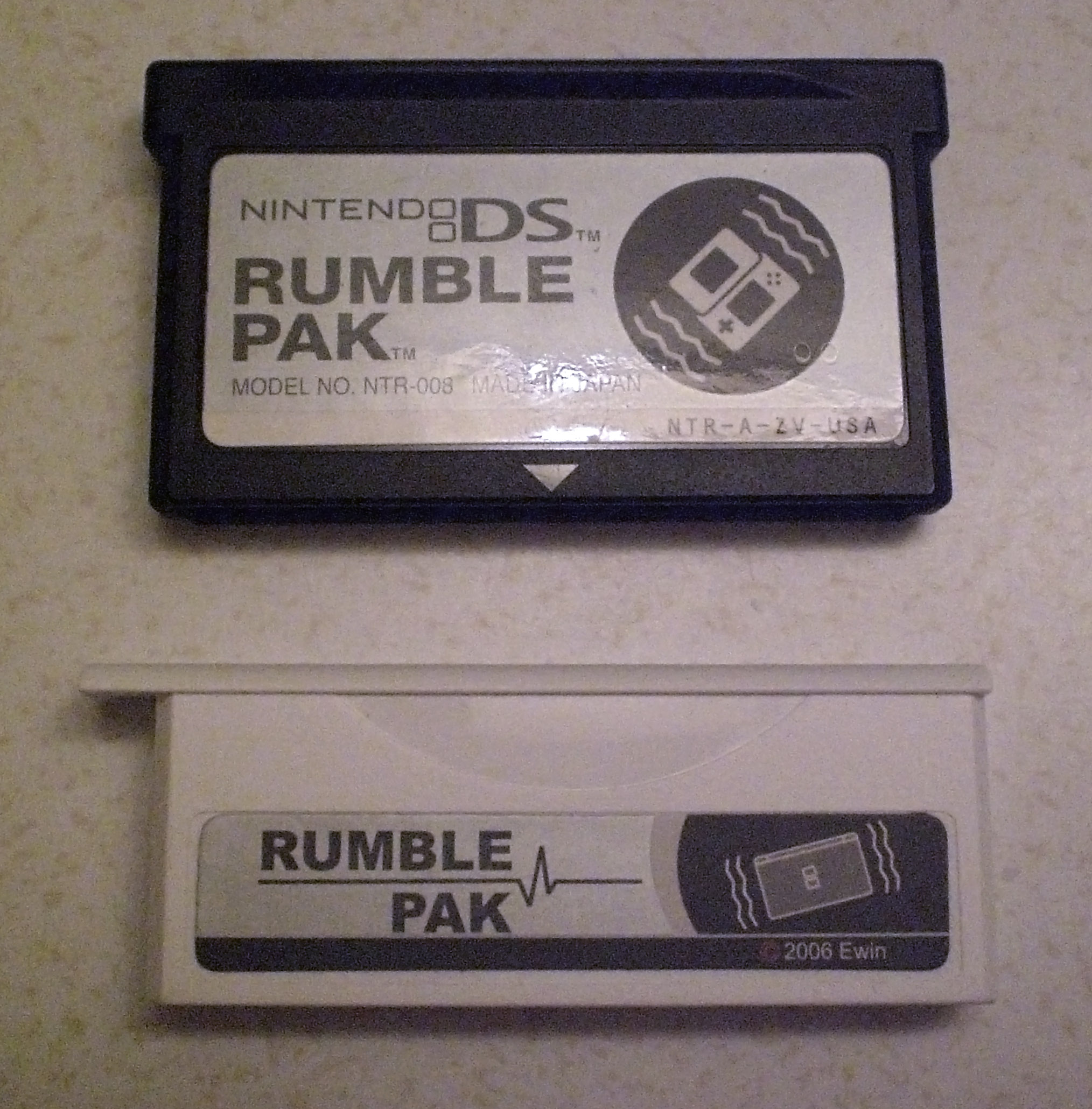
Rumble Pak for the Nintendo DS and a smaller third party version for the Nintendo DS Lite by eWin

The Rumble Pak, also known as the Option Pak, was the first official expansion slot accessory in the form of a Game Boy Advance cartridge. The Rumble Pak provides force feedback for a limited number of games in reaction to events such as collisions in racing games or taking damage in combat-oriented games. It was released on October 24, 2005, and bundled with Metroid Prime Pinball, although it can be purchased separately.

A specially designed Rumble Pak was released in Japan in late May 2006 for the Nintendo DS Lite. The cartridge is about 1 cm shorter to prevent it from protruding out of the Nintendo DS Lite as standard Game Boy Advance cartridges do. There was never an officially licensed western version of the DS Lite Rumble Pak, however there were some off-brand and unlicensed versions released by various companies (see below).

Because the Rumble Pak is an Option Pak that requires a Game Boy Advance slot, it is incompatible with all subsequent Nintendo handhelds that do not have it, namely the DSi, DSi XL, or the Nintendo 3DS family. However, no games that used the Rumble Pak required it to play, meaning that those games are not incompatible with those models.

List of compatible games
- Air Traffic Chaos
- Akagawa Jirou Mystery: Yasoukyoku
- Akai Ito DS
- Akai Ito Destiny DS
- Animal Boxing
- Bakusou Dekotora Densetsu Black
- Bomberman 2
- Clubhouse Games
- Corvette Evolution GT
- Custom Robo Arena
- Diddy Kong Racing DS
- Dirt 2
- Elite Beat Agents
- Ferrari Challenge: Trofeo Pirelli
- Higurashi no Naku Koro ni Kizuna (all 4 volumes)
- Hot Wheels: Track Attack
- Hotel Dusk: Room 215
- Iron Man
- Jam with the Band
- Juiced 2: Hot Import Nights
- Last Window: The Secret of Cape West
- The Legend of Spyro: A New Beginning
- Magnetica
- Mahjong Fight Club DS - Wi-Fi Taiou
- Mario & Luigi: Partners in Time
- Mario & Luigi: Bowser's Inside Story (Japan only)
- Metroid Prime Hunters
- Metroid Prime Pinball
- Moero! Nekketsu Rhythm Damashii Osu! Tatakae! Ouendan 2
- Moon
- Need for Speed: Nitro
- Need for Speed: Undercover
- Orcs and Elves
- Picross DS
- Planet 51: The Game
- Power Pro Kun Pocket 9
- Power Pro Kun Pocket 10
- Professional Fisherman's Tour: Northern Hemisphere
- Puyo Puyo! 15th Anniversary
- Race Driver: Create and Race
- Race Driver: GRID
- Sega Superstars Tennis
- Sonic & SEGA All Stars Racing
- Space Invaders Extreme
- Space Invaders Extreme 2
- Star Fox Command
- Star Trek: Tactical Assault
- Super Princess Peach
- Theta
- Tomb Raider: Underworld
- TrackMania DS
- TrackMania Turbo
- Treasure Gaust: Gaust Diver
- Viva Piñata: Pocket Paradise
- Wario: Master of Disguise
- The Wild West
- WWE SmackDown vs. Raw 2008

=== Headset ===
The Nintendo DS Headset is the official headset for the Nintendo DS. It plugs into the headset port (a combination of a standard 3.5mm (1/8 inch) headphone connector, and a proprietary microphone connector) on the bottom of the system. It features one earphone and a microphone, and is compatible with all games that use the internal microphone. It was released in Japan on September 14, 2006. The headset was released in North America on April 22, 2007, alongside Pokémon Diamond and Pearl, two games that have built-in voice chat. It was later released in Australia on June 21, 2007, also alongside Pokémon Diamond and Pearl. Other communication headsets not made by Nintendo also work as the mic.

=== Opera Web Browser ===
On February 15, 2006, Nintendo announced a DS version of Opera, a cross-platform web browser. The browser took advantage of the device's dual screens by zooming in or having a longer vertical view. The browser went on sale in Japan on July 24, 2006, for ¥3,800 (approx. $33). It was released in Europe on October 6, 2006.

=== Memory Expansion Pak ===
The Nintendo DS Browser ships with an 8 MB RAM Option Pak which is required for the browser to run. Two versions of the Memory Expansion Pak are available. One is compatible with both the original DS and the DS Lite. The second is a smaller translucent version which fits flush with the body of the DS Lite. However, the original DS version can be used with the Nintendo DS Lite, as said in the back of the box.

The Expansion Pak is not used by any other commercial software, but some homebrew applications such as MoonShell or Quake DS can use it.

=== Faceningscan ===
The Faceningscan is a camera Option Pak that plugs into the GBA slot of the DS. It is only compatible with 2 games: Face Training, a game exclusive to Japan which gives the player a view of their face as they use the game, and Shiseido Beauty Solution Kaihatsu Center Kanshuu: Project Beauty, another Japan-exclusive game by Sega that also used the camera attachment.

=== Slide Controller ===
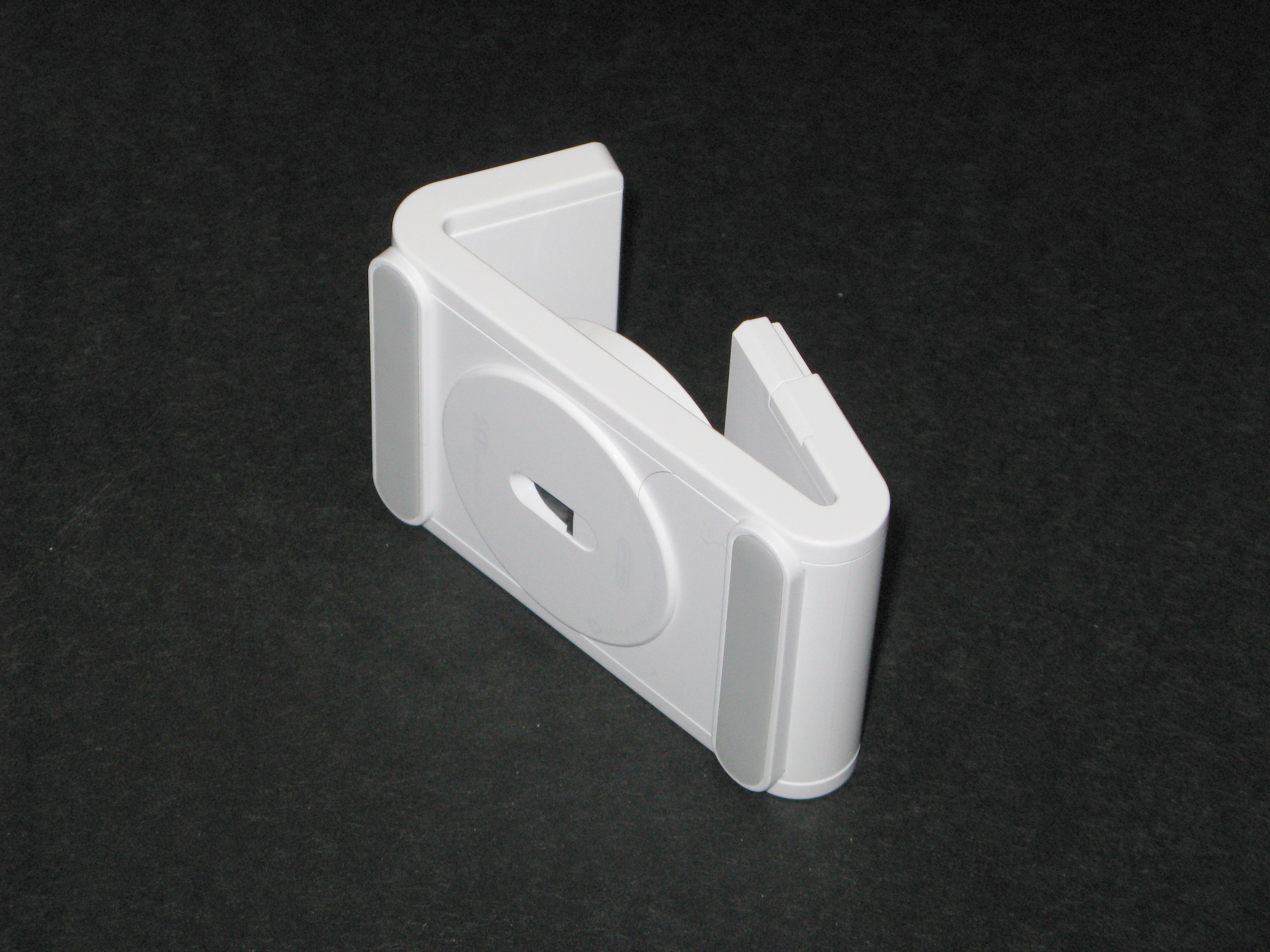
A view of the Slide Controller

The "Slide Controller" is an Option Pak that connects to the underside of a Nintendo DS, making the entire device act as an optical mouse. It launched as a Japan-exclusive on August 3, 2007. The Slide Controller is bundled with the game Slide Adventure MAGKID. The Mag Kid is a small magnet centered on the touchscreen. The Slide Controller is attached to Slot 2 of the DS, using technology similar to an optical mouse, with a red LED light located at the bottom of the controller. In order to move the Mag Kid across the screen during the game, the player must slide the entire Nintendo DS system with this controller at a slant angle on a table surface. The slide controller also has built in rumble features used in the game.

=== Nintendo DS Digital TV Tuner ===
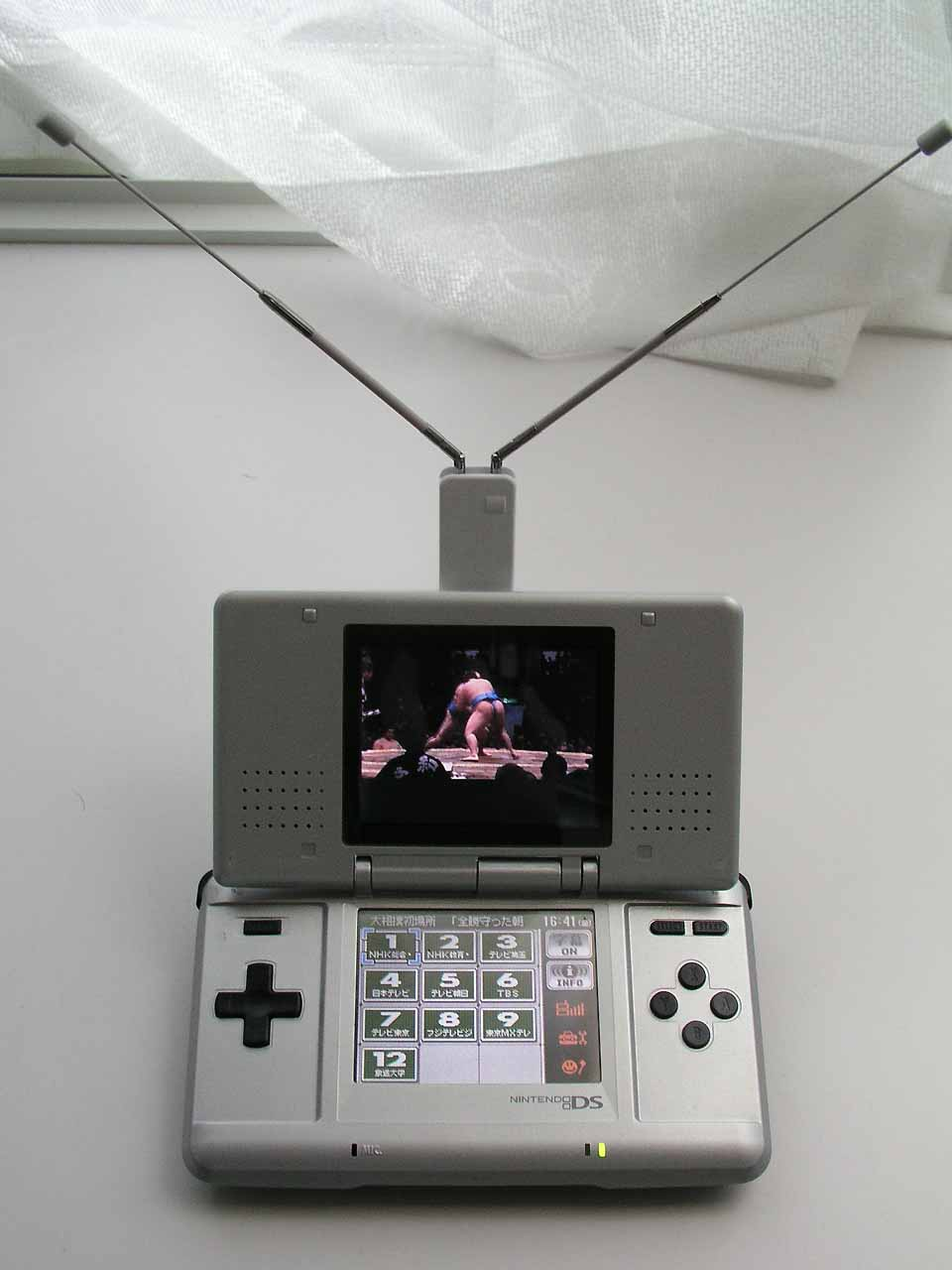
Nintendo DS with "DS Terebi" 1seg tuner

The Nintendo DS Digital TV Tuner (ワンセグ受信アダプタ ＤＳテレビ, Wansegu Jushin Adaputa Dī Esu Terebi) is a 1seg TV tuner that picks up TV signals and plays them on the Nintendo DS, released exclusively for Japan through Nintendo's online shop. It was released on November 23, 2007. The top screen is for watching the broadcast in 16:9 or 4:3 ratio, while the touch screen is used to change the channels. It was packaged with the DS TV [NTR-016], DS TV dedicated cover [NTR-017], and DS TV Dedicated External Antenna (with suction panel) [NTR-025]. The external antenna plugged into the side of the DS TV itself through a standard headphone jack. A series of three suction cups could be used to attach the wire to a window or other smooth surfaces.

The DSTV folds in when not in use with the half containing extendable rabbit ear antennas. The other half clips onto the DS and has a locking mechanism for stability. A button on the side releases the lock. The dedicated cover slips over both halves of the folded DSTV when not in use, covering the contacts over the cartridge portion of the DSTV. While the TV tuner was a Japan-only accessory (due to it only using 1seg signals), it works with all DS and 3DS models.

=== Activity Meter ===
The activity meter is a pedometer included with Personal Trainer: Walking (also named Walk With Me in Europe and other regions). It communicates with the DS using an infrared transceiver built into the top of the meter, and one in the end of the game cartridge, meaning it works with all Nintendo DS / 3DS consoles. Its only display is an LED which changes its colour and flashing pattern once the user reaches their daily step goal; all other information has to be viewed by transferring it to the Nintendo DS cartridge. The device stores the final seven days of detailed activity statistics, and the last 60 days of total step counts. There is a clip built into the meter's battery door allowing it to be attached to a person's clothes or a dog's collar. A flat battery door without the clip is also included. The system came with two meters, one is black and one is white.

In Europe a green and white activity meter came with Active Health with Carol Vorderman It could also be bought separately.

The games that supported this were Personal Trainer: Walking and Active Health with Carol Vorderman.

=== Pokéwalker ===
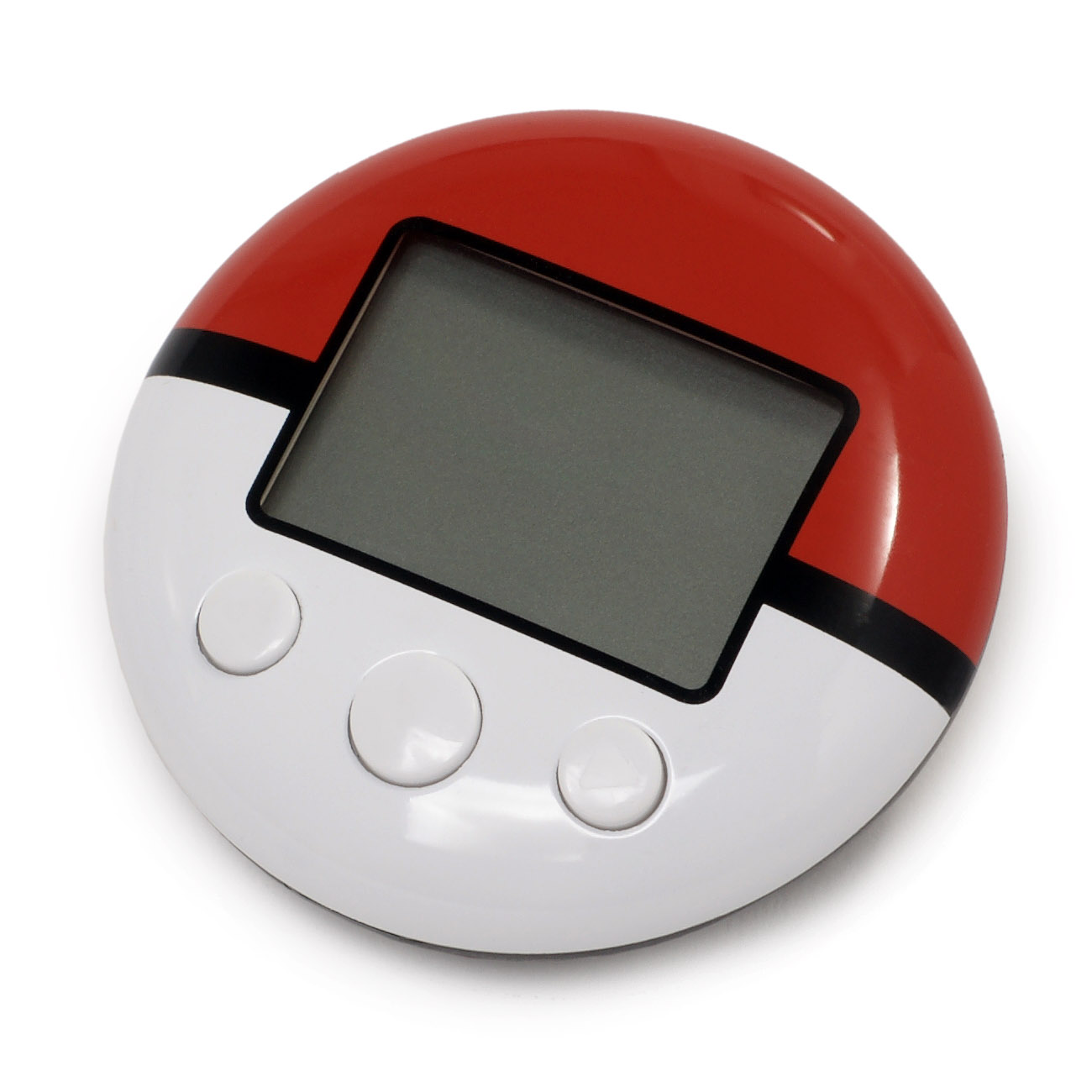
The Pokéwalker was bundled with Pokémon HeartGold and SoulSilver.

The Pokéwalker (ポケウォーカー, Pokewōkā) is a Poké Ball-shaped pedometer that can connect to Pokémon HeartGold and SoulSilver game cards via infrared signals. The player can transfer a Pokémon to the Pokéwalker from either HeartGold or SoulSilver. Every time the player takes a step, the Pokémon inside gains experience points and the player earns "Watts", a type of in-game currency which was also used on the Pokémon Pikachu virtual pet. Players can also catch various Pokémon on the device and obtain items, then transfer them to the game. The device comes bundled with the games.

When players transfer a Pokémon from their game into their Pokéwalker, they can select which route they would like to take their Pokémon along. Depending on which route the player takes (such as in a grassland or by the sea), they will encounter different wild Pokémon and items. When players first begin their journeys with the Pokéwalker, the list of routes they can select from is short. As players take strolls with their Pokémon, more routes are unlocked with additional Pokémon and items.

One criticism of the Pokéwalker is the ease of "cheating" or "hacking" in which players will intentionally create artificial situations mimicking walking. This has consequently led to multiple varieties of Pokéwalker cheats causing Pokémon to gain experience without the user actually expending the intended effort.

Due to its efficient accuracy when compared to some other pedometers, the Pokéwalker's technical design had since been reused to work for other titles, such as Wii Fit U, which is compatible with the Fit Meter pedometer, an accessory which shares hardware and design with the Pokéwalker.

=== Nintendo Wireless Keyboard ===
The Nintendo Wireless Keyboard (ニンテンドーワイヤレスキーボード, Nintendō Waiyaresu Kībōdo), released with Learn with Pokémon: Typing Adventure, was a Bluetooth wireless keyboard for learning how to type quickly and accurately. The keyboard can be put into a "pairing" mode by holding "Fn" while switching it on; it could then connect with other hardware.

=== MP3 Player/Play-Yan/Play-Yan Micro ===
The Nintendo MP3 Player was an accessory (cartridge) for the Nintendo DS lite that turned the DS or GBA into a functioning MP3 player.

The Play-Yan had two releases in Japan. The first version Play-Yan, had game mini-games which could be downloaded from the website (Play-Yan Garage Games). While the updated Play-Yan Micro (same as the MP3 Player in Europe) was not compatible with the mini-games.

=== DS Direction Sensing Card ===
The DS Direction Sensing Card was a Slot 1 cartridge that added a compass feature to DS products. Astroarts Hoshizora Navi uses the DS direction sensing card to figure out one's current orientation and adjusts it on the screen star chart accordingly. The cartridge is double the size of a standard cartridge, sticks out of the slot 1 much like the TV Tuner, and has a locking mechanism on the side with a button to release the cart/compass.

=== DS vision ===
A Japan media players made by Nintendo are available with a micro SD slot that allows Nintendo DS users to download variable content from a central Nintendo server.

=== Magnetic Stand ===
The Magnetic Stand is a stand that utilizes the Slot 2 to hold up the DS or DS Lite. It has embedded magnets on the back and can be closed and hung on a metallic surface such as a refrigerator (for use with cooking, music or exercise programs). It comes with a special stylus with a knob at one end and a string attached to it to hang from the stand. Although it was marketed alongside Personal Trainer: Cooking, it can work with any title.

=== DS Stand ===
The DS Stand, included with Face Training, helps hold the DS or DS Lite in profile format so that the system and camera can be used hands-free.

=== Wi-Fi USB Connector ===
The Nintendo Wi-Fi USB Connector is a device that plugs into an open USB port on a computer, and allows the Nintendo DS and Wii to access Nintendo Wi-Fi Connection through it. This device is not needed if one already owns a Nintendo Wi-Fi capable wireless router. The device is only compatible with Windows XP and Windows Vista, with a broadband Internet. Nintendo stopped making the connector because of computers or firewalls blocking some of the programs, which means that it is not supported on any Windows OS after Windows Vista.

=== GBA/DS Connectivity ===
In addition to features added by Slot 2 accessories and functionality, a number of GBA games (both first and third party) offered slot 2 support as well offering add-ons and content to their DS counterparts (similar to extra features added by GBC/GBA link functionality on certain GBC games on a GBA, or GBA/GC connectivity on a number of games). For example, putting GBA generation Pokémon games in Slot 2 would allow Pokémon from the GBA game to transfer into the DS games. Connecting Castlevania: Aria of Sorrow into Castlevania: Dawn of Sorrow would unlock a few extra items in the store and the player's inventory. Unlockables varied per game, including in-game wallpaper/pictures, videos, items, new characters, easter eggs, new areas, in-game currency, mini-games, bonus outfits, new music, extra bosses, etc.

=== Stylus ===
There is a basic stylus that fits inside the DS stylus slot. The stylus came with every iteration of DS up to 3DS and 2DS systems.

Licensed and unlicensed third party styluses were also released as well. Some were exclusive to preorders such as the Orcs & Elves Magic Wand stylus, Squeeballs Party Character Stylus, or the limited edition blue Guitar Pick Pick stylus for Guitar Hero: On Tour. Other colors of Guitar Pick Styluses came with various Guitar Hero and spin off games on the DS.

The original DS came with a small stylus, and the DS Lite came with a slightly larger version. The DSi used more standard sized ones that were similar to the ones introduced with the Lite.

The original 3DS came with a telescoping metal and plastic stylus, but later models (3DS XL, New 3DS, New 3DS XL, 2DS and New 2DS) used solid plastic styluses again (similar to the ones that came with the DS Lite/DSi/DSi XL).

=== Nintendo DS Wrist Strap & thumb stylus ===
The original DS came with a special wrist strap, which included a small piece of smooth plastic intended to be used as a stylus with one's thumb. The wrist strap could be bought separately with later editions of the DS through the Nintendo Store, and all iterations of the DS had a hole for the official thumb stylus wrist straps or third-party straps.

The wrist strap has a small plastic pad attached to it that can also be used on the Touch Screen. This pad is designed for use on games that work better with a sliding type of control. To use it, a player must place their thumb or finger against the plastic pad and slide the straplock along the wrist strap to hold the pad in place.

=== Game Pak Slot Cover ===
This was an accessory that came with DS Lites in assorted colors matching the system it came with. It was a blank Option Pak that fit into the Slot 2 flush with the system to keep dust out of the slot.

Some modders have repurposed them for DIY Rumble Pak projects.

== Licensed third party accessories ==
=== Guitar Grip ===
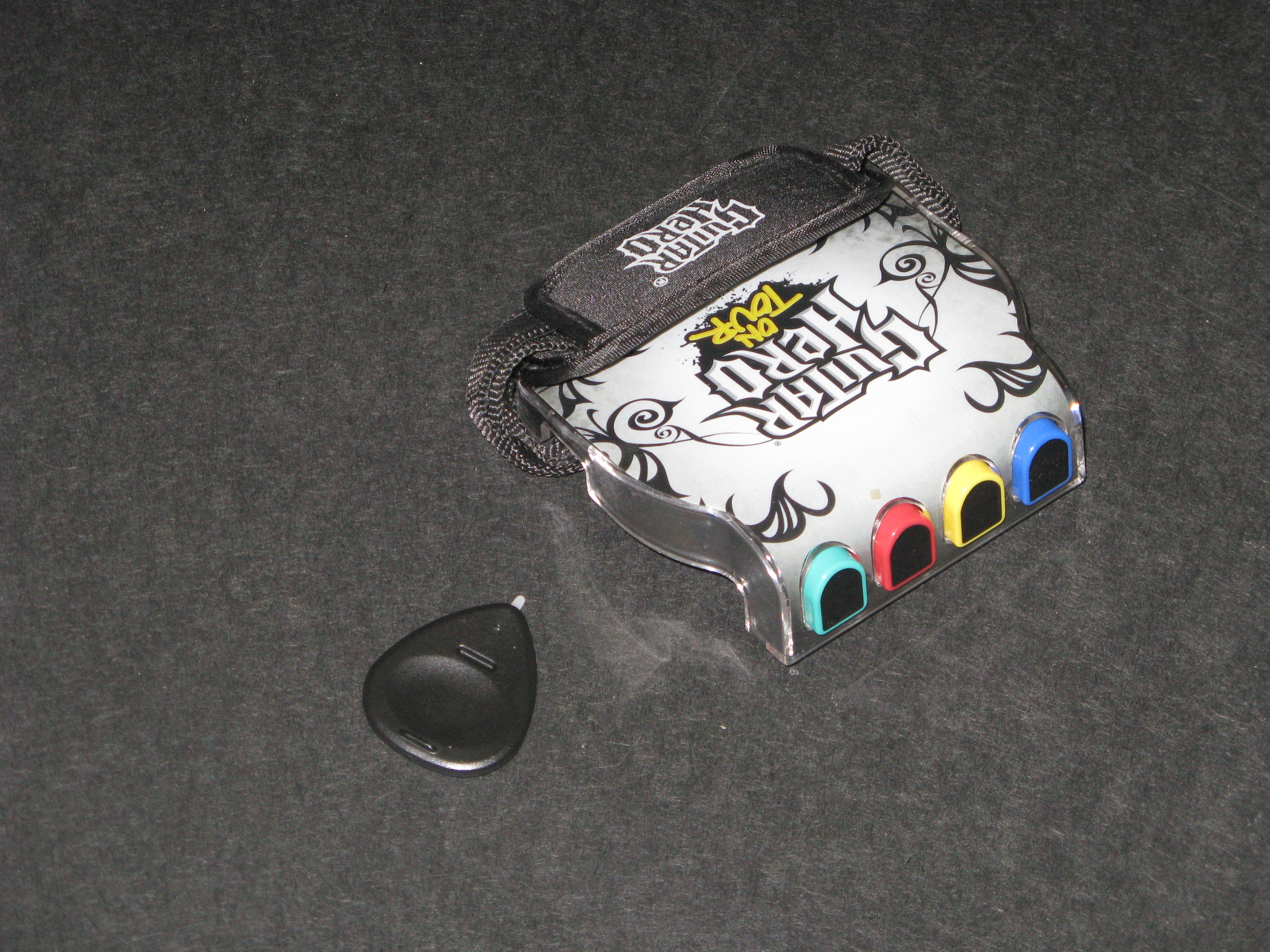
The "Guitar Grip" fits into the GBA slot on the Nintendo DS to simulate the guitar controller.

The Guitar Grip controller is an Option Pak that comes packaged with the game Guitar Hero: On Tour and is plugged into the GBA game slot. It features four colored buttons just like the ones that can be found on regular Guitar Hero guitar controllers for the stationary consoles, though it lacks the fifth orange button found on the guitar controllers. The DS Guitar Hero controller comes with a small plectrum-stylus that can be put away into a small slot on the controller. It also features a hand strap.

The controller comes with two Option Pak adapters, one for the DS Lite, and one for the original DS. The grip is required in order to play any of the Guitar Hero: On Tour games, and is also used to play Band Hero for the DS.

Each game came with its own themed style insert to put into the Guitar Grip to decorate the grip. There were also additional designs sold, along with stickers to decorate the grip as well.

Supported titles:

- Guitar Hero: On Tour
- Guitar Hero On Tour: Decades
- Guitar Hero On Tour: Modern Hits
- Band Hero

=== Drum Skin ===
The Band Hero DS Drum Skin is a piece of rubberized silicon that slips over a DS Lite, and is designed to better enable the feel of rapidly playing the drums rather than tapping on drum icons on the DS touch screen.

=== Paddle controller ===
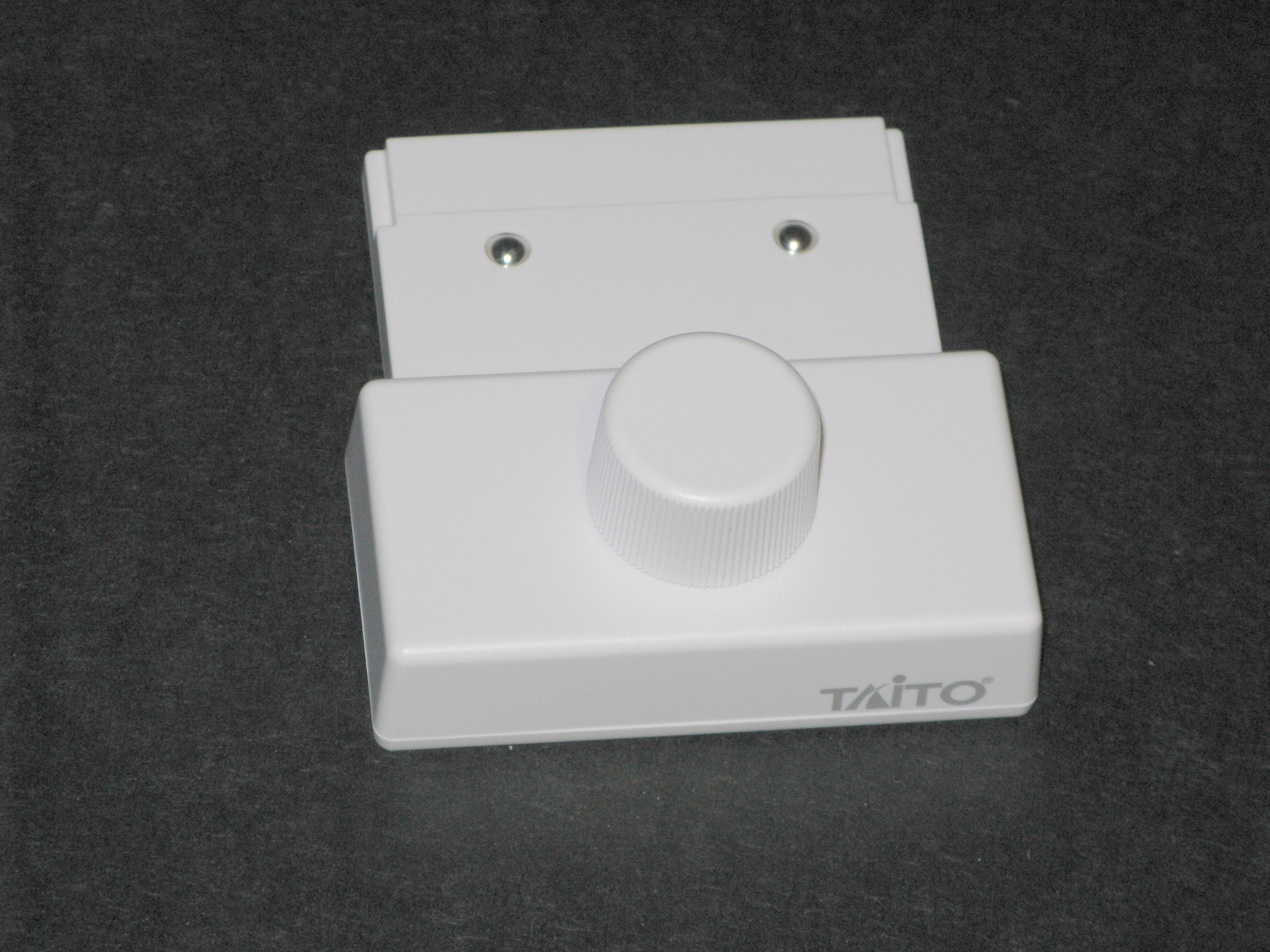
The Paddle controller is an optical encoder knob like those found on Arkanoid arcade machines.

The Paddle controller is an Option Pak manufactured by Taito. It was sold exclusively in Japan both as a standalone and bundled with Arkanoid DS. The paddle controller is a miniature version of the arcade knob controllers that were first made popular with Pong. They came in assorted colors, including the most common one, white (which came with the game), followed by black, pink and silver, each sold separately.

Supported titles:

- Arkanoid DS
- Space Invaders Extreme
- Space Invaders Extreme 2
- Space Bust-a-Move

Despite being available only in Japan, the controller is compatible with versions of the above titles from all other regions.

=== Motion Pack ===
Tony Hawk's Motion uses a motion-sensing peripheral Option Pak called the "Motion Pack", which is inserted into the Game Boy Advance's Slot 2 as the method of control. It is compatible with Tony Hawk's Motion and Hue Pixel Painter.

=== Didget blood glucose monitoring system ===
The Didget blood glucose monitoring system is a blood glucose meter Option Pak that was developed by Bayer HealthCare together with Paul Wessel, the father of a child with diabetes mellitus. It is essentially an upgraded version of the Glucoboy for the Game Boy Advance, which Wessel developed for his son Luke who often lost his blood glucose meter. Wessel later founded his own company, Guidance Interactive Healthcare, to pursue the creation of children's blood glucose meters. The peripheral came with a pack-in game entitled Knock 'Em Downs - Worlds Fair developed by Sensory Sweep Studios, which is a series of minigames where players are rewarded with bonuses and power-ups should they regularly check their blood sugar levels.

Supported titles:

- Knock 'Em Downs - Worlds Fair

=== Magic Reader ===
The Magic Reader was an Option Pak manufactured by Konami. It was another card reader that plugged into Slot 2, and came with Juushinden: Ultimate Beast Battlers (a card game similar to Yu-Gi-Oh). The cards were read by tapping them onto the top of the device.

=== Piano Keyboard ===
Easy Piano is an Option Pak that includes a 13 key piano that attaches to the DS through the Game Boy Advance game slot.

Supported titles:

- Easy Piano

=== Beypoint Reader and Beypointer ===
Made specifically for the Beyblade series, the Beypoint Reader and Beypointer Option Pak was a GBA Slot 2 device that acted as an adapter that connected the Nintendo DS game to a Beypointer. It attaches to a Beyblade Launcher and keeps track of the player's top spinning Beyblade stats in both real life and the Nintendo DS game. The BPR came with the game Metal Fight Beyblade.

Supported titles:

- Metal Fight Beyblade/Metal Fight Beyblade DS
- Metal Fight Beyblade - Bakutan Cyber Pegasis
- Metal Fight Beyblade - Bakushin Susanoo Shurai
- Beyblade: Metal Fusion
- Beyblade: Metal Masters

=== Pedometer ===
Known as the "Thrustmaster Ubisoft Pedometer", the Pedometer is a Slot 2 compatible Pedometer Option Pak that came with My Weightloss Coach by Ubisoft.

=== Solar Sensors ===
Lunar Knights added solar sensor functionality by utilizing the three Boktai games in Slot 2 ("W-Gate") as Option Paks (DS/GBA Connectivity). Each game offered a different function in relation to the energy taken from the sun.

Depending on which game is introduced into the W-Gate, the Solar Sensor will cause different effects in Lunar Knights:

- Solar Sensor Version 1: By inserting Boktai: The Sun Is in Your Hand in the GBA Slot, the standby character will fill his ENE (Energy).
- Solar Sensor Version 2: By inserting Boktai 2: Solar Boy Django in the GBA Slot, the standby character will fill his LIFE.
- Solar Sensor Version 3: By inserting Shin Bokura no Taiyō: Gyakushū no Sabata in the GBA Slot, the standby character will fill his TRC (Trance) meter.

=== SmartStylus & SmartStylus 2 (unreleased) ===
The SmartStylus and SmartStylus 2 by PDP were to add vibration feedback "based on movements and commands in the game." It came in two models, which were the wireless SmartStylus 1 and 2 devices for the Nintendo DS. Both feature a vibration feedback that players using the stylus will feel based on movements and commands in the game. The SmartStylus 2 includes a variety of added features, including LED, sound, and motion feedback. With the motion feedback capability, the stylus acts as a motion input device, allowing the player, for example, to hit a home run by swinging the stylus off the DS screen. They were looking for licensing by Nintendo.

It was to come with a game called Squeeballs.

== Unlicensed 3rd party accessories ==
=== Ranger GPS System ===
The Ranger NDS GPS System is an Option Pak designed by China's Fab Chain, and is a GPS add-on module for a NDS Lite. It provides turn-by-turn directions with Google Maps integration. The Ranger can display maps in both 2D and fake 3D perspective modes, and even has automatic day/night modes.

=== Hyperkin 3 Game Selector ===
The Hyperkin 3 Game Selector is an add-on that plugs into Slot 1, and allows the player to both insert three different DS cartridges and select between them on the DS main menu.

=== FM Radio Converter ===
FM Radio Converters refer to a number of add-ons for the DS and DS Lite that added FM Radio support to the DS. The Dragon NDS Lite FM Radio Converter cart fits into Slot 2 (DS Lite only), while the FM Radio by Futureronics fits into Slot 1 (DS to DSi XL). The Bling Tunes FM Radio was yet another DS compatible radio add-on that simply attached to the DS, and linked through the audio-out jack.

=== Third Party Rumble Paks & Memory Expansion Paks ===
A number of unlicensed or generic third party rumble paks were released by various companies in lite or original formats as stand alone or conjunction with a flash cart. They utilized a number of different methods to add rumble to games, most using standard mobile-phone motor technology for rumble. Official ones used sliding motors from ALPS, leading to level of vibration between official and third party rumble paks being inconsistent or different (some noisier than others, or sometimes offering different settings for intensity via a flashcart menu).

Some unlicensed rumble paks were included inside slot 2 flashcards or as separate slot 2 accessories (with slot 1 flashcards). These include products such as the DSTT rumble pak (designed to work with DSTT flashcart), the EzFlash 3in1/Ezflash V (which included Rumble/Memory Expansion, and NOR GBA support for compatibility for DS/GBA connectivity), Supercard Lite (which was a slot 2 DS only flashcart with built in Rumble Pak, the rumble replaced GBA support), or the M3DS Real, that came with a generic lite rumble pak, the NDS/NDSL 2in1 rumble for R6 Gold flashcart, and many other brands. Most of these came in black or white options (but at least one off brand included transparent shells like the Lite Memory Expansion Pak).

Supercard Mini SD Rumble was a GBA cart sized combo-flashcart + Rumble Pak for the original DS (which had a clear atomic purple shell). EZ-Flash 3in1/Ez-Flash V also had versions for the original DS as well.

Ewin produced a North American version of the lite option pak following the June 11, 2006 release of the system. Ewin's expansion paks came in different colors to match the most common DS Lite colors at the time (black, white, pink, light blue, and other colors). This used a mobile-phone rumble motor as opposed to the official DS Lite which used a sliding motor.

There was the release of the Ez-Flash Omega Definitive Edition, which has a switch to switch the flashcart into 'Mode B'. This turns the cart into "Link" for DS/GBA linking, Rumble as a stand-alone rumble pak, and RAM as stand alone memory expansion for the Opera browser.

== Hacking and homebrew ==
=== Max Media Dock ===
Datel manufactures the Max Media Dock, which allows people to access, store and run media content from CompactFlash cards. It can accept cards up to 8 GB in size. This tool also lets people use DS homebrew. DS homebrew is software written for the Nintendo DS by hobbyist programmers, without licensing from Nintendo. A version of this was a card holding a 4gb HD inserted via Slot 2. Datel also released another media player/backup method Personal Media Player that came with a Slot 2 cartridge called the Gigapack.

Max Media Dock is compatible with both the original Nintendo DS and the Nintendo DS Lite.

=== Flash Cartridges ===
Flash Cartridges are devices used for running software on the DS not hard-encoded into a cartridge, such as homebrew games, homebrew software, listening to music, viewing pictures or documents, other not-officially available functions, and virtual versions of the software on official cartridges, which were often stored on removable media such as an SD card. There are many DS flash cart variants on the market. Although they are still compatible with the DS, Slot 2 flash carts originally intended for the Game Boy Advance have been superseded by more modern DS flash cards which use Slot 1, such as the N-Card, M3, Supercard, EZFlash Vi, G6DS Real, DSTT, Acekard, and CycloDS Evolution.

=== GBA Movie Player ===
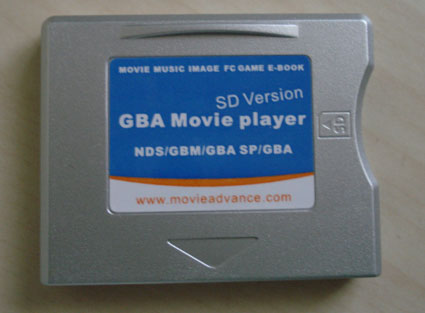
The GBA Movie Player SD version cartridge

The GBA Movie Player plays films and music from flash memory cards, and comes in both SD and CF versions.
