= Space Bust-a-Move =

2008 video game

- North American cover art
- Developer: Lancarse
- Publishers: JP: Taito; WW: Square Enix
- Series: Puzzle Bobble
- Platform: Nintendo DS
- Release: JP: December 18, 2008; NA: July 28, 2009; EU: August 28, 2009
- Genre: Puzzle
- Modes: Single-player, multiplayer

Space Bust-A-Move is a puzzle video game developed by Lancarse and published by Taito in Japan, and Square Enix worldwide for the Nintendo DS. It was first released in Japan under the title Space Puzzle Bobble (スペース パズルボブル, Supēsu Pazuru Boburu) on December 18, 2008. It was later released in North America under the title Space Bust-A-Move on July 28, 2009, and in Europe under the title Puzzle Bobble Galaxy on August 28, 2009. As with Arkanoid DS, Space Invaders Extreme and Space Invaders Extreme 2, the game is compatible with Taito's paddle controller.

== Gameplay ==
As with the previous games in the Puzzle Bobble series, the player controls a pointer on the bottom of the screen (with either the gamepad or Taito's paddle controller) that shoots differently-colored bubbles upwards. The object is to shoot bubbles at other bubbles of the same color at the top of the screen. When a group of three or more bubbles that touch each other are formed, then that group disappears. The objective is to clear the screen of all bubbles. Players can pick up various power-ups during the course of gameplay, such as stars that clear the playing field of all bubbles of a specific color or a flame that destroys a group of bubbles, regardless of color, within a certain radius. The levels remains the same, with some levels containing boss battles. The game includes a story mode, in which players go through eight "worlds" that reveal a story. It also includes a mode in which players can compete against other users via a Nintendo Wi-Fi Connection.

== Reception ==
Reception

Aggregate score
Aggregator	Score
Metacritic	71/100

Review scores
Publication	Score
Destructoid	8/10
Edge	5/10
Famitsu	31/40
GameRevolution	B
GameZone	7.5/10
IGN	7.8/10
NGamer	69%
Nintendo Life	9/10
Nintendo Power	7/10
Nintendo World Report	8/10
411Mania	7.8/10
Teletext GameCentral	6/10

The game received "mixed or average reviews" according to the review aggregation website Metacritic. It received some criticism for its controls, which Daemon Hatfield of IGN described in its Tokyo Game Show review as "slow and clunky", and for its continue system that makes players unable to continue directly at the stage they failed at. In Japan, Famitsu gave it a score of three eights and one seven for a total of 31 out of 40.
