= Wildspace =

Wildspace or Wild Space, may refer to:

- Wilderness areas, wild spaces
- Wildspace Conservation Park, London Riverside, Havering, London, England, UK
- WildSpace, a UK conservation scheme developed by Green Light Trust
- Wild Space (Star Wars), a fictional location in the Star Wars Galaxy Far Far Away; see List of Star Wars planets and moons
- The Clone Wars: Wild Space (novel), a 2008 Star Wars novel by Karen Miller
- Wildspace (module), a module for the game Advanced Dungeons & Dragons
- Wild Space (card game), a card game created by Joachim Thôme and published by Board Game Circus

== See also ==
- Tales from Wild Space (comics), a Star Wars comic book anthology serial; see List of Star Wars comic books
- Wild Wild Space (film), a 2024 documentary film about Space 2.0 spaceflight startup companies based on Ashlee Vance's non-fiction book When the Heavens Went on Sale
- Space (disambiguation)
- Wild (disambiguation)
- Wilderness (disambiguation)
- Wild West (disambiguation)
