= Wild Wild West (disambiguation) =

Wild Wild West is a 1999 film starring Will Smith and Kevin Kline

Wild Wild West or The Wild Wild West may refer to:

== Amusement parks and attractions ==
- Wild West Falls, formerly Wild Wild West, a log ride at Warner Bros. Movie World, Gold Coast, Australia
- The Wild Wild Wild West Stunt Show, a former attraction at Universal Studios Florida

== Film and television ==
- The Wild Wild West (film), a 1921 film starring Hoot Gibson
- The Wild Wild West, the 1965 to 1969 television series upon which the 1999 film Wild Wild West is based
- Elmo's World: Wild Wild West!, a 2001 direct-to-video special based on the Sesame Street segment Elmo's World

=== Television episodes ===
- "Wild, Wild West", a 1998 episode of Pensacola: Wings of Gold
- "The Wild Wild West", a 1998 episode of Rugrats
- "Wild Wild West", a 2007 episode of Taquita + Kaui
- "Wild, Wild West", a 2010 episode of Top Shot season 1
- "Wild Wild West", a 2018 episode of Bering Sea Gold
- "Wild Wild West", an episode of the 2018 season of MythBusters
- "Wild Wild West", a 2019 episode of Most Expensivest
- "Wild Wild West", a 2019 episode of Outback Opal Hunters
- "Wild Wild West", a 2020 episode of Family Guy
- "Wild Wild West", a 2020 episode of Germany's Next Topmodel season 15
- "Wild Wild West", a 2020 episode of Legendary season 1
- "Wild Wild West", a 2022 episode of Roswell, New Mexico
- "Wild Wild West", a 2024 episode of The Oval

== Gaming ==
- Wild Wild West: The Steel Assassin, a 1999 Microsoft Windows game based on the eponymous 1999 film
- The Wild Wild Wild West, a minigame in the 2001 video game Universal Studios Theme Parks Adventure

== Music ==
=== Albums and soundtracks ===
- Wild Wild West (album), a 1988 album by The Escape Club
- Wild Wild West (soundtrack), the soundtrack to the 1999 film

=== Songs ===
- "Wild, Wild West" (The Escape Club song) (1988)
- "Wild Wild West" (Kool Moe Dee song) (1988)
- "Wild Wild West" (Will Smith song) (1999)
- "Wild Wild West", a 2021 song by Adele from 30
- "Wild Wild West", a 1999 song by Chris Cummings

== Casinos ==
- Wild Wild West Gambling Hall & Hotel, a small casino in Las Vegas, Nevada
- Wild Wild West, a bar and casino expansion of Bally's Atlantic City in New Jersey

== Other uses ==
- Wild Wild West, Mayor Adam West's cousin in the American animated television series Family Guy who is voiced by Sam Elliott
- The Wild Wild West: The Night of the Iron Tyrants a comic book by Millennium Publications

== See also ==
- Aliens in the Wild, Wild West, a 1999 film
- Wild West (disambiguation)
