= Wild West (disambiguation) =

Wild West often refers to the American frontier period of the Western United States in the 19th century.

Wild West may also refer to:

== Films ==
- Wild West (serial), a 1925 film serial
- Wild West (1946 film), a film featuring Eddie Dean, Roscoe Ates and Lash LaRue
- Wild West (1992 film), a film starring Naveen Andrews

== Games ==
- Wild West (role-playing game), published by Fantasy Games Unlimited in 1981
- The Wild West (video game), a Nintendo DS video game made by Happy Happening

== Music ==
- The Wild West (album), a 2006 album by Celly Cel
- Wild West (album), a 1981 album by Dottie West
- Wild West (mixtape), a 2021 mixtape by Central Cee
- "Wild West", a 1986 song from Big World
- "Wild West", a 2017 song by Runaway June

== Television ==
- The Wild West, a 2007 BBC documentary mini-series narrated by Michael Praed
- Wild West (TV series), a 2002–2004 British TV sitcom starring Dawn French and Catherine Tate
- Wild West, a recurring fictional character in the animated TV series Family Guy

== Other uses ==
- Wild West (comics), a Western comic book series published by Atlas Comics
- Wild West Magazine, an American Old West history magazine owned by the World History Group
- Wild West shows, traveling vaudeville performances in the United States and Europe
  - Wild Westing, the term used by Native Americans for their performances with Buffalo Bill's Wild West and similar shows

== See also ==
- Old West
- Wild Wild West (disambiguation)
