= Space Invaders Extreme =

2008 video game

- North American cover art
- Developers: Taito; Backbone Entertainment (360)
- Publishers: JP: Taito; WW: Square Enix; NA: Taito (360); NA: Degica Games (Windows)
- Composer: Zuntata (Note: DS and Steam versions.)
- Series: Space Invaders
- Platforms: Nintendo DS, PlayStation Portable, Xbox 360, Windows
- Release: DS, PSP: JP: 21 February 2008; NA: 17 June 2008; EU: 4 July 2008; AU: 30 July 2008; Xbox 360: WW: 6 May 2009; Windows: WW: 12 February 2018
- Genre: Fixed shooter
- Modes: Single-player, multiplayer

Space Invaders Extreme (Note: Japanese: スペースインベーダーエクストリーム, Hepburn: Supēsu Inbēda Ekusutorīmu) (Note: stylized as SPACƎ INVADERS EXTRƎME) is a re-vamped incarnation of the arcade video game Space Invaders. Part of the Space Invaders series, the Nintendo DS and PlayStation Portable versions were released to mark the 30th anniversary of the original arcade game from 1978. An HD version was remastered and developed by Backbone Entertainment for Xbox Live Arcade with new four-player multiplayer modes and visualizer backgrounds by Jeff Minter, it was released on 6 May 2009 as a wrap-up to the 30th anniversary. The game is played at a fast pace with an electronic soundtrack and sound effects.

The game received positive reviews from critics. A sequel for the DS titled Space Invaders Extreme 2 was released in Japan on 26 March 2009, in Europe on 2 October 2009, and North America on 20 October 2009.

Space Invaders Extreme was released for Steam in North America on 12 February 2018 to mark the 40th anniversary of Space Invaders. It would later be released on PlayStation 4 and Nintendo Switch as part of Space Invaders Invincible Collection and Space Invaders Forever.

== Gameplay ==
A screenshot from an earlier build of the PSP version

=== Single player ===
The player controls a cannon at the bottom of the display (Yellow on DS and PC, Silver on PSP and Purple on Xbox 360) - this can move left or right and fire. To the top of the display formations of invaders appear - these must be shot for points and to avoid them destroying the players' cannon. Sometimes a UFO will traverse the top of the screen. This is the same basic design as Space Invaders; the player loses a life if hit, or if one of the aliens touches the ground (Nagoya Attack); but the formation of the aliens differs greatly, changing from level to level. Sometimes there are only a handful of invaders in a tight formation, sometimes individual invaders advance rapidly down the screen separately from the main formation, and sometimes a boss level will be encountered, often consisting of a very large invader and various guards. The invaders themselves have individual properties, such as firing lasers, splitting into duplicates or charging for the ground after being hit once. Bonuses for higher scores can be obtained by doing as instructed by words that flash up on the background, such as hitting invaders of a particular color or particular type.

Shooting four invaders of the same color in a row awards one of four power-ups; bomb, broad shot, laser and shield. If a different set of four is shot afterwards, a flashing UFO will appear. Shooting that accesses the Bonus Round, in which a player is given a short time to complete a certain goal, such as defeating so many aliens. If the task is completed, the game enters 'Fever Time', awarding the player with an even more powerful up for a short time, allowing the player to get through waves of enemies faster. Getting different combinations of colors can reap different bonuses, such as a roulette UFO that offers bonuses such as Freeze and Extra Player, changing all the aliens to the same color, or turning all enemies turn into UFOs that reap power ups after one hit.

The main game sees the player go through five stages, and depending on the score achieved at the end of the level 2 and beyond, the player can opt for an easier or harder route, with a total of 11 individual stages. Arcade Mode features a save and retry feature that allows players to continue and restart the game from the level they were on. Ranking mode does not feature these options, but allows players to post their scores on the online leaderboards. Stage Mode (Free Play on PC) allows the player to replay any stage they have completed. Once the main game has been cleared once, Extreme Mode is unlocked. Extreme mode is only five stages long with no branching paths, since they are more difficult than the regular stages.

=== Multiplayer ===
The Xbox Live Arcade version of the game is the first version to include four-player co-op and versus multiplayer modes. Players can compete both locally and online over Xbox Live.

On the DS, two players can compete against each other using either the Single-card download play, Multi-card play, or Nintendo WiFi Connection (via the Internet). The top screen is used to display the remote player's progress; there is also an online ranking system. The PSP version only allows local competitive play.

== Differences between versions ==
A boss fight from the DS version. The Nintendo DS version uses both screens during boss battles and bonus levels to have a tall screen.

Multiple player options for the DS version have already been mentioned above, but in gameplay terms both versions are the same, sharing the same levels, attack formations, similar graphics, and power-ups. However, the PSP version has crisper graphics due to the higher resolution implemented on the PSP. Also, while the DS version has a soundtrack composed and performed entirely by Taito's in-house sound team Zuntata, the PSP version features music from a guest group of external composers and DJs. The obvious main difference between the two is the use of the second screen on the DS version. This is used to make certain levels, specifically Bonus Rounds and Boss Battles, vertically larger. When not used for this it contains assorted information on the game currently in play. The Nintendo DS version can also use the Nintendo DS Paddle Controller which was originally designed for Arkanoid on the DS, or the DS Rumble Pack, adding force feedback to the game's music.

In addition to the peripheral support, the DS version features many modes of online play not available to its PSP counterpart; the game can be played against random players and friends over the Nintendo WiFi Connection, and top scores can also be shared over the internet. Also, single-card download play is available for local multiplayer. The PSP version only supports multiplayer locally in Ad-Hoc mode, and each player must have their own game disc. No Infrastructure modes are supported for online play or high score tables.

The Xbox Live Arcade version has many of the networking features of the DS version with the addition of a co-op mode where up to four players can play the arcade mode. It also uses background visualizers as created by Llamasoft's Jeff Minter.

The Steam version has higher quality sound effects and music that were used on the DS version of the game. However, the music for Stages 5-B and 5-C were changed. Executor was replaced with Rave Lovers from Outer Space, and Rebel Worm was replaced with Future Extreme 20XX. The announcer was changed to a more enthusiastic female voice. New voice clips included, "Stage Result," "Stage 1-A," "Stage 2-A," "Stage 1-E," "Stage 2-E," "Stage 3-E," "Stage 4-E," "Stage 5-E," "Stage 3-A," "Stage 3-B," "Stage 4-A," "Stage 4-B," "Stage 4-C," "Stage 5-A," "Stage 5-B," "Stage 5-C," "Stage 5-D," "Roulette," "3-2-1 FEVER!" "Total Result," "Great Job!" "Good!" "Excellent!" and "Great!" The default stock number was changed to 5 rather than 3, and is unable to be changed. Some waves were made easier and changed entirely in some stages, due to making an appeal to newcomers as well as casual gamers. Flash Shot was removed, being replaced with a 1,000 point bonus. Features such as "Change to UFO" now only effects the current wave instead of both the current wave and the next wave in other versions. There is no multiplayer in this version of the game, instead, it was replaced with a real-time leaderboard. A visible hitbox for the cannon was added, in which is depicted by four blue squares that spin slowly. Sound effects, voice effects, and music volume can all be adjusted in the settings. Music does not play if the game is paused. Defeating a boss rewards the player with a bonus that decreases as time goes on if the boss is not defeated. The longer the player takes to destroy the boss, the less points are rewarded when the boss is defeated. If the cannon is destroyed, the weapon level drops by one rather than by two. The maximum Rate was increased to 16, as opposed to 10 on the other versions. A wave display has been added to show the player what wave they are on. The border of the playfield flashed to the beat of the music. Rapid fire was added to allow players to keep firing to the beat.

== Downloadable content ==
Downloadable content was announced for the Xbox Live Arcade version of Space Invaders Extreme on June 17, due on the 18th of the same month. It includes three new stages, with new enemies and bosses, and two emulators, allowing the play of the original arcade versions of Space Invaders and Space Invaders Part II.

== Reception ==
Reception

Aggregate score
Aggregator	Score
Metacritic	(DS) 85/100 (PSP) 84/100 (X360) 80/100 (PC) 79/100

Review scores
Publication	Score
1Up.com	(DS) A− (PSP) A−
Game Informer	(DS) 8.25/10 (PSP) 8.25/10
GameSpot	(DS) 7.5/10
GameTrailers	9/10
IGN	(DS) 9/10 (PSP) 8.5/10

The game has enjoyed critical praise since its release. The game is noted for its fast-paced gameplay with IGN claiming the game "[is] energetic and addictive, and does an absolutely fantastic job retaining the old-school charm of the original 1978 classic"; however, IGN scored the PSP version of the game slightly lower due to its lack of online play and score sharing. GameSpot stated that "the gameplay has been improved" over the original. 1UP.com called the single-player mode "engrossing" and GameSpot later concludes that "Space Invaders Extreme is a very good example of how to update a classic game".

Both versions of Space Invaders Extreme were listed as the best shooter game for their respective consoles by IGN. IGN also awarded the DS version as having the best artistic design and best original score, as well as being best shooter for the DS.

== Legacy ==
Space Invaders Extreme 2 was released in Japan on 26 March 2009, 2 October 2009 in Europe and on 20 October 2009 in North America. There is a large amount of new content, such as new stages, boss formations, time attack mode and a 'bingo' system. The announcer voice was changed to an enthusiastic male voice, which sounds like a game show announcer.

Also, in Japan, a mini version was released to DSiWare called Space Invaders Extreme Z, which has no multiplayer or online WiFi rankings.
