= Glucoboy =

Accessory for Nintendo devices

- Manufacturer: Guidance Interactive Healthcare
- Type: Blood glucose monitor
- Generation: Sixth
- Released: 14 November 2007

The Glucoboy is a medical device developed by Guidance Interactive Healthcare as a removable accessory for the Nintendo Game Boy Advance. The device is a blood glucose monitor targeted at children with diabetes that provides users with incentives to monitor their blood glucose levels through the use of games and points. Advertised as the "first medical device to interface with a Nintendo Game Boy", the Glucoboy received retrospective attention for its innovative and unusual use as a peripheral for handheld devices.

A successor to the Glucoboy called the Didget was released by Bayer HealthCare for the Nintendo DS in 2009 in the UK and 2010 in the US.

== Description ==
The Glucoboy is a blood glucose monitor targeted for use by children with diabetes, with hardware that fits into the cartridge port of a Game Boy Advance or Nintendo DS Lite. Glucoboy software aims to assist users with diabetes management by providing points when they perform a blood glucose test and additional points when blood glucose levels are within target ranges. These points can be used on the software's Guidance Reward Platform: a reward system for monitoring compliance that allows users to unlock additional games or accessories and apparel for the games on the software. The Glucoboy contains two games: Knock 'em Downs, an action RPG set in a fair, and Lost Star Saga, a sci-fi themed turn-based RPG. In both games, power-ups and items are unlocked through the use of the Glucoboy.

== History ==
The Glucoboy was developed by Guidance Interactive, an entity managed by Minnesota-based director Paul Wessel. Wessel developed the concept after noticing that his son, who had been diagnosed with diabetes, carried his Game Boy with him when travelling. Wessel stated the concept was based on a way to "marry the two types of media together - a medical testing device and a gaming system - to make testing blood sugar levels fun". Wessell patented the idea in 2003, and following several years of pitches to investors, in 2006, he received $1.5 million from an Australian investment bank and London investment group to pilot a limited commercial release in Australia. The peripheral was launched in Australia on 14 November 2007 in concurrence with World Diabetes Day, and sold around 70,000 units, according to Wessel. Following release, Bayer Diabetes Care acquired Guidance Interactive Healthcare after expressing interest in the company. Bayer subsequently released a similar peripheral, Didget, for the Nintendo DS and Nintendo DS Lite in 2009 in the UK and 2010 in the US. In 2023, the software for the Glucoboy was located and its ROM image was preserved online.
