= Arkanoid DS =

2008 video game

- North American cover art
- Developer(s): Taito
- Publisher(s): JP: Taito; WW: Square Enix
- Series: Arkanoid
- Platform(s): Nintendo DS
- Release: JP: December 6, 2007; NA: June 17, 2008; PAL: July 4, 2008
- Genre(s): Breakout
- Mode(s): Single-player, multiplayer

Arkanoid DS is a breakout video game developed and published by Taito for the Nintendo DS, with Square Enix handling publication outside Japan. It was released on December 6, 2007.

== Gameplay ==
Arkanoid DS has two modes: a traditional Clear mode and an objective based Quest mode. In both of those, the player takes the controls of the Vaus spaceship.

Clear mode is made of 28 worlds that are arranged in a pyramid-like shape, each made up to five levels. Like in the other games from Arkanoid series, the main goal of each Clear level is to clear the entire display of blocks at the top of the screen, using a paddle to bounce a ball which destroys them. Eventually the ball falls back down, so the player has to make it hit the paddle. Sometimes, power-ups (like catch, allowing the paddle to hold the ball temporarily) will drop after a certain block has been destroyed. It is activated once the player catches it before it disappears into the void (if the last ball drops there, a life is lost).

However, in Quest mode, the player can attempt to complete any level in any preferred order, while trying to complete objectives specific for each level (time limit, restrictive number of balls). Arkanoid DS supports multiplayer mode through either local wireless or online play for up to four people in two different modes. Those are: Bust All mode (clearing a level first) and Bust Color mode (destroying all of the blocks of a specified color first). The levels played on are randomly selected and the players can keep an eye on the opponents via small images that appear in the play area.

The game released in Japan with the Paddle Controller, a spinner mimicking the original arcade game's control knob for the left and right motion of the on-screen paddle. The game uses a "two screens-one display" design, where the screen is bordered within walls. It is one of the control schemes, which includes dragging with the stylus and using a directional pad.

There is also a level and blocks customization option included that uses other games from Taito. For example, the blocks can be changed to look like Space Invaders ones or backgrounds to feature Bubble Bobble characters. The soundtrack was made by Zuntata, Taito's in-house team, using techno music to complement the action on the screen.
