= The Wild West (video game) =

2007 video game

- Developer: Happy Happening
- Publisher: Majesco
- Platform: Nintendo DS
- Release: NA: August 28, 2007
- Genre: Shoot 'em up
- Mode: Single-player

The Wild West (Note: Known in Japan as Wild West (Japanese: ワイルドウェスト, Hepburn: Wairudou~esuto)) is a shoot 'em up video game developed by Happy Happening and published by Majesco. Though anime-styled, it was released for the Nintendo DS in North America on August 28, 2007. The game takes place in the eponymous Wild West and features two anthropomorphic animal protagonists, a male lupine bounty hunter named Wolfy and a female cheetah gunslinger named Catty, as they fight through hordes of enemies led by a criminal named Terano in order to get revenge. While the game's graphics, character design and music were all praised by critics, the gameplay and story were universally panned as low-quality, resulting in poor reception.

== Gameplay ==
Cutscene featuring Catty (left) and Terano (right), with their sprites depicted on the top screen and character portraits and dialog on the bottom screen.

The game is largely touchscreen-based, and combines top-down 2D shooter sections with third-person 3D stages, interspersed by visual novel-style cutscene segments. The 3D stages do not allow character control, and are most similar to light gun games such as Time Crisis. At the end of each level is a boss.

== Plot ==
The game takes place in an anthropomorphic animal version of the Old West, set around 1840. The two main protagonists, Wolfy and Catty, who are not playable at the same time, both have a vendetta against Terano, a lizard and the leader of a criminal gang.

== Reception ==
Reception

Aggregate score
Aggregator	Score
Metacritic	35/100

Review scores
Publication	Score
GameZone	4.4/10
IGN	3.5/10
Nintendo Power	3.5/10

The game received an aggregate score of 35/100 on Metacritic, indicating "generally unfavorable reviews".

Dylan Platt of GameZone gave the game 4.4/10 points, its highest score overall, remarking that the idea behind the game was interesting, although it was let down by poor execution, and comparing it to an "enthusiastic amateur effort" rather than a polished piece of software. He criticized the game's difficulty, saying the large amounts of enemies made it hard to dodge their shots and ultimately calling it unfair. While calling the characters "well-designed" and "detailed", he nevertheless remarked that the world itself was "flat and featureless". He also criticized the game's implementation of lives as further adding to the difficulty.

Jack DeVries of IGN rated the game 3.5/10 points, criticizing nearly every aspect of the game besides its character design. He called the art style inconsistent, the difficulty unforgiving, and controls clunky, describing the game as a "painful montage of [...] dying over and over again". Nintendo Power also rated the game 3.5/10, calling the unlockable minigames "a good bonus", but not enough to endure playing the game itself.
