= Space Invaders Extreme 2 =

2009 video game

- European box art
- Developer: Project Just
- Publishers: JP: Taito; WW: Square Enix
- Series: Space Invaders
- Engine: Space Invaders Extreme
- Platform: Nintendo DS
- Release: JP: March 26, 2009; EU: October 2, 2009; NA: October 20, 2009
- Genre: Shooter
- Modes: Single-player, multiplayer

Space Invaders Extreme 2 (Japanese: スペースインベーダーエクストリーム2, Hepburn: Supēsu Inbēda Ekusutorīmu Tsū) (stylized as SPACƎ INVADERS EXTRƎME 2) is the sequel to Space Invaders Extreme. Space Invaders Extreme 2 features new content compared to its predecessor. A cut-down version of the game called Space Invaders Extreme Z has been made available on DSiWare (Japan only) for 500 Points.

== Gameplay ==
Space Invaders Extreme 2 has similar gameplay to its predecessor, such as the switching weapons, Fever Time, chaining, Bingo Fevers, and more. However, there are several changes and new systems in the game:

=== Modes ===
There are now three modes, Score Attack, Ranking, and the brand-new Time Attack. In Score Attack, the goal is to get as many points as possible, while in Time Attack, the goal is to finish as fast as possible. Ranking Mode is still the same as it was in the first game where the player must reach any of the 5-x stages and defeat the final boss without using a continue and not running out of stock.

A new 'Beginner' mode has been added to the Score Attack mode. This only allows the player to play through the easiest set of stages in the game with infinite lives.

If you beat every level in Score Attack mode on Normal difficulty, a new difficulty, Extreme, is unlocked. Gameplay in Extreme is much more difficult with harder formations to destroy, brand-new Invader types not seen in Normal difficulty, and harder variations of bosses. Additionally, there are now branching stages for Extreme starting at Stage 4-x.

=== The Bingo system and Fever Time ===
The Fever system has been changed for SIE2. The general way to get Fever Time is still the same, hit four aliens of the same color and then four more of the same color to send over a flashing UFO, which starts a Round upon being shot. Unlike the first game, SIE2 does not discriminate alien shapes. The player only has to worry about colors.

However, unlike the previous game, the 'Round' takes place in the top screen, and can be shot past the top of the bottom screen to reach the other screen. The round is won by eliminating the enemies in the top screen in under 30 seconds, which activates Fever Time.

Fever Time also works differently in SIE2. White UFOs fly around in the top screen, and the normal waves of the current stage (albeit in a gold color) are on the bottom screen. During this time, you are locked into using the last shot upgrade you received for the duration of Fever Time. Shooting the UFOs destroys them, and shooting the gold aliens offers gold items. UFOs and gold items destroyed and collected respectively increase your bonus for the Fever Time.

This will fill in a 'Bingo' slot. On the top screen, there is a 'Bingo' card, with a three by three pattern. Each square has an internal and external color. If you get to a Fever Time, the slot is filled in (e.g., if you hit four red then four green aliens, the red block with green inside is filled in). If the block you fill in is already filled in, it unlocks a bonus not related to the Bingo, such as the Roulette UFO or the Change to UFO bonuses.

Making a line of three blocks on the 'Bingo' card unlocks a special Round, and if it is beaten, a special Fever Time occurs, known as Bingo Fever. The UFOs are colored gold as well as the stages' aliens, and a pink UFO appears which drops a large pink item worth 30,000 points. Regardless of your previous weapon, Bingo Fevers force the player to use the most powerful iteration of the Bomb powerup.

Two lines can also be made at the same time, which enables Two Lines Fever, with three pink UFOs per UFO wave. The player will have a special Broad Shot that is double the normal width per shot, having six bullets per shot rather than the normal five.

The last and hardest to achieve Bingo set is Full House Fever, with a giant UFO being blocked by 200pt Invaders, half of which have an unbreakable barrier. If enough damage is accumulated on the giant UFO, you will get a Jackpot, and every time you hit the UFO from that point onwards makes it drop out a pink item. The player has an all-penetrating Laser that's twice the normal width in the game during this Fever Time. Also, this Fever Time doesn't last as long if the UFO is not fully damaged within the time limit (not seen).

The Shield powerup is the only Fever Time not to have a Bingo variant.

=== Other changes ===
There are several new wave patterns, backgrounds, music tracks and bosses in SIE2 as well as a commentator which you hear when the player achieves certain goals. This male voice also serves to provides words of encouragement and congratulations. However, as in a possible throwback to the last game, the first stage background pattern from Extreme 1 is visible in the background in the menu screens.

The number of points that is required for different ranks has been heightened significantly - however, it is also easier to earn extra points, due to the 'Rank' stat now able to reach a x16 level.

Black-colored invaders enable special effects from the previous games' Roulette, which has fewer effects this time. Shooting the following colors enables a special effect:

- Black/Blue: All invaders freeze in place for a short period of time.
- Black/Red: All invaders change to UFO. UFO invaders immediately drop any powerup if they are not colored white.
- Black/Green: A roulette is started and the player ALWAYS has a chance to earn an extra life or none at all. There are frequent occurrences of these two colors showing up in progressively difficult stages. Additionally, if the player is on their final stock and gets a roulette, the roulette wheel changes to have every slot but one to have an extra stock. The remaining slot is a massive point bonus.

A few changes are also made in Multiplayer; If you shoot a Round Feature like you would do in the single player mode, a large UFO will appear on screen. Upon hitting it, it will send the wave along with a large alien. Also, a UFO count is shown in-game, and if that count drops to zero, a flashing UFO will appear on screen randomly. Upon being hit, this will send a giant UFO over at your opponent. The AI used in the 'VS Com' mode has also been improved to include multiple difficulties. The background has also been changed. Instead of a black background, artwork for the original Space Invaders can be seen. Also, in certain waves a gold '200pt' invader (normally seen in single-player Fever Time) can be destroyed, giving out a gold item. This gives you the Broad Shot from Two-Line Fever. Interesting to point out is that the music played in Multiplayer is taken from the previous game, entitled "Zero Hour", the music from Stage 5D.
