= List of Capcom games: T–Z =

This is a list of video games by Capcom organized alphabetically by name. The list may also include ports that were developed and published by others companies under license from Capcom.

| Title | System | Release date | Developer(s) | JP | NA | EU | AUS | Ref(s) |
|---|---|---|---|---|---|---|---|---|
| Taisen Net Gimmick Capcom & Psikyo All Stars | Dreamcast | 2000 | Capcom | Yes | | | | |
| TaleSpin | Game Boy | December 1991 | Dual Corporation | | Yes | Yes | Yes | |
| TaleSpin | Nintendo Entertainment System | December 1991 | Capcom | | Yes | Yes | | |
| Talisman | Microsoft Windows | Cancelled | Big Rooster | | | | | |
| Talisman | PlayStation 3 | Cancelled | Big Rooster | | | | | |
| Talisman | Xbox 360 | Cancelled | Big Rooster | | | | | |
| Tatsunoko vs. Capcom: Cross Generation of Heroes | Arcade | December 2008 | Eighting | Yes | | | | |
| Tatsunoko vs. Capcom: Cross Generation of Heroes | Wii | December 11, 2008 | Eighting | Yes | | | | |
| Tatsunoko vs. Capcom: Ultimate All-Stars | Wii | January 26, 2010 | Eighting | Yes | Yes | Yes | Yes | |
| Tech Romancer | Arcade | March 31, 2000 | Capcom | Yes | Yes | Yes | Yes | |
| Tech Romancer | Dreamcast | March 31, 2000 | Capcom | Yes | Yes | Yes | Yes | |
| The Great Ace Attorney: Adventures | Nintendo 3DS | July 9, 2015 | Capcom | Yes | | | | |
| The Great Ace Attorney: Adventures | Android (operating system) | August 30, 2017 | Capcom | Yes | | | | |
| The Great Ace Attorney: Adventures | iOS | August 31, 2017 | Capcom | Yes | | | | |
| The Great Ace Attorney: Adventures | Microsoft Windows | July 27, 2021 | Capcom | Yes | Yes | Yes | Yes | |
| The Great Ace Attorney: Adventures | Nintendo Switch | July 27, 2021 | Capcom | Yes | Yes | Yes | Yes | |
| The Great Ace Attorney: Adventures | PlayStation 4 | July 27, 2021 | Capcom | Yes | Yes | Yes | Yes | |
| The Great Ace Attorney 2: Resolve | Nintendo 3DS | August 3, 2017 | Capcom | Yes | | | | |
| The Great Ace Attorney 2: Resolve | Android (operating system) | April 24, 2018 | Capcom | Yes | | | | |
| The Great Ace Attorney 2: Resolve | iOS | April 24, 2018 | Capcom | Yes | | | | |
| The Great Ace Attorney 2: Resolve | Microsoft Windows | July 27, 2021 | Capcom | Yes | Yes | Yes | Yes | |
| The Great Ace Attorney 2: Resolve | Nintendo Switch | July 27, 2021 | Capcom | Yes | Yes | Yes | Yes | |
| The Great Ace Attorney 2: Resolve | PlayStation 4 | July 27, 2021 | Capcom | Yes | Yes | Yes | Yes | |
| The King of Dragons | Arcade | July 11, 1991 | Capcom | Yes | Yes | | | |
| The King of Dragons | CPS Changer | July 11, 1991 | Capcom | Yes | Yes | | | |
| The King of Dragons | Super Nintendo Entertainment System | March 4, 1994 | Capcom | Yes | Yes | | | |
| The Legend of Zelda: A Link to the Past and Four Swords | Game Boy Advance | December 2, 2002 | Nintendo/Capcom | Yes | Yes | Yes | | |
| The Legend of Zelda: Oracle of Ages | Game Boy Color | February 27, 2001 | Capcom/Flagship | Yes | Yes | Yes | | |
| The Legend of Zelda: Oracle of Seasons | Game Boy Color | February 27, 2001 | Capcom/Flagship | Yes | Yes | Yes | | |
| The Legend of Zelda: The Minish Cap | Game Boy Advance | November 4, 2004 | Capcom/Flagship | Yes | Yes | Yes | Yes | |
| The Little Mermaid | Nintendo Entertainment System | July 19, 1991 | Capcom | Yes | Yes | | | |
| The Little Mermaid | Game Boy | 1992 | Capcom | | Yes | Yes | | |
| The Magical Ninja: Jiraiya Kenzan! | PlayStation 2 | Cancelled | Capcom | | | | | |
| The Misadventures of Tron Bonne | PlayStation | July 22, 1999 | Capcom | Yes | Yes | Yes | | |
| The Maw | PlayStation | December 31, 2009 | Twisted Pixel Games | Yes | Yes | Yes | Yes | |
| The Maw | PlayStation Vita | October 30, 2009 | Bluepin | Yes | Yes | Yes | Yes | |
| The Nightmare Before Christmas: Oogie's Revenge | PlayStation 2 | October 21, 2004 | Capcom | Yes | Yes | Yes | | |
| The Nightmare Before Christmas: Oogie's Revenge | Xbox | September 30, 2005 | Capcom | | Yes | Yes | | |
| The Punisher | Arcade | April 22, 1993 | Capcom | | Yes | Yes | | |
| The Punisher | Sega Mega Drive/Genesis | June 1, 1994 | Sculptured Software | | Yes | Yes | | |
| The Speed Rumbler | Arcade | September 1986 | Capcom | Yes | Yes | | | |
| Three Wonders | Arcade | May 20, 1991 | Capcom | Yes | Yes | Yes | | |
| Three Wonders | PlayStation | 1998 | Capcom | Yes | Yes | Yes | | |
| Three Wonders | Sega Saturn | 1998 | Capcom | Yes | Yes | Yes | | |
| Tiger Road | Amiga | | | | Yes | | | |
| Tiger Road | Atari ST | | | | Yes | | | |
| Tiger Road | Arcade | November 1987 | Capcom | | Yes | | | |
| Tiger Road | Commodore 64 | | | | Yes | | | |
| Tiger Road | TurboGrafx-16 | | | | Yes | | | |
| Tiger Road | ZX Spectrum | | | | Yes | | | |
| Toki Tori | Game Boy Color | September 21, 2001 | Two Tribes B.V. | | Yes | Yes | Yes | |
| Tomb Raider: The Last Revelation | Dreamcast | March 24, 2000 | Core Design | | Yes | Yes | | |
| Toy Story | Super Nintendo Entertainment System | December 1995 | Traveller's Tales | Yes | Yes | Yes | Yes | |
| Trick'N Snowboarder | PlayStation | February 1999 | CAVE | Yes | Yes | Yes | | |
| Trojan | Arcade | April 1986 | Capcom | Yes | Yes | Yes | | |
| Trojan | DOS | | Pacific Dataworks International | Yes | Yes | Yes | | |
| Trojan | Nintendo Entertainment System | December 24, 1986 | Capcom | Yes | Yes | Yes | | |
| Trouballs | Game Boy Color | October 5, 2001 | Paragon Five, Inc. | Yes | Yes | Yes | Yes | |
| Turok | Microsoft Windows | February 5, 2008 | Propaganda Games | | Yes | Yes | Yes | |
| U.N. Squadron | Amiga | | | Yes | Yes | Yes | Yes | |
| U.N. Squadron | Atari ST | | | Yes | Yes | Yes | Yes | |
| U.N. Squadron | Arcade | August 1989 | Capcom | Yes | Yes | Yes | Yes | |
| U.N. Squadron | Commodore 64 | | | Yes | Yes | Yes | Yes | |
| U.N. Squadron | Super Nintendo Entertainment System | July 1991 | | | Yes | Yes | Yes | |
| U.N. Squadron | ZX Spectrum | | | Yes | Yes | Yes | Yes | |
| Ultimate Fighting Championship | Dreamcast | August 29, 2000 | Anchor Inc. | Yes | Yes | Yes | | |
| Ultimate Ghosts 'n Goblins | PlayStation Portable | August 13, 2006 | Tose | Yes | Yes | Yes | Yes | |
| Ultimate Marvel vs. Capcom 3 | PlayStation 3 | November 15, 2011 | Capcom/Eighting | Yes | Yes | Yes | | |
| Ultimate Marvel vs. Capcom 3 | PlayStation Vita | December 17, 2011 | Capcom/Eighting | Yes | Yes | Yes | | |
| Ultimate Marvel vs. Capcom 3 | Xbox 360 | November 15, 2011 | Capcom/Eighting | Yes | Yes | Yes | | |
| Ultimate Marvel vs. Capcom 3 | PlayStation 4 | December 3, 2016 | Capcom/Eighting | Yes | Yes | Yes | Yes | |
| Ultimate Marvel vs. Capcom 3 | Microsoft Windows | March 7, 2017 | Capcom/Eighting | Yes | Yes | Yes | Yes | |
| Ultimate Marvel vs. Capcom 3 | Xbox One | March 7, 2017 | Capcom/Eighting | Yes | Yes | Yes | Yes | |
| Umbrella Corps | Microsoft Windows | June 21, 2016 | Capcom | Yes | Yes | Yes | Yes | |
| Umbrella Corps | PlayStation 4 | June 21, 2016 | Capcom | Yes | Yes | Yes | Yes | |
| Under the Skin | PlayStation 2 | August 5, 2004 | Capcom | Yes | Yes | Yes | Yes | |
| Vampire Chronicles for Matching Service | Dreamcast | August 10, 2000 | Capcom | Yes | | | | |
| Vampire Hunter 2 | Arcade | 1997 | Capcom | Yes | Yes | | | |
| Vampire Savior | Arcade | May 1997 | Capcom | Yes | Yes | | | |
| Vampire Savior | Sega Saturn | April 16, 1998 | Capcom | Yes | | | | |
| Vampire Savior | PlayStation | November 5, 1998 | Capcom | Yes | Yes | Yes | | |
| Vampire Savior | PlayStation 2 | May 19, 2005 | Capcom | Yes | | | | |
| Vampire Savior | PlayStation 3 | April 24, 2012 | Capcom | Yes | Yes | Yes | Yes | |
| Vampire Savior | PlayStation Vita | April 24, 2012 | Capcom | Yes | Yes | Yes | Yes | |
| Vampire Savior | PlayStation Network | April 24, 2012 | Capcom | Yes | Yes | Yes | Yes | |
| Vampire Savior 2 | Arcade | 1997 | Capcom | Yes | Yes | | | |
| Vampire: Darkstalkers Collection | PlayStation 2 | May 19, 2005 | Capcom | Yes | Yes | Yes | | |
| Varth: Operation Thunderstorm | Arcade | June 12, 1992 | Capcom | Yes | Yes | Yes | Yes | |
| Viewtiful Joe | GameCube | June 26, 2003 | Capcom | Yes | Yes | Yes | | |
| Viewtiful Joe | PlayStation 2 | August 24, 2004 | Capcom | Yes | Yes | Yes | | |
| Viewtiful Joe 2 | GameCube | November 18, 2004 | Clover Studio | Yes | Yes | Yes | Yes | |
| Viewtiful Joe 2 | PlayStation 2 | December 8, 2004 | Clover Studio | Yes | Yes | Yes | Yes | |
| Viewtiful Joe: Double Trouble! | Nintendo DS | November 2, 2005 | Clover Studio | Yes | Yes | Yes | Yes | |
| Viewtiful Joe: Red Hot Rumble | GameCube | September 29, 2005 | Clover Studio | Yes | Yes | Yes | Yes | |
| Viewtiful Joe: Red Hot Rumble | PlayStation Portable | March 22, 2006 | Clover Studio | Yes | Yes | Yes | Yes | |
| Vulgus | Arcade | May 1984 | Capcom | Yes | Yes | | | |
| Wantame Music Channel: Doko Demo Style | Nintendo DS | 2007 | Capcom | Yes | | | | |
| War of the Grail | Arcade | Cancelled | Capcom | | | | | |
| Warauinu no Bouken GB: Silly Go Lucky! | Game Boy Color | 2001 | Capcom | Yes | | | | |
| Warriors of Fate | Arcade | October 2, 1992 | Capcom | Yes | Yes | Yes | Yes | |
| Warriors of Fate | TurboGrafx-CD | October 2, 1992 | Capcom | Yes | Yes | Yes | Yes | |
| Warriors of Fate II | CPS Changer | November 1992 | Capcom | Yes | Yes | | | |
| Warriors of Fate II | PlayStation | March 22, 1996 | Capcom | Yes | | | | |
| Warriors of Fate II | Sega Saturn | September 6, 1996 | Capcom | Yes | | | | |
| Way of the Samurai 2 | PlayStation 2 | May 21, 2004 | Acquire/Spike | | Yes | Yes | Yes | |
| We Love Golf! | Wii | December 13, 2007 | Camelot Software Planning | Yes | Yes | Yes | Yes | |
| Who Framed Roger Rabbit | Game Boy | November 1, 1991 | Capcom | | Yes | Yes | | |
| Who Wants to Be a Millionaire? | iOS | January 14, 2009 | Capcom | | Yes | Yes | Yes | |
| Willow | Arcade | June 1989 | Capcom | Yes | Yes | Yes | Yes | |
| Willow | Nintendo Entertainment System | July 18, 1989 | Capcom | Yes | Yes | Yes | Yes | |
| Wily & Right no RockBoard: That's Paradise | Nintendo Entertainment System | January 15, 1993 | Capcom | Yes | | | | |
| Without Warning | Xbox | October 28, 2005 | Circle Studio | | Yes | Yes | | |
| Wizardry V | Super Nintendo Entertainment System | 1988 | Sir-Tech | Yes | Yes | | | |
| Wolf of the Battlefield: Commando 3 | PlayStation Network | June 5, 2008 | Backbone Entertainment | | Yes | Yes | Yes | |
| Wolf of the Battlefield: Commando 3 | Xbox Live Marketplace | June 25, 2008 | Backbone Entertainment | | Yes | Yes | Yes | |
| World Gone Sour | Microsoft Windows | 2011 | Playbrains | | Yes | Yes | | |
| World Gone Sour | PlayStation Network | April 10, 2012 | Playbrains | | Yes | | | |
| World Gone Sour | Xbox Live Marketplace | April 11, 2012 | Playbrains | | Yes | | | |
| X-Men vs. Street Fighter | Arcade | September 1996 | Capcom | Yes | Yes | Yes | Yes | |
| X-Men vs. Street Fighter | Sega Saturn | November 27, 1997 | Capcom | Yes | | | | |
| X-Men vs. Street Fighter EX Edition | PlayStation | February 26, 1998 | Capcom | Yes | Yes | Yes | | |
| X-Men: Children of the Atom | Arcade | December 1994 | Capcom | Yes | Yes | | | |
| X-Men: Children of the Atom | DOS | May 31, 1997 | Capcom | | Yes | Yes | | |
| X-Men: Children of the Atom | PlayStation | February 1998 | Capcom | | Yes | Yes | | |
| X-Men: Children of the Atom | Sega Saturn | November 22, 1995 | Capcom | Yes | Yes | Yes | | |
| X-Men: Mutant Apocalypse | Super Nintendo Entertainment System | November 1994 | Capcom | Yes | Yes | Yes | | |
| X2: No Relief | PlayStation | August 1997 | Capcom | Yes | | | | |
| Yo! Noid | Nintendo Entertainment System | March 16, 1990 | Now Production | Yes | Yes | | | |
| Zack & Wiki: Quest for Barbaros' Treasure | Wii | October 23, 2007 | Capcom | Yes | Yes | Yes | Yes | |
| Zombie Cafe | iOS | May 20, 2013 | Beeline Interactive Inc. | | Yes | Yes | Yes | |
