= Capcom Arcade Cabinet =

2013 video game compilation

- Developer: M2
- Publisher: Capcom
- Platforms: PlayStation 3, Xbox 360
- Release: NA: February 19, 2013; JP: February 19, 2013; AU: February 20, 2013; EU: February 20, 2013
- Genre: Various
- Modes: Single-player, multiplayer

Capcom Arcade Cabinet is a video game compilation developed by M2 and published by Capcom in 2013 for the PlayStation 3 and Xbox 360. The compilation comprises 17 games initially released by Capcom between 1984 and 1987, which were distributed in five separate packs of three games during February–April 2013, with two additional games unlocked for customers that purchased all five packs. An arcade machine was made to promote the Capcom Arcade Cabinet series at the Gadget Show Live 2013 in Birmingham, United Kingdom. This was followed by Capcom Arcade Stadium.

== Games ==
The compilation includes 15 games which were released throughout 2013. Games can be purchased individually or as part of five downloadable content packs, subdivided by the included games' year of release. The first pack, the "1987 Pack", was released on February 19 for the PlayStation 3 and February 20 for the Xbox 360, and contains 1943, Black Tiger, and Avengers. The second pack, the "1985-I Pack", was released on March 5, and includes Gun.Smoke, Ghosts 'n Goblins, and Section Z. The third pack, the "1986 Pack", was released on March 19, consisting of Hyper Dyne Side Arms, Legendary Wings, and Trojan. The fourth pack, the "1985-II Pack", was released April 2 for the Xbox 360 and April 3 for the PlayStation 3, and features The Speed Rumbler, Commando and Savage Bees. The fifth and final pack, the "1984 Pack", was released on April 16, and adds SonSon, 1942, and Pirate Ship Higemaru.

An "all-in-one" pack containing all 15 games was released on May 20, 2013. Two bonus games, 1943 Kai (1987) and Vulgus (1984), are unlocked if all other games are purchased.

== Reception ==
Reception

Aggregate score
Aggregator	Score
Metacritic	69/100 (PS3); 68/100 (X360)

Capcom Arcade Cabinet received "mixed or average" reviews from critics according to review aggregator Metacritic. Comic Book Resources lamented this compilation having started Capcom into following Nintendo's trend of emulation "retreads", saying this: "Beyond the price, the collection's lack of big name titles and a general lack of excitement over another retro game collection put it in the middle of the pack. ... The downside is that these companies have normalized the practice of re-selling consumers classic games every console generation, and that's a price gamers shouldn't have to pay."
