= Pirate Ship Higemaru =

1984 video game

- Developer: Capcom
- Publisher: Capcom
- Designer: Tokuro Fujiwara
- Programmer: Toshio Arima
- Composer: Tamayo Kawamoto
- Platforms: Arcade, Saturn, PlayStation, PlayStation 2, PSP, Xbox
- Release: Arcade: JP: September 1984
- Genre: Maze
- Modes: Single-player, multiplayer
- Arcade system: Capcom Z80-based

Pirate Ship Higemaru (Note: Japanese: ひげ丸, Hepburn: Higemaru) is a 1984 maze video game developed and published by Capcom for arcades. The gameplay is similar to that of Sega's 1982 game Pengo, but with the arctic theme replaced with that of a pirate ship.

The game was later included in the 1998 compilation Capcom Generations: The First Generation for the PlayStation (in Japan and Europe) and Sega Saturn (Japan only). Like the other games in the Capcom Generations titles, it was included in the 2005 compilation Capcom Classics Collection for the PlayStation 2 and Xbox, and in the PlayStation Portable version Capcom Classics Collection: Reloaded, which was the first time the game was released for home consoles in North America.

== Gameplay ==
Gameplay of Higemaru

The player controls a sailor, by the name of Momotaru, who must use barrels to defeat the titular pirate crew. Momotaru has no attacks of his own, but he has the ability to grab barrels, drums, large bags, and various other items which he can throw (either horizontally or vertically) across the screen. Any pirate who stands in the way of a barrel or other object will be hurled off the screen. Barrels that impact the walls of a stage or other barrels or objects will shatter and produce points, while other objects are invulnerable (but do not produce points). Each successive enemy that is hit by a barrel will yield additional points once the barrel is destroyed. In addition, there are also various items hidden beneath barrels in each level which will give Momotaru bonus points. Every floor of the ship has a set number of pirates to be destroyed, as well as a single "Bows", a special pirate that regenerates each time it is defeated. Every fourth level in the game yields a bonus level in which the barrels are worth an increased number of points, and a group of enemies entirely made up of Bows (which do not regenerate in this case).

With each successive floor, the speed and intelligence of the pirates increases. For every sixteen barrels Momotaru destroys, he will be rewarded with an item that grants invincibility for a limited amount of time, allowing him to defeat enemies by simply touching them. Momotaru's enemies do not have attacks, but a single touch from an enemy will cause him to die and be revived, costing the player one extra life; the game ends when the player runs out of lives. When a player has scored more than 1 million points, the game will stop awarding the player with bonus lives. The game has no ending and loops indefinitely after level sixteen. The enemy patterns and color will reset to level one but the game will not reset the deck counter. The layout of the barrels on the stages will continue to change, however, and the enemy count per level will not reset to level one counts.

== Characters ==
- Momotaru: a sailor, Momotaru is on his own against the Higemaru pirates, only receiving help from various items laden throughout each floor.
- Higemaru: a bearded pirate wearing a bandana and striped shirt, and lacking arms and legs (propelled only by a pair of large feet). He comes in a wide assortment of colors. They tend to stay near areas where they spawn, then move cautiously about the level, stopping every so often. Later on, however, they will actively chase Momotaru and attempt to trap him.
- Bows: presumably, the captain of the Higemaru pirates he sports a beard, a hat with a skull and crossbones emblazoned on it, a hook, and a wooden leg. He wanders aimlessly around the deck.

== Legacy ==
- Pirate Ship Higemaru was the third game produced by Capcom, following Vulgus and Sonson. It is one of three Capcom games to use Z80-based technology, along with 1942 and Exed Exes.
- The Yashichi, a power-up item that frequently appears in Capcom games (especially those of the late 1980s and early 1990s), makes its second cameo appearance here. This is also the second game in which it appears as an item, following Sonson. Prior to this, it had appeared as an enemy in Vulgus.
- In Namco × Capcom, Sylphie, the item shop girl from Forgotten Worlds whose attacks are all taken from various Capcom games, has an attack in which she throws a barrel in the same style as Momotaru, a clear reference to Pirate Ship Higemaru.
- A sequel to Higemaru, subtitled Makaijima, was released for the Family Computer in Japan, with Compile developing a version for the MSX2. This game retains much of the look of the original, and many similar gameplay elements such as the ability to pick up and throw barrels at enemies, and the return of Momotaru and the pirates. The game features much more diverse gameplay such as the ability to traverse a map screen via ship, levels taking place on islands, and giant bosses, as well as a more developed plot. It also serves as a spin-off to the Ghosts 'n Goblins series; the Hebi Island, one of the stages in Makaijima, features enemy characters from the series while the title of the game complements that of the series' name in Japan (Makaimura). An English localization of this sequel was planned titled Makai Island, which was canceled, but a prototype was found.
- A Stage 3 enemy boss character featuring in Capcom's Strider is a pirate named Captain Higemaru Jr (Captain Beard Jr).
- On the Capcom Fighters Network website, there are profiles of Momotaru, Bows, and Beard from Higeru Makaijima, depicted as siblings. Additionally, Momotaru was originally planned to be playable in Street Fighter V but was scrapped for Birdie.
- The pirates make a cameo in the 2023 remake of Resident Evil 4 in the shooting range as shooting dummies.
