= Capcom Classics Collection =

2005 video game

- European Classics Collection vol. 1 cover art
- Developers: Backbone Entertainment (PS2/Xbox); Klein Computer Entertainment (PSP); Sensory Sweep (GBA)
- Publisher: Capcom
- Platforms: Game Boy Advance, PlayStation 2, PlayStation Portable, Xbox
- Release: Volume 1: PlayStation 2; NA: September 27, 2005; EU: November 18, 2005; JP: March 2, 2006 Xbox; NA: September 27, 2005; EU: November 18, 2005; Volume 2: PlayStation 2; NA: November 14, 2006; EU: April 13, 2007; AU: April 11, 2007 Xbox; NA: November 14, 2006; Remixed: PlayStation Portable; NA: March 22, 2006; EU: July 21, 2006; Reloaded: PlayStation Portable; JP: September 7, 2006; NA: October 24, 2006; EU: November 10, 2006; AU: November 16, 2006; Mini-Mix: Game Boy Advance; NA: September 19, 2006
- Genre: Various
- Modes: Single-player, multiplayer

Capcom Classics Collection (Note: Japanese: カプコン・クラシックスコレクション, Hepburn: Kapukon Kurashikkusu Korekushon) is a video game compilation developed and published by Capcom for the PlayStation 2 and Xbox. It was developed by Backbone Entertainment, Sensory Sweep, and its Japanese developer Klein Computer Entertainment. A second volume, Capcom Classics Collection Vol. 2, was released on November 14, 2006, in North America, for PlayStation 2 and Xbox. The second volume as well as the Xbox version of the first volume were not released in Japan.

Two handheld compilations, Capcom Classics Collection Remixed (not released in Japan) and Capcom Classics Collection Reloaded (Capcom Classics Collection in Japan) were released on March 22 and October 24, 2006, respectively on the PlayStation Portable. Reloaded and Remixed can also be played on the PlayStation Vita by downloading it on a PS3 and copying it via the USB transfer function to the Vita. A Game Boy Advance compilation, Capcom Classics Mini-Mix (North America only), was released on September 19, 2006. Reloaded and Mini-Mix were not developed by Digital Eclipse, but rather by Klein Computer Entertainment (which is also co-developed for Volume 1) and Sensory Sweep, respectively.

Many of the games included in this compilation were re-released as part of Capcom Arcade Cabinet for PlayStation 3 and Xbox 360 from February 19 to April 17, 2013.

== Overview ==
In 1998, Capcom produced a series of five video game compilations titled Capcom Generations for the PlayStation and Sega Saturn, released in Japan and the PAL region. The series as a whole compiled over 15 arcade games and the Super NES game Super Ghouls 'n Ghosts. Each volume was accompanied by extra features such as a historical overview of each title, artwork gallery, hints and even cast profiles. All games in these compilations also contained enhanced gameplay options such as rapid fire, a bigger screen, and remixed soundtrack.

Volume 1 of Capcom Classics Collection contains all sixteen games from Capcom Generations and Street Fighter Collection 2 respectively (converted from these ports rather than the arcade originals) and six added emulated titles.

Volume 2 only features titles not included in the Capcom Generations series, and has excluded Super Street Fighter II: The New Challengers (1993) over a copy of Block Block (1991) despite the Breakout-type game being already featured on Capcom Puzzle World (2007) for the PlayStation Portable.

As with the Capcom Generations titles, all games contain extra features, which consist of gameplay tips, artwork, listenable music and cast profiles, although the contents are not identical. All the extra features are typically unlocked by getting high scores or achieving unusual gameplay objectives, such as collecting the Yashichi item in several games or picking up Edi. E's gum in Final Fight. High scores can be saved for all the games for three different difficulty settings: Normal, Hardcore (in which only the minimum number of lives and continues are available and the AI is at its best), or Custom (if the player changes the options from the Normal or Hardcore settings).

The home console volumes feature one bonus game each. The first volume features a "Deluxe Versus Mode" for the Street Fighter II games which allows two players to compete against each other by offering the players a selection of characters from all three installments of the Street Fighter II series included in the compilation. This game mode was originally from the Street Fighter Collection 2 compilation for the PlayStation and Saturn, which are the versions emulated in Capcom Classics Collection and Reloaded. Remixed and Volume 2 contain a version of Quiz & Dragons that is exclusively composed of Capcom-related questions.

== Lineup by volume ==
=== Volume 1 ===
- 1942 (1984)
- 1943: The Battle of Midway (1987)
- 1943 Kai: Midway Kaisen (1987)
- Bionic Commando (1987)
- Commando (1985)
- Final Fight (1989)
- Forgotten Worlds (1988)
- Ghosts 'n Goblins (1985)
- Ghouls 'n Ghosts (1988)
- Gun.Smoke (1985)
- Legendary Wings (1986)
- Mercs (1990)
- Pirate Ship Higemaru (1984)
- Savage Bees (1985)
- Section Z (1985)
- SonSon (1984)
- Street Fighter II: The World Warrior (1991)
- Street Fighter II: Champion Edition (1992)
- Street Fighter II: Hyper Fighting (1992)
- Super Ghouls 'n Ghosts (SNES) (1991)
- Trojan (1986)
- Vulgus (1984)

=== Volume 2 ===
- 1941: Counter Attack (1990)
- Avengers (1987)
- Black Tiger (1987)
- Block Block (1991)
- Captain Commando (1991)
- Eco Fighters (1994)
- The King of Dragons (1991)
- Knights of the Round (1991)
- Last Duel: Inter Planet War 2012 (1988)
- Magic Sword: Heroic Fantasy (1990)
- Mega Twins (1990)
- Quiz & Dragons: Capcom Quiz Game (1992)
- Hyper Dyne Side Arms (1986)
- Street Fighter (1987)
- Strider (1989)
- Super Street Fighter II Turbo (1994)
- The Speed Rumbler (1986)
- Three Wonders (1991)
- Tiger Road (1987)
- Varth: Operation Thunderstorm (1992)

== Portable versions ==
Remixed and Reloaded, both for the PSP contain mostly the same lineup of games from the two home console volumes. Reloaded contains the 16 games respectively from the Capcom Generations and Street Fighter Collection 2 lineup plus Knights of the Round, Eco Fighters and The King of Dragons while Remixed, which came out before Reloaded, contains the majority of remaining games from the home console versions of Vol. 1 and 2. Super Street Fighter II Turbo, Tiger Road, and Trojan do not appear in the portable versions.

=== Capcom Classics Collection Remixed ===
- 1941: Counter Attack (1991)
- Avengers (1987)
- Bionic Commando (1987)
- Black Tiger (1987)
- Block Block (1991)
- Captain Commando (1991)
- Final Fight (1989)
- Forgotten Worlds (1988)
- Last Duel: Inter Planet War 2012 (1988)
- Legendary Wings (1986)
- Magic Sword: Heroic Fantasy (1990)
- Mega Twins (1990)
- Quiz & Dragons: Capcom Quiz Game (1992)
- Section Z (1985)
- Side Arms: Hyper Dyne (1986)
- The Speed Rumbler (1986)
- Street Fighter (1987)
- Strider (1989)
- Three Wonders (1991)
- Varth (1992)

=== Capcom Classics Collection Reloaded ===
- 1942 (1984)
- 1943: The Battle of Midway (1987)
- 1943 Kai: Midway Kaisen (1987)
- Commando (1985)
- Eco Fighters (1994)
- Ghosts 'n Goblins (1985)
- Ghouls 'n Ghosts (1988)
- Gun.Smoke (1985)
- The King of Dragons (1991)
- Knights of the Round (1991)
- Mercs (1990)
- Pirate Ship Higemaru (1984)
- Savage Bees (1985)
- SonSon (1984)
- Street Fighter II: The World Warrior (1991)
- Street Fighter II: Champion Edition (1992)
- Street Fighter II: Hyper Fighting (1992)
- Super Ghouls 'n Ghosts (SNES) (1991)
- Vulgus (1984)

=== Capcom Classics Mini Mix ===
Capcom Classics Mini Mix is a compilation for the Game Boy Advance that was developed by Sensory Sweep and released around the same time as the home console and PSP versions.

This GBA compilation includes three games originally released for the Nintendo Entertainment System:

- Bionic Commando (1988)
- Strider (1989)
- Mighty Final Fight (1993)

== Other collections ==
- Capcom Generations
- Capcom Puzzle World
- Capcom Arcade Cabinet
- Capcom Arcade Stadium
