= 1943: The Battle of Midway =

1987 video game

- North American arcade flyer
- Developer: Capcom
- Publisher: Capcom
- Producer: Yoshiki Okamoto
- Designer: Noritaka Funamizu
- Composer: Kumi Yamaga: 1943 Kai Manami Matsumae Takashi Tateishi Junko Tamiya Hiroshige Tonomura Tamayo Kawamoto Harumi Fujita
- Series: 194X
- Platforms: Arcade, NES, PC Engine, Atari ST, ZX Spectrum, Amstrad CPC, Commodore 64, Amiga
- Release: Arcade: JP: June 1987; NA: October 1987; NES: JP: June 20, 1988; NA: October 1988
- Genre: Scrolling shooter
- Modes: Single-player, multiplayer
- Arcade system: Capcom Commando Hardware

1943: The Battle of Midway (Note: Japanese: 1943 ミッドウェイ海戦, Hepburn: Ichi Kyū Yon San: Middowei Kaisen) is a 1987 vertically scrolling shooter video game developed and published by Capcom for arcades. It was the first follow-up to Capcom's earlier 1942. Like 1942, the player controls Americans attacking the Japanese air fleet; this was due to being one of the first Capcom games designed with Western markets in mind. The game's name is a reference to the Battle of Midway, which occurred in June 1942.

== Gameplay ==
Gameplay screenshot

The game is set in the Pacific theater of World War II, off the coast of the Midway Atoll with the Imperial Japanese Armed Forces as the main group of antagonists. The player takes the role of an unnamed U.S. Navy ace pilot seeking revenge to defeat the Japanese naval aerial forces that attacked the American aircraft carrier, destroy all Japanese air and sea forces, fly through the 16 stages of play, and ultimately destroy the battleship Yamato, the game's final boss. 11 of these stages consist of an air-to-sea battle with a battleship or an aircraft carrier as the stage boss, while 5 stages consist of an all-aerial battle, either against a squadron of multiple strategic bombers or a single heavy bomber, the latter requires the player to shoot its engines to destroy it.

As in 1942, players pilot a P-38 Lightning. Controls are also similar: button 1 fires main weapons, and button 2 performs two special actions: one of three special lightning attacks in exchange for some of the player's fuel, or a loop maneuver like in 1942 if buttons 1 and 2 are pressed simultaneously. Players now have only one life, in the form of a large "fuel" meter, constantly depleting, but refillable by collecting various powerups. In 2-player mode, when both players overlap their planes on screen, the energy bar can be transferred from the player with more fuel to the player with less. Destroying a complete formation of red enemy planes will result in a power-up, such as a health boost or a new main weapon.

There are cheat codes, different for every stage, ranging from holding down a fire button or pointing the joystick in a certain direction; player(s) are rewarded with fully upgraded weapons.

Attacks and Items

There are a number of different weapons, attacks, and items the player can use in total.

Weapons

There are 6 different weapons in the game. The player comes equipped with a standard weapon at all times unless a power up is obtained by destroying a group of red planes, in which case the player will have a chance to receive a special weapon. The power up can also be cycled to various weapons by shooting it. Weapons include:

- Standard Machine Gun: The player comes first equipped with this. Two shots are fired simultaneously when the fire button is pressed.
- Shotgun: Shoots a wide, short-ranged, shot of bullets. These bullets can also destroy enemy fire. If a second shotgun power-up is obtained it will increase its power
- Three-way MG: Like the standard MG but will also shoot bullets diagonally allowing for wider spread.
- Auto: Will shoot a short burst of eight bullets with every press of the fire button.
- Shell: The shell, sometimes referred to as the Super Shell, will shoot a single line of shells with no spread. A wider spread can be obtained through the side fighter item. The shell is powerful and requires good accuracy and is the only weapon that can be continuously shot with the fire button being pressed down.
- Laser: A rare item that shoots a powerful piercing laser. This item can be obtained by collecting the maneki-neko (beckoning cat) that will flash around the screen.

Special Attacks

There are three separate special attacks that the player can use by pressing the B button. Each attack uses a chunk of energy from the player. Using the attack cannot kill the player but instead the player will be unable to use the attack when low on energy.

- Lighting Attack: Only usable during the air section of the game. This attack instantly destroys any small air targets.
- Tsunami Attack: Only usable during the surface attacks, it destroys all small air targets, damages ships, and stops the screen from scrolling for a few seconds.
- Cyclone: Destroys all enemy fire.

Items

There are five separate items that can be obtained through playing:

- POW: POWs can be obtained by destroying a group of red planes. A POW will restore 8 of the players energy.
- Energy tank: An energy tank can be obtained by shooting a POW or weapon enough to cycle it to the energy tank. The energy tank will restore 24 of the player's energy.
- Yashichi: Can be obtained by shooting special locations or obtained rarely by shooting a fighter under certain circumstances. This will completely refill the player's energy bar.
- Star: A rare item to appear, more rare than the Yashichi. It will reset the special weapon timer to max and give the player 5,000 points.
- Side fighters: Adds two fighters to the side of the player that add to the projectile amount with certain weapon upgrades. The side fighters are weak and can be destroyed in a few hits.

Bonus Items

There are six bonus items the player can get which will give them differing numbers of points:

- Bamboo Shoots: In order to make them appear the players must fly over the clouds in a certain way. 500 points are awarded for making them appear and 2,200 for collecting them.
- Strawberry: To make appear the player typically has to shoot the higher and smallest battleship just before dropping down. Collecting them will give 10,000 points.
- Barrels: Barrels can be found by shooting hidden locations when closer to the water. Barrels are worth 10,000 points.
- Dragonfly: The hardest item to get. It is said to appear when a battleship becomes visible from aerial battle or when the credit notation is at 9. It is worth 10,000 points if collected.
- Cow: Can be revealed by shooting secret locations and is worth 20,000 points when collected.
- Mobi-chan: When a battleship receives 100% destruction four pieces will come from the bridge and fly towards the player. Each piece will deal massive damage to the player if they hit them but if shot down before hitting the player gets 10,000 points for each one. In addition Mobi-Chan from Hyper Dyne Side Arms may escape when the bridge explodes. If shot down it is worth 100,000 points.

== Ports ==
Capcom released their own port for the NES, but the game has also been ported to the Atari ST, the ZX Spectrum, the Amstrad CPC, the Commodore 64 and the Amiga. In 1998, it was re-released as Capcom Generation 1 for the Sega Saturn and the PlayStation. In 2005, it was re-released for Xbox and PlayStation 2 as part of Capcom Classics Collection, and again in Capcom Classics Collection: Reloaded on the PlayStation Portable. It is also included as the initial game in Capcom Arcade Cabinet, a compilation of games released digitally for PlayStation 3 and Xbox 360 in February 2013, in which the games are sold individually or in packs. The game was also included as a free game on Capcom Arcade Stadium, with other games being sold in packs or individually as before.

=== NES ===
Released exactly one year after the arcade version, the NES version of 1943 introduced the ability to improve the player's plane by permanently upgrading certain aspects of its abilities. These include the plane's offensive and defensive powers, the maximum fuel level, and its special weapons and their durations. This somewhat alters the game balance and a different tactic is required to survive the game. For example, initially few weapons are made available; more can be attained from power-ups by putting statistic points into "special weapons ability".

=== Kai ===
Arcade version of 1943 Kai

Developed and released alongside the Family Computer version, 1943 Kai: Midway Kaisen (1943改 ミッドウェイ海戦) is an arcade game, an "alternate" version of the original 1943, released in 1987 in Japan.

In 1991, this version was converted to the PC Engine as simply 1943 Kai, again exclusively in Japan; this version contains many additional levels and original music.

Although the arcade release was exclusive to Japan, the arcade version itself was included in the 1998 Capcom Generations for the Sega Saturn and the PlayStation and in the 2005 Capcom Classics Collection for PlayStation 2 and Xbox.

== Reception ==
In Japan, Game Machine listed 1943: Midway Kaisen as the most popular arcade game of July 1987. It went on to become Japan's second highest-grossing table arcade game of 1987, and tenth highest-grossing arcade conversion kit of 1988. Game Machine also listed 1943 Kai: Midway Kaisen as the sixteenth most popular arcade game of July 1988.

Yoshiki Okamoto, the producer of the game, stated on his YouTube channel that the game faced protests from the Japanese right wing. According to him, protesters criticized the game's content – where players control American aircraft to attack and destroy Imperial Japanese Navy warships – as an insult to the souls of fallen soldiers enshrined at Yasukuni Shrine. Okamoto acknowledged the criticism resonated deeply, that one could question why Japanese developers would deliberately make a game about defeating the Japanese military, and that he had been too young to consider that perspective at the time. He explained the setting was chosen to make the game more appealing by putting the player on the side of the war's winners, and that the content was fantastical – diverging from historical accuracy with elements like mixed Army/Navy aircraft and the battleship Yamato appearing at the Battle of Midway, where it was not actually present. In the NES version, the names of the warships and battlefields were replaced with fictional ones.
