= Capcom Generations =

Series of video game compilations

- Developer: Capcom
- Publisher: Capcom: EU: Virgin Interactive
- Platforms: PlayStation, Sega Saturn
- Release: Volume 1: JP: August 27, 1998; EU: September 3, 1999 (PS only); Volume 2: JP: September 23, 1998; EU: September 3, 1999 (PS only); Volume 3: JP: October 15, 1998; EU: September 3, 1999 (PS only); Volume 4: JP: November 12, 1998; EU: September 3, 1999 (PS only); Volume 5: NA: October 31, 1998 (PS only); JP: December 3, 1998; EU: May 1999 (PS only); EU: November 10, 2000 (Value Series, PS only)
- Genre: Various
- Mode: Single-player

Reception

Review scores
Publication	Score
Computer and Video Games	4/5
GameSpot	Vol. 2: 7.1/10
Jeuxvideo.com	7/20
PlayStation Official Magazine – Australia	5/10
Superjuegos	93/100
Sega Saturn Magazine	Vol. 1: 66% Vol 2: 92%

Capcom Generations (Note: Japanese: カプコン ジェネレーション, Hepburn: Kapukon Jenerēshon) is a series of five video game compilations developed and published by Capcom for the PlayStation and Sega Saturn. Each volume contains three or four games from a particular series or game genre and were ported directly from their original arcade versions (with the exception of Super Ghouls'n Ghosts, which was originally a Super NES game). Each disc also contains a "collection mode" featuring history, tips, artwork, character profiles, arranged music (which can be enabled on the game themselves as well) and other unlockable contents for each game. The PlayStation versions of the games also featured support for the DualShock controller.

In Japan, the series was released individually with 5 discs. In Europe, Virgin Interactive released Volumes 1–4 in a single bundle (retaining the 4 discs) whereas Volume 5 (which focused on the Street Fighter series) was released separately without any ties to the Capcom Generations series and it is the only volume in the series to be released in North America. The 16 games in the series were later collected in both Capcom Classics Collection and Capcom Classics Collection Reloaded, based on their Capcom Generations versions.

== Capcom Generations 1: Wings of Destiny ==
Capcom Generations: Wings of Destiny (カプコン ジェネレーション －第1集 撃墜王の時代－, Capcom Generation Dai-ichi-shū Gekitsui Ō no Jidai; Capcom Generation Collection 1: The Era of Flying Aces) features the first three games in 194X series of shoot 'em up genre.

- 1942 (1984)
- 1943: The Battle of Midway (1987)
- 1943 Kai: Midway Kaisen (1987)

== Capcom Generations 2: Chronicles of Arthur ==
Capcom Generations: Chronicles of Arthur (カプコン ジェネレーション －第2集 魔界と騎士－, Capcom Generation Dai-ni-shū Makai to Kishi; Capcom Generation Collection 2: The Demon World and the Knight) features the first three titles of the Ghosts'n Goblins series.

- Ghosts 'n Goblins (1985)
- Ghouls 'n Ghosts (1988)
- Super Ghouls 'n Ghosts (1991)

== Capcom Generations 3: The First Generation ==
Capcom Generations: First Generation (カプコン ジェネレーション －第3集 ここに歴史はじまる－, Capcom Generation Dai-san-shū Koko ni Rekishi Hajimaru; Capcom Generation Collection 3: History Begins Here) features four of Capcom's first five titles (with 1942 already featured in the first compilation).

- Vulgus (1984)
- SonSon (1984)
- Pirate Ship Higemaru (1984)
- Savage Bees (1985)

== Capcom Generations 4: Blazing Guns ==
Capcom Generations: Blazing Guns (カプコン ジェネレーション －第4集 弧高の英雄－, Capcom Generation Dai-yon-shū Kokō no Eiyū; Capcom Generation Collection 4: Lone Hero) features three run and gun-style shoot 'em up games. In the German version, this disc was removed completely.

- Commando (1985)
- Gun.Smoke (1985)
- Mercs (1990)

== Capcom Generations 5: Street Fighter Collection 2 ==
Capcom Generations: Street Fighter Collection 2 (カプコン ジェネレーション －第5集 格闘家たち－, Capcom Generation Dai-go-shū Kakutōka-tachi; Capcom Generation Collection 5: The Fighters), although it was not marketed as part of the Capcom Generations outside Japan, instead being a "sequel" to Street Fighter Collection, which packaged Super Street Fighter II, Super Street Fighter II Turbo and Street Fighter Alpha 2 Gold. It contains the first three versions of the original Street Fighter II.

- Street Fighter II: The World Warrior (the original Street Fighter II) (1991)
- Street Fighter II: Champion Edition (Street Fighter II Dash in Japan) (1992)
- Street Fighter II Turbo: Hyper Fighting (Street Fighter II Dash Turbo in Japan) (1992)

Some minor changes were made to gameplay, compared to the arcade versions of the games. A "Collection" mode is also featured where the player can view strategies, character profiles and artwork specific to each game, some which become available after meeting certain requirements.

Each game features an "Arcade", "Versus" and "Training" mode. Upon completing a game's single-player mode, an option is unlocked to give the player a choice between the original CPS soundtracks and an arranged version (previously available in the FM Towns port of Super Street Fighter II and the 3DO version of Super Street Fighter II Turbo). After completing the single-player mode of each game at least once, a "Super Vs. Mode" becomes available at the main menu. The Super Vs. Mode allows two players to compete against each other by selecting between characters from any three versions of Street Fighter II in the compilation (Capcom would employ the same concept for Hyper Street Fighter II). If the player completes a game's single-player mode without using continues, a "CPU Battle" mode is unlocked. CPU Battle allows the player to battle any CPU opponent at the game's highest difficulty. If the player manages to defeat the CPU opponent, the game's staff roll will instantly play. Like with the full single-player mode, the player must defeat the CPU opponent without losing a round in order to view the original credits. If the player loses a round but still manages to win, the text-only credits will play.
