= Sonson =

Sonson may refer to:

- Sonsón, a Colombian municipality
- SonSon, an arcade game by Capcom
- SonSon, a playable character in Marvel vs. Capcom 2: New Age of Heroes
