= Knights of the Round (video game) =

1992 video game

- Arcade flyer
- Developer: Capcom
- Publisher: Capcom
- Composer: Isao Abe
- Platforms: Arcade, Super NES, CPS Changer
- Release: Arcade: NA: November 27, 1991; JP: January 1992; Super NES: NA: April 1994; JP: June 10, 1994; CPS Changer: JP: 1995
- Genres: Beat 'em up, action role-playing
- Modes: Single-player, multiplayer
- Arcade system: CP System

Knights of the Round (Note: Japanese: ナイツオブザラウンド, Hepburn: Naitsu obu za Raundo) is a 1991 beat 'em up game developed and published by Capcom for arcades. Based loosely on the legend of King Arthur and the Knights of the Round Table, the game features an action role-playing-like level advancement system, with fighters automatically being upgraded to new weapons and armor as they advance through the game. The arcade version of the game was included in the compilations Capcom Beat 'Em Up Bundle (2018) and Capcom Arcade 2nd Stadium (2022).

== Plot ==
Arthur, who had been training himself to be a great knight, pulled out the sacred sword Excalibur from the rock. After pulling it out, Arthur realized his destiny was to become the first King of the Britons. Merlin then sends Arthur and his two closest companions, Lancelot and Perceval, to overthrow the evil king Garibaldi and to unite Britain.

== Gameplay ==
Gameplay of Knights of the Round

The gameplay is similar to other Capcom beat 'em ups, such as Final Fight and Capcom's previous hack-and-slash fantasy title The King of Dragons. There are seven stages, each with its own boss and a variety of generic enemies that try to stop the players' progress. The fights rely strongly on the blocking ability, which is triggered by pressing the attack button, then pressing the joystick away as the opponent strikes. If successful, the player gains a few seconds of invincibility with which to counter-attack, but if no one strikes the player's character while holding the block, they will tire and drop their guard, making them vulnerable to attack. Blocking is vital in certain cases, since some bosses will be vulnerable only after their attack has been blocked by the player.

As in most beat 'em ups, a desperation attack is performed by pressing both the attack and jump buttons simultaneously. This kills off most enemies on the screen, but the player loses a little bit of health every time he uses it.

At various points in the game, the players get to ride a horse, where they can attack enemies on horseback. The horses can stomp on enemies by pressing the joystick two times forward. On occasion, bosses and certain enemy characters can ride horses as well.

== Characters ==
There are three playable characters:

- King Arthur, the main hero, is a well-balanced character in speed and power. His weapon is the sword Excalibur. He can perform a special attack, a powerful slashing blow, by pressing attack then holding the joystick toward the enemy's direction. Initially, Arthur wears chain mail and leather armor. Upon gaining levels, Excalibur becomes stronger, and he eventually gets more body armor (later in silver and gold colors). Arthur is also the most devastating character, when mounted on horseback.
- Sir Lancelot is a talented swordsman and has been traveling all over the world to find a worthy king he should serve. Lancelot is the fastest character but lacks in strength. Since the game favors maneuverability, he is very good for beginners. His special attack is the jumping kick, done by pressing attack then holding the joystick up. Sir Lancelot's weapon of choice is a sabre. Sir Lancelot starts out wearing a blue tabard with a yellow cross. In eventual level-ups, Lancelot gains plate armor and a broader sabre.
- Sir Perceval, a son of a blacksmith, is a strong warrior with a gentle heart. Unlike his sword-wielding friends King Arthur and Sir Lancelot, Sir Perceval prefers to use a battle-axe as his primary weapon. He has never been defeated thanks to his well-built body. Perceval is the strongest character but lacks in agility, making him good for intermediate to advanced players. He is the only character who can dash by tapping the joystick forward twice, cancelled into a "Giant Swing" by pressing the attack button while dashing. At first, Sir Perceval has blond hair and light armor with green long pants. In eventual level-ups, Sir Perceval becomes bald with a beard, and gains heavier armor, though most of his chest is bare.

== Ports ==
The game was ported to the Super NES in 1994, in Capcom Classics Collection: Reloaded for the PSP in 2006, as well as Capcom Classics Collection Vol. 2 for PlayStation 2 and Xbox and in 2018, in Capcom Beat 'Em Up Bundle for the PlayStation 4, Nintendo Switch, Xbox One and Microsoft Windows.

== Reception ==
Reception

Review scores
Publication	Score	
Publication	Arcade	SNES
AllGame	3/5	N/A
Computer and Video Games	N/A	70%
Game Informer	N/A	7/10; 6.5/10
Game Players	N/A	86%
Hyper	N/A	30/100
Official Nintendo Magazine	N/A	72/100
Sinclair User	78/100	N/A
Super Play	N/A	51%
Total!	N/A	(UK) 51% (DE) 5+
Zero	4/5	N/A
Dengeki Super Famicom	N/A	6/10, 5/10, 6/10, 7/10
Game Zone	4/5	N/A
Super Action	N/A	57%
Super Gamer	N/A	26/100
VideoGames	N/A	7/10

Award
Publication	Award
Gamest (1992)	(ARC) Annual Hit Game 6th, Player Popularity 6th

In Japan, Game Machine listed Knights of the Round on their March 1, 1992 issue as being the most-popular arcade game for the previous two weeks. The Japanese publication Micom BASIC Magazine ranked the game seventh in popularity in its April 1992 issue. In North America, RePlay listed it in its April 1992 issue as being the sixth most-popular arcade game of the previous month, while it was ranked fifty-first among arcade games in a June 1994 equipment survey by Play Meter.

The game also received generally favorable reviews. Sinclair User's John Cook wrote that players who enjoyed Golden Axe would enjoy the game. AllGame's Anthony Baize called it a "solid" beat 'em up title with "cool" mythological characters.

Gamest gave Knights of the Round two awards at the sixth annual "Gamest Awards", placing 6th in the "Annual Hit Game", and 6th in the "Player Popularity". In 2013, Heavy ranked the game as one of the top twenty five beat 'em up video games of all time.

=== Super NES ===
According to Famitsu, Knights of the Round sold 5,225 copies during its lifetime in Japan. The game received a 20.8/30 score in a readers' poll conducted by Super Famicom Magazine. The Super NES version garnered mixed reception from critics. GamePro's Andromeda praised the quality of the sprites but was critical to its slow and repetitive gameplay. In 2018, Complex included the game on their best Super Nintendo games of all time list.

== See also ==
- Magic Sword (video game)
