= 1942 (video game) =

1984 video game

- North American arcade flyer
- Developer: Capcom (Note: NES version developed by Micronics; Amstrad CPC, Commodore 64, and ZX Spectrum versions developed by Elite Systems; Game Boy Color version developed by Digital Eclipse.)
- Publishers: Capcom: Arcade; WW: Capcom; NA: Romstar/Williams Electronics C64, CPC, ZX Spectrum Elite Systems MSX, PC-88, FM-7, X1 ASCII Corporation
- Director: Yoshiki Okamoto
- Programmer: Tamio Nakazato
- Artist: Yoshiki Okamoto
- Composer: Ayako Mori
- Series: 194X
- Platform: Arcade: NES, Amstrad CPC, Commodore 64, MSX, ZX Spectrum, PC-88, FM-7, Sharp X1, Game Boy Color
- Release: December 1984: Arcade; JP: December 1984; EU: May 1985; NA: June 1985 NES; JP: December 11, 1985; NA: November 1986 C64, CPC, ZX Spectrum; EU: 1986 MSX; JP: 1986 FM-7, PC-88, X1; JP: 1987 Game Boy Color; NA: May 19, 2000; PAL: 2001
- Genre: Scrolling shooter
- Modes: Single-player, multiplayer
- Arcade system: Capcom Z80, PlayChoice-10

1942 is a 1984 vertically scrolling shooter video game developed and published by Capcom for arcades. Designed by Yoshiki Okamoto, it was the first game in the 194X series, and was followed by 1943: The Battle of Midway.

1942 is set in the Pacific Theater of World War II, and is loosely based on the Battle of Midway. Despite the game being created by Japanese developers, the goal is to reach Tokyo and destroy the Japanese air fleet. This was due to being the first Capcom game designed with Western markets in mind. It went on to be a commercial success in arcades, becoming Japan's fifth highest-grossing table arcade game of 1986 and one of top five highest-grossing arcade conversion kits that year in the United States. It was ported to the Nintendo Entertainment System, selling over one million copies worldwide, along with other home systems.

== Gameplay ==
Arcade version screenshot

The player pilots a Lockheed P-38 Lightning known as the "Super Ace". The player must shoot down enemy planes and avoid enemy fire. Sustaining a single hit or colliding with another aircraft causes the loss of one life. During the game, the player may collect various power-ups. One of them allows the plane to be escorted by two other smaller fighters in a Tip Tow formation. Enemies include Kawasaki Ki-61s, Mitsubishi A6M Zeros and Kawasaki Ki-48s. The boss plane is a Nakajima G10N.

The game has "a special roll button that allows players to avoid dangerous situations by temporarily looping out of" the play area. In addition to the standard high score, it also has a separate percentage high score, recording the best ratio of enemy fighters to enemies shot down.

== Development ==
The game was designed by Yoshiki Okamoto. The game's main goal was to be easily accessible for players, leading developers to use a World War II theme. 1942 was also the first Capcom game designed with Western markets in mind. To appeal to the American market, the development team decided to have the player pilot an American P-38 fighter plane. The game is loosely based on the Battle of Midway, which was a turning point in the Pacific War when the Americans began defeating the Japanese.

== Ports ==
The game was ported to the MSX, PC-8801, FM-7, and Sharp X1. A port to the Nintendo Entertainment System developed by Micronics was released in 1985 in Japan and North America in 1986. This version was also released in arcades by Nintendo through their PlayChoice-10 arcade machines.

Elite Systems later released versions for the Amstrad CPC, ZX Spectrum, and Commodore 64. The music of the Commodore 64 version is based on the main verse of Ron Goodwin's 633 Squadron film score, with arrangement by Mark Cooksey.

A Game Boy Color version was also released in North America on May 19, 2000, and in PAL regions in 2001.

== Reception ==
Reception

Aggregate score
Aggregator	Score				
Aggregator	Arcade	C64	GBC	iOS	NES
GameRankings			53%		

Review scores
Publication	Score				
Publication	Arcade	C64	GBC	iOS	NES
AllGame	4/5				2/5
TouchArcade				3.5/5	
Zzap!64		87%			
Commodore User		9/10			
Computer Gamer	Positive				

In Japan, Game Machine listed 1942 as the fourth most popular arcade game of December 1984. It went on to be Japan's seventh highest-grossing table arcade game during the first half of 1986, and the overall fifth highest-grossing table arcade game of 1986. In the United States, it was one of the top five highest-grossing arcade conversion kits of 1986. In the United Kingdom, it was the top-grossing arcade game on the Euromax arcade charts from July through November 1987.

The NES version sold over a million copies worldwide. 1942 was Capcom's breakaway hit, eclipsing in popularity the company's preceding three titles: Vulgus, Sonson, and Pirate Ship Higemaru.

Mike Roberts reviewed the arcade game in the May 1985 issue of British magazine Computer Gamer. While noting the game's scenario was "an odd subject for a Japanese arcade manufacturer" to take up, he said it has "nice" graphics and had an "original" gameplay feature in the form of the percentage high score. Retrospectively, Brett Alan Weiss of AllGame called it "a fondly remembered" shooter and praised the special roll button, "perfectly balanced" gameplay, "colorfully detailed" graphics, and "nifty" power-ups.

== Legacy ==
1942 was re-released in Capcom Generations 1 for the PlayStation and Saturn consoles. It was featured in the Capcom Classics Collection for the PlayStation 2 and Xbox, as well as Capcom Classics Collection: Reloaded for the PlayStation Portable. The arcade version was added to the Wii Virtual Console in Japan on December 21, 2010, and in the PAL and North American regions in January 2011. It was also re-released for Windows Mobile Professional.

A remake, 1942: Joint Strike was released for Xbox Live Arcade and PlayStation Network in 2008. 1942: First Strike was released for iOS in 2010.

=== 194X series ===
1942 was the first Capcom title to spawn a successful series of sequels, with five titles in the 194X line released from 1987 to 2000. Many of Capcom's other vertical shooters featured very similar gameplay, such as Varth: Operation Thunderstorm. The game series has sold a total of 1.4 million units worldwide as of December 2019, and stands as Capcom's 18th best-selling franchise.

- 1942 (1984)
- 1943: The Battle of Midway (1987)
- 1943 Kai (1988)
- 1941: Counter Attack (1990)
- 19XX: The War Against Destiny (1996)
- 1944: The Loop Master (2000)
- 1942: Joint Strike (2008)
- 1942: First Strike (2010)
