= Three Wonders =

1991 video game

- Three Wonders arcade flyer
- Developer: Capcom
- Publishers: Capcom; Xing Entertainment (Console)
- Director: Yoshiki Okamoto
- Designer: Toshihiko Uda
- Programmer: Koma Chan
- Composer: Masaki Izutani
- Platforms: Arcade, PlayStation, Sega Saturn
- Release: Arcade: JP: July 1991; NA: August 1991; Saturn: JP: March 5, 1998; PlayStation: JP: April 2, 1998
- Genres: Platformer, scrolling shooter, puzzle
- Modes: Single-player, multiplayer
- Arcade system: CP System

Three Wonders (Note: Japanese: ワンダー3, Hepburn: Wonder 3) is a 1991 video game compilation developed and published by Capcom for arcades. It includes three related titles: Midnight Wanderers: Quest for the Chariot, (Note: ルースターズ ～チャリオットを探して～, Roosters: Chariot wo Sagashite) a platformer; Chariot: Adventure through the Sky, (Note: チャリオット ～天空への旅～, Chariot: Tenkuu he no Tabi) a scrolling shooter; and Don't Pull, (Note: ドンプル, Donpuru) a puzzle video game. Xing Entertainment released the game on the PlayStation and Sega Saturn under license from Capcom.

== Gameplay ==
=== Midnight Wanderers ===
A platform game that sees the player control a hobbit named Lou and his travelling companion, Siva, to run, climb, and shoot at enemies to fight a villain who is turning their people into wooden statues.

=== Chariot ===
A scrolling shooter game featuring the characters from Midnight Wanderers flying in their chariots to save their home planet and princess.

=== Don't Pull ===
A puzzle game similar to games like the Adventures of Lolo series, Pengo, and Capcom's own puzzle game Pirate Ship Higemaru. It involves the player controlling either a rabbit named Don (Player 1) or a squirrel called Pull (Player 2), pushing blocks to crush monsters. Unlike the other two games, it is neither connected to both and there is no plot or backstory behind the game’s events.

== Development and release ==
Three Wonders was released in the arcades on May 20, 1991. A version for the Capcom Power System Changer was planned and previewed but never released.

In 1998, it was ported to the PlayStation and Sega Saturn and published by Xing Entertainment. Three Wonders was also included in the 2006 Capcom Classics Collection Vol. 2 on the PlayStation 2 and Xbox, Capcom Classics Collection Remixed on the PSP and Capcom Arcade 2nd Stadium.

Characters from Three Wonders would go on to appear in other Capcom games. Lou appears in Marvel vs. Capcom: Clash of Super Heroes (1998) as an assist character. Siva was later adapted into the playable character Shiba Shintaro in Cannon Spike (2000).

== Reception ==
Reception

Review score
Publication	Score
Dengeki PlayStation	80/100, 60/100

In Japan, Game Machine listed Three Wonders on their August 1, 1991 issue as being the fifth most-successful table arcade unit of the month. Retro Gamer regarded Three Wonders as a good alternative to Biomechanical Toy. GameFan reviewed the PlayStation version as inferior to the original arcade game due to bad quality converted graphics.
