= Black Tiger (video game) =

1987 video game

- Arcade flyer
- Developer: Capcom
- Publishers: Capcom; Ports; U.S. Gold
- Producer: Yoshiki Okamoto
- Programmer: Masayuki Akahori
- Composer: Tamayo Kawamoto
- Platforms: Arcade, Amiga, Amstrad CPC, Atari ST, Commodore 64, ZX Spectrum
- Release: Arcade: JP: August 1, 1987; NA: August 1987; Amiga, Atari ST, CPC, ZX Spectrum: EU: 1989; C64: EU: 1990
- Genre: Platform
- Modes: Single-player, multiplayer

Black Tiger, known in Japan as Black Dragon (Note: Japanese: ブラックドラゴン, Hepburn: Burakku Doragon), is a 1987 platform game developed and published by Capcom for arcades.

== Plot ==
The land is under the cruel control of three evil demonic dragons, who descended on a kingdom to bring darkness and destruction. From the ruins emerged a barbarian hero, who seeks to slay the dragons and restore the kingdom to its former glory.

== Gameplay ==
Gameplay screenshot

The game is presented in a side-scrolling format, with eight-way scrolling (like Bionic Commando). The player controls the barbarian hero to navigate through eight levels infested with enemies and destroying the levels bosses. The player can find a number of "wise men" who give rewards when rescued. Though the wise man rewards often consist of self-evident "advice", most come in the form of "Zenny coins", currency that allows the player to buy various items, such as an upgrade to their weapons and armor, keys for treasure chests, and anti-poisoning potions. Hidden special items that reveal coins, grant upgraded armor, full vitality, extra lives, extra time, or simply bonus points may be found by attacking certain walls. The player's vitality bar will also increase up to four times as a reward for reaching score benchmarks. The player can also find hidden dungeons in the level for extra points and items.

The Japanese version has a few changes that makes it more challenging than its American counterpart:

- Several of the "falling rock" obstacles are added.
- The prices of many items are higher.
- More points are needed to increase maximum vitality.
- It is not possible to avoid taking damage from bosses by crouching under them.

== Development ==
Black Tiger was planned for released around October 1986, but programming placement difficulties delayed it. During conversion, the game was one of ten games included in a $2,000,000 deal between U.S. Gold and some Japanese coin-op specialists.

== Ports ==
- U.S. Gold released versions of Black Tiger for Amstrad CPC, Amiga, Atari ST, and ZX Spectrum in 1989. A version for the Commodore 64 was released in 1990, developed by Softworx.
- An emulation of the arcade game is included in the compilations Capcom Classics Collection: Remixed for PlayStation Portable and Capcom Classics Collection Vol. 2 for PlayStation 2 and Xbox. It was also included as the initial free game in Capcom Arcade Cabinet for PlayStation Network and Xbox Live Arcade on February 19, 2013 and Capcom Arcade 2nd Stadium.
- The arcade version of Black Tiger was released on the Wii's Virtual Console in Japan on December 7, 2010, the PAL region on January 21, 2011, and in North America on January 24.
- SonSon II for the PC Engine was a game heavily based on Black Tiger, but targeted at a younger audience.
- Black Tiger is one of 32 available games in Capcom Arcade 2nd Stadium that was released in July 2022.

== Reception ==
Reception

Aggregate score
Aggregator	Score			
Aggregator	Arcade	Atari ST	Wii	ZX
Metacritic			68%	

Review scores
Publication	Score			
Publication	Arcade	Atari ST	Wii	ZX
Crash	Positive			
Computer and Video Games		86%		
IGN			7.5/10	
Nintendo Life			6/10	
The Games Machine (UK)		84%		80%
Your Sinclair	Positive			
Commodore User	7/10			

In Japan, Game Machine listed the game as the sixth most successful table arcade unit of October 1987.

Black Tiger received a number of positive reviews. Computer and Video Games put the Atari ST, Amiga and Commodore 64 ports as among the top 20 games of the respective computers of 1990.
