= Mercs =

1990 video game

- U.S. arcade flyer, illustrated by Frank Cirocco
- Developers: Capcom (arcade); Sega (consoles)
- Publishers: Capcom (arcade); Sega (consoles); U.S. Gold (computers)
- Composer: Manami Matsumae
- Platform: Arcade: Arcade, Amiga, Mega Drive/Genesis, Master System, Amstrad CPC, Commodore 64
- Release: February 1990: Arcade; JP: February 1990; EU: March 2, 1990; NA: March 1990 Mega Drive/Genesis; JP: September 27, 1991; NA: October 1991; EU: December 1991 Master System; EU: January 1992
- Genre: Run and gun
- Modes: Single-player, multiplayer
- Arcade system: CP System

Mercs, released as Senjō no Ōkami II (Note: Japanese: 戦場の狼II, Hepburn: Senjō no Ōkami II; lit. "Wolf of the Battlefield II") in Japan, is a 1990 run and gun video game developed and published by Capcom for arcades. It is a sequel to the 1985 arcade video game Commando (Senjō no Ōkami in Japan). While not as successful as its predecessor, Mercs was well received by critics and was a moderate commercial success. It was followed by Wolf of the Battlefield: Commando 3 in 2008, a downloadable game.

== Gameplay ==
Screenshot

The arcade version of the game had up to three players available for play. The players are members of a covert mercenary team known as the "Wolf Force". The team is composed of Joseph Gibson (Player 1 in blue), Howard Powell (Player 2 in red), and Thomas Clarke (Player 3 in yellow). Their objective is to rescue a former President from rebels in the fictional African country of Zutula, which is administered by an apartheid government. The game has six levels, plus the final level where the objective is to rescue the president from the Hercules Transport.

The controls consist of an eight-directional joystick and two buttons: a Normal Attack and the Megacrush Attack. The player character has a vitality gauge which will gradually deplete as they take damage from enemies; however, First-Aid Kits can be picked up that will restore part of the player's energy, as well as power-ups that increases their maximum vitality. The player can upgrade their default gun into an Assault Rifle, a Shotgun, a Grenade Launcher, or a Flamethrower. The Megacrush button will detonate a bomb that kills all on-screen enemies. However, the Megacrush Attack has limited uses which the player can only replenish by picking more Megacrush bombs. In certain stages, the player can pilot enemy vehicles.

== Ports ==
A Mega Drive version of Mercs was produced by Sega, which was first released in Japan on September 27, 1991, with subsequent releases in North America and Europe. The Mega Drive version features two different game modes: an "Arcade Mode", which features the same plot and stages as the arcade version, as well as an "Original Mode" that introduces a new plot with all new stages. One notable aspect which distinguish the Original Mode from the Arcade Mode is the addition of Weapon Shops through the game in which the player can buy power-ups for their character using currency obtained from defeated enemy soldiers, as well as the option to switch between multiple playable characters, each characterized by the weapon they wield (with the starting character using the standard Assault Rifle). Unlike the arcade version, the Mega Drive version of Mercs only allows for a single player, a point which MegaTech magazine considered the game's only weakness.

Home computer ports of Mercs were also released for the Amiga, Amstrad CPC, Atari ST, Commodore 64 and ZX Spectrum in 1991 by U.S. Gold. These conversions of the game were handled by Tiertex, who also developed the Master System conversion.

== Reception ==
Reception

Review scores
Publication	Score
Computer and Video Games	90% (Arcade)
Game Informer	9/10, 9.5/10, 8/10 (Mega Drive)
Sinclair User	74% (Arcade)
Your Sinclair	85% (Arcade)
MegaTech	90% (Mega Drive)
Mega	72% (Mega Drive)

Awards
Publication	Award
RePlay	ACME hit of the show
MegaTech	Hyper Game
Computer and Video Games	C+VG Hit

Upon its North American debut at Chicago's American Coin Machine Exposition (ACME) in March 1990, Mercs was declared "the hit of the show" by RePlay magazine and several major distributors. Upon release, the game was a hit in the United States, where weekly coin drop earnings averaged $193.25 per arcade unit during November and December 1990.

In Japan, Game Machine listed Mercs on their May 1, 1990 issue as being the second most-successful table arcade unit of the month, outperforming titles such as Aliens and Final Fight. In the United States, it had a strong launch, as the top-grossing new arcade release in the May 1990 issue of the RePlay charts. While successful, it was not an arcade blockbuster like the original Commando or its imitators such as Ikari Warriors (1986). The original Commando designer Tokuro Fujiwara was disappointed that he did not develop a Commando sequel sooner, as the arcade market already had numerous Commando style games by the time Mercs released.

Mercs was generally well received by critics upon release. The arcade game received generally positive reviews from Computer and Video Games, Sinclair User and Your Sinclair magazines in 1990.

=== Mega Drive ===
In the United Kingdom, Mercs was the top-selling Sega Mega Drive game in October 1991. The Mega Drive port received generally positive reviews from MegaTech and Mega magazines.

== Legacy ==
The original arcade version of Mercs, along with Commando and Gun.Smoke, are included in the fourth volume of the Capcom Generations compilations released for the PlayStation and Sega Saturn in 1998. The same version of the game would later be included as part of Capcom Classics Collection Vol. 1, released for the PlayStation 2 and Xbox in 2005, and Capcom Classics Collection: Reloaded for the PlayStation Portable in 2006. The Mega Drive/Genesis version was released for the Wii Virtual Console by Sega in North America on February 9, 2009, and by Capcom in Europe on February 20, 2009, at a cost of 800 Wii Points. This re-release is listed under the title of Mercs: Wolf of the Battlefield, to tie in with the earlier Wolf of the Battlefield: Commando 3. The Mega Drive/Genesis version is on the Retrobit Generations Plug and Play, along with other games. The Mega Drive/Genesis version was re-released on the Nintendo Classics service on November 27, 2024.
