= Forgotten Worlds =

1988 video game

- Arcade flyer
- Developer: Capcom
- Publishers: Capcom; Sega (Genesis, Master System); U.S. Gold (home computers); NEC Avenue (TG-16)
- Designers: Akira Yasuda; Akira Nishitani; Noritaka Funamizu; Yoshiki Okamoto
- Artist: Akira Yasuda
- Composer: Tamayo Kawamoto
- Platforms: Arcade, Sega Genesis, Amiga, Commodore 64, Atari ST, ZX Spectrum, Amstrad CPC, Master System, TurboGrafx-16
- Release: May 13, 1988: Arcade; JP: May 13, 1988; NA: May 1988; WW: July 1988 DOS; EU: August 1989 Genesis; JP: November 18, 1989; NA: December 1989; PAL: 1990 ZX Spectrum; EU: 1989 Amiga; EU: 1989 Amstrad CPC; EU: 1989 Atari ST; EU: 1989 C64; EU: 1989 Master System; EU: July 1991 Turbo-CD; JP: March 27, 1992; US: November 1992
- Genre: Scrolling shooter
- Modes: Single-player, multiplayer
- Arcade system: CP System

Forgotten Worlds (Note: Japanese: フォゴットンワールズ, Hepburn: Fogotton Wāruzu), originally titled Lost Worlds (Note: Japanese: ロストワールド, Hepburn: Rosuto Wārudo), is a 1988 horizontally scrolling shooter video game developed and published by Capcom for arcades. It is notable for being the first title released by Capcom for their CP System arcade game hardware.

== Plot ==
Set in the 29th century, an evil god known as Bios has destroyed most of the Earth, turning it into a desolate wasteland known as the Dust World. Two nameless supersoldiers are created by the people to defeat Bios and the eight evil gods who serve him.

== Gameplay ==
Arcade version screenshot

Forgotten Worlds can be played by up to two players simultaneously. The player controls a flying muscle-bound soldier armed with a rifle with unlimited ammo. The Player 1 character is equipped with a long-range automatic rifle, while Player 2 has a short-range wide shot. The controls in the original coin-op version consist of an eight-way joystick for moving the character in the air while flying and a unique rotatable button known as the "roll switch". Rotating the switch left or right allows the player to adjust their character's aim in one of sixteen directions, while pressing it causes the player character to shoot his gun. This allows for the player to move their character anywhere while keeping their aim in one direction. Pressing the switch rapidly will cause the character to perform a "megacrush" attack which will destroy all on-screen enemies, but at the expense of a portion of their vitality gauge.

The player character is accompanied by a satellite module orbiting near him that will provide backup firepower every time the player fires their gun. Like the main character, the satellite can also be rotated with the roll switch. Rotating the character while firing will only rotate the aim of the satellite, while rotating the character without firing will not only rotate the satellite's aim, it will also move its relative position around the player.

The player can visit shops throughout the game to upgrade their weaponry.

The player can obtain blue-colored coins known as Zenny from defeating enemies throughout the game. Zenny is used as currency to obtain new power-up items from shops located at certain points in each stage. When the player enters an item shop, they are given a choice of the items available and a limited time to make any purchase they wish. These items consist primarily of new weapons for the satellite module, but also include a health kit to restore lost vitality, armor that allows the player to sustain additional damage, and even tips on how to defeat the boss awaiting at the end of the current stage.

Forgotten Worlds consists of nine stages each with its own boss. The player will lose if their vitality gauge runs out, but will be given a chance to continue.

== Development ==
The game took two years to develop, with a production budget between $5,000,000 (equivalent to $14,000,000 in 2025) and £5.5 million or $10,000,000 (equivalent to $27,000,000 in 2025). The game used four megabytes of sprite data. The game started off as a regular side-scrolling shooter, but Yoshiki Okamoto wanted a more imaginative game. During development, Capcom tried to make the game easier to play, having received criticism about how hard it was to dodge enemy projectiles in previous games. As this was the first game to use the CPS-1, Capcom tried to fully maximize its software capabilities. The game did not generate enough income upon its release due to large numbers of shooter games in the market and there were increased expenses due to a shortage of chips needed for the CPS-1 boards.

== Home versions ==
Forgotten Worlds was first ported to various home computers in Europe by U.S. Gold in 1989. Versions were produced for the Amiga, Atari ST, Commodore 64, ZX Spectrum, Amstrad CPC, and IBM-compatible PC. These versions of the game were developed by Arc Developments. The development team had four months to make the conversions. Every graphical frame was digitised directly from the arcade version's screen using a DigiView Gold device and stored the data on an Amiga 500 computer. The God of War was hand sketched, redrawn on the computer and colored with Deluxe Paint, although the mirroring function saved time. Even the shop scene was hand sketched from scratch.

All the home computer version required a joystick controller in order to be played and could not be played with the keyboard only (with the exception of the IBM PC, ZX Spectrum, and Amstrad CPC versions). The player rotated the character in these versions by holding the fire button while pushing the joystick left or right. In the Spectrum sales charts, it was number two, behind Robocop, which was number one every month for most of the year.

The Sega Mega Drive/Genesis version, produced by Sega, was released in Japan on November 18, 1989, followed by North America a month later, with a subsequent release in the PAL region the following year. The Mega Drive version simulated the controls of the arcade version by using A and C buttons to rotate the character in either direction and the B button for shooting. Unlike in the arcade version, both players are equipped with long-ranged automatic rifles. This version has only seven of the arcade's nine stages and provides an auto-fire feature that can be toggled on or off on the game's settings. In 2008, the Mega Drive version was released on the Wii Virtual Console in North America on November 17 and in Europe on November 28.

The Master System version was also released by Sega in Europe and Brazil. This version is 1-player only and due to the presence of only two buttons on the Master System's standard controller, the buttons are used solely to rotate the character, who shoots automatically. The megacrush attack is performed in this version by pressing both buttons simultaneously.

The PC Engine version (published by NEC Avenue) was released in Japan on March 27, 1992 as a Super CD-ROM² title which supported a specialized 3-button controller that NEC released only in Japan. The North American version for the TurboGrafx-16 CD was released by Turbo Technologies Inc. With the 3-button controller, the player can control their character as they would in the Mega Drive version, with two buttons to rotate the character and one to shoot. With the standard TurboGrafx-16 controller, the Run button is used in the place of the third button to rotate the character to the left. The TG16 CD port is one-player only, but allows the player to select between either of the two unknown soldiers at the start of the game (with their respective abilities from the arcade version retained).

A version for the Capcom Power System Changer was planned and previewed but never released.

An emulation of the original arcade version is included in the 2005 compilation Capcom Classics Collection Vol.1 for the PlayStation 2 and Xbox, 2006's Capcom Classics Collection: Remixed for the PlayStation Portable, and also for the Nintendo Switch as part of Capcom Arcade Stadium, as well as the PlayStation 4, Xbox One, and Microsoft Windows via Steam. The PS2 and Xbox versions allow the player to use their respective controllers' right analog sticks to control the player character's aim. In 2008 the Mega Drive version was ported to the Wii as part of the Virtual Console.

== Reception ==
Contemporary reception

Review scores
Publication	Score							
Publication	Amiga	Arcade	Atari ST	C64	Master System	PC	Sega Genesis	ZX
ACE	895			885				
Crash								90%
Computer and Video Games	92%	Positive	87%	90%		88% (CPC)		87%
Joypad					78%			
Sinclair User								85%
The Games Machine (UK)	94%	Positive	92%	91%		90% (CPC)		88%
Your Sinclair		Positive						86%
Zzap!64	97%			93%				
Commodore User	90%	8/10		88%				
Mean Machines					62%		85%	
MegaTech							82%	
The One	3/5		3/5			3/5		

Awards
Publication	Award
Gamest Awards	Best Graphics
Crash	Smash
Sinclair User	SU Classic
Computer and Video Games	C+VG Hit
Zzap!64	Gold Medal
Commodore User	Screen Star

In Japan, Game Machine listed Forgotten Worlds on their September 1, 1988 issue as being the second most-successful table arcade unit of the month, outperforming titles like Sky Soldiers and Ninja Spirit. In the United Kingdom, U.S. Gold predicted the home computer port could outsell their previous best-selling Capcom release Bionic Commando, which had sold 70,000 copies in the UK as of early 1989.

The game was met with highly positive reviews from critics. Upon release, the arcade game received positive reviews from Computer and Video Games, The Games Machine, Your Sinclair, and Commodore User. Critics compared the arcade game favorably to earlier shooters including Capcom's Side Arms (1986), Konami's Nemesis (Gradius) and Sega's Space Harrier.

The Games Machine gave the Amiga version a score of 94%, praising the title's graphics and faithfulness to the arcade version.

=== Accolades ===
At the 1988 Gamest Awards in Japan, the arcade game received the "Best Graphics" award.

The home computer conversions received the "CVG Hit!" award from Computer + Video Games. The ZX Spectrum version received the "Crash Smash!" from Crash and the "SU Classic" award from Sinclair User.

=== Retrospective ===
Retrospective reception

Aggregate score
Aggregator	Score	
Aggregator	Sega Genesis	Wii
GameRankings	64%	

Review score
Publication	Score	
Publication	Sega Genesis	Wii
Nintendo Life		7/10
