= Block Block =

1991 video game

- Arcade flyer
- Developer: Capcom
- Publisher: Capcom
- Designers: Futoshi Kuwahara; Toshihiko Uda
- Composers: Yoko Shimomura; Masaki Izutani
- Platform: Arcade
- Release: October 1991
- Genre: Breakout
- Modes: Single-player, multiplayer

Block Block is a 1991 Breakout-style arcade video game developed and published by Capcom. Its style of play is consistent with the traditional play of the brick buster type of games. It is included in Capcom Puzzle World, Capcom Classics Collection and Capcom Arcade 2nd Stadium.

== Gameplay ==
Block Block is made up of two modes; one mode which plays through all 50 levels, and a beginner mode which only carries a selection of levels suitable for the novice. In the normal mode, the player is allowed to choose their starting level. Unlike some brick busting clones, this one introduces a twist on gameplay. Players must use their playing skills to keep the size of the paddle in a playable state. If the paddle counter reaches zero, the paddle shrinks.

== Reception ==
Ryan Davis of GameSpot noted that the game is "playable if derivative", but the replacement of the paddle with conventional controls made the PlayStation Portable version a dismal experience.
