= Legendary Wings =

1986 video game

- Arcade flyer
- Developer: Capcom
- Publisher: Capcom
- Director: Takashi Nishiyama
- Designers: Hiroyuki Kawano; Hiroshi Matsumoto; Akira Kitamura
- Composers: Arcade; Tamayo Kawamoto; NES; Tamayo Kawamoto; Manami Matsumae
- Platforms: Arcade, Nintendo Entertainment System
- Release: Arcade; November 1986; NES: NA: July 1988
- Genres: Scrolling shooter, run and gun
- Modes: Single-player, multiplayer

Legendary Wings, released in Japan as Aresu no Tsubasa (Note: Japanese: アレスの翼, Hepburn: Aresu no Tsubasa; lit. "Wings of Ares"), is a 1986 vertically scrolling shooter and run and gun video game developed and published by Capcom for arcades. The player takes control of a young soldier equipped with magical wings who must save the world from a malfunctioning supercomputer. A home version for the Nintendo Entertainment System was released exclusively in North America in 1988. The original coin-op version is included in Capcom Classics Collection for PlayStation 2 and Xbox and in Capcom Classics Collection Remixed for PlayStation Portable.

== Plot ==
Legendary Wings is set in a distant future where an alien supercomputer named "Dark", which has been helping human civilization achieve a new state of enlightenment since ancient times, has suddenly rebelled against mankind. Two young warriors are given the Wings of Love and Courage by the God of War, Ares, in order to destroy Dark and ensure mankind's survival.

== Gameplay ==
The coin-op version of Legendary Wings can be played by up to two players simultaneously, with a second player being allowed to join the game at any time or even continue after a game over. The game's controls consist of an eight-way joystick and two buttons which changes depending on the context. The game consists of five areas with two different playing styles: the first segment in each stage is a top-view vertical scrolling segment in which the player flies across the sky, shooting at airborne enemies with their gun while dropping bombs at ground enemies, in order to reach the palace at the end of segment. When the player defeats the guardian and gains entrance to the palace, the game switches to a side-scrolling perspective, in which the player moves towards their goal on foot (by walking, crouching, and climbing ladders, as well jumping) until reaching the boss at the end, in which the player character will begin to fly with their wings again. In addition to the regular levels there are two optional levels that are accessible from the vertical-scrolling segment: a "Danger" area, which the player must escape from if inhaled by a giant mechanical face around the midpoint of each level; and a "Lucky" area, which is hidden on each level and contains treasure chests that will increase the player's score.

The player can improve their gun by destroying certain enemies or weapon capsules and picking up the "P" item stored inside. The player can power-up their character up to five levels; the first power-up will increase the player's speed; the second will change their gun to a twin shooter, as well as further increase their speed; the third power-up allows for continuous ground attacks; the fourth power-up improves the player's gun so that it shoots in three directions; and the fifth and final power-up will upgrade weapon to the "Psycho Flame" gun, which can destroy most enemies with a single shot. When the player is shot by an enemy, they will lose a life and revert to their initial power level.

== Versions ==
=== Arcade ===
The original Legendary Wings for the arcade was released in three different variations: a Japanese version (titled Ares no Tsubasa) and two overseas versions. The Japanese release features two different player characters whose names are shown on the game's attract sequence: Michelle Heart, a young woman in a pink bikini-like outfit, and Kevin Walker, a young man in blue briefs. One of the two overseas versions replaces both characters with nameless male heroes, one in red trunks and the other in blue, who both wear golden wings instead of the regular white ones from the Japanese version. The second overseas version recovers the original characters, but it changes the color of Michelle's costume from pink to green.

=== Nintendo Entertainment System ===
The NES version of Legendary Wings features several significant differences from its coin-op counterpart. While the basic premise and formula remain essentially the same, several changes were made to the gameplay, particularly in how the player's power-ups work in this version. Like in the arcade game, the player can upgrade their firepower-up by picking up "P" icons hidden inside certain containers. The player can improve their character's firepower to four levels: starting with the normal gun, the player can improve it to a twin laser, a penetration beam, and a three-way flame shot. Picking up the fourth power-up will turn the player character into a Turtle Dove, which can shoot wide shots that are four times as powerful as the default gun. Leveling up will not only improve the player's gun in the NES version, but will also give the player's bomb better speed and range. If the player is shot during a power-up state, it will simply revert the player to their previous power level. If the player is in Turtle Dove mode, they can withstand up to two direct hits from enemies before getting the downgrade. The player is able to retrieve heart icons hidden within the game's bonus levels to gain continues (up to nine continues can be stocked).

Other changes made for the NES version include longer vertical levels, flying capability during horizontal levels, altered level designs, different bosses for the Danger areas and horizontal levels, an additional dragon boss at the end of each vertical level, an additional final boss at the end of the game, and a different musical score for the Lucky areas.

== Reception ==
In Japan, Game Machine listed Legendary Wings on their December 15, 1986 issue as being the twelfth most-successful table arcade unit of the month.

In 2000, Rob Strangman of Hardcore Gaming 101 gave the NES port of Legendary Wings an 8 out of 10. Calling it "worthy of a place in any shooter fan's library", he considered the game to be unique for its genre and praised the game's music.

In 2013, Kurt Kalata of Hardcore Gaming 101 wrote that Legendary Wings was one of the earlier games to combine both vertical and horizontal shmups into a single game. He complimented the game's visual design, describing the stone faces as "awesome and creepy", but overall considered the arcade version of the game to be "remarkably average", criticizing its difficulty and repetition. He also felt that the horizontal levels were "enclosed" and featured "stiff" movement.

Kalata considered the NES port of the game superior to the arcade version, calling it "one of the better shoot-em-ups for the console". He felt that the level designs were more varied than in the original, described the game as "less punishing" than it is on the arcade, and called the boss faced at the end of each horizontal level "one of the most awesome and disturbing sights on any NES game". He also appreciated the ability to fly during horizontal stages.

IGN ranked Legendary Wings as the 70th greatest game for the NES, calling it the weirdest result of Capcom's efforts to diversify shooters in the 1980s.

== Legacy ==
Michelle Heart makes an appearance in the fighting game Marvel vs. Capcom: Clash of Super Heroes as one of several support characters who assist the main fighters in combat. She also appears as a trading card in SNK's Card Fighters series. In the tactical role-playing game Namco x Capcom, the character of Sylphie (the shopkeeper from Forgotten Worlds) dresses up as Michelle Heart when she performs one of her special attacks. Michelle Heart is also featured in Project X Zone 2 as a cameo character in Captain Commando's Solo Unit attack.

== Records ==
After being uncontested for 33 years, Sam Griffith beat Quentin Balduc's world record for the game on January 20, 2020, in approximately 1 hour and 7 minutes with a score of 694,000pts handily surpassing Balduc's long standing record of 612,500. It was a documented win at Galloping Ghost Arcade.
