= Avengers (1986 video game) =

1986 video game

- Arcade flyer
- Developer: Capcom
- Publisher: Capcom
- Director: Takashi Nishiyama
- Platform: Arcade
- Release: JP: December 1986; NA: February 1987
- Genre: Beat 'em up
- Modes: Single-player, multiplayer

Avengers, known in Japan as Hissatsu Buraiken (必殺 無頼拳; lit. "Deadly Ruffian Fist") and also titled as Avenger to avoid confusion of Marvel's Avengers, is a 1986 beat 'em up video game developed and published by Capcom for arcades. The game was directed by Takashi Nishiyama, who previously designed the side-scrolling beat 'em ups Kung-Fu Master (1984) and Trojan (1986), and later designed the original Street Fighter (1987) and several early SNK fighting games.

== Gameplay ==
Screenshot of Avengers

The game takes place in Paradise City, where the villain, "Geshita", has captured 6 girls from the city. The player's objective (as Ryu or Ko) is to banish "Geshita" from Paradise City once and for all. During the game, the player can pick up powerups like the "Speed Up", the Super Punch, Grenades, Shurikens, Nunchaku and extra health. The game also features hidden areas on each level, accessed by breaking doors in structures on either side of the screen. The player's character has 3 normal means of attack: Punches, which are quick with short range, Kicks, which are slower with longer range, and the Roundhouse, which hits in a 360 degree motion.

== Ports and related releases ==
Avengers was later included in Capcom Classics Collection: Remixed for the PSP and Capcom Classics Collection Vol. 2 for the PlayStation 2 and Xbox. It was one of the initial games available for download in Capcom Arcade Cabinet, a compilation digitally released for PlayStation 3 and Xbox 360 in February 2013.

== See also ==
- List of beat 'em ups
