= Last Duel (video game) =

1988 video game

- Arcade flyer
- Developer: Capcom
- Publisher: Capcom: EU: U.S. Gold (ports)
- Designer: Takashi Nishiyama
- Composer: Tamayo Kawamoto
- Platforms: Arcade, Amiga, Amstrad CPC, Atari ST, Commodore 64, ZX Spectrum
- Release: 1988
- Genre: Scrolling shooter
- Modes: Single-player, multiplayer

Last Duel: Inter Planet War 2012 is a 1988 vertically scrolling shooter video game developed and published by Capcom for arcades. It was ported to the Amiga, Amstrad CPC, Atari ST, Commodore 64, and ZX Spectrum.

== Plot ==
Taking place in the year 2012 of an alternate galaxy, Last Duel involves the struggle between two planets Mu and Bacula. On planet Bacula, a strong warrior tribe known as the Galden rose to immense military power and literally conquered all of the societies on the planet. Unsatisfied with conquering just one planet, the Galden decided to conquer a neighboring terrestrial planet, Mu. Using advanced bioships, star fighters and motor vehicles, the Galden invaded Mu, destroying many of its cities and taking the planet's ruler Queen Sheeta hostage.

The remaining royal guards of Mu are deployed in space fighters that can transform into cars to rescue the queen and crush the Galden forces.

== Gameplay ==
The player alternates per level between using car and space ship. The vehicle has two main attacks one of which varies depending on the form the vehicle takes. In car mode, the vehicle can jump over pot holes and enemies, while in ship mode the vehicle will perform a barrel roll making it temporarily invincible and altogether dangerous.

The player can select power-ups that include a large, slow firing laser, a twin-shot, a wide shot and options that provided side attacks; speed-ups are only available in ship mode. Every driving section is timed and if the player is unable to reach the boss on time, they will lose a life, but the moment the player encounters the boss, the timer will disappear.

== Reception ==
The Spanish magazine Microhobby gave the following scores: Originality: 20%; Graphics: 70%; Motion: 70%; Sound: 60%; Difficulty: 80%; Addiction: 50%.

== Legacy ==
Last Duel was re-released in the Capcom Classics Collection - Volume 2 for the PlayStation 2, Xbox, and PlayStation Portable.
