= Quiz & Dragons: Capcom Quiz Game =

1992 video game

- Japanese flyer for Quiz & Dragons
- Developer: Capcom
- Publisher: Capcom
- Designer: Hideaki Itsuno
- Artist: Haruki Suetsugu
- Composer: Isao Abe
- Platform: Arcade
- Release: NA: 1992; JP: 1994
- Genre: Party
- Modes: Single-player, multiplayer
- Arcade system: CP System

Quiz & Dragons: Capcom Quiz Game (Note: Japanese: クイズ アンド ドラゴンズ, Hepburn: Kuizu ando Doragonzu) is a 1992 party video game developed and published by Capcom for arcades. The game combines some stylistic elements of role-playing video games such as a fantasy theme and multiple characters with that of board games to create a unique twist to the quiz game genre. Unlike most Capcom games, it was released in Japan years after its North American release; it was the first game Hideaki Itsuno worked on at Capcom, which he would stay until 2024 and contributed to the Devil May Cry series.

== Plot ==
The far off land of Capconia has lived in peace and prosperity for years thanks in part to the Knowledge Tree, a tree in which the holder of the tree's seeds is granted infinite knowledge of the world around them. However, an evil being known as Gordian has taken the Wisdom Seed off the tree and has planted a Knowledge Tree of his own. Gordian has given some of the seeds to some of the dragons in the land, meaning any unfortunate soul who cannot answer any of the dragons' questions correctly will be eaten by them. The King then decides to send out four brave warriors entrusted with the knowledge of the land out to stop Gordian and end his tyranny once and for all.

== Gameplay ==
The game plays similar to a board game, where the player is given a predetermined dice roll that moves the player up to six spaces on the board, but if the player is so given the choice, they can move to a space of their choosing if there is a fork in the road. After landing on a space, the player is given a series of questions in order to proceed back to the board for another dice roll. The player is given a time limit to answer the question, with points given that vary based on how fast they answered the question correctly. If the player is successful in answering a question, one of the gems above the enemy's picture will light up, indicating a correct answer. If the player answers a question incorrectly, they will lose a life point. If the player loses all life points, they must continue within the time limit or else the game is over.

There are also two special spaces on the game board that the player may land on. If a player lands on an inn space, an innkeeper will ask them one question. If the player answers the question correctly, the innkeeper will increase their health by anywhere between one and four points. The other space is an elf space. If the player answers the elf's question correctly, they are granted a special skill which will be used in the next round of play. The possible awards are:

- Medicine - one health point is restored.
- Sword - the next quiz has only two possible answers for each question instead of four.
- Staff - the next quiz has only three possible answers for each question instead of four.
- Scroll - the players may select the category of questions for the next quiz.
- Ring of Speed - the timer will be slower for each question in the next quiz.
- Ring of Knowledge - the correct answer will flash for each question in the next quiz.
- Shortcut - the players will be transported to the final square in the current level.

In addition, some squares feature hidden treasure chests that can award any of the above, but also, occasionally, a 5000-point bonus, or all five health points restored.

Certain spaces on the game board that are bigger than other spaces on the game board contain one of Gordian's dragon followers. The players cannot skip this battle and must answer the questions in order to move on in the game.

== Characters ==
=== Fighter ===
A 28-year-old swordsman named Kalcor. His special ability is that he recovers health points faster than the other three characters.

=== Wizard ===
A 318-year-old mystic named Roajin. His special ability allows him to sometimes choose the category of the questions to be given.

=== Amazon ===
A 24-year-old female warrior named Lagnel. Her special ability is that sometimes she only has three or two, rather than the usual four answers to choose from when given a set of questions.

=== Ninja ===
A 35-year-old blade master named Shin. His special ability is sometimes to deal out double damage to the opponent, which effectively cuts down the number of questions needed to be answered by one.

== Ports ==
The game was ported to PlayStation Portable as a part of Capcom Classics Collection: Remixed and on the PlayStation 2 and Xbox as a part of Capcom Classics Collection Vol. 2. In addition to the original 1992 version, the Capcom Classics Collection Vol. 2 port features an alternative version that contains questions that pertain to many Capcom games.

== Reception ==
In Japan, Game Machine listed Quiz & Dragons: Capcom Quiz Game on their November 1, 1994 issue as being the seventh most-successful table arcade unit of the month.
