= Takashi Nishiyama =

Japanese video game designer

- 西山隆志
- Born: 1956 (age 69–70); Japan
- Occupations: Video game designer, director, producer
- Employer(s): Irem (1979–1984); Capcom (1984–1988); SNK (1988–2000); Dimps (2000–present)
- Known for: Street Fighter; Fatal Fury series; The King of Fighters series

Takashi Nishiyama (Japanese: 西山隆志), sometimes credited as "Piston" Takashi Nishiyama or T. Nishiyama, is a Japanese video game designer, director and producer who worked for Irem, Capcom and SNK before founding his own company Dimps. He is best known for developing the scrolling shooter title Moon Patrol, the beat 'em up title Kung-Fu Master, and the fighting game titles Street Fighter, Fatal Fury and The King of Fighters. He also helped develop the Neo Geo system.

== Career ==
Nishiyama started his career at Irem. He worked on the game design of the 1982 scrolling shooter Moon Patrol, one of the first games with parallax scrolling. He was also the designer of Kung-Fu Master (1984), called Spartan X in Japan. It is based on two Hong Kong martial arts films: the Jackie Chan and Sammo Hung film Wheels on Meals (1984), called Spartan X in Japan, and especially the Bruce Lee film Game of Death (1972). Kung-Fu Master is considered the first beat 'em up game, becoming the prototype for most subsequent martial arts games in the late 1980s. The NES port, Kung Fu, was programmed by a Nintendo team under the direction of Shigeru Miyamoto, later influencing his work on Super Mario Bros. (1985) and Zelda II: The Adventure of Link (1987).

During the development of Kung-Fu Master, Nishiyama was invited to join Capcom by its founder Kenzo Tsujimoto, after he had left Irem. He eventually decided to leave Irem and join Capcom before the game was complete. Following its release, Nishiyama was hired by Capcom. He designed an arcade successor for Capcom, Trojan (1986), which evolved the basic gameplay concepts of Kung-Fu Master. The NES port included a one-on-one fighting mode, for the first time in a Capcom game. He then came up with the concept for a game centered entirely around the boss fights in Kung-Fu Master. This led to his creation of the Street Fighter fighting game franchise. Along with Hiroshi Matsumoto, he directed the original Street Fighter (1987). He created the Hadouken special attack for the player characters, which he says was inspired by the Wave Motion Gun, an energy missile attack from the 1970s anime series Space Battleship Yamato. He then left Capcom and did not return to work on the sequel Street Fighter II: The World Warrior.

Nishiyama then joined SNK, after they had invited him to join the company. His first project there was the Neo Geo system, which he helped develop; he proposed the initial concept of an arcade system that uses ROM cartridges like a game console, and also proposed a home console version of the system. His reasons for these proposals was to make the system cheaper for markets such as China, Hong Kong, Taiwan, Southeast Asia, Central America, and South America, where it was difficult to sell dedicated arcade games due to piracy. Nishiyama then created the Fatal Fury fighting game franchise, as a spiritual successor to the original Street Fighter. He also worked on the fighting game franchises Art of Fighting and The King of Fighters, as well as the run and gun video game series Metal Slug. He then left SNK and founded the game development company Dimps in 2000.

== Works ==
Year	Game title	Role
1982	Moon Patrol	Game designer
1984	Kung-Fu Master	Game designer
1985	Section Z	Game designer
1986	Trojan	Game designer
1986	Legendary Wings	Director
1986	Avengers	Director
1987	Street Fighter	Director
1987	Mega Man	Producer
1988	Last Duel: Inter Planet War 2012	Director
1988	LED Storm	Game planner
1991	Ghost Pilots	Executive director
1991	Fatal Fury: King of Fighters	Director
1994	The King of Fighters '94	Producer
1995	Fatal Fury 3: Road to the Final Victory	Producer
1995	Savage Reign	Producer
1995	The King of Fighters '95	Producer
1995	Real Bout Fatal Fury	Producer
1996	Metal Slug	Producer
1996	The King of Fighters '96	Producer
1996	Kizuna Encounter: Super Tag Battle	Producer
1997	Real Bout Fatal Fury Special	Producer
1997	Shinsetsu Samurai Spirits Bushidō Retsuden	Executive producer
1997	The King of Fighters '97	Producer
1998	Metal Slug 2	Producer
1998	Real Bout Fatal Fury 2: The Newcomers	Executive producer
1998	The King of Fighters '98	Producer
1999	King of Fighters R-2	Producer
1999	The King of Fighters '99	Producer
1999	Sonic Pocket Adventure	Executive producer
1999	Samurai Shodown: Warriors Rage	Executive producer
2000	Metal Slug 3	Producer
2003	Demolish Fist	Executive producer
2004	Seven Samurai 20XX	Executive producer
2005	The Rumble Fish	Executive producer
2014	Freedom Wars	Executive producer
2015	Dragon Ball Xenoverse	Executive producer
2016	Dragon Ball Xenoverse 2	Executive producer
2018	Soulcalibur VI	Executive producer
