= Yashichi =

Yashichi may refer to:

- Yashichi, a "boost power-up" icon resembling a shuriken in classic Capcom video games
- Yashichi, a minor character in manga and anime Afro Samurai
- Yashichi, a character in manga and anime Mirmo!
- Kazaguruma no Yashichi, a character in Mito Kōmon
