= Tiger Road =

1987 video game

- Developer: Capcom: Capcom Probe Software (home computers) Advance Communication (PC Engine/TG16) Capcom (PS2/Xbox)
- Publishers: Romstar: U.S. Gold; (European home computers); Capcom; Amiga 500, US C64); Victor Musical Industries (PC Engine) NEC (TG16) Capcom (PS2/Xbox)
- Designer: Tokuro Fujiwara
- Composers: Harumi Fujita, Tamayo Kawamoto, Junko Tamiya (Arcade); Osamu Kasai, Masaaki Harada, Shinji Nakayama (TG16)
- Platforms: Arcade, Amiga, Amstrad CPC, Atari ST, Commodore 64, MS-DOS, TurboGrafx-16, ZX Spectrum
- Release: NA: November 5, 1987
- Genres: Hack and slash, platform
- Modes: Single-player, multiplayer

Tiger Road (Note: Japanese: 虎への道, Hepburn: The Way of a Tiger) is a 1987 hack and slash platform video game developed and published by Capcom for arcades.

Home computer versions were released in Europe by U.S. Gold for the Amiga, Amstrad CPC, Atari ST, Commodore 64, MS-DOS, and ZX Spectrum. An alternate version for the Commodore 64 was released in the United States by Capcom who also published an Amiga 500 port of the game in that region.

A remade version for the PC Engine/TurboGrafx 16 was released in 1990 in Japan and North America. The original arcade game is included in Capcom Classics Collection Vol. 2 for the PlayStation 2 and Xbox.

== Plot ==
In Tiger Road, the player is placed in the shoes of Lee Wong, a master of the Tiger Technique of Oh-Lin. Before the start of the game, Lee's comrades were attacked (with casualties) and children of Oh-Lin were abducted by minions of the Dragon God Ryuken, a warlord and a master of the Dragon Aura Technique who seeks to conquer China. The abducted children are held at the temple of Ryugado (which is also Ryuken's residence) to be brainwashed into becoming Ryuken's soldiers. To win the game, the player must advance past five stages and retrieve scrolls through training areas (bonus stages) to acquire health and weapon power upgrades, and also the Double-Headed Tiger Fighting Technique known as the Tora Kikoh to defeat Ryuken and rescue the children held hostage at the Ryugadoh.

== Regional differences ==
The Japanese arcade release has additional sound hardware, allowing the game to play digital voice samples using an additional Z80 and MSM5205 digital sound chip. In addition, Japanese version must be played twice to see the ending.

The world and USA releases had additional sound hardware removed, and these releases do not play any voice samples, lowering the production cost of the PCB. International release only has to complete the game once to see the ending.

== Reception ==
Reception

Review score
Publication	Score
Electronic Gaming Monthly	7/10, 4/10, 7/10, 4/10 (TG-16)

In Japan, Game Machine listed Tiger Road on their January 1, 1988 issue as being the eighth most-successful table arcade unit of the month. The game was reviewed in 1990 in Dragon #156 by Hartley, Patricia, and Kirk Lesser in "The Role of Computers" column. The reviewers gave the game 4 out of 5 stars.
