= Varth: Operation Thunderstorm =

1992 video game

- Developer: Capcom
- Publishers: JP: Capcom; NA: Romstar
- Composer: Masaki Izutani
- Platform: Arcade
- Release: June 12, 1992
- Genre: Scrolling shooter
- Modes: Single-player, multiplayer
- Arcade system: CP System

Varth: Operation Thunderstorm is a 1992 vertically scrolling shooter video game developed and published by Capcom for arcades. The game was not released on consoles like other Capcom arcade games for unknown reasons, but it was re-released as part of Capcom Classics Collection and Capcom Arcade Stadium.

== Plot ==
This game follows the story of a disaster that befalls a human colony on a planet of the same name. The entire colony is run by a 7th generation supercomputer which controls the operations of all machinery on the planet, but for the residents of Varth, Delta-7 has been possessed by the entity "DUO" (Dimension Unbody Offender), thought of as an evil spirit but actually a temporal-spatial consciousness which spontaneously arose within the supercomputer. DUO has come to the conclusion that human existence is inimical to the planet, and has therefore turned the planet's defenses against its own populace. Eighty percent of the planet is laid waste by the event, and this is only the beginning of DUO's cleansing scheme. The colonists' reliance on the supercomputer has caused them to lose the ability to take care of themselves, and thus have no means of fighting back. The only hope for the colony lies in the pilots of two planes equipped with 4th generation computers which DUO cannot control—they are controlled not by machinery, but by humans.

== Gameplay ==
Gameplay screenshot

Varth's gameplay draws very heavily from 1942 and other games in Capcom's 194X series. The goal is to destroy enemy units while avoiding being hit, and reach the end of the level, occasionally ending with a boss fight. There are 30 levels in the game. One hit from an enemy will cause the player to lose a plane. The biggest difference between Varth and most other games in the genre of its time is the inclusion of items called "Pods". When a player picks up a pod item, a pair of pods will follow the player and carry weaponry of their own to supplement their artillery. Additionally, pods can completely block most (but not all) forms of attacks from enemies, rendering the player almost invulnerable to attack from any direction in which the pods are situated. Players can choose from two formations for their pods - fixed or smart. In fixed mode, both pods remain directly in front of the player to render the planes invulnerable from the front, but leave them open on the sides and from behind. In the smart position the pods will remain separate from each other at a 180-degree angle, and move about according to the direction of incoming fire. If enemy fire manages to slip between the pods before they can react (potentially common in later levels as large numbers of enemies appear on screen), the player is left vulnerable and only has the option of moving in hopes of avoiding a hit.

Varth features three different weapons for the player - a laser (long rate of sustained fire but lowest horizontal range), a Machine gun (relatively powerful with a potential range as wide as the player's craft), and multi-directional shot (wide range but lowest sustained rate of fire). Additionally, three different types of pod weapons are available - homing missiles (weakest weapon but with a useful homing advantage), missiles (more damaging than homing missiles but can only fire forward), and napalm (powerful but with low range). Like 194X games, Varth also features bombs which allow the planes to perform "mega crashes". The type of mega crash a plane can do is determined by the weapon it is carrying. Lasers will result in an electricity attack that will cover the entire screen. The Machine gun will fire missiles which will move from target to target. The multi-directional shot will fire a single large burst that moves directly forward from the player, then emanates many smaller bolts on reaching the top of the screen.

The game also features several items which can help the player in other ways, such as point-yielding icons, items which will increase the power of the player's arsenal, additionally bombs, and items that will destroy all enemies on a screen. Perhaps the most useful item is the Yashichi, which will instantly upgrade a player's weaponry to its highest level.

== Reception ==
Reception

Review scores
Publication	Score
Game Zone	(Arcade) 3.5/5
Sinclair User	(Arcade) 56/100

In Japan, Game Machine listed Varth: Operation Thunderstorm on their September 1, 1992 issue as being the seventeenth most-successful table arcade unit at the time. RePlay also reported the game to be the third most-popular arcade game at the time. Play Meter listed the title to be the forty-ninth most-popular arcade game at the time as well. In the October 1992 issue of Japanese publication Micom BASIC Magazine, it was ranked on the number eight spot in popularity.
