= Eco Fighters =

1994 video game

- Developer: Capcom
- Publisher: Capcom
- Producer: Yoshiki Okamoto
- Designer: Keisuke Mori
- Programmers: Katsuhiko Someya; Kazuhiko Komori; Manabu Kawase
- Artists: Hiroaki Minobe; Makoto Ishii; Masaru Nishimura
- Composer: Shun Nishigaki
- Platform: Arcade
- Release: NA: April 1994; JP: June 1994
- Genre: Scrolling shooter
- Modes: Single-player, multiplayer
- Arcade system: CP System II

Eco Fighters (Note: Known as Ultimate Ecology (Japanese: アルティメット エコロジー, Hepburn: Arutimetto Ekorojī) in Japan.) is a 1994 horizontally scrolling shooter developed and published by Capcom as an arcade video game. As suggested by both its titles, the game has an "eco-friendly" theme.

== Gameplay ==
The game is a horizontal shooter, where the player controls a ship with a rotating weapon. This rotating weapon ensures that the ship does not require complex navigation to destroy enemy objects in inconvenient spots, while still needing to avoid enemy projectiles; this makes the game resemble more of a bullet hell game, than most side-scrolling shooters from Capcom.

== Development and release ==
Eco Fighters was developed by the same team from two Mega Man arcade titles, The Power Battle and The Power Fighters.

Capcom re-released Eco Fighters for the PlayStation 2 and Xbox in 2006 as part of the Capcom Classics Collection Vol. 2 and Capcom Classics Collection Reloaded for the PSP. The game was also playable on the GameTap online service.
