= Gun.Smoke =

1985 video game

- Arcade flyer
- Developer: Capcom
- Publishers: JP/EU: Capcom; NA: Romstar
- Director: Yoshiki Okamoto
- Programmer: Takashi Aoki
- Artists: Yoshiki Okamoto; Noritaka Funamizu
- Composer: Ayako Mori
- Platforms: Arcade, Famicom Disk System, NES, Amstrad CPC, MSX, PlayStation 2, PlayStation, ZX Spectrum, Xbox, Sega Saturn, Windows
- Release: October 23, 1985: Arcade; JP: October 23, 1985; NA: October 1985 FDS/NES; NA: February 1988
- Genre: Run and gun
- Modes: Single-player, multiplayer

Gun.Smoke is a 1985 vertically scrolling shooter video game developed and published by Capcom for arcades. Unique from other scrolling shooters games, Gun.Smoke features a human as the shooter instead of a spacecraft, in this case a character named Billie Bob, a bounty hunter going after the criminals of the Wild West. It was designed by Yoshiki Okamoto.

== Gameplay ==
Gun.Smoke is a run and gun video game in which the screen automatically scrolls upward. Players use three buttons to shoot left, right, and center. The player can also change the way Billie Bob shoots through button combinations. The player dies by getting shot, struck by enemies, or caught between an obstacle and the bottom of the screen. The player can collect various items, including a horse for extra protection, boots for increased movement speed, bullets for faster shots, a yashichi for an extra life, and a rifle for longer shot range. Other items such as stars, bottles, bags, and dragonflies award a score bonus.

Two versions of Gun.Smoke were released in North America by Romstar.

== Ports ==
Gun.Smoke was ported to these systems:

- The MSX
- The PlayStation and Sega Saturn as a part of Capcom Generation 4
- The PlayStation 2, PlayStation Portable and Xbox as a part of Capcom Classics Collection
- The PlayStation 3 and Xbox 360 as a part of Capcom Arcade Cabinet
- The Nintendo Switch, PlayStation 4, Xbox One, and Microsoft Windows as part of Capcom Arcade 2nd Stadium, referred to as Gan Sumoku.
- Windows 98 and Windows XP as a part of Capcom Arcade Hits Volume 3
- The Amstrad CPC as Desperado – Gun.Smoke; this platform received a sequel called Desperado 2
- The ZX Spectrum

=== NES version ===
The game was later ported to the Nintendo Entertainment System (NES) and Family Computer Disk System (FDS) in 1988. The game has a new storyline: In 1849, a gang known as the Wingates attacks the town of Hicksville, kills the sheriff, and causes trouble every day until Billie Bob, the main character, comes to town to free it from the gang. The NES version also has different music.

== Soundtrack ==
The soundtrack for the arcade version was composed by Ayako Mori. On August 25, 1986, Alfa Records released a limited-edition soundtrack, featuring all of the music from the arcade version, as well as two unused tracks. Its catalog number was Capcom Game Music – 28XA-94.

== Reception ==
Game Machine listed Gun.Smoke in their January 1986 issue as being the second most-successful table arcade unit of the month in Japan. The US Play Meter charts listed it as one of the top five arcade games the same month. It went on to be Japan's sixth highest-grossing table arcade game during the first half of 1986.

The arcade game received positive reviews. In a January 1986 issue of Play Meter magazine, Frank Seninsky listed Gun.Smoke as the top recommended arcade conversion kit, calling it "a number-one kit with great graphics." Computer and Video Games magazine gave the arcade game a positive review in March 1986, calling it an "excellent" fast-paced shooter, considering it to be better than light gun shooters such as Hogan's Alley and Shoot Out.

== Legacy ==
A sequel, titled Desperado 2, was developed by Topo Soft and released in 1991. The game was released for the Amstrad CPC, MS-DOS, MSX, and ZX Spectrum.

== See also ==
- Commando
