= Capcom Puzzle World =

2007 video game

- Developer: Sensory Sweep Studios
- Publisher: Capcom
- Platform: PlayStation Portable
- Release: NA: February 6, 2007; AU: July 11, 2007; EU: July 13, 2007
- Genre: Puzzle
- Modes: Single-player, multiplayer

Capcom Puzzle World is a 2007 video game compilation developed by Sensory Sweep Studios and published by Capcom for the PlayStation Portable. It contains five puzzle games:

- Super Puzzle Fighter II Turbo (1996)
- Buster Bros. (1989)
- Super Buster Bros. (1990)
- Block Block (1991)
- Buster Buddies (1995)
