= The King of Dragons =

1991 video game

- Arcade flyer
- Developer: Capcom
- Publisher: Capcom
- Director: Tomoshi Sadamoto
- Producer: Yoshiki Okamoto
- Composer: Yoko Shimomura
- Platforms: Arcade, Super NES
- Release: Arcade: JP: July 1991; NA: September 1991; Super NES: JP: March 4, 1994; NA: April 1994
- Genres: Beat 'em up, action role-playing
- Modes: Single-player, multiplayer
- Arcade system: CP System

The King of Dragons (Note: Japanese: ザ・キングオブドラゴンズ, Hepburn: Za Kingu obu Doragonzu) is a 1991 beat 'em up game developed and published by Capcom for arcades. It follows players as they control characters through the kingdom of Malus to defeat monsters led by the dragon Gildiss. It features a level advancement system, allowing character attributes to be upgraded as players progress through the game. The game's music was composed by Yoko Shimomura.

The King of Dragons was ported to the Super NES in 1994. An emulated version of the game has been released in multiple Capcom compilations.

== Gameplay ==
A wizard fighting the Orc King boss in the first level of the game.

The game has 16 levels, though many are short. The King of Dragons features a role-playing video game-like level advancement system. Points scored for killing monsters and picking up gold count towards experience, and the character gains levels at regular intervals. With each level, the character's health bar increases, other attributes such as range improve, and the character also becomes invulnerable for a few seconds. Along the way, different weapon and armor upgrades for each character may also be picked up.

The King of Dragons features a simple control system that consists of a single attack button, and a jump button. By pressing both buttons, the character unleashes a magical attack that strikes all enemies in screen (its strength varies according to the character used) at the expense of losing energy. The fighter, cleric and dwarf can also use their shield to block certain attacks by tilting the joystick back right before the impact.

This is one of the many Capcom games to feature the yashichi power-up item (a "boost power-up" icon resembling a shuriken). There are three such power-ups hidden throughout the game, each giving the player an extra continue.

The five playable heroes each have their own traits and fighting skills in the game. The Fighter is good with melee attacks and defense but lacks magical ability. The Dwarf is able to dodge and block attacks, is the most agile character that has decent melee attacks albeit the shortest range and little magic ability. The Elf has good agility and great range with archery but is not physically strong. The Cleric has great defense, decent magic (with the ability to heal his comrades) and melee attacks but bad agility. The Wizard has poor defense but good magical attacks and quick melee attacks.

== Ports ==
A port to the Super NES was published in 1994. It reduces the number of simultaneous players down to two and the characters are smaller. It is also possible to assign the magic attack and shield defense to different buttons.

The arcade version is part of Capcom Classics Collection Vol. 2, released for the PlayStation 2 and Xbox in November 2006, and Capcom Classics Collection: Reloaded for the PlayStation Portable. It is also part of two compilations for PlayStation 4, Xbox One, Nintendo Switch, and Windows: Capcom Beat 'Em Up Bundle (2018) and Capcom Arcade 2nd Stadium (2022).

== Reception ==
Reception

Review scores
Publication	Score
Computer and Video Games	(SNES) 77/100
Electronic Gaming Monthly	(SNES) 8/10, 7/10, 7/10, 8/10
Game Informer	(SNES) 5/10
Game Players	(SNES) 57%
Hyper	(SNES) 30/100
Official Nintendo Magazine	(SNES) 64/100
Super Play	(SNES) 53%
Total!	(SNES) 60% (SNES) 3-
Zero	(ARC) 4/5
Electronic Games	(SNES) C+
Game Zone	(ARC) 4/5
Super Gamer	(SNES) 53/100
VideoGames	(SNES) 5/10

Awards
Publication	Award
Gamest (1991)	(ARC) Best Action Award 2nd, Best Production Award 9th, Best Graphic Award 8th, Annual Hit Game 19th
Micom BASIC Magazine (1991)	(ARC) Overall Grand Prize 5th, Player Division 6th, Best Action 3rd, Game Center Department 9th

In Japan, Game Machine listed The King of Dragons on their October 1, 1991 issue as being the most-popular arcade game for the previous two weeks. The Japanese publication Micom BASIC Magazine ranked the game twenty-fifth in popularity in its November 1991 issue. Game Zone's David Wilson thought the fantasy world setting of each level was neat, while Zero's Doris Stokes called it a "a good, nicely addictive" beam 'em up game. In 2023, Time Extension listed it as one of the best beat 'em ups of all time.

Gamest gave The King of Dragons multiple awards at the fifth annual "Gamest Awards", placing 2nd in the "Best Action Award", 9th in the "Best Production Award", 8th in the "Best Graphics Award", and 19th in the "Annual Hit Game". Micom BASIC Magazine also gave the game several awards at the 1991 "Video Game Grand Prize", placing 5th in "Overall Grand Prize", 6th in "Player Division", 3rd in "Best Action", and 9th in "Game Center Department".

=== Super NES ===
According to Famitsu, The King of Dragons sold 8,979 copies in its first week on the market and 11,544 copies during its lifetime in Japan. The game received a 21.6/30 score in a readers' poll conducted by Super Famicom Magazine. The Super NES version garnered mixed reception from critics.
