= Savage Bees =

1985 video game

- Developer: Capcom
- Publishers: Arcade: JP: Capcom; NA: Memetron; Famicom; Tokuma Shoten
- Director: Yoshiki Okamoto
- Programmer: Takashi Aoki
- Artist: Yoshiki Okamoto
- Composer: Tamayo Kawamoto
- Platforms: Arcade, Famicom
- Release: Arcade: JP: February 1985; NA: April 1985; Famicom: JP: December 21, 1985
- Genre: Scrolling shooter
- Modes: Single-player, multiplayer

Savage Bees, released as Super Floating Fortress Exed Exes (Note: Japanese: 超浮遊要塞エグゼドエグゼス, Hepburn: Chō Fuyū Yōsai Eguzedo Eguzesu) in Japan, is a 1985 vertically scrolling shooter video game developed and published by Capcom for arcades. It was released on the Family Computer by Tokuma Shoten the same year as simply Exed Exes.

== Gameplay ==
Arcade version

Exed Exes is a vertically scrolling shooter game.

== Release ==
Savage Bees was licensed to Memetron originally for its North American release. It was ported to the Famicom by Micronics.

== Reception ==
Reception

Review scores
Publication	Score
Nintendo Life	(VC) 4/10
Famimaga	(FC) 15.27/30

In Japan, Game Machine listed Savage Bees as the 15th most popular arcade game of March 1985. Fan reception for the Famicom version was mixed: readers of Famimaga voted to give Exed Exes a 15.27 out of 30 score. A reviewer of Gamest Mook noted that the insect and skull-themed enemies, the inorganic backgrounds, as well as the mysterious and anxiety-inducing music posed a unique and exciting atmosphere. He also praised the mechanic of turning enemies into collectable fruit items as "the greatest attraction" for this title.

== Legacy ==
Savage Bees was included with its original name on the Capcom Generations 3 for the Sega Saturn and PlayStation, Capcom Classics Collection for the PlayStation 2 and Xbox and Capcom Classics Collection Reloaded for the PlayStation Portable. This game was released for the Wii Virtual Console Arcade in Japan on September 21, 2010, and in the PAL region and North America in January 2011. In 2013, it was released on Capcom Arcade Cabinet for the PlayStation 3 and Xbox 360 as Savage Bees. It is also available in Capcom Arcade 2nd Stadium for the Nintendo Switch, PlayStation 4, Xbox One and Microsoft Windows, and as one of the rotating arcade games in Street Fighter 6's Game Center.

Colonel Issue appears as a cameo character in Project X Zone 2 as part of Captain Commando's Solo Unit attack.
