= Hyper Dyne Side Arms =

1986 video game

- European arcade flyer
- Developer: Capcom
- Publishers: Arcade: JP/EU: Capcom; NA: Romstar; Ports: EU: GO! Media Holdings
- Designers: Yoshiki Okamoto; Noritaka Funamizu
- Programmer: Takashi Aoki
- Artist: Akira Yasuda
- Composer: Ayako Mori
- Platforms: Arcade, PC Engine, PC Engine CD-ROM², Amstrad CPC, Atari ST, Amiga, Commodore 64, MS-DOS, ZX Spectrum
- Release: Arcade: NA: November 1986; JP: December 1986; EU: Late 1986; PC Engine: JP: July 14, 1989; NA: 1989; PC Engine CD-ROM: JP: December 15, 1989
- Genre: Scrolling shooter
- Modes: Single-player, multiplayer

Hyper Dyne Side Arms (Note: Japanese: サイドアーム, Hepburn: Saido Āmu) is a horizontally scrolling shooter arcade video game developed and published by Capcom in 1986. The player controls a flying mecha fighter battling an alien army. Side Arms uses a two-directional attacking system similar to Capcom's previous shoot-'em-up Section Z.

== Plot ==
An evil alien empire known as the Bozon are launching a full-scale attack on Earth. As either Lt. Henry or Sgt. Sanders, the player must pilot a giant space mecha known as a "Mobilsuit" to defeat the aliens. Up to two players can play simultaneously.

== Gameplay ==
The controls consist of an eight-way joystick for moving the Mobilsuit and three action buttons. Side Arms uses two shooting buttons, one for shooting to the left and the other to the right. The third button is used to change between the weapons acquired by the player. There are five types of power-ups that can be acquired by the player: a speed upgrade, an orbital bit that will provide additional firepower with the standard gun, a shotgun that shoots in a fan-shaped range, a three-way shooter, and a mega bazooka launcher that fires a laser beam. The player can choose what power-up their mecha will receive by shooting the power-up icon until getting the item they want. All of the weapons, as well as the mecha's speed, can be upgraded up to two or even three levels depending on the item. There is also a speed downgrade that will reduce the Mobilsuit's speed by one level. There are also two "Auto" power-ups, shaped like the enemy characters from Vulgus: one is shaped like the "Yashichi" and allows the player to fire continuously with either firing button held down; while the other, which is shaped like the "Sakichi", allows the player to shoot upwards, downwards and forwards at the same time, but at a slower rate than the regular shot.

In addition to the standard power-ups, there are two special combination power-ups shaped like the Greek letters α and β that will combine the player's Mobilsuit with an ally. This allows the player to do an eight-directional attack at the same time as their regular attack. When two players are playing this power-up will combine both players' suits instead. One player will move the combined suit and perform the regular attack, while the other will provide the eight-directional attack. If the combined suit gets shot, it will revert both suits into their regular separate states.

== Ports ==
Atari ST screenshot

Side Arms was released for the PC Engine on July 14, 1989 in Japan by NEC Avenue. According to Takashi Tateishi, the composer for the PC Engine version, the port was actually developed by Capcom themselves, but published by NEC Avenue to avoid offending Nintendo. This version differs from the arcade game in that it allowed player to change weapons through a sub-menu while pausing the game, but the PC Engine version lacks the 2-player feature from the arcade game. This port was published in North America during the same year by Radiance Software.

There was also an improved port to the PC Engine CD-ROM², under the name Hyper Dyne Side Arms Special (サイドアーム・スペシャル). This version features a new "Before Christ" mode with various changes to gameplay.

Home computer versions of Side Arms were also released in Europe for the ZX Spectrum, Amstrad CPC, Amiga, Commodore 64, and Atari ST, which were published by Go! and developed by Probe Software.

The original coin-op version of Side Arms is included in Capcom Classics Collection: Remixed for the PlayStation Portable in 2006 and Capcom Classics Collection: Vol. 2 for the PlayStation 2 and Xbox between 2006 and 2007.

In July 2022, Side Arms was also included in Capcom Arcade 2nd Stadium for the Nintendo Switch, PlayStation 4, Xbox One and Microsoft Windows via Steam.

== Reception ==
In Japan, Game Machine listed Hyper Dyne Side Arms on their February 1, 1987 issue as being the ninth most-successful table arcade unit of the month.

Computer and Video Games magazine reviewed the PC Engine version in 1989, giving it a 90% score.
