= SonSon =

1984 video game

- Developers: Capcom (arcade); Micronics (Famicom)
- Publisher: Capcom
- Director: Yoshiki Okamoto
- Programmer: Hirokazu Fujinaka
- Artist: Yoshiki Okamoto
- Composers: Ayako Mori; Tamayo Kawamoto
- Platforms: Arcade; Famicom
- Release: Arcade: JP: July 1984; NA: 1984; Famicom: JP: February 8, 1986
- Genre: Shoot 'em up/run and gun
- Modes: Single-player, multiplayer

SonSon (Note: Japanese: ソンソン, Hepburn: SonSon) is a 1984 platform video game developed and published by Capcom for arcades. It is loosely based on the Chinese novel Journey to the West. The player assumes the role of a monkey boy (who is patterned after Sun Wukong from the story) and fights their way from one side to another, eventually reaching the statue of Buddha. One battles bats, rats, and mad bombers along the way with his fighting rod that shoots balls of fire.

The game was ported from the arcade to the Family Computer in Japan. It is considered one of the greatest games of all time. A sequel, titled SonSon II, heavily based on Black Tiger, was released for the PC Engine, published by NEC Avenue. According to composer Manami Matsumae, the PC Engine title was made by Capcom, one of the few games that they developed for the console themselves.

== Gameplay ==
The game is a 2-D sidescrolling platformer. The screen scrolls automatically, only stopping to fight major enemies. The screen features six continuous platforms that occasionally feature small gaps. Sonson and Tonton walk automatically across these platforms. Pressing up or down will cause them to jump up or down to the next platform. Pressing left causes them to move more slowly than the screen scrolls, essentially continuing to move forward but at a reduced pace. Pressing right does the opposite - SonSon and TonTon will move across the platforms faster than the screen scrolls. The duo have only one attack - the ability to fire energy blasts from their staves. Touching an enemy or an unfriendly projectile causes the player to lose a life. If a player has any additional lives, they will return to the screen riding on a cloud that will give them temporary invincibility. If the player presses the control stick in any direction, the cloud will disappear and the character will resume its usual walking mode. The cloud will eventually disappear on its own if the control stick is not used.

Power-ups come in the form of various fruits which produce points (with enough points giving the player an extra life). Gathering certain fruit will cause all enemies currently on a screen to turn into point-bearing fruits. Walking across certain platforms will randomly cause a bamboo shoot to sprout, yielding many extra points.

It is possible to play the game co-operatively with partner who plays as TonTon (who is Zhu Bajie in the original story).

== Ports and related releases ==
The arcade version is included in the compilations Capcom Arcade 2nd Stadium for Windows, Xbox One, PlayStation 4 and Nintendo Switch as the initial free game. It was also released for Capcom Generation 3 for PlayStation and Sega Saturn, Capcom Classics Collection for the PlayStation 2 and Xbox, Capcom Classics Collection Reloaded for the PlayStation Portable and Capcom Coin-Op Classics by Hanaho games included with the HotRod controller for the PC. It was released on the Wii Virtual Console in Japan on September 7, 2010, and in North America and Europe in December.

Capcom's Street Fighter Alpha features a shop called SonSon in Ryu's and Guy's stages. This same shop is also featured in stages from Super Puzzle Fighter II Turbo and Capcom vs. SNK: Millennium Fight 2000. In Marvel vs. Capcom 2: New Age of Heroes there is a character named SonSon, who is the granddaughter of the main character of the same name.

== Reception ==
In Japan, Game Machine listed SonSon on their August 1, 1984 issue as being the fifth most-successful table arcade unit of the month.
