= Commando (video game) =

1985 video game

- Arcade flyer
- Developer: Capcom
- Publishers: JP/EU: Capcom; NA: Data East; UK/IRE: Deith Leisure; DE: Nova Apparate GmbH; SPA: Sega, S.A. SONIC
- Designer: Tokuro Fujiwara
- Composer: Tamayo Kawamoto
- Platform: Arcade: Amstrad CPC, BBC Micro, Commodore 16, Commodore 64, ZX Spectrum, Acorn Electron, NES, FM-7, PC-88, Intellivision, MSX, Apple II, Atari 2600, IBM PC, Atari 7800, Amiga, Atari ST
- Release: May 1985: Arcade; JP/NA: May 1985; EU: July 1985 BBC Micro, CPC, ZX Spectrum; UK: November 1985 C64; UK: November 1985; NA: Mid-1986 NES; JP: September 27, 1986; NA: November 1986 Intellivision; December 1987 2600, Apple II; June 1988 7800; November 1989
- Genre: Run and gun
- Mode: Single-player

Commando, released as Senjō no Ōkami (Note: Japanese: 戦場の狼, Hepburn: Senjō no Ōkami; lit. "Wolf of the Battlefield") in Japan, is a 1985 run and gun video game developed and published by Capcom for arcades. The game was designed by Tokuro Fujiwara. It was distributed in North America by Data East, and in Europe by several companies including Capcom, Deith Leisure and Sega, S.A. SONIC. Versions were released for various home computers and video game consoles. It is unrelated to the 1985 film of the same name, which was released six months after the game.

Commando was a critical and commercial success, becoming one of the highest-grossing arcade video games of 1985 and one of the bestselling home video games of 1986. Though not the first military-themed run and gun video game, it spawned numerous clones following its release while popularizing the genre. Its influence can be seen in many shooter games during the late 1980s to early 1990s.

The game later appeared on Capcom Classics Collection, Activision Anthology, and on the Wii Virtual Console Arcade, as well as Capcom Arcade Cabinet for PlayStation 3 and Xbox 360. A sequel, Mercs, was released in 1989.

== Gameplay ==
In-game screenshot

The player takes control of a soldier named Super Joe, who starts by being dropped off in a jungle by a helicopter, and has to fight his way out singlehandedly, fending off a massive assault of enemy soldiers.

Super Joe is armed with an assault rifle (which has unlimited ammunition) as well as a limited supply of hand grenades. While Joe can fire his gun in any of the eight directions that he faces, his grenades can only be thrown vertically towards the top of the screen, irrespective of the direction Joe is facing. Unlike his assault rifle bullets, grenades can be thrown to clear obstacles, and explosions from well-placed grenades can kill several enemies at once.

At the end of each level, the screen stops, and the player must fight several soldiers streaming from a gate or fortress. They are ordered out by a cowardly officer, who immediately runs away, although shooting him in the back awards the player bonus points. Along the way, one can attempt to free prisoners of war as they are transported across the screen by the enemy.

Some home console ports of the game contain hidden underground shelters that can only be accessed with grenades. Inside these shelters are prisoners for the player to rescue. Some of these ports also include items. Among the items included in the NES version are a more powerful machine gun upgrade, an unlimited grenade upgrade, and "glasses" to let the player view all the hidden bunkers. The player will lose these upgrades after losing a life.

Extra lives are given at 10,000 points, and per 50,000 scored up to 960,000; thereafter, no more lives. Play continues until the last Super Joe is dead, or survives 140 levels (or 35 loops), which ends the game.

The arcade version contains eight unique levels. The NES version contains only four unique level designs, but repeats those levels with minor changes and increasing difficulty to create a total of sixteen levels.

== Development ==
The game was developed by Capcom, where it was designed by Tokuro Fujiwara. He was concurrently leading the development of both Commando and Ghosts 'n Goblins at the same time. Both games sold well for Capcom upon release.

== Ports ==
A home version of Commando developed by Capcom was released for the Nintendo Entertainment System. Activision released a port of the game for the Atari 2600 and INTV released a port for the Intellivision. An Atari 7800 version by Sculptured Software was published in 1989.

Elite released versions for many home computers. They released the Commodore 64, ZX Spectrum, BBC Micro, and Amstrad CPC versions in November 1985. The BBC Micro and Acorn Electron versions were developed under contract by Catalyst Coders, while Elite developed the Amiga, Atari ST, Acorn Electron, ZX Spectrum, Amstrad CPC and Commodore 64 versions.

The Commodore 64 port's theme, a more complex and extended version of the arcade music, was created in less than 12 hours by Rob Hubbard, "[I] started working on it late at night, and worked on it through the night. I took one listen to the original arcade version and started working on the C64 version. [...] By the time everyone arrived at 8:00 in the morning, I had loaded the main tune on every C64 in the building! I got my cheque and was on a train home by 10:00".

The arcade version was re-released on the Virtual Console as Wolf of the Battlefield: Commando in Japan on October 5, 2010, in North America on December 6, 2010, and in the PAL region on December 17, 2010.

=== Unreleased versions ===
A version for Atari 8-bit computers was created by Sculptured Software in 1989, intended to be released by Atari Corporation for the XEGS. However, although the game appeared in Atari catalogs of the time, it never reached the market in spite of being completed. In the 2000s the game's prototype cartridge was found.

== Reception ==
Reception

Review scores
Publication	Score						
Publication	Arcade	Atari 2600	C64	iOS	NES	PC	ZX
Computer Gaming World					Positive		
Computer and Video Games	Positive	77%	37/40			35/40	35/40
TouchArcade				2/5			
Cash Box	Positive						
Computer Gamer	Positive						
New Straits Times			9/10			9/10	9/10
The Video Games Guide	5/5						

Awards
Publication	Award
Computer Gamer	Best Coin-Op Game of the Year
Golden Joystick Awards	Best Arcade-Style Game
Crash	Best Shoot Em Up; Best Wargame (runner-up)

=== Arcade ===
In Japan, Game Machine listed Senjō no Ōkami as the most popular arcade game of May 1985. In the United States, it had topped the American RePlay chart for upright arcade cabinets by November 1985. In the United Kingdom, it became one of the top-grossing arcade games in London West End test locations, leading to orders for thousands of units in the UK alone, where it became a major hit. Commando similarly became a major hit across Europe. It had become the world's top arcade game at the time. Commando sold more than 15,000 arcade PCB units by June 1985.

Commando ended the year as the highest-grossing arcade game of 1985 in the United Kingdom, while also outperforming Track & Field, the UK's highest-grossing arcade game of 1984. In the United States, it was one of the top three highest-grossing arcade video games of 1985, along with fellow Data East releases Karate Champ and Kung-Fu Master.

Mike Roberts of Computer Gamer called it "a very exciting game" and said "the quality of animation and graphics is superb." Computer and Video Games praised the fast-paced gameplay, smooth movement, rousing music jingle, and cartoon-style graphics, while criticizing the lack of color in the graphics. Cash Box magazine said it "is fierce and strategic, the graphics realistic and the fire power explosive" which makes it "an exciting and challenging play experience."

=== Ports ===
The home computer ports of Commando topped the UK software sales charts in December 1985, becoming the seventh best-selling game of 1985 in the UK. It topped the charts again in January 1986, and went on to become one of the top three best-selling games of 1986 in the UK. In the United States, the home computer versions received two Gold Awards from the Software Publishers Association in 1987 for more than 200,000 units sold in the region.

The NES version released in 1986 sold 1.14 million copies worldwide.

New Straits Times reviewed the BBC Micro, Amstrad CPC, Commodore 64 and ZX Spectrum versions in January 1986, calling it a "must-have" war simulation "to end all war simulation games" with "fast and furious" action "bordering on the impossible." Computer Gaming World said in 1988 that "few cartridges can equal [Commando]'s non-stop action" on the NES. TouchArcade reviewed the iOS version in 2017 and gave it a score of 2.5 out of 5 stars.

NintendoLife wrote that "Commando might be one of the few examples of the stripped-down ports actually being stronger than the original game. These later ports added powerups, better music and depth to the gameplay that are all sadly lacking in the arcade original."

=== Accolades ===
Computer Gamer magazine's Game of the Year Awards gave the original arcade version of Commando the award for best coin-op game of the year, beating Paperboy and Marble Madness. After being ported to home computers, Commando was voted best arcade-style game of the year at the 1986 Golden Joystick Awards, and won the award for best shoot 'em up game of the year, according to readers of Crash magazine. In 1996, GamesMaster ranked the game 57th on its list of the "Top 100 Games of All Time."

== Legacy ==
Commando was a highly influential game, popularizing the run-and-gun shooter genre along with military shooter themes. It led to run-and-gun games becoming the dominant style of shoot 'em up during the late 1980s to early 1990s, when Your Sinclair called Commando "the great grand-daddy of the modern shoot 'em up" genre. It has also been credited as the "product that shot" Capcom to "8-bit silicon stardom" in 1985, "closely followed by" Ghosts 'n Goblins.

Commando spawned numerous clones following its release. Home computer clones and imitators released later the same year include Who Dares Wins and Rambo. The most successful Commando imitator was SNK's arcade hit Ikari Warriors (1986), which spawned two sequels. The run-and-gun shooter format of Commando was also adapted into a side-scrolling format by Konami's Green Beret (Rush'n Attack) later the same year.

=== Sequels and successors ===
Commando was followed by a sequel titled Mercs in 1989, which was known as Senjō no Ōkami II in Japan. However, it was not as successful as Commando or Ikari Warriors. Tokuro Fujiwara was disappointed that he did not develop a Commando sequel sooner, as the arcade market already had numerous Commando imitators by the time Mercs released. A second sequel, Wolf of the Battlefield: Commando 3 was released as a downloadable title for the Xbox Live Arcade and the PlayStation Network in 2008.

Outside Japan, the arcade version of Bionic Commando was marketed as a sequel to Commando and the main character, a nameless soldier in the game, is identified as "Super Joe" in an American brochure for the game. Super Joe would appear as an actual supporting character in the later versions of Bionic Commando for the Nintendo Entertainment System and Game Boy, as well as in Bionic Commando: Elite Forces. In the 2009 version of Bionic Commando for the PlayStation 3 and Xbox 360, the character of Super Joe is identified as Joseph Gibson, one of the three player characters in Mercs.

The game Duet by Elite Systems Ltd was also called first "Commando '86" then "Commando '87".

== See also ==
- Front Line
- Gun.Smoke
- Ikari Warriors
