= Trojan (video game) =

1986 video game

- North American arcade flyer
- Developer: Capcom
- Publishers: WW: Capcom; NA: Romstar; NA: Nintendo (PlayChoice-10)
- Director: Takashi Nishiyama
- Designer: Takashi Nishiyama
- Platforms: Arcade, NES, MS-DOS
- Release: Arcade: NA: March 1986; JP: April 1986; EU: June 1986; NES: JP: December 24, 1986; NA: February 1987; EU: March 23, 1989; MS-DOS: January 1988
- Genres: Hack and slash, beat 'em up
- Modes: Single-player, multiplayer
- Arcade system: PlayChoice-10

Trojan, released in Japan as Tatakai no Banka (Note: Japanese: 闘いの挽歌, Hepburn: Tatakai no Banka; lit. "Requiem for Battle"), is a 1986 hack and slash video game developed and published by Capcom for arcades; it was released in North America by Romstar. Directed by Takashi Nishiyama, it is a spiritual successor to the beat 'em up Kung-Fu Master (1984), which was designed by Nishiyama at Irem before he left for Capcom, where he evolved its gameplay concepts with Trojan. It has also been likened to Capcom's Ghosts 'n Goblins (1985), which has similar side-scrolling action gameplay elements.

== Plot ==
The story describes a post-apocalyptic near future that is suffering the aftermath of a nuclear war as brought upon and further exploited by a demonic influence. The spirits of warlords from past ages have come back to life, destroying civilization with violence and disease. These wicked spirits possess the bodies of the era's strongest survivors, the "chosen", and have risen up to rule over the small, peaceful tribes with an iron fist under the direction of their supreme leader known as Achilles.

The main character is a young warrior resistant to the evil spirits' influence who has taken the battle-name Hero Trojan in his quest to defeat the evil dictator whom he once worked under, but rebelled against when he realized that Achilles had been slaughtering innocent people. The player's mission as Hero Trojan is to infiltrate the lands of the evil army, fighting against pirates and gladiators along the way and exorcising their mortal bodies of the demons within them with his trusty sword and shield as he makes his way through the gothic/industrial wasteland.

== Gameplay ==
The arcade version can be played by up to two players. The game's controls consist of an eight-way joystick and two action buttons. Similarly to Kung-Fu Master and Rush'n Attack, the player jumps by holding the joystick upwards instead of having a dedicated jump button like other side-scrolling action games. Instead, one button is used to swing the sword at enemies and the other to hold the shield to block enemy attacks, including projectiles such as throwing-knives and arrows. The shield can be held towards the player while standing or crouching, as well as upwards vertically and diagonally. Some enemies will throw magic balls which cause the player to lose their sword and shield if they block. During these instances, the player will fight barehanded, with the sword and shield buttons used to punch and kick respectively. The sword and shield will appear on-screen after some time, allowing the player to recover them. Power-ups include floating hearts that restore the player's health and jumping spots where the player can jump higher than usual.

The game consists of six stages, where the player will face the usual series of weak enemies, as well as a sub-boss at the middle of each stage and a boss at the end. The player is allowed to start the game at any of the six stages, but the player must play through the entire game again after defeating the final boss, Achilles, in order to see the true ending (similarly to Ghosts 'n Goblins). The player can continue after a game over depending on the dip switch settings.

The NES version of Trojan features several significant changes to the game, such as the addition of new power-ups and hidden rooms, an additional boss battle on the final stage against a pair of characters known collectively as King Shriek, and an alternative versus mode, where two players compete against each other in a first-to-three-rounds match, making it Capcom's first attempt at the fighting game genre. Player 1 controls the main character, while Player 2 controls the enemy character, whose abilities are identical to the main character. While the version in Capcom Classics Collection Vol. 1 is a direct emulation of the original arcade game, it also allows the option to assign one of the action buttons for jumping in addition to using the directional pad or the analog stick.

== Release ==
A Nintendo Entertainment System port was released the same year as the arcade version. It included a one-on-one fighting game mode, for the first time in a Capcom game, making it a precursor to Nishiyama's work on Capcom's Street Fighter (1987). Nintendo released the version in arcades on the PlayChoice-10. A version for MS-DOS was also released during the same year. A ZX Spectrum version was programmed by Clive Townsend for Elite Systems in 1987 for their Durell publishing line of games, but was never released; an incomplete version has since been leaked from a collection of Townsend's ZX Microdrive disk files. The arcade version was later included in Capcom Classics Collection Vol. 1 for PlayStation 2 and Xbox. The NES version was rereleased in 2016 for the Wii U Virtual Console, but only in Japan.

== Reception ==
Reception

Review scores
Publication	Score
AllGame	4/5 (NES)
Computer and Video Games	Positive (arcade)
The Games Machine (UK)	48% (NES)

In Japan, Game Machine listed Trojan as the 16th most successful table arcade unit of May 1986.

Clare Edgeley of Computer and Video Games gave the arcade game a positive review. She praised the graphics and gameplay, and considered it to be a worthy successor to Capcom's side-scrolling arcade hit Ghosts 'n Goblins (1985). Allgame editor Brett Alan Weiss praised the game, commenting "though not as good or as influential as Ghosts & Goblins or the Mega Man series, Capcom's lesser known Trojan is still a fine game with a nice variety of levels to traverse and an interesting mix of enemies to battle".
