= Vulgus =

1984 video game

- North American flyer
- Developer: Capcom
- Publishers: JP: Capcom; WW: SNK
- Designer: Tokuro Fujiwara
- Composer: Ayako Mori
- Platforms: Arcade, IBM PC
- Release: JP: May 1984; NA: July 1984
- Genre: Scrolling shooter
- Modes: Single-player, multiplayer

Vulgus (Note: Japanese: バルガス, Hepburn: Barugasu) is a 1984 vertically scrolling shooter video game developed and published by Capcom for arcades. Future rival SNK released the game outside Japan. The game was Capcom's first arcade video game. The game is included in Capcom Classics Collection and was released as freeware in 2002.

A Nintendo Entertainment System sequel was developed, but never released. A playable ROM has surfaced online.

== Gameplay ==
The player controls a spaceship with a single objective: destroy incoming enemies. The vessel has two different weapons: a primary weapon with infinite ammunition and a limited supply of bombs. By picking up the "Pow" icons, which sporadically appear throughout the levels, the player can replenish supplies. Similar to Xevious, the game does not have distinct levels; the background alternates between the surface of a planet and a space field. The game repeats with increased difficulty until the player loses all of their lives.

== Reception ==
According to Game Machine, Vulgus was among the most popular arcade games in Japan during June 1984.

In Play Meter magazine, Roger C. Sharpe gave it a generally favorable review and rated it three hashes.

== Legacy ==
A follow-up game, Titan Warriors, originally known as Neo Vulgus, was in development for the Nintendo Entertainment System, but was not released. In 2001, Capcom released Vulgus as freeware for IBM PCs and PDAs. Vulgus is available in the compilation title Capcom Generation 3 for the PlayStation and Saturn. The game is included in the 2005 Capcom Classics Collection for the PlayStation 2 and Xbox in Capcom Classics Collection Reloaded for the PlayStation Portable and as a bonus game at Capcom Arcade Cabinet.

The Pow icon is re-used in many other Capcom games, like 1941: Counter Attack, Bionic Commando, and Savage Bees. Likewise, the Yashichi enemy has made later appearances in many Capcom games, usually in a more benign role as a power-up. Valgas, a boss character from the Power Stone series, has his name based on this game.

In Marvel vs. Capcom 3: Fate of Two Worlds, Deadpool reveals that he is petitioning for Capcom to make Vulgus 2.
