= Tamayo Kawamoto =

Japanese composer

Tamayo Kawamoto 河本 圭代
- Also known as: TAMAYO
- Origin: Japan
- Genre: Video game music
- Occupation: Composer

Tamayo Kawamoto (河本 圭代), also simply known as TAMAYO, is a Japanese video game music composer. During her time at Capcom, she wrote music for games. After leaving Capcom in 1988, she joined Taito and became a member of their in-house band, Zuntata. She later joined up with Japanese singer Cyua to form the group Betta Flash.

== Career ==
Kawamoto was one of the first musicians hired at Capcom. At Capcom, she was credited under the alias "Tamayan" or "Tamatama". She produced music for games such as Commando, Black Tiger, Ghouls 'n Ghosts, and Savage Bees. Kawamoto later left Capcom in 1988. In 1989, she joined Taito as a composer, becoming a member of their house band and sound team, Zuntata. While in Zuntata, Kawamoto composed the soundtracks for Yūyu no Quiz de Go! Go! and the Ray series, including RayForce, RayStorm, and RayCrisis.

According to Kawamoto in an interview, shortly after she left Zuntata, a prior coworker that was still working at Zuntata invited her to a party where they introduced her to the singer Cyua. Kawamoto later joined up with Cyua to form the group Betta Flash, with Kawamoto composing their songs and Cyua being the vocalist. Betta Flash's single, Erinyes, is featured as the closing song in the anime Night Wizard!. Betta Flash also arranged new songs for the CD set, "Ray'z Music Chronology," which was released in 2017.

== Music credits ==
- Buster Bros.
- Ghouls 'n Ghosts (Arcade)
