= List of Capcom games: E–L =

This is a list of video games by Capcom organized alphabetically by name. The list may also include ports that were developed and published by others companies under license from Capcom.

Title	System	Release date	Developer(s)	JP	NA	EU	AUS	Ref(s)
E.X. Troopers	Nintendo 3DS	November 22, 2012	Capcom	Yes				
E.X. Troopers	PlayStation 3	November 22, 2012	HexaDrive	Yes				
Eco Fighters	Arcade	December 3, 1993	Capcom	Yes	Yes	Yes	Yes	
El Dorado Gate Volume 1	Dreamcast	October 10, 2000	Capcom	Yes				
El Dorado Gate Volume 2	Dreamcast	December 12, 2000	Capcom	Yes				
El Dorado Gate Volume 3	Dreamcast	February 2, 2001	Capcom	Yes				
El Dorado Gate Volume 4	Dreamcast	April 12, 2001	Capcom	Yes				
El Dorado Gate Volume 5	Dreamcast	June 6, 2001	Capcom	Yes				
El Dorado Gate Volume 6	Dreamcast	August 8, 2001	Capcom	Yes				
El Dorado Gate Volume 7	Dreamcast	October 10, 2001	Capcom	Yes				
Ether Vapor Remaster	Microsoft Windows	September 27, 2012	Edelweiss	Yes	Yes	Yes	Yes	
Everblue	PlayStation 2	August 9, 2001	Arika	Yes		Yes		
Everblue 2	PlayStation 2	August 8, 2002	Arika	Yes	Yes	Yes		
Exed Exes	Arcade	February 1985	Capcom	Yes	Yes	Yes	Yes	
Exoprimal	Microsoft Windows	July 14, 2023	Capcom	Yes	Yes	Yes	Yes	
Exoprimal	PlayStation 4	July 14, 2023	Capcom	Yes	Yes	Yes	Yes	
Exoprimal	PlayStation 5	July 14, 2023	Capcom	Yes	Yes	Yes	Yes	
Exoprimal	Xbox One	July 14, 2023	Capcom	Yes	Yes	Yes	Yes	
Exoprimal	Xbox Series X/S	July 14, 2023	Capcom	Yes	Yes	Yes	Yes	
Eye of the Beholder	Super Nintendo Entertainment System	1994	Westwood Associates	Yes	Yes	Yes	Yes	
F-1 Dream	Arcade	April 1988	Capcom	Yes				
Fairy Bloom Freesia	Microsoft Windows	October 17, 2012	Capcom	Yes	Yes	Yes	Yes	
Famicom Mini: Ghosts 'n Goblins	Game Boy Advance	2004	Capcom	Yes				
Fate/tiger colosseum	PlayStation Portable	September 13, 2007	Cavia/Type-Moon	Yes				
Fate/unlimited codes	Arcade	June 11, 2008	Type-Moon/Cavia/Eighting	Yes				
Fate/unlimited codes	PlayStation 2	December 18, 2008	Type-Moon/Cavia/Eighting	Yes				
Fate/unlimited codes	PlayStation Portable	June 18, 2009	Type-Moon/Cavia/Eighting	Yes	Yes	Yes		
Fever Chance	Arcade	October 1983	Capcom	Yes				
Fighting Street	Virtual Console	October 6, 2009	Alfa System	Yes	Yes	Yes	Yes	
Final Fight	Amiga	December 1989		Yes	Yes	Yes	Yes	
Final Fight	Amstrad CPC	December 1989		Yes	Yes	Yes	Yes	
Final Fight	Arcade	December 1989	Capcom	Yes	Yes	Yes	Yes	
Final Fight	Atari ST	December 1989		Yes	Yes	Yes	Yes	
Final Fight	Commodore 64	December 1989		Yes	Yes	Yes	Yes	
Final Fight	CPS Changer	December 1989	Capcom	Yes	Yes	Yes	Yes	
Final Fight	Game Boy Advance	May 25, 2001	Capcom	Yes	Yes	Yes	Yes	
Final Fight	Super Nintendo Entertainment System	December 21, 1990	Capcom	Yes	Yes	Yes	Yes	
Final Fight	Sega Mega-CD	April 2, 1993	A-Wave	Yes	Yes	Yes	Yes	
Final Fight	X68000	December 1989	Capcom	Yes	Yes	Yes	Yes	
Final Fight	ZX Spectrum	December 1989		Yes	Yes	Yes	Yes	
Final Fight 2	Super Nintendo Entertainment System	May 22, 1993	Capcom	Yes	Yes	Yes	Yes	
Final Fight 2	Virtual Console	October 9, 2009	Capcom	Yes	Yes	Yes	Yes	
Final Fight 3	Super Nintendo Entertainment System	December 21, 1995	Capcom	Yes	Yes	Yes		
Final Fight 3	Virtual Console	December 8, 2009	Capcom	Yes	Yes	Yes	Yes	
Final Fight Guy	Super Nintendo Entertainment System	1992	Capcom	Yes				
Final Fight One	Game Boy Advance	2001	Capcom	Yes	Yes	Yes	Yes	
Final Fight Revenge	Arcade	July 1999	Capcom	Yes	Yes	Yes	Yes	
Final Fight Revenge	Sega Saturn	March 30, 2000	Capcom	Yes				
Final Fight: Double Impact	PlayStation Network	April 15, 2010	Capcom	Yes	Yes	Yes	Yes	
Final Fight: Double Impact	Xbox Live Marketplace	April 15, 2010	Capcom	Yes	Yes	Yes	Yes	
Final Fight: Streetwise	PlayStation 2	February 28, 2006	Capcom		Yes	Yes		
Final Fight: Streetwise	Xbox	February 28, 2006	Secret Level		Yes	Yes		
Finder Love	PlayStation Portable	June 29, 2006	Capcom	Yes				
Flipper Football	Pinball	October 1996	Capcom	Yes	Yes	Yes	Yes	
Flock!	PlayStation Network	April 9, 2009	Proper Games	Yes	Yes	Yes	Yes	
Flock!	Xbox Live Marketplace	April 8, 2009	Proper Games	Yes	Yes	Yes	Yes	
Flock!	Microsoft Windows	April 7, 2009	Proper Games	Yes	Yes	Yes	Yes	
Forgotten Worlds	Amiga	July 1988	Arc Developments	Yes	Yes	Yes	Yes	
Forgotten Worlds	Atari ST	July 1988	Arc Developments	Yes	Yes	Yes	Yes	
Forgotten Worlds	Arcade	July 1988	Capcom	Yes	Yes	Yes	Yes	
Forgotten Worlds	DOS	July 1988	Arc Developments	Yes	Yes	Yes	Yes	
Forgotten Worlds	Master System	July 1988	SIMS Co., Ltd.	Yes	Yes	Yes	Yes	
Forgotten Worlds	Sega Mega Drive/Genesis	July 1988	Sega	Yes	Yes	Yes	Yes	
Forgotten Worlds	TurboGrafx-CD	July 1988	NEC	Yes	Yes	Yes	Yes	
Forgotten Worlds	Virtual Console	July 1988		Yes	Yes	Yes	Yes	
Forgotten Worlds	ZX Spectrum	July 1988	Arc Developments	Yes	Yes	Yes	Yes	
Fox Hunt	PlayStation	1996	3Vision Gamers/Evolutionary Publishing, Inc.	Yes	Yes	Yes	Yes	
Fox Hunt	Microsoft Windows	1996	3Vision Gamers/Evolutionary Publishing, Inc.	Yes	Yes	Yes	Yes	
Fushigi Deka	PlayStation	2000	Capcom	Yes				
G.I. Joe: The Atlantis Factor	Nintendo Entertainment System	March 1992	KID		Yes			
Gaia Master Kessen!: Seikiou Densetsu	Dreamcast	2001	Capcom	Yes				
Gaia Master: Kami no Board Game	PlayStation	April 20, 2000	Capcom	Yes				
Gaist Crusher	Nintendo 3DS	December 5, 2013	Treasure	Yes				
Gakkou no Kowai Uwasa: Hanako-san ga Kita!!	PlayStation	1995	Capcom	Yes				
Gakkou no Kowai Uwasa: Hanako-san ga Kita!!	Sega Saturn	1995	Capcom	Yes				
Gargoyle's Quest	Game Boy	May 2, 1990	Capcom	Yes	Yes	Yes		
Gargoyle's Quest	Virtual Console	June 29, 2011	Capcom	Yes	Yes	Yes	Yes	
Gargoyle's Quest II	Nintendo Entertainment System	July 17, 1992	Capcom	Yes	Yes	Yes		
Gargoyle's Quest II	Game Boy	1993	Capcom	Yes				
Genma Onimusha	Xbox	January 28, 2002	Capcom	Yes	Yes	Yes		
Ghosts 'n Goblins	Amiga		Elite Systems	Yes	Yes	Yes	Yes	
Ghosts 'n Goblins	Atari ST		Elite Systems	Yes	Yes	Yes	Yes	
Ghosts 'n Goblins	Arcade	September 1985	Capcom	Yes	Yes	Yes	Yes	
Ghosts 'n Goblins	Commodore 64		Elite Systems	Yes	Yes	Yes	Yes	
Ghosts 'n Goblins	DOS		Pacific Dataworks International	Yes	Yes	Yes	Yes	
Ghosts 'n Goblins	Nintendo Entertainment System	June 13, 1986	Micronics	Yes	Yes	Yes	Yes	
Ghosts 'n Goblins	Virtual Console		Micronics	Yes	Yes	Yes	Yes	
Ghosts 'n Goblins	ZX Spectrum		Elite Systems	Yes	Yes	Yes	Yes	
Ghosts 'n Goblins: Gold Knights	iOS	November 11, 2009	Capcom	Yes	Yes	Yes	Yes	
Ghosts 'n Goblins: Gold Knights II	iOS	August 12, 2010	Capcom	Yes	Yes	Yes	Yes	
Ghouls 'n Ghosts	Amiga		Software Creations		Yes	Yes		
Ghouls 'n Ghosts	Atari ST		Software Creations	Yes	Yes	Yes	Yes	
Ghouls 'n Ghosts	Arcade	December 1988	Capcom	Yes	Yes	Yes	Yes	
Ghouls 'n Ghosts	Commodore 64		Software Creations	Yes	Yes	Yes	Yes	
Ghouls 'n Ghosts	Master System	March 1990	Sega	Yes	Yes	Yes	Yes	
Ghouls 'n Ghosts	Sega Mega Drive/Genesis	September 1989	Sega	Yes	Yes	Yes		
Ghouls 'n Ghosts	Virtual Console			Yes	Yes	Yes	Yes	
Ghouls 'n Ghosts	X68000		Capcom	Yes	Yes	Yes	Yes	
Ghouls 'n Ghosts	ZX Spectrum		Software Creations	Yes	Yes	Yes	Yes	
Ghost Trick: Phantom Detective	Nintendo DS	June 19, 2010	Capcom	Yes	Yes	Yes	Yes	
Ghost Trick: Phantom Detective	iOS	December 16, 2010	Capcom	Yes	Yes	Yes	Yes	
Ghost Trick: Phantom Detective	Microsoft Windows	June 30, 2023	Capcom	Yes	Yes	Yes	Yes	
Ghost Trick: Phantom Detective	Nintendo Switch	June 30, 2023	Capcom	Yes	Yes	Yes	Yes	
Ghost Trick: Phantom Detective	PlayStation 4	June 30, 2023	Capcom	Yes	Yes	Yes	Yes	
Ghost Trick: Phantom Detective	Xbox One	June 30, 2023	Capcom	Yes	Yes	Yes	Yes	
Giga Wing	Arcade	March 1999	Takumi Corporation	Yes	Yes			
Giga Wing	Dreamcast	November 11, 1999	Takumi Corporation	Yes	Yes	Yes		
Giga Wing 2	Arcade	January 2000	Takumi Corporation	Yes	Yes			
Giga Wing 2	Dreamcast	January 2000	Takumi Corporation	Yes	Yes			
GioGio's Bizarre Adventure	PlayStation 2	July 25, 2002	Capcom	Yes				
Glass Rose	PlayStation 2	November 6, 2003	Cing/Capcom	Yes		Yes		
God Hand	PlayStation 2	September 14, 2006	Clover Studio	Yes	Yes	Yes	Yes	
God Hand	PlayStation Network	October 4, 2011	Clover Studio		Yes			
God of War	PlayStation 2	November 17, 2005	Santa Monica Studio	Yes				
God of War II	PlayStation 2	October 25, 2007	Santa Monica Studio	Yes				
God of War Collection	PlayStation 3	March 18, 2010	Santa Monica Studio	Yes				
Gold Medal Challenge	Nintendo Entertainment System	June 5, 1992	Capcom	Yes	Yes	Yes		
Goof Troop	Super Nintendo Entertainment System	July 11, 1993	Capcom	Yes	Yes	Yes		
Gotcha Force	GameCube	November 27, 2003	Capcom	Yes	Yes	Yes	Yes	
Gregory Horror Show	PlayStation 2	August 7, 2003	Capcom	Yes		Yes		
Group S Challenge	Xbox	August 28, 2003	Capcom	Yes	Yes	Yes		
Gun.Smoke	Arcade	November 1985	Capcom	Yes	Yes	Yes	Yes	
Gun.Smoke	Commodore 64			Yes	Yes	Yes		
Gun.Smoke	Nintendo Entertainment System	January 27, 1988	Capcom	Yes	Yes	Yes		
Gun.Smoke	Family Computer Disk System	January 27, 1988	Capcom	Yes	Yes	Yes		
Gun.Smoke	ZX Spectrum		Topo Soft	Yes	Yes	Yes		
Gyakuten Kenji 2	Nintendo DS	February 3, 2011	Capcom	Yes				
Harvey Birdman: Attorney at Law	Wii	January 8, 2008	High Voltage Software		Yes			
Hat Trick	Commodore 64	1984	Sente Technologies	Yes	Yes	Yes	Yes	
Haunting Ground	PlayStation 2	April 21, 2005	Capcom	Yes	Yes	Yes	Yes	
Heavy Metal: Geomatrix	Arcade	2001	Capcom	Yes	Yes	Yes		
Heavy Metal: Geomatrix	Dreamcast	July 12, 2001	Capcom	Yes	Yes	Yes		
Higemaru Makaijima - Nanatsu no Shima Daibōken	Nintendo Entertainment System	April 14, 1987	Capcom	Yes				
Higemaru Makaijima - Nanatsu no Shima Daibōken	MSX2	1987	Capcom	Yes				
Hyper Street Fighter II: The Anniversary Edition	PlayStation 2	December 2003	Capcom	Yes	Yes	Yes	Yes	
Hyper Street Fighter II: The Anniversary Edition	Xbox	December 2003	Capcom	Yes	Yes	Yes	Yes	
Hyper Street Fighter II: The Anniversary Edition	Arcade	December 2003	Capcom	Yes	Yes	Yes	Yes	
Ide no Yosuke no Jissen Mahjong	Nintendo Entertainment System	September 24, 1987	Capcom	Yes				
Ide no Yosuke no Jissen Mahjong II	Nintendo Entertainment System	February 22, 1991	Capcom	Yes				
Ide Yousuke Meijin no Shinmi Jissen Mahjong	Sega Saturn	1996	Capcom	Yes				
Ide Yousuke Meijin no Shinmi Jissen Mahjong	PlayStation	1996	Capcom	Yes				
JoJo's Venture	Arcade	December 1998	Capcom	Yes	Yes			
JoJo's Venture	PlayStation	October 14, 1999	Capcom	Yes	Yes	Yes		
JoJo's Venture	Dreamcast	November 25, 1999	Capcom	Yes	Yes	Yes		
JoJo's Bizarre Adventure HD	PlayStation Network	August 21, 2012	Capcom	Yes	Yes	Yes	Yes	
JoJo's Bizarre Adventure HD	Xbox Live Marketplace	August 22, 2012	Capcom	Yes	Yes	Yes	Yes	
JoJo's Bizarre Adventure: Heritage for the Future	Arcade	1999	Capcom	Yes				
Kabu Trader Shun	Nintendo DS	June 7, 2007	Capcom	Yes				
KenKen: Train Your Brain	iOS	Jun 10, 2009	Capcom	Yes	Yes	Yes	Yes	
killer7	GameCube	June 9, 2005	Grasshopper Manufacture	Yes	Yes	Yes	Yes	
killer7	PlayStation 2	June 9, 2005	Grasshopper Manufacture	Yes	Yes	Yes	Yes	
Kingpin	Pinball	1996	Capcom	Yes	Yes	Yes	Yes	
Knights of the Round	Arcade	November 27, 1991	Capcom	Yes	Yes			
Knights of the Round	CPS Changer	1995	Capcom	Yes				
Knights of the Round	Super Nintendo Entertainment System	April 1994	Capcom	Yes	Yes			
Kunitsu-Gami: Path of the Goddess	Microsoft Windows	July 19, 2024	Capcom	Yes	Yes	Yes	Yes	
Kunitsu-Gami: Path of the Goddess	PlayStation 5	July 19, 2024	Capcom	Yes	Yes	Yes	Yes	
Kunitsu-Gami: Path of the Goddess	Xbox Series X/S	July 19, 2024	Capcom	Yes	Yes	Yes	Yes	
Kunitsu-Gami: Path of the Goddess	Nintendo Switch 2	June 5, 2025	Capcom	Coming	Coming	Coming	Coming	
Kyojin no Hoshi	PlayStation 2	June 20, 2002	Capcom	Yes				
Last Duel: Inter Planet War 2012	Amiga			Yes	Yes	Yes	Yes	
Last Duel: Inter Planet War 2012	Atari ST			Yes	Yes	Yes	Yes	
Last Duel: Inter Planet War 2012	Arcade	July 1988	Capcom	Yes	Yes	Yes	Yes	
Last Duel: Inter Planet War 2012	Commodore 64			Yes	Yes	Yes	Yes	
Last Duel: Inter Planet War 2012	ZX Spectrum			Yes	Yes	Yes	Yes	
Last Ranker	PlayStation Portable	July 15, 2010	imageepoch/Capcom	Yes				
Layton-kyoju VS Gyakuten Saiban	Nintendo 3DS	November 29, 2012	Level 5	Yes	Yes	Yes	Yes	
LED Storm	Amiga	1989		Yes	Yes	Yes	Yes	
LED Storm	Atari ST	1989		Yes	Yes	Yes	Yes	
LED Storm	Arcade	1989	Capcom	Yes	Yes	Yes	Yes	
LED Storm	Commodore 64	1989		Yes	Yes	Yes	Yes	
LED Storm	ZX Spectrum	1989		Yes	Yes	Yes	Yes	
Legend of Kay	PlayStation 2	March 4, 2005	Neon Studios/Kaiko		Yes	Yes	Yes	
Legendary Wings	Arcade	November 1986	Capcom	Yes	Yes	Yes	Yes	
Legendary Wings	Nintendo Entertainment System	July 1988	Capcom		Yes			
Lil' Pirates	iOS	November 4, 2010	Capcom/IUGO		Yes	Yes	Yes	
Little League	Arcade	July 1983	Capcom	Yes				
Little Nemo: The Dream Master	Nintendo Entertainment System	September 1990	Capcom	Yes	Yes	Yes		
Lost Planet: Extreme Condition	PlayStation 3	February 21, 2008	Capcom	Yes	Yes	Yes	Yes	
Lost Planet: Extreme Condition	Microsoft Windows	June 26, 2007	Capcom		Yes	Yes	Yes	
Lost Planet: Extreme Condition	Xbox 360	December 21, 2006	Capcom	Yes	Yes	Yes	Yes	
Lost Planet: Colonies	Xbox 360	January 12, 2007	Capcom	Yes	Yes	Yes	Yes	
Lost Planet 2	PlayStation 3	May 11, 2010	Capcom	Yes	Yes	Yes		
Lost Planet 2	Microsoft Windows	October 12, 2010	Capcom	Yes	Yes	Yes		
Lost Planet 2	Xbox 360	May 11, 2010	Capcom	Yes	Yes	Yes		
Lost Planet 3	PlayStation 3	August 27, 2013	Spark Unlimited	Yes	Yes	Yes	Yes	
Lost Planet 3	Microsoft Windows	August 27, 2013	Spark Unlimited	Yes	Yes	Yes	Yes	
Lost Planet 3	Xbox 360	August 27, 2013	Spark Unlimited	Yes	Yes	Yes	Yes	
