= Tokuro Fujiwara =

Japanese video game designer (born 1961)

- 藤原 得郎
- Born: April 7, 1961 (age 65); Japan
- Education: Osaka Designers' College
- Occupations: Video game designer, director, producer
- Years active: 1982–present
- Employer(s): Konami (1982–1983); Capcom (1983–1996); Whoopee Camp (1996–2000)
- Known for: Ghosts 'n Goblins series; Mega Man series; Sweet Home; Resident Evil

Tokuro Fujiwara (藤原 得郎, Fujiwara Tokurō; born April 7, 1961), sometimes credited as Professor F or Arthur King, is a Japanese video game designer, involved in the development of many 1980s and 1990s Capcom video games. He is notorious for making his titles difficult for the average video game player and strict personality among peers. IGN listed Fujiwara at number 13 in its "Top 100 Game Creators of All Time" list.

== Career ==
=== Capcom ===
After a short stint at Konami, Fujiwara joined Capcom in 1983 alongside Yoshiki Okamoto. Fujiwara directed early Capcom titles such as the run-and-gun shooter Commando (1985), the platformers Ghosts 'n Goblins (1985) and Bionic Commando (1987), and the survival horror game Sweet Home (1989). He was also the main producer for the Mega Man series beginning with Mega Man 2 , a producer and advisor for Capcom's Disney games, and worked on the CP System arcade game Strider (1989). He also conceived of Resident Evil as a remake of his earlier game Sweet Home and worked on the game as general producer.

=== Whoopee Camp ===
Fujiwara left Capcom in 1996 to form his own studio, Whoopee Camp. He was joined at the new company by Harumi Fujita, who had composed music for his games at Capcom in the 1980s and 1990s. The studio was short lived, producing only Tomba and Tomba! 2: The Evil Swine Return before its closure in 2000. The company had been developing the PlayStation 2 title Extermination before its closure.

=== Later work ===
Fujiwara worked as a consultant on Extermination (2001). The game was being developed in the same building as Whoopee Camp's office at the time. Fujiwara has occasionally used the Whoopee Camp name since for his projects including Ghosts 'n Goblins Resurrection (2021), and Tomba: Special Edition (2024).

== Works ==
Year	Game	Role
1982	Pooyan	Game design, graphic artist
1983	Roc'n Rope	Game design, graphic artist
1984	Vulgus	Director, graphic artist
1984	Pirate Ship Higemaru	Director, graphic artist
1985	Commando	Director, graphic artist
1985	Ghosts 'n Goblins	Director, graphic artist
1986	The Speed Rumbler	Director, game design
1987	Bionic Commando (Arcade)	Director, game design
1987	Higemaru Makaijima	Advisor
1987	Tiger Road	Director, game design
1988	F-1 Dream	Director, game design
1988	Bionic Commando (NES)	Producer
1988	Ghouls 'n Ghosts	Director, game design
1988	Mega Man 2	Producer
1989	Strider	Game design advisor
1989	Willow (NES)	Producer
1989	Marusa no Onna	Director
1989	DuckTales	Producer, advisor
1989	Sweet Home	Director
1990	Gargoyle's Quest	Producer
1990	Chip 'n Dale Rescue Rangers	Producer, advisor
1990	Adventures in the Magic Kingdom	Producer, advisor
1990	Street Fighter 2010: The Final Fight	Producer
1990	Little Nemo: The Dream Master	Producer
1990	Mega Man 3	Producer
1991	Tenchi wo Kurau II: Shokatsu Kōmei Den	Director
1991	The Little Mermaid	Producer, advisor
1991	Super Ghouls 'n Ghosts	Producer
1991	Who Framed Roger Rabbit	Producer, advisor
1991	Mega Man 4	Producer
1991	TaleSpin	Producer, advisor
1992	Capcom's Gold Medal Challenge '92	Producer
1992	Darkwing Duck	Producer, advisor
1992	Gargoyle's Quest II	Producer
1992	The Magical Quest Starring Mickey Mouse	Producer, advisor
1992	Mega Man 5	Producer
1993	Breath of Fire	Producer
1993	DuckTales 2	Producer, advisor
1993	Final Fight 2	Producer
1993	Goof Troop	Producer, advisor
1993	Mega Man 6	Producer
1993	Disney's Aladdin	Producer, advisor
1993	Chip 'n Dale Rescue Rangers 2	Producer, advisor
1993	Mega Man X	Producer
1994	Mega Man Soccer	Producer
1994	The Great Circus Mystery Starring Mickey & Minnie	Producer, advisor
1994	Demon's Crest	Producer
1994	X-Men: Mutant Apocalypse	Producer
1994	Breath of Fire II	Producer
1994	Mega Man X2	Producer
1995	Mega Man 7	Producer
1995	Mega Man X3	Producer
1995	Disney's Magical Quest 3 Starring Mickey & Donald	Producer, advisor
1995	Final Fight 3	Producer
1996	Resident Evil	General producer
1997	Tomba!	Director, producer, game design, art director
1999	Tomba! 2: The Evil Swine Return	Chief producer, game designer
2001	Extermination	Executive producer
2003	Hungry Ghosts	Director, executive producer
2006	Ultimate Ghosts 'n Goblins	Director, game design
2008	Bionic Commando Rearmed	Consultant
2009	MadWorld	Original game design
2021	Ghosts 'n Goblins Resurrection	Director, game design

== Interviews ==
- Ultimate Ghosts 'n Goblins (1UP)
- The Lair of Hungry Ghosts (Famitsu, translated by GamePro)
- The Man Who Made Ghosts'n Goblins (Famitsu, translated by GlitterBerri)
