= Ghosts 'n Goblins (video game) =

1985 video game

- Arcade flyer
- Developer: Capcom
- Publishers: WW: Capcom; NA: Taito (arcade)
- Director: Tokuro Fujiwara
- Programmer: Toshio Arima
- Artists: Tokuro Fujiwara; Masayoshi Kurokawa
- Composer: Ayako Mori
- Series: Ghosts 'n Goblins
- Platform: Arcade: NES, ZX Spectrum, Amstrad CPC, Commodore 64, Commodore 16, IBM PC, PC-88, Amiga, Atari ST, Game Boy Color, Game Boy Advance, Android, iOS
- Release: September 5, 1985: Arcade; JP: September 5, 1985; NA/EU: October 1985 NES; JP: June 13, 1986; NA: November 1986; EU: March 23, 1989 ZX Spectrum; EU: June 1986 C16, C64, CPC; EU: 1986 IBM PC; NA: 1987 PC-88; JP: 1987 Amiga, Atari ST; UK: 1990 Game Boy Color; NA: January 20, 2000; EU: August 24, 2000 Game Boy Advance; JP: May 21, 2004 iOS, Android; WW: March 15, 2017
- Genre: Platform
- Modes: Single-player, multiplayer

Ghosts 'n Goblins, known as Makaimura (Note: Japanese: 魔界村, Hepburn: Makai-mura; lit. "Demon World Village") in Japan, is a 1985 platform game developed and published by Capcom for arcades. It is the first game in the Ghosts 'n Goblins franchise, and has since been ported to numerous home platforms.

It was a major commercial success across arcades and home systems. It was among the top ten highest-grossing arcade games of 1986 in Japan and the US, as well as the year's sixth best-selling computer game in the UK, with the Nintendo Entertainment System version selling over 1.6 million units worldwide. It initially received generally positive reviews from critics; it is often cited as one of the most difficult games of all time, and has retrospectively been considered one of the greatest video games ever made.

== Gameplay ==
Arcade gameplay showing Arthur in his unarmored, boxer shorts-wearing state, which results from the first of only two hits he can take

The player controls a knight named Sir Arthur, who must defeat zombies, giants (referred to as "big men"), demons, cyclopes, dragons, and other monsters to rescue Princess Prin-Prin, who has been kidnapped by Astaroth (also called the Devil or Great Satan, to distinguish him from another boss demon named Satan), king of Demon World. Along the way, the player can pick up new weapons, bonuses, and extra suits of armor that can help in this task.

The player can only be hit twice before losing a life, which results in having to restart the level, or starting at the checkpoint if the player has reached it. Furthermore, the player will lose a life if a level is not completed within a set time limit. Some bosses can not be killed by certain weapons, no matter how many times they are hit with them, such as the dragon with the lance, and the Unicorn with the shield/cross. After defeating Astaroth, the final boss, the player must then replay the entire game on a higher difficulty level to reach the genuine final ending.

== Ports ==
Ghosts 'n Goblins was ported to Amiga, Amstrad CPC, Atari ST, Commodore 64, Commodore 16, Game Boy Color, IBM PC compatibles, PC-88, Nintendo Entertainment System, ZX Spectrum, and Plus/4.

=== Consoles ===
The Famicom version was released on June 13, 1986, and was the first Famicom game to utilize a 128 KB cartridge. The NES version was released in North America in November 1986, and in Europe on March 23, 1989. The Famicom/NES version was programmed by Micronics and published by Capcom. A hidden in-game credits screen verifies that it was scored by the original composer, Ayako Mori.

The Famicom/NES ports served as the basis for the Game Boy Color version, which utilized passwords to allow the player to access certain levels. Allister Brimble scored this version.

=== Computers ===
C64 screenshot

The Commodore 64 version, released in 1986, contains music by Mark Cooksey, which borrows from Frédéric Chopin's Prelude Op. 28, No. 20. Due to the limited resources on the Commodore 64, it was somewhat different from the arcade version as it only features certain levels. In 2015, Ghosts'n Goblins Arcade, a fan-made version more closely matching the original arcade game, was ported to C64.

The version for Commodore 16/116 and Plus/4, also released in 1986 by Elite Systems, was even more limited than the C64 version. It was written to work on a Commodore 16, which had only 16 KB of RAM. Therefore, this version features only two levels and no music. In addition, the remaining two levels and the gameplay are simplified.

A version for the Amiga was released in 1990. While the hardware of the Amiga allowed an almost perfect conversion of the arcade game, it failed to emulate the success of the Commodore 64 version. The player starts the game with six lives, and no music plays unless the Amiga was equipped with at least 1 megabyte of RAM. The standard configuration of an Amiga 500 had 512 kilobytes.

In 2026, Sasvári, Day, Mason & Pankaczy released a new version for the Commodore Plus/4, titled the Ghosts'n Goblins Arcade Version. The game strives to faithfully recreate the classic arcade experience, delivering fast-paced run-and-jump action, impressively optimized for the Plus/4's limited hardware.

Mark Cooksey composed the music for the C64, Amiga, and ST versions, while David Whittaker handled the Amstrad CPC version.

== Reception ==
=== Commercial performance ===
The arcade game was a major hit. In Japan, Game Machine listed Makaimura as the second most popular arcade game for the last two weeks of September 1985, before it went on to be the fourth highest-grossing table arcade game during the first half of 1986 and the overall tenth highest-grossing table arcade game of 1986.

In the United States, advance sales topped a thousand arcade units prior to release in the region, with test units each earning about $400 per week. Ghosts 'n Goblins went on to become America's ninth highest-grossing arcade game of 1986. In the United Kingdom, it had a slow start, initially appearing mainly at pubs and clubs rather than major amusement arcades in late 1985, before the game went on to become a major arcade hit by 1986.

The NES version was a best-seller, with 1.64 million units sold worldwide. On home computers, it was the top-selling game in the United Kingdom for two months during July–August 1986, and it went on to become the sixth best-selling game of 1986 in the UK. The success of Commando (1985) and Ghosts 'n Goblins have been credited as the products "that shot" Capcom to "8-bit silicon stardom" in the mid-1980s.

=== Critical reception ===
Reception

Aggregate score
Aggregator	Score						
Aggregator	Arcade	C64	iOS	NES	PC	Wii	ZX
GameRankings						55%	

Review scores
Publication	Score						
Publication	Arcade	C64	iOS	NES	PC	Wii	ZX
ACE		4/5			4/5 (CPC)		4/5
AllGame	2.5/5			3/5			
Crash							95%
Computer and Video Games	Positive	33/40			32/40 (CPC)		32/40
IGN						6/10	
Nintendo Life						7/10	
Sinclair User							5/5
The Games Machine (UK)		95%		84%			85%
TouchArcade			3/5				
Your Sinclair							9/10
Zzap!64		97%					
Famicom Hisshoubon				4/5, 5/5, 4/5 (Note: Each of the three reviewers in Famicom Hisshoubon ranked the game on a 5 point scale.)			

Awards
Publication	Award
Golden Joystick Awards	Arcade Game of the Year (runner-up)
Famitsu Best Hit Game Awards	Best Port
Crash	Crash Smash
Sinclair User	SU Classic
Computer and Video Games	C+VG Hit
Zzap!64	Gold Medal

The arcade game received a positive review from Clare Edgeley of Computer and Video Games magazine in 1985. Computer Gaming World called the NES version of Ghosts 'n Goblins "an excellent example of what the [NES] can do ... while hardly groundbreaking, [it] represents the kind of game that made Nintendo famous". From contemporary reviews, The three reviewers of the Japanese magazine Famicom Hisshoubon gave the game high rankings and commented on the high level of difficulty. One reviewer commented that it should have not included a level selection option to make it even more challenging.

Ghosts 'n Goblins was runner-up in the category of Arcade Game of the Year at the Golden Joystick Awards. In the 1986 Famitsu Best Hit Game Awards, the Famicom version received the "Best Port" award.

The NES version of Ghosts 'n Goblins was rated the 129th best game made on a Nintendo system in Nintendo Power's Top 200 Games list. Writing in 2007, Marcel van Duyn of Nintendo Life gave the game 7 out of 10 stars, declaring that it provided "appeal and enjoyment" to fans of the series, while criticising its platforming and finding that it was "less fun than its contemporaries".

The game is often cited as an example of one of the most difficult games of all time, due to its extremely hard level design and the fact that the player dies within two hits while the enemies can spawn unexpectedly all over the map. Moreover, the player must play through all of the levels again at a higher difficulty setting unlocked after completing the levels regularly in order to beat the game, without any way to save. Gamerant named it the 5th hardest video game of all time. In a 2011 review, Lucas Thomas of IGN opined that the game was so hard it would be a "waste of time" for most players, as they would not be able to justify the eight-dollar price tag the game had at the time.

== Legacy ==
=== Sequels ===
Ghosts 'n Goblins was followed by a series of sequels and spin-offs eventually becoming Capcom's 8th best-selling game franchise, selling over 4.4 million units. Its sequels include Ghouls 'n Ghosts, Super Ghouls 'n Ghosts, Ultimate Ghosts 'n Goblins and Ghosts 'n Goblins Resurrection in addition to producing the Gargoyle's Quest and Maximo spin-off series. Though originating as an arcade title, the franchise has been featured on a variety of PC and video game consoles with a later entry in the series, Ghosts 'n Goblins: Gold Knights, being released on the iOS. Additionally, the franchise frequently makes cameo appearances — the character of Arthur in particular — in other Capcom titles, the latest of which being Marvel vs. Capcom: Infinite (in which Firebrand, the Red Arremer that protagonizes the Gargoyle's Quest spin-off, also appears).

=== Re-releases ===
The NES version was also re-released for download for Nintendo's Virtual Console in North America on December 10, 2007 (Wii) and October 25, 2012 (Nintendo 3DS) and in the PAL region on October 31, 2008 (Wii) and January 3, 2013 (Nintendo 3DS) while the Wii U version was released in both regions on May 30, 2013. The arcade version was released on the Wii's Virtual Console Arcade in Japan on November 16, 2010, the PAL region on January 7, 2011 and in North America on January 10, 2011.

The original arcade version of the game was also included in the compilation Capcom Generations Vol.2: Chronicles of Arthur for the PlayStation (in Japan and Europe) and Sega Saturn (in Japan only), which also contained Ghouls 'n Ghosts and Super Ghouls 'n Ghosts. The three games (based on their Capcom Generation versions) were later collected as part of Capcom Classics Collection. The game was also featured in the compilation Capcom Arcade Cabinet for the PlayStation 3 and Xbox 360.

In Japan, the NES version was re-released as part of the Famicom Mini series for the Game Boy Advance.

Nintendo re-released the NES version of Ghosts 'n Goblins as part of the company's NES Classic Edition.

The NES version of Ghosts 'n Goblins was re-released as part of the launch of the Nintendo Classics service, while an SP version, which allows immediate access of the final level, was added to the service on December 13, 2018.
