= Super Ghouls 'n Ghosts =

1991 video game

- North American SNES box art
- Developer: Capcom
- Publishers: JP/NA: Capcom; PAL: Nintendo
- Producer: Tokuro Fujiwara
- Designers: Tatsuya Minami; Kimio Yamazoe
- Programmers: Masatsugu Shinohara; Yoshihiro Matsui
- Artist: Kimio Yamazoe
- Composer: Mari Yamaguchi
- Series: Ghosts 'n Goblins
- Platforms: Super NES, Game Boy Advance
- Release: Super NES: JP: October 4, 1991; NA: November 28, 1991; PAL: December 10, 1992; Game Boy Advance: JP: July 19, 2002; NA: September 23, 2002; PAL: September 27, 2002
- Genre: Platform
- Mode: Single-player

Super Ghouls 'n Ghosts, known as Chō Makaimura (Note: Japanese: 超魔界村, Hepburn: Chō Makaimura; lit. "Super Demon World Village") in Japan, is a 1991 platform video game developed and published by Capcom for the Super Nintendo Entertainment System. The third installment in the Ghosts 'n Goblins series and the first not to be released for arcades, it again depicts knight Arthur saving Princess Guinevere and the kingdom from Emperor Sardius, who has cast a spell that has revived the Ghoul Realm.

The game has been included in multiple compilations of Capcom classics. A remake was released for the Game Boy Advance which features an additional game mode with new stages.

== Gameplay ==
Arthur is surrounded by Zombies in the game's first level's first section, The Haunted Graveyard.

Super Ghouls 'n Ghosts is a side-scrolling platform game with reduced emphasis on run and gun and more on platforming. As in the predecessor Ghosts 'n Goblins, the player takes the role of the knight Arthur, who must save Princess Guinevere and rid the kingdom of the Ghoul Realm which is revived under a spell of Emperor Sardius (known as Samael in the Japanese version), who has kidnapped Guinevere in the Phantom Zone. The game has four difficulty settings (easy, normal, difficult and professional), and the player can set up to nine lives. However, there are also only six continues.

In each of the eight levels (named Quests), five of them consisting of two sections, Arthur, has a time limit to fight ghouls before defeating a Foul Guardian that protects the gate to the next stage. The first five Quests (The Dead Place, The Rotting Sea, Vermilion Horror, The Ghoul's Stomach and The Deep Chill) take place in a variety of locations, such as graveyards, abandoned ships on sea, flame-filled caverns and locales consisting of ice and snow. The final three Quests (The Castle of the Emperor, Hallway of Ghouls and The Throne Room) are areas of Sardius's castle. Parts of the environment, such as earth ground lifting caused by earthquakes, blizzards, heavy sea waves and avalanches, are also threats to Arthur. The second section of the fourth level, depicts Arthur scaling a rotating palace as in Nebulus (1987).

Arthur starts in the Steel Armor with a lance. If he gets hit by an enemy or projectile, he loses his armor and is reduced to his underpants; getting hit again results in the loss of a life. An ability not present in previous series entries is the double jump, which allows Arthur to leap, then jump again when in mid-air. Although there is no control of momentum during a single jump, Arthur can change direction through a double jump. Other weapons can be picked up along the way, such as a faster-speed knife, hatchets, cross bows, daggers, and torches with short arcs that explode on contact. However, only one can be held at a time. Like in Ghouls n' Ghosts, hidden treasure chests can be found for weapons, armor upgrades, and bonus points. Chests have unwanted deadly traps, and a magician, the Conjurer, transforms Arthur into one of four weaker forms temporarily: a baby, a girl, a seal or a wasp. Chests only appear when moving through specific areas of the screen.

Bronze and Gold armor are collectable. A bronze armor equips Arthur with a Weapon of Enchantment, a more powerful version of the weapon he's holding, such as flamed lances, lightning bolt daggers, and even more fiery torches. A gold armor, a new feature for the series, provides him the enchanted weapon plus a Moon Shield, which protects him from one projectile and only works while standing still, and magic that typically hits most of the screen and needs to be charged up.

Sticking with tradition, Super Ghouls 'n Ghosts must be defeated twice; after beating the last Foul Guardian before Sardius in the first playthrough, Guinevere informs Arthur that he cannot kill Sardius without a mysterious weapon named the Goddess's Bracelet, for which Sardius captured the Princess because she once wore it. The Goddess's Bracelet must be found in the second playthrough and used to beat Sardius.

== Development ==
Super Ghouls 'n Ghosts is the third entry of Capcom's Ghosts 'n Goblins series, following Ghosts 'n Goblins (1985) and Ghouls 'n Ghosts (1988), it is also the series' first entry to not be released to the arcade. Leading the 50-member staff, in his first time managing a team, was Tatsuya Minami, who by then already took on positions as artist and producer for console ports of Rush & Crash (1986), Final Fight (1989) and Street Fighter 2 (1991). Capcom's boss assigned Minami to Super Ghouls 'n Ghosts following a two-week break that began after completing Final Fight. By then, the project was stagnant with only the first level completed. The following two years were very turbulent, and the master ROM was remade several times near the end of the deadline. The favorable reviews following a very difficult process inspired Minami to run future projects for Capcom.

== Regional differences ==
The crosses in the game were modified from the original Chō Makaimura, where they resemble church crosses; in Super Ghouls 'n Ghosts, they appear as ankhs. The final boss was also renamed from Samael to Sardius.

The European version removed certain enemies and obstacles in the game to reduce the difficulty and potential slowdown.

== Release ==
A port of the Super NES version of Super Ghouls 'n Ghosts is featured alongside the arcade versions of Ghosts 'n Goblins and Ghouls 'n Ghosts in the video game compilation Capcom Generation: Chronicles of Arthur for PlayStation, which was also released for the Sega Saturn in Japan as Capcom Generation 2. This version is also included in Capcom Classics Collection for the PlayStation 2 and Xbox, and in Capcom Classics Collection: Reloaded for the PlayStation Portable; it is the only console video game in both collections.

The Game Boy Advance version, titled Super Ghouls 'n Ghosts in North America and Europe and Chō Makaimura R in Japan, features an "Arrange Mode" that enables the player to choose from redesigned levels and bosses based on Ghosts 'n Goblins and Ghouls 'n Ghosts, depending on success in keeping the bronze armor, or a higher difficulty tier of the standard levels set upon keeping the golden armor. Unlike the Normal Mode, in Arrange Mode, the Goddess's Bracelet is already accessible during the first playthrough.

The SNES version was released for the Virtual Console on the Wii on March 5, 2007, the Wii U on May 16, 2013, and New Nintendo 3DS on June 23, 2016. The GBA version was also released for the Wii U on October 22, 2015.

Nintendo re-released Super Ghouls 'n Ghosts in the United States and Europe in September 2017 for the Super NES Classic Edition.

Super Ghouls 'n Ghosts was also available as one of the classic games included as part of the Nintendo Classics service.

== Reception ==
Reception

Aggregate score
Aggregator	Score
GameRankings	GBA: 79.71%

Review scores
Publication	Score
ACE	SNES: 915/1000
AllGame	GBA: 4/5
Aktueller Software Markt	SNES: 10/12
Computer and Video Games	SNES: 89/100
Electronic Gaming Monthly	SNES: 36/40
Eurogamer	WII: 6/10
Famitsu	SNES: 27/40
GamePro	GBA: 16.5/20; SNES: 23/25
GameSpot	GBA: 7.4/10; WII: 6.9/10
GameZone	GBA: 9/10; SNES: 90/100
IGN	GBA: 8.5/10; WII: 8/10
Mean Machines	SNES: 94%
Nintendo Life	WII: 9/10; WIIU (GBA): 6/10; WIIU (SNES): 9/10
Nintendo Power	SNES: 16.6/20
Nintendo World Report	WIIU: 6/10
Super Play	SNES: 85%
USgamer	SNES: 3.5/5
Video Games (DE)	SNES: 84%
SNES Force	SNES: 89%
Super Pro	SNES: 85/100

Critics from Electronic Gaming Monthly and the German Video Games magazine called it the best entry in the Ghosts 'n Goblin series.

As with prior Ghosts 'n Goblins games, Super Ghouls 'n Ghosts's very high difficulty was discussed, with Nintendo Life's Damien McFerran declaring it "16-bit gaming at its most unforgiving". Most reviewers opined the challenge was never unfair. A minor criticism was directed at the lack of shooting flexibility, specifically that the player couldn't shoot up or down.

Eurogamer's Dan Whitehead was in the minority on finding the challenge proper. He opined it "relies far too heavily on cheap tricks and blatantly unfair game mechanics to turn an otherwise pleasant platformer into an exercise in cruel frustration", his rationales including inability to change directions during a jump, and superior enemy advantages in terms of movement and ability for foes to shoot through certain objects Arthur could not. Neal Ronaghan of Nintendo World Report and Nadia Oxford of USgamer wrote the player had to be perfect starting at level one. According to Oxford, "every pixel of every level" had to be memorized, such as enemy patterns, power-up locations, platform movement, and the best power-up weapons to kill each enemy. Oxford, as well as reviewers from Nintendo World Report and Super Play, stated the difficulty level was so high some players, even those of average skill, wouldn't enjoy it. Super Play claimed it was hard to beat even a single section without the power-up armors, made worse by how easy it is to lose it. The magazine and Nadia also condemned the absence of a save feature, such as a password or the console's save battery, meaning the game had to be beat in one sitting.

Super Ghouls 'n Ghosts was praised for its replay value. Wrote ACE magazine's David Upchurch, the game was "tough but rarely frustrating, and will keep you coming back again and again until it's been cracked". Upchurch called the control "superb", writing the SNES joypad was so well-designed it made jumping and shooting possible. Super Pro felt it had more depth and replay-a-bility than other arcade ports due to its "exciting" graphics and sound and the "variety and imagination" in its level design. Wrote McFerran: "The fantastic level design, inventive enemies and gripping gameplay lock you in for hours, despite the fact that for a large portion of that time you'll feel like you're banging your head against a wall".

The graphics, sound and level design was lauded, especially by retrospective reviews that called the game the best example of the 16-bit console's capabilities. In Video Games, Julian Eggebrecht found the graphics the best he'd seen on a home console. James Mielke of GameSpot considered the game's color palette ahead of its time. Claimed Super Gamer, "there's a multitude of power-ups, hideously imaginative monsters and fantastic settings, including a beautifully drawn sunken ship." Mean Machines writer Rich, calling the graphics "exceptional", stated the game superseded another one of Capcom's arcade ports to the SNES, U.N. Squadron, in term of backdrops. He and Upchurch highlighted the ice level, particularly its parallax scrolling, layers of snow, and tower section. Nintendo Life staff, in addition to noting the "outstanding sprite work" and "lots of neat little touches in the background", also focused on Mode 7 effects, such as the zooming of enemy sprites and rotating platforms.

Martin Gaksch of Video Games described the game as a mixture of "modern action entertainment and a hodgepodge of innovative ideas". The diversity in gameplay was noted by Upchurch: "One minute Arthur's avoiding showers of skulls from giant stone monoliths, the next he's clambering on top of a stone pillar to avoid being washed away by a giant tidal wave, then he's dodging careening trolleys of flame - and this is all on the first level alone!" On the other hand, Tim Boone, although amazed by the look and sound, found the game just another side-scrolling platformer, which he was already tired of due to the amount of similar titles that existed since the original Ghost 'n Goblins.

A frequent criticism was the slowdown, occurring when several sprites appeared on the screen. Upchurch and McFerran argued it helped in defeating harder enemies. On the other hand, Super Play opined it negatively affected the experience in general, and Craig Harris of IGN found it harder to control Arthur when the game slowed down.

As of June 30, 2017, 1.09 million units of the SNES version were sold since its release in October 1991, making it Capcom's 75th best-selling game of all time. In later years, it was ranked the 76th best all-time Nintendo game by Official Nintendo Magazine, the 231st best by Nintendo Power, and the 22nd best console video game of all time by Electronic Gaming Monthly. The Game Boy Advance version was nominated for GameSpot's 2002 "Best Port of a 16-Bit Classic" award. GamesRadar ranked the game at number 25 in their "the Best SNES games of all time". In 2018, Complex listed the game 22nd in its "The Best Super Nintendo Games of All Time", and opining that Super Ghouls'n Ghosts is "probably the most difficult game in the SNES library." In 1995, Total! placed the game 26th on its Top 100 SNES Games. They praised the game's graphics as "Top notch" and gave praise for the game's classic arcade gameplay, concluding: "It's constantly challenging but also has a wonderfully friendly learning curve." IGN listed the game 51st in their Top 100 SNES Games.
