= Maximo: Ghosts to Glory =

2001 video game by Capcom

- North American cover art
- Developer: Capcom Digital Studios
- Publishers: JP/NA/EU: Capcom; AU: THQ
- Directors: David Siller; Mark Rogers
- Producers: Mark Rogers; Naoto Tominaga
- Designers: David Siller; Scott Rogers; William Anderson
- Programmers: Yoshi Hatano; Narayanan Vaidyanathan; Sean Butterworth; Keith Weatherly
- Artists: Susumu Matsushita; Jonathan Casco
- Composers: Todd Dennis; Chris Rickwood; Howard Ulyate; Shane Keip
- Series: Ghosts 'n Goblins
- Platform: PlayStation 2
- Release: JP: 27 December 2001; NA: 12 February 2002; EU: 1 March 2002; AU: 2002
- Genre: Action-adventure
- Mode: Single-player

Maximo: Ghosts to Glory, known in Japan, Korea, Europe and Australia as Maximo (マキシモ, Makishimo), is a 3D hack and slash platform video game developed by Capcom for the PlayStation 2. The game is based on the Ghosts 'n Goblins universe and features original character designs by Japanese manga artist Susumu Matsushita. The game was followed by a sequel, Maximo vs. Army of Zin in 2003.

== Gameplay ==
Maximo takes place in a dynamic, fully 3D world. The titular character is controlled by the player and can move freely within areas by running, jumping, crouching, and performing other various motions. Gameplay revolves around defeating large numbers of enemies, which can be accomplished by attacking with a sword and shield, and combos and special moves. Like in the Ghosts series, Maximo fights wearing armor. If he is hit, he will lose corresponding pieces of armor and eventually be reduced to wearing his boxer shorts, with another hit resulting in him losing a life. If Maximo loses all his lives, he can continue by giving Death Coins to the Grim Reaper. However, every time he loses all his lives, the required cost for a continue increases. The game features other elements that reference the Ghosts series, such as the ability to crush graves and Maximo turning into an animal after being hit by a spell.

The game features five major worlds: The Boneyard, The Great Dank, Graveyard of Ships, Realm of Spirit and Castle Maximo. Each world has four stages to complete and a boss battle. In a given world, it is mandatory for the player to enter the first stage, and then they can travel to a portal stage with entrances to other stages in that world. These portal stages offer options to save, travel to other worlds and buy health and food. Some enemies also appear in portal stages. After defeating each boss, the player can choose to either receive a health bonus, save the game, or receive a kiss from a rescued sorceress, with a special reward granted for getting kisses from all four sorceresses.

== Plot ==
Maximo, a brave king, returns to his castle from the far off war to find his kingdom is falling with the sorceresses being imprisoned throughout. Worst of yet was that his once trusted advisor Achille has forced Queen Sophia to marry him. He attempts to rescue her from his clutches who has awoken the power of the underworld. However Achille proves too powerful and strikes down Maximo with one blast of his black magic, killing him. Now floating in the underworld, Maximo is approached by a Grim Reaper who reveals that Achille is drilling into the underworld to harvest souls, fueling his undead army. Feeling that he would be out of the job if there are no more dead, the Grim Reaper makes a deal with Maximo to bring him back to life in exchange for stopping Achille's evil plans; sending him back to the earth in the process where his journey begins.

== Development and release ==
Maximo is an attempt to merge the Ghosts 'n Goblins universe with illustrator Susumu Matsushita's manga artwork. The title was originally planned for Nintendo 64 but was delayed for several years and transferred to PlayStation 2.

The concept was created by Capcom Digital Studio head David Siller (creator of Crash Bandicoot and Aero the Acro-Bat) who wanted to bring back "old school" gameplay. The artistic team placed special emphasis on the design and rendering of the characters, as well as putting a great deal of work into the environmental effects. Siller also drew the level designs on paper in pencil and pen. The game's music, which varies from stage to stage, includes orchestrated remixes of the tracks found in Ghouls 'n Ghosts and Ghosts 'n Goblins, arranged by artists from Tommy Tallarico Studios.

Maximo was presented in E3 2001. It was released at the end of the same year in Japan and in early 2002 in the United States, Korea, and Europe.

The game was re-released on the budget labels Greatest Hits in North America and The Best in Japan on the PlayStation 2. It was also re-released on the PlayStation Network for the PlayStation 3 in North America on 4 October 2011 and in Europe on 15 February 2012.

== Reception ==
Reception

Aggregate score
Aggregator	Score
Metacritic	84/100

Review scores
Publication	Score
AllGame	4/5
Edge	7/10
Electronic Gaming Monthly	8.5/10
Eurogamer	8/10
Famitsu	31/40
Game Informer	9/10
GamePro	4.5/5
GameRevolution	B
GameSpot	7.9/10
GameSpy	90%
GameZone	9/10
IGN	9.2/10
Official U.S. PlayStation Magazine	3.5/5
The Cincinnati Enquirer	4/5
Maxim	6/10

The game received "favorable" reviews according to video game review aggregator Metacritic. In Japan, Famitsu gave it a score of 31 out of 40.

The game achieved PlayStation 2 Greatest Hits status in the United States, selling more than 400,000 units in North America. IGN ranked Maximo at #6 on its list of the Top 10 Most Challenging PS2 Games of All Time, saying it was "a real test for true-blooded action-seekers." Complex's Rich Knight named Maximo the 43rd best PlayStation 2 game, believing it successfully captured the spirit of Ghosts 'n Goblins.

== Sequel ==
A sequel titled Maximo vs. Army of Zin was released in 2003, also for the PlayStation 2. Leaked artworks confirmed that a third game began in production in 2004 but was eventually cancelled.
