= Sweet Home (video game) =

1989 role-playing video game

- Developer: Capcom
- Publisher: Capcom
- Director: Tokuro Fujiwara
- Producer: Juzo Itami
- Designer: Tomoshi Sadomoto
- Programmer: Masatsugu Shinohara
- Artists: Hironori Matsumara; Eriko Bando
- Composer: Junko Tamiya
- Platform: Family Computer
- Release: JP: 15 December 1989
- Genre: Role-playing
- Mode: Single-player

Sweet Home (Note: In Japanese: Suwīto Hōmu (Japanese: スウィートホーム)) is a 1989 role-playing video game developed and published by Capcom for the Family Computer. It was developed alongside the horror film Sweet Home, and tells the story of a team of five filmmakers exploring an old mansion in search of precious frescos hidden there. As they explore the mysterious mansion, they encounter hostile ghosts and other supernatural enemies. The player must navigate the intricately laid out mansion, battling with the enemies, and the five main characters with the limited weapons and health restorative items available. The narrative moves forward regardless of whether the characters stay alive, and leads to its five different endings.

The game was directed by Tokuro Fujiwara, who previously worked primarily on arcade games such as Ghosts 'n Goblins (1985). Fujiwara toured the film's set to gather inspiration for the game, and the film's director Kiyoshi Kurosawa gave Fujiwara permission to take some liberties with the game's script. Both the game and film were produced by filmmaker Juzo Itami. Sweet Home was released on 15 December 1989 exclusively in Japan, where it gathered generally favorable reception and was considered better than the film. The game was never localized to western markets, likely because of the game's gruesome imagery and the unpopularity of role-playing games outside Japan.

In retrospect, Sweet Home is considered a landmark game and is often cited for laying the groundwork for the survival horror genre. It served as the main inspiration behind the PlayStation game Resident Evil (1996) which was a massive critical and commercial success, launching a multimedia franchise. Later games would continue to pull inspiration from Sweet Home through the use of quick time events, inventory management, and ghost story elements. Sweet Home's Metroidvania-style exploration, storytelling methods, and horror elements have been cited as precursors to key elements found in other successful games decades later.

== Gameplay ==
Taguchi and Akiko roam the mansion in the English fan translation.

Sweet Home is a role-playing game (RPG) set within a mansion that has a cohesive, intricate layout. There are five playable characters who can venture solo or explore in teams of two or three. The player can switch between characters and parties at any time. The five characters each have a unique item that is necessary to complete the game: a camera, lighter, medical kit, lockpick, and vacuum cleaner. Along with these items are others that can be picked up and dropped anywhere and retrieved later by other characters.

Sweet Home places an emphasis on puzzle-solving, item inventory management, and survival. The player must backtrack to previous locations in order to solve puzzles using items acquired later in the game. In this sense, the interconnected mansion is gradually explored in the style of Metroidvania games. Enemies are encountered randomly and the player must fight or run away through menu-based combat. The battles are presented in a first-person perspective, and there are a variety of enemies, including zombies, ghosts and dolls. The only way to restore health is through tonics scattered across rooms in the mansion.

The story is told through cinematic cutscenes and through optional notes such as secret messages and diary entries of past visitors scattered across the mansion, which also provide clues for solving puzzles. The game also features quick time events when the player comes across a trap that requires a quick decision to be made, or else be killed. When a character dies, they remain dead permanently for the remainder of the game. Items that serve the same purpose as the dead character can be found near their corpse. For example, should the team nurse Akiko die, the team may find pill bottles which can be used to heal ailments. Depending on how many characters remain alive after the defeat of the final boss, there are a total of five different endings the player may receive.

== Plot ==
The story is based on that of the 1989 film of the same name, but the writers took some liberties and expanded on the film's plot. Thirty years prior to the story in 1959, famous artist Ichirō Mamiya hid several precious frescos in his huge mansion before he mysteriously disappeared. In the present day, a team of five documentary filmmakers seek to recover the paintings from the abandoned, dilapidated mansion. Upon entering, they are trapped inside by the ghost of an unknown woman, who threatens to kill all trespassers. The team decides to split up and find a way out, but the mansion is both in danger of collapsing and is occupied by countless monsters.

The team find a projection room, where they find a projector that displays an image of a couple and their baby burning. They discover that the ghost is that of Lady Mamiya, Ichirō's wife. It is revealed that thirty years previously, Mamiya's two-year-old son had fallen in the house's incinerator and was burnt alive, and Mamiya attempted to provide playmates for her son by killing several other children. She committed suicide shortly after and her ghost, unable to forgive herself, became trapped in the mansion. The team arrives in the main chamber and confronts Mamiya in a final battle. After defeating her, a rescuer arrives to help them escape from the mansion as it crumbles.

== Development ==
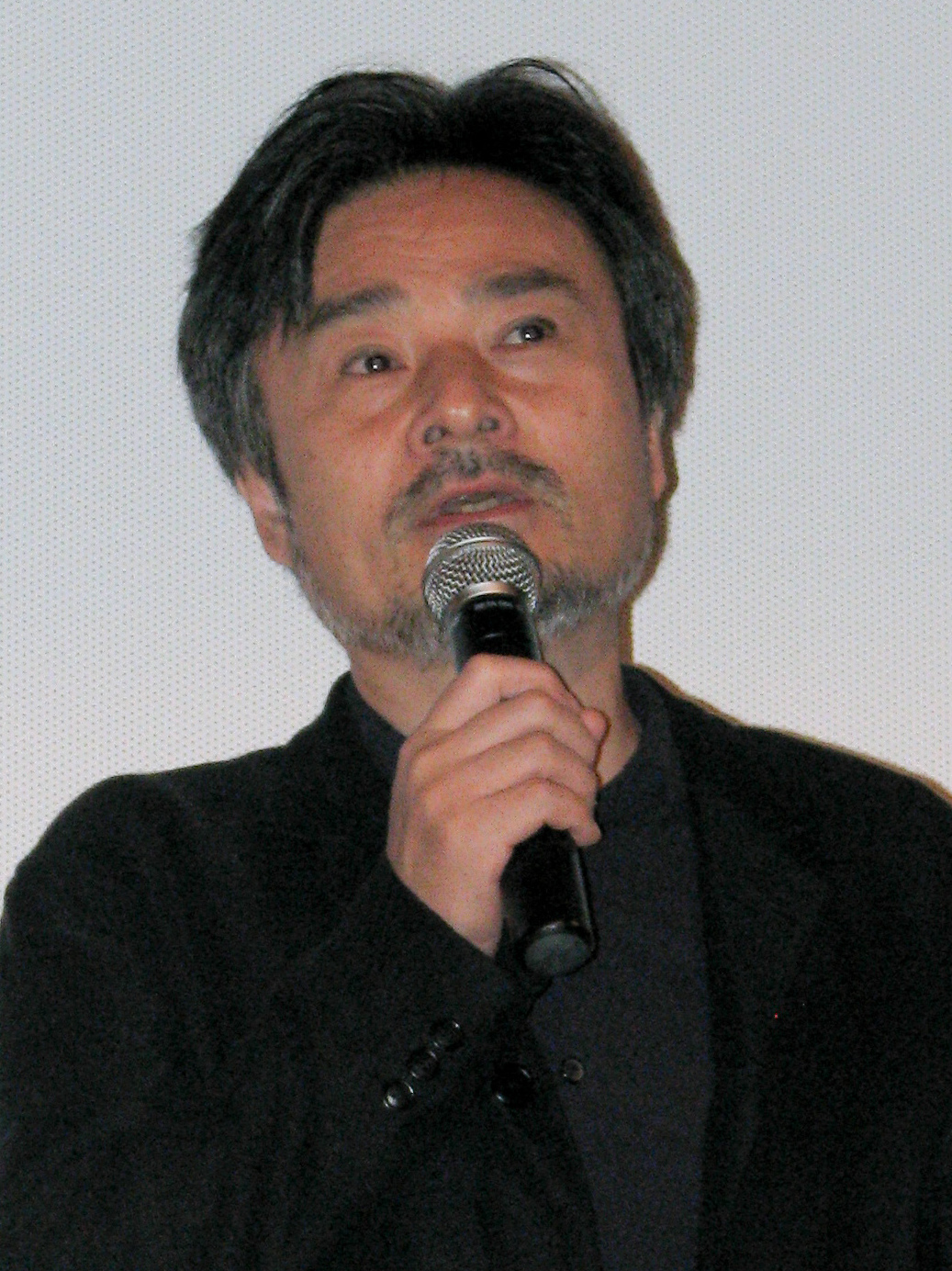
The director of the film, Kiyoshi Kurosawa, supervised the game's production.

Sweet Home was developed by Capcom and directed by Tokuro Fujiwara. He had previously directed Ghosts 'n Goblins (1985) and worked on titles such as Commando (1985), Bionic Commando (1987), Mega Man 2 (1988), and Strider (1989). Sweet Home was one of his first console game projects after working primarily on arcade games. At times he was frustrated by the Family Computer's graphics limitations.

The game is based on the 1989 film of the same name. Juzo Itami, the film's executive producer, and Kiyoshi Kurosawa, its director, served as the game's producer and supervisor respectively. Fujiwara took a tour of the film studio to gather ideas to build the game. Kurosawa told Fujiwara to not concern himself with following the movie exactly. Some of the items Fujiwara wanted to include in his game were ultimately left out because they did not match the atmosphere of the film. The game's plot ended up diverging somewhat from the film's. It was unprecedented at the time for a video game to expand on a film's narrative in this way.

== Release and reception ==
Reception

Review scores
Publication	Score
Famitsu	6/10, 7/10, 8/10, 7/10 (Note: Weekly Famitsu's four reviewers gave Sweet Home individual rankings.); 7/10, 8/10, 9/10, 5/10
Famicom Hisshoubon	4/5

Sweet Home was released for the Famicom in Japan on 15 December 1989. It was promoted alongside the movie in a trailer included with the film's VHS and LaserDisc release. The game received generally favorable reviews, and many critics believed the game was better than the film. The reviewers in Weekly Famitsu complimented the game's unique design and that its graphics and sound effects were appropriately atmospheric for a horror-themed game. The reviewers found the gameplay might be too difficult or tedious for some players. One of the reviewers in Famicom Hisshoubon said it was the best game of the year, commenting that it did not have the annoying traits as taking time to gain experience or making money and complimented the scenario and the fast-paced gameplay. While one reviewer complimented the game for incorporating elements from the film, another dismissed the film as a "dud" and only hoped Capcom would make it an original narrative next time. In the 1989 Famitsu Best Hit Game Awards, Sweet Home received a critics' choice award.

In a retrospective in 1991 of older RPG games, Famitsu reviewers complimented the horror-themes, visuals and puzzle solving involved to progress in the game which they felt made it a unique title. One reviewer commented that their biggest issue is that it was not very long.

Critics believe the game's gruesome imagery dissuaded Nintendo's branches in the Western world from localizing the game. Also, the low popularity of RPGs at the time (at least in North America) may have had an influence on this decision. Although the game was never officially released outside Japan, fans translated Sweet Home to English and released the modified ROM image on the internet in 2000. The translation took over a year to complete. Some hobbyists have loaded the translated ROM onto cartridges to sell through online grey markets.

== Legacy ==
In retrospect, Sweet Home is considered one of the greatest horror games ever made and a landmark in the evolution of horror game design. It is often cited for laying the groundwork for the survival horror genre. Allistair Pinsof of Destructoid believed Sweet Home to be the single best Famicom game and dubbed it "one of the very best games ever made". He also called it one of the first games to realize the potential of a fully cohesive world as in the Metroidvania genre (even though Metroid (1986) attempted it first), and one of the first to use scattered notes and diary logs to tell a story, an element later popularized by BioShock (2007). Peter Tieryas of Kotaku wrote that Sweet Home successfully fused the RPG, adventure, and horror genres, "plunging into the macabre in a way that most other games rarely have." Marty Sliva of 1UP.com wrote that this mixture of genres was a precursor to Parasite Eve (1998). Ben Reeves of Game Informer called it a cult hit and Tokuro Fujiwara's most significant contribution to the video game industry. He continued by saying the entire horror genre "owe[s] a blood debt to this long-forgotten 8-bit game that had no right to be as good as it was".

The horror elements of Sweet Home have received significant praise. Critics believe the game successfully created a haunting experience despite the limited technical capabilities of the Famicom hardware. The staff of Computer and Video Games called it "one of the Famicom's finest technical hours". Tieryas wrote that technical limitations created opportunities for the designers to implement clever gameplay which contributed to the sense of horror. Pinsof agreed and praised the game's structure for creating a tense atmosphere. He wrote that the mansion feels unpredictable and the game is paced well, providing items at just the right moment to maintain the tension. He also praised the innovative and gruesome cinematic imagery. Sliva believed the game had an impressive cinematic quality to it.

=== Influence ===
Sweet Home served as the main inspiration for Capcom's PlayStation game Resident Evil (1996), a game which defined the survival horror genre and spawned a multimedia franchise. The game was directed by Shinji Mikami with Fujiwara acting as producer. Fujiwara believed the basic premise for Resident Evil was to do the things that he was unable to include in Sweet Home, particularly in the sense of graphics. Since Capcom no longer had the rights to the Sweet Home license, they had to invent a new universe, but the game still adopted many elements from Sweet Home. Shinji Mikami, the director of Resident Evil stated in 2024 that he would not be interested in remaking any of his own games, but would be interested in remaking Sweet Home.

Both games placed an emphasis on survival with elements such as the management of a limited inventory and health restoratives scattered throughout the game. Some of Resident Evil's story elements borrow heavily from Sweet Home. Both games are set in a mansion with an intricate layout, the story is told through the use of scattered notes, and there are multiple endings depending on how many characters survive. Other shared elements include the brutal imagery, door loading sequences, puzzles, backtracking, and characters with unique items such as the lockpick and lighter.

Sweet Home's influence carried further into the series than just the first game. It also inspired the GameCube game Resident Evil Zero (2002) which allows the player to switch between characters at will and drop items anywhere on the map for the other character to pick up. Sweet Home's quick time events are considered a precursor to those seen in Resident Evil 4 (2005) and beyond. Resident Evil 7 (2017) also shares similarities to Sweet Home, including the plot of a film crew going to an abandoned house, a paranormal female presence in the house, and a tragic tale involving a family that once lived there. It also pays homage to Sweet Home in a side story told through a VHS tape. Peter Tieryas of Kotaku blamed the decline in critical acceptance of modern Resident Evil offerings on Capcom abandoning the basic gameplay design laid out in Sweet Home.

Sweet Home was also an influence on Otogirisō (1992), an early visual novel game with a horror narrative. The games director, Koichi Nakamura found that there were not many horror games on the market, and recalled that Sweet Home was "so scary that you didn't want to continue playing. I wanted to create an experience where the user would be too afraid to press the button to continue the story, too."
