= Ghosts 'n Goblins =

Video game series

- The Ghosts 'n Goblins series logo as seen in Ultimate Ghosts 'n Goblins
- Genres: Run and gun, platform
- Developers: Capcom, Tose
- Publisher: Capcom
- Creator: Tokuro Fujiwara
- First release: Ghosts 'n Goblins; July 7, 1985
- Latest release: Ghosts 'n Goblins Resurrection; February 25, 2021
- Spin-offs: Gargoyle's Quest; Maximo

Ghosts 'n Goblins, known in Japan as Makaimura (Japanese: 魔界村; lit. "Demon World Village"), is a series of run-and-gun platform video games developed and owned by Capcom. The first entry in the series was Ghosts 'n Goblins, released in arcades on July 7, 1985. The series has subsequently been ported to and released on a variety of personal computers, game consoles and mobile platforms and spawned several sequels and spin-offs.

The main series focuses on the knight Arthur's quest to save princess Prin-Prin from the demon king Astaroth. The primary spin-offs include the Gargoyle's Quest and Maximo game series.

The series as a whole has sold over 4.7 million units as of December 31, 2025 and stands as the 13th best-selling Capcom game franchise. It has gained a reputation among players for its high level of difficulty.

The most recent game in the series, Ghosts 'n Goblins Resurrection, was released on February 25, 2021.

== List of games ==
Release timeline
1985	Ghosts 'n Goblins
1986–1987
1988	Ghouls 'n Ghosts
1989
1990	Gargoyle's Quest
1991	Super Ghouls 'n Ghosts
1992	Gargoyle's Quest II
1993
1994	Demon's Crest
1995
1996	Arthur to Astaroth no Nazomakaimura
1997–1998
1999	Makaimura for WonderSwan
2000
2001	Maximo: Ghosts to Glory
2002
2003	Maximo vs. Army of Zin
2004–2005
2006	Ultimate Ghosts 'n Goblins
2007–2008
2009	Ghosts 'n Goblins: Gold Knights
2010	Ghosts 'n Goblins: Gold Knights II
2011–2020
2021	Ghosts 'n Goblins Resurrection

=== Main series ===
The main series consists of run and gun platformers with players controlling a knight named Arthur who must battle through hordes of the undead in order to rescue the kidnapped princess Prin-Prin (also known as Guinevere, or not named altogether depending on the game/translation) from the demon king Astaroth. Arthur's health and magic level is represented by the armor he wears, with Arthur capable of finding better armor and various weapons in treasure chests hidden throughout the game stages; even so, regardless of how powerful the armor Arthur wears is, he will lose it with a single hit. Once losing his armor Arthur is left only wearing his boxers (an image which has become iconic for the series). In most of the main series, once completing the game the player is forced to re-play the game's stages at a higher difficulty level in order to receive the game's "true" ending. The series has gained a reputation among gamers for its high level of difficulty.

- Ghosts 'n Goblins (1985) (Arcade, Commodore 64, Amiga, ZX Spectrum, Amstrad CPC, Atari ST, IBM PC compatibles, Commodore 16, Game Boy Color, Game Boy Advance, NES, Xbox, Saturn, PlayStation, PlayStation 2, PlayStation Portable, Virtual Console, Nintendo Switch Online, Plus/4)
  - Ghosts 'n Goblins GOLD (2008) (Java) – A port of Ghosts 'n Goblins adapted for the Java platform
  - Ghosts 'n Goblins MOBILE (2017) (iOS, Android) – A port of Ghosts 'n Goblins adapted for mobile platforms
- Ghouls 'n Ghosts (1988) (Arcade, Amiga, Amstrad CPC, Atari ST, Commodore 64, X68000, Saturn, Xbox, PlayStation, PlayStation 2, PlayStation Portable, SuperGrafx, Master System, Genesis, Virtual Console, ZX Spectrum)
- Super Ghouls 'n Ghosts (1991) (SNES, Sega Saturn, PlayStation, PlayStation 2, Xbox, Game Boy Advance, PlayStation Portable, Virtual Console, Xbox Live Arcade, PlayStation Network)
  - Choumakaimura R (2002) (Game Boy Advance) – An enhanced re-mixed version of Super Ghouls 'n Ghosts
- Makaimura for WonderSwan (1999) (WonderSwan)
- Ultimate Ghosts 'n Goblins (2006) (PlayStation Portable)
  - Gokumakaimura Kai (2007) (PlayStation Portable) – An enhanced re-mixed version of Ultimate Ghosts 'n Goblins
- Ghosts 'n Goblins: Gold Knights (2009) (iOS)
- Ghosts 'n Goblins: Gold Knights II (2010) (iOS)
- Ghosts 'n Goblins Resurrection (2021) (Switch, PlayStation 4, Xbox One, Windows)

=== Gargoyle's Quest series ===
The Gargoyle's Quest series is a group of side-scrolling adventure games with mild role-playing video game elements. Players control the character of Firebrand, a character who is based on an enemy in the main series.

- Gargoyle's Quest (1990) (Game Boy)
- Gargoyle's Quest II (1992) (NES)
  - Makaimura Gaiden: The Demon Darkness (1993) (Game Boy) – An enhanced port of Gargoyle's Quest II
- Demon's Crest (1994) (SNES)

=== Maximo series ===
Maximo is a 3D hack and slash platformer series developed by Capcom's US-based Studio 8 for the PlayStation 2. The games are based on the Ghosts 'n Goblins universe and feature original character designs by Japanese illustrator Susumu Matsushita.

- Maximo: Ghosts to Glory (2001) (PlayStation 2)
- Maximo vs. Army of Zin (2003) (PlayStation 2)

=== Other ===
- Arthur to Astaroth no Nazomakaimura: Incredible Toons (1996) (PlayStation, Sega Saturn) – Puzzle game based on Dynamix's Sid & Al's Incredible Toons
- Makaimura Online (NA) (PC) – A licensed Korean MMO game. It began a closed beta in 2010 before proceeding to an open beta in 2013. However, the game never received a full release and the test servers were shut down in 2015.

==== Capcom Party ====
Capcom released a series of Ghosts 'n Goblins-themed Flash based mini-games for Capcom Party; a subscription service related to its Capcom Park i-mode mobile app.

- Small Makaimura (2001) (Flash)
- Puzzle Makaimura (2001) (Flash)
- Puzzle Makaimura Revenge (2002) (Flash)
- Puzzle Makaimura Final (2004) (Flash)

=== Cancelled games ===
- Gargoyle's Quest II: The Demon Darkness (Game Boy western release)
- Ghosts 'n Goblins 3D (PlayStation)
- Ghouls 'n Ghosts 64 (Nintendo 64)
- Maximo: Ghosts to Glory (Nintendo 64, Microsoft Windows, Nintendo GameCube)
- Ghouls 'n Ghosts Online (Microsoft Windows, Apple OSX, PlayStation 2, Nintendo GameCube, Xbox)

==== Arcade gambling machines ====
- Double Fever Makaimura (1987) (Arcade) – A Japanese redemption game
- Gekimakaimura (2005) (Arcade) – A Japanese medal game

=== Appearances in other game series ===
- Higemaru Makaijima – A Red Arremer appears as the end boss.
- Black Tiger – A Red Arremer appears as an enemy.
- Breath of Fire – Paintings of Arthur appear in some homes. The Gargoyle enemies may be a nod to the Red Arremer enemies.
- Cannon Spike – Arthur is a playable character.
- Zack & Wiki: Quest for Barbaros' Treasure – A Ghosts 'n Goblins themed minigame appears.
- We Love Golf! – Arthur is a playable character.
- Dead Rising – An Arthur costume can be worn in the game.
- Super Smash Bros. Ultimate - An Arthur costume for Mii Swordfighters was made available as DLC.

==== Mega Man series ====
- Mega Man 7 – The Ghosts 'n Goblins theme music can be heard at Shade Man's stage through a secret code.
- Mega Man: The Power Battle – The Ghosts 'n Goblins theme music can be heard.
- Mega Man Powered Up – A Ghosts 'n Goblins themed level pack is available for download including an Arthur costume for Roll.
- Mega Man Universe – Arthur was planned as a playable character before the game's cancellation and was featured in the game's teaser trailer.

==== X Capcom series ====
- Namco × Capcom – Arthur is a playable character. Astaroth, Nebiroth, and Red Arremer Joker appear as bosses along with several Ghosts 'n Goblins mob characters. The Demon Village is a major location in the game as well.
- Project X Zone – Arthur is a playable character. Arremers appear yet again as standard enemies.

==== Vs. Capcom series ====
- Marvel vs. Capcom: Clash of Super Heroes – Arthur is an assist character.
- SNK vs. Capcom: The Match of the Millennium – A Ghosts 'n Goblins themed minigame can be played.
- SNK vs. Capcom: SVC Chaos – A Red Arremer is a playable character as well as a secret boss.
- Tatsunoko vs. Capcom – Arthur, Firebrand and Astaroth make cameos in Soki's ending.
- Marvel vs. Capcom 3: Fate of Two Worlds – Arthur appears as a playable character along with a Ghosts 'n Goblins themed stage featuring Astaroth and Red Arremer. Additionally, Firebrand appears in Dormammu's ending.
  - Ultimate Marvel vs. Capcom 3 – Firebrand joins Arthur as a playable character, with Red Arremer King and Zombie Arthur/Bishamon-themed Armor appearing as downloadable costume for these two respective characters.
- Marvel vs. Capcom: Infinite – Both Arthur and Firebrand are playable.

== Comics and manga ==
=== Wan Pakku Comics ===
In 1986, Ghosts'n Goblins was adapted into a manga by Sawada Yukio and published by Wan Pakku Comics, released as a five-part story in the anthology series Hisshō Tekunikku Kan Peki-ban (必勝テクニック完ペキ版).

=== Comic BomBom ===
Super Ghouls 'n Ghosts and Gargoyle's Quest are two of the video games featured in the manga titled Rock'n Game Boy, by Shigeto Ikehara and published by Comic BomBom October 1989 to December 1991.

=== Corocoro Comic ===
Ghosts 'n Goblins, was one of the video games adapted into a manga titled Famicom Ryu (1985–1987) and Nekketsu! Famicom Shounendan (1986–1987), published by Comic Coro Coro.

Super Ghouls 'n Ghosts is one of the video games featuring in the manga titled Cyber Boy, by Nagai Noriaki, Published by Coro Coro Comic and Shogakukan, from 1991 to 1993.

=== Archie Comics ===
The series would later be included in the Archie Comics Worlds Unite crossover along with various other Capcom and Sega franchises, with the Sonic the Hedgehog and Mega Man comic lines providing the backdrop.

== Characters ==
- Arthur: A knight in the service of princess Prin-Prin. Arthur is the main protagonist of the Ghosts 'n Goblins series. He is named for King Arthur of Arthurian Legend.
- Prin-Prin: Princess Prin-Prin is the ruler of the human realm (Ghouls 'n Ghosts specifies the Kingdom of Hus) and the last human with royal blood. She serves as the primary damsel-in-distress of the Ghosts 'n Goblins series. Astaroth kidnaps her in order to use her royal blood to invade the human realm. Although always referred to as Prin-Prin in Japan, she has been called both Prin-Prin and Guinevere in the various American releases. The latter is an allusion to Guinevere of Arthurian Legend.
- Satan: A red beast who appears in both Ghosts 'n Goblins and Super Ghouls 'n Ghosts to kidnap Princess Prin-Prin for the current demon lord, but is only fought in Ghosts 'n Goblins. He is extremely cunning and sets up traps for Arthur in the first game. A similar character appears in the Gargoyle's Quest II called Malgor in the English translation, but he is known as Skull Satan in Japan, implying they are the same character. In the game, he is almost perfectly impersonating King Darkoan for Breager, showing his cunning nature. However, Firebrand sees through his disguise and defeats him. He returns as the boss of the Cave of the Occult in Ghosts 'n Goblins: Resurrection. He is named for Satan in the Abrahamic religions.
- Astaroth: A demon king and the main antagonist of the Ghosts 'n Goblins series. When near death he transforms into the undead demon king Nebiroth, a separate entity and personality from Astaroth. He is named for Astaroth, a demon found in medieval demonology. Some English translations refer to him as The Devil or Great Satan, the latter to distinguish him from Satan.
- Lucifer: Also known as Rushifell in Gargoyle's Quest and Gargoyle's Quest II, and alternatively referred to as Loki in the Sega Genesis version of Ghouls 'n Ghosts. Lucifer is an extremely powerful noble in the demon realm and serves as the final boss of Ghouls 'n Ghosts and Ghosts 'n Goblins Resurrection. In the Gargoyle's Quest series he functions as both a rival and assisting character, testing and then aiding Firebrand in reaching his full potential. He is named for Lucifer, an entity found in Greek mythology and later Christianity. His alternate name Loki is a reference to Loki of Norse mythology.
- Sardius: Known as Samael in Japan, he is the main antagonist and final boss of Super Ghouls 'n Ghosts. He is named for Samael of Talmudic lore.
- Hades: The Lord of Darkness who governs the Demon World in Ultimate Ghosts 'n Goblins. He seeks two goals in his invasion of the Human Realm: to destroy Arthur, and to use the Prin Prin's blood to create a mixed-blood union between humans and demons, giving the demons dominance over the humans. He resides in a stronghold dubbed the Black Palace, with Astaroth serving as his lieutenant. He returns as the true final boss of the shadow levels in Ghosts 'n Goblins: Resurrection. The usage of Hades is an allusion to Hades in Greek mythology.
- Lancelot: One of Arthur's knights with a unique jump attack, appearing as an alternative playable character in Ghosts 'n Goblins: Gold Knights. In Ghosts 'n Goblins: Gold Knights II, he is kidnapped and brainwashed to fight Arthur. The usage of the name Lancelot is an allusion to Lancelot of Arthurian Legend.
- Perceval: One of Arthur's knights and a powerful short-range fighter with a unique dash attack, who teams up with Arthur to rescue Lancelot in Ghosts 'n Goblins: Gold Knights II. The usage of the name Perceval is an allusion to Perceval of Arthurian Legend.
- Firebrand: Known as The Red Arremer in Japan, Firebrand is the main protagonist of the Gargoyle's Quest series. He belongs to a race of gargoyled demons known as the Red Arremer Tribe, considered the elite warriors of the demon king Astaroth. He is considered a hero among his peers, and as such he has been nicknamed Red Blaze (a title shared with his ancestor in Gargoyle's Quest II, also named Firebrand) due to his bright red skin and prowess with fiery magic. The Red Arremer tribe appears as standard enemies in the main Ghosts 'n Goblins series, while a fiery blue silhouette of a Red Arremer serves as the series' logo.
- Breager: An evil conqueror from another dimension that serves as the main antagonist of Gargoyle's Quest. Firebrand is sent to destroy Breager and save the Demon Realm. In the prequel game Gargoyle's Quest II, Breager also attempted to conquer the Demon Realm but was defeated by Firebrand's ancestor.
- Phalanx: A rival demon to Firebrand and the main antagonist of Demon's Crest. Using the power of magical Crests that he stole from Firebrand, he rules and oppresses the Demon Realm. His chief general is Arma, who confronts Firebrand multiple times during his quest to destroy Phalanx.
- Maximo: The main protagonist of the Maximo series. Maximo is a king who is slain by his adviser Achille. He strikes a deal with Grimm, the grim reaper, in order to rescue his betrothed, Sophia.
- Grimm: The grim reaper who frees Maximo from limbo and aids him on his journey in exchange for killing Achille.
- Sophia: The primary damsel in distress of the Maximo series. Sophia is Maximo's betrothed, kidnapped at the beginning of Maximo: Ghosts to Glory.

== Development ==
The Ghosts 'n Goblins franchise was created by Tokuro Fujiwara (also known for producing games in the Mega Man franchise) and is produced by Capcom. Toshio Arima served as lead programmer and Ayako Mori composed the score for the original arcade release in 1985.

== Music ==
The original score for the initial arcade release of Ghosts 'n Goblins was composed by Ayako Mori. The music developed for the game's first level, entitled "Graveyard, Forest & Ice Palace," has since become recognized as the official theme for the franchise, appearing in a re-mixed form in every entry of the main series as well as making cameo appearances in other Capcom games such as Mega Man 7 and Ultimate Marvel vs. Capcom 3. Tamayo Kawamoto composed the score for Ghouls 'n Ghosts, the next entry in the series, followed by Mari Yamaguchi for Super Ghouls 'n Ghosts (with Tomohiro Masuda and Nobuhiko Isa handling the GBA re-release), and Masaya Tsunemoto and Kazuhiro Kotani for Ultimate Ghosts 'n Goblins. The score for the Gargoyle's Quest spin-off series was composed by Harumi Fujita (I) and Yuki Iwai (II) (with Norihiko Togashi handling the Game Boy re-release of Gargoyle's Quest II).

To commemorate the 20th anniversary of the franchise, Capcom released the Makaimura Ongakutaizen in Japan on December 28, 2005. This 7 disc boxed set featured over 350 tracks and was a complete soundtrack for the series to date, featuring the complete scores of not only every entry of the Ghosts 'n Goblins and Gargoyle's Quest series, but also of every PC and home console port of each game therein. In reference to the series' soundtrack as a whole, one reviewer stated:

With each of Makaimura's original scores, Capcom's composers and sound programmers pushed various consoles to the limits to produce high quality scores. With Makaimura, Daimakaimura, and Choumakaimura, the series evolved admirably to refine a dark action-packed orchestral sound that fitted the scenes of the games. The classic series is especially strong thematically, remembered not just for the first stage theme but for other striking compositions. The series has demonstrated plenty of diversity over the years with the Baroque-influenced approaches to Makaimura for WonderSwan and the Red Arremer titles, the exceptionally ambient score to Demon's Blazon Makaimura Monshou Hen, and the dabs of avant-garde and rock influence in the classic series. All these factors considered, the series has secured the legacy of being one of the most musically and technologically influential video game franchises.

Capcom released a soundtrack for Ultimate Ghosts 'n Goblins on September 30, 2006.

== Reception ==
The Ghosts 'n Goblins franchise stands as Capcom's 13th best-selling game franchise, having sold over 4.7 million units. It is generally well regarded by critics and somewhat notorious for its traditional high level of difficulty. Additionally, the franchise frequently makes cameo appearances (the character of Arthur in particular) in other Capcom titles, the latest of which being Ultimate Marvel vs. Capcom 3.

The main series starring Sir Arthur and Princess Prin-Prin was initially released as an arcade title in 1985 and subsequently re-released and ported to a variety of home computer consoles. It continues as an active intellectual property for Capcom with its latest release in 2021 on the Nintendo Switch. The NES release of Ghosts 'n Goblins was rated as the 54th best NES game of all time by IGN and the 124th best game on a Nintendo console by Nintendo Power. The game is considered by GameTrailers to be the world's second most difficult game ever made. As of 2008, the original Ghosts 'n Goblins is Capcom's 18th best selling title, having sold over 1.6 million units. Similarly, Super Ghouls 'n Ghosts is Capcom's 42nd best selling title, having sold over 1 million units.

The main series went on a minor hiatus after the release of Super Ghouls 'n Ghosts in 1991. Capcom general producer Noritaka Funamizu explained that the Ghosts 'n Goblins games take a long time to develop and were not popular in Japan; as a result, Capcom had taken a net loss on previous installments and were wary of producing a new entry. With the exception of the largely overlooked Makaimura for WonderSwan which was released only in Japan, and a re-release of Super Ghouls 'n Ghosts on the Game Boy Advance, the main Ghosts 'n Goblins series did not see a major release until Ultimate Ghosts 'n Goblins on the PlayStation Portable in 2006. The return of the series received mixed to positive reviews. GameSpot noted that the entry would appeal to fans of the original, but that many of the old-school game mechanics including level design and jump mechanics, along with the traditional level of difficulty, may not appeal to the current generation of gamers. These concerns were echoed by such sites as GameDaily and AtomicGamer. Other sites such as IGN and GameCritics praised this adherence to the series' old-school mechanics and traditional level of difficulty, while noting that the new health, armor, and waypoint systems as well as tiered difficulty options went a long way in adjusting the difficulty for new gamers. Ultimate Ghosts 'n Goblins was also the first entry in the series to employ 3D graphics, a fact praised by most reviewers: "The 3D graphics enhance the 2D gameplay by giving the world a sense of depth without interfering with the gameplay, and the whole package simply glows with vibrant color and lighting effects."

The Gargoyle's Quest spin-off saw a series of releases between 1990 and 1994. The introduction of RPG elements in Gargoyle's Quest was praised, however reviewers noted an uneven level of difficulty. Demon's Crest was highly regarded as "one of the finest action titles on SNES, and without a doubt the crowning achievement of the Ghosts 'n Goblins line" by critics; however, it went largely unnoticed in terms of sales being labeled a "major flop". Similarly, the Maximo spin-off sub-series was initially well-received, though criticized for being difficult and inaccessible. Ghosts to Glory (2001) achieved PlayStation 2 Greatest Hits status in the United States, selling more than 400,000 units in North America. IGN ranked the game as the 6th most difficult game on the PlayStation 2. A sequel, Maximo vs. Army of Zin was released in 2003 with better critical reception but faltering sales, ultimately leading to the cancellation of Maximo 3. The future of both the Gargoyles Quest and Maximo spin-off series is unknown.
