= Zack & Wiki: Quest for Barbaros' Treasure =

2007 video game

- Developer: Capcom
- Publisher: Capcom
- Director: Eiichiro Sasaki
- Producer: Hironobu Takeshita
- Designer: Haruki Suetsugu
- Programmer: Akihiro Kashimoto
- Artist: Hiroshi Yūgen
- Writer: Kosuke Nasu
- Composers: Shinya Okada; Tadayoshi Makino
- Platform: Wii
- Release: NA: October 23, 2007; JP: October 25, 2007; EU: January 18, 2008; AU: February 21, 2008; KR: April 26, 2008
- Genres: Point-and-click adventure, puzzle
- Mode: Single-player

Zack & Wiki: Quest for Barbaros' Treasure (Note: Known in Japan as Takarajima Z: Barubarosu no Hihō (Japanese: 宝島Z バルバロスの秘宝; lit. "Treasure Island Z: Barbaros' Secret Treasure")) is an adventure puzzle video game developed and published by Capcom for the Wii video game console. It was first released in North America on October 23, 2007, and was later released in Japan, PAL regions, and as one of eight Wii launch games in South Korea. The game stars the aspiring pirate Zack and his monkey friend Wiki. Shortly after joining a pirate gang called "The Sea Rabbits", the pair discovers a talking skull belonging to the legendary pirate captain Barbaros. In exchange for helping find all the pieces of the captain's cursed body, Barbaros promises to lead Zack and Wiki to the coveted "Treasure Island" and his legendary pirate ship.

Inspired by traditional graphic adventure games, Zack & Wiki features a unique way of puzzle-solving by coupling a point-and-click interface with gesture mechanics using the Wii Remote. In each level, the player is tasked with reaching a treasure chest by guiding Zack with an onscreen cursor and then interacting with objects to solve puzzles leading to the treasure. The Remote is used for mimicking actions such as pulling levers, turning keys, and pouring liquids. Shaking the Remote also rings Zack's companion Wiki like a bell, which transforms any nearby enemies into usable tools for solving each level's numerous puzzles.

Zack & Wiki received highly positive reviews from critics, with particular praise given to the game's controls, unique gameplay, and originality. It was also nominated for numerous awards. Despite this, the game was a commercial failure, leading to Capcom announcing that there would not be a sequel to the game. Nevertheless, in 2016 the game was rereleased digitally for the Wii U via the console's eShop.

== Gameplay ==
Shaking the Wii Remote rings Wiki, changing a frog into a ticking timebomb.

Zack & Wiki: Quest for Barbaros' Treasure is presented as a third-person perspective adventure game. In each stage, the player is required to overcome obstacles by solving puzzles and advance towards a treasure chest. The player controls the actions of hero Zack through the Wii Remote by pointing to objects on the screen, identified by an on-screen cursor, and having Zack move about the level and investigate objects and contraptions. Creatures and enemies in the level can be transformed into practical items by holding the Wii Remote vertically and shaking it left to right, causing Zack to shake his ally Wiki like a bell. When the player has Zack interact with a usable item, the game shifts to a first-person view and the player is prompted to mimic the operation of the item with the Wii Remote. For example, in one of the game's earlier puzzles, the player must create a bridge out of a tree. This is done by ringing Wiki to change an enemy centipede into a saw, then using the tool to cut down the tree by holding the Wii Remote horizontally and moving it back and forth in a sawing motion. The game contains over 80 different gestures, which range from pulling levers to playing a flute.

Successful actions award the player a set number of "HirameQ" points based on the cleverness of the action, how many attempts it takes to perform the action correctly, and its difficulty level. After reaching a treasure chest, the player must exorcise the evil spirits covering it by ringing Wiki. The game then tallies up the total number of HirameQs in a level and gives the player a grade based on performance. Zack's reputation as a pirate will improve with a higher HirameQ total and as more treasures and items are found throughout the game. While not exploring levels, the player has the opportunity to return to Zack and Wiki's pirate hideout to access a treasure library, send fellow pirate Maddy out to search for secret treasure, and purchase "Oracle Dolls" and "Platinum Tickets" using money found in each stage. Platinum Tickets allow the player to continue if they die during a mission. Oracle Dolls can be traded for a hint at any time during a stage.

== Synopsis ==
Zack & Wiki: Quest for Barbaros' Treasure details the adventures of Zack, a human boy whose dream is to become the greatest pirate in history. He is accompanied by his best friend Wiki, an enchanted golden monkey Zack found with no memory of his past, capable of turning into a bell and transforming other creatures into objects. The two are members of the Sea Rabbits, a pirate crew made up of anthropomorphic rabbits, including leader Captain Hulk, pilot Johnny Style, elderly Granny, and crewmen Dimmy, Maddy and Loafrey. The Sea Rabbits frequently clash with rival pirate gang the Rose Rock and their leader Captain Rose, a spoiled girl who believes all the world's treasure is hers for the taking. Early in the game, Zack and Wiki meet the infamous pirate captain Barbaros, who has been reduced to an animate golden skull due to unknown magic, and he promises to reward the two if they find the missing pieces of his body.

=== Plot ===
While flying to the Sea Rabbits' hideout, Zack and Wiki are attacked by the Rose Rock and their seaplane is shot down. Crash-landing on a tropical island, they discover a treasure chest containing the talking skull of Barbaros, who seems to recognize Wiki. He promises to give the two his legendary pirate ship and lead them to "Treasure Island", a mythical island filled with untold riches, if they will restore his body by collecting its various pieces scattered around the world. Agreeing to his terms, Zack and Wiki begin traveling the world, exploring a jungle, a frozen ruin, a volcano, and Barbaros' haunted castle, and finding treasure maps leading to each of the missing pieces. Along the way, they continue to vie with Captain Rose, who is also after the pieces of Barbaros in hopes of finding Treasure Island.

Upon finding the last missing piece, Zack rings Wiki in order to restore Barbaros to his former self. Now human again, Barbaros turns on Zack, revealing he had planned to keep the ship and the contents of Treasure Island for himself from the beginning. He also reveals that Wiki was the one who originally cursed him, something Wiki had forgotten. Barbaros then casts the duo into a pit and departs for Treasure Island.

Zack and Wiki escape and are retrieved by Johnny and the Rose Rock, with Rose having agreed to join forces with the Sea Rabbits in exchange for access to Treasure Island. They trail Barbaros to the island, which floats in a gap at the center of the planet. There, Barbaros finds and imprisons the heroes, using Wiki to restore his undead crew. However, Zack manages to outsmart Barbaros and free the others, and they escape with Barbaros' ship as Treasure Island begins collapsing into a wormhole. During their escape, Barbaros attempts one final assault using a large mechanized creature, but Zack repels this attack and uses Wiki to turn Barbaros back into a skeleton. The three are sucked into the wormhole, but Wiki sacrifices himself so Zack can escape. Back at the Sea Rabbits' hideout, Zack remains despondent about the loss of Wiki, but hears a familiar bell ringing and rushes out to find a chest washed up on shore. The game ends as Zack opens the chest.

== Development ==
Zack & Wiki: Quest for Barbaros' Treasure was directed by Eichiro Sasaki and produced by Hironobu Takeshita. Sasaki had previously worked on other Capcom titles such as Power Stone and Resident Evil Outbreak; Takeshita had previously worked on titles in the Breath of Fire series and Ultimate Ghosts 'n Goblins. Since joining Capcom, Sasaki had wanted to design a point-and-click adventure game, having been inspired by such titles as Princess Tomato in the Salad Kingdom and Dezeniland. The idea of creating such a game came about before the Wii console's announcement. Development began in autumn or winter of 2005 with an early version of the game created within a six-month period using a trial-and-error approach. At the production's peak, a total of around 55 people were working on Zack & Wiki, and it had decreased to 40 people near its completion. Five individuals were primarily responsible for creating the game's puzzles; programmers and other staff often submitted their own ideas and suggestions for the puzzles.

The "guide cursor system" was added to allow more people to participate in this single-player game.

According to Takeshita, the Wii Remote lent itself well to this kind of gameplay: "We wanted players to be able to enjoy the puzzle solving aspects of the game without getting bogged down with complicated controls". One of the team's goals was to successfully combine cognitive puzzle solving with the physical gestures using the Wii Remote. They had technical difficulty fine-tuning this gesture system to be used by anybody, as all players gesture differently. Although Zack & Wiki was initially designed for players in their early teens, Takeshita was confident that the game could be enjoyed by players of all ages. The game's inclusion of both logically and instinctively solved puzzles, as well its colorful cel-shaded presentation and mostly traditional storyline and characters, were also designed to appeal to wide range of audiences. The design team decided in the early stages of the game's development that if the player dies, they must start that specific puzzle over from the beginning. Because many people complained about this aspect in the game's testing phase in America, they added the ability of the player to buy their way back to life. From the project's start, Zack & Wiki was designed as a single-player video game. About midway though development, the design team decided to include the "guide cursor system", in which additional people may use their own Wii Remotes to aid the player by drawing and pointing out elements with cursors. Takeshita emphasized that this system would create a kind of "party-style atmosphere" for those wanting to enjoy the game with friends. Although Nintendo Wi-Fi Connection support was announced for the game when it was first revealed, this feature was later dropped.

The pirate theme of Zack & Wiki was decided in its conceptual stage. The game was first announced by Capcom under the working title "Project Treasure Island Z" in March 2007 and was officially unveiled at Capcom's San Francisco Gamer's Day that April. The title was changed in the English localization shortly thereafter due to international copyright conflicts relating to the similarly themed novel Treasure Island by Robert Louis Stevenson. The developer went through nearly 200 names before settling on the final one, which Takeshita explained was descriptive of the main characters and plot and, in order to appeal to children, a name one may associate with a kids' cartoon series.

== Release ==
Leading up to its October release date, the newly titled game was featured at several gaming conventions and tradeshows including Japan's annual World Hobby Fair, San Diego Comic-Con, the Leipzig Games Convention, the Electronic Entertainment Expo (E3), and the Tokyo Game Show. In a promotional video for the game first shown at E3, Zack & Wiki featured background sounds after accomplishing certain tasks. One such sound used in the video was the Islamic prayer "Allāhu Akbar" ("God is great"), which was repeatedly used as players worked on a puzzle while tribal islanders prayed around a totem. After receiving complaints and being contacted by the Council on American-Islamic Relations, Capcom removed the phrase from the game.

Zack & Wiki was advertised differently in each region of release. In Japan, the game was promoted by television personality Kusano Hitoshi. A related manga titled Takarajima Z Bara Shoku no Shinju (宝島Z バラ色の真珠; lit. Treasure Island Z: Rose-colored Pearl) began publication in the premiere issue of Kerokero Ace magazine on October 21, 2007. According to Christian Svensson, the company's Vice President of Strategic Planning and Business Development, Capcom's outreach was largely "family-targeted" rather than for core-gamers. Additionally, despite prominent television advertising in the Japan, the developer wanted to rely on "word of mouth" to market the game in the United States, as it had done with the Ace Attorney series. Capcom later sent out an online reviewer's guide for the press and made a Flash demo available on the game's official website. To promote the game in South Korea, Capcom included a mousepad and a tiny treasure chest containing a candy necklace with each copy preordered. One hundred of these preorders were to have a real pearl necklace in place of the candy one.

== Reception ==
Reception

Aggregate scores
Aggregator	Score
GameRankings	86% (Note: Score based on 62 reviews)
Metacritic	87/100 (Note: Score based on 59 reviews)

Review scores
Publication	Score
1Up.com	A
Eurogamer	8/10
Famitsu	33/40
GameSpot	8.5/10
GameSpy	4.5/5
GameTrailers	8.4/10
IGN	9/10
NGamer	9.0/10
Official Nintendo Magazine	94%
X-Play	4/5

Zack & Wiki: Quest for Barbaros' Treasure received "generally favorable reviews" according to review aggregator platforms GameRankings and Metacritic.

Leading up to an official announcement on June 18, 2007, Matt Casamassina, the editor-in-chief of IGN's Nintendo Channel, and Mark Bozon had been praising the game for its originality and unique gameplay. In an announcement for the "Buy Zack & Wiki Campaign", Casamassina officially stated that the two would make it their obligation to make sure that as many people as possible will buy the game upon its release.

=== Awards ===
Zack & Wiki received a number of honors, awards, and nominations from the gaming community and by various news and video game publications alike. It received a Gold Award from Official Nintendo Magazine and an "Editor's Choice" label from both IGN and GameSpy. The game won "Best Wii Controls" for 2007 by NGamer magazine and "Adventure Game of the Year" from GameSpot. It was also included on IGN's "20 Wii Games You Should Already Own" and Gaming Target's "52 Games We'll Still Be Playing From 2007".

Zack & Wiki was named one of the best games for kids in 2007 by USA Today, one of the best family games of the year by MSNBC, the ninth best video game of the year by Fox News, and the 27th best game of the year by The Daily Telegraph. The game's control tutorial, in which the player falls out of a plane and must make a parachute out of an umbrella, was called one of the "Greatest Gaming Moments of 2007" by MTV.

Other awards, nominations and accolades included:

- 2nd best game of 2008 (Official Nintendo Magazine)
- 7th best Wii game of 2007 (Nintendo Power)
- 11th best Wii game (IGN in 2009)
- Game of the Month, October 2007 (IGN)
- E3 2007 Runner-up Best Adventure Game: Overall (IGN)
- E3 2007 Best Adventure Game: Wii (IGN)
- E3 2007 Best Artistic Design: Wii (IGN)
- Best Puzzle/Parlor Game: Overall (GameTrailers)
- Nominee Best Social/Casual/Puzzle Game (Game Critics Awards)
- Nominee Game of the Year 2007 (1UP.com)
- Nominee Adventure Game of the Year 2007 (1UP.com Editor's Choice Awards)
- Overlooked Console Gem 2007 (1UP.com Editor's Choice Awards)
- Japan Game Critics Future Award 2007
- Most Surprising Game 2007 (Nintendo World Report)
- Runner-up Wii Best Value 2007 (Nintendo World Report)
- 26th Best Wii Game (GamePro in 2009)
- 25 Games You Shouldn't Overlook (GamePro)
- Runner-up 2007 Wii Game of the Year (Kotaku)
- Nominee Most Original Game 2007 (X-Play)

=== Sales ===
IGN's GamerMetrics had predicted that Zack & Wiki, along with Super Mario Galaxy and Resident Evil: The Umbrella Chronicles, would see a sales boost from the year-end delay of the highly anticipated Wii fighting game Super Smash Bros. Brawl. However, Zack & Wiki sold only 300,000 copies worldwide by the end of Capcom's fiscal year 2008. The game sold fewer than 35,000 units in the United States in November 2007 and continued to grow "steadily" in the following months, still yielding much lower sales numbers than other third-party Wii titles from Capcom. After several price drops, Zack & Wiki managed to sell 126,000 units in the region within 26 months of release. Capcom's Senior Director of Communications Chris Kramer described these numbers as "abysmal". The game reached number 29 in the Japanese sales charts during its release week, selling 26,658 units there by the end of 2007. Zack & Wiki reached number 17 in the UK in the all format games charts during its first few days on sale in the country. Finally, the game sold about 8,000 units in South Korea in its first month during the Wii's launch there. Kramer reasoned that the game sold poorly due to the then-current Wii market being "tough to crack" and "ever-shifting" for the third-party publishers lacking knowledge regarding Wii software consumers. Capcom Product Manager Colin Ferris partially blamed the art design for the main character Zack on the game's sales: "Well, you know, Zack & Wiki... Another one in a long line of very highly rated Capcom games that unfortunately did not sell very well. We can take a part of the blame on ourselves by having it star a shirtless boy pirate. That is actually a personal favorite of a lot of people in Capcom, so don't be surprised if you see it again but we have nothing in the works at the moment". Capcom reported in June 2008 that it would not be announcing a Zack & Wiki sequel anytime soon.
