= Makaimura for WonderSwan =

1999 video game

- Developer: Capcom
- Publisher: Bandai
- Producer: Toshihiro Suzuki
- Series: Ghosts 'n Goblins
- Platform: WonderSwan
- Release: JP: July 22, 1999
- Genres: Platform, action
- Mode: Single-player

Makaimura for WonderSwan (Note: Japanese: 魔界村 for WonderSwan, Hepburn: lit. Demon World Village for WonderSwan) is a game for the WonderSwan developed by Capcom, published by Bandai in 1999 and is the fourth game in the mainline series of the Ghosts 'n Goblins franchise.

== Gameplay ==
Sharing similar gameplay to its predecessors, Makaimura also shares enemies, weapons and backgrounds from the previous three games. Unique features include diverging paths between the second and fifth levels, swimming in water, and a level which requires the player to rotate the WonderSwan by 90 degrees as Arthur climbs and swings down a rope in a vertical shaft.

== Development ==
Makaimura for WonderSwan was developed by Capcom.
