= Maximo vs. Army of Zin =

2003 video game

- European cover art
- Developer: Capcom Production Studio 8
- Publisher: Capcom
- Director: Mark Rogers
- Producer: Mark Rogers
- Designers: Scott Rogers; Dave Ralston
- Programmers: Yoshi Hatano; Keith Weatherly; Narayanan Vaidyanathan; Tetsuya Sakashita
- Artists: Jonathan Casco; Joe Pearson
- Writer: Beau Smith
- Composers: Tommy Tallarico; Cris Leisch; Sam Hulick; Shane Keip; Rob King; Michael Richard Plowman
- Series: Ghosts 'n Goblins
- Platform: PlayStation 2
- Release: JP: September 18, 2003; NA: January 20, 2004; PAL: February 13, 2004
- Genre: Action-adventure
- Mode: Single-player

Maximo vs. Army of Zin (Note: Japanese: 魔界英雄記 マキシモ ～マシンモンスターの野望, Hepburn: Makai Eiyūki Makishimo: Mashin Monsutā no Yabō; lit. Records of the Demon World Hero Maximo: Ambition of the Machine Monsters) is an action-adventure game developed and published by Capcom and developed by their US-based Production Studio 8 in 2003 for the PlayStation 2 video game console. It is a sequel to Maximo: Ghosts to Glory and part of the Ghosts 'n Goblins franchise. It was re-released on the PlayStation Network for the PlayStation 3 in Europe on February 15, 2012.

== Plot ==
The story of the game follows on from Maximo: Ghosts to Glory, with Maximo still searching for his lost love, Sophia. He is again accompanied by Grim (a Grim Reaper). However, their search is interrupted as a series of mechanical creatures start to attack villages and slaughter the village folk. These creatures are the Army of Zin, an ancient army powered by lost souls, who were supposedly locked in the vault of Castle Hawkmoor after the last battle with them 500 years ago. However, they are now free, due to the actions of the mysterious warlord, Lord Bane.

== Gameplay ==
Maximo's gameplay is characterized by hack and slash combat and platforming, as well as an armour system where damage is reflected by loss of armour. Maximo begins the game with two levels of armour (full armour sans helmet), and can upgrade to three and four (with helmet and golden armour, respectively). Level one has Maximo reduced to boxer shorts.

Another element of gameplay is the Grim transformation, allowing the player to turn into a Grim Reaper for short periods of time, with the souls gathered from the Army of Zin. Grim is invulnerable, powerful, and a touch faster than Maximo. However, the time spent in this form is limited but can be extended through upgrades.

Maximo also receives bonuses from villagers that he saves from enemies in the game, and these rewards are anything from new armour to a word of advice.

== Reception ==
Reception

Aggregate score
Aggregator	Score
Metacritic	83/100

Review scores
Publication	Score
Edge	8/10
Electronic Gaming Monthly	6.33/10
Eurogamer	8/10
Game Informer	8.25/10
GamePro	4.5/5
GameRevolution	B
GameSpot	8.4/10
GameSpy	4/5
GameZone	8.7/10
IGN	8.8/10
Official U.S. PlayStation Magazine	4/5
The Times	4/5
The Village Voice	8/10

The game received "favorable" reviews according to video game review aggregator Metacritic. GameSpot named Maximo the best PlayStation 2 game of January 2004.

The Times gave it a score of four stars out of five, saying that it "has pace, style and replayability; and if it is not quite as inventive as Ratchet & Clank, what is?" The Village Voice similarly gave it a score of eight out of ten, saying, "It always helps to have a sense of humor when collapsing paradoxes, and this Maximo does not miss." Likewise, Maxim gave it eight out of ten, saying, "It ain't groundbreaking, but who cares? Drop trou and have some fun!"
