= Demon's Crest =

1994 video game

- North American box art
- Developer: Capcom
- Publisher: Capcom
- Director: Ryo Miyazaki
- Producer: Tokuro Fujiwara
- Designer: Kenichi Iwao
- Composer: Toshihiko Horiyama
- Series: Ghosts 'n Goblins
- Platform: Super Nintendo Entertainment System
- Release: JP: October 21, 1994; NA: November 1994; PAL: March 1, 1995
- Genre: Platform
- Mode: Single-player

Demon's Crest, known in Japan as Demon's Blazon, (Note: Full title: Demonzu Bureizon Makaimura Monshō-hen (Japanese: デモンズブレイゾン 魔界村 紋章編; lit. Demon's Blazon: Demon World Village Crest Chapter)) is a 1994 platform game developed and published by Capcom for the Super Nintendo Entertainment System. It is the third video game starring Firebrand (an enemy character from the Ghosts 'n Goblins series, known as "Red Arremer" in the Japanese version), following Gargoyle's Quest (1990) and Gargoyle's Quest II (1992).

The game was internally considered a commercial failure. For this reason, Capcom rejected a potential port to the Game Boy Advance by a studio that would later become Renegade Kid.

== Gameplay ==
Gameplay screenshot

The gameplay is a mix of action platforming and mild RPG elements. The stages are divided into six areas and can be played multiple times. The game also has Metroidvania elements, where the player must revisit a level with new Crests to enter areas, items, and boss fights that were previously inaccessible. There is also a map for navigation.

Firebrand's main abilities are his fire breath, claws for clinging onto walls, and wings to hover in the air (though he cannot gain height early in the game). As he collects Crests, Firebrand can transform and gain new powers that are specialized for combat and exploration: Ground Gargoyle, Aerial Gargoyle, Tidal Gargoyle, Legendary Gargoyle, and Ultimate Gargoyle. Other items to collect include extra hit points, flasks and spell vellums for using consumable magic items, and talismans that can improve Firebrand's abilities.

== Plot ==
The story revolves around the Crests, six magical stones which preside over their respective elements (Fire, Earth, Water, Air, Time and Heaven). When all crests are combined, the Crest of Infinity will appear, allowing its holder infinite power and the ability to conquer every realm with it. The demons of the Demon Realm have long fought each other for possession of the Crests, five of which have since fallen into the hands of a red demon named Firebrand. Seeking infinite power, Firebrand challenges a Demon Dragon for the Crest of Heaven and is victorious, though badly wounded. In his weakness, a rival demon named Phalanx ambushes Firebrand and takes all the Crests except the Fire Crest, that shatters into five shards, one of which Firebrand retains.

As the game begins, Phalanx has already started using the Crests to become the ruler of the Demon Realm, while Firebrand is imprisoned in an amphitheater and forced to fight the zombified Demon Dragon, Somulo. After escaping the amphitheater, Firebrand sets out to regain the Crests and get revenge on Phalanx. Along the way, Firebrand is repeatedly challenged by Phalanx' general, Arma, who grudgingly returns most of the Crests to Firebrand out of respect for his power.

Finally, Firebrand challenges Phalanx in his castle within the Demon Realm. Depending on the player's choices, three different endings are possible in this battle. The worst ending involves Firebrand killing Phalanx and leaving the Demon Realm as it falls into complete anarchy, while a more favorable ending involves Phalanx sealing himself inside the Crest of Heaven and Firebrand hiding all the Crests. The third ending concludes with Firebrand slaying Phalanx after he summons the Crest of Infinity to transform into a hideous beast, then tossing the crests off a cliff after deciding that he does not seek conquest.

Completing the game with the third ending gives the player a special password that allows Firebrand to continue with a new transformation, the Ultimate Gargoyle. The player also gains access to the hidden fourth ending, in which Firebrand can challenge a secret boss named Dark Demon. Upon winning this battle, the fourth ending plays, in which Firebrand casts away the Crests out of pride for his own power, then leaves to seek another worthy opponent to fight.

== Release ==
Demon's Crest was released in Japan on October 21, 1994. It was followed by a release in North America in November 1994.

In 2014, Demon's Crest was re-released on Nintendo's Virtual Console. In 2016, it was released for the 3DS Virtual Console. It is available for the Nintendo Switch through the Nintendo Classics service.

== Reception ==
Reception

Aggregate score
Aggregator	Score
GameRankings	87%

Review scores
Publication	Score
Computer and Video Games	53/100
Electronic Gaming Monthly	8/10, 8/10, 9/10, 8/10
Famitsu	7/10, 7/10, 8/10, 6/10
Game Informer	8.5/10
Game Players	89%
GameFan	97/100, 98/100, 97/100
GamesMaster	78%
Hyper	84%
Next Generation	3/5
Nintendo Power	3.675/5
Official Nintendo Magazine	73/100
Super Play	80%
Total!	(UK) 82/100 (DE) 2+
Electronic Games	B+
Super Gamer	79/100
VideoGames	8/10

According to Famitsu, Demon's Crest sold 24,427 copies in its first week on the market and 26,245 copies during its lifetime in Japan. Nintendo Power reported that the game suffered negative sales in one week, as more people returned it for a refund than purchased it. It was considered a commercial failure internally at Capcom.

Demon's Crest received a 20.4/30 score in a readers' poll conducted by Super Famicom Magazine. The game also received generally favorable reception, holding a rating of 87% based on five reviews according to review aggregator GameRankings. Electronic Gaming Monthly's four editors applauded the beautiful visuals and complex gameplay. GamePro's Captain Squideo praised its macabre graphics and complexity of the gameplay, particularly the use of the acquired abilities, but criticized the repetitive music and lack of variety in enemy attacks. Nintendo Power commended the audiovisual department, controls, and balance. In 1995, Total! ranked the game as number 57 on its list of the top 100 SNES games.

In retrospectives, Demon's Crest has been listed among the best SNES games by IGN, GamesRadar, and Complex.
