= Ghosts 'n Goblins Resurrection =

2021 platform game

- Developer: Capcom
- Publisher: Capcom
- Director: Tokuro Fujiwara
- Producers: Yoshiaki Hirabayashi; Peter Fabiano; Naoki Sone
- Designer: Tokuro Fujiwara
- Programmer: Yasutaka Hori
- Artist: Uichirou Murata
- Composers: Kento Hasegawa; Masato Kouda; Ryuta Hida
- Series: Ghosts 'n Goblins
- Engine: RE Engine
- Platforms: Nintendo Switch; PlayStation 4; Windows; Xbox One
- Release: Nintendo Switch; February 25, 2021; PS4, Windows, Xbox One; June 1, 2021
- Genres: Platform; Run and gun
- Modes: Single-player, multiplayer

Ghosts 'n Goblins Resurrection (Note: Also known as Demon World Village is Back (Japanese: 帰ってきた 魔界村, Hepburn: Kaettekita Makaimura) in Japan) is a platform game and Run and gun game developed and published by Capcom for the Nintendo Switch. It is the 8th game in the Ghosts 'n Goblins series and was released on February 25, 2021 to celebrate the series' 35th anniversary. Ports for PlayStation 4, Windows, and Xbox One were released on June 1, 2021. The game received mixed reviews upon release.

== Gameplay ==
Gameplay screenshot, showing the player character fighting against the Shielder, the second boss

Ghosts 'n Goblins Resurrection is a 2D side-scrolling platform game. The game once again features knight Arthur, who must navigate the Demon Realm and battle enemies such as zombies, skeleton murderers, demons, and Pigmen to rescue Princess Prin-Prin (credited as "the Princess") from demon lord Astaroth. Once the player defeats Astaroth and his superior, Lucifer, and finishes the game on any difficulty level except Page, they can complete the Shadow versions of each stage. These rearrange the placement and spawn points of enemies and introduce additional environmental challenges as well as one more final boss fight with Hades, the supreme ruler of the Demon Realm.

The player can fight with eight different weapons, including Arthur's iconic lance, which he can throw, and a hammer that induces a shockwave when it strikes the ground. As the player progresses, they will collect umbral bees that unlock and upgrade Arthur's magical and combat skills through a tech tree. Depending on the difficulty level, Arthur may lose his armor in pieces or all at once as he takes hits from enemies.

The game features four difficulty levels: Legend, the most difficult; Knight, the second-most difficult; Squire, the second-easiest difficulty; and Page, the easiest difficulty. If the player dies, they will respawn at a checkpoint (or on the spot on Page). Difficulty in a playthrough cannot be changed permanently, but players will be given an option to lower the difficulty for the remaining part of the level after several consecutive deaths. The game also features a local two-player cooperative multiplayer mode. The second player can play as one of three ancestral spirits: Barry, Kerry, or Archie (known collectively as the "Three Wise Guys"), each of whom has their own abilities that can assist Arthur in his quest.

== Development and release ==
Ghosts 'n Goblins: Resurrection was released to celebrate the franchise's 35th anniversary. A resurgence of players' interest in games featuring gameplay similar to that of Ghosts 'n Goblins also motivated Capcom to greenlight the game. The game was designed and directed by Ghosts 'n Goblins series creator Tokuro Fujiwara. The game adopted a new visual style, built on Capcom's proprietary RE Engine, which was initially met with a mixed reaction from fans. Fujiwara explained that the team adopted an "animated scroll" or a "picture book" art style because they felt that it aligned better with the aesthetics of the stages which were inspired by horror theme parks. Regarding the game's difficulty, Fujiwara added that the game was designed so that player would feel a sense of accomplishment after overcoming all the obstacles in a stage. However, unlike the first game which was known for its difficult gameplay, the team decided early in the game's development that they needed to add multiple difficulty levels to cater to players who are less skilled or experienced.

Ghosts 'n Goblins Resurrection was officially announced at The Game Awards 2020. It was released for the Nintendo Switch on February 25, 2021. Ports for PlayStation 4, Windows, and Xbox One were announced in April 2021 and released on June 1, 2021.

== Reception ==
Reception

Aggregate score
Aggregator	Score
Metacritic	(NS) 74/100 (PC) 69/100 (PS4) 69/100 (XONE) 82/100

Review scores
Publication	Score
Destructoid	7.5/10
Eurogamer	Recommended
Famitsu	31/40
Game Informer	9/10
GameRevolution	7/10
GameSpot	4/10
Hardcore Gamer	4/5
IGN	8/10
Nintendo Life	8/10
Nintendo World Report	6/10
Shacknews	8/10
VG247	4/5

Ghosts 'n Goblins Resurrection received "mixed or average reviews", according to review aggregator site Metacritic.
