= Ghosts 'n Goblins: Gold Knights =

- Developer: Capcom
- Publisher: Capcom
- Series: Ghosts 'n Goblins
- Platform: iOS
- Release: Gold Knights; November 11, 2009; Gold Knights II; August 12, 2010
- Genres: Run and gun, platform
- Mode: Single-player

Ghosts 'n Goblins: Gold Knights and Ghosts 'n Goblins: Gold Knights II, released in Japan as Makaimura Kishi Retsuden (魔界村騎士列伝, lit. Demon World Village: Knight Chronicles) and Makaimura Kishi Retsuden II (魔界村騎士列伝II, lit. Demon World Village: Knight Chronicles II) respectively, are a pair of run and gun platform games developed and published by Capcom for iOS. Both titles were removed from the Apple App Store on May 10, 2016.

They are the first games in the series to offer a choice of playable characters in addition to the series standard, Arthur. Similar to Ultimate Ghosts 'n Goblins they employ 3D graphics, while maintaining much of the 2D gameplay mechanics of the earlier games.

== Plot ==
When demons threaten to plunge the human world in darkness, Princess Prin-Prin summons the knights Sir Arthur and Sir Lancelot to rescue kidnapped maidens and learn the secret of the demons' return. After defeating Astaroth and the demon lord, however, Lancelot is attacked and kidnapped. Sir Perceval saves Arthur from a similar fate, and the two set out to rescue Lancelot. They encounter a mysterious Black Knight who attempts to stop them. After defeating him, they realize that the Black Knight is Lancelot forced to wear demonic armor and that the demon lord has returned and is ready to attack the human realm.

Both games represent a single continuous story, with Gold Knights II beginning directly after the cliffhanger presented in Gold Knights.

== Playable characters ==
- Arthur: Available in both Gold Knights and Gold Knights II. In Gold Knights, Arthur has stronger weapons and armor but a slower attack speed than Lancelot. In Gold Knights II he has a larger selection of weapons than Perceval and can use magic.
- Lancelot: Available in Gold Knights, Lancelot has a higher rate of fire than Arthur at the cost of less power and durability. He uses similar weapons and magic as Arthur in addition to possessing a unique jump attack. Lancelot is kidnapped at the conclusion of Gold Knights but rescued at the end of Gold Knights II.
- Perceval: Available in Gold Knights II, Perceval is a close-range fighter with higher attack power and durability than Arthur. He uses a variety of elemental swords and cannot perform magic, but possess a unique dash attack. He and Arthur rescue Lancelot at the conclusion of Gold Knights.

== Microtransactions ==
For both games, Capcom offered optional additional microtransactions designed to decrease the difficulty of the game. These included such options as to enable unlimited lives, increase the power and durability of weapons and armor, grant new abilities such as a triple jump, or remove traps and simplify stages. Reviews praised this method of optional DLC designed solely to assist the player as opposed to selling additional game content.

== Reception ==
Reception

Review score
Publication	Score
IGN	7.7/10

Reception for both games was mostly positive noting them as "solid action titles" that will "appeal to fans of the old-school Ghosts 'n Goblins games". Reviewers also praised the additional playable character which played differently enough to warrant a second playthrough. However, both games were criticized for somewhat "fuzzy" controls and lack of support for Apple's Retina Display. It was also noted that the traditional high-level of difficulty usually present in the franchise was toned down to accommodate the limitations of mobile gaming.
