= Gargoyle's Quest II =

1992 video game

Gargoyle's Quest II: The Demon Darkness
- North American cover art
- Developer: Capcom
- Publisher: Capcom
- Producer: Tokuro Fujiwara
- Designer: Ryo Miyazaki
- Composer: Yuki Iwai
- Series: Ghosts 'n Goblins
- Platforms: NES, Game Boy
- Release: NES: JP: July 17, 1992; NA: October 1992; EU: June 17, 1993; Game Boy: JP: April 16, 1993
- Genres: Action-adventure, platform
- Mode: Single-player

Gargoyle's Quest II: The Demon Darkness (Note: The full title has always been on the game's main screen. For its original NES release, the box, paperwork, and game label referred to the game simply as Gargoyle's Quest II. It is known in Japan as Red Arremer II (Japanese: レッドアリーマーII, Hepburn: Reddo Arīmā Tsū).) is a 1992 action-adventure platform game developed and published by Capcom for the Nintendo Entertainment System. It is the prequel to Gargoyle's Quest (part of the Ghosts 'n Goblins franchise) and features a similar gameplay style, which combines adventure elements with side-scrolling action in a macabre fantasy setting. It was followed by Demon's Crest for the Super Nintendo Entertainment System in 1994.

== Gameplay ==
The Demon Darkness utilizes a password system and is broken into two sections: Traversing the Ghoul Realm via an overhead map view, and side-scrolling action areas, that take place in dungeons, across giant pits, and more.

The action portions of the gameplay are nearly identical, in a broad sense, to the previous Gargoyle's Quest game. The main difference between these parts and the original Gargoyle's Quest's action platforming segments is the addition of the Magic Tornado power-up, which allows Firebrand, the playable character, to raise himself into the air in vertical directions by standing on temporary platforms. Like in the previous game, Firebrand gets around with the added help of his wings which let him glide horizontally in mid-air. Firebrand can shoot "magic weapon" projectiles as a mean of attack or self-defense at any given moment. One of the staple abilities of Firebrand is his power to cling to walls for climbing up vertical cliffs, grabbing on to the sides of moving objects, and slower descending. Firebrand is notably slower than most video game characters of his kind, often leading to a necessary confrontation with each foe. Occasionally, Firebrand is blocked by foes that have significantly more health than regular ones and must defeat them in confined rooms to advance.

In the overworld and town screens, Firebrand moves in the four cardinal directions to navigate the realm he inhabits in semi-linear paths. Towns contain ghoul denizens, who talk to Firebrand, and various stone buildings that can be entered. Firebrand becomes more powerful as he progresses, whether by increased glide time, higher jumping ability, or more stamina, through the use of acquired enchanted items.

== Plot ==
A long, long time ago before humans started appearing in the place called the Ghoul Realm, there was a young ghoul warrior, a gargoyle (Note: In this case, "ghoul" is an umbrella term for all intelligent life that was native to the realm. All gargoyles are ghouls, but not all ghouls are gargoyles.) named Firebrand from the town of Etruria. One day, while Firebrand was out partaking in his daily routine of training in a small, alternate dimension, The Black Light appeared unexpectedly and destroyed his home. When he returns from his training, he was told to hurry to the local King by another ghoul just before it collapsed and died before him.

Firebrand then made his way there. After defeating Nagus (the spaulder-wearing monster as seen in the distance on the European box art), Firebrand was able to meet with King Morock, who informed Firebrand that he himself was on the brink of death. Before dying, he gave Firebrand the Spectre's Fingernail and set him off on a journey to unravel the mystery of The Black Light, facing off against an invading army the whole way.

== Re-releases ==
Gargoyle's Quest II was ported to the Game Boy in 1993 in Japan and China only, under the name Makaimura Gaiden: The Demon Darkness (魔界村外伝 The Demon Darkness). This port was an enhanced version of the original NES version, containing two new action stages (a cave in the northern part of Sittem Desert and another cave in the desert where Dagon dwells). Completing these levels unlocks abilities unique to this port of the game: a homing upgrade for Firebrand's basic attack as well as an astral projection technique that can be used to briefly scout out the area around Firebrand. It was scheduled to be released in North America in July 1993, but was later canceled.

The NES version was re-released in Japan on March 5 and May 21, 2014 on the Virtual Console for the Nintendo 3DS and Wii U, respectively, and in North America on October 30, 2014 on both the 3DS and Wii U, and Europe on September 4, 2014 on the Wii U and October 30, 2014 on the 3DS. All Virtual Console versions of the game have an ESRB rating of "E" for "Everyone" in North America, unlike all previous versions, which were unrated.

== Reception ==
Reception

Review scores
| Publication | Score |
|---|---|
| Electronic Gaming Monthly | NES: 7/10, 8/10, 7/10, 7/10 |
| Famitsu | NES: 25/40; GB: 22/40 |
| GamePro | 16/20 |
| Nintendo Life | 8/10 |
| Total! | 82% |
| VideoGames & Computer Entertainment | 7/10 |

The three reviewers of the Japanese magazine Famicom Hisshoubon gave the game high rankings and commented on the high level of difficulty. One reviewer commented that it should have not included a level selection option to make it even more challenging.

Reviewers George and Rob of Nintendo Power complimented the game, with George saying it contained the originality of the earlier Game Boy title while Rob added that it may be too challenging for some players.

Tim Latshaw of Nintendo Life called Gargoyle's Quest II: The Demon Darkness "a fine little gem from back in the day that deserves all the appreciation of players who are up to its tough but not impossible style of gameplay." He deeply welcomed the virtual console's "restore point" save function as an addition to the archaic password system, going as far as to imply either of these ports were the superior ways to play the NES version of the game.

IGN put the NES version at number 63 on their list of the best North American NES games ever created.
