= Capcom's Gold Medal Challenge '92 =

1992 video game

- Developer: Capcom
- Publisher: Capcom
- Designers: Yoshinori Takenaka; Keiji Inafune
- Programmer: Tadashi Kuwana
- Artists: Hayato Kaji; Naoya Tomita
- Composer: Sachiko Oita
- Platform: Nintendo Entertainment System
- Release: JP: 5 June 1992; NA: August 1992; EU: 17 June 1993
- Genre: Sports
- Modes: Single-player, multiplayer

Capcom's Gold Medal Challenge '92, known in Japan as Capcom Barcelona '92 (CAPCOM バルセロナ'92), is a 1992 video game by Capcom. It was an Olympic sports game loosely based on the 1992 Summer Olympics in Barcelona. It heavily relied on button mashing style games. This game is also notable for its capability to have 8 human competitors to compete in the Olympiad concurrently against each other (although only two at a time).

== Gameplay ==
The player can choose any of the 12 countries which includes:

- United States of America
- China
- Great Britain
- Germany
- Bulgaria
- Spain
- Commonwealth of Independent States
- Canada
- France
- Romania
- Hungary
- Japan

The object of the game is to win the best scores in the following events.

Games	Group
100 M Dash; 200 M Dash; 400 M Dash; 4 x 100 M Relay; Long jump; Triple jump; High jump; Shot put; Javelin throw; 110 M Hurdles	Track & Field
100 m Backstroke; 100 m Breaststroke; 100 m Butterfly; 100 m Freestyle; 200 m Individual medley	Swimming
Vault	Gymnastics
Weightlifting; Marathon	Miscellaneous

== Reception ==
Reception

Review score
Publication	Score
AllGame	4.5/5

Allgame editor Skyler Miller described the game as an "overlooked gem (that) is definitely worth seeking out" and that the game "does an excellent job of recreating the total experience of Olympic competition".
