= Gargoyle's Quest =

1990 video game

- North American box art
- Developer: Capcom
- Publishers: JP/NA: Capcom; EU: Nintendo
- Producer: Tokuro Fujiwara
- Designer: Kenshi Naruse
- Composers: Harumi Fujita; Yoko Shimomura
- Series: Ghosts 'n Goblins
- Platform: Game Boy
- Release: JP: May 2, 1990; NA: July 1990; EU: 1991
- Genre: Platformer
- Mode: Single-player

Gargoyle's Quest (Note: Fully titled Gargoyle's Quest: Ghosts 'n Goblins on the game's title screen. Known in Japan as Red Arremer: Makaimura Gaiden (レッドアリーマー 魔界村外伝, Reddo Arīmā Makaimura Gaiden; lit. Red Arremer: Demon World Village Side-Story)) is a 1990 platform game developed and published by Capcom for the Game Boy. It is a spin-off of the Ghosts 'n Goblins series, featuring the series antagonist character Firebrand as the main playable character. Gargoyle's Quest was followed by the NES prequel Gargoyle's Quest II in 1992 and the Super NES sequel Demon's Crest in 1994.

Gargoyle's Quest was released on the Nintendo 3DS Virtual Console in 2011. It was released for the Nintendo Classics service in February 2023.

== Gameplay ==
Gameplay screenshot

The game consists of two gameplay styles. One half has the player traverse an overhead view, either on the world map or in towns. This is broken up by the other type of content: individual, action-platforming levels that sometimes feature a boss at the end. While traversing in the sections with an overhead view, the player is able to talk with residential ghouls and, if outside a town, is susceptible to random battle encounters. The player then must defeat the enemies in order to return to the overhead-view map. While on the overhead map, the player occasionally comes across ghouls who want to fight Firebrand for various reasons.

Firebrand can walk, jump (progressively higher with time), cling to walls using his claws, hover for a period (progressively longer with time), and fire offensive projectiles. The player starts with a weak projectile, but progressively gains new projectiles which grant more power and special abilities. Firebrand starts with two hit points, but gains more throughout the game based on items or blessings obtained; various enemies and objects drain different amounts of his health, represented by the hit points.

Throughout the game, the player gains various items including passive ones that increase Firebrand's abilities outright. Eventually, Firebrand acquires an item that allows the player to hover without ever needing to rest on the ground. A healing vial can be used to restore health. Additionally, the offensive projectiles that are learned over time each have unique traits or specialized uses. The Blockbuster, for example, is more powerful than its predecessor and can destroy special walls blocking the player's path. Another projectile temporarily covers sharp vertical surfaces allowing Firebrand to reach higher locations. These abilities guarantee a use for such projectiles even after more powerful projectiles are obtained, and provide a depth of valid options for attacking foes. Projectiles can be selected from a drop-down, pause menu at any time, same as healing vials.

== Plot ==
According to the fictional game lore, Firebrand is a gargoyle predestined to carry on the namesake and identity of the Red Blaze – the powerful force that fought back the Destroyers long before this game takes place. As his destiny foretold, Firebrand saves the Ghoul Realm from brutal conquest by traversing the Ghoul Realm, building his powers, and preparing to fight against the Destroyers' king, Breager, so as to ensure the protection of the Ghoul Realm once more.

== Development ==
Gargoyle's Quest was developed as a spin-off to the Ghosts 'n Goblins series to feature an enemy demon character from the series called Firebrand (known as Red Arremer in Japan). The character was popular with players, so Capcom decided it would be interesting and unique to make a game where players could control a demon and learn his wide moveset. The team decided to develop for the Game Boy, so as not to overshadow the Ghosts 'n Goblins series in arcades and on home consoles.

== Release and reception ==
Reception

Review scores
Publication	Score
AllGame	4/5
Famitsu	6/10, 7/10, 7/10, 5/10
Nintendo Life	9/10
Player One	92%
Total!	76%

Gargoyle's Quest was released in Japan on May 2, 1990 for the Game Boy.

From contemporary reviews, GamePro magazine predicted Gargoyle's Quest to be a system seller for the Game Boy, and called it an instant hit, as well as "original." They ended their review praising the game for its diversity of play and locales, and for its "detailed graphics and great music". Contemporary critics found the 360-degree scrolling camera to be novel and impressive for a Game Boy game. The Japanese gaming publication Famitsu gave the game a 25 out of 40 score.

From retrospective reviews, Nintendo Life editor Kaes Delgrego, who gave a higher score, stated the game to be "[B]eautiful in its simplicity, satisfying in its depth [...], Gargoyle's Quest is almost a painful reminder of how good games used to be, and is a solid indication of [how much potential] the Game Boy had". He also found the music and art do an impressive job at vividly conveying the drab, macabre world, especially given that the game came out close to the start of the Game Boy's lifespan. Brett Alan Weiss of Allgame gave the game four out of five stars, concluding that "Nice graphics and sounds, solid controls, and several new abilities (including flying and climbing) round out this ghoulishly entertaining, though undeniably challenging experience." Nintendo Power commented on the Game Boy game reviewing the NES version of Gargoyle's Quest II in 1992, with the review stating that "the first Gargoyle's Quest as one of the most original and challenging games" the reviewer had seen for the Game Boy. Game Informer's Ben Reeves called it the 18th best Game Boy game, noting that "The side-scrolling action levels posed a nice challenge, but the game’s mild RPG elements really helped set this game apart." In 2019, PC Magazine included Gargoyle's Quest in their "The 10 Best Game Boy Games".
