= F-1 Dream =

1988 Video game

- PC Engine box art
- Developer: Capcom
- Publishers: Capcom (AC, JP); Romstar (AC, US); NEC Avenue (PCE)
- Composer: Manami Matsumae
- Platforms: Arcade; PC Engine
- Release: Arcade: WW: 1988; PC Engine: JP: August 25, 1989
- Genre: Formula One racing
- Mode: Single-player

F-1 Dream (Japanese: F1ドリーム) is an automobile racing arcade game released by Capcom in 1988. Like many other Capcom arcade games at the time, it was released in the US by Romstar. It also had a PC Engine port released exclusively in Japan on August 25, 1989.

== Gameplay ==
Players start off in Formula 3000 (F3000) needing enough points (12) to progress to Formula One (F1) using either a non-turbo or turbo powered car. Although both had the same amount of horsepower, the turbo car is 20 km/h faster in both categories. Turbo F3000 cars started at 300 km/h top speed while F1 cars started at 400. Horsepower improvements for finishing a race 4th or better would see F3000 get up to a maximum speed of 360 and 460 in F1.

A choice of 4 circuits were available for both F3000 and F1 varying in difficulty and the player drives against seven other main cars in both categories. For the first race in each category, the player is given a one-lap qualifying run in either wet or dry conditions to determine their starting position. From then on the starting position is where the driver finished in the previous race. Races are then held over 2 laps (F3000) and 3 laps (F1) with pitstops optional for fuel and tyres and the player has the choice of turbo or non-turbo for each race which is also randomly wet or dry. To continue on to the next race, a player must finish in the top 6 (points were scored the same as Formula One at the time with 9 for 1st, 6 for 2nd, 4 for 3rd, 3 for 4th, 2 for 5th and 1 for 6th). During a race, the player has to avoid hazards including spectators running across the track or other cars (including extra back markers). Hitting either will cause the players car to spin. The player also needs to keep their car on the road as driving off the track will cause the car to slow dramatically. Wet tracks will cause the cars to slide wide when turning.

The game ends if the player finishes a race in 7th or 8th, their car runs out of fuel or is too damaged to continue.

== Reception ==
In Japan, Game Machine listed F-1 Dream on their June 1, 1988 issue as being the fourth most-successful table arcade unit of the month. It ranked 16th in Game Machine's Best Hit Games 25 and had a 5.13 rating.
