= Ghouls 'n Ghosts =

1988 video game

- Arcade flyer
- Developer: Capcom (Note: Mega Drive/Genesis version developed by Sega and Arc System Works; Master System version developed by Sega; Amiga, Amstrad CPC, Atari ST, Commodore 64 and ZX Spectrum versions developed by Software Creations; PC Engine SuperGrafx version developed by NEC Avenue.)
- Publisher: Capcom: Mega Drive/Genesis, Master System Sega Amiga, Atari ST, C64, CPC, ZX Spectrum U.S. Gold SuperGrafx NEC Avenue
- Designers: Tokuro Fujiwara; Shinichi Yoshimoto; Hisashi Yamamoto
- Programmers: Hiroshi Koike; Masatsugu Shinohara; Shinichi Ueyama
- Composers: Tamayo Kawamoto; Amiga, Atari ST, C64, CPC, ZX Spectrum; Tim Follin
- Series: Ghosts 'n Goblins
- Platform: Arcade: Mega Drive/Genesis, Amiga, Amstrad CPC, Atari ST, Commodore 64, ZX Spectrum, PC Engine SuperGrafx, Master System, X68000, iOS, Android
- Release: December 1988: Arcade; WW: December 1988 Mega Drive/Genesis; JP: August 3, 1989; NA: October 1989; EU: November 1990 Amiga, Atari ST, C64, CPC, ZX Spectrum; EU: 1989 SuperGrafx; JP: July 27, 1990 Master System; NA: January 1991; EU: April 1991 X68000; JP: 1994
- Genre: Platform
- Modes: Single-player, multiplayer
- Arcade system: CP System

Ghouls 'n Ghosts, known as Dai Makaimura (Note: Japanese: 大魔界村, Hepburn: Dai Makaimura; lit. "Great Demon World Village") in Japan, is a 1988 platform game developed and published by Capcom for arcades. It is the sequel to 1985's Ghosts 'n Goblins, and the second game in the Ghosts 'n Goblins series.

It was a commercial success, becoming the eighth highest-grossing arcade game of 1989 in Japan. It was also critically acclaimed, with the Sega Genesis version winning four awards from Electronic Gaming Monthly in 1989, including Best Game of the Year.

== Plot ==
Three years after the events of Ghosts 'n Goblins, the kingdom is attacked by ghosts and ghouls, and the souls of its inhabitants are taken. Princess Prin-Prin is among those affected. Sir Arthur sets out to defeat Lucifer and his demons and restore the stolen souls.

== Gameplay ==
Arcade version screenshot

The gameplay for Ghouls 'n Ghosts is similar to that of Ghosts 'n Goblins. The player controls the knight Arthur who must advance through a series of eerie levels and defeat a number of undead and demonic creatures in his quest to restore all the people killed by Lucifer (Loki in the English-language Sega Genesis and Master System versions), including his beloved Princess Prin-Prin, back to life. Along the way, Arthur can pick up a variety of weapons and armor to help him in his quest. While the core gameplay remains the same as its predecessor, the game now allows Arthur to fire directly upward and directly downward while in mid-air.

By jumping in certain spots, players can cause a treasure chest to erupt from the ground. By firing his weapon at the chest, players may uncover new weapons, gold armor or an evil magician that changes Arthur into an elderly man or a helpless duck. The gold armor allows players to charge up the weapon to release a powerful magical attack. Each weapon has its own special attack, with the exception of the special weapon (see below).

There are six levels. To defeat the game, Arthur must complete levels 1 through 5 twice. Upon completing them the first time, Arthur is taken back to level 1, but this time, a special weapon appears during the game. To enter Lucifer's chamber, the player must have this special weapon equipped, and must have defeated Beelzebub. After entering the final large door, the player goes directly to Lucifer's chamber.

== Music ==
The original soundtrack for the arcade version was composed by Tamayo Kawamoto. Many computer ports of the game include the soundtrack by Tim Follin which consists of arrangements and some new songs. Follin's soundtrack – especially Commodore 64, Atari ST (which both implement each machines' 'chiptune' synthesizers, although the selection of pieces and some scoring differs slightly between computers) and Amiga versions (of which the playlist is again slightly different) – is respected among computer game music listeners and also gained appreciation from reviewers when the game was published.

== Versions ==
Versions of Ghouls 'n Ghosts were released in Europe in 1989 for the Amstrad CPC, Amiga, Atari ST, Commodore 64, and ZX Spectrum. These versions were all handled by Software Creations and all omit a great deal of detail from the arcade version.

A Sega Genesis conversion of Ghouls 'n Ghosts (programmed by Yuji Naka) was released by Sega in 1989 in Japan and North America, and in 1990 in Europe. This version was re-released as a handheld TV game with Street Fighter II: Special Champion Edition in 2005 and as a downloadable Virtual Console game for the Wii in 2007. This version was also included on the Sega Genesis Mini in 2019, and on the Nintendo Classics service in 2023. Sega also released a Master System conversion in 1991. This version introduced a power-up system that allows the player to enter secret shops and upgrade parts of their armor. This includes helmets, which give the player access to new weapons and magic spells; chest armor, which allows the player to sustain more damage; and boots, which increase the player's speed.

A SuperGrafx conversion was released by NEC Avenue in 1990. This version was included on the TurboGrafx-16 Mini in 2020. A version for the X68000 was released by Capcom in 1994.

A version for the Capcom Power System Changer was planned and previewed but never released.

In 1998, Capcom released Capcom Generation 2 for the PlayStation and Saturn in Japan, a compilation which included Ghouls 'n Ghosts along with Ghosts 'n Goblins and Super Ghouls 'n Ghosts. The PlayStation version of this compilation was released as a bundle in Europe with three other volumes titled Capcom Generations (in plural) under the title of Capcom Generations: Chronicles of Arthur. Capcom later released in North America Capcom Classics Collection Vol. 1 for the PlayStation 2 and Xbox in 2005 and Capcom Classics Collection: Reloaded for the PlayStation Portable in 2006, which includes all the Capcom Generations titles. The arcade version of Ghouls 'n Ghosts was re-released as one of the included games on the Capcom Home Arcade console in 2019.

== Reception ==
=== Commercial performance ===
In Japan, Game Machine listed Ghouls 'n Ghosts as the second most successful table arcade unit of January 1989, outperforming titles like Image Fight and Truxton. It went on to become the eighth highest-grossing arcade game of 1989 in Japan.

=== Contemporary reviews ===
Contemporary reception

Review scores
Publication	Score							
Publication	Amiga	Arcade	Atari ST	C64	Master System	PC	Sega Genesis	ZX
ACE		Positive	905/1000				895/1000	
Amiga Format	91%							
Crash		Positive						92%
Computer and Video Games		Positive	88%			85% (CPC)	96%	85%
Electronic Gaming Monthly					7/10, 8/10, 8/10, 7/10		36/40	
Mean Machines					80%		92%	
Raze							93%	
Sinclair User								82%
The Games Machine (UK)	92%	Positive	90%			79% (CPC)		85%
Your Sinclair		9/10						91%
Zzap!64	85%			96%				
Commodore User	89%	9/10		83%				
Console XS					90%			
Mega Action							90%	
Mega Drive Advanced Gaming							86%	
MegaTech							93%	
Sega Power							92%	
Sega Pro							93%	

Awards
Publication	Award
Electronic Gaming Monthly	Best Game of the Year, Best Graphics, Best Sequel, Coolest Boss
Computer Entertainer Awards	Genesis Game of the Year
VideoGames & Computer Entertainment	Best Coin-Op Conversion
Crash	Smash

MegaTech magazine reviewed the Sega Mega Drive version, calling it "a truly superb game" and "a stunning conversion" of the "classic coin-op, combining stunning graphics and sound with very challenging gameplay."

=== Accolades ===
The Sega Genesis version received the 1989 Electronic Gaming Monthly awards for Best Game of the Year, Best Graphics, Best Sequel and Coolest Boss. The Computer Entertainer Awards selected it as the Genesis Game of the Year. VideoGames & Computer Entertainment gave it the award for the best coin-op conversion on consoles. The Computer Entertainer Awards selected it as the Genesis Game of the Year.

ACE magazine listed it as one of the top four best games available for the Mega Drive in 1989. It received a Hyper Game award from MegaTech, as well as a Gold Medal from Zzap!64, Crash Smash award from Crash, and C+VG Hit award from Computer and Video Games.

In 1992, Mega magazine ranked it as the 23rd best game of all time. In 1997, Electronic Gaming Monthly ranked the Genesis version as the 48th best console video game of all time, citing its close recreation of the arcade version. In 2017, Gamesradar listed the game 44th on its "Best Sega Genesis/Mega Drive games of all time."

=== Retrospective ===
Retrospectively, Game Rankings gave the Sega Genesis version an aggregate rating of 80% based on four reviews published online in the 2000s, including three reviews for the Wii Virtual Console release.

The Virtual Console release (ported from the Sega Genesis) was rated 6.5 out of 10 by GameSpot, 7.5 out of 10 by IGN, and 9 out of 10 stars by Nintendo Life.
