= Ultimate Ghosts 'n Goblins =

2006 video game

- North American cover art
- Developer: Tose
- Publisher: Capcom
- Director: Tokuro Fujiwara
- Producer: Hironobu Takeshita
- Programmer: Takafumi Goto
- Artists: Shin Yusa; Makiko Nihari
- Composers: Masaya Tsunemoto; Kazuhiro Kotani
- Series: Ghosts 'n Goblins
- Platform: PlayStation Portable
- Release: JP: August 3, 2006; NA: August 29, 2006; EU: September 8, 2006; AU: September 14, 2006
- Genres: Hack and slash, platform, run and gun
- Mode: Single-player

Ultimate Ghosts 'n Goblins (Note: Japanese: 極魔界村, Hepburn: Gokumakaimura; lit. Extreme Demon World Village) is a video game in Capcom's Ghosts 'n Goblins series, developed by Tose and published by Capcom. It was released for the PlayStation Portable on August 3, 2006, in Japan and August 29, 2006, in North America. Ultimate Ghosts 'n Goblins is the first game in the main series to employ 3D graphics, while maintaining much of the 2D gameplay mechanics of the earlier games. It also marks the return of the series' project head, Tokuro Fujiwara.

The game follows the classic scenario of the heroic knight Arthur battling with demons but includes a large number of changes.

== Gameplay ==
There are three specific game modes available from the start:

- Novice Mode
- Standard Mode
- Ultimate Mode

The main game mode, Standard Mode, is a departure for the series. Arthur starts with five lives and when a player loses one of these lives, Arthur is resurrected on the spot. Arthur's armor can now resist more than one hit when it is powered up. When he eventually loses his armor and is down to his boxer shorts, he can only sustain one more hit.

Ultimate Mode plays similarly to older Ghosts 'n Goblins titles. In this mode, Arthur can only take one hit before losing his armor, no matter what kind he is wearing. Once he dies, he is sent back to the start of the stage rather than being resurrected. This mode is for traditionalists and expert players.

Novice Mode is an easier version of Standard Mode. Certain environmental obstacles are excluded from this mode, such as the tornadoes in the Death Castle. In addition, upon death and respawn, Arthur is given the POW power-up, which lasts until Arthur gets hit by an enemy.

The levels are varied, ranging from being inside a more traditional haunted forest to volcanic pits and ruined castles. Enemies are varied and tend to be thrown at Arthur in groups, and range from zombies, ghosts, giant oxen, Venus flytraps and string dragons. There is an assortment of boss characters, some of which are quite large (two of which take up the entire screen).

The game has many weapons from the past games, with a few new additions; this installment also has a new equip system. Arthur is now able to gather items that can be stored and used for different levels, ranging from what type of power Arthur can use (as a secondary attack) to standard equipment (shields, double-jump boots etc.). Arthur can also collect different types of armor, which give him varied abilities, too.

The magic system is no longer tethered to the armor and weapon combination; instead, "POW" pick-ups increase weapon power, and armor amplifies the magic spell Arthur has equipped (which are also gathered throughout the levels as pick-ups, hidden in chests).

Instead of the linearity of the original versions, the game has now been designed so that players have to obtain a selection of Golden Rings hidden throughout the levels to access the last battle and finish the game. Players are given the option to return to earlier levels and search previously unreachable areas to find these by the use of power-ups found later on in the game. The game is designed in such a way that it is impossible to gather all the important rings and abilities in a single run, without having to return to every stage of the game at least once; this follows the series' tradition of having to beat the game twice to reach the final boss.

== Release ==
On August 2, 2007, the game was re-released in Japan under the name Gokumakaimura Kai (極魔界村 改), which translates roughly as "Extreme Demon World Village Revised." This re-release contains the original game plus a redesigned version on the same disc. The redesigned version was made to fix balance issues in the original game and to adjust the gameplay to more closely resemble the arcade style of the previous entries of the series. Notable changes are re-mixed enemy locations and types, a re-worked magic system, and limited continues. The difficulty setting determines the number of lives and continues, and is referred to as "lifestock". The flow of the game was also altered to remove the RPG aspects of the original game, such as the inventory and fetch quests. Following the series' tradition, Arthur must complete all stages twice in a fixed order in order to face the final boss and complete the game. Furthermore, armor hit points have been totally removed in favor of the Ultimate Mode setting where one hit knocks off Arthur's armor. Re-spawn checkpoints now are located only at the start and half-way points of levels.

== Reception ==
Reception

Aggregate score
Aggregator	Score
Metacritic	72/100

Review scores
Publication	Score
1Up.com	C-
Eurogamer	7/10
G4	3/5
GamePro	16/20
GameRevolution	3/10
GameSpot	6.7/10
GameSpy	3.5/5
GamesRadar+	3.5/5
GameTrailers	7.7/10
GameZone	8.9/10
Hardcore Gamer	4.25/5
IGN	8.6/10
PALGN	6.5/10
Pocket Gamer	8/10
VideoGamer.com	7/10
Play	9.5/10
