= List of Capcom games: 0–D =

This is a list of video games by Capcom organized alphabetically by name. The list may also include ports that were developed and published by others companies under license from Capcom.

Title	System	Release date	Developer(s)	Japan	North America	Europe	Australia	Reference (s)
1941: Counter Attack	Arcade	February 1990	Capcom	Yes	Yes	Yes	Yes	
1942	Arcade	December 1984	Capcom	Yes	Yes	Yes	Yes	
1942	Commodore 64		Elite Systems	Yes	Yes	Yes	Yes	
1942	Nintendo Entertainment System	December 11, 1985	Micronics	Yes				
1942	ZX Spectrum		Syrox	Yes	Yes	Yes	Yes	
1942	MSX	1986		Yes	Yes	Yes	Yes	
1942: First Strike	iOS	July 1, 2010	Beeline Interactive Europe Ltd	Yes	Yes	Yes	Yes	
1942: Joint Strike	PlayStation Network	July 24, 2008	Backbone Entertainment	Yes	Yes	Yes	Yes	
1942: Joint Strike	Xbox Live Marketplace	July 23, 2008	Backbone Entertainment	Yes	Yes	Yes	Yes	
1943: The Battle of Midway	Amiga		Probe Entertainment	Yes	Yes	Yes	Yes	
1943: The Battle of Midway	Atari ST		Probe Entertainment	Yes	Yes	Yes	Yes	
1943: The Battle of Midway	Arcade	June 1987	Capcom	Yes	Yes	Yes	Yes	
1943: The Battle of Midway	Commodore 64		Tiertex	Yes	Yes	Yes	Yes	
1943: The Battle of Midway	Nintendo Entertainment System		Capcom	Yes	Yes	Yes	Yes	
1943: The Battle of Midway	ZX Spectrum		Tiertex	Yes	Yes	Yes	Yes	
1944: The Loop Master	Arcade	June 20, 2000	Eighting	Yes	Yes			
19XX: The War Against Destiny	Arcade	December 7, 1995	Capcom	Yes	Yes	Yes	Yes	
Ace Attorney Investigations: Miles Edgeworth	Nintendo DS	May 28, 2009	Capcom	Yes	Yes	Yes	Yes	
Adventure Quiz: Capcom World	Arcade	1989	Capcom	Yes				
Adventure Quiz: Capcom World 2	CPS Changer	June 11, 1992	Capcom	Yes				
Adventure Quiz 2: Hatena? no Daibouken	Arcade	February 28, 1990	Capcom	Yes				
Adventures in the Magic Kingdom	Nintendo Entertainment System	July 1990	Capcom		Yes	Yes	Yes	
Age of Booty	PlayStation Network	November 13, 2008	Certain Affinity	Yes	Yes	Yes	Yes	
Age of Booty	Xbox Live Marketplace	October 15, 2008	Certain Affinity	Yes	Yes	Yes	Yes	
Airborne	Pinball	1996	Capcom		Yes	Yes		
Alien vs. Predator	Arcade	May 20, 1994		Yes	Yes	Yes	Yes	
Apollo Justice: Ace Attorney	Nintendo DS	April 12, 2007	Capcom	Yes	Yes	Yes	Yes	
Apollo Justice: Ace Attorney	iOS	December 1, 2016						
Apollo Justice: Ace Attorney	Android	December 8, 2016						
Apollo Justice: Ace Attorney	Nintendo 3DS	November 21, 2017						
Apollo Justice: Ace Attorney	Microsoft Windows	January 25, 2024						
Apollo Justice: Ace Attorney	Nintendo Switch	January 25, 2024						
Apollo Justice: Ace Attorney	PlayStation 4	January 25, 2024						
Apollo Justice: Ace Attorney	Xbox One	January 25, 2024						
Are You Smarter Than a 5th Grader? 2009 Edition	iOS	November 24, 2008	Beeline Interactive, Inc.		Yes	Yes		
Armored Warriors	Arcade	October 1994	Capcom	Yes				
Arthur & Astrot NazoMakaimura: Incredible Toons	PlayStation	August 30, 1996	Magical Formation	Yes				
Arthur & Astrot NazoMakaimura: Incredible Toons	Sega Saturn	August 30, 1996	Magical Formation	Yes				
Ashita no Joe 2: The Anime Super Remix	PlayStation 2	2002	Capcom	Yes				
Asura's Wrath	PlayStation 3	February 21, 2012	CyberConnect2	Yes	Yes	Yes	Yes	
Asura's Wrath	Xbox 360	February 21, 2012	CyberConnect2	Yes	Yes	Yes	Yes	
Ataxx	Arcade	May 1991	Capcom	Yes	Yes	Yes	Yes	
Auto Modellista	GameCube	July 3, 2003	Capcom	Yes	Yes			
Auto Modellista	PlayStation 2	August 22, 2002	Capcom	Yes	Yes	Yes	Yes	
Auto Modellista	Xbox	January 20, 2004	Capcom	Yes	Yes			
Avengers	Arcade	January 1987	Capcom	Yes	Yes	Yes	Yes	
Battle Circuit	Arcade	March 1997	Capcom	Yes	Yes	Yes	Yes	
Beat Down: Fists of Vengeance	PlayStation 2	August 23, 2005	Cavia	Yes	Yes	Yes		
Beat Down: Fists of Vengeance	Xbox	August 23, 2005	Cavia	Yes	Yes	Yes		
Big Bang Bar	Pinball	1996	Capcom		Yes			
Biohazard 7: Resident Evil Cloud Version	Nintendo Switch	May 24, 2018	Capcom	Yes				
Biohazard – Code: Veronica Complete	Dreamcast	March 22, 2001	Capcom	Yes				
Bionic Commando (arcade)	Amiga	March 1987	Software Creations	Yes	Yes			
Bionic Commando (arcade)	Atari ST	March 1987	Software Creations	Yes	Yes			
Bionic Commando (arcade)	Arcade	March 1987	Capcom	Yes	Yes			
Bionic Commando (arcade)	Commodore 64	March 1987	Pacific Dataworks International	Yes	Yes			
Bionic Commando (arcade)	DOS	March 1987	Pacific Dataworks International	Yes	Yes			
Bionic Commando (arcade)	ZX Spectrum	March 1987	Software Creations	Yes	Yes			
Bionic Commando (NES video game)	Nintendo Entertainment System	July 20, 1988	Capcom	Yes	Yes	Yes		
Bionic Commando (Game Boy)	Game Boy	July 24, 1992	Minakuchi Engineering	Yes	Yes	Yes		
Bionic Commando (2009 video game)	PlayStation 3	May 19, 2009	Grin	Yes	Yes	Yes		
Bionic Commando (2009 video game)	Xbox 360	May 19, 2009	Grin	Yes	Yes	Yes		
Bionic Commando (2009 video game)	Microsoft Windows	July 17, 2009	Grin	Yes	Yes	Yes		
Bionic Commando Rearmed	PlayStation Network	August 13, 2008	Grin	Yes	Yes	Yes		
Bionic Commando Rearmed	Xbox Live Marketplace	August 13, 2008	Grin	Yes	Yes	Yes		
Bionic Commando Rearmed	Microsoft Windows	August 14, 2008	Grin	Yes	Yes	Yes		
Bionic Commando Rearmed 2	PlayStation Network	February 1, 2011	Fatshark	Yes	Yes	Yes		
Bionic Commando Rearmed 2	Xbox Live Marketplace	February 2, 2011	Fatshark	Yes	Yes	Yes		
Black Tiger	Amiga	August 1987		Yes	Yes	Yes	Yes	
Black Tiger	Amstrad CPC	August 1987	Tiertex	Yes	Yes	Yes	Yes	
Black Tiger	Atari ST	August 1987		Yes	Yes	Yes	Yes	
Black Tiger	Arcade	August 1987	Capcom	Yes	Yes	Yes	Yes	
Black Tiger	Commodore 64	August 1987		Yes	Yes	Yes	Yes	
Black Tiger	ZX Spectrum	August 1987	Tiertex	Yes	Yes	Yes	Yes	
Block Block	Arcade	September 10, 1991	Capcom	Yes	Yes			
Black Command	iOS and Android	September 26, 2018	Capcom	Yes	Yes	Yes	Yes	
Bombastic	PlayStation 2	August 27, 2003	Shift		Yes	Yes		
BombLink	iOS	October 5, 2009	Capcom	Yes	Yes	Yes	Yes	
Bonkers	Super Nintendo Entertainment System	October 1994	Capcom	Yes	Yes			
Bounty Hunter Sara: Holy Mountain no Teiou	Dreamcast	2001	Flagship	Yes				
Bounty Hunter Sara: Holy Mountain no Teiou	PlayStation	2001	Flagship	Yes				
BreakShot	Pinball	1996	Capcom		Yes	Yes		
Breath of Fire	Super Nintendo Entertainment System	April 3, 1993	Capcom	Yes	Yes	Yes	Yes	
Breath of Fire	Game Boy Advance	July 6, 2001	Capcom	Yes	Yes	Yes		
Breath of Fire	Virtual Console	October 20, 2016	Capcom		Yes			
Breath of Fire II	Super Nintendo Entertainment System	December 2, 1994	Capcom	Yes	Yes	Yes		
Breath of Fire II	Game Boy Advance	December 21, 2001	Capcom	Yes	Yes	Yes		
Breath of Fire III	PlayStation	September 11, 1997	Capcom	Yes	Yes	Yes		
Breath of Fire III	PlayStation Portable	August 3, 2005	Capcom	Yes	Yes	Yes		
Breath of Fire IV	PlayStation	April 27, 2000	Capcom	Yes	Yes	Yes		
Breath of Fire IV	Microsoft Windows	May 30, 2003	Capcom	Yes		Yes		
Breath of Fire 6	Microsoft Windows	February 24, 2016	Capcom	Yes				
Breath of Fire 6	Android	February 24, 2016	Capcom	Yes				
Breath of Fire 6	iOS	July 12, 2016	Capcom	Yes				
Breath of Fire: Dragon Quarter	PlayStation 2	November 14, 2002	Capcom	Yes	Yes	Yes		
Buster Bros.	Arcade	1989	Mitchell		Yes			
Buster Bros.	TurboGrafx-CD	1989	Mitchell		Yes			
Buster Bros. Collection	PlayStation	May 26, 1997	Mitchell		Yes			
Cabal	Commodore 64	1988	TAD Corporation	Yes	Yes	Yes		
Cabal	DOS	1988	TAD Corporation	Yes	Yes	Yes		
Cadillacs and Dinosaurs	Arcade	February 1, 1993	Capcom	Yes	Yes	Yes		
Cannon Spike	Arcade	2000	Psikyo	Yes				
Cannon Spike	Dreamcast	November 14, 2000	Psikyo	Yes	Yes	Yes		
Capcom Arcade 2nd Stadium	PlayStation 4	July 22, 2022	Capcom	Yes	Yes	Yes	Yes	
Capcom Arcade 2nd Stadium	Xbox One	July 22, 2022	Capcom	Yes	Yes	Yes	Yes	
Capcom Arcade 2nd Stadium	Nintendo Switch	July 22, 2022	Capcom	Yes	Yes	Yes	Yes	
Capcom Arcade 2nd Stadium	Microsoft Windows	July 22, 2022	Capcom	Yes	Yes	Yes	Yes	
Capcom Arcade Cabinet	PlayStation 3	February 19, 2013	M2	Yes	Yes	Yes	Yes	
Capcom Arcade Cabinet	Xbox 360	February 19, 2013	M2	Yes	Yes	Yes	Yes	
Capcom Arcade Hits Volume 2	Microsoft Windows	2003	Capcom		Yes	Yes		
Capcom Baseball - Suketto Gaijin Oo-Abare	Arcade	October 1989	Capcom	Yes				
Capcom Beat ‘Em Up Bundle	Nintendo Switch	September 18, 2018	Capcom	Yes	Yes	Yes	Yes	
Capcom Beat ‘Em Up Bundle	PlayStation 4	September 18, 2018	Capcom	Yes	Yes	Yes	Yes	
Capcom Beat ‘Em Up Bundle	Xbox One	September 18, 2018	Capcom	Yes	Yes	Yes	Yes	
Capcom Beat ‘Em Up Bundle	Microsoft Windows	October 10, 2018	Capcom	Yes	Yes	Yes	Yes	
Capcom Bowling	Arcade	August 1988	Capcom		Yes			
Capcom Classics Collection	PlayStation 2	September 27, 2005	Capcom	Yes	Yes			
Capcom Classics Collection	Xbox	September 27, 2005	Capcom		Yes			
Capcom Classics Collection Reloaded	PlayStation Portable	March 22, 2006	Capcom	Yes	Yes			
Capcom Classics Collection Remixed	PlayStation Portable	October 24, 2006	Capcom	Yes				
Capcom Classics Collection Vol. 2	PlayStation 2	November 14, 2006	Capcom		Yes			
Capcom Classics Collection Vol. 2	Xbox	November 14, 2006	Capcom		Yes			
Capcom Classics Mini-Mix	Game Boy Advance	September 27, 2005	Sensory Sweep Studios	Yes	Yes			
Capcom Fighting Evolution	Arcade	October 2004	Capcom	Yes				
Capcom Fighting Evolution	PlayStation 2	November 16, 2004	Capcom	Yes	Yes	Yes		
Capcom Fighting Evolution	Xbox	June 14, 2005	Capcom	Yes	Yes	Yes		
Capcom Fighting Evolution	PlayStation Network	December 19, 2012	Capcom	Yes	Yes			
Capcom Generation 1	Sega Saturn	1998	Capcom	Yes				
Capcom Generation 1	PlayStation	1998	Capcom	Yes		Yes		
Capcom Generation 2	Sega Saturn	1998	Capcom	Yes				
Capcom Generation 2	PlayStation	1998	Capcom	Yes		Yes		
Capcom Generation 3	Sega Saturn	1998	Capcom	Yes				
Capcom Generation 3	PlayStation	1998	Capcom	Yes		Yes		
Capcom Generation 4	Sega Saturn	1998	Capcom	Yes				
Capcom Generation 4	PlayStation	1998	Capcom	Yes		Yes		
Capcom Generation 5	Sega Saturn	1998	Mitchell Corporation	Yes				
Capcom Generation 5	PlayStation	1998	Capcom	Yes	Yes	Yes		
Capcom Golf	Arcade	March 1991	Capcom	Yes	Yes	Yes		
Capcom no Quiz: Tonosama no Yabou	Arcade	January 1991	Capcom	Yes				
Capcom no Quiz: Tonosama no Yabou	Sega Mega-CD	January 1991	Capcom	Yes				
Capcom Puzzle World	PlayStation Portable	February 6, 2007	Sensory Sweep Studios		Yes	Yes	Yes	
Capcom Quiz: Hatena? no Daibouken	Game Boy	December 21, 1990	Capcom	Yes				
Capcom Sports Club	Arcade	1997	Capcom	Yes	Yes	Yes	Yes	
Capcom Taisen Fan Disc	Dreamcast			Yes				
Capcom vs. SNK 2	Arcade	August 1, 2001	Capcom	Yes	Yes			
Capcom vs. SNK 2 EO	GameCube	July 4, 2002	Capcom	Yes	Yes	Yes	Yes	
Capcom vs. SNK 2 EO	Xbox	January 16, 2003	Capcom	Yes	Yes	Yes	Yes	
Capcom vs. SNK 2: Mark of the Millennium	PlayStation 2	September 13, 2001	Capcom	Yes	Yes	Yes	Yes	
Capcom vs. SNK 2: Mark of the Millennium	PlayStation Network	September 19, 2012	Capcom	Yes	Yes	Yes	Yes	
Capcom vs. SNK 2: Millionaire Fighting 2001	Dreamcast	September 13, 2001	Capcom	Yes				
Capcom vs. SNK Pro	PlayStation	April 18, 2002	Capcom	Yes	Yes	Yes		
Capcom vs. SNK: Millennium Fight 2000	Arcade	2000	Capcom	Yes	Yes	Yes		
Capcom vs. SNK: Millennium Fight 2000	Dreamcast	September 6, 2000	Capcom	Yes	Yes	Yes		
Capcom vs. SNK: Millennium Fight 2000 Pro	Dreamcast	June 14, 2001	Capcom	Yes				
Capcom's MVP Football	Super Nintendo Entertainment System	October 1993	Equilibrium		Yes			
Capcom's Soccer Shootout	Super Nintendo Entertainment System	May 1, 1994	A-Max	Yes				
Captain Commando	Arcade	September 28, 1991	Capcom	Yes	Yes	Yes		
Captain Commando	CPS Changer	November 1991	Capcom	Yes	Yes	Yes		
Captain Commando	Super Nintendo Entertainment System	1995	Capcom	Yes	Yes	Yes		
Captain Commando	PlayStation	2006	Capcom	Yes	Yes	Yes		
Captain Commando	Xbox	2006	Capcom	Yes	Yes	Yes		
Captain Commando	PlayStation Portable	2006	Capcom	Yes	Yes	Yes		
Carrier Air Wing	Arcade	October 9, 1990	Capcom	Yes	Yes	Yes	Yes	
Cash Cab	iOS	December 5, 2009	Capcom		Yes	Yes	Yes	
Catan	PlayStation 2	2002	Capcom	Yes	Yes	Yes	Yes	
Chaos Legion	PlayStation 2	March 6, 2003	Capcom	Yes	Yes	Yes		
Chaos Legion	Microsoft Windows	November 14, 2003	Capcom		Yes	Yes		
Cherry Tree High Comedy Club	Microsoft Windows	June 20, 2010	773	Yes	Yes	Yes	Yes	
Chip 'n Dale Rescue Rangers	Nintendo Entertainment System	June 8, 1990	Capcom	Yes	Yes	Yes		
Chip 'n Dale Rescue Rangers 2	Nintendo Entertainment System	December 10, 1993	Make Software	Yes	Yes	Yes		
Choko	Arcade	1986	Solid Image Ltd	Yes	Yes	Yes	Yes	
Clock Tower 3	PlayStation 2	December 12, 2002	Capcom/Sunsoft	Yes	Yes	Yes	Yes	
Code Name: Viper	Nintendo Entertainment System	February 23, 1990	Arc System Works	Yes	Yes	Yes		
Commando	Amiga	May 1985	Elite Systems	Yes	Yes	Yes	Yes	
Commando	Atari ST	May 1985	Elite Systems	Yes	Yes	Yes	Yes	
Commando	Arcade	May 1985	Capcom	Yes	Yes	Yes	Yes	
Commando	Commodore 64	May 1985	Elite Systems	Yes	Yes	Yes	Yes	
Commando	Nintendo Entertainment System	September 27, 1986	Capcom	Yes	Yes	Yes	Yes	
Commando	ZX Spectrum	May 1985	Elite Systems	Yes	Yes	Yes	Yes	
Crimson Tears	PlayStation 2	April 22, 2004	Spike/DreamFactory	Yes	Yes	Yes		
Critical Bullet: 7th Target	PlayStation 2	2002	Flagship	Yes				
Cyberbots: Full Metal Madness	Arcade	April 20, 1995	Capcom	Yes				
Cyberbots: Full Metal Madness	Sega Saturn	March 28, 1997	Capcom	Yes				
Cyberbots: Full Metal Madness	PlayStation	December 25, 1997	Capcom	Yes				
Darkstalkers: The Night Warriors	Arcade	June 30, 1994	Capcom	Yes	Yes	Yes		
Darkstalkers: The Night Warriors	PlayStation	March 22, 1996	Capcom	Yes	Yes	Yes		
Darkstalkers: The Night Warriors	PlayStation 2	May 19, 2005	Capcom	Yes				
Darkstalkers: The Night Warriors	PlayStation Network	November 29, 2011	Capcom		Yes			
Darkstalkers Chronicle: The Chaos Tower	PlayStation Portable	December 12, 2004	Capcom	Yes	Yes	Yes		
Darkstalkers Resurrection	PlayStation Network	March 12, 2013	Iron Galaxy Studios	Yes	Yes	Yes		
Darkstalkers Resurrection	Xbox Live Marketplace	March 13, 2013	Iron Galaxy Studios	Yes	Yes	Yes		
Dark Void	PlayStation 3	January 19, 2010	Airtight Games		Yes	Yes	Yes	
Dark Void	Microsoft Windows	January 19, 2010	Airtight Games		Yes	Yes	Yes	
Dark Void	Xbox 360	January 19, 2010	Airtight Games		Yes	Yes	Yes	
Dark Void Zero	Nintendo DSi	January 18, 2010	Other Ocean Interactive		Yes	Yes		
Dark Void Zero	iOS	April 12, 2010	Other Ocean Interactive		Yes	Yes		
Dark Void Zero	Microsoft Windows	April 12, 2010	Other Ocean Interactive		Yes	Yes		
Darkwatch	PlayStation 2	August 16, 2005	High Moon Studios		Yes	Yes		
Darkwatch	Xbox	August 16, 2005	High Moon Studios		Yes	Yes		
Darkwing Duck	Nintendo Entertainment System	June 1992	Capcom		Yes	Yes		
Darkwing Duck	Game Boy	1993	Capcom		Yes			
Dead Phoenix	GameCube	Cancelled	Capcom					
Dead Rising	Xbox 360	August 8, 2006	Capcom	Yes	Yes	Yes	Yes	
Dead Rising	Xbox One	September 13, 2016	Capcom	Yes	Yes	Yes	Yes	
Dead Rising	Microsoft Windows	September 13, 2016	Capcom	Yes	Yes	Yes	Yes	
Dead Rising	PlayStation 4	September 13, 2016	Capcom	Yes	Yes	Yes	Yes	
Dead Rising 2	PlayStation 3	September 24, 2010	Blue Castle Games	Yes	Yes	Yes	Yes	
Dead Rising 2	Xbox 360	September 24, 2010	Blue Castle Games	Yes	Yes	Yes	Yes	
Dead Rising 2	Microsoft Windows	September 28, 2010	Blue Castle Games	Yes	Yes	Yes	Yes	
Dead Rising 2	PlayStation 4	September 13, 2016	Blue Castle Games	Yes	Yes	Yes	Yes	
Dead Rising 2	Xbox One	September 13, 2016	Blue Castle Games	Yes	Yes	Yes	Yes	
Dead Rising 2: Case West	Xbox Live Marketplace	December 27, 2010	Blue Castle Games	Yes	Yes	Yes	Yes	
Dead Rising 2: Case Zero	Xbox Live Marketplace	August 31, 2010	Blue Castle Games	Yes	Yes	Yes	Yes	
Dead Rising 2: Off the Record	PlayStation 3	October 11, 2011	Capcom Vancouver	Yes	Yes	Yes	Yes	
Dead Rising 2: Off the Record	Microsoft Windows	October 11, 2011	Capcom Vancouver	Yes	Yes	Yes	Yes	
Dead Rising 2: Off the Record	Xbox 360	October 11, 2011	Capcom Vancouver	Yes	Yes	Yes	Yes	
Dead Rising 2: Off the Record	PlayStation 4	September 13, 2016	Capcom Vancouver	Yes	Yes	Yes	Yes	
Dead Rising 2: Off the Record	Xbox One	September 13, 2016	Capcom Vancouver	Yes	Yes	Yes	Yes	
Dead Rising 3	Xbox One	November 22, 2013	Capcom Vancouver	Yes	Yes	Yes	Yes	
Dead Rising 3	Microsoft Windows	September 5, 2014	Capcom Vancouver	Yes	Yes	Yes	Yes	
Dead Rising 4	Microsoft Windows	December 6, 2016	Capcom Vancouver	Yes	Yes	Yes	Yes	
Dead Rising 4	Xbox One	December 6, 2016	Capcom Vancouver	Yes	Yes	Yes	Yes	
Dead Rising 4: Frank's Big Package	PlayStation 4	December 5, 2017	Capcom Vancouver	Yes	Yes	Yes	Yes	
Dead Rising: Chop Till You Drop	Wii	February 19, 2009	Tose	Yes	Yes	Yes	Yes	
Deep Down	PlayStation 4	Cancelled	Capcom					
Demon's Crest	Super Nintendo Entertainment System	October 21, 1994	Capcom	Yes	Yes	Yes	Yes	
Desperado	Amstrad CPC	November 1985	Capcom	Yes	Yes	Yes	Yes	
Destiny of an Emperor	Nintendo Entertainment System	May 19, 1989	Capcom	Yes	Yes			
Destiny of an Emperor II	Nintendo Entertainment System	April 5, 1991	Capcom	Yes				
Devil May Cry	PlayStation 2	August 23, 2001	Capcom	Yes	Yes	Yes	Yes	
Devil May Cry	PlayStation 2	March 22, 2012	Capcom	Yes	Yes	Yes	Yes	
Devil May Cry	Xbox 360	March 22, 2012	Capcom	Yes	Yes	Yes	Yes	
Devil May Cry	Microsoft Windows	March 13, 2018	Capcom	Yes	Yes	Yes	Yes	
Devil May Cry	PlayStation 4	March 13, 2018	Capcom	Yes	Yes	Yes	Yes	
Devil May Cry	Xbox One	March 13, 2018	Capcom	Yes	Yes	Yes	Yes	
Devil May Cry	Nintendo Switch	June 25, 2019	Capcom	Yes	Yes	Yes	Yes	
Devil May Cry 2	PlayStation 2	January 25, 2003	Capcom	Yes	Yes	Yes	Yes	
Devil May Cry 2	PlayStation 3	March 22, 2012	Capcom	Yes	Yes	Yes	Yes	
Devil May Cry 2	Xbox 360	March 22, 2012	Capcom	Yes	Yes	Yes	Yes	
Devil May Cry 2	Microsoft Windows	March 13, 2018	Capcom	Yes	Yes	Yes	Yes	
Devil May Cry 2	PlayStation 4	March 13, 2018	Capcom	Yes	Yes	Yes	Yes	
Devil May Cry 2	Xbox One	March 13, 2018	Capcom	Yes	Yes	Yes	Yes	
Devil May Cry 2	Nintendo Switch	September 19, 2019	Capcom	Yes	Yes	Yes	Yes	
Devil May Cry 3: Dante's Awakening	PlayStation 2	February 17, 2005	Capcom	Yes	Yes	Yes	Yes	
Devil May Cry 3: Special Edition	PlayStation 2	January 24, 2006	Capcom	Yes	Yes	Yes	Yes	
Devil May Cry 3: Special Edition	Microsoft Windows	June 28, 2006	Capcom	Yes	Yes	Yes	Yes	
Devil May Cry 3: Special Edition	PlayStation 3	March 22, 2012	Capcom	Yes	Yes	Yes	Yes	
Devil May Cry 3: Special Edition	Xbox 360	March 22, 2012	Capcom	Yes	Yes	Yes	Yes	
Devil May Cry 3: Special Edition	PlayStation 4	March 13, 2018	Capcom	Yes	Yes	Yes	Yes	
Devil May Cry 3: Special Edition	Xbox One	March 13, 2018	Capcom	Yes	Yes	Yes	Yes	
Devil May Cry 3: Special Edition	Nintendo Switch	February 20, 2020	Capcom	Yes	Yes	Yes	Yes	
Devil May Cry 4	PlayStation 3	January 31, 2008	Capcom	Yes	Yes	Yes	Yes	
Devil May Cry 4	Xbox 360	January 31, 2008	Capcom	Yes	Yes	Yes	Yes	
Devil May Cry 4	Microsoft Windows	July 8, 2008	Capcom	Yes	Yes	Yes	Yes	
Devil May Cry 4: Refrain	Android	February 3, 2011	Capcom	Yes	Yes	Yes	Yes	
Devil May Cry 4: Refrain	iOS	February 3, 2011	Capcom	Yes	Yes	Yes	Yes	
Devil May Cry 4: Special Edition	PlayStation 4	June 18, 2015	Capcom	Yes	Yes	Yes	Yes	
Devil May Cry 4: Special Edition	Xbox One	June 18, 2015	Capcom	Yes	Yes	Yes	Yes	
Devil May Cry 4: Special Edition	Microsoft Windows	June 23, 2015	Capcom	Yes	Yes	Yes	Yes	
Devil May Cry 5	Microsoft Windows	March 8, 2019	Capcom	Yes	Yes	Yes	Yes	
Devil May Cry 5	PlayStation 4	March 8, 2019	Capcom	Yes	Yes	Yes	Yes	
Devil May Cry 5	Xbox One	March 8, 2019	Capcom	Yes	Yes	Yes	Yes	
Devil May Cry 5: Devil Hunter Edition	Nintendo Switch 2	June 23, 2026	Capcom	Yes	Yes	Yes	Yes	
Devil May Cry 5: Special Edition	Xbox Series X/S	November 10, 2020	Capcom	Yes	Yes	Yes	Yes	
Devil May Cry 5: Special Edition	PlayStation 5	November 12, 2020	Capcom	Yes	Yes	Yes	Yes	
Devil May Cry: HD Collection	PlayStation 3	March 22, 2012	Capcom	Yes	Yes	Yes	Yes	
Devil May Cry: HD Collection	Xbox 360	March 22, 2012	Capcom	Yes	Yes	Yes	Yes	
Devil May Cry: HD Collection	Microsoft Windows	March 13, 2018	Capcom	Yes	Yes	Yes	Yes	
Devil May Cry: HD Collection	PlayStation 4	March 13, 2018	Capcom	Yes	Yes	Yes	Yes	
Devil May Cry: HD Collection	Xbox One	March 13, 2018	Capcom	Yes	Yes	Yes	Yes	
Dimahoo	Arcade	January 21, 2000	8ing/Raizing	Yes	Yes	Yes	Yes	
Dino Crisis	PlayStation	July 1, 1999	Capcom	Yes	Yes	Yes		
Dino Crisis	Dreamcast	September 6, 2000	Capcom	Yes	Yes	Yes		
Dino Crisis	Microsoft Windows	September 15, 2000	Capcom		Yes	Yes		
Dino Crisis	PlayStation Network	2006	Capcom	Yes	Yes	Yes	Yes	
Dino Crisis 2	PlayStation	September 13, 2000	Capcom	Yes	Yes	Yes		
Dino Crisis 2	Microsoft Windows	August 20, 2002	Capcom		Yes	Yes		
Dino Crisis 2	PlayStation Network	2006	Capcom	Yes	Yes	Yes	Yes	
Dino Crisis 3	Xbox	June 26, 2003	Capcom	Yes	Yes	Yes		
Dino Stalker	PlayStation 2	June 27, 2002	Capcom	Yes	Yes	Yes		
Disney's Aladdin	Super Nintendo Entertainment System	November 21, 1993	Capcom	Yes	Yes	Yes		
Disney's Aladdin	Game Boy Advance	August 1, 2003	Capcom	Yes	Yes	Yes		
Disney's Hide and Sneak	GameCube	November 30, 2003	Capcom	Yes	Yes	Yes		
Disney's Magical Mirror Starring Mickey Mouse	GameCube	August 9, 2002	Capcom	Yes	Yes	Yes		
Disney's Magical Quest Starring Mickey Mouse	Game Boy Advance	August 9, 2002	Capcom	Yes	Yes	Yes		
Disney's Magical Quest Starring Mickey Mouse	Super Nintendo Entertainment System	November 20, 1992	Capcom	Yes	Yes	Yes		
Disney's Magical Quest 2 Starring Mickey and Minnie	Super Nintendo Entertainment System	November 11, 1994	Capcom	Yes	Yes	Yes		
Disney's Magical Quest 2 Starring Mickey and Minnie	Sega Mega Drive/Genesis	December 6, 1994	Capcom	Yes	Yes			
Disney's Magical Quest 2 Starring Mickey and Minnie	Game Boy Advance	July 18, 2003	Capcom	Yes	Yes	Yes		
Disney's Magical Quest 3 Starring Mickey & Donald	Game Boy Advance	November 21, 2003	Capcom	Yes	Yes	Yes		
Disney's Magical Quest 3 Starring Mickey & Donald	Super Nintendo Entertainment System	December 8, 1995	Capcom	Yes				
DmC: Devil May Cry	PlayStation 3	January 15, 2013	Ninja Theory	Yes	Yes	Yes	Yes	
DmC: Devil May Cry	Xbox 360	January 15, 2013	Ninja Theory	Yes	Yes	Yes	Yes	
DmC: Devil May Cry	Microsoft Windows	January 24, 2013	Ninja Theory	Yes	Yes	Yes	Yes	
DmC: Devil May Cry: Definitive Edition	PlayStation 4	March 10, 2015	Ninja Theory	Yes	Yes	Yes	Yes	
DmC: Devil May Cry: Definitive Edition	Xbox One	March 10, 2015	Ninja Theory	Yes	Yes	Yes	Yes	
Dokaben	Arcade	March 1989	Capcom	Yes				
Dokaben II	Arcade	August 1989	Capcom	Yes				
Dragon's Dogma	PlayStation 3	May 22, 2012	Capcom	Yes	Yes	Yes	Yes	
Dragon's Dogma	Xbox 360	May 22, 2012	Capcom	Yes	Yes	Yes	Yes	
Dragon's Dogma: Dark Arisen	PlayStation 3	April 23, 2013	Capcom	Yes	Yes	Yes	Yes	
Dragon's Dogma: Dark Arisen	Xbox 360	April 23, 2013	Capcom	Yes	Yes	Yes	Yes	
Dragon's Dogma: Dark Arisen	Microsoft Windows	January 15, 2016	Capcom	Yes	Yes	Yes	Yes	
Dragon's Dogma: Dark Arisen	PlayStation 4	October 3, 2017	Capcom	Yes	Yes	Yes	Yes	
Dragon's Dogma: Dark Arisen	Xbox One	October 3, 2017	Capcom	Yes	Yes	Yes	Yes	
Dragon's Dogma: Dark Arisen	Nintendo Switch	April 23, 2019	Capcom	Yes	Yes	Yes	Yes	
Dragon's Dogma II	PlayStation 5 & Windows & Xbox Series X/S	March 24, 2024	Capcom	Yes	Yes	Yes	Yes	
DuckTales	Game Boy	September 14, 1989	Capcom	Yes	Yes	Yes	Yes	
DuckTales	Nintendo Entertainment System	September 1989	Capcom	Yes	Yes	Yes		
DuckTales 2	Game Boy	November 1993	Make Software	Yes	Yes	Yes		
DuckTales 2	Nintendo Entertainment System	April 23, 1993	Make Software	Yes	Yes			
DuckTales: Remastered	Nintendo eShop	August 13, 2013	WayForward Technologies		Yes	Yes		
DuckTales: Remastered	Microsoft Windows	August 13, 2013	WayForward Technologies		Yes	Yes		
DuckTales: Remastered	PlayStation Network	August 13, 2013	WayForward Technologies		Yes	Yes		
DuckTales: Remastered	PlayStation 3	August 20, 2013	WayForward Technologies		Yes			
DuckTales: Remastered	Xbox Live Marketplace	September 11, 2013	WayForward Technologies		Yes			
DuckTales: Remastered	iOS	April 2, 2015	WayForward Technologies	Yes	Yes	Yes	Yes	
DuckTales: Remastered	Android	April 2, 2015	WayForward Technologies	Yes	Yes	Yes	Yes	
DuckTales: Remastered	Windows Phone	April 2, 2015	WayForward Technologies	Yes	Yes	Yes	Yes	
Dungeons & Dragons Collection	Sega Saturn	March 4, 1999	Capcom	Yes				
Dungeons & Dragons: Chronicles of Mystara	Arcade	August 22, 2013	Iron Galaxy Studios		Yes	Yes	Yes	
Dungeons & Dragons: Chronicles of Mystara	Nintendo eShop	August 22, 2013	Iron Galaxy Studios		Yes	Yes	Yes	
Dungeons & Dragons: Chronicles of Mystara	PlayStation Network	August 22, 2013	Iron Galaxy Studios		Yes	Yes	Yes	
Dungeons & Dragons: Chronicles of Mystara	Xbox Live Marketplace	August 22, 2013	Iron Galaxy Studios		Yes	Yes	Yes	
Dungeons & Dragons: Shadow over Mystara	Arcade	February 6, 1996	Capcom	Yes	Yes	Yes	Yes	
Dungeons & Dragons: Tower of Doom	Arcade	January 13, 1994	Capcom	Yes	Yes			
Dustforce	PlayStation 3	February 4, 2014	Hitbox Team		Yes	Yes		
Dustforce	PlayStation Vita	February 4, 2014	Hitbox Team		Yes	Yes		
Dustforce	Xbox 360	April 25, 2014	Hitbox Team	Yes	Yes	Yes	Yes	
Dynasty Wars	Arcade	April 1989	Capcom	Yes	Yes	Yes	Yes	
