= Bionic Commando: Elite Forces =

2000 platform video game

- Developer: Nintendo Software Technology
- Publisher: Nintendo
- Director: Josh Atkins
- Designer: Akila Redmer
- Programmer: Samir Abou-Samra
- Artist: Raymond Yan
- Composer: Lawrence Schwedler
- Series: Bionic Commando
- Platform: Game Boy Color
- Release: NA: January 24, 2000; AU: January 2000
- Genres: Platform game, Metroidvania
- Mode: Single-player

Bionic Commando: Elite Forces is a 2000 platform video game developed by Nintendo Software Technology and published by Nintendo for the Game Boy Color. Part of Capcom's Bionic Commando series developed under license by Nintendo, it was the first title to be developed by its Redmond-based first-party studio Nintendo Software Technology. It is the sequel to the Game Boy version of Bionic Commando. It was not released in Europe until November 2014, when it was finally released for the Nintendo 3DS Virtual Console there.

== Gameplay ==
Though the player still cannot jump, Elite Forces is different from the rest of the Bionic Commando series; among the changes are a different plot, new moves for the main characters - an unnamed female commando and an unnamed male commando - and the ability to utilize a sniper rifle in some segments of the game.

The game features stages arranged on a map screen akin to Super Mario Bros. 3, with some levels being traditional side scrolling platformers, with others being top-down shooters, or auto-scroller segments. The player receives exposition from "codec" calls, and may also choose specific items or weapons before levels.

There are a few bosses placed in large arenas, and ending slideshow with captions immediately following the final boss.

== Plot ==
The peaceful land of Karinia is being terrorized by an evil man named Arturus. He is the leader of an evil army called the Avars, who have terrorized Karinia for years. As the Elite Forces fight the Avars, they receive a fragmented communication from Commander Joe (presumably Super Joe), an ally who had infiltrated their territory. Joe's message revealed that Arturus was planning to launch the Albatross Project. After that, communication with Cmdr. Joe was lost. The Bionic Corps contacted the Elite Forces to help stop the Avars, prevent the fall of Karinia, and rescue Joe. It is essentially a repeat of the events of the 1988 Bionic Commando, except with a different twist by the end - rather than the resurrection of a long-dead dictator, it is revealed that the Albatross was originally a wrecked space vessel of unknown origin that can give its owner mutant powers.

== Reception ==
Reception

Aggregate score
Aggregator	Score
GameRankings	84%

Review scores
Publication	Score
AllGame	2/5
Game Informer	8.25/10
GameSpot	9/10
IGN	8/10
Nintendo Life	7/10
Nintendo Power	8.3/10

The game received "favorable" reviews according to the review aggregation website GameRankings.

== See also ==
- Bionic Commando, for other games in the series.
