= Bionic Commando Rearmed 2 =

2011 video game

- Official game art
- Developer: Fatshark
- Publisher: Capcom
- Director: Anders De Geer
- Producer: Robert Backstrom
- Programmer: Robin Hagblom
- Artist: Arvid Nilsson
- Composer: Simon Viklund
- Series: Bionic Commando
- Engine: Diesel Engine
- Platforms: PlayStation 3; Xbox 360
- Release: PS3: NA: February 1, 2011; WW: February 2, 2011; Xbox 360: WW: February 2, 2011
- Genre: Run-and-gun platform
- Modes: Single-player, multiplayer

Bionic Commando Rearmed 2 is a 2011 run-and-gun platform game developed by Fatshark and published by Capcom. A sequel to Bionic Commando Rearmed, it features enhancements to protagonist Rad Spencer's bionic arm, which he primarily uses to grapple objects and swing from them. New bionic enhancements include abilities such as hacking data terminals, a powerful uppercut, and firing grenades.

The plot revolves around a dictator named General Sabio and a missing commander from Spencer's organization, Colonel Brubaker. Spencer and a team of four other bionics are sent to locate Brubaker and his platoon and help them finish their mission of disarming Sabio's missiles. The team's original mission evolves as the bionics, split into three teams, encounter opposition greater than they have previously faced. Reception from critics was mixed. Some critics praised the new gameplay mechanics, while others felt that it was a step down from its predecessor.

Bionic Commando Rearmed 2 is included in Capcom Digital Collection.

== Gameplay ==
Bionic Commando Rearmed 2 features many of the action gameplay elements from the original Rearmed. The game is played from a 2.5D perspective, where the player is able to move horizontally and vertically. The protagonist is equipped with a bionic arm that can be used to grapple onto scenery, allowing the player to ascend or to swing to otherwise unreachable areas. The arm can also be used as a defensive mechanism, allowing the player to grab barrels and enemies and use them as shields, and to repel larger enemies. Rearmed 2 changes traditional mechanics slightly, requiring the player to press a button to release the arm from its hold point. This lets the player use their momentum to swing in any desired arc.

Bionic Commando Rearmed 2 includes an upgrade system which allows protagonist Rad Spencer to equip both passive and combative features to his bionic arm.

Challenge rooms return in Rearmed 2, but have been altered to require the use of specific abilities in certain challenges. Rearmed 2 features 24 challenge rooms, which are unlocked in a progressive order instead of a group at a time as seen in Bionic Commando Rearmed. Local cooperative gameplay also returns, with the second player controlling a version of Spencer that resembles the one on the cover of the NES version of Bionic Commando.

Rearmed 2 also features new gameplay mechanics. Some of these were first introduced in the 2009 action-adventure game Bionic Commando. These include the ability to jump and maneuver, known as Death From Above, in which the player slams into the ground upon landing from a fall, causing a shockwave to affect nearby enemies. Once the game is completed, the player may activate Retro mode which disables the ability to jump. The player can also climb over small obstacles, or onto slightly higher elevations. Entirely new to the series are Components, which are items and attributes that can be equipped to enhance the player character. Components include a grenade launcher attachment for the bionic arm and a passive health regeneration ability. The player can upgrade or change Spencer's abilities in the enhancements screen during gameplay. Another new addition to the series is the ability to enter a scanning mode known as Bio Vision. While in this mode, the player can search for secrets and scan facts about enemies and locales which may help them progress through the game.

Absent from Bionic Commando Rearmed 2 are top-down levels, which in its predecessor symbolized an enemy attack while en route to a location. When the game's producer, Rey Jimenez, was asked why they are being excluded, he responded "People liked them because they were in the original, but I don't remember hearing anyone say that was their favorite part of the game. It doesn't have the swinging, you know?" The game also has linear level progression, without the option to choose the path. However, the player can return to prior levels by using newly acquired abilities and weaponry, and access areas that were previously unreachable, similar to Metroidvania games.

== Synopsis ==
Bionic Commando Rearmed 2 takes place a few years after Bionic Commando Rearmed and prior to 2009's Bionic Commando. In the game, a dictator named General Sabio from the Papagayan Islands threatens to attack the FSA, protagonist Rad Spencer's organization. The FSA sends Colonel Brubaker to confront the dictator, but Brubaker disappears shortly after arriving. In response, a team of five bionics, including Spencer, are sent to combat the threat and locate Brubaker. The group arrives on the islands via helicopter and divides into three teams. Spencer, being the commander, operates alone while the other teams operate in pairs.

En route to Brubaker's last known location, Spencer receives a communication from Mag, one of the team leaders, telling him that "something huge" had attacked them, taken her partner McNamara's bionic arm, and forced them to separate. Spencer instructs the team to regroup at Brubaker's last coordinates. Upon arriving, Spencer finds the area in shambles with Brubaker's forces dead. Spencer soon discovers that a large mechanized robot designated GORILLA is responsible for the carnage. After disabling the robot, Spencer contacts FSA headquarters to inform them of the situation and the possible demise of Brubaker. Spencer's commanding officer, Joe Gibson (Super Joe), tells him that Brubaker is indeed alive, as his tracking device is still active. He informs Spencer that he may have been taken captive as his signal appears to be moving quickly across the island. Spencer is again tasked with rescuing Brubaker at all costs and completing his mission.

Shortly afterward, Spencer finds one of his operatives, Wilcox, dying outside a factory. Wilcox tells him "something huge" took his bionic legs, killed Hauser, and left him for dead. As Spencer begins to signal for help, Wilcox dies. Deep in the factory, Spencer confronts GORILLA, disabling it again. He is then contacted by McNamara, one of his remaining team members, who struggles to tell Spencer that he must find and disable missiles armed by General Sabio. Upon finding Brubaker's signal, Spencer is knocked unconscious by poisonous gas while contacting Super Joe. He is placed in a high security prison by Sabio's men, which he promptly escapes. Outside he learns from Mag that Brubaker had actually lost his legs and an arm in the FSA's service. Following a hunch, he heads to a nearby facility. Inside he finds Brubaker, equipped with the bionic legs and arm from Spencer's teammates Wilcox and McNamara. He tells Spencer that he has orchestrated a war between the FSA and Sabio's army. In exchange for Sabio's help retrieving and installing the bionic parts, Brubaker gave Sabio the coordinates and performance data for all of the FSA missile batteries, giving Sabio the upper hand in the coming war. After a confrontation, the GORILLA robot appears. Brubaker orders it to kill Spencer. However, the robot now sees Brubaker as an "extreme bionic" and confronts him instead, thus allowing Spencer to escape.

Spencer makes his way to Sabio's headquarters to disarm the missiles. He attempts to convince Sabio of Brubaker's treachery, but is unsuccessful. Defeating Sabio, he boards one of the missiles as it takes off. Spencer disarms several missiles while en route to their target, but is unable to disarm the last missile in time. Upon awakening from the final missile's impact, he is astonished to find that he is alive and the missile did not explode. He encounters McNamara, who struggles to tell him that he was the one who disabled the final missile. Spencer notices McNamara has equipped the bionic arm of his fallen teammate Hauser in place of his lost arm. As each bionic is synchronized for only one user, the merge drives McNamara insane. Spencer reluctantly battles and defeats the crazed McNamara.

In the game's epilogue, the player learns that the public was initially grateful for the bionics' service, but soon began to be fearful and distrust the bionics as more details of the conflict were revealed. The bionic program was ordered to be disbanded and all implants removed or disabled. The player also learns Super Joe placed the weight of the conflict on Spencer, something that would later drive him to his villainous ways in the future.

== Development ==
The protagonist, Rad Spencer, received a slight redesign for Rearmed 2 (left) from his original Rearmed design (right). The change was well received by critics.

Bionic Commando Rearmed 2 was revealed at Capcom's Captivate 2010 event on April 20, 2010. It was developed with the Diesel engine, which was used on both Rearmed and 2009's Bionic Commando. The protagonist, Rad Spencer, received a visual redesign for the sequel to tie in the years between Rearmed and the 2009 3D game. Spencer is equipped with an updated arm, has changed his hairstyle, and has grown a mustache.

The title originally started development under GRIN, who had developed the previous title. When the company folded four months into development, Fatshark took over, having previously worked with GRIN on other games. Some key employees worked with Fatshark following the closing of GRIN. Simon Viklund, creative director on the first Rearmed, was hired as a creative advisor to the Fatshark team. Regarding his position with Fatshark, Viklund remarked, "They were taking over things mid-project and I worked as a creative advisor during the hand-over to tell them what they were looking at." Viklund further commented that the initial design for the game involved events beyond the existing plot. "I wanted to start off there and end up in a city in the FSA where everyone can see a bionic fighting. [I thought it would be] a nice way to convey that now everyone will see that bionics can't always be controlled." He noted that this would be an event in which the public would notice the dangers of bionics and seek to outlaw them.

Cooperative gameplay is included once again, but limited to local multiplayer. Producer Ray Jimenez said the reason for this was that the developers "wanted to concentrate on the actual game itself rather than adding new features to it." The splitscreen gameplay was removed from cooperative gameplay. According to Fatshark's Robert Bäckström, the developers found that "gameplay became more fun if you played it on the same screen." Bäckström further stated that coop will feature modified gameplay, requiring players to work together to defeat level bosses. Developers added the ability to jump, along with several other abilities from the 2009 3D game Bionic Commando. The developers provided the ability to complete the entire game without ever jumping, which also results in an achievement or trophy. In an interview with Gamereactor, Robert Bäckström stated that although he did not know a definite release date, the developers had completed the game as of December 2010. It was later released in February 2011.

Simon Viklund returns as the composer for the sequel. The arrangements were created in Buzz, a freeware virtual studio program. Viklund cited games on the Nintendo Entertainment System as influences for Rearmed 2's music, including the Mega Man series, DuckTales, and Gun.Smoke. When asked about the possibility of a commercial release to the soundtrack, Viklund stated "I do encourage those who ask me if there will be a BCR2 soundtrack to contact Capcom. Really, it's up to them." A contest was held from July 16, 2010, to August 11, 2010, allowing fans to remix an 8-bit Bionic Commando track for inclusion in the game. On September 14, 2010, two winners were chosen. Their remixes were included in the music for Bionic Commando Rearmed 2. Regarding the winners' arrangements, Viklund stated "What I had to say about the winning submissions was that I think it's a cliché at this point to bring in the electric guitars on interpretations of old NES songs, and yet it's always nice to hear that (or any) cliché actually done well. Those two guys both did it really well."

== Reception ==
Reception

Aggregate score
Aggregator	Score	
Aggregator	PS3	Xbox 360
Metacritic	63/100	62/100

Review scores
Publication	Score	
Publication	PS3	Xbox 360
Destructoid	7/10	7/10
Edge	5/10	N/A
Eurogamer	N/A	6/10
Game Informer	7.25/10	7.25/10
GamePro	N/A	3/5
GameRevolution	C	C
GameSpot	5/10	5/10
GameTrailers	N/A	8.3/10
GameZone	N/A	5.5/10
Giant Bomb	3/5	3/5
IGN	6/10	6/10
Joystiq	N/A	3/5
Official Xbox Magazine (US)	N/A	6.5/10
PlayStation: The Official Magazine	6/10	N/A
The A.V. Club	B−	N/A

Bionic Commando Rearmed 2 received "mixed" reviews on both platforms according to the review aggregation website Metacritic. Most reviews cited it as inferior to its predecessor. Sales for 2011 were low, moving only 8,359 units on Xbox Live Arcade.

IGN's Daemon Hatfield gave the game a mediocre score and stated that it does not feel as special as the original Rearmed. He noted that the ability to jump makes the game "just another platformer." He also warned potential buyers of Rearmed 2 for the PlayStation 3, referencing the requirement that the player must sign into the PlayStation Network before starting the game, a form of digital rights management. Someone from GameTrailers gave the Xbox 360 version a more favorable review. He cited improvements to the swinging mechanics, but pointed out that some fans may not appreciate the jump mechanic.

Brett Elston of GamesRadar felt that the game seemed to be "a scaled-back version" of the original Rearmed. He felt the levels were "watered down" and cited poor frame rate issues. Reviewer Jobert Atienza of 1Up.com stated that "In many respects, it's exactly what I would expect from a follow-up: more of the same with minor enhancements. At the same time, it is just more of the same with some enhancements, but Fatshark seemed to be aiming to make the best damn sequel they could...just without rocking the boat too much." GameSpot's Tom McShea gave the game a poor review, criticizing cheap deaths and unresponsive controls. Bryan Vore of Game Informer praised the varied environments and the new jump mechanics, but noted that some of the boss battles did not make creative use of the bionic arm's abilities, like the original Rearmed.
