= Nathan Spencer =

Nathan Spencer may refer to:

- Nathan Spencer (Casualty) a fictional character from Casualty
- Nathan "Rad" Spencer, the protagonist of the Bionic Commando series
- Nathan Spencer (Rugby) Selby 3rd Team Centre/Ballet Dancer
