= Ben Judd =

American translator, producer, and agent (born 1974)

- Born: October 25, 1974 (age 52); Centerville, Ohio
- Occupations: Video game producer; translator; agent
- Years active: 2002–2019
- Employer(s): Formerly Digital Development Management, Formerly Dangen

Ben Judd (born October 25, 1974) is an American translator, producer, and agent. He is a former Capcom employee. Judd is an American and lives in Japan and became Capcom's first non-Japanese producer. Judd has had several voice acting cameos in his career, including the English voice of the character Phoenix Wright in the Ace Attorney series.

He formerly worked for Digital Development Management (DDM), a video game agency. At DDM, Judd helped organize the Kickstarter crowdsourcing campaigns for Mighty No. 9 and Bloodstained: Ritual of the Night as well as helped create the deal to make Scalebound. Judd is a co-founder of Dangen, a video game publisher.

Judd resigned as CEO of Dangen Entertainment following allegations of inappropriate behavior by multiple people who had worked with him.

== Career ==
=== Capcom (2002–2010) ===
Judd joined Capcom in 2002 where he worked in the localization department at Capcom at the Osaka, Japan, branch. Judd is a fluent speaker of Japanese, and speaks in the Kansai dialect. He helped write the English localization of Phoenix Wright: Ace Attorney, as well as providing the English voice to the character Phoenix Wright in the Ace Attorney series. He worked on the P.N.03 project, and also worked on the localization of Viewtiful Joe, Onimusha 3, God Hand and Resident Evil Outbreak. He would later become Head of Globalization at Capcom.

Judd became acquainted with Capcom senior corporate officer Keiji Inafune while working on Dead Rising. Judd would often act as a translator to Inafune at press events.

Judd says he is a big fan of the original Bionic Commando games. He says he made an original pitch for a new Bionic Commando game in 2004, but the pitch was not approved by higher ups at Capcom. Judd was producer for two Bionic Commando games and Judd states that Inafune gave his support to both projects. The titles were developed by Swedish developer Grin, and Judd expressed views at the 2008 Tokyo Game Show that Japanese developers lagged behind Western developers. This made him the first foreign producer at Capcom. In 2008, Judd also expressed interest in a new Bionic Commando title for the Wii.

The first released was Bionic Commando Rearmed, 2008. The game was digitally distributed and sold over 130,000 copies during the launch week. The second title was Bionic Commando, released in 2009. The title sold 27,000 copies in America in its first week. As of 2018, the game has sold 1.1 million copies.

Judd acted as translator for Japanese video game producer Keiji Inafune when he appeared at the 2009 Tokyo Game Show and Inafune criticized the state of Japanese video games. Inafune, through Judd, stated, "Man, Japan is over. We're done. Our game industry is finished,"

Judd was to oversee the development of a first-person shooter Mega Man game code-named Maverick Hunter. However, the project was cancelled in late 2010.

=== Digital Development Management (2011–2019) ===
Judd left Capcom in 2011 and joined Digital Development Management (DDM). He was the Director of Business Development at DDM Agency and was the Vice President and head of DDM Japan. At DDM, Judd helped organize the Kickstarter crowdsourcing campaigns for Mighty No. 9 and Bloodstained: Ritual of the Night. He later worked as Comcept's agent.

Following the release of Mighty No. 9, Judd hosted a livestream and translated for Inafune. Judd was highly critical of the game's development, (Note: "In this case, it was do the base game and do all the ports all at the same time. And it ended up being a huge amount of work, more than they actually estimated. Definitely, when they looked at the project, they were wrong about a lot of things. They underestimated how much work, time and money was going to be necessary. All of those things create a huge amount of pressure.") and also said the game was "better than nothing", a quote that at first was mistakenly attributed to Inafune. Judd has not represented Comcept since 2017, when they were purchased by Level-5, and became Level-5 Comcept.

Judd is Koji Igarashi's agent and translator. Igarashi hired Judd after leaving Konami, and he attempted to find funding for Igarashi's new project. Judd later introduced Igarashi to Inti Creates.

Judd set up a deal with Microsoft for PlatinumGames to develop the action role playing game Scalebound. The game was later cancelled in 2017. He has also acted as a translator for Hideki Kamiya. Judd acted as a translator for Kamiya and Inaba for the announcement of Bayonetta 3.

=== Indie games ===
In 2017, Judd co-founded Dangen, an independent video game publisher in Japan. Dangen focuses on publishing Western independent titles in Japan. Atsushi Inaba, co-founder of PlatinumGames, is advising Dangen.

Judd helped organize the "Indie Megashow" held on September 20, 2017, in Tokyo. The event was part of a series of events called "Indie Megabooth", that showed off independent games. Igarashi and Tetsuya Mizuguchi were also in attendance.

Judd has made regular appearance at Bitsummit, an annual independent gaming show in Kyoto. Judd was the MC for the Bitsummit events in 2013, 2016, and 2017. At the third Bitsummit in 2015, he was the moderator for a discussion with Atsushi Inaba. At the fourth Bitsummit in 2016, Judd led a panel discussion with Ian Flood of Yacht Club Games, Takuya Aizu of Inti-Creates, and Rhodri Broadbent of Dakko Dakko.

In 2019, following reports of mismanagement and sexual harassment by Judd, he stepped down as CEO of Dangen Entertainment, and was replaced by Dan Stern.

In November 2019, an anonymous designer who worked with Dangen (verified by USGamer to be legitimate) accused him of predatory behavior and violations of non-disclosure agreements, as well as negligent behavior when handling the release of certain games. Another anonymous source had reason to believe the allegations, and suspected that their prominence prevented people from speaking up about it. Dangen came to an agreement with the game developer in 2021.

In May 2024, Matsuzo Machida and Studio Wildrose makers of the upcoming game Penny Blood filed a lawsuit against Ben Judd and Dangen Entertainment, who managed the double Kickstarter campaign, over breach of contract for failing to disburse production funds earned from the Kickstarter. As of July 2024, the game has been unable to secure a publisher due to these issues.
