= Dark Void Zero =

2010 platform video game

- Developer: Other Ocean Interactive
- Publisher: Capcom
- Platforms: DSiWare; Windows iOS
- Release: DSiWare: NA: January 18, 2010; EU: March 5, 2010; iOS, Windows; April 12, 2010
- Genres: Action, Platform, Metroidvania
- Mode: Single-player

Dark Void Zero is a platform video game developed by Other Ocean Interactive's Newfoundland studio and published by Capcom for DSiWare. It was made as an April Fools parody of the video game Dark Void and was later decided to make it an actual title; it was promoted as a game "found" in Capcom's vault. The game was released in April 2010 for iOS and on Microsoft Windows through Steam.

Capcom announced through the Steam page that on May 8, 2024, Dark Void Zero, Flock!, and Dark Void would be delisted, meaning no additional purchases could be made on the platform. Dark Void Zero never received a physical release, leaving it permanently unavailable.

== Plot ==
In an unspecified year, aliens, called Watchers, came from an extinct planet, searching for a new home. Then they found Earth. The military was able to hold them away from it, but then they built portals in an area in outer space, the Void. These portals linked to various locations on Earth, but they were unstable, and could not be used efficiently. But eventually, in the middle of the Void, they built a final, stable portal, which was still in the process of linking with Earth.

Many skilled soldiers were sent into the Void, all of them meeting their ends. Until finally, the military sent in experts: A soldier named Rusty, who was actually born in the Void, and Nikola Tesla. Once there, they began to charge through the Watchers' forces, stealing the portal control codes from two bases set up in the void, until finally moving onto a third facility, where the main portal was kept, and where the final code was also guarded, more closely than the previous two. There, Rusty and Tesla would finally attempt to shut down the portal and save mankind.

== Development ==
Capcom-Unity manager Seth Killian stated that Dark Void Zero started as a joke after he had heard an 8-bit rendition of Dark Void's main theme in its end credits. This song, along with the soundtrack of Dark Void Zero, was composed by Battlestar Galactica composer Bear McCreary.

At the beginning of the game, players must blow into the Nintendo DSi's microphone to clear the dust off of an in-game cartridge, similar to how NES cartridges would have to be blown into at times.

Talk show host Jimmy Fallon lent his name in the game based on a fictional story where Fallon won a contest from Capcom during his younger years. He was included in it as "Captain Jimmy Fallon".

=== Fictional development ===
The fictional story of the development of Dark Void Zero is given in the official trailer as:

In the year 198X, the PlayChoice-10 was the first arcade cabinet to feature two interactive screens. Capcom soon began developing a game to make use of this advanced technology. This ground breaking title was called: Dark Void. Unfortunately, the PlayChoice-10 was discontinued and the project was cancelled. In the year 20XX, Capcom found the project buried deep inside its vault. Its concept inspired a new adventure of the same name. But... the original game... locked away for decades... is now back from the void...

However, this story contradicts the one given in the DSiWare Shop summary, which states that Dark Void Zero was a "legendary 'lost project'" at Capcom, recreated for the DSi, rather than being forgotten until 2010 and being a port of the original.

== Reception ==
Reception

Aggregate score
Aggregator	Score	
Aggregator	DS	iOS
Metacritic	84/100	81/100

Review scores
Publication	Score	
Publication	DS	iOS
1Up.com	A	N/A
GamePro	N/A	4.5/5
GameSpot	8.5/10	N/A
GameTrailers	N/A	N/A
IGN	8.5/10	8/10
Nintendo Life	9/10	N/A
Nintendo World Report	9/10	N/A
Official Nintendo Magazine	85%	N/A
PC Format	N/A	N/A

The DS and iOS versions received "favorable" reviews according to the review aggregation website Metacritic.

While 2D-X editor-in-chief Jeffrey L. Wilson initially criticized Dark Void Zero as being exploitative of the retro gaming genre, he later retracted his statement after playing it at the 2010 Consumer Electronics Show (CES), commenting that it felt like a NES-era title. GamePro editor Dave Rudden called it one of the coolest games at the CES, comparing it to the "Metroidvania" genre, which is a combination of the styles of Metroid and Castlevania, as well as video games such as Contra. Kombo editor David Oxford commented that Dark Void Zero was better than its parent video game, comparing it to Bionic Commando Rearmed in how both promotional games surpassed the games they were promoting.
