= Disney's Magical Mirror Starring Mickey Mouse =

2002 video game

- North American GameCube cover art
- Developer: Capcom (Note: Additional work by Polygon Magic)
- Publisher: Nintendo
- Directors: Makoto Ikehara; Kosuke Nasu; Toshihiko Kurata; Takanori Uegaki
- Producers: Shigeru Miyamoto; Luigi Priore; Kenji Miki; Tatsuya Minami; Hironobu Takeshita
- Composer: Seiko Kobuchi
- Platform: GameCube
- Release: JP: August 9, 2002; NA: August 13, 2002; EU: September 13, 2002; AU: September 19, 2002
- Genre: Adventure
- Mode: Single-player

Disney's Magical Mirror Starring Mickey Mouse (Note: Known in Japan as Mickey Mouse no Fushigi na Kagami (Japanese: ミッキーマウスの不思議(ふしぎ)な鏡(かがみ), Hepburn: Mikkī Mausu no Fushigi na Kagami; lit. Mickey Mouse's Mysterious Mirror)) is a point-and-click adventure video game developed by Capcom and published by Nintendo under license from Disney Interactive for the GameCube. It follows the titular character Mickey Mouse as he explores a mansion within a mirror world, collecting 12 mirror shards in order to escape while a playful ghost taunts him throughout his journey.

== Gameplay ==
The game uses a simple point-and-click mechanic, similar to Pac-Man 2: The New Adventures, which involves using a cursor to guide Mickey Mouse to various locations. Mickey will react to what the player does and what he encounters in the game by expressing curiosity, getting mad, falling down, running away, standing his ground, or other actions. At certain points, the player is able to have Mickey perform a special move that generally involves having him deal with an onscreen enemy. Gags must be pulled to help Mickey obtain helpful objects or clear a path, but not all of them will give Mickey something. Magic star containers must be collected in order to pull gags, but some cost a certain number of stars. Once a gag is pulled, the meter drains, but can be recharged by collecting stars found throughout the game.

Mini-games, such as having Mickey fly an airplane or ski down a mountain, are available throughout the game. Special souvenirs may be uncovered as well, which are displayed in Mickey's room at the end of the game, such as Pluto's collar or Minnie's bow. The objective of the game is to find all the pieces of the mirror so that Mickey goes back home.

== Plot ==
One night when Mickey is fast asleep, he falls into a dream where a mischievous ghost traps a dream vision of himself inside a magic mirror. Stuck in a large mansion within an alternate universe that strangely resembles his own house, Mickey yearns to get back through the mirror to the real world in order to wake up from his dreamlike state. However, the ghost destroys the mirror and the pieces shrink and fly off to different areas around the house, which turns the magic mirror into a normal mirror. The player must direct Mickey to outwit and pull gags in order to get past enemies, obstacles, and the aforementioned ghost and recover the twelve broken mirror pieces he needs to go home again and search for twelve magic star containers (needed to pull gags) and items needed to help him throughout his quest. Whenever he finds a mirror piece, it will fly back to the mirror, return to its normal size, and put itself back in place; once Mickey has obtained at least eight mirror pieces, he will be able to use the mirror to return home.

After repairing the mirror, Mickey prepares to leave, but the ghost stops him, revealing that it only brought him here so it can have someone to play with. The player could either choose to stay or go. Choosing to stay will make the ghost run off, leaving Mickey stuck in the alternate world until he re-enters the mirror room where the player can choose to stay or leave again. If the player chooses to leave, Mickey says goodbye to the ghost and begins to go home, but the ghost decides to go with him (only if the player has collected all the mirror pieces). After Mickey wakes up, he goes downstairs to get something to eat. If the player repairs the mirror with all twelve pieces found, a model of the ghost is shown hanging on the ceiling fan and the ghost's laughter is heard, implying that the ghost is now residing in Mickey's house.

== Development ==
The game was teased at the 2001 Electronic Entertainment Expo presentation with a series of screenshots, which was assumed to be a platformer like much the vein of Disney's Magical Quest on the Super NES. It was also announced that Nintendo would handle the publication of the title. The title was formally announced at the 2002 Electronic Entertainment Expo.

The game's introduction sequence is loosely based on Thru the Mirror, a 1936 Mickey Mouse cartoon. Mickey's animations are replicated from the short. An alternate scene later in the game, where Mickey grows to a tremendous size then shrinks to a minuscule size, was also replicated as in the cartoon.

== Reception ==
Reception

Aggregate score
Aggregator	Score
Metacritic	50/100

Review scores
Publication	Score
AllGame	2.5/5
Famitsu	27/40
GameSpot	4.6/10
GameSpy	2/5
IGN	4.8/10
Jeuxvideo.com	10/20
MeriStation	5/10
Nintendo Power	3.8/5
Nintendo World Report	7/10
Official Nintendo Magazine	6/10

The game received "mixed" reviews according to the review aggregation website Metacritic. For the most part, the player is given no instructions and cut scenes are limited to watching Mickey get chased or falling through to the next area. In Japan, Famitsu gave it a score of 27 out of 40.

GameSpot said, "The incredibly slow pacing and monotonous puzzles will override the Disney entertainment factor for the young as well." IGN wrote, "It's just plain boring and often tedious. Most kids will find the game as just that, and for the monetary investment, it's not recommended." GameSpy wrote, "Geared towards a younger audience, Mickey is mind-numbingly simple, and it's a shame that such impressive visuals had to go to waste on such a disposable game."

== See also ==
- Disney's Hide and Sneak – 2003 video game
- List of Disney video games
