= Bionic Commando (2009 video game) =

- Developer: Grin
- Publisher: Capcom
- Director: Ulf Andersson
- Producer: Ben Judd
- Designer: Anders Jonsson
- Programmer: Anders Jonsson
- Artist: Lars Bonde
- Composer: Jamie Christopherson
- Series: Bionic Commando
- Engine: Diesel engine
- Platforms: PlayStation 3, Xbox 360, Microsoft Windows
- Release: PlayStation 3 & Xbox 360: NA: May 19, 2009; AU: May 21, 2009; EU: May 22, 2009; JP: June 25, 2009; Microsoft Windows: NA: July 28, 2009; JP: October 29, 2009; EU: October 30, 2009; AU: 2009
- Genres: Action-adventure, third-person shooter
- Modes: Single-player, multiplayer

Bionic Commando is a 2009 action-adventure game developed by Grin and published by Capcom. Part of the Bionic Commando series, it is a sequel to the 1988 game Bionic Commando, with certain storyline elements taken from its 2008 remake Bionic Commando Rearmed. It runs on Grin's Diesel engine.

== Gameplay ==
Bionic Commando is an action-adventure game, in which the player controls player character Nathan Spencer. The game uses several mechanics (primarily radiation) which act as barriers. These barriers are used to keep the players within the confines of the linear level design. Nathan Spencer is able to target enemies while hanging, climbing a building or even in mid-swing, while using an implement called the 'Bionic Arm' which can also be used to attack enemies at close range. The bionic arm can be used to grab and launch objects such as boulders and cars at enemies. In addition, he is equipped with boots that enable him to survive extremely long falls. Spencer is equipped with Tungsten gun, which is shot quickly but does minimum damage to the enemies, and Prototype gun, which fires fast and does maximum damage and he can use throwables such as grenades. The weapon reload mechanism is missing in the game and players must try to find the ammunition to use them. Players can also use special weapons such as sniper rifle, machine gun, shotgun, grenade launcher and missile launcher with limited amount of ammo. The ammunition can be found from the dead bodies and other parts of the game as well, with exception of the special weapon ammunitions which can be found rarely. The ammunition can be categorised by its color i.e. orange ammo for primary weapon, blue ammo for grenades and red ammo for special weapons. Spencer can also attack from a greater height by stomping the ground with his Bionic Arm, causing to kill multiple enemies at once, plus he can also hack drones and other systems with the attached arm. However, due to the heavy weight of the Bionic Arm, Spencer can not swim (although he could swim before he lost his arm) and as a result the players must find a way to get him grappled to a safe zone before he drowns.

== Synopsis ==
The main character of the game, Nathan Spencer

The events of the game take place ten years after the original game. The game follows Major Nathan "Rad" Spencer (voiced by Mike Patton), a government operative working in the fictional Ascension City and an Operative named Joseph Gibson aka "Super Joe" (voiced by Steven Blum) for the Tactical Arms and Security Committee (T.A.S.C) that trains bionic operatives like Spencer. After he is betrayed by his own government and falsely imprisoned, the Great Bionic Purge begins. Before his execution, an experimental weapon detonates in Ascension City, unleashing an earthquake along with a radioactive shock wave that leaves the city destroyed and wiping out its populace. The terrorist force known as the "BioReign" claims responsibility, threatening invasion. Spencer is freed to redeem his name along with the T.A.S.C's and is reunited with the bionic arm of which he was stripped.

During flashbacks the player learns that two years prior Spencer and his bionic partner Lt. Jayne Magdalene failed to eliminate two rogue bionics who had allegedly murdered a handful of people. Spencer resolved to help the two bionics escape when he and his partner discovered that the FSA were actively rounding up and forcibly rehabilitating bionics; something that both Spencer and Magdalene were themselves. Soon after the two rogue bionics and a wounded Lt. Magdalene escaped, Spencer was arrested by the FSA and sentenced to be executed for his treason.

Returning to the present, Gibson releases Spencer on the condition that he assist the FSA against the threat to Ascension City. When given this ultimatum in exchange for his freedom, Spencer initially turns it down, but Gibson tells him he has knowledge of Spencer's missing wife. As Spencer progresses through Ascension City, he discovers information on Project Vulture, a super weapon being sought after by the terrorists. Spencer is ordered to retrieve the item before the Bio-Reign terrorists can. After finally gaining access to the item, he is betrayed by Joe who reveals himself as the leader of Bio-Reign. Joe has also enlisted the help of Gottfried Groeder, a character introduced in Bionic Commando Rearmed.

Joe reveals that Spencer's wife never left, and alludes to the concept that she is actually part of Spencer's bionic arm. According to Super Joe, in order for bionics to work perfectly, they have to sync with their host on both an emotional and physical level. In this case, Spencer's wife was the perfect candidate. After this revelation, Spencer hastens his pursuit after Joe who activates Project Vulture before Spencer reaches him. Magdalene tries to stall Super Joe, now in a Bio-Mech suit, but she is killed while Spencer is forced to helplessly watch. In a fierce mid-air battle, Spencer kills Joe and ultimately stops Project Vulture. He falls back into the hole of The Vault from which he, Joe and the vultures had ascended earlier.

In the epilogue a brief conversation in Morse code is shown between the sniper (Thomas Clarke) who'd been following Spencer, and an unknown party. The first message reports that the Vault had been occupied and the Vulture Sentry System had been "disabled" before requesting further instructions. While the coded reply was not decrypted from Morse code for the audience (encrypted message is in German once decrypted), it apparently reveals the following declaration in response: "Execution of Phase Two Prepared. Activate Project Albatros [sic]."

== Development ==
A comic book tie-in was written by Andy Diggle, with Colin Wilson providing the art. In the weeks leading up to the title's release, every Wednesday a new page was posted on the game's website. These single pages were collected in a thirty-five page comic, which was offered as a bonus for pre-ordering the title. After the game's release, a monthly comic was published by Devil's Due Publishing. Players can also use a code found in Bionic Commando: Rearmed to unlock a skin of "RAD" Spencer from the original game with short red hair, green blazer and converse like shoes. A similar unlock, the 'Prototype Weapon,' was also available via BCR.

Capcom's Keiji Inafune described the working relationship with Grin as "messed up", a situation which had arisen in previous instances of collaborations between Japanese and western developers. Similarly Capcom president Haruhiro Tsujimoto stated: "Our experience with Bionic Commando has demonstrated the difficulty of outsourcing the development of new title to overseas companies".

=== Audio ===
The soundtrack for the game was generally well received. Kotaku described it as "suitably epic as well, with classic Bionic Commando music remixed into the sort of score you'd expect from a big-budget action flick." Also available is the single metal remix, "The Bionic Jam", created by artist vertexguy (Chris Kline). This appeared as a bonus track in the first mission, playing on a radio sitting on top a desk.

== Limited edition ==
Customers who pre-ordered Bionic Commando from GameCrazy had a chance of winning a limited number of '80s-style metal lunchboxes. In Australia, anyone who pre-ordered the game received a Nathan Spencer figure by NECA.

== Reception ==
Reception

Aggregate score
Aggregator	Score
Metacritic	(PS3) 71/100 (X360) 70/100 (PC) 69/100

Review scores
Publication	Score
Destructoid	5/10
Eurogamer	7/10
Famitsu	34/40; 34/40
Game Informer	6.25/10 (PS3/360)
GamePro	4/5 (PS3)
GameRevolution	B
GameSpot	5.5/10; 6/10
GameSpy	2/5 (PC); 3/5 (PS3); 3/5 (360)
GameTrailers	7.7/10
Giant Bomb	4/5
IGN	7.5/10; 8/10 (UK) 7/10
Official Xbox Magazine (US)	8/10
PC Gamer (UK)	74%
PlayStation: The Official Magazine	2.5/5
The Daily Telegraph	7/10
The Guardian	3/5

Bionic Commando received "average" reviews on all platforms according to the review aggregation website Metacritic. IGN praised the visuals and unpredictable storyline of the PlayStation 3 and Xbox 360 versions. GameSpot said of both console versions, "Bionic Commando has some enjoyable moments, but consistent fun always seems just out of arm's reach." In Japan, Famitsu gave both console versions a favorable review, giving each a score of 34 out of 40.

The A.V. Club gave the PS3 version an A− and said, "As you squeeze off headshots and sail around the stunningly rendered destroyed city, the game's only hiccup is in forcing you to read fine-print-sized text about the game's optional mythology. But don't let a little reading stop you from enjoying what's essentially a playable action movie." The Daily Telegraph gave the Xbox 360 version seven out of ten and said, "Irritations aside, there's rarely a dull moment and a delightfully ludicrous storyline with high-camp villains frames the action nicely. As such, Bionic Commando at its best is a macho, cheeseball 80s action movie that Arnie or Sly would have been proud of." The Guardian gave the PS3 and Xbox 360 versions three stars out of five and said that the game "looks good, but feels generally soulless and generic. Hardcore gamers will like the advanced difficulty level, but novices will find it infuriating. A damp squib of a revival." Edge gave the Xbox 360 version a score of six out of ten and said, "The overriding impression is of a game that's physically too big for its action." However, Wired gave the Xbox 360 version a score of five stars out of ten, saying that its concepts "are strong, but the moment-to-moment action just doesn't deliver on the promise of how awesome it would be to have a grappling hook instead of a hand."

Bionic Commando sold 27,000 units in the U.S., during its first month. In comparison, Terminator Salvation, which received worse reviews from critics, sold 43,000 units in the same length of time. VideoGamer.com's James Orry noted that the game "could end up being Capcom's first major flop in the high definition era." Grin shut down several months after launch, citing cash flow issues. As of June 30, 2022, the game has sold 1.30 million copies worldwide.
