= Roc'n Rope =

1983 video game

- European arcade flyer
- Developer: Konami
- Publishers: JP: Konami; NA: Interlogic; Coleco (ports)
- Designer: Tokuro Fujiwara
- Platforms: Arcade, Atari 2600, ColecoVision
- Release: Arcade: JP: March 3, 1983; WW: April 1983; 2600, ColecoVision; 1984
- Genre: Platform
- Modes: Single-player, multiplayer

Roc'n Rope (Note: Japanese: ロックンロープ, Hepburn: Rokkun Rōpu) (written as Roc 'N Rope on the American flyer and in Konami Arcade Classics) is a 1983 platform video game developed and published by Konami for arcades. It was designed by Tokuro Fujiwara, later known for his career at Capcom. The player controls a flashlight and harpoon-gun equipped archaeologist who must ascend a series of rocky platforms to reach a phoenix bird. Coleco released versions of Roc'n Rope for the Atari 2600 and ColecoVision in 1984.

Hamster Corporation released the game as part of their Arcade Archives series for the Nintendo Switch and PlayStation 4, as well as their Arcade Archives 2 series for the Nintendo Switch 2, PlayStation 5 and Xbox Series X/S in December 2025.

== Gameplay ==
Gameplay screenshot

The player has to avoid ferocious man-sized dinosaurs and red-haired cavemen without any direct means of offense. The only ways to defeat the opponents are to either daze them with the flashlight, or wait for them to be suspended on a harpoon rope and cause them fall down, an element which adds a certain complexity to the game. Bonus items to collect include fallen phoenix feathers and phoenix eggs, which grant the player invulnerability from the prehistoric denizens for a short period of time.

== Reception ==
Roc'n Rope was among Konami's early arcade hits, including Scramble (1981), Frogger (1981), and Yie Ar Kung-Fu (1984).

== Legacy ==
Roc'n Rope was the first "wire action" game. It became the basis for Capcom's 1987 game Bionic Commando, which Tokuro Fujiwara intended to be an expanded version of Roc'n Rope.
