= Bionic Commando =

Video game series

- In-game logo (NES)
- Genres: Platform, Run and gun
- Developers: Capcom; Nintendo Software Technology
- Publishers: Capcom; Nintendo
- Creator: Tokuro Fujiwara
- Composers: Harumi Fujita (Arcade); Junko Tamiya (NES); Tim Follin (C64, Amiga, Spectrum, ST)
- Platforms: Arcade, NES, Game Boy, Game Boy Color, Amiga, Atari ST, Commodore 64, Amstrad CPC, MS-DOS, ZX Spectrum, PlayStation Network, Xbox Live Arcade, Nvidia Shield, Windows
- First release: Bionic Commando; March 20, 1987
- Latest release: Bionic Commando Rearmed 2 February 1, 2011

Bionic Commando is a series of platform video games developed and owned by Capcom. Unique from other platformers, the player character is unable to jump, instead using a bionic arm to cross gaps and climb ledges. The player character, Nathan "Rad" Spencer, uses this as a grappling gun/hook to swing, climb and descend through levels. Seven games have been released, from the original 1987 Bionic Commando to 2011's Bionic Commando Rearmed 2. The series is based in an alternate timeline in which Nazism is not completely eradicated following World War II.

== Gameplay ==
The protagonist's bionic arm is a core gameplay element in the series. It is used for traversal and combat.

The Bionic Commando titles share core gameplay elements that pertain to the use of protagonist Nathan "Rad" Spencer's bionic arm, which is used as a grappling gun/hook to swing, climb and descend through levels. It is also used during combat to pull towards or push away enemies. Beginning with Bionic Commando in 2009, the developers gave Spencer a simple jump mechanic that works in conjunction with the bionic arm gameplay. Before, Spencer was unable to jump as a gameplay mechanic. Spencer was also able to jump in the follow-up title Bionic Commando Rearmed 2

All games except 2009's Bionic Commando are played from a 2D perspective; the game is played primarily from a side-view perspective as and action platform game, though some sequences are played in a top-down view. With the 2009 iteration the game was given full 3D exploration, with perspective being over the shoulder. In addition to the arc of Spencer's swing, the player can control left-right sway of the swing to adjust for targets. For the Rearmed entries the games are rendered in 3D but gameplay is still restricted to a 2D plane, making these 2.5D platform games.

== Setting ==
The Bionic Commando universe is set in a timeline in which Nazism is not completely eradicated following World War II. While fascist undertones were present in the 1987 game, it was not until the 1988 game's appearance on the Famicom and NES that these became more apparent. The Empire in the Japanese version was actually a neo-Nazi nation and the Imperial Army's insignia was a Nazi Swastika with a thunderbolt behind it. In the English version, the Nazis are referred as the "Badds", though the backstory in the manual refers to them as the "Nazz". The Imperial Army's Swastika insignia was changed into a new one resembling an eagle; and the leader of the villains, originally called Weizmann in the Japanese version, was renamed Killt, although the soldiers and characters keep their same Nazi-like appearance. The difficulty of the game was rebalanced and some of the areas were made less difficult. One of the most prominent differences is the identity of the ultimate antagonist of the game, who is meant to be a revived Adolf Hitler in the Japanese version. For the English version, the character was renamed "Master-D"; however, his appearance remained the same. There is a gory ending sequence in which Hitler's face explodes, which was also kept intact in the English version. Later games expanded on this alternate timeline and the fallout from the fascist regime toppling. Spencer goes on to confront terrorist groups and dictators.

== Games ==
Bionic Commando
1987	Bionic Commando (Arcade/Home computer)
1988	Bionic Commando (Famicom/NES)
1989
1990
1991
1992	Bionic Commando (Game Boy)
1993
1994
1995
1996
1997
1998
1999
2000	Bionic Commando: Elite Forces
2001
2002
2003
2004
2005
2006
2007
2008	Bionic Commando Rearmed
2009	Bionic Commando (PS3/X360/WIN)
2010
2011	Bionic Commando Rearmed 2

The original Japanese arcade game and its Famicom counterpart (Hitler's Resurrection) are called Top Secret (Japanese: トップシークレット,, Hepburn: Toppu Shīkuretto). The original arcade game was advertised in the United States as a sequel to Commando, going as far to refer to the game's main character as Super Joe (the protagonist of Commando) in the promotional brochure, who was originally an unnamed member of a "special commando unit" in the Japanese and World versions. In 1988, Capcom produced a home version for the Nintendo Entertainment System, also titled Bionic Commando, that was drastically different from the original arcade game. A version much truer to the coin-op original was released for the Amiga (OCS) in 1988; it was also ported to the other leading micros: the Atari ST, Commodore 64, Amstrad CPC and ZX Spectrum. They were "wire action" games created by Tokuro Fujiwara, based on his earlier 1983 arcade game Roc'n Rope. He originally intended Bionic Commando to be an expanded version of its predecessor Roc'n Rope. The music for the original arcade game was developed by Harumi Fujita, a member of the then all-female Capcom Sound Team. Fellow female video game composer Junko Tamiya adapted two of the original arcade tracks (The "Bionic Commando Theme" and "The Powerplant") and expanded the soundtrack by adding several new songs in the console versions for the Japanese Famicom and the NES ports of the game.

An adaptation of Bionic Commando for the Game Boy was released in 1992. There was also an MSdos/386 version of the game available circa 1991. A sequel, Bionic Commando: Elite Forces, was released in 1999 for the Game Boy Color. Though it borrows some elements from its predecessors, Elite Forces has a different plot from the rest of the series. Also, the characters (an unnamed male or female commando) have a few more moves, such as the ability to climb down from platforms, and can also utilize a sniper rifle in some segments to eliminate distant enemies. An enhanced remake of the 1988 NES version was developed by Grin and published by Capcom for Microsoft Windows, PlayStation Network, and Xbox Live Arcade and was released on August 13, 2008, under the name, Bionic Commando Rearmed (バイオニック コマンドー マスターD復活計画, Bionic Commando: Master D Resurrection Project in Japan). The remake serves as a prelude to the 2009 video game Bionic Commando. A sequel, Bionic Commando Rearmed 2, was released in February 2011.

In November 2015, Capcom released the five-disc Senjo no Okami & Top Secret Original Sound Collection (戦場の狼&トップシークレットオリジナルサウンドコレクション) It included the soundtrack from all the classic games from those two series. Manami Matsumae wrote the liner notes. Spencer appears as a playable character in the crossover fighting games Marvel vs. Capcom 3: Fate of Two Worlds, Ultimate Marvel vs. Capcom 3 and Marvel vs. Capcom: Infinite, sporting his look from the 2009 game. Dameon Clarke provided his voice.
