= Disney's Hide and Sneak =

2003 video game

- North American cover art
- Developer: Capcom
- Publisher: Capcom
- Directors: Mitsure Endo; Makoto Ikehara
- Producer: Hironobu Takeshita
- Designers: Tomokazu Kadoue; Makoto Fukui
- Programmer: Takayuki Umezu
- Artist: Christopher K. Tellez
- Composers: Yuko Koniyama; Seiko Kobuchi
- Platform: GameCube
- Release: NA: November 18, 2003; JP: December 4, 2003; PAL: March 19, 2004
- Genre: Action-adventure
- Mode: Single-player

Disney's Hide and Sneak (Note: Known in Japan as Mickey & Minnie: Trick & Chase (Japanese: ミッキー＆ミニー トリック＆チェイス, Hepburn: Mikkī & Minī Torikku & Cheisu)) is an action-adventure game released in 2003 by Capcom for the GameCube. It follows Mickey Mouse and his girlfriend Minnie Mouse as they fight their way through an army of UFO-shaped aliens and rescue the other from a mushroom-shaped alien named Lu-Lu.

== Plot ==
The story begins with a small alien named Lu-Lu floating around in space, getting hit by a meteor, and falling to Earth. Mickey and Minnie Mouse then discover Lu-Lu while having a picnic. At first, they think its a mushroom, but then Minnie (if the player is playing as Mickey) or Mickey (if the player is playing as Minnie) climbs on them and poses. Lu-Lu then floats away with the other mouse still standing on it. It is up to the player character to go after them and find them. Towards the end of the game, Mickey and Minnie finally help Lu-Lu summon a giant alien space ship. Lu-Lu floats up along the tractor beam of the ship, and Mickey and Minnie say good bye to her as she flies back home to outer space in the ship.

== Reception ==
Reception

Aggregate score
Aggregator	Score
Metacritic	48/100

Review scores
Publication	Score
1Up.com	C+
Famitsu	26/40
Game Informer	3.5/10
GamesMaster	30%
IGN	4.8/10
NGC Magazine	25%
Nintendo Power	2.8/5
Nintendo World Report	4/10

The game received "generally unfavorable" reviews according to the review aggregation website Metacritic. In Japan, Famitsu gave it a score of 26 out of 40. IGN gave the game a 4.8 out of 10, writing, "just as bad and boring as Magical Mirror".

== See also ==
- Disney's Magical Mirror Starring Mickey Mouse
- List of Disney video games
