= Dark Void =

2010 video game

- Developer: Airtight Games
- Publisher: Capcom
- Producer: Jim Deal Jeff Combos
- Designer: Jose Perez III Jason Lamparty
- Programmer: Michael Bowman
- Writer: Jeffrey Howell
- Composer: Bear McCreary
- Engine: Unreal Engine 3
- Platforms: Microsoft Windows, PlayStation 3, Xbox 360
- Release: NA: January 19, 2010; AU: January 21, 2010; EU: January 22, 2010; AU: 2010 (PC)
- Genres: Third-person shooter, action-adventure
- Mode: Single-player

Dark Void is a 2010 third-person shooter game developed by Airtight Games and published by Capcom. In the game, players must face an alien threat that humanity had previously banished. It was released for PlayStation 3, Windows, and Xbox 360 in January 2010. It received mixed reviews from critics.

== Gameplay ==
The games make use of a unique "vertical cover system", as well as a standard cover system. The game includes a hover pack, and later, a jetpack, allowing for a quick transition between traditional shooter gameplay and flight. Everything unlocked in the first play through is transferred over to any new play throughs. Upgrades are purchased using Tech points through a shop at the start of every level before gameplay begins. Tech points are collected from defeated enemies and are hidden throughout the level.

== Plot ==
The game's story takes place before World War II and centers around a cargo pilot named William Augustus Grey (voiced by Nolan North) who is teleported to another world while flying through the Bermuda Triangle. In this world, known as the "Void", Will encounters an alien race as well as other humans, which are known as the Watchers and the Survivors respectively. Will reluctantly joins the Survivors, who are engaged in a feud with the alien race, to satisfy his desire to return to Earth. While aiding the Survivors, Will discovers that the Void is a middle ground that connects both the Watchers' homeworld and Earth. It also becomes apparent that the Watchers are supplying the Axis powers with various wartime provisions for reasons unknown. With the help of Nikola Tesla, Will uses retrofitted Watcher technology to combat the Watchers and eventually find a way to escape the Void.

== Music ==
Bear McCreary, making his video game score debut, composed the score to Dark Void. He recorded the score with a 63-piece ensemble of the Hollywood Studio Symphony at the Eastwood Scoring Stage.

== Spin-off ==
A spin-off title for DSiWare called Dark Void Zero was released in North America on January 18, 2010 and in the PAL region on March 5, 2010. Setting it apart from the next-gen version, the game was designed as a retro title featuring 8-bit graphics and sound, with 2D gameplay in the same vein as the Metroid games. To promote the game, a history of the game was created in which it was a title Capcom was developing to be a breakthrough NES property in the late 80s, but was shelved with the discontinuation of the PlayChoice-10 and the coming of the SNES. This history also appears in-game during the introduction. Additionally, before starting the game, players must use the DSi microphone to blow the cartridge's "contacts", a homage to the age-old method of getting non-working NES games to play. Capcom manager Seth Killian said Dark Void Zero started development after finishing the pre-release copy of Dark Void, inspired by the 8-bit music McCreary provided for the ending credits. Dark Void Zero was also released for iOS and Windows platforms on April 12, 2010. Both versions have an all-new secret ending. The Steam version has an additional ending (for a total of three possible endings), Steam Achievements, online leaderboards, and a SecuROM 5 machine activation limit.

== Reception ==
Reception

Aggregate score
Aggregator	Score		
Aggregator	PC	PS3	Xbox 360
Metacritic	57/100	59/100	59/100

Review scores
Publication	Score		
Publication	PC	PS3	Xbox 360
Destructoid	N/A	N/A	3.5/10
Eurogamer	N/A	N/A	5/10
Game Informer	7/10	7/10	7/10
GamePro	N/A	N/A	3/5
GameRevolution	C−	C−	C−
GameSpot	6.5/10	6.5/10	6.5/10
GameSpy	3/5	3/5	3/5
GameTrailers	N/A	N/A	6.8/10
GameZone	N/A	6/10	6/10
Giant Bomb	N/A	N/A	3/5
IGN	5/10	5/10	5/10
Official Xbox Magazine (US)	N/A	N/A	6.5/10
PC Gamer (US)	30%	N/A	N/A
PlayStation: The Official Magazine	N/A	4/5	N/A
The Daily Telegraph	N/A	N/A	5/10
Wired	N/A	4/10	4/10

Dark Void received "mixed or average" reviews from critics, according to review aggregator website Metacritic.

IGN said, "Dark Void is one of those games you'll play, beat, and forget ever existed." Game Informer said that "the shining strengths of the game are buried underneath a thick layer of rust that only the thirstiest of air-junkies should bother chipping through."

GameZone's Louis Bedigian said of the PS3 and Xbox 360 versions, "The generic Gears of War-style shooting is forgivable. But the countless technical problems all but destroy a game that had the potential to be something truly special. Dark Void can be summed up in just six words: so much potential, so much disappointment." Hardcore Gamer praised the innovative jet pack but stated that the game "winds up being less than the sum of its parts," and that Dark Void is "not something you need to have in your collection."

Edge gave the Xbox 360 version a score of six out of ten and said, "Somehow, Dark Void just about rises above its faults, but it's hardly at risk of flying too close to the sun." 411Mania gave the PS3 version a score of 5.2 out of 10 and said, "It is sad to say but there really isn't much of a fun factor here. If you are a fan of getting as much trophies as possible, then I can see some fun in this game. There are plenty of trophies to be earned here and a lot of them are very easy to get. I think for people enjoy flying simulators or any type of flying game for that matter might enjoy this a bit more than I did. The story is a bit too spotty, the characters don't seem very important and the game is just very forgettable after you beat it." The Daily Telegraph gave the Xbox 360 version five out of ten and called it "a game we wanted to like more than we did. Its retro sci-fi concept is so appealing it initially makes it tempting to excuse some of the game's rougher edges. In the end, however, no amount of nostalgia can absolve the game of its ropy gameplay, patchy plot, substandard production, generic (and sometimes poor) level design and thin content; the campaign takes around eight hours to complete and that's the only mode on offer." Wired gave the PS3 and Xbox 360 versions four stars out of ten, saying, "Even though some stages (like the penultimate aerial battle) felt like they lasted forever and ever, Dark Void is a pretty short game with an anticlimactic ending that does little more than set up a sequel." The A.V. Club gave the PS3 version a D and called it "an exercise in diminishing returns—what at first seems new and fun eventually becomes dully predictable, and having to mash buttons to secure your grip only adds to the snarling annoyances."
