= Bionic Commando (1992 video game) =

Platform video game

- North American cover art
- Developer: Minakuchi Engineering
- Publisher: Capcom
- Series: Bionic Commando
- Platform: Game Boy
- Release: JP: July 24, 1992; NA: September 19, 1992; EU: 1992
- Genre: Platform
- Mode: Single-player

Bionic Commando (Note: Japanese: バイオニック コマンドー) is a 1992 platform video game developed by Minakuchi Engineering and published by Capcom for the Game Boy. It is an adaptation of the Nintendo Entertainment System version of Bionic Commando, changing the present-day setting of the NES version into a futuristic science fiction one.

The game has been re-released via the Nintendo 3DS Virtual Console service in 2011 and the Nintendo Classics service in November 2025.

== Plot ==
Image from the Game Boy game

The Game Boy version follows the same plot as the NES version, changing the present-day setting of the NES version into a futuristic one. The player takes the role of Rad Spencer (Ladd in the original NES version), an agent of the FF Corps (the FF Battalion in the NES version), whose mission is to rescue his ally Super Joe from the Doraize Army and prevent their leader, Director Wiseman (named after the Weizmann character from the Japanese Famicom game, who was renamed Killt in the NES localization), from the Doraize Army's secret project codenamed Albatross.

This version also shifts the military theme present in the original to a more sci-fi territory. The uniforms and helmets of the enemies are changed for futuristic armors and "spiky" hair. This version also adds a more modern cinema-like opening and ending sequences. These sequences and character drawings in the in-game dialogues, making the Game Boy version more story oriented.

== Gameplay ==
Like the NES version, the player must navigate through the overworld map to move from level to level with a transport helicopter, called "DX-3 Turbocopter". A difference from the NES version are the player's encounters with enemy transport vehicles. While on the NES version, these encounters featured a top-down interface, on the Game Boy version, they remain side-scrolling like the rest of the game.
