= Bionic Commando Rearmed =

2008 video game remake

- Developers: Grin; Beeline Interactive (BB)
- Publishers: Capcom; Beeline Interactive (BB)
- Director: Simon Viklund
- Producer: Ben Judd
- Designer: Arvid Nilsson
- Programmer: Hakan Rasmussen
- Artist: Arvid Nilsson
- Composer: Simon Viklund
- Series: Bionic Commando
- Engine: Diesel Engine
- Platforms: Microsoft Windows, PlayStation 3, Xbox 360, BlackBerry, J2ME
- Release: PSN: JP: August 13, 2008; NA: August 14, 2008; PAL: August 28, 2008; PC, XBLA; August 13, 2008; BlackBerry; April 23, 2009
- Genres: Platform game, Metroidvania
- Modes: Single-player, multiplayer

Bionic Commando Rearmed is an enhanced remake of the 1988 Nintendo Entertainment System version of Bionic Commando. It was developed by Grin and published by Capcom for Microsoft Windows, PlayStation Network, and Xbox Live Arcade, and was released in August 2008. The BlackBerry version was developed and published by Beeline Interactive and released on April 23, 2009. The remake serves as a prelude to the 2009 video game Bionic Commando.

Rearmed follows Nathan "Rad" Spencer, a commando with a bionic left arm that can extend and be used as a weapon, or to swing from various objects. Spencer is sent to destroy a weapon known as the Albatross project under construction by the Badds. The game was developed using Grin's Diesel engine and features in-game art by Shinkiro. Music for the game was composed by Simon Viklund and consists largely of remixed versions of the original music. The soundtrack was released on May 27, 2008 by Sumthing Else Music Works.

Rearmed was well-received by critics, who praised the updated gameplay, graphics and faithfulness to the original, with some calling it one of the best downloadable games available on the Xbox Live Arcade and PlayStation Network. A sequel, Bionic Commando Rearmed 2, was released in February 2011.

== Synopsis ==
Bionic Commando Rearmed borrows its plot largely from the NES version of the game. In keeping with the North American release of that version, the references to the Nazi party found in the original Japanese title are not featured in Rearmed. However, as is the case in the original, the final boss of the game resembles Adolf Hitler, and is referred to as "The Leader".

Rearmed centers around two warring factions: the Federation and the Empire. It begins with the Imperial forces discovering classified documents regarding the development of a secret weapon known as the Albatross project, originally started by an organization known as the Badds, but never completed. Killt, Generalissimo of the Empire's forces, decides to complete the project himself. When the Federation learns of the Empire's plot, they send in their national hero, Super Joe to infiltrate the Empire. During his mission, Joe is captured by Imperial forces. The Federation sends in a second operative named Nathan Spencer to rescue Super Joe and assist him in completing his mission.

Spencer traverses several areas, eliminating many Imperial leaders along his way. As he progresses, he finds new technology and travels deeper behind enemy lines. The plot culminates as Super Joe is rescued from the bionic Imperial soldier Gottfried Groeder, and both Spencer and Joe set out to destroy the Albatross project. During the mission, Spencer encounters "The Leader", the resurrected head of the Imperial forces. Spencer defeats The Leader, and together with Super Joe destroys the Albatross. The game ends with both heroes hanging onto a helicopter, flying off as the Albatross explodes.

== Gameplay ==
Bionic Commando Rearmed retains the two-dimensional gameplay of the original while receiving enhanced three-dimensional graphics.

In Bionic Commando Rearmed, the player controls Nathan Spencer, a soldier who has been given a bionic arm. The arm is equipped with several features including a grappling hook which can be used to reach distant objects. The player uses Spencer's bionic arm to swing across gaps or climb to higher ledges. Often, the player must make a series of grappling actions in a row to successfully traverse hazards such as a wide gap or an electrified floor.

Spencer earns a variety of weaponry and items by defeating level bosses. Some items and weapons must be acquired before certain areas can be entered: for example, the player must locate flares that can then be used to illuminate dark areas. Levels are presented to the player as an overworld-style tactical map showing friendly and enemy areas. The player controls a helicopter to move between areas, and can then select to infiltrate that area on foot. While in the overworld view, enemy convoys will also move between areas. If the player's helicopter encounters a convoy, the player must fight through it on foot and destroy the enemy anti-air truck before the helicopter can proceed. Such levels are presented from a top-down perspective.

While Bionic Commando Rearmed remains mostly true to its NES counterpart, a number of gameplay enhancements were made. A health bar replaces the game's original health system of a limited health pool which grows after collecting bullets from defeated foes. Players collect health items from enemies to restore health, as opposed to the original system which involved earning more hit points. Defeating enemies with full health now awards players extra points, encouraging players to avoid being hit in order to obtain high scores. Players can extend Spencer's bionic arm to grab oil barrels and throw them at enemies, or use them as temporary shields. Weapons can now be changed instantly during gameplay, as opposed to being limited to one weapon per mission. Boss battles have also been redesigned. Each battle now makes unique use of Spencer's weaponry and bionic arm. In one example, the player must latch the arm to a screw on the boss character's vehicle, then pull back to expose a weak point in the armor. Additionally, the final boss battle has been extended to a complete level as opposed to the ending sequence of one. Hacking into enemy communications now involves navigating a three-dimensional puzzle as opposed to simply choosing to hack. New to the remake are Challenge rooms which involve using the bionic arm to traverse a course as quickly as possible. Force feedback has been implemented when using the bionic arm, firing weapons, and other events.

=== Multiplayer ===
Rearmed's campaign can be played locally with another player. Although the overall gameplay is identical, enemy AI adapts difficulty to accommodate the extra player. Character lives are shared between players, meaning that each player life lost hurts both players. Once all extra lives are depleted and a player dies, the AI reverts to its single player configuration for the remaining player until that player completes the level or an extra life is found. Additionally the cooperative campaign is saved separately from the solo campaign, meaning that weapons, equipment, and powerups do not carry over from one campaign into the other. During play, the game's camera will zoom in and out to accommodate both players, and will split the screen dynamically should the camera not be able to zoom any further. Competitive multiplayer modes have also been added, and can be played locally. Game modes include the standard versus and last man standing modes, and Don't Touch the Floor, in which characters attempt to knock other players to a hazard at the bottom of the level for points.

== Development and marketing ==
Bionic Commando Rearmed developer Grin made it a priority to preserve as much of the original gameplay and visual stylings as possible. Screenshots were taken as a reference, with designers keeping the same color schemes when creating the 3D worlds. Programmers had to reverse engineer the original gameplay to accurately reproduce it. They had to "measure how fast the arm goes out, how fast you swing back and forth, how fast you run across the ground, at what speed you fall down and everything," said Simon Viklund, Creative Director for the game. The level editor was integrated in the engine, which allowed developers to view creations in real time. Lead Gameplay Programmer Håkan Rasmussen expanded on this concept, stating "Since BCR is built on the same engine as the next-gen BC we can also reuse the editor [which] lowers the time before we can start using levels."

Developers found that adjusting the original gameplay to a 3D engine required dismissal of conventional physics. For example, the player cannot walk past a barrel placed in their way, however they are able to swing through the object. "The swing mechanic [is] based on the original [and so is] totally physically incorrect," noted Gameplay Programmer Bertil Hörberg. Hörberg stated that the character always swings at the same speed and releases at the same angle regardless of player input. Weapons were also redesigned, with each weapon being rebalanced. "In the original [players get] the rocket launcher and [use it] for the rest of the game" stated Viklund. All of the weapons were redesigned to be useful in some form, and can now all be taken into combat, whereas previously only one weapon could be selected per area. Boss characters received not only a visual redesign, but the fights were redesigned as well to make use of Spencer's bionic abilities and weaponry. Viklund noted players "need to use the arm to beat the boss".

Challenge rooms were born of a desire to enhance the game's neutral zones. "The neutral zones in the original game weren't that interesting, so I starting thinking we could add an obstacle course in each one", Viklund said. "The bionic arm is such an unconventional mechanic that we really wanted to explore everything that it could offer", added Level Designer Viktor Viklund. Viktor Viklund cited inspiration from several NES games, including Solomon's Key, Wrecking Crew, and Ice Climber, adding that the concept was "very basic, very short stages." The game's soundtrack consists of remix versions of the original NES tracks, arranged by Simon Viklund. He described the arrangements as "the same melodies and harmonies but with a more modern sound."

Character art for in-game cutscenes were illustrated by Capcom artist Shinkiro.

In redesigning the game's protagonist, Nathan Spencer, Grin cited the characters Iceman from the movie Top Gun and Marty McFly from the Back to the Future series as visual influences in the update. For the character Super Joe, designers looked to the cowboys of the American Old West, citing actor Sam Elliott as an additional source of inspiration. 3D artists noticed early in development that due to the far distance of the camera, certain details in textures would not be noticeable. "We had to think 'less detail and more color [and] bigger shapes,'" stated 3D Artists Wendy Young and Peter Stråhle. All of the 2D character art was designed by Shinkiro, an illustrator and conceptual artist, famous for his work with the Art of Fighting and The King of Fighters series.

Bionic Commando Rearmed - The Soundtrack is the soundtrack of video game music from Bionic Commando Rearmed. It was released on May 27, 2008 by Sumthing Else Music Works. The music was composed by Simon Viklund, who later provided the arranged soundtrack for Final Fight: Double Impact. The music is largely remixed from the original game. Viklund took the original tracks written by Junko Tamiya and rearranged them in Buzz, a freeware virtual studio program. A Japanese trailer for the game was revealed at San Diego Comic-con 2008, done in the style of an anime opening with a theme song sung by Ichirou Mizuki, titled "Go Go Bionic".

On February 19, 2008 the official Bionic Commando website ran a poll asking gamers to decide between two possible prices for Rearmed —ten or fifteen dollars. Producer Ben Judd stated, "Personally, since the goal is to make this game for the fans and to get the world to see what makes Bionic Commando so special, I want to sell it for about US$10." However, more senior Capcom employees believed that the game had enough features and polish to sell well enough at US15 to warrant that price. Final pricing was settled on US10 for the Xbox Live Arcade and PlayStation Network versions, and US15 for the Windows version. The PlayStation 3 version supports Remote Play on PlayStation Portable and trophies.

== Sales ==
Rearmed sold over 130,000 copies across all three platforms during the first week of its release. As of year-end 2010, Bionic Commando Rearmed has sold over 113,000 copies on Xbox Live alone. That number rose to over 119,000 at year-end 2011.

== Reception ==
Reception

Aggregate score
Aggregator	Score		
Aggregator	PC	PS3	Xbox 360
Metacritic	86/100	87/100	85/100

Review scores
Publication	Score		
Publication	PC	PS3	Xbox 360
Destructoid	N/A	N/A	8.5/10
Edge	N/A	8/10	N/A
Eurogamer	N/A	N/A	8/10
GamePro	N/A	4/5	4/5
GameRevolution	N/A	N/A	B
GameSpot	N/A	8/10	7.5/10
GameTrailers	N/A	N/A	8.8/10
GameZone	N/A	N/A	9.5/10
Giant Bomb	5/5	5/5	5/5
IGN	9.3/10	9.4/10	9.4/10
Official Xbox Magazine (US)	N/A	N/A	7/10
PC Gamer (US)	70%	N/A	N/A
411Mania	N/A	9.6/10	9.5/10
Wired	9/10	9/10	9/10

Bionic Commando Rearmed received "generally favorable reviews" on all platforms according to the review aggregation website Metacritic.

In an October 2011 ranking, IGN listed Bionic Commando Rearmed fourth in their top twenty-five Xbox Live Arcade titles of all time. Overall impressions of the game gleaned comments of praise. IGN's Hilary Goldstein called Rearmed "the best downloadable game to date on XBLA and PSN", and Cam Shea ranked it second on his top 10 list of Xbox Live Arcade games. Jeff Gerstmann of Giant Bomb called it "terrific in almost every way" and the reviewer from GameTrailers stated it was "one of those games that feels organic to play." Reviewers praised the title's ability to remain true to the NES version but provide enhancements to update the title.

The game's graphics received high marks from reviews. Goldstein described as "gorgeous" and added that Rearmed is "one of the prettiest downloadable games ever made." Gerstmann also lauded the visuals and praised the color palette, backgrounds and lighting. He further noted the game's ability to remain loyal to the original visual presentation. "[It] makes enough visual references to the old game to trigger that feeling of nostalgia, but it never uses the old stuff as a crutch," stated Gerstmann. Similar praise was given in respect to the game's soundtrack, with 1UP.com's Jeremy Parish calling it "exceptional" and "a mix good enough to enjoy outside the context of the game". Stephen Woodward of GameZone also gave praise for the remixed music in the Xbox 360 version. He called it "simultaneously retro and hip."

Reviewers were split on opinions of the game's AI, with IGN's Goldstein describing it as "the best seen in a side-scrolling game", but Tom McShea of GameSpot saying the enemies were "simply too limited to pose much of a threat". Multiple reviewers were disappointed in the game controls, citing the lack of updating to analog features and remaining too true to the original. Rearmed's multiplayer received generally high acclaim, with McShea calling it "an unexpected treat". Both the game's cooperative and competitive modes were lauded; however, some critics cited a lack of online functionality. Parish also praised the game's challenge maps and in-game database, stating "Rearmed is a game that could easily sell for full retail price and seem like a good deal."

== Sequel ==
Bionic Commando Rearmed 2 was revealed at Capcom's Captivate 2010 event. It was developed by Fatshark and released on the PlayStation 3 via the PlayStation Network and the Xbox 360 via Xbox Live Arcade on February 1, 2011 and February 2, 2011, respectively. The game adds new weapons and abilities, including the optional ability to jump, a maneuver absent in previous 2D titles. The sequel's plot revolves around a dictator named General Sabio and a missing commander from Spencer's organization, Colonel Brubaker. Spencer and a team of four other bionics are sent to locate Brubaker and his platoon and help them complete their mission of disarming Sabio's missiles. Rearmed 2 was not as well received as the original game. The PlayStation 3 version of the game was criticized for its DRM requirement to be signed into the PlayStation Network in order to play the game.
