= Bionic Commando (1987 video game) =

Platform video game

- Arcade flyer
- Developers: Capcom; Software Creations (UK C64)
- Publishers: Capcom: Arcade; WW: Capcom; UK: Electrocoin Ports Go! (U.S. Gold)
- Designer: Tokuro Fujiwara
- Composer: Harumi Fujita
- Series: Bionic Commando
- Platforms: Arcade, Amiga, Amstrad CPC, Atari ST, Commodore 64, MS-DOS, ZX Spectrum
- Release: JP: March 1987; NA: June 1987; EU: 1987
- Genres: Run and gun, platform
- Modes: Single-player, multiplayer

Bionic Commando, released in Japan as Top Secret (Note: Japanese: トップシークレット, Hepburn: Toppu Shīkuretto) is a 1987 run and gun platform video game developed and published by Capcom for arcades. It was designed by Tokuro Fujiwara as a successor to his earlier "wire action" platformer Roc'n Rope (1983), building on its grappling hook mechanic; he was also the designer of Commando (1985). The music was composed by Harumi Fujita for the Yamaha YM2151 sound chip. It is the first installment of the Bionic Commando series.

The game was advertised in the United States as a sequel to Commando, going as far as to refer to the game's main character as Super Joe (the protagonist of Commando) in the promotional brochure, who was originally an unnamed member of a "special commando unit" in the Japanese and international versions.

The protagonist is a commando equipped with a bionic arm featuring a grappling gun, allowing him to pull himself forward or swing from the ceiling. Despite being a platform game, the player cannot jump. To cross gaps or climb ledges, the hero must use the bionic arm.

It was later released for several home systems (ported by Software Creations and published by Go!). Capcom later produced a home version for the Nintendo Entertainment System, also titled Bionic Commando, that was drastically different from the arcade game.

== Plot ==
The story takes place ten years after an unspecified World War between two warring factions. The game follows a commando who must infiltrate an enemy base and foil the enemy's plot to launch missiles by destroying the launch computer. The player then fights the final boss, the leader of the enemy forces, protected by armed bodyguards.

== Gameplay ==
The game is presented in a side-scrolling format, with eight-way scrolling. Unlike most platform games, the player is unable to jump, instead navigating the level via the use of a mechanical arm that can be used as a grapple to pull him up ledges, collect power-ups and as an offensive weapon against enemies.

Prizes such as points and power-ups can only be obtained from crates that appear on the screen suspended from a parachute and are revealed by shooting them. Unlike most of the later games in the series, the player cannot use the arm and shoot at the same time, the arm cannot be used in the air and the only power-ups are weapon enhancements.

== Ports ==
There are home ports for MS-DOS, Amstrad CPC, Commodore 64, ZX Spectrum, Amiga, and Atari ST. For the Commodore 64, there are two distinct versions: a US version by Capcom, and a UK version by Software Creations. In some versions, there is an additional level between levels 3 and 4, featuring enemy helicopters. The UK home computer versions were published by U.S. Gold.

The music for the ZX Spectrum, Atari ST, Amiga, and Commodore 64 PAL conversion was arranged by Tim Follin, using a music driver programmed by Stephen Ruddy.

== Reception ==
Reception

Review scores
Publication	Score
Crash	92%
Computer and Video Games	9/10
Sinclair User	7/10
Your Sinclair	9/10
ACE	838/1000
Computer Entertainer	6.5/8 stars
The Games Machine	91%

Awards
Publication	Award
Golden Joystick Awards	Best 8-bit Soundtrack
Crash	Crash Smash

In Japan, Game Machine listed Bionic Commando on their April 15, 1987 issue as being the fifth most-successful table arcade unit of the month. U.S. Gold's release for home computers sold 70,000 copies in the United Kingdom by 1989, becoming their best-selling Capcom release up until then.

Home versions generally received average or decent reviews, apart from the ZX Spectrum version which was greeted by some critical praise, receiving ratings of 9/10 and 92% from Your Sinclair and CRASH.

The game was voted Best 8-bit Soundtrack of the Year at the Golden Joystick Awards.

Kurt Kalata of Hardcore Gaming 101 called Bionic Commando "totally brilliant" for how it replaces the jumping mechanics used in most platformer games with grappling mechanics, writing, "It necessitates almost entirely rewiring one’s brain in order to successfully play the game".

== Legacy ==
The world record high score for Bionic Commando was set in October 2007 by Rudy Chavez of Los Angeles, California. Chavez scored 2,251,090 points.

An emulation of the arcade version is included in Capcom Classics Collection Vol. 1 for PlayStation 2 and Xbox; and Capcom Classics Collection Remixed for PlayStation Portable.
