= Bionic Commando (1988 video game) =

Platform game

- North American box art
- Developer: Capcom
- Publisher: Capcom
- Designer: Hatchan
- Composer: Junko Tamiya
- Series: Bionic Commando
- Platform: Nintendo Entertainment System
- Release: JP: July 20, 1988; NA: December 1988; EU: October 26, 1990
- Genre: Platform
- Mode: Single-player

Bionic Commando, originally released as Hitler's Resurrection: Top Secret (Note: Japanese: ヒットラーの復活 TOP SECRET(トップシークレット), Hepburn: Hittorā no Fukkatsu: Toppu Shīkuretto) in Japan, is a 1988 platform game developed and published by Capcom for the Nintendo Entertainment System. It is based on the 1987 arcade game Bionic Commando.

As Ladd, a member of the FF Battalion, the player explores each stage and obtains the necessary equipment to progress. Ladd is equipped with a mechanical arm featuring a grappling gun, allowing him to pull himself forward or swing from the ceiling. As such, the series is one of few instances of a platformer in which the player cannot jump. To cross gaps or climb ledges, Ladd must use his bionic arm.

In the instruction manual, the character is only known as "Player". In the ending, his name is revealed as "Ladd". The Game Boy version, a retelling of this game, calls the character "Rad". In the Game Boy Color remake, the main character is unnamed. His full name of Nathan "Rad" Spencer was revealed in 2009's Bionic Commando for the Xbox 360 and PlayStation 3.

== Gameplay ==
Ladd cannot jump, so he uses his bionic arm to swing across gaps and obstacles.

Bionic Commando is a platformer in which the player controls Ladd, whose mission is to rescue Super Joe and to stop the Albatros project. The game begins on an overworld map, where, Starting at Area 0, the player can move Ladd's helicopter to any connected Area on the map in a nonlinear fashion. Each time Ladd's helicopter moves, the enemy ground vehicles will also move. Once the helicopter reaches its destination without crossing over the path of an enemy vehicle, the player can choose to "descend" upon that area or to "transfer" to a different Area. If the helicopter is intercepted by a vehicle, Ladd must engage the enemy in an overhead shooter level similar to Capcom's Commando. Ladd, armed with a weapon and his grappling hook that he can use to swing around in a circle to deflect bullets and enemies, must defeat the soldiers and make it to the end. These are the only stages where the player can earn a continue.

When Ladd descends into an Area, the player must select which equipment to bring, and is then dropped into a sidescrolling platforming level. There, the player is required to find one or multiple Communications Rooms and then proceed to each Area's Computer Room, where a boss will be guarding the computer core that must be destroyed to clear the Area. Since Ladd cannot jump, the player must use his weapons and bionic arm to defeat enemies and navigate platforms and obstacles. The player can extend his bionic arm overhead, directly in front, and above at a 45-degree angle, and can grapple to higher platforms, swing across chasms, and pick up items. Additional equipment such as weapons, protective gear, and communications devices can be discovered by clearing Areas or finding them in levels, some of which are vital to progressing further. In addition to the regular "combat areas", there are also safe "neutral areas", which are non-hostile zones where Ladd can gain more information from allied and enemy soldiers and find items. If Ladd fires his weapon in any neutral area, an alarm sounds, and all soldiers will become hostile.

== Plot ==
Bionic Commando takes place sometime in the late 1980s and centers on two warring states: the Federation and the Empire. Federation Forces discover top secret documents about "Albatros", an unfinished project developed by the Empire's predecessor, the "Badds" (also called the "Nazz" or Nazis in the Japanese version). Imperial leader Generalissimo Killt decides to complete the project himself. Upon learning the Empire's plot, the Federation sends in its national hero, Super Joe (the main character from the 1985 Capcom game Commando) to infiltrate the Empire, but he is captured. The Federation then sends in a second operative named Ladd to rescue him and to uncover the secret behind the Albatros project. Ladd is a member of the FF (Double Force) Battalion, a team of commandos specially trained to use wired guns to infiltrate enemy bases.

Gameplay begins as Ladd starts in Area 1, where he is told that the first several areas, already infiltrated by Federation troops, have communication devices and rooms which can be used to stay in contact with the Federation and for wiretapping to gain intelligence from the Empire. Upon reaching Area 3, Ladd finds through enemy intelligence that Super Joe was transported to the Imperial "disposal area", which a Federation spy later confirms. However, upon reaching the disposal area, an Imperial commander tells Ladd that Super Joe was transported elsewhere. Ladd eventually locates and rescues Super Joe from a POW camp, who informs Ladd that the Albatros project is a powerful laser cannon the Badds were unable to complete. However, the one person vital to the project's completion, Master-D (Hitler), is dead, and Generalissimo Killt has been unsuccessfully trying to resurrect him. Super Joe tells Ladd that they must stop Killt before he succeeds, and he asks Ladd to accompany him to the Imperial base located in Area 12.

When Ladd reaches the Imperial base, Super Joe tells him to break the power system in order to release two power barriers that are guarding the incomplete project. After doing so, Super Joe tells Ladd to defeat Killt and escape while he goes to destroy the base's power source. When Ladd reaches Killt's chamber, he boasts that the Albatros project has been completed without Master-D's help, turning off the device which would have resurrected him. As Killt is about to murder Ladd, electric shocks begin to occur around the holding tank containing Master-D's body, reviving Master-D and instantly killing Killt. Master-D then leaves the tank and approaches Ladd, declaring that he will use the Federation's forces to take over the world. Ladd vows to fight against Master-D, who calls Ladd a "damn fool" and unveils the Albatros. After destroying the Albatros, Ladd encounters a dying comrade named Hal, who gives Ladd a bazooka and tells him Master-D is escaping and that he needs to fire the bazooka into the cockpit of Master-D's chopper. Ladd uses his bionic arm to swing himself towards Master-D's chopper and fires the bazooka into the cockpit. Upon doing so, Ladd screams: "Your number's up! Monster!" The game then shows Master-D's head explode in a series of slow-motion frames.

The 60-second alarm inside the Imperial base sounds off. Ladd escapes, realizes that Super Joe is still inside, and runs back in to rescue him. The Federation's commander orders the full evacuation of the base. At the Federation base, troops surround Ladd and Super Joe to celebrate their victory. On August 2, 2010, an old Super Joe recalls the entire story and hopes that it will live on.

== Development ==
=== Localization ===
The use of the Nazi Swastika in the Japanese Famicom version was replaced with a symbol resembling the Nazi eagle for the English NES version.

For the release of the international version, several changes were made. Most references to Nazism in text and imagery were removed for the English localization. The Empire in the Japanese version was actually a neo-Nazi nation and the Imperial Army's insignia was a Nazi Swastika with a thunderbolt behind it. In the English version, the Nazis are referred as the "Badds", though the backstory in its manual refers to them as the "Nazz". The Imperial Army's Swastika insignia was changed to a symbol resembling the eagle emblem used by Nazi Germany; and the leader of the villains, originally called Weizmann in the Japanese version, was renamed Killt, although the soldiers and characters keep their same Nazi-like appearance. The difficulty of the game was rebalanced and some of the areas were made less difficult.

One of the most prominent differences is the identity of the ultimate antagonist, who is meant to be a revived Adolf Hitler in the Japanese version. For the English version, the character was renamed "Master-D", but his appearance remained the same. There is a gory ending sequence where Hitler's face explodes, which was also kept intact in the English version.

=== Music ===
The music was composed by Junko Tamiya, who was credited under the pseudonym "Gondamin". Two songs from the arcade versions are used in some areas. The music for the original arcade game was developed by Harumi Fujita. Tamiya adapted two of the original arcade tracks (the "Bionic Commando Theme" and "The Powerplant") and expanded the soundtrack by adding several more new songs in the console versions for the Japanese Famicom and the NES.

== Reception ==
Reception

Review scores
Publication	Score
1Up.com	A+
Famitsu	26/40

According to Capcom employee Ben Judd, the game did not sell well in Japan. In 1988, Nintendo Power featured it on the cover of its second issue with an 11-page "monster review" plus foldout poster. In 1997, Electronic Gaming Monthly ranked it the 32nd-best console game of all time, writing that having to swing instead of jump added unexpected depth to the platform genre. In 2003, the Nintendo Entertainment System (NES) version was inducted into GameSpot's list of the greatest games of all time. In 2008, Nintendo Power ranked it as the 17th-best NES game, describing it as one of its most original action games due to the ability to swing. GamesRadar ranked it the fourth-best NES game. The staff called it a classic and praised its grappling mechanic. The Japanese magazine Famitsu gave it 26 out of 40.

== Legacy ==
=== Remakes and re-releases ===
A portable adaptation of Bionic Commando was released for the Game Boy in 1992. The Game Boy version is based on the NES game, featuring the same gameplay and stages, and a similar plot, but alters the present day setting into a futuristic one. A second remake, Bionic Commando Rearmed, was developed by Grin and released in 2008 as a downloadable game for the PlayStation 3, Xbox 360, and Windows. The NES version was re-released as one of three NES games in the Game Boy Advance compilation Capcom Classics Mini-Mix, along with Strider and Mighty Final Fight.

=== Novelization ===
The game was novelized as Bionic Commando by J. B. Stamper as part of the Worlds of Power series of novels based on the NES version. The main character is identified as Jack Markson, who loses an arm when ninjas attack his hotel room and kidnap Super Joe. The Federation replaces his missing limb with a bionic arm that has a grappling hook and a number of other gadgets which are not featured in the game, like a flamethrower and a device capable of forcing prisoners to tell the truth. Like most books in the series, violence was toned down to non-lethality in many cases (he usually shoots enemy soldiers with tranquilizers), although certain events, such as the deaths of Hal and Killt, are kept. Much of the game's middle is skimmed over in order to fit it all into the book.
