= List of arcade video games: G =

This is a list of arcade video games organized alphabetically by name. It does not include PC or console games unless they were also released in video arcades. See Lists of video games for related lists.

Title	Alternate Title(s)	Year	Manufacturer	Genre(s)	Max. Players	PCB Model
G-Darius	G-Darius ver.2	1997	Taito	Scrolling shooter	2	
G-LOC: Air Battle	—	1990	Sega	Rail shooter	1	
G-Stream G 2020	—	2002	Oriental Soft			
G.I. Joe (arcade game)	—	1992	Konami		4	
G.T. Block Challenger	—	1978	Sun Electronics			
Gachaga Champ	—	1999	Konami			
Gaelco Championship Tuning Race	—	2005	Gaelco			
Gaelco FOOTBALL	—	2002	Gaelco			
GAHAHA Ippatsu-Dou	—	2000	Metro Corp.			
GAHAHA Ippatsu-Dou 2	—	2001	Metro Corp.			
Gaia: The Last Choice of Earth	—	1999	SemiCom			
Gaia Crusaders	—	1999	Noise Factory			
Gaiapolis	Gaiapolis - Koganedaka no Ken ^{JP}	1993	Konami	Beat 'em up	2	
Gain Ground	—	1988	Sega		3	
Galactic Storm	—	1992	Taito			
Galactic Warriors	—	1985	Konami	Fighting	2	
Galaga	—	1981	Namco	Fixed shooter	2	
Galaga '88	—	1987	Namco	Fixed shooter	2	Namco System 1
Galaxian	—	1979	Namco	Fixed shooter	2	
Galaxian 3: Project Dragoon	Galaxian 3 ^{JP}	1992	Namco	First-person shooter		
Galaxian 3: Attack of the Zolgear	—	1994	Namco	First-person shooter		
Galaxy Fight: Universal Warriors	—	1995	Sunsoft	Fighting	2	
Galaxy Force II	—	1988	Sega	Shooter	1	
Galaxy Game	—	1971	Computer Recreations	Shooter	2	
Galaxy Games: Multi-Game Video System	—	1998	CES		1	
Galaxy Games: Starpak 2	—	1998	CES		1	
Galaxy Games: Starpak 3	—	1998	CES		1	
Galaxy Games: Starpak 4	—	1998	CES		1	
Galaxy Gunners	—	1989	Electronic Devices	Shooter	1	
Galaxy Wars	Star Blazer^{JP}	1979	Universal	Fixed shooter	2	
Gallagher's Gallery	—	1992	American Laser Games			
Gallop Racer	—	1996	Tecmo			ZN-1
Gallop Racer 2	—	1997	Tecmo			
Gallop Racer 3	—	1999	Tecmo			
Galmedes	—	1993	Visco	Scrolling Shooter	2	
Gals Hustler	—	1997	Ace International			
Gals Panic	—	1990	Kaneko			
Gals Panic II	—	1993	Kaneko			
Gals Panic II Quiz Version	—	1993	Kaneko			
Gals Panic II' Special Version	—	1993	Kaneko			
Gals Panic 3	—	1995	Kaneko			
Gals Panic 4	—	1997	Kaneko			
Gals Panic EX	—	2000	Kaneko			
Gals Panic DX	—	2001	Kaneko			
Gals Panic S	—	1997	Kaneko			
Gals Panic S: Extra Edition	—	1997	Kaneko			
Gals Panic S2	—	1999	Kaneko			
Gals Panic S3	—	2003	Kaneko			
Gals Panic SU	—	1999	Kaneko			
Gals Pinball	—	1996	Comad			
Game Tengoku: The Game Paradise	—	1995	Jaleco			
Game Tree	—	1978	Project Support Engineering			
Games	—	1991	US Games, Inc.			
Gamshara	—	2002	Capcom			
Ganbare Chinsan! Ooshoubu	—	1987	Sanritsu			
Ganbare Ginkun	—	1995	Tecmo			
Ganbare Jajamaru Saisho wa Goo	—	1990	Jaleco			
Ganbare Marin-kun	—	2000	Capcom			
Gang Wars	—	1989	SNK			
Gangbusters	Crazy Cop	1988	Konami			
Gaplus	Galaga 3	1984	Namco	Fixed shooter	2	
Gardia	—	1986		Scrolling shooter	2	
Garou: Mark of the Wolves	—	1999	SNK			
Garogun Seroyang	—	2000	Yun Sung			
Garyo Retsuden	—	1987	Data East			
Gate-In! - Wai Wai Jockey	Photo Finish	1984	Jaleco			
Gate of Doom	Dark Seal ^{JP}	1990	Data East	Beat 'em up	2	
Gauntlet	—	1985	Atari Games	Hack and slash	4	
Gauntlet II	—	1986	Atari Games	Hack and slash	4	
Gauntlet Legends	—	1998	Atari Games	Hack and slash	4	
Gauntlet Dark Legacy	—	2000	Midway Games	Hack and slash	4	
Gee Bee	—	1978	Namco	Breakout / Video pinball	2	
Gekirindan	—	1995	Taito	Scrolling shooter	2	
Gekisou	Violent Run	1985	Eastern			
Gekitoride-Jong Space	—	2001	Namco			
Gekitou Pro Yakyuu: Mizushima Shinji All Stars vs. Pro Yakyuu	—	2003	Sega			
Gemini Wing	—	1987	Tecmo			
Genie	—	198?	Video Fun Games			
Genix Family	—	1994	NIX			
Genpei Tōma Den	—	1986	Namco	Beat 'em up	2	Namco System 86
Get Bass: Sega Bass Fishing	—	1997	Sega			
Get Bass: Sega Bass Fishing Deluxe	—	1997	Sega			
Get Outta My Face	—	2008	Snowrunner Productions			
Get-A-Way	—	1979	Universal			
Ghost Hunter	—	1994	Sega			
Ghost Pilots	—	1991	SNK	Scrolling shooter	2	
Ghost Squad	—	2004	Sega			
Ghost Squad Evolution	—	2007	Sega			
Ghosts'n Goblins	Makaimura ^{JP}	1985	Capcom	Platform game	2	
Ghoul Panic	—	1999	Raizing			
Ghouls'n Ghosts	Daimakaimura ^{JP}	1988	Capcom	Platform game	2	CPS1
Ghox	—	1991	Toaplan			
Giant Gram 2: All Japan Pro Wrestling In Nippon Budokan	—	1999	Sega			NAOMI cart.
Giant Gram 2000: All Japan Pro Wrestling 3 Brave Men of Glory	—	2000	Sega			NAOMI cart.
Giga Wing	—	1999	Capcom	Scrolling shooter	2	CPS2
Giga Wing 2	—	2000	Capcom	Scrolling shooter	2	
Giga Wing Generations	—	2004	Taito			
Gigandes	—	1989	East Technology	Scrolling shooter	2	
Gigas	—	1986	Sega	Breakout	2	
Gigas Mark II	—	1986	Sega	Breakout	2	
Gimme A Break	—	1985	Bally Sente	Sports	2	
Gindama Shoubu	—	1998	Nakanihon			
Gindama Shoubu Deluxe	—	1998	Nakanihon			
Ginga Ninkyouden	—	1987	Jaleco			
Gionbana	—	1989	Nichibutsu			
Gitadora Fuzz-Up	—	2022	Konami	Music	2	
Gladiator	Ougon no Shiro ^{JP} Great Gurianos ^{JP}	1986	Taito	Beat 'em up	2	
The Gladiator	Shen Jian; The Road of The Sword^{JP}	2003	IGS			
Gladiator 1984	—	1984	SNK			
Glass	—	1993	Gaelco		2	
The Glob	Beastie Feastie; Super Glob	1983	Epos			
GO 2000	—	2000	SA			
Go Go Mr. Yamaguchi: Jungle Survival	—	1985	Taito			
Goal To Go	—	1983	Stern Electronics			
Goal! Goal! Goal!	—	1995	Visco		2	
Goal IV	—	1975	Atari	Sports	4	
Goalie Ghost	—	1984	Bally Sente	Sports	2	
Godzilla	—	1993	Banpresto			
Gogetsuji Legends	Gouketsuji Ichizoku Saikyou Densetsu^{JP}	1995	Atlus	Fighting	2	
Goindol	—	1987	Sun A Electronics			
Gold Bug	—	1982	Century Electronics			
Gold Medalist	—	1988	SNK			
Golden Axe	—	1989	Sega	Hack and slash	2	
Golden Axe: The Duel	—	1994	Sega	Fighting	2	
Golden Axe: The Revenge of Death Adder	—	1992	Sega	Hack and slash	4	
Golden Fire II	—	1992	Topis	Puzzle/Erotic	2	
Golden Par Golf	—	1992	Strata			
Golden Tee '97	—	1997	Incredible Technologies			
Golden Tee '97 Tournament Edition	—	1997	Incredible Technologies			
Golden Tee '98	—	1998	Incredible Technologies			
Golden Tee '98 Tournament Edition	—	1998	Incredible Technologies			
Golden Tee '99	—	1999	Incredible Technologies			
Golden Tee '99 Tournament Edition	—	1999	Incredible Technologies			
Golden Tee 2K	—	2000	Incredible Technologies			
Golden Tee 3D Golf	—	1995	Incredible Technologies			
Golden Tee 3D Golf: Tournament Version	—	1995	Incredible Technologies			
Golden Tee Classic	—	2001	Incredible Technologies			
Golden Tee Fore!	—	2002	Incredible Technologies			
Golden Tee Fore! 2002	—	2002	Incredible Technologies			
Golden Tee Fore! 2003	—	2003	Incredible Technologies			
Golden Tee Fore! 2004	—	2004	Incredible Technologies			
Golden Tee Fore! 2004 Extra	—	2004	Incredible Technologies			
Golden Tee Fore! 2005	—	2004	Incredible Technologies			
Golden Tee Fore! Complete	—	2004	Incredible Technologies			
Golden Tee Golf	—	1990	Strata Group			
Golden Tee Golf II	—	1991	Strata Group			
Golden Tee Royal Edition Tournament	—	1999	Incredible Technologies			
Golden Tee Supreme Edition Tournament	—	2002	Incredible Technologies			
Golden Tee Tournament: Diamond Edition	—	1998	Incredible Technologies			
Golfing Greats	—					
Golgo 13	—	1999	Namco	Shooter	2	
Golgo 13 2: Kiseki no Dandou	—	2000	Namco	Shooter	2	
Golgo 13 3: Juusei no Chinkonka	—	2001	Namco	Shooter	2	
Golly! Ghost!	—	1990	Namco	Shooter	2	
Golly! Ghost! 2	Bubble Trouble : Golly! Ghost! 2	1992	Namco	Shooter	2	
Gomoku Narabe Renju	—	1981	Nichibutsu		1	
GondoMania	Makyou Senshi	1987	Data East			
Gone Fishing	—	2002	IGS		1	
Gone Fishing 2	—	2002	IGS		1	
Good	—	1998			1	
Good E Jong: Kachinuki Mahjong Syoukin Oh!!	—	1991	Seibu Kaihatsu			
Goori Goori	—	1999	Unico Electronics			
Gorf	—	1981	Midway	Fixed shooter	2	
Gorodki	—	1989	Terminal			
Gorkans	Mr. TNT	1983	Techstar			
Got-cha: Mini Game Festival	Pasha Pasha Champ: Mini Game Festival	1997	Dongsung Wonder Park			
Gotcha	—	1973	Atari	Maze	2	
Gouketsuji Ichizoku 3: Groove on Fight	—	1997	Atlus			Sega ST-V
Gouketsuji Ichizoku Senzo Kuyou	—	2009	Atlus			
Gourmet Battle Quiz Ryouri-ou CooKing	The Hand	1998	—			
GP Rider	—	1990	Sega	Racing	2	
GP World	—	1984	Sega	Racing		
Gradius	Nemesis	1985	Konami	Scrolling shooter	2	
Gradius II	Vulcan Venture	1988	Konami	Scrolling shooter	2	
Gradius III	—	1989	Konami	Scrolling shooter	2	
Gradius IV: Fukkatsu	—	1998	Konami	Scrolling shooter	2	
Gran Trak 10	—	1974	Atari	Racing	1	
Gran Trak 20	—	1974	Atari	Racing	2	
Grand Champion	—	1981	Taito	Racing	1	
Grand Cross	—					
Grand Striker - Human Cup	—					
Grand Striker 2	—					
Grand Tour	—					
Grasspin	—	1983	Jaleco			
Gratia - Second Earth	—	1996	Jaleco			
Gravitar	Lunar Battle (prototype title)	1982	Atari	Multi-directional shooter	2	
Great 1000 Miles Rally	1000 Miglia: Great 1000 Miles Rally^{EU}	1994	Kaneko	Racing	1	
Great 1000 Miles Rally 2	Mille Miglia 2 - Great 1000 Miles Rally^{JP}	1995	Kaneko	Racing	2	
Great Bishi Bashi Champ	—	2002	Konami			
Great Guns	—	1983	Stern Electronics			
Great Sluggers - New World Stadium	—	1993	Namco	Sports	2	
Great Sluggers - Featuring 1994 Team Rosters	—	1994	Namco	Sports	2	
Great Swordsman	—	1984	Allumer / Taito (publisher)	Fighting	2	
Green Beret	—	1980	Irem			
The Grid	—	2000	Midway Games		4	
Grid Seeker: Project Storm Hammer	—	1992	Taito	Scrolling shooter	2	
Gridiron Fight	—	1985				
Grobda	—	1984	Namco	Shooter	2	
Growl	Runark	1991	Taito	Beat 'em up	2	
Ground Effects	—	1992	Taito	Racing	1	
Grudge Match (Yankee Game Technology)	—	1989	Yankee Game Technology	Fighting	1	
GTI Club Corso Italiano	—	2000	Konami			
GTI Club Rally Cote D'azur	—	1996	Konami			
Guardian	Get Star^{JP}	1986	Taito			
Guardian Force	—	1998	Success			
Guardians	—	1995	Banpresto	Beat 'em up		
Guardians of the 'Hood	—	1992	Atari Games	Beat 'em up	3	
Guerrilla War	Guevara^{JP}	1987				
Guided Missile	—	1977	Bally Midway			
Guilty Gear Isuka	—	2004	Sammy Corporation	Fighting		
Guilty Gear X	—	2000	Sega	Fighting		NAOMI cart.
Guilty Gear X Version 1.5	—	2003	Sammy Corporation	Fighting		
Guilty Gear XX	—	2002	Sammy Corporation	Fighting		NAOMI GD-ROM
Guilty Gear XX #Reload	—	2003	Sammy Corporation	Fighting		NAOMI GD-ROM
Guilty Gear XX Accent Core	—	2006	Sega	Fighting		NAOMI GD-ROM
Guilty Gear XX Slash	—	2005	Sammy Corporation	Fighting		NAOMI GD-ROM
Guitar Freaks	—	1999	Konami			
GuitarFreaks 2ndMix	—	1999	Konami			
GuitarFreaks 2ndMix Link Version	—	1999	Konami			
GuitarFreaks 3rdMix	—	2000	Konami			
GuitarFreaks 4thMix	—	2000	Konami			
GuitarFreaks 5thMix	—	2001	Konami			
GuitarFreaks 6thMix	—	2001	Konami			
GuitarFreaks 7thMix	—	2002	Konami			
GuitarFreaks 8thMix	—	2002	Konami			
GuitarFreaks 9thMix	—	2003	Konami			
GuitarFreaks 10thMix	—	2003	Konami			
GuitarFreaks 11thMix	—	2004	Konami			
GuitarFreaks V	—	2005	Konami			
GuitarFreaks V2	—	2005	Konami			
GuitarFreaks V3	—	2005	Konami			
Guitar Hero Arcade	—	2009	Raw Thrills			
Gulf. Storm	—					
Gulf War-II	—	1991	Comad	Scrolling shooter	2	
Gumbo	—	1994	Min			
Gun Champ	—	1980	Model Racing			
Gun Dealer	—	1990	Dooyong			
Gun Dealer 94	—	1994	Dooyong			
Gun Fight	—	1975	Bally Midway			
Gun Force - Battle Fire Engulfed Terror Island	—	1991	Irem	Scrolling shooter	2	
Gun Force II	Geo Storm	1994	Irem	Scrolling shooter	2	
Gun Frontier	—	1990	Taito	Scrolling shooter	2	
Gun Mania	—	2000	Konami			
Gun Survivor 2 BIOHAZARD -Code:Veronica-	—	2001	Namco	Rail shooter	2	
Gun.Smoke	—	1985	Capcom	Scrolling shooter	2	
Gunbarich	—	2001	Psikyo	Breakout	2	
Gunbird	Mobile Light Force ^{US}	1994	Psikyo	Scrolling shooter	2	
Gunbird 2	—	1998	Psikyo	Scrolling shooter	2	
Gunblade NY	—	1996	Sega	Light gun	2	
Gunbuster	Operation Gunbuster ^{US}	1992	Taito	First-person shooter	2	
Gundam Battle Operating Simulator	—	2005	Banpresto		1	
Gundhara - Juudan Arashi	—	1995	Banpresto			
GunMaster	—					
Gunmen Wars	—	1998	Namco			
Gunnail	—	1993	NMK	Scrolling shooter	2	
Gunpey	—	1999				
Gururin	—	1994				
Guts'n	—	2000	Kaneko			
Guttang Gottong	Loco-Motion	1982	Konami	Puzzle	2	
Guwange	—	1999	CAVE	Scrolling shooter	2	
Guzzler	—	1983	Tehkan		2	
Gyakuten!! Puzzle Bancho	—					
Gypsy Juggler	—	1978	Meadows Games			
Gyrodine	Buzzard	1984	Taito	Scrolling shooter	2	
Gyruss	—	1983	Konami	Tube shooter	2	
