= List of arcade video games: J =

This is a list of arcade video games organized alphabetically by name. It does not include PC or console games unless they were also released in video arcades. See Lists of video games for related lists.

Title	Alternate Title(s)	Year	Manufacturer	Genre(s)	Max. Players	PCB Model
J-League Soccer V-Shoot	—	1994	Namco	Sports	2	
J. J. Squawkers	—	1993	Athena	Platformer	2	
Jack Rabbit	—	1984	Zaccaria	Platformer	2	
Jack the Giantkiller	Treasure Hunt^{JP}	1982	Cinematronics	Platformer	2	
Jackie Chan: The Kung-Fu Master	Jackie Chan in Fists of Fire: Cheng Long Densetsu JP	1995	Kaneko		2	
Jackal	Top Gunner US	1986	Konami	Run and gun	2	
Jackpot Joker Poker	—	1983	Enter-Tech			
Jail Break	Manhattan 24th Precinct	1985	Konami	Run and gun	2	
Jambo! Safari	—	1999	Sega			NAOMI cart.
Jan Jan Paradise	—	1996	Electro Design			
Jan Jan Paradise 2	—	1997	Electro Design			
Jan Oh	—	1984	Toaplan			
Jan Yu Ki	Jong Yu Ki	1988	Dynax			
Jang Taku	—	1986	Dyna Computer			
Jangokushi - Haou no Saihai	—	1999	Capcom	Mahjong game	2	CPS2
Janputer '96	—	1996	Nakanihon			
Janputer Special	—	1997	Nakanihon			
Janshi	—	1992	Eagle			
Janshin Densetsu: Quest of Jongmaster	—	1994	Aicom	Mahjong video game	2	NeoGeo
Jansoh	—	1985	Dyna Computer			
Jeon Sin - Guardian Storm	—	1998	Afega	Scrolling Shooter	2	
Jet Fighter	—	1975	Atari	Shooter	2	
Jibun wo Migaku Culture School Mahjong Hen	—	1994	Face			
Jikkyou Powerful Pro Yakyuu '96	—	1996	Konami			
Jikkyou Powerful Pro Yakyuu EX	—	1998	Konami			
Jikkyou Powerful Pro Yakyuu EX '98	—	1998	Konami			
JIN	—	1982	Falcon			
Jin Sanse	—	1998	Sealy	Scrolling Shooter	2	
Jingi Storm: The Arcade	—	2006	Atrativa Japan			NAOMI GD-ROM
Jitsuroku Maru-chi Mahjong: Sugoku H na Kokuhaku Hen	—	1993	Windom			
Jitsuryoku!! Pro Yakyuu	—	1989	Jaleco			
Jockey Grand Prix	—	2001	BreezaSoft Corp.	Racing	2	NeoGeo
Joe & Mac	Caveman Ninja; Joe & Mac: Tatakae Genshijin ^{JP}	1991	Data East	Platform game	2	
Joe & Mac Returns	—	1994	Data East	Platformer	2	
John Elway's Team Quarterback	—	1987	Leland	Sports	4	
Johnny Nero: Action Hero	—	2004	ICE	Shooting gallery	2	
Join 'em	—	1983	Global			
JoJo's Bizarre Adventure	JoJo no Kimyouna Bouken - Miraie no Isan ^{JP}	1998	Capcom	Fighting	2	CPS3
JoJo's Venture	JoJo no Kimyouna Bouken ^{JP}	1998	Capcom	Fighting	2	CPS3
Joker Master	—	199?				
Joker Poker / Jacks Plus	—	198?	Mainline			
Jolly Jogger	—	1982	Taito	Maze	2	
Jong Pai Puzzle Choko	—	2001	Mitchell Corporation	Mahjong game	2	CPS2
Jong Shin	—	1986	Dyna Electronics			
Jong Yu Ki	—	1988	Dynax			
Jongputer	—	1981	Alpha Denshi			
Joshi Volleyball	—	1983	Taito			
Journey	—	1983	Bally Midway	Action	2	
Joust	—	1982	Williams	Platformer	2	
Joust 2: Survival of the Fittest	—	1986	Williams	Platformer	2	
Joy Joy Kid	—	1990	SNK		2	NeoGeo
Jr. Pac-Man	—	1983	Bally Midway	Maze	2	
Jumbo Ozaki Super Masters	—	1989	Sega			
Judge Dredd Arcade	—	1997	Acclaim	Shooting gallery	2	ZN-1
Jump Bug	—	1981	Hoei Corporation	Platformer	2	
Jump Coaster	—	1983	Kaneko	Platformer	2	
Jump Kids	—	1999	Comad	Platformer	2	
Jump Jump	—	1999	Comad			
Jumping Break	—	1999	F2 Systems			
Jumping Cross	—	1984	SNK			
Jumping Jack	—	1984	Universal			
Jumping Pop	—	2001	ESD			
Jungle Hunt	Jungle King ^{JP}	1982	Taito	Action	2	
Jungler	—	1981	Konami			
Juno First	—	1983	Konami	Fixed shooter	2	
Jurassic Park	—	1994	Sega AM3	Rail shooter	2	
Jurassic Park III	—	2001	Konami	Rail shooter	2	
Jurassic Park Arcade	—	2015	Raw Thrills	Rail shooter	2	
