= Giga Wing Generations =

2004 video game

GigaWing Generations
- Japanese PlayStation 2 cover art
- Developer: Takumi Corporation
- Publishers: Taito (Arcade, PS2); 505 Game Street (PS2)
- Platforms: Arcade, PlayStation 2
- Release: JP: October 2004 (arcade); JP: 24 March 2005 (PS2); JP: 23 February 2006 (PS2 rerelease); EU: 3 February 2006 (PS2)
- Genre: Scrolling shooter
- Modes: Single-player, multiplayer
- Arcade system: Taito Type X

GigaWing Generations, released in Japan as Yokushin: GigaWing Generations (翼神 Gigawing Generations), is a 2004 vertically scrolling shooter arcade game developed by Takumi and published by Taito on their Taito Type X arcade system board. It was ported to the PlayStation 2 console in 2005.

== Gameplay ==
Gameplay continues from Giga Wing and Giga Wing 2. Generations has no characters to pilot the 4 selectable planes and no storyline. Each ship varies in ability more drastically than they do in previous Giga Wing games including flight speed and shot type. The player now selects which stage (out of two) to tackle first (in previous Giga Wings the plane choice affected the starting stage). The distinctive Reflect Force attack remains a major part of gameplay, though the new Reflect Laser from Giga Wing 2 was removed for Generations. A major addition is the ability to gain additional points from defeating enemies at close range. Generations is also the first and only Takumi scrolling shooter to use a vertically-oriented monitor (with standard player-controlled vertical scrolling).

In 2-player mode, both player shares the same multiplier, which allows players to reach score levels otherwise impossible to achieve in single player mode.

== Ports ==
The later PlayStation 2 version added score attack mode, and the ability to change monitor settings. Strangely, the framerate of the PlayStation 2 port is lower than the arcade game. This version was released in Japan and Europe.
