= Dungeons & Dragons: Shadow over Mystara =

1996 arcade game

- Japanese arcade flyer
- Developer: Capcom
- Publisher: Capcom
- Designers: Kenji Kataoka "Malachie"
- Artist: Kinu Nishimura
- Writer: Alex Jimenez
- Composer: Masato Kouda
- Series: Mystara
- Platforms: Arcade, Sega Saturn
- Release: Arcade: JP: February 1996; NA/EU: 1996; Saturn: JP: March 4, 1999
- Genres: Beat 'em up, action role-playing
- Mode: Up to 4 players (cooperative)
- Arcade system: CP System II/JAMMA+

Dungeons & Dragons: Shadow over Mystara (Note: Japanese: ダンジョンズ&ドラゴンズ シャドーオーバーミスタラ, Hepburn: Danjonzu & Doragonzu Shadō ōbā Misutara) is a 1996 beat 'em up game developed and published by Capcom for arcades. It is a sequel to Dungeons & Dragons: Tower of Doom. The game is set in the Dungeons & Dragons campaign setting of Mystara.

Combining the side-scrolling gameplay of a beat 'em up with some aspects found in a role-playing video game, Shadow over Mystara has many mechanics not commonly found in arcade games, such as finding and equipping gear and earning new spells as the player gains experience. Players can wield a large variety of weapons and armor, although this selection is limited by the character that is chosen. There is also an extensive assortment of magical and hidden items in the game, many of which are completely unknown to exist to the average player. This, along with the addition of multiple endings and forking paths, gives the game high replayability and has led to a cult following among fans of the genre. It was one of the last 2-D arcade side-scrollers created by Capcom; only Battle Circuit (1997) came after Shadow over Mystara.

The game has seen two home releases as part of the compilations: Dungeons & Dragons Collection published for the Sega Saturn in 1999, and Dungeons & Dragons: Chronicles of Mystara made available on the Nintendo eShop, PlayStation Network, Xbox Live Arcade and Steam in 2013.

== Gameplay ==
Gameplay screenshot with Cleric and Elf.

In addition to the four heroes found in its predecessor, Dungeons & Dragons: Tower of Doom (Cleric, Dwarf, Elf and Fighter), Shadow of Mystara adds a Thief and a Magic-User to the selection of player characters. Furthermore, with the inclusion of two separate versions of each character's sprite set, the game allows up to two players to pick the same character (in Tower of Doom, the characters could only be selected once), effectively giving the game 12 "different" characters to choose from. The two Magic-Users and the two Clerics also have subtle differences within their spell books.

The controls use four buttons: Attack, Jump, Select (brings up a small inventory ring around the character allowing the player to pick what item is set in the Use slot) and Use. The Cleric, Elf and Magic-User also have two extra rings for their spells, with the Jump button used to switch from ring to ring. While the game uses the same kick harness as the previous game, the Select and Use buttons are reversed.

Shadow over Mystara also introduced a selection of special moves which are executed by moving the joystick and tapping the buttons in certain combinations, in a way similar to the Street Fighter series. The characters (except for the Magic-User) have a Dashing Attack as well as a Rising Attack which can be used to combo monsters or juggle them in the air. Most characters (with the exception of the Magic-User and Cleric) have a Megacrush, a move which damages all enemies standing close enough to the character, but in turn also damages the player themselves.

The game offers a small selection of arcane magic, available for the Magic-User and Elf, and divine magic, available to the Cleric. Instead of an MP system, characters use D&D's Vancian magic system where a certain amount of each spell is ready to cast. Extra uses of the spells can be picked up from the ground, represented graphically as scrolls, or occasionally recharged after certain boss fights. When a spell is cast, the entire game is momentarily paused during which the spell effect is played out (some spells can be controlled within this time).

Every character starts with their armor (the second slot) already filled, specific to their character, and remains unchanged the entire game. The character's helmet (the first slot) and shield (the fifth slot) are the other two items that lend to a character's defensive ability. Most characters also begin with a shield, except the Magic-User and Thief, who cannot use shields. While magical items in traditional D&D rules are practically invulnerable or tough, the magical items in Shadow over Mystara are extremely fragile. Magical boots (slot three), gauntlets (slot four), and rings (slot six) are all destroyed after the player is damaged a few times. The eighth slot is used for miscellaneous items, such as the "Skin of the Displacer Beast" or the "Eye of the Beholder". Many bosses drop rare items such as these and they either grant special abilities or can be traded in for magical equipment. There are also many unique hidden items (for example, near the end of the game is a treasure chest which contains the Staff of Wizardry when opened by the Magic-User: if the Magic-User wields the staff during the final boss fight and there are at least three players with a combined total of over 1 million experience points, the Staff will glow and the team will be able to use the powerful Final Strike attack).

In between many stages, the players find themselves inside small town stores where they can restock on common items such as arrows, burning oils, throwing daggers and healing potions. Players can sell items for gold and also trade special items found during boss battles with shopkeepers to earn unique magical items. The players can also come across a special gnome village where the townfolk beg to be saved from a chimera (the gnomes, unlike the traditional Dungeons & Dragons depiction of gnomes, are very tiny, standing about a foot tall).

== Plot ==
After defeating the Arch Lich Deimos, the heroes continued on their journey through the Broken Lands of Glantri upon realizing that Deimos was only part of an even greater evil plan, and he was in fact being used by a mysterious sorceress named Synn, who appears to be a young woman, but commands a powerful magical abilities, has been scheming to control the Kingdom of Glantri and conquer the humanoids of the Republic of Darokin. After Deimos was defeated, Synn vowed to punish the land that she desired.

At the game's end, the player discovers that Synn is in fact a centuries-old red dragon, determined to harness the mystical forces of the lands she has conquered, in order to awaken a creature of even more devastating physical prowess than herself - known and described only as The Fiend. The heroes then fight against Synn in her lair. When she is slain, her monster is also destroyed by an airship bombing.

== Characters ==
The character select screen

- Cleric (default name Greldon / Miles*): The Cleric's role is to be the party's healer and buffer, but he is also a formidable warrior, possessing the best rushing attack in the game. He also has the ability to turn undead, instantly destroying skeletons and ghouls, and can cast from a large library of clerical spells that can heal, strengthen allies, and debilitate or harm enemies. In line with classic Dungeons & Dragons rules, the cleric cannot wield any weapon that is bladed, but he can wield a spiked morningstar from which he gains new special attacks.
- Dwarf (default name Dimsdale / Hendel*): The Dwarf is a hardy character that has the most hit points in the game, and is able to deal the highest amount of physical damage within a short time. His short stature allows him to safely pass under enemy projectiles. The Dwarf has strengths that lie in his special attacks rather than his normal attacks. He also has the unique ability to bash opened treasure chests to reveal extra gold and treasure.
- Elf (default name Lucia / Kayla*): The Elf is a female fighter-mage, combining the offense of a Fighter with the spells of a Magic-user. Although her capabilities are less powerful than the Fighter and Magic-User respectively, she remains a versatile and useful character. Her disadvantages are her low constitution and defense, and the shortest melee weapon reach in the game. The Elf's attack hitbox remains the same and is not improved even when using weapons longer than her default short sword. Much like the Dwarf, she reaches her maximum level fairly early, which gives her an advantage at first, but halts her progression abruptly and reduces the effectiveness of consumable magic items such as the Bottle of Efreet.
- Fighter (default name Crassus / Jarred*): The Fighter is a melee character with an excellent moveset, long weapon reach, high endurance, and the best armor class, making him suitable for beginners and experts alike. He can wield nearly every weapon in the game, including the two-handed sword, and is the only character with the ability to dual-wield by using a short sword in his offhand. The Sword of Legends item is named after the highest ranking Fighter in the high scores.
- Magic-User (default name Syous / D'raven*): The Magic-User is a master of devastating spells, but is physically the weakest character. As such, he is quick to die when played by novices due to his low constitution and relatively weak melee abilities. To offset his low amount of health, the Magic-User has a useful teleportation move which allows him to dodge all physical attacks (and can be used to perform elaborate and damaging combos by experienced players), along with a spell that grants him temporary invulnerability. The Magic-User is a difficult but rewarding character to use that requires previous knowledge of the game and effective management of his spells. His offensive spells are greatly enhanced by the Staff of Wizardry, arguably making him the most powerful character.
- Thief (default name Moriah / Shannon*): The female Thief is a quick and dexterous warrior with many unique acrobatic skills, such as a double jump, wall jump, back flip, and leap across the screen. She has the abilities to pick locks, detect traps, pickpocket enemies, and even back stab enemies for severe damage. The Thief also has an unlimited supply of rocks to sling with and utilizes flasks of burning oil in some of her special attacks, but suffers defensively due to her moderate constitution and lack of a shield. The Thief has the highest maximum level in the game and thus benefits the most from consumable magic items, such as the Bottle of Efreet, that increase in effectiveness with the character level.
- Default name playing with second version of these characters.

Players, upon completion of their first stage, are prompted to enter a character name. Unlike many games at the time which only allow a person to enter three letters, Shadow over Mystara has space for six. The game provides a default name for each of the characters. The default name is also automatically used if the player tries to submit a blank name or use vulgarity.

== Release ==
The arcade version was released in 1996. The guide/art book was published by Shinseisha in the Gamest Mook series that same year.

=== Dungeons & Dragons Collection ===
Dungeons & Dragons Collection is a two-disc compilation of Tower of Doom and Shadow over Mystara. It was released only in Japan on March 4, 1999, exclusively for the Sega Saturn. The ports have minor differences in gameplay, and there is a maximum of two players instead of the original four. Capcom originally planned to release Tower of Doom as a standalone title for the Sega Saturn and Sony PlayStation, but cancelled the plan early on. It was initially announced that the collection would be released for both the Saturn and PlayStation, with the PlayStation version due for a U.S. release, but the PlayStation version was never completed.

In 1999, James Mielke of GameSpot criticized the loading times as "horrendous", with mid-level battles occasionally pausing to let data stream in, and "as a very basic scrolling hacker", he called it simply "OK" and average. In 2005, IGN picked the Dungeons & Dragons Collection as one of the top ten co-op games. Retro Gamer included it on their list of ten essential Saturn imports, praising its "stunning animation thanks to using the 4MB ram pack" and opining that while it suffers from lengthy loading times, they called it the best scrolling fighter game on the system, and felt to be superior to Taito's PuLiRuLa and Capcom's own Dynasty Warriors (the Retro Gamer team were confusing Dynasty Warriors with Dynasty Wars). In 2023, Time Extension included the collection on their top 25 "Best Beat 'Em Ups of All Time" list.

=== Dungeons & Dragons: Chronicles of Mystara ===
Tower of Doom and Shadow over Mystara were released as part of the Dungeons & Dragons: Chronicles of Mystara compilation for the Wii U, PlayStation 3, Xbox 360 and Microsoft Windows in the summer of 2013.

== Reception ==
Reception

Review scores
Publication	Score
AllGame	4.5/5
Next Generation	3/5
Player One	95%
Super Game Power	4.0/5.0
VideoGame	9/10

Awards
Publication	Award
Retro Gamer (2008)	#16 Top 25 Arcade Games
GameSpy (2011)	#50 Top 50 Arcade Games of All-Time
Heavy.com (2013)	#18 Top 25 Beat 'Em Up Video Games

Dungeons & Dragons: Shadow over Mystara has been very well received. In Japan, Game Machine listed the game on their April 1, 1996 issue as being the sixth most-popular arcade game at the time. Upon release, a reviewer for Next Generation said that the game is "full of the stuff" which made the original fun. He further said that the game had refined Dungeons & Dragons: Tower of Doom, improving the animation quality to X-Men: Children of the Atom level, expanding the number of playable characters, adding more stage branches and endings to create deeper gameplay and story, and incorporating more interesting character abilities like wielding two swords. Despite this, he gave it only three out of five stars. Wataru Maruyama of VideoGames praised the game's "astounding" graphical details and called it "Capcom's latest masterpiece". In 2004, Allen Rausch of GameSpy said Shadows Over Mystara was a stellar game back when arcades were a place to find the hottest games, and that the game is still fun today. Spanish website MeriStation also gave it a positive retrospective outlook. Both Tower of Doom and Shadow over Mystara have since gained a cult following.

Retro Gamer ranked Dungeons & Dragons: Shadow over Mystara as the sixteenth top retro arcade game. In 2011, GameSpy ranked the game as number 50 on their list of the top arcade games, calling it "one of the most purely entertaining titles ever released" for any platform. In 2013, the title was ranked as the eighteenth top beat 'em up video game of all time by Heavy.com. Kotaku included it among the best looking beat 'em up games from the 16-bit era. IGN ranked Shadow Over Mystara number 9 on their list of "The Top 11 Dungeons & Dragons Games of All Time" in 2014.
