= Twin Cobra =

1987 video game

- Developer: Toaplan
- Publishers: JP/EU: Taito; NA: Romstar
- Artist: Kōetsu Iwabuchi
- Composers: Masahiro Yuge; Tatsuya Uemura
- Series: Tiger
- Platforms: Android, Arcade, FM Towns, iOS, Nintendo Entertainment System, PC Engine, PlayStation, Genesis, X68000
- Release: JP: October 6, 1987; NA: November 1987; EU: Early 1988
- Genre: Scrolling shooter
- Modes: Single-player, multiplayer

Twin Cobra, known as Kyukyoku Tiger (Note: Japanese: 究極タイガー(きゅうきょくタイガー), Hepburn: Kyūkyoku Taigā; lit. "Ultimate Tiger" or "Extreme Tiger") in Japan, is a vertically scrolling shooter developed by Toaplan and released for arcades in 1987 by Taito in Japan and Europe, then in North America by Romstar. It is a sequel to the 1985 arcade game Tiger-Heli. Controlling the titular attack helicopter, the players must fight endless waves of military vehicles while avoiding collision with their projectiles and other obstacles. It was the fourth shoot 'em up game from Toaplan, and their tenth video game overall. It was ported to multiple platforms, with each done by different third-party developers that made several changes or additions.

Twin Cobra was a success for Toaplan, garnering positive reception from western critics and earning several awards from Gamest. The game was met with mixed response from magazines, specifically the home versions. In 1995, the sequel Twin Cobra II was released. The rights to Twin Cobra are owned by Tatsujin, a Japanese company formed by Masahiro Yuge, though Taito retains the rights to its sequel.

== Hardware ==
The game ran on the Toaplan Twin Cobra hardware (PCB), featuring a Motorola 68000 CPU clocked at 7 MHz with additional chips (a Z80 CPU clocked at 3.5 MHz and a 320C10 chip at 3.5 MHz) as well as a Yamaha YM3812 sound chip clocked at 3.5 MHz. Toaplan's Flying Shark used the same arcade hardware board.

== Gameplay ==
Arcade version screenshot

Twin Cobra is a military-themed vertically scrolling shoot 'em up game, in which players take control of the titular attack helicopter through ten increasingly difficult levels, each with a boss at the end that must be fought before progressing any further, in order to defeat an assortment of military enemy forces like tanks, battleships, and artillery as the main objective. The title initially appears to be very standard, as players control their craft over a constantly scrolling background and the scenery never stops moving until a helipad is reached. Players have only two weapons at their disposal: the standard shot that travels a max distance of the screen's height and three bombs.

The bombs are powerful weapons capable of obliterating any enemy caught within its blast radius and collecting "B" icons adds an extra bomb stock. A new gameplay addition compared to its predecessor are power-up items that appear via enemy carriers; There are four types of weapons in the game that can be switched between after destroying incoming carriers by picking up color-changing icons ranging from red, blue, green and yellow, while "S" icons increases the helicopter's firepower. Other items scattered throughout the levels such as 1-ups and star-shaped gold medals, which grants a 3000-point bonus by collecting them, can also be picked up along the way. Players are given two lives initially and bonus lives are awarded at certain point thresholds and every point threshold thereafter.

Depending on the region, the title uses either a checkpoint system in which a downed single player will start off at the beginning of the checkpoint they managed to reach before dying, or a respawn system where their ship immediately starts at the location they died at. Getting hit by enemy fire or colliding against enemies will result in losing a life, as well as a penalty of decreasing the helicopter's firepower to his original state and once all lives are lost, the game is over unless the players insert more credits into the arcade machine to continue playing. After completing the last stage as with previous titles from Toaplan, the game begins again with the second loop increasing in difficulty and enemies fire denser bullet patterns.

== Development ==
Most of the artwork were hand-drawn sketches created by the development team before being transposed to pixel art graphics.

Twin Cobra's creation process and history was recounted through various Japanese publications by composers Masahiro Yuge and Tatsuya Uemura, both of which collaborated with the soundtrack using guitar and marked the second time Toaplan made use of FM synthesis. Yuge stated that the basic structure for the game was already decided during development of Slap Fight by pursuing the excitement of shooting and dodging, settling on the bomb and shot system, claiming that firing a bomb relieved stress from players, as they wanted to make a game that was fun by looking at and get passionate about it. Yuge also claimed that the word "Kyūkyoku" for its Japanese title derived from a translation of Going for the One, the eight studio album by English progressive rock band Yes, as it was not a popular word at the time and although the Japanese title was initially rejected by then-president of Toaplan, he was determined to implement it. The concept of using a bomb came up during development of Tiger-Heli, where the team questioned how to make a shoot 'em up game more engaging for players but it was never intended for defensive purposes according to them, as the mechanic was instead implemented to provide an aggressive feeling against enemies on difficult situations, however enemies were made tougher to keep gameplay balance.

Twin Cobra was also, alongside Slap Fight, one of the earliest projects Toaplan made use of game design documents, with both Uemura and Yuge stating that ideas by the team were first written in text using A4 paper before reading it during meetings. Several features were integrated into the project by diverse factors such as items swirling around the screen, which was inspired by a donburi bowl, while the slow speed of the helicopter was due to make the title akin to puzzle games and require a level of strategy. Yuge stated that cooperative gameplay was originally not developed but were requested in doing so after completing the single-player version due to simultaneous two-player titles being "a big trend" in overseas regions and being conscious of the American market, as the game had a realistic war setting. Around five members collaborated with the project on a six-month development period including Uemura and Yuge acting as programmers, as well as three designers. Artist Kōetsu Iwabuchi, who previously worked on Guardian, was responsible for the artwork. Despite being published by Taito, Uemura stated that the publisher allowed them to reveal the project was made by Toaplan. Uemura also claimed the project was influenced by Halley's Comet, as he wanted to portray the feeling of aiming and shooting.

== Release ==
Twin Cobra was first released across arcades worldwide in October 1987 by Taito in Japan and Europe, as well as Romstar in North America. An album containing music from the title and its predecessor was co-published exclusively in Japan by Scitron and Pony Canyon in November 1988.

=== Ports ===
Twin Cobra was converted to multiple platforms by various third-party developers including the PC Engine (1989), Nintendo Entertainment System (1989), Sega Genesis (1991), X68000 (1993) and the FM Towns (1994). The PC Engine port, developed by A.I Company, was released exclusively in Japan by Taito. The NES port, developed by Micronics, was first released in Japan CBS/Sony and later in North America by Sammy. The Genesis port, developed by Graphic Research (GRC), was first published in Japan by Treco, then in North America by Sega (under license by Treco's American division), and later in Brazil by Tectoy. On 30 August 1996, Banpresto released a compilation for the PlayStation exclusively in Japan titled Toaplan Shooting Battle 1, which included both arcade versions of Twin Cobra and its prequel, an arranged soundtrack by Uemura and other additions. In November 2019, Twin Cobra was re-released for iOS and Android mobile devices only in Japan by MOBIRIX Corporation under the name Kyukyoku Tiger Classic. A port for Samsung Smart TV platform is also available through a Samsung TV's games panel.

==== M2 ShotTriggers ====
Twin Cobra was later included by M2 as part of their M2 ShotTriggers publishing label. An arcade version, alongside the PC Engine, Nintendo Entertainment System and Sega Genesis versions, were included in the Kyukyoku Tiger-Heli compilation for Nintendo Switch and PlayStation 4 as part of M2's Toaplan Arcade Garage label in 2022.

==== Steam ====
Twin Cobra was released on Steam in February 2023. Bitwave Games was responsible for the port of this version.

== Reception ==
Reception
Review scores
Publication	Scores					
Publication	Arcade	PC Engine	NES	SMD/GEN	X68K	FMT
AllGame	3.5/5	—N/a	—N/a	4/5	—N/a	—N/a
ASM	—N/a	10/12	—N/a	7/12	—N/a	—N/a
Beep! Mega Drive	—N/a	—N/a	—N/a	28/40	—N/a	—N/a
Commodore User	6/10	—N/a	—N/a	—N/a	—N/a	—N/a
CVG	Positive	91%	—N/a	66%	—N/a	—N/a
CVG Mean Machines	—N/a	88%	—N/a	—N/a	—N/a	—N/a
Edge	—N/a	—N/a	—N/a	—N/a	—N/a	8/10
EGM	—N/a	—N/a	26/40	30/40	—N/a	—N/a
Famimaga	—N/a	—N/a	20.17/30	—N/a	—N/a	—N/a
Famitsu	—N/a	33/40	22/40	21/40	—N/a	—N/a
The Games Machine	—N/a	86/100	—N/a	—N/a	—N/a	—N/a
Hippon Super!	—N/a	—N/a	—N/a	20/100	—N/a	—N/a
Joystick	—N/a	—N/a	—N/a	78%	—N/a	—N/a
Marukatsu PC Engine	—N/a	35/40	—N/a	—N/a	—N/a	—N/a
MDAG	—N/a	—N/a	—N/a	78%	—N/a	—N/a
Mega Drive Fan	—N/a	—N/a	—N/a	17.26/30	—N/a	—N/a
MegaTech	—N/a	—N/a	—N/a	81%	—N/a	—N/a
Oh!X	—N/a	—N/a	—N/a	—N/a	10/10	—N/a
PC Engine Fan	—N/a	24.37/30	—N/a	—N/a	—N/a	—N/a
Power Play	—N/a	82/100	—N/a	80%	—N/a	—N/a
Sega Force	—N/a	—N/a	—N/a	71%	—N/a	—N/a
Sega Power	—N/a	—N/a	—N/a	3/5	—N/a	—N/a
Sega Pro	—N/a	—N/a	—N/a	87/100	—N/a	—N/a
Tilt	—N/a	17/20	—N/a	14/20	—N/a	—N/a
VideoGame	—N/a	—N/a	3/5	—N/a	—N/a	—N/a
Video Games	—N/a	—N/a	—N/a	80%	—N/a	—N/a
Awards
Publication(s)			Award(s)			
Gamest (1991)			The Best Game #42			
Gamest Mook (1998)			Best Shooting Award 4th Annual Hit Game 9th Pure Shooting Award			

According to Masahiro Yuge and Tatsuya Uemura, Twin Cobra proved to be a popular hit for Toaplan, though Flying Shark was "the biggest" hit for them. In Japan, Game Machine listed it on their 1 January 1988 issue as being the fourth most-successful table arcade unit of the month, outperforming titles such as Thundercade and Rainbow Islands: The Story of Bubble Bobble 2. It went on to become Japan's highest-grossing arcade conversion kit of 1988.

Computer and Video Games reviewer Clare Edgeley gave an overall positive outlook to the arcade original.

== Legacy ==
A sequel, Twin Cobra II, was originally under development by Toaplan but the studio closed down in 1994 until Taito allowed Toaplan offshoot Takumi Corporation to finish work on the project as their first release in 1995, before being ported to Sega Saturn in 1997 under the name Kyukyoku Tiger II Plus. Former Seibu Kaihatsu artist Toshinobu Komazawa claimed that Seibu borrowed ideas from Twin Cobra when developing Raiden. Artist Perry "Gryzor/Rozyrg" Sessions cited Twin Cobra as one of the main influences for Super XYX. The rights to Twin Cobra and many other IPs from Toaplan are now owned by Tatsujin, a company named after Truxton's Japanese title that was founded in 2017 by former Toaplan employee Masahiro Yuge, and is part of Embracer Group since 2022.
