= DoReMi Fantasy =

1996 video game

DoReMi Fantasy: Milon's DokiDoki Adventure
- Developer: Hudson Soft
- Publisher: Hudson Soft
- Director: Yukiko Mikami
- Producers: Shigeki Fujiwara; Takeshi Sawaguchi
- Designers: Tadayuki Kawada; Koji Innami
- Programmers: Yasuhiro Kosaka; Atsuo Nagata; Tetsuharu Takashima
- Artists: Shoji Mizuno; Naoto Yoshimi; Kozue Satoh
- Composer: Jun Chikuma
- Platform: Super Famicom
- Release: JP: March 22, 1996
- Genre: Platform
- Mode: Single-player

DoReMi Fantasy: Milon's DokiDoki Adventure is a 1996 platform game by Hudson Soft for the Super Famicom. It was released in Japan as a sequel to Milon's Secret Castle (1986) and was later re-released for the Virtual Console in 2008.

== Gameplay ==
In-game screenshot

DoReMi Fantasy is somewhat different from the original Milon's Secret Castle. This game is more of a straight platformer, while its predecessor combined platforming with puzzles and exploration, yet elements of the first title still remain.

The game also has a more lighthearted and whimsical tone than the original. It no longer takes place at a dark castle with multiple rooms, but in several thematic areas spread within seven worlds, which are displayed on a world map. Each world is divided by a few levels that must be cleared one after another, with a boss at the end. Before each boss battle, Milon must explore a dark fort/outpost which retains most of the first game's elements, with each one being a large open stage requiring exploration to uncover new areas, find a hidden key and unlock the exit.

Milon's basic attack still consists of bubbles, although they are now used to trap enemies in them first and knock them away before they can escape. Like in the first game, Milon's bubbles can be used to destroy soft blocks to open secret areas and paths throughout the levels or uncover hidden items.

There are other, more powerful attack techniques and various powerups that are able to enhance Milon's bubble-blowing, such as ones which increase his range or the number of bubbles he can blow in one interval.

Unlike in the first title, Milon can now jump on enemies and stun them. This is temporary, and using bubbles is the only method of properly defeating them.

Milon's health level is reflected by the clothes he is wearing. If he has not been touched, his clothes are colored green. When he is hit, his clothes will change to blue, and later, red. If he is touched while wearing red, the player loses a life. The player is able to restore health by picking up overalls. One pair of overalls restores a single unit of health, while twin overalls restore two. Unlike the first game, dying once does not necessarily mean game over, as the player can collect extra lives. Milon can collect a variety of items to aid him throughout the level. These include winged boots that allow him to slow his descent by holding the B button in midair, and bubblegum which will save him from a fall down a bottomless pit, but is consumed after it is used.

== Plot ==
In the game, Milon is a young boy whose mission is to restore the music from the forest of his hometown and rescue his friend, the fairy Alis, from an evil wizard known as Amon responsible for the music's disappearance. To do this, he must collect a series of magic instruments that are being held by Amon's strongest minions, but said instruments have had their power locked away after Amon corrupted them. This means Milon must also collect stars to purify the instruments.

== Development and release ==
The game is a sequel to Milon's Secret Castle (1986). The art director for the game was Shoji Mizuno (character designer of the Bomberman series).

It was released in Japan on March 22, 1996. The game has become a rare sought after collector's item. It was later re-released for the Wii's Virtual Console in North America in March 2008 and in Europe in September. The re-release was untranslated with Japanese text.

== Reception ==
Reception

Review scores
Publication	Score
Eurogamer	(VC) 8/10
Famitsu	(SFC) 6/10, 6/10, 6/10, 5/10
IGN	(VC) 7.5/10
Nintendo Life	(VC) 9/10

Famitsu's four reviewers gave it an average outlook. It received a 19.1 out of 30 score in a public poll taken by Family Computer Magazine. IGN's Lucas M. Thomas gave it a score of 7.5 out of 10. Nintendo Life's Darren Calvert gave it a 9 out of 10. Eurogamer's Dan Whitehead gave it an 8 out of 10.
