= Milon no Hoshizora Shabon: Puzzle Kumikyoku =

2006 video game

- Developer(s): Takumi Corporation
- Publisher(s): Hudson Soft
- Composer(s): Yasushi Kaminishi
- Series: Milon's Secret Castle
- Platform(s): Nintendo DS
- Release: JP: July 6, 2006
- Genre(s): Puzzle
- Mode(s): Single-player, multiplayer

Milon no Hoshizora Shabon: Puzzle Kumikyoku (ミロンのほしぞらしゃぼん パズル組曲(くみきょく), lit. "Milon of Soap Starry Skies: The Puzzle's Suite) is a Milon's Secret Castle's puzzle game released for the Nintendo DS on July 6, 2006, only in Japan. It was developed by Takumi Corporation and published by Hudson Soft.

== Story ==
Milon and his friends were having fun until Ochiai appears to make fun of them, starting the rivalry with Milon.

== Gameplay ==
Similar to Puzzle Bobble games, the game consists on popping the bubbles of the same color, but each bubble color group requires a specific placing to be popped:

- Blue: A vertical line of 3 or more.
- Red: A horizontal line of 3 or more.
- Yellow: A complete 2X2 square.

Each character have different walking speed, bubble speed, scores for combos and scores for eliminate the most bubbles at the same time.

== Reception ==
On release, Famicom Tsūshin scored the game a 25 out of 40.
