= Milon's Secret Castle =

1986 video game

- North American NES cover art
- Developer: Hudson Soft
- Publisher: Hudson Soft
- Composers: Takeaki Kunimoto, Daisuke Inoue (NES); Akihiro Akamatsu, Sachiko Oita (Game Boy)
- Platforms: NES/Famicom, Game Boy
- Release: NES/Famicom: JP: November 13, 1986; NA: September 1988; Game Boy: JP: March 26, 1993; NA: March 1993
- Genres: Action, puzzle
- Mode: Single-player

Milon's Secret Castle, known in Japan as Meikyū Kumikyoku: Milon no Daibōken (迷宮組曲 ミロンの大冒険, "The Maze Suite: Milon's Great Adventure"), is a 1986 action-adventure game released by Hudson Soft for the NES. A Game Boy version was released in 1993.

A sequel, DoReMi Fantasy, was released in 1996 for the Super Famicom.

== Plot ==
The protagonist of the game is Milon, a boy who suffers from tone deafness. Milon lived in Hudson land, where its denizens communicate with each other using tone. Milon then decides to travel throughout the land of Hudson. Before leaving for his trip, Milon visits Queen Eliza who lives in Castle Garland. However, when Milon arrives at castle Garland, the castle is already invaded by an evil wizard named Maharito (Warlord of the northern region in the English game manual) and his demonic army. They are terrorizing Hudson, seizing the people's instruments of music, and occupying the castle. In response to this situation, Milon decides to enter the castle to fight the invaders, rescue the queen, and return the musical instruments seized by the forces of Maharito from the people of Hudson.

There are seven total enemy bosses including Maharito himself that players need to beat to finish this game. Aside from Maharito, the other six bosses are collectively called, "Demon Beast"(魔獣). Those Demon Beasts are named: Homa(ホーマ), Doma(ドーマ), Blue Doma(バルカーマ), Red Homa(ブルードーマ), Red Balkarma(レッドバルカーマ), and Kama(カーマ). Upon defeat, each boss drops a crystal which upgrades Milon's power.

== Gameplay ==
Screenshot of the NES/Famicom version of Milon's Secret Castle

The player controls Milon by running, jumping and shooting bubbles. The player starts out at the bottom floor of a four-story castle, named Castle Garland, and must navigate upward, searching the three main stories, the well, two side towers and the very top. If the player remains outside of the castle for too long, lightning bolts start falling from the sky. Each room of the castle contains many enemies and hidden items. Milon's bubbles are both a weapon and a tool; throwing bubbles at soft blocks causes them to break apart and either create additional routes, reveal hidden shops, or expose specific items. The bubbles can also destroy the demons that inhabit the given rooms, though they will come back to life after several seconds. Each story can only be reached by defeating the first boss. Although seemingly basic, the only way the bosses can be reached is by finding a host of secrets, some of which require sheer luck or a helpful manual. This is because there is no visual difference between these "soft blocks" hiding the secrets and the "hard blocks" which are just walls. When a demon-monster dies, it stays dead and releases a crystal ball and, at times, make Milon's bubbles larger and causes them to fly out further. The demon-monster's room can then be used to reach the next story of the castle. Throughout the entire game, the player is only given one life. When that life is lost, the game ends and the player must start over. If the player holds left on the control pad while pressing the Start button on the title screen, they can return to where they left off. This command does not work before collecting the first crystal ball.

Along the way, Milon will come across various items found in shops; some shops are in plain sight, some are hidden in the differing rooms or outside the castle, and some can be found after Milon defeats a certain demon-monster boss. Every item augments Milon in one specific way or another, although not all of them are found in shops.

The game has generally been considered by several gamers to be extremely difficult and frustrating. There are no save points, and once the player dies, the game is over, but it is possible to continue after obtaining the first crystal ball. Unlike in most platform games of the era, Milon does not "blink" to become briefly invincible when he is attacked by an enemy, which means his energy can be sapped very quickly if he does not move away. This is offset by the fact that each room in the castle has a "honeycomb" which restores the player's life bar entirely and extends it by one unit.

The game has an unorthodox approach when compared to other 2D platformers; the rooms can be accessed in any order, and the rooms themselves do not flow like traditional platformer stages. In each room, there is only one exit, which is in a fixed spot within the room. Navigating a castle's room does not always require simply running from left to right, which gives each room a free-flowing feel. Each room of the castle contains secrets similar to those of the Super Mario Bros. series; the secrets are uncovered by shooting bubbles into invisible trigger objects and breaking soft blocks.

=== Maze Song ===
A cumulative side quest involves finding music boxes. By touching a music box, Milon is transported to a minigame where he attempts to pick up as many musical notes as possible, with extra points given for sharps and negative points given for accidentally picking up flats. The first time the player reaches the minigame, only one elf with a drum appears to play the music. Each time the player collects a music box and is transported to the minigame, a new elf with a new instrument appears, and the song gets more elaborate.

== Release ==
Milon's Secret Castle was released for the Famicom (Japan) on November 13, 1986 and later for the Nintendo Entertainment System (North America) in September 1988.

While the Game Boy port kept the same title as the NES version's in the US, the game was released in Japan on March 26, 1993 under the name Milon no Meikyū Kumikyoku (ミロンの迷宮組曲, Milon's Maze Suite) and later in North America. The Game Boy port includes several differences such as the inclusion of a password feature. The room sizes are not as large, which means that many hidden items and platforms are not in the same absolute position, though they can be found in roughly the same relative position. Every item costs less money than the NES version. Bosses send only one projectile out at a time, and the projectiles are much smaller. The ending has new illustrations added to it.

The NES version was re-released in 2005 as part of a compilation on the Game Boy Advance known as Hudson Best Collection Vol. 3. The same version of the game was also released to mobile phones, the Japan-exclusive Hudson Channel for the PS2 and the Wii's Virtual Console service in Japan and North America in 2007 and in the PAL region as an import release in 2010. It was also released on October 31, 2013 on the Nintendo 3DS's Virtual Console service.

== Reception ==
Reception

Review scores
Publication	Score		
Publication	Game Boy	NES	Wii
Electronic Gaming Monthly	6/10, 7/10, 6/10, 5/10	N/A	N/A
Famitsu	N/A	29/40	N/A
GameSpot	N/A	N/A	2/10
IGN	N/A	N/A	4/10
Nintendo Life	N/A	N/A	3/10

Upon release in 1986, Famicom Tsūshin (Famitsu) magazine gave the original Famicom version a score of 29 out of 40. The Wii Virtual Console version released in 2007 later received a negative reception. GameSpot's reviewer Frank Provo described the game as one of the worst games, as he criticized the control scheme, giving it a "terrible" and score of 2.0/10. Power Unlimited gave the Game Boy version a score of 83%; they noted the game lacking originality, but they praised its gameplay and graphics.

== Legacy ==
In 1996, a Super Famicom sequel to the game was released only in Japan, known as DoReMi Fantasy: Milon no Dokidoki Daibouken.

There are some references to Milon's Secret Castle in a few Hudson Soft games. Milon made a cameo appearance in the Sega Saturn game Saturn Bomberman, and in Star Soldier there are hidden Milon tiles that can only be uncovered and destroyed for a 40,000-point bonus when certain score conditions are met.

In 2006, a Nintendo DS puzzle game was released only in Japan under the title Milon no Hoshizora Shabon: Puzzle Kumikyoku.

Milon's Secret Castle was one of the video games based on Manga titled Famicom Rocky from 1985 to 1987 and Nekketsu! Famicom Shounendan from 1986 to 1987 published by Coro Coro Comics.
