= 19XX: The War Against Destiny =

1995 video game

- Developer: Capcom
- Publisher: Capcom
- Designers: Shinichiro Obata; Tomonori Nonaka; Yoichiro Ikeda
- Programmers: Hideo Sako; Tatsumi Kimoto; Tomohiro Ueno
- Artists: Eizi Murabayashi; Gorō Suzuki; Hiroshi Sugiyama
- Composers: Shun Nishigaki; Tatsuro Suzuki
- Series: 194X
- Platform: Arcade
- Release: JP: January 1996; NA: March 1996
- Genre: Vertically scrolling shooter
- Modes: Single-player, multiplayer
- Arcade system: CP System II

19XX: The War Against Destiny is a 1996 vertically scrolling shooter video game developed and published by Capcom for arcades. The story takes place before a fictional 20th-century war as a lone pilot tries to defeat an entire army and evil organization from starting another World War, which soon escalates to a nuclear apocalypse.

This game is the fourth in a series of World War II vertical shooters published by Capcom, and is the last game in the series to be developed directly by Capcom. The first game in the series, 1942, is on the Capcom Z80 platform, while the next two, 1943: The Battle of Midway, and 1941: Counter Attack run on the Capcom Commando and CPS-1 hardware respectively. These were released from 1984 to 1990. The CPS-2 platform allows 19XX to have an art style different from that of previous games. It is followed by 1944: The Loop Master in 2000.

== Gameplay ==
A Lockheed P-38 Lightning fight against the Raimei, a Super Giant Battleship

The player selects one of three different planes, each with different ratings in speed, power, and the strength of their homing attack. When flying through the stages, three primary weapons can be used by picking up their respective items, to fire either spreading vulcan bullets, straight-firing lasers, or multi-directional missiles. By holding button 1, the player can charge a blaster shot. If this shot hits a large enemy, the player will automatically lock on to that enemy, and can fire fast-homing laser shots to damage it further. There is a supply of smart bombs which can be used to clear away the majority of enemies and their projectiles from the screen. Smart bombs can also be charged up, and each level of charge yields a different effect. If the player is shot down while charging up a bomb, the bomb does not go off.

At the end of every level, the player receives additional points for the number of bombs held in stock, a rank increase of 1-5 for the percentage of enemies destroyed, a grade for the time it took to defeat the boss, and a bonus for every medal collected which is multiplied by the rank. After beating the last level, the player also gets a large bonus for the number of lives they have remaining.

== Development ==
19XX: The War Against Destiny was developed by Capcom.

== Release ==
19XX: The War Against Destiny was ported to GameTap. In February 2021, it was included as part of pack 3 in the Capcom Arcade Stadium compilation.

== Reception ==
Reception

Review scores
Publication	Score
Next Generation	3/5
Player One	87%
Super Game Power	4.2/5.0

In Japan, Game Machine listed 19XX: The War Against Destiny in the February 15, 1996 issue as being the tenth most-popular arcade game at the time. A reviewer for Next Generation commented that "its clean looking animation, multilevel backgrounds, digitized explosions, and various streams of patterned enemies place 19XX among the cream of the crop". He found that the varied methods of attack set it apart from other shooters. However, Retro Gamer's Stuart Campbell regarded it as one of the worst shooters from Capcom.
