= Twin Cobra II =

1995 video game

- Developer: Takumi
- Publisher: Taito
- Programmers: Masahiro Yuge; Takayuki Chiba
- Artists: Masanori Ōse; Sōji Komada; Takayoshi Kusaka
- Composer: Takashi Furukawa
- Series: Tiger
- Platforms: Arcade, Saturn
- Release: Arcade: JP: November 1995; Saturn: JP: 18 December 1997
- Genre: Scrolling shooter
- Modes: Single-player, multiplayer
- Arcade system: Taito F3 System

Twin Cobra II (Note: Also known as Kyukyoku Tiger II (Japanese: 究極タイガーII, Hepburn: Kyūkyoku Taigā Tsū; lit. "Ultimate Tiger II") in Japan.) is a vertically scrolling shooter arcade video game developed by Takumi Corporation and published in 1995 by Taito in Japan, Asia and Europe. It is the sequel to Twin Cobra from 1987. Taking place after the events of the previous game, players assume the role of two pilots taking control of their respective attack helicopters to overthrow the returning enemy forces.

Twin Cobra II was originally under development by Toaplan but the studio closed down in 1994. Taito allowed Toaplan offshoot Takumi Corporation to finish work on the project as their first release. Initially launched for the arcades, the game was later received a conversion for the Sega Saturn by Naxat Soft and published exclusively in Japan on 18 December 1997 under the name Kyukyoku Tiger II Plus, featuring changes and additions compared with the original version.

Twin Cobra II has been met with mixed critical reception from critics and reviewers alike since its release on the Saturn as an import title.

== Gameplay ==
Arcade screenshot

Twin Cobra II is a military-themed vertically scrolling shoot 'em up game that plays similarly to the previous Twin Cobra, where players take control of their respective attack helicopter through six levels in order to defeat the returning enemy forces. The title initially appears to be very standard, as players control their craft over a constantly scrolling background and the scenery never stops moving until a helipad is reached. Players also have only two weapons at their disposal: the main gun that travels a max distance of the screen's height and three bombs capable of obliterating any enemy caught within its blast radius. Like most other Toaplan games, non-Japanese versions have a lower difficulty level.

There are three types of weapons in the game that can be switched between after destroying incoming carriers by picking up color-changing "P" icons, ranging from the balanced "Red-Fang", the wide-area "Blue-Smasher" and a powerful green shot unique to each player side. The blue helicopter (1P) is controlled by a male pilot and the "Thunder-Claw", while the red helicopter (2P) is controlled by a female pilot and the "Binchou-Laser". Red and blue weapons require pressing the shoot button rapidly for more firepower; green weapons do not. Players can convert normal bomb stocks to powerful "Hyper Bomb" by collecting "B" icons after reaching the full five stock of them.

There are multiple scoring methods for reaching high-scores to obtain extra lives in the game apart from destroying enemies, which are awarded by reaching certain score thresholds. Points can be gained from collecting stars that increase their value after grabbing them. Dying resets the star's value back to their original state. The game employs a respawn system where in which a downed single player will start off immediately at the location they died at. Getting hit by enemy fire will result in losing a live, as well as a penalty of decreasing the ship's firepower to its original state and once all lives are lost, the game is over unless the player inserts more credits into the arcade machine to continue playing. Unlike previous shoot 'em ups titles from Toaplan, there are no additional loops after completing the last stage.

== Development and release ==
Twin Cobra II was originally under development by Toaplan but the company closed their doors in 1994 until Taito allowed Takumi Corporation, an offshoot of Toaplan, to finish work on the project as their first release. Masahiro Yuge and Takayuki Chiba acted as the game's programmers. Masanori Ōse alongside several artists were responsible for the pixel art. Takashi Furukawa served as composer for the soundtrack under the alias "BLASTMAN-F".

Twin Cobra II was released in arcades on 30 November 1995, using the Taito F3 System board. An album was co-published exclusively in Japan by Scitron and Pony Canyon in May 1996, featuring an arranged song composed by Furukawa. In December 1997, Twin Cobra II was ported to the Sega Saturn by Naxat Soft under the title Kyukyoku Tiger II Plus, featuring an exclusive Saturn Mode with a new stage and other additions.

== Reception ==
Reception

Review scores
Publication	Score
Famitsu	(Saturn) 58 / 100
Joypad	(Saturn) 25%
Saturn Fan	(Saturn) 5.3/10
Sega Saturn Magazine (JP)	(Saturn) 4.66 / 10

In Japan, Game Machine listed Twin Cobra II on their March 15, 1996 issue as being the thirteenth most popular arcade game at the time. The game has been met with mixed critical reception from critics and reviewers alike since its release on the Sega Saturn as Kyukyoku Tiger II Plus.
