= 1941: Counter Attack =

1990 video game

- Japanese arcade flyer
- Developer: Capcom (Note: Ported to SuperGrafx by Hudson Soft)
- Publishers: Arcade: JP/NA: Capcom; EU: Electrocoin; SuperGrafx: JP: Hudson Soft
- Director: Yoshiki Okamoto
- Designers: Akira Nishitani; Noritaka Funamizu; Toshihiko Uda
- Programmer: Yoshihiro Shindome
- Artists: Akemi Kurihara; Akira Yasuda; Sadaki Matsumoto
- Composer: Hiromitsu Takaoka
- Series: 194X
- Platforms: Arcade, SuperGrafx
- Release: Arcade: JP: February 1990; NA: May 1990; EU: 1990; SuperGrafx: JP: 23 August 1991
- Genre: Vertically scrolling shooter
- Modes: Single-player, multiplayer
- Arcade system: CP System

1941: Counter Attack is a 1990 vertically scrolling shooter video game developed and published by Capcom for arcades. It is the prequel to 1942, and the third game in the 194X series. A conversion for the SuperGrafx was published in 1991.

1941: Counter Attack is included in Capcom Classics Collection Remixed for the PlayStation Portable and Capcom Classics Collection Vol. 2 for PlayStation 2 and Xbox. It was followed by 19XX: The War Against Destiny in 1996.

== Gameplay ==
Arcade version screenshot.

The goal is to shoot down enemy airplanes and collect weapon power-ups (POW). The game uses a vitality system instead of life system in which if the player is hit, it loses one point of vitality and the player is destroyed if hit with 0 vitality then the player is given the option to continue. Lightning attacks can be used by pressing the B button which sacrifices a portion of life energy. Three loops can be performed per level and a bonus is awarded at the end of the level for unused loops. Player 1 uses a P-38 Lightning and Player 2 uses a new plane: DH.98 Mosquito. The game shifts from the original Pacific Front setting with that of the Western Front, in the north Atlantic Ocean.

It is the first shoot 'em up to add +1 to the score when a continue is used.

== Release ==
1941: Counter Attack was first released in arcades by Capcom and Electrocoin in 1990, running on the CP System board. In February 2021, it was re-released in pack 2 of the Capcom Arcade Stadium compilation for Nintendo Switch.

== Reception ==
Reception

Review scores
| Publication | Score |
|---|---|
| AllGame | (AC) 3/5 |
| Consoles + | (SG) 83% |
| Famitsu | (SG) 7/10, 7/10, 8/10, 6/10 |
| Gekkan PC Engine | (SG) 85/100, 85/100, 70/100, 85/100, 85/100 |
| Joypad | (SG) 83% |
| Joystick | (SG) 88% |
| Marukatsu PC Engine | (SG) 7/10, 8/10, 8/10, 7/10 |
| Player One | (SG) 85% |
| Génération 4 | (SG) 86% |
| Hippon Super! | (SG) 6/10 |

Award
| Publication | Award |
|---|---|
| Gamest Mook (1998) | (AC) Best Shooting Award 5th, Annual Hit Game 20th |

In Japan, Game Machine listed 1941: Counter Attack in its March 15, 1990 issue as the third most popular arcade game of the month. The game garnered positive reception from reviewers and awards from Gamest magazine. However, the original arcade version had mixed reception from western publications. In contrast, the SuperGrafx conversion had very positive reception from Japanese critics. Readers of PC Engine Fan voted to give the SuperGrafx version a 19.44 out of 30 score, ranking at the number 368 spot in a poll.
