= Kick harness =

Arcade game machine connector

The kick harness, also known as the extra harness or plus harness, is a set of additional connectors that allow arcade PCBs to have extra inputs beyond what the JAMMA wiring standard allows. A typical JAMMA PCB supports only 1 joystick and 3 buttons each for 2 players. JAMMA boards that require this extra harness are referred to as JAMMA+ or JAMMA Plus boards.

The kick harness is named for its most ubiquitous use in arcades: the additional kick buttons in the game Street Fighter II. Many games, especially fighting games, have adopted similar button layouts. Harnesses for games that do not employ kick buttons, such as trackball and driving games, are still commonly referred to as kick harnesses.

The harness connects directly to the PCB, having its own ground loop and power connection. In the case of Capcom's CPS-2 system board, the kick harness is a 34-pin connector that plugs into the side of the 'A' Board.

Unlike JAMMA inputs, kick harnesses have not been standardized. Even PCBs requiring functionally identical inputs may require different wiring. For example, Street Fighter II and Super Street Fighter II have the same control panel layout, and are both produced by Capcom, but they have different pinouts due to the configuration of their respective CPS-1 and CPS-2 system boards.

== See also ==
- JAMMA
