= 1944: The Loop Master =

2000 video game

- Japanese arcade flyer
- Developer: Raizing
- Publisher: Capcom
- Series: 194X
- Platform: Arcade
- Release: JP: September 2000; NA: 2000
- Genre: Scrolling shooter
- Modes: Single-player, multiplayer
- Arcade system: CP System II

1944: The Loop Master is a 2000 vertically scrolling shooter video game developed by Raizing and published by Capcom for arcades. It is the fifth installment of Capcom's 194X series. The game takes place in the heated battles of 1944 during World War II as two super ace pilots, P-38 Lightning and Mitsubishi A6M Zero are attempting to defeat an entire army. It is the sequel to 19XX: The War Against Destiny and uses the arcade cabinet CP System II.

== Gameplay ==
Gameplay screenshot

The arcade operates and plays like most standard shooters. The objective of every level is to shoot enemy planes, tanks, trains, turrets, battleships, and defeat the boss after each level. Unlike its predecessor, 19XX: The War Against Destiny, the game plays more like the early games in the series. Despite the opening description of the plane stats, both planes operate equally, and are only available to the first or second player respectively. The game borrows from 19XX in that it has a form of charge up system. By holding the fire button down, the charge bar will fill, and when full, the plane will fly up and become temporarily invincible. The game also has the standard bomb button, which causes Tomahawk Missiles to fly up the screen doing major damage to any enemies they hit.

The health system in the game also works unlike the previous games in the series. The plane has a health bar which decreases after every hit, but players start with only one life, and the game sparingly gives health boosts.

=== Wingmen ===
The option of wingmen is much more present in this game than others in the series. A small golden plane icon flies down the screen at certain times which releases a wingmen icon. Wingmen add some extra firepower, but are vulnerable to enemy fire.

Beginning with stage 8, wingmen fire laser shots.

=== Stages ===
There are 15 stages in this game.

As an arcade board option, Stage select allows the player to start the game at stage 1, 6, or 11. If stage layout is set to endless, the player can also choose round number 1, 2, or 3, with a higher round being more difficult.

During any boss battle, there is an invisible time limit for each battle. The mission is failed when there is at least one core among all boss units are not destroyed within the time limit. Mission failure does not change game progress, but it prevents the player from getting the stage clear bonus. Bosses include Nagi, a high speed destroyer, Akane, a prototype attacker, and Kai, an anti-submarine battle cruiser. After destroying the stage 15 boss Appare Toride, the game ends if the stage layout is set to 1 loop, or the game continues to stage 1 with enemies firing more rapidly if the stage layout is set to endless.

== Release ==
In 2021, the game was included as part of pack 3 in the Capcom Arcade Stadium compilation for Nintendo Switch.

== Reception ==
In Japan, Game Machine listed 1944: The Loop Master on their November 15, 2000 issue as being the thirteenth most-successful arcade game of the month.
