= Giga Wing 2 =

2000 video game

- North American cover art
- Developer: Takumi Corporation
- Publisher: Capcom
- Director: Makoto Maeda
- Producers: Yukikazu Ozaki; Tatsuya Minami
- Artist: Kei Toume
- Composer: Yasushi Kaminishi
- Platforms: Arcade, Dreamcast
- Release: Arcade: JP: 2000; Dreamcast: JP: January 18, 2001; NA: May 16, 2001
- Genre: Manic shooter
- Modes: Single player, multiplayer
- Arcade system: Sega NAOMI

Giga Wing 2 (ギガウイング2, Giga Uingu Tsū) is a 2000 vertical scrolling shooter arcade game developed by Takumi and published by Capcom on Sega's NAOMI arcade system board and later ported in 2001 to the Dreamcast console. The arcade version is notable both for its excessive scores (scores in the quintillions are not unheard of), and for using a horizontally aligned monitor (much like Treasure Co. Ltd's Radiant Silvergun), something that is considered rare for a vertical shooter.

== Dreamcast version ==
It added score attack mode, 4-player mode, gallery mode, online ranking features. Online ranking service was ended on 10 December 2003.

== Soundtrack ==
The soundtrack to Giga Wing 2 was released on CD, bundled with the soundtrack to Mars Matrix, both composed by the Japanese composer Yasushi Kaminishi -上西 泰史- (上西泰史). The music is exclusively orchestral, with a chaotic sound to provide atmosphere to the war-torn world in which the game takes place.

== Reception ==
Reception

Aggregate score
Aggregator	Score
Metacritic	70/100

Review scores
Publication	Score
Edge	6/10
Electronic Gaming Monthly	6/6.5/8
Famitsu	27/40
GameRevolution	B
GameSpot	7/10
GameSpy	9/10
IGN	5/10

In Japan, Game Machine listed Giga Wing 2 on their March 1, 2001 issue as being the most-successful arcade game of the month.

The Dreamcast version received "average" reviews, a bit more positive than the first Giga Wing, according to the review aggregation website Metacritic. Game Revolution called it "a good game. For a mere $20, you get plenty of mindless old-school fun, albeit for a relatively short time". GameSpot said: "You'd be hard-pressed to find a more visually impressive shooter on the Dreamcast, and the game is highly playable to boot". In Japan, Famitsu gave it a score of 27 out of 40.
