= JoJo's Bizarre Adventure (video game) =

1998 video game

- Flyer for the original arcade game, which was released as JOJO's Venture outside Japan
- Developer: Capcom
- Publishers: Capcom; PlayStation, Dreamcast: JP/NA: Capcom; PAL: Virgin Interactive
- Producer: Kouji Nakajima
- Designers: Shinichiro Obata; Yoshifumi Fukuda; Mamoru Ōhashi; Koji Shimizu
- Composers: Yūko Takehara; Setsuo Yamamoto
- Series: JoJo's Bizarre Adventure
- Engine: CP System III
- Platforms: Arcade, PlayStation, Dreamcast, PlayStation 3, Xbox 360
- Release: December 1998: Arcade; JP: December 1998; NA: February 1999; EU: 1999 Heritage for the Future; JP: September 1999 PlayStation; JP: October 14, 1999; NA: April 10, 2000; UK: May 19, 2000 Dreamcast; JP: November 25, 1999; NA/UK: April 28, 2000 PlayStation 3; JP/NA: August 21, 2012; EU: August 22, 2012 Xbox 360 August 22, 2012
- Genre: Fighting
- Modes: Single-player, multiplayer
- Arcade system: CP System III

JoJo's Bizarre Adventure (Note: Japanese: ジョジョの奇妙な冒険, Hepburn: JoJo no Kimyō na Bōken) is a 1998 fighting video game developed and published by Capcom, based on Hirohiko Araki's manga of the same title. It was originally released for arcades on the CP System III (CPS-3) board; this version was known outside Japan as JOJO's Venture. An updated version of the game was released in 1999 as JoJo's Bizarre Adventure: Heritage for the Future (ジョジョの奇妙な冒険 未来への遺産, JoJo no Kimyō na Bōken Mirai e no Isan), being the sixth and last game released for the CPS-3 board. Ports for the PlayStation and Dreamcast were also released that year. A high-definition version of the game was released digitally for PlayStation 3 and Xbox 360 in August 2012.

The game was developed by the same team responsible for the Street Fighter III series, and combines Capcom's anime-inspired graphics, as seen in the Darkstalkers series, with the colorful characters and events of Hirohiko Araki's creation, resulting in a highly stylized and detailed visual style. It also features many of the gameplay mechanics seen on previous Capcom fighting games, such as the use of power gauges for super moves, as well as a brand new Stand Mode, consisting of the series' signature guardian spirits that accompany almost every character and can be summoned or dismissed at will by the player, resulting in variations in the character's move list and abilities. Araki served as a consultant for the game and created exclusive pieces of artwork for its promotion and packaging; most notably, he developed from scratch a new character design for Midler, since Capcom was interested in using her in the game and she had been only shown from the waist-down in the original manga.

== Plot ==
Based on the manga's third main story arc, Stardust Crusaders, the game follows a Japanese teenager named Jotaro Kujo, who has developed a supernatural ability known as a "Stand". Approached by his grandfather, Joseph Joestar, Jotaro learns that this power is the result of the influence of the sworn enemy of the Joestar family, a vampire named Dio. As his mother's life is put in danger when she starts developing a Stand that she can't control, Jotaro and Joseph go on a quest to destroy Dio so they can cure her.

== Gameplay ==
Gameplay in JoJo's Bizarre Adventure follows most basic fighting games, in which two fighters battle against each other using a variety of attacks, techniques, and special moves to deplete their opponent's health bar. A super meter which increases as fighters deal and receive damage can be used to perform character-specific super moves.

The unique feature of the game is the inclusion of "Stands", powerful projections of a fighter's energy that are unique to each fighter. Whilst Stands are generally integrated into a fighter's moveset, most characters possess an active Stand, which they can bring into and out of battle using the "Stand" button. While a Stand is out, the fighter can increase the power of their attacks, use unique techniques, receive enhancements such as double jumping, and even have their Stand attack separately from the fighter character. However, attacking a fighter's Stand will also cause damage to the fighter, which brings a risk to using Stands, and the damage inflicted is doubled if the Stand is far away from its user. A Stand's presence on the field is determined by a Stand Gauge, which decreases if the Stand is attacked and refills whilst the Stand is withdrawn. If the gauge is depleted, a "Stand Crash" will occur, which leaves the fighter temporarily stunned and open to attack. Other features of Stands include "Blazing Fists" matches, where two Stands clash against each other, requiring the fighters to mash buttons to overcome their opponent, and the ability to program Stands to perform a series of attacks, which can be combined with a player's own attacks for extensive combos. Some characters instead possess "passive" Stands, which are treated as parts of their movesets, and Young Joseph lacks a Stand entirely, relying solely on his non-Stand powers, the Hamon, from the Battle Tendency arc.

Along with general modes such as Versus, the game features Story Mode, a single player campaign which follows each character as they face off against various opponents, loosely following the story of the manga. In between certain matches, unique special stages may occur based on scenes from the manga, such as a side-scrolling sequence in which the player has to find and defeat the assassin N'Doul while avoiding his water-based Stand Geb's attacks, or a special battle against the Death 13 Stand. Super Story Mode is a single-player mode exclusive to the PlayStation port of the game. The mode follows the story of the manga, taking the player through a series of fights as the story progresses. This mode also features various mini-games the player must complete in order to progress, such as driving a car or playing games of chance. The HD versions feature optional graphical filters and online multiplayer.

== Playable characters ==
The original arcade game features 13 playable characters, whilst Heritage for the Future and subsequent ports added nine additional characters, bringing the total to 22. In the English versions, some characters are renamed to avoid copyright infringement in Western territories:

- Alessi (Alessy)
- Black Polnareff (Note: Introduced in Heritage for the Future)
- Chaka (Chaca)
- Devo the Cursed (D'Bo)
- Dio (Note: Boss character)
- Hol Horse and Boingo (Voing)
- Hol Horse
- Iggy (Iggi)
- Jean Pierre Polnareff
- Joseph Joestar
- Jotaro Kujo
- Khan (Kan)
- Mariah (Mahrahia)
- Midler
- Mohammed Avdol
- New Kakyoin
- Noriaki Kakyoin
- Pet Shop
- Rubber Soul (Robber Soul)
- Shadow Dio
- Vanilla Ice (Iced)
- Young Joseph (JoJo)

== Versions ==
=== Arcade ===
JoJo's Bizarre Adventure was initially released for Japanese arcades in December 1998, followed by North America in February 1999. An English-translated version was released in Asia under the shortened title of JOJO's Venture, which predates the officially licensed English adaptations of the original manga and anime (hence the name change). It was followed by a fully revised version titled JoJo's Bizarre Adventure: Heritage for the Future, released in September 1999, which featured eight additional playable characters. An English version that was released in Europe is simply titled JoJo's Bizarre Adventure, the original Japanese title.

=== Console ===
Two console versions were produced. The 1999 PlayStation version is based on JOJO's Venture, but features the additional characters from the second version of the arcade game and an exclusive "Super Story Mode", which covers the entire Stardust Crusaders story arc. The Dreamcast version, also released in 1999, features both the original and revised versions of the arcade game in their original forms. In 2000, an updated version featuring online multiplayer was released for the Dreamcast exclusively in Japan. In 2012, a high-definition port of the Dreamcast version developed by Capcom was released digitally on PlayStation 3 (via PlayStation Network on August 21 and Xbox 360 (via Xbox Live Arcade) the next day. This version's features include graphic filters and online multiplayer, though it does not feature the Super Story Mode of the previous PlayStation port. The game was delisted from the PlayStation Network and Xbox Live Arcade storefronts on September 11, 2014, a few months after the release of All Star Battle.

== Reception ==
Reception

Aggregate scores
| Aggregator | Score | | | |
| Aggregator | Dreamcast | PS | PS3 | Xbox 360 |
|---|---|---|---|---|
| GameRankings | 76% | 74% | 62% | 63% |
| Metacritic | N/A | N/A | 64/100 | 68/100 |

Review scores
| Publication | Score | | | |
| Publication | Dreamcast | PS | PS3 | Xbox 360 |
|---|---|---|---|---|
| CNET Gamecenter | 6/10 | N/A | N/A | N/A |
| Destructoid | N/A | N/A | 5.5/10 | N/A |
| Electronic Gaming Monthly | 7.625/10 (Note: In Electronic Gaming Monthly's early review of the Dreamcast version, one critic gave it 8.5/10, two others gave it each a score of 8/10, and the other gave it 6/10.) | N/A | N/A | N/A |
| Eurogamer | 8/10 | N/A | 7/10 | N/A |
| Game Informer | 8/10 | 8/10 | N/A | N/A |
| GameFan | 85% | 87% | N/A | N/A |
| GameRevolution | N/A | N/A | 4/10 | N/A |
| GameSpot | 8.3/10 | 8/10 | 7/10 | 7/10 |
| GameSpy | 7.5/10 | N/A | N/A | N/A |
| IGN | 8.5/10 | 7/10 | 7/10 | 7/10 |
| Next Generation | N/A | 2/5 | N/A | N/A |
| Official U.S. PlayStation Magazine | N/A | 4.5/5 | N/A | N/A |
| Official Xbox Magazine (US) | N/A | N/A | N/A | 6/10 |
| PlayStation: The Official Magazine | N/A | 3.5/5 | 7/10 | N/A |
| The Digital Fix | N/A | N/A | 5/10 | N/A |

In Japan, Game Machine listed JoJo's Bizarre Adventure as the most successful arcade game of January 1999; the magazine also listed Heritage for the Future as the most successful arcade game of November 1999. It went on to be the third highest-grossing arcade software of 1999 in Japan, below Sega's Virtua Striker 2 and Capcom's own Street Fighter Alpha 3. On home consoles, the game was a best-seller in Japan, having sold more than 300,000 units by March 2000.

The Dreamcast version received favorable reviews, while the PlayStation and HD versions received "mixed or average reviews", according to the review aggregation websites GameRankings and Metacritic.

Scott Steinberg of The Electric Playground gave the Dreamcast and PlayStation versions each a score of 7.5/10, saying that they are "without a doubt the most advanced (and strangest) of Capcom's 2D fighting games, but by no means the most addictive." D. Smith of Gamers' Republic praised the Dreamcast version, calling it the best port of the game. He praised the game's diverse and strange cast of characters, comparing the game's weirdness as comparable to the fighting game Groove on Fight. Although he said the game was "not the most technical of fighters", it can still be a valid alternative to Street Fighter III. Toxic Tommy of GamePro said in its March 2000 issue that the PlayStation version "is best taken as an entertaining change of pace. You won't find it as challenging as other Capcom side-view fighting games, but at least you and your homies should bust a few good laughs during JoJo's wacky combat circus." (Note: GamePro gave the PlayStation version two 4/5 scores for graphics and control, and two 3.5/5 scores for sound and fun factor in an early review.) An issue later, Jake The Snake said of the Dreamcast version: "Fighting-game fans will either love or hate this game's weird characters and attacks, so rent before buying." (Note: GamePro gave the Dreamcast version two 3/5 scores for graphics and sound, 4/5 for control, and 3.5/5 for fun factor.) Edge, however, gave the same console version five out of ten, saying: "Almost every aspect of [the game] is a discourse for the devout. For that reason, this is a title for fanatics alone. Perhaps that was Capcom's intention." Kyle Knight of AllGame gave the same console version two stars out of five, calling it "an interesting game to play, if only for its decidedly odd look and feel. But the game doesn't have the fine-tuning that makes a fighting game last as a permanent part of a fighter fan's collection. The game's good for a few laughs, but not worth it in the long run." Joe Ottoson of the same website gave the PlayStation version two-and-a-half stars, saying that "While greatness may not be in the cards of JoJo this time around, at least he puts up a solid battle against the towers and empresses of the world. The only problem is, he's bound to get lost in the shuffle." Jeff Lundrigan of NextGen in his early review called the same PlayStation version "An oddity for Capcom completionists only." In Japan, Famitsu gave the Dreamcast and PlayStation versions each a score of 31 out of 40.

Alex Rhoades of GameZone gave the HD versions a score of six out of ten, saying that the game "had a chance to shine for its 25th anniversary. Unfortunately the exorbitant price combined with the niche market appeal will doom it from the start. Although the gameplay is nearly untouched from the Dreamcast version, only huge fans of the manga will likely pick this game up." However, Joe Walker of Push Square gave the PS3 version five stars out of ten, saying, "JoJo's Bizarre Adventure HD Ver. is tragic in a way, because while the game itself is still solid and fun to play, there's just too little on offer to justify the price tag."

== See also ==
- JoJo's Bizarre Adventure: All Star Battle
