= Mars Matrix =

2000 video game

Mars Matrix: Hyper Solid Shooting
- Developer: Takumi Corporation
- Publisher: Capcom
- Designer: Kei Toume (character)
- Composer: Yasushi Kaminishi
- Platforms: Arcade, Dreamcast
- Release: Arcade; April 2000; Dreamcast: JP: November 9, 2000; NA: April 30, 2001
- Genre: Scrolling shooter
- Modes: Single-player, multiplayer
- Arcade system: CP System II

Mars Matrix: Hyper Solid Shooting, or simply Mars Matrix (マーズマトリックス, Māzu Matorikkusu), is a 2000 vertically scrolling shooter arcade game developed by Takumi, published by Capcom, and run on their CPS-2 arcade system board. Mars Matrix was later ported to the Dreamcast video game console in 2001. The arcade version uses a horizontally aligned monitor, despite being a vertically scrolling game.

== Plot ==
In 2100, millions of people were starving due to massive food shortages and has caused civil wars around the world. Centuries later, however, the world government had sent colonists to Mars which began to solve these problems. At a nearby farm, the Infinity chip was discovered and it revealed all the technology of the advanced civilization. In 2309, a Declaration of Independence has been sent to Earth. Large armies have been amassed on Mars, and a gigantic armada was waiting for any attack from Earth. The Earth government sends out a fleet of battleships followed by a special air raid unit called ACID; ACID is equipped with a new fighter ship known as the Mosquito. Their mission is to enter Mars, stop the rebel violence, locate and destroy the rebel leader, whoever... or whatever it may be...

== Gameplay ==
Arcade screenshot

=== Controls ===
The game only uses one button, as the triggered actions differ according to the timing with which the button is pressed:

- Normal Shot: Tap A button. Shot power increases with level (max 8), which depends on EXP points.
- Piercing Cannon: By not pressing A button for at least 1 second, press A. The attack has a close range that can hit multiple targets. The attack strength is higher than Normal Shot, and the attack strength increases against target closer to player's fighter. Piercing Cannon's shot power does not change based on level.
- Mosquito: When GHB is full, A button is hold for 1/4 to 1/2 second. A barrier is activated afterwards, which damages contacting enemy. With active barrier, player's fighter is invulnerable, the GHB gauge is drained, and enemy bullets are attracted to player's fighter. Releasing A button while GHB is not empty causes attracted bullet to fire in a direction away from player's fighter when A button is released. A repelled bullet that hits an enemy is converted to cube.
- Gravity Hole Bomb: When GHB is full, A button is hold until GHB gauge is emptied. When activated, an explosion damages all on-screen enemies and destroys all on-screen enemy bullets.

=== Fighter ===
Each fighter has a 10x12 pixel hit box at the front of the unit. Player gains 1 life at 100000 EXP. The fighter can only be destroyed by colliding with enemy bullet, not other objects.

- Mosquito 01: normal speed, wide blaster weapon, lower normal shot damage
- Mosquito 02: high speed, laser shot weapon, higher normal shot damage

=== Items ===
- 1UP: Increases player's life stock by 1.
- Cube: Increases experience, and recharges combo meter. The bigger cube grants longer recharge time.

=== Experience system ===
When player's fighter captures a cube, player's EXP is increased and the combo meter is filled, causing successive captured cubes to have increased EXP and longer recharge time until combo meter is depleted.

Combo meter can be depleted if player's fighter fails to capture a cube for a prolonged time period, or if player's fighter is destroyed.

Cubes can be found by destroying (a portion of) an enemy, or hitting enemy with repelled bullet.

When EXP is sufficiently high, player's level is increased. Increased level causes fighter's normal shot to be more powerful, and increases the number of cubes needed to completely fill combo meter. In addition, higher EXP value causes more points to be rewarded for activities that increase player's score.

=== Stages ===
There are 6 levels in the game each with a boss that you need to destroy in an amount of time and a briefing of the next level:

1. Armed Satellite Phobos

Briefing: We, in order to gain control of the airspace of Manitily, planned to secure Phobos satellite.
Location: Phobos
Boss: Small satellite armed with guns, lasers, and electric mines. Its wings can be shot off.

2. Descending to Mars

Briefing: The Phobos satellite has been secured. We are preparing to execute mission code 008 and are ready to enter the Mars' atmosphere. The entrance point is at 3557. Each unit should move to the attack point at 1200 hours. The next target is Maneris Front Base.
Location: Maneris Front Base
Boss: A Large Tank with cannons and turrets on its treads.

3. Surprise Attack

Briefing: The "ACID" unit that belongs to the Number 201 independent armada is starting to make a front alone. The goal of this mission is to secure Maneris Starport that has been occupied by the rebellion. Since this mission has been classified as extreme, no support will be available.
Location: Maneris Starport
Boss: A giant crustacean mech that deploys seed-like aircraft with different patterns of firing bullets. The head turns into a cannon and the pincers turn into gatling guns when destroyed.

4. Red Sky Project

Briefing: With the success of the last mission, the spaceport has been secured. The decision has been made to alter the next assignment to mission code 075. The ACID unit should assemble with the fleet and destroy the remaining enemy forces. Keep in mind that there is a powerful gravity force high in the mid-Atlantic.
Location: A small rebel armada, Mars Mid-Atlantic.
Boss: A huge command ship known as the Exodus. It can launch from the front a fish-like escape pod.

5. True Darkness

Briefing: The remaining enemy armada and its command ship "EXODUS" has been destroyed. The remaining enemy forces are assumed to be down to 20% approximately. The mission is entering the final phase. Our fleet will remain in orbit backing up the ACID unit while you attack the headquarters of the enemy.
Location: Rebel train station.
Boss: An armored train of 5 cars. 3 cars have a gatling cannon and two doors that bring out turrets, mines, and fighters. The fourth car has several turrets. Inside is a legless mech with two chain guns. The last car is the engine car with arms with bazookas that shoot dozens of electric missiles.

6. Forbidden Fruit

Briefing: None
Location: Rebel Headquarters
Boss: There are three bosses with the same time limit. The first boss is a hovering saucer that can turn into a crustacean or a spiked wheel. The second boss is a control tower. It is between two control units that shoot sprays of missiles. The third boss has two stages. The first stage is a mutant flower that shoots out a seed-like ship and an almost impassable pattern of bullets. The second stage is the sorceress behind the death of the ancient Mars civilization, with a cocoon and skull form until she is destroyed.

At the end of each stage, player gains points based on following criteria:

- Time: Depends on how many seconds left after destroying last boss in the completed stage.
- Level: Depends on the just completed level number.
- Shootdown: Depends on the total points gained by destroying enemy units.

Total Score earned for completing a stage is the sum of points in Time, Level, Shootdown fields.

== Ports ==
The Dreamcast version includes:

- Arcade mode: Plays like the arcade game. Despite the claim of perfect conversion, the base scores for enemy units are different.
- Elite Mode (Arrange Mode): Player can adjust various options such as combo time, ship speed and GHB charge speed. In Elite A mode, enemy ships and formations are changed. In Elite B mode, the stages are same as Arcade mode.
- Score Challenge Mode (Score attack mode): Killing an enemy with piercing cannon causes multitude of cubes to appear. Each cube increases successive cube values by 1.
- Shop system: It allows game options to be unlocked by purchasing them with cubes.
- Strategy modes: It includes a sample replay for each stage where every stage is completed.
- An introduction movie.
- A gallery.
- The bug where player's score cannot go beyond 999,999,999,990 points was fixed by adding 2 extra digits in the score table.

== Soundtrack ==
Mars Matrix & Giga Wing 2 Original Soundtrack Box was released by Suleputer.

== Reception ==
Reception

Aggregate score
Aggregator	Score
Metacritic	78/100

Review scores
Publication	Score
Edge	7/10
Electronic Gaming Monthly	8.5/10
Famitsu	31/40
Game Informer	8/10
GameRevolution	B
GameSpot	6.9/10
GameSpy	8/10
IGN	(US) 8.5/10 (JP) 8/10

The Dreamcast version received "generally favorable reviews" according to the review aggregation website Metacritic. In Japan, Famitsu gave it a score of 31 out of 40.

Also in Japan, Game Machine listed the arcade version in their July 15, 2000 issue as the seventh most-successful arcade game of the year.
