= CP System III =

Arcade system board developed by Capcom

- Manufacturer: Capcom
- Type: Arcade system board
- Released: November 21, 1996
- Discontinued: September 13, 1999
- Media: ROM cartridge; CD-ROM
- CPU: Hitachi SH-2 @ 25 MHz
- Display: Raster (horizontal), 384×224/496×224 resolution, 32768 colors on screen, 16,777,216-color palette
- Input: 8-way joystick, from 3 to 6 buttons
- Predecessor: CP System II

The CP System III (CPシステムIII, CP shisutemu 3), also known as Capcom Play System 3 or CPS-3 for short, is an arcade system board that was the successor to Capcom's CP System and CP System II arcade hardware. It was first used in 1996 with the arcade game Red Earth. It would be the last proprietary system board Capcom would produce before moving on to the Dreamcast-based Naomi platform. The arcade system saw new releases up until mid 1999. Technical support for the CPS-3 ended on February 28, 2019.

Like its forerunners, games can be exchanged without altering the core hardware. The CP System III uses CDs instead of separate daughterboards to store the games on, which are then loaded onto the system's CD drive to be stored into memory to allow for it to be played. Like its predecessor, games are encrypted, and must be decrypted via game-specific security cartridges, which will decrypt the contents stored within the system memory in run time.

== History ==
The CP System III became the final arcade system board to be designed by Capcom. In a change from its predecessors, the CP System III consists of a single board instead of two separate boards; the board itself contains components common to all CP System III games. The games themselves are supplied on a CD instead of a separate daughterboard, which is readable by the provided SCSI CD-ROM drive that connects to the main board. They also came with their own game-specific cartridges that are used in conjunction with the CD. Capcom chose the CD medium in order to keep down the price of the system. The CP System III also improved the number of colors and sprites on screen over its predecessor, the CP System II, and features native sprite scaling capabilities that all games on the system used. In place of the QSound sound chip found in its predecessor, the CP System III has a custom 16-channel stereo sound chip. The system also allowed for supported games to be displayed in widescreen, with Street Fighter III: 2nd Impact being the first and only game to officially support it.

The CP System III features a security mechanism; games are supplied on a CD, which contains the encrypted game contents, and a security cartridge containing the game BIOS and the SH-2 CPU with integrated decryption logic, with the per-game key stored in battery-backed SRAM. When the CP System III board is first powered on, the contents of the CD are loaded into a bank of Flash ROM SIMMs on the motherboard, where it is executed. The program code is then decrypted at run time via the security cartridge. The security cartridge is sensitive to any sort of tampering, which will result in the decryption key being erased and the cartridge being rendered useless. Games become unplayable if the security cartridge has been tampered with or when the battery inside the security cartridge dies. The lone exception is Street Fighter III: 2nd Impact, which uses a default set of decryption keys that are written to dead cartridges on boot, making it the few, if not the only CPS-3 games prevalent after support was dropped, due to its immunity to cartridge tampering or suicide.

In June 2007, the encryption method was reverse-engineered by Andreas Naive, making emulation possible. Later developments led to the eventual bypassing of the suicide and security routines of the games as well as a development of a so-called "super cartridge" capable of running all CPS-3 games.

Capcom ceased manufacturing the CP System III hardware after 1999. Capcom ended most of the technical support for the hardware and its games on March 31, 2015. Battery replacements ended on February 28, 2019, ending all official support of the CP System III hardware and software.

== Specifications ==
- Main CPU: Hitachi HD6417099 (SH-2) at 25 MHz
- RAM:
  - 512 KB Work RAM
  - 512 KB Sprite RAM
  - 8 MB Character RAM
  - 256 KB Color RAM
  - 32 KB SS RAM
- Storage:
  - SCSI CD-ROM drive
  - Flash ROM: Variable amount, up to 8 × 16 MB
- Sound chip: 16-channel 8-bit sample player, stereo
- Maximum color palette: 16 million shades
- Maximum number of colors on screen: 32,768 (15-bit colour, 555 RGB)
  - Palette size: 131,072 pens
  - Colors per tile (backgrounds / sprites): 64 (6 bits per pixel) or 256 (8 bits per pixel), selectable
  - Colors per tile (text overlay): 16 (4 bits per pixel)
- Maximum number of objects: 1024, with hardware scaling
- Scroll faces: 4 regular + 1 text overlay 'score screen' layer
- Scroll features: Horizontal & vertical scrolling, LineScroll, LineZoom
- Framebuffer zooming
- Color blending effects
- Hardware RLE decompression of 6 bpp and 8 bpp graphics through DMA
- Resolution, pixels: 384×224 (standard mode) / 496×224 (widescreen mode)

== List of games (6 games) ==
All six games are developed by Capcom and are all head-to-head fighting games.

English title	Release date	Japanese title
Red Earth	November 21, 1996	War-Zard (ウォーザード)
Street Fighter III: New Generation	February 4, 1997	Street Fighter III (ストリートファイターIII)
Street Fighter III 2nd Impact: Giant Attack	September 30, 1997	Street Fighter III 2nd Impact (ストリートファイターIII 2nd Impact)
JoJo's Bizarre Adventure / JOJO's Venture	December 2, 1998	JoJo no Kimyō na Bōken (ジョジョの奇妙な冒険)
Street Fighter III 3rd Strike: Fight for the Future	May 12, 1999	Street Fighter III 3rd Strike (ストリートファイターIII 3rd Strike)
JoJo's Bizarre Adventure: Heritage for the Future	September 13, 1999	JoJo no Kimyō na Bōken Mirai e no Isan (ジョジョの奇妙な冒険 未来への遺産)

== See also ==
- CP System
- CP System II
