= CP System II =

Arcade system board developed by Capcom

- Manufacturer: Capcom
- Type: Arcade system board
- Released: September 10, 1993
- Discontinued: December 22, 2003
- CPU: Motorola 68000 (@ 16 MHz)
- Display: Raster (horizontal), 384×224 resolution, 4096 colors on screen, 16,777,216-color palette
- Sound: Sound CPU: Z80 (@ 8 MHz); Q-Sound (@ 4 MHz)
- Input: 8-way joystick, from 2 to 6 buttons
- Predecessor: CP System
- Successor: CP System III

The CP System II (CPシステムII, CP shisutemu 2), also known as Capcom Play System 2 or CPS-2 for short, is an arcade system board that was the successor to Capcom's CP System, CP System Dash and Capcom Power System Changer arcade hardware. It was first used in 1993 for Super Street Fighter II and was succeeded by the CP System III hardware in 1996, of which the CPS-2 would outlive by over four years. New releases for the system were produced until the end of 2003, ending with Hyper Street Fighter II. Technical support for the CPS-2 ended on February 28, 2019.

Like its predecessor, games can be exchanged without altering the core hardware. The CP System II uses separate daughterboards enclosed in plastic cases to store both the games and the main board on, which are then put together so that the games can be played. Unlike its predecessor, however, games are encrypted, and must be decrypted via a decryption key stored on the main board's battery-backed memory to run them.

== History ==
Capcom announced the development of the CP System II (or CPS-2) in 1990. They had planned to complete and release the CP System II hardware in 18 months. They also originally had plans for the system to be capable of 3D graphics.

The earlier Capcom system board, the original CP System (or CPS-1), while successful, was very vulnerable to bootleggers making unauthorized copies of games. In order to rectify the situation, Capcom took the CP System hardware (with QSound) with minimal changes and employed encryption on the program ROMs to prevent software piracy. Due to the encryption, the system was never bootlegged until unencrypted program data became available.

The CP System II consists of two separate parts; the A board, which connects to the JAMMA harness and contains components common between all CP System II games, and the B board, which contains the game itself. The relationship between the A and B board is very similar to that between a home video game console and cartridge. CP System II A and B boards are color-coded by region, and each board can only be used with its same-colored mate. The exception to this is that the blue and green boards can be used together.

The B boards hold battery-backed memory containing decryption keys needed for the games to run. As time passes, these batteries lose their charge and the games stop functioning, because the CPU cannot execute any code without the decryption keys. This is generally referred to as a "suicide battery". It is possible to bypass the original battery and swap it out with a new one in-circuit, but this must be done before the original falls below 2V or the keys will be lost. Consequently, the board itself will die after a finite amount of time even if used legally unless a fee was paid to Capcom to repair it.

Due to the heavy encryption, it was believed for a long time that CP System II emulation was next to impossible. However, in January 2001, the CPS-2 Shock group was able to obtain unencrypted program data by hacking into the hardware, which they distributed as XOR difference tables to produce the unencrypted data from the original ROM images, making emulation possible, as well as restoring cartridges that had been erased because of the suicide system.

In January 2007, the encryption method was fully reverse-engineered by Andreas Naive and Nicola Salmoria. It has been determined that the encryption employs two four-round Feistel ciphers with a 64-bit key. The algorithm was thereafter implemented in this state for all known CPS-2 games in MAME.

In April 2016, Eduardo Cruz, Artemio Urbina and Ian Court announced the successful reverse engineering of Capcom's CP System II security programming, enabling the clean "de-suicide" and restoration of any dead games without hardware modifications.

Capcom ceased manufacturing the CP System II hardware on December 22, 2003, with Hyper Street Fighter II being the final game released for the hardware. Capcom ended most of the technical support for the hardware and its games on March 31, 2015. Battery replacements ended on February 28, 2019, ending all official support of the CP System II hardware and software.

== Region colors ==
Region	Case	Version screen
Japan	Green plastic	White text
U.S.A.	Blue plastic	Red text
Euro/Etc./World	Blue plastic	Blue text
Asia	Grey plastic	Yellow text
Hispanic	Orange plastic	Green text
Brazil	Orange plastic	Magenta text
Oceania	Blue plastic	Orange text
Rental (any of above)	Yellow plastic	(Any of above)
(Any of above)	Black metal "all-in-one"	(Any of above)

== Technical specifications ==
- CPU:
  - Primary: Capcom DL-1525 (encrypted 68000) @ 16 MHz
  - Sound: Kabuki DL-030P (encrypted Z80, but encryption not used) or standard Z80 @ 8 MHz
- Capcom custom chipset:
  - GPU: CPS-A & CPS-B Graphics Processors @ 16 MHz (same as CPS-1)
  - Sound chip: Lucent DL-1425 Q1 QSound DSP16A Processor @ 4 MHz
  - DRAM Refresh Controller: DL-2227
  - I/O Controller: DL-1123
- Display:
  - Active resolution: 384×224 pixels
  - Overscan resolution: 512×262 (262 scanlines)
  - Sprites: 900 on screen
- Colors:
  - Depth: 32-bit (RGBA)
  - Palette: 16,777,216 colors (24-bit)
  - Alpha transparency: 256 levels (8-bit)
  - Colors on screen: 4096 (12-bit)
  - Colors per tile: 16 (4-bit)
- RAM: 1328 KB (1 MB FPM DRAM, 304 KB SRAM)
  - A-Board: 1 MB FPM DRAM, 280 KB SRAM (256 KB video, 16 KB I/O, 8 KB sound)
  - B-Board: 16 KB SRAM (2× 8 KB)
  - Communication Board: 8 KB SRAM
- Maximum ROM capacity: 322 Mbit (40.25 MB)
- Dimensions (A+B board pair): 40 x 27 x 8 cm

== List of games (41 games) ==
English title	Release date	Developer	Japanese title	Genre
Super Street Fighter II: The New Challengers; Super Street Fighter II: Tournament Battle	September 9, 1993	Capcom	Super Street Fighter II (スーパーストリートファイターII)	Head-to-Head Fighting Game
Eco Fighters	December 12, 1993	Capcom	Ultimate Ecology (アルティミットエコロジー)	Shoot 'em up
Dungeons & Dragons: Tower of Doom	January 13, 1994	Capcom	Dungeons & Dragons: Tower of Doom (ダンジョンズ&ドラゴンズ タワーオブドゥーム)	Beat 'em up
Super Street Fighter II Turbo	February 23, 1994	Capcom	Super Street Fighter II X: Grand Master Challenge (スーパーストリートファイターIIX)	Head-to-Head Fighting Game
Alien vs. Predator	May 20, 1994	Capcom	Alien VS Predator (エイリアンVSプレデター)	Beat 'em up
Darkstalkers: The Night Warriors	July 5, 1994	Capcom	Vampire: The Night Warriors (ヴァンパイア -The Night Warriors-)	Head-to-Head Fighting Game
Ring of Destruction: Slammasters II	August 8, 1994	Capcom	Super Muscle Bomber: The International Blowout (スーパーマッスルボマー -THE INTERNATIONAL BLOWOUT-)	Head-to-Head Fighting Game
Armored Warriors	September 16, 1994	Capcom	Powered Gear: Strategic Variant Armor Equipment (パワードギア -STRATEGIC VARIANT ARMOR EQUIPMENT-)	Beat 'em up
X-Men: Children of the Atom	December 8, 1994	Capcom	X-Men: Children of the Atom ((X-MEN Children of The Atom))	Head-to-Head Fighting Game
Night Warriors: Darkstalkers' Revenge	March 2, 1995	Capcom	Vampire Hunter: Darkstalkers' Revenge (ヴァンパイアハンター -Darkstalkers' Revenge-)	Head-to-Head Fighting Game
Cyberbots: Fullmetal Madness	April 20, 1995	Capcom	Cyberbots: Full Metal Madness (サイバーボッツ -FULL METAL MADNESS-)	Head-to-Head Fighting Game
Street Fighter Alpha	June 5, 1995	Capcom	Street Fighter Zero (ストリートファイターZERO)	Head-to-Head Fighting Game
Mega Man: The Power Battle	September 22, 1995	Capcom	Rockman: The Power Battle (ロックマン ザ・パワーバトル)	Fighting game
Marvel Super Heroes	October 24, 1995	Capcom	Marvel Super Heroes	Head-to-Head Fighting Game
19XX: The War Against Destiny	December 7, 1995	Capcom	19XX The War Against Destiny	Shoot 'em up
Dungeons & Dragons: Shadow over Mystara	February 6, 1996	Capcom	Dungeons & Dragons: Shadow over Mystara (ダンジョンズ&ドラゴンズ シャドーオーバーミスタラ)	Beat 'em up
Street Fighter Alpha 2	February 27, 1996	Capcom	Street Fighter Zero 2 (ストリートファイターZERO2)	Head-to-Head Fighting Game
Super Puzzle Fighter II Turbo	May 29, 1996	Capcom	Super Puzzle Fighter II X (スーパーパズルファイターIIX)	Puzzle game
Mega Man 2: The Power Fighters	July 8, 1996	Capcom	Rockman 2: The Power Fighters (ロックマン2 ザ・パワーファイターズ)	Fighting game
Street Fighter Alpha 2 Gold	August 5, 1996	Capcom	Street Fighter Zero 2 Alpha (ストリートファイターZERO2 ALPHA)	Head-to-Head Fighting Game
Quiz Nanairo Dreams: Nijiirochō no Kiseki	August 26, 1996	Capcom	Quiz Nanairo Dreams: Nijiirochō no Kiseki (クイズなないろDREAMS 虹色町の奇跡)	Quiz game
X-Men vs. Street Fighter	September 9, 1996	Capcom	X-Men vs. Street Fighter	Head-to-Head Fighting Game
Battle Circuit	March 19, 1997	Capcom	Battle Circuit (バトルサーキット)	Beat 'em up
Vampire Savior	May 19, 1997	Capcom	Vampire Savior: The Lord of Vampire (ヴァンパイアセイヴァー -The Lord of Vampire-)	Head-to-Head Fighting Game
Marvel Super Heroes vs. Street Fighter	June 20, 1997	Capcom	Marvel Super Heroes vs. Street Fighter	Head-to-Head Fighting Game
Capcom Sports Club	July 22, 1997	Capcom	Capcom Sports Club (カプコンスポーツクラブ)	Sports game
Super Gem Fighter Mini Mix	September 4, 1997	Capcom	Pocket Fighter (ポケットファイター)	Head-to-Head Fighting Game
Vampire Hunter 2: Darkstalkers' Revenge	September 13, 1997	Capcom	Vampire Hunter 2: Darkstalkers' Revenge (ヴァンパイアハンター2 -Darkstalkers' Revenge-)	Head-to-Head Fighting Game
Vampire Savior 2: The Lord of Vampire	September 13, 1997	Capcom	Vampire Savior 2: The Lord of Vampire (ヴァンパイアセイヴァー2 -The Lord of Vampire-)	Head-to-Head Fighting Game
Marvel vs. Capcom: Clash of Super Heroes	January 12, 1998	Capcom	Marvel vs. Capcom: Clash of Super Heroes	Head-to-Head Fighting Game
Street Fighter Alpha 3	June 29, 1998	Capcom	Street Fighter Zero 3 (ストリートファイターZERO3)	Head-to-Head Fighting Game
Giga Wing	February 22, 1999	Takumi	Giga Wing (ギガウイング)	Shoot 'em up
Jyangokushi: Haō no Saihai	May 27, 1999	Capcom	Jyangokushi: Haō no Saihai (雀國志 覇王の采牌)	Puzzle game
Dimahoo	January 21, 2000	Eighting/Raizing	Great Mahō Daisakusen (グレート魔法大作戦)	Shoot 'em up
Mars Matrix: Hyper Solid Shooting	April 12, 2000	Takumi	Mars Matrix (マーズマトリックス)	Shoot 'em up
1944: The Loop Master	June 20, 2000	Eighting/Raizing	1944 The Loop Master	Shoot 'em up
Mighty! Pang	October 10, 2000	Mitchell	Mighty Pang (マイティ・パン)	Platformer
Progear	January 17, 2001	Cave	Progear no Arashi (プロギアの嵐)	Shoot 'em up
Puzz Loop 2	February 5, 2001	Mitchell	Puzz Loop 2 (パズループ2)	Puzzle game
Janpai Puzzle Chōkō	August 20, 2001	Mitchell	Janpai Puzzle Chōkō (雀牌パズル 長江)	Puzzle game
Hyper Street Fighter II: The Anniversary Edition	December 22, 2003	Capcom	Hyper Street Fighter II (ハイパーストリートファイターII)	Head-to-Head Fighting Game

== See also ==
- CP System
- CP System III
