= Giga Wing =

1999 video game

- Arcade flyer
- Developer: Takumi Corporation
- Publisher: Capcom; Dreamcast: EU: Virgin Interactive
- Designer: Kei Toume
- Composer: Yasushi Kaminishi
- Platforms: Arcade, Dreamcast
- Release: Arcade: NA: February 1999; JP: March 1999; Dreamcast: JP: November 11, 1999; NA: July 18, 2000; EU: October 20, 2000
- Genre: Scrolling shooter
- Modes: Single-player, multiplayer
- Arcade system: CP System II

Giga Wing (Note: Japanese: ギガウイング, Hepburn: Giga Uingu) is a 1999 vertically scrolling shooter video game developed by Takumi Corporation and published by Capcom for arcades and the Dreamcast. The arcade version is notable for using a horizontally aligned monitor (much like Treasure's Radiant Silvergun), something that is considered rare for a vertical shooter. The Dreamcast version had been scheduled to be released in the U.S. in April 2000, before it was delayed to July 18, 2000. It was later included in Capcom Arcade Stadium.

== Gameplay and plot ==
Arcade version screenshot.

Giga Wing takes place during a fictional war within a steampunk setting. The player controls one of four different futuristic aircraft and must destroy enemy aircraft, tanks, ships, and buildings using both guns and missiles mounted on the aircraft and a limited supply of bombs which damage or destroy all enemies on-screen when used. The game is based on the player(s) trying to destroy a medallion which possesses great power. Many of the bosses use the medallion as a weapon. At the end, it shows that an evil man who pilots a ship called the "Stranger" is the real person who is in control of the Medallion, and was responsible for the war, as well as other conflicts in the past including World War II, and the players fight him three times as a mini-boss and as the last boss. He appears to be a friend of Stuck 30 years ago when the players fight him with Stuck.

There are four different characters in the game: Sinnosuke, Ruby, Isha, and Stuck and each of them has their own individual storyline. Players can also do team play mode that has two characters at once, creating a new storyline. In each storyline, there are two endings. In the bad ending, the character the player uses will sacrifice their life in a kamikaze attack that destroys the Medallion. In team up mode, generally one of the character does this, but sometimes both characters survive. In the good endings for either solo or team play, the characters do not sacrifice themselves.

The player chooses one of four different craft and shoots through seven stages. Each level ends with a boss fight and each game begins with three lives. The option to continue is given when all lives are lost, although the seventh stage is only accessible if the player does not use any continues. Each ship in Giga Wing has three attacks: a normal shot (spray of bullets), reflect (reflects enemy bullets and damages enemy ships in the field), and force bomb (nullifies all on-screen bullets). Defeated ships sometimes drop power-ups. Each ship starts out with two bombs and up to seven can be collected. Each bomb left in reserve after any boss fight gives the player a bonus. Players can increase their score multiplier by collecting medals dropped by defeated ships. Player "rank" is determined by score at the end of each level. The game adjusts the difficulty accordingly.

== Reception ==
Reception

Aggregate score
Aggregator	Score
GameRankings	51%

Review scores
Publication	Score
CNET Gamecenter	6/10
Consoles +	85%
Electronic Gaming Monthly	6.125/10 (Note: Four critics of Electronic Gaming Monthly gave the game each a score of 6.5/10, 6/10, 7.5/10, and 4.5/10 in an early review.)
Famitsu	28/40
Game Informer	7.5/10
GameFan	(JP) 68% (US) 42%
GameSpot	4.4/10
IGN	6/10
Next Generation	2/5

The Dreamcast version received "mixed" reviews according to the review aggregation website GameRankings. Game Informer gave the game a favorable review, and Electronic Gaming Monthly gave it a mixed review, both while the game was still in development. Jim Preston of NextGen said that the game "should be packaged with bottles of both Visine and Excedrin." In Japan, Famitsu gave it a score of 28 out of 40.

Also in Japan, Game Machine listed the arcade version in their May 1, 1999 issue as the tenth most-successful arcade game of the month.
