= Takumi Corporation =

Japanese video game company

Takumi Corporation 株式会社タクミコーポレーション
- Company type: Corporation
- Industry: Video games
- Founded: May 1994
- Defunct: circa 2010-2015
- Headquarters: Shinjuku, Tokyo, Japan
- Key people: Tomoaki Fujimoto
- Products: Twin Cobra II; Giga Wing series Mars Matrix
- Number of employees: 23
- Divisions: Software, hardware, sales, business operation
- Website: takumi-net.co.jp (archived)

Takumi Corporation (タクミコーポレーション, Takumi Kōporēshon) was a Japanese video game company founded in May 1994 that is famous for developing arcade shoot 'em ups.

Following Toaplan's bankruptcy, some of the former staff went to Takumi. Among Toaplan's offshoots, only Takumi has developed any sequels to former Toaplan games.

Takumi is one of the splinter companies formed when the company Toaplan disbanded in 1994, the other being Cave.

The company had also produced soundtrack albums.

== Developed products ==
=== Video games ===
- Twin Cobra II (Kyukyoku Tiger II) (1995)
- Tsunahiki Wars (1995)
- Mahō Juku: Magic Master (cancelled; co-developed with Saurus)
- Giga Wing (1999)
- Giga Wing 2 (2000)
- Mars Matrix: Hyper Solid Shooting (2000)
- Night Raid (2001)
- Weather Tales (Otenki Kororin) (2001)
- Don Chan Puzzle: Hanabi de Don! (2003; co-developed with Aruze)
- Kurukuru Fever (2003; co-developed with Aruze)
- Giga Wing Generations (2004)
- Elemental Monster
- Milon no Hoshizora Shabon: Puzzle Kumikyoku (2006)
- Fishing Master (2007)
- Fishing Master World Tour (2008)
- Mezase!! Tsuri Master DS (2009)

=== Medal games ===
- Crusher Mako-chan (1999)
- Horutoru Bomber (1999)
- Koro Koro Quest (1999)
- Shuffle Gakuen (Unknown)

=== Prize games ===
- 4x4 Rally
- Bingo de Bingo!
- Go! Go! Pen-Suke
- Rolling Soccer

=== Soundtracks ===
- "Kyuukyouku Tiger II" Official soundtrack
- "Giga Wing" Official soundtrack
- "Mars Matrix/Giga Wing 2" Official soundtrack
- "Night Raid" Official soundtrack
- "Blast! Shooting Game Sound Omnibus Vol.1"
