= List of Namco arcade system boards =

Namco is a multinational video game and entertainment company that, as part of its business, produced arcade system boards.

== Arcade system boards ==
Arcade board	Release date	Notes	Notable games and release years
System 1	1987	16-bit arcade system; Yokai Dochuki was Namco's first 16-bit arcade game	Yokai Dochuki (1987); Dragon Spirit (1987); Blazer (1987); Quester (1987); Pac-Mania (1987); Galaga '88 (1987); World Stadium (1988); Bravoman (1988); Märchen Maze (1988); Baraduke II (1988); World Court (1988); Splatterhouse (1988); Face Off (1988); Rompers (1989); Blast Off (1989); Dangerous Seed (1989); World Stadium '89 (1989); Pistol Daimyo no Bōken (1990); Sokoban Deluxe (1990); Puzzle Club (1990; unreleased prototype); World Stadium '90 (1990); Tank Force (1991)
System 2	1987	Introduced with Final Lap; Uses the Namco C140 sound chip	Final Lap (1987); Assault (1988); Ordyne (1988); Metal Hawk (1988); Mirai Ninja (1988); Phelios (1988); Valkyrie no Densetsu (1989); Dirt Fox (1989); Finest Hour (1989); Burning Force (1989); Four Trax (1989); Marvel Land (1989); Kyuukai Douchuuki (1990); Final Lap 2 (1990); Steel Gunner (1990); Dragon Saber (1990); Rolling Thunder 2 (1990); Super World Stadium (1991); Golly! Ghost! (1991); Steel Gunner 2 (1992); Cosmo Gang the Video (1992); Bubble Trouble: Golly! Ghost! 2 (1992); Final Lap 3 (1992); Suzuka 8 Hours (1992); Lucky & Wild (1992); Super World Stadium '92 (1992); Suzuka 8 Hours 2 (1993); Super World Stadium '93 (1993)
System 21 "Polygonizer"	1988	Preceded by System 2 and succeeded by System 22; Unveiled in 1988 with Winning Run; First arcade system board specifically designed for 3D polygon processing; Consists of four PCBs housed in a metal crate; Uses two Motorola 68000 main processors at 12.288 MHz; Uses four Texas Instruments TMS320C25 digital signal processors at 24.576 MHz for 3D calculations; Starblade instead uses five TMS320C20 DSPs; Uses a Motorola 6809 sound processor at 3.072 MHz; Uses a Yamaha YM2151 sound chip at 3.58 MHz; Uses a Hitachi HD63705 microcontroller at 2.048 MHz and Namco custom chips; Was in development for more than three years before release, beginning around the mid-1980s; Phil Harrison reported in 1989 that Atari Games' Hard Drivin' ran on an earlier, less powerful version of the hardware, and described System 21 as a shared Namco–Atari development	Winning Run (1988); Winning Run Suzuka Grand Prix (1989); Galaxian³ (1990); Driver's Eyes (1991); Winning Run '91 (1991); Starblade (1991); Solvalou (1991; 3D sequel to Xevious); Air Combat (1993); Cyber Sled (1993); Attack of the Zolgear (1994)
NA-1	1992	Uses the Namco C219 sound chip	Bakuretsu Quiz Ma-Q Dai Bōken (1992); F/A (1992); Cosmo Gang the Puzzle (1992); Exvania (1992); Super World Court (1992); Emeraldia (1993); Tinkle Pit (1993); X-Day (1993)
NA-2	1992	Related to the NA-1 platform; Uses the Namco C219 sound chip	Knuckle Heads (1992); Emeraldia (1993); Nettou! Gekitou! Quiztou!! (1993); Numan Athletics (1993)
System 22	1992	Successor to System 21; Designed by Namco; Debuted in Japan in 1992 with Sim Drive, followed by its worldwide debut in 1993 with Ridge Racer; Uses a Motorola 68020 32-bit main processor at 24.576 MHz; Uses two TMS32025 DSPs at 49.152 MHz, although the exact number of DSPs may vary; Uses Namco's in-house-developed TR3 graphics processor; Supports texture mapping, Gouraud shading, transparency effects and depth cueing; Capable of displaying 16.7 million colours and processing 240,000 polygons per second; Uses a Mitsubishi M37702 sound CPU at 16.384 MHz; Uses the Namco C352 sound chip, with 32 voices, four 16-bit channels and support for 8-bit linear or μ-law PCM samples	Sim Drive (1992; limited release in Japan); Ridge Racer (1993); Ace Driver (1994); Alpine Racer (1994); Cyber Commando (1994); Ridge Racer 2 (1994)
NB-1	1993	Uses the Namco C352 sound chip	Great Sluggers (1993); NebulasRay (1994); Great Sluggers '94 (1994); J-League Soccer V-Shoot (1994); Point Blank (1994); Super World Stadium '95 (1995); Super World Stadium '96 (1996); Super World Stadium '97 (1997)
System FL	1993	Uses the Namco C352 sound chip	Final Lap R (1993); Speed Racer (1995)
System 11	September 1994	32-bit arcade system board developed jointly by Namco and Sony Computer Entertainment; Based on a prototype of the PlayStation; Tekken was initially planned for System 22, but development was moved to System 11; Uses a MIPS R3000A 32-bit RISC main processor at 33.8688 MHz; Uses a Namco C76 (Mitsubishi M37702) sound CPU and Namco C352 sound chip; 2 MB main RAM, 2 MB video VRAM and 512 kB sound RAM; Graphics processor rated at 360,000 polygons per second; Discontinued in February 1999	Tekken (1994); Tekken 2 (1995); Tekken 2 Ver.β (1995); Soul Edge (1995); Dunk Mania (1996); Xevious 3D/G (1996); Dancing Eyes (1996); Soul Edge Ver. II (1996); J-League Soccer: Prime Goal EX (1996); Starsweep (1997); Pocket Racer (1997); Point Blank 2 (1998); Family Bowl (1998); Kosodate Quiz My Angel 3: My Little Pet (1998)
NB-2	1995	Related to the NB-1 platform; Uses the Namco C352 sound chip	Mach Breakers: Numan Athletics 2 (1995); The Outfoxies (1995)
Super System 22	1995	Variant of System 22; Hardware largely similar to System 22; Provides a slightly higher polygon rate and additional special effects; Uses a Mitsubishi M37710 sound CPU at 16.384 MHz	Air Combat 22 (1995); Ace Driver: Victory Lap (1995); Dirt Dash (1995); Rave Racer (1995); Time Crisis (1995); Cyber Cycles (1995); Alpine Racer 2 (1996); Alpine Surfer (1996); Aqua Jet (1996); Prop Cycle (1996); Tokyo Wars (1996); Armadillo Racing (1997)
ND-1	1995	Uses the Namco C352 sound chip	Namco Classic Collection Vol. 1 (1995); Namco Classic Collection Vol. 2 (1996); Abnormal Check (1996)
System 12	1996	Upgraded version of System 11 with faster processing power; Uses the same basic configuration as System 11, but with the CPU operating frequency increased by a factor of 1.5; First publicly used for Tekken 3, released in March 1997; Uses a MIPS R3000A 32-bit RISC main processor at 48 MHz; Uses a Hitachi H8/3002 sound CPU and Namco C352 sound chip	Tekken 3 (1997); LiberoGrande (1997); Soulcalibur (1998); Techno Drive (1998); Super World Stadium '98 (1998); Fighting Layer (1998); Derby Quiz: My Dream Horse (1998); Tenkomori Shooting (1998); Tekken Tag Tournament (1999); Mr. Driller (1999); Aqua Rush (1999); Golgo 13 (1999); Super World Stadium '99 (1999); Ghoul Panic (1999); Um Jammer Lammy NOW! (1999); Kaiun Quiz (1999); Golgo 13 Kiseki no Dandou (2000); Point Blank 3 (2000); Super World Stadium 2000 (2000); Truck Kyosokyoku (2000); Golgo 13 Juusei no Requiem (2001); Super World Stadium 2001 (2001)
System 22.5 / Gorgon	1997	Uses a Hitachi H8/3334 I/O processor	Final Furlong (1997); Rapid River (1997)
System 23	1997	Announced in 1996; Uses a 133 MHz IDT R4650 64-bit main processor; Uses a Hitachi H8/3334 I/O processor; Uses the Namco C352 sound chip; Uses Namco-proprietary graphics hardware with multiple parallel VideoLogic PowerVR chips; Capable of two million polygons per second, texture mapping and Gouraud shading	Time Crisis II (1997); Motocross Go! (1997); Downhill Bikers (1997); Angler King (1998)
Super System 23	1997	More powerful variant of System 23; Uses a 166 MHz main processor; Uses a PIC16Cxx I/O processor	Time Crisis II (1997); 500GP (1998); Guitar Jam (1999)
Super System 23 GMEN	1998	Uses an additional Hitachi SH-2 I/O processor	Gunmen Wars (1998); Race On! (1998); Final Furlong 2 (1998)
Super System 23 Evolution 2	1999	Uses a 200 MHz main processor; Uses a PIC16Cxx I/O processor	Crisis Zone (1999)
System 10	2000	Based on PlayStation hardware; Uses a MIPS R3000A 32-bit RISC processor; 132 MB/s bus and 512 KB OS ROM; 2 MB main RAM, 2 MB video RAM and 512 KB sound RAM; Uses the PlayStation SPU with 24 channels and 44.1 kHz PCM audio; Graphics processor rated at 360,000 polygons per second; Supports resolutions from 256×224 to 740×480 and 16.7 million colours; Uses ROM and, for some games, CD/DVD media	GAHAHA Ippatsudou (2000); Mr. Driller 2 (2000); Point Blank 3 / Gunbalina (2000); GAHAHA Ippatsudou 2 (2001); Gekitoride-Jong Space (2001); Honne Hakkenki (2001); Kotoba no Puzzle: Mojipittan (2001); Mr. Driller G (2001); Taiko no Tatsujin (2001); Taiko no Tatsujin 2 (2001); Gamshara (2002); Hard Puncher Hajime no Ippo 2 Ouja e no Chousen (2002); Panikuru Panekuru (2002); Puzz Ball (2002); Slot no Oji Sama (2002); Star Trigon (2002); Sugorochikku Japan (2002); Taiko no Tatsujin 3 (2002); Taiko no Tatsujin 4 (2002); Tsukkomi Yousei Gips Nice Tsukkomi (2002); Uchuu Daisakusen - Chocovader Contactee (2002); Kono e-Tako (2003); NFL Classic Football (2003); Petter the Shepherd (2003); Seishun Quiz Colorful High School (2003); Taiko no Tatsujin 5 (2003); Dokidoki! Flower (2004); Sekai Kaseki Hakken (2004); Taiko no Tatsujin 6 (2004); Ball Pom Line (2005); Medal No Tatsujin (2005); Puzz Cube (2005); Medal No Tatsujin 2 (2006)
System 246	December 2000	Based on PlayStation 2 technology; Uses the MIPS III R5900-based "Emotion Engine" processor at 294.912 MHz; Uses a MIPS II R3000A I/O processor at 33.8688 MHz; 32 MB RDRAM; Uses the PlayStation 2 Graphics Synthesizer at 147.456 MHz with 4 MB eDRAM; Uses SPU1 and SPU2 sound hardware; Supports CD-ROM, DVD-ROM and hard-drive storage, with a 64-Mbit NAND FlashROM security dongle	Bloody Roar 3 (2000); Vampire Night (2000); Wangan Midnight (2001); Tekken 4 (2001); Wangan Midnight R (2001); Soulcalibur II (2002); Time Crisis 3 (2002); Dragon Chronicles (2002); Samurai Surf X (2002); Professional Baseball 2002 (2002); Smash Court Tennis (2002); Dragon Chronicles II (2003); Tekken 5 (2004); Tekken 5.1 (2004); Tekken 5: Dark Resurrection (2005); Taiko no Tatsujin 7 (2005)
System 256	2004	Upgraded version of System 246; Uses 8 MB graphics eDRAM; Main processor can operate at 299 MHz	The Idolmaster (2005)
Super System 256	2006	Variant of System 256 with an integrated gun board; Used for Time Crisis 4	Time Crisis 4 (2006)
System N2		Developed by Namco and Nvidia; Based on an nForce2 motherboard developed by Nvidia; Uses Nvidia GeForce graphics and OpenGL; Runs 32-bit Linux based on Debian	Counter-Strike Neo (2005); Mobile Suit Gundam: Bonds of the Battlefield (2007); New Space Order (2007); Wangan Midnight: Maximum Tune 3 (2007); Animal Kaiser: The King of Animal (2008); Mobile Suit Gundam: Bonds of the Battlefield Rev.2.00 (2008); Wangan Midnight: Maximum Tune 3DX (2008); Wangan Midnight: Maximum Tune 3DX Plus (2010)
System ES1		PC-based successor platform; Runs a Debian-based Linux operating system	Nirin (2009); Tank! Tank! Tank! (2009); Dead Heat Street Racing / Maximum Heat (2011); Wangan Midnight Maximum Tune 4 (2011); Dead Heat Riders (2013); Sailor Zombie AKB48 Arcade Edition (2014); Wangan Midnight Maximum Tune 5 (North American version) (2017)
System ES1(A2)		PC-based platform; Runs Windows Embedded 7	Mobile Suit Gundam: Bonds of the Battlefield Rev.3.00 (2011); Wangan Midnight Maximum Tune 4 (Asia/Indonesia version) (2012); Wangan Midnight Maximum Tune 5 (Asia/Indonesia version) (2015); Wangan Midnight Maximum Tune 5 DX (Asia/Indonesia version) (2016); Wangan Midnight Maximum Tune 5 DX Plus (Asia/Indonesia version) (2017)
System ES2 Plus		PC-based platform; Runs Windows Embedded 7	Aikatsu! (2012); Hyakujuu Taisen Great Animal Kaiser (2012)
System ES3		PC-based platform; Runs Windows Embedded Standard 7	Mario Kart Arcade GP DX (2013); Mach Storm (2013); Lost Land Adventure (2014); Wangan Midnight Maximum Tune 5 (2014); Pokkén Tournament (2015); Star Wars Battle Pod (2015); Synchronica (2015); Tekken 7 (2015); Time Crisis 5 (2015); Wangan Midnight Maximum Tune 5 DX (2015); Mobile Suit Gundam: Bonds of the Battlefield Rev.4.00 (2016); Tekken 7: Fated Retribution (2016); Wangan Midnight Maximum Tune 5 DX Plus (2016); Wangan Midnight Maximum Tune 6 (2018); Tekken 7: Fated Retribution Round 2 (2019); Wangan Midnight Maximum Tune 6R (2020); Wangan Midnight Maximum Tune 6RR (2021); Wangan Midnight Maximum Tune 6RR Plus (2024)
System ES4		Runs Windows Embedded 7	Point Blank X (2015)
System BNA1		Runs Windows 10 IoT Enterprise 2016 LTSB	Mobile Suit Gundam Extreme Vs. 2 (2018); JoJo's Bizarre Adventure: Last Survivor (2019); Sword Art Online Arcade (2019); Wangan Midnight Maximum Tune 6 (export version) (2019); Mobile Suit Gundam: Bonds of the Battlefield II (2020); Poker Stadium (2020)
System BNA1 LITE		Less powerful version of System BNA1 intended for less demanding games	Mario Kart Arcade GP DX (2013); Taiko no Tatsujin Nijiiro ver. (2020); Dead Heat Unleashed (2023)

== Gallery ==
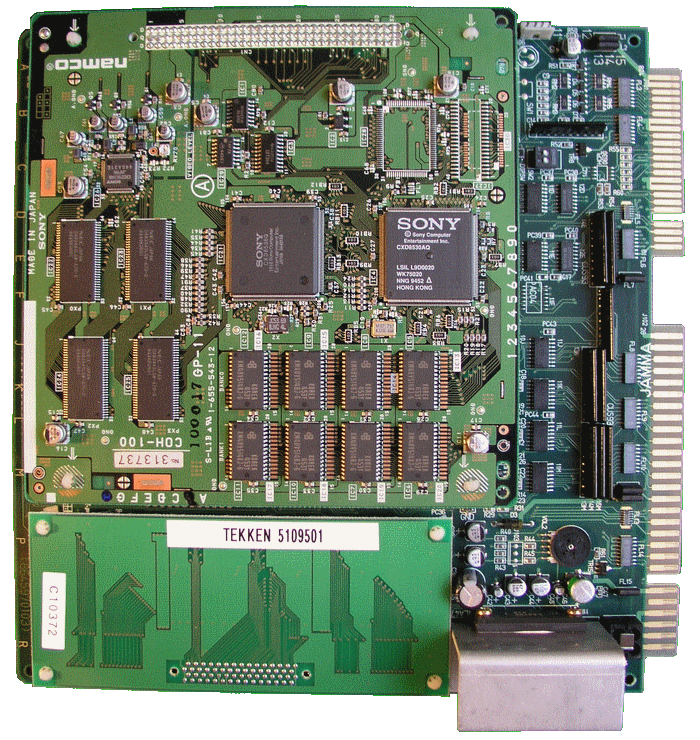
Namco System 11 circuit board

Logo of the System 21 "Polygonizer"

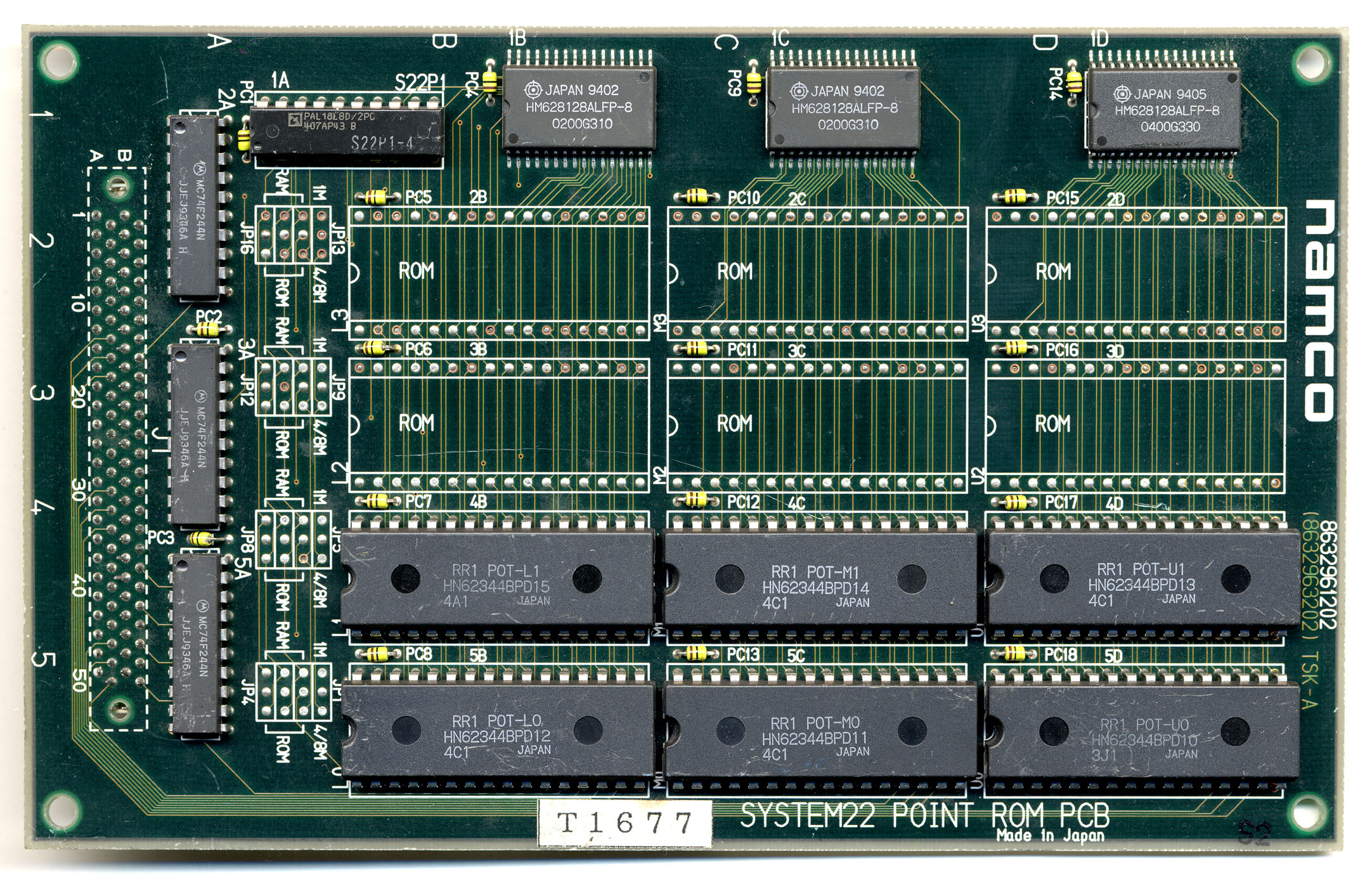
Namco System 22 circuit board

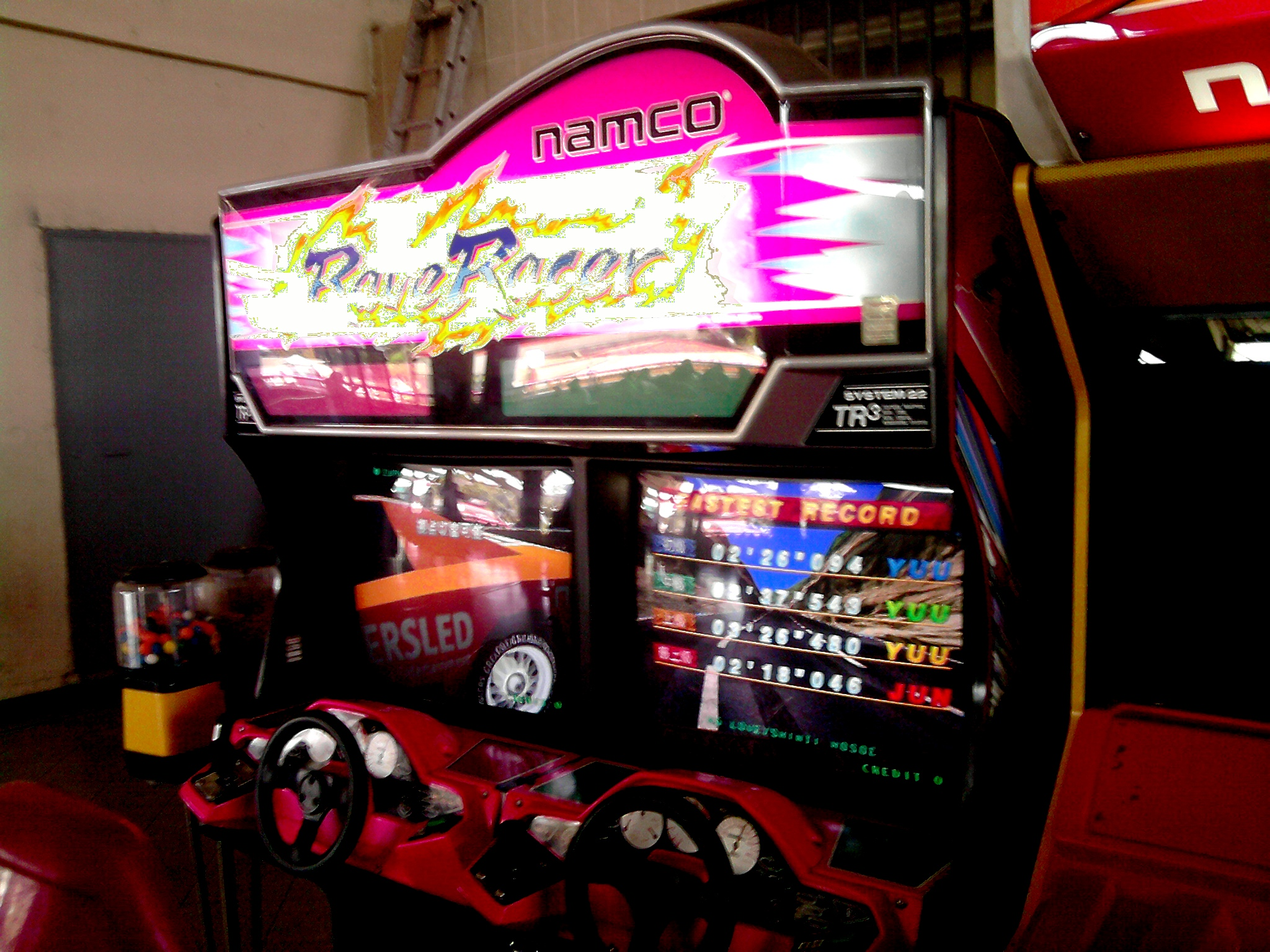
System 22 hardware running Rave Racer

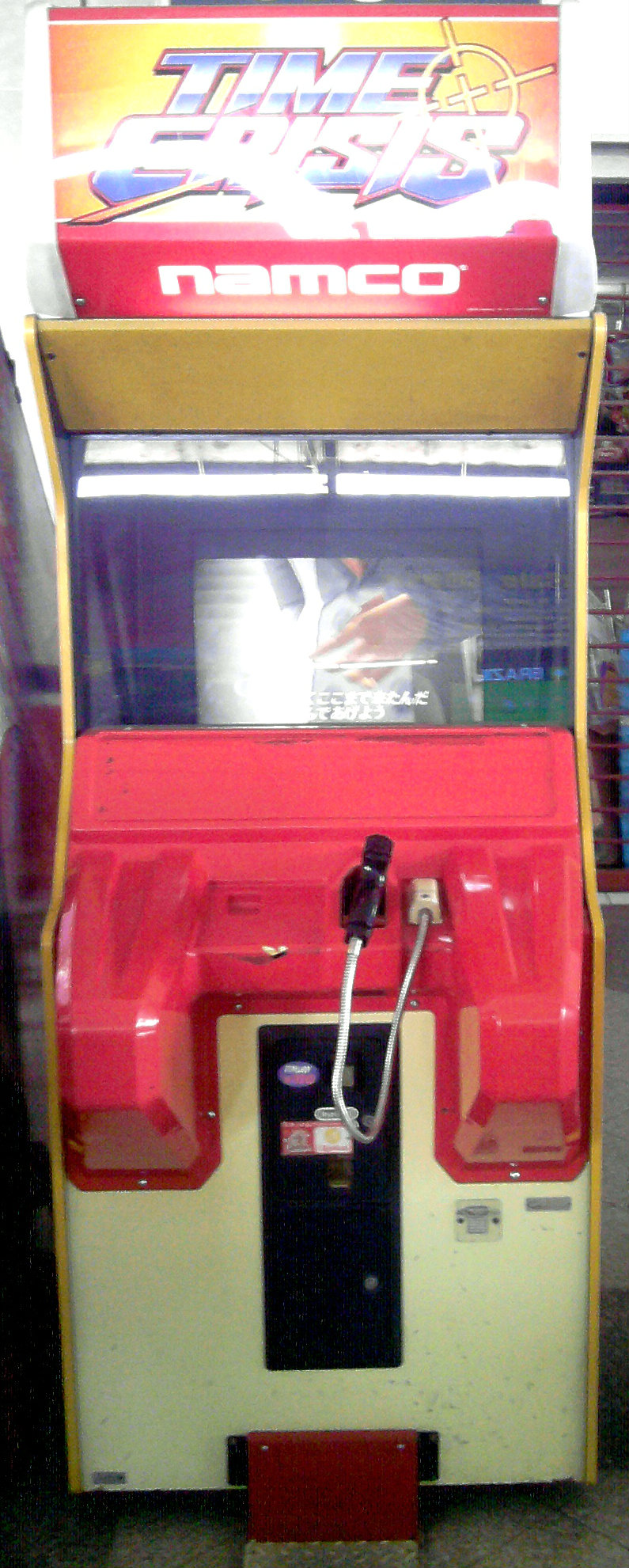
System 22 hardware running Time Crisis

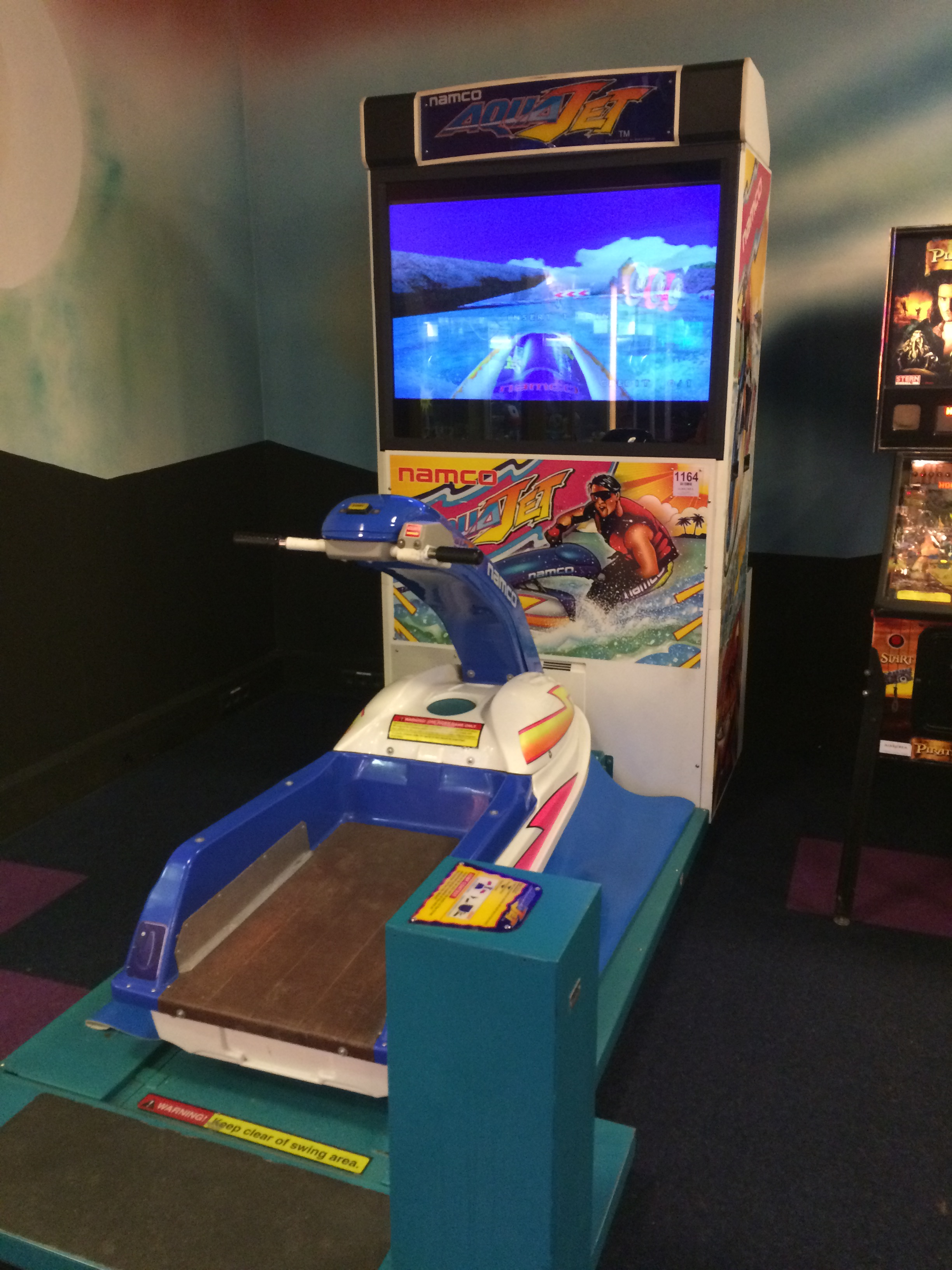
System 22 hardware running Aqua Jet
