= List of arcade video games: D =

This is a list of arcade video games organized alphabetically by name. It does not include PC or console games unless they were also released in video arcades. See Lists of video games for related lists.

| Title | Alternate Title | Year | Manufacturer | Genre(s) | Max. Players | PCB Model |
|---|---|---|---|---|---|---|
| D-Con | — | 1992 | Success | | | |
| D-Day | — | 1982 | Olympia | | | |
| D-Day | — | 1984 | Jaleco | | | |
| D. D. Crew | — | 1991 | Sega | Beat 'em up | 4 | |
| D1GP Arcade | D1 Grand Prix Arcade | 2008 | Taito | Racing | 1-2 | |
| Dacholer | Kick Boy | 1983 | Nichibutsu | | 2 | |
| Dai San Wakusei Meteor | — | 1979 | Sun Electronics | | | |
| Dai-Dai-Kakumei | — | 2004 | SystemBit | | | |
| Daifugou | — | 1983 | Esco Trading | | | |
| Daikaiju no Gyakushu | — | 1986 | Taito | | | |
| Daioh | — | 1993 | Athena | Scrolling shooter | 2 | |
| Daisu-Kiss | — | 1996 | Konami | | | |
| Daitoride | — | 1996 | Metro | | | |
| DakkoChan Jansoh | — | 1987 | Sega | | | |
| Dambusters | — | 1981 | SWR | Scrolling Shooter | | |
| Dance 86.4 Funky Radio Station | | 2005 | Konami | Music | 2 | Konami Python 2 |
| Dance Dance Revolution | Dancing Stage | 1998 | Konami | Music, Exercise | 4 | |
| Dance Dance Revolution 1.5 | — | 1999 | Konami | Music, Exercise | 4 | |
| Dance Dance Revolution 2ndMix | — | 1999 | Konami | Music, Exercise | 4 | |
| Dance Dance Revolution 2ndMix Link Version | — | 1999 | Konami | Music, Exercise | 4 | |
| Dance Dance Revolution 2ndMix with beatmania IIDX club version | — | 1999 | Konami | Music, Exercise | 4 | |
| Dance Dance Revolution 2ndMix with beatmania IIDX substream club | — | 1999 | Konami | Music, Exercise | 4 | |
| Dance Dance Revolution 3rdMix | — | 1999 | Konami | Music, Exercise | 4 | |
| Dance Dance Revolution 3rdMix Plus | — | 2000 | Konami | Music, Exercise | 4 | |
| Dance Dance Revolution 4thMix | Dance Dance Revolution USA | 2000 | Konami | Music, Exercise | 4 | |
| Dance Dance Revolution 4thMix Plus | — | 2000 | Konami | Music, Exercise | 4 | |
| Dance Dance Revolution 5thMix | — | 2001 | Konami | Music, Exercise | 4 | |
| Dance Dance Revolution Best of Cool Dancers | — | 1999 | Konami | Music, Exercise | 4 | |
| Dance Dance Revolution Extreme | — | 2002 | Konami | Music, Exercise | 4 | |
| Dance Dance Revolution Karaoke Mix | — | 1999 | Konami | Music, Exercise | 4 | |
| Dance Dance Revolution Karaoke Mix 2nd | Dancing Stage | 2000 | Konami | Music, Exercise | 4 | |
| Dance Dance Revolution Kids | — | 2000 | Konami | Music, Exercise | 4 | |
| Dance Dance Revolution Solo 2000 | — | 1999 | Konami | Music, Exercise | 4 | |
| Dance Dance Revolution Solo 4thMIX | — | 2000 | Konami | Music, Exercise | 4 | |
| Dance Dance Revolution Solo 4thMIX PLUS | — | 2000 | Konami | Music, Exercise | 4 | |
| Dance Dance Revolution Solo BASS MIX | — | 1999 | Konami | Music, Exercise | 4 | |
| Dance Dance Revolution: Disney Mix | Dancing Stage Featuring Disney's Rave | 2000 | Konami | Music, Exercise | 4 | |
| Dance Dance Revolution SuperNOVA | — | 2006 | Konami | Music, Exercise | 4 | |
| Dance Dance Revolution SuperNOVA 2 | — | 2007 | Konami | Music, Exercise | 4 | |
| Dance Maniax | Dance Freaks | 2000 | Konami | | | |
| Dance Maniax 2nd Mix | — | 2001 | Konami | | | |
| Dance Maniax 2nd Mix Append J-paradise | — | 2001 | Konami | | | |
| Danchi de Hanafuda - Okusan Komeya Desuyo! | — | 1999 | Altron | | | Sega ST-V |
| Danchi de Quiz Okusan Yontaku Desuyo! | — | 2000 | Altron | | | Sega ST-V |
| Dancing Eyes | — | 1996 | Namco | | | |
| Dancing Stage EuroMIX | — | 1999 | Konami | Music, Exercise | 4 | |
| Dancing Stage EuroMIX 2 | — | 2002 | Konami | Music, Exercise | 4 | |
| Dancing Stage Featuring Dreams Come True | — | 1999 | Konami | Music, Exercise | 4 | |
| Dancing Stage featuring True Kiss Destination | — | 1999 | Konami | Music, Exercise | 4 | |
| Dangar – Ufo Robo | — | 1986 | Nichibutsu | Scrolling shooter | 2 | |
| Danger Zone | — | 1986 | Cinematronics | Shooter | 2 | |
| Dangerous Curves | — | 1995 | Taito | Racing | 2 | |
| Dangerous Dungeons | — | 1992 | The Game Room | Platform | 1 | |
| Dangerous Seed | — | 1989 | Namco | Scrolling shooter | 2 | Namco System 1 |
| Dangun Feveron | Fever SOS | 1998 | CAVE | Scrolling shooter | 2 | |
| Danny Sullivan's Indy Heat | — | 1991 | Leland | Racing | 3 | |
| Darius | — | 1986 | Taito | Scrolling shooter | 2 | |
| Darius: Extra Version | — | 1987 | Taito | Scrolling shooter | 2 | |
| Darius II | — | 1989 | Taito | Scrolling shooter | 2 | |
| Darius Gaiden | — | 1994 | Taito | Scrolling shooter | 2 | |
| Darius Gaiden: Silver Hawk - Extra Version | — | 1995 | Taito | Scrolling shooter | 2 | |
| Dark Adventure | Devil World^{JP,EU} | 1987 | Konami | Adventure | 3 | |
| Dark Edge | — | 1993 | Sega | Fighting | 2 | Sega System 32 |
| Dark Horse Legend | — | 1998 | Konami | | | |
| Dark Planet | — | 1982 | Stern Electronics | Shooter | 2 | |
| Dark Silhouette: Silent Scope 2 | Fatal Judgement: Silent Scope 2^{EU} Innocent Sweeper: Silent Scope 2^{JP} | 2000 | Taito | Scrolling shooter | 2 | |
| Dark Tower | — | 1992 | The Game Room | | | |
| Dark Warrior | — | 1981 | Century Electronics | | | |
| Darkstalkers: The Night Warriors | Vampire: The Night Warriors ^{JP} | 1995 | Capcom | Fighting | 2 | CPS2 |
| Darwin 4078 | — | 1986 | Data East | Scrolling shooter | 2 | |
| Data East's Street Slam | Dunk Dream^{JP} | 1994 | Data East | | | NeoGeo |
| Data East's Hoops | Dunk Dream '95^{JP}, Hoops '96 ^{EU} | 1995 | Data East | | | NeoGeo |
| Data East Stadium Hero '96 | — | 1996 | Data East | | | |
| Date Quiz Go Go | — | 1998 | SemiCom | | | |
| Date Quiz Go Go Episode 2 | — | 2000 | SemiCom | | | |
| Datsun 280 ZZZAP | — | 1976 | Midway | Driving | 1 | |
| Daytona USA | Sega Racing Classic; 2010 re-release | 1994 | Sega | Racing game | 1-8 | Sega Model 2 |
| Daytona USA 2 Power Edition | — | 1998 | Sega | Racing game | 1-8 | Sega Model 3 |
| Daytona USA 2: Battle On The Edge | — | 1998 | Sega | Racing game | 1-8 | Sega Model 3 |
| Dazzler | — | 1982 | Century Electronics | | 2 | |
| DB: Downhill Bikers | — | 1997 | Namco | | 2 | |
| DDRMAX Dance Dance Revolution 6thMix | — | 2001 | Konami | | 4 | |
| DDRMAX2 Dance Dance Revolution 7thMix | — | 2002 | Konami | | 4 | |
| Dead Angle | Lead Angle^{JP} | 1988 | Seibu Kaihatsu | | 2 | |
| Dead Connection | — | 1992 | Taito | | 2 | |
| Dead Eye (Meadows Games) | — | 1978 | Meadows Games | | | |
| Dead Eye (Konami) | — | 1996 | Konami | | | |
| Dead or Alive | — | 1996 | Tecmo | Fighting | 2 | |
| Dead or Alive ++ | — | 1998 | Tecmo | Fighting | 2 | |
| Dead or Alive 2 | — | 1999 | Tecmo | Fighting | 2 | |
| Dead or Alive 2 Millennium | — | 2000 | Tecmo | Fighting | 2 | |
| Deal 'Em | — | 1987 | Zenitone | | | |
| The Dealer (Visco) | — | 1988 | Visco | | | |
| Dealer's Choice | — | 1983 | Merit | | | |
| Death Crimson OX | — | 2000 | Ecole | | | NAOMI cart. |
| Death Race | — | 1976 | Exidy | Driving / Vehicular combat | 2 | |
| Deathsmiles | — | 2007 | Cave | | | |
| Deathsmiles II: Makai no Merrychristmas | — | 2009 | Cave | | | |
| Deathsmiles Mega Black label | — | 2008 | Cave | | | |
| Decathlete | — | 1996 | Sega | | | |
| Deer Hunting USA | — | 2000 | Sammy | | | |
| Deep Scan | Invinco / Deep Scan (2-in-1 arcade cabinet) | 1979 | Sega | Fixed Shooter | 2 | |
| Defend the Terra Attack on the Red UFO | — | 1981 | Uko | | | |
| Defender | — | 1981 | Williams | Scrolling shooter | 2 | |
| Delta Command | — | 1988 | Arcadia Systems | Action | 2 | Arcadia |
| Deluxe 5 | Deluxe 4 U | 2000 | Excellent Soft Design | | | |
| Deluxe Trivia Whiz | — | 1987 | Merit | | | |
| Demolish Fist | — | 2003 | Polygon Magic / Dimps | | | |
| Demolition Derby | Sarge | 1984 | Bally Midway | Racing | 4 | |
| Demon | — | 1982 | Rock-Ola | Multi-directional shooter | 2 | |
| Demon Front | — | 2002 | IGS | Run and Gun | 2 | |
| Demon's World | Horror Story ^{JP} | 1990 | Toaplan | Platform game | 2 | |
| Demoneye-X | — | 1981 | Irem | | | |
| Dengen Tenshi Taisen Janshi - Shangri-la: Cyber Angel Mahjong Battle | — | 1999 | Ecole | | | NAOMI cart. |
| Denjin Makai | — | 1994 | Banpresto | | | |
| Densha de Go! | — | 1996 | Taito | | 1 | |
| Densha De Go! 2 Kosoku-hen | — | 1998 | Taito | | 1 | |
| Densha De Go! 2 Kosoku-hen 3000-bandai | — | 1998 | Taito | | 1 | |
| Densha De Go! 3 Tsukin-hen | — | 2000 | Taito | | 1 | |
| Densha De Go! 3 Tsukin-hen Daiya Kaisei | — | 2000 | Taito | | 1 | |
| Densha De Go! EX | — | 1997 | Taito | | 1 | |
| Depthcharge | Sub Hunter | 1977 | Gremlin Industries | Scrolling shooter | 1 | |
| Derby Owners Club | — | 1999 | Sega | | | |
| Derby Owners Club 2000 | — | 2000 | Sega | | | |
| Derby Owners Club II | — | 2001 | Sega | | | |
| Derby Owners Club World Edition | — | 2001 | Sega | | | |
| Derby Quiz My Dream Horse | — | 1998 | Namco | | | |
| Deroon DeroDero | — | 1996 | Tecmo | | | |
| Desert Assault | Thunder Zone ^{JP} | 1991 | Data East | Shoot 'em up | 4 | |
| Desert Breaker | — | 1992 | Sega | | 2 | |
| Desert Dan | — | 1982 | Video Optics | | | |
| Desert Gun | Road Runner (Midway) | 1977 | Midway | Shooter game | 1 | |
| Desert Gunner | — | 2006 | Global VR | | | |
| Desert Patrol | — | 1977 | Project Support Engineering | | | |
| Desert Tank | — | 1994 | Sega/ Martin Marietta | | | |
| Desert War | — | 1995 | Jaleco | | | |
| Destroyer (Atari) | — | 1977 | Atari | Action | 1 | |
| Destroyer (Cidelsa) | — | 1980 | Cidelsa | | | |
| The Destroyer From Jail | — | 1991 | Four J International | | | |
| Destruction Derby | Demolition Derby (Chicago Coin Machine) | 1975 | Exidy | | | |
| Devastators | — | 1988 | Konami | | | |
| Devil Fish | — | 1982 | Artic Electronics | | | |
| Devil Zone | — | 1980 | Universal | | 2 | |
| Dharma Doujou: Mezase, Tachimaro Ou | — | 1994 | Metro | | | |
| Diamond Run | — | 1989 | KH Video | | | |
| Dice: The Dice Game! | — | 1991 | Tuning | Maze game | | |
| Die Hard Arcade | Dynamite Deka ^{JP} | 1996 | Sega | Beat 'em up | 2 | |
| Diet Family | — | 2001 | SemiCom | | | |
| Diet Go Go | — | 1992 | Data East | | | |
| Dig Dug | — | 1982 | Namco | Action | 2 | |
| Dig Dug II | — | 1985 | Namco | Action | 2 | |
| Digger (Century Electronics) | — | 1982 | Century Electronics | | | |
| Digger (Gremlin) | — | 1980 | Gremlin | | | |
| Dimahoo | Great Mahou Daisakusen ^{JP} | 2000 | Eighting/Razing | Scrolling shooter | 2 | CPS2 |
| Dingo | — | 1983 | ACG | | | |
| Dino Rex | — | 1992 | Taito | | | |
| Dirt Dash | — | 1995 | Namco | | 1 | |
| Dirt Devils | — | 1998 | Sega | Racing | | Sega Model 3 |
| Dirt Fox | — | 1989 | Namco | Racing | 4 | |
| Dirty Drivin' | — | 2011 | Raw Thrills | Racing Game | | |
| Dirty Pigskin Football | — | 2004 | Sammy | | | |
| Disco Boy | — | 1993 | Soft Art | | | |
| Disco Mahjong: Otachidai no Okite | — | 1995 | Sphinx | | | |
| Disco No.1 | — | 1982 | Data East | | | |
| Discs of Tron | — | 1983 | Bally Midway | Action | 1 | |
| Disney Magical Dance on Dream Stage | — | 2007 | Sega | | | NAOMI cart. |
| Diverboy | — | 1992 | Electronic Devices | | | |
| DJ Boy | — | 1989 | Kaneko / American Sammy (US license) | Beat 'em up | 2 | |
| DJMax Technika | — | 2008 | Pentavision | Music game | 1 | |
| DJMax Technika 2 | — | 2010 | Pentavision | Music game | 2 | |
| DJMax Technika 3 | — | 2010 | Pentavision | Music game | 2 | |
| Do! Run Run | Super Pierrot | 1984 | Universal | Platform game | 2 | |
| Dock Man | Port Man | 1982 | Taito | | 1 | |
| Dodge City | — | 1983 | Merit | | | |
| Dodge Man | — | 1983 | Omori Electric Company | | | |
| Dodgem | — | 1979 | Zaccaria | | | |
| DoDonPachi | — | 1997 | CAVE | Scrolling shooter | 2 | |
| DoDonPachi Dai-Ou-Jou | — | 2002 | CAVE | Scrolling shooter | 2 | |
| DoDonPachi Daifukkatsu | — | 2008 | CAVE | Scrolling shooter | 2 | |
| DoDonPachi Daifukkatsu Black Label | — | 2008 | CAVE | Scrolling shooter | 2 | |
| DoDonPachi SaiDaiOuJou | — | 2012 | CAVE | Scrolling shooter | 2 | CAVE CV1000D |
| Dog Fight | — | 1983 | Thunderbolt | Scrolling shooter | | |
| Dog Patch | — | 1978 | Bally Midway | Action | | |
| Dog Station Deluxe | — | 2002 | Konami | Simulation | | |
| Dogyuun | — | 1992 | Toaplan | Scrolling shooter | 2 | |
| Dokaben: Visual Card Game | — | 1989 | Capcom | Sports | 2 | |
| Dokaben 2 | — | 1989 | Capcom | Sports | 2 | |
| Doki Doki Idol Star Seeker | — | 2001 | G.Rev | | | NAOMI GD-ROM |
| Doki Doki Penguin Land | — | 1985 | Sega | Action | 2 | |
| Dolmen | — | 1995 | Afega | | | |
| Dolphin Blue | — | 2003 | Sammy | Action | 2 | |
| Domino Block | — | 1996 | Wonwoo Systems | | | |
| Domino Man | — | 1982 | Bally Midway | Action | 2 | |
| Dominos | — | 1977 | Atari | Action | 2 | |
| Dommy | — | 1983 | Technos Japan | | | |
| Don Den Lover Vol. 1: Shiro Kuro Tsukeyo! | — | 1995 | Dynax | | | |
| Don Den Mahjong | — | 1986 | Dyna Electronics | | | |
| Don Doko Don | — | 1989 | Taito | Action, Platformer | 2 | |
| Donchan Puzzle Hanabi de Doon! | — | 2003 | Aruze | Puzzle | 2 | Aleck64 |
| Donggul Donggul Haerong | — | 2001 | Danbi System | | | |
| Donkey Kong | — | 1981 | Nintendo | Platform game | 2 | |
| Donkey Kong 3 | — | 1983 | Nintendo | Shooter | 2 | |
| Donkey Kong Jr. | — | 1982 | Nintendo | Platform game | 2 | |
| DonPachi | — | 1995 | Atlus | Scrolling shooter | 2 | |
| DonPachi: Kokunai Satsuei-you Version | — | 1995 | Atlus | Scrolling shooter | 2 | |
| Dorachan | — | 1980 | Craul Denshi | | | |
| Doraemon | — | 1999 | NMK | | | |
| Dorodon | — | 1982 | Falcon | | | |
| Double Axle | ^{Power Wheels} | 1991 | Taito | Racing | 2 | |
| Double Dealer | — | 1991 | NMK | | | |
| Double Dragon | — | 1987 | Technōs Japan | Beat 'em up | 2 | |
| Double Dragon II: The Revenge | — | 1988 | Technōs Japan | Beat 'em up | 2 | |
| Double Dragon III: The Rosetta Stone | — | 1990 | Technōs Japan | Beat 'em up | 3 | |
| Double Dragon (Neo-Geo game) | — | 1995 | Technōs Japan | | | NeoGeo |
| Double Dribble | — | 1986 | Konami | | | |
| Double Play | Extra Inning | 1977 | Midway | | 1 | |
| Double Point | — | 1995 | Min Corporation | | | |
| Double Up | — | 1981 | Cal Omega | | | |
| Double-Wings | — | 1993 | Mitchell Corporation | | | |
| DownTown | Mokugeki^{JP} | 1989 | Seta | Beat 'em up | 2 | |
| Dr. Micro | — | 1983 | Sanritsu | | | |
| Dr. Tomy | — | 1983 | Playmark | | | |
| Dr. Toppel's Adventure | Dr. Toppel's Tankentai^{JP} | 1987 | Taito | | | |
| Draco | — | 1981 | Cidelsa | | | |
| Drag Race | — | 1977 | Atari | Racing | 2 | |
| Dragon Ball Z | — | 1993 | Banpresto | Fighting | 2 | |
| Dragon Ball Z 2: Super Battle | — | 1994 | Banpresto | Fighting | 2 | |
| Dragon Ball Z: V.R.V.S. | — | 1994 | Sega / Banpresto | Fighting | 2 | Sega System 32 |
| Dragon Blaze | — | 2000 | Psikyo | Vertical shooter | 2 | |
| Dragon Breed | — | 1989 | Irem | Scrolling shooter | 2 | |
| Dragon Buster | — | 1984 | Namco | | 2 | |
| Dragon Chronicle: Legend of the Master Ark | — | 2002 | Namco | | | |
| Dragon Punch | Sports Match | 1989 | Dynax | | | |
| Dragon Master | — | 1994 | Unico Electronics | Fighting | 2 | |
| Dragon Quest: Monster Battle Road | — | 2007 | Square Enix | | | |
| Dragon Saber | — | 1990 | Namco | Scrolling shooter | 2 | |
| Dragon Spirit | — | 1987 | Namco | Scrolling shooter | 2 | Namco System 1 |
| Dragon World | Dong Fang Zhi Zhu^{HK} Zhong Guo Long^{CN} | 1995 | IGS | | | |
| Dragon World 2 | Chuugoku Ryuu II^{JP} Zhong Guo Long 2^{CN} | 1997 | IGS | | | |
| Dragon World 2001 | — | 2001 | IGS | | | |
| Dragon World 3 | — | 1998 | IGS | | | |
| Dragon World 3 EX | — | 2000 | IGS | | | |
| Dragon World 3 Special | — | 1998 | IGS | | | |
| Dragon World Pretty Chance | — | 1998 | IGS | | | |
| Dragon's Lair | — | 1983 | Cinematronics | Interactive movie | 2 | |
| Dragon's Lair II: Time Warp | — | 1991 | Leland Corp | Interactive movie | 2 | |
| Dragongun - Firebrand, Gun of the Ark-Magi | — | 1993 | Data East | | | |
| Dragoon Might | — | 1995 | Konami | Fighting | 2 | |
| Drakton | — | 1984 | Epos Corporation | | | |
| Dramatic Adventure Quiz Keith & Lucy | — | 1993 | Visco | | | |
| Draw 80 Poker (IGT) | — | 1982 | IGT / Sircoma | | | |
| Draw Poker (Amstar) | — | 1982 | Amstar | | | |
| Draw Poker (Game-A-Tron) | — | 1983 | Game-A-Tron | | | |
| Draw Poker: Joker's Wild | — | 1984 | Meyco Games | | | |
| Dream Ball | — | 1992 | NDK | | | |
| Dream Hunting | — | 2002 | Game Box | | | |
| Dream Shopper | — | 1982 | Sanritsu | | | |
| Dream Soccer '94 | — | 1994 | Irem | Sports | 2 | |
| Dream World | — | 2000 | SemiCom | | | |
| Dribbling | — | 1983 | Model Racing | | | |
| Drift Out | — | 1991 | Visco | | | |
| Drift Out '94 - The Hard Order | — | 1994 | Visco | | | |
| Driver's Edge | — | 1994 | Incredible Technologies / Strata (publisher) | Racing | 1 | |
| Driver's Eyes | — | 1987 | Namco | Racing | 1 | |
| Driving Force | — | 1984 | Shinkai Inc. | | | |
| DrumMania | Percussion Freaks | 1999 | Konami | Music | | |
| DrumMania 2ndMix | Percussion Freaks 2ndMix | 2000 | Konami | Music | | |
| DrumMania 3rdMix | Percussion Freaks 3rdMix | 2000 | Konami | Music | | |
| DrumMania 4thMix | Percussion Freaks 4thMix | 2001 | Konami | Music | | |
| DrumMania 5thMix | Percussion Freaks 5thMix | 2001 | Konami | Music | | |
| DrumMania 6thMix | Percussion Freaks 6thMix | 2002 | Konami | Music | | |
| DrumMania 7thMix | Percussion Freaks 7thMix | 2002 | Konami | Music | | |
| DrumMania 8thMix | Percussion Freaks 8thMix | 2003 | Konami | Music | | |
| DrumMania 9thMix | Percussion Freaks 9thMix | 2003 | Konami | Music | | |
| DrumMania 10thMix | Percussion Freaks 10thMix | 2004 | Konami | Music | | |
| DrumMania V | Percussion Freaks | 2005 | Konami | Music | | |
| DrumMania V2 | Percussion Freaks | 2005 | Konami | Music | | |
| DrumMania V3 | Percussion Freaks | 2006 | Konami | Music | | |
| DS Telejan | — | 1981 | Data East | | | DECO |
| Dual Assault | Liberation^{JP} | 1984 | Data East | Scrolling shooter | 1 | |
| Dungeon Magic | Light Bringer | 1994 | Taito | Beat 'em up | 2 | |
| Dungeons & Dragons: Shadow over Mystara | — | 1996 | Capcom | Beat 'em up | 4 | CPS2 |
| Dungeons & Dragons: Tower of Doom | — | 1994 | Capcom | Beat 'em up | 4 | CPS2 |
| Dunk Dream | — | 1994 | Data East | | NeoGeo | |
| Dunk Mania | — | 1995 | Namco | Sports | 4 | |
| Dunk Shot | — | 1986 | Sega | Sports | 2 | |
| DVD Select | — | 2000 | Nichibutsu | | | Nichibutsu High Rate DVD |
| Dwarfs Den | — | 1981 | ESI | | | |
| Dyger | — | 1989 | PhilKo Corporation | Scrolling shooter | 1 | |
| Dyna Gear | — | 1994 | American Sammy | Beat 'em up | 2 | |
| Dynamic C.C. - Dynamic Country Club | — | 1991 | Sega | | | |
| Dynamic Golf | — | 2001 | Sega | | | NAOMI GD-ROM |
| Dynamic Shooting | — | 1988 | Jaleco | | | |
| Dynamic Ski | — | 1984 | Taiyo / Nichibutsu | | | |
| Dynamic-Dice | — | 198? | | | | |
| Dynamite Baseball | — | 1996 | Sega | | | |
| Dynamite Baseball '97 | — | 1997 | Sega | | | |
| Dynamite Baseball '99 | — | 1999 | Sega | | | NAOMI cart. |
| Dynamite Baseball NAOMI | — | 1998 | Sega | | | NAOMI cart. |
| Dynamite Bomber | — | 2000 | Limenko | | | |
| Dynamite Cop | Dynamite Deka II: Karibu no Kaizoku Hen^{JP} | 1998 | Sega AM1 | Beat 'em up | | |
| Dynamite Duke | The Double Dynamites (2-player version) | 1989 | Seibu Kaihatsu | Action | 2 | |
| Dynamite Düx | — | 1988 | Sega | Beat 'em up | 2 | |
| Dynamite League | — | 1989 | Taito | Sports | 2 | |
| Dynasty Wars | Tenchi wo Kurau ^{JP} | 1989 | Capcom | Beat 'em up | 2 | CPS1 |
