= List of arcade video games: A =

This is a list of arcade video games organized alphabetically by name. It does not include PC or console games unless they were also released in video arcades. See Lists of video games for related lists.

Title	Alternate Title(s)	Year	Manufacturer	Genre(s)	Max. Players	PCB Model
A Day in Space	—	1987	EFO SA			
A Question of Sport	—	1992	Bell-Fruit Manufacturing	Quiz	1	
A-Jax	Typhoon ^{JP}	1987	Konami	Scrolling shooter	2	
A.B. Cop	—	1990	Aicom; Sega	Sports	1	
A.D. 2083	—	1983	Midcoin	Multidirectional shooter	2	
A.P.B.	—	1987	Atari Games	Driving	1	
Aaargh!	—	1987	Arcadia Systems	Fighting	2	Arcadia
Abnormal Check	—	1997	Namco	Sports	2	
Abunai Houkago - Mou Matenai	—	1989	Green Soft	Hanafada game	2	
Ace	—	1976	Allied Leisure	Multidirectional shooter	2	
Ace Attacker	—	1988	Sega	Sports	2	
Ace Driver	—	1994	Namco	Sports	2	
Ace Driver: Victory Lap	—	1996	Namco	Sports	2	
Ace Driver 3: Final Turn	—	2008	Namco	Sports	2	
Acrobat Mission	—	1991	Taito	Scrolling shooter	2	
Acrobatic Dog-Fight	Dog-Fight: Batten O'Hara no Sucharaka Kuuchuu-sen ^{JP}	1984	Technōs Japan	Scrolling shooter	2	
Act-Fancer: Cybernetick Hyper Weapon	—	1989	Data East	Platformer	2	
Action Fighter	—	1986	Sega	Scrolling shooter	2	
Action Hollywood	—	1995	TCH	Maze	2	
Adventure Canoe	—	1982	Taito	Action	2	
Aero Fighters	Sonic Wings ^{JP}	1992	Video System	Scrolling shooter	2	
Aero Fighters 2	Sonic Wings 2 ^{JP}	1994	Video System	Scrolling shooter	2	NeoGeo
Aero Fighters 3	Sonic Wings 3 ^{JP}	1995	Video System	Scrolling shooter	2	NeoGeo
Aero Fighters Special	Sonic Wings Limited ^{JP}	1996	Video System	Scrolling shooter	2	ZN-1
After Burner	—	1987	Sega	Rail shooter	1	
After Burner II	—	1987	Sega	Rail shooter	1	
After Burner Climax	—	2006	Sega	Rail shooter	1	
The Age of Heroes: Silkroad 2	—	2000	Unico	Beat 'em up	2	
Agent Super Bond	—	1985	Signatron USA	Maze	1	
Aggressors of Dark Kombat	Tsuukai Gangan Koushinkyoku	1994	SNK	Fighting	2	NeoGeo
Agress: Missile Daisenryaku	—	1991	Palco	Strategy	2	
Ah Eikou No Koshien	—	1991	Taito	Sports	2	
Air Assault	Fire Barrel ^{JP}	1993	Irem	Scrolling shooter	2	
Air Attack	—	1996	Comad	Scrolling shooter	2	
Air Buster	Aero Blasters	1990	Kaneko	Scrolling shooter	2	
Air Combat	—	1992	Namco	Flight combat	1	
Air Combat 22	—	1995	Namco	Flight combat	1	
Air Duel	—	1990	Irem	Scrolling shooter	2	
Air Gallet	—	1996	Banpresto	Scrolling shooter	2	
Air Inferno	—	1990	Taito	Flight combat	1	
Air Raid	Cross Shooter	1987	Seibu Kaihatsu	Vertical shooter	2	
Air Rescue	—	1991	Sega	Flight combat	2	Sega System 32
Air Strike	—	2002	Tsunami Visual Technologies	Flight combat	1	
Air Trix	—	2001	Sega	Skateboarding	1	
Airline Pilots	—	1999	Sega	Piloting	1	
Airwolf	—	1987	Kyugo	Flight combat	2	Kyugo
Akatsuki Blitzkampf Ausf. Achse	—	2008	Subtle Style	Fighting	2	NAOMI cart.
Akai Katana	—	2010	Cave	Scrolling shooter	2	
Akazukin	—	1984	Sigma Enterprises			
Alex Kidd: The Lost Stars	—	1986	Sega	Platformer	2	
Ali Baba and 40 Thieves	—	1982	Sega	Maze	2	
Alien³: The Gun	—	1993	Sega	Shooting	2	Sega System 32
Alien Arena	—	1985	Duncan Brown software	Multi-directional shooter	2	
Alien Challenge	—	1994	IGS Company	Fighting game	2	
Alien Crush	—	1989	Hudson Soft	Action game	2	
Alien Invaders	—	1980	Forbes	Shooter	1	
Alien Storm	—	1990	Sega	Shooter	2	
Alien Syndrome	—	1987	Sega	Maze / Shooter Large	2	
Alien vs. Predator	—	1994	Capcom	Beat 'em up	3	CPS2
Alienfront: Team Based Combat	—	2001	Sega			NAOMI GD-ROM
Aliens	—	1990	Konami	Platformer / Shooter Scrolling	2	
All American Football	—	1989	Leland	Sports	4	
Alley Master	Up Your Alley	1986	Cinematronics	Sports		
Alley Rally	—	1976	Exidy	Racing	2	
Alligator Hunt	—	1994	Gaelco	Cabal	2	
Alone Shettle Crew	—	1984	New Digimatic			
Alpha Fighter	—	1980	Data East	Racing	1	
Alpha Mission	ASO ^{JP}	1985	SNK	Scrolling shooter	1	NeoGeo
Alpha Mission II	ASO II: Last Guardian ^{JP}	1991	SNK	Scrolling shooter	2	
Alpha One	—	1988	Vision Electronics	Scrolling shooter	2	
Alpine Racer	—	1995	Namco	Racing	1	
Alpine Racer 2	—	1996	Namco	Racing	1	
Alpine Ski	—	1981	Taito	Sports	2	
Alpine Surfer	—	1996	Namco	Sports	1	
Altair	—	1981	Cidelsa	Shooter	2	
Altair II	—	1982	Cidelsa	Shooter	2	
Altered Beast	Juuouki	1988	Sega	Beat 'em up	2	
The Amazing Adventures of Mr. F. Lea	—	1982	Pacific Novelty	Platform game	2	
The Amazing Maze Game	—	1976	Bally Midway	Maze		
Ambush	—	1973	Williams Electronics	Shooting gallery	2	
American Horseshoes	—	1990	Taito	Sports		
American Speedway	—	1987	Enerdyne	Racing	2	
AmeriDarts	—	1989	Ameri	Sports	2	
Amidar	—	1981	Konami / Stern (license)	Maze	2	
Amusement Poker	—	1983	Cal Omega	Poker	1	
Andro Dunos	—	1992	SNK	Scrolling shooter	2	NeoGeo
Andromeda	—	1979	IPM	Shooter	1	
Angel Kids	—	1988	Sega	Shooter		
Angler Dangler	—	1982	Data East	Sports	2	
Angler King	—	1998	Namco	Sports	1	
Animal Basket	Hustle Tamaire Kyousou ^{JP}	2005	Sammy Corporation	Sports	2	
Animal Kaiser: The King of Animals	—	2008	Namco Bandai Games			
Anime Champ	—	2000	Konami	Party games		
Anteater	Ameisenbaer ^{DE} The Anteater ^{UK}	1982	Tago Electronics	Maze		
Anti-Aircraft	—	1975	Atari	Shooter	2	
Apache 3	—	1988	Tatsumi			
Apparel Night	—	1986	Central Denshi			
Appoooh: The Pro-Wrestling Game	—	1994	Sega	Fighting	2	
Aqua Jack	—	1990	Taito	Shooter		
Aqua Jet	—	1996	Namco			
Aqua Rush	—	1999	Namco	Puzzle	2	
Aquarium	—	1996	Excellent System	Puzzle	2	
Arabian	—	1983	Sun Electronics	Platform game	2	
Arabian Fight	—	1991	Sega	Beat 'em up	4	Sega System 32
Arabian Magic	—	1992	Taito	Hack and Slash	4	
Arbalester	—	1989	SETA, Taito	Scrolling shooter	2	
Arcadia	—	2006	NMK		2	
Arcana Heart	Arcana Heart FULL!	2006	Yuki Enterprise	Fighting	2	
Arch Rivals	—	1989	Bally Midway	Sports		
Arctic Thunder	—	2001	Midway Games	Racing		
Area 51	—	1995	Atari Games	Shooting gallery	2	
Area 51: Site 4	—	1998	Atari Games	Shooting gallery	2	
Argus	—	1986	Jaleco			
Ark Area	—	1988	UPL	Scrolling Shooter	2	
Arkanoid	—	1986	Taito	Breakout	2	
Arkanoid Returns	—	1997	Taito	Breakout	2	
Arkanoid: Revenge of Doh	—	1987	Taito	Breakout	2	
Arlington Horse Racing	—	1990	Strata; Incredible Technologies			
Arm Champs	—	1988	Jaleco			
Arm Champs II	—	1992	Jaleco			
Arm Wrestling	—	1985	Nintendo	Sports	1	
Armadillo Racing	—	1997	Namco	Racing	4	
Armed Formation	—	1988	Nichibutsu	Scrolling shooter	2	
Armed Police Batrider	—	1998	8ing/Raizing	Scrolling shooter	2	
Armor Attack	—	1980	Cinematronics	Shooter game	2	
Armored Car	—	1981	Stern Electronics	Maze	2	
Armored Warriors	Powered Gear - Strategic Variant Armor Equipment ^{JP}	1994	Capcom	Beat 'em up	3	CPS2
Arrow Bingo	—	1985	Advanced Video Technology		1	
Art of Fighting	Ryuuko no Ken^{JP}	1992	SNK	Fighting	2	NeoGeo
Art of Fighting 2	Ryuuko no Ken 2^{JP}	1994	SNK	Fighting	2	NeoGeo
Art of Fighting 3	Ryuuko no Ken Gaiden^{JP}	1996	SNK	Fighting	2	NeoGeo
Ashura Blaster	—	1990	Taito			
Asian Dynamite	—	2007	Sega			NAOMI cart.
Assault	—	1988	Namco	Multi-directional shooter	1	
Assault Plus	—	1988	Namco	Multi-directional shooter	1	
Asterix	—	1992	Konami	Beat 'em up		
Asteroids	Super Meteor ^{JP}	1979	Atari	Multi-directional shooter	2	
Asteroids Deluxe	—	1980	Atari	Multi-directional shooter	2	
Astra Superstars	—	1998	Sunsoft; Tecmo	Fighting		
Astrians	—	1980	BGV	Multi-directional shooter	2	
Astro Blaster	—	1981	Sega	Scrolling shooter	2	
Astro Chase	—	1982	First Star Software / Exidy (license)	Shooter	4	
Astro Fantasia	—	1981	Data East	Scrolling shooter	2	
Astro Fighter	Astro Combat; Astro-Battle^{IT}	1979	Data East	Scrolling shooter	2	
Astro Invader	Kamikaze^{JP}	1980	Stern Electronics	Shooter	2	
Astron Belt	—	1983	Sega	Shooter	1	
The Astyanax	The Lord of King ^{JP}	1989	Jaleco	Platformer		
Asuka & Asuka	—	1988	Taito	Scrolling shooter	2	
Asura Blade: Sword of Dynasty	—	1998	Fuuki	Fighting		
Asura Buster: Eternal Warriors	—	2000	Fuuki	Fighting		
Atari Baseball	—	1979	Atari	Sports	4	
Atari Basketball	—	1979	Atari	Sports	4	
Atari Football	—	1978	Atari	Sports	4	
Atari Soccer	—	1979	Atari	Sports	4	
Ataxx	—	1991	Leland	Strategy / Puzzle	2	
Athena	—	1986	SNK	Platformer	2	
Athena No Hatena?	—	1993	Athena	Quiz	2	
Atlantic City Action	Boardwalk Casino	1984	Epos	Card game	1	
Atomic Boy	Wily Tower	1985	Irem			
Atomic Point	—	1990	Philko			
Atomic Robo-Kid	—	1986	UPL	Shooter	1	
Attack	—	1976	Taito			
Attack Force	—	1979	EGS			
Attack Pla-Rail	—	1998	Namco			
Attack UFO	—	1980	Ryoto Electric			
ATV Track:Quads on Amazon	—	2002	Gaelco	Racing		
Aurail	—	1990	Sega	Scrolling Shooter	2	
AV Hanafuda Hana no Ageman	—	1990	Nichibutsu	Hanafuda game	1	
AV Hanafuda Hana no Christmas Eve	—	1990	Nichibutsu	Hanafuda game	1	
AV Mahjong: Two-Shot	—	1990	Nichibutsu	Mahjong game	1	
AV Mahjong: Yanchana Koneko	—	1990	Nichibutsu	Mahjong game	1	
AV2 Mahjong No.1 Bay Bridge no Seijo	—	1991	Miki Shoji	Mahjong game	1	
AV2 Mahjong No.2 Rouge no Kaori	—	1991	Miki Shoji	Mahjong game	1	
Avalanche	Cascade ^{IT}	1978	Atari	Action	2	
Avenger	—	1975	Electra Games	Shooting	1	
Avengers	Hissatsu Buraiken ^{JP}	1987	Capcom	Action	2	
Avengers in Galactic Storm	—	1995	Data East	Fighting	2	
Avenging Spirit	Phantasm ^{JP}	1991	Jaleco	Platform game	2	
Aztarac	—	1983	Centuri	Multi-directional shooter	2	
Azumanga Daioh Puzzle Bobble	—	2001	Taito			NAOMI GD-ROM
Azurian Attack	—	1982	Rait Electronics	Multidirectional shooter	2	
