= Kyūkai Dōchūki =

1990 video game

- Promotional flyer
- Developer: Namco
- Publisher: Namco
- Series: Dōchūki
- Platforms: Arcade, Mega Drive
- Release: Arcade: JP: May 1990; Mega Drive: JP: July 12, 1991
- Genre: Sports
- Modes: Single-player, multiplayer

Kyūkai Dōchūki (Note: Japanese: 球界道中記, Hepburn: Kyūkai Dōchūki; lit. Baseball World Traveler's Journal) is a baseball arcade game that was released by Namco in 1990 in Japan; it runs on Namco System 2 hardware, and is a spin-off of Yokai Dochuki. The gameplay is similar to Namco's own World Stadium series, except that both players have a total of thirty-six different teams to choose from in the Japanese, Arabic, German, Humbaba, American, Russian, and Chinese leagues. The Japan League has five stadiums, and if the player selects one team from it, the game will randomly decide which stadium the match will take place in, but the other leagues only have one stadium. This game also features a cameo re-appearance, from Valkyrie (as in no Densetsu), who appears to report the final outcome of a match once it has finished. Namco's signature character Pac-Man can also be seen on two of the television screens in a studio wearing a purple bow tie (in his Pac-Land-style anthropomorphized form, as opposed to his "original" one).

== Gameplay and development ==
Arcade version screenshot.

Kyūkai Dōchūki is a baseball video game. It is a spin-off of Yokai Dochuki, an older Namco arcade game from 1987 that has the distinction of being the company's first 16-bit video game. The name is also a play on the title of the latter; "yakyu" is the Japanese word for baseball, which the development team thought sounded similar to the "yokai". Gameplay itself draws inspiration from Namco's Family Stadium franchise and its sister series World Stadium, with large, caricature-like players and a more comical, "super-deformed" appearance. It ran on the Namco System 2 arcade system board, which previously powered games like Valkyrie no Densetsu, Burning Force, and Final Lap. A home conversion for the Mega Drive was released in Japan on July 12, 1991.

== Reception ==
Reception

Review scores
| Publication | Score |
|---|---|
| Famitsu | 26/40 |
| Beep! Mega Drive | 7.25/10 |
| Mega Drive Fan | 20.79/30 |
| Mega Drive Encyclopedia | Positive |

In Japan, Game Machine claimed that Kyūkai Dōchūki was the thirteenth most popular arcade game of June 1990.

The Mega Drive home conversion of Kyūkai Dōchūki was met with mostly mixed to positive reviews from critics, often being compared to Namco's own Family Stadium series for its colorful graphics and character designs. The game's humor, stadiums and controls were praised, although some felt that it wasn't as refined as Namco's other sports video games.

Famitsu magazine favorably compared the game to the Family Stadium series for its cartoonish visuals and similar art direction, while also liking its bizarre stadium settings and humor. Mega Drive Fan had a similar response, finding its unique settings and character designs to make it stand out among other baseball games released for the console. Beep! Mega Drive praised the more "open" stadiums compared to the Family Stadium games and its responsive controls, alongside its cute character designs. The 2004 book Mega Drive Encyclopedia liked the overall gameplay and style, finding it to be superior than most other sports games on the Mega Drive. They also praised the stadiums for having different characteristics, such as the ball sliding across the ice in the Antarctic-themed stadium.

Beep! Mega Drive found that the game could potentially put-off fans of the Family Stadium series and other similar games, saying its controls and mechanics took some time to get used to. Mega Drive Fan felt the same way, saying that it felt dated compared to the Family Stadium and World Stadium games for its limited number of modes and vastly different controls. Famitsu disliked the game for not feeling as refined as Namco's other sports games for consoles, while Mega Drive Encyclopedia wrote that it did not have the same amount of replay value as games like Family Stadium or J-League Soccer Prime Goal.
