= Burning Force =

1989 video game

- Promotional sales flyer
- Developer: Namco
- Publisher: Namco
- Composer: Yoshinori Kawamoto
- Platforms: Arcade, Sega Genesis
- Release: Arcade: JP: November 1989; Genesis: JP: May 17, 1991; NA: 1990; EU: December 1991
- Genre: Third-person shooter
- Modes: Single-player, multiplayer
- Arcade system: Namco System 2

Burning Force (Note: Japanese: バーニングフォース, Hepburn: Bāningu Fōsu) is a 1989 third-person shooter video game developed and published by Namco for arcades. It was initially released only in Japan in November 1989. A port for the Sega Genesis was released worldwide a year later. The player assumes control of the woman space cadet Hiromi Tengenji, a pilot training to become a member of the Space Force, who must complete each level by shooting down enemies with her airbike and avoiding projectiles. Gameplay is similar to Space Harrier, featuring a fixed camera position behind the player and having similar mechanics. It runs on the Namco System 2 arcade hardware.

== Gameplay ==
Screenshot of the arcade version

In Burning Force, the player controls a space cadet named Hiromi Tengenji (天現寺ひろみ, Tengenji Hiromi), who as part of her final training, must battle high-tech enemies through six worlds of four areas on a futuristic airbike named "Sign Duck". The gameplay is similar to that of Sega's Space Harrier, but the worlds are divided into four areas and there is no vertical mobility making the game different in its own right; in the first two sections the player controls Hiromi on the airbike, which can move to the left and right, as well as braking and accelerating - and the airbike can also fire bullets and missiles at the enemies. The third area of every world is a boss area and the airbike will be transformed into a flying ship which can move in all directions; the fourth area of each world, however, is a bonus stage and the player has to collect as many spheres (which have numbers on them) as possible for bonus points.

== Reception ==
Reception

Review scores
Publication	Score
ACE	69/100
Famitsu	25/40

In Japan, Game Machine listed Burning Force on their December 1, 1989 issue as being the ninth most-popular table arcade game at the time.

The Sega Genesis / Mega Drive received mixed and mostly mediocre reviews in the West upon the release, including 4/10 from ASM, 5/10 from Génération 4, 71% from Joystick, 51% from Power Play, and 77% from RAZE, which opined "Space Harrier is too old a formula to be successful nowadays." The New Straits Times, in October 1990, dismissed the game as "yet another ... in the line of Space Harrier clones." It also had mediocre sales.

Retrospectively, Hardcore Gaming 101's Kurt Kalata opined it "is among the better of [Space Harrier] clones, not only because it's based on more powerful arcade hardware (the Namco System 2, which ran Phelios and Valkyrie no Densetsu, amongst others), but also because it puts its own unique spin on the formula." Next Generation listed the Genesis version at number 93 in their "Top 100 Games of All Time", explaining that "what earns Burning Force its place on this list is level design, the fact that no enemies are repeated from level to level, and the stunning design of the bosses."

== Legacy ==
Hiromi Tengenji went on to reappear in an advertisement on an airship in Mach Breakers (along with Pac-Man, Prince Gil and Priestess Ki from The Tower of Druaga, Wonder Momo, Valkyrie from Valkyrie no Densetsu, and Pitto and Patti from Tinkle Pit) and also appeared in the Namco System 12-era World Stadium games as the Nikotama Gals' defensive half. She is one of player's party characters in Namco x Capcom, where she is partners with Masuyo "Kissy" Toby, the main character of the Baraduke games. In ShiftyLook's Namco dating sim Namco High, she appears as one of 18 dateable characters. Namco Game Sound Express Vol. 02 - Burning Force, published by Victor Entertainment in 1990, contains the original soundtrack from Burning Force with compositions by Yoshinori Kawamoto.

Hamster Corporation released the arcade version outside of Japan for the first time as part of their Arcade Archives series for the Nintendo Switch and PlayStation 4 in October 2023.
