= Driving Force =

Driving Force may refer to:

== Arts and entertainment ==
- Driving Force (1921 film), a 1921 German silent film
- Driving Force, a 1984 arcade video game by Shinkai
- Driving Force (1989 film), a 1989 action film
- Driving Force, a 1992 novel by Dick Francis
- Driving Force, a 2005 album by 3rd Force
- Driving Force (TV series), a 2006–2007 American reality television program
- Driving Force (Casualty), the fortieth series of the television series Casualty (2023)

== Other uses ==
- Logitech Driving Force GT, a model of steering wheel

== See also ==
- Force, in physics
- Reversal potential, in a biological membrane
