= Märchen Maze =

1988 video game

- Japanese arcade flyer
- Developer: N.H. System
- Publisher: Namco
- Platforms: Arcade, PC Engine, X68000
- Release: Arcade: JP: July 1988; PC Engine: JP: December 11, 1990; X68000: JP: 1991
- Genre: Platform
- Modes: Single-player, multiplayer
- Arcade system: Namco System 1

Märchen Maze (Note: Japanese: メルヘンメイズ, Hepburn: Meruhen Meizu) is a 1988 platform video game developed by N.H. System and published by Namco for arcades. Controlling a young girl named Alice, the player must complete each of the game's nine stages while avoiding enemies and falling off ledges. Alice can blow powerful bubbles at enemies to knock them back, and can hit them enough times to send them off the platform. It is the first Japanese video game adaptation of Lewis Carroll's Alice's Adventures in Wonderland, and runs on the Namco System 1 arcade board.

Development was handled by N.H. System, a short-lived subsidiary of Namco, with character design by famed anime director Katsuhiko Nishijima. It is Namco's second game to feature a female protagonist, following Wonder Momo. The word Märchen (pronounced [ˈmɛːɐ̯çn̩] MEH-kh'n) is the German word for "fairy tale". The PC Engine version was released in 1990, which replaced the isometric view with an overhead one, followed by the 1991 X68000 port. Märchen Maze received mixed reviews; although its visuals and controls were praised, critics disliked the sharp rise in difficulty and mediocre boss fights.

== Gameplay ==
Arcade version screenshot

The player must take control of Alice, as she makes her way through nine isometric stages. Alice is able to blow bubbles at enemies to knock them off the platforms and she can collect various powerups along the way. Holding the fire button down generates bigger bubbles, but if it is held down for too long, it will burst and she will start blowing a new one. The enemies retaliate by shooting marbles at her (which can cause her to fall over the edge of the platforms unless they are avoided or jumped over). The seventh, eighth and ninth stages are palette-swapped versions of the second, fourth and first ones respectively, but they feature different enemy types and bosses.

== Plot ==
One night, Alice falls asleep while reading a fairy tale picture book and is awaken by a call from within a wall mirror. A rabbit appears in the mirror and tells her that his country and eight other lands has been conquered by an evil witch known as the Queen of Darkness and Alice is the only one who has love and courage to restore peace. The girl is pulled inside the mirror world and given a magic straw to attack with soap bubbles. After the Queen is defeated, Alice wakes up thinking it was just a nightmare, but finds the phrase "Thanks [sic] you!" written on the mirror and on a cake.

== Development and release ==
Märchen Maze was published by Namco in Japan for arcades in July 1988 — development itself was handled by N.H. System, a very short-lived subsidiary of Namco. It was the first Japanese video game adaptation of Alice in Wonderland, predating games such as TwinBee Yahho! and Fushigi no Yume no Alice. The word "märchen" is the German word for fairy tale. Character design was done by Katsuhiko Nishijima, who directed several well-regarded anime series such as Outlanders, Vampire Hunter D and Agent Aika. It is Namco's second video game to have a female protagonist, following Wonder Momo (1987). An English version of the game, titled Alice in Wonderland, is also known to exist. A version for the PC Engine was released in 1990, which replaced the isometric angle with an overhead view due to hardware restraints — character design for this port was done by Gundam artist Kouichi Tokita. A 1991 X68000 conversion was done by SPS, which is near-identical to the original. A digital download of the game was released for the Japanese Wii Virtual Console in 2009. Hamster Corporation re-released the game as part of the Arcade Archives series for the Nintendo Switch and PlayStation 4 in February 2025.

== Reception and legacy ==
Reception

Review scores
Publication	Score
Famitsu	25/40
Play Time	80/100
PC-Engine FAN	22.22/30

Award
Publication	Award
Gamest	Best Graphic 7th Best VGM 8th Annual Hit Game 31st

Märchen Maze, notably the PC Engine release, received mostly mixed reviews — while critics praised its graphics and controls, many would criticize its difficulty for drastically spiking up later on and for its unimpressive boss fights.

The May 1991 issue of German magazine Play Time praised the PC Engine version's "well matched" graphics and amount of action, although would criticize the difficulty for being too hard, namely in the first stage. They also disliked the game's sound effects, jokingly stating that the player would likely instead want to turn on their stereo instead of listening to them. In a retrospective review, Kurt Kalata of Hardcore Gaming 101 liked the game's cute visuals and controls, although stated the game "ran out of steam midway through" for its drastic rise in difficulty and mediocre boss fights.

Famitsu would dislike the PC Engine version's difficulty for being too drastic early on, although would praise its aesthetic and tight controls. PC Engine Fan magazine had a similar response, applauding its controls, visuals and soundtrack while disliking its uninteresting boss fights and high difficulty level, notably on the first stage of the game. Japanese magazine Gamest awarded the arcade version the 7th "Best Graphic" and 8th "Best VGM", as well as the 31st "Annual Hit Game" award in January 1998. They would go on to praise the game's faithfulness to the source material, saying that it was "superbly expressed".

In 1998, the Naniwa (the game's equivalents of Tweedledee and Tweedledum) went on to lend their name to one of the new stadiums (the Naniwa Dome), for the Namco System 12-era World Stadium games, but they did not appear in the Namco All Stars' lineup. In 2002, Alice was featured as a secret playable character in Family Tennis Advance. In 2005, Yujin released gashapon figures of Alice and Tokei Usagi (the game's equivalent of the White Rabbit) as part of their "Namco Girls" collection, even though the latter is male. The game's music is included in several of Namco compilation soundtracks.
