= Suzuka 8 Hours (video game) =

1992 video game

- Arcade flyer
- Developer: Namco
- Publisher: Namco
- Series: Suzuka 8 Hours
- Platforms: Arcade, Super Nintendo Entertainment System
- Release: Suzuka 8 Hours: JP: March 1992; NA: May 1992; Suzuka 8 Hours 2: JP: November 1993; NA/EU: 1994
- Genre: Racing
- Modes: Single-player, multiplayer
- Arcade system: Namco System 2

Coca-Cola: Suzuka 8 Hours (Note: Japanese: スズカエイトアワーズ, Hepburn: Suzuka Eito Awāzu) is a 1992 motorcycle racing arcade game developed and published by Namco. It is based on the homonymous real-world racing event. Players control a racer using a handlebar controller and must race against computer-controlled opponents while remaining in first place. It ran on the Namco System 2 arcade hardware. A direct sequel, Suzuka 8 Hours 2, was released a year later.

== Gameplay ==
Screenshot of the game

The game was made available in two-player cabinets featuring two monitors and two replica motorcycles; players accelerate their bikes by holding down the throttle grip and brake by using the brake lever, while steering is accomplished by physically leaning the bike left or right. The arcade game can be played by up to eight players simultaneously by linking four two-player cabinets together, and the players must complete an entire lap of the track within a preset time limit; upon completion of a lap, the time is extended for all players in the race. The first player to complete a preset number of laps (between 3 and 6 and adjustable by the arcade operator) wins the race; as in Final Lap and Dirt Fox (the latter of which was only released in Japan), if they manage to finish the race in less than a preset time, they have the opportunity to enter their initials upon the game's "best time" (as opposed to high score) table.

== Release ==
Suzuka 8 Hours was later ported to the SNES, in 1993 by Arc System Works; the game simulates the actual eight-hour race as eight "virtual hours", or over ninety "real-time" minutes. The object is to complete as many laps as possible before the time runs out; if it does, the timer starts going up again (as penalty time) and the next trip to the finish line ends the race.

== Reception ==
Reception

Review scores
Publication	Score
AllGame	3/5 (Arcade); 2.5/5 (SNES)
GamePro	4/5 (SNES)
Ação Games	4/4 (Arcade)

In Japan, Game Machine listed Suzuka 8 Hours as being the most popular arcade game of June 1992.

In the United States, RePlay reported the game to be the top-grossing new arcade video game in October 1992, and then the second most-popular deluxe arcade game in November 1992. It was one of America's top five best-selling arcade games of 1992, receiving the Gold Award at the American Amusement Machine Association (AAMA) trade show for sales excellence. It was later the top-grossing deluxe cabinet in January 1993, then the fourth top-grossing arcade game during Summer 1993, and then the top upright cabinet from September to October 1993.

In their review of the SNES version, GamePro criticized the absence of sound from CPU competitors' engines and the "distracting" music, but they praised the responsive controls and "sharp" graphics. In 1995, Flux magazine ranked the arcade version 54th on their Top 100 Video Games.
