= Finest Hour (video game) =

1989 Video game

- Arcade flyer
- Developer: Namco
- Publisher: Namco
- Composer: Katsuro Tajima
- Platform: Arcade
- Release: JP: September 1989
- Genre: Run and gun
- Modes: Single-player, multiplayer
- Arcade system: Namco System 2

Finest Hour (Note: Japanese: ファイネストアワー, Hepburn: Fainesuto Awā) is a 1989 run and gun video game developed and published by Namco for arcades. It was released only in Japan in September 1989. It was re-released on the Wii's Virtual Console on August 25, 2009. Hamster Corporation released the game outside Japan for the first time as part of their Arcade Archives series for the Nintendo Switch and PlayStation 4 in September 2023.

== Gameplay ==
In-game screenshot

The player must take control of a Transformer-like battlemech known as Sygnus, who is equipped with a laser cannon, Vernier jump-jets, auto-targeting, and an automatic cooling system. Pushing that joystick twice in the same direction will make Sygnus switch from a march to a dash while he is moving, and the player may not make him change the direction that he is facing in mid-air. He has no "life meter", just a temperature meter which increases when he is hit, and decreases when he is not hit - but, if the timer should run out, his cooling device will break. If he should overheat, the game will immediately be over. The game is made of four stages which must be finished twice.

== Reception ==
In Japan, Game Machine listed Finest Hour on their October 15, 1989 issue as being the eighth most-successful table arcade game of the year.
