= Blazer (video game) =

1987 video game

- Arcade flyer
- Developer: Namco
- Publisher: Namco
- Platform: Arcade
- Release: JP: July 1987
- Genre: Scrolling shooter
- Modes: Up to 2 players, alternating turns
- Arcade system: Namco System 1

Blazer (ブレイザー, Bureizā) is an isometric perspective scrolling shooter arcade video game released by Namco in 1987 in Japan. It runs on the company's System 1 hardware.

== Gameplay ==
The player must alternate between a tank named "Vanguard" and a helicopter named "Hardy" (and in the tenth and final mission, a hovercraft named "Atlanta"), to kill enemies both on land and in the air. Some air-based enemies will leave behind powerups for Vanguard to collect, when hit by its anti-aircraft missiles; they can restore its fuel, increase its fuel capacity, make it invulnerable for a short period of time, and even grant it an extra life if it manages to collect enough of them (which is initially thirteen, but it can go up to sixteen).

This game was dedicated to Shoko Tamako Sumie from all its staff; upon completion of the game, it gives a list of schematics for the player tank, and a passage from In The Cold Morning Of August.

== Reception ==
Reception

Review score
Publication	Score
Commodore User	6/10

In Japan, Game Machine listed Blazer on their September 1, 1987 issue as being the fifteenth most-successful table arcade unit of the month.
