= Yōkai Dochuki =

1987 video game

Yōkai Dōchūki
- Promotional flyer
- Developer: Namco
- Publisher: Namco
- Designer: Kazumi Mizuno
- Composer: Hiroyuki Kawada
- Platforms: Arcade, Family Computer, PC Engine, mobile phone
- Release: JP: April 1987; AS: 1987
- Genre: Platform
- Modes: Single-player, multiplayer

Yōkai Dōchūki (Note: Japanese: 妖怪道中記, Hepburn: Yōkai Dōchūki; Phantom Travel Journal) is a 1987 platform video game developed and published by Namco for arcades. It was released in Japan in April 1987 and other parts of Asia the same year.

The game was later ported to the PC Engine, and Family Computer consoles with several additions and different level design; the PC Engine version and the arcade version were both later re-released for the Wii's Virtual Console. Hamster Corporation released the game as part of their Arcade Archives series for the Nintendo Switch and PlayStation 4 in April 2022.

It was followed by a Japan-only spin-off in 1990 named Kyūkai Dōchūki, which is a "yakyū" (baseball) video game that plays similar to the entirety of Namco's own World Stadium series.

== Gameplay ==
Tarosuke jumping onto a cloud to avoid the enemies below.

In Yōkai Dōchūki, the player controls Tarosuke, a boy who was banished to "jigoku" for causing mischief in the world of the living. Tarosuke must venture through the monster-infested world of jigoku to reach Yama, the Buddhist deity that judges the dead, who determines his final fate. The game is divided into five levels, each taking place in specific regions of jigoku, such as "Jigoku Iriguchi" (The Gateway to Hell) and "Yuukai" (The Ghost Sea). Tarosuke must reach the end of these levels while defeating enemies and jumping onto platforms. He can defeat enemies by shooting small "ki" bullets; these can be charged to increase their power by holding down on the joystick or directional pad. Enemies drop bags of money when killed, which is used to purchase useful items at stores. Tarosuke has a life bar that depletes when he is inflicted with damage; the game ends when the meter is empty.

The first four stages conclude in a boss fight with an oni that guards the entrance to the next stage. At the beginning of these, Tarosuke kneels at a shrine and summons a spirit named Monmotaro to defeat the oni. The player controls Monmotaro in these fights, being able to fly around and shoot powerful energy pellets. The game increases in difficulty as Tarosuke progresses, with some levels requiring him to find three secret items in order to unlock the way to the next area and search for hidden pathways. The amount of money collected and enemies killed in the final level determines which of five endings the player receives, with the best showing Tarosuke traveling to heaven, and the worst ending showing Tarosuke sent back to Hell. The Family Computer version of the game adds a "pious" meter, which is filled when Tarosuke performs good deeds such as complete specific objectives in some levels. The pious meter also helps to determine the ending received at the end of the game.

== Reception ==
Reception

Review scores
Publication	Score
Famitsu	30/40 (FC)
Family Computer Magazine	21.41/30
Power Play	64%

Awards
Publication	Award
Gamest	8th Grand Prize, 4th Best Ending Award, 8th Best Graphic
Famitsu	Silver Hall of Fame (FC)

Game Machine reported that Yōkai Dōchūki was the most-popular arcade game in the month of April 1987. It went on to be the fifth highest-grossing table arcade game of 1987 in Japan.

== Legacy ==
Tarosuke also appears as a playable character in the Japan-only role-playing PlayStation 2 game Namco X Capcom, where he is teamed up with Taira no Kagekiyo from Genpei Tōma Den. He also makes a cameo appearance in Project X Zone 2 for the Nintendo 3DS.
