= Mach Breakers =

1995 video game

- Arcade flyer
- Developer: Namco
- Publisher: Namco
- Composers: Hiroto Sasaki; Nobuyoshi Sano
- Platform: Arcade
- Release: JP: February 1995
- Genre: Sports
- Modes: Single-player, multiplayer
- Arcade system: Namco NB-2

Mach Breakers (Note: Japanese: マッハブレイカーズ, Hepburn: Mahha Bureikāzu) is a 1995 sports video game developed and published by Namco for arcades. It was released in Japan in February 1995. It is the sequel to Numan Athletics, released in 1993 two years prior.

Hamster Corporation released the game as part of their Arcade Archives series for the Nintendo Switch and PlayStation 4, as well as their Arcade Archives 2 series for the Nintendo Switch 2, PlayStation 5 and Xbox Series X/S in September 2025.

== Gameplay ==
The players must take control of up to seven new (and selectable) Numans with different speed and power levels, who must compete in a competition consisting of various absurd variations of sports. The competition takes place over five days, and on the second, third and fourth ones, there are three (four on the third day) different events that must be qualified for. If any player fails to qualify for an event on these days, they lose and will have to insert another coin and continuing in order to try again. Each of the Numans has their own unique ending sequence (much like the four lords from Exvania), which means a player will have to finish the game with all seven of them to see them all.

The starter lights on the "Hyper Glider" event also look like Pac-Man, and a picture of him also appears on the side of a passing airship (along with Prince Gilgamesh and Princess Ki from The Tower of Druaga, Momo Kanda from Wonder Momo, Valkyrie from Valkyrie no Densetsu, Hiromi Tengenji from Burning Force, and Pitt and Patti from Tinkle Pit), while Miyuki Chan (from Ordyne) can get seen running a "Prince Paco" (from Marvel Land) taco stand, and the Dig Dug characters can be seen in the "Ground Spike" event as the crack a Numan makes in the ground goes deeper.

== Reception ==
In Japan, Game Machine listed Mach Breakers on their April 1, 1995 issue as being the ninth most-successful arcade game of the month.
