= Star Wars Battle Pod =

2014 video game

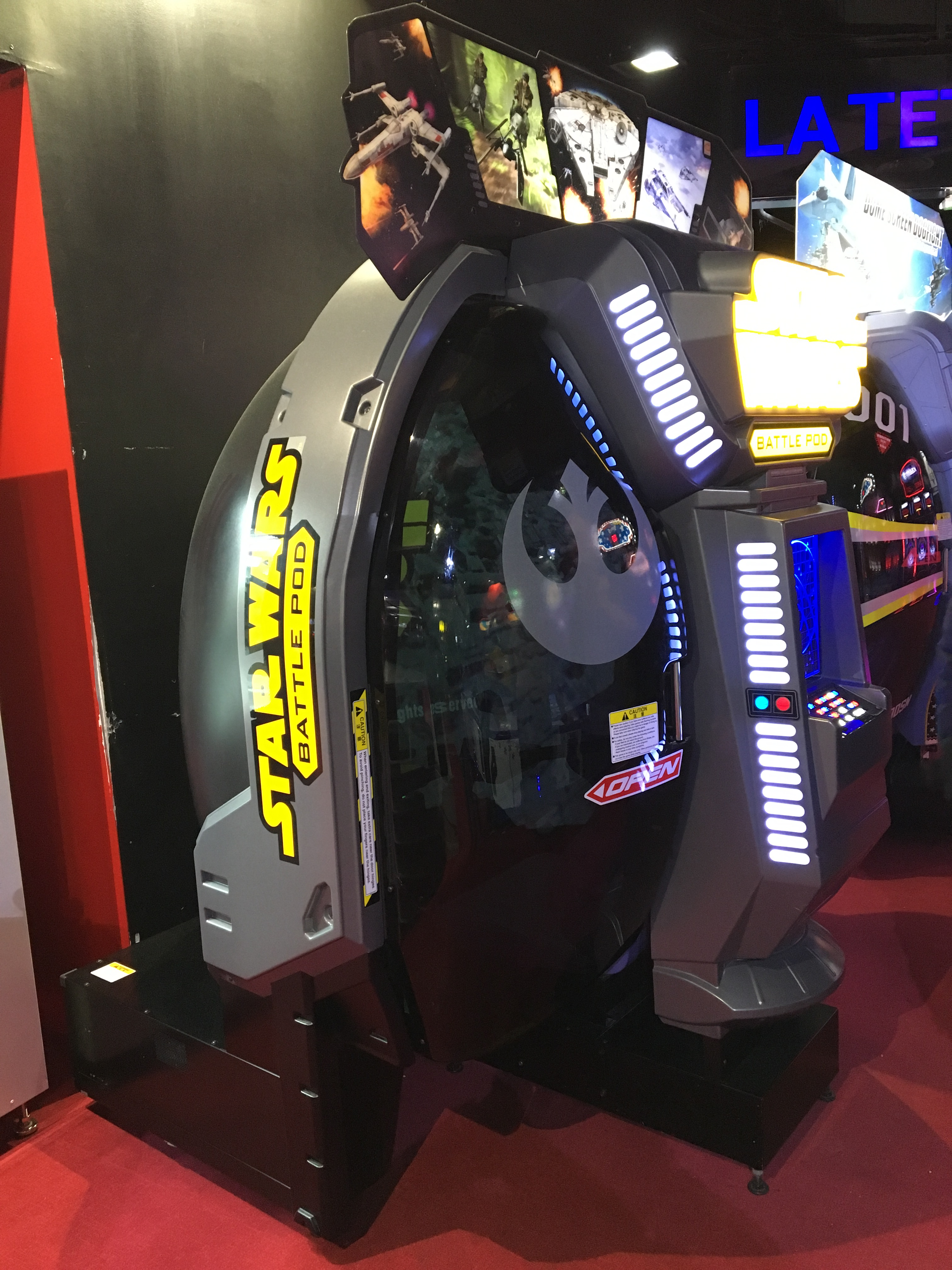
- Cabinet in Paris, France
- Developer: Bandai Namco Games
- Publisher: Bandai Namco Games
- Producer: Kazushi Imoto
- Series: Star Wars
- Engine: Unreal Engine 3
- Platform: Arcade
- Release: October 8, 2014
- Genre: Rail shooter
- Modes: Single-player, multiplayer
- Arcade system: System ES3

Star Wars Battle Pod is a 2014 rail shooter video game developed and published by Bandai Namco Games for arcades. Based on the Star Wars franchise, it was unveiled at New York Comic Con on October 8, 2014.

== Gameplay ==
The game consists of multiple scenarios that correspond with major battles in the original trilogy. There are six scenarios:

- The Battle of Yavin (Yavin) from Star Wars where the player is placed in an X-wing attacking the Death Star to prevent it from destroying Yavin 4.
- The Battle of Hoth (Hoth) from The Empire Strikes Back where the player pilots a snowspeeder to assist in the evacuation of Hoth from invading Imperial forces.
- A speeder run through Endor (Endor) where the player helps Han Solo make it to the shield generator to destroy the Death Star's shield for the Rebels in space.
- The Battle of Endor (Death Star II) from Return of the Jedi, which places the player in the cockpit of the Millennium Falcon to try to destroy the Death Star II and end the war.
- There is one mission that does not follow the storyline of the movies but sets its own path (Vader's Revenge). It takes place immediately after the destruction of the first Death Star at Yavin where the player plays as Darth Vader who is trying to prevent the Rebels from salvaging the still-functional core of the Death Star's superlaser with the ability to eliminate Han Solo in the process.
- Another version of the game adds a scene from The Force Awakens, where the player pilots a T-70 X-wing against First Order ships on Takodana to protect General Leia's transport.

The arcade cabinet comes in two versions: the environmental version with the dome screen, and a smaller version, but still sit-down, with a flat screen TV.

== See also ==
- Star Wars Trilogy Arcade
- Star Wars: Racer Arcade
- Mach Storm
- Mobile Suit Gundam: Bonds of the Battlefield
