= Ace Driver: Victory Lap =

1995 video game

- Developer: Namco
- Publisher: Namco
- Platform: Arcade
- Release: NA: December 1995; JP: March 1996
- Genre: Racing
- Modes: Single-player, multiplayer
- Arcade system: Namco System 22

Ace Driver: Victory Lap (Note: Japanese: エースドライバー・ビクトリーラップ, Hepburn: Ēsu Doraibā Bikutorī Rappu) is a 1995 racing video game developed and published by Namco for arcades. It was released in North America in December 1995 and in Japan in March 1996.

Hamster Corporation released the arcade version as part of their Arcade Archives series for the Nintendo Switch and PlayStation 4, as well as their Arcade Archives 2 series for the Nintendo Switch 2, PlayStation 5 and Xbox Series X/S in October 2026.

== Gameplay ==
The game features roughly similar gameplay to its predecessor. It features two additional tracks and more vehicles, alongside a new "Championship" gameplay mode that allows the player to race on all three tracks consecutively.
