= Tenkomori Shooting =

1998 video game

- Title screen
- Developer: Namco
- Publisher: Namco
- Platform: Arcade
- Release: 1998
- Genre: Shoot 'em up
- Modes: Single-player, Multiplayer

Tenkomori Shooting (てんこもりシューティング) is a 1998 shoot 'em up arcade video game developed and published in Japan by Namco.

== Gameplay ==
With Tenkomori Shooting, Namco takes the formula of Point Blank and applies it to the shoot 'em up genre. The game, which can be played by one or two players, draws inspiration from the greatest moments of classic games in the genre, such as Xevious, Galaga, Tiger-Heli, Pang, 1942, Missile Command, Panzer Dragoon, Star Soldier, and R-Type. The interface consists of a joystick and a button, with the screen oriented vertically. The player controls a monkey whose goal is to reach the top of a tower made up of four, six, or nine floors (depending on the selected difficulty level). On each floor, the player must complete a shooting mini-game among the 26 available. The player has a limited time to complete each mission. If successful, they move to the next floor. If they fail, they lose a life. If they lose all their lives, the game is over. Enemies cannot kill the player, but each hit causes the player to lose time. Each mini-game has its own atmosphere and rules. These mini-games include eradicating as many enemies as possible while avoiding other targets, defeating a boss as quickly as possible, squashing all the cockroaches, sending hearts to a singer performing on stage, shooting down UFOs with rockets, and more. If the player performs well, they can unlock bonus stages, one of which is inspired by Time Crisis. The environments are varied, ranging from battlefields to bathrooms, a room filled with ninjas, a sushi restaurant, and more.

== Reception ==
Tenkomori Shooting had a rather positive reception. According to Consoles +, "the programmers have produced something very fun. [...] This nice game is certainly not a revolution, but it will provide good moments for two players." Player One concurred: "the single player mode is already fun, thanks to the variety of challenges and the potential high score chase. Obviously, it really shines in two-player mode," and "all this in varied environments." Retro Gamer said that "it's a fun game design [and] you'll find that the presentation adds a lot to the game. The notable settings actually extend well beyond the comedic and into self-referential territory too". They added that it's "one of those games that really flies under the radar, and deserves to be played by a wider audience. The fact that it never got a home conversion [on the PlayStation] is a shame."
