= Kidō Senshi Gundam: Senjō no Kizuna =

2006 video game

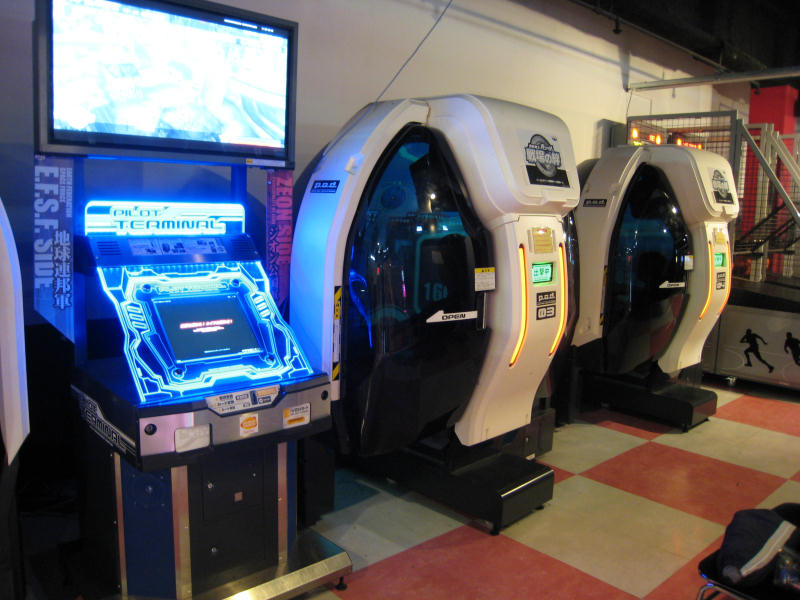
- Two PODs at center and right, on the left is a 'Terminal' for the game
- Developers: Banpresto; Namco Bandai Games
- Publisher: Namco Bandai Games
- Series: Gundam
- Platforms: Arcade, PlayStation Portable
- Release: Arcade: JP: 7 November 2006; REV.1.00 7 November 2006; REV.2.00 8 December 2008; REV.3.00 29 July 2011; REV.4.00 21 December 2016 PlayStation Portable: JP: 26 March 2009
- Genre: First-person shooter
- Mode: Multiplayer
- Arcade system: Namco System N2

Kidō Senshi Gundam: Senjō no Kizuna (機動戦士ガンダム 戦場の絆, lit. Mobile Suit Gundam: Bonds of the Battlefield), is a Japanese arcade game set in the original Gundam universe (Mobile Suit Gundam). The game was created by Bandai Namco and Banpresto and was released late 2006. Play involves stepping into a P.O.D. (Panoramic Optical Display) and doing battle with other players across Japan.

== Overview ==
The game was launched in Japan on 7 November 2006 with arcades usually equipped with four pods (some amusement centers have more). Battles are held online across Japan against other players from opposing factions (全国対戦).

In this game, players become pilots of giant robot mobile suits from the anime series. Pilots play through two battle scenarios lasting a total game time of ten minutes. The POD has a dome screen powered by a DLP projector. Pilot cards are purchased at the game's pilot terminal. A large monitor replays the last battle and an angled touch screen user interface is used to manage pilot battle data.

== Overseas release ==
The Hong Kong launch of the game (at Rev. 1.01) was on 19 April 2008 at Causeway Bay's Wonder Park Plus. As of spring 2009 the cabinets are available in five more arcades in Hong Kong, and had been featured during the C3 HK exhibition in April. Machines at all three locations are at Rev. 1.01 and the linked play between all three arcades are possible, though the version difference prevents any overseas arcades to be compatible with the Japanese version.

Users accessing the official websites are recommended to access the Hong Kong website for the Cantonese and English translations, and the Japanese website for the Japanese release.

The game was introduced to Taiwan on 28 July 2009, with 8 pods in Chung-Li and eight in Taichung. Later on, in November, additional 4POD sets were added in Taipei and Shin-Chu.

== PlayStation Portable port ==
A port of Senjō no Kizuna, entitled Kidō Senshi Gundam: Senjō no Kizuna Portable was made available for the PlayStation Portable on 26 March 2009. It was developed by Access Games and published by Bandai Namco. The main director at Bandai Namco Games was Hisaharu Tago, who was a main director of the arcade version, REV1.00 and at Access Games, it was directed by SWERY.

== Legacy ==
Namco later used the POD concept for three other games: Mach Storm, Star Wars Battle Pod, and Lost Land Adventure. Unlike this game, these games made it to North America.

A sequel named Kidō Senshi Gundam: Senjō no Kizuna II (機動戦士ガンダム 戦場の絆II, lit. Mobile Suit Gundam: Bonds of the Battlefield II was announced in 2020, featuring a new cabinet that uses three separate displays instead of a dome screen, and an open-air design.
