= Emeraldia =

1993 video game

- Japanese arcade flyer
- Developer: Namco
- Publisher: Namco
- Designer: Kohji Kenjoh
- Composer: Yoshie Arakawa
- Platform: Arcade
- Release: JP: July 1993
- Genre: Puzzle
- Modes: Single-player, multiplayer
- Arcade system: Namco NA-1, Namco NA-2

Emeraldia (Note: Japanese: エメラルディア, Hepburn: Emerarudia) is a 1993 puzzle video game developed and published by Namco for arcades. It was only released in Japan in July 1993. A port for mobile phones was released in 2006. It was re-released on the Wii's Virtual Console in March 2009. Hamster Corporation released the game outside Japan for the first time as part of the Arcade Archives series for the Nintendo Switch and PlayStation 4 in April 2024.

== Gameplay ==
Arcade version screenshot

The game features three modes of play: "Adventure", "Normal", and "Versus". In all three modes, both players must line up blocks of a particular color - and when three blocks have been lined up (vertically), they will crack. Once a fourth block of that same color lands on the three cracked ones, they will all shatter. As for Adventure Mode, the object is to get the trapped sea creatures down to the bottom of the screen and rescue them. After each ocean has been cleared, the player receives an item which can be activated by pushing the stick up and pressing the button, but each item can only be used once, and only in the ocean that follows the one it was received at the end of. At the end of the "Mystic Ocean", the player must defeat a sea demon named Jamir, by cracking the block he is possessing with his face; he will then go on to possess a different block, and once the blocks he possesses have been cracked six times, he will be defeated. However, the game is not over at this point, as there is still one more stage that has to be cleared (called the "Escape Stage"), where the player must get seven pink dolphins and one blue one (which appear as part of the block groups) down to the bottom of the screen.

== Reception ==
Reception

Review score
Publication	Score
AllGame	3/5

In Japan, Game Machine listed Emeraldia as the eighth most popular table arcade game of August 1993.
