= Final Furlong =

1997 video game

- European flyer
- Developer: Namco
- Publisher: Namco
- Platform: Arcade
- Release: 1997
- Genre: Racing
- Modes: Single-player, multiplayer
- Arcade system: Namco Gorgon

Final Furlong is a horse racing video game developed by Namco and released in arcades in 1997. The game is one of only two known games to run on Namco System 22.5 Gorgon hardware, an early revision of the Namco System 23 hardware.

== Gameplay ==
There are three tracks to choose from: 6 1/2 furlongs, 1 mile and 1 1/2 miles. Horses are classified according to where their best pace is: Leader (maintains highest speed when in first place), Front Runner (best pace is between second and fourth), Mid-Runner (best pace is when between fifth and seventh place), Strong Finisher (who is fastest at the end of the race), and two Almighty Runners (who keep their pace in any position).

Players sit in a "saddle" and must then rock the cabinet's horses back and forth, to urge their horses forward, pressing the "Whip" button to speed them up and pulling on "reins" to keep the horse from colliding with the fences or other horses.

== Reception ==
In Japan, Game Machine listed Final Furlong as the top dedicated arcade video game in its September 15, 1997, and November 1, 1997, issues. Gerald Lynch, writing for TechRadar, placed it among a list of "The 50 best arcade games of all time, ever," saying "This machine was brutal - popping you astride a giant plastic horse, you’d propel yourself forward by “geeing up” your steed, rocking manically forwards and backwards to speed the beast up. Best played with two players, the marathon-like events would last so long you wouldn't be able to walk for a week."

Final Furlong was listed in the book 1001 Video Games You Must Play Before You Die.
