= Dangerous Seed =

1989 video game

- Japanese arcade flyer
- Developer: Namco
- Publisher: Namco
- Designer: Yuichiro Shinozaki
- Composer: Yoshinori Nagumo
- Platforms: Arcade, Sega Mega Drive
- Release: JP: December 1989; Mega Drive: JP: December 18, 1990
- Genre: Scrolling shooter
- Modes: Single-player, multiplayer
- Arcade system: Namco System 1

Dangerous Seed (Note: Japanese: デンジャラスシード, Hepburn: Denjarasu Shīdo) is a 1989 vertically scrolling shooter video game developed and published by Namco for arcades. Controlling one of three different starships, the player is tasked with destroying an alien race known as the Danger Seed before they wipe out all of mankind. Each ship has their own set of weapons and abilities, such as shots that dissolve enemies and target-seeking projectiles, and can sustain multiple hits before being destroyed. The player's ships can also combine into a new ship, the Moon Diver, featuring a stronger shield and additional weapons.

The game was designed by Yuichiro Shinozaki, a character artist for Namco's own Babylonian Castle Saga franchise, with music composed by Yoshinori Nagumo. Early versions of the game were known as Kristallkern, which remains in-game during the end credits. A conversion for the Sega Mega Drive was released a year later in 1990, which included new features such as additional stages and an arranged soundtrack.

Dangerous Seed was met with mixed reviews from critics — although the game was praised for its graphics, fast-paced gameplay and soundtrack, it was criticized for lacking originality and for being unable to stand out among other similar games.

== Gameplay ==
Arcade version screenshot

Dangerous Seed is a vertically scrolling shooter video game. The player controls a fleet of ships — Alpha, Beta and Gamma — as they must wipe out the alien race known as Danger Seed before they destroy all of mankind. Each ship features different attack types; Alpha has a standard shot, Beta has a V-shaped laser weapon, and Gamma has the ability to shoot forwards and backwards. All three also have a health meter that will deplete when they are inflicted with enemy fire, and having one of the ships destroyed will cause the player to take control of the next ship. If all three ships are destroyed, the game will be over. The three ships can also find power capsules by destroying large "Turtle" enemies that upgrade their abilities, such as homing missiles, "ring lasers" that track enemies, and a melt-missile that dissolves enemies when they are hit.

The game spans twelve stages, known as "tubes" in-game, each taking place in planets found in the Solar System. The fifth tube combines the player's ships into a single craft named the Moon Diver, which features all of the weapons and abilities of the three ships and a large health bar. Each tube features a boss fight at the end, which must be destroyed in a certain amount of time before it flees and deducts points from the player's score. Bosses have weak points which must be destroyed before completely defeating it.

== Development ==
Dangerous Seed was released by Namco for arcades only in Japan in December 1989. It was designed by Yuichiro Shinozaki, who was a character designer for the Babylonian Castle Saga franchise. The game was originally known as Kristallkern in early prototypes, with the end credits still retaining this name — the credits also hint at a follow-up with a vague "To be continued" message, but a sequel was never released. The soundtrack was composed by Yoshinori Nagumo, which was re-released by Victor Entertainment in 1990. A Sega Mega Drive conversion was released exclusively in Japan on December 18, 1990, adding new features such as additional stages and an arranged soundtrack.

== Reception ==
Reception

Review scores
Publication	Score
Computer and Video Games	50%
Famitsu	6/10, 7/10, 7/10, 6/10
Génération 4	70%
Aktueller Software Markt	9.6/12
Raze	68%
Power Play	63%

Award
Publication	Award
Gamest	37th Annual Hit Game

In Japan, Game Machine listed Dangerous Seed as the seventeenth most successful table arcade game of 1989. The Mega Drive version in particular was met with mixed reviews, being praised for its colorful graphics, fast-paced gameplay and soundtrack, but criticized for its lack of originality and being unable to stand out among other shooters in the market.

Japanese publication Famitsu liked the game's fast-paced gameplay, colorful graphics and soundtrack, while German magazine Aktueller Software Markt (ASM) praised its detailed graphics and intense gameplay, labeling it was one of the best shooting games released for the Mega Drive. ASM also liked the game's soundtrack and large, impressive boss fights. Power Play applauded the game's level of suspense and vibrant graphics, alongside its unique enemy designs and power-up items. Super Gaming magazine was the most positive towards the game, who praised its graphics, boss fights, power-up items and "sonic-filled" gameplay, saying it was one of the most unique shooters available. In their brief review, Raze liked the game's later background designs and fast-paced action. French publication Génération 4 praised the game's "beautiful" graphics, energetic music and realistic sound effects. Japanese magazine Gamest awarded the arcade version the "37th Annual Hit Game" award, praising its intense action and detailed graphics.

Raze criticized the game for being frustrating to play, as well as disliking many of the game's earlier backgrounds for being unappealing and ugly, while Famitsu stated that the game lacked originality and had a difficult time standing out among other similar games of its genre. Raze also disliked the game's graphics for blending into the background, making it difficult to decipher enemy projectiles and the player's ship. In contrast to Famitsu's review, Computer + Video Games magazine thought that the game was too easy, saying that only "extremely inexperienced" gamers would find the game to be a challenge. They also found the power-up items to be "nothing new" and disliked its gameplay for being tedious and uninteresting. Power Play soured towards the gameplay for not adding anything particularly new to the genre, saying that it only stuck to the bare basic mechanics established in previous vertically scrolling shooters.
