= Rapid River (video game) =

1997 video game

- Developer: Namco
- Publisher: Namco
- Platform: Arcade
- Release: NA: November 1997; JP: December 1997
- Genre: Boating
- Arcade system: Namco Gorgon

Rapid River (Note: Japanese: ラピッドリバー, Hepburn: Rapiddo Ribā) is a 1997 arcade game released by Namco. The game is about white water rafting, and players must race against the clock, passing through checkpoints to extend the time they have to complete the level. The game is notable for its unique player controls that aim to replicate oars. It was intended to appeal to dating couples. The game is one of only two known games to run on Namco Gorgon hardware, an early revision of the Namco System 23 hardware. A virtual reality remake was released by Bandai Namco Amusement in 2018 for its VR Zone arcade centers.

== Gameplay ==
The cabinet includes a pneumatic system that jolts the raft seat whenever the player(s) collide into rocks and/or crash into big swells and a 50-inch screen. The raft seat accommodates up to two players who can act as a team to combine their strength and paddle away from hungry dinosaurs, deadly whirlpools and so on. Several branches or forks in the river allow players to choose their own course through the game and navigate to different areas. This aims to provide similar non-linear gameplay popularised by titles such as Sega's Outrun. There total 6 different themed areas of gameplay, including Dinosaur Land (with a T-Rex chasing the player's boat), Evening Along the Nile, and The Big Canyon. If players successfully reach one of three different endings in time, they are given a special bonus stage.

== Reception ==
Reception

Review scores
Publication	Score
AllGame	3.5/5
Player One	91%
Video Games	3/5

Rapid River was well received upon release as one of Namco's major titles at the 35th Japan Amusement Expo in Tokyo. Edge magazine called it "one of the most entertaining games of the show", and Sega Saturn Magazine dubbed it "the game everyone was talking about", stating "incredible effects and amusing graphics ensured it's [sic] popularity". Computer and Video Games named it as the biggest game at the show for Namco. In Japan, Game Machine listed Rapid River on their January 1, 1998 issue as being the most-popular dedicated arcade game at the time.
