= Armadillo Racing =

1997 video game

- Developer: Namco
- Publisher: Namco
- Platform: Arcade
- Release: NA: April 1997; JP: May 1997
- Genre: Racing
- Modes: Single-player, multiplayer
- Arcade system: Namco System 22

Armadillo Racing (Note: Japanese: アルマジロレーシング, Hepburn: Arumajiro Rēshingu) is a 1997 racing video game developed and published by Namco for arcades. It was released in North America in April 1997 and in Japan in May 1997. It is the last game to use the Namco System 22 hardware.

Hamster Corporation released the game as part of their Arcade Archives series for the Nintendo Switch and PlayStation 4, as well as their Arcade Archives 2 series for the Nintendo Switch 2, PlayStation 5 and Xbox Series X/S in July 2026. The game gained attention for its bizarre premise and trackball controls, unique for a racing game of its kind.

== Gameplay ==
Players use a trackball to control an armadillo who races against other armadillos and another player in races. The armadillo must roll to navigate through obstacles while trying to maintain speed. If the player rolls too fast, the armadillo suffers a heart attack which slows the player's progress. If the player wins the game, a minigame where the armadillo is used as a bowling ball is available to gain extra points before the game ends.
