= Driver's Eyes =

1991 video game

- Developer: Namco
- Publisher: Namco
- Platform: Arcade
- Release: February 1991
- Genre: Driving simulator
- Mode: Single-player
- Arcade system: Namco System 21

Driver's Eyes (Note: Japanese: ドライバーズアイ, Hepburn: Doraibāzu Ai) is a 1991 3D driving simulation arcade game developed and published in Japan by Namco. The game has a pseudo-panoramic view using three CRT screens; the player sat in a then-realistic Formula One car cockpit with LCD instruments. The game started with the player selecting either "easy drive" or "technical drive". Once the selection was made the screen would show a 3D model of a Formula One car with a V8 engine being placed into the engine bay and then the body work gliding down. As that happened the camera view would change and reveal a sign saying "BRAKES ON". When the sign lifted the race would start.

Gameplay screenshot

== Reception ==
In Japan, Game Machine listed Driver's Eyes on their May 1, 1991 issue as being the second most-successful upright/cockpit arcade game of the month.
