= Motocross Go! =

1997 arcade game

- Developer: Namco
- Publisher: Namco
- Platform: Arcade
- Release: JP: October 30, 1997; WW: 1998:
- Genre: Racing

Motocross Go! is an arcade video game developed and published by Namco in 1997 in Japan and 1998 worldwide.

== Gameplay ==
Motocross Go! is a dirt bike racing game for one player.

== Reception ==
Next Generation reviewed the arcade version of the game, rating it two stars out of five, and stated that "Motocross Go! is sure to fade like the expensive, forgettable set of jet ski units that most frugal arcade operators skipped without ever blinking."
