= Aqua Jet =

1996 video game

- Arcade flyer
- Developer: Namco
- Publisher: Namco
- Platform: Arcade
- Release: JP: September 1996; NA: October 1996
- Genre: Racing
- Mode: Single-player
- Arcade system: Namco System 22

Aqua Jet (Note: Japanese: アクアジェット, Hepburn: Akua Jetto) is a 1996 racing video game developed and published by Namco for arcades. It was released in Japan in September 1996 and in North America in October 1996. Hamster Corporation released the game as part of their Arcade Archives series for the Nintendo Switch and PlayStation 4, as well as the Arcade Archives 2 series for the Nintendo Switch 2, PlayStation 5 and Xbox Series X/S in August 2025.

== Gameplay ==
The player rides a jet ski throughout a water course, aiming to reach the first by navigating the level and surpassing enemies within a strict time limit, similar to Namco's Ridge Racer (1993). The time limit can be extended by running into checkpoints on time. Obstacles such as choppy water and ramps to jump on are available. Only one track is available, with an advanced version to be unlocked, though a mirrored version and a mirrored version of the advanced version are available through cheats. The player can play as a penguin through cheats.

== Reception ==
Ken Talbot of Nintendo Life gave the Nintendo Switch 2 version a 6/10 score, praising its gameplay, though he criticized its severe lack of content.
