= Starsweep =

1997 video game

- Japanese arcade flyer
- Developer: Axela
- Publishers: JP: Namco/Axela; NA: Agetec; EU: Midas Interactive Entertainment
- Platforms: Arcade, PlayStation, Game Boy
- Release: Arcade: JP: 1997; Game Boy: JP: December 19, 1997; PlayStation: JP: October 30, 1997; EU: September 25, 2000; NA: January 31, 2001
- Genre: Puzzle
- Modes: Single-player, multiplayer
- Arcade system: Namco System 11

Starsweep is a puzzle video game by Japanese developer Axela, released in 1997 in Japanese arcades and for the PlayStation, and in 1998 for the Game Boy. The gameplay is similar to that of the Puzzle League series, but with more traditional Tetris-like gameplay where pieces fall from the top of the screen.

Pieces come in three colors: red, yellow, and blue. Pieces commonly have a star on one end, or occasionally, a star on two ends. The aim of the game is to clear blocks from the playing field, by matching stars from same-coloured blocks. Players are rewarded for creating combos (which are called 'links') of piece clearances. The game ends when someone's piece level reaches the top of the playfield and is not cleared after three seconds.

The one player 'story' mode revolves around moving around an island and playing against opponents who gradually become harder, and consists of playing against 9 opponents (although this can be adjusted). There are also activities that involve the player concentrating on a specific task within a time limit. These include getting a high score, a high number of links, surviving for as long as possible, and clearing a field in a short time.

== Reception ==
In Japan, Game Machine listed Starsweep on their November 1, 1997 issue as being the twenty-second most-successful arcade game of the month.

Writing in Official PlayStation Magazine Andy Lowe awarded the title a score of 7/10, describing it as "an extra-psychedelic Tetris" and "surprisingly addictive, with plenty of game modes and some inventive mini-challenges".
