= Dirt Dash =

1995 video game

- Developer: Namco
- Publisher: Namco
- Platform: Arcade
- Release: 1995
- Genre: Racing
- Mode: Single-player
- Arcade system: Namco System 22

Dirt Dash (Note: Japanese: ダート ダッシュ, Hepburn: Dāto Dasshu) is a 1995 off-road racing arcade game developed and published by Namco.

== Gameplay ==
Dirt Dash is a racing game featuring off-road terrain.

== Reception ==
Reception

Review score
Publication	Score
Next Generation	4/5

In Japan, Game Machine listed Dirt Dash on their February 15, 1996 issue as being the third most-successful dedicated arcade game of the month. Next Generation reviewed the arcade version of the game, rating it four stars out of five, and stated that "Essentially, Dirt Dash is to Sega Rally what Tekken is to Virtua Fighter, and with its attractive use of the Super System 22 board, light-sourcing and backgrounds, plus the excellent feel of the cars themselves, Namco has another hit on its hands."
