= Ace Driver =

1994 video game

- North American arcade flyer
- Developer: Namco
- Publisher: Namco
- Composer: Hiroyuki Kawada
- Series: Ace Driver
- Platform: Arcade
- Release: JP: August 6, 1994; WW: March 1995
- Genre: Racing
- Modes: Single-player, multiplayer
- Arcade system: Namco System 22

Ace Driver (Note: Japanese: エースドライバー, Hepburn: Ēsu Doraibā) is a 1994 racing video game developed and published by Namco for arcades. The player controls a Formula One racer, with the objective being to complete three laps of a race course and to avoid a collision with opponents and other obstacles. Three difficulty levels are available, as is a mode to enable a gear shift. Similar to Namco's own Final Lap series, the arcade cabinet can be linked together with another unit to enable eight-person multiplayer. It ran on the Namco System 22 arcade hardware.

Ace Driver was designed by Tatsuro Okamoto, his known for his work on the classic arcade game Metro-Cross (1985). He was assisted by Pole Position designer Shinichiro Okamoto. The game was a widespread success, winning the "Best Coin-Operated Game" award at the 76th Annual IAAPA tradeshow in November 1994. Critics praised the game's realistic graphics, multiplayer and responsive controls, with some reviewers finding it to be superior than Sega's Daytona USA and Namco's own Ridge Racer. It was followed by two sequels, Ace Driver: Victory Lap (1995) and Ace Driver 3: Final Turn (2008). A PlayStation port was announced in 1995 but not released.

== Gameplay ==
In-game screenshot

Ace Driver is a 3D racing video game. Gameplay involves the player controlling a Formula One racer, the objective being to complete three laps of a race while in first place. The player can choose one of eight playable vehicles, which is determined by which seat the player has chosen on the cabinet itself. Cars also carry advertisements featuring names of older Namco video games and products, in a manner similar to the Ridge Racer series. The player can also choose from three difficulty levels — Beginner, Expert, and Expert Pro Race Class. Namco produced two versions of the game, an SD model and a DX model. The SD version features a basic sit-down structure, while the DX version features seats that rotate based on the player's actions in the game. Both cabinets are linkable, and allow for an additional machine to be connected to it, which enables eight-person multiplayer.

== Development and release ==
Ace Driver was released in Japan with a limited release on 6 August 1994, and then a nationwide release in November 1994. It was followed by a North American release later that year, and it then released in Europe in March 1995. The game was designed by Tatsuro Okamoto, known for his work on Metro-Cross and the Final Lap series, with assistance from Pole Position designer Shinichiro Okamoto. The arcade cabinet, designed by mechanical engineer Junichiro Koyama, is much heavier than Namco's other arcade cabinets, which made it difficult for the game to be easily shipped. The game ran on the Namco System 22 hardware, which was also used for the original Ridge Racer, with speaker systems provided by American company BOSE. Care was taken during production of the game's controls so as to make them tight and easy to use, which Okamoto recalls being as responsive as moving a shopping cart. The DX version, which featured rotating seats, was stated to have been dangerous in the event cabinet was placed up against the wall, leading to small fences being placed towards the base of the cabinet.

== Reception ==
Reception

Review score
Publication	Score
Next Generation	4/5

Award
Publication	Award
International Association of Amusement Parks and Attractions (IAAPA)	Best Coin-Operated Game, Most Innovative Coin-Op Game

Ace Driver was a widespread success, with reviewers praising its impressive technological capabilities and realistic graphics. At the 76th Annual International Association of Amusement Parks and Attractions (IAAPA) tradeshow in November 1994, it was awarded the "Best Coin-Operated Game" award, for its texture-mapped 3D graphics, force feedback and motion-based cabinet. It also received a product innovation award from the IAAPA.

The game was also a commercial success, with Namco reporting an "overwhelming" number of orders placed for the eight-player version. In Japan, Game Machine listed it on their January 1, 1995 issue as being the second most-successful dedicated arcade game of the month. It went on to be the third highest-grossing dedicated arcade game of 1995 in Japan.

Edge magazine was impressed with the game's eight-person multiplayer and technological capabilities, saying that it easily outperformed Sega's Daytona USA, which they attributed to the Namco System 22 arcade operating hardware it ran on. Edge also praised the game's usage of Gouraud shading techniques for giving it a realistic look at feel, concluding that Ace Driver helps justify Namco's reputation for producing impressive technology.

In their debut issue, Next Generation liked the game's unique "side-by-side" movement, saying that it created a much more realistic sense of turning and gave the game more of an "edge" compared to Namco's other driving game, Ridge Racer 2. They concluded their review by saying: "It may not be the best all-around racing title out today, but for competitive multi-player action, Ace Driver holds the title". Spanish publication Hobby Hitech found the game superior to both Daytona USA and Sega Rally, showing a positive response towards the game's controls and realistic graphics. They also considered the game a true successor to Ridge Racer, highlighting its presentation and sense of speed. In a 2012 retrospect, Kotaku was more negative towards the game for its "atrocious" menu system and poor collision detection, while also disliking its rubber banding mechanic for making the game unfair to more experienced players. Despite their criticism, they said that its broken mechanics "made the game a blast" to play.

== Sequels and legacy ==
A sequel, Ace Driver: Victory Lap, was released in 1995 for arcades, featuring additional tracks and vehicles, alongside a new "Championship" gameplay mode. Victory Lap was first released in Japan on 29 September, and in North America in December. It was released as part of the Arcade Archives and Arcade Archives 2 series by Hamster Corporation in October 2026.

A second sequel, Ace Driver 3: Final Turn, was first presented at the Spring Amusement Operator's Union (AOU) tradeshow in 2008, before being released later that year. A port of Ace Driver for the PlayStation was announced to be in development in August 1995, although it was never released.

Hamster Corporation released the game as part of their Arcade Archives series for the Nintendo Switch and PlayStation 4, as well as their Arcade Archives 2 series for the Nintendo Switch 2, PlayStation 5 and Xbox Series X/S in May 2026.
