= Phelios =

1989 video game

- Arcade flyer
- Developer: Namco
- Publisher: Namco: EU: Sega (MD)
- Designer: Satoru Yamada
- Platforms: Arcade, Sega Genesis
- Release: Arcade: JP: February 1989; Genesis: JP: July 20, 1990; NA: October 1990; EU: December 1991
- Genre: Scrolling shooter
- Modes: Single-player, multiplayer
- Arcade system: Namco System 2

Phelios (Note: Japanese: フェリオス, Hepburn: Feriosu) is a 1989 vertically scrolling shooter video game developed and published by Namco for arcades. It was released only in Japan in February 1989. It later received a port for the Sega Genesis, which was released in Japan and North America in 1990 and Europe in 1991 by Sega. The Genesis version was released on the Wii's Virtual Console in 2009. Hamster Corporation released the arcade version as part of their Arcade Archives series for the Nintendo Switch and PlayStation 4 in February 2023.

== Gameplay ==
Apollo shooting at enemies in an early level.

The player takes control of the Greek sun god Apollo, riding his winged horse Pegasus, fighting through various locales as they attempt to rescue his sister and moon goddess Artemis from the titan Typhon. The gameplay is based around a series of vertically scrolling levels, which are split up into sections and contain enemies and bosses that must be dealt with in order to progress. Pressing the firing button makes his sword fire a tiny shot, while holding it down charges the sword up, and upon releasing the button the sword shoots a bigger fireball. Even the smallest enemies take multiple hits, so the standard shot is of little use. Each of the game's seven stages is divided into between two and four sections (the transition from one to another is indicated by a block of Japanese text appearing at the bottom of the screen and a change in music). At the end of every stage, Apollo must also defeat a boss character from Greek myth: Medusa, the Graeae, the Siren, Antaeus, Scylla (who has taken on the form of the "Crystal Brain" from the aforementioned Bakutotsu Kijūtei), Cerberus, and Typhon himself; once he has done so, he will proceed to the enchanted mirror at the back of the boss character temple, before the game segues into the next stage. Apollo can take up to four hits before dying (indicated by the "playing-cards" hearts at the bottom of the screen, and determined by how the cabinet is set), but will die instantly if he flies into a wall or touches a boss's head. This game also features voice samples (in Japanese for the original arcade and Japanese Mega Drive versions, but in English for the North American Genesis and European Mega Drive versions). If the "rank select" option in the arcade version's option menu has been set to "on", players will also be able to select an "easy" or "hard" game mode, once they have inserted their coin, but the "easy" mode only features the first four stages and does not feature the game's complete ending sequence as a result of it.

== Plot ==
The player takes control of the knight Apollo, the god of the sun, who sets off on the legendary winged horse Pegasus, to rescue his lover, Artemis, the goddess of the moon, from the Titan, Typhon. The game takes names and little else from Greek mythology in which Apollo, god of the sun, was actually Artemis's brother. The game shows players an Artemis that acts as a princess (but in Greek mythology, she was the goddess of the hunt, and took pride in never being with any man).

== Release ==
The arcade version of this game was never released in the United States, due to Artemis's "bondage/torture" scenes, which were shown between each stage, and were similar to those from the new version of Namco's own Rolling Thunder; while no nudity is shown, the scenes were still somewhat "strong" to be shown in an arcade game during the early 16-bit era.

== Reception ==
Reception

Review score
| Publication | Score |
|---|---|
| GamePro | GEN: 21/25 |

The Japanese magazine Game Machine listed Phelios in their March 1, 1989 issue as being the third most-popular arcade game at the time.
