= Mach Storm =

2013 video game

- Developer: Bandai Namco Games
- Publisher: Bandai Namco Games
- Director: Kazushi Imoto
- Series: Ace Combat
- Platform: Arcade
- Release: JP: December 19, 2013; NA: February 2014
- Genre: Air combat simulation
- Mode: Single-player

Mach Storm (Note: Japanese: マッハストーム, Hepburn: Mahha Sutōmu) is a 2013 combat flight simulation arcade game developed and published by Namco Bandai Games. The player controls a fighter craft, the leader of the Storm Squadron, in a mission to prevent a terrorist group from attacking major cities worldwide. Its gameplay involves destroying fleets of enemy fighters with a lock-on targeting system and avoiding collisions with their projectiles and level obstacles. Five levels are present, each taking place in famous cities such as Miami, Tokyo, and Washington, D.C.

Directed by Kazushi Imoto with assistance from the Project Aces development division, Mach Storm is based on the company's Ace Combat franchise, specifically Ace Combat: Assault Horizon (2011), being the first arcade Ace Combat game since Air Combat 22 of 1995, though it is not directly connected to the series. It was created for Namco Bandai's "P.O.D." arcade cabinet, which uses air blowers and vibrating seats to immerse the player in the game. Originally named Sonic Storm, the development team focused on making the game appealing towards a casual audience, using simplistic mechanics to create the feeling of flight. Mach Storm was well-received for its arcade cabinet and gameplay, and has been used to describe modern-day arcades and their focus on experiences that are unable to be recreated elsewhere.

== Gameplay ==
The player pursuing an enemy near the Eiffel Tower.

Mach Storm is an air combat arcade game. In it, the player pilots a CFA-44 Nosferatu air superiority fighter, the flight leader of the Storm Squadron, in a mission to prevent a terrorist group from attacking major cities worldwide. The player can select from one of five different locations, which vary in difficulty: Tokyo, Washington, D.C., Dubai, Miami, and Paris. In each location, the player is tasked with destroying formations of enemy fighters and avoid collision with their projectiles; the players' own shots automatically lock onto nearby targets. The game forces the player along a fixed path, though they are given a limited range of movement to dodge buildings and other obstacles in their way. Destroying enemies in succession creates combo streaks that yield additional points. Levels conclude in a boss fight with a craft unique to that area, such as stealth bombers. If the boss is defeated, the player is given the option to insert another credit to play a special bonus stage, where they are given 60 seconds to destroy as many enemies as they can to earn additional points.

== Development ==
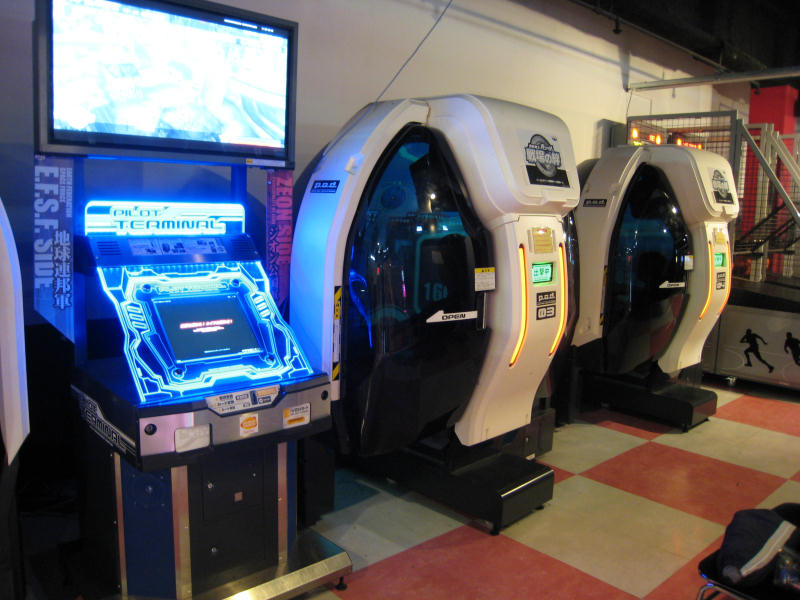

Development of Mach Storm was directed by Namco Bandai Games designer Kazushi Imoto, who is known for his work on the company's virtual reality-focused entertainment complexes. The game is based on the company's Ace Combat series, particularly Ace Combat: Assault Horizon (2011), and borrows many of its mechanics and assets, though it is not directly connected to the series. Inamoto worked closely with Project Aces, the internal development team behind Ace Combat, during production. Mach Storm was designed to be simplistic and appeal towards a casual audience, as Inamoto wanted as many people as possible to experience the exhilarating feeling of flight. Inspiration was derived from the Ace Combat games, the action film Top Gun, and other Hollywood movies.

Mach Storm uses Namco Bandai's "P.O.D." arcade cabinet, which was utilized for games such as Banpresto's Mobile Suit Gundam: Bonds of the Battlefield (2007). The cabinet possesses air blowers, seat vibration, and a globular screen to immerse the player in the game. Inamoto felt the cabinet would work well for an air combat game and would help increase the game's appeal to western audiences. The development team worked to make the cabinet and the game's simplicity intriguing and provide replay value for players. Test-marketing was conducted in Japan in July 2013, where it was originally named Sonic Storm. It was released in Japan on December 19, 2013, and in North America in February 2014; the Japanese version was published under the original Namco label.

== Reception ==
Mach Storm was well received by critics, who focused primarily on its arcade cabinet. Kodai Kurimoto of Inside Games stated the machine alone made it worth playing. Writing for Game Watch, Kenji Saeki believed that Mach Storm retained the impressive technology of Mobile Suit Gundam: Bonds of the Battlefield, specifically with its sense of speed and trill. He believed its usage of vibration and wrap-around screen invoked a sense of power within players, and was a must-play for arcade goers. Famitsu staff agreed, adding that the overall look of the machine was unique and made it stand out. 4Gamer's Tetsuya Inamoto was impressed with the arcade cabinet, complimenting its "magnificent" globular screen, vibration effects, and air blowers, saying they provided a sense of reality and made the player feel as if they're really flying a fighter craft.

The gameplay of Mach Storm was also received favorably. Kurimoto called it "exhilarating", and added to the game's level of appeal. The more casual playstyle was liked by Saeki and Inamoto, who also enjoyed its fast-paced action and lock-on targeting system. Kodai thought the controls were confusing to use at first, though he believed players would become used to it as the game progressed. Not all critics agreed on the gameplay; Inamoto, while he thought it was fun enough and worth playing, felt that Mach Storm was only great through its immersive arcade cabinet, and without it would greatly lose its appeal. Multiple publications, including Excite and Retro Gamer, have used Mach Storm as a way to describe modern-day arcades and their focus on experiences and games that unable to be replicated elsewhere.
