= Dunk Mania =

1996 video game

- Developer: Namco
- Publisher: Namco
- Platform: Arcade
- Release: JP: May 1996
- Genre: Sports
- Modes: Single-player, multiplayer
- Arcade system: Namco System 11

Dunk Mania is an arcade video game developed and published by Namco in 1996.

== Gameplay ==
Dunk Mania is a basketball game that features motion-capture in a two-on-two slam-dunk contest.

== Reception ==
Reception

Review score
Publication	Score
Next Generation	2/5

Dunk Mania was only a moderate success in Japan. Next Generation stated that "in following the herd, one does begin to wonder whether it's a flashy first effort with deeper games to come, or if it's just a great-looking, cookie cutter basketball coin-op with no real sense of the sport itself underneath all the glitz."

== Reviews ==
- Edge
