= Dirt Fox =

1989 video game

- Arcade flyer
- Developer: Namco
- Publisher: Namco
- Composer: Shinji Hosoe
- Platform: Arcade
- Release: JP: June 1989
- Genre: Racing
- Modes: Single-player, multiplayer
- Arcade system: Namco System 2

Dirt Fox (ダートフォックス, Dāto Fokkusu) is a 1989 racing arcade video game developed and published only in Japan by Namco. It runs on Namco System 2 hardware, and lets up to eight people play simultaneously, when eight cabinets are linked together. This is similar to Namco's own Final Lap, which was released two years earlier and allows up to eight people to play simultaneously, when four two-player cabinets are linked together.

== Gameplay ==
Each player must take control of a colour-coded car (red for 1P, green for 2P, blue for 3P and yellow for 4P) which are competing in an off-road race. They are given a preset amount of time to finish each of the track's six sections and for every section of the track that is successfully completed, the players' time gets extended. If any one of the players fail to successfully complete the current section of the track before their time runs out, the game will, like in other Namco multiplayer racing titles (such as the aforementioned Final Lap), instantly be over and the race will continue without them. Between four and seven purple CPU-controlled cars will also start the race alongside the players, but they may catch up with additional ones in preset positions on the track.

== Reception ==
In Japan, Game Machine listed Dirt Fox on their August 15, 1989 issue as being the twelfth most-successful upright/cockpit arcade game of the month.
