= Tinkle Pit =

1993 video game

- Arcade flyer
- Developer: Namco
- Publisher: Namco
- Designer: Kohji Kenjoh
- Composer: Yoshie Arakawa
- Platform: Arcade
- Release: JP: March 1994
- Genre: Maze
- Modes: Single-player, multiplayer

Tinkle Pit (Note: Japanese: ティンクルピット, Hepburn: Tinkuru Pitto) is a 1994 maze video game developed and published by Namco for arcades. It was only released in Japan in March 1994. Hamster Corporation released the game as part of their Arcade Archives series for the Nintendo Switch in July 2024. All graphics featuring Ms. Pac-Man were replaced by Pac-Man due to the ongoing AtGames dispute.

== Gameplay ==
Pitt laying down wire in the game's second world.

Pitt (and Patti) must walk around the mazes, collecting items and avoiding enemies; however, they have the power to drop their Tinker Balls, which are both invulnerable to the enemies, and move around by pressing the Line button, thereby creating a line between them and their balls. Releasing the button makes their balls come back to them; the enemies are killed by having the balls slam into them. There are also pieces of popcorn which can be picked up around the mazes - and pressing the Popcorn button, Pitt and Patti can throw them at the enemies, which bounce off the walls until they hit an enemy (or evaporate if they have not done so by the end of the stage). Killing all enemies in a maze advances the player to the next stage; however, in the event of one enemy remaining, he will make for the nearest corner of the maze, say "Bye-bye!", and disappear (which detracts from the "Pursuit Bonus" that the players receive after they defeat Mao at the end of the game). It includes cameo appearances from many characters from the company's earlier games (including: the Galaxian flagship, Pac-Man, the Rally-X Special Flag, the Solvalou from Xevious, Mappy from his self-titled game and several others).

In Tinkle Pit, there are eight different worlds in all, with the first only containing four levels, and the other seven containing six levels.

== Reception ==
In Japan, Game Machine listed Tinkle Pit on their April 15, 1994 issue as being the twenty-first most-popular arcade game at the time.

Scott Alan Marriot of Classic Gamer in 2004 believed Tinkle Pit carried the same kind of simplicity present in games like Pac-Man (1980) and Dig Dug (1982). In 2015, Retro Gamer found the game to be strange yet charming, liking its level variety and simplistic mechanics. They blamed the genre's severe decline in popularity and its confinement to Japan as the reasons for its obscurity, and said that it would appeal to Namco fans for its amount of references and cameos to their other properties. Retro Gamer also viewed it as a good example of the transitioning video and arcade game scene of the decade, writing: "If you ever need reminding that the arcade market of the early Nineties was a weird, transitional scene, Tinkle Pit should serve well."
