= World Stadium =

World Stadium series
- Genre: Sports game
- Developer: Namco
- Publisher: Namco
- Platform: Arcade
- Original release: JP: 1988-2001; NA: 1994 (Great Sluggers '94)
- Parent series: Family Stadium

World Stadium (full title: Pro Yakyū World Stadium (Note: Japanese: プロ野球ワールドスタジアム, Hepburn: Puro Yakyū Wārudo Sutajiamu)) is a series of baseball arcade games that were released by Namco in the late 1980s and 1990s; they were spin-offs of the Family Stadium franchise, inspired by the 1986 Famicom game Pro Yakyū Family Stadium, and its sequel Pro Yakyū Family Stadium '87. Except for Great Sluggers '94, which was also released in America, all of the games were exclusive to Japan.

== Namco System 1 era (1988–90) ==
The first three titles in the series, World Stadium (Note: Japanese: ワールドスタジアム, Hepburn: Wārudo Sutajiamu) (1988), World Stadium '89 Kaimakuban (Note: Japanese: ワールドスタジアム'89開幕版, Hepburn: Wārudo Sutajiamu '89 Kaimakuban) (1989), and World Stadium '90 (Note: Japanese: ワールドスタジアム'90, Hepburn: Wārudo Sutajiamu '90) (1990) all ran on Namco System 1 hardware, and featured twelve teams from the "Urban League" (the Giants, Cars, Drasans, Sparrows, Wheels, and Titans), and "Country League" (the Lionels, Bravos, Hornets, Fires, Orients, and Buckaroos); they also featured three stadiums for matches to take place in (Kōrakuen, Kōshien and Mejā). The first two of these stadiums' scoreboards had clocks which started at 6:00 and advanced as the matches progressed (but broke at midnight), and the third stadium's scoreboard also featured the logo of Atari, Inc., then Namco's distributor in the United States.

World Stadium was Japan's second highest-grossing arcade game of 1988. It went on to be Japan's seventh highest-grossing arcade conversion kit of 1991.

== Namco System 2 era (1991–93) ==
The next four titles in the series, Super World Stadium (Note: Japanese: スーパーワールドスタジアム, Hepburn: Sūpā Wārudo Sutajiamu) (1991), Super World Stadium '92 (Note: Japanese: スーパーワールドスタジアム'92, Hepburn: Sūpā Wārudo Sutajiamu '92) (1992), Super World Stadium '92 Gekitōban (Note: Japanese: スーパーワールドスタジアム'92激闘版, Hepburn: Sūpā Wārudo Sutajiamu '92 Gekitōban) (1992), and Super World Stadium '93 Gekitōhen (Note: Japanese: スーパーワールドスタジアム'93激闘編, Hepburn: Sūpā Wārudo Sutajiamu '93 Gekitōhen) all ran on Namco System 2 hardware; the first of these featured sixteen teams (the Lionels, Buckaroos, Fires, Orients, Giants, Cars, Wheels, Drasans, Sparrows, and Titans from the first three titles, as well as six new teams: the Blue Arrows, Homes, Orbies, Fifties, Nationals, and Americans), but the other three featured the twelve (real-life) teams from the Japanese Central and Pacific Baseball Leagues (the Seibu Lions, Kintetsu Buffaloes, Orix BlueWave, Nippon-Ham Fighters, Fukuoka Daiei Hawks, and Chiba Lotte Marines of the Central League, and the Hiroshima Toyo Carp, Chunichi Dragons, Yakult Swallows, Yomiuri Giants, Yokohama Taiyo Whales (later the Yokohama DeNA Baystars), and Hanshin Tigers of the Pacific League). They also featured four stadiums for matches to take place in (Dome, Kōshien from the first three titles, Seaside and Manhattan) - again, the first three stadiums' scoreboards had clocks upon them (the third was digital), but they were broken (and the first two were stuck at 6:00, while the third just displayed the colon between the numbers). SWS '92 G also introduced a "FAVOR" setting in its options menu.

== Namco NB-1 era (1993–97) ==
The next arcade baseball game Namco released was Great Sluggers: New World Stadium in 1993. It was the first to run on Namco NB-1 hardware, and featured the 12 teams from Nippon Professional Baseball. A sequel was also released in 1994, titled Great Sluggers '94 in Japan and Great Sluggers: Featuring 1994 Team Rosters in America. The Japanese version featured Nippon Professional Baseball teams, and the American version featured Major League Baseball teams. The next three titles in the series, Super World Stadium '95, (Note: Japanese: スーパーワールドスタジアム'95, Hepburn: Sūpā Wārudo Sutajiamu '95) Super World Stadium '96, (Note: Japanese: スーパーワールドスタジアム'96, Hepburn: Sūpā Wārudo Sutajiamu '96) and Super World Stadium '97 (Note: Japanese: スーパーワールドスタジアム'97; Sūpā Wārudo Sutajiamu '97) and featured the twelve real-life teams from the three previous games; they also featured six stadiums for their matches to take place in (Hillside, Trad, Urban, Kaihei Dome, Air Dome, and Seaside from the last four games). SWS '96 also introduced five "optional ball clubs" - the Sixties, Seventies, Eighties, Nineties and USA, while the Urban Stadium was merely the Kōshien Stadium from the previous games renamed.

== Namco System 12 era (1998–2001) ==
The last four titles in the series, Super World Stadium '98, (Note: Japanese: スーパーワールドスタジアム'98, Hepburn: Sūpā Wārudo Sutajiamu '98) Super World Stadium '99, (Note: Japanese: スーパーワールドスタジアム'99, Hepburn: Sūpā Wārudo Sutajiamu '99) Super World Stadium 2000, (Note: Japanese: スーパーワールドスタジアム2000, Hepburn: Sūpā Wārudo Sutajiamu 2000) and Super World Stadium 2001 (Note: Japanese: スーパーワールドスタジアム2001, Hepburn: Sūpā Wārudo Sutajiamu 2001) all ran on Namco System 12 hardware, and featured eighteen teams (the twelve real-life teams from the last six games and the USA team from the last two, along with five new teams: the Central League All-Stars, Pacific League All-Stars, Namco All-Stars, Nikotama Gals, and User Team). It also featured twelve stadiums for its matches to take place in (Seaside from the last seven games and Hillside, Air Dome, Urban, Trad, and Kaihei Dome from the last three games - along with the new Bay Area, Owari Dome, Naniwa Dome, Forest, Setōchi, and Kasenjiki). The Namco All-Stars and Nikotama Gals feature twenty-three of Namco's most famous characters, but the pitchers of the former team are merely named after five others.
