= Ridge Racer 2 (2006 video game) =

Racing video game

- European version cover art featuring Soldat Raggio
- Developer: Namco Bandai Games
- Publisher: Namco Bandai Games (Note: Released under the Namco label): EU: Sony Computer Entertainment
- Series: Ridge Racer
- Platform: PlayStation Portable
- Release: JP: 14 September 2006; EU: 13 October 2006; AU: 19 October 2006
- Genre: Racing
- Modes: Single-player, multiplayer

Ridge Racer 2, released in Japan as Ridge Racers 2 (Note: Japanese: リッジレーサーズ2, Hepburn: Rijji Rēsāzu Tsu) is a 2006 racing video game developed and published by Namco Bandai Games for the PlayStation Portable. It is the twelfth main installment in the Ridge Racer series. It is a sequel to Ridge Racer, which was released as a launch title for the console. It adds more extra content with additional tracks recycled from older titles of the series, as well as two new game modes called Duel and Survival.

On 20 December 2022, Ridge Racer 2 was made available worldwide to download on PlayStation 4 and PlayStation 5 as part of the PlayStation Plus Premium subscription service, and from 15 August 2023 as a standalone purchasable title. This also marked the first time that the game was released in North America.

== Gameplay ==
The core aspect of the entire Ridge Racer series is drift racing, that is traditional lap racing against opponents with the added twist of intentionally oversteering and sliding the car through sharp corners and turns, known as "drifting", which earns the player several bonuses during a race. In most respects Ridge Racer 2 can be considered more of an update than a true sequel to the original PSP title - it shares the same game play engine, user interface and game design as the previous title, and includes almost all of the elements, cars, and tracks of its predecessor.

Featuring three times as much gameplay time as its predecessor however, the differences lie in the addition of a total of 42 new racing tracks, consisting of 21 unique tracks and variations where the track is driven in reverse; 18 are taken from previous titles in the Ridge Racer franchise. Two tracks are from the original Ridge Racer, three tracks are from Ridge Racer Revolution, four tracks are from Rave Racer, eight tracks are from R4: Ridge Racer Type 4, and four tracks are from Rage Racer. Every track from every PlayStation Ridge Racer game released is included as part of this package. Numerous new game play modes are included to supplement the originals of the previous title such as: Duel and Survival modes. As with the previous title, Single Race and Wireless Battle mode is still included, although Single Race was renamed to Arcade.

In-game screenshot of a custom race, taking place on the track "Shuttleloop Highway". The featured car is Kamata Fiera Type-S.

The game also features a total of 62 fictional cars (referred to as "machines" throughout the game) from seven fictional manufacturers (Kamata, Âge, Danver, Gnade, Assoluto, Himmel, and Soldat) that are staple throughout the Ridge Racer series. The full complement of cars is available to the player after completing three Tours (consisting of 16 races each) of increasing difficulty levels (Basic, Pro, and EX) and several various mini-games. In addition to newer cars, Ridge Racer 2 features "prizes" that are unlocked after the completion of a tour, such as opening movies of previous Ridge Racer titles and E3 demo presentations.

The Special Class cars from Ridge Racer (PSP) have been modified for this release and categorised into two tiered categories with four cars each. Special Class 1 denotes cars embodying more traditional supercar designs and appearances, while Special Class 2 is made up of radical or novelty designs that boast the highest top speeds attainable in the game. Specifically, the 'Kamata Angelus' (Special Class 1) and 'Soldat Crinale' (Special Class 1) possess their appearances from Ridge Racer V, while the Pac-Man car (Special Class 2) now resembles a miniature aircraft in design (with Pac-Man himself depicted as piloting it), and is no longer powered by propellers. The New Rally-X car has been removed entirely and replaced by the 'Danver Hijack' (Special Class 1); a large, super-charged Pickup truck as seen in Ridge Racer 6. The 'Yamasa Raggio' (Special Class 2), which appeared in the 2006 Tokyo Auto Salon as a heavily modified Honda NSX, is unique to Ridge Racer 2 and also appears in a "prize" movie that is unlocked after completion of the game's "EX tour". The car was later made into a Tomica die-cast toy car for limited release. The three other special class cars are the Âge Angelus Kid (Special Class 2), Âge Crinale Kid (Special Class 2), and Terrazi Wild Gang (Special Class 1).

The game also features a FMV opening, that shows series mascot Reiko Nagase.

=== Nitrous ===
Notable also is the "nitrous boost" system from the previous game, which works in the same manner as before. The player has a Nitrous Gauge made up of three nitrous tanks, which at the start of a race are either completely depleted or only partially full. As the player drifts through the corners (especially at very high slip angles) during the race, their nitrous gauge fills up. When the player fills up one of the three nitrous tanks, it can be activated to achieve a temporary speed boost. The nitrous tanks cannot be recharged while any tank is in use though, but the residual speed increase when the nitrous boost expires can be used just before entering corners to recharge the player's nitrous tanks at a faster rate than normal.

== Reception ==
Reception

Aggregate score
Aggregator	Score
Metacritic	70/100

Review scores
Publication	Score
Edge	7/10
Eurogamer	7/10
Famitsu	32/40
GamesMaster	89%
GamesTM	6/10
PlayStation Official Magazine – UK	8/10
PALGN	7/10
Play	78%
PSM3	50%
VideoGamer.com	7/10
The Sydney Morning Herald	3.5/5

The game received "average" reviews according to the review aggregation website Metacritic.

Whilst Ridge Racer 2 was still praised for the same points as the previous title, reviewers were disappointed that the game is little different from it. The game runs on the same graphical engine and the visuals look almost exactly the same, with the most notable changes being additional courses. In Japan, Famitsu gave it a score of one seven, two eights, and one nine for a total of 32 out of 40. Edge magazine ranked the game 70th on their 100 Best Video Games in 2007.
