= Kohta Takahashi =

Kohta Takahashi 高橋 弘太 高橋 コウタ
- Also known as: Kohta; Kohta "SOLIDSTATE" Takahashi
- Born: October 5, 1972 (age 53); Yokohama, Kanagawa, Japan
- Genres: Techno; electronica; house; big beat; jazz fusion; chiptune; video game music
- Occupations: Composer; musician; guitarist
- Years active: 1989–present

Kohta Takahashi (Japanese: 高橋 弘太, romanized: Takahashi Kōta, usually spelt 高橋 コウタ; born October 5, 1972) is a Japanese composer. He is best known for his work on Namco games, including multiple Ridge Racer and Klonoa titles, as well as Ace Combat 2 and the console version of Tekken 5.

== Early life ==
Takahashi grew up with a father who was the drummer of a jazz band and a mother who particularly liked classical music, which led to him growing up with a wide variety of music. As a young child, he attended a classical piano class which developed his initial understanding of music. He wrote his first composition aged 6-8, titled "Umai". He later became interested in video games and their music, where he programmed his compositions on various computers. During his high school and college years, he composed for various doujin game projects and created an album of video game music arrangements and original compositions created using a PC-88, titled Kohta Takahashi's Fuckin' Sounds.

== Namco work (1995–2001) ==
Originally, Takahashi had aimed to enter the game industry as a programmer, but he decided to send demo tapes of his college music work to Namco, whose games he had enjoyed since childhood. At the time he could not play guitar, so after submitting the tape he practiced guitar for six months. Much to his surprise, he was accepted into the company; while he wanted to work in the arcade division, he was assigned to the home console division much to his disappointment, fearing that he had lost his chance to work on Ridge Racer and Air Combat games. However, he was allowed to perform guitar on the opening theme of Ridge Racer Revolution. Nobuhide Isayama, his senior, taught him to play jazz fusion-styled guitar phrases.

His first major project as a composer was for Ace Combat 2, where he served as the lead composer, with much of the soundtrack comprising funk rock music heavily inspired by Top Gun. Takahashi wanted the music to be "stimulating" and intense to convey a sense of anxiety, while making sure it had a distinct flare. In addition to rock tracks, there are also a handful of drum and bass and techno tracks to express the science fiction elements of the game; this direction was further explored for the soundtrack of Ace Combat 3: Electrosphere, which Takahashi did not work on. He also contributed tracks to Klonoa: Door to Phantomile.

In 1998, he composed for R4: Ridge Racer Type 4, which he found difficult due to his relative unfamiliarity with dance-oriented genres, which were outside his musical tastes at the time. He found Hiroshi Okubo, the game's sound director, to be "the gatekeeper to club sound hell" as he frequently rejected his contributions due to them not fitting his musical direction. Despite this, he was able to heavily incorporate electric guitars and breakbeats in some of his tracks.

Takahashi subsequently served as the sound director and lead composer of Ridge Racer V, released in 2000. Aiming to take the game's music in a different direction from previous games, he brought in Japanese electronic music duo Boom Boom Satellites, Takeshi Ueda and German DJ Mijk van Dijk as contributors, along with Namco composers Nobuyoshi Sano, Yuu Miyake, and Yoshinori Kawamoto; the former two worked in Namco's arcade division at the time. This resulted in the game having a diverse soundtrack, encompassing genres such as trance, death metal and breakbeat. His final project at Namco was contributions to Klonoa 2: Lunatea's Veil in 2001; he left the company shortly after the game's release and temporarily ceased his activities in the game industry.

== Freelance work (2001–present) ==
Takahashi resumed his game music work in 2002. One of the first games he worked on as a freelancer was cutscene music for Space Raiders. He was initially asked to write Hollywood-inspired music, but decided to mix elements of electronic. Between 2004 and 2005 he contributed tracks to three games for Namco: Ridge Racers, the console version of Tekken 5, and Ridge Racer 6. Outside of composing video game music, he worked as a lecturer for Konami's vocational school between 2002 and 2005. This led to him contributing one track to Beatmania IIDX 11 IIDXRED in 2004, titled "Resonate 1794". He also worked as a journalist writing about sampling CDs and software for Sound & Recording Magazine, and also co-produced and mixed several releases by electronic musician Hiroshi Fujiwara.

Eventually, Takahashi's interest in writing music for games declined. He was contacted by Makoto Asada of Cave to contribute an arrangement to DoDonPachi DaiOuJou Arrange Album, and accepted the gig but decided that if fans did not take notice of it, he would permanently leave the field of video game music. This led to him contributing to further game arrange albums. In 2010, he formed a unit with Kenji Ito named RESONATOR, working on DoDonPachi DaiFukkatsu Arrange Album as well as the soundtrack for the game Bullet Soul. Ito handled composition and arrangement for all tracks, while Takahashi handled sound design, guitar playing and mixing for roughly half of the soundtrack.

Since the 2010s, Takahashi has published various solo albums of original music, including Core and Everyone, both consisting of tracks he composed in the early 2000s. These tracks have been compared to his work in the Ridge Racer series. In 2022 he released Reiwa Type 4, a concept album imagining how a new Ridge Racer game's soundtrack could sound. This led to the release of another Ridge Racer-inspired album in 2023, titled Reiwa Type V. He also uses Patreon to share work-in-progress and unreleased tracks.

In 2024, he created two remixes for the upcoming rhythm game Friday Night Funkin', intended for the game's Erect difficulty.

== Works ==
Year	Title	Role(s)	Ref.
1995	Ridge Racer Revolution	Guitar (attract music)	
1996	World Stadium EX	Music (newspaper theme), guitar (opening music)	
1996	Rage Racer	Guitar ("Rage Racer")	
1997	Ace Combat 2	Music with Nobuhide Isayama, Tetsukazu Nakanishi and Hiroshi Okubo	
1997	Klonoa: Door to Phantomile	Music with various others	
1998	R4: Ridge Racer Type 4	Music with various others	
2000	Ridge Racer V	Music with various others; sound director	
2001	Klonoa 2: Lunatea's Veil	Music with various others; sound director	
2002	Space Raiders	Cutscene music	
2004	Beatmania IIDX 11: IIDX RED	Arrangement ("Resonate 1794")	
2004	Ridge Racer	Music ("Synthetic Life" and "Night Stream")	
2005	Tekken 5	Console version; music with various others	
2005	Ridge Racer 6	Arrangement ("Galactic Life")	
2011	Bullet Soul	Synth programming, mixing, guitar	
2011	Pop'n Music 20: Fantasia	Arrangement ("The First Space Fight from Falsion")	
2013	Gitadora	Music ("Awaken Ver.G")	
2014	Super Smash Bros. for Nintendo 3DS and Wii U	Arrangement ("Title (Metroid)")	
2017	Dariusburst Chronicle Saviours	DLC; remixes ("Skies Above Ohta-ku" and "Descent into the Clouds")	
2021	Fitness Boxing 2: Rhythm & Exercise	DLC; music ("Evolution")	
2024	Friday Night Funkin'	Remix ("High Erect" and "Fresh Erect")	
2026	Denshattack!	Music with various others	
