= Ridge Racer Accelerated =

2009 mobile game

- Title screen featuring Soldat Raggio, Assoluto Bisonte, and Reiko Nagase
- Developer: Namco Networks
- Publisher: Namco Networks
- Series: Ridge Racer
- Platforms: iOS, Android
- Release: WW: 15 December 2009
- Genre: Racing
- Mode: Single-player

Ridge Racer Accelerated is a 2009 racing video game developed and published by Namco Networks for mobile phones. It was released for iOS, SoftBank 006SH with 3D screen, and Amazon Kindle Fire on Android. It is part of the Ridge Racer video game series. The game was released on the App Store, Google Play and Amazon App Store and it uses micro-transactions for unlocking more courses and an extra car class. There are three cars available per class, with six cars more to be unlocked during the game's progress. The game also features an SP1 class consisting of prototype cars. The game features an Arcade, Duel, Survival and Time Attack mode. The game uses the same engine, race courses and menu system from Ridge Racer 2 (PSP). It features a full motion video opening that stars Reiko Nagase.

== Gameplay ==
In-game screenshot of an arcade race

The core aspect of the entire Ridge Racer series is drift racing, that is traditional lap racing against opponents with the added twist of intentionally oversteering and sliding the car through sharp corners and turns, known as "drifting", which earns the player several bonuses during a race.

Controlling the car is done by tilting to steer and on screen buttons for accelerating, decelerating and nitrous.

Notable also is the "nitrous boost" system from the previous games in the series. The player has a Nitrous Gauge made up of three nitrous tanks, which at the start of a race are either completely depleted or only partially full. As the player drifts through the corners (especially at very high slip angles) during the race, their nitrous gauge fills up. When the player fills up one of the three nitrous tanks, it can be activated to achieve a temporary speed boost. The nitrous tanks cannot be recharged while any tank is in use though, but the residual speed increase when the nitrous boost expires can be used just before entering corners to recharge the player's nitrous tanks at a faster rate than normal.

The game features 8 unique courses (16 when played in reverse) with 3 more (6 when played in reverse) that can be bought in-game, all taken from previous PlayStation games. Including purchased courses (forward and reversed), the total number of tracks comes to 22.

The cars in the game include six classes, each increasing in speed and difficulty. There is a seventh (Special) class.

The game features 48 cars (referred to as machines), based on 12 basic models. Each class of cars has nine cars, six of which have to be unlocked. The Special Class has only three cars, one of which is available to drive right away. Including purchased cars, the total rides comes to 57.

== Reception ==
Reception

Aggregate score
Aggregator	Score
Metacritic	50/100

Review scores
Publication	Score
IGN	5/10
Pocket Gamer	2/5

The game received "mixed" reviews according to the review aggregation website Metacritic.
