= Ridge Racer 64 =

2000 video game

- Ridge Racer 64 cover art featuring Reiko Nagase and Ultra 64
- Developer: Nintendo Software Technology (Note: Additional support by Namco)
- Publisher: Nintendo: NA: Namco Hometek (DS)
- Director: Akila Redmer
- Producer: Scott Cuthbertson
- Programmer: Claude Comaire
- Artist: Raymond Yan
- Composer: Keith Arem
- Series: Ridge Racer
- Platforms: Nintendo 64, Nintendo DS
- Release: Nintendo 64: NA: February 14, 2000; EU: July 4, 2000; Nintendo DS: NA: December 7, 2004; AU: May 22, 2005; EU: June 3, 2005
- Genre: Racing
- Modes: Single-player, multiplayer

Ridge Racer 64 is a 2000 racing video game developed by Nintendo Software Technology and published by Nintendo for the Nintendo 64. It is the first title of Namco's Ridge Racer series to not be on arcades or a PlayStation console, with Namco licensing the series to Nintendo to develop the game. In 2004, the game was remade for the Nintendo DS as Ridge Racer DS, which uses the system's features such as the touch-screen and wireless multi-player. Additionally, Gina Cavalli from R: Racing Evolution replaced Reiko Nagase as the mascot in the DS version. The N64 version received its first official re-release on the Nintendo Classics service on January 31, 2025; followed by a Japanese release in May 16, 2025.

== Gameplay ==
The game features a total of 20 race tracks, including some drawn from Ridge Racer and Ridge Racer Revolution.

== Reception ==
Reception

Aggregate score
| Aggregator | Score | |
| Aggregator | DS | N64 |
|---|---|---|
| Metacritic | 63/100 | 82/100 |

Review scores
| Publication | Score | |
| Publication | DS | N64 |
|---|---|---|
| CNET Gamecenter | N/A | 8/10 |
| Electronic Gaming Monthly | 5.17/10 (Note: Two critics of Electronic Gaming Monthly gave the DS version each a score of 6.5/10, and the other gave it 2.5/10.) | 8/10 (Note: Two critics of Electronic Gaming Monthly gave the Nintendo 64 version each a score of 8/10, one gave it 7.5/10, and the other gave it 8.5/10 in an early review.) |
| EP Daily | N/A | 7.5/10 |
| Eurogamer | 6/10 | N/A |
| Game Informer | 7/10 | 7.25/10 |
| GameFan | N/A | (T.R.) 97% 91% (Note: In GameFan's early viewpoint of the Nintendo 64 version, three critics gave it each a score of 94, 91, and 88.) |
| GameSpot | 6.6/10 | 8.4/10 |
| GameSpy | 3.5/5 | N/A |
| Hyper | N/A | 90% |
| IGN | 7.5/10 | 9/10 |
| N64 Magazine | N/A | 91% |
| Next Generation | N/A | 4/5 |
| Nintendo Power | 3.6/5 | 7.9/10 |
| Nintendo World Report | 6/10 | N/A |
| Detroit Free Press | 2/4 | N/A |
| The Sydney Morning Herald | 2/5 | N/A |

The N64 version received "generally favorable" reviews, while the DS remake received "mixed or average" reviews, according to the review aggregation website Metacritic.

=== N64 original ===
Michael Wolf of NextGen gave a positive review for the Nintendo 64 version. Joe Ottoson of AllGame gave it four-and-a-half stars out of five, saying, "If you're looking for some intense but uncomplicated racing action, Ridge Racer 64 is nearly at the peak of straight up racing action on the Nintendo 64. With a wide variety of tracks and plenty of hidden cars to unlock there's a lot to see and win over the course of the game." Michael "Major Mike" Weigand of GamePro said of the same Nintendo 64 version in one review, "Arcade racing fans who have had to be content with SF Rush and Cruis'n titles will find Ridge Racer 64 a big improvement. Although the multiplayer races are a disappointment, solo compeitors will want to add this title to their collections." (Note: GamePro gave the Nintendo 64 version three 4.5/5 scores for graphics, control, and fun factor, and 4/5 for sound in one review.) In another GamePro review, however, The Freshman called it "a decent game for people who must have every Ridge Racer known to man, but last year's Ridge Racer Type 4 was much better. In the supersaturated world of N64 racing, RR64 barely manages to keep up." (Note: GamePro gave the Nintendo 64 version 4/5 for graphics, 3.5/5 for sound, 2.5/5 for control, and 3/5 for fun factor in another review.)

=== DS remake ===
Later, however, GamePro said of the DS version, "with a frustrating control scheme, Ridge Racer only stays in low gear. It's lucky that this driver is one of the first out of the DS gates, or else it wouldn't have stood a chance." (Note: GamePro gave the DS version 4/5 for graphics, 3.5/5 for sound, 2/5 for control, and 3/5 for fun factor.)
