= Ridge Racer 7 =

2006 racing video game

- North American box art featuring Kamata RC410 and Assoluto Bisonte
- Developer: Namco Bandai Games
- Publisher: Namco Bandai Games (Note: Released under the Namco label outside North America): EU: Sony Computer Entertainment
- Director: Masaya Kobayashi
- Producer: Isao Nakamura
- Designers: Kazuo Yamamoto; Kenichi Shimada
- Artist: Hideki Nakamura
- Series: Ridge Racer
- Platform: PlayStation 3
- Release: JP: November 11, 2006; NA: November 17, 2006; PAL: March 23, 2007
- Genre: Racing
- Modes: Single-player, multiplayer

Ridge Racer 7 (Note: Japanese: リッジレーサー7, Hepburn: Rijji Rēsā Sebun) is a 2006 racing video game developed and published by Namco Bandai Games for the PlayStation 3. An installment in the Ridge Racer series, it is an enhanced version of Xbox 360 exclusive Ridge Racer 6 with more content, releasing as a launch title for the console.

The game has around 40 cars, many of which are from Ridge Racer 6 and Ridge Racer (PSP). There are also 22 courses, available in forward, reverse and mirrored. The game runs at 1080p native resolution and 60 frames per second. It also features Dolby Digital 5.1 surround sound and free online gameplay via the PlayStation Network. Like many other Ridge Racer games, it features a full motion video opening that stars mascot Reiko Nagase.

The game received positive reviews from critics. A patch was made available in October 2010 titled Ridge Racer 7 3D License Version that enables Ridge Racer 7 to be played in 3D. Following this, Bugbear developed the drastically different Ridge Racer Unbounded, released in 2012.

== Gameplay ==
Gameplay in Seacrest District

As in previous games within the Ridge Racer series, the gameplay centers on high speed circuit racing featuring "drift" handling, where the player slides the car around turns without great loss of speed. New features in this iteration include car body and engine customization which can affect the performance, handling and nitrous boost system of the car. Ridge Racer 7 also actively encourages players to slipstream other cars, whereas previous iterations did not mention that that technique increases speed.

This game sees the "unlimited restarts" return for the first time since Ridge Racer Revolution in 1996, which means the player can restart during the race (including the regular races and the duel races) at any time. The player can re-play the same race series for more points and money. A global ranking system is used to rank players. It uses a combination of FP (Fame points), CR (Credits, the game's currency) and OBP (Online Battle Points, gained in the online races) to work out an overall number of RP (Ridge Points), which are displayed on the player's Ridge State ID Card.

=== Game modes ===
==== Single player ====
- Ridge State Grand Prix - the main game mode consisting of a series of races.
- Manufacturer's Trials - special races where the player can earn new cars or parts to customize their car; if the players get 100 Manufacturer points, they will become a member of one manufacturer.
- UFRA Single Event - special races with restrictions.
- Extreme Battle - boss battles with a much higher difficulty where it is possible to win normal or special cars.
- Arcade - a single player game mode where the player can choose among the unlocked tracks or cars.

==== Multiplayer ====
- Global Time Attack - a time trial mode where players race their cars around the circuits as fast as possible and post their best lap times on a global leaderboard.
- Standard Race - a standard race over the Internet for up to 14 players.
- Pair Time Attack - similar to Global Time Attack, but instead combines the times of two racers working in tandem to achieve fast lap times.
- Team Battle - players are split into red and blue teams (other colors are featured, such as yellow, green and pink), with a points system used to decide which team wins after a race.
- Pair Battle - players are split into teams of two to race, and the winning team is that with the smallest total race time.
- UFRA Special Event - a set of 25 extra events, downloaded for free from the PlayStation Store, which boast a much higher difficulty than any event in the Ridge State Grand Prix mode. The choice of cars is often preset or massively narrowed down.

== Development and release ==
The game was first unveiled at the 2006 E3 event in a teaser trailer, and the first trailer of game footage was shown at the 2006 Tokyo Game Show. It was originally released as a launch title for the PlayStation 3 in all regions in 2006 and 2007, in a similar fashion to the first Ridge Racer on PlayStation, Ridge Racer V on PlayStation 2, and Ridge Racer(s) on PlayStation Portable. It has since been re-issued under Sony's "Platinum" and "The Best" budget lines.

== Extras ==
Namco released downloadable extras and content for Ridge Racer 7 through the PlayStation Network on March 22, 2007. This content included extra events (the UFRA Special Events) and special decals for customizing the roof of the car. Players also had the option to purchase extra background music for their game. These add-ons were added to the US PlayStation Store on 1 June. A patch for the game was released in October 2010 to make the game playable in 3D.

The classic arcade game Xevious is unlockable in this game.

== Reception ==
Reception

Aggregate score
Aggregator	Score
Metacritic	78/100

Review scores
Publication	Score
Edge	6/10
Electronic Gaming Monthly	6.83/10
Eurogamer	7/10
Famitsu	36/40
Game Informer	8/10
GamePro	4/5
GameSpot	8/10
GameSpy	4/5
GameTrailers	7.8/10
GameZone	8.5/10
IGN	(US) 8.3/10 (UK) 7.9/10
Official U.S. PlayStation Magazine	6/10
The Sydney Morning Herald	4/5

The game received "generally favorable reviews" according to the review aggregation website Metacritic. In Japan, Famitsu gave it a score of all four nines for a total of 36 out of 40.
