= Ridge Racer (2011 video game) =

2011 racing video game

- PAL region cover art featuring Kamata SYNCi
- Developer: Cellius
- Publisher: Namco Bandai Games (Note: Published under the Namco brand)
- Series: Ridge Racer
- Platform: PlayStation Vita
- Release: JP: 17 December 2011; EU: 22 February 2012; AU: 23 February 2012; NA: 13 March 2012
- Genre: Racing
- Modes: Single-player, multiplayer

Ridge Racer (Note: Japanese: リッジレーサー, Hepburn: Rijji Rēsā), originally named Ridge Racer Vita (Note: Japanese: リッジレーサーヴィータ, Hepburn: Rijji Rēsā Vīta), is a 2011 racing video game published by Namco Bandai Games for the PlayStation Vita as a launch title, originally on 17 December 2011 in Japan, and internationally from February 2012. It is the 5th handheld game in the Ridge Racer series and the first on a Sony platform since 2006's Ridge Racer 2. It was the first and only game in the series developed by Cellius. The game continues the Ridge Racer tradition of arcade racing and supports single-player as well as local and Wi-Fi multiplayer games. Upon release, Ridge Racer was mostly panned by video game critics due to the lack of a career mode and particularly the lack of content, with much of it locked as paid downloadable content.

== Gameplay ==
It is an arcade-style racing game with high speed drifting. Players can start drifts around corners and steer it to maintain their speed, which charges the car's nitro. This game features slipstreaming which allows players to gain speed by following closely behind opponents. The main game modes are Spot Race, Time Attack and World Race. It has an online mode for up to 8 players and local races over LAN or Wi-Fi. Credits earned from the races can be used to purchase car upgrades.

Gameplay screenshot

== Downloadable content ==
The Hornet from Sega's Daytona USA makes a cameo appearance as available DLC, as well as an exclusive song (with lyrics by Takenobu Mitsuyoshi) and course inspired by both franchises. Other cameos include cars with paint schemes derived from The Idolmaster, as well as DoCoMO and Pac-Man-themed versions of the Kamata SYNCi, the game's cover car. The DoCoMo and Idolmaster cars are not available outside Japan. Other downloadable content include new cars and courses, as well as music tracks from previous entries in the franchise.

== Reception ==
Reception

Aggregate score
| Aggregator | Score |
|---|---|
| Metacritic | 44/100 |

Review scores
| Publication | Score |
|---|---|
| Eurogamer | 3/10 |
| Famitsu | 29/40 |
| Game Informer | 5/10 |
| GamesMaster | 60% |
| GameSpot | 3/10 |
| GameTrailers | 4.5/10 |
| Giant Bomb | 2/5 |
| Hyper | 4/10 |
| IGN | 3/10 |
| PlayStation: The Official Magazine | 5/10 |
| The A.V. Club | D |
| The Digital Fix | 5/10 |

Ridge Racer received "generally unfavorable reviews" according to the review aggregation website Metacritic. In Japan, Famitsu gave it a score of one eight and three sevens for a total of 29 out of 40. Elsewhere, it was critically panned by various publications for its barebones nature and a lack of proper progression, unlike other installments in the series. GameSpot criticized the game's lack of initial content (which consisted only of a limited number of cars and tracks ported from Ridge Racer 7) as a ploy to force users to buy its downloadable content (while its first DLC pack, despite being available for free as a limited time offer, only consisted of more content originating from Ridge Racer 7), resulting in a poor experience that lacked any of the variety of past installments. In conclusion, the game was considered "a complete and utter ripoff", as a cheap cash-in than a fully thought-out product. IGN similarly criticized the game's absolute lack of storyline or progression-based modes or leagues, and unbalanced online races that use a leveling system to determine a player's top speed (giving an unfair disadvantage to newer players). Ridge Racer was described as tech demo, wrapped up in an online-reliant social framework that's fundamentally flawed on several levels. In June 2012, IGN also named Ridge Racer one of its ten "Worst Video Games of 2012 So Far".
