= Ridge Racer =

Racing video game series

- Genre: Racing
- Developers: Namco; Nintendo Software Technology; Namco Bandai Games; Cellius; Bugbear Entertainment
- Publishers: Namco; Sony Computer Entertainment; Nintendo; Namco Bandai Games
- Creators: Yozo Sakagami; Fumihiro Tanaka
- Platforms: Arcade, PlayStation, PlayStation 2, Nintendo 64, GameCube, i-mode, J2ME, Zeebo, Xbox, PlayStation Portable, Nintendo DS, PlayStation 3, Xbox 360, Windows, Nintendo 3DS, PlayStation Vita, iOS, Android
- First release: Ridge Racer; 30 October 1993
- Latest release: Ridge Racer Draw & Drift; 20 October 2016

Ridge Racer (Note: Japanese: リッジレーサー, Hepburn: Rijji Rēsā) is a series of racing video games created by Namco and owned by Bandai Namco Entertainment. The first game, Ridge Racer (1993), was originally released in arcades for the Namco System 22 hardware, later ported to the PlayStation one year later as a launch title. It was met with several sequels and spin-off games for multiple platforms, the latest being the mobile game Ridge Racer Draw & Drift (2016) and the latest mainline game, developed in-house, was Ridge Racer 7 (2006). Gameplay involves the player racing against computer-controlled opponents to be the first to finish in a race. Drifting is a core aspect of the series and is used to keep speed while turning corners; Ridge Racer pioneered the real-life technique in video games. The series is considered influential to the racing game genre. On June 5, 2025, the arcade version of the first game was added to the Arcade Archives and Arcade Archives 2.

== History ==
Release timeline
1993	Ridge Racer
1994	Ridge Racer 2
1995	Rave Racer
1995	Ridge Racer Revolution
1996	Rage Racer
1996	Pocket Racer
1997
1998	R4: Ridge Racer Type 4
1999
2000	Ridge Racer 64
2000	Ridge Racer V
2001
2002
2003	R: Racing Evolution
2004	Ridge Racer
2004	Ridge Racer DS
2005	Ridge Racer 6
2005	Critical Velocity
2006	Ridge Racer 7
2006	Ridge Racer 2
2007
2008
2009	Ridge Racer Accelerated
2010	Ridge Racer Drift
2011	Ridge Racer 3D
2011	Ridge Racer
2012	Ridge Racer Unbounded
2013	Ridge Racer Slipstream
2014
2015
2016	Ridge Racer Draw & Drift

Ridge Racer is a spiritual successor to Sim Drive (1992), a racing simulation game met with a limited release in Japanese arcades using an actual body of a Mazda Eunos Roadster. Originally meant as an F1 racing game, similar to Namco's own Pole Position and Final Lap series, it was instead replaced with racing on mountain roads, a popular trend for Japanese car enthusiasts at the time. The PlayStation version was a launch title for the console and was an astounding success for Namco, prompting the creation of several sequels for arcades and home platforms.

Earlier Ridge Racer games received critical acclaim for their graphics, gameplay, and musical score, many citing it as a contributing factor to the success of the PlayStation in its early years. Later entries were criticized for straying too far from the source material and lack of content, with Ridge Racer Vita (2011) being the first game to receive generally negative reception from critics; its base content was considered extremely lacking, with the player forced to obtain the vast majority of additional content by purchasing DLC. The last mainline title, Ridge Racer Unbounded (2012) received mixed-to-average reception from critics.

=== Games list ===
==== Main series ====
- Ridge Racer (1993) is the first entry in the series, originally released for arcades and running on the Namco System 22 arcade system. A PlayStation conversion was released in 1994 and 1995 as a launch title for the console. Two other versions of the game were released for arcades: Ridge Racer Full Scale, which featured a replica Eunos Roadster that the player sat in to control the game, and Ridge Racer: 3-Screen Edition, which used three different monitors to provide a peripheral vision effect, similar to Namco's earlier game Driver's Eyes (1991). A Japanese mobile phone version was released in 2000. The game was also released for J2ME in 2006 and Zeebo in 2009.
- Ridge Racer 2 (1994) was released for arcades, running on the Namco System 22 hardware. It serves as an update to the original game, featuring multiplayer, a rear-view mirror, and a remixed soundtrack composed by Shinji Hosoe.
- Rave Racer (1995) was released for arcades. It features two new tracks alongside the two present in the original Ridge Racer, and had linkable arcade cabinets that allowed for up to eight-person multiplayer. Home conversions for both the PlayStation and Microsoft Windows were announced in 1996, but were later cancelled.
- Ridge Racer Revolution (1995) was released for the PlayStation. It is a modified home release of Ridge Racer 2 with three completely new and different tracks than the arcade and original games, new music, additional vehicles, and multiplayer via the PlayStation Link Cable peripheral.
- Rage Racer (1996) was released for the PlayStation. Alongside the introduction of series mascot Reiko Nagase, it featured customizable cars and a retries rule, both of which have become prominent throughout the franchise. It also features a more gritty and darker graphical style, a departure from the series' more colorful art style.
- R4: Ridge Racer Type 4 (1998) was released for the PlayStation, titled Ridge Racer Type 4 in Europe. It marks the debut of racing teams, which became a core aspect for all games to follow, and is the first PlayStation game in the series to use Gouraud shading for its graphics. Multiplayer modes are also present, being displayed in a split-screen orientation. In 2018, it was released as one of the built-in games on the PlayStation Classic mini console.
- Ridge Racer 64 (2000) was released for the Nintendo 64 in North America and Europe; it was not developed by Namco, who instead licensed the series to Nintendo and developed by its subsidiary Nintendo Software Technology. It includes tracks from Ridge Racer (Arcade) and Ridge Racer Revolution (PS one), alongside new tracks and cars.
- Ridge Racer V (2000) was released as a launch title for the PlayStation 2. An arcade version was released a year later, subtitled Arcade Battle. The original Ridge Racer game's free-form structure is instead replaced with Grand Prix races found in Ridge Racer Type 4.
- Ridge Racer DS (2004) was released as a launch title for the Nintendo DS. A remake of Ridge Racer 64, it includes touch-screen controls that allow the player to use the stylus to steer the car, alongside a multiplayer mode via local wireless multiplayer. Nintendo Software Technology again returned to develop.
- Ridge Racer (2004) was released as a launch title for the PlayStation Portable, and was titled Ridge Racers in Japan. It features tracks, cars and music found in earlier Ridge Racer games, leading it to be described as a "compilation" of the series.
- Ridge Racer 6 (2005) was released as a launch title for the Xbox 360, featuring a total of 130 vehicles and 30 playable tracks, alongside 14-person online multiplayer through Xbox Live.
- Ridge Racer 2 (2006) was released for the PlayStation Portable and was named Ridge Racers 2 in Japan keeping the unique PSP naming scheme. It is a direct sequel to the 2004 Ridge Racers and retains the same concept of the first game featuring tracks, cars and music taken from earlier games in the franchise.
- Ridge Racer 7 (2006) was released as a launch title for the PlayStation 3. It is a largely enhanced and expanded version of Ridge Racer 6.
- Ridge Racer 3D (2011) was released as a launch title for the Nintendo 3DS.
- Ridge Racer (2011) was released as a launch title for the PlayStation Vita. It was developed by Cellius.
- Ridge Racer Unbounded (2012) was released for the Xbox 360, PlayStation 3 and Microsoft Windows. The game is a large departure from the series' core gameplay, instead focusing on vehicular combat akin to the Burnout series. It was developed by Finland-based Bugbear Entertainment.

==== Spin-offs and related games ====
- Pocket Racer (1996) is a spin-off arcade game released exclusively in Japan. Gameplay is near identical to the original Ridge Racer, but all the cars have instead been replaced with "super-deformed" Choro-Q-esque vehicles. A similar concept was included with Ridge Racer Revolution, titled Buggy Mode, which served as the inspiration for Pocket Racer.
- R: Racing Evolution (2003) was released for the GameCube, PlayStation 2 and Xbox, serving as a spin-off of the franchise. The European release was titled R: Racing. It includes over 33 licensed vehicles from real-world car manufacturers, including the 24 Hours of Le Mans and Super GT. The game also has a story mode. Some releases of the GameCube version include Pac-Man Vs. as a free bonus.
- Critical Velocity (2005) is a plot-based spin-off game released in Japan for the PlayStation 2. Known in development as Rune Chaser, it features Ridge Racer vehicles and settings in a more adventure-like game with a storyline.
- Pachi-slot Ridge Racer (2008) is a pachi-slot spin-off of the series, released in Japan. A digital remake was released for the PlayStation 2 in Japan later the same year.
- Pachi-slot Ridge Racer 2 (2009) is a direct sequel to Pachi-slot Ridge Racer, again released in Japan.
- Ridge Racer Accelerated (2009) was released for iOS mobile devices.
- Ridge Racer Drift (2010) was released for J2ME, Windows Mobile, BREW and BlackBerry mobile devices.
- Drift Spirits (2013) is a plot-based touge drifting mobile game released on iOS and Android that continues to be updated as of 2024 though only in Japanese. Cars drive by themselves and the player is expected to tap the screen to drift; it features Ridge Racer's fictional vehicles.
- Ridge Racer Slipstream (2013) was released for iOS and Android mobile devices.
- Ridge Racer Draw & Drift (2016) was released for iOS and Android devices.

== Common elements ==
Gameplay of Ridge Racer Revolution (1995)

The basic gameplay of the Ridge Racer series has remained relatively consistent throughout each installment. The objective is to race against computer-controlled opponents to finish each track in first place — the player begins the game in last place, and have a limited number of laps around the track to complete where they can overtake opponents. Some entries have a time limit that the player must race against, with each completed lap extending the timer; if the timer reaches zero, the game ends regardless of which lap the player was on. Later entries remove the timer and instead requires the player to finish the race in a minimum-assigned place to advance to the next course.

Unlike other racing games, which usually feature closed circuits, Ridge Racer instead has races laid out on streets, beaches, cities and mountains, taking place in the fictional coastal metropolis "Ridge City" — circuit tracks are included in some entries. Nearly every entry in the series features the original tracks from Ridge Racer and Ridge Racer 2, sometimes modified to accompany for certain mechanics. Players can drift their car around corners to maintain speed, as most of the tracks were based on real-world locations that were not intended for race speeds. Ridge Racer Unbounded (2012) removes the drifting mechanic in favor of vehicular combat, similar to the Burnout franchise.

The playable cars each have their own stats and mechanics, such as a faster speed or improved drifting. Many of these are also named after older Namco video games, including Dig Dug, Xevious, NebulasRay, Rolling Thunder, Bosconian and Solvalou. The PlayStation sequel R4: Ridge Racer Type 4 introduces the concept of racing teams for the series, all being named after Dig Dug, Mappy, Pac-Man, Xevious and Galaga. Similar to Namco's own Tekken series, several games feature classic Namco arcade games as short minigames that play during loading screens, a mechanic that was later trademarked by Namco — the PlayStation home port of the original Ridge Racer features Galaxian, while Ridge Racers features New Rally-X. Completing these minigames will award the player with new tracks or cars, sometimes unlocking a full emulated version of the minigame to play.

=== Automakers ===
Starting with Rage Racer, each game offers cars with fictional automakers and model names. Certain manufacturers specialize in a particular component of their cars' performance, such as top speed, grip, and acceleration:

- Kamata (based on Mitsubishi , Toyota and Nissan) – A Japanese brand specializing in basic all-rounder sports coupes and hatchbacks. They also make the Angelus supercar (based on McLaren F1 LM in Ridge Racer 5, a Maserati MC12 in Ridge Racer 6, and a futuristic 6 wheeled car in Ridge Racer 7), one of the fastest cars in the entire series.
- Terrazi (based on Honda) – A Japanese brand specializing in all-rounder cars with bizarre designs, including the Wildboar (a futuristic three-wheeled car exclusive to Ridge Racer Type 4), and the Terrajin (a rocket powered car in Ridge Racer 6 and Ridge Racer 7).
- Lizard/Danver (based on Ford) – An American brand specializing in muscle and sports cars with high acceleration. In Ridge Racer lore, Danver have acquired the names and assets of the Bayonet and Hijack from Lizard following their bankruptcy and liquidation, which occurs after the events of Ridge Racer Type 4.
- Âge (Âge Solo in Ridge Racer Type 4 and Ridge Racer Slipstream, based on Renault ,Peugeot And Citroen) – A French brand specializing in compacts and sports cars with excellent grip.
- Assoluto (based on Alfa Romeo and Lamborghini) – An Italian brand specializing in high-performance sports cars and supercars with high top speeds and unique designs.
- Rivelta/Soldat (based on Bugatti ,Maserati , Venturi and Ferrari) – A French-Italian brand specializing in supercars. They also make the Rumeur hatchback, a car with incredible top speed and handling, as well as the Crinale, or "13th Racing", known as the original "Devil" car that was the rival of the Kamata Angelus. By the events of Ridge Racer (2004), French automaker Soldat had bought out Italian manufacturer, Rivelta.
- Gnade (based on Audi , Mercedes-Benz and BMW) – A German brand specializing in all-rounder luxury and sports coupes and sedans.
- Himmel (based on Porsche) – A German brand specializing in rear-engined sports cars.
- Sinseong Motors (based on Hyundai) – A South Korean brand exclusive to Ridge Racer 7 and Ridge Racer Slipstream that specializes in luxury sports coupes, however, their only car shown in the games is the Sinseong Motors Jujak.
- Lucky & Wild (based on General Motors And Chrysler / Dodge) - First introduced in Ridge Racer 3D, they are an American manufacturer of modern muscle cars and is a fellow rival to Danver. They are also the manufacturer of the Wisdom, formerly a trademark of the now-defunct Lizard. The name of this manufacturer is taken from the Namco arcade game of the same name.

=== Reiko Nagase ===
Designed by Kei Yoshimizu, Reiko Nagase is a virtual idol fictional character who is the mascot and "host" of the Ridge Racer series. Described as a race queen from Tokyo, Reiko officially first appeared and was named in Rage Racer (1996), in the game's full motion video intro directed by Kei Yoshimizu from Keica, also appearing in-game. In R4: Ridge Racer Type 4 (1998), she was given more prominence, as the opening animation, which used a song by Kimara Lovelace, was a short story starring her. Type 4 also introduced a redesign to her 3D model by Kei Yoshimizu. This is when Namco started giving more exposure to the character, heavily using her image to promote the game. She also appears in Ridge Racer 64 (2000).

In 2000, Namco decided to replace Reiko in Ridge Racer V with newcomer Ai Fukami. The character also influenced Namco to create other virtual idols: the aforementioned Hitomi Yoshino, whose most notable appearance outside Japan was in MotoGP 2 and MotoGP 3; Rena Hayami of R: Racing Evolution; and several characters under the name Kei Nagase in the Ace Combat series, who bear a resemblance to Reiko Nagase. One of them, a selectable wingman in Ace Combat 2 (1997), was officially identified as Reiko's younger sister born. Reiko also made appearances in other games – most of them featuring her in the white-and-red outfit from the R4: Ridge Racer Type 4 promotional artwork – including Anna Kournikova's Smash Court Tennis, Pac-Man Fever, and as a bot in 2024's Astro Bot. In March 1999, she was featured in the PlayStation 2 pre-launch real-time technology demo program as the "Ridge Racer Girl". The character has also been featured in other products licensed by Namco, including the first and sixth wave of Namco Gals gashapon and other figurines and garage kits by various manufacturers.

== Reception ==
Aggregate review scores
Game	GameRankings	Metacritic
Ridge Racer	81%	-
Ridge Racer Revolution	79%	-
R4: Ridge Racer Type 4	88%	88
Ridge Racer 64	85%	82
Ridge Racer V	80%	78
Ridge Racer DS	64%	63
Ridge Racer	89%	88
Ridge Racer 6	70%	74
Ridge Racers 2	70%	-
Ridge Racer 7	79%	78
Ridge Racer Accelerated	52%	50
Ridge Racer 3D	75%	75
Ridge Racer Unbounded	69%	71

The original Ridge Racer was very well received by critics for its 3D graphics, audio, and the drifting mechanics. It also received an admirable port to the PlayStation, where it became one of the best selling titles in the console's early lifetime. It is also considered as playing a part in giving Sony's system an edge over rival Sega's Saturn during 1994–1995.

Its sequels during the 1990s were also highly successful, in particular Ridge Racer Type 4, often considered the series' best. Its sequel Ridge Racer V received more mediocre reviews, but the subsequent PSP title achieved very high praise. The series' 'idol' mascot Reiko Nagase, who has appeared in most games since 1996's Rage Racer, has often been rated among the most recognizable female characters in video games.

In 1999, Next Generation listed the Ridge Racer series as number 11 on their "Top 50 Games of All Time", commenting that "there are certainly better car simulations, but when it comes to fun, Ridge Racer, the game that helped make PlayStation cool, is the one we come back to".

The 2011 Vita title was negatively received for various reasons, whilst the latest console game, Ridge Racer Unbounded, was marked with a departure from the drifting style and mechanics of what the series is known for, experimenting with a more destructive style similar to the Burnout series, although Ridge Racer 3D, a launch title for the 3DS, was better received compared to Vita and Unbounded.
