= Ridge Racer 3D =

2011 video game

- North American cover featuring Lucky & Wild Evolver
- Developer: Namco Bandai Games
- Publisher: Namco Bandai Games (Note: Released under the Namco label)
- Designers: Masamichi Yamazaki; Hiroshi Miyagawa; Chika Mizushima
- Composers: Hiroshi Okubo; Taku Inoue; Shinji Hosoe; Rio Hamamoto; Ayako Saso
- Series: Ridge Racer
- Platform: Nintendo 3DS
- Release: JP: 26 February 2011; EU: 25 March 2011; NA: 27 March 2011; AU: 31 March 2011
- Genre: Racing
- Modes: Single-player, multiplayer

Ridge Racer 3D (Note: Japanese: リッジレーサー3D, Hepburn: Rijji Rẽsā Surī Dī) is a 2011 racing video game developed and published by Namco Bandai Games for the Nintendo 3DS. It is the first Ridge Racer series title on a Nintendo platform since Ridge Racer DS (2004) and, as usual for the series, revolves around cars racing around high speed tracks while drifting. The game received positive reviews and was a commercial success.

== Gameplay ==
Gameplay screenshot

The game introduces a Drift button, specially designed for beginners to the Ridge Racer series and allows them to drift easily using one button press.

There are two main gameplay types: Single Player and Versus. Versus is a multi-player mode which allows the ability to play against other players via a wireless connection in Standard Race, One-Make Race and Team Battle by either hosting or joining a race using Nintendo 3DS local play.

Other minor gameplay types include: Records (allowing the player to view their records achieved in Single Player and check local rankings based on records acquired from friends or via StreetPass), AV player (allowing to watch replays of past races while listening to music of choice), Options, and Garage (allowing to view and modify cars the player has acquired).

There are several single player game modes:

- Grand Prix: Competing in a series of races in order to win new cars and nitrous kits or to make them available for purchase.
- Quick Tour: Playing in a series of races automatically generated from the player's preferences:
- Play Time: Time limit of 3 to 30 mins, multiplied by 3 mins.
- Course Type: Recommended, Drift or High Speed.
- Race Category: Choosing from four different categories to race on.
- Standard Race: Selecting a car and track in order to race against 7 opponents.
- One-Make Race: Selecting a track and race against 7 opponents all using the same machine.
- Time Attack: Racing around a track as fast as possible for 3 laps in order to achieve the fastest time or beat a ghost.
- StreetPass Duel: Racing against the ghosts of other players acquired via StreetPass.

== Development and release ==
Namco Bandai had announced the creation of a Ridge Racer for Nintendo's upcoming system at E3 2010. The game was designed to take advantage of the device screen's 3D stereo view.

The game was released in Japan as a launch title on 26 February 2011 and in North America on 22 March, five days prior to the launch of the Nintendo 3DS itself in that region. Ridge Racer 3D was also released in Europe on 25 March and in Australia on 31 March.

== Soundtrack ==
The background music was produced by Namco Bandai's NBGI unit, including Rio Hamamoto, Taku Inoue, Hiroshi Okubo, Akihiko Ishikawa, and Ryo Watanabe. The opening theme (Do You Wanna Ride?) and closing theme (Tonight) vocals and spoken words by Sky Hy and Heather Jonson, from King Street Sounds. The soundtrack album was released on CD on 9 May 2011 by the SuperSweep label.

== Reception ==
=== Commercial ===
Ridge Racer 3D was commercially successful. During its first week, it sold over 34,000 copies. In total, the game sold over 116,000 copies, 20,000 more than its portable predecessor Ridge Racer 2.

=== Critical ===
Reception

Aggregate score
Aggregator	Score
Metacritic	75/100

Review scores
Publication	Score
Destructoid	7.5/10
Edge	8/10
Eurogamer	8/10
Famitsu	32/40
Game Informer	7.25/10
GamePro	4/5
GameRevolution	B
GameSpot	7/10
GameZone	8/10
IGN	8/10
Joystiq	4.5/5
Nintendo Power	8/10
Nintendo World Report	8.5/10
Nintendojo	B+

According to the review aggregator website Metacritic, the game received "generally favorable reviews" with a score of 75/100.

Critics agreed that 3D was one of the best launch titles for the console, and showed the system's potential. IGN said that it made for a great launch title for the 3DS, while Joystiq claimed it was one of the best games available for the console. Eurogamer's review criticized the game for lacking new courses but praised it overall as "a Ridge Racer experience that could be unlike any other" by virtue of its 3D visuals. Nintendo World Report claimed it was one of the most impressive launch titles available, as did Destructoid. Multiple reviewers compared the game to the other 3DS racing game launch title Asphalt 3D, all of whom said that Ridge Racer 3D's quality and polish made it a far superior product.

The gameplay of 3D was well received. Many publications said that the game still kept the core Ridge Racer mechanics intact, such as drifting, and retained what they felt made the franchise fun. Nintendojo said it set the standard for racing games on the 3DS. Nintendo World Report described it as "a rather excellent mix of arcade and sim racing", liking its simplistic, easy-to-grasp controls. Critics also commended the game for its 3D display, which they claimed made it a technologically impressive title for the console. Nintendojo stated that the 3D effect made the game stand out, and was the definitive way to play it. Eurogamer and IGN agreed, with Eurogamer stating it made for the best portable iteration of the Ridge Racer series.

Critics applauded the game's presentation and amount of content. Game Informer complemented the amount of gameplay modes for providing additional replay value, as did Nintendojo. GamePro and GameSpot both commented on its wide selection of vehicles and courses. GameSpot also liked the courses themselves for being fun to race in. The controls were also praised by several for being responsive, with Nintendo World Report saying the game works "surprisingly well" with the system's Circle Pad. IGN applauded the game's early usage of the StreetPass function through its use of leaderboards and multiplayer ghosts. Destructoid called the game as solid, if not outstanding. 3D was also praised for its energetic soundtrack, large sense of speed, and consistent framerate.

The lack of an online multiplayer mode was met with criticism. Nintendo World Report said that it was one of the game's weakest points, while IGN stated it was a severely missed opportunity. Eurogamer found the tracks to feel like rehashes of earlier Ridge Racer games, and Joystiq claimed that the lack of an online mode might put off some players. While several criticized the graphics for being fuzzy and unimpressive, with GamePro saying they were inferior to the Ridge Racer games for the PlayStation Portable, Destructoid disagreed, writing that they were bright and colorful. Most critics claimed that 3D's gameplay, while a lot of fun, did not add much to the core gameplay of the series compared to its predecessors. Eurogamer argued that the game was lacking in the way of new content, instead borrowing many elements from its console predecessor Ridge Racer 7. Nintendojo found the in-game announcer annoying to listen to, suggesting players to turn it off as soon as they begin the game.
