= Ridge Racer 3 =

Ridge Racer 3 may refer to:

- Rave Racer, the third arcade game in the Ridge Racer series
- Rage Racer, the third console game in the Ridge Racer series
