= Ridge Racer Drift =

2010 mobile game

- Cover featuring Kamata RC410
- Developer: Namco Bandai Games
- Publishers: WW: Namco Bandai Networks Europe/EA Mobile; US: Namco America Networks
- Series: Ridge Racer
- Platforms: Java, BREW, BlackBerry OS, Windows Mobile
- Release: WW: c. January 2010; US: October 22, 2010
- Genre: Racing
- Mode: Single-player

Ridge Racer Drift is an arcade-style racing video game for mobile phones, part of the Ridge Racer series. It was developed in 2009 originally on the Java (J2ME) platform and released in early 2010. EA Mobile distributed the game in some places following a deal between them and Namco Bandai Networks Europe. BREW, BlackBerry and Windows Mobile versions were released later on all U.S. carrier networks. In July 2012 it was released alongside other Namco Bandai titles on the Nokia Store for Asha Touch phones.

== Gameplay ==
The game has the nitrous element as the regular newer Ridge Racer titles. The Grand Prix mode consists of five tours and a total of nine races Tracks are unlocked one by one and there are a total of six tracks. There is also a feature to post accomplishments online.

== Reception ==
Jon Mundy of Pocket Gamer gave the Java version 3.5 out of 5, giving praise to the powersliding mechanic.
