= Rave Racer =

1995 video game

- Developer: Namco
- Publisher: Namco
- Designers: Kenji Wakabayashi; Fumihiro Tanaka
- Composers: Shinji Hosoe; Nobuyoshi Sano
- Series: Ridge Racer
- Platform: Arcade
- Release: JP: July 1995; NA: November 1995; EU: c. 1995
- Genre: Racing
- Modes: Single-player, multiplayer

Rave Racer (Note: Japanese: レイブレーサー, Hepburn: Reibu Rēsā) is a 1995 racing video game developed and published by Namco for arcades. It is the third title in the Ridge Racer series and the follow-up to Ridge Racer and Ridge Racer 2. Rave Racer runs on Namco System 22 hardware, and could be played by two people per cabinet for up to eight players total when up to four of them were linked together. Compared to Ridge Racer 2, Rave Racer adds two new tracks as well as the ability to play the original two, various handling changes, force feedback steering, and improved car and racetrack graphics. Rave Racer was a critical and commercial success; it would be the last major arcade Ridge Racer title until Ridge Racer V: Arcade Battle (2000) as Namco focused on home consoles with titles such as R4: Ridge Racer Type 4 (1998) and Ridge Racer 64 (2000).

== Gameplay ==
A race in progress

Players control a racecar in an attempt to complete a series of races in first place while avoiding opponents. Each race is made of three laps that must be completed under a time limit; finishing a lap adds a few extra seconds to the timer.

The new tracks contain various side roads, but some of them take more time than others to complete a full lap of the track. Like Ridge Racer 2, Rave Racer also featured a new soundtrack.

== Development and release ==
A Microsoft Windows version was originally under development with support NEC's PowerVR graphics processor, and was demonstrated in early 1996. However, the game was cancelled; thus, no games in the Ridge Racer series were released for PCs until Ridge Racer Unbounded in 2012. A PlayStation version was announced later in 1996. However, was also cancelled. A standalone game, Rage Racer, was instead produced for the console.

== Legacy ==
Hamster Corporation released the game as part of the Arcade Archives series for the Nintendo Switch and PlayStation 4, as well as their Arcade Archives 2 series for the Nintendo Switch 2, PlayStation 5, Xbox Series X/S in February 2026.

== Reception ==
Reception

Review scores
Publication	Score
AllGame	3.5/5
Next Generation	4/5

In Japan, Game Machine listed Rave Racer as the most popular dedicated arcade game of September 1995. It went on to be the highest-grossing dedicated arcade game of 1996 in Japan.

A critic for Next Generation remarked that while the game makes few changes from its predecessors, those changes are important enough to make it a dramatic improvement. He found the more accurate and responsive control particularly pleasing, saying it allows players to pull off more impressive maneuvers and race without having to compensate for the controls. He also praised the fast-paced music and graphical touches. Concluding that "despite only four courses, one of which is a rehash, this racer kicks", he gave it four out of five stars.

In 1996, Next Generation listed the game at number 94 in their "Top 100 Games of All Time", citing a force-feedback steering wheel, loud speakers, a huge monitor, and a link to up to seven other units.

In 2023, Time Extension ranked the game ninth on their "Best Ridge Racer Games" list, calling it "a more refined and enjoyable experience" compared to the original Ridge Racer.
