= Ridge Racer V =

2000 video game

- North American version cover art featuring race queen Ai Fukami and the Rivelta Mercurio car
- Developer: Namco
- Publishers: Namco; PlayStation 2: NA: Namco Hometek; EU: Sony Computer Entertainment
- Director: Eiichi Saita
- Producers: Noriko Wada; Paul Guirao
- Designer: Eiichi Saita
- Programmer: Jun Nakagawa
- Composers: Kohta Takahashi; Yuu Miyake; Nobuyoshi Sano; Mijk van Dijk
- Series: Ridge Racer
- Platforms: PlayStation 2, arcade
- Release: PlayStation 2: JP: 4 March 2000; NA: 26 October 2000; EU: 24 November 2000; Arcade: JP: 28 November 2000; WW: December 2000
- Genre: Racing
- Modes: Single-player, multiplayer
- Arcade system: Namco System 246

Ridge Racer V (Note: Japanese: リッジレーサーファイブ, Hepburn: Rijji Rēsā Faibu) is a 2000 racing video game developed and published by Namco for the PlayStation 2. It was released as a launch title for the console and later followed by an arcade version subtitled Arcade Battle. Ridge Racer V is the fifth main title of the Ridge Racer series following R4: Ridge Racer Type 4 and the only one to be released on PlayStation 2 (excluding the spin-off R: Racing Evolution).

Moving away from Ridge Racer Type 4's approach, Ridge Racer V streamlined back to a simple racer without a story mode, set in fictional Ridge City based on circuits in and around the very first course introduced in Ridge Racer. Its soundtrack also features a heavier sound, directed by Namco's Kohta Takahashi and featuring other Namco composers such as Nobuyoshi Sano and Yuu Miyake, as well as external contributions from Boom Boom Satellites and Mijk van Dijk. The game also introduced a new race queen mascot, Ai Fukami, replacing Reiko Nagase.

Ridge Racer V was the highlight of PlayStation 2's original March 2000 launch. The game received a positive reception for its visuals and speedy driving experience; however, there was critique that it fell below expectations relative to the console's graphical assumptions, and divided critics for some elements such as its lack of content compared to its predecessor and noticeable jaggies. However, in retrospect, it has been considered one of the greatest arcade-style racers of all time, with praise given to its handling, environments, and challenge.

== Gameplay ==
Gameplay screenshot

In Ridge Racer V the player is a racing driver taking part in events across Ridge City in a variety of fictional cars. As with previous Ridge Racer games, the focus is on accessible and fun drift racing rather than simulating how a car behaves in the real world; as such the player is encouraged to powerslide around most corners by tapping the brake when entering the turn. There are a total of 14 courses in Ridge City, and visual filters can be applied to change the appearance. Sunny Beach and Green Field are the new names for Seaside Route 765 and Ridge City Highway respectively from the first Ridge Racer game. Ridge Racer V introduces five all new fictional vehicle manufacturers: Kamata, Danver, Rivelta, Himmel, and Soldat.

Racing on RRV is divided into different race formats. The primary mode is Grand Prix, a series of structured championships where the player races against 14 rivals across three laps in every track, including reversed courses. The completion of every Grand Prix which rewards the player with new cars. Other modes include Time Attack, a long distance endurance race called the 99 Trial, consisting of ninety-nine laps in the Sunny Beach course, and free runs on any of the unlocked courses. Two players can also take part in a split-screen race against one another. The time of day can also be chosen for most courses outside of the Grand Prix.

A special race is unlocked after the player fulfills certain requirements: it features the arcade game characters Pac-Man in a roadster and Blinky, Pinky, Inky and Clyde on scooters. Winning this race unlocks special duel class cars for use in other game modes. Duel class cars can be won by defeating bosses in the game's Duel mode after fulfilling certain requirements. After all four bosses are defeated in Duel mode, Battle Royale is unlocked, allow the player to choose any duel class cars and challenge all four bosses in a boss rush race (including ones the player have selected).

Ai Fukami serves as the game's mascot girl, replacing Reiko Nagase. The game features a fictitious radio station, Ridge City FM (frequency 76.5 MHz), providing music and commentary.

== Development ==
With Ridge Racer V, Namco went back to basics like the original Ridge Racer, Ridge Racer 2 and Rave Racer were. The decision for the single city setting was taken near the beginning of development. The member in charge has cited the 1959 film Jazz on a Summer's Day as a sort of inspiration for the in-game starting camera, as well as the direction that would lead to the fictional Ridge City FM. He created it this way so that players would also be "buying the city". Ridge City's design elements consist of road tunnels and overpasses, monorail overpasses, intersections, views of the sea beyond the buildings, a setting sun during dusk, and reflecting lights during nighttime. Some parts of the city have a more foresty environment. The appearance and sounds of airplanes and seagulls were also added to create the city's "atmosphere" on a human level. The car engine sounds were recorded on a real circuit, including some of the development staff's own vehicles. Ken Ayugai provided the voiceover for Ridge City FM which is entirely in English.

The opening intro movie, featuring Ai Fukami, is generated in real-time rather than the pre-rendered FMV in previous Ridge Racer titles. It was designed to have "wild" or "edgy" connotations and it was at this stage where the Ai character was developed. Ridge Racer V was the first home console game in the series to run at 60 frames per second. The game's lead programmer commented that the team wanted to utilise anti-aliasing "but due to various contraints we weren't able to do it as we had hoped." He further stated that designing the game was a challenge, partly due to Sony's development tools not having been completed while Ridge Racer V was in production. One staff member commented that the game had constant problems and bugs during development and that pressure was high to finish the game in time. By the end of development there had been 55 members working on it.

The game was conceived in 1999 with the aim to launch together with Sony's next generation system. Because the team did not know when the PlayStation 2 was going to come out, the schedule was changed numerous times and there were doubts that they could complete the game in time. Proposed names included Ridge Racer 2000 and R5. Core development started around May 1999. Ridge Racer V was revealed and demoed by Namco at the Tokyo Game Show in September 1999, at the same unveiling of PlayStation 2, but unlike Namco's Tekken Tag Tournament it was not playable. At the event, Namco stated that Ridge Racer V would not be available at launch, instead coming out between mid and late 2000. However, a month later Namco stated that it would indeed be a launch title for the PlayStation 2 on 4 March 2000. Post-release, the project leader thought that he was satisfied with the final product, considering the amount of time it took.

=== Music ===
Kohta Takahashi served as the sound director and lead composer of Ridge Racer V, who was previously involved as one of the composers of R4: Ridge Racer Type 4. To create an "exciting new experience", he brought in Japanese electronic music duo Boom Boom Satellites, Takeshi Ueda of The Mad Capsule Markets, and German DJ Mijk van Dijk, along with Namco composers Nobuyoshi Sano ("sanodg"), Yuu Miyake ("U") and Yoshinori Kawamoto ("Kisaburo"), to contribute music to the game. This resulted in the game having a diverse soundtrack, including genres such as trance, death metal and breakbeat. Boom Boom Satellites's "Fogbound" is the intro music, while "On the Painted Desert" plays during the ending.

Takahashi connected with external artists via Toru Nagamine of Sony Music. Van Dijk felt honored to work on the game, as was already a fan of the Ridge Racer series, as well as the first game's ability to swap the music by replacing the CD in the PlayStation, where he raced to his own music tracks. To ensure that his music fit with the game, he played R4: Ridge Racer Type 4 while composing the tracks in his studio.

The official CD soundtrack of the game was released by Sony Music Entertainment Japan in March 2000 in Japan, and was also released in Europe by Epic Records.

== Arcade ==
Ridge Racer V: Arcade Battle, the arcade port of Ridge Racer V, was announced as the first game to run on Namco's PlayStation 2-based Namco System 246 arcade platform in September 2000. The arcade version has some features such as Duel, Free Run and Pac-Man GP removed. It was the last Ridge Racer game for arcades until Pachislot Ridge Racer, which was a pachislot game released seven years later (and the last traditional racing game for that market).

== Reception ==
=== Commercial ===
In Japan, Ridge Racer V was the best-selling PlayStation 2 game in its first annual year of 2000, numbering 611,507 copies, and the 10th best-selling video game of the year on all platforms. Also in Japan, Game Machine listed the arcade version in their February 1, 2001 issue as the second most-successful dedicated arcade game of the year.

=== Critical ===
Reception

Aggregate score
Aggregator	Score
Metacritic	78/100

Review scores
Publication	Score
AllGame	3/5
CNET Gamecenter	8/10
Edge	5/10
Electronic Gaming Monthly	9/10 (Note: Three critics of Electronic Gaming Monthly gave the game each a score of 9.5/10, 9/10, and 8.5/10.)
Famitsu	9/10, 10/10, 8/10, 9/10
Game Informer	7.25/10
GameFan	(MVS) 92% (US) 88% (Note: In GameFan's viewpoint of the U.S. version, three critics gave it each a score of 78, 94, and 92.) (JP) 87% (Note: In GameFan's viewpoint of the Japanese import, two critics gave it each a score of 92, and the other gave it 78.)
GamePro	4.5/5
GameRevolution	B−
GameSpot	7.6/10
GameSpy	80%
IGN	8/10
Next Generation	3/5
PlayStation Official Magazine – UK	7/10
Official U.S. PlayStation Magazine	4.5/5

The PS2 version received "generally favorable reviews" according to the review aggregation website Metacritic. David Zdyrko of IGN liked the return to the "basic feeling of control" as the earlier games of the series and named it "one of the most visually impressive" racing games to date, but noted the graphical aliasing and flickering problems. Jeff Lundrigan of NextGen, however, said that his quote "bears repeating: 'Like its predecessors, Ridge Racer V will amaze you with flashy graphics and a great sense of speed. Unfortunately, there's not a lot of meat under the basic shell of the game.'" Andrew Reiner from Game Informer said that Ridge Racer V would be no match to Gran Turismo 2000 (which would be released as Gran Turismo 3: A-Spec). GamePro praised the realistic graphical appearance, music and noted that fans of the series "will love it." In Japan, Famitsu gave it a score of one nine, one ten, one eight and one nine for a total of 36 out of 40.

Daniel Griffiths from Official UK PlayStation 2 Magazine praised "superb handling" and "fantastic sense of speed", giving technical critique about the jaggies and the "bad" PAL conversion, concluding that it is "a great game that is let down by overly high expectations [..] this is still the best handling, best-looking console driving game so far (until GT3 and Wipeout Fusion get it together)".

==== Retrospective ====
In a 2002 article about the PlayStation 2, Edge used Ridge Racer V and Tekken Tag Tournament as examples of "soulless and derivative" launch games that were not as innovative as was expected out of the system's Emotion Engine.

In 2023, Adam Ismail of Kotaku Australia named it the best game in the series, commenting: "In fact, it might just be the greatest pure arcade racer of all time; the one, fleeting moment where driving in Ridge Racer wasn't unwieldy or mind-numbingly effortless, but just crisp, responsive and dynamic."

==== Removal of series mascot ====
Reiko Nagase, the fictional mascot of Ridge Racer who quickly achieved a great popularity and dedicated following in previous titles, had her role taken over by Ai Fukami in Ridge Racer V, causing discontent among some fans. According to Australian Station in 2000, "hordes of Reiko Nagase fans were up in arms over the decision to replace her, and even casual gamers have been heard to comment they 'liked the old one better'". New Zealand Station told how "Ridge Racer fans across the globe were in an uproar once news of this change came to light, with Reiko Vs Ai polls featuring prominently in many fansites on the internet". Official Australian PlayStation Magazine reported how one poll "has revealed 90 per cent of PlayStation owners prefer Reiko's flawless beauty to the new model". In another poll that same year, IGN's "readers overwhelmingly agreed that Reiko Nagase is the true Ridge Racer babe". Video game journalists also joined in, such as when Hyper rhetorically asked "how long it will be before they realise that the new Ridge Racer girl sucks, and bring back Reiko. 'Attention Namco: BRING BACK REIKO!!!!'" Reiko was eventually brought back in Ridge Racer 6 and Ridge Racer (PSP). In a 2006 article discussing the "legend of Reiko Nagase", 1UP.com's James Mielke wrote she "is almost as popular as the games she graces" as after Ridge Racer V "the fans welcomed their favorite race queen back with open arms. Her return made everyone feel that the Ridge Racer world was once again whole".

=== Accolades ===
The PlayStation 2 version was a runner-up for "Racing Game of 2000" in both Editors' Choice and Readers' Choice at IGN's Best of 2000 Awards, both of which went to Midnight Club: Street Racing. During the 4th Annual Interactive Achievement Awards, the Academy of Interactive Arts & Sciences nominated Ridge Racer V for the "Console Racing" award, which ultimately went to SSX.

== Legacy ==
Its successor, Ridge Racer 6, was released in 2005 for Xbox 360. Ridge Racer V was the series' final main title before the introduction of the nitrous mechanic.
