= Bird Zapper! =

2011 video game

- Developer: Namco Networks
- Publisher: Namco Bandai Games
- Platforms: iOS, Android
- Release: iPhone; March 24, 2011; Android; December 5, 2012 iPad; June 21, 2013
- Genre: Puzzle
- Mode: Single-player

Bird Zapper! is a puzzle video game developed by Namco Networks and published by Namco Bandai Games for iOS and Android in 2011–2013.

== Reception ==
Reception

Aggregate score
Aggregator	Score
Metacritic	73/100

Review scores
Publication	Score
Eurogamer	6/10
GamePro	3/5 stars
Gamezebo	60/100
IGN	8/10
Pocket Gamer	4/5 stars

The iOS version received "mixed or average reviews" according to the review aggregation website Metacritic.
