= Ridge Racer Slipstream =

2013 video game

- Developer: Invictus Games
- Publisher: Namco Bandai Games
- Series: Ridge Racer
- Platforms: iOS, Android
- Release: iOS; December 19, 2013; Android; February 20, 2014
- Genre: Racing
- Mode: Single-player

Ridge Racer Slipstream is a racing game developed by Invictus Games and published by Namco Bandai Games for iOS in 2013, and for Android in 2014.

== Reception ==
Reception

Aggregate score
Aggregator	Score
Metacritic	76/100

Review scores
Publication	Score
Destructoid	7/10
Electronic Gaming Monthly	7/10
Gamezebo	4.5/5
Jeuxvideo.com	13/20
MacLife	4/5
MeriStation	7.3/10
Pocket Gamer	4.5/5
TouchArcade	4/5
Common Sense Media	4/5
Digital Spy	4/5

The iOS version received "generally favorable reviews" according to the review aggregation website Metacritic.

Common Sense Media gave the game a score of four stars out of five, saying, "if you are able to skid with precision and are looking for a challenge, Ridge Racer Slipstream is a solid arcade racing game." Digital Spy gave it a similar score of four out of five, saying, "While the Ridge Racer series has been rather hit and miss in its last few iterations, Ridge Racer Slipstream feels like a return to form for fans of Namco's careening cars." Metro, however, gave it seven out of ten, saying, "Microtransactions rear their ugly head once again, but they're not enough to take the shine off one of the best portable Ridge Racers so far."
