= Pac-Man Fever (video game) =

2002 video game

- GameCube cover art
- Developer: Mass Media Inc.
- Publisher: Namco Hometek
- Composers: Jim Andron; Chris Tilton
- Series: Pac-Man
- Platforms: GameCube, PlayStation 2
- Release: NA: September 3, 2002
- Genre: Party
- Modes: Single-player, multiplayer

Pac-Man Fever is a 2002 party video game developed by Mass Media and published by Namco Hometek for GameCube and PlayStation 2, and exclusively released in North America. Players move about on a virtual game board, with the object of the game being to reach the end first. It allows for up to four players, featuring six characters from other Namco games to choose from: Pac-Man (Pac-Man), Astaroth (Soulcalibur), Heihachi Mishima (Tekken), Ms. Pac-Man (Pac-Man), Tiger Jackson (Tekken), and Reiko Nagase (Ridge Racer).

== Gameplay ==
There are three different types of game boards to play—Tropical, Space, and Medieval—each with its own set of minigames. After selecting a board, players can also choose to play a short, medium, or long game, each having a different number of tiles that corresponded to the length's name.

The object of the game is to get to the finish first. The game is played in rounds; each round begins with a four-player minigame, the results of which determine how many spaces each player moves forward on the board. Each tile on the board also has an effect. These include moving forward/going backward some number of steps, stealing/losing/gaining tokens, playing a single/two-player/free-for-all minigame, the ability to spend earned tokens, and a raffle game to earn redemption tickets with cherry, orange, or banana raffle tickets. When on a "store" tile, the player can spend tokens to move steps forward, move others backward, buy raffle tickets, multiply the amount of spaces moved next turn, or gamble to earn more tokens.

The three spaces before the goal space are special raffle spaces (cherry, orange, and banana, respectively). In addition to functioning as a raffle space for the first player that reaches them (and as a token space thereafter), a player must place a certain rank or better in a minigame (3rd, 2nd, and 1st, for the cherry, orange, and banana tiles, respectively) in order to progress to the next space while on these tiles. If a player attains 1st place in a minigame while on the banana space, they advance to the goal space.

Once a player has reached the end, the game is over and players will receive redemption tickets based on how far they got on the board. These can then be used to buy each minigame separately, which can be played in short tournaments outside the main game. Alternatively, once all minigames have been bought, the player can let the tickets tally up to see their overall high score.

== Development ==
On June 20, 2022, a developer confirmed that Namco tried to get the rights to the Pac-Man Fever song for use in the game, but were ultimately unsuccessful.

== Reception ==
Reception

Aggregate score
Aggregator	Score
Metacritic	(GCN) 54/100 (PS2) 47/100

Review scores
Publication	Score
GameSpot	5.2/10
GameSpy	3/5
GameZone	6/10
IGN	4.9/10
Nintendo World Report	7/10

Pac-Man Fever received mixed reviews. Review aggregator Metacritic gave the GameCube version a 54 out of 100, indicating "mixed or average reviews", while the PS2 version received a 47 out of 100, indicating "generally unfavorable reviews".

Matt Casamassina of IGN gave the GameCube version a 4.9/10 and the PlayStation 2 version a 4.5/10. While he praised the sound, he criticized the gameplay and graphics. Ryan Davis of GameSpot gave both versions of the game a 5.2/10, disliking the lack of variety in the minigames and the slow pace on the boards. 1UP.com called the mini-games lacking in "creative interactivity", concluding: "the only 'fever' I experienced was a spasm brought on by my boredom." GamePro called it "a dismal showing" and a "shameless Mario Party rip-off" devoid of "even a hint of fun multiplayer competition," and Electronic Gaming Monthly called it "a snore-fest".

Game Informer gave the PlayStation 2 version a 7.5/10 and the GameCube version a 7.3/10, praising the animation and the presence of a plot while remarking that the game will "fade into obscurity."
