= Cellius =

Japanese video game developer

- Native name: 株式会社セリウス
- Type: Kabushiki gaisha Joint venture
- Industry: Video games
- Founded: June 3, 2007; 19 years ago
- Defunct: February 29, 2012
- Headquarters: Shibuya, Tokyo, Japan
- Key people: Ken Kutaragi (CEO)
- Products: Software
- Owner: Namco Bandai Games; (51%); Sony Computer Entertainment; (49%)
- Website: http://www.cellius.jp/

Cellius Inc. (Note: Japanese: 株式会社セリウス, Hepburn: Kabushiki-gaisha Seriusu) was a Japanese video game developer and publisher headquartered in Shibuya, Tokyo, founded in 2007 as a joint venture between Sony and Bandai Namco Holdings. The aim of the company was to assist in helping Sony compete with Microsoft and Nintendo. Sony hoped that the company would make up for the losses it made during quarter two of its financial year. Ken Kutaragi was announced as CEO. Bandai Namco Holdings held 51% of the company, and Sony held 49%. The company planned to use Sony's Cell microprocessor, the heart of the PlayStation 3, for PlayStation 3 games and games for mobile phones and personal computers. Its video game projects were Misato Katsuragi's Reporting Plan on the PlayStation 3 and Ridge Racer on the PlayStation Vita.
