= Ridge Racer Unbounded =

2012 video game

- North American PlayStation 3 cover art
- Developer: Bugbear Entertainment
- Publisher: Namco Bandai Games (Note: Released under the Namco brand name)
- Producers: Joonas Laakso, Kimmo Kari
- Designer: Karri Kiviluoma
- Programmer: Fred Sundvik
- Composers: Hiroshi Okubo, Akitaka Tohyama, Rio Hamamoto, Shinji Hosoe, Ayako Saso, Nobuyoshi Sano
- Series: Ridge Racer
- Platforms: Microsoft Windows; PlayStation 3 Xbox 360
- Release: NA: 27 March 2012; NA: 29 March 2012 (PC); EU: 30 March 2012; AU: 5 April 2012
- Genre: Racing
- Modes: Single-player, multiplayer

Ridge Racer Unbounded (Note: Japanese: リッジレーサー アンバウンデッド, Hepburn: Rijji Rēsā Anbaundeddo) is a 2012 racing video game developed by Bugbear Entertainment and published by Namco Bandai Games. It was released for Microsoft Windows, PlayStation 3 and Xbox 360. It is the eighth installment of the Ridge Racer franchise following Ridge Racer 7, the first mainline title not to be developed by Namco nor released in Japan, and the first in the series overall to be released on Windows. Unbounded is also the most recent game in the series to be released on home consoles as its successors only focused on handheld devices.

Unbounded marks a departure from the traditional Ridge Racer drifting style, and moved to a more combat-oriented and destructive style, similar to the Burnout series and Split/Second, as well as implementing customizations. The game received average reviews.

== Gameplay ==
Ridge Racer Unbounded is a racing game, and it includes many staple mechanics of the genre, such as drifting, drafting, and catching air. However, it eschews much of the gameplay of Ridge Racer in favour of carving out its own identity.

In Unbounded, you race down courses with destructible objects and environments, such as low walls, concrete support beams, statues, and kiosks. These track features can be driven through, enabling players to do collateral damage.

During races, players can fill a power meter by completing certain manoeuvres. When the metre fills, targets become highlighted on the course. Players can trigger the power metre to activate a speed boost, which they can use to crash through the targets or take out opponent racers.

Players can choose from several race types. These include

- Domination, in which the player tries to take out opponent racers and do a lot of collateral damage,
- Frag Attack, in which the player tries to take out as many opponents as possible,
- Shindo Racing, in which most of the combat and destructive elements are removed,
- Time Trials, in which the player races through a stunt course, and
- Drift Attack, in which the player drifts to gain time extensions.

The game can be played alone or with others via online multiplayer. The game offers a level editor, allowing players to build custom cities with several courses and share them with others online. Players can set custom challenges for their custom courses and share and compare scores with others.

Aside from trying to win races, Unbounded incentivizes point collection. Players can receive points for finishing a race in top three, taking out opponents, doing collateral damage, triggering events, and earning awards. Points unlock new races, bestow XP, and let players rank up. This, in turn, unlocks new cars and components for the level editor.

== Plot ==
Set in a fictional city called Shatter Bay, racers gather to compete in no-rules, all-out street races. Competing for money and superiority in fast-paced blasts through the streets dodging traffic and tearing through any obstacles that get in their way. A mysterious team led by a Japanese Hashiriya master, called "The Unbounded", appears playing a major role in the racing activity throughout Shatter Bay.

== Development ==
Ridge Racer Unbounded offers a number of changes that depart from traditional Ridge Racer gameplay. Additions to the game include the ability to design and share tracks and a new emphasis on vehicular combat.

While Unbounded was originally scheduled for release in North America and Europe in early March 2012, it was delayed just before the planned release, as Namco Bandai wanted to allow more time "to pack the disc with features that will truly make the game sing". The game was released in March the same year in North America and Europe and later in April in Australia on all platforms. The game was never released in Japan. Despite this, it seems to borrow inspiration from an earlier Namco game, Critical Velocity (クリティカルベロシティ, Kuritikaruberoshiti), also a vehicular combat video game, released in 2005 only in Japan.

=== Ridge Racer Driftopia ===
A free-to-play version called Ridge Racer Driftopia was made. A beta version was released for Windows and PlayStation 3 in August 2013. Driftopia was later cancelled, with the beta servers shut down on 15 August 2014.

== Reception ==
Reception

Aggregate score
Aggregator	Score		
Aggregator	PC	PS3	Xbox 360
Metacritic	72/100	72/100	71/100

Review scores
Publication	Score		
Publication	PC	PS3	Xbox 360
Destructoid	N/A	N/A	5.5/10
Edge	N/A	N/A	9/10
Eurogamer	N/A	N/A	8/10
Game Informer	N/A	6.75/10	6.75/10
GameRevolution	N/A	N/A	2.5/5
GameSpot	8/10	8/10	8/10
GameTrailers	N/A	N/A	7.6/10
GameZone	N/A	8.5/10	N/A
IGN	8.5/10	8.5/10	8.5/10
Official Xbox Magazine (US)	N/A	N/A	6.5/10
PC Gamer (UK)	80%	N/A	N/A
PlayStation: The Official Magazine	N/A	7/10	N/A
The Daily Telegraph	N/A	N/A	4/5
Digital Spy	N/A	N/A	3/5

Ridge Racer Unbounded received "average" reviews on all platforms according to the review aggregation website Metacritic.

411Mania gave the PlayStation 3 version a score of eight out of ten, calling it "a welcome addition that fans of the genre should not ignore". The Digital Fix gave the Xbox 360 version a score of eight out of ten: "Everyone involved deserves a huge pat on the back for Ridge Racer Unbounded - Namco for having the stomach and recognition for change and Bugbear for reinventing an aging and tired series". The Guardian gave the same console version a similar score of four stars out of five, saying that its frustrating moments "are far outweighed by the deeply satisfying ones. It's anarchic, well designed, thrilling to behold and will put a massive grin on any true petrol-head's face". The Daily Telegraph likewise gave the same console version four stars out of five: "The problem with Unbounded is that it doesn't seem comfortable sharing its secrets with you. It's called Ridge Racer, it looks like Burnout, and anyone who has played an arcade racer will, not unreasonably, expect a certain handling model...Unbounded is not that game".

However, Digital Spy gave the same console version three stars out of five, saying that it "lacks the sparkle of games such as Split/Second or Burnout. The destruction elements feel a bit weak, the cars control poorly at times and the computer AI is truly merciless. The biggest problem, though, is the lack of a proper tutorial in the game, a sure-fire way to alienate many players almost instantly". Destructoid gave the Xbox 360 version 5.5 out of ten, praising its "surprisingly good map editor", but criticizing the level design and the poor lighting conditions during sunset scenes, stating that "the lighting makes driving much harder than it needs to be", and suggesting players play the 2010 Need for Speed: Hot Pursuit game instead.
