= Ridge Racer 2 =

1994 video game

- North American arcade flyer
- Developer: Namco
- Publisher: Namco
- Composers: Shinji Hosoe, Ayako Saso, Nobuyoshi Sano, Takayuki Aihara
- Series: Ridge Racer
- Platform: Arcade
- Release: JP: 8 June 1994; NA: August 1994
- Genre: Racing
- Modes: Single-player, multiplayer
- Arcade system: Namco System 22

Ridge Racer 2 (Note: Japanese: リッジレーサー2, Hepburn: Rijji Rēsā Tsu) is a 1994 racing video game developed and published by Namco for arcades. A sequel to Ridge Racer, it features more quality-of-life changes than substantial new content. One major addition is the ability to play with up to eight human players.

The game would be followed up by Rave Racer. The PlayStation version of Ridge Racer was followed up by Ridge Racer Revolution, which inherited Ridge Racer 2's soundtrack.

== Gameplay ==
The gameplay is very much like that of the original. However, unlike the vanilla version of Ridge Racer (which was a single-player game), in Ridge Racer 2, up to eight players can play simultaneously when four two-player cabinets are linked together. A player's number determines their car.

There also are six new songs, including remixed ones from the original, that can be selected with the gear shifter at the start. The enormous television screen above the entrance to the first tunnel shows footage from Namco's 1979 title Galaxian (in the original, it was playing Mappy). There is a rear-view mirror at the top of the screen, so a player can see other cars coming from behind. There is also a change in daylight from day to night (a car driven into the track's tunnel during the day will come out the other end at night).

== Reception ==
=== Commercial ===
In Japan, Game Machine listed Ridge Racer 2 on their August 15, 1994 issue as being the fourth most-successful upright/cockpit arcade game of the month. In North America, RePlay reported the game to be the fourth most-popular deluxe arcade game at the time. Play Meter also listed the title to be the thirty-seventh most-popular arcade game at the time.

=== Critical ===
Next Generation reviewed the arcade version of the game, rating it four stars out of five, and stated that "eight-user multi-player link-up has been added to enable Ridge Racer 2 to compete on equal footing with Sega's Daytona USA and Namco's new Ace Driver." In 2023, Time Extension ranked the game 11th on their "Best Ridge Racer Games" list.
