= Anna Kournikova's Smash Court Tennis =

1998 video game

- Developer: Namco
- Publishers: JP: Namco; EU: Sony Computer Entertainment
- Platform: PlayStation
- Release: JP: November 12, 1998; EU: June 18, 1999
- Genre: Sports
- Modes: Single player, multiplayer

Anna Kournikova's Smash Court Tennis, known in Japan as Smash Court 2 (スマッシュコート2, Sumasshu Kōto Tsū), is a tennis video game developed by Namco for the PlayStation. It is the second title in Namco's Smash Court series of games. The game was released in Japan in November 1998 and was later released in Europe in 1999, featuring the likeness of professional tennis player Anna Kournikova.

== Gameplay ==
Anna Kournikova's Smash Court Tennis is a simple tennis game which can be played with up to four players. The game features various modes such as a training mode, Street Tennis, which is played on street courts, and Smash Tennis, in which players fight against each other using explosive tennis balls. Along with various tennis characters, players can unlock other characters from various Namco games, including Richard Miller and Sherudo Garo from Time Crisis, Heihachi Mishima, Yoshimitsu and Eddy Gordo from Tekken 3, Pac-Man and Reiko Nagase from Ridge Racer Type 4.

== Reception ==
Reception

Review score
Publication	Score
The Sydney Morning Herald	3.5/5
