= R: Racing Evolution =

2003 video game

- European GameCube cover art featuring protagonist Rena Hayami and the BMW McLaren F1 GTR
- Developer: Namco
- Publishers: JP: Namco; NA: Namco Hometek; EU: Electronic Arts
- Director: Hideo Teramoto
- Designers: James Lisle; Kazuya Maruyama; Hisashi Kawamura; Masaya Kobayashi; Kazuo Yamamoto; Fumihiro Tanaka
- Programmer: Satoru Ouchi
- Artists: Yoshinori Wagatsuma; Kiyotake Fujii; Shoji Imamura
- Writer: Masaya Kobayashi
- Composers: Yuu Miyake; Hiroshi Okubo; Akitaka Tohyama
- Series: Ridge Racer
- Platforms: GameCube, PlayStation 2, Xbox
- Release: JP: 27 November 2003; NA: 9 December 2003; EU: 2 April 2004
- Genre: Sim racing
- Modes: Single-player, multiplayer

R: Racing Evolution, released as R: Racing in PAL territories, is a 2003 sim racing video game developed and published by Namco. It was released on the GameCube, PlayStation 2 and Xbox. It is a spin-off of the Ridge Racer series, released over three years after Ridge Racer V; unlike the main series, R: Racing Evolution is a simulator or simcade, and uses licensed racecars rather than fictional vehicles. The game centers around the character Rena Hayami in her career as a professional racing driver, and her rivalry with veteran driver Gina Cavalli, in a cinematic and story-driven plot. It received generally mixed reviews from critics.

== Gameplay ==
Gameplay screenshot featuring the Toyota MR2 in a race at Suzuka Circuit East

R: Racing Evolution is a racing game featuring over 33 licensed cars from various motorsports series (such as the JGTC, WRC, and the 24 Hours of Le Mans), and in-depth configuration options such as adjusting the brakes, front-wheel stabilizers, and car weight. Other features concerning gameplay include drifts, Nitro adjustments, and individual classes and attributes for every car. The game also features a system referred to as the pressure meter, a gauge that is displayed above every car which fills up as the player gets closer to a rival car; the higher the meter, the greater the likelihood that the AI will make a critical mistake. Most of the time, when the player overtakes an NPC, it will trigger a dialog, complimenting your movements, and it might also trigger a dialog when the pressure meter is full/half-full, with the opponent slowly feeling the pressure, ending up, most likely, screaming out of control.

The game offers a story mode where the player follows the racing career of Rena Hayami as she struggles to deal with the busy life of a professional race car driver and the politics of the sport. The mode features 14 chapters, in which the player earns new cars, RP points for new purchases, and views pre-rendered cutscenes preceding every chapter. Other modes include the usual racing game fare: single races, time attacks, a versus mode, and car customization.

== Plot ==
Rena Hayami is introduced as a Japanese ambulance driver. On one afternoon, she responds to an accident at Twin Ring Motegi. Pressed for time, Rena pushes her driving skills to the limit in order to deliver the injured racer to the hospital. Along for the ride with his injured team member, the former racing engineer and now team manager Stephan Garnier is impressed enough to offer Rena a chance to become a racing driver herself. She accepts and joins Stephan's team, oblivious to the fact that the team is sponsored by a shadowy corporation called GVI, which determines the placing of the racers in the race, as shown in one of the chapters, when Rena (the player) is forced to place second, not first. At first, Rena benefits from the company's influence and is given equipment and opportunities to race in major events. However, she quickly develops a bitter rivalry with independent Spanish veteran racer Gina Cavalli. It is later revealed that Gina despises GVI, and her contempt for the company spills over to Rena, whom Gina considers to be their pawn. Later, when the first rally race chapter was introduced, Stephan's team mechanic Eddie is introduced, and it is revealed that Stephan was once a very good team manager until an accident occurred involving one of his racers, he was forced to resign. Towards the end of Rena's rookie season, Eddie comes up with a plan to leave GVI with Stephan and Rena. Months later, they form a new team without GVI's influence and Gina finds new respect for Rena, and the two become friends while continuing their rivalry on the racetrack.

== Development ==
R:Racing Evolution was announced at E3 2003.

The soundtrack of the game was composed by Yuu Miyake, Hiroshi Okubo, and Akitaka Tohyama, with additional contributions by Koji Nakagawa, Satoru Kosaki, and Keiki Kobayashi. Almost 11 years after the game's initial release, it was released as R: Racing Evolution Direct Audio by SuperSweep Records on 19 September 2014.

== Release ==
Each territory received slightly different cover art that changed the car depicted to tailor it for each market. The Japanese release features a De Tomaso Pantera GT5. The North American release features a Dodge Viper. The European release features a McLaren F1 GTR.

The GameCube version of the game came bundled with Nintendo's Pac-Man Vs. in all territories.

== Reception ==
Reception

Aggregate score
Aggregator	Score		
Aggregator	GameCube	PS2	Xbox
Metacritic	67/100	66/100	67/100

Review scores
Publication	Score		
Publication	GameCube	PS2	Xbox
Edge	4/10	N/A	N/A
Electronic Gaming Monthly	5.67/10	5.67/10 (Note: Three critics of Electronic Gaming Monthly gave all console versions each a score of 6.5/10, 6/10, and 4/10.)	5.67/10
Eurogamer	5/10	5/10	N/A
Famitsu	32/40	32/40	32/40
Game Informer	7/10	7/10	N/A
GameRevolution	C	C	C
GameSpot	6.6/10	6.6/10	6.6/10
GameSpy	N/A	3/5	N/A
IGN	6.8/10	6.8/10	6.8/10
Nintendo Power	4.1/5	N/A	N/A
Nintendo World Report	8/10	N/A	N/A
Official U.S. PlayStation Magazine	N/A	4/5	N/A
Official Xbox Magazine (US)	N/A	N/A	8.5/10
X-Play	N/A	3/5	N/A

The game received "average" reviews on all platforms according to the review aggregation website Metacritic. In Japan, Famitsu gave it a score of all four eights on each platform for a total of 32 out of 40.

The gameplay was described as a compromise between simulation and arcade, one of the most notable criticisms being the poor driving physics due to the sheer difficulty in handling each and every vehicle regardless of tuning setups. The story was considered interesting enough to keep the player interested in an otherwise dull series of races. Graphically, the game was more or less identical on all platforms. On the other hand, the game was found lacking in comparison to other racing titles on the Xbox. Michael "Major Mike" Weigand of GamePro said of the Xbox version, "Solid play mechanics, combined with an in-depth story mode (complete with cinemas) and other play facets, give R a solid edge over the competition." (Note: GamePro gave the Xbox version two 4.5/5 scores for graphics and fun factor, 3.5/5 for sound, and 4/5 for control.) However, GameZone gave the PlayStation 2 version 6.5 out of 10, calling it "a solid, but very vanilla racer [sic]."
