= NebulasRay =

1994 video game

- Developer: Namco
- Publisher: Namco
- Designer: Masahiro Kimoto
- Artists: Hideaki Ito; Kimiyo Amano
- Composers: Masahiro Fukuzawa; Takayuki Ishikawa
- Platform: Arcade
- Release: JP: March 1994; EU: 1994
- Genre: Scrolling shooter
- Modes: Single-player, multiplayer

NebulasRay (Note: Japanese: ネビュラスレイ, Hepburn: NebyurasuRei) is a 1994 vertically scrolling shooter video game developed and published by Namco for arcades. Players control a starship named the Fighting Ray, navigating through levels to eradicate an intergalactic organization known as the Master Force. It is noteworthy for its usage of pre-rendering, where 3D models are converted into 2D sprites, creating the illusion of a 3D world.

NebulasRay was developed by the same team of Namco employees that created the vertical shooter Fighter & Attacker (1992). They chose to create another shooter because of their dissatisfaction with the quality of shooters at the time. The game was well-received, particularly for its graphical style. Reviewers also praised its gameplay, array of weapons, and soundtrack. Some felt it was hindered by its high difficulty level and similarity to other games.

== Gameplay ==
The player exchanging shots with an enemy battleship.

NebulasRay is a vertically scrolling shooter. The story revolves around an ongoing war between humans and an intergalactic organization named the Master Force. After the Master Force destroy the fictional planet Marinarc, the base of operations of the resistance, a prototype starfighter called the Fighting Ray is deployed in hopes of destroying the Master Force once and for all.

The player controls the Fighting Ray through six scrolling stages that increase in difficulty. In these stages, the objective is to destroy constantly-moving formations of enemies while avoiding a collision with them and their projectiles, as well as stage obstacles like asteroids. Stages conclude in a boss fight where players must destroy the weak point of an enemy battleship, such as its core or turret guns.

Power-ups are awarded by destroying capsule-shaped enemies or other larger enemies found throughout each stage. These upgrade the power of the Fighting Ray's weapons, including a spread shot, a "grow shot" that increases in size, a lock-on laser, and a four-way shot. Several of these weapons only last for a certain amount of time. There are other items that will increase the player's score when collected in succession. The Fighting Ray also begins with three superbombs that clear the screen of enemies when fired.

== Development and release ==
The characters in NebulasRay were created as 3D models and then converted into 2D sprites.

NebulasRay was developed by the same team of Namco employees that designed the scrolling shooter Fighter & Attacker (1992). They chose to create another shooter because they were unsatisfied with the quality of the genre at the time and want to improve on faults present in their previous game. The development of NebulasRay began in 1993 and lasted for 8 months. It was programmed for the Namco NB-1 arcade system, which lacked the ability to produce 3D graphics. As a workaround, the team used pre-rendering to convert 3D models into 2D sprites, thus creating the illusion of a 3D game. The idea was suggested by a staff member that thought it would make the game more realistic than what sprite-based games could accomplish. Namco created the models on Macintosh computers using the same rendering and texture-mapping techniques it used for Ridge Racer (1993) and Cyber Sled (1993). The soundtrack was composed by Masahiro Fukuzawa and Takayuki Ishikawa, who wanted its music to feel empowering and thrilling for players.

NebulasRay was released in Japan in March 1994. In advertising material, Namco highlighted its pre-rendered graphics and two-player simultaneous play. It was released midway in the year in North America and was later demonstrated at the American Amusement Machine Association (AAMA) tradeshow in Illinois. Victor Entertainment released its soundtrack in July as the thirteenth volume in its Namco Game Sound Express series. Original NebulasRay arcade boards are now rare and collectible.

Hamster Corporation released the game as part of their Arcade Archives series for the Nintendo Switch and PlayStation 4 on May 15, 2025.

== Reception ==
Critics applauded NebulasRay for its unique visual style. A reviewer for Electronic Gaming Monthly commended the quality of its sprite-layering techniques and for having some of the best graphics in a scrolling shooter yet: "If you have been waiting for a really great shooter, your collective prayers have been answered in spades!" A Consoles + writer was similarly impressed, and believed its creative use of 3D and fast-pacing would help keep the shooter genre alive. Staff for Micom BASIC and Shooting Maker were enthralled with the quality of its graphics and presentation. One found it to be as impressive as those in Ridge Racer (1993), while another said it made other shooters look dated in comparison.

The gameplay was liked for its action and intensiveness. Micom BASIC in particular was fond of its pacing while Shooting Maker showed appreciation towards its innovation and sense of power while playing. The difficulty received criticism from Consoles + though it was seen as a minor setback. The magazine praised Namco for balancing impressive visuals with intense and enjoyable gameplay. Some felt it was too similar to other shooters, but its visual style helped remedy this. NebulasRay also received praise for its array of weapons, soundtrack, and cinematic atmosphere. Retro listed it as being one of the best shooters of all time in 2006, with its intense gameplay and technological abilities being its strong points. Multiple publications have shown interest in the game being re-released for modern platforms.
