= Kimara Lovelace =

American singer

- Origin: Somerville, New Jersey, US
- Genres: Dance
- Years active: 1996–present
- Label: Armada

Kimara Lovelace is a female dance music vocalist from Somerville, New Jersey who placed three songs in the Top 10 of the Hot Dance Music/Club Play chart in the late nineties. "Circles" spent a week at #1 in 1998. That same year, Kimara performed vocals on the songs "Ridge Racer -One More Win-" and "Urban Fragments" for the video game R4: Ridge Racer Type 4. Her follow-up single to "Circles" was "When Can Our Love Begin". Kimara also worked with music producer Lil Louis releasing a single "Misery" in 2000. Her other songs "Only You" charted at #5 and "I Luv You More" charted at #9 on Billboard Dance Club Song Play chart.

== See also ==
- List of number-one dance hits (United States)
- List of artists who reached number one on the US Dance chart
