= Reiko Nagase =

Fictional video game character

- Ridge Racer character
- Reiko Nagase in promotional material for R4: Ridge Racer Type 4
- First appearance: Rage Racer (1996)
- Designed by: Kei Yoshimizu

In-universe information
- Origin: Tokyo, Japan
- Nationality: Japanese

Reiko Nagase (Japanese: 永瀬麗子, Hepburn: Nagase Reiko) is a character in Bandai Namco's Ridge Racer series. Originally created by artist Kei Yoshimizu for the 1995 video game Rage Racer, she was an expanded role in later titles as a mascot for the series due to how well she contrasted against the series' racing element, becoming a mascot for the company. While she has appeared in almost every game since, her exclusion from Ridge Racer V drew significant backlash, resulting in her return in the following titles.

Since her introduction, Reiko was well received, praised for both her character and the physical attractiveness of her character design. She has also been seen as an important part of Sony Entertainment's PlayStation brand, featured in a tech demo as part of the PlayStation 2's reveal. However, some have also criticized her usage in games, seeing it as sexualization of women in games or relegating female characters to the background compared to their counterparts.

== Conception and design ==
The character was designed for the Bandai Namco racing video game series Ridge Racer by artist Kei Yoshimizu. Introduced in Rage Racer, she was initially intended to act solely as a "number girl", a person who displays the current lap number at the start of said lap. However, the development team noticed how pretty she was and felt she made a good contrast to the game's tough racing element, and as a result, made her a mascot for the series. Now named Reiko Nagase, later games in the series gave her an expanded role, particularly R4: Ridge Racer Type 4.

Reiko appears as a slender Asian woman with long legs and brunette hair in a pixie cut hairstyle. She stands 165 centimetres (5 ft 5 in), and has measurements of 85-58-86 cm (33-23-34 in). While she has several outfits, she is often depicted in a white tube dress with matching shoes and elbow-length gloves. The dress itself features a thin red arrow pattern towards the bottom of the skirt.

According to an article in Incite Video Gaming, Yoshimizu had stated he had been unable to find a face model for Reiko, and resorted to scanning his own face after shaving and plucking his eyebrows. The story was later echoed in other publications such as Edge magazine. Yoshimizu later clarified in an interview with Time Extension that when asked by Incite if her face was created without any real-life references, he responded "I used my own face as a reference". But in this context, he meant he had utilized his face strictly as an anatomical guide, and that her face was created from scratch.

== Appearances ==
Reiko is a Japanese woman from Tokyo, and was first introduced in the 1996 racing game Rage Racer, the fourth title in Ridge Racer series. She returned in subsequent titles, where she was given a name and expanded role up as the series' race queen character until Ridge Racer V, where she was replaced with another character named Ai Fukami designed by artist Yukie Matsuo. The development team saw the game as a new beginning due to it appearing on the PlayStation 2, and wanted to also illustrate "a woman seen through a woman's eyes". Replacing Reiko proved to be a controversial decision however, and after fan outcry, including a petition, she returned for subsequent entries in the series.

In non-racing titles, she is prominently featured in a Ridge Racer-themed pachislot, along with a PlayStation 2 port of the machine. Outside of the Ridge Racer series, Reiko has appeared in several other games, including Anna Kournikova's Smash Court Tennis, both the Super World Stadium series and Professional Baseball Famisuta 2011, Namco Wonder Classic, Pac-Man Fever, and Taiko no Tatsujin: V Version.

== Promotion and reception ==
Reiko's replacement for Ridge Racer V, Ai Fukami (pictured), was criticized and seen as more sexualized by comparison.

Reiko's image has been used to significantly promote the Ridge Racer series through media such as television commercials, computer wallpapers, and pinup calendars. Promotional models dressed as the character have also been featured at gaming industry events such as E3 and Nintendo World. Several figures of Reiko have also been produced, such as a gashapon figure as part of the "Namco Gals Collection" toyline. In other media, her image has been used to promote soundtracks for the Ridge Racer games, including Ridge Racers Direct Audio and Ridge Racer 20th Anniversary Remix. She has also appeared in promotions related to Sony Entertainment's PlayStation brand. In 1999, she was featured in Namco's E3 PlayStation 2 pre-launch real-time tech demo "Ridge Racer Girl" as part of the console's debut to the general public, with the demo receiving significant praise. In other game promotions, a character using Reiko's likeness appears in Sony's Astro Bot, while a poster of her appears as an in-game decoration for their game Mainichi Issho.

Reiko has been well received since her debut, with the staff of Next Generation magazine stating that "few things" represented Namco's success as a company more than the character. Australian Station's staff meanwhile described her as a symbol tied to the original PlayStation, citing her popularity and "wholesome sexiness" while voicing particular praise for her Type 4 appearance. Chinese website Games.sina.com.cn described her as a virtual idol, calling her presence rare in the racing car genre both due to her design and role as a driver in the series, and how players had grown attached to her character. GamesRadar+'s Justin Towell meanwhile suggested that much of the character's popularity arose from her physical characterization instead of aiming for photorealism, noting that despite console hardware issues in rendering 3D models "She is sensational."

Her omission from Ridge Racer V caused an outcry from series fans. While the staff of Official U.S. PlayStation Magazine mocked the reaction by suggesting players had "somehow forgotten the girls they see in video games aren't actually real people", they also celebrated her return to the series with the PSP Ridge Racer title, calling her "the best race queen" unlike "those skanks who replaced her." Arcade magazine featured a two-page spread of Ai by comparison, and expressed their enjoyment in how her introduction brought a sense of competition for the role of the series' mascot. The staff of Australian Station meanwhile considered her replacement in Ridge Racer V as a change that single-handedly represented the increase in sexualization gaming had steadily seen. Describing Reiko as an "innocent, wholesome looking girl-next-door" compare to the "more wordly" Ai they felt was designed to emphasize sex appeal, the staff further emphasized how little Ai was used in the title and questioned why the change was even done in the first place.

James Mielke of 1UP.com expressed surprise at how popular the character had remained through the years, noting her as one of gaming's first three dimensional female video game characters, predating Lara Croft. Examining the reasons, he suggested that a lot of the appeal may be due to her design such as her long legs or cheerful demeanor presented in the games. Elaborating on the latter, he felt this provided the Ridge Racer series with something other racing game franchises lacked, providing character to the titles with a touch of personality and charm, and that her return to the series after Ridge Racer V helped the series feel whole again for many fans. The latter sentiment was shared by the staff of PSM, stating that despite only being seen in part in the games her presence and style was always there, and alongside Ai helped define the series with "their unmatched style and grace."

Meanwhile, her role in Type 4 received praise for how it expanded upon her character and gave her a private life to view. The staff of Inside enjoyed how Reiko acted as a "hidden heroine" in the title, sending the player messages of encouragement during the game's story mode if proper conditions were met. They found this to be a rare moment provided by racing games, adding an element of human drama to the title and allowing her to shine. Universitas Islam Negeri Raden Mas Said Surakarta Associate Professor Luthfie Arguby Purnomo also discussed this aspect of her character, citing her as an example of how a mascot in a game can impact the micronarratives in games for characters. Describing her as having a cheerful personality and established as a "cyberbabe", he felt her presence was seen as vital to the games as it helped provide a reward in the form of fan service that encouraged engagement from players who would hope doing so would lead to interactions with her.

However, Bath Spa University Professor of Digital Media James Newman in his book Videogames was critical of Reiko's usage in the games. Calling her "the epitome outmoded and outdated stereotyping" due to her usage being primarily in promotional material with limited involvement in the games, he felt she served as an example of how female characters are often relegated to the background compared to their male or even non-human counterparts, in this case the cars in the Ridge Racer series. He referenced her again in the book Teaching Videogames, suggesting that readers avoid using a character in such a manner as it could be considered off-putting to female viewers, and posed the question to consider issues that may arise from such representation of women in media. Barbara Connell in the book Exploring the Media also criticized Reiko's usage, describing her as heavily sexualized and an example of how female characters are often used as props or bystanders in games.
