= Mijk van Dijk =

- Birth name: Michael van den Nieuwendijk
- Born: 11 October 1963 (age 61); Geesthacht, Schleswig-Holstein, Germany
- Origin: Berlin, Germany
- Genres: Trance, techno, house, ambient
- Occupation(s): musician, producer, DJ
- Instrument: synthesizer
- Years active: 1992–present
- Website: www.mijkvandijk.de

Michael van den Nieuwendijk (born 11 October 1963), known professionally as Mijk van Dijk, is a German DJ and electronic music producer from Berlin. Scooter mentions van Dijk in their 1994 song Hyper Hyper, during which lead singer H.P. Baxxter reads out the name of numerous DJs.
