= Ridge Racer (1993 video game) =

Racing video game

- North American arcade flyer
- Developer: Namco
- Publisher: Namco; PlayStation: NA/EU: Sony Computer Entertainment (Note: North American Greatest Hits release published by Namco Hometek.)
- Producer: Toru Iwatani
- Composers: Shinji Hosoe; Nobuyoshi Sano; Ayako Saso
- Series: Ridge Racer
- Platforms: Arcade, PlayStation, mobile phone, Zeebo
- Release: Arcade: JP: October 1993; NA: 30 November 1993; UK: January 1994; EU: 26 April 1994; PlayStation: JP: 3 December 1994; NA: 9 September 1995; EU: 29 September 1995
- Genre: Racing
- Mode: Single-player
- Arcade system: Namco System 22

Ridge Racer (Note: Japanese: リッジレーサー, Hepburn: Rijji Rēsā) is a 1993 racing video game developed and published by Namco for arcades. It is the first installment in Namco's Ridge Racer series. It was released initially on the Namco System 22 arcade system board and ported to the PlayStation home console in 1994. Ridge Racer was notable for being the first arcade video game with 3D texture-mapped graphics, with its System 22 hardware capable of texture mapping and Gouraud shading.

Development took eight months, and the game is based on a trend among Japanese car enthusiasts, which involves racing on mountain roads while drifting around corners. The first home version was released in Japan in 1994 as a launch title for the PlayStation; the versions for North America and Europe were released in 1995, also as a launch title for both regions. While an accurate conversion, its frame rate was halved to 30 per second (25 for PAL) due to PlayStation hardware limitations. Ridge Racer played a major role in establishing the new system and gave it an early edge over its nearest competitor, the Sega Saturn; it was considered a rival to Sega's Daytona USA.

Ridge Racer received critical acclaim; journalists praised its 3D texture-mapped graphics, audio, drifting mechanics, and arcade racing gameplay, although some were critical of the lack of strong artificial intelligence and a multiplayer mode. It has retrospectively been considered one of the greatest video games of all time. It was followed by an arcade update in 1994, Ridge Racer 2, and a fully-fledged sequel, Rave Racer, in 1995; the PlayStation received a separate sequel, Ridge Racer Revolution, released in 1995 in Japan, and in 1996 in North America and PAL regions. The soundtrack was remixed and released on the Namco Game Sound Express Vol. 11 album.

== Gameplay ==
A race in progress, PlayStation version

Players choose a course, a car, a transmission (automatic or six-speed manual), and a song. The cars' specifications vary: some have a high top speed, others have better acceleration or handling, and some present a balance of the three. Certain cars are named after other Namco games such as Solvalou, Mappy, Bosconian, Nebulasray, and Xevious. The racetrack can be observed from a first-person perspective or, for the PlayStation version, from a third-person perspective. Namco's NeGcon controller can be used to play the game. Because Ridge Racer is an arcade-style racing game, collisions cause no damage, and merely slow the player down. There is a time limit, which ends the race if counted down to zero.

A single course is featured comprising four configurations of increasing difficulty: Novice, Intermediate, Advanced and Time Trial (the latter two are extended). The player races eleven opponents except in Time Trial, where there is only one. The greater the difficulty, the faster the cars run; Time Trial is the fastest. Each race consists of three laps (two on the beginner course). Checkpoints that grant additional time when passed through are present throughout. In the PlayStation version, after every race is won, reversed ones become available, and an additional opponent is encountered in Time Trial: the 13th Racing (also known as the "Devil" car), the fastest car. On winning, the car is unlocked. The PlayStation version features a hidden "mirror" version of the tracks. It becomes a "mirror image" of itself; left turns become right turns and vice versa, and the surroundings switch sides of the road. In the arcade version, the winning player's score is saved in action-replay highlights after finishing the game.

In the PlayStation version, a mini-game of Galaxian can be played as the game loads. If won, eight additional cars become available. Once the game has loaded, the CD is only needed to play six music tracks. The disc can be replaced during gameplay, although the game does not update; regardless of what disc is inserted, there will always be six tracks, corresponding to the starting points of the tracks on the game disc.

== Development and release ==
At the Japan Amusement Machinery Manufacturers Association (JAMMA) 1992 Amusement Machine Show (AM Show) in Japan, held during 17–19 August, Namco debuted a racing game called SimRoad or Sim Drive for the Namco System 22 arcade system board. It was a sequel to Eunos Roadster Driving Simulator, a Mazda MX-5 driving simulation arcade game that Namco developed with Mazda and released in 1990. Its 3D polygon graphics stood out for the use of Gouraud shading and texture mapping. After a location test at the show, where it was previewed in the November issue of Electronic Gaming Monthly, SimRoad had a limited Japanese release in December 1992, but did not get a mass-market release. It served as a prototype for Ridge Racer.

Ridge Racer had a development cycle of eight months. The development team was under pressure to complete it before their rivals, and designer Fumihiro Tanaka commented that "the other company" (Sega) was in the same position. Ridge Racer was originally planned to be an F1 racing game, but the concept was replaced with one based on a trend among Japanese car enthusiasts at the time. Namco Bandai's general manager, Yozo Sakagami, explained that they liked racing on mountain roads and did not want to slow down around corners, so drifted around them instead. Therefore, the team decided to create a game which allowed players to test their driving skills and experience cars' manipulation at high speeds while mastering drifting. The team did not worry about how Ridge Racer would be received outside Japan: Tanaka explained that it was a naïve time when Japanese developers could develop games for players in general, rather than for specific markets.

During the release for arcade system board, Namco described Ridge Racer as "the most realistic driving game ever". It featured three-dimensional polygon graphics with texture mapping. In Japan, the game was demonstrated at the 1993 AM Show, held in August 1993.

=== Ridge Racer Full Scale ===
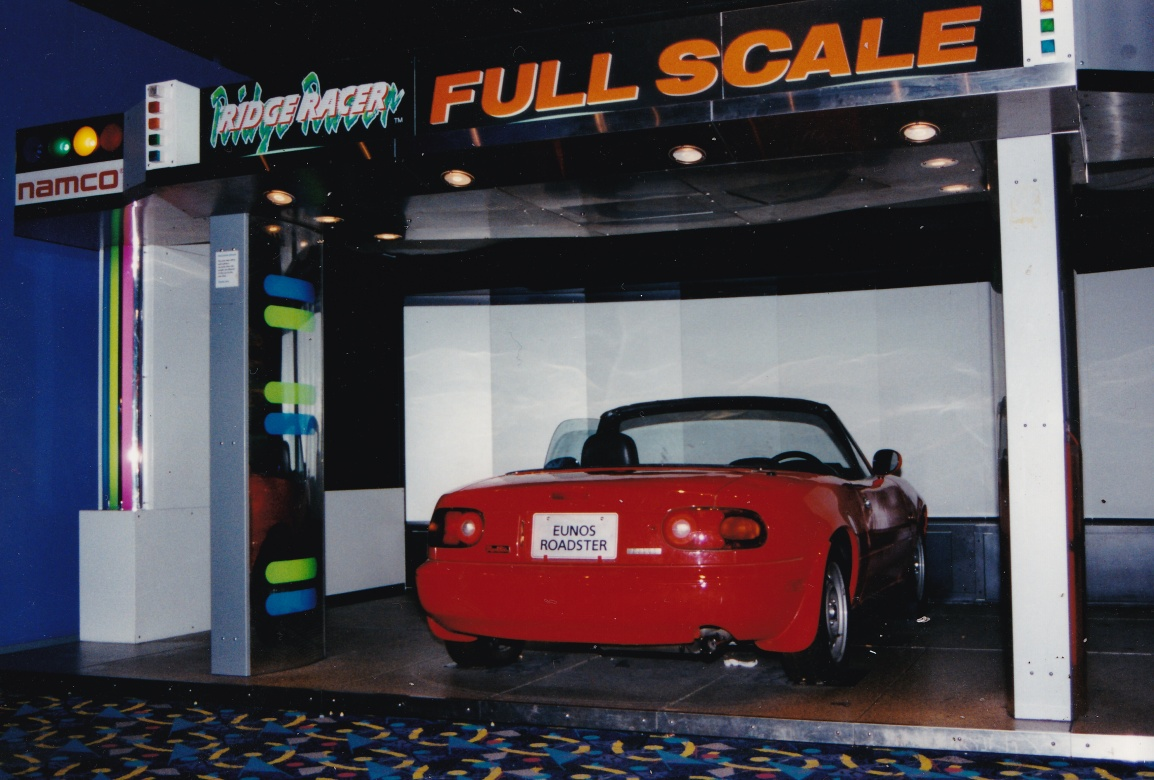
Ridge Racer Full Scale. The car's controls are used to race.

The Ridge Racer Full Scale arcade version was released along with the standard arcade version in 1993. This version was designed to give the player a more realistic driving experience. Players (a passenger could sit in the car next to the driver) sat inside an adapted red Eunos Roadster, the Japanese right-hand drive version of the Mazda MX-5 Miata and controlled the same car on-screen. The game was played in front of a 10 feet (3.0 m) wide, front-projected triple screen (which benefited from dimmed ambient lighting), with the wheel, gear stick and pedals functioning as the controls. The ignition key was used to start, the speed and RPM gauges were functional, and fans blew wind on the player from inside the air vents. Speakers concealed inside the car provided realistic engine and tire sounds; overhead speakers provided surround music.

The Ridge Racer Full Scale cabinet cost £150,000 or $230,000 (equivalent to $500,000 in 2025) to purchase in 1994.

=== PlayStation ===
North American cover art of the PlayStation port

Development of the PlayStation version began in April 1994. Because of the differences, it had to be produced essentially from scratch, and took nearly as long to develop as the arcade version, being half-complete in November. It was mostly complete by December, with the graphics 70 per cent finished. This version was developed by the same team. Because of technical limitations, it was difficult to program and run at a lower resolution, lower framerate (30 frames per second for NTSC, 25 for PAL), and was less detailed. Specialised graphics libraries were developed because it was felt the standard ones provided by Sony were too limited. Visual director Yozo Sakagami remarked that the hardest element to port was the experience of driving a car. It was felt that the NeGcon controller would provide a more analogue feel than the standard PlayStation controller. Sakagami was concerned about loading times because of the CD-ROM format; the team countered this by having all the data loaded into memory by the time the title screen appeared and having the player play a mini-game of Galaxian while waiting. Sakagami chose to include Galaxian because he was part of its arcade team and wanted to honour his former boss. Because CDs were cheaper to produce, the retail price was less than cartridge games despite an increase in development costs. 13th Racing's design was meant to be futuristic, according to Tanaka, because the team was considering the future of sports cars. The team settled on a black car "no-one had ever driven before", and at one point it was known as "The Cockroach" because of its performance. There was a rumour that the PlayStation version would include Ridge Racer 2's link-up mode, which Namco denied.

The PlayStation version was shown at the 1995 Electronic Entertainment Expo event and was an innovation in the use of three-dimensional polygons. Ridge Racer was released in Japan on 3 December 1994, in North America on 9 September 1995, and in Europe on 29 September 1995 as a launch title for the PlayStation. It was re-released in Japan for the PlayStation The Best range in 1997, and for the Greatest Hits and Platinum ranges in North America and PAL regions respectively the same year.

=== Music ===
The soundtrack was produced at the same time as the game by Shinji Hosoe, with contributions from Nobuyoshi Sano and Ayako Saso, as the development team did not have enough time to produce them separately. Initially, the team did not plan to have music, but ended up producing techno, hardcore and gabber, which Tanaka believed helped players to enjoy a fun feeling while playing. Later Ridge Racer series composer Hiroshi Okubo believed techno would give a feeling of energy, journey, and speed, and commented that the genre was chosen because it embodied the game's "unrealistic speed and tension". This was commemorated by the release of Namco Game Sound Express Vol. 11 by Victor Entertainment on 21 January 1994 in Japan, which features remixed versions of the themes.

Track listing of Namco Game Sound Express Vol. 11 - Ridge Racer
| No. | Title | Music | Length |
|---|---|---|---|
| 1. | "Welcome racer" | Shinji Hosoe | 0:50 |
| 2. | "Ridge Racer (Power Remix)" | Shinji Hosoe | 6:25 |
| 3. | "Rare Hero (Sanodigy Mix)" | Nobuyoshi Sano | 4:49 |
| 4. | "Feeling Over (Underground)" | Ayako Saso | 5:54 |
| 5. | "Rotterdam Nation (Foo Mix)" | Shinji Hosoe | 3:53 |
| 6. | "Speedster (I Like A.T Mix)" | Shinji Hosoe | 4:47 |
| 7. | "Rhythm Shift (12" version)" | Shinji Hosoe | 3:38 |
| 8. | "win win win (Death Mix)" | Shinji Hosoe | 0:58 |
| Total length: | | | 31:14 |

== Reception ==
Reception

Review scores
| Publication | Score | |
| Publication | Arcade | PS |
|---|---|---|
| AllGame | 4/5 | 4/5 |
| Computer and Video Games | 80% | 96% |
| Dragon | | 2/5 |
| Edge | Positive | 9/10 |
| Electronic Gaming Monthly | | 17.5/20; 18/20 |
| Famitsu | | 37/40 |
| Game Informer | | 8.75/10 |
| GamePro | | 5/5 |
| Hyper | | 92% |
| IGN | | 7.5/10 |
| Next Generation | | 4/5 |
| PlayStation Official Magazine – UK | | 8/10 |
| Coming Soon Magazine | | 4.5/5 |
| Dengeki PlayStation | | 95/100, 95/100, 95/100, 90/100 |
| The Electric Playground | | 10/10 |
| Maximum | | 4/5 |

Award
| Publication | Award |
|---|---|
| Electronic Gaming Monthly | Best Driving Game (1995) |

=== Arcade ===
In Japan, Game Machine listed Ridge Racer as the most successful upright/cockpit arcade game of November 1993. It went on to be the highest-grossing dedicated arcade game of 1994 in Japan. In North America, Play Meter listed Ridge Racer as the third most popular arcade game in February 1994. In the United Kingdom, it was London's top-grossing arcade game in early 1994.

Upon release in arcades, Ridge Racer received critical acclaim, particularly for its graphics and sound. Following its AM Show demonstration in August 1993, Edge magazine said that the game's custom-designed real-time texture mapping and rendering system pumps out the most photorealistic image ever seen in the arcades. He also said that Namco managed to put Virtua Racing from Sega firmly in the shade with the release of own title. RePlay magazine praised the graphics, calling it "the first" video game with "next-generation computer texture-mapping" graphics. Following its European debut at the Amusement Trades Exhibition International (ATEI) in January 1994, Edge considered Ridge Racer the most visually impressive 3D game at the time. In March, Computer and Video Games writer Paul Rand gave high marks, remarking that it was "far and away the most realistic arcade game ever seen" on reviewing the arcade machine (based on the full-scale unit). Compared to Virtua Racing, he considered Ridge Racer to have the better "drop-dread stunning" graphics and Virtua Racing to have the better gameplay.

=== PlayStation ===
In Japan, the PlayStation version sold 859,085 units by 1995. In the United States, it sold 609,422 units, including 60,958 bundled units and 548,464 standalone units. This adds up to 1,468,507 units sold in Japan and the United States.

The PlayStation port also received positive reviews from critics. In a review of its Japanese console release, GamePro called the PlayStation version "a near carbon copy of the original" and praised the graphics, soundtrack, and the entire game being loaded into the PlayStation's RAM, eliminating mid-game loading and giving the option of removing the game disc and using the PlayStation as a music CD player during gameplay. Although they criticised the graphical glitches and slowdown, the game was recommended. Next Generation applauded the conversion's faithful recreation of the arcade version, smooth graphics, and additional cars. Although they noted the lack of variety in the different cars' performance and the absence of a multiplayer mode as downsides, they found the game remarkable overall and commented that Ridge Racer was an early game for the PlayStation, and a rushed project at that, making it "an excellent harbinger of what's to come". GamePro's review of the later North American release judged that the game surpassed competitor Daytona USA in graphics, audio, and control responsiveness, and called it the best racing game to date for home systems. Commenting on the realism, Game Informer remarked that Ridge Racer better captures the feel of high performance car racing than any existing driving game.

Electronic Gaming Monthly's two sports reviewers praised the gameplay and music. Maximum commented that Ridge Racer has only one track and the game lacks the attractive crash sequences of Daytona USA, but they commented positively on the feeling of smoothness and speed, the "distinctly European" dance music, the engine sounds, and the unrealistically exaggerated driving manoeuvres. In 1996, two years after its release, IGN commented that the game has stood the test of time, but complained of lacking two-player mode and that the cars don't really vary in performances. AllGame's Shawn Sackenheim praised the game, particularly the graphics and audio. Coming Soon Magazine praised its "ultra fluid and very realistic" graphics, but criticised the game for being too short. The Electric Playground's Victor Lucas gave top marks, remarking: "The experience of playing RR supersedes the thrills generally attributed to playing other racing video games. I really can't stress enough how deserving of your video game dollars Ridge Racer is". Edge praised the "dazzling" graphics and "arcade-perfect" music.

Despite positive reviews, the game was criticised by 1UP.com for the arcade style of gameplay. The lack of artificial intelligence has received criticism - the movement of the computer-controlled cars is restricted to predetermined waypoints. The game was reviewed in 1995 in Dragon No. 221 by Jay & Dee in the "Eye of the Monitor" column, where Dee called it "just another racing game".

Ridge Racer was awarded Best Driving Game of 1995 by Electronic Gaming Monthly. In 1996, GamesMaster ranked the game 23rd on their "Top 100 Games of All Time."

=== Legacy ===
Ridge Racer was listed as one of the best games of all time by Game Informer in 2001, Yahoo in 2005, Electronic Gaming Monthly in 2006, Guinness World Records in 2008 and 2009, NowGamer in 2010, and FHM in 2012.

According to RePlay and Play Meter magazines, Ridge Racer was the first arcade game with texture-mapped 3D graphics. Greg Reeves in Play Meter said the game's texture mapping combined "the depth, perspective, and distance" of Virtua Racing with the enhanced "scenery details" of OutRunners (1992), resulting in "scenery such as rocks, trees, and roads" that looked realistic.

Ridge Racer influenced the development of rival Sega's arcade game Daytona USA. Sega mandated that Daytona USA had to be better than Ridge Racer. Whereas Ridge Racer focused on simulation, Daytona USA instead aimed for "funky entertainment". Daytona USA shares some features with Ridge Racer, including a drifting mechanic.

Ridge Racer has been followed by many sequels and helped establish the PlayStation's popularity. IGN stated that Ridge Racer was "one of PlayStation's first big system pushers" and an excellent port of the arcade version that showed the true potential of Sony's 32-bit wonder. UGO Networks's Michael Hess and Chris Plante said that it set the stage for Sony Computer Entertainment Japan's Gran Turismo by adding an option to choose between automatic and manual transmission. John Davison of 1UP.com said that Ridge Racer was an "unbelievable demonstration of what the PlayStation could do".

== Other releases ==
The PlayStation version was re-released for The Best, Greatest Hits, and Platinum ranges in 1997. A PC port was cancelled. Ridge Racer received a number of ports and spin-offs:

=== Ridge Racer: 3 Screen Edition ===
A version with three screens was released for arcades to give a peripheral vision effect. The machine used multiple System 22 arcade boards to drive the additional monitors and was only available in the sit down version.

=== Pocket Racer ===
Pocket Racer, a version featuring buggies

Pocket Racer (ポケットレーサー, Poketto Rēsā) is a super deformed version with cars resembling Choro-Q models, aimed at children. Released in 1996 in Japan, it was only available in an upright cabinet version, and uses Namco System 11 hardware. A similar game is included in Ridge Racer Revolution using the same cars under the name Pretty Racer (also known as buggy mode), the inspiration for this game.

=== Ridge Racer Turbo ===
Ridge Racer Turbo features updated graphics and a higher frame rate.

R4: Ridge Racer Type 4 (released on 3 December 1998 in Japan, 1 May 1999 in North America, and on 1 September in Europe) includes a bonus disc containing a new version of the original Ridge Racer, called Ridge Racer Turbo in North America, Ridge Racer Hi-Spec Demo in Europe, and Ridge Racer Hi Spec Version (リッジレーサーハイスペックバージョン, Rijji Rēsā Hai Supekku Bājon) in Japan. It features improved graphics, runs at 60 frames per second (50 for PAL), as opposed to the original 30, and supports vibration feedback and the Jogcon controller. There is only one opponent (two in time trial boss races), and the White Angel from Ridge Racer Revolution appears in addition to the 13th Racing as a boss and unlockable car. A Time Attack mode is added, in which the player attempts to beat the time record with no opponent cars. This is distinct from Time Trial, where there are opponent cars.

=== Mobile versions ===
A version for mobile phones (J2ME platform) was released on 31 December 2005. It received mixed reviews. GameSpot's Jeff Gerstmann gave the game 6.1/10. He praised graphics as "somewhat impressive for a mobile game", but criticised the steering. Levi Buchanan of IGN gave Ridge Racer 6.2/10, complaining about the problematic controls and saying that the game without the analogue control "feels really lacking". In 2005, a version of Ridge Racer was released for mobile phones under the name Ridge Racer 3D (not to be confused with the later Ridge Racer 3D for the Nintendo 3DS). This version was ported to the Zeebo in August 2009.

=== Arcade Archives and Arcade Archives 2 releases ===
With the Nintendo Switch 2 announced for release on June 5, 2025, during a Nintendo Direct, Hamster Corporation released the original arcade version for the first time as part of the Arcade Archives 2 series the same day the Nintendo Switch 2 was released. In addition, the game was also made available as part of the same series for the PlayStation 5 and Xbox Series X/S, as well as the original Arcade Archives for the PlayStation 4 and Nintendo Switch.
