= R4: Ridge Racer Type 4 =

1998 video game

- North American cover art featuring the Assoluto Bisonte (foreground) and the Terrazi Troop (background)
- Developer: Namco
- Publishers: JP: Namco; NA: Namco Hometek; EU: Sony Computer Entertainment
- Producer: Shigeru Yokoyama
- Programmer: Masatoshi Kobayashi
- Artist: Kazutoki Kono
- Composers: Kohta Takahashi; Hiroshi Okubo; Asuka Sakai
- Series: Ridge Racer
- Platform: PlayStation
- Release: JP: 3 December 1998; EU: 16 April 1999; NA: 4 May 1999
- Genre: Racing
- Modes: Single-player, multiplayer

R4: Ridge Racer Type 4, (Note: Japanese: リッジレーサータイプ4, Hepburn: Rijji Rēsā Taipu Fō) released without the 'R4' prefix in PAL territories, is a 1998 racing video game developed and published by Namco for the PlayStation. It is the fourth home title in the Ridge Racer series after Rage Racer (1996); the game was initially released on December 3, 1998 in Japan, with global releases following in 1999.

Maintaining the arcade-style gameplay of its predecessors, R4: Ridge Racer Type 4 introduces a new Grand Prix, named Real Racing Roots '99, consisting of four teams that the player may join, with associated sponsorships that can also be chosen, each offering different effects to the driving. Additionally, every team also has its own story mode, accompanied with a manager that interacts with the player during the season. The number of car models was expanded to include over 300 vehicles.

R4: Ridge Racer Type 4 was positively received, with praise for its presentation, art, driving, and soundtrack; however, some criticism was directed to its cars' overly light drifting compared to earlier titles in the series. Retrospective reviewers considered it as one of the greatest racing games ever made. The game was later re-released on the PlayStation Network service in 2011, on the PlayStation Classic console in 2018, and in 2023 for PlayStation 4 and PlayStation 5. It was followed by Ridge Racer V in 2000, which moved the series on to next generation hardware.

== Gameplay ==
A typical race in progress, taking place at the Helter Skelter circuit, featuring the player driving the Terrazi Ambitious as part of the Pac Racing Club attempting to overtake the Lizard Bonfire of Dig Racing Team

R4: Ridge Racer Type 4 is an arcade-style racing game with a strong emphasis on powersliding around corners. Vehicles use one of two styles of powersliding depending on the make of car they select: Drift and Grip. Drift cars require players to tap the brake once while turning to break into a smooth powerslide while Grip cars requires players to alternate between brakes and gas while turning to powerslide.

Vehicles are earned by playing through the game's Grand Prix mode. Players select one of four teams; R.C Micro Mouse Mappy (France), Pac Racing Club (Japan), Racing Team Solvalou (Italy), and Dig Racing Team (United States), who each have varying difficulties, and one of four manufacturers; Age Solo (France), Lizard (United States), Assoluto (Italy), and Terrazi (Japan), which determines the style of car and powerslide type the player will use. In each race, the player must attempt to reach a qualifying position, with later stages requiring players to place in higher positions to qualify. Depending on the qualifying position in each race, players will be awarded a new vehicle, or an upgrade to their current one, based on their team and manufacturer, with better cars earned for reaching consistently higher positions (i.e. the best cars are earned by placing 1st in each match while the least impressive cars are earned by just clearing the minimum qualifying positions). There are a total of 320 vehicles earned by racing with every combination of team, manufacturer and qualifying position. If the players unlock all 320 cars, they will unlock an additional one modelled after Pac-Man, for a total of 321 vehicles.

The game also features Time Attack mode, in which players can attempt to get the fastest time on each course, and VS. Battle, a split-screen mode for two players (the first to appear in the home console series) and an undocumented PlayStation Link Cable mode, allowing four players to play simultaneously. Players can also create their own car decors and participate in Extra Trials against powerful prototype cars. The game is also compatible with the PocketStation device in Japan, which allows players to trade cars with friends.

== Development ==
Development of R4: Ridge Racer Type 4 began in May 1997. All the 33 staff members had also worked previously on the original Ridge Racer (1993). The game was also the first Ridge Racer on the PlayStation to use Gouraud shading on polygons. Developmental staff members commented that much "waste" was removed in order to make Gouraud shading and high polygon counts possible. Similarly to the critically acclaimed Gran Turismo at the time, R4: Ridge Racer Type 4 made use of SCE's Performance Analyser devkit. The team initially didn't expect to achieve all graphical advances but eventually succeeded in doing them, and even added additional features during development. Ace Combat 2 was used by the art director for inspiration regarding the sky effects in the game. The opening movie, featuring series mascot Reiko Nagase, took over six months to make including planning.

=== Music ===
Hiroshi Okubo served as the sound director and lead composer of the game's soundtrack, with Kohta Takahashi and Asuka Sakai also contributing several tracks, and Tetsukazu Nakanishi and Koji Nakagawa contributing two tracks each. Whereas previous games had music inspired by rave and hardcore, R4 instead explores music styles encompassing funk, breakbeat, acid jazz, UK garage, progressive house, and neo soul. Okubo himself described R4's music as "more mature, more fashionable" compared to the past.

Okubo had previously composed additional tracks for Ridge Racer Revolution with Nobuhide Isayama and the whole soundtrack of Rage Racer with Nakanishi, both of which roughly retain the original's rave sound. A handful of tracks in the game, including the theme song "Ridge Racer (One More Win)", feature vocals by American singer Kimara Lovelace. Okubo first discovered her at a club event in Nishi-Azabu in May 1998; he was impressed by her powerful voice, and felt she fitted the game direction's keywords of "urban" and "cool".

The music was designed to correspond with the game's human drama, so the composers aimed to evoke emotions of sadness and tension in their tracks. Both Takahashi and Sakai previously did not have much knowledge or interest in club music; initial tracks they composed for the game were frequently rejected by Okubo for not fitting into the club sound or being "game like". Takahashi described him as "the gatekeeper to club sound hell", while Okubo took piano parts from one of Sakai's tracks and reworked it into "Quiet Curves", much to her annoyance. Nakagawa, who was working on the soundtrack for Techno Drive at the time, was asked by Okubo to contribute due to his experience with composing techno music, while Nakanishi was involved towards the end of the project.

A soundtrack for the game, R4: Ridge Racer Type 4 Direct Audio was released by Media Factory on January 27, 1999. On March 21, 2019, SuperSweep released R4: The 20th Anniv. Sounds, consisting of two CDs: the first includes new remixes by a variety of artists, and the second including a remastered version of the original soundtrack.

=== Release ===
A peripheral, the Jogcon, was released alongside the game, packaged in special editions. The device features a steering wheel type device in the middle of the controller to provide accurate control. R4: Ridge Racer Type 4 was also released with a bonus disc containing a High-Spec version of the original Ridge Racer, running at 60 frames per second like its arcade counterpart. The disc also contains demos for LiberoGrande, Tales of Destiny, Tekken 3, and Klonoa.

== Reception ==
Reception

Aggregate score
Aggregator	Score
Metacritic	88/100

Review scores
Publication	Score
AllGame	4.5/5
Edge	8/10
Electronic Gaming Monthly	8/9/9.5/8.5
Famitsu	35/40
Game Informer	8.25/10
GamePro	4/5
GameRevolution	B
GameSpot	8.7/10
IGN	9.4/10
Next Generation	4/5
PlayStation Official Magazine – UK	9/10
Official U.S. PlayStation Magazine	4/5
Dengeki PlayStation	90/100, 95/100, 95/100, 100/100

R4: Ridge Racer Type 4 received "generally favorable reviews" according to the review aggregation website Metacritic.

Jeff Gerstmann of GameSpot and Next Generation gave positive reviews to the game.

Keith Stuart of Official UK PlayStation Magazine in its preview gave a strongly positive reception to the game design such as light and shadow effects. He also added in comparison to other racers: "Not everyone enjoyed the obsessive intricacy and detail of Gran Turismo, but many found sub-arcade fare like Motorhead lacking in substance. With R4's combination of immediate gameplay and real depth, players get the best of both worlds."

In Japan, Famitsu gave it a score of 35 out of 40.

=== Retrospective ===
James O'Neill of Push Square noted it as the best of the PS1 Ridge Racer games. Jeremy Peeples of Hardcore Gamer said in 2018 that "R4 remains a high mark for the series and no entry has quite topped it yet." In 2023, Time Extension ranked the game first on their "Best Ridge Racer Games" list. Polygon and GamesRadar have ranked the game among the best PS1 games. Den of Geek included the game on their list of "20 PlayStation One Games That Were Way Ahead of Their Time" for getting the balance of "arcadey" and "realistic" right, also noting it as one of the best-looking PS1 titles.

=== Commercial ===
It was a commercial success in Japan, and various European territories. It was the 18th best-selling video game in Japan in 1998, having been on the market for under a month before the year end. The game sold a total of 759,527 units in Japan and 297,564 units in the United States, for a total of 1,057,091 units sold in Japan and the United States.
