= Rage Racer =

1996 video game

- Japanese cover art
- Developer: Namco
- Publishers: JP: Namco; NA: Namco Hometek; EU: Sony Computer Entertainment
- Director: Motomi Katayama
- Producer: Shigeru Yokoyama
- Designers: Motomi Katayama, Yasuhito Nagaoka
- Composers: Tetsukazu Nakanishi; Hiroshi Okubo
- Series: Ridge Racer
- Platform: PlayStation
- Release: JP: December 3, 1996; NA: May 13, 1997; EU: June 13, 1997
- Genre: Racing
- Mode: Single-player

Rage Racer (Note: Japanese: レイジレーサー, Hepburn: Reiji Rēsā) is a 1996 racing video game developed and published by Namco for the PlayStation. It is the fifth installment in the Ridge Racer series and the third on the PlayStation following Ridge Racer Revolution (1995). It was released in Japan on December 3, 1996, with releases elsewhere following in 1997. It was the first game in the series to feature a CGI animated introduction, and introduced a new "mascot", Reiko Nagase.

The game introduced a new class-based Grand Prix on which the player must progress, and, in an aesthetic change, Rage Racer had darker colors and visuals. The game received a positive critical reception, with its graphics and gameplay praised, although received criticism for its crash mechanics, relatively drab visual style and shortage of tracks. Its impact was limited due to being not as groundbreaking as its predecessors, but nevertheless it sold well. Rage Racer was followed by a sequel, R4: Ridge Racer Type 4 in 1998.

== Gameplay ==
Gameplay screenshot (Yokohama Rubber Company billboard can be seen.)

Visually the game takes graphical cues from Rave Racer, Ridge Racer's arcade successor, with a more realistic and darker color scheme. The game utilises a credits system, the first in the series; under this system, the player tries to earn credits by winning races, which can be used to buy and upgrade cars.

Cars from four manufacturers can be purchased, each favoring a different attribute (e.g., handling, acceleration, speed). All manufacturers offer a 'standard' car and a 'secret' car, which is locked until the top racing class has been reached. Rage Racer also offers a truck as an unlockable vehicle. All of the 'standard' cars can be upgraded, in several stages of increasing cost.

The racing is separated into five numbered classes, named 'Class 1' through to 'Class 5'. The player has three attempts to place in the top three of each class's events, before progressing to the next class. When the player has completed the five 'Normal GP' events, the 'Extra GP' is unlocked. This allows the player to race the same classes on reversed courses. As well as unlocking the Extra GP, the player receives 999,999,999 e.g. in Normal GP - more than enough to purchase all of the cars and upgrade them to Grade 5.

== Development ==
In an interview with the Namco development team, Nobuhisa Mikoda (Rage Racer game designer and project director) admitted that the game was "somewhat off series and aimed to pursue enjoyment in shift controlling". Rage Racer's introduction introduced "mascot girl" Reiko Nagase. Composed by Tetsukazu Nakanishi and Hiroshi Okubo, it marked the beginning of Namco's new primary sound team after their former members began working with other companies doing production on games such as Street Fighter EX (1996) and Driving Emotion Type-S (2000). The former had previously worked on Ridge Racer Revolution.

The game was unveiled at the August 1996 Tokyo Game Show, at which point it had yet to be titled.

== Reception ==
Reception

Aggregate score
Aggregator	Score
GameRankings	83%

Review scores
Publication	Score
CNET Gamecenter	8/10
Computer and Video Games	5/5
Edge	8/10
Electronic Gaming Monthly	9/10
Famitsu	31/40
Game Informer	8.25/10
GameFan	97% (Note: In GameFan's viewpoint, two critics gave it each a score of 98, and the other gave it 95.)
GameRevolution	B
GameSpot	7.6/10
IGN	7/10
Next Generation	3/5
PlayStation Official Magazine – UK	9/10

Reviews for Rage Racer were positive, though generally mild. Critics widely approved of the use of more photo-realistic visuals than the previous games in the series, though some complained that they were comparatively drab and lacking in color.

Comments on the game varied widely, but criticisms tended to focus on a lack of improvement over the previous games in what the reviewers saw as key areas. For example, a Next Generation critic summed up, "Ridge Racer games have never been deficient in gameplay or graphics, and Rage Racer is the best of the lot, but this third incarnation still lacks the depth and replay value that can only be satisfied by finally knuckling down and giving players more tracks." IGN concluded, "It's not a bad game, we've just seen it all before (and before that even)." Jeff Gerstmann of GameSpot criticized it for failing to improve upon the unrealistic crashes seen in previous installments, though he nonetheless described it as "an outstanding sequel".

Next Generation re-reviewed the game three months later, saying, "Rage Racer has all the classic elements of Namco's series - the pounding techno music, cheesy but encouraging vocal soundbites, slick power slides - but it ultimately leaves you with the uneasy feeling of déjà vu. Sure, it's a good series, but let's see something new next time."

Kraig Kujawa and Dean Hager of Electronic Gaming Monthly both described Rage Racer as a dramatic improvement over the original Ridge Racer. GamePro concluded that "Once you get over the game's initial lull, you will have plenty to rage about with this cool new Racer." (Note: GamePro gave the game 4.0/5 for graphics, 4.5/5 for fun factor, 4.5/5 for control, and 4.0/5 for sound.) Official UK PlayStation Magazine said that Namco had succeeded in developing their game even further, and praised the track and car count, before concluding: "The pick-up-and-play experience of the original remains, only now there is more longevity because of the incentive to progress through the classes and upgrade to the fastest cars."

Alex Ward, creator of Criterion Games's Burnout series, said in a 2004 interview that he thought Rage Racer was the best title in the Ridge Racer series. He added: "Although Phanto Mile [from R4: Ridge Racer Type 4] was strong, it doesn't beat the Extreme Oval from Rage Racer".

=== Accolades ===
Rage Racer was a runner-up for "Racing Game of the Year" (behind Diddy Kong Racing) at Electronic Gaming Monthly's 1997 Editors' Choice Awards.
