= Namco Networks =

American mobile game company

- Type: Division
- Industry: Mobile game
- Founded: January 1, 2006; 20 years ago
- Defunct: 2011; 15 years ago
- Fate: Merged with Namco Bandai Games
- Headquarters: San Jose, California, United States
- Parent: Bandai Namco Holdings
- Website: www.namcogames.com

Namco Networks was an American developer and publisher of video games for mobile phones, based in San Jose, California. The company was founded on January 1, 2006, as the mobile phone division of Namco America, and produced video games for mobile phones in North America, Europe and Asia, many of which were ports of older Namco video games. Their first release was a port of Pac-Man, which was part of a batch of nine titles to be released for the iPod. Namco Networks' licensed port of Scene It? Movies is regarded as one of the first North American mobile games to incorporate downloadable, streaming video content for phones. In 2011, the company was merged with Namco Hometek, who was Namco's older home console division, to form Bandai Namco Games America, which subsequently became Bandai Namco Entertainment America in 2015.

== History ==
The division started in 2003 as the mobile gaming arm of the arcade group Namco America and was spun off when that group was strategically acquired by Bandai Namco Holdings and renamed as Namco Networks to serve as its mobile games division. In mid-2004 the group only had four full-time staff positions and contracted game development out to a number of mobile developers. By 2007 it had built its own internal development and marketing group and the staff was well over 100, also employing a large contract QA arm. The shift in mobile publishing from carriers to app stores after introduction of the iPhone shifted the marketplace to the division's detriment. In November 2010, Namco Networks laid off 90 staffers and stated that more of the work would be shifted to its counterpart in Japan, referring to the division of Bandai Namco Games that was once known as Bandai Networks prior to the merger.
