= Ridge Racer Revolution =

1995 video game

- PAL box art featuring the White Angel
- Developer: Namco
- Publishers: JP: Namco; NA: Namco Hometek; EU: Sony Computer Entertainment
- Composers: Hiroshi Okubo; Nobuhide Isayama
- Series: Ridge Racer
- Platform: PlayStation
- Release: JP: December 3, 1995; EU: May 17, 1996; NA: September 25, 1996
- Genre: Racing
- Modes: Single-player, multiplayer

Ridge Racer Revolution (Note: Ridge Racer Revolution (リッジレーサーレボリューション, Rijji Rēsā Reboryūshon)) is a 1995 racing video game developed and published by Namco for the PlayStation. It is the sequel to the PlayStation version of Ridge Racer (the arcade sequel is Ridge Racer 2). Like the original Ridge Racer, the player races computer-controlled cars with the objective of winning a series of races, and supports Namco's NeGcon controller. Ridge Racer Revolution adds two hidden cars, and two-player support via the PlayStation Link cable, and took roughly the same time to develop as the first. The intention was to increase the depth and add features.

The game borrows most of its soundtrack from Ridge Racer 2. Ridge Racer Revolution was re-released in Japan for the PlayStation The Best range in June 1997, and for the Platinum Range in PAL regions the following year. The game received critical acclaim, with reviewers praising its graphics, multiplayer mode, and improvements over its predecessor, although some criticized its lack of innovation. Ridge Racer Revolution was followed by a sequel, Rage Racer, in 1996.

== Gameplay ==
A race in progress

The gameplay system remains unchanged from Ridge Racer, the checkpoint and time limit system remain the same; running out of time ends the race and passing through checkpoints grants additional time, although the car drifting is more like Ridge Racer 2. The player drives using automatic transmission or manual transmission. Ridge Racer Revolution supports Namco's NeGcon controller, and adds a rear-view mirror when using the in-car view. The game consists of three courses: 'Novice', 'Intermediate' (also called 'Advanced'), and 'Expert'. Each difficulty level has different sections opened, and incorporates modes from the original game; Race, against eleven opponents, and Time Trial, against one. Ridge Racer Revolution adds a mode: Free Run, in which there are no other cars and the player practises driving. There is no lap limit. How fast the cars run depends on which speed grade is used, selectable in Free Run, and can be unlocked for Race. It is not available in Time Trial. A new feature is the option to select the time of day in which the race takes place, although this is not available at the start of the game. Ridge Racer Revolution features a two-player link-up mode which allows the players access to the original Ridge Racer's courses known as 'Special 1' and 'Special 2'. There are two modes in two-player link-up: Race, identical to its single-player counterpart, and Versus, where only the players race against each other. Versus features a handicap option, increasing the speed of the trailing car.

Like the first Ridge Racer, the player normally starts with four cars. The remaining eight are selectable on winning the mini game before the title screen (the mini game is Galaga '88 instead of the original game's Galaxian). They are mostly unchanged; their names (certain cars are named after other Namco titles) and specifications are similar to the first game. After the player wins the first three circuits, reversed versions are unlocked, and Time Trial features an additional opponent driving a secret car. There are three secret cars; the '13th Racing' (from the first Ridge Racer) of the Novice course, and the new '13th Racing Kid' (of the Intermediate course) and 'White Angel' (of the Expert course), the car featured on the cover art. These cars are unlocked upon winning the respective course's Time Trial race.

Ridge Racer Revolution features two hidden modes; 'Drift Contest', where points are earned according to how well spins are performed on certain corners, and 'Pretty Racer' (also known as 'Buggy mode'), in which the cars size appears with deformed body sizes, similar to Choro-Q cars, which led to the arcade game Pocket Racer. Mirrored tracks that function identically to the original game are accessible. Like the first game, a music CD can be inserted and listened to instead of the soundtrack. Unlike the first game, only the last course played is loaded into the PlayStation's memory; to switch, the game disc needs to be reinserted before loading.

== Development ==
Ridge Racer Revolution was developed over eight months by a team of more than twenty people, most of whom joined just for Ridge Racer Revolution. The biggest difficulties were the link-up mode, rear-view mirror, and running the game at high speeds. Each member had worked on other console games, and they commented that the graphics detail showed the improvements in skill and technique. The team wanted players to enjoy a more in-depth game than the original, so rather than develop a port of Ridge Racer 2, as many features as possible were added. The early designs for the new courses were made in a 'free run' programme, and used to see how fast the cars went. The rear-view mirror was added primarily with the two player link-up mode in mind. The music was mostly taken from Ridge Racer 2, and as a result, the sound was finished more quickly than the game. Soundtrack composition for Ridge Racer 2 involved Shinji Hosoe, Nobuyoshi Sano, Ayako Saso, and Takayuki Aihara, although new tracks were composed by Hiroshi Okubo and Nobuhide Isayama. The team kept exploring the PlayStation's capabilities to solve the high speed problem, although were confident it was possible. The designer, Hiroyuki Onada, commented that designing an original course was a challenge, and director Kazumi Mizuno believed that graphics quality would be degraded with a split-screen multiplayer mode, so the team decided to focus on the PlayStation's link-up instead.

== Reception ==
Reception

Review scores
Publication	Score
Computer and Video Games	95/100
Edge	7/10
Electronic Gaming Monthly	9/10
Famitsu	39/40
GameSpot	5.9/10
Next Generation	2/5
Coming Soon Magazine	4.5/5
Maximum	5/5
The Electric Playground	8.5/10
Absolute PlayStation	9/10
Gamezilla	81/100
Official UK PlayStation Magazine	7/10

The game was a bestseller in the UK. It was the top-selling game on the UK multi-format chart in May 1996.

The additional features and improvements over the original in particular were given high praise. Coming Soon Magazine praised its multiplayer mode, saying it "will furnish many hours of competitive fun!", and in their conclusion remarked that the game "is an excellent racing game that will yield much excitement and challenges". A reviewer from Absolute PlayStation concurred with this by praising its playability, its "greatly" improved artificial Intelligence, and the two-player link-up feature. Both of Electronic Gaming Monthly's sports reviewers thought that Ridge Racer Revolution is better than the original, due to the cleaner graphics and improved handling on the cars, which it was believed makes them easier to control. David Hodgson of Maximum acknowledged the similarity to the original Ridge Racer but gave it a strong recommendation, arguing that removal of the slowdown and track updating of the original, the unlockables, and the two-player mode make it worth buying. His conclusion was that the game is "an instantly playable arcade racer that oozes options and playability".

The Electric Playground's reviewer complimented the additions and improvements, including the "much improved" graphics and the scene changes, about which it was commented that it was a "serious improvement". It was commented that the colours are "sharp and pretty", and the link-up multiplayer mode was lauded, although the remixed music tracks were criticised because they "pale greatly in comparison to the original tracks". The new tracks were complimented as "always challenging and fun to race" by Gamezilla's Mark Skorupa, who also praised Free Run, saying it's a "great way to learn the tracks". Major Mike of GamePro believed the game surpassed the first and upheld the Ridge Racer tradition, and Computer and Video Games Magazine's reviewer commented that the game is "Everything Ridge Racer maniacs could have wanted from a sequel".

Hugh Sterbakov of GameSpot was more critical. He called it "a clone of the original", and criticised the lack of split-screen multiplayer. Another critical reviewer was from Edge; he described the game as "virtually indistinguishable" from the first Ridge Racer, and commented that Ridge Racer Revolution does not fulfil the expectations evoked by the original. It was also stated that it is simply a "jazzed-up" Ridge Racer 2, and the visuals were criticised as "antiquated". Despite these criticisms, the handling was praised, and the gameplay was described as "varied". A reviewer for Next Generation contended that the original Ridge Racer was rushed in order to make it out for the PlayStation launch, and that whereas rival Sega had done an exceptional job of fixing their own launch day rush job with Virtua Fighter Remix, "Namco has simply released a disc with a new track, using the same flawed game engine". He particularly felt that the price was much too high for what was essentially an expansion pack, and concluded that anyone who bought the game would be "a half-step away from being conned". Will Groves of the Official UK PlayStation Magazine described the game as "a poor sequel", but liked the range of options provided. He described the game itself as "great", but further criticised it for not being fun, as he thought the feel is aggressive.
