= List of arcade video games: F =

This is a list of arcade video games organized alphabetically by name. It does not include PC or console games unless they were also released in video arcades. See Lists of video games for related lists.

Title	Alternate Title(s)	Year	Manufacturer	Genre(s)	Max. Players	PCB Model
F-1 Dream	—	1988	Capcom	Racing		
F-1 Grand Prix	—	1991	Video System	Racing		
F-1 Grand Prix Part II	—	1992	Video System	Racing		
F-15 Strike Eagle	—	1990	Microprose	Flight simulation		
F-Zero AX	F-Zero AX Monster Ride	2003	Sega	Racing		
F1 Exhaust Note	—	1991	Sega	Racing		
F1 Grand Prix Star	—	1991	Jaleco	Racing		
F1 Grand Prix Star II	—	1993	Jaleco	Racing		
F1 Super Battle	—	1994	Jaleco	Racing		
F1 Super Lap	—	1992	SEGA	Racing		
F355 Challenge	—	1999	Sega AM2	Racing		
F355 Challenge 2: International Course Edition	—	2001	Sega AM2	Racing		
Face Off	—	1988	Namco	Sports	4	Namco System 1
Fail Gate	—	1991	Seibu Kaihatsu	Scrolling shooter	2	
The Fairyland Story	—	1985	Taito	Platformer	2	
The Fallen Angels	—	1998	Psikyo	Fighting	2	
Fancy World: Earth of Crisis	—	1996	Unico Electronics			
Fantasia	—	1994	Comad/New Japan System			
Fantasia II	—	1997	Comad			
Fantastic Journey	Gokujyou Parodius! - Kako no Eikou wo Motomete ^{JP}	1994	Konami	Horizontal shooter	2	
Fantasy	—	1981	SNK	Action	2	
Fantasy '95	—	1995	Hi-max Technology			
Fantasy Land	—	199?	Electronic Devices			
Fantasy Story	—	2002	ZSoft			
Fantasy Zone	—	1985	Sega	Scrolling shooter	2	
Fantasy Zone II: The Tears of Opa-Opa (1988 version)	—	1988	Sega	Scrolling shooter	2	
Fantasy Zone II: The Tears of Opa-Opa (2008 version)	—	2008	Sega	Scrolling shooter	2	
Far East of Eden: Kabuki Klash	—	1995	SNK			NeoGeo
The Fast & The Furious	—	2010	Raw Thrills			
Fast Draw	—	1983	Stern Electronics			
Fast Draw Showdown	—	1994	American Laser Games			
Fast Freddie	Fly-Boy	1982	Kaneko	Action	2	
Fast Lane	—	1987	Konami	Driving	2	
Faster Than Speed	—	2004	Sammy Corporation			
Fatal Fury: King of Fighters	Garou Densetsu: Shukumei no Tatakai ^{JP}	1991	SNK			NeoGeo
Fatal Fury 2	Garou Densetsu 2: Arata-Naru Tatakai ^{JP}	1992	SNK			NeoGeo
Fatal Fury 3: Road to the Final Victory	Garou Densetsu 3 - Harukanaru Tatakai ^{JP}	1995	SNK			NeoGeo
Fatal Fury Special	Garou Densetsu Special ^{JP}	1993	SNK			NeoGeo
Fatal Fury: Wild Ambition	—	1998	SNK			Hyper NeoGeo 64
Fate/unlimited codes	—	2008	Eighting	Fighter (versus)		
Fax	—	1983	Exidy			
Field Combat	—	1985	Jaleco			
Field Day	The Undoukai ^{JP}	1984	Taito			
Field Goal	—	1979	Taito			
Fight Fever	—	1994	Viccom		2	NeoGeo
Fighter & Attacker	F/A	1992	Namco	Scrolling shooter	2	
Fighter's History	—	1993	Data East			
Fighter's Impact	—	1996	Taito	Polygonal 2-Player fighting game	2	
Fighter's Impact A	—	1997	Taito	Polygonal 2-Player fighting game	2	
Fighting Basketball	—	1984	Paradise			
Fighting Bujutsu	Fighting Wu-Shu 2nd!	1997	KONAMI	Polygonal 2-Player fighting game	2	
Fighting Hawk	—	1988	Taito		2	
Fighting Ice Hockey	—	1984	Data East			
Fighting Layer	—	1998	Namco	Fighter (versus)	2	
Fighting Mania	Punch Mania: Hokuto No Ken	2000	Taito		2	
Fighting Roller	—	1983	Taito			
Fighting Soccer	—	1988	SNK	Sports		
Fighting Vipers	—	1995	Sega	Fighter (versus)	2	
Fighting Vipers 2	—	1998	Sega	Fighter (versus)	2	
Filetto	—	1990	Novarmatic			
Final Blow	—	1986	Taito			
Final Fight	—	1989	Capcom	Beat 'em up	2	CPS1
Final Fight Revenge	—	1999	Capcom	Beat 'em up	2	
Final Furlong	—	1997	Namco	Racing	4	
Final Furlong 2	—	1999	Namco	Racing	4	
Final Lap	—	1987	Namco	Racing	8	
Final Lap 2	—	1990	Namco	Racing	8	
Final Lap 3	—	1992	Namco	Racing	8	
Final Lap R	—	1993	Namco	Racing	4	
The Final Round	Hard Puncher - Ketsumamireru no Eikou	1988	Konami			
Final Shooting: Mobile Suit Gundam	—	1995	Banpresto	Rail shooter	2	
Final Star Force	—	1992	Tecmo	Scrolling shooter	2	
Final Tetris	—	1993	Jeil Computer System			
Finalizer	Finalizer - Super Transformation	1985	Konami	Scrolling shooter	2	
Find Out	—	1987	Elettronolo			
Finest Hour	—	1989	Namco	Shooter	2	
Fire Ball	—	1992	FM Work			
Fire Battle	—	1984	Taito	Scrolling shooter	2	
Fire One	—	1979	Exidy		2	
Fire Shark	Same! Same! Same! ^{JP}	1990	Toaplan	Scrolling shooter	2	
Fire Trap	—	1986	Data East		2	
Fire Truck	Smokey Joe	1978	Atari	Driving	2	
Firefox	—	1984	Atari	Shooter	1	
The First Funky Fighter	—	1993	Taito			
Fisco 400	—	1988	Taito	Racing		
Fisherman's Bait: A Bass Challenge	Bass Angler	1998	Konami	Fishing	2	
Fisherman's Bait: A Marlin Challenge	—	1999	Konami	Fishing	2	
Fisherman's Bait 2: A Bass Challenge	Bass Angler 2	1998	Konami	Fishing	2	
Fishing Maniac 2+	—	2000	Saero	Fishing		
Fishing Maniac 3	—	2002	Saero	Fishing		
Fishing Master	—	1997	Capcom	Fishing		
Fist of the North Star	Hokuto No Ken^{JP}	2005	Sega	Fighting		
Five a Side Soccer	—	1995	Konami			
FixEight	—	1992	Toaplan	Scrolling shooter	2	
Flame Gunner	—	1999	Tecmo, Ltd.			
Flash 3-in-1	—	2004	IGS			
Flash Boy	The Deco Kid	1981	Data East			DECO
Flash Gal		1985	Sega		2	Kyugo
Flash Point	—	1989	Sega	Puzzle	2	
Flicky	—	1984	Sega	Action game	2	Sega system 1
Flip & Flop	—	1984	Exidy			
Flip Maze	—	1999	Taito			Taito G-Net
Flipper Jack	—	1983	Jackson Company			
Flower	—	1986	Komax			
Flyball	—	1976	Atari	Sports	2	
Flying Ball	Bumpoline	1984	Data East			
Flying Fortress	—	1976	Electra Games			
Flying Shark	Sky Shark ^{US} Hishouzame ^{JP}	1987	Toaplan	Scrolling shooter	2	
Flying Tiger	—	1992	Dooyong	Scrolling shooter	2	
Fonz	Fonz; Moto-Cross	1976	Sega-Gremlin			
Food Fight	—	1982	Atari	Shooter	2	
Football Crazy	—	1997	Bell-Fruit			
Football Frenzy	—	1992	SNK			NeoGeo
Football Power	—	1999	Gaelco			
Forgotten Worlds	—	1988	Capcom	Scrolling shooter	2	CPS1
Formation Z	Aeroboto ^{NA}	1984	Jaleco	Scrolling shooter	2	
Fortress 2 Blue Arcade	—	2001	Eolith	Shooter		
Four Trax	—	1989	Namco	Racing	4	
Fred Flintstone's Memory Match	—	1994				
Free Kick	—	1987				
Freeze	—	1984	Cinematronics			
Frenzy	—	1982	Stern Electronics	Shooter game	2	
Frenzy Express	—	2001	Uniania			
Frisky Tom	—	1981	Nichibutsu	Action	2	
Frog & Spiders	—	1981	Taito			
Frogger	—	1981	Konami	Action	2	
Frogs	—	1978	Sega / Gremlin	Action / Platformer	1	
Front Line	—	1982	Taito		2	
Fun Casino	—	1983	Status Games			
Fun Four	—	1976	Bailey International			
Fun Station Spielekoffer 9 Spiele	—	2000	ADP			
Fun World Quiz	—	1990	Fun World			
Funky Ball	—	1998	dgPIX Entertainment			
Funky Bee	—	1982	Orca			
Funky Fish	—	1981	Sun Electronics		2	
Funky Head Boxers	—	1995	Sega			
Funky Jet	—	1992	Mitchell			
Funny Bubble	—	1999	Chang Electronic			
Funny Strip	—	199?	MagicGames			
Futsball	—	1975	Allied Leisure Industries			
Future Spy	—	1984	Sega	Isometric shooter	2	
