= Nobuyoshi Sano =

Japanese composer

Nobuyoshi Sano 佐野 信義
- Also known as: sanodg
- Born: January 19, 1969 (age 57); Mishima, Shizuoka, Japan
- Genres: Electro; techno; big beat; synthpop; rave; video game music
- Occupations: Composer; musician; producer
- Instruments: Piano; synthesizer
- Years active: 1992–present

Nobuyoshi Sano (佐野 信義, Sano Nobuyoshi; born January 19, 1969), better known as sanodg, is a Japanese video game composer, musician and record producer. He is best known for scoring tracks for the Ridge Racer and Tekken series, as well as Drakengard.

== Biography ==
=== Early life ===
In elementary school, Sano listened to Yellow Magic Orchestra and played Space Invaders, gaining interest in both video games and music. Prior to joining Namco, he had no inclination towards composing video game music, although he did write music with various synths as a hobby. The first synth he bought was a Korg MS-10, borrowing other synths from friends. During his time at university, he studied telecommunication engineering.

=== Namco (1992–2001) ===
After graduating from university in 1992, Sano found two jobs for Korg and Namco. Disliking the atmosphere of Korg's workplace, he settled with a position as a sound designer at Namco. Sano's first project was Zombie Castle, which he created the sound effects for. The following year, he composed the score of Numan Athletics, taking inspiration from techno. Sano also scored "Rare Hero" for Ridge Racer, a series he has provided music for since. During his early years at the company, he worked closely with senior composer Shinji Hosoe on several game projects, along with Ayako Saso, Takayuki Aihara and Hiroto Sasaki. He contributed several tracks to albums on Hosoe's Troubadour Record label and was also a member of his groups, Oriental Magnetic Yellow (OMY) and Manikyua-Dan. OMY was a group parodying Yellow Magic Orchestra, where he was named Ryuichi Sanomoto, parodying Ryuichi Sakamoto.

Following the transfer of Hosoe, Saso, and Aihara to Arika, Sano composed for Tekken 3 in 1996 with Keiichi Okabe. Serving as the sound director, he took a big beat approach to the music with a slower tempo than the music found in previous games. Some staff, including game director Katsuhiro Harada initially did not understand the big beat direction, but Sano convinced him that it would fit well. Both Sano and Okabe later worked on the PS1 version along with other colleagues, as well as both the arcade and PS2 versions of Tekken Tag Tournament. In 2000, Sano composed two tracks for Ridge Racer V under the direction of Kohta Takahashi, along with colleague Yuu Miyake and various others. This was the first Ridge Racer game he composed for since Rave Racer in 1995. His final in-house work at Namco was sound design for the unreleased game Starblade: Operation Blue Planet.

=== Cavia (2001–2010) ===
In 2001, Sano left Namco citing unhappiness with its recent developments, and subsequently joined Cavia as a sound director. With Takayuki Aihara, Sano composed Drakengard, which released in 2003. Their goal was to create an experimental soundtrack that reflected the hack-and-slash gameplay and dark atmosphere, as well as the narrative theme of "madness." The music was composed through sampling various shortened pieces of classical music that were performed by a full orchestra. Sano and Aihara also sought to emulate the music of Northern Europe. The soundtrack initially received a mixed reception from users, many of whom harshly criticized it for being repetitive and grating. Sano detailed experiences of reading large volumes of negative comments surrounding the music on 2ch on a daily basis. However, it has also been praised for its unconventional approach. As a result of the initial reception, his role in Drakengard 2 was limited to sound direction.

In addition to Drakengard, Sano composed the soundtrack of Resident Evil: Dead Aim, using a synth-heavy score inspired by Goblin. For 2004's Ghost in the Shell: Stand Alone Complex, Sano created drum and bass music to match the game’s sense of speed. In 2006, Sano released a compilation album titled sanodg works, featuring a selection of his favorite tracks, although legal issues prevented him from including any Namco work. The same year, he produced a collaborative album with the company Melody Clip, titled FM Sound Module Maniax. This features tracks from various video game composers written with FM synthesis, including former Namco colleagues Hosoe and Okabe, and famed composers Yoko Shimomura and Yuzo Koshiro. He also served as the music supervisor for Bullet Witch; he requested then-SuperSweep composer Masashi Yano to participate due to his expertise with Hollywood-inspired orchestral scores. Yano and Sano were originally going to collaborate on the score, with Yano composing orchestral parts and Sano handling breakbeat and bass. After Sano combined their parts together, he was dissatisfied with the results and left Yano to compose the entire score alone.

Sano designed and produced KORG DS-10 for Nintendo DS. He formed a trio of the same name consisting of himself, Yasunori Mitsuda and Michio Okamiya in order to promote the program. The three had spoken about their interest in creating a synthesizer for the DS, to Korg's approval. He chose to model the synth on the Korg MS-10 as he bought this synth during his teenage years, and also felt that the DS vaguely resembled the synth.

=== Detune (2010–present) ===
Following Cavia's disbandment, Sano established Detune, a music software production company in May 6, 2010. Detune developed a follow-up to KORG DS-10 titled KORG M01, intended as a DS version of the Korg M1 synth. In 2012, Detune released iYM2151, a music program for the iPad based on the Yamaha YM2151 sound chip. In the same year, Sano composed "Algorithm" for the game Orgarhythm using iYM2151. The following year, a Nintendo 3DS eShop version of KORG M01 was released worldwide, titled KORG M01D. In 2014, he released a compilation album titled sanodg's arcade game music works, which features the soundtracks of four Namco arcade games. During 2016 to 2017 he created a series of EDM-styled albums with Hiroyoshi Kato, the first of which was titled EDM IS GAME.

Sano will score the upcoming mobile FMV game Clive is a Good Guy, developed by British game studio Indolent Games.

== Works ==
Year	Title	Notes
1993	Zombie Castle	Sound effects
1993	Numan Athletics	Music
1993	Eight Line	Music; sound effects
1993	Ridge Racer	Music ("Rare Hero")
1994	Attack of the Zolgear	Sound effects and editing; with Hiroto Sasaki
1994	Ridge Racer 2	Music ("Grip" and "Rare Hero 2")
1995	Mach Breakers	Music with Hiroto Sasaki, Shinji Hosoe and Ayako Saso; sound direction
1995	Tekken	PS1 version; arrangements with various others
1995	Ridge Racer LD	Music with Shinji Hosoe, Ayako Saso and Takayuki Aihara
1995	Rave Racer	Music with Shinji Hosoe, Ayako Saso and Takayuki Aihara
1995	Dirt Dash	Music ("Hill")
1995	Dunk Mania	Music
1995	Cyber Cycles	Music ("Bahama")
1996	Xevious 3D/G	Arcade version; music ("Area 4" and "Boss 4")
1996	Tekken 2	PS1 version; arrangements with various others
1996	Prop Cycle	Music ("Wind Woods")
1996	Dancing Eyes	Music ("Angel Stage" and "Angel Motion")
1997	Tekken 3	Arcade version; music with Keiichi Okabe
1997	Xevious 3D/G+	Console version; music ("Area 4" and "Boss 4")
1998	Tekken 3	PS1 version; music with various others
1998	Gunmen Wars	Music
1999	Tekken Tag Tournament	Arcade version; music with various others
2000	Tekken Tag Tournament	PS2 version; music with various others
2000	World Kicks	Music
2000	Ridge Racer V	Music ("Paris" and "RareHero2000")
2001	Taiko no Tatsujin	Vocals ("Kimi ni, Romantic")
2002	One Piece - Big Secret Treasure of the Seven Phantom Islands	Sound direction
2003	Resident Evil: Dead Aim	Music
2003	Drakengard	Music with Takayuki Aihara
2004	Ghost in the Shell: Stand Alone Complex	Music; sound direction
2004	Ridge Racer	Music ("Chrome Drive" and "Rareheroes")
2005	Tekken 5	PS2 version; music with various others
2005	Drakengard 2	Sound director
2005	Ridge Racer 6	Music ("Floodlight" and "Radiance")
2005	Tekken 5: Dark Resurrection	Arrangement ("Martial Medicine")
2006	Bullet Witch	Sound director; vocal arrangements
2006	Ridge Racer 2	Music ("Paris Remix")
2006	Ridge Racer 7	Music ("Hard Drive" and "Onyx")
2007	Resident Evil: The Umbrella Chronicles	Sound management
2008	Beatmania IIDX 14: Gold CS	Music ("Playball")
2008	KORG DS-10	Design with Yasunori Mitsuda
2008	Beatmania IIDX 15: DJ Troopers CS	Music ("Sidechained Threats")
2009	BQLSI STAR LASER	Sound design
2009	KORG DS-10 PLUS	Design with Yasunori Mitsuda
2010	LightBike 2	Music
2010	Criminal Girls	Music ("I Love You")
2010	KORG M01	Design with Yasunori Mitsuda
2010	Taiko no Tatsujin 14	Music ("Taiko Time")
2011	Taiko no Tatsujin Portable DX	Vocals ("Boku wa Synth")
2011	Tekken Tag Tournament 2	Arcade version; music with various others
2011	Ridge Racer	Music ("Virtuoso")
2012	iYM2151	Design
2012	Ridge Racer Unbounded	Music ("Down & Under")
2012	Super Monkey Ball: Banana Splitz	Music with various others
2012	Orgarhythm	Music ("Algorithm")
2012	Tekken Tag Tournament 2	Console versions; music with various others
2012	maimai PLUS	Arrangement ("Space Harrier Main Theme [Reborn]")
2013	Tekken Revolution	Music ("Lunar Fringe Theories")
2013	KORG M01D	Design
2013	Drakengard 3	Music ("Exhaustion 3")
2014	KORG DSN-12	Design
2014	TorqueL	Music
2015	Tekken 7	Arcade version; music ("The Day Before the Glass Matrix")
2015	Cosmic Break 2	Music
2015	Groove Coaster 2 Original Style	Music with various others
2017	Kakuriyo no Mon	Music ("Yosen Hirasaka")
2017	Dragon Quest XI: Echoes of an Elusive Age	Sound direction
2017	Moeyo! Kung-Fu Lady Dragon	Music ("Kokaku Stage (Seiryumon)")
2019	Beatmania IIDX 27: Heroic Verse	Music ("Duration")
2021	Nier Replicant ver.1.22474487139...	Audio supervision
2022	Alice Gear Aegis: Special Space Operation Op. Hellebore	Music
2023	Teravit	Music with various others
2024	Tekken 8	Music ("Hangar Rules")
TBA	Clive is a Good Guy	Music
