= New Space Order =

Unreleased arcade video game

- Logo
- Developer: Project Starline
- Publisher: Namco Bandai Games
- Director: Toru Takahashi
- Platform: Arcade
- Release: Cancelled
- Genre: Real-time strategy
- Mode: Multiplayer
- Arcade system: Namco System N2

New Space Order (Note: Japanese: ニュースペースオーダー, Hepburn: Nyū Supēsu Ōdā) is an unreleased real-time strategy arcade game under development by Namco Bandai Games for Japan. Controlling a fleet of battleships, players would explore the void of space to gather resources and fight off enemy fleets and destroy entire planets. Players could construct network systems to distribute resources to other players and construct new ship types to deploy into battle. The plot involves an intergalactic organization, the United Galaxy Space Force, discovering an unknown extraterrestrial species that plans to wipe out all of mankind. It was made for the Namco System N2 arcade board.

Development of the game was done by internal development group "Project Starline", led by Toru Takahashi. Inspired by the Age of Empires series, the team wanted to create a game that would help set a standard for Japanese online games, which were deemed inferior in quality to those overseas. The game was meant to be part of Namco's fictional "United Galaxy Space Force" saga and used ships and settings from other Namco video games, including Galaxian, Galaga, Xevious and Starblade. Beta testing for the game was exclusive to Namco-operated café chains in Japan. New Space Order was shown off at the 2007 Amusement Operators Union (AOU) tradeshow, which was followed by a tie-in anime series, New Space Order: Link of Life. Updates for the game would continue to decrease in the years following, and development was officially ceased in 2009 with little to no explanation.

== Gameplay ==
Pre-release screenshot, showing the player attacking a fleet of enemies and their home planet

New Space Order was described as a "Namco space opera". Up to eight players controlled a fleet of battleships as they must explore the universe in search of the "enemy star". Ships included large-scale war machines, small drones and turret guns. Similar to the Age of Empires series, the map will begin as entirely black, revealing more of the world as the player explores. Ships can be deployed to fend off enemy formations approaching the player or their base. A "planet buster" weapon can be deployed against enemy planets to instantly wipe them out, with one taking the form of Zolgear from the arcade game Attack of the Zolgear.

Players could gather resources by exploring space, and could also distribute them to other players through tube-based network systems. Resources could be used to construct new ship types and weapons. Several ships are based on those found in other Namco shooting games, such as Galaxian, Galaga, Star Luster and Ace Combat 3: Electrosphere. A short tutorial was present to teach the player how to play the game. Maps were randomly-generated and could take the form of various designs, including a recreation of the maze from Pac-Man. The game was played using a mouse and keyboard. An IRC card was used to save player progress. The arcade cabinets could be linked together to allow for additional players, the maximum being eight.

== History ==
=== Development ===
New Space Order began development in 2004 by "Project Starline", an internal development group in Namco headed by director Toru Takahashi. Prior to development, most real-time strategy games in Japan had been placed in a negative light for being inferior in quality to those from North America and Europe. Takahashi, a fan of the Age of Empires series, set out to design a similar game in higher quality to help set a standard for future games of its kind in Japan. It was to be Namco's very first real-time strategy game and one of their first online-focused titles. The game was centered around the United Galaxy Space Force universe that combined characters, ships and settings from other Namco titles, including Galaxian, Galaga, Bosconian, Xevious, NebulasRay, Starblade and Ace Combat.

Originally, the game was to instead feature futuristic tank combat instead of large-scale wars in space — although a fan of the idea, Takahashi thought that the space theme was more interesting and could help focus more on combat and strategy. The team had difficulty defining the most important aspects for the game, as Namco had previously never made a game similar to theirs. Takahashi wanted the game to appeal to a wider audience so as to help the game get a foothold in the market. The team also wanted players to work together, leading to the addition of resource-sharing link systems. Beta testing began on August 26, 2004, taking place in Namco-operated cafe chains across Japan.

=== Promotion and cancellation ===
New Space Order was presented at the Amusement Operators Union (AOU) tradeshow in Japan on February 16, 2007, alongside other Namco Bandai titles such as Tekken 6, Mario Kart Arcade GP 2 and Wangan Midnight: Maximum Tune 3, where it had attracted a sizable amount of attention. The game was housed in arcade cabinets previously used for Counter-Strike Neo, fitted with a mouse and keyboard. Despite its attention, critics felt that the game was better-suited as a PC title and didn't feel the idea of a real-time strategy game would fit for arcades, somewhat criticizing Namco Bandai Games for not announcing a PC port of the game. Shortly after the tradeshow, a tie-in anime series, New Space Order: Link of Life, was released exclusively for the game's official website to help explain the story. After a lack of updates for nearly two years, the official website for the game announced its cancellation on January 27, 2009, citing "various circumstances" as its reason.

== Content ==
=== Settings ===
New Space Order is one of the works of the UGSF series established by Bandai Namco Entertainment. As such, General Resource and Neucom Incorporated, which appeared in Ace Combat 3: Electrosphere, make an appearance here. Additionally, units that inherited the settings are GeoCalibur (Starblade: Operation Blue Planet), Dragoon (Galaxian3: Project Dragoon), and Zolgear (Attack of the Zolgear). The short story on the official website also sees involvement with Geosword (Starblade) and Solvalou (Xevious). Furthermore, the Adobe Flash novel New Space Order -Link of Life-, uses the Melnics language which is a language used in Tales of Eternia as a conversational language by one nation. Finally, this is a work that aggregates many Namco game worlds besides the UGSF series.

=== Democratic Union (United Galaxy or U.G.) ===
A governing nation that expanded its habitat with immigrants from Earth. The Democratic Union is the name of the government, its official name is the United Galaxy. In the beginning, it fell into a state of war with the Military Empire. In politics, while the Unity is with the title, it is effectively governed by multinational corporations such as General Resource and Neucom Incorporated. Said multinational corporations also finance its military, the United Galaxy Space Force (UGSF).

Immediately after they made advancement in space, a war aimed at gaining autonomy on the first republic planet (named the 23-Day War) occurred which the Union side won. As a countermeasure, the UGSF was established. In New Space Order -Link of Life-, Earth is already a remote district far away from the political center, like a strategically low-value region. The UGSF is also used in settings of repeated fighting with a variety of enemies (such as Bosconians and Galaga) that appear in games produced by Namco. These forces are not treated in the game because of their encounter in the second half of the game story (in addition to Earth being in a remote area, the operational ship that is supposed to have been completed at the end of the war for Solvalou) or because they are treated as a "quasi-cataclysm-level threat." (still, it is a setting that operated the Special Attack Team, or "SAT," by spending a fleet-sized budget (back money)).

In -Link of Life-, four SAT Dragoons were secretly advancing on Earth and it was planned to annihilate both the Imperials and the then-unknown Sacred Religious State. The unit balances the cost and performance, which made it easy to handle. Additionally, spacecraft were set to be the strongest of all nations, most relevant to other works of the UGSF series such as the GeoCalibur 2, the successor to the GeoSword, and the Dragoon IDS, the mass-produced successor of the original Dragoon.

=== Military Empire ===
Though the intention is unknown, the Military Empire is inscribed as "帝國" and not "帝国." It is said that this is a codename given by the United Galaxy from the political system found by language analysis. The official name is "Ola Garucelic zo Ahous." It is a nation governed by a single person called the "Supreme Ruler."

Originally, there were several nations. However, all of them were unified through a war sparked by the Supreme Ruler called the "United War." The Supreme Leader seems to be a guaranteed centennial during the New Space Order War. It has a military-centric culture that closely resembles Nazi Germany and Imperial Japan in World War II and developed in science from the military. The design is also modeled after World War II battleships and aircraft carriers. Its internal affairs and governance are stable. After foreseeing threats such as invasions from outer space and advancing into space and eliminating said threats by rearmament, it fell into a state of war with the United Galaxy.

ESP abilities are called "Dorkt" and they are used as military application power and perceived as "made to do." The people of Ahous cannot use telepathy or any other abilities. Instead, they use it to boost human senses, can range in outer space only visually in Earth's World War I, and can perform sub-light artillery battles only by the captain and artillery officer's own calculations. Although it is "limited," the ESP ability is expressed to all citizens only in the four nations, and its use of difficulty is low enough to be used "on a daily basis though it is tiresome." Therefore, a soldier's degree of training and accumulated experience is not the ratio of other countries and that the computing power is comparable to the UG's high-performance computers. Because of this, most of the weapons are peaky which depends on the skill of the individual.

It uses a language that has evolved from the Xevi language that was used in Xevious (though, it is said that the Xevi language itself is instilled in another knowledge by some force). There are many words in items related to the Military Empire. In -Link of Life- online mechanics, the Xevi language (Ancient Pan-Galactic Official Language) and Old Norse are linguistically combined. The unit is a small number of elite types with a high cost and high performance. In addition, by going through the event, a conversion to a weapon with a lot of live ammunition equipment is made. There are many battleships that are resistant to invasions from the side. The above mechanics has the ship's setting, but it appears to be manufactured by craftsman-based industries.

=== Sacred Religious State ===
Like the Military Empire, the official name is "Celestia tian Farous." The Sacred Religious State itself does not rely on science. Instead, it is made up of deciphering and reproducing the completed techniques of "scriptures" which were transmitted from ancient times. It is said that in the distant ancient times, many planets flourished under an ancient civilization with a Star-Line-like setup, like the parallel Tales of Eternia world. When it comes to weapons, they are living organisms in which each group had autonomous actions. However, due to the failure to produce the brain necessary for autonomy, they have ESP holders called "operators" on board and move it by telepathy (similarly to operating with ESP or the UG Coffin System). As a result, the number of crew members is small (with -Link of Life- setting it at 1 to 2 persons per ship. Alternatively, it may represent the number of personnel required to keep one ship operational).

When inserted into the organism's nucleus, the operator stops time and keeps youth eternally. This is an adjustment to stably maintain the ESP capability. The planet buster of the Sacred Religious State uses the Zolgear as a supermassive living weapon which was the enemy boss of Galaxian 3: Attack of the Zolgear. But it is half different in the setting revealed in the mechanics. However, along with the UG, the settings of past Namco games, such as the Ilu Dorkt armor and the parallel world of Eternia, are often diverted.

As for the culture, it resembles the Middle Ages, early modern Europe, and mystique.It uses the Melnics language as the official language which was also used in Tales of Eternia. It had been in hostilities with the State of Feudal Dynasty for many years, but after an incident in the Link of Life novel, it has a friendly connection with the UG. through the rescue of people in distress like Airuya.

Given that there is little interactions due to physical isolations, some Sacred Religious People seem to be naturalized in the UG and the top aces throughout the war (= ESP users) included half of the Sacred Religious People. The unit is relatively expensive, but it has the fastest mobility out of all nations and it has special attacks such as the Kirlian Beam which attacks the enemies by penetrating the body. By the way, it is also depicted in the column on the official website, and it also the homeland of New Space Order's mascot, "Yutta."

=== State of Feudal Dynasty ===
The most scientifically advanced nation. The official name is "Tiencho zo Refous." On Twitter, it is revealed by the setting producer, Hisaharu Tago, that the State of Feudal Dynasty is the distant future of Mirai Ninja. The Diastasion Drive (Dimensional Particle Manipulation Technology which was used as a three-dimensional tank paddle) is already in its own right two centuries ahead of the UG It has also experience advancements in space and sector warfare earlier than any other nations. The official language is based on Cantonese. Literally, the government is made up feudalistic states. However, the majority of the people do not even know the existence of the latest science. It is ruled by the "Emperor" and the four princes through the war called, "War of the Twelve Lords," which occurred after the advancement to space.

The commander of the Dynastic Imperial Army (the Emperor's only army and the player's so-called army) is bound by various constraints such as tradition and style in order to suppress rebellions by using their scientific power due to the many princes of valor. Its science and technology are transmitted only in the dynastic centers (in the case of the Sacred Religious State, it is self-study) and engineers who are given said technology are forbidden from elucidating the research. Any violator is erased. Weapons are also bound to tradition and style because of their useless decorations. Some of the masses do not understand that they are entering space in the first place.

The life ship of the Sacred Religious State, being seen in battles, where the living nucleus containing the operator is named a "Ball," in which various princes secured it as a medal (in the official blog, a ban was issued during the time of the second age emperor and in the time of the third emperor). The post ban treatment has seen many of the balls that were destroyed return to their homeland. In some cases however, both Curia and Cain were resuscitated and did not return to their homeworld, choosing instead to serve as an aide to the emperor, like Airuya. The unit is low cost with a low performance, but it has a mass production to compensate for it. Additionally, when compared to other nations, there are many units with a strong habit of being handled differently. The design in quite different from the box hull with oars and huge female images on the deck.
