= Technicbeat =

2002 video game

- Developer: Arika
- Publishers: JP: Arika; NA: Mastiff
- Director: Kiminori Tsubouchi
- Producer: Ichirō Mihara
- Designers: Kiminori Tsubouchi; Ryuji Mikawa
- Programmers: Hiroshi Nakamura; Yukio Yoshida; Yoshiyuki Imano
- Composers: Shinji Hosoe; Ayako Saso; Yousuke Yasui; Hiroto Saitō; Norihiro Furukawa
- Platforms: Arcade, PlayStation 2
- Release: Arcade: JP: July 2002; PlayStation 2: JP: November 7, 2002; NA: November 2, 2004
- Genre: Music
- Modes: Single-player, multiplayer
- Arcade system: Namco System 246

Technic Beat (テクニクビート, Tekuniku Bīto) is an arcade music video game developed by Arika. It is a sequel to the PlayStation 2 game Technictix. The PlayStation 2 version of Technic Beat was published in North America by Mastiff. It was released in Japan in 2002 and the United States in 2004. In this game, players select a song from a preset list and then "play" their chosen song using their on-screen character.

== Gameplay ==
Most of Technic Beat's gameplay takes place on a square-shaped area called a "stage". During gameplay, circle-shaped "markers" appear on the stage. When these markers first appear, a small circle appears in the center of each marker and then expands like a ripple toward the marker's outer edge. The player's goal is to "activate" all the markers that appear by placing their on screen character on top of the marker and pressing a button when the marker's inner circle overlaps its outer edge.

Each marker that appears on the stage corresponds to a note or set of notes in the player's selected song. If the player successfully activates a marker, it will play its corresponding note(s) and then disappear. If the player does not activate a marker before the marker's inner circle has expanded past its outer edge, they are considered to have "missed" the marker, and the marker will disappear.

Every time a player activates a marker, they receive a ranking depending on how well they timed their activation. The ranks in order from best to worst are: perfect, great, good, and bad. A bad ranking is also given when a player misses a marker.

Similar to the groove gauge in Beatmania, Technic Beat has a "tension indicator" to notify a player of how well they are performing. This indicator fills when a player activates a marker and empties when they miss a marker. In order to "pass" a song, the player must fill their tension indicator past a certain point, known as the "clear line". If the player's tension indicator is not filled past the clear line at the end of the song, they will get a game over.

In addition to normal activation, markers can also be activated by using "chains". If two markers overlap, and one of them is successfully activated, the second marker will become "reserved". Reserved markers play automatically, without any player action. A reserved marker will also reserve any markers touching it. Thus, by activating one of several overlapped markers, players can form a chain of reserved markers. A player can also create a "chord" by activating two or more non-touching markers at the same time.

At the end of each song, the player is rewarded with points based on their accuracy, their timing, and the number of chains and chords formed.

== Characters ==
Technic Beat has six playable characters. Each character has a unique "action" that allows that character to move markers from one place to another. In addition, each character also has their own individual "super action" that can only be used a certain amount of times depending on the game mode. All six characters are listed below:

- Knitty is a small, striped creature with two balloon-like ears. Her normal action allows her to pick up a single marker and carry it to another location. Knitty's super action creates a large marker, called "Marker King", that, when activated, will activate all other markers touching it.
- Rain is a little girl wearing a dress that has pigtails. Her normal action allows her to pick up and move a single marker. Rain can't move as fast when she is carrying a marker, but the marker will grow bigger while she is carrying it. Her super action makes all the markers on the screen larger.
- Hassy is a platypus that wears a snorkel and swinfins. Hassy's normal action makes him slide across the screen, activating any marker that he runs over. When he uses is super action, he increases in size and activates any marker he touches.
- Bot is a tiny clockwork robot. His normal action allows him to pick up and move a single marker. The marker grows bigger when bot carries it without moving, and when he moves he will get incredibly fast, but the marker will shrink in size. Bot's super move allows him to shoot a laser beam that activates any marker that it touches.
- Willie is a large teddy bear that wears a scarf. He is the slowest of all the characters, but his normal action allows him to pick up and move multiple markers at once, he also becomes slightly faster when carrying a marker. His super action creates a circular wave that activates any marker that it touches.
- Cart is a man who wears a suit and carries a keyboard on his back. Cart's normal action allows him to kick a marker, moving it in the direction he is facing. His super action creates a reserved marker that he can kick around the stage to reserve other markers.

== Music ==
Technic Beat contains seventy-three unique songs. The music selection covers a wide range of electronic music, including trance, techno, and drum 'n bass. The game also contains remixes of songs from classic Namco games, including Mappy, Dig Dug, Galaxian 3, Burning Force, along with Arika's earlier Street Fighter EX.

== Reception ==
Reception

Aggregate score
Aggregator	Score
Metacritic	67/100

Review scores
Publication	Score
Famitsu	32/40
Game Informer	7.5/10
GameSpy	3/5
GamesTM	7/10
GameZone	7.5/10
IGN	7.5/10
Official U.S. PlayStation Magazine	3/5
PlayStation: The Official Magazine	8/10
X-Play	2/5

The PlayStation 2 version received "average" reviews according to the review aggregation website Metacritic. In Japan, Famitsu gave it a score of 32 out of 40. IGN gave it a favorable review over a month before its U.S. release date.
