= Metal Hawk =

1988 video game

- Japanese flyer
- Developer: Namco
- Publisher: Namco
- Composer: Shinji Hosoe
- Platform: Arcade
- Release: JP: October 1988; NA: September 1989; AU: 1989
- Genre: Multidirectional shooter
- Mode: Single-player
- Arcade system: Namco System 2

Metal Hawk (Note: Japanese: メタルホーク, Hepburn: Metaru Hōku) is a 1988 multidirectional shooter video game developed and published by Namco for arcades. Assuming control of the titular attack helicopter, the player is tasked with using a machine gun and air-to-surface missiles to destroy enemies and earn a certain number of points before the timer runs out, all while avoiding collision with ether enemy projectiles and obstacles. The Metal Hawk can change its altitude to allow it to either rise higher in the air or lower towards the ground. It runs on the Namco System 2 arcade board.

Metal Hawk was one of the first games to be developed under Namco's then-new research and development (R&D) video game division in Japan. The development staff focused on creating a game that was both fun to play and exhilarating, and one with powerful, impressive hardware capabilities, specifically in its motion simulator arcade cabinet. Shinji Hosoe composed the game's soundtrack with assistance from Kazuo Noguchi; early versions had additional sound and instrument channels with a more upbeat vibe; these channels had to be removed later on due to a lack of hardware space. Japanese voice actress Maya Okamoto served as the voice of the operator, which provides commentary during levels.

Metal Hawk was produced in limited quantities due to production costs regarding the cabinet; despite this, it proved to be a commercial success, and remained one of the most popular arcade games at the time. Critics commended the game for its fast-paced gameplay, impressive graphics and immersive arcade cabinet, with one critic labeling it was Namco's next "blockbuster" video game. Several have also compared the game heavily to Sega's Thunder Blade, with many finding Metal Hawk to be superior. A home port of the game for the Sega CD was rumored to be in development but later cancelled.

== Gameplay ==
Gameplay screenshot

Metal Hawk is a multi-directional shooter video game, described as a cross between Namco's own Assault and Sega's Thunder Blade. Assuming control of the titular attack helicopter, the player is tasked with scoring a certain number of points in each level before the countdown timer runs out. Gameplay involves shooting down enemies and avoiding collision with either their projectiles or the ground below. The Metal Hawk is equipped with a machine gun for destroying air-based enemies and air-to-surface missiles for destroying ground-based enemies. Enemies awards points when destroyed, and earning the required number of points will allow the player to progress to the next level. An arrow icon will point in the direction of the nearest enemy. The Metal Hawk can change its altitude via a throttle lever attached to the arcade cabinet, allowing it to either rise higher into the air or lower towards the ground, which is used for destroying air and ground-based enemies. The map rotates around the player, who remains in the center of the screen at all times, a concept previously used in Assault.

== Development and release ==
The arcade cabinet for Metal Hawk, a motion simulator machine that moved based on player input, was an integral part of production.

By the mid-1980s, Japanese video game developer Namco quickly rose to become one of Japan's leading video game developers, creating hit titles such as The Tower of Druaga (1984), Pac-Land (1984), Metro-Cross (1985) and Rolling Thunder (1986). The success of these titles generated a lot of income for the company, who began to set up a new research and development (R&D) division for future hardware endeavors, aiming to help create unique, interesting new coin-op games. Metal Hawk was one of the first games produced under this new division, alongside Assault (1988). It was produced for the Namco System 2 arcade system, which also powered titles such as Burning Force, Valkyrie no Densetsu, Finest Hour and Cosmo Gang the Video.

When designing the game, Namco primarily focused on the game's technological capabilities; most notable of these is the arcade cabinet, a motion-based machine that rocked back and forth based on the player's actions in the game. Production documents also heavily focused on the game's controls, specifically its analogue joystick, which was to help make sure the controls themselves were smooth, responsive, and easy-to-use for players. The development staff also made sure the gameplay itself was intense and fun to play, instead of being overshadowed by the hardware itself.

Shinji Hosoe composed the soundtrack for Metal Hawk, with assistance from fellow composer Kazuo Noguchi. In early test versions, the soundtrack had a much more upbeat tempo and a wide array of sound and instrument channels; as development progressed the arcade hardware was unable to store so many sound channels alongside everything else, leading to several of these channels being cut to free up ROM space. Hosoe sees Metal Hawk as one of his defining games for his time at the company. Japanese voice actress Maya Okamoto served as the voice of the operator, which provides commentary during levels.

Metal Hawk was released in October 1988 in Japan. It was later released in September 1989 in North America, and sometime in the year in Australia. Namco showed off the game at the 1988 Amusement Machine exposition in December, presented alongside other games such as Splatterhouse, Ordyne, Mirai Ninja and Pro Tennis: World Court. The game itself was produced in limited quantities, a fact attributed to the high production costs of the cabinet; as such, original Metal Hawk arcade units and boards are very rare and considered prized collector's items. A home conversion for the Sega CD was believed to be in production but later cancelled.

== Reception ==
Reception

Review score
Publication	Score
Sinclair User	9/10

Despite a low production run, Metal Hawk proved to be a commercial success. The September 1990 issue of Leisure Line magazine reported the game to be the seventh most-popular coin-op game of the year, outdoing both Out Run and After Burner. In Japan, Game Machine listed it as being the sixth most-successful cockpit/sitdown arcade unit of the year.

The game was well received by critics. The Games Machine referred to it as a "remarkable flight sensation", while Amstrad Computer User labeled it a "sure-fire winner" and Namco's next major "blockbuster" arcade game. Many publications greatly focused on the gameplay, and commended it for its speed and fast-paced action. Computer + Video Games claimed that "lots of excitement and a thrilling ride are guaranteed if you're man enough to ride the Metal Hawk. Both Sinclair User and The Games Machine applauded its gameplay for its sense of thrill, speed, and action, with Sinclair User concluding their review with: "Mind boggling technical effects meet simple fast-action gameplay - this is a winner all the way!" The graphics were also the subject of praise; Sinclair User in particular appreciated its multi-layered background designs and "mouth openingly astonishing" rotation effects. Many publications heavily compared Metal Hawk to the game Thunder Blade (1987), with most feeling it was superior than Sega's offering. Critics also commended the Metal Hawk arcade cabinet for its impressive, immersive design and motion-based features adding to the game's fast-paced and intense gameplay.

Retrospectively in 2008, Sega-16 compared the game's graphics to Konami's A-Jax and its gameplay to Namco's own Assault, alongside the Namco System 2 hardware for its impressive sprite and background scaling techniques. They expressed disappointment towards the cancellation of the rumored Sega CD version, writing "Metal Hawk’s scaling makes it a perfect fit (and a perfect showcase) for what the CD hardware can do, and it sadly give us yet another game to ponder" and noting that it and Namco's other arcade titles could have potentially sparked additional interest and hope into the add-on.
