= Driving Emotion Type-S =

2000 racing video game developed by Escape

- European cover art featuring BMW 328ci (E46)
- Developer: Escape
- Publishers: JP: Square; NA: Square Electronic Arts; EU: Electronic Arts
- Director: Toru Ikebuchi
- Producer: Shinji Hashimoto
- Composer: Shinji Hosoe
- Platform: PlayStation 2
- Release: JP: March 30, 2000; EU: January 19, 2001; NA: January 30, 2001
- Genre: Racing
- Modes: Single-player, multiplayer

Driving Emotion Type-S (Note: Japanese: ドライビング・エモーション・タイプエス, Hepburn: Doraibingu Emōshon Taipu Esu) is a racing game developed by Escape and published by Square. It was published in Japan on March 30, 2000 and was Square's first release for the PlayStation 2 console. After criticisms of the game's handling, the international versions feature revised controls and additional contents, and were released in January 2001 by Square Electronic Arts in North America and Electronic Arts in Europe.

The game features officially licensed cars from international manufacturers. Several modes of playing are present, including a training mode and a two-player mode. The game's music, primarily composed by Shinji Hosoe, was published as a soundtrack in Japan. Sales for the game were low and professional reviews very mixed, with either praises or criticism of the game's graphics, controls and sounds.

== Gameplay ==
The game's interface depicts information about the race, as well as a mini-map and speedometer. The player is here driving a Honda Civic Type R.

The gameplay of Driving Emotion Type-S follows general conventions of racing games. The game's physics and controls intend to be realistic and are based on vehicular weight. The player competes in races with other computer-controlled cars in order to unlock new cars and tracks. Car settings can be customized, as well as their colors, before each course. Driving Emotion Type-S includes 43 officially licensed cars with a variety range from Import scene cars, Luxury Cars and Exotic Car from Eight Japanese and Five European manufacturers, including BMW, Toyota, Honda, (Note: The Honda Integra and NSX were sold under the Acura nameplate in North America.) Nissan, (Note: The Nissan Primera was sold as Infiniti G20 in North America.) Mazda, Porsche, Subaru, Mitsubishi, TVR, Alfa Romeo, Ferrari, and Lexus which was exclusive to the Western versions of the game. Fourteen courses are available in total, including two fictional circuit and three real circuit including Suzuka Circuit, (Note: In Grand Prix circuit and East circuit configuration.) and Tsukuba Circuit, (Note: Including Tsukuba 2000 course configuration and four autocross tracks.) and one exclusive to the Western versions of the game called West Coast.

There are four game modes. The "Arcade Type-S" mode is the main part of the game, and allows the player to immediately join a race. Only four cars (three in western release) are available at the beginning of the game, but as the player wins more races, more cars and tracks are unlocked. The "Line Training" mode enables the player to try out any of the tracks and improve their driving techniques, without any computer-controlled car. An ideal racing line is shown in red on the track and becomes jagged when the suggested braking points are approached. This mode features four autocross tracks that do not feature in the other modes. A "Time Attack" and split-screen two-player "Vs Mode" fill out the gameplay. (Note: Both Time Attack and Vs Mode features the Oval and Dragstrip configuration of the Japan Automobile Research Institute "Tsukuba Proving Grounds" that do not feature in both "Arcade Type-S" and "Line Training" modes.)

== Development ==
Announced in January 2000 under the working title of Type-S, Driving Emotion Type-S was developed by Escape, a subsidiary of Square. Its development team had previously worked with DreamFactory on Ehrgeiz and the Tobal series for the PlayStation. The announcement was later followed by a four-page advertisement in the Japanese gaming magazine Weekly Famitsu, which stated that the game would be Square's first release for the PlayStation 2.

In Japan, a playable demo was showcased at Square's "Millennium Event", a show held in January 2000 at Yokohama Arena. Teaser adverts of the game were among the first ones to air in Japan for the systems (the teaser featuring the Porsche 911 GT3 (996.1) and Ferrari 360 Modena). The game was also showcased in the United States at the Electronic Entertainment Expo at Los Angeles Convention Center, from May 11–13 of the same year. This demonstration was not playable however, as focus groups were revising the game to improve upon the Japanese version. According to GameSpot, the level of body details and shading was also refined. The international versions of the game were eventually released ten months after the Japanese version.

== Soundtrack ==
Driving Emotion Type-S Original Soundtrack

Soundtrack album by Shinji Hosoe, Ayako Saso, and Takayuki Aihara
- Released: December 29, 2001
- Genre: Video game music
- Length: 59:52
- Label: Super Sweep

Professional ratings
Review scores
Source	Rating
Chudah's Corner	(A+)

The music of the game was primarily composed by Shinji Hosoe, with contributions by Ayako Saso and Takayuki Aihara. The soundtrack was published in Japan by Hosoe's label Super Sweep Records, on December 29, 2001, and was sold bundled with the soundtrack of the video game Bushido Blade. The music is mostly techno-based, with rock and jazz elements. According to the game music website Chudah's Corner, one of the more varied track is the opener "Rush About", which features electronic beats, a duet of saxophone and electric guitar, and a piano. The site also mentions the synth-influenced "Best Tone" and its bass solo as Ayako Saso's most enjoyable contribution, while Takayuki Aihara's is the catchy 80s rock tune "F-Beat". Finally, the site cites the piano-based "Recollections of Sepia" as the calmest track of the album.

"Rush About"
13-second sample from the game's opening theme.

All tracks are written by Shinji Hosoe, except where noted.

Track list
No.	Title	Writer(s)	Length
1.	"Rush About"		2:11
2.	"Stray"		1:12
3.	"A Light Turn"		4:35
4.	"Best Tone"	Ayako Saso	5:17
5.	"F-Beat"	Takayuki Aihara	5:13
6.	"Shake Off"	Ayako Saso	2:46
7.	"Heavy Way"		4:46
8.	"Wild Feeling"	Ayako Saso	4:24
9.	"Pass Through"		5:24
10.	"Back Swing"	Takayuki Aihara	4:35
11.	"Power"		4:16
12.	"Insomnia Operation"		4:24
13.	"Challenge to a Limit"	Ayako Saso	4:51
14.	"Recollections of Sepia"		2:16
15.	"To the Whirlpool of Light"		2:25
16.	"Internal-Organs"		0:32
17.	"Complication"		0:45

== Reception ==
=== Critical response ===
Reception

Aggregate score
Aggregator	Score
Metacritic	55/100

Review scores
Publication	Score
AllGame	2.5 out of 5
Edge	4 out of 10
Electronic Gaming Monthly	5.67 out of 10 (Note: In Electronic Gaming Monthly's review of the game, two critics gave it each a score of 6/10, and the other gave it 5/10.)
EP Daily	5 out of 10
Famitsu	28 out of 40
Game Informer	8 out of 10
GameFan	(MVS) 64% 61% (Note: In GameFan's viewpoint of the Japanese import, three critics gave it each a score of 65, 70, and 49.)
GameRevolution	D+
GameSpot	7.3 out of 10
GameZone	7 out of 10
IGN	7 out of 10
Next Generation	(US) 2 out of 5 (JP) 1 out of 5
Official U.S. PlayStation Magazine	2.5 out of 5

The game received "mixed or average" reviews, according to the review aggregation website Metacritic. In Japan, Weekly Famitsu gave the title a score of 28 out of 40, praising its graphics, usage of real cars and innovative driver's view perspective. Game Informer and GameZone also lauded the game's realistic car interiors and highly detailed environments, putting them on par with those of Ridge Racer V and Gran Turismo 3: A-Spec. Still, AllGame noted the presence of a subtle shimmering effect in the graphics, an effect typically seen on early PlayStation 2 titles, while GameRevolution found the graphics "severely jagged". The shimmering and jaggedness were also noted by GameSpot and IGN, which did not feel they were that irritating.

The game's car interior view was praised for its detail. The player is here driving a Mitsubishi FTO GP Version R.

Concerning the game's playability, the Japanese release was judged "impossible to play" by GameSpot and IGN; both found the international release an improvement, even though it was still "far more sensitive than it ought to be". Still, GameRevolution found the car default settings unbalanced and hard to re-adjust properly, and criticized the game's inconsistent AI, like AllGame and IGN. Famitsu reported long load times and a high difficulty level, noting that the game was aimed more toward fans of sim racing than fans of arcade-style gameplay, due to the difficulty of steering. Game Informer and GameZone echoed Famitsu's review, stating that the load times quickly become a "game-ending nightmare", and calling the game's handling "touchy", "intense" and "revolutionary", but acknowledging that most players would simply find it too challenging and frustrating to be fun. While Game Informer alleged that "there is a masterpiece for driving simulator buffs buried in here", AllGame was much more negative, stating that the cars "seem overly light on their tires" and that it "feels like you're driving on ice".

Reviews for the game's audio were also mixed. The music was praised by Chudah's Corner, which called it the game's "saving grace" and "a marvel of its own", while Game Informer called it "decent" but felt Square should have enlisted big bands to match the music of the competitor series Gran Turismo. GameSpot called the music "solid, albeit imperfect" and also thought that it lacked impact compared to that of Gran Turismo 2, R4: Ridge Racer Type 4 or Ridge Racer V. While the site praised the game's ambient sound effects as realistic and detailed, IGN and GameZone felt they were too muted and "nothing special". GameZone, GameRevolution and GamePro felt the music was "intolerable" and "out-of-tune", "cheesy and annoying", and sounded like "a flock of seagulls being maimed and tortured". (Note: GamePro gave the game 4/5 for graphics, 1.5/5 for sound, 2/5 for control, and 2.5/5 for fun factor.)

Randy Nelson of NextGen's June 2000 issue called the Japanese import a pure concept racer with brief glimpses of technical brilliance, but was critical to its awkward controls and a dissatisfying lack of structure. Nine issues later, however, he said that the U.S. version had some improvements, but noted a play balance and AI problems.

=== Sales ===
A week after its Japanese release, the game had sold 46,600 units. It made a more mediocre start outside Japan, with only 2,500 units sold in the U.S. a week after its release. AllGame noted that while the game sold poorly, it nevertheless benefited commercially from having been released before Gran Turismo 3: A-Spec, which received "universal acclaim" from critics, and became a best-selling PlayStation 2 title until Grand Theft Auto: San Andreas was released.
