= Numan Athletics =

1993 video game

- Japanese arcade flyer
- Developer: Namco
- Publisher: Namco
- Composer: Nobuyoshi Sano
- Platform: Arcade
- Release: JP: September 1993; NA: December 1993
- Genre: Sports
- Modes: Single-player, multiplayer

Numan Athletics (Note: Japanese: ニューマンアスレチックス, Hepburn: Nyūman Asurechikkusu) is a 1993 sports video game developed and published by Namco for arcades. It was released in Japan in September 1993, and in North America later that December. It is similar to Konami's 1983 game Track & Field. The game later went on to spawn a sequel, Mach Breakers, in 1995.

== Gameplay ==
In-game screenshot of the "Interceptor" event.

Each of the eight events takes place in a different country, and the Numans' journey is charted by a Knuckle Heads-style compere (along with his two "bunny girls", who come up from the bottom of the screen when a Numan succeeds in some, but not all, of the events). If a player gets the best time (or distance) in any event, it shall be a "world record", after which the player is prompted to input their initials. The events are:

- Turbo Dash: Set in the United States (Harry's home country), the player must use the first and third buttons to make their Numan start running, and try to beat the other player's.
- Interceptor: Set in Russia, this event is similar to the Firing Ranges from Konami's Combat School; the player must use the first and third buttons to make their Numan walk left and right and the second one to fire at bullets launched by a distant boat. If a bullet hits the ground, it explodes and blows the Numan into the water, thus automatically failing the event. If a bullet hits a Numan, it blows all the clothes off, also resulting in an event failure.
- Missile Toss: Set in Kenya (Bongo's home country), the player must use the first and third buttons to make their Numan start running, then press and hold the second button before the red line (if any part of the Numan's feet goes over the line, it invalidates the attempt); this event can be extremely difficult for players who do not know exactly when to stop and which angle to throw a missile.
- Numan Sniper: Set in Antarctica, the player must use all three of their buttons to fire at monsters on the left side, in the centre of, and on the right side of the screen; this event is similar to Interceptor (only with up to every Numan simultaneously).
- Vs. Express: Set in Japan (Masaemon's home country), the player must press the second button when a red light in the top-right corner of the screen and a Shinkansen comes into view from the right side of it, then alternate pressing the first and third ones to build up their Numan's power meter, then push it back off the right side of the screen again. If the player cannot press the second button before the Shinkansen hits their Numan, the Shinkansen's impact will send the Numan flying, therefore automatically failing the event.
- Tower Topper: Set in France (Sharon's home country), the player must use the second button to make their Numan jump from one building to the other before a flame under the feet disappears; if it does, the Numan falls to the ground and automatically fails the event.
- Nonstop Rock Chop: Set in Australia, the player must use the first and third buttons to build up their Numan's power meters, then press the second one to punch into the rocks and destroy them. Pressing the second button while the power meter is not full will cause the Numan's hand to be stuck in the rock.
- Niagara Jumps: Set in Zambia, the player must use the first and third buttons to make their Numan start running to the right, then press the second one to jump "onto" the Falls and press it twice more to cross them; the Numans also still have to cross the blue line on the other side of the Falls. Timing the jumps is critical in this event; wrong timing will cause the Numan to splash into the Falls and drown. After this event, the Numans' results will be tabulated, and any of them who did not make it to the end will be classified as "retired", while the one who came first will become the subject of the game's ending sequence: there are four ending sequences, one for each Numan.

== Reception ==
Numan Athletics was one of the most popular arcade games in Japan in the month of October 1993. In North America, weekly location test earnings averaged $247 per unit.

Electronic Games commended the game for its fierce, competitive nature and strange concept, saying that it would "test anyone's physical endurance". Italian publication Computer+Videogiochi agreed, further praising the game for sticking out among similar titles for its outlandish design, entertaining gameplay, and amount of in-game events. They also liked its colorful visuals and soundtrack, alongside its multiplayer components.

Reviewing the Japanese Wii Virtual Console version, Nintendo Life praised Numan Athletics for its competitive nature and uniqueness, and found it to be a surprising "treasure" for the service. They wrote: "Numan Athletics is the distilled essence of what makes arcade games so exciting – it's over the top, noisy, bold – and fun". Retro Gamer gave a similar response, comparing it favorably to Sega's DecAthlete and Konami's Hyper Sports for its unique and outlandish concept, alongside its entertaining, button-mashing gameplay. They concluded their review saying: "The premise doesn't change a whole lot in gameplay terms – at the end of the day, you're still going to spend most of your time hammering away at buttons – but it's as tight and enjoyable as the best in the genre, holding up well alongside the likes of Hyper Sports and DecAthlete". Game Watch applauded its "exhilarating" gameplay and "gorgeous" presentation, and said that its 4-person multiplayer made it a great party game. They also liked the techno soundtrack and responsive controls.
