= Shinji Hosoe =

Japanese composer (born 1967)

- 細江 慎治
- Born: February 28, 1967 (age 59); Gero, Gifu Prefecture, Japan
- Other names: Megaten; Sampling Masters MEGA
- Occupations: Composer; musician; producer
- Years active: 1985–present
- Employers: Namco (1985–1996); Arika (1996–2000); SuperSweep (2000–present)
- Musical career
- Genres: Techno; rave; trance; electro; gabber; jazz fusion; synthpop; video game music
- Instruments: Piano; synthesizer
- Labels: Troubadour Records; SuperSweep

Shinji Hosoe (細江 慎治, Hosoe Shinji; born February 28, 1967), also known as Megaten and Sampling Masters MEGA, is a Japanese video game composer and musician most famous for scoring Ridge Racer, Street Fighter EX and many Namco arcade games between 1987 and 1996. He also runs the music production and publishing company SuperSweep, alongside long time collaborator Ayako Saso.

== Biography ==
=== Early life ===
Hosoe was born on February 28, 1967, in Gero, Gifu Prefecture, Japan. His family moved to Chōfu while he was in first grade of elementary school. At the age of 8, he bought Isao Tomita's electronic music album The Planets. He also listened to electronic music by artists such as Yellow Magic Orchestra and Jean-Michel Jarre. During his teenage years, he played bass in a Yellow Magic Orchestra tribute band. At the time, he did not have a serious interest in music and received low grades in music classes. After graduating high school, he studied computer graphics at Japan Electronics College.

=== Namco (1985–1996) ===
Hosoe joined Namco in 1985 as a part-time game tester and CG artist, creating music in his spare time as a hobby. After showing his music to fellow co-workers, he was assigned the position of a composer in 1986. This led to him composing for Dragon Spirit, as well as various other arcade games such as Final Lap, Ordyne and Dirt Fox. He started off tracks by programming a rhythm into the sequencer, then playing melodies with a keyboard on-top, and later adding new parts or re-writing existing parts. In 1990, he composed for Galaxian3: Project Dragoon, working with Ayako Saso for the first time.

Using the pseudonym Yuji Yamada, he also composed for games that were not developed or published by Namco. These include the Little Master series, where director Tadato Kawano asked Hosoe to compose upbeat and happy-styled music. He also composed for the PC-98 game Eye of the Beholder along with Yuzo Koshiro, whose style he tried to imitate for his tracks in the game.

In 1992, Hosoe composed for Fighter & Attacker alongside Takayuki Aihara, his first game project to utilize hardcore techno music. This decision was inspired by hearing hardcore techno CDs that Kawano had provided him, which slowly grew on him. The following year, he composed for Ridge Racer, largely featuring dance music. Due to time constraints, he asked Saso and Nobuyoshi Sano to contribute one track each. The success of Ridge Racer has since led to him receiving many offers from companies to compose similar music. He also composed for Cyber Sled earlier that year, which he considers to be his greatest work, although it received a mixed reception from critics, who criticized it for being repetitive.

=== Arika and SuperSweep (1996–present) ===
Hosoe left Namco to join Arika in 1996, frustrated that his salary was not increasing. Saso and Aihara also joined Arika desiring to continue working with him, although Sano remained at Namco. This led to the trio composing for Street Fighter EX along with its sequels. Ex-Taito composer Yasuhisa Watanabe later joined the sound team. Arika's sound team also composed for games developed by other companies, such as Bushido Blade and Driving Emotion Type-S. The latter game was poorly received by game critics and fans, although the soundtrack has received praise for its blend of fusion, rock and techno music. However, the music also received criticism, with one critic describing it as sounding like "a flock of seagulls being maimed and tortured".

Upon joining Arika, he expressed a desire to eventually found his own game music company, which eventually led to him leaving in 2000 and founding SuperSweep alongside Saso and Watanabe. Yousuke Yasui, who had tried to apply to join Arika, also joined the company as a composer. In addition to composing for games, the company also publishes various soundtracks. One of SuperSweep's first works was the soundtrack of Arika's Technictix in 2001, which Hosoe considers to be one of his most significant contributions to game music. The team also worked on the music of the game's sequel Technic Beat. The game's producer, Ichiro Mihara, decided that the game's soundtrack would include arrangements of music from earlier Namco and Arika games. Mihara chose which tracks would be included in the game, while the composers decided on which tracks they wanted to remix, at times fighting with others on who would arrange a track.

In 2004, Hosoe and Saso worked on the gameplay soundtrack of Xenosaga Episode II: Jenseits von Gut und Böse, with Yuki Kajiura composing the cutscene music. Kajiura worked entirely separate from Hosoe and Saso, and did not meet during the game's production. For the gameplay tracks, Hosoe composed those with the sound hardware of the PlayStation 2, and opted to use an electronic sound over orchestral due to the limited memory available to work with, in an attempt to mask the difference in sound quality between the gameplay and cutscene soundtracks. His music for the game was poorly received by critics and fans at the time, and were considered unfitting; as a result, he had no interest in releasing a soundtrack CD at the time and did not return to compose for Xenosaga Episode III: Also Sprach Zarathustra, although his work eventually received a more positive reception from fans.

Along with Saso, Kenji Kawai and other composers, he scored Folklore in 2007. The game features a serious, dark cinematic score, which he found easy to compose due to not having to focus on sound design. In 2009, he served as the sole composer of Nine Hours, Nine Persons, Nine Doors, which features dark, intense electronic music. Although he found the composition process straightforward, as it was composed to play on the Nintendo DS sound hardware, Yasui assisted him in ensuring that the music sounded close to the quality of recorded music. He would go on to compose for later titles in the Zero Escape series, including Zero Escape: Virtue's Last Reward in 2012 and Zero Time Dilemma in 2016.

=== Side projects ===
In addition to his career as a composer for games and other media, Hosoe has also participated in a number of side projects. He founded the record label Troubadour Record in 1991. The label released a number of game soundtrack-inspired concept albums, featuring other prolific video game composers such as Hitoshi Sakimoto and Hayato Matsuo, as well as vocal and cover albums. He was also part of the group Oriental Magnetic Yellow (O.M.Y.), parodying Yellow Magic Orchestra, alongside fellow Namco composers Sano, Aihara, and Hiroto Sasaki. The group released several albums and also performed concerts. He has also released albums under the Sampling Masters name with Saso, including the Over Drive Hell series of albums. He has also participated in the Nanosweep album series, which features original tracks by composers from both SuperSweep and Hiroshi Okubo's circle nanosounds.

== Notable works ==
=== Video games ===
==== As lead composer ====
Year	Title	Notes
1987	Dragon Spirit	Music
1987	Final Lap	Music
1987	Quester	Music
1988	Assault	Music with Kazuo Noguchi
1988	Ordyne	Music
1989	Dirt Fox	Music
1990	Final Lap 2	Music
1990	Pistol Daimyo no Bōken	Music with Seiichi Sakurai and Yoshie Takayanagi
1990	Dragon Saber	Music
1990	Galaxian3: Project Dragoon	Music with Ayako Saso
1991	Starblade	Music
1992	Eye of the Beholder	PC-98 version; music with Yuzo Koshiro
1992	Fighter & Attacker	Music with Takayuki Aihara
1993	Cyber Sled	Music
1993	Ridge Racer	Music with Ayako Saso and Nobuyoshi Sano
1994	Ridge Racer 2	Music with Ayako Saso, Nobuyoshi Sano and Takayuki Aihara
1994	Attack of the Zolgear	Music with Ayako Saso
1995	Tekken	PlayStation version; arrangements with various others (Note: Yoshie Arakawa, Yoshie Takayanagi, Nobuyoshi Sano, Hiroto Sasaki, and Takayuki Aihara)
1995	Rave Racer	Music with Ayako Saso, Nobuyoshi Sano and Takayuki Aihara
1995	Dirt Dash	Music with various others (Note: Nobuyoshi Sano, Hiroto Sasaki, Yuri Misumi, Ayako Saso, Takayuki Aihara)
1995	Speed Racer	Music
1996	Xevious 3D/G	Music with Ayako Saso, Nobuyoshi Sano and Hiroto Sasaki
1996	Tekken 2	PlayStation version; arrangements with various others (Note: Yoshie Arakawa, Nobuyoshi Sano, Hiroto Sasaki, Ayako Saso, Takayuki Aihara, and Keiichi Okabe)
1996	Street Fighter EX	Music with Ayako Saso and Takayuki Aihara
1997	Bushido Blade	Music with Ayako Saso and Takayuki Aihara
1997	Street Fighter EX Plus α	Music with Ayako Saso and Takayuki Aihara
1998	Street Fighter EX2	Music with Ayako Saso and Takayuki Aihara
1998	Tetris: The Grand Master	Music with Ayako Saso
1999	iS: internal section	Music with Ayako Saso
1999	Street Fighter EX2 Plus	Music with Ayako Saso and Takayuki Aihara
1999	Custom Robo	Music with Ayako Saso and Yasuhisa Watanabe
2000	Street Fighter EX3	Music with Ayako Saso, Takayuki Aihara and Yasuhisa Watanabe
2000	Driving Emotion Type-S	Music with Ayako Saso and Takayuki Aihara
2000	Tetris: The Absolute – The Grand Master 2	Music with Ayako Saso
2000	Custom Robo V2	Music with Ayako Saso, Yasuhisa Watanabe and Yousuke Yasui
2002	Technic Beat	Music with SuperSweep
2002	Custom Robo GX	Music with Ayako Saso
2003	Mega Man Network Transmission	Music with Ayako Saso and Yousuke Yasui
2004	Xenosaga Episode II: Jenseits von Gut und Böse	Music with Yuki Kajiura and Ayako Saso
2005	Tetris: The Grand Master 3 – Terror‑Instinct	Music with Ayako Saso
2005	Spikeout: Battle Street	Music with Ayako Saso
2005	Azumi	Music with Ayako Saso, Yousuke Yasui and Masashi Yano
2005	Ibara	Music
2005	Under Defeat	Music
2005	Super Dragon Ball Z	Music with SuperSweep
2009	Nine Hours, Nine Persons, Nine Doors	Music
2010	Fate/Extra	Music with Keita Haga and Daisuke Nagata
2012	Zero Escape: Virtue's Last Reward	Music
2016	Zero Time Dilemma	Music
2021	Pac-Man 99	Music with Ayako Saso
2022	Alice Gear Aegis: Op. Halzion	Music
2025	Tetris: The Grand Master 4 – Absolute Eye	Music with Ayako Saso
2025	Hunter × Hunter: Nen × Impact	Music with Ayako Saso, Takahiro Eguchi, and Masashi Yano

==== As a contributor ====
Year	Title	Notes
1988	Metal Hawk	Music with Kazuo Noguchi
1995	Mach Breakers	Music ("Attract")
1998	Battle Garegga	Saturn version; arrangements ("Subversive Awareness" and "Erupter")
2000	Victorious Boxers: Ippo's Road to Glory	Music with Takayuki Aihara and Naoki Tsuchiya
2001	Keyboardmania 3rdMix	Arrangements ("EE-AL-K" and "Sensation from Salamander2")
2001	Beatmania IIDX 5th Style	Music ("Outer Wall" and "Tablets")
2001	Beatmania IIDX 6th Style	Music ("Route 80s" and "Rottel-Da-Sun")
2003	DoDonPachi DaiOuJou	PlayStation 2 version; arrangements ("Stage Clear" and "Game Over")
2003	Naruto: Clash of Ninja	Music with Ayako Saso and Yousuke Yasui
2003	Beatmania IIDX 9th Style	Music ("Rottel-the-Mercury")
2003	Naruto: Clash of Ninja 2	Music with Ayako Saso, Yousuke Yasui and Masashi Yano
2004	Beatmania IIDX 10th Style	Music ("1st Samurai")
2004	Espgaluda	PlayStation 2 version; arrangement ("Name Entry")
2004	The King of Fighters 2003	Console versions; arrangements with various others (Note: Yasuo Yamate, Takayuki Aihara, Hiroto Saitoh, Ayako Saso, Yasuhisa Watanabe, and Masashi Yano)
2004	Ridge Racers	Music with various others (Note: Hiroshi Okubo, Keiki Kobayashi, Ayako Saso, Yuu Miyake, Nobuyoshi Sano, Kohta Takahashi, Asuka Sakai, Takayuki Aihara, Tetsukazu Nakanishi, Koji Nakagawa, and Junichi Nakatsuru)
2005	Zatch Bell! Mamodo Battles	Music with SuperSweep
2005	Ridge Racer 6	Music ("Valley of the Mind" and "Highway Fusion")
2006	Monster Kingdom: Jewel Summoner	Music with various others (Note: Hitoshi Sakimoto, Yasunori Mitsuda, Kenji Ito, Yoko Shimomura, Ayako Saso, Yasuyuki Suzuki, Kyouji Iwata, Tsukasa Masuko, and Takahiro Ogata)
2006	Ridge Racers 2	Music ("Rotten7 Remix" and "Heat Floor Remix")
2006	Ridge Racer 7	Music ("Combustion" and "Listen Up!")
2007	Folklore	Music with various others (Note: Kenji Kawai, Ayako Saso, Hiroto Saitoh, and Yuriko Mukoujima)
2007	Endless Ocean	Music with Ayako Saso
2007	Naruto: Clash of Ninja Revolution	Music with SuperSweep
2007	Project Sylpheed	DLC; one track
2007	Arkanoid DS	Arrangement ("Captain Neo -Confusion Mix-")
2007	Umisho	Music ("Glad Romantic")
2008	DJMax Technika	Music ("Son of Sun")
2008	Tekken 6: Bloodline Rebellion	Music ("Fist Festival" (Note: Also used in the console version of Tekken 6))
2008	Let's Tap	Music with various others (Note: Naofumi Hataya, Hiroyuki Yamamoto, Teruyoshi Kutsuna, Ayako Saso, Masaharu Iwata, Mitsuhiro Kaneda, Noriyuki Kamikura, and Azusa Chiba)
2008	Beatmania IIDX 15: DJ Troopers CS	Music ("Vox Up" (Note: with Ryutaro Nakahara))
2009	11eyes CrossOver	Music ("The Long Afternoon of the Mages" and "Hollow Boundary")
2009	3D Dot Game Heroes	Music with SuperSweep
2010	DJMax Technika 2	Music with various others
2010	DJMax Portable 3	Music ("Xlasher")
2011	Otomedius Excellent	DLC-only; music with various others
2011	Ridge Racer 3D	Music with various others (Note: Hiroshi Okubo, Taku Inoue, Rio Hamamoto, Ryo Watanabe, Ayako Saso, Keiichi Okabe, and Akihiko Ishikawa)
2011	Ridge Racer (2011)	Music ("The Time is Now")
2012	Ridge Racer Unbounded	Music ("Mushrooms" and "Wrong Way")
2012	Tekken Tag Tournament 2	Console version; music with various others (Note: Akitaka Tohyama, Nobuyoshi Sano, Ayako Saso, Keiichi Okabe, Keigo Hoashi, Taku Inoue, Yoshihito Yano, Yuu Miyake, Rio Hamamoto, Go Shiina, and Ryo Watanabe)
2012	Groove Coaster Zero	Music ("Wacky Dance Ethnic")
2013	Tekken Revolution	Music ("Fear to Agonize")
2013	maimai PLUS	Arrangement ("Like the Wind [Reborn]")
2014	Onigiri	Music ("The Rainbow Wind Blows" and "One and All, Forever")
2014	Raiden IV: OverKill	Arrangement ("Lightning Strikes")
2015	Chunithm	Music ("The Wheel to the Right")
2016	The Metronomicon: Slay the Dance Floor	Music ("Zombie Chase")
2017	Giga Wrecker	Music with Takahiro Eguchi and Teruo Taniguchi
2017	DJMax Respect	Music ("Mulch")
2017	Fighting EX Layer	Music with SuperSweep
2018	Pokémon Quest	Music with Teruo Taniguchi, Takahiro Eguchi, and Fumihisa Tanaka
2019	Tetris 99	Music with various others
2024	Tekken 8	Music ("Delusional Reality" and "Dive into the Arcade")
2024	Endless Ocean Luminous	Music with Ayako Saso and Takahiro Eguchi
2024	Changeable Guardian Estique	Music ("Planetary Throne")
2025	Pokémon Legends: Z-A	Music with various others

=== Anime ===
Year	Title	Notes
2012	The Pet Girl of Sakurasou	Music with various others
2014	Sgt. Frog	Music with Ayako Saso, Takahiro Eguchi and Yousuke Yasui
2014	No Game No Life	Music with Ayako Saso, Takahiro Eguchi and Fumihasa Tanaka
2015	Taboo Tattoo	Music with Ayako Saso and Takahiro Eguchi
