= Assault (1988 video game) =

1988 video game

- Japanese arcade flyer
- Developer: Namco
- Publishers: JP: Namco; NA: Atari Games
- Artist: Kunio Ogawara
- Composer: Shinji Hosoe
- Platform: Arcade
- Release: JP: April 1988; NA: August 1988
- Genre: Multidirectional shooter
- Modes: Single-player, multiplayer
- Arcade system: Namco System 2

Assault (Note: Japanese: アサルト, Hepburn: Asaruto) is a 1988 multidirectional shooter video game developed and published by Namco for arcades. It was released by Atari Games in North America. Controlling a caterpillar-tread self-propelled gun, the player is tasked with completing each of the game's eleven stages while shooting enemies and avoiding projectiles. It uses a twin-stick control layout, similar to games such as Battlezone. The plot involves the human race searching for new planets after Earth reaches its maximum population - after discovering an exo-planet 35,000 light years away from the Milky Way, they enslave the planet's natives and take control, leading to the planet's native population vowing to abolish the humans and bring peace to their world. The protagonist who rides the aforementioned self-propelled gun which players control, is one such native.

Assault was one of the first games to use the Namco System 2 arcade hardware, capable of sprite scaling and rotation. Music was composed by Shinji Hosoe while designs for the player's tank and enemies were designed by Gundam artist Kunio Ogawara. Upon release, Assault was met with favorable reviews, with critics applauding the game's graphics, controls and usage of sprite-scaling.

A Japan-only updated version, Assault Plus, was released the same year.

== Gameplay ==
Arcade version screenshot

Controlling a caterpillar-tread self-propelled gun, the player is tasked with completing each of the game's eleven stages by destroying enemies and avoiding enemy projectiles. Some projectiles can be negated with shots fired from the self-propelled gun, other shots cannot and thus must be avoided.

Similar to Battlezone (1980), the game features a twin-stick control scheme, where pushing the joysticks forward will cause the tank to move forward and pushing them backwards will make it reverse direction. Turning is done by moving only one joystick forward. Pushing both joysticks left or right will flip the tank over, which can allow the player to move through narrow spots. Pushing both joysticks away from each other will allow the player to do a Power Wheelie, which will allow it to fire powerful grenades at enemies. The player can also perform Rapid Rolls (strafing) by pushing both joysticks either left or right.

Levels include one or more "lift zones" that push the tank high into the air when driven onto. When in the air, the player sees a zoomed-out view of the battlefield and can launch long-range attacks against the enemies while remaining completely safe from their shots. Lift zones can only be used a limited number of times.

The game is composed of eleven stages, which include large deserts, mechanical bases, forests and rivers. The end of each stage features a large mechanical structure that must be defeated, which will shoot projectiles at the player. Stages also contain large "Jump Pads" that will catapult the tank into the sky when touched, allowing the player to shoot powerful blasts towards enemies on the ground and to view other sections of the map. A flashing arrow will appear on-screen to point the player towards the level exit.

== Plot ==
In the year 2199, Earth reached its maximum population point, causing humans to venture throughout the Milky Way in search of potential new planets to inhabit. One such pioneer space ship called Pilot 1, consisted of 3000 personnel with 2000 soldiers and 1000 scientists and technicians. 35,000 light years away from the galaxy, Pilot 1 had discovered a planet habitable to humans (though the way new planet's environment is structured in such a bizarre manner that cannot be explained with Earth's science) with large floating continents, inhabited by a native civilization. A large war ensued, and natives were subdued by Earth's colonizers.

After the war is over with humans' victory, humans launched an extensive assessment and discovered that although natives' civilization was more advanced, they had very little concept and experience in waging conflicts, thus lacked a powerful military necessary to fend off invaders and to protect their planet that gave humankind (whose history is riddled with conflicts, arms race and treachery) immense advantage and lead to the downfall of the natives. Fearing that natives, having now experienced a great conflict against foreigners and as advanced as they are would one day rise up to launch a decisive counterattack as well as to secure the further arrival of more human migrants from Earth to settle on this new planet, humans proceeded to militarize the planet by began constructing large fortresses and weaponizing buildings to strengthen their positions. As humans predicted among natives a lone tankman, feeling the humans have no right to reign over by force, pilots a caterpillar-treaded self-propelled gun in an effort to vanquish occupiers from Earth and bring peace to his home planet.

A one-man's war against an army of thousands of human invaders, a war which neither side can afford to back down had begun.

== Development and release ==
Assault was one of the first games to use the Namco System 2 arcade board, which was capable of sprite rotation and scaling. The soundtrack was composed by Shinji Hosoe, while designs for the player's tank and enemies were designed by Gundam artist Kunio Okawara. Assault was originally released in Japan by Namco in April 1988, and in North America by Atari Games in August.

== Reception ==
Reception

Review scores
Publication	Score
Commodore User	8/10
Power Play	83/100

Award
Publication	Award
Gamest	Best Shooting Award 8th Best Ending Award 8th Annual Hit Game 11th

In Japan, Game Machine listed Assault as the second most successful table arcade unit of May 1988. The game was met with a favorable reception from critics, who praised the game's graphics, controls and sprite-scaling techniques. Japanese video game magazine Gamest awarded the title the eighth "Best Shooting Award" and "Best Ending Award", as well as the eleventh "Annual Hit Game" award in January 1998.

Nick Kelly of Commodore User was impressed with the game's technological capabilities, notably the use of sprite scaling and rotation, saying that it features "impressive multi-directional scrolling". He also praised the twin-stick control layout for providing a more 'hands-on' approach to the game, favorably comparing it to Atari's Vindicators. Kelly concluded his review by writing that the game was "a good idea well executed". Power Play gave a similar response, calling its scrolling techniques "unique" and its music a "true celebration". They also applauded the game's attention to detail, particularly with the player's tank slowing down upon moving over rough surfaces.

== Legacy ==
According to former Wolf Team designer Kazuyoshi Inoue, Assault was an influence for Granada alongside Grobda, as co-designer Toshio Toyota was a fan of arcade games. Assault is one of the five titles in Namco Museum Vol. 4 for the PlayStation in 1997. In his review of the collection, Jeff Gerstmann of GameSpot called Assault "the gem of the package". Crispon Boyer of Electronic Gaming Monthly stated that both it and Ordyne were the only games in the collection "worth a darn", calling Assault one of his favorite arcade games. Dan Hsu wrote that the game was only worth playing with an analog controller to get the full arcade experience, while Shawn called it one of the best games in the compilation.

The game was released on the Wii's Virtual Console in Japan on June 9, 2009. Hamster Corporation released the game as part of their Arcade Archives series for the Nintendo Switch and PlayStation 4 in September 2022.

Shortly after Assault was released, a Japan-only follow-up, Assault Plus, was published. It has altered visuals and enemy designs, as well as presenting the stages in an episodic format rather than a linear run. Plus is included in Namco Museum Vol. 4 as a bonus game that can be unlocked with a cheat code.
