= Starblade: Operation Blue Planet =

Unreleased arcade video game

- Teaser flyer
- Developer: Namco
- Director: Higashiyama Asahi
- Designers: Yusuke Watanabe; Satoshi Shida
- Platform: Arcade
- Release: Cancelled
- Genre: Rail shooter
- Mode: Single-player
- Arcade system: Namco System 246

Starblade: Operation Blue Planet (Note: Japanese: スターブレード オペレーションブループラネット, Hepburn: Sutāburēdo Operēshon Burū Puranetto) is an unreleased 3D rail shooter arcade game in development by Namco. A sequel to the game Starblade (1991), the player controls the GeoCalibur starship in its mission to wipe out an alien race known as the Unknown Intelligent Mechanized Species. Gameplay involved using a flight-yoke controller to control a crosshair and shoot down enemies, while avoiding incoming obstacles and projectiles. The player has a shield that depletes when inflicted with enemy fire. Only one level was completed. It ran on the PlayStation 2-based Namco System 246 arcade hardware.

The game was created to utilize an arcade cabinet known as the Over Reality Booster System (O.R.B.S.), which featured a globular mirror and retractable seat. Development of the game was made to be simple and easy to understand, a response to the diminishing Japanese arcade game industry at the time, and to show off the technological capabilities of the O.R.B.S. machine. It was revealed to the public at the 2001 Amusement Machine Show in Japan and became one of the show's most popular titles, having a 70-minute wait time to play it. Critics applauded the game's detailed graphics and immersive experience. It was quietly cancelled following its unveiling, said to have been the result of a sharp decline of arcades and high manufacturing costs of the O.R.B.S. cabinet.

== Gameplay ==
In-game screenshot.

Starblade: Operation Blue Planet is a 3D rail shooter video game, and a sequel to the arcade game Starblade. Controlling the GeoCalibur starship, a successor to the GeoSword from the original, the player is tasked with wiping out an alien race known as the Unknown Intelligent Mechanized Species (UIMS) and their mechanical fortress named Megamouth before they destroy the United Galaxy Space Force, an intergalactic organization ran by humans to protect Earth. The player uses a flight-yoke controller to move a crosshair around the screen, which is used to shoot down enemies and their projectiles. The GeoCalibur has a shield at the top left of the screen that depletes when it is inflicted with damage from enemies, and should it fully deplete the game ends. An unseen announcer alerts the player of incoming enemies or obstacles. Only one level was completed, displaying a "TO BE CONTINUED" message upon completion.

== History ==
=== Development ===
Starblade: Operation Blue Planet was directed by Higashiyama Asahi, and was created for a new arcade cabinet in production by Namco called the "Over Reality Booster System" (O.R.B.S.), a motion-based machine featured a retractable seat, air blowers, a 5.1 channel Dolby Digital audio system, and a large, globular projector screen. The cabinet was originally designed in 1999, and was made to create a more immersive experience in arcade games. Early versions of O.R.B.S. had a rotating screen that moved based on actions performed in the game, in a manner similar to Sega's R-360 motion-based cabinet from several years prior. While the production team brainstormed ideas for which game to make first for the cabinet, designer Higashiyama Asahi suggested a sequel to Starblade, as he was a fan of the original and thought its first-person gameplay would work well — the team thought the idea would be interesting, and began work on a new Starblade game for the O.R.B.S. cabinet. Due to the shrinking arcade industry in Japan, gameplay was made to be simplistic and easy to understand for new players.

The game ran on the Namco System 246 arcade board, designed after the internal hardware of the PlayStation 2. Development was assisted by "Sadahiro", a designer for Galaxian3: Project Dragoon and its sequel Attack of the Zolgear, alongside Yusuke Watanabe and Satoshi Shida. Asahi recalls development being "jerky" due to lack of staff and a small budget to make the game. The team focused on making the game exciting and thrilling, and to show off the technical capabilities of the O.R.B.S. arcade cabinet and System 246 hardware. The game's flat-textured look was based on an assumption by planner "Kobayashi", who thought that the development team behind Starblade would keep the original's graphical style as a sort of "ancestor respect".

=== Promotion and cancellation ===
Starblade: Operation Blue Planet was revealed on September 20, 2001 at the 39th Amusement Machine Show (AMS) arcade game expo in the Tokyo Big Sight convention center in Tokyo, Japan. A prototype O.R.B.S. cabinet was presented, as was a playable one-level demo of the game. It was shown off alongside several of Namco's other arcade games, including the racing game Wangan Midnight: Maximum Tune and the tennis game Smash Court Pro Tournament. Namco promoted the game as being "beyond real" for its immersive gameplay experience and detailed graphics. The company also stated that they would consider bringing the game overseas if demand was high.

It became one of the most popular titles presented at the expo, posing a 70-minute wait time to play it. Only 200 people were able to play the game, which GAME Watch cites as being due to technical difficulties with the hardware. GameSpot wrote that despite Namco's "poor" presence there, the game was one of the "biggest surprises" shown for its realistic graphics and sound effect, saying the game "couldn't have returned at a better time". GAME Watch liked the game's "beautiful" graphics and ambitious arcade cabinet, particularly for its large globular dome-like screen. Rez creator Tetsuya Mizuguchi expressed interest in his game being compatible with the O.R.B.S. cabinet. Shortly after the expo's conclusion, Namco quietly cancelled both Operation Blue Planet and the O.R.B.S. machine, a fact attributed to the latter's high cost and sharp decline in Japanese arcades. Retrospectively, Kotaku expressed disappointment towards the game's sudden cancellation, saying that the game "could have been just the kind of thing the dying arcade scene was in need of". Retro Gamer magazine also showed disappointment towards its cancellation.

== Legacy ==
The concept for O.R.B.S. was later re-used by Namco Bandai Games for their "Panoramic Optical Display" (P.O.D.) arcade cabinet, made to support their Gundam arcade games in Japan. A video showing the entirety of the demo was uploaded to YouTube by Namco Bandai on October 5, 2011. In a 2015 interview with Kazushi Imoto, the lead producer for Star Wars Battle Pod, he noted that Operation Blue Planet and other similar cancelled projects could potentially see a revival if there is enough fan demand.
