= Face Off (video game) =

1988 video game

- Arcade flyer
- Developer: Namco
- Publisher: Namco
- Platform: Arcade
- Release: JP: December 1988
- Genre: Sports
- Modes: Single-player, multiplayer
- Arcade system: Namco System 1

Face Off (Note: Japanese: フェイスオフ, Hepburn: Feisu Ofu) is a 1988 ice hockey video game developed and published by Namco for arcades. It was released only in Japan in December 1988 Up to four players control players from one of eight hockey teams against each other, the objective being to score the most points before the timer ends. Similar to Namco's own Final Lap, multiple cabinets can be linked together to enable multiplayer play. It runs on the Namco System 1 arcade board. Face Off received a favorable critical reception for its visuals and gameplay. The game was re-released on the Wii's Virtual Console in 2009.

== Gameplay ==
Arcade screenshot

Face Off is an ice-hockey arcade game. Players select one of eight hockey teams (Canada, the Czech Republic, Finland, France, Japan, the Soviet Union, Sweden, United States) in two gameplay modes. Tournament Mode has one to two players face four CPU-controlled teams. Versus Mode enables up to four players competing against each other. Players can select how many players their team has.

== Release ==
Face Off was released in Japan in December 1988. It runs on the Namco System 1 arcade system. Much like Namco's own Final Lap series, Face Off allows cabinets to be linked for four-player multiplayer.

== Reception ==
In Japan, Game Machine listed Face Off on their February 1, 1989 issue as being the eighteenth most-successful table arcade unit of the month. The July 1991 issue of Gamest magazine was highly positive of the game, calling its character designs "cute" and labeling it one of Namco's more impressive titles in their late 1980s game output.
