= KORG DS-10 =

2008 music video game

- North American box art
- Developer: Cavia
- Publishers: AQ Interactive (JP, EU); Xseed Games (NA); Nintendo Australia (AUS)
- Designers: Nobuyoshi Sano; Yasunori Mitsuda
- Platform: Nintendo DS
- Release: JP: July 24, 2008; EU: October 10, 2008; NA: November 4, 2008; AU: November 13, 2008
- Genres: Non-game; Music
- Mode: Single-player

KORG DS-10 is a music creation program for the Nintendo DS that emulates the Korg MS range of synthesizers. Frequently people refer to the Korg MS-10, however the MS-10 is a single oscillator monosynth. The DS-10 adds sync which the Korg MS-20 is lacking. It was released on July 24, 2008, in Japan, October 10, 2008, in Europe, and November 4, 2008, in the United States.

A newer, DSi compatible version, entitled KORG DS-10 Plus, was released in Japan on September 17, 2009, and in the United States on February 16, 2010. It doubles the number of synth and drum machines when played on DSi/3DS systems. It also adds some minor new features for the standard DS.

KORG iDS-10 for iPhone combines a virtual analog synthesizer, voice synthesizer, and drum machine, inspired by the design of the KORG DS-10 series.

== Instruments ==
The DS-10 creates sound with two analogue synthesizer emulators, each with two Voltage-Controlled Oscillators (the Korg MS-10 had only one VCO). The VCOs feature a sawtooth, a pulse (with a non-modifiable pulse width), a triangle and a noise waveform. There is also a four-part drum machine that uses the same sound creation techniques as the synthesizers. The sounds made by each of the synthesizer emulators are modified using virtual knobs to change the value of standard synthesizer parameters such as cutoff frequency and waveform shape. Additionally there is a screen where users can patch certain parameters to be modified by a low-frequency oscillation, the envelope generator, or VCO2. Those new to Korg synthesizers may find the original Korg MS-10 Manuals useful in understanding the function of its components.

== Interface ==
The user interface is mainly through the DS's touch screen with the cursors serving as a supplementary method of moving through the various interface screens. The primary method of navigating through interface screens is by switching the interface screen with the processing flow map and selecting which item to modify. Notes can be played using a 2 octave keyboard or through an interface that detects the X and Y position of the stylus on the touch pad simulating a KORG Kaoss Pad. The Kaoss Pad can also be used to modify volume and pan as well as being able to assign the X or Y values to any of the parameters that can be modified elsewhere. Users can record twenty-one sessions with sixteen different step patterns with either live input or through a step sequencer. These patterns can then either be selected live or sequenced with the song mode.

== Effects ==
The DS-10 features a chorus, flanger, and delay parameter that can be applied to each synth or the drum machine individually or as a whole. In addition, each of the editable drum sounds can have a separate effect added to it in addition to the global effect.

== Reception ==
Reception

Aggregate scores
Aggregator	Score
GameRankings	85% (Plus): 80%
Metacritic	82/100 (Plus): 81/100

Review score
Publication	Score
Electronic Gaming Monthly	A−

Reviews of KORG DS-10 have been generally positive, with 82/100 on Metacritic and 85% on GameRankings. IGN gave the tool the lowest score (7.1/10), saying that "it isn't standalone, full-featured music software". However, other reviewers gave this tool very positive scores, citing that this software has great music-making potential.

Devoted fans have set up dedicated communities centered on KORG DS-10.

== Legacy ==
A follow-up title, Korg M01D, was released for Nintendo 3DS via the Nintendo eShop in Japan in July 2013 and November 7, 2013, in North America and Europe. The title features all the sounds from the Korg M1 and some of the sounds from the Korg 01/W. In 2014, the KORG DSN-12 was released for the 3DS, focusing on "the user creating their own unique synth sounds from scratch". It features a "3D oscilloscope screen" which lets the user visualize their sounds.
