= Final Lap 3 =

1992 video game

- Arcade flyer
- Developer: Namco
- Publisher: Namco
- Composer: Masahiro Fukuzawa
- Platform: Arcade
- Release: JP: September 1992; WW: 1992
- Genre: Racing
- Mode: Up to 8 players simultaneously
- Arcade system: Namco System 2

Final Lap 3 (ファイナルラップ3, Fainaru Rappu Tsurī) is the third title in the Final Lap series, released worldwide by Namco in 1992. Like its precursors (as well as Four Trax, and Suzuka 8 Hours), it runs on Namco System 2 hardware, and allows up to eight players to play simultaneously when four two-player cabinets are linked together.

It features four new tracks set in England, France, San Marino, and Spain - and for the third time, the players must take control of either the Williams, McLaren, Ferrari or Tyrrell cars (which have again been redesigned; Ferrari and Tyrrell replaces March and Lotus from the previous games), in a Formula One race on one of the four tracks.

In the single-player mode, the player's score is again based on how far his car travels until the timer runs out or he completes four laps of the chosen circuit, and hitting another car or a billboard will again not cause a player car to explode, like it did in the two Pole Position games, but it can still send it (or the other car) spinning off the track, costing valuable time; in the multiplayer mode, up to eight players can again race simultaneously, which shall again allow for better lap times, as the plain green CPU-controlled cars (which have again also been redesigned) will appear less frequently.

Barcelona is the easiest one of the game's four circuits and is recommended for novice players - once a player has mastered it he is ready to move on to Imola, followed by Paul Ricard (which had been replaced in 1991 by Magny-Cours during the 1991 F1 season). Silverstone (in its 1987-90 configuration, without its overhaul that was done in 1991) is the most difficult out of the four circuits and is therefore only recommended for expert players and those who had managed to master Suzuka in the two previous titles.

== Reception ==
In Japan, Game Machine listed Final Lap 3 on their October 1, 1992 issue as being the third most-successful upright/cockpit arcade game of the month.
