= Wonder Eggs =

Amusement park in Tokyo, Japan

- Location: Futakotamagawa Time Spark, Setagaya, Tokyo
- Status: Defunct
- Opened: 29 February 1992
- Closed: 31 December 2000
- Owner: Namco
- Website: www.namco.co.jp/tp/we2

Wonder Eggs (Note: Japanese: ワンダーエッグ, Hepburn: Wandā Eggu) was an amusement park located in the Niko Tamagawa Park in Tokyo, Japan. The park was constructed by Namco on February 29, 1992, and is the first amusement park operated by a video game company. The park was renovated in 1996 as Wonder Eggs 2 and later in 1999 as Wonder Eggs 3. The park was closed permanently on December 31, 2000 and demolished a year later. The park featured a large carousal, several dark rides, and game centers with a comical theme, as well as a special version of the arcade game Galaxian 3 that seated 28 players.

The Wonder Eggs was built off of leased land and intended to last for five years, however, the park's popularity allowed Namco to continue operating it for many more years. Namco created the park out of its interest in designing a Disneyland-inspired theme park that featured the same kind of stories and characters present in its games. Wonder Eggs saw regularly high attendance numbers; 500,000 visitors attended in its first few months of operation and over one million by the end of the year. By the park's closing, it had amassed six million visitors. Wonder Eggs contributed to Namco's 34% increase in revenue by December 1992.
