= Fighter & Attacker =

1992 video game

- Developer: Namco
- Publisher: Namco
- Composers: Shinji Hosoe; Takayuki Aihara
- Platform: Arcade
- Release: WW: October 1992
- Genre: Vertical-scrolling shooter
- Modes: Single-player, multiplayer

Fighter & Attacker, released in Japan as F/A (Note: Japanese: エフ/エイ, Hepburn: Efu/Ei), is a 1992 vertical-scrolling shooter video game developed and published by Namco. It was released in Japan and North America in October 1992. Hamster Corporation released the game as part of their Arcade Archives series for the Nintendo Switch and PlayStation 4 only in Japan in May 2024.

== Gameplay ==
In-game screenshot

In Fighter & Attacker, players control one of sixteen different aircraft as they must complete each of the game's eight areas. Each aircraft are based on real-world fighter jets, including the F/A-18E, F-15J, F-117A, and F-14D. They also have their own unique weapon loadout and playstyles; some are slower but fire more destructive shots, while other are much faster but fire weaker shots. There are no power-ups or screen-clearing bombs. Players also have a health meter that can sustain three hits before being destroyed. Similar to the Xevious series, the player can launch powerful bombs towards ground targets to destroy them. Some enemies will leave behind captured prisoners when destroyed, which can be picked up for additional points. A boss must be defeated at the end of each level, which increase in difficulty and have more sporadic movement patterns as the player progresses.

== Development ==
Known as F/A in Japan, Fighter & Attacker was programmed for the Namco NA-1 arcade board, which supported titles such as Tinkle Pit and Cosmo Gang the Puzzle. The game is notable for its soundtrack, which was composed jointly by Shinji Hosoe and Takayuki Aihara. During production, Namco executives requested that the music be diverse and not sound similar to that in other games of its kind from the time. Hosoe went with a mixture of techno and rave, which for the genre was unheard of during its release. Namco demonstrated Fighter & Attacker at the 1992 Amusement Machine Show exposition in Japan, shown alongside Final Lap 3 and Bubble Trouble: Golly! Ghost 2. It was published in both Japan and North America in October of that year.

== Reception ==
The arcade magazine Game Machine claims that Fighter & Attacker was the seventh most-popular arcade game of November 1992 in Japan.

Retro Gamer compared its gameplay to Namco's own Xevious for its usage of air-to-air and air-to-surface weapons, and believed fans of the 1942 and Aero Fighters series would likely be invested in it. The magazine felt overall that Fighter & Attacker was a decent scrolling shooter, but its "bland" graphical style and setting caused it to be overshadowed by other similar games, and was unsurprised at the lack of a home conversion. Hardcore Gaming 101 writer Neil Foster agreed, believing the game's main fault lied in its lack of a hook: "The no-frills militant visuals lacks a fantastical and inviting thrill, leaving this fighter stuck on the runway." Foster believed the game was graphically behind from other shooters, with uninteresting and generic level environments, and that its difficulty was too high. Though he enjoyed its techno-infused soundtrack, Foster stated that Fighter & Attacker was missing the same level of polish that other military-themed shooters had, such as Aero Fighters.
