= Changeable Guardian Estique =

2024 video game

- Developer: Cat Hui Trading (Note: Ported to Microsoft Windows, Nintendo Switch, PlayStation 5, and Xbox Series X/S by AMATA Games.)
- Publisher: Broke Studio (Note: Microsoft Windows, Nintendo Switch, PlayStation 5, and Xbox Series X/S ports will be published by AMATA Games.)
- Director: Takayuki Komabayashi
- Producer: Takayuki Komabayashi
- Designers: Kenji Takayama; Takayuki Komabayashi
- Programmers: Satoshi Fujishima; Takayuki Hirono
- Artists: Hiroki Kodama; Kenji Takayama
- Writer: Hiroki Kodama
- Composers: Ayako Saso; Sakuoki Kudo; Shinichi Sakamoto; Shinji Hosoe
- Platforms: Nintendo Entertainment System/Family Computer, Microsoft Windows, Nintendo Switch, PlayStation 5, Xbox Series X/S
- Release: NES/Famicom: WW: December 16, 2024; Microsoft Windows, Nintendo Switch, PS5, Xbox Series X/S: WW: August 6, 2026
- Genre: Horizontal-scrolling shooter
- Mode: Single-player

Changeable Guardian Estique (Note: Known in Japan as Chouyoku Senki Estique (Japanese: 超翼戦騎エスティーク(ちょうよくせんきエスティーク), Hepburn: Chōyoku Senki Esutīku; lit. 'Super Winged Battle Knight Estique').) is a 2024 horizontal-scrolling shooter video game developed by Cat Hui Trading and published by Broke Studio for the Nintendo Entertainment System/Family Computer. The plot follows Estique, a transformable mecha piloted by Mary and Kanon from the planet Petelgeuse, sent to help Earth against the invading Van-De-Raus space pirates. The player can switch between a spaceship and a robot.

Changeable Guardian Estique was directed by Takayuki Komabayashi, who previously worked at M2 as part of the Sega Genesis Mini and Game Gear Micro teams, before going independent and establishing Cat Hui Trading. Former Compile staffers participated in the game's production, while the soundtrack was composed by Ayako Saso, Sakuoki Kudo, Shinichi Sakamoto, and Shinji Hosoe.

Changeable Guardian Estique received generally favorable reviews from critics, with praise for its graphics, music, gameplay, and near absence of sprite flickering. However, criticism focused on regional differences between the Japanese and English versions, misleading difficulty names, and limited weapon types.

== Gameplay ==
The Estique mecha in fighter mode battling against enemies in the fourth stage set in New York City

Changeable Guardian Estique is a horizontal-scrolling shooter game. The story takes place in 2413, when the Van-De-Raus space pirates invaded Earth, occupying five financial centers and seizing control of the global economy. A friendly planet, Petelgeuse, decided to help Earth against the space pirates by sending the Estique, a transformable mecha piloted by Mary and Kanon.

The player can switch the Estique between two modes: a horizontal spaceship fighter and a vertical robot. Fighter mode enhances its weapons with more powerful attacks. Robot mode has a larger hitbox, but can unleash a barrier that clears the path through bullets and is immune to environmental damage. Each mode determines Estique's health regeneration rate, with robot mode being faster than fighter mode. Health also regenerates if Estique does not take damage for a period of time.

The player can collect an item that alternates between Wave (W) and B.I.T. (B). Wave produces a wide, three-directional shot, while B.I.T. forms two orbital barriers that fire at enemies and block enemy shots. Collecting an item replenishes the Estique's special attack reserve by one, or it is used automatically if full. There are six stages in total, each with a boss at the end. The game offers three difficulty levels: Normal, Hard, and God of Game.

== Development ==
Changeable Guardian Estique was developed by Cat Hui Trading, a Japanese video game developer founded by Takayuki Komabayashi in 2021. He previously served as a sales manager at the Akihabara game store Beep Shop, and then joined M2 in 2017, working as part of the Sega Genesis Mini and Game Gear Micro teams, before going independent and establishing his own company. Komabayashi served as the game's director, producer, and planner. Former Compile staffers participated in the production. Takayuki "Jemini" Hirono (of Zanac, The Guardian Legend, Aleste, and Blazing Lazers) was the game's lead programmer. Satoshi "Pac" Fujishima (of Golvellius) assisted Hirono with programming and handled the sound effects. Production designer Hiroki "Daigattai" Kodama (of Power Strike II, and Spriggan Mark 2: Re-Terraform Project) was responsible for the original story concept and various character designs. Artist Kenji "Yamatan" Takayama worked on the stage design and in-game graphics.

The music for Changeable Guardian Estique was scored by Ayako Saso (of Ridge Racer), Sakuoki "sdhizumi" Kudo, Shinichi Sakamoto (of Wonder Boy), and Shinji Hosoe. In 2025, SuperSweep released a CD album in Japan containing the game's original soundtrack, as well as bonus tracks.

== Release ==
Changeable Guardian Estique was first unveiled at Digital Games Expo 2023, a Japanese event dedicated to indie and doujin games, where the demo was sold as a ROM image. The game was showcased at other events such as Wonder Festival 2024 Winter, BitSummit Drift 2024, and the Taiwanese indie event G-Eight 2024. It was also playtested at the Hey game center in Akihabara, and a demo was offered at the Kenchan Electronics store. The game was released for the Nintendo Entertainment System/Family Computer (NES/Famicom) on December 16, 2024, by Broke Studio, a French video game publisher founded by Antoine Gohin in 2017. The English and Japanese versions feature different storylines and graphics for the opening and closing sequences.

In 2025, AMATA Games announced that Changeable Guardian Estique would be ported and released for the Nintendo Switch, PlayStation 5, Xbox Series X/S, and PC via Steam on August 6, 2026. It will feature both the English and Japanese versions, a score attack variant, and a gallery mode. A physical edition for the Nintendo Switch will be released on November 26, 2026.

== Reception ==
Changeable Guardian Estique received generally favorable reviews. Time Extension's John Szczepaniak lauded the game for its refined gameplay, exquisite visuals, near absence of sprite flickering, and great depth when played on the highest difficulty level, but considered the regional differences between the Famicom and NES versions and the misleading difficulty names to be negative aspects. Thomas Nickel of M! Games considered it a technically spectacular 8-bit shooter, highlighting the near absence of sprite flickering during action, as well as the excellent gameplay and level design. Retro Gamer's Andrew Fisher called it a stunning and brilliant game that pushes the NES hardware to its limits, praising its gorgeous graphics and soundtrack. Hardcore Gaming 101's Kurt Kalata stated that the game was a marvel to behold, citing its masterful graphics, as well as the lack of slowdown and minimal flickering, but felt that the different language variations between the English and Japanese versions emulated the worst of the 8-bit era, and that the limited weapon types were its only drawback.
