= Final Lap 2 =

1990 Namco racing video game

- Developer: Namco
- Publisher: Namco
- Composer: Shinji Hosoe
- Platform: Arcade
- Release: JP: August 1990; WW: January 1991
- Genre: Racing (simulation)
- Mode: Up to 8 players simultaneously
- Arcade system: Namco System 2

Final Lap 2 (Note: Japanese: ファイナルラップ2, Hepburn: Fainaru Rappu Tsū) is an racing simulation game released by Namco for arcades in 1990. It is the arcade sequel to Final Lap and runs on Namco System 2 hardware.

== Gameplay ==
Much like the original title (and Four Trax), it allows up to eight players to play simultaneously when four two-player sit-down cabinets are connected together, but this one features four different tracks which are set in the game's home country of Japan (the Suzuka Circuit from the original), Italy, Monaco, and the United States (which resembles the Test track that was featured in Pole Position II). For a second time, the players must take control of either the Williams, McLaren, March or Lotus cars, which have been redesigned, in a Formula One race on one of the four tracks. In the single-player mode, the player's score will be based upon how far his car travels until the timer runs out or he completes four laps of the chosen circuit, and hitting another car or a billboard will again not cause a player car to explode like it did in the two Pole Position games, but it can still send it (or the other car) spinning off the track, costing valuable time. In the multiplayer mode, up to eight players can again race simultaneously; this will again allow for better lap times, as the plain green CPU-controlled cars (which have also been redesigned) will appear less frequently. Indianapolis Motor Speedway is the easiest of the four, and is recommended for novice players. Once a player has mastered it, he is ready to move onto Circuit de Monaco, then Autodromo Nazionale di Monza (which are of medium and medium-hard difficulties). However, Suzuka Circuit is the most difficult one, given that it is the same Suzuka Circuit from the original game and it's therefore only recommended for expert players or players who had managed to master it in the original.

== Reception ==
Reception

Review score
Publication	Score
Famitsu	6/10, 5/10, 6/10, 5/10

In Japan, the arcade magazine Game Machine reported that Final Lap 2 was the top-earning upright/cockpit arcade game of September 1990. It went on to be Japan's highest-grossing dedicated arcade cabinet of 1991, and third highest-grossing overall arcade game of the year (below Street Fighter II and Final Fight). Final Lap 2 was then Japan's second highest-grossing arcade game of 1992, again below Street Fighter II.

In North America, it was the top-grossing new video game on the RePlay arcade charts in May 1991, and was then the top-grossing upright cabinet from June to July 1991. It was awarded the Silver Award at the 1992 American Amusement Machine Association (AAMA) tradeshow for sales excellence in 1991; it was one of five arcade video games at the show to receive a Silver Award or higher. It also topped the RePlay deluxe cabinet chart in March 1992.

Mark Caswell of Crash magazine gave it a positive review, calling it a good racing game.

Reviewing the game in March 1991, the four reviewers in Famitsu found it less appealing than other similar racing games. with somewhat poor graphics and the reviewers having difficulty in reading the speedometer and changing gears.
