= Orgarhythm =

2012 video game

- Japanese box art
- Developers: Acquire; Neilo
- Publisher: Xseed Games
- Platform: PlayStation Vita
- Release: JP: August 9, 2012; NA: October 23, 2012; EU: January 16, 2013
- Genres: Rhythm game, real-time strategy

Orgarhythm is a video game developed by Acquire and Neilo and published by Xseed Games for the PlayStation Vita. It is a hybrid between god simulation, rhythm and strategy.

== Gameplay ==
The player is the God of Light, whom controls three different groups of warriors symbolizing the elements of earth, fire and water. The player commands the God of Light through rhythmic commands; once to start the battle sequence, again to select the elemental type, and again to select the attack. If the player's tapping matches the beat of the background music, the player's warriors grow stronger. If a mistake is made, the player's warriors grow weaker, and failing to issue a command resets the player's level back to level one.

In battle, the player must constantly issue commands, and has no control over the God of Light's movement, which was criticized by IGN and Joystiq. The player fights against enemy troops (the "Dark Tribe") led by the God of Light's brother. The enemy's warriors mirror the player's own, until the player reaches a boss battle. Depending on the element of the troops, the player may be either at an advantage or a disadvantage.

== Reception ==
Joystiq scored the game 3.5 out of 5, saying "the theme is a lot of fun, the gameplay is unique, the music is masterful, and the boss fights can be truly spectacular." Destructoid rated it 8/10, stating "If you're willing to go at it again and again with Orgarhythm, you'll find that it's a pretty rewarding experience, and you'll have a ton of fun in the process." IGN's review was more negative, with a summary of "Orgarhythm stumbles over itself in a slow, cumbersome mess of issues that devastate the potential of its musical strategy" and a rating of 4.7.
