= Galaxian3: Project Dragoon =

1990 rail shooter video game

- North American promotional flyer
- Developer: Namco
- Publisher: Namco: EU: Sony Computer Entertainment (PS)
- Designer: Shigeki Toyama
- Composers: Shinji Hosoe; Ayako Saso
- Series: Galaxian
- Platforms: Arcade, PlayStation
- Release: Arcade: JP: April 1, 1990; WW: 1991; PlayStation: JP: April 26, 1996; PAL: August 1996
- Genre: Rail shooter
- Mode: Multiplayer
- Arcade system: Namco Theater 6

Galaxian3: Project Dragoon (Note: Japanese: ギャラクシアン3 プロジェクトドラグーン, Hepburn: Gyarakushian 3 Purojekuto Doragūn) (Note: Stylized as GALAXIAN³ - PROJECT DRAGOON) is a 3D rail shooter video game developed and published by Namco. It was originally a theme park attraction designed for the International Garden and Greenery Exposition (Expo '90) in Japan, and was later released as an arcade game in 1992. The game involves players controlling a starship named the Dragoon in its mission to destroy Cannon Seed, a superweapon set to destroy what is left of the human race.

An entry in the Galaxian series, Galaxian3 was conceived following Namco's success with motion-based arcade games in the late-1980s, such as Final Lap and Metal Hawk. The attraction version, housed in a massive circular room and supporting 28 players, was designed by company engineer Shigeki Toyama. He was tasked with making the biggest video game possible to prevent other companies from copying it, in addition to creating a game that showed off Namco's 3D technology. The attraction was moved to Namco's Wonder Eggs theme park in 1992, where it remained until its closure in 2000. Namco developed other smaller versions for other theme parks and its own video arcades in Japan and Taiwan. The game saw a home release for the PlayStation in 1996 in Japan and PAL regions titled Galaxian^{3}.

Galaxian3's demonstration at Expo '90 was received favorably, with showgoers showing interest and enthusiasm in the game's 3D flat-shaded graphics and technology. The arcade release was also praised for its technological features and impressiveness, while the PlayStation version saw mixed responses for its outdated gameplay and the appeal of the original having been lost. Galaxian3 has since gained a dedicated following among arcade game collectors for its scarcity, and has also been the focus of video game preservation efforts.

== Gameplay ==
PlayStation version screenshot

Galaxian3: Project Dragoon is a rail shooter video game. It uses Laserdisc-based video footage with 3D polygonal graphics overlaid on top. Each version supports a varied number of players; for instance, the theme park attraction allows for 28, while the PlayStation version only supports four. In the game, players assume control of the Dragoon, a massive space vessel created by the United Galaxy Space Force (UGSF) to destroy a race of hostile aliens known as the Unknown Intellectual Mechanized Species (UIMS). Players do not control the Dragoon directly, as it moves along a pre-set path; instead, they control a colored cursor that can fire lasers at incoming enemies. The objective is to make it towards the end without getting hit. All players share one health bar, labeled as "ENERGY" and positioned at the bottom of the screen. The meter depletes when the Dragoon is hit by enemies, obstacles, or projectiles.

The story is set far into the future, where mankind is studying interstellar travel and exploring the outer regions of the Solar System. When a group of humans settle on the planet Alpha, they detect unusual crustal movements within its surface. In response, the UGSF is sent to investigate, only to discover the planet is being inhabited by the UIMS. The race is using Alpha to construct a powerful superweapon called Cannon Seed, capable of destroying any planet in its radius. To prevent Cannon Seed from destroying what is left of humanity, the UGSF deploys its largest and most-powerful starship, the Dragoon, to destroy the UIMS once and for all.

== Development ==
During the late 1980s, Japanese video game company Namco began to experiment with making arcade games that felt like miniature theme park attractions, such as sit-down machines like Final Lap (1987), and motion-based games such as Metal Hawk (1988) and Winning Run (1989). Namco had also started opening up large amusement centers across Japan, which featured many of these "taikan" arcade games alongside standard video game cabinets. With the motion games being critically and commercially successful, and the amusement centers turning a high profit, the company started drafting plans for a potential Namco-themed amusement park, with attractions based on their games. Galaxian3 was the first of these attractions to be conceived. Namco planners decided on basic foundations for the game, such as how long a single-play would be and the level structure, before presenting and commissioning the game to engineer Shigeki Toyama, known for his work on Xevious and Point Blank.

Galaxian3 was housed in a 360-degree circular room, with a "Motion Unit" in the center. The game was projected on large fiberglass projectors that surround the room.

Toyama's supervisor instructed him and rest of the development team to pour all of their energy into the project, even if it meant other projects had to be postponed — as such, Namco only produced a small number of games in 1990. The goal of the project was to create the "greatest game in the world", and to make an arcade game so massive that other companies couldn't imitate it, an idea believed to stem from Namco's bitter rivalry with Sega. Executives wanted the game finished in time for the 1990 International Garden and Greenery Exposition, also known as Expo '90, in Osaka, giving Toyama and the production staff a tight deadline.

The game was housed in a large, circular room, with massive curved fiberglass projector screens surrounding it. Players were seated in a large cylindrical device placed in the center of the room, powered by hydraulics and moving around as the game progressed. Dubbed the "Motion Unit", it proved difficult to design during the production phase, as Toyama and others had issues with the hydraulics. The hydraulics themselves were purchased from an outside company instead of being made in-house, however due to them being created by a new hire were full of programming errors. Staff wanted the Motion Unit to have the feeling of a rollercoaster, with swift dives and sharp turns. An emergency stop button was implemented in the event that the Motion Unit would keep moving even when the game ended. Numerous other issues were found as well, such as the wires being too short to let the Motion Unit move and the hardware inside being knocked and jostled around. The game could seat a maximum of 28 players due to the curvature of the fiberglass screens and the design of the room itself; Toyama thought this could help increase the game's appeal, as if they made something that massive other companies wouldn't be able to copy it. Due to its sheer scale, Toyama compared designing the machine to designing a building.

The 3D models were done by Toyama and several others, as was the game itself. Unlike Namco's other 3D video games at the time, such as Winning Run, the models in Galaxian3 were of a much higher quality and resolution, however hardware limitations prevented the models from being textured. The soundtrack was composed jointly by Shinji Hosoe and Ayako Saso, being among their first projects for Namco and both of whom also provided minor assistance on the game itself. Saso assisted in the design of the projector boards. The name Galaxian3 was chosen due to the game bearing similarities with Galaxian and Galaga. Staff thought this would help ensure recognition. The "3" in the title is the algebraic term cubed (³), a reference to the game's usage of 3D polygons.

== Release ==
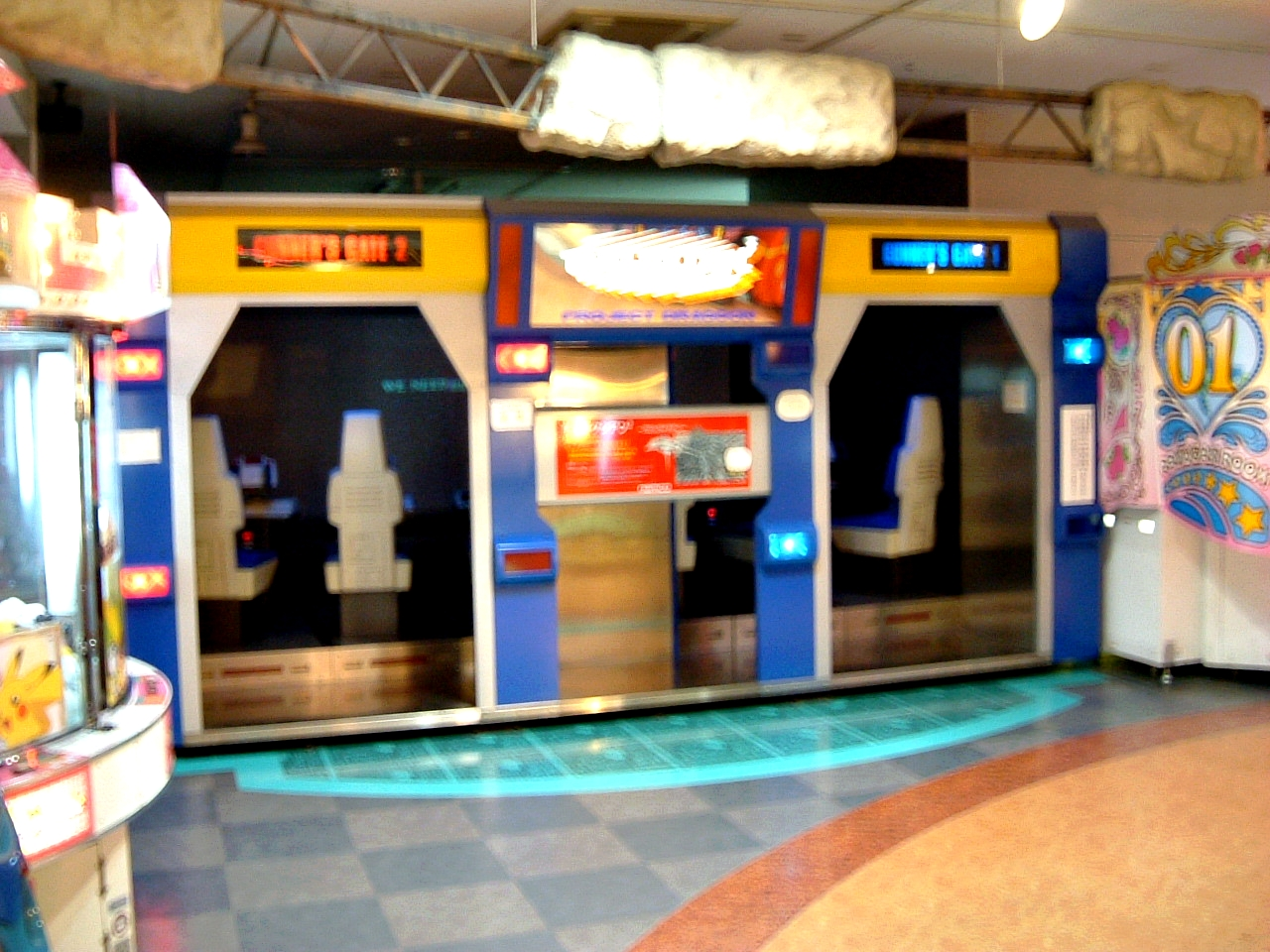
A Theater-6 Galaxian3 cabinet

Galaxian3: Project Dragoon was exhibited at the International Garden and Greenery Exposition in Osaka, also known as Expo '90, on April 1, 1990, and remained in operation until the event's conclusion in September. It was shown off alongside an attraction based on another Namco game, The Tower of Druaga, being the only two video game-related machines presented. The game had minor technical difficulties during its exhibition, although were quickly fixed as the event progressed. Namco chose to show it at Expo '90 as a way to present the game to an international audience, billing it as an "active simulator" and "hyper entertainment machine" in various pieces of promotional material. Show-goers were impressed with the game's technological accomplishments and 3D graphics, seen as being very impressive for the time.

A year later in 1991, Namco produced a smaller, 16-player version of Galaxian3 for various amusement centers worldwide. Dubbed the "GM-16", it was produced in extremely scarce numbers, and was created specifically to target arcades that wouldn't have room for a normal 28-player machine. In early 1992, the original Galaxian3 shown at Expo '90 was moved to the Namco Wonder Eggs theme park, located in the Futakotamagawa Time Spark amusement spot in Setagaya, Tokyo. It remained a popular attraction until the park's closure in 2000, with much of its parts either being sold off or destroyed. A second 28-player Galaxian3 was created in 1993 for a Namco arcade center in Kanagawa Prefecture, being internally named the "GH-28" to distinguish it from the 16-player version. The arcade closed in 1997 and the machine was dismantled and auctioned off, with proceeds going to charities.

Namco designed another smaller variation of Galaxian3 for arcades, further decreasing the player count to six. It was released in December 1992 in Japan and in North America in March 1993. It marked the game's first appearance in English-speaking territories, being test-marketed in England and shown at various amusement expos in the United States. This version utilized a Namco System 21 arcade board with LaserDisc players attached to it, titled the "Theater 6" system. This version of the game was renamed to Galaxian3: Theater-6 to avoid confusion with other models. Theater-6 had higher-resolution graphics compared to the GH-28, as well as using 120-inch projectors and updated projector systems. Like GM-16, the Theater-6 version of the game was produced in very limited numbers; due to the massive size of these cabinets, most arcade operators simply had them destroyed or torn down for spare parts when the game no longer became profitable. As such, only a small handful of Theater-6 machines exist in the world, almost all of which being in the hands of private collectors. The Video Game Museum in Japan houses the only publicly-available Galaxian3 machine in the country.

In June 1994, GameFan magazine teased a port of Galaxian3 for the 3DO Interactive Multiplayer, however such a port was never released. A Virtual Boy conversion was also in development by Locomotive Corporation, which also went unreleased. In 1996, Namco published a home conversion of Galaxian3 for the PlayStation in Japan and Europe, stripping the Project Dragoon subtitle. This version of the game allowed for four-person multiplayer and featured smoothed-out, higher-resolution visuals and a newer soundtrack. It also included a bonus game called The Rising of Gourb, which had a new storyline and levels, as well as support for the NeGcon controller. The PlayStation version was digitally-released for the PlayStation Network on February 12, 2014 under the Game Archives brand.

== Reception ==
Reception

Review scores
Publication	Score
AllGame	3/5
Famitsu	8/10, 6/10, 7/10, 7/10
Dengeki PlayStation	70/100, 65/100, 55/100, 60/100

Galaxian3: Project Dragoon was a monumental success. It was one of the most popular exhibitions at Expo '90 up until its conclusion, and was seen by players as an immersive, alluring piece of technology and entertainment. According to Hajime Nakatani, a designer for the game and the creator of Starblade, Galaxian3 was also a media sensation, regularly appearing as a featured topic in newspapers and television.

Galaxian3 was released for the PlayStation in Japan on April 26, 1996.

Retrospectively in 1998, Allgame was impressed with the game's scenery, presentation and immersive experience, writing that it is "just the ticket" for fans of the genre. They also complimented the PlayStation version for its accurate portrayal of the arcade version, particularly in retaining the "dazzling" 3D graphics. Both Famitsu and Dengeki PlayStation felt that while the game was still fun to play, the lack of playing it in the Theater-6 arcade machine had caused much of its atmosphere and entertainment to be lost during the transition to console. They also were critical of the game's short length and lack of a remade graphics mode similar to Starblade Alpha.

== Legacy ==
Galaxian3: Project Dragoon is considered influential and important for being an early instance of turning video games into amusement rides, and for its usage of 3D polygonal graphics. It has achieved a small but dedicated following in more recent times, with preservation efforts being made to salvage anything related from the game to prevent it from being lost. It also influenced other companies to produce similar machines as a way to cash in on its success, such as Sega's Cyber Dome and Yotto-Group's 6D Cinema.

In 1990, Namco began work on a single-player prototype for Galaxian3 for arcades. This was the basis for Starblade, which was published a year later. With its cinematic atmosphere and technological accomplishments, Starblade was well-received, and became inspiration for titles such as Star Fox and Panzer Dragoon. It has also been ported to several systems such as the PlayStation, 3DO, and mobile phones. Solvalou, a 3D Xevious spin-off from 1991, is also based on Galaxian3. Namco published a sequel to Galaxian3 called Attack of the Zolgear in 1994, where it was offered as a conversion kit for the Theater-6 arcade version. Zolgear has players taking on the monster of the same name, which awakens after a 1,000-year sleep to destroy a nearby space colony and soon the entire human race. It never received a home release.

Beginning around the early 2000s, Galaxian3 has gained a large cult following for its historical importance and for being an important game for Namco, likely driven by its popularity at the Wonder Eggs park. Fan conventions based on it have been set up in Japan, as well as clubs and dōjin goods. It has also spawned collection circles and restoration projects to fix and preserve older Theater 6 machines, with some appearing in video game museums and expositions worldwide.

== See also ==
- List of LaserDisc games
