= Attack of the Zolgear =

1994 video game

- Developer: Namco
- Publisher: Namco
- Composers: Shinji Hosoe; Ayako Saso; Nobuyoshi Sano
- Series: Galaxian
- Platform: Arcade
- Release: JP: July 1994; NA: 1994
- Genre: Rail shooter

Attack of the Zolgear (Note: Japanese: アタック オブ ザ ゾルギア, Hepburn: Atakku Obu Za Zorugia) is an arcade game for one to six players released by Namco. As a sequel to Galaxian 3, This game used two LaserDisc players simultaneously for the outer space background, while computer generated graphics were overlaid on top.

== Synopsis ==
Attack of the Zolgear is set in the time when space exploration has reached its peak. Humanity has since expanded its presence beyond the Milky Way. Around one of the colonies that are part of the current expansion, Exia, there is a moon orbiting around it called Zol. Zol serves as a diplomatic space port of tremendous importance of intergalactic relations, but its gravity is unstable, causing serious problems for spaceships trying to land or take off. Investigations uncovered a gravitational quirk in one of Zol's giant craters, and the search for the source has begun. And the source is found, a horrifying and unspeakable discovery, beneath the crater there is an alien life of unimaginable size—the great threat of humanity—Zolgear. Following its discovery, Zolgear destroys everything on Zol before leaping into space, heading for Exia, with its intent of destroying the colony. Only Dragoon stands in its way and can save the day for Exia: Dragoon J2, more powerful than its precursor, Dragoon, is headed for Exia for the United Galaxy Space Force (UGSF) in a mission to save humanity.

== In other media ==
Zolgear appears in later Namco games: in Bounty Hounds, player can fight an infant Zolgear. In the canceled Japanese real-time strategy game New Space Order, the Zolgear would have been a player-controllable unit (treated as a "planet buster" unit, which can reduce a targeted planet's population to zero) in the "Sacred Religious State" nation.
