= Starblade (1991 game) =

1991 video game

- North American arcade flyer
- Developer: Namco (Note: Sega CD version developed by Technosoft.)
- Publisher: Namco
- Director: Hajime Nakatani
- Composer: Shinji Hosoe
- Platforms: Arcade, Sega CD, 3DO, PlayStation, mobile phone
- Release: September 1991: Arcade; JP/NA: September 1991; EU: 1991 Sega CD; NA: September 1994; JP: October 28, 1994; PAL: December 1994 3DO; NA: December 15, 1994; JP: December 16, 1994 PlayStation; JP: March 31, 1995; EU: February 1996; NA: April 27, 1996
- Genre: Rail shooter
- Mode: Single-player
- Arcade system: Namco System 21

Starblade (Note: Japanese: スターブレード, Hepburn: Sutāburēdo) is a 1991 rail shooter video game developed and published by Namco for arcades. Controlling the starfighter FX-01 "GeoSword" from a first-person perspective, the player is tasked with eliminating the Unknown Intelligent Mechanized Species (UIMS) before they wipe out Earth. Gameplay involves controlling a crosshair with a flight yoke stick and destroying enemies and their projectiles before they inflict damage on the player.

Starblade was directed by Hajime Nakatani. A successor to Namco's Galaxian3: Project Dragoon theme park attraction, it began as a prototype for a single-player version of that game; however, poor feedback from playtesters led to it becoming an original project. The team drew inspiration from Hollywood science fiction films, particularly Star Wars, and wanted the game to have a more cinematic presentation with cutscenes and an orchestral soundtrack. Namco's early experimentation with 3D games, such as Winning Run and Solvalou, made development of the game an easy task. The arcade cabinet featured a concave mirror to give off a sense of depth.

The arcade version of Starblade received critical acclaim, being praised for its 3D graphics and cinematic presentation. It is cited as important and influential on 3D video games, serving as inspiration for games such as Star Fox, Panzer Dragoon, and Rez. Home conversions were released for the 3DO and Sega CD, with a PlayStation remake named Starblade Alpha (Note: Japanese: スターブレードα, Hepburn: Sutāburēdo Arufā) being released a year later. These versions were less well-received, being criticized for their low replay value and lack of extra content from the arcade release. An arcade sequel, Starblade: Operation Blue Planet, was in development in 2001 and later cancelled.

== Gameplay ==
Arcade version screenshot

Starblade is a 3D rail shooter presented in a first-person perspective. The player assumes control of a starship named the FX-01 "GeoSword" in its mission to destroy a hostile race known as the "Unknown Intelligent Mechanized Species" (UIMS) before they destroy Earth with a powerful superweapon. Gameplay revolves around the player controlling a crosshair and firing at incoming enemies and projectiles. The GeoSword has a shield meter at the bottom-left corner, which will deplete when it is inflicted with enemy fire; when the meter is fully drained, the game ends. The player will need to complete two missions; destroying the power reactor of the superweapon "Red Eye", and eliminating an enemy fortress and a powerful ship named the "Commander". The Commander stalks the player throughout the game, with a fight against it ensuing once both missions are completed.

== Development ==
Development of Starblade was headed by director Hajime Nakatani, with music composed by Shinji Hosoe. The game was a successor to Galaxian3: Project Dragoon, a 1990 theme park attraction originally presented at Expo '90 in Osaka to critical acclaim, later released as an arcade game a year later. The project began as a prototype for a single-player version of that game, titled Galaxian3: One Player Version, however player reception from location testing caused it to instead become an original game. Development lasted about a year and a half with 25 people — Nakatani recalls the team being eager to work on the System 21 hardware created for the game. Inspiration was drawn from various Hollywood science-fiction, notably Star Wars, with the team wanting to create a cinematic-like presentation akin to those films. Thanks to Namco's early experimentation with 3D video games, such as Galaxian3, Winning Run, and Solvalou, the team had little difficulty producing it.

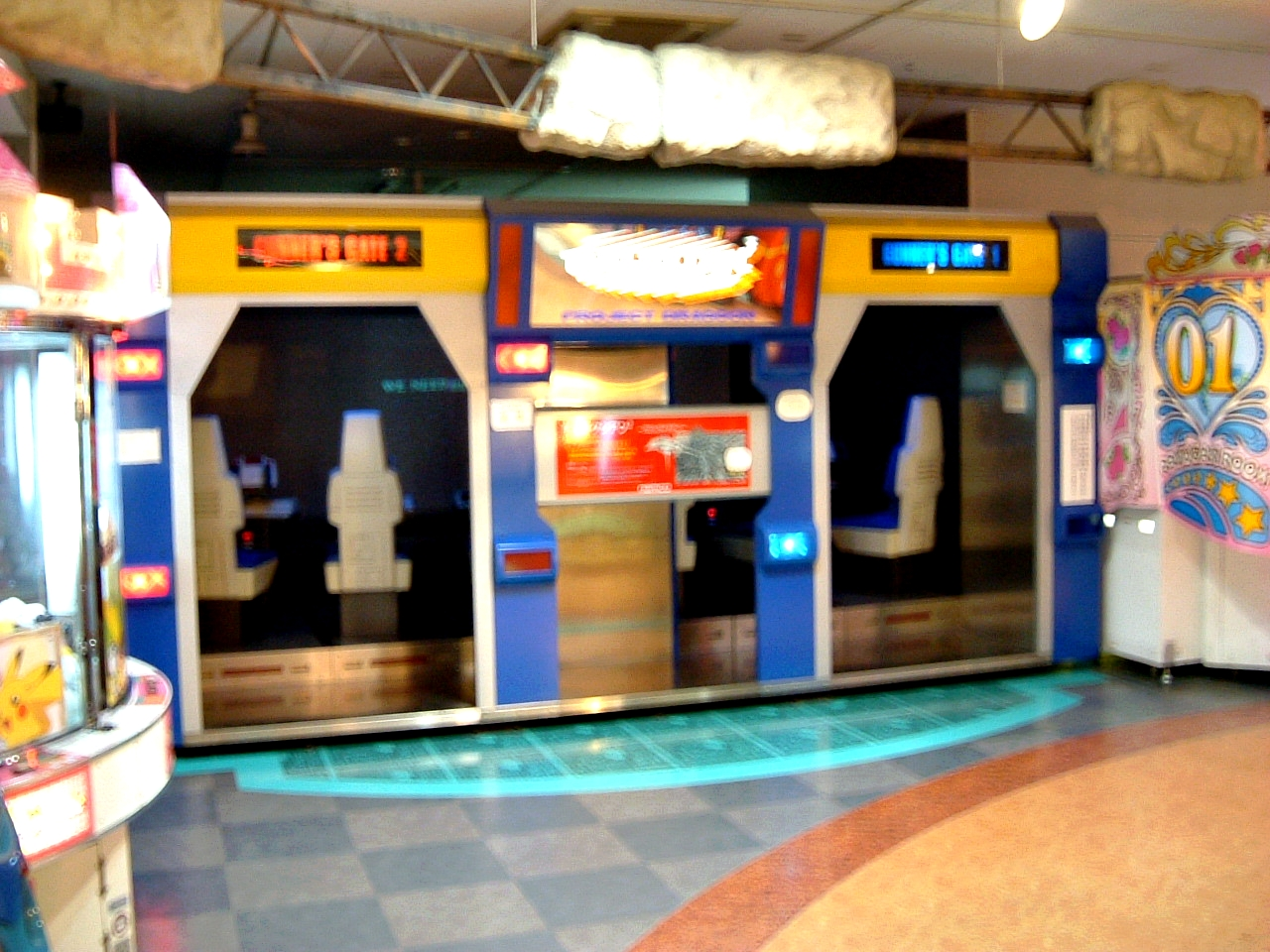
Starblade was initially a single-player version of Galaxian3: Project Dragoon.

The arcade cabinet for the game used a large concave mirror, dubbed the "Infinite Distance Projection" system by Namco, which gave the effect of depth and a more open environment. To check that the mirrors were of quality construction, Nakatani and his team took them into the garden outside Namco's headquarter building to allow them to condense sunlight — he claims that the mirrors became so hot that he was able to fry yakinikku on them. The team toyed with the idea of letting the player control their ship and projectiles, but it was scrapped as it would greatly affect the core gameplay, instead focusing on targeting and shooting enemies. Nakatani states that had the team had more time during development, he would have expressed interest in adding a form of ship control.

== Release ==
Starblade was released for arcades in Japan and North America in September 1991, followed by Europe later that year. The game was showcased at the 1991 Las Vegas Amusement Expo. Japanese promotional material labeled the game as a "Hyper-Entertainment Machine", heavily advertising its cabinet design and 3D shooting gameplay.

The first home ports of Starblade were released for the Sega CD and 3DO in 1994, the former being developed by Thunder Force creator Technosoft. A PlayStation remake, Starblade Alpha, was released in 1995 and, much like the 3DO version, featured an option to replace the game's flat-shaded polygons with textured graphics. Nakatani expressed disappointment with development of Alpha as he and nobody else from the original development team were assigned to the project, instead being farmed out to a different developer. A mobile phone remake was released for Japanese i-Mode devices, but the game's large size caused it to be split into two separate games: Starblade: In Rush and Starblade: Fierce Battle, released respectively in 2003 and 2004. The arcade version appears as the loading screen minigame in Tekken 5, with the full version being available as an unlockable extra. It was digitally re-released onto the Japanese Wii Virtual Console in 2009, featuring support for the Wii Remote's pointer function to replicate the flight yoke controller in the arcade version. A second digital version was released in 2013 for iOS and Android devices as part of Namco Arcade, which itself was discontinued in 2016.

== Reception ==
Reception

Review scores
Publication	Score
AllGame	4/5 (Arcade); 4/5 (3DO); 4/5 (PS1)
Computer and Video Games	87% (Arcade)
Famitsu	8/10, 7/10, 7/10, 6/10 (Mega CD) 8/10, 6/10, 7/10, 7/10 (3DO) 9/10, 6/10, 6/10, 6/10 (PS1)
Next Generation	2/5 (3DO)
Play	68% (PS1)
Dengeki PlayStation	80/100, 55/100, 50/100, 80/100
Leisure Line	Positive (Arcade)
Maximum	2/5 (PS1)

Awards
Publication	Award
Gamest	Best Graphics Award (1st)
Sinclair User	Best Use of 3D Technology

=== Arcade ===
The title was a commercial success for Namco, selling as many arcade units as the company was able to produce. In Japan, Game Machine listed it as one of the most popular arcade games of October 1991.

Starblade was met with critical acclaim upon release, being praised for its cinematic presentation and impressive 3D graphics. Sinclair User gave it the "Best Use of 3D Technology" award, alongside Atari Games' Steel Talons and MicroProse's B.O.T.T.S, praising its technological accomplishments and "finger down-the-throat" gameplay. Computer and Video Games called it a "truly exhilarating experience", highly praising its cinematic atmosphere and 3D graphics. They also praised the game's vibrating seat and cabinet design, but criticized the absence of an option to manually control the ship, as well as the game's short length. In 1998, Japanese publication Gamest named it one of the greatest arcade games of all time, praising its revolutionary 3D graphics and presentation. In 1995, Flux magazine rated the game 96th on their list of the "Top 100 Video Games" Cashbox claimed that the game would take its players "on an exciting journey into space where you become totally absorbed in a challenging battle against enemy starships." They were enamored by its 3D graphics and large arcade cabinet. Retro Gamer called the game a "graceful space ballet", praising its impressive technological capabilities and rail shooter gameplay. Starblade has been recognized as important and influential, serving as inspiration for games such as Star Fox, Panzer Dragoon, and Rez.

=== Ports ===
Home releases were less well-received, many criticizing its slow pace and short length. Reviewing the Sega CD version, GamePro praised the game's graphics and sound effects, and remarked that the highly simplistic gameplay would be unappealing and dull to experienced gamers but enjoyable and challenging to younger players. A similar response was echoed by Famitsu, who praised the game's graphics and faithfulness to the arcade original but criticized its low replay value and lack of extra features. GamePro praised the graphics and sound effects of the 3DO version, particularly the ability to choose between polygon graphics and texture-enhanced graphics, but criticized that elements such as the absence of power-ups and the slow movement of the aiming cursor make the game frustratingly difficult. A reviewer for Next Generation disliked the game's short length and lack of content, saying that "as it is, there's just not enough there." In their review of Starblade Alpha, Maximum commented that the original arcade version had exceptionally pleasing graphics but very limited on-rails gameplay, and that the conversion's lack of extra features and slow-paced gameplay made it a hard sell. GamePro's brief review criticized that it was unchanged from the year-old 3DO version, unfavorably comparing it to Panzer Dragoon II on the Sega Saturn.

== Cancelled sequel ==
A sequel game, Starblade: Operation Blue Planet, was being produced for the Namco System 246 arcade hardware in 2001. It was being produced for a new arcade cabinet named the "Over Reality Booster System" (O.R.B.S.), which featured a vibrating seat, dome-shaped screen, and air blowers that reacted with the game. The game was presented at the 2001 Amusement Operator's Union (AOU) tradeshow hosted in Osaka, Japan, having a 75-minute wait time to play it. Despite its favorable reception, the game was quietly cancelled alongside the O.R.B.S. cabinet, with high production costs being attributed to its cancellation. In a 2015 interview with Kazushi Imoto, lead producer for Bandai Namco's Star Wars Battle Pod, he noted that Starblade: Operation Blue Planet and other similar cancelled projects could see a potential release if there is enough fan demand.
