= LightBike =

Mobile game series

- Developer: Pankaku
- Series: LightBike Series
- Platforms: iOS, Android
- Release: January 29, 2009
- Genre: Snake
- Modes: Single-player, multiplayer

LightBike is a snake game inspired by the movie Tron. It was developed by Japanese studio Pankaku and released on January 29, 2009 for iOS. It was followed by LightBike 2. As of 2023, the game has been delisted from App Store.

== Gameplay ==
LightBike plays similarly to the light cycle sequences in the Tron movies. The player controls a motorcycle that shoots out a wall of light from behind. To defeat enemies, the wall can be guided in front of opposing bikes, causing them to crash on impact. The game can be played with other people over the Internet; this feature is limited in the free version. The full version of LightBike unlocks local and online multiplayer.

== Reception ==
MacWorld gave LightBike a rating of 4/5 stars, writing "Pankaku has done a great job with LightBike and for £1.79 on the App Store, there's no better way to kill 10 minutes. (Note that a free lite version is available, though only with a single-player mode.) With room to grow, it'll be interesting to see what happens in the next few updates and what the company chooses to add. " SlideToPlay gave the game a rating of 2 out of 4, concluding "LightBike doesn't do enough to keep you interested over the long term."

== Sequel ==
LightBike 2 is the second installment of the series. It includes additional customization, power ups, and maps, as well as a tournament mode and servers made by other players as of 2017.

148Apps gave LightBike 2 3.5/5 stars, writing "While Light Bike 2 does a good job of mimicking a TRON light cycle battle, it doesn't build a strong enough game around that experience to encourage prolonged play. Network issues also plague the game." KnowyourMobile wrote "After that, all we can hope is that Disney's lawyers don't come down on LightBike 2 once Tron: Legacy is ready for release on the iPhone, but if we were the developer we wouldn't be holding our breath. This game isn't likely to survive the movie marketing, so if it sounds appealing, don't dally". MacLife listed the game in an article entitled The 7 Best TRON Games for iOS and Mac, commenting "LightBike 2's instructions, settings, and eye candy are minimal, but what really makes the game glow is its choice of arenas. Okay, there are only two choices: one is a standard grid, but the second features multiple grids at different heights, allowing for jumps to lower platforms and desperate escapes up ramps. It's completely baffling for human and AI opponents alike, and dizzying fun for Tron fans."
