= Final Lap R =

1993 video game

- Developer: Namco
- Publisher: Namco
- Platform: Arcade
- Release: JP: January 11, 1993; WW: March 1, 1993
- Genre: Racing
- Modes: Single-player, multiplayer
- Arcade system: Namco System FL

Final Lap R (ファイナルラップR, Fainaru Rappu Āru) is a racing arcade game which was released by Namco in 1993. It is the fifth and final game in the Final Lap series, and was licensed by FOCA to Fuji Television (as shown on its title screen). Like its predecessors, it allows up to eight players to play simultaneously when four two-player cabinets are linked together (but Player 4 and 8's car is now affiliated with Benetton replacing Tyrrell from the previous game) - and it also features four new tracks set in Germany, Hungary, Belgium and Brazil.

== Reception ==
In Japan, Game Machine listed Final Lap R in its March 15, 1993 issue as being the country's third most popular upright arcade game at the time. It went on to be the eighth highest-grossing dedicated arcade game of 1993 in Japan.

A reviewer for the French publication Consoles Plus described it as "the swan song of 2D F1 simulation games", and admired its graphics and fast-paced gameplay.
