= Four Trax =

1989 video game

- Japanese promotional sales flyer.
- Developer: Namco
- Publishers: JP: Namco; NA: Atari Games; EU: Brent Leisure
- Platforms: Arcade, Mega Drive/Genesis
- Release: EU: October 1989; JP: November 1989; NA: 1989
- Genre: Racing
- Modes: Single-player, multiplayer

Four Trax (Note: Japanese: フォートラックス, Hepburn: Fō Torakkusu) is a 1989 racing video game developed and published by Namco for arcades. It was released in North America by Atari Games. It was ported to the Mega Drive/Genesis in 1991 as Quad Challenge.

== Gameplay ==
Players take control of four quad bikes (red for Player 1, white for Player 2, yellow for Player 3, and green for Player 4), which are competing in an "off-road" race. They all have a preset amount of time in which to complete a full lap of the track, but for each lap of the track that is successfully completed, the players' time is extended. If one of the players cannot manage to successfully complete the current lap of the track before the time runs out, that player's game will instantly be over and the race will continue without them. The players must complete between three and six full laps of the track in order to win (the number is dependent on how both of the cabinets are set, as with Namco's own Final Lap). The players can also encounter between four and seven blue CPU-controlled bikes on the track, as the number is dependent on how many people are playing (seven for one player, six for two players, five for three, and four for four).

== Reception and legacy ==
Reception

Review scores
Publication	Score
Computer and Video Games	89% (Arcade)
Beep! Mega Drive	5.5/10 (Mega Drive)
Sega-16	6/10 (Genesis)

In North America, the arcade version was the top-grossing new video game on the RePlay arcade charts in April 1990. The Sega Genesis version was released with little commercial fanfare, and it never made major sales figures.

Four Trax is considered to be one of the first off-road racing games for a console system. It was released more than 10 years before ATV Offroad Fury for the PlayStation 2 brought the genre into the 21st century, but it has become a niche genre again since THQ discontinued their MX vs. ATV series. Even prior to the cancellation of the MX vs. ATV series, driving an ATV around closed-circuit tracks never appealed much to the mainstream audience of gamers.
