= Ordyne =

1988 video game

- Japanese arcade flyer
- Developer: Namco
- Publishers: JP: Namco; NA: NEC
- Composer: Shinji Hosoe
- Platforms: Arcade, TurboGrafx-16
- Release: Arcade: JP: September 1988; TurboGrafx-16: JP: September 8, 1989; NA: March 1990
- Genre: Scrolling shooter
- Modes: Single-player, multiplayer
- Arcade system: Namco System 2

Ordyne (Note: Japanese: オーダイン, Hepburn: Ōdain) is a horizontally scrolling shooter developed and published by Namco. It was released as an arcade video game in September 1988, only in Japan. A conversion to the TurboGrafx-16 was released in 1989 and internationally in March 1990 by NEC.

== Gameplay ==
An arcade screenshot showing Yūichirō confronting the game's first boss.

Players take control of the genius scientist Yuichiro Tomari and his Chinese assistant Sunday Chin as they attempt to rescue Tomari's fiancée, Kana Aibara from the evil Dr. Kubota and his army of robotic minions. The enemies all follow preset patterns, and killing a group of smaller ones or a larger one leaves crystals behind that can be collected and exchanged for special weapons, extra lives, and even more crystals at a shop or by defeating a robot. This game has a total of seven levels, and a boss is fought at the end of each one. One hit will kill Yūichirō and Sunday, unless either of them has a power-up cameo appearance of Pac-Man which can tank one hit for the characters.

== Reception ==
Reception

Review scores
Publication	Score
Famitsu	28/40
IGN	7/10
Nintendo Life	7/10
PC Engine FAN	22.54/30
Power Play	
TurboPlay	7/10

In Japan, Game Machine listed Ordyne as the second most successful table arcade unit of October 1988.

== Legacy ==
The game was included in Namco Museum Volume 4 for the Sony PlayStation. The TurboGrafx-16 version was released on the Wii's Virtual Console in 2007. Hamster Corporation released the arcade version outside Japan for the first time as part of their Arcade Archives series for the Nintendo Switch and PlayStation 4 in October 2022.
