= Final Lap =

1987 video game

- Japanese arcade flyer
- Developer: Namco; Famicom: JP: Arc System Works
- Publishers: JP/EU: Namco; NA: Atari Games
- Composer: Shinji Hosoe
- Series: Final Lap
- Platforms: Arcade, Family Computer
- Release: Arcade: JP: September 1987; EU: February 1988; NA: May 1988; Famicom: JP: August 12, 1988
- Genre: Racing simulation
- Modes: Single-player, multiplayer
- Arcade system: Namco System 2

Final Lap (Note: Japanese: ファイナルラップ, Hepburn: Fainaru Rappu) is a 1987 racing simulation video game developed and published by Namco. Atari Games released the game in North America in 1988. It was the first game to run on Namco's then-new System 2 hardware and is a direct successor to Namco's Pole Position (1982) and Pole Position II (1983). It was ported to the Famicom by Arc System Works, making it Arc System Works' debut game.

Final Lap was the first racing game to allow up to eight players to simultaneously race on the Suzuka Circuit in a Formula One race. This was, at the time, considered a revolutionary feature, and was implemented by linking together up to four two-player sitdown-style arcade cabinets.

There was also a single-player mode, in which the player's score was based on how far the car traveled until time ran out or if the player completed four laps. It was a major commercial success in Japan, becoming the third highest-grossing arcade game of 1988, the highest-grossing dedicated arcade game of 1989, and second highest dedicated arcade game of 1990.

Hamster Corporation released the game as part of their Arcade Archives series for the Nintendo Switch and PlayStation 4, as well as their Arcade Archives 2 series for the Nintendo Switch 2, PlayStation 5 and Xbox Series X/S in March 2026.

== Gameplay ==
Preparing to turn a corner (arcade)

The player drives Formula One cars of the 1987 season and may choose between Williams-Honda, Lotus-Honda, McLaren-Porsche, or March-Cosworth. 1987 was the first year a Formula One grand prix was held on the Suzuka Circuit, the main track in the game. The track layout is reproduced accurately, going so far as to include sponsor billboards, but the length is greatly shortened, and it takes less than forty seconds to complete one lap in the game.

The Famicom version is mostly unrelated to the original arcade game, including more tracks and somewhat simpler game play. The Famicom version features both a single-player and two-player split screen mode. The game uses an upgrade system, rather than different cars. The game will slowly increase the computer controlled car's difficulty, requiring the player to continuously upgrade the car in order to keep up. The upgrades consist of engine upgrades, brake upgrades, tire upgrades, and extra boost. The game was released in Japan on August 12, 1988.

== Reception ==
Reception

Review scores
Publication	Score
AllGame	3/5
Computer and Video Games	Positive
Sinclair User	9/10
Commodore User	5/5

Final Lap was a major commercial success in Japan, where it remained one of the most-popular and profitable arcade games, being towards the top of arcade earnings charts for three consecutive years. It was Japan's third highest-grossing arcade game of 1988 (below After Burner and Operation Wolf), and went on to become Japan's highest-grossing dedicated arcade game of 1989. It was later Japan's second highest-grossing dedicated arcade game of 1990 (below Super Monaco GP).

The game received positive reviews from critics. Clare Edgeley of Computer and Video Games called it "a first class racing sim" that is "tremendously addictive" especially in multiplayer mode and a "definitive must" for all racing drivers.

== Legacy ==
Final Lap was followed by Final Lap 2 in 1990 which featured courses in Japan, the United States, Italy, and Monaco, Final Lap 3 in 1992, which featured courses in England, France, San Marino, and Spain; and Final Lap R in 1993, which featured courses in Belgium, Brazil, Germany, and Hungary, and the cars of the 1992 Formula One World Championship.

There were also a number of spin-offs: a racing-RPG Final Lap Twin released for the TurboGrafx-16 in 1989; and Final Lap 2000 and Final Lap Special, a pair of games released for the WonderSwan and WonderSwan Color respectively.
