= Namco Museum Archives =

2020 video game compilation

- Japanese box art featuring a Pac-Man Famicom cartridge
- Developers: M2; B.B. Studio
- Publisher: Bandai Namco Entertainment
- Series: Namco Museum
- Platforms: Nintendo Switch, Windows, PlayStation 4, Xbox One
- Release: WW: June 18, 2020
- Genre: Various
- Modes: Single-player, multiplayer

Namco Museum Archives, known in Japan as Namcot Collection (Note: Japanese: ナムコットコレクション, Hepburn: Namukotto Korekushon), is a 2020 video game compilation published by Bandai Namco Entertainment. Originally released in Japan for the Nintendo Switch, it was localized for international territories as two separate collections, Namco Museum Archives Vol. 1 and Vol. 2, for the Switch, Xbox One, PlayStation 4, and Windows. Namcot Collection includes a wide array of video games published by Namco for the Family Computer and Nintendo Entertainment System, with save states, achievements, and homebrew ports of Pac-Man Championship Edition and Gaplus.

Bandai Namco enlisted the help of M2, a company recognized for its high-quality video game re-releases, to develop the game. Assisting M2 was B.B. Studio, a Bandai Namco subsidiary known for its work on the Super Robot Wars series. The game was released in Japan as a free digital app and a physical release, the former allowing its users to buy individual games or in select packs; as players began receiving the wrong games after purchasing them individually, Bandai Namco was forced to pull it from the Nintendo eShop temporarily.

The localized releases were praised for their emulation quality and game library, particularly Pac-Man Championship Edition, though the lackluster presentation and Bandai Namco's decision to split the collection in two was the subject of criticism from western fans. The Collection received a physical release in Asian regions only.

== Games ==
The menu interface in Namco Museum Archives is designed after a collector's shelf.

Namco Museum Archives is a compilation of video games published by Namcot, the Japanese consumer game division of Namco, for the Family Computer (Famicom) and Nintendo Entertainment System (NES). The majority of the game library consists of games developed in-house by Namco, although some were developed by external companies like Game Freak and Atlus.

Some of the titles are conversions of popular Namco arcade games, including Pac-Man (1980) and Galaga (1981), while others like Splatterhouse: Wanpaku Graffiti (1989) were created specifically for the Famicom and NES. The included titles encompass a wide variety of genres, notably action role-playing, shoot 'em up, and platforming. The collection also presents two homebrew ports of Gaplus (1984) and Pac-Man Championship Edition (2007), which were designed by M2 and are exclusive to the package.

Players can save their progress and "rewind" back a few seconds in gameplay to make certain games easier to play. Certain games, such as Sky Kid, feature simultaneous multiplayer.

In the Japanese Nintendo Switch release, the main menu is designed after a collector's shelf. Players can customize their shelf with boxes, game cartridges, and plastic figurines based on each of the included games. Artwork and manual scans are also included. The way the games are distributed differs from each version: in the Japanese version, players can purchase games either individually or in select packs.

Packs that are purchased are indicated by magazine issues on the player's shelf, designed after the front covers of Namco's Community Magazine NG press literature. The international Archives releases omit this decision, with both volumes containing a varied selection of titles.

Games included in Namcot Collection/Namco Museum Archives
Title	Genre	Original release	Developer	DLC Pack (Japan)	Volume (International)	JP	INT
Battle City	Top-down shooter	September 9, 1985	Namco	DLC Pack 1	Volume 2	Yes	Yes
Dig Dug	Maze	June 4, 1985	Namco	DLC Pack 3	Volume 1	Yes	Yes
Dig Dug II	Maze	April 18, 1986	Namco	N/A	Volume 2	No	Yes
Digital Devil Story: Megami Tensei	Role-playing	September 11, 1987	Atlus	DLC Pack 3	N/A	Yes	No
Dragon Buster	Action role-playing	January 7, 1987	Namco	DLC Pack 2	Volume 1	Yes	Yes
Dragon Buster II: Yami no Fuuin	Maze	April 27, 1989	Namco	N/A	Volume 2	No	Yes
Dragon Spirit: The New Legend	Vertical-scrolling shooter	April 14, 1989	Namco	DLC Pack 1	Volume 1	Yes	Yes
Family Circuit	Racing	January 6, 1988	Game Studio	DLC Pack 2	N/A	Yes	No
Family Jockey	Horse racing	April 24, 1987	Namco	DLC Pack 1	N/A	Yes	No
Galaga	Fixed shooter	February 15, 1985	Namco	DLC Pack 1	Volume 2	Yes	Yes
Galaxian	Fixed shooter	September 7, 1984	Namco	DLC Pack 2	Volume 1	Yes	Yes
Gaplus	Fixed shooter	August 20, 2020	M2	Bonus Game (Note: Bonus for purchasing 20 games)	Volume 2	Yes	Yes
Kaijū Monogatari	Role-playing	November 18, 1988	Birthday	DLC Pack 2	N/A	Yes	No
King of Kings	Strategy	July 22, 1988	Atlus	DLC Pack 3	N/A	Yes	No
Legacy of the Wizard	Action role-playing	July 17, 1987	Nihon Falcom	N/A	Volume 2	No	Yes
Mappy	Platform	November 14, 1984	Namco	DLC Pack 2	Volume 1	Yes	Yes
Mappy-Land	Platform	November 26, 1986	Namco	N/A	Volume 2	No	Yes
Mendel Palace	Action puzzle	June 27, 1989	Game Freak	DLC Pack 1	Volume 2	Yes	Yes
Metro-Cross	Platform	December 16, 1986	Namco	DLC Pack 3	N/A	Yes	No
Namco Classic II	Golf	March 13, 1992	Namco	DLC Pack 3	N/A	Yes	No
Pac-Land	Platform	November 21, 1985	Namco	DLC Pack 2	Volume 2	Yes	Yes
Pac-Man	Maze	November 2, 1984	Namco	DLC Pack 1	Volume 1	Yes	Yes
Pac-Man Championship Edition	Maze	June 18, 2020	M2	Bonus Game (Note: Bonus for purchasing 10 games. Included in the Japanese physical release.)	Volume 1	Yes	Yes
The Quest of Ki	Puzzle platform	January 6, 1988	Game Studio	DLC Pack 3	N/A	Yes	No
Rock 'n Ball	Pinball	March 23, 1989	KID	DLC Pack 3	N/A	Yes	No
Rolling Thunder	Platform	March 17, 1989	Namco	DLC Pack 2	Volume 2	Yes	Yes
Sky Kid	Horizontal-scrolling shooter	August 22, 1986	Namco	DLC Pack 3	Volume 1	Yes	Yes
Splatterhouse: Wanpaku Graffiti	Hack'n slash	July 31, 1989	Namco	DLC Pack 1	Volume 1	Yes	Yes
Star Luster	Space combat simulator	December 6, 1985	Namco	DLC Pack 1	N/A	Yes	No
Super Xevious: GAMP no Nazo	Vertical-scrolling shooter	September 19,1986	Namco	N/A	Volume 2	No	Yes
Tenkaichi Bushi Keru Nagūru	Fighting	July 21, 1989	Game Studio	DLC Pack 2	N/A	Yes	No
Tower of Babel	Puzzle	July 18, 1986	Namco	DLC Pack 3	N/A	Yes	No
The Tower of Druaga	Action role-playing	August 6,1985	Namco	DLC Pack 1	Volume 1	Yes	Yes
Valkyrie no Bōken: Toki no Kagi Densetsu	Role-playing	August 1, 1986	Namco	DLC Pack 2	N/A	Yes	No
Wagyan Land	Platform	February 9, 1989	Namco	Bundled Game (Note: Included in the free version and the Japanese physical release)	N/A	Yes	No
Warpman	Maze	July 12, 1985	Namco	DLC Pack 2	N/A	Yes	No
Xevious	Vertical-scrolling shooter	November 8, 1984	Namco	DLC Pack 3	Volume 1	Yes	Yes
Yōkai Dōchūki	Platform	June 24, 1988	Namco	DLC Pack 1	N/A	Yes	No

== Development ==
Namcot Collection was developed by M2, a Japanese developer which previous worked on Sega Ages, and published by Bandai Namco Entertainment. M2 was assisted by Bandai Namco subsidiary B.B. Studio, the development group for the modern-day Super Robot Wars games. The included homebrew port of Pac-Man Championship Edition, designed to work on real Famicom hardware, was originally the creation of a Japanese ROM hacker from 2008, who out of legal concerns chose not to release his work to the public. For Namcot Collection, Bandai Namco acquired the rights to the hack and provided minor changes, such as altering the soundtrack.

== Release ==
Bandai Namco revealed Namcot Collection during a Japanese Nintendo Direct hosted on March 26, 2020. Originally thought to remain exclusive to Japan, it was revealed on June 4 that Namcot Collection would be localized and split into two separate collections titled Namco Museum Archives Vol. 1 and Namco Museum Archives Vol. 2 internationally, retrofitted under the company's existing Namco Museum series of similar collections. Namcot Collection and its Archives localizations were released on June 18, 2020.

The former was released exclusively for the Nintendo Switch, while the latter was published on the Switch, Xbox One, PlayStation 4, and PC via Steam. In Japan, the game was released for free on the Nintendo eShop, which includes Wagan Land as a free game and has players purchase additional games separately or in packs. A physical version was published the same day that includes the first wave of games. Bandai Namco pulled the digital version from sale the same day after an error was discovered that gave players the incorrect game after purchasing individual games from the store. The game was relisted with the defect corrected on July 8.

== Reception ==
Reception

Review scores
Publication	Score
Eurogamer	5/10
Nintendo Life	7/10 (Vol. 1); 6/10 (Vol. 2)
Nintendo World Report	7/10 (Vol. 1); 7.5/10 (Vol. 2)
Push Square	6/10
The Games Machine	6.4/10

The localized releases of Namcot Collection drew mixed responses from critics. The PlayStation 4 version of both Archives volumes respectively hold a 62/100 and 61/100 on the review aggregator website Metacritic, indicating "mixed or average reviews". As of August 30 2020, 11,850 copies of the physical version of Namcot Collection have been sold in Japan.

Critics were particularly disappointed in the Archives releases for their inferiority to the Japanese original. Nintendo Life was critical of their omission of the collector's shelf from the Japanese version, as without it the collections felt very barren of content. The Games Machine agreed, and added the exclusion of artwork scans and other bonus material made it feel inferior to other similar collections already on the market. The Italian division of Eurogamer believed the Archives games, with its exclusion of artwork scans and bonus content, had no reason to bear the Namco Museum name.

Bandai Namco's decision to split up Namcot Collection for international territories was negatively-received, with critics finding the idea pointless and confusing. Push Square said that both games' usage of the same menu interface and functionalities "raises the uncomfortable question of why these collections had to be separated into two volumes at all." They believed its method of distribution only made them worthwhile for hardcore Namco fans.

Most reviewers enjoyed the emulation quality and selection of titles, particularly Pac-Man Championship Edition and Splatterhouse: Wanpaku Graffiti. Nintendo World Report showed admiration towards Mendal Palace, Battle City, and Gaplus for their polished design; they especially praised Gaplus for the quality of its conversion, complementing that it made for a nice companion for Galaga. The Games Machine agreed, and felt that the collections hosted a nice selection of quality titles, like Rolling Thunder. However, they argued it would only appeal to players that grew up playing the NES, believing that otherwise they provided little incentive for newcomers to purchase them.

Mappy-Land and Dragon Buster were seen as the worst inclusions, with Super Xevious and Pac-Land also being disliked for their quality. 4Gamer.net showed disappointment in Namcot Collection for its library consisting exclusively of NES and Famicom games, and believed the collection could have been more interesting had it included games from systems such as the MSX, PC Engine, and Sega Mega Drive. While critics felt that the arcade game conversions were still fun to play, they generally agreed that they were not as good as their coin-op predecessors, and that they should have been included in addition to their console counterparts.
