= List of Xevious media =

Xevious
- Genre: Vertical-scrolling shooter
- Developer: Namco
- Publishers: Namco; Bandai Namco Entertainment
- Creator: Masanobu Endo
- Platform: List: Arcade, Family Computer, Apple II, PC-88, Atari ST, Commodore 64, Amstrad CPC, ZX Spectrum, Atari 7800, Sharp X1, X68000, NES, MSX2, Famicom Disk System, PC Engine, PlayStation, Mobile phone, Windows, Sharp Zaurus, Game Boy Advance, Xbox 360, PlayStation 3, Wii, Nintendo 3DS, iOS
- First release: Xevious; January 1983
- Latest release: Xevious Resurrection; January 29, 2009

Xevious is a franchise of shoot 'em up video games published by Bandai Namco Entertainment, formerly Namco. Xevious, the first title in the franchise, was released for arcades in January 1983 in Japan and a month later in North America by Atari, Inc. It was created by Masanobu Endō, who also designed The Tower of Druaga. The game has received many sequels, spin-offs, and re-imaginings, the most recent being Xevious Resurrection in 2009. Xevious games have been ported to many platforms and compiled into several Namco compilations. The franchise contains twelve games—seven mainline entries and five spin-offs—soundtrack albums, pachinko machines, and an animated feature film produced by Groove Corporation.

Gameplay in the series consists of controlling a spaceship named the Solvalou throughout a series of levels, shooting at enemies and avoiding their projectiles. The Solvalou has two weapons, an air zapper that destroys air-based enemies and a blaster bomb that destroys ground-based enemies. Later games introduce mechanics such as additional playable ships, power-ups, protective shields, and two-player co-operative play. Critics have labeled Xevious as one of the most important games of its kind. It is one of the first vertically scrolling shooters and among the first video games to implement bosses, pre-rendered visuals, and a cohesive world and storyline. Xevious inspired games such as Gradius, TwinBee, Zanac, and RayForce. It has had an influence on game designers such as Satoshi Tajiri and musicians like Haruomi Hosono. A variety of objects and characters also appear in Shadow Labyrinth, a reimagining of the Pac-Man franchise.

== Video games ==
Game	Details
Xevious Original release date(s): JP: January 1983; NA: February 1983	Release years by system: 1983 – Arcade; 1984 – Family Computer, Apple II; 1985 – PC-88; 1986 – Atari 7800; 1987 – Commodore 64, Atari ST, Amstrad CPC, ZX Spectrum; 1988 – Nintendo Entertainment System; 1990 – Famicom Disk System; 2001 – Windows, Sharp Zaurus; 2002 – Mobile phone (i-Appli), Java; 2004 – Game Boy Advance; 2007 – Xbox 360; 2009 – Wii Virtual Console; 2010 – Mobile phone (i-Mode); 2011 – Nintendo 3DS
Xevious Original release date(s): JP: January 1983; NA: February 1983	Notes: Published in North America by Atari, Inc.; Designed by Masanobu Endo with assistance by Shigeki Toyama and Hiroshi Ono.; Recorded record-breaking sales figures during its first weeks on the market, which had not been seen in Japan since Space Invaders.; The Family Computer version sold over one million copies and become the system's first killer app.; The Nintendo Entertainment System (NES) version was released for the Game Boy Advance under the Classic NES Series.; Star Fox Assault contains the NES version as an unlockable extra.; The 3DS version is titled 3D Classics Xevious and was developed by Nintendo and Arika.; As part of a collaboration with Coca-Cola, a Flash browser remake named Sprite × Xevious was released in 2012.
Super Xevious Original release date(s): JP: December 1984	Release years by system: 1984 – Arcade; 1987 – X68000
Super Xevious Original release date(s): JP: December 1984	Notes: An updated version of the original.; Features multiple differences, such as new enemy types and faster gameplay.; The X68000 version was produced by Dempa.; Included as a hidden game in Namco Classic Collection Vol. 1 and Namco Museum DS.
Grobda Original release date(s): JP: October 1984; NA: September 1985	Release years by system: 1984 – Arcade; 1985 – PC-8801; 1986 – Sharp X1; 2009 – Wii Virtual Console
Grobda Original release date(s): JP: October 1984; NA: September 1985	Notes: A spin-off starring an enemy tank from the original.; Designed by Masanobu Endo.; Published in North America by Magic Electronics.; A "remixed" minigame version is included in Namco Museum Megamix.
Super Xevious: GAMP no Nazo Original release date(s): JP: September 19, 1986	Release years by system: 1986 – Family Computer, arcade
Super Xevious: GAMP no Nazo Original release date(s): JP: September 19, 1986	Notes: Focuses primarily on puzzle-solving.; Its name translates to Super Xevious: The Riddle of GAMP.; The game was released in arcades for the Nintendo Vs. System, renamed Vs. Super Xevious.
Xevious: Fardraut Saga Original release date(s): JP: December 23, 1988	Release years by system: 1988 – MSX2; 1990 – PC Engine
Xevious: Fardraut Saga Original release date(s): JP: December 23, 1988	Notes: Developed by Compile.; Includes a port of the original Xevious and a new 16-level campaign with new playable ships and power-ups.; The PC Engine version is titled Xevious: Fardraut Densetsu, and has different levels and enemy types.
XVM Original release date(s): JP: March 9, 1990	Release years by system: 1990 – MSX2
XVM Original release date(s): JP: March 9, 1990	Notes: Exclusive to the compilation Disk NG 1.; Carries a more fantasy-like setting, with enemies themed around animals and insects.
Solvalou Original release date(s): JP: December 1991	Release years by system: 1991 – Arcade; 2009 – Wii Virtual Console
Solvalou Original release date(s): JP: December 1991	Notes: 3D rail-shooter spin-off.; The Wii Virtual Console version utilizes the Wii Remote's pointer to recreate the arcade game's flight yoke controller.
Xevious Arrangement Original release date(s): JP: November 1995; NA: 1995	Release years by system: 1995 – Arcade
Xevious Arrangement Original release date(s): JP: November 1995; NA: 1995	Notes: Exclusive to the arcade game Namco Classic Collection Vol. 1.; Features two-player co-op, a wide-shot power-up, and new enemies and bosses.; Completing the game without losing all lives allows access to three extra stages.
Xevious 3D/G Original release date(s): JP: May 1, 1996; NA: 1996	Release years by system: 1996 – Arcade; 1997 – PlayStation; 2015 – PlayStation Network
Xevious 3D/G Original release date(s): JP: May 1, 1996; NA: 1996	Notes: Created for the Namco System 11 hardware.; Features 2D-based gameplay with 3D gouraud-shaded polygonal graphics.; Music was composed by Shinji Hosoe.; The PlayStation version is named Xevious 3D/G+ and includes the original Xevious, Super Xevious, and Xevious Arrangement.; 3D/G+ had slowdown issues in the Japanese and European versions, which were corrected in the North American version.
3D Machiuke Appli: Xevious Original release date(s): JP: July 2001	Release years by system: 2001 – Mobile phone
3D Machiuke Appli: Xevious Original release date(s): JP: July 2001	Notes: Program that lets users look at 3D models of various Xevious craft.; Users can save these models as wallpapers.
Xevious: Scramble Mission Original release date(s): JP: June 15, 2006	Release years by system: 2006 – Plug'n play
Xevious: Scramble Mission Original release date(s): JP: June 15, 2006	Notes: Developed by Bandai.; Exclusive to the "plug'n play" game Namco Nostalgia 1.; A time-attack game where players collect items while flying through tight corridors.
Xevious Resurrection Original release date(s): JP: January 29, 2009; NA: July 16, 2009; EU: April 1, 2010	Release years by system: 2009 – PlayStation 3
Xevious Resurrection Original release date(s): JP: January 29, 2009; NA: July 16, 2009; EU: April 1, 2010	Notes: Developed by Cattle Call.; Exclusive to the compilation Namco Museum Essentials.; Includes two-player multiplayer and a shield power-up system.; Features support for the now-defunct PlayStation Home service.; Was delisted from the PlayStation Store in 2018.

== Other media ==
Title	Release date	Media type
Fardraut	1991	Novel
Notes: A three-part Xevious novel that describes the setting and world of the original game.; Written by Masanobu Endo and published by Futabasha.; Republished in 2005.
Xevious	August 10, 2002	Feature film
Notes: A 75-minute gaiden (side-story) film based on the franchise.; Produced by animation studio Groove Corporation under license from Namco.; Premiered at Theater Ikebukuro and later a summer road show.; Home media releases were cancelled when Groove went out of business, making it a lost film.
CR Xevious WZ; CR Xevious X CR Xevious Y	May 6, 2003	Pachinko
Notes: Pachinko machines produced by Takao.; Features animated cutscenes on an LCD screen.
DOORS Xevious	April 5, 2009	Game show
Notes: A segment from the Japanese game show DOORS.; Contestants had to use foot sensors to destroy waves of Xevious enemies.
Memorial Game Collection Series - Solvalou	April 2013	Model kit
Notes: A plastic model kit of the Solvalou starship.; Produced by Japanese company Wave

=== Soundtracks ===
Title	Release date	Length	Label
Video Game Music	April 23, 1984	30:13	LDK Studio
Notes: An album of Namco chiptune remixes, focusing primarily on Xevious.; Composed by Haruomi Hosono of the band Yellow Magic Orchestra.; Credited as the first video game soundtrack album and an early example of chiptune music.
Super Xevious	Aug 29, 1984	15:44	Alfa Records
Notes: An album with music from Xevious, Gaplus, and The Tower of Druaga.; Composed by Haruomi Hosono.; Re-released on October 1, 2001.
Xevious 3D/G+ Techno Maniax	October 1997	76:46	Pony Canyon
Notes: Part of Pony Canyon's DigiGroove soundtrack series.; Features original tracks and remixes from Xevious 3D/G+.
Namco Sounds - Xevious	September 2, 2009		Namco Sounds
Notes: Digital soundtrack available on iTunes that features music and sound effects from Xevious.; One of the first albums released under the Namco Sounds label.
Xevious 30th Anniversary Tribute	January 29, 2013		Namco Sounds
Notes: Released in commemoration of the franchise's 30th anniversary.; Features remixes of Xevious music tracks and original compositions.
