= Babylonian Castle Saga =

Video game series

- Genre: Action role-playing game
- Developers: Bandai Namco Entertainment; Game Studio
- Publisher: Bandai Namco Entertainment
- Creator: Masanobu Endō
- Platforms: Arcade, Fujitsu FM-7, Nintendo Entertainment System, MSX, Super Famicom, PC-Engine, Game Boy, Game Boy Color, Windows, Mobile phone, PlayStation 2, Wii, Wii U
- First release: The Tower of Druaga; June 1984
- Latest release: The Labyrinth of Druaga; January 13, 2011

The Babylonian Castle Saga (Note: Japanese: バビロニアン・キャッスル・サーガ, Hepburn: Babironian Kyassuru Sāga) is a Japanese role-playing video game franchise developed and published by Bandai Namco Entertainment, formerly Namco, for arcades and home video game platforms. Beginning in 1984 with the arcade title The Tower of Druaga, the series would spawn a total of nine sequel and spin-off games, alongside a manga, soundtrack albums, and two anime series by Gonzo K.K. Later entries in the series would be developed by Endo's personal game company, Game Studio.

The series was created by Masanobu Endō, who had previously created Xevious and Grobda. Much of its characters and setting are inspired from Sumerian and Babylonian mythology, such as The Epic of Gilgamesh and The Tower of Babel. The series stars Prince Gilgamesh, a gold-armored knight, and the maiden Ki, in their efforts to protect the mythical Blue Crystal Rod and seal away Druaga, a four-armed demon who seeks the rod to enslave the human race.

The series is known for its high difficulty and for helping to establish the "notebook carrying" trend for Japanese video games - it would also serve as a prime inspiration for other games to follow, including Ys, Hydlide and The Legend of Zelda. Dragon Quest co-creator Koichi Nakamura has also cited the series as a key inspiration for him. International reviews for the series were mixed, with its difficulty and learning curve often criticized, although praise was given for its musical score and historical importance. Several games in the series would be ported over to both digital storefronts and various Namco video game collection titles in following years.

== List of games ==
Release timeline
1984	The Tower of Druaga
1985
1986	The Return of Ishtar
1987
1988	The Quest of Ki
1989
1990
1991
1992
1993
1994	The Blue Crystal Rod
1995
1996
1997
1998
1999
2000	Seme COM Dungeon: Drururuaga
2001
2002
2003
2004
2005	Druaga Online: The Story of Aon
2005	The Nightmare of Druaga
2006
2007	The Tower of Druaga: The Recovery of Babylim
2008	The Tower of Druaga ~The Phantom of Gilgamesh~
2009
2010
2011	The Labyrinth of Druaga

There are four games in the main series.

- The Tower of Druaga (1984, Namco, arcade)
- The Return of Ishtar (1986, Namco, arcade)
- The Quest of Ki (1988, Namco, Famicom)
- The Blue Crystal Rod (1994, Namco, Super Famicom)

In the game's canon, the chronological order is The Quest of Ki, The Tower of Druaga, The Return of Ishtar, and The Blue Crystal Rod.

Also, some side stories were made, including:

- The Tower of Druaga Darkness Tower (1996): Namco Museum Vol. 3
- The Tower of Druaga Another Tower (1996): Namco Museum Vol. 3, Famicom, Game Boy
- Seme COM Dungeon: Drururuaga (2000): Game Boy Color
- The Nightmare of Druaga: Fushigi no Dungeon (2004): PlayStation 2
- Druaga Online: The Story of Aon (2005): Arcade
- The Tower of Druaga: The Recovery of BABYLIM (2007): PC
- The Labyrinth of Druaga (2011, Namco, Mobile phones)

=== The Tower of Druaga ===
The player assumes the role of the hero Gilgamesh, whose goal is to rescue the maiden Ki (カイ, Kai) from the demon Druaga. In order to do this, he must traverse through 60 floors of an immense tower. Gilgamesh comes equipped with a sword, which he can use to defeat monsters, and a shield, which can be used to block magical attacks.

=== The Return of Ishtar ===
It picks up where Tower of Druaga left off. The player controls two characters: Ki and Gilgamesh. It can also be noted in this game that Ki is a magician, not a damsel in distress like many people believe. The tower now has a few different ways to exit, and the aggregate total of levels is 128 (covering the 60-floor tower).

=== The Quest of Ki ===
The story of The Quest of Ki is actually a prequel to the original Tower of Druaga. It occurs shortly after the demon Druaga has stolen the Blue Crystal Rod and taken it to his tower. The goddess Ishtar sends the priestess Ki to the tower in order to retrieve it. The game then follows her doomed quest to the top of the tower, and leads directly into the story of the original game.

=== The Blue Crystal Rod ===
Also known as "The Destiny of Gilgamesh", this game picks up where Return of Ishtar left off and is the final game in the Tower of Druaga series, according to Namco.

=== The Nightmare of Druaga ===
This game is set three years after the original Tower of Druaga tetralogy. In it, Ki and Gilgamesh are about to be married, only for Ki to be kidnapped by an evil sorceress, Skulld. The game is known for its unforgiving difficulty, as death in the game results in losing all items and half gold, and its harsh penalty for resetting. Should a player reset the game, they will be greeted by Ishtar, who will scold them for "meddling with the flow of time".

Nightmare was not made by Namco, but by two other companies called Arika and Chunsoft. It was far less successful than the prior games, and was even given a low rating in a video game magazine. This game is the fifth in the "Druaga series" (not counting "Drururuaga"), and the eighth in the Mystery Dungeon series.

=== Seme COM Dungeon: Drururuaga ===
This game is placed about 100 years after the original Druaga timeline and stars Gilsh, a descendant of Gilgamesh. Gameplay is best described as a dungeon-building capture the flag with collectible cards. The players use cards to equip character with weapons and spells, and to populate dungeon with monsters. Then the players battle against an opponent and his dungeon (AI or link cable). The players enter the opponent's dungeon via linked teleporters, find the three keys to unlock the crystal, and return it to home base before the opponent does the same. Success yields additional cards. Each item or monster is highly specialized, allowing for different strategic combos. It features many Namco cameos, such as Soulcalibur's Nightmare, the sword Soul Edge, Valkyrie, Pac-Man, and even the enemies from Dig Dug.

=== Druaga Online: The Story of Aon ===
This game is set outside the main chronology of the series, and borrows characters from Namco's Valkyrie series. Gameplay is similar to The Return of Ishtar, only four players may play at the same time; each controlling one of the four available characters: Gil, a young version of Ki, Valkyrie, or an ancient golem named Xeovalga. Players also earn gold from killing enemies that can be used to upgrade equipment.

=== The Tower of Druaga: the Recovery of BABYLIM ===
This game is an MMORPG developed as part of the Tower of Druaga "Animation x Online RPG" project which also includes the anime series The Tower of Druaga: The Aegis of Uruk.

== Anime series ==
An anime series titled "The Tower of Druaga: The Aegis Of Uruk" premiered on April 5, 2008, both on Japanese television and with simultaneous streaming in English on YouTube, Crunchyroll and Bost TV. The series acts as a direct sequel to the original game.
