= Super Xevious: GAMP no Nazo =

1986 video game

Super Xevious: The Mystery of GAMP
- Developers: Namco; Tose
- Publisher: Namco
- Series: Xevious
- Platforms: Family Computer, Arcade
- Release: Family Computer: JP: September 19, 1986; Arcade: JP: 1987
- Genre: Scrolling shooter
- Mode: Single-player
- Arcade system: Nintendo VS. System

Super Xevious: The Mystery of GAMP (Note: Japanese: スーパーゼビウス ガンプの謎, Hepburn: Sūpā Zebiusu Ganpu no Nazo; Super Xevious: The Mystery of GAMP) is a 1986 vertically scrolling shooter video game developed and published by Namco for the Family Computer. It is the sequel to Xevious and the fourth installment in the Xevious franchise overall. The player controls a spaceship named the Solvalou in its mission to destroy a powerful supercomputer named GAMP, which took over Earth during an ice age. GAMP no Nazo features a heavy focus on puzzle-solving, with each of the game's 21 levels posing a puzzle that must be solved to progress.

Created in response to the overwhelming success of the Family Computer port of Xevious, GAMP no Nazo was developed by a separate team from the original game. Series creator Masanobu Endo, opposed the idea of a sequel to his creation and was not involved as he had left Namco in 1985 to form Game Studio. Though they share a similar title and gameplay, GAMP no Nazo is not the same as the arcade game Super Xevious.

GAMP no Nazo was a commercial failure, and its changes to the gameplay of the original received backlash from fans. Critics disliked the difficulty level for being too high and its usage of secrets for being poorly-implemented and overly-complex. This led to a rethinking of the series' direction, with future Xevious sequels omitting many of GAMP no Nazo's design choices. The game was re-released for the Nintendo VS. System arcade game hardware in 1987, and through the Namco Museum Archives Vol. 2 collection in 2020.

== Gameplay ==
The Solvalou destroying waves of enemies in the first level

Super Xevious: GAMP no Nazo is a vertical-scrolling shooter video game, and the sequel to Xevious. The plot involves a supercomputer, General Artificial Matrix Producer (GAMP), taking control of Earth after an ice age freezes the planet and its population. The player's ship, the Solvalou, is deployed to destroy GAMP and the Xevious forces. The game contains 21 levels, referred to as "areas" in-game. Levels scroll automatically as the player is given a free range of movement. Each level has a puzzle that must be solved in order to progress. Puzzles include destroying a certain type of enemy and flying into a specified portion of the screen. If the player fails to complete the puzzle, they are sent back to the beginning of the level.

The Solvalou begins the game with two weapons: a forward-moving projectile that is used to destroy air-based enemies, and an air-to-ground bomb to destroy ground-stationed enemies. A reticle is displayed above the Solvalou that marks where its bombs will land. The Solvalou is able to collect power-up items, indicated by specifically-colored orbs, by rescuing a ship named the Phantom in the second level. Black orbs give the Solvalou a shield that protects it from enemy fire; yellow orbs increase the size of the bomb receptacle and blast radius; and blue orbs allow the Solvalou to shoot forwards and backwards. The Solvalou can also find a special item called the Super Zapper later in the game. The Super Zapper allows the player to destroy enemies known as Bacura, flying metal boards that were previously indestructible in the original game.

== Development ==
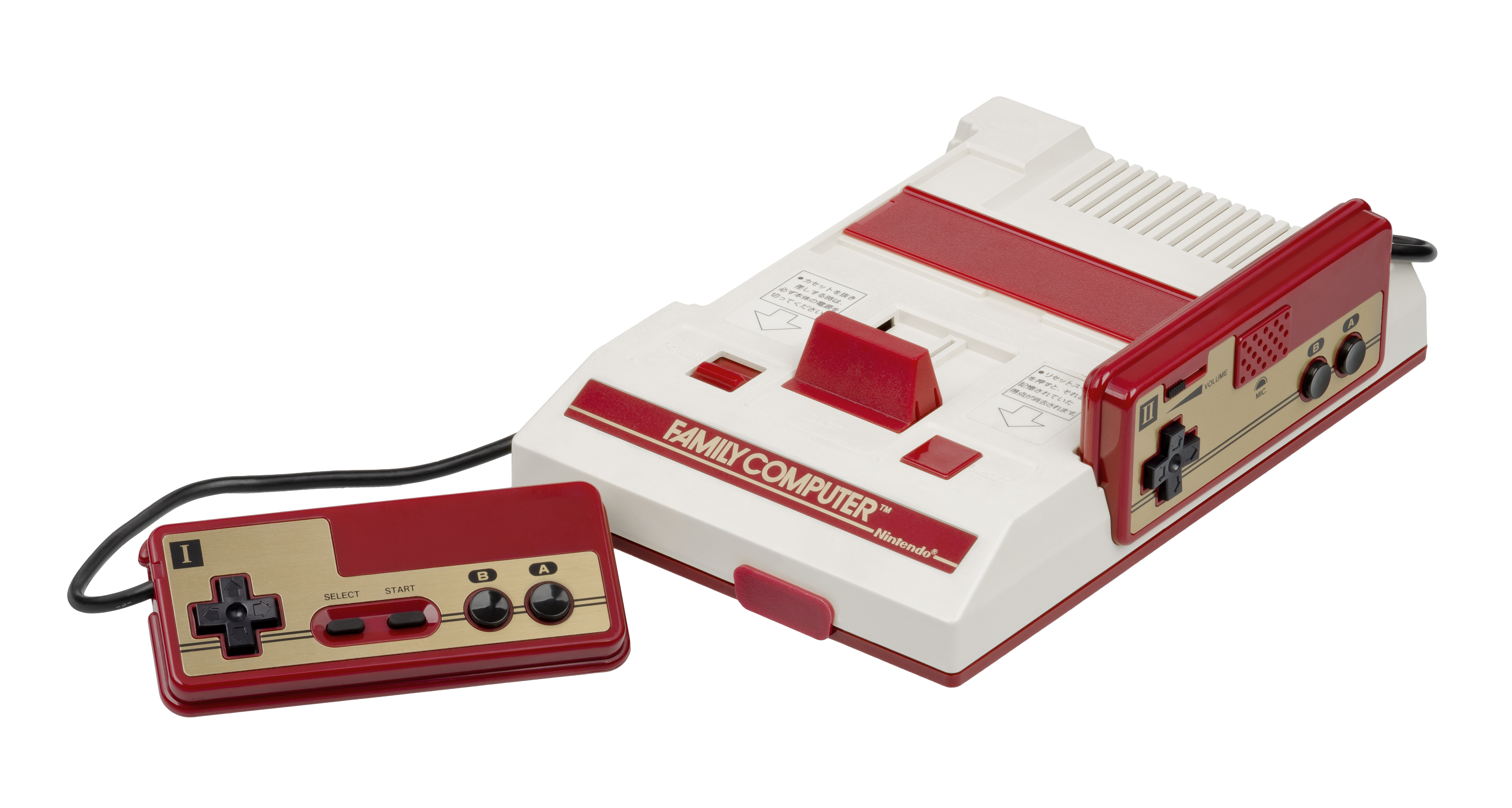
Super Xevious: GAMP no Nazo was created from Namco's efforts to cash in on the success of Xevious, following its overwhelming success on the Family Computer (pictured above).

Super Xevious: GAMP no Nazo was designed by Namco as a sequel to the original Xevious. Development was assisted by Tose, a company that produces games for other developers. GAMP no Nazo was not designed by series creator Masanobu Endo, as a year before its release he left Namco to form his own company, Game Studio. Endo was against the idea of a sequel to Xevious as he felt it was unnecessary. The overwhelming success of the Family Computer home version of Xevious prompted Namco to disregard Endo's wishes, and create a sequel to cash in on the game's popularity. Despite its similar title and gameplay, GAMP no Nazo and the arcade game Super Xevious have little in common. The game's title translates to The Mystery of GAMP or The Riddle of GAMP, a nod to the game's usage of puzzle-solving and mystery.

GAMP no Nazo was published on September 19, 1986, in Japan. The game was packaged in a long plastic box with a reflective gold cartridge shell, similar to Nintendo's The Legend of Zelda. It is the first Namco game on the Family Computer to not use a collection number on its packaging, a common feature for Namco's previous games on the console.

In 1987, GAMP no Nazo was released in arcades for the Nintendo VS. System, where it was renamed VS. Super Xevious. The arcade version was made to be much harder than its home console counterpart, with enemies becoming much more aggressive and power-ups becoming scarce. A board game based on GAMP no Nazo was published the same year, where the objective is to get to the end of the board without getting hit by enemies or losing a "Solvalou marker". GAMP no Nazo is included in Namco Museum Archives Vol. 2, a collection of Namco-published Nintendo Entertainment System games released on June 18, 2020. The arcade version was released by Hamster Corporation as part of their Arcade Archives series for the Nintendo Switch and PlayStation 4 on April 11, 2024, under the English title VS. Super Xevious: Mystery of GUMP.

== Reception ==
Reception

Review scores
Publication	Score
Family Computer Magazine	20.98/30
Yuge	Positive

Super Xevious: GAMP no Nazo was a commercial failure, and struggled to gain sales. Because of its changes to the gameplay of its predecessor, it has since gained a negative reputation from fans, who believe it discards what they felt made the original Xevious so great. Its failure has been attributed to the release of games such as Gradius, which raised the bar for what the genre should be like.

The game received mixed reviews. The staff at Family Computer Magazine felt indifferent towards the game's usage of puzzle-solving, believing it would surely be a "controversial" change with Xevious fans. Staff argued that the puzzle element was poorly implemented and that the game should have been more straightforward like its predecessor. At the same time, they welcomed the addition of power-up items and new level themes. Overall, they believed it was an average shooter with ill-considered game mechanics. In their 1991 mook, they noted that readers were rather critical of the game for its sound, graphics, and for being largely inferior to the original game.

Retrospective feedback has been equally mixed. In 2003, the author of book Yuge briefly commented on it in a retrospective on the Family Computer itself. While the author believes that the game isn't nearly as good as the original, adding that it was a disappointing release at the time, GAMP no Nazo wasn't as bad as its players made it out to be, writing that the puzzle-solving mechanic made it stand out from other, similar vertical shooters from the era. Retro Gamer's Stuart Campbell, who covered it in a 2007 retrospective on the Xevious franchise, noted of the game's drastic changes in pace from its predecessor. While Campbell liked the new level themes and expansion on the core gameplay, he was critical of its overly-high difficulty and complicated mechanics. Campbell wrote: "It's a bizarre game, complicated and confusing and mercilessly hard even before it starts pulling mean tricks like hiding enemy fighters underneath clouds. With no continues you'll need an awful lot of persistence if you're ever gonna solve the riddle of what the heck's going on in GAMP No Nazo". In 2014, Carlo Savorelli of Hardcore Gaming 101 enjoyed the game's power-up system and cinematic approach, particularly the tunnel level where the player flies slightly above the ground and has to avoid enemies.

== Legacy ==
The commercial and critical failure of Super Xevious: GAMP no Nazo prompted Namco to rethink the direction that the Xevious series was taking. Future sequels to the original, such as Xevious: Fardraut Saga (1988) and Xevious 3D/G (1996), ignored many concepts established in GAMP no Nazo and chose to stick to the formula established in the first game. GAMP no Nazo was the first Xevious title to have GAMP as a character in-game, as previously he had only appeared by name in promotional material; GAMP has appeared in most Xevious sequels since.

The game appears as the name of a fictional sponsor in the 2004 PlayStation Portable game Ridge Racers. A battery charger designed after the cover art for the game was released in Japan in 2019. In 2016, Japanese company Dream Factory published Xevious: GAMP no Nazo wa Subete Hodoketa!? for iOS devices. It is a Xevious game created for Bandai Namco Entertainment's "Catalog IP Project" program, which allowed developers to use Namco video games for their own projects. Despite the similar mechanics and title, the developer of the game said to Famitsu that there is no connection between Subete Hodokete and GAMP no Nazo.
