= Xevious: Fardraut Saga =

1988 video game

- MSX2 version cover art
- Developer: Compile
- Publisher: Namco
- Series: Xevious
- Platforms: MSX2, PC Engine
- Release: JP: December 23, 1988
- Genre: Scrolling shooter
- Mode: Single-player

Xevious: Fardraut Saga (Note: Japanese: ゼビウス ファードラウト伝説(サーガ), Hepburn: Zebiusu Fādorauto Sāga) is a 1988 vertically scrolling shooter video game published by Namco for the MSX2 in Japan. An updated PC Engine version was released two years later. The fifth entry in the Xevious franchise, the player controls a spaceship in its mission to vanquish the Xevious forces before its supercomputer leader GAMP wipes out the entirety of mankind. The player uses two weapons, an air zapper to destroy air-based enemies, and a blaster bomb to destroy ground-based enemies.

Fardraut Saga was part of Namco's attempt to bring the Xevious series back into popularity, after games such as Gradius began winning over players in arcades. Their previous attempt, Super Xevious: GAMP no Nazo, was widely-disliked by fans and a commercial flop. Instead of being produced in-house, Namco enlisted the help of Japanese studio Compile, known for creating the Puyo Puyo, Zanac, and Aleste series, to develop it. Production was led by Compile founder Masamitsu "Moo" Mitani. The MSX2 was chosen as the platform to produce the game on due to Compile having previously developed many games for it.

Fardraut Saga received mixed reviews. Critics focused primarily on the game's high difficulty and average graphics, along with it lacking replay value and having poor music and sound effects. The inclusion of the original Xevious and its new gameplay mechanics had received praise. It was followed by the 3D spin-off Solvalou in arcades in 1991.

== Gameplay ==
Screenshot of the PC Engine version.

In the MSX2 version, players can select between two modes at the title screen: "Recon", a port of the original Xevious; and "Scramble", which is a new 16-area game with new enemies, new boss battles as well as the Andor Genesis, and three new ships along with the original Solvalou; Solgrado, Zeodalley, and Gampmission; the latter of which is a combined variation of the three other ships that has increased firepower. The two modes are renamed to "Arcade" and "Fardraut" in the PC Engine version. However, Fardraut is a bit different from the original Scramble: it is a 4-stage game with new enemies and a different ship on each level. At the end of each level, players are greeted with a boss battle at the end of each level. Before each level players will be given a dialogue of the story that is given in the game.

== Development and release ==
The arcade game Xevious, developed by Namco and released in 1983, received widespread acclaim from players and critics for its genre-defining gameplay mechanics and mysterious, cohesive world. It became a platinum seller on the Nintendo Family Computer, selling over one million copies and jumping console sales by a near two-million units. By the mid-1980s the game's popularity had significantly died down, as titles like Gradius began to win over players with their larger scope and longetivity. Despite opposition of Masanobu Endo, the creator of the original, Namco decided to create a sequel to Xevious for the Famicom as a way to bring the game back into popularity. It received mixed reviews, was widely-disliked by fans for its radical departure from the original, and was commercially unsuccessful.

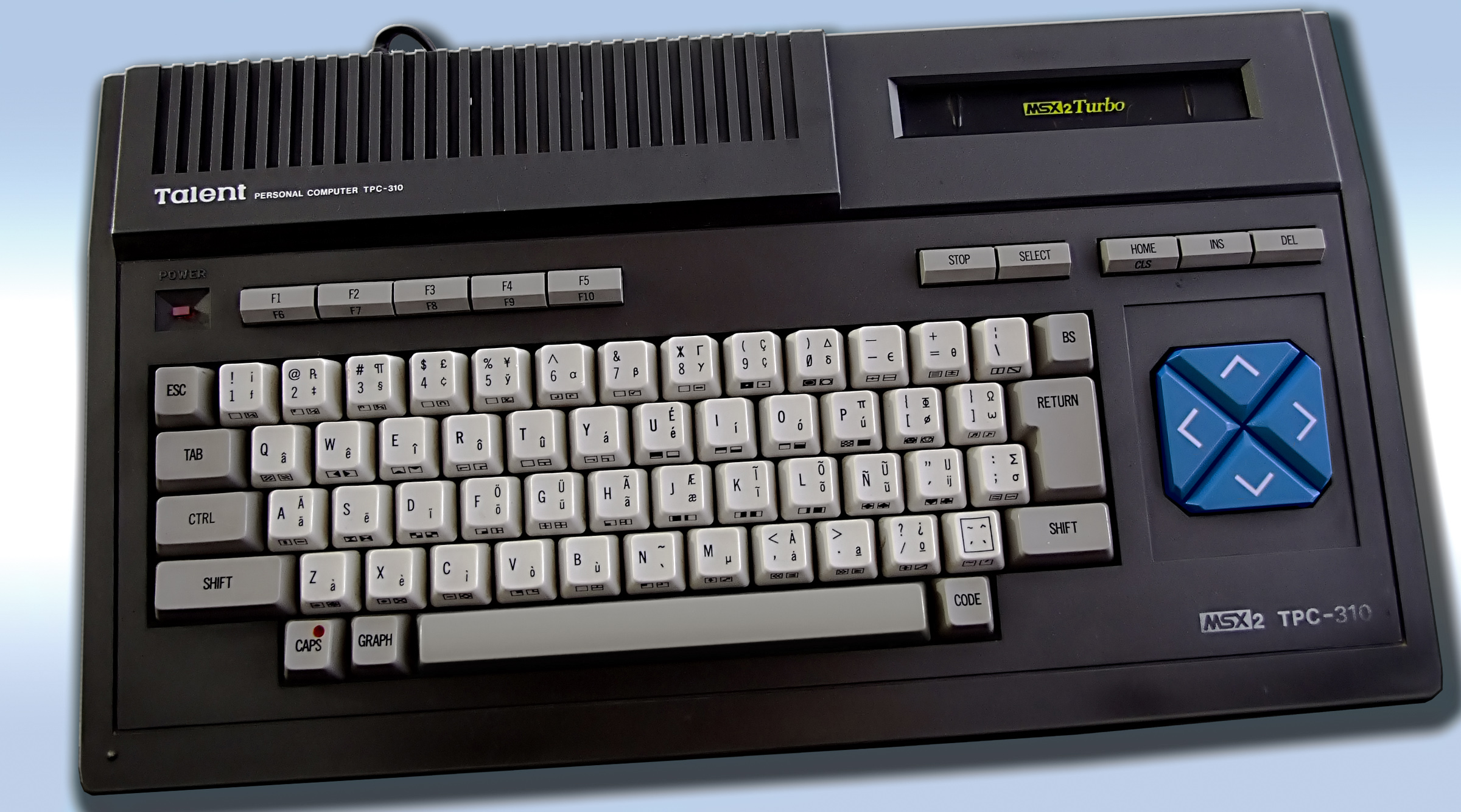
Fardraut Saga was produced for the MSX2 due to Compile being familiar with the hardware of the computer.

For their next attempt at reviving the series, Namco decided to produce a sequel that closely followed the original while still building on its core mechanics. Rather than producing the game entirely in-house, Namco enlisted the help of Compile, a Japanese studio known for series such as Puyo Puyo, Aleste, and Zanac, but they are not specifically credited in the game itself. Compile previously worked with Namco on the Nintendo Entertainment System (NES) version of Nihon Falcom's Legacy of the Wizard, which Namco published in Japan and Compile assisted in production of it. Production was led by Masamitsu "Moo" Niitani, the founder of Compile and a designer for Zanac. Fardraut Saga was designed for the MSX2 computer, as Compile had previously developed many games for it and as such had a clear grasp on its hardware. Some of the game's enemies were named by Moo after Compile's own employees and previous titles, including one named after himself. The game's box art, featuring 3D computer-generated models of the Solvalou and Andor Genesis, were taken from a CGI short film that Namco produced in 1988. Namco published Fardraut Saga on December 23, 1988 in Japan.

=== Fardraut Densetsu ===
On June 29, 1990, a PC Engine version of Fardraut Saga was published, sometimes referred to as Xevious: Fardraut Densetsu to distinguish itself from the MSX2 version. Compile previously teased the game in the ending for the MSX release, originally subtitled Episode 2: Final Weapon. Rather than simply being a remake of the MSX2 game, the PC Engine version boasts several new additions, such as a new four-level campaign and different power-up items. It is believed that the game is heavily-based on Fardraut, a novel written by Masanobu Endo himself that documents the world of Xevious and the story behind it.

== Reception ==
Reception

Review scores
Publication	Score
Famitsu	29/40
Power Play	51/100

Reviewers were mixed on the game's visuals and sound effects. Power Play magazine found them to be mediocre, which Play Time and Famitsu agreed upon. Play Time also found the sound effects to be "tinny" and annoying to listen to. Famitsu said that the graphics sometimes made enemy bullets difficult to see, leading in the death of the player. PC-Engine Fan disagreed, finding them to be rich and colorful. Critics welcomed the new soundtrack - Power Play liked its catchyness and Famitsu liked the overall inclusion of such as opposed to simply reusing tracks from the first game. PC-Engine Fan had a similar response, liking it for being pumping and catchy. In a retrospective review, Hardcore Gaming 101 applauded the game's visuals for being superior to the original, while also saying its music was much more "dramatic" compared to the first game.

Critics felt indifferent on the gameplay itself, with several finding it to lack replay value and to be too difficult. Both Famitsu and Power Play said that the game lacked replay value, with Famitsu claiming the package itself was incomplete with very few features. They also disliked the new mode for being too short and hard to play. While Play Time stated that the original felt dated in comparison to other shooters in the market, Famitsu disagreed, praising its faithfulness to the arcade version and for keeping the same level of difficulty and secrets. PC-Engine Fan was much more positive towards the game, saying that the addition of power-ups and new ship types, alongside its new gameplay mode and boss fights, made it a successful update to the original Xevious. Retrospectively, Retro Gamer magazine disagreed with the game lacking replay value, saying that its new game mode and options made it a worthwhile entry in the series. They also liked its unique gameplay ideas and for being welcoming to newcomers, calling it an "exhausting, exciting game".
