= Family Circuit =

1988 video game

- Developer: Game Studio
- Publisher: Namco
- Producer: Kazuo Imanari
- Designer: Masanobu Endo
- Programmer: Hazure Moroboshi
- Artist: Masanobu Endo
- Composer: Nobuyuki Ohnogi
- Platform: Family Computer
- Release: JP: January 6, 1988
- Genre: Racing
- Mode: Single player

Family Circuit (Note: Japanese: ファミリーサーキット, Hepburn: Famirī Sākitto) is a 1988 top-down racing video game developed by Game Studio and published by Namco for the Family Computer. The game was designed by Masanobu Endō, who previously developed Xevious and The Tower of Druaga, and his company Game Studio.

A sequel titled Family Circuit '91 was released for the Family Computer in 1991.

Super Family Circuit was released for the Super Famicom on October 21, 1994.

== Reception ==
Reception

Review scores
Publication	Score
Famitsu	32/40
Family Computer Magazine	19.27/30

Award
Publication	Award
Famitsu	Gold Hall of Fame

The game topped the bi-weekly Japanese Famitsu sales chart in February 1988.
