= Namco Museum Essentials =

2009 video game

- PlayStation 3 cover art
- Developer: Cattle Call (Note: Emulation by Gotch Technology)
- Publisher: Namco Bandai Games (Note: Released under the Namco label outside North America)
- Series: Namco Museum
- Platform: PlayStation 3
- Release: JP: January 29, 2009; NA: July 16, 2009; PAL: April 1, 2010
- Genre: Various
- Modes: Single-player, multiplayer

Namco Museum Essentials (Note: Known in Japan as Namco Museum.comm (ナムコミュージアム.comm, Namuko Myūjiamu.comm)) is a 2009 video game compilation developed by Cattle Call and published by Namco Bandai Games for the PlayStation 3. The collection includes five Namco arcade games from the 1980s: Pac-Man (1980), Galaga (1981), Dig Dug (1982), Xevious (1983), and Dragon Spirit (1987), alongside an exclusive Xevious sequel, Xevious Resurrection. Player progress is rewarded with stamps, which could be redeemed for virtual items in the now-defunct PlayStation Home service. Stamps also award points when collected, used to unlock extra features such as wallpapers.

The ".comm" in the game's Japanese title is thought to stand for "community", based on the game's online functionality. To help promote the game, Namco Bandai set up a custom PlayStation Home hub space featuring a demo of the game. Upon release, Namco Museum Essentials was met with a mixed reception from critics; although it was criticized for its small game library and lack of multiplayer in most of the games, reviewers praised the emulation quality, unlockable extras and presentation. It was removed from the PlayStation Store on March 15, 2018.

== Games ==
PlayStation 3 version screenshot

Namco Museum Essentials consists of six games - five of these are Namco arcade games from the 1980s, while the sixth, Xevious Resurrection, is exclusive to this collection. The arcade games allow the player to start on any stage the player had previously been to, as well as featuring a score attack mode where the player is to gain as many points possible before dying. In-game options allow the player to change the number of lives and border artwork. Multiplayer is excluded from each game, with the exception of Xevious Resurrection.

By completing certain objectives in each of the games, players are rewarded with stamps that were redeemable for items in the now-defunct PlayStation Home service, such as shirts, hats and arcade cabinets; the game includes over 50 unlockable items. Stamps also award points when unlocked, which can increase a player's account level; reaching new levels can also unlock items such as wallpapers. Online leaderboards are also present, allowing players to view scores from other users around the world as well as from friends. Players also have access to a sound test and the ability to record a friend's progress.

=== Xevious Resurrection ===
In-game screenshot

Xevious Resurrection is a vertical-scrolling shooter video game, serving as a modern update of the original Xevious arcade game. Up to two players control their respective Solvalou starships — white for player one and black for player two — and must wipe out the Xevious forces and their supercomputer leader GAMP before they take over Earth. The Solvalou have two weapons at their disposal: an "air zapper" that can destroy flying enemies, and a "blaster bomb" that can destroy ground-stationed enemies. New to this game is a shield system that the Solvalou can use to protect themselves from enemy projectiles for a short period of time. Using the shield depletes a potion of the "shield meter" at the sides of the screen, which can be refilled by collected orange triangular-shaped pickups dropped by certain enemies.

The game is composed of several stages, referred in-game as "areas", consisting of outer space, forests, deserts featuring the Nazca lines from Peru, and mechanical bases, similar to Solvalou and Xevious 3D/G. Some areas feature bosses that the player must defeat in order to progress, one being a rematch with the Andor Genesis mothership from the first Xevious game. Bombing pre-determined spots on the ground in some areas can reveal Sol towers, which can be destroyed for extra points, and Rally-X Special Flags that will award the player an extra life when collected. Players can earn stamps by completing certain in-game objectives, unlocking special items for their PlayStation Home digital apartment.

== Development ==
Namco Museum Essentials was published by Namco Bandai Games for the PlayStation 3. Development was outsourced to Cattle Call, and titled Namco Museum.comm for its Japanese release - the ".comm" believed to mean "community", in reference to the game's online services. To help promote the game, Namco Bandai created a custom PlayStation Home hub area, which was also used to promote their other digital-only games - players could unlock additional items for their PlayStation Home upon visiting the space and could also play a demo of Essentials, which was titled Namco Museum BETA (Note: Namco Museum BETA (ナムコミュージアムBETA, Namuko Myūjiamu Bēta)) in Japan. The game was one of the earliest titles to utilize PlayStation Home's rewards system. Xevious Resurrection was created to remake the core Xevious gameplay for a modern shoot'em up audience. Essentials was released in Japan on January 29, 2009, in North America on July 16, 2009, and in Europe on April 1, 2010. The game was pulled from the PlayStation Store on March 15, 2018.

== Reception ==
Reception

Aggregate score
Aggregator	Score
Metacritic	64/100

Review scores
Publication	Score
GamePro	3.5/5
IGN	7.5/10
Play	60%
Push Square	7/10

Upon release, Namco Museum Essentials was met with mixed reviews from critics. Although criticism was drawn towards the small game library and lack of online multiplayer, praise was given to the game's presentation, emulation quality and unlockable extras. It holds a 64 out of 100 on Metacritic.

In their review, IGN called the overall presentation "top-notch", praising the game's use of PlayStation Home and bonus content, which they noted added replay value to the games. Push Square stated that the unlockable extras and leaderboards "brings the classics into the 21st-century", as well as praising the emulation quality. GamePro complemented the addition of the stamp system, claiming that it gave the game more depth.

Despite this, reviewers were critical of the small game library and lack of multiplayer. GamePro criticized the game library for being too small and lacking any updated visuals or features, as well as criticizing the lack of multiplayer and "unnecessarily large" file size. Similarly, IGN expressed disappointment that multiplayer was excluded from the games except Xevious Resurrection, as well as being critical of the small game library. Although GamePro disliked the game's price point, advising readers to "choose wisely" before purchasing, Push Square contested this, saying that it was "worth the chance" to fans of Namco's game catalog. In a retrospective review of Xevious Resurrection, Sam Derboo of Hardcore Gaming 101 said the game's graphics were "very effective" for their budget, noting how the backgrounds resembled satellite photographs.
