= The Quest of Ki =

1988 video game

- Developer: Game Studio
- Publisher: Namco
- Director: Masanobu Endo
- Artist: Yuichiro Shinozaki
- Writer: Masanobu Endo
- Composer: Junko Ozawa
- Series: Babylonian Castle Saga
- Platforms: Family Computer, Arcade
- Release: JP: July 22, 1988; Arcade: JP: 1988
- Genre: Platform
- Mode: Single-player
- Arcade system: Nintendo VS. System

The Quest of Ki (Note: Japanese: カイの冒険, Hepburn: Kai no Bōken) is a 1988 platform video game developed by Game Studio and published by Namco for the Family Computer. Only released in Japan, it is the third game in Babylonian Castle Saga series which started with the 1984 arcade game, The Tower of Druaga. An arcade port for the Nintendo VS. System titled VS. The Quest of Ki was released in 1988.

== Plot ==
The story acts as a prequel to The Tower of Druaga. It occurs shortly after the demon Druaga has stolen the Blue Crystal Rod and taken to a tower originally built by the Sumer Empire, in which the god Anu had destroyed. The goddess Ishtar gives the priestess Ki a golden tiara that enables the power of flight, and sends her to the tower in order to retrieve The Blue Crystal Rod. The game then follows her doomed quest to the top of the tower, with help from the dragon Quox. Upon reaching the 60th floor, Ki reaches the Blue Crystal Rod, but Druaga splits the rod into three pieces and transforms Ki into stone, leading up to the events of The Tower of Druaga.

== Gameplay ==
The game is a side-scrolling platformer with one hundred levels. In each level, the player's goal is to pick up a key and open the door leading to the next area. Various enemies, including slimes, ghosts, and wizards, appear on each floor, and any contact with them results in death.

Ki has no weapons, and thus can not damage or defeat any of the enemies. Her only abilities are to dash and jump. As long as the player holds the jump button down, Ki can rise indefinitely into the air, but a contact with the ceiling or dashing against a wall will cause her to drop to the ground and become stunned for several seconds. This mechanic of floating and getting stunned from bumping against the walls or ceiling is similar to the 1983 Atari vector arcade game, Major Havoc.

Many of the levels consist of puzzles in which the player must carefully regulate the height and direction of Ki's jumps. Each stage in the game contains one or more treasure chests, which hold various items. Although many of the items bestow helpful abilities, the effects only last for the floor on which they were found.

After completing the game, players can gain access to forty bonus stages. These stages contain cameos from the Pac-Man ghosts and the enemies from Dig Dug.

== Re-releases ==
The NES version was released as downloadable content in Namcot Collection for the Nintendo Switch in August 2020. Hamster Corporation released the arcade version as part of their Arcade Archives series for the Nintendo Switch and PlayStation 4 in November 2024.

== See also ==
- GameCenter CX, a Japanese TV program that used the game in one of challenges during the final episode of the 7th season and the first episode of the 8th season.
