= The Return of Ishtar =

1986 video game

- Sales flyer
- Developers: Game Studio; Namco
- Publisher: Namco
- Designer: Masanobu Endō
- Artist: Yūichirō Shinozaki
- Composers: Junko Ozawa; Yuzo Koshiro (MSX)
- Series: Babylonian Castle Saga
- Platforms: Arcade, FM-7, MSX, PC-88, PC-98, X68000
- Release: JP: July 1986
- Genres: Maze, action role-playing
- Mode: Multiplayer
- Arcade system: Namco System 86

The Return of Ishtar (Note: Japanese: イシターの復活, Hepburn: Ishitā no Fukkatsu) is a 1986 action role-playing video game developed by Game Studio and published by Namco for arcades. It was released only in Japan in July 1986. It is the sequel to The Tower of Druaga, which was released two years earlier. The game's story directly starts after the first game, where Ki and Gil must venture down in the Tower of Druaga and escape it. It is the second game in the company's Babylonian Castle Saga series, and was later ported to the MSX, NEC PC-8801, FM-7, and X68000.

== Gameplay ==
Screenshot

The Return of Ishtar is an adventure game that requires two players. It was also the first game from Namco to have a password feature, to give players the opportunity to continue from where they left off, and their first to not feature a scoring system. Player 1 controls the priestess Ki who fights with magic, while Player 2 controls the sword-wielding Prince Gilgamesh.

This sequel starts off directly after Gilgamesh has saved Ki from Druaga, and focuses on their escape from the tower (and its inhabitants, who are after Gilgamesh and Ki to avenge their former master). There are a total of 128 rooms in the sixty-floor tower, and the screen will only scroll according to Ki's location, so the second player will have to stay close to their partner as they traverse the tower. Ki attacks by casting spells at the enemies, while Gilgamesh automatically draws his sword whenever an enemy gets close enough to him, allowing him to attack the enemy by bumping into it with his blade (similar to Adol from the Ys games). However, colliding with enemies will also damage Gilgamesh, and the counter in the bottom-right of the screen will decrease by a preset amount, depending on what enemy type it was. If the counter reaches 0, he will disappear, and the game will be over for both players (which will also happen if Ki is touched by any enemy at all). There are also several different items that can be found in the rooms and collected to aid Gilgamesh and Ki in their quest. As an easter egg, the game's designer, Masanobu Endō, appears unconscious at his desk in the "Dead End" room. Ki can use the Blue Crystal Rod spell on him to wake him up; he will then proceed to warp her and Gilgamesh to the "Calvary Prison" room.

== Reception ==
In Japan, Game Machine listed The Return of Ishtar on their August 15, 1986 issue as being the sixteenth most-popular arcade game at the time.

Reviewing Namco Museum Volume 4, Jeff Gerstmann of GameSpot described The Return of Ishtar as weird and boring. Electronic Gaming Monthly's Shawn Smith said it and The Genji and Heike Clans were bad games due to their difficult controls and not being fun.

== Legacy ==
The Return of Ishtar was included in the compilation game Namco Museum Volume 4 for the PlayStation, which is also the first time the game had been released overseas.

A theme based on the game is featured in Pac-Man 99, as one of the game's DLC. The main theme of the game received a remix in Namco × Capcom.

The game was released for the Wii's Virtual Console in Japan. Hamster Corporation released the game as part of their Arcade Archives series for the Nintendo Switch and PlayStation 4 in September 2022.
