= Prop Cycle =

1996 video game

- Developer: Namco
- Publisher: Namco
- Designer: Shigeki Toyama
- Programmer: Naoyuki Koyama
- Composer: Etsuo Ishii
- Platform: Arcade
- Release: JP: June 1996; NA: July 1996
- Genre: Racing
- Mode: Single-player
- Arcade system: Namco Super System 22

Prop Cycle (Note: Japanese: プロップサイクル, Hepburn: Puroppu Saikuru) is a 1996 arcade game developed and published by Namco.

== Gameplay ==
Prop Cycle is a 3D flying simulator in which the player controls a human-powered aircraft to pop hot-air balloons in the city of Solitar to prevent the city from floating away permanently. The cycle is controlled by using pedals to spin the propeller and handlebars to steer left and right and change altitude.

== Plot ==
The story takes place in a world destroyed by a war 200 years earlier. A hyperspace magnetic weapon called the "Tesla Bomb" was used in the war, destroying all civilization and completely changing the world's terrain. The few who survived have abandoned high technology and live a simple but elegant life. The most advanced technology is the steam engine powered by a natural resource called fuel stones. Using improved steam engines with fuel stones, it is possible to fly an airplane. With the world's terrain made up of steep canyons caused by the destruction from the previous war, personal flight technology is necessary for people to live without destroying nature. However flight technology has undergone a high degree of evolution with the new civilization's collection of knowledge and now it is possible to fly freely with only human power. The flying machine is called the "Lapperopter".

After somebody inadvertently activates a piece of old technology hidden within a shrine, pieces of the protagonist's hometown are ripped from the earth and sent flying into the sky. The resulting floating islands are referred to as 'Solitar', and it is theorised that as long as the machine is active the islands will continue to rise, endangering the trapped townspeople. While efforts are made to deactivate whatever machine is keeping the islands afloat, none are successful.

Eventually, a letter from Solitar is received that explains the nature of the mechanism; the machine is powered by balls of energy floating among the islands. It is theorised that a Lapperopter pilot of sufficient skill could travel to Solitar and destroy these energy balls, which would deactivate the machine and save Solitar's citizens. Therefore, a test is devised; the protagonist is tasked with flying his Lapperopter around the town's airspace, popping balloons imitating the Solitar machine's energy balls. If the protagonist is able to pass three routes, he will be allowed a single chance to travel to Solitar and attempt to disable the machine.

If successful, the machine is destroyed and the islands of Solitar fall back to earth in the same place they originally occupied; the protagonist is hailed as a hero by the townspeople.

== Development and release ==
Prop Cycle was designed by Shigeki Toyama, an engineer for Namco that worked on games such as Xevious (1983), Final Lap (1987), and Point Blank (1994). Toyama was inspired to create Prop Cycle after he and another Namco employee finished production on a technical demo where the player rode in a human-powered plane and shot down enemies. The demo didn't use 3D polygons, but instead 2D sprites with scaling techniques that created the illusion of a 3D world. While Toyama didn't find the game itself interesting, he thought its sense of flight was intriguing and decided to turn the concept into a full game. He was also inspired by the Studio Ghibli film Kiki's Delivery Service, which stars a young witch flying on a broomstick.

Since Prop Cycle was being made as an arcade game, Toyama wanted the game to be highly interactive and have a reason to be exclusive to arcades. He also wanted the game to be unique and distinct from other arcade games, as he never enjoyed repeating already-existing ideas. Toyama worked to allow players to experience the thrill of flying and feeling the wind, and to make the game itself be more than simply defeating enemies. To get an idea of what Toyama was looking for, the development team went out for a day of hang gliding with a camera attached to the glider's wings. The team spent three to four months developing the flying aspect; programmer Naoyuki Koyama didn't understand what Toyama wanted to convey with "riding the wind", so to demonstrate he attached a weight to an umbrella to give Koyama an idea of what he was trying to create.

Toyama wanted Prop Cycle to have a proper storyline in addition to its unique game concept. Jokingly referring to his role as the project's "movie director", Toyama designed the setting, plotline, and characters, and drew the artwork for the villages and level themes. An intentional design choice was that the player had to make it to the last stage in order to understand the story, a decision he has since come to regret. Toyama considered making a "Sightseeing" mode where players were able to fly anywhere they wanted under a time limit, however the limited development time caused the idea to be scrapped.

== Reception ==
Reception

Review score
Publication	Score
Next Generation	4/5

Game Machine claims that Prop Cycle was the second most popular arcade game of August 1996 in Japan. Next Generation stated that "in the final analysis, Prop Cycle's strengths win out over its weaknesses." Retro Gamer described it as being one of the most unique arcade games ever created, and a more accessible title compared to Namco and Sega's other offerings. Staff enjoyed the game's simplicity and originality, writing that there is "no question as to how it has stayed in so many locations after almost two decades."
