= Grobda =

1984 video game

- Japanese arcade flyer
- Developer: Namco
- Publishers: JP: Namco; NA: Magic Electronics
- Designer: Masanobu Endō
- Series: Xevious
- Platforms: Arcade, PC-6001, PC-8801, Sharp MZ, Sharp X1
- Release: Arcade: JP: August 1984; NA: September 1985; PC-8801: JP: 1985
- Genre: Multidirectional shooter
- Modes: Single-player, multiplayer

Grobda (Note: Japanese: グロブダー, Hepburn: Gurobudā) is a 1984 multidirectional shooter video game developed and published by Namco for arcades. It was released in Japan in August 1984 and in North America in September 1985 by Magic Electronics. It is a spin-off from Xevious, as the player's tank first appeared in that game as an enemy.

== Gameplay ==
The player avoiding collision from enemy projectiles.

Grobda is a multidirectional shooter similar to the 1977 Atari 2600 game Combat. The plot involves humans using powerful, laser-emitting vehicles in a dangerous competitive sport known as "battling", thousands of years in the future. In the game, the player assumes control of the Grobda, a screw-propelled tank capable of firing laser beams at enemies. The objective of each level, known in-game as "battlings", is to destroy all of the enemies while dodging their projectiles as quickly as possible. There are 99 levels total, each becoming progressively more difficult.

Grobda's laser weapon is capable of destroying most enemies in one hit, although some carry shields that require additional shots to destroy. When an enemy is destroyed, it causes an explosion that will destroy any other enemies in its blast radius, including Grobda. The remains of the enemy are left in its place, which cause the Grobda to slow down if they move over them. Grobda has its own shield that briefly protects them from enemy fire, indicated by the meter at the bottom of the screen. The shield disappears if it is inflicted with enough damage, and does not refill until the next round.

== Development ==
The eponymous Grobda was originally an enemy in Xevious (1983), where it evaded the player's air-to-surface bombs.

Grobda was designed by Masanobu Endo and a small team of developers within Namco. Endo is best known as the creator of Xevious (1983) and The Tower of Druaga (1984), two widely-successful arcade games from the 1980s; most of the developers behind Grobda had worked on both titles. The Grobda was originally a defenseless enemy in Xevious that attempted to evade the player's air-to-surface bombs. Endo believed that the idea of giving Grobda powerful weapons and attacks was a humorous idea, and made for an interesting game concept. The game was planned and completed in three months, one of the shortest development times for a Namco game, and was developed on a small budget. The soundtrack was composed by Yuriko Keino, known for her work on games such as Dig Dug (1982). She envisioned the tempo for the background humming to become faster as the Grobda moved faster around the playfield. The current-sound hardware was unable to accomplish this, so Keino wrote a custom program that enabled it.

== Release ==
Grobda was published in December 1984, running on the Namco Super Pac-Man arcade system board. In promotional material, Namco used the tagline "Grobda has awakened its combat instinct". The game was distributed in North America by Magic Electronics in September 1985. Grobda was ported to the PC-8801 home computer in Japan the same year, developed by Dempa Software. Grobda has been included in multiple Namco Museum collections such as Namco Museum Vol. 2 (1996), Namco Museum Battle Collection (2005), Namco Museum Virtual Arcade (2008), and Namco Museum Megamix (2010). The latter also includes a minigame based on Grobda titled Grobda Remix, where players control Pac-Man as he must destroy as many enemies possible under a time limit. Grobda was added to the Wii's Virtual Console in Japan on November 16, 2009, alongside dozens of other Namco arcade games. Hamster Corporation released the game as part of their Arcade Archives series for the Nintendo Switch and PlayStation 4 in February 2023.

== Reception and legacy ==
Reception

Review score
Publication	Score
AllGame	3.5/5

According to the arcade game magazine Game Machine, Grobda was Japan's top-grossing arcade game of December 1984 by revenue. In 1998, AllGame labeled Grobda as "a refreshing departure from slower, more methodical tank shooters such as Combat and Armor Ambush", praising its fast-paced gameplay but criticizing its high difficulty. In a 2014 retrospective review, Hardcore Gaming 101 said that the game was a lot simpler in gameplay compared to Xevious, and felt mixed towards the game's difficulty level. According to former Wolf Team designer Kazuyoshi Inoue, Grobda was an influence for Granada alongside Assault, as co-designer Toshio Toyota was a fan of arcade games.
