= The Nightmare of Druaga =

2004 video game

The Nightmare of Druaga: Fushigi no Dungeon
- Developer: Arika (Note: Co-produced by Arika, Matrix Software, and Chunsoft.)
- Publishers: JP: Arika; NA: Namco Hometek
- Producers: Ichiro Mihara; Yasuhiro Ohori
- Artist: Takeshi Okazaki
- Writers: Ichiro Tezuka; Ichiro Mihara; Osamu Yanase
- Composers: Masashi Yano; Ayako Sasō; Shinji Hosoe; Takayuki Aihara
- Series: Babylonian Castle Saga; Mystery Dungeon
- Platform: PlayStation 2
- Release: JP: July 29, 2004; NA: October 27, 2004
- Genre: Role-playing
- Mode: Single-player

The Nightmare of Druaga: Fushigi no Dungeon (Note: Japanese: ザ・ナイトメア・オブ・ドルアーガ 不思議のダンジョン; The Nightmare of Druaga: Mystery Dungeon) is a roguelike dungeon crawler video game developed by Arika and published in 2004 in Japan by Arika (under license from Namco) and in North America by Namco Hometek exclusively for the PlayStation 2. It is a sequel to The Tower of Druaga and the eighth game in Chunsoft's Mystery Dungeon series.

Set in a fictionalized version of ancient Babylon, the story follows Gilgamesh (shortened to Gil) in his journey to save his fiancée Ki from the evil sorceress Skulld. The story is told primarily through real-time cut scenes.

== Gameplay ==
Gil battles a Roper in Druaga's Tower near the end of the game.

The Nightmare of Druaga: Fushigi no Dungeon consists primarily of two types of gameplay: town sections and dungeon sections. Town sections are free-roaming areas where the player can purchase items, upgrade equipment, and accept side-quests, as well as talk with townsfolk. Townsfolk will offer helpful information and some residents transport Gil to side-dungeons. The plot is generally advanced by defeating the bosses at the end of each of the dungeons under Ishtar's temple. Dungeon sections consist of turn-based play within the grid-based levels, in which enemies move or attack only when the player moves or attacks. Dungeons appear as a variety of areas, including caves, temples, forests, and sewers. While in the dungeons the player's vision is limited by the light generated by Gil's armor; to maintain Gil's brightness the player must occasionally give items as offerings to Ishtar. These dungeons contain randomly generated items and monsters, and advancement initially requires the player to find a key on each floor and bring it to the exit. Subsequent visits to the floor allow the character to break down the locked door at the end, leading to a secret level with rare items and tough foes. Much like The Tower of Druaga, the game contains some foes which are far too powerful for the player to fight initially and they must instead be avoided.

Weapons and armor change Gil's speed relative to the foes within the dungeon as well as altering the range of his attacks, lending a sense of strategy to equipment choices. Rare magic items can be found which allow Gil to cast powerful area-of-effect spells, and items can be imbued with elements which allow Gil to deal extra damage to vulnerable foes. Gil can also combine items while in town, creating a new item of the same type which shares the properties of both.

The game is known for its relatively unforgiving difficulty, as death in the game results in the loss of nearly all items and half the player's gold, though a small amount of items can be specially marked in Ishtar's temple so that they remain with the player upon death. A special auto-save feature prevents players from resetting to avoid these penalties by auto-saving before any scene transition, thereby recognizing if the game is deactivated without saving manually. Doing so results in a lengthy discussion with Ishtar before the player is allowed to resume their game.

== Plot ==
The game begins with a prologue detailing Gil and Ki's war against the demon, Druaga, which took place during the first four games of the Druaga series. Three years later, Ki and Gil are set to be married as Gil is to be crowned king of Babylon. The evening before the ceremony, Ki is captured by an evil sorceress, Skulld, who takes her back to the Tower of Druaga. Gil enters the portal shrine under Ishtar's temple to save her.

Gil, as he appears for the official art for this game. His gold armor was blessed by Ishtar.

Fighting his way through the formerly sealed tower, Gil encounters the Shrine Mother, Callindra, who Gil returns to Ishtar's temple instead of leaving her to save Ki. Gil confidently states Ishtar and Anu's blessings will protect him, but Callindra informs Gil that the protection seems to be weakening. Gil returns to the dungeon to save Ki, regardless.

Venturing deeper and deeper into the dungeon, Gil finds Skulld and Ki on the bottom level of the dark ruins. Skulld refuses to free Ki, explaining that Druaga didn't kill Ki when he captured her because she attracts powerful monsters. A giant slime approaches and Gil is forced to kill it to protect Ki. After the battle, Skulld imprisons Ki with the Chronos Orbs, a barrier Gil cannot destroy. Skulld then knocks Gil out and transports him back into the temple.

While Gil prepares to try to rescue Ki, Callindra explains the Chronos Orbs. Gil resolves to destroy the orbs to save Ki.

Gil locates the orbs at the bottom of an ancient cavern, and destroys them. He then comes across Skulld, whose power has been drained, but Skulld has already released Ki from her crystal prison. Ki informs Gil that she has something to do and disappears, leaving only her tiara behind. Skulld laments her own fate as she fades, and expresses regret that she could not be with Gil. Confused, but determined to find Ki, Gil returns to the shrine.

Callindra explains that Ki may be on a mission for Ishtar. She recommends that Gil speak with Ishtar deep within a holy sanctuary. Inside the sanctuary, Ki's tiara glows intermittently, granting Gil visions of what appear to be Ki by herself. In one particularly horrific scene, bodies are shown to be strewn across the streets of Babylim. Ki herself appears to be in distress, thinking she has killed Gil. At the sanctuary, Ki is shown speaking to Ishtar about what she can do to save Gil. Ishtar explains to Ki how to transcend time.

At the deepest point of the sanctuary, Gil meets Ishtar. Ishtar reveals that Babylim was in fact destroyed when Gil brought down the Blue Crystal Rod from the Tower of Druaga. The Blue Crystal Rod was in reality the Dark Crystal Rod, which resonated with a seed planted in Ki's body. Although this seed had been repressed by Ishtar's providence, by agreeing to marry Gil, Ki was required to give up her position as a shrine maiden and with it, Ishtar's protection. The seed then awakened and killed everyone but Ki. Skulld, Ishtar reveals, is none other than Ki, who had transcended time with Ishtar's blessing. Although Skulld/Ki succeeded in saving Gil, this was by kidnapping Ki before her marriage to Gil. By preventing Ki from marrying Gil, Ki never loses Ishtar's protection and thus, the seed inside her is never unleashed. This, however, also means that Ki is herself trapped in a time loop in which she abducts her past self; transfers her knowledge of the seed to the imprisoned Ki; and is defeated by Gil. Thus Gil and Ki are trapped in Druaga's "nightmare". Ishtar informs Gil that the only way to break the loop is to return to from before Druaga's original defeat at Gil's hand, and there retrieve the true Blue Crystal Rod.

Gil returns to the Tower of Druaga and recovers two of the pieces of the Blue Crystal Rod. At the 57th floor of the tower he encounters Druaga's consort and chief lieutenant, Succubus, who offers him the Ruby Mace with which to kill Druaga. Gil discloses to Succubus that he has seen through her plan, and insists that she relinquish the third piece of the Blue Crystal Rod. Succubus, realizing that Ishtar can interfere with her plans even from across time, is taken aback. Gil defeats her and assembles the true form of the Blue Crystal Rod.

On the 59th floor, Gil confronts Druaga. Upon seeing the Blue Crystal Rod, Druaga realizes that Gil has defeated Succubus. Druaga explains that he had intended to fool Gil by allowing Gil to slay him, only to be resurrected when the seed in Ki awakened. More powerful than ever, Druaga could have invaded even heaven itself. Druaga resolves to defeat Gil and to destroy the "hateful" Blue Crystal Rod.

Gil bests Druaga, but is interrupted by Succubus. Succubus melds with Druaga into a new form, "Ultimate Druaga". Gil defeats them both—for the final time—and frees Ki from her crystal prison.

Gil marries Ki without incident, but soon turns restless. He has determined that humans should create their own happiness without the gods' help, and resolves to return the Blue Crystal Rod to Anu, atop the Tower Between Heaven and Earth.

At level 20 of between heaven and earth, the dungeon Gil goes through to return the crystal rod to Anu, he defeats a giant slime boss reminiscent of the dark ruins, at level 40 destroys another set of chronos orbs ala caverns. At level 60 Gil must defeat 4 guardian dragons (Quox being one of them) before proceeding to level 80 where he once again bests Succubus. After level 80 all enemies are golden in appearance and namesake. At level 100 beats Druaga again and who like Succubus is annoyed at being referred to as a demon. At level 108 Gil meets (peacefully) with Ishtar and it is revealed that the demons have been freed by Gil and now honorably protect the path to heaven. Ishtar gives her blessings to Gil and his cause. Finally, Gil meets with Anu and is given the choice to return the crystal rod or just visit. Gil returned the rod, to Anu's displeasure, it seemed, and he had little confidence in humankind's ability to manage themselves without the gods' involvement. To prove his determination Gil fights and defeats Ki (who fights like Succubus). Gil beforehand recites a poem to Anu and after being returned to town it is again scrolled.

== Reception ==
The Nightmare of Druaga received a mixed reception from reviewers. GameSpot called it a "dungeon hack of the most boring kind", noting poor graphics, plodding gameplay, and forgettable music. GameSpy praised the game's graphics, highlighting the "eerily beautiful interplay of light and shadow", but noted the game's punishing save system as a fault and called the penalty for death "totally crippling". EGM summed up the game by stating "Advances in game technology are usually referred to as 'improvements' for a reason" in reference to the game's retro elements. 1UP.com's Jeremy Parish praised the game's music and interface, stating that for those who enjoy roguelikes it's "easily one of the best", though fans of typical console RPGs are "going to be absolutely miserable". The game sold about 43,000 copies during its debut week in Japan, making it the fourth best-seller in the region at that time.
