= Xevious 3D/G =

1997 video game

- Japanese flyer
- Developer: Namco
- Publishers: Namco; PlayStation: NA: Namco Hometek; EU: Sony Computer Entertainment
- Composers: Arcade: Shinji Hosoe; Ayako Saso; PlayStation; Hiroto Sasaki
- Series: Xevious
- Platforms: Arcade, PlayStation
- Release: Arcade: JP: May 1996; NA: 1996; PlayStation: JP: March 28, 1997; NA: June 12, 1997; EU: August 1997
- Genre: Scrolling shooter
- Modes: Single-player, multiplayer
- Arcade system: Namco System 11

Xevious 3D/G (Note: Japanese: ゼビウス 3D/G, Hepburn: Zebiusu Surī Dī Jī) is a 1996 vertically scrolling shooter video game developed and published by Namco for arcades. The eighth entry in the Xevious series, it combines 2D-based gameplay with 3D gouraud-shaded polygon graphics. Players control the Solvalou starship in its mission to destroy a rogue supercomputer named GAMP and the Xevian Forces, using two basic weapon types: an air zapper to destroy air targets, and a blaster bomb to destroy ground targets. The game also features destructive power-ups, new bosses, and two player simultaneous play.

When shoot 'em ups saw a revival in the mid-1990s, Namco sought to capitalize on its success with a modernized 3D update to Xevious. One of the first games for its System 11 hardware, it has a techno-infused soundtrack, most of which was composed jointly by Ayako Saso and Shinji Hosoe. The hardware allows the game to have a world much closer to the one established in previous games, with settings such as large, Aztec-inspired structures and deserts being pulled from pieces of conceptual artwork for the original.

Xevious 3D/G was criticized by fans for drastic departures that interrupted the core mechanics, and straying too far from what they felt made the game so popular in its heyday. A PlayStation conversion, titled Xevious 3D/G+, was released a year later and compiled 3D/G with the original Xevious, Super Xevious, and Xevious Arrangement onto one disc. This version received criticism from reviewers for its short length and low difficulty, but praise for its gameplay, techno soundtrack, graphics, and for building on mechanics established in previous games.

== Gameplay ==
Arcade screenshot

Xevious 3D/G is a vertically scrolling shooter which replaces the sprite-based format of the original with a polygonal environment. Up to two players control their respective Solvalou starships (blue for player one and red for player two) that must destroy the Xevious forces and their leader before they enslave all of mankind. The Solvalou has two weapons: a projectile that can destroy air-based enemies, and a bomb that can destroy ground-stationed enemies. New to this game are power-up items, found in cylindrical stations called "Poladomes" on the ground that must be bombed to acquire them. These include a blue double shot, a green concentrated light beam that cuts through enemies, and a red heat-seeing laser that locks onto any enemy it finds on the screen.

The game consists of seven stages, or "areas", including grassy plateaus, large oceans, mechanical bases and outer space. Each area features a boss that must be defeated in order to progress, including the Andor Genesis mothership from the original Xevious. The final stage features a fight with GAMP, the supercomputer leader of the Xevious forces. Much like the first game, large Sol towers can be found by bombing pre-determined spots on the ground, alongside Rally-X Special Flags that award an extra life when collected. Many references to other Namco games are featured as Easter eggs, including a Pooka from the Dig Dug series and a cheat code that replaces both players' Solvalou with Heihachi and Paul from Tekken, featuring their own ending sequences.

== Development ==
The System 11 hardware allows the world and characters to be much closer to those in the original Xevious arcade game.

With the advent of 3D arcade hardware in the late 1980s and 1990s, Namco became a leader in polygonal video games with titles like Tekken, Ridge Racer, and Alpine Racer. Their System 11 arcade hardware, while technologically inferior to other arcade systems, was a hit with arcade owners for its cheap price, which made it easily affordable for smaller arcade chains. After a brief downturn in the early half of the decade, the shoot'em up genre was beginning to see a revival with games like RayStorm, G-Darius, and Radiant Silvergun, and were very profitable. Wanting to cash in on this sudden revival, Namco decided to create a 3D sequel to Xevious for the System 11 board, featuring mechanics popular with other shooters to draw in newer players. Xevious was massively successful for Namco; the Family Computer version sold over one million copies and became a platinum seller, which gave Namco hope that it would perform well in the market. The increasing market for arcade game remakes also made the company feel the game would be commercially successful.

Xevious 3D/G was produced for the System 11 board, and was billed as its first shooting game. It had a heavy emphasis on its soundtrack, with most of it composed jointly by Shinji Hosoe and Ayako Saso. Being her final work for Namco before joining Arika, Saso incorporated a techno-style score similar to her previous work X-Day, and wanted to retain the classic Xevious sound design in the music instead of composing something radically different. She also wanted to convey the concepts of various guest artists that had contributed music for earlier games in the series. Nobuyoshi Sano and Hiroto Sasaki also contributed two pieces each to 3D/G, with the latter serving as the lead composer for 3D/G+, which features an entirely new soundtrack with contributions from Sano, Takanori Otsuka, Keiichi Okabe, Akihiko Ishikawa, Yoshie Arakawa, Etsuo Ishii, and Akitaka Tohyama. These composers employed similar ideas with the music, many of which have original Xevious tunes blended together with their own pieces.

The 3D capabilities of the System 11 hardware allowed the game to have a world closer to the one established in previous sequels, with settings such as large, Aztec-inspired structures and deserts being pulled from pieces of conceptual artwork for the original. It uses gouraud-shading techniques for its graphics. Namco chose not to utilize texture mapping for the game, as they felt the realistic style would detract from Xevious's futuristic, flad-shaded look.

== Release ==
Namco demonstrated Xevious 3D/G at the 1996 Amusement Operator's Union (AOU) tradeshow in February, alongside games such as Prop Cycle, Ace Driver Victory Lap, and Namco Classic Collection Vol. 2. Its 3D computer-generated graphics, cinematic cutscenes, and affordable price point were heavily pushed in marketing. The game was officially released in Japan on May 1; it was only sold as a conversion kit for other System 11 arcade games or Namco-manufactured arcade cabinets. A North American release was published later in the year, released in generic black-colored machines. The August 1996 issue of Edge magazine listed a European release date as "TBA". It is unknown if it was ever officially released in Europe.

In early March 1997, GameFan announced that Namco was reportedly underway with porting Xevious 3D/G to the PlayStation, in production alongside a conversion of Time Crisis. Titled Xevious 3D/G+, it was released on March 28 in Japan. Namco demonstrated the game at E3 1997 in North America, presented in conjunction with games like Ace Combat 2, Treasures of the Deep, and Namco Museum Vol. 5, before being publicly released on June 30. It was released later in the year in Europe. Alongside a port of 3D/G, it also includes ports of the original Xevious, Super Xevious, and Xevious Arrangement, the last of which was previously released in arcades as part of Namco Classic Collection Vol. 1. 3D/G+ also includes a new arranged soundtrack, slight graphical updates, and full-motion video cutscenes in-between levels. Because the System 11 arcade system board was designed after the internal hardware of the PlayStation, Namco had little difficulty in porting it over to the console. The Japanese version of 3D/G+ featured heavy slowdown problems, which were corrected in the North American release. It is compatible with the Namco NeGcon controller.

A techno soundtrack inspired by the music in 3D/G, titled Xevious 3D/G+ Techno Maniax, was published jointly by Namco and Pony Canyon in October 1997, alongside Tekken 3 Battle Trax. It featured tracks from the original game and newly-composed remixed versions. It was released under Pony Canyon's DigiGroove brand of albums, featuring additional extras alongside the music. Xevious 3D/G+ was digitally re-released for the PlayStation Store in Japan on June 26, 2013 under the Game Archives line of classic game re-releases, being available for both the PlayStation 3 and PlayStation Vita. It was followed by a North American release on February 25, 2015, alongside several other Namco-produced PlayStation games.

Hamster Corporation released the game as part of their Arcade Archives 2 series for the Nintendo Switch 2, PlayStation 5 and Xbox Series X/S in September 2026.

== Reception ==
Reception

Aggregate score
Aggregator	Score
GameRankings	69% (5 reviews)

Review scores
Publication	Score
AllGame	4.5/5 (PS1)
Computer and Video Games	2/5
Edge	7/10
Electronic Gaming Monthly	6.625/10 (PS1)
Famitsu	29/40 (PS1)
GameFan	66/100 (Note: GameFan's review of Xevious 3D/G was by three critics, two who scored it a 66/100 and one who gave it a 65/100.)
GameSpot	6/10 (PS1)
IGN	8/10 (PS1)
Joypad	46%
Next Generation	3/5 (PS1)
Play	72%

Award
Publication	Award
Famitsu	Silver Hall of Fame

While Xevious 3D/G saw success in its first few months on the market, it was seen as being inferior to other shooters already on the market, and was not nearly as successful as Namco hoped it would be. According to the May 1996 issue of Japanese publication Gamest, Xevious fans disliked 3D/G for straying from they felt made the original game so famous and well-designed, particularly in the inclusion of highly-destructive power-ups and pre-placed enemies, which was a stark contrast from the original's "no power-up" idea and for having different enemies appear as the players got better at the game. Edge magazine claimed that, aside from a well-made presentation, 3D/G was an average shooter at best, and was not as polished as other games available.

The PlayStation version also had a mixed reception. It was a commercial success with nearly 100,000 copies being sold, and was awarded the "Silver Hall of Fame" award from Famitsu magazine, but was characterized as inferior to the shoot'em up catalog already present on the console. Critics showed distaste towards its short length and lack of variety with its power-ups. Next Generation expressed disappointment towards the small amount of levels, claiming it can be finished in under an hour. GameSpot echoed a similar response, adding that the game's relatively low difficulty made it easy to beat it in a day. The four reviewers for Electronic Gaming Monthly said that the game's weakest point was its low amount of power-ups. Most reviewers also found that the slowdown is so prevalent that it significantly interferes with enjoyment of the game.

Most critics agreed that 3D/G had good gameplay and design. IGN, who showed the most positivity towards the game, adored its gameplay and power-up items for being well-made and fun. GameSpot said that it was a decent shooter with interesting mechanics, and that it felt like a true sequel to the original game. GameFan agreed, specifically praising that it tried to build on ideas established in the original instead of going for something radically different, claiming that it felt like a Xevious Gaiden for this reason. GamePro praised it for keeping the original gameplay of Xevious and the included arcade games, concluding, "While it may not be the perfect PlayStation shooter, 3D/G's heritage and plentiful gaming options make it a winner." Computer + Video Games and Next Generation specified that the game had great gameplay and expanded on the core concepts established in its predecessors in a way that made it feel fresh and new. Famitsu favorably compared the game to RayStorm for its gameplay, but that at heart it distanced itself from what made the original Xevious arcade game so successful in its heyday. IGN described the graphics as "Gourad heaven" and beautiful to look at. GameFan said that the simplistic-looking artstyle gave the game a cool, retro look to it, which Computer + Video Games agreed with. Several also complemented the addition of the other Xevious games, which IGN and GameFan claimed made the game worth the admission price. Electronic Gaming Monthly and GameSpot, by contrast, both argued that they felt more like a necessity due to the short length and quality of 3D/G. GameSpot in particular wrote, "The fact that Namco put all of the older Xevious titles on the disc is certainly admirable, but after playing 3D/G for a while, it becomes apparent that it was more of a necessity than anything else." The game's techno soundtrack and responsive controls were also the subject of praise.

Retrospectively, Hardcore Gaming 101 argued that 3D/G lost much of the charm that Xevious and its early sequels possessed, and that it felt more like a nostalgic homage than a proper, true sequel to the original. They said that the game suffered from bland visuals and dated gameplay, but that the techno soundtrack by Sayo and Hosoe made it worth playing anyway. Retro Gamer magazine delivered a much different response, praising the game for its evolution of the traditional Xevious gameplay formula for newer audiences. They favorably compared the game to Game Arts's Silpheed for its angled overhead camera and 3D visuals, saying that its fast-paced gameplay and fresh approach made it "a rather lovely remake" of the original. Retro Gamer also stated that its take on the gameplay of its predecessors made it one of the best classic game remakes of the era, concluding with: "The PSone played host to the heyday of the classic-remaker's art (Hasbro's update of Pong, for example, is one of the greatest games of the 32-bit era), and this is a fine example of the form."
