= Namco Classic Collection Vol. 1 =

1995 video game

- Japanese arcade flyer
- Developer: Namco
- Publisher: Namco
- Series: Namco Classic Collection
- Platform: Arcade
- Release: WW: November 1995
- Genre: Various
- Modes: Single-player, multiplayer
- Arcade system: Namco ND-1

Namco Classic Collection Vol. 1 (Note: Japanese: ナムコクラシックコレクションVol. 1, Hepburn: Namuko Kurashikku Korekushon Boryūmu Wan) is a 1995 arcade game compilation developed and published by Namco. It includes three of the company's most well-known games from the early 1980s — Galaga (1981), Xevious (1983), and Mappy (1983) — alongside brand-new "Arrangement" remakes of these games that have updated gameplay, visuals, and sounds. The arcade originals are also modified slightly to end after a certain number of rounds. Super Xevious (1984) is also playable. It ran on the Namco ND-1 arcade system, being one of the first games to utilize it.

Designed and released in conjunction with Namco Museum Vol. 1, Namco Classic Collection Vol. 1 represented the company's push to garner interest in re-releases of classic video games for newer hardware, with the Arrangement games being made to attract younger players to them. The development team had difficulties with porting the originals to the hardware, and as such made development last longer than anticipated. The soundtrack was to "immerse" players into the game's atmosphere, with sounds and musical cues that hearkened back to their childhood nostalgia.

Vol. 1 reportedly sold very well, and was commonplace in Japanese arcade centers. The collection and its games have been praised for their presentation and gameplay, with one critic saying that it could help open up a new market for re-releases of older arcade games. The Arrangement games have since been re-released several times as part of various Namco compilation disks for other platforms. It was followed by a sequel, Namco Classic Collection Vol. 2, in 1996.

== Games ==
In-game screenshot showcasing the game selection menu

Namco Classic Collection Vol. 1 is a compilation of three classic Namco arcade games from the early 1980s — Galaga (1981), Xevious (1983), and Mappy (1983) — as well as brand-new remakes of each game, known as "Arrangements". The original arcade games have been reprogrammed from scratch, and feature many of the same bugs and glitches present in their predecessors. Additionally, they end after a set number of rounds, featuring a proper ending sequence and credit roll. Super Xevious (1984), a Japan-exclusive update to the original Xevious, can also be played through the Xevious selection screen.

The three Arrangement games feature updated visuals, gameplay, and sound, alongside the addition of two-player co-operative play. Galaga Arrangement replaces the dual fighter mechanic from the original with a more traditional power-up system, where shooting down specifically colored Boss Galaga aliens with a capture fighter will instead transform the player into a new ship with different attacks, with their color indicating their ability; blue is a wide shot, yellow is a rapid-fire, and red fires three projectiles that can reflect off of other enemies and collide with others. The bonus stages, or "Challenging Stages", feature sporadic enemy formations that will circle around as the backgrounds warp and rotate in accordance with the enemy flight patterns. There are 30 stages in Galaga Arrangement, with the last stage being a boss battle against King Galaspark. Xevious Arrangement is close to the original game, featuring new enemies, different bosses, and a wide-shot power-up that can be found by bombing specific pyramid structures on the ground. Several different stage types have been added, such as ones that take place over mechanical fortresses and South American temples. There are also three extra stages that can be played after completing the game. Mappy Arrangement focuses primarily on its two-player co-op, featuring a split-screen stage design. It adds several new mechanics to the original Mappy gameplay, including trapdoors, springboards that propel either player to the floor above them, and a boss fight with a giant mechanical Goro robot.

== Development and release ==
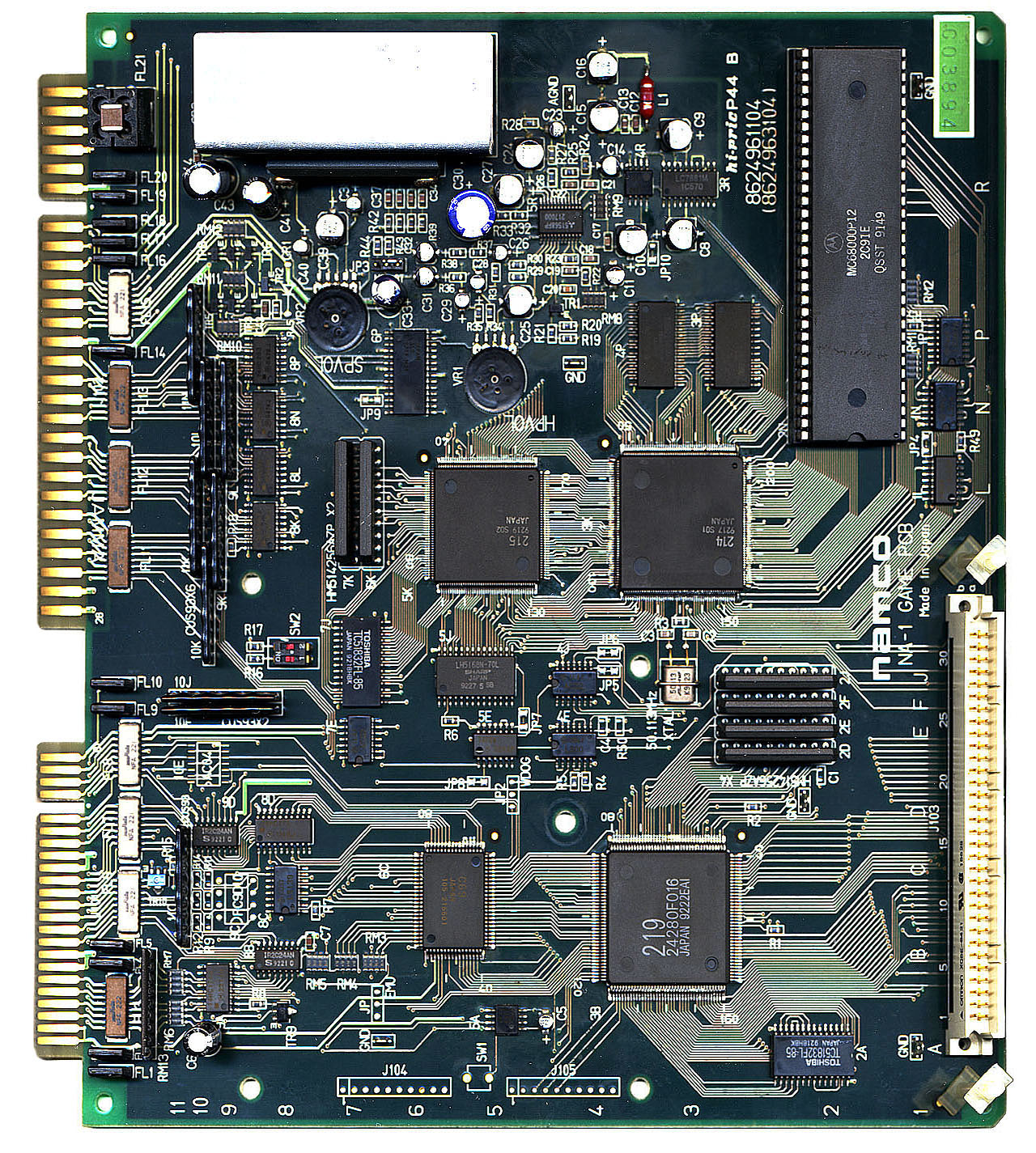
The development staff had difficulties with porting the original arcade games to a then-modern hardware.

Namco Classic Collection Vol. 1 was released worldwide by Namco in November 1995. Produced for the Namco ND-1 arcade system, the game was created out of the company's desire to increase interest in re-releases of older video games for newer audiences and more modern platforms, with the Arrangement games made to help attract in newer fans with improved visuals, gameplay, and music. It was released in conjunction with Namco Museum Vol. 1, a similar compilation published for the PlayStation. The development staff had difficulties with porting the original arcade games to a then-modern arcade system, which made development itself take longer than anticipated and more stressful for the designers. The soundtrack was to "immerse" players into the game's atmosphere, with sounds and musical cues that hearkened back to their childhood nostalgia.

The Arrangement games included have been re-released in other compilation disks. Xevious Arrangement, alongside the original Xevious, Super Xevious and Xevious 3D/G, was ported to the PlayStation in 1997 as part of Xevious 3D/G+, being a near arcade-perfect rendition. Galaga Arrangement was compiled into the 2001 Xbox, PlayStation 2 and GameCube game Namco Museum, as well as several other Namco video games. This version of the game is a recreation from the original arcade hardware, and features music at a slightly altered pitch because of this. The Galaga Arrangement included in Namco Museum Battle Collection (2005) and Namco Museum Virtual Arcade (2009) is not the same as the one in Vol. 1, instead being an entirely new game with mechanics and ideas borrowed from the original. Mappy Arrangement has never seen a re-release outside of arcades. In 1998, Pony Canyon released the soundtrack for Namco Classic Collection Vol. 1 under their Wonder Spirits album label, which included linear notes from the development staff and "battle cards", small cardstock cards that featured designs based on the game.

== Reception ==
Edge magazine viewed Namco Classic Collection Vol. 1 as being Namco's way of garnering interest in classic game re-releases through the usage of remakes of the included games, and praised the company for their efforts in doing so. They also called the included games "superb", and felt that both it and its home counterpart, Namco Museum Vol. 1, could potentially open up a new market for both re-releases and remakes of older games. Game Machine showed interest in the collection for compiling Namco's older catalog into a modern-day machine, alongside the addition of new, "exciting" remakes of each game.

The Arrangement games in particular have garnered praise, and were liked for their gameplay and presentation. In their review of Namco Museum for the GameCube, Xbox and PlayStation 2, GameSpot said that the Arrangement games included, particularly Galaga Arrangement, were fun to play, but that the originals were still the best. IGN by a stark contrast lambasted Galaga Arrangement for being what they labeled as a poor update to the original, harshly criticizing its design choices for being "terribly flawed", as well as its graphics for making projectiles and enemies hard to stop in the moving backgrounds. Retrospectively in 2018, Hardcore Gaming 101 found Mappy Arrangement to be the weakest of the three for failing to successfully build upon the original. While they liked some aspects of it, such as the hidden "real mode", they felt that it ultimately fell short compared to the other two. They wrote: "Though Namco ported many of their arranged versions to various compilations, this one stayed arcade exclusive, and for good reason – none of its additions are particularly well thought out, and is just another example of how the developers never really knew how to iterate on the original game". By contrast, Hardcore Gaming 101 commended Xevious Arrangement for its multitude of additions to the core gameplay of the original, including fixing many of its faults and bugs. They said the game "should be in game design manuals under 'how to successfully remake a classic game'" for being a successful update to the original Xevious, and one that was "pleasing to play" with the addition of a new soundtrack and power-up items.

== See also ==
- Namco Classic Collection Vol. 2
- List of Bandai Namco video game compilations
