= Tenkaichi Bushi Keru Nagūru =

1989 video game

- Cover art (front)
- Developer: Game Studio
- Publisher: Namco
- Platform: Nintendo Family Computer
- Release: JP: July 21, 1989
- Genre: Versus fighting game/role-playing video game
- Modes: Single-player, multiplayer

Tenkaichi Bushi Keru Nagūru (天下一武士 ケルナグール, lit. The Greatest Warrior on Earth - Kick and Punch) is a fighting video game developed by Game Studio and published by Namco. It was released for the Famicom on July 21, 1989, only in Japan. It is one of the earliest versus fighting games with role-playing video game elements.
