= Masanobu Endō =

Japanese game designer

- Born: February 23, 1959 (age 67); Shibuya-ku, Tokyo, Japan
- Education: Chiba University
- Occupation: Video game designer
- Years active: 1981–present
- Employers: Namco (1981–1985); Game Studio (1985–present)
- Known for: Xevious; The Tower of Druaga; Family Circuit

Masanobu Endō (遠藤 雅伸, Endō Masanobu; born February 23, 1959) is a Japanese game designer, president of Game Studio and Mobile & Game Studio, and the director of Digital Games Research Association Japan. He formerly worked for Namco, where he created arcade games and is best known for Xevious and The Tower of Druaga, which were important titles in the scrolling shooter and action role-playing game genres, respectively.

== Education ==
Endō graduated from the Yokohama Suiran High School and from the Department of Information & Image Science at the Chiba University.

== Career ==
In 1981, Endō joined Namco. During his time with the company, in 1982 he created the wildly popular shoot 'em up game Xevious, single-handedly designing, programming and drawing the graphics for the game. Later he produced The Tower of Druaga and Grobda, both released in 1984. Xevious set the template for vertical scrolling shooters, while The Tower of Druaga laid the foundations for action role-playing games.

After that he became independent, founding his own company called the Game Studio, where he continued to produce games in the Babylonian Castle Saga such as The Return of Ishtar, The Quest of Ki, and The Destiny of Gilgamesh (aka The Blue Crystal Rod). In addition, he produced Family Circuit and Tenkaichi Bushi Keru Nagūru for Namco, Kidō Senshi Z-Gundam: Hot Scramble for Bandai and Airs Adventure on the Sega Saturn.

Furthermore, he entered the mobile phone game market at an early stage, creating titles such as Sangokushi Nendaiki, Kētai Shachō, Unō Paradise, Beach Volley Girl Shizuku among others.

He supervised the production of the anime reboot The Tower of Druaga: The Aegis of Uruk and the MMORPG The Tower of Druaga: The Recovery of BABYLIM. When the final episode of the anime was broadcast on GyaO Jockey, he appeared on TV as a guest commentator with the name 遠藤雅伸★, explaining that it was his on-screen character.
