= Solvalou =

1991 video game

- Advertising flyer
- Developer: Namco
- Publisher: Namco
- Composer: Hiroyuki Kawada
- Series: Xevious
- Platform: Arcade
- Release: JP: December 1991
- Genre: First-person rail shooter
- Mode: Single-player
- Arcade system: Namco System 21

Solvalou (Note: Japanese: ソルバルウ, Hepburn: Sorubarū) is a 1991 first-person rail shooter arcade game developed and published in Japan by Namco. The sixth entry in the Xevious series, the player takes control of the Solvalou starship from a first-person perspective as it must destroy the Xevious forces before they take control of Earth. The Solvalou has two weapon types: an air zapper to destroy air-based enemies, and a blaster bomb to destroy ground-stationed enemies. It runs on the Namco System 21 arcade board.

Solvalou was advertised as a "hyper-entertainment machine" for its sit-down cabinet design and 3D shooting gameplay. The game is named after the starship the player controls in the series. Although it proved to be a commercial failure, Solvalou was well received by critics for its realism, 3D graphics and impressive hardware capabilities, with some finding it to be better than Namco's previous 3D arcade titles. It was digitally re-released for the Japanese Wii Virtual Console in 2009 as one of the first titles under the Virtual Console Arcade brand. A home port for the 3DO Interactive Multiplayer was announced in 1994 but never released.

== Gameplay ==
In-game screenshot

Solvalou is a first-person shooter video game set in the Xevious universe. Its plot takes place in the year 2015, following a war between humans and androids named the GAMP. The humans launch the titular starship to destroy the GAMP and its mothership before they wipe out the rest of humanity. The Solvalou is restricted to a pre-determined flight path, though players can move it around to avoid projectiles and obstacles that approach it. The game is divided into six levels that gradually increase in difficulty. In each of these, the Solvalou must make it to the end while destroying moving formations of enemies. The Solvalou has two weapons at its disposal: an "air zapper" that is used for destroying aerial enemies, and a "blaster bomb" that is used for destroying ground-stationed enemies. A maximum of five bombs can be launched at once, and the player needs to wait for them to regenerate before firing again. The top of the screen displays the player's health bar, or "shield", which depletes by one when inflicted by an enemy projectile. When the meter is drained, the game is over. At the end of each stage, players are scored based on how many enemies they defeated. Some levels end in a boss fight, usually with a mothership named the Andor Genesis.

== Development ==
Solvalou was released for arcades by Namco in Japan in December 1991. It was the fifth title from them to run on the Namco System 21 arcade board, previously used in titles such as Starblade and Galaxian3: Project Dragoon. Much like those games, it was advertised as a "Hyper-Entertainment Machine" by Namco for its cabinet design and 3D shooting gameplay. The game is named after the ship the player controls in the Xevious franchise. A home conversion for the 3DO Interactive Multiplayer was announced by Gamefan magazine in June 1994, however such a port was never released. It was digitally re-released for the Japanese Wii Virtual Console in Japan on March 26, 2009, which supported the Wii Remote's pointer to recreate the original arcade controls.

=== Music ===
"Ambience"
Solvalou features a hypnotic, minimal techno soundtrack inspired by the original Xevious. "Ambience" plays during the game's first area.

The music and sound effects in Solvalou were composed by Hiroyuki Kawada, a Namco veteran that worked primarily on established franchises such as Galaxian and Valkyrie. Kawada was enamored by Xevious's simplistic sine wave music cues, and wanted to incorporate this into the music for Solvalou. His familiarity with various forms of techno allowed him to further build on the kinds of sound effects in Xevious and "give them new colors". Kawada composed a hypnotic, minimal techno soundtrack that features remixes of Xevious music in addition to original pieces inspired by the original's world and aesthetic.

Kawada used Namco's recently acquired Apple and Digidesign sound tools to create the music, sampling music and sound effects from the sample editor program Alchemy and then programming it on a Macintosh computer. He produced hand-made sound effects with Turbosynth, a modular sequencer program, and created custom sound driver functions that could produce techno-inspired beats. These tools allowed Kawada to easily create music and sounds through single-line commands; Kawada said that "it was truly invaluable to be able to get a danceable groove with only a single command".

== Reception ==
Reception

Review score
Publication	Score
Gamest	35/50

Award
Publication	Award
Gamest	Best Graphic Award 3rd

Solvalou was well received at launch for its gameplay and hardware capabilities, though it has been perceived as a commercial failure despite Game Machine claiming it was the third-most-popular arcade game of February 1992 in Japan. Critics focused largely on the game's 3D graphics; Gamest awarded the game with the "3rd Best Graphic Award" at the annual Gamest Awards. A Gamest reviewer believed it was proof that Namco had perfected its 3D computer graphics technology, and another felt it provided the game with a proper sense of immersion. A Leisure Line writer stated that, with its impressive visuals and attractive sit-down arcade machine, Solvalou could fit well in line with Namco's other 3D arcade releases. S.E.A., a writer for Micromanía, considered the graphics to be the game's high point. Multiple critics believed Solvalou was an improvement over Namco's other 3D arcade releases, such as Starblade.

Critics felt that Solvalou's gameplay was challenging but fun. A GameFan commentator said the game was so great that it was almost worth traveling to Japan to play it. GamePro writer "Hack'n Slash" described it as being "breathtaking" and "pulse-pounding shoot-em-up" that cleverly blended together the basic concepts in Xevious with the action of 3D arcade games. Slash particularly liked the gameplay for remaining faithful to the original. S.E.A. agreed, and enjoyed Solvalou for its simplicity, but was critical of the difficulty, and noted that the player could easily become overwhelmed by the number of enemies and projectiles onscreen. Though they were satisfied with the game overall, Gamest writers felt it could have benefited from more content, and would only really please Xevious fans instead of the general public that Namco hoped it would bring. One felt the Xevious branding was unnecessary and would have been better as an original project. Critics generally believed the game was entertaining and was worth playing, with GameFan showing hope for it being released on the 3DO.

Retrospective feedback has also been positive. Retro Gamer's Stuart Campbell in 2006 believed Solvalou was a faithful update to Xevious, and his disappointment at the lack of re-releases and proper emulation for the game led him to label it as "one of the great "lost" coin-ops". In 2014, Carlo Savorelli of Hardcore Gaming 101 likened it to Konami's Solar Assault (1996), a similar 3D spin-off of Gradius. He was fond of its graphics for combining 3D flat-textured polygons with pre-rendered sprites. Game Watch writer Tetsuya Inamoto reviewed the Wii Virtual Console version in 2018 in light of the service's impending closure, noting that it was a surprise favorite for Wii owners. Though he was critical of its high difficulty, Inamoto claimed the 3D graphics and intuitive usage of the Wii Remote's pointer function made Solvalou a must-own on the platform.
