= The Tower of Druaga =

1984 video game

- Japanese arcade flyer
- Developer: Namco
- Publisher: Namco
- Designer: Masanobu Endō
- Programmer: Satoshi Naito
- Artist: Yuichiro Shinozaki
- Composer: Junko Ozawa
- Series: Babylonian Castle Saga
- Platforms: Arcade, MSX, Famicom, FM-7, Game Boy, PC Engine, X1, mobile phone, GameCube
- Release: June 1984: Arcade; JP: June 1984 MSX; JP: 1984 Famicom; JP: August 6, 1985 FM-7; JP: 1985 Game Boy; JP: December 31, 1990 PC Engine; JP: June 25, 1992 Mobile Java; JP: November 1, 2002 i-Mode; JP: February 21, 2003 GameCube; JP: 2003
- Genres: Action role-playing, maze
- Modes: Single-player, multiplayer
- Arcade system: Namco Mappy

The Tower of Druaga (Note: Japanese: ドルアーガの塔, Hepburn: Doruāga no Tō) is a 1984 action role-playing maze video game developed and published by Namco for arcades. Controlling the golden-armored knight Gilgamesh, the player is tasked with scaling 60 floors of the titular tower in an effort to rescue the maiden Ki from Druaga, a demon with eight arms and four legs, who plans to use an artifact known as the Blue Crystal Rod to enslave all of mankind. The game runs on the Namco Mappy arcade hardware (which is a revised/modified version of the Super Pac-Man hardware with a horizontally scrolling video system previously used in Mappy).

Druaga was designed by Masanobu Endō, best known for creating Xevious (1983). It was conceived as a "fantasy Pac-Man" with combat and puzzle solving, taking inspiration from games such as Wizardry and Dungeons & Dragons, along with Mesopotamian, Sumerian and Babylonian mythology. It began as a prototype game called Quest with interlocking mazes, revised to run on an arcade system; the original concept was scrapped due to Endō disliking the heavy use of role-playing elements, instead becoming a more action-oriented game.

In Japan, The Tower of Druaga was widely successful, attracting millions of fans for its use of secrets and hidden items. It is cited as an important game of its genre for laying down the foundation for future games, as well as inspiring the idea of sharing tips and guidebooks with friends. Druaga is noted as being influential for many games to follow, including Ys, Hydlide, Dragon Slayer and The Legend of Zelda. The success of the game in Japan inspired several ports for multiple platforms, as well as spawning a massive franchise known as the Babylonian Castle Saga, including multiple sequels, spin-offs, literature and an anime series produced by Gonzo. The 2009 Virtual Console release for the Wii in North America, however, was met with a largely negative reception for its obtuse design, which many said was near-impossible to finish without a guidebook, alongside its high difficulty and controls.

== Gameplay ==
Arcade screenshot

The Tower of Druaga is an action role-playing maze game video game. Controlling the knight Gilgamesh, the player must scale all 60 floors of the tower to rescue the maiden Ki from Druaga, an eight-armed and four-legged demon who plans to use an artifact called the Blue Crystal Rod to enslave mankind. Gilgamesh will need to locate a key on each floor in order to open a door, allowing him to proceed to the next floor.

Each floor contains enemies that Gilgamesh may need to defeat to progress, such as slimes, knights, projectile-firing wizards, ghosts that can travel through walls and fire-spewing dragons. Gilgamesh can defeat these enemies by hitting them with a sword — some will require multiple hits to defeat. Gilgamesh can also block a projectile by facing it with his shield. Each floor also has a hidden item that can be uncovered by completing tasks, such as defeating a certain number of enemies or inputting a specific code with the joystick. These items include a pickaxe that can destroy walls, boots that will drastically increase Gilgamesh's walking speed, and a candle that can reveal ghosts. Some of these items are required to fully beat the game, and failing to do so will either cause the player to die or make the game unwinnable.

A time limit is also present on each floor, and should the player take too long, two indestructible spherical enemies named "Will-o-Wisps" will charge towards Gilgamesh. Should the player forget to get a required item, they will instead be sent back, or "zapped", to an earlier floor to retrieve it. The game's mazes are randomized in each playthrough, although the treasure will appear at the player's starting point.

== Development and release ==
The Tower of Druaga was designed by Masanobu Endō, who had joined Namco in April 1982. After releasing Xevious a year later, an overwhelming success in Japan, Endō took a business trip to North America, where he bought a copy of Dungeons & Dragons. Intrigued by its gameplay and setting, Endō — a fan of the Apple II game Wizardry — had set out to make his next game an action role-playing title. After returning to Japan, he designed a basic prototype game called Quest, where the player would be able to explore inter-locking rooms while defeating enemies and using keys to open doors — an expanded version was then made to run on the Namco Super Pac-Man arcade system, where it was titled The Return of Ishtar. Upon completion, Endō was dissatisfied with the game's heavy use of role-playing elements, leading to the game instead becoming an action-oriented game with puzzle solving, conceived as a "fantasy Pac-Man".

For the second prototype, Endō took inspiration from Sumerian, Mesopotamian and Babylonian mythology, including The Epic of Gilgamesh and The Tower of Babel. Several characters were named after Mesopotamian and Indian gods, including antagonist Druaga and the goddess Ishtar. The game was made to run on the same hardware setup used in Mappy, which featured horizontal-scrolling and had a vertical screen layout, while the 60 floors were inspired by the Sunshine 60, the tallest building in Asia at the time. Music for the game was composed by Junko Ozawa, who also created a unique sound driver for the music. The promotional arcade flyer used miniature dioramas with cardboard cutouts instead of drawings, a response to Namco president Masaya Nakamura's hatred towards manga. The last frame in the poster has Gilgamesh wearing the horned helmet fighting Druaga, meant to imply that players would need it in order to finish the game. The Tower of Druaga was released for arcades in Japan in June 1984.

== Ports and re-releases ==
Druaga was ported to several Japanese game systems, including the MSX (1984), Family Computer (1985) and Fujitsu FM-7 (1985). A portable Game Boy version was released in 1990, followed by a 16-bit remake for the PC Engine in 1992. The Game Boy version was re-released in 1996 as part of the compilation Namco Gallery Vol. 2, which also included Galaxian, Dig Dug, and Famista 4. A 1997 Microsoft Windows port was released as part of Namco History Vol. 2, alongside several other early Namco arcade titles. In 2003, the Famicom version was re-released in Japan for the GameCube as a pre-order bonus for Baten Kaitos: Eternal Wings and the Lost Ocean. Two Japanese mobile phone ports were released: the first was a Java version on November 1, 2002, followed by an i-Mode version on February 21, 2003. In 2009, a digital version was released for the Wii Virtual Console as one of the four launch titles for the Virtual Console Arcade service, alongside Mappy, Gaplus, and Star Force. The Famicom version was released for the 3DS Virtual Console in December 2012, exclusively in Japan. Druaga would be included in several Namco Museum compilations, including Namco Museum Vol. 3 (1996), Namco Museum Battle Collection (2005), Namco Museum Virtual Arcade (2009) and Namco Museum Switch (2017). The game was re-released for the Nintendo Switch and PlayStation 4 under Hamster's Arcade Archives label in June 2022. The Famicom version was added to the Nintendo Classics library on April 9, 2026.

== Reception ==
Reception

Review scores
Publication	Score
AllGame	2/5 (retrospective)
Eurogamer	4/10 (Virtual Console)
IGN	3/10 (Virtual Console)

Award
Publication	Award
Gamest	The Best Game 13th

Upon release in Japan, The Tower of Druaga was an overwhelming critical and commercial success, attracting millions of fans with its use of puzzle-solving and action-oriented gameplay. It was Japan's second top-grossing table arcade cabinet of August 1984, after Karate Champ. The Famicom port was also a major hit. It has been cited as an important landmark of the role-playing genre and helped lay the foundations for future titles. Druaga has been cited as influential to many other Japanese role-playing games, including Ys, Hydlide, Dragon Slayer and The Legend of Zelda. Druaga also helped inspire the idea of note sharing with other players. In a 2003 interview, Endō stated he had somewhat regretted making the game as difficult as it is, noting that it might have made players more "paranoid" about finding secrets in games.

The Wii Virtual Console release in 2009 was met with a largely negative reception in North America, with many criticizing the game's controls, high difficulty and design. Reviewing the Wii Virtual Console port, Dan Whitehead of Eurogamer referred to the game's design as "diabolically obtuse" and criticized Gilgamesh's slow movement, notably with deflecting projectiles. Whitehead also criticized its hidden treasures for being too elusive and only appealing to dedicated players, but said it was an interesting gameplay idea. Brett Alan Weiss of Allgame also criticized its hidden items, especially those required for later levels, as well as the player's "wimpy" attack and time limit. Lucas M. Thomas of IGN was the most critical of the game, lambasting its "arbitrary, off the wall" item requirements, slow pace, and high difficulty, calling it "woefully boring and pointless" to play. He also noted that the player would need a walkthrough in order to fully beat it.

== Legacy ==
=== Sequels and spin-offs ===
The success of The Tower of Druaga would spawn a wave of sequels and spin-off games, collectively known as the Babylonian Castle Saga series. The first was released in 1986, The Return of Ishtar, which was based on the original prototype for Druaga. It was developed by Endō's game company, Game Studio, and published by Namco in arcades. Taking place right after the events of the original, two players controlled Gilgamesh and Ki as they made their way to the bottom of Druaga's tower with the Blue Crystal Rod. In 1996 it was ported to the PlayStation as part of Namco Museum Vol. 4. A Famicom prequel game, The Quest of Ki, was released in 1988 — controlling Ki, the player was to make it to the top of Druaga's tower in search of the Blue Crystal rod, leading up to the events of the first game.

A Super Famicom follow-up was released in 1994, The Blue Crystal Rod, also known as The Destiny of Gilgamesh. Gameplay was very different from earlier games, instead being a graphical adventure game with characters from the series. In 1996, two altered versions of the original game, Another Tower and Darkness Tower, were included as hidden extras in Namco Museum Vol. 3. They were made to be much harder than the original game and altered the requirements for finding the treasure. A Game Boy Color spin-off, Seme COM Dungeon: Drururuaga, was released in 2000.

In 2004, Namco partnered with Arika to develop The Nightmare of Druaga: Fushigi no Dungeon for the PlayStation 2, one of the few Babylonian Castle Saga games to be localized outside Japan. Part of the Mystery Dungeon series, the game is notorious for its extreme difficulty, where death would revoke all of the player's items and half of their money. An online-based arcade game was released in 2005, Druaga Online: The Story of Aon, which was followed by a similar PC game in 2009, The Tower of Druaga: The Recovery of Babylim. A spin-off game, The Labyrinth of Druaga, was released for Japanese mobile phones on January 12, 2011.

=== Related media ===
In 1990, Namco produced a theme park attraction based on The Tower of Druaga for Expo '90 in Osaka, alongside Galaxian 3. After the show's conclusion, it was then moved to Namco's Wonder Eggs amusement park in Tokyo in 1992, remaining there until the park's closing on December 31, 2000. A sugoroku medal game was released for arcades in 2000, Sugoroku Adventure: The Tower of Druaga, which also featured characters from Namco's Valkyrie series. Gilgamesh's red-striped shield and the Blue Crystal Rod appear as Sophita's alternative weapons in Soul Edge. The GameCube game Mr. Driller: Drill Land features a gamemode inspired by the game, titled The Hole of Druaga. Gilgamesh and Ki appear in Namco × Capcom as a pair unit. A Mii Fighter costume based on Gilgamesh was released for Super Smash Bros. for Nintendo 3DS and Wii U and its follow-up Super Smash Bros. Ultimate.

An anime series, The Tower of Druaga: The Aegis of Uruk, was produced by Japanese studio Gonzo and premiering on April 4, 2008, taking place roughly 80 years after the events of the original game. It was followed by a sequel series, The Tower of Druaga: The Sword of Uruk, premiering on January 8, 2009.

Several characters from the game have appeared in several other games. A theme based on The Tower of Druaga, with the game's characters is featured in Pac-Man 99 as special DLC.

== See also ==
- Tutankham (1982)
