= Game Studio (company) =

Japanese video game production company

Game Studio Corporation Ltd.
- Industry: Video games
- Founded: August 14, 1985; 40 years ago
- Founder: Masanobu Endō
- Subsidiaries: Mobile & Game Studio

Game Studio Corporation Ltd. (株式会社ゲームスタジオ) is a video game production company headquartered in Shinagawa, Tokyo, Japan. It was founded on August 14, 1985, by former Namco employee Masanobu Endō, who continued to develop projects for Namco through his company. The company is known for developing video games published by Namco, currently Bandai Namco Entertainment.

In April 2004, the company established a subsidiary company, Mobile & Game Studio.

== Notable works ==
| Year | Title | Publisher(s) | Platform(s) | Ref. |
|---|---|---|---|---|
| 1986 | Hopping Mappy | Namco | Arcade | |
| 1986 | Mobile Suit Z Gundam: Hot Scramble | Bandai | Nintendo Entertainment System | |
| 1986 | The Return of Ishtar | Namco | Arcade | |
| 1987 | Wizardry: Proving Grounds of the Mad Overlord | Nexoft | Nintendo Entertainment System | |
| 1988 | Family Circuit | Namco | Nintendo Entertainment System, TurboGrafx-16 | |
| 1988 | The Quest of Ki | Namco | Nintendo Entertainment System | |
| 1989 | Tenkaichi Bushi Keru Nagūru | Namco | Nintendo Entertainment System | |
| 1990 | Wizardry II: The Knight of Diamonds | ASCII Corporation | Nintendo Entertainment System | |
| 1991 | Family Circuit '91 | Namco | Nintendo Entertainment System | |
| 1991 | Itadaki Street: Watashi no Omise ni Yottette | ASCII Corporation | Nintendo Entertainment System | |
| 1992 | The Tower of Druaga | Namco | TurboGrafx-16 | |
| 1996 | Airs Adventure | Game Studio | Sega Saturn | |
| 2001 | DT: Lords of Genomes | Media Factory | Game Boy Color | |
| 2002 | Mystia | G-Mode | Mobile | |
| 2002 | Topolon | G-Mode | Mobile | |
| 2003 | Unō Paradise | G-Mode | Mobile | |
| 2004 | Mystia 2 | G-Mode | Mobile | |
| 2006 | Mystia 3 | G-Mode | Mobile | |
| 2010 | Ōkamiden | Capcom | Nintendo DS | |
| 2012 | Mikomikoin | Game Studio | Android, iOS | |
| 2013 | Jungle Gem Tournament | Amazon Games | Android | |
| 2015 | 50 Pinch Barrage!! | Mobile & Game Studio | Nintendo 3DS, Nintendo Switch, Microsoft Windows | |
| 2015 | Dragon Quest of the Stars | Square Enix | Android, iOS | |
| 2018 | Triple Monsters | Bushiroad | Android, iOS | |
| 2018 | Katana Maidens ~ Toji No Miko: Kizamishi Issen no Tomoshibi | Square Enix | Android, iOS | |
| 2019 | LovePlus Every | Konami | Android, iOS | |
| 2019 | Cardfight!! Vanguard Zero | Bushiroad | Android, iOS, Microsoft Windows | |
| 2020 | Kishi Fujii Souta no Shogi Training | Game Studio | Nintendo Switch | |
| 2023 | Infinity Strash: Dragon Quest The Adventure of Dai | Square Enix | Microsoft Windows, Nintendo Switch, PlayStation 4, PlayStation 5, Xbox Series X/S | |
| 2024 | Ao Oni | Game Studio | Microsoft Windows, Nintendo Switch | |
| 2025 | Ao Oni: The Horror of Blueberry Onsen | Game Studio | Microsoft Windows, Nintendo Switch | |
| 2025 | Mayhem Maidens | 0UP Games | Microsoft Windows | |
| 2025 | Synduality: Echo of Ada | Bandai Namco Entertainment | Microsoft Windows, PlayStation 5, Xbox Series X/S | |
| 2025 | Undergrounded | room6 | Microsoft Windows | |
| 2026 | Sword Art Online: Echoes of Aincrad | Bandai Namco Entertainment | Microsoft Windows, PlayStation 5, Xbox Series X/S | |

=== Canceled ===
| Title | Publisher(s) | Platform(s) | Ref. |
|---|---|---|---|
| Kingdom Hearts Missing-Link | Square Enix | Android, iOS | |
