= List of arcade video games: T =

This is a list of arcade video games organized alphabetically by name. It does not include PC or console games unless they were also released in video arcades. See Lists of video games for related lists.

Title	Alternate Title(s)	Year	Manufacturer	Genre(s)	Max. Players	PCB Model
T-MEK	—	1994	Atari Games	First-person shooter	2	
T.T Block	—	1977	Taito			
T.T Spacian Part-2	—	1979	Taito			
Ta-o Taido	—	1993	Video System			
Table Tennis Champions	—	1995	Gamart			
Tac/Scan	—	1982	Sega	Vertical shooter	2	
Tactician	—	1981	Sega			
Tag Team Wrestling	The Big Pro Wrestling! ^{JP}	1983	Technōs Japan	Sports	2	
Taiko no Tatsujin	—	2001	Namco	Rhythm	2	
Taiko no Tatsujin 2	—	2002	Namco	Rhythm	2	
Taiko no Tatsujin 3	—	2002	Namco	Rhythm	2	
Taiko no Tatsujin 4	—	2003	Namco	Rhythm	2	
Taiko no Tatsujin 5	—	2003	Namco	Rhythm	2	
Taiko no Tatsujin 6	—	2004	Namco	Rhythm	2	
Taiko no Tatsujin 7	—	2005	Namco	Rhythm	2	
Taiko no Tatsujin 8	—	2006	Namco	Rhythm	2	
Taiko no Tatsujin 9	—	2006	Namco Bandai Games	Rhythm	2	
Taiko no Tatsujin 10	—	2007	Namco Bandai Games	Rhythm	2	
Taiko no Tatsujin RT: Nippon no Kokoro	—	2005	Namco Bandai Games	Rhythm	2	
Taiko no Tatsujin 11	—	2008	Namco Bandai Games	Rhythm	2	
Tail Gunner	—	1979	Vectorbeam			
Taisen Hot Gimmick	—	1997	Psikyo			
Taisen Hot Gimmick 3 Digital Surfing	—	1999	Psikyo			
Taisen Hot Gimmick 4 Ever	—	2000	Psikyo			
Taisen Hot Gimmick 5	—	2005	Psikyo			
Taisen Hot Gimmick Integral	—	2001	Psikyo			
Taisen Hot Gimmick Kairakuten	—	1998	Psikyo			
Taisen Hot Gimmick Mix Party	—	2005	Psikyo			
Taisen Idol-Mahjong Final Romance 2	—	1995	Video System			
Taisen Mahjong Final Romance 4	—	1995	Video System			
Taisen Mahjong Final Romance R	—	1995	Video System			
Taisen Tanto-R: Sasi-Su!!	—	1996	Sega			Sega ST-V
Taisen Tokkae Puzzle-dama	—	1996	Konami			
Take Five	—	1975	Fun Games			
Talbot	—	1982	Volt Electronics			
Tang Tang	—	2000	ESD			
TANK	TNK III	1985	SNK			
Tank	—	1974	Atari	Shooter	2	
Tank II	—	1975	Atari	Shooter	2	
Tank 8	—	1976	Atari	Shooter	8	
Tank Battalion	—	1980	Namco	Shooter	2	
Tank Busters	—	1985	Valadon Automation	Shooter	2	
Tank Force	—	1991	Namco	Shooter	2	
Tant-R: Puzzle & Action	—	1992	Sega			
Tap-a-Tune	—	1993	Moloney Manufacturing			
Tapper	Root Beer Tapper	1983	Bally Midway	Action	2	
Targ	—	1980	Exidy		2	
Target Ball	—	1995	Yun Sung			
Target Ball 96	—	1996	Yun Sung			
Target Hits	—	1994	Gaelco			
Target Panic	—	1996	Konami			
Task Force Harrier	—	1989	UPL			
Tatakae! Big Fighter	Sky Robo	1989	Nichibutsu			
Tatsujin	—	1988	Taito			
Tatsunoko vs. Capcom	—	2008	Capcom			
Taxi Driver	—	1984	Graphic Techno EW			
Tazz-Mania	—	1982	Stern Electronics			
Team Hat Trick	—	1985	Bally Sente			
Tech Romancer	Choukou Senki Kikaioh	1998	Capcom	Fighting game	2	ZN-2
Technical Bowling	—	1997	Sega			Sega ST-V
Techno Drive	—	1998	Namco			
Tecmo Bowl	—	1987	Tecmo	Sports		
Tecmo Knight	Wild Fang	1989	Tecmo			
Tecmo World Cup '90	—	1989	Tecmo			
Tecmo World Cup '94	—	1994	Tecmo			
Tecmo World Cup '98	Tecmo World Soccer '98	1998	Tecmo			Sega ST-V
Tecmo World Cup Millennium	—	2000	Tecmo			
Tecmo World Soccer '96	—	1996	Tecmo			
Teddy Boy Blues	—	1985	Sega		2	
Tee'd Off	—	1986	Tecmo		2	
Teenage Mutant Ninja Turtles	Teenage Mutant Hero Turtles ^{UK}	1989	Konami	Beat 'em up	4	
Teenage Mutant Ninja Turtles: Turtles in Time	—	1991	Konami	Beat 'em up	4	
Tehkan World Cup	—	1985	Tehkan	Sports	2	
Teki-Paki	—	1991	Toaplan			
Tekken	—	1994	Namco	Fighting game		
Tekken 2	—	1995	Namco	Fighting game		
Tekken 3	—	1997	Namco	Fighting		
Tekken 4	—	2001	Namco	Fighting		
Tekken 5	—	2004	Namco	Fighting		
Tekken 5: Dark Resurrection	—	2005	Namco	Fighting		
Tekken 6	—	2007	Namco Bandai Games	Fighting		
Tekken 7	—	2015	Bandai Namco Entertainment	Fighting		
Tekken Tag Tournament	—	1999	Namco	Fighting		
Tel Jan	—	1999	Electro Design	Mahjong	2	
TelePachi: Fever Lion	—	1989	Sunsoft			
Telephone Mahjong	—	1989	Nichibutsu			
Tempest	—	1980	Atari	Tube shooter	2	
Ten Up	—	1988	JPM International			
Tengai: Sengoku Ace Episode II	—	1996	Psikyo			
Tenkomori Shooting	—	1998	Namco			
Teraburst	—	1998	Konami			
Terminator 2: Judgment Day	—	1991	Midway Games			
Terra Cresta	—	1985	Nichibutsu	Scrolling shooter	2	
Terra Diver	Soukyugurentai ^{JP}	1996	Raizing	Scrolling shooter	2	
Terra Force	—	1987	Nichibutsu	Scrolling shooter	2	
Terranean	—	1981	Data East			DECO
Tetris (Atari)	—	1989	Atari Games	Puzzle	2	
Tetris (D.R. Korea)	—	199?	D.R. Korea	Puzzle		
Tetris (Photon System)	—	1989	Photon System	Puzzle	2	
Tetris (Sega)	—	1988	Sega	Puzzle	2	
Tetris (Sega) System E	—	1988	Sega	Puzzle	2	
Tetris (Sega) Taito H	—	1988	Sega	Puzzle	2	
Tetris Dekaris	—	2009	Sega	Puzzle	2	
Tetris Fighters	—	2001	Sego Entertainment	Puzzle	2	
Tetris: The Absolute - The Grand Master 2	—	2000	Arika	Puzzle	2	ZN-2
Tetris: The Absolute - The Grand Master 2 Plus	—	2000	Arika	Puzzle	2	
Tetris: The Grand Master	—	1998	Capcom	Puzzle	2	
Tetris: The Grand Master 3 - Terror Instinct	—	2005	Taito	Puzzle	2	
Tetris Kiwamemichi	—	2004	Success			NAOMI GD-ROM
Tetris Plus	—	1995	Jaleco	Puzzle	2	
Tetris Plus 2	—	1997	Jaleco	Puzzle	2	
TH Strikes Back	—	1994	Gaelco		2	
Thief	—	1981	Pacific Novelty	Maze	2	
Thrash Rally	—	1991	Alpha Denshi	Racing	1	
The Three Stooges	—	1984	Mylstar		3	
Three Wonders	Wonder 3	1991	Capcom		2	CPS1
Thrill Drive	—	1999	Konami	Racing	1	
Thrill Drive 2	—	2001	Konami	Racing	1	
Thrill Drive 3	—	2005	Konami	Racing	1	
Thunder & Lightning	—	1990	Visco	Breakout		
Thunder Blade	—	1987	Sega	Rail shooter	1	
Thunder Ceptor	—	1986	Namco	Rail shooter	1	
Thunder Ceptor II	—	1986	Namco	Rail shooter	1	
Thunder Cross	—	1988	Konami	Scrolling shooter	2	
Thunder Cross II	—	1991	Konami	Scrolling shooter	2	
Thunder Dragon	—	1991	Tecmo	Scrolling shooter	2	
Thunder Dragon 2	Big Bang: Power Shooting ^{JP}	1993	NMK	Scrolling shooter	2	
Thunder Force AC	—	1990	Sega	Scrolling shooter	2	
Thunder Fox	—	1990	Taito			
Thunder Heroes	—	2001	Primetec Investments			
Thunder Hoop	—	1992	Gaelco			
Thunder Strike	—	1991	East Coast Coin			
ThunderJaws	—	1991	Atari Games	Platformer	2	
Tic Tac Trivia	—	1983	Merit			
Ticket Poker	—	1982	Cal Omega			
Tierras Salvajes	—	199?	Picmatic			
Tiger Heli	—	1985	Taito			
Tiger Road	Tora-he no Michi	1987	Capcom			
Timber	—	1984	Bally Midway			
Time Attacker	—	1980	Shonan			
Time Crisis	—	1996	Namco	Rail shooter	2	
Time Crisis 2	—	1998	Namco	Rail shooter	2	
Time Crisis 3	—	2003	Namco	Rail shooter	2	
Time Crisis 4	—	2006	Namco	Rail shooter	2	
Time Gal	—	1985	Taito			
Time Killers	—	1992	Strata	Fighting		
Time Limit	—	1983	Chuo			
Time Pilot	—	1982	Konami	Scrolling shooter	2	
Time Pilot '84	—	1984	Konami	Scrolling shooter	2	
Time Scanner	—	1987	Sega	Video pinball		
Time Soldiers	Battle Field^{JP}	1987	SNK	Scrolling shooter	2	
Time Traveler	—	1991	Sega		1	
Time Tunnel	—	1982	Taito	Maze	2	
The Tin Star	—	1983	Taito	Top-down shooter	2	
Tinkle Pit	—	1983	Namco	Maze	2	
Title Fight	—	1993	Sega			
Tobe! Polystars	—	1997	Konami			Konami M2
Toffy	—	1993	East Coast Coin			
Toki	JuJu Densetsu	1989	TAD Corporation	Platform game	2	
Toki no Senshi: Chrono-Soldier	—	1987	Sega			
Tōkidenshō Angel Eyes	—	1996	Tecmo	Fighting	2	
Tokimeki Mahjong Paradise: Dear My Love	—	1997	Nichibutsu			
Tokimeki Mahjong Paradise: Doki Doki Hen	—	1998	Media / Sonnet			
Tokimeki Memorial: Taisen Puzzle-dama	—	1995	Konami			
Tokimeki Memorial Oshiete Your Heart	—	1997	Konami			
Tokimeki Memorial Oshiete Your Heart: Seal Version Plus	—	1997	Konami			
Tokoro-san no Maamaajan 2: Tokoro's Cup	—	1994	Sega			
Tokoro-san no Maamaajan!	—	1992	Sega			
Tokushu Butai U.A.G.	Thundercade / Twin Formation	1987	Taito			
Tokuten Oh	Super Sidekicks	1992	SNK	Sports	2	NeoGeo
Tokuten Oh 2: Real Fight Football	Super Sidekicks 2	1994	SNK	Sports	2	NeoGeo
Tokuten Oh 3 - Eikoue no Michi	Super Sidekicks 3	1995	SNK	Sports	2	NeoGeo
Tokuten Oh: Honoo no Libero	Ultimate 11	1996	SNK	Sports	2	NeoGeo
Tokyo Bus Tour	—	2000	Sega			NAOMI cart.
Tokyo Cops: Special Police Reinforcement	—	2003	Gaelco	Driving	1	
Tokyo Gal Zukan	—	1989	Nichibutsu			
Tokyo Wars	—	1995	Namco	Action, Simulator	8	
Tom Tom Magic	—	1997	Hobbitron T.K.Trading			
Tomahawk 777	Tomahawk Missile	1980	Data East			
Tondemo Crisis	—	1999	Polygon Magic			
Tony-Poker	—	1991	Corsica			
Toobin'	—	1988	Atari Games	Action	2	
Top Blade V	—	2003	SonoKong			
Top Driving	—	1995	Proyesel SL			
Top Gunner (Exidy)	—	1986	Exidy			
Top Hunter: Roddy & Cathy	—	1994	SNK		2	NeoGeo
Top Landing	—	1988	Taito			
Top Player's Golf	—	1990	SNK		2	NeoGeo
Top Ranking Stars	Prime Time Fighter	1995	Taito			
Top Roller	—	1983	Jaleco			
Top Secret	—	1986	Exidy			
Top Skater: Sega Skateboarding	—	1997	Sega			
Top Speed	Full Throttle ^{JP}	1987	Taito	Racing	1	
Toppy & Rappy	—	1996	Semicom			
Tora Tora	—	1980	GamePlan			
Tornado	—	1982	Data East			DECO
Tornado Baseball	Ball Park ^{JP} T.T. Ball Park ^{JP}	1976	Bally Midway	Sports	2	
Torus	—	1996	Yun Sung			
Toryuumon	—	1994	Sega			
Total Carnage	—	1992	Midway Games	Multi-directional shooter	2	
Total Vice	—	1997	Konami			Konami M2
Tottemo E-jan: Feel So Good!! Senyu Idol Production!	—	1991	Seibu Kaihatsu			
Touch & Go	—	1995	Gaelco			
Touch de Uno!	—	1999	Sega			NAOMI cart.
Touch de Uno! 2	—	2000	Sega			NAOMI cart.
Touch de Zunou	—	2006	Sega			NAOMI GD-ROM
Touch Down Fever	—	1987	SNK			
Touch Down Fever II	—	1988	SNK			
Touchmaster	—	1996	Midway			
Touchmaster 2000	—	1996	Midway			
Touchmaster 3000	—	1997	Midway			
Touchmaster 4000	—	1998	Midway			
Touchmaster 5000	—	1998	Midway			
Touchmaster 7000	—	1999	Midway			
Touchmaster 8000	—	1999	Midway			
Tougenkyou	—	1989	Nichibutsu			
Tough Turf	—	1989	Sega			
Tournament Arkanoid	—	1987	Romstar		2	
Tournament Cyberball 2072	—	1989	Atari Games	Sports	2	
Tournament Pro Golf	18 Holes Pro Golf	1981	Data East			DECO
Tournament Solitaire	—	1995	Dynamo			
Tournament Table	—	1989	Atari	Sports	4	
Touryuumon	—	2005	Yuki			
The Tower	—	1981	Data East	Action		DECO
Tower & Shaft	—	2003	Aruze	Action		Aleck64
The Tower of Druaga	—	1984	Namco	Maze	2	
Toy Land Adventure	—	2001	Semicom			
Toy Fighter	—	1999	Sega			NAOMI cart.
Toy Pop	—	1986	Namco	Multi-directional shooter	2	
Toy's March	—	2005	Konami	Rhythm	2	
Toy's March 2	—	2005	Konami	Rhythm	2	
Track & Field	Hyper Olympic^{JP}	1983	Konami	Sports	4	
Trail Blazer	—	1987	Coinmaster			
Tranquillizer Gun	—	1980	Sega			
Transformer	Astro Flash^{JP}	1986	Sega	Vertical shooter	2	
TP Mahjong 2: Joshiryou de NE!	—	1999	Seibu Kaihatsu			
TP Mahjong 6: Scandal Blue - Midara na Daishoua	—	2001	Seibu Kaihatsu			
TP Mahjong 7: Trap Zone - Yokubou no Kaisoku Densha	—	2001	Seibu Kaihatsu			
Traverse USA	MotoRace USA; Zippy Race	1983	Irem			
Treasure City	—	1997	American Alpha			
Treasure Hunt: Puzzle & Action	Sando-R: Puzzle & Action^{JP}	1997	Tecmo			Sega ST-V
Treasure Island	—	1981	Data East	Maze	2	
Treble Top	—	1991	Bell-Fruit			
Tri-Pool	—	1981	Noma			
Tri-Sports	—	1989	Bally Midway			
Tricky Doc	—	1987	Tecfri			
Triggerheart Exelica	—	2006	Warashi	Scrolling shooter	2	
Trio the Punch	—	1990	Data East	Beat 'em up	2	
Triple Hunt	—	1977	Atari	Shooting gallery	1	
Triple Punch	—	1982	KKI			
Triv Five: Special Edition	—	1985	Status Games			
Triv Four	—	1985	Status Games			
Triv Quiz	—	1984	Status Games			
Triv Two	—	1984	Status Games			
Trivia (Ramtek)	—	1975	Ramtek			
Trivia (SMS)	—	1984	SMS			
Trivia Challenge	—	1985	Senko Industries			
Trivia Genius	—	1985	Enerdyne Technologies			
Trivia Madness	—	1985	Thunderhead			
Trivia Master	—	1985	PGD			
Trivia Quest	—	1984	Techstar			
Trivia R Us	—	2009	Apollon Global Technologies			
Trivia Whiz	—	1985	Merit			
Trivia Whiz - Edition 2	—	1985	Merit			
Trivia Whiz - Edition 3	—	1985	Merit			
Trivia Whiz - Edition 4	—	1985	Merit			
Trivial Pursuit (Bally Sente)	—	1984	Bally Sente			
Trivial Pursuit (JPM)	—	1996	JPM			
Trizeal	—	2004	Triangle Service			NAOMI GD-ROM
Trog	—	1991	Midway			
Trojan	Tatakai no Banka	1986	Capcom	Hack and slash	2	
Tron	—	1982	Bally Midway	Shooter	2	
Trophy Hunting: Bear & Moose	—	2002	American Sammy			
Tropical Angel	—	1983	Irem	Sports	2	
Trouble Witches - Episode 1: Daughters of Amalgam	—	2008	Studio SiestA			
Truck Kyosokyoku	—	2000	Namco			
Truco Clemente	—	1991	Miky S.R.L.			
Truco-Tron	—	198?	Playtronic			
Truxton	Tatsujin Oh	1988	Toaplan	Shooter		
Tsurugi: The Sword	—	2002	Konami			
Tsukkomi Yousei Gips Nice Tsukkomi	—	2002	Namco			
Tube Panic	—	1984	Nichibutsu	Tube shooter	2	
Tube-It	Cachat	1993	Taito	Puzzle	2	
Tugboat	—	1982	Enter-Tech			
Tumblepop	—	1991	Data East	Action	2	
Tunnel Hunt	—	1979	Atari	Shooter	1	
Turbo	—	1981	Sega	Racing	1	
Turbo Force	—	1991	Namco	Shooter	3	
Turbo Outrun	—	1989	Sega AM2	Racing	1	
Turbo Poker II	—	1993	Micro Mfg			
Turkey Hunting USA	—	2000	American Sammy			
Turkey Shoot: The Day They Took Over	—	1984	Williams			
Turret Tower	—	2001	Namco			
Turtle Ship	Geobukseon - Turtle Ship	1989	Philiko	Shooter	1	
Tutankham	—	1982	Konami	Scrolling shooter	2	
TV Gassyuukoku Quiz Q&Q	—	1992	Dynax			
Twin Action	—	1995	Afega			
Twin Adventure	—	1995	Barko			
Twin Bee	—	1985	Konami	Scrolling shooter	2	
Twin Brats	—	1995	Elettronica Video-Games			
Twin Cobra	Kyukyoku Tiger ^{JP}	1987	Toaplan	Scrolling shooter	2	
Twin Cobra II	Kyukyoku Tiger II ^{JP}	1996	Takumi	Scrolling shooter	2	
Twin Eagle: Revenge Joe's Brother	—	1988	SETA Corporation			
Twin Eagle II: The Rescue Mission	—	1994	SETA Corporation			
Twin Hawk	Dai Senpuu ^{JP}	1989	Taito	Scrolling shooter	2	
Twin Squash	—	1992	Sega			
Twinkle	—	1997	Semicom			
Twinkle Star Sprites	—	1996	ADK	Scrolling shooter	2	
Twins	—	1994	Electronic Devices			
Two Crude	Crude Buster ^{JP}	1991	Data East	Beat 'em up	2	
Two Tigers	—	1984	Bally Midway		2	
TX-1	TX-1 V8	1983	Tatsumi	Racing	1	
Typhoon Gal	Oona Sanshirou ^{JP}	1985	Taito	Fighting		
The Typing of the Dead	—	2000	Sega			NAOMI
