= Terra Force =

1987 video game

- Arcade flyer
- Developer: Nichibutsu
- Publisher: Nichibutsu
- Designer: Shigeki Fujiwara
- Platform: Arcade
- Release: JP: October 16, 1987
- Genre: Scrolling shooter
- Modes: Single-player, multiplayer

Terra Force (Note: Japanese: テラフォース, Hepburn: Tera Fōsu) is a 1987 scrolling shooter video game developed and published by Nichibutsu for arcades. It is a spinoff of the Cresta series, which includes Moon Cresta, Terra Cresta and Sol Cresta. It was initially only released in Japan. Hamster Corporation acquired the game's rights alongside Nichibutsu's intellectual property, releasing the game as part of their Arcade Archives series for the PlayStation 4 in 2016 and Nintendo Switch in 2019.

== Gameplay ==
The player controls a spaceship as they destroy alien enemies on a planet. Ever level starts on the surface, which is a vertically scrolling level where aliens and buildings can be destroyed for points. After a boss enemy is defeated, players access caverns where enemies are more widespread, while also having to avoid colliding with obstacles. Laser, bomb and "speed" power-ups are available in limited supply.

== Development ==
The game's development was led by Shigeki Fujiwara, co-creator of the Bomberman series, as his last project before leaving Nichibutsu for Hudson Soft. He envisioned a mix of MagMax's side-scrolling perspective and the vertically scrolling gameplay of Terra Cresta, leading to an ambitious mix of levels of both perspectives.
