= Wiping (video game) =

1982 video game

- Arcade flyer
- Developers: Nichibutsu; Jorudan
- Publisher: Nichibutsu
- Platform: Arcade
- Release: JP: December 1982; NA: January 1983
- Genre: Action
- Modes: Single-player, multiplayer

Wiping (Note: Japanese: ワイピング, Hepburn: Waipingu) is a 1982 action video game developed by Jorudan and published by Nichibutsu for arcades. It was released in Japan in December 1982 and North America in January 1983. It was re-released in North America as Rug Rats. It was the last game to have its programming outsourced by Nichibutsu to Jorudan, who had previously developed Crazy Climber and Frisky Tom for the company. Hamster Corporation acquired the game's rights alongside Nichibutsu's catalogue, releasing the game as part of their Arcade Archives for the Nintendo Switch and PlayStation 4 in June 2024.

== Gameplay ==
The player controls a vacuum cleaner who is instructed to clear a room of dust and defeat germs on the way. Bars of soap are hidden under the dust and can be collected when the dust on it is cleared; it can be used to defeat germs one at a time. Items that grant bonus points are hidden under the dust, which reveal a secret crown that grants more bonus points when all are collected. The game ends if the player is hit by germs.
