= UFO Robo Dangar =

1986 video game

- Developer: Nichibutsu
- Publisher: Nichibutsu
- Director: Shigeki Fujiwara
- Designer: K. Nakagawa
- Programmer: Vabi Vube
- Composer: Kenji Yoshida
- Platform: Arcade
- Release: September 1986
- Genre: Scrolling shooter

UFO Robo Dangar (Note: Japanese: UFOロボ ダンガー, Hepburn: Yūfō Robo Gangā) is a vertically scrolling shooter arcade video game released by Nichibutsu in 1986. It is a spinoff of the Cresta Series, which includes Moon Cresta, Terra Cresta and Sol Cresta. The game is inspired by the anime series UFO Robo Grendizer and Danguard Ace.

== Reception ==
Malc of Shmups rated the game ten out of ten, calling it his favourite shoot 'em up. He praised the gameplay for "sheer playability" while stating the graphics are "quite average and functional" and the music has an "arcadey melody over a heavy techno drum beat" that sounds strange yet pleasing at the same time.
