= 1980 in video games =

1980 saw the release of a number of games with influential concepts, including Pac-Man, Battlezone, Crazy Climber, Mystery House, Missile Command, Phoenix, Rally-X, Space Panic, Stratovox, Zork, Adventure, and Olympic Decathlon. The year's highest-grossing video game was Namco's arcade game Pac-Man, while the best-selling home system was Nintendo's Game & Watch. The Atari VCS (later called the Atari 2600) also grew in popularity with a port of Space Invaders and support from new third-party developer Activision.

== Financial performance ==
- The arcade video game market in the US generates $2.81 billion in revenue ($11 billion adjusted for inflation).
- Home video games sell $464 million ($1.81 billion adjusted for inflation) in the United States, with the Atari VCS leading the market with a 44% share.

=== Highest-grossing arcade games ===
The following titles were the highest-grossing arcade games worldwide in 1980.

Rank	Title	Gross revenue	Inflation	Cabinet sales	Developer	Distributor(s)	Genre	Ref
1	Pac-Man	$1,000,000,000	$3,900,000,000	100,000	Namco	Namco / Midway	Maze	
2	Asteroids	$700,000,000	$2,700,000,000	70,000	Atari, Inc.	Atari, Inc.	Shoot 'em up	
2	Galaxian	Unknown	Unknown	Unknown	Namco	Namco / Midway	Shoot 'em up	
2	Space Invaders	Unknown	Unknown	Unknown	Taito	Taito / Midway	Shoot 'em up	

==== Japan and United States ====
In Japan and the United States, the following titles were the highest-grossing arcade video games of 1980.

Rank	Japan (Game Machine)					United States			
Rank	Title	#1	#2	#3	Points	Cash Box	Play Meter	RePlay	Cabinet sales
1	Pac-Man	62	46	17	295	Asteroids			< 60,000
2	Galaxian	44	25	18	200	Galaxian			< 40,000
3	Crazy Climber	14	19	30	110	—N/a	Space Invaders		< 12,000
4	Moon Cresta	3	24	15	72	—N/a	Unknown	Missile Command	Unknown
5	Monaco GP	11	4	11	52	—N/a	Unknown	Rip Off	Unknown
6	Rally-X	1	6	3	18	—N/a	Unknown	Unknown	Unknown
7	Heiankyo Alien (Digger)	1	4	4	15	—N/a	Unknown	Unknown	Unknown
8	Pitch In	0	1	5	7	—N/a	Unknown	Unknown	Unknown
9	Super Speed Race	0	2	2	6	—N/a	Unknown	Unknown	Unknown
10	Sasuke vs. Commander	0	0	5	5	—N/a	Unknown	Unknown	Unknown
10	Space Invaders	0	1	3	5	—N/a	Unknown	Unknown	Unknown
10	Missile Command	0	2	1	5	—N/a	Unknown	Unknown	Unknown

=== Best-selling home video games ===
The following titles were the best-selling home video games in 1980.

Rank	Title	Platform	Developer	Publisher	Release year	Genre	Sales	Ref
1	Space Invaders	Atari VCS	Taito	Atari, Inc.	1980	Shoot 'em up	1,318,655	
2	Breakout	Atari VCS	Atari, Inc.		1978	Action	256,265	
3	Football	Atari VCS	Atari, Inc.		1979	Sports (American football)	248,502	
4	Bowling	Atari VCS	Atari, Inc.		1979	Sports	245,670	
5	Night Driver	Atari VCS	Atari, Inc.		1980	Racing	161,352	
6	Air-Sea Battle	Atari VCS	Atari, Inc.		1977	Shooter	160,093	
7	Circus Atari	Atari VCS	Atari, Inc.		1980	Action	148,756	
8	Street Racer	Atari VCS	Atari, Inc.		1977	Racing	89,269	
9	Video Olympics	Atari VCS	Atari, Inc.		1977	Sports	36,028	

=== Best-selling home systems ===
Rank	System(s)	Manufacturer	Type	Generation	Sales	Ref
1	Game & Watch	Nintendo	Handheld	—N/a	2,000,000+	
2	Atari Video Computer System (VCS)	Atari, Inc.	Console	Second	1,250,000	
3	TRS-80	Tandy Corporation	Computer	8-bit	290,000	
4	Intellivision	Mattel	Console	Second	200,000	
5	Atari 400 / Atari 800	Atari, Inc.	Computer	8-bit	200,000	
6	Commodore PET	Commodore International	Computer	8-bit	90,000	
7	Apple II	Apple Inc.	Computer	8-bit	79,500	
8	HP 9800 / HP Series 80	Hewlett-Packard	Computer	8-bit	11,300	
9	North Star Horizon	North Star Computers	Computer	8-bit	8,200	
10	TI-99/4	Texas Instruments	Computer	16-bit	8,100	

== Events ==
=== Awards ===
- Electronic Games hosts the first Arcade Awards, the first video game awards ceremony. It awards games released during 1978–1979, with Space Invaders winning the overall Game of the Year award.

=== Business ===
- New companies: Broderbund, Bug-Byte, HAL Laboratory, Human Engineered Software, Mindscape, On-Line Systems, Sirius, Sir-Tech.
- Mattel creates the original five-programmer Intellivision game design team, later nicknamed the Blue Sky Rangers in 1982 in a TV Guide interview.

== Notable releases ==
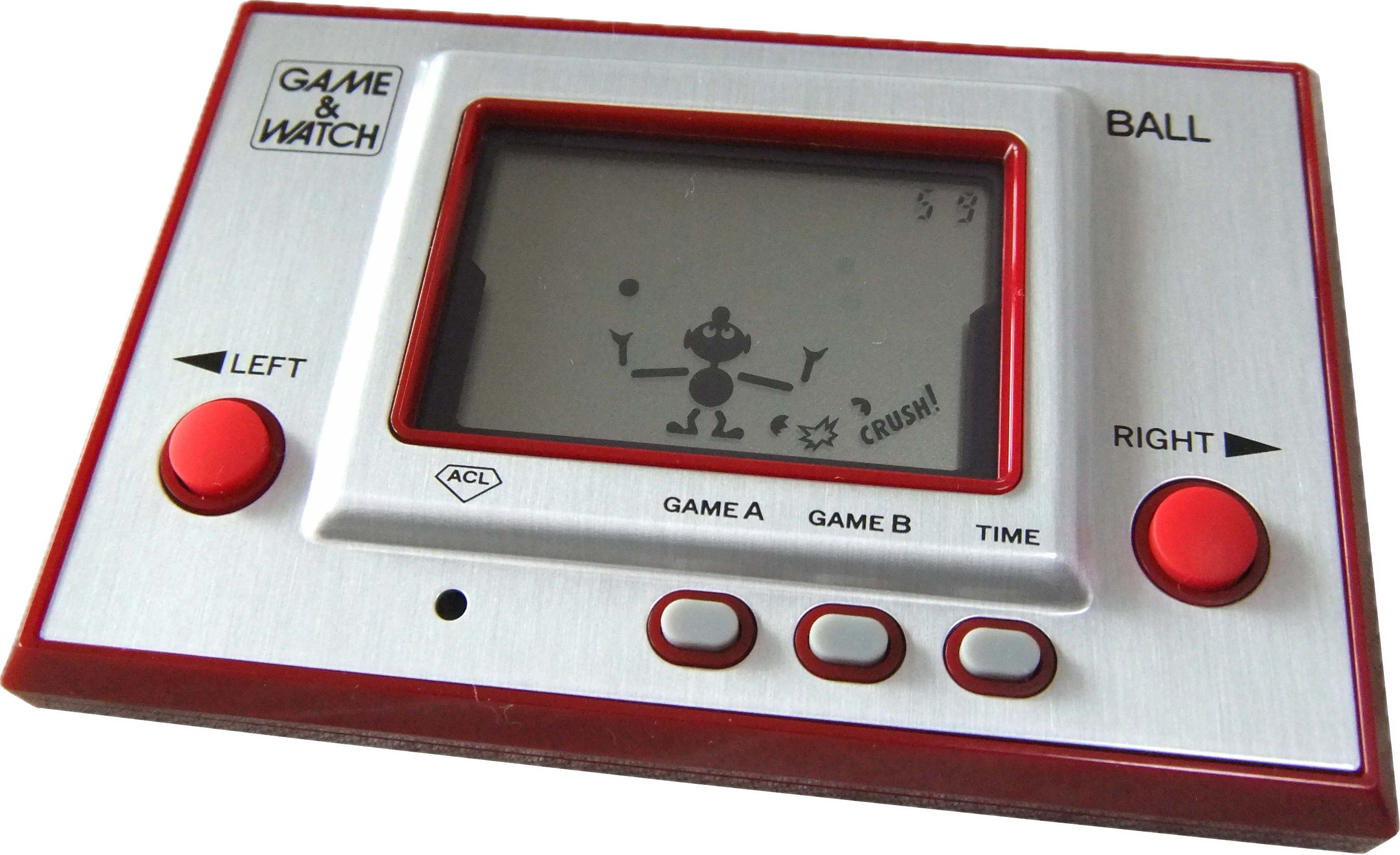
Game & Watch

=== Games ===
Arcade

- May 22 – Namco releases Pac-Man (originally Puckman in Japan). It becomes the highest-grossing game of all time. It has the first gaming mascot character, established the maze chase genre, opened gaming to female audiences, introduced power-ups, and told a story through cutscenes.
- May – Stratovox from Sun Electronics is the first game with voice synthesis.
- July – Atari, Inc. releases the cold-war-inspired Missile Command.
- October – Nichibutsu releases the vertically scrolling Crazy Climber, the first video game with a climbing mechanic and an objective of climbing to the top of the level.
- November 12 – Stern Electronics releases Berzerk, with designer Alan McNeil's signature on the monitor glass of each cabinet.
- November – Namco releases Rally-X, the first game with a bonus round. It also features multi-directional scrolling.
- November – Universal releases Space Panic, the first game with platforms and ladders. The term platform game was still several years in the future.
- November – Atari, Inc. releases first-person 3D tank shooter Battlezone.
- Cinematronics releases Star Castle. In 1982 the Atari 2600 port ends up as Yars' Revenge.
- Midway's Wizard of Wor is released, allowing two players to fight simultaneously in monster-filled mazes.
- The multi-stage Phoenix sports one of the first video-game bosses: a purple alien in a mothership.

Console

- Atari, Inc.'s port of Space Invaders becomes the killer app for the VCS and the first console title to sell a million copies.
- The first batch of games from Activision, all for the Atari VCS, hits stores: Dragster, Fishing Derby, Boxing, Bridge, and Checkers.

Computer

- December – Infocom releases its first game, Zork (later called Zork I), which begins the Zork series.
- The mainframe game Rogue is written by Michael Toy, Glenn Wichman, and Ken Arnold, eventually spawning a crowded genre of Roguelike games.
- Edu-Ware releases The Prisoner for the Apple II, loosely based upon the 1960s TV series of the same name.
- Strategic Simulations releases its first game: Computer Bismarck for the TRS-80.
- Microsoft publishes Olympic Decathlon for the TRS-80, a track and field video game which precedes Konami's Track & Field and The Activision Decathlon by three years.
- On-Line Systems publishes its first title, the graphic adventure Mystery House for the Apple II.

Handheld

- Nintendo releases the Game & Watch series of LCD handheld electronic games by Gunpei Yokoi.

=== Hardware ===
Arcade

- December – Data East releases the DECO Cassette System, the first standardized arcade platform, for which many games are developed.

Console

- Mattel releases the Intellivision home video game console.
- PPZ Ameprod releases the Ameprod TVG-10 dedicated home video game console in Poland.
- The BSS 01 dedicated home video game console is released only in Germany.

Computer

- The Sinclair ZX80 and Acorn Atom are the first home computers to play games in the UK.
- Tandy releases the first version of the Tandy Color Computer.

== See also ==
- 1980 in games
