= Crazy Climber 2 =

1988 video game

- Arcade flyer
- Developer(s): Nichibutsu
- Publisher(s): Nichibutsu
- Designer(s): Shigeki Fujiwara
- Composer(s): Takeshi Yoshida
- Series: Crazy Climber
- Platform(s): Arcade, X68000
- Release: Arcade: JP: December 1988; X68000: JP: August 27, 1993
- Genre(s): Action
- Mode(s): Single-player, multiplayer

Crazy Climber 2 (Note: Japanese: クレイジークライマー2, Hepburn: Kureijī Kuraimā 2) is a 1988 action video game developed and published by Nichibutsu for arcades. It is the sequel to the 1980 arcade game Crazy Climber. The core gameplay is mostly the same. Unlike its predecessor, Crazy Climber 2 was only released in Japan in arcades. Hamster Corporation released the game outside Japan for the first time through the Arcade Archives series for the PlayStation 4 in 2015 and Nintendo Switch in 2020.

== Gameplay ==
Crazy Climber 2 utilizes the same gameplay as its predecessor, but contains numerous innovations made possible by advancing technology. The player character again scales buildings in increasingly absurd locales in the United States, where obstacles such as advertisements and locals disrupt the player's progress. Numerous popular culture references, such as a gorilla resembling King Kong also scaling a building, the player character scaling a replica of the Empire State Building and rescued by a helicopter, in addition to kissing girls who award the player points upon meeting, showcase the game's low-brow humor.

== Reception ==
In Japan, Game Machine listed Crazy Climber 2 on their November 15, 1988 issue as being the fourteenth most-successful table arcade unit of the year.
