= Moon Cresta =

1980 video game

- North American arcade flyer
- Developers: Nichibutsu; Jorudan
- Publishers: JP/EU: Nichibutsu; NA: Sega/Gremlin/Centuri
- Designer: Shigeki Fujiwara
- Series: Cresta Series
- Platforms: Arcade, ZX Spectrum, Commodore 64, BBC Micro, Amstrad CPC, Dragon 32, X68000, Super NES
- Release: Arcade: JP: February 15, 1980; NA: June 15, 1980; EU: 1980
- Genre: Fixed shooter
- Modes: Single-player, multiplayer
- Arcade system: Namco Galaxian

Moon Cresta (Note: Japanese: ムーンクレスタ, Hepburn: Mūn Kuresuta) is a 1980 fixed shooter video game developed by Jorudan and published by Nichibutsu for arcades. In North America, it was licensed to Sega/Gremlin and Centuri, the latter releasing it in arcades as Eagle. Incentive Software published ports of Moon Cresta for the Amstrad CPC, Commodore 64, Dragon 32 and ZX Spectrum home computers.

== Gameplay ==
In-game screenshot

The player begins the game with a small spaceship armed with a single laser cannon. After successfully completing the first four waves of alien attacks, the player must attempt to dock the ship with the next 'stage' of the ship. This second stage has two lasers in addition to the original one. Each docked stage is one of the player's "lives".

After successfully clearing two more waves of aliens, the player must again dock with the third and final piece of the ship, which also has two more lasers (giving the player five lasers in total). The trade-off for this is that the entire ship is a much larger target. Failure to correctly align the stages during either docking sequence causes the destruction of the stage being docked with.

After completing the first eight waves, the player's ship reverts to the first stage and the process is repeated. If any of the player's three ships are lost along the way, the docking sequence occurs only after the first four waves have been completed. Play ends when all three of the player's ship-stages are destroyed.

== Ports ==
Home version were released for the ZX Spectrum, Commodore 64, BBC Micro, Amstrad CPC, Dragon 32/64, and X68000.

Centuri released the game in arcades in North America as Eagle, with altered graphics and the addition of an eagle-shaped enemy. The flyer used the slogan "The Eagle has landed".

Moon Cresta was released for the PlayStation 4 in May 2015 and Nintendo Switch in January 2019 by Hamster Corporation under their Arcade Archives series, after Nichibutsu's intellectual property was sold to Hamster Corporation upon dissolution. In 2022, the game was released as an in-built game on the Sega Astro City Mini V.

== Reception ==
Reception

Review scores
Publication	Score
AllGame	2.5/5
Crash	90%
Eurogamer	9/10
Sinclair User	3/5
Your Spectrum	2/3

Award
Publication	Award
Crash	Smash!

Moon Cresta helped propel Nichibutsu into the video game business, and it was one of their most successful arcade games. In Japan, it was the fourth highest-earning arcade game of 1980, below Pac-Man, Galaxian and Crazy Climber.

Computer and Video Games commented on the game's visuals for being bright and colorful, and its gameplay for being captivating. Game Machine felt the same way, recognizing it as a sure-hit for arcades because of its gameplay and mechanics.

The ZX Spectrum port published by Incentive Software was met with mixed reviews. Your Spectrum said that the gameplay was close to the arcade original, but felt that it was beginning to show its age. Sinclair User had a similar response, and commented that the only reason to even play it was to win a contest held by Incentive. They said that the game was a good conversion of the original, but the gameplay itself was dated and not as fun as other games for the system. Crash magazine was a lot more positive towards the game, awarding it a "Crash Smash" award; they applauded it for its simplistic gameplay, accurate portrayal of the arcade game, and its overall addictiveness, saying: "At a time when the emphasis tends to be on complicated arcade/adventures or third generation platform games, I think it's brave of Incentive to release an old fashioned shoot em up like this, and I'm thankful that they have. Great fun!"

=== Retrospective ===
In 1998, Allgame said that while Moon Cresta had several unique ideas, particularly the ship docking mechanic "slick" controls, and its fast-paced action, it was ultimately hampered by its high difficulty level. They said that the tough gameplay would put off a lot of players: "Slick controls, distinctive graphics and almost-musical sound effects add up to a memorable package, but one which was too tough for some casual gamers to master". By contrast in 2007, Eurogamer greatly praised the game for its addictive nature, creativity, and overall challenge that helped set the standard for games to follow. They said: "I still, to this very day, admire Moon Cresta for being an adrenalin-fuelled, no nonsense shmup that epitomises the simplistic gaming challenges of early arcade games. Left, right and fire was all it took to take a young impressionable teenager from a world where potting the black was the challenge of the day".

In a 2016 retrospective review, Hardcore Gaming 101 labeled Moon Cresta as being an influential and well-regarded shooter from the era. They greatly praised the game's key differences from games like Galaxian and Galaga, such as the ship docking mechanic. Hardcore Gaming 101 felt mixed towards the Super Famicom and PlayStation conversions, disliking both version's modifications to the enemy speed and other characteristics in the game, which they said might put off fans of the original. Retro Gamer felt the same way about the arcade original, saying that Moon Cresta had several differences that made it stand out from Galaxian and Galaga, and that it was an entertaining and important game in its own right. They praised the game's large layer of strategy and scoring, alongside the ship docking mechanic. Retro Gamer concluded their review by writing: "By predating Galaga's multiple ship mechanic and introducing a range of diverse enemies, Moon Cresta is rightfully regarded as a key stage in the development of arcade shooters".

== Legacy ==
Moon Cresta spawned a series of sequels, spin-offs and alterations. Gremlin Industries released Super Moon Cresta, a modification kit that allows the enemies to fire back at the level and changes some of the text. Nichibutsu itself created Moon Quasar, a spin-off that gives the second ship more firepower and a brief "refueling" segment, where the player must dock their vessel into a mothership towards the center of the screen.

Moon Cresta became the first installment of the Cresta Series, which spans into 5 installments and two spinoffs. The first sequel to Moon Cresta was released in 1985, titled Terra Cresta. It is a vertically scrolling shooter where players collect different ship pieces that each provide a new weapon. The first spin-off game in the series, UFO Robo Dangar, was released in 1986 that was similar to Terra Cresta, where the player controls a giant mecha instead of a starship. In 1987, Nichibutsu released Terra Force, another spinoff game which adds horizontal-scrolling segments alongside the vertical-scrolling ones from Terra Cresta. A direct sequel to Terra Cresta, titled Terra Cresta II: Mandler's Counterattack, was released in 1992 for the PC Engine in Japan, adding new stage designs, additional bosses, and more weapons and power-ups to use. A 3D follow-up, Terra Cresta 3D, was released in 1997 for the Sega Saturn, being one of Nichibutu's final games; it serves as a 3D update to Terra Cresta, with new stages and weapon types. After Hamster Corporation acquired the game as part of Nichibutsu's intellectual property, they released the game as part of their Arcade Archives series for the PlayStation 4 in 2015 and Nintendo Switch in 2019. A fourth sequel developed by PlatinumGames, Sol Cresta, was released in February 2022.

In 2022, the original arcade version was included in the Sega Astro City Mini V, a vertically-oriented variant of the Sega Astro City mini console.
