= Spinner-87 Legion =

1987 video game

- Arcade flyer
- Developer: Nichibutsu
- Publisher: Nichibutsu
- Platform: Arcade
- Release: JP: May 1987; NA: November 1987
- Genre: Scrolling shooter
- Modes: Single-player, multiplayer

Spinner-87 Legion (Note: Japanese: 超時迷宮レジオン, Hepburn: Chōtoki Meikyū Rejion) is a 1987 vertically scrolling shooter video game developed and published by Nichibutsu for arcades. It was released in Japan in May 1987 and North America in November 1987. Hamster Corporation acquired the rights to the game alongside Nichibutsu's properties, releasing the game as part of their Arcade Archives series for the Nintendo Switch and PlayStation 4 in May 2024.

== Gameplay ==
The player controls fighter planes which aim to defeat the Dark Empire. The player can shoot two types of ammunition to defeat enemies while navigating levels. The player is equipped with a "time bomb", which allows players to rewind one second each time one is used, even if the player is defeated, which usually requires three bombs, but less bombs can be used if activated early. Friendly soldiers can be rescued and placed into a mobile healthcare facility for extra points.
