= Roller Jammer =

1984 video game

- North American arcade flyer
- Developer: Alice
- Publisher: Nichibutsu
- Platform: Arcade
- Release: JP: 1984; NA: March 1985
- Genre: Racing
- Modes: Single-player, multiplayer

Roller Jammer (Note: Japanese: ローラージャマー, Hepburn: Rōrā Jamā) is a 1984 racing video game developed by Alice and published by Nichibutsu for arcades. It was released in Japan in 1984 and North America in March 1985. Hamster Corporation acquired the game's rights alongside Nichibutsu's portfolio, releasing the game as part of their Arcade Archives series for the Nintendo Switch and PlayStation 4 in July 2022.

== Gameplay ==
The player controls a roller skater who races against teams of other skaters. The game starts with a training course where the player grabs flags while skating along a path. In the actual race, the skater attempts to pass other skaters or punch them off the path, while navigating increasingly tight paths; passing a set number of skaters grants points and extra time. The game ends when the allotted time limit, providing that the player could not acquire extra time on time, passes.
