= Soldier Girl Amazon =

1986 video game

- North American arcade flyer
- Developer: Nichibutsu
- Publisher: Nichibutsu
- Platform: Arcade
- Release: JP: June 1986; NA: September 1986
- Genre: Scrolling shooter
- Modes: Single-player, multiplayer

Soldier Girl Amazon, released in Japan as Holy Warrior Amatelass (Note: Japanese: 聖戦士アマテラス, Hepburn: Seisenshi Amaterasu), is a 1986 vertically scrolling shooter video game developed and published by Nichibutsu for arcades. It was released in Japan in June 1986 and North America in September 1986. Hamster Corporation acquired the game's rights alongside Nichibutsu's intellectual property, releasing it as part of their Arcade Archives series for the PlayStation 4 in 2016 and Nintendo Switch in 2022.

== Gameplay ==
The player controls the titular sun goddess and intergalactic warrior Amaterasu, who wields a magical sword and shield to defeat enemies with energy beams, in order to capture prisoners who escaped from a distant planet. Amaterasu can shoot in all directions in a manner similar to Capcom's Commando. She starts off with a less powerful energy beam and can be easily killed in one hit, but a motorcycle grants her improved mobility and an extra hit point. The weapon and motorcycle can be upgraded with power-ups to become respectively more powerful and turn into a spaceship with more hit points. A limited supply of bombs are available to defeat enemies more easily. Each level ends with a boss enemy's spaceship, which when defeated will reveal its driver, a prisoner, for Amaterasu to capture.
