= Cop 01 =

1985 video game

- Arcade flyer
- Developer: Nichibutsu
- Publisher: Nichibutsu
- Platform: Arcade
- Release: JP: September 1985
- Genre: Run and gun
- Modes: Single-player, multiplayer

Cop 01 (Note: Japanese: コップゼロワン, Hepburn: Koppu Zero Wan) is a 1985 run and gun video game developed and published by Nichibutsu for arcades. It was released only in Japan in September 1985. It parodies the James Bond series, referencing Thunderball (1965) in its gameplay. Hamster Corporation acquired the game's rights alongside Nichibutsu's catalogue, releasing the game outside Japan for the first time as part of their Arcade Archives series for the Nintendo Switch and PlayStation 4 in June 2023.

== Gameplay ==
The player controls a detective, James, who infiltrates a secret base to rescue his partner Stacie from the evil organization Spectre, navigating levels while a trail of fire forces him to move forward. He is armed with a gun to defeat enemies as well as a jetpack, which allows him to jump higher than usual to reach and shoot high-up objects. The game ends after the player loses all his lives or shoots the antagonist in the face to free Stacie.
