= Mighty Guy =

1986 video game

- Arcade flyer
- Developer: Nichibutsu
- Publisher: Nichibutsu
- Platform: Arcade
- Release: JP: March 1986
- Genre: Run and gun
- Modes: Single-player, multiplayer

Mighty Guy (Note: Japanese: マイティガイ, Hepburn: Maiti Gai) is a 1986 run and gun video game developed and published by Nichibutsu for arcades. It was released only in Japan in March 1986. Hamster Corporation released the game outside Japan for the first time as part of their Arcade Archives series for the Nintendo Switch and PlayStation 4 in January 2024.

== Gameplay ==
The player controls the titular character, which aims to destroy a supercomputer after going through.levels and defeating enemies. The player can punch and kick enemies with the two buttons, but holding them will cause the player to fire a projectile which can move across the entire screen to defeat enemies, at a cost of the player being rendered immobile and a gradual fall in hit points. Guns and bazookas can be picked up and used to shoot enemies.
