= Ninja Emaki =

1986 video game

- Arcade flyer
- Developer: Nichibutsu
- Publisher: Nichibutsu
- Platform: Arcade
- Release: JP: October 1986; NA: February 1987
- Genre: Run and gun
- Modes: Single-player, multiplayer

Ninja Emaki (Note: Japanese: 忍者絵巻, Hepburn: Ninja Emaki), released in Japan as Yōma Ninhōjō (Note: Japanese: 妖魔忍法帖, Hepburn: Yōma Ninhōjō; lit. "Demon Ninja Scroll"), is a 1986 run and gun video game developed and published by Nichibutsu for arcades. It was released in Japan in October 1986 and North America in February 1987. Hamster Corporation acquired the game's rights alongside Nichibutsu's assets, releasing the game as part of their Arcade Archives series for the Nintendo Switch and PlayStation 4 in July 2024, as well as their Arcade Archives 2 series for the Nintendo Switch 2, PlayStation 5 and Xbox Series X/S in August 2026.

== Gameplay ==
The player controls Shinbei, who aims to rescue a princess from an evil spirit army. He can shoot enemies with arrows, as well as 8 kinds of magic with more versatile projectiles which are available for 20 seconds when a scroll is picked up. The first level is akin to a vertically scrolling shooter, though the rest of the level has Shinbei navigate the levels on foot. Bosses are encountered in several levels, but not every level. The Japanese version has the player die when hit, but the international version gives the player three hit points for a lower difficulty.
