= Stellar Adventure =

1980 video game

- Developer: Stephen Flitman
- Publisher: Software Innovations
- Platform: TRS-80
- Release: 1980

Stellar Adventure is a 1980 video game published by Software Innovations for the TRS-80.

== Contents ==
Stellar Adventure is a game in which the player earns points by discovering artifacts on planets, and in space battles against Kyraxian fighters and dreadnoughts.

== Reception ==
Jon Mishcon reviewed Stellar Adventure in The Space Gamer No. 39. Mishcon commented that "For the price I feel this is a good buy. Certainly you will enjoy the first few hours of play. In its present state, I don't believe I'd call it a classic."
