= Dacholer =

1983 video game

- Arcade flyer
- Developer: Nichibutsu
- Publisher: Nichibutsu
- Platform: Arcade
- Release: JP: October 1983; NA: November 1983
- Genre: Action
- Modes: Single-player, multiplayer

Dacholer (Note: Japanese: ダチョラー, Hepburn: Dachorā) is a 1983 action video game developed and published by Nichibutsu for arcades. It was released in Japan in October 1983 and in North America in November 1983. A separate version with a human protagonist titled Kick Boy was released around the same time. Hamster Corporation released the game as part of their Arcade Archives series for the Nintendo Switch and PlayStation 4 in September 2025, as well as their Arcade Archives 2 series for the Nintendo Switch 2, PlayStation 5, Xbox Series X/S and Windows in September 2026.

== Gameplay ==
The player controls an ostrich or human boy who must defeat a plethora of enemy animals by kicking turtles or soccer balls into them. The player has no form of defense if no turtle/ball is nearby and dies in one hit. The turtles can rebound from walls and also move to kill the player. Items can be collected to receive bonus points. Enemies can be defeated early and prevented from spawning by the player stepping on the craters they emerge from. Bridges over water allow the player to pass through it, but a kappa or boat may pass by and kill the player. Levels end when all enemies are defeated.
