= Itazura Tenshi =

1984 video game

- Arcade flyer
- Developer: Alice
- Publisher: Nichibutsu
- Platform: Arcade
- Release: JP: November 1984
- Genre: Multidirectional shooter
- Modes: Single-player, multiplayer

Itazura Tenshi (Note: Japanese: 悪戯天使, Hepburn: Itazura Tenshi) is a 1984 multidirectional shooter video game developed by Alice and published by Nichibutsu for arcades. It was only released in Japan in November 1984. Hamster Corporation acquired the game's rights alongside Nichibutsu's portfolio, releasing the game outside Japan for the first time as part of their Arcade Archives series for the Nintendo Switch and PlayStation 4 in November 2022.

== Gameplay ==
The player controls an angel who must connect various constellations by flying into stars in the night sky, while fending off enemies with arrows. Completing each constellation gives extra points depending on their size, with a set number of constellations in each stage. In the end of each stage, the angel has to reunite Ran and Lum in the manner of Altair and Vega, which grants more points when successful.
