= Moon Shuttle =

1981 video game

- North American arcade flyer
- Developer: Nichibutsu
- Publishers: JP: Nichibutsu; NA: Taito
- Platforms: Arcade, Atari 8-bit computers, Commodore 64, TRS-80 Color Computer
- Release: JP: June 1981; NA: August 1981
- Genre: Scrolling shooter
- Modes: Single-player, multiplayer

Moon Shuttle (Note: Japanese: ムーンシャトル, Hepburn: Mūn Shatoru) is a 1981 horizontally scrolling shooter video game developed and published by Nichibutsu for arcades. It was released in Japan in June 1981 and in North America in August 1981 by Taito. It was later ported to home computers by Datasoft. Hamster Corporation acquired the rights to the game alongside Nichibutsu's catalogue, releasing the game as part of their Arcade Archives series for the Nintendo Switch and PlayStation 4 in October 2024, as well as their Arcade Archives 2 series for the Nintendo Switch 2, PlayStation 5, Xbox Series X/S and Windows in June 2026.

== Gameplay ==
The player controls a spaceship who must navigate between an asteroid belt in one phase and shoot aliens in the next. The spaceship has to avoid the asteroids at all costs and make their way through narrow gaps which they can form by shooting the asteroids. The player can accelerate through the gaps and risk crashing for bonus points, or simply allow the spaceship to cruise slowly. In the second phase, aliens move in erratic patterns and must be defeated; each wave has different enemies until a boss enemy is found and defeated.

== Reception ==
Robert Karp of Play Meter praised the graphics and the meteorite section's originality, but criticized the game's use of a lever for acceleration.

Craig Holyoak of ComputerFun gave the Atari 8-bit version a 2/4 score, criticizing its lack of innovation as well as questioning Datasoft's intentions of developing the port.
