= Terra Cresta 3D =

1997 video game

- Developer: Nichibutsu
- Publisher: Nichibutsu
- Director: Tacanoli Tanaca
- Series: Cresta Series
- Platform: Sega Saturn
- Release: JP: August 8, 1997
- Genre: Scrolling shooter
- Mode: Single-player

Terra Cresta 3D (Note: Japanese: テラクレスタ3D, Hepburn: Tera Kuresuta Surī Dī) is a 1997 vertically scrolling shooter video game developed and published by Nichibutsu for the Sega Saturn. It is the fourth game in the Cresta series, following the 1992 game Terra Cresta II: Mandler's Counterattack for the PC Engine. The player assumes control of three starships as they must complete six stages while destroying enemies and avoiding collision with them and their projectiles. By collecting small "F" icons, the player can merge the three ships into one and gain access to new, more destructive weapons.

3D is the second entry in the series to have no involvement with creator Shigeki Fujiwara, who several years prior departed from Nichibutsu to work on the Bomberman series for Hudson Soft. This left the company struggling to produce any successful action-oriented titles, shifting focus towards pornographic mahjong arcade games instead. Terra Cresta 3D was negatively received for its gameplay, level design, and inferiority to similar titles on the platform, though its graphics and soundtrack were praised by some. It is one of Nichibutsu's final games, as they ceased their video game operations in the early 2000s.

== Gameplay ==
In-game screenshot

Terra Cresta 3D is a vertical-scrolling shooter video game. Assuming the role of three different starships — the Winger, Gamma and Beta — the player is tasked with completing six stages by destroying enemies and avoiding collision with them and their projectiles. The Gamma gives the player a tailgun that can fire forwards and backwards, and the Beta doubles the firepower. These ships can be found by destroying small bases located throughout stages.

By collecting small "F" icons from defeating enemies, the player can combine all three ships into one for increased power. Combining with one other ship gives the Winger a wave beam, and combining with two provides the Winger with heat-seeking lasers that automatically lock onto enemies. The player can also launch a powerful bomb in the form of a flaming phoenix that glides across the screen. Stages end with a boss that must be defeated to progress. By performing a button combination on the main menu, the player can access a cheat giving them 99 lives at the beginning of the game.

== Development and release ==
Terra Cresta 3D was released in Japan by Nichibutsu for the Sega Saturn on August 8, 1997. It is the second Terra Cresta game to not have any involvement with series creator Shigeki Fujiwara, as several years prior he left Nichibutsu to work on the Bomberman series for Hudson Soft. Described as "the heart and soul of the company" by Hardcore Gaming 101, his departure left Nichibutsu struggling to produce any successful action-oriented games, instead releasing a number of pornographic mahjong arcade titles throughout the late 1990s. Terra Cresta 3D is one of the company's last video games alongside titles such as Battle Round USA, as they suspended their operations in the early 2000s.

== Reception ==
Reception

Review scores
Publication	Score
Famitsu	19/40
Next Generation	1/5

Famitsu was negative towards the slow pace and inferiority to similar titles available on the Saturn, believing the core gameplay of Terra Cresta was unsuitable for a 3D shooting game. GameFan expressed an indifferent response towards its slow pace and low difficulty level, although they liked its polygonal graphics and soundtrack. They compared it unfavorably to Namco's Xevious 3D/G. Next Generation magazine was especially critical towards the game, finding its 3D visuals "pathetic" and its level designs "of the lowest-common-denominator, cookie-cutter, purple-blotchy-copy-of-every-other-shooter-known-to-humankind variety". They especially disliked its usage of polygons due to them causing slow down, and found the game to be a disappointment compared to the original Moon Cresta and Terra Cresta. Next Generation suggested that players instead wait for Raizing's Terra Diver or Taito's RayStorm. SuperGamesPower liked the idea of combining the player's ships together to form a much more powerful one, comparing it to arcade titles such as Galaxian and Xevious.

In a 2016 retrospective review, Jess Ragan of Hardcore Gaming 101 called it a "disconcertingly watered down sequel" to the original Terra Cresta, disliking its graphics, transparency effects, camera angle and overall gameplay for being inferior to other shooters on the Saturn and to earlier titles in the series. The departure of series creator Shigeki Fujiwara was cited by Ragan as a reason for the sudden downturn in quality compared to earlier entries, as well as the overall state of the video game industry at the time and impending dominance of 3D graphics. He felt that it was "a miracle" the game was even made due to Nichibutsu mainly devoting their video game operations towards pornographic mahjong arcade games towards the late 1990s. Ragan also praised the soundtrack for its usage of orchestral remixes of tracks from the original, saying that had Nichibutsu put the same amount of effort into the game as they did with the music it "could have been something special".
