= Tube Panic =

1984 video game

- Arcade flyer
- Developer: Fujitek
- Publisher: Nichibutsu
- Platform: Arcade
- Release: JP: January 1984; NA: September 1984
- Genre: Tube shooter
- Modes: Single-player, multiplayer

Tube Panic (Note: Japanese: チューブパニック, Hepburn: Chūbu Panikku) is a 1984 tube shooter video game developed by Fujitek and published by Nichibutsu for arcades. It was released in Japan in January 1984 and North America in September 1984. Hamster Corporation acquired the game's rights alongside Nichibutsu's intellectual property; they released the game as part of their Arcade Archives series for the Nintendo Switch in April 2020 and PlayStation 4 the following month.

== Gameplay ==
Tube Panic is a tube shooter similar in style to Atari's Tempest (1981). In the game, the player controls a spaceship named Marcus who must navigate and escape a tube-like liminal space in outer space. However, unlike Tempest, levels are set in fully three-dimensional areas, allowing for varied placements of enemies unbeforeseen in the genre. Levels set in a horizontally scrolling space also appear in the game. The game ends when Marcus rejoins the mother ship or loses all his lives.
