= My Vision =

Japanese Video Game System From 1983

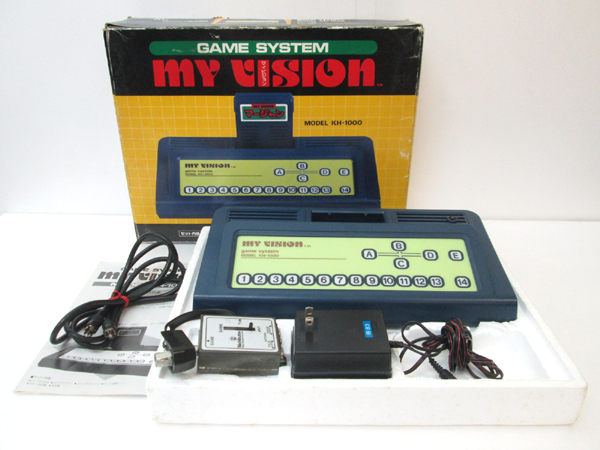
- Developer: Nichibutsu
- Type: Home video game console
- Generation: Third generation
- Released: JP: 1983
- Media: ROM Cartridge

The My Vision (Japanese: マイビジョン, Hepburn: Mai bijon) is a home video game console developed by Nichibutsu and released in Japan in 1983. The system was dedicated solely to playing video versions of popular board games. Players use a keyboard on the front of the console to input their actions.

== Games ==
At least six games were released for the system, each being sold for 4,500 yen.

- Gomokunarabe (Go), Renju (五目ならべ 連珠) - Nichibutsu
- Hanafuda (ハナフダ) - Logitec
- Mahjong (マージャン) - Nichibutsu
- Mastermind (マスターマインド) - Logitec
- Reversi (リバーシ) - Logitec
- Tsumeshogi (ツメショウギ) - Logitec
