= Expert (video game) =

1996 video game

- Cover art
- Developer: Nichibutsu
- Publisher: Nihon Bussan
- Platform: PlayStation
- Release: JP: May 31, 1996
- Genre: First-person shooter
- Mode: Single-player

Expert (Note: Japanese: エキスパート, Hepburn: Ekisupāto) is a 1996 first-person shooter video game developed by Nichibutsu for the PlayStation. The game is about a SWAT team-like group called "Expert" who try take back a government building that has been taken over by terrorists.

The game was one of the many first-person shooters (FPS) games designed in Japan and one of the few designed initially for the PlayStation. It was released in Japan on May 31, 1996. On its release reviews in Famicom Tsūshin Fun Generation and Game Power commented on the low quality graphics and awkward controls of the game.

== Gameplay ==
Expert is a first-person shooter (FPS) game. The game is set in Tokyo, Japan in the near future. In the game, the player takes control of a person who is a member of EXPERT, a SWAT team that must clear out a government building that has been taken over by terrorists.

The bottom of the screen contains information about the player's current weapon in use, remaining ammunition and the amount of health the player has.

Before each level, the player chooses what weapons to take into the level. This provides them with weapons such as shotguns and grenade launchers. The game is split into different levels that consist of navigating corridors and shooting at a variety of enemies. After being defeated, some enemies drop health pick-ups or ammo. The player must also dodge other traps such as motion-activated explosives in the walls.

Levels also feature seeking out key cards that allow access to certain doors. The goal is to make it to an elevator to access the next stage. Some levels in the game feature extras tasks such as rescuing hostages, defusing bombs, or taking on a more senior terrorist group member.

== Development and release ==
Expert was developed by Nichibutsu. While there were several FPS games that were made in Japan in the 1990s, Expert was one of the few that was released for the PlayStation. It was released just as FPS games were being released for consoles.

Expert was published by Nihon Bussan and released for the PlayStation on May 31, 1996 in Japan. It was bootlegged in various locations under the title Counter-Strike Ver. Expert to have it appear if it was part of the popular Counter-Strike series. This bootleg of the game is exactly the same as Expert, only with different cover art.

== Reception ==
Reception

Review scores
Publication	Score
Famitsu	6/10, 4/10, 6/10, 4/10
Dengeki PlayStation	75/100, 75/100
Fun Generation	3/10
Game Power	65/100

Reviewing the game in Famicom Tsūshin, three of the four reviewers found the controls awkward, particularly moving left and right while two reviewers said that the depth of field was too short, leading them to get hit from enemies across a room they didn't see. Two reviewers complimented the scenario and some locations such as the parking lot and hotel floors, while one reviewer said that despite the change of scenery in these levels, the strategy remains the same throughout the game. In Dengeki PlayStation, one reviewer said the difficulty in the game was high and that gunfights appear unassuming at first glance, but have tense moments such as defusing a bomb. A second reviewer said it had a stronger story than Doom and the variety of missions made it an addictive title. They were disappointed in the lack of radar for a map and the inability to pick up some items during gameplay.

From magazines that reviewed import titles from Japan, the reviewers in Fun Generation and Game Power critiqued the graphics. The reviewer in Game Power found that even though Expert did not feature elaborate textures or excessive polygons, when the screen had a couple of opponents, the game instantly slowed down the control but not the pace of other characters such as enemies in the game. The reviewer in Super Fun said that if there were an award for worst graphics in a game, Expert would be a strong contender, saying that the game stuttered continuously. Both Fun Generation and Game Power the only PlayStation console games in the style of Doom (1993) that were of any sort of quality on the system so far were Doom (1995) and Alien Trilogy (1996).

From a retrospective review, a reviewer in Hardcore Gaming 101 said the game featured flat and sometimes repetitive stage designs while also having a decent amount of cutscenes that play between and sometimes during levels accompanied by well-drawn artwork and fitting music. The reviewer commented that the graphics have well animated enemy sprites, but the flickering room graphics and slow framerate made Expert look worse than it actually is.

== See also ==
- List of first-person shooters
- Video games in Japan
