= Kid's Horehore Daisakusen =

1987 video game

- Japanese arcade flyer
- Developer: Nichibutsu
- Publisher: Nichibitsu
- Composer: Kenji Yoshida
- Platforms: Arcade, Family Computer, TurboGrafx-16
- Release: Arcade: JP: April 1987; Famicom: JP: July 10, 1987; TurboGrafx-16: JP: October 31, 1989; NA: April 1990
- Genre: Action
- Mode: Single-player

Kid's Horehore Daisakusen (Note: Japanese: キッドのホレホレ大作戦, Hepburn: Kid no Hore Hore Daisakusen) is a 1987 action video game developed and published by Nichibutsu for arcades. A port for the Family Computer was released under the name Booby Kids (Note: Japanese: ブービーキッズ, Hepburn: Būbī Kizzu). A port to the TurboGrafx-16 developed by Hudson Soft was released as Cratermaze, which was released outside Japan unlike the other versions.

A sequel named Booby Boys was released by Nichibutsu for the Game Boy in 1993.

== Gameplay ==
Gameplay of the game's first world.

Booby Kids is a game played from an overhead perspective, with the player taking on the role of one of the titular Booby Kids, named for their ability to instantly dig booby traps in front of where they stand and bury hostile enemies that attempt to seek out and ultimately destroy the Booby Kids. Compared to Kid no Hore Hore Daisakusen, the levels in Booby Kids feature more of a reliance on puzzle-solving in addition to the maze like structures of the original game.

Levels range from the conventional prehistory setting of the first four levels to feudal Japan and even some futuristic levels inspired by science fiction. There are 21 levels in this game with five different bonus levels to gain extra points in. Objects to acquire in the other time zones include coconuts (in the prehistoric era), ancient Japanese scrolls (in feudal Japan), radios (in the World War II era), bags of money (in the modern era), and computer monitors (retrieved in the future era).

== Re-releases ==
A port for the Family Computer was released under the name Booby Kids (Note: Japanese: ブービーキッズ, Hepburn: Būbī Kizzu). A port to the PC Engine developed by Hudson Soft was released as Doraemon: Meikyū Daisakusen (Note: Japanese: ドラえもん 迷宮大作戦(めいきゅうだいさくせん), Hepburn: Doraemon: Meikyū Daisakusen) in Japan, where Doraemon and other characters from the manga series replaces that of the original; the game was released for the TurboGrafx-16 as Cratermaze in North America with the original character designs intact.
