= Exerizer =

1987 video game

- North American arcade flyer
- Developer: Jaleco
- Publishers: WW: Jaleco; NA: Nichibutsu
- Platform: Arcade
- Release: JP: March 1987; NA: 1987
- Genre: Fixed shooter
- Modes: Single-player, multiplayer

Exerizer (Note: Japanese: エクセライザー, Hepburn: Ekuseraizā) is a fixed shooter developed and published by Jaleco as an arcade video game. It was released in Japan in March 1987 and in North America by Nichibutsu as Sky Fox the same year. It is an indirect follow-up to Jaleco's 1983's Exerion and 1984's Exerion II: Zorni. The game was mostly well-received by Western game critics, albeit some criticized it for its depiction of women.

== Gameplay ==
The game is a fixed shooter in the style of Galaga and Phoenix, but with eight-way movement across the screen and parallax scrolling for the starry backgrounds. At the player's disposal to fight the approaching enemies, some of them made in pseudo-depth 2.5D graphics with scaled sprites, is a small space fighter capable of firing two types of projectiles: the unlimited but slow rockets and the fast laser shots that are limited by draining the ship's power. The power can be refilled, and the ship itself upgraded, through collecting the power-ups that appear after destroying certain enemies.

The game can be played by up to two players in alternating turns. Similar as in Gorf, it features several different types of waves (stages). For instance, one stage features space witches saddle-perched on either serpentine Chinese dragons or Western-style winged dragons: the dragons must to be hit repeatedly in the weak point of their heads to be killed, after which the riders themselves can be shot for a score bonus. The player progresses through most of them by either destroying all the enemies (resulting in the score bonus and power-up awards) or alternatively just surviving their attacks for a long enough time.

== Reception ==
The game has been received mostly positively upon its release. In Japan, Game Machine listed Sky Fox on their April 1, 1987 issue as being the twelfth most-successful table arcade unit of the month. The Italian edition of Zzap! called it a treat "for those who love the space shooter genre, ensuring a good fun for a sufficient period of time." A review by Clare Edgeley of Computer and Video Games called it "a weird mish-mash of ideas from best-sellers of the past - the dragons have been borrowed from Space Harrier, and there are many scenes reminiscent of that golden oldie, Space Invaders." She complemented its colorful graphics and verdicted that "the game does offer a fast and relatively addictive shoot 'em up."

Commodore User, however, refused to even score this "slickly-executed" but "otherwise boring game", accusing its "warped idot [sic]" creators of promoting sexual assault due to in their opinion "tasteless", "highly objectionable" and "offensive" stage featuring a group of female enemies who are only vulnerable when they open up their cloaks "and expose their sparsely-clad bodies in the spreadeagle position. The method of dispatching them is to score a direct hit between their splayed legs." The reviewer described it as an act to "humiliate and belittle women in the most violent, degrading way, by subjecting them to sexual violence," and implied this "cheap 'n' nasty" game's "presence in arcades" to be "dangerous" for British society. Sinclair User arcade section remembered it as a "sexist shoot'em up".

According to a retrospective review in Retro Gamer, when compared to much of Jaleco's other arcade titles, Sky Fox "can be seen as a bit of diamond in the rough, as it's a nicely presented little-known vertical shooter that plays like a mixture of Galaxian and Space Harrier." The reviewer felt the game's need of "banking and consideration to attacking enemies is a neat mechanic, which, coupled with Sky Fox's nice visuals and humorous enemy designs (bikini-clad dragon riders in space manage to be more off-the-wall than Space Harrier's enemies), makes it an enjoyable little shooter," and recommended Cave's Espgaluda II as a "converted alternative".

== See also ==
- Salamander, another 1980s arcade shooter featuring serpents in space.
