= Puzzle'n Desu! =

1995 puzzle video game

Puzzle'N Desu!
- Developer(s): Nichibutsu
- Publisher(s): Nichibutsu
- Platform(s): Super Famicom
- Release: JP: April 14, 1995
- Genre(s): Puzzle
- Mode(s): Single-player, multiplayer

Puzzle'n Desu! (Note: Japanese: ぱずるんでス！, Hepburn: Pazurun Desu!; lit. It's a Puzzle!) is a puzzle video game released by Nichibutsu for the Super Famicom on April 14, 1995. It stars an unnamed gnome who has to push boxes.

== Gameplay ==
Screenshot of the first stage, showing the unnamed gnome and the boxes.

The main objective of the game is to push boxes to make a group of 3 boxes. Once the group is made, the boxes will pop out. When all the boxes disappear, the game moves onto the next stage. If a player makes any mistakes, they can press L+R that plays a jingle and the screen will fade to white before resetting the stage.

The game supports up to four players via the Super Multitap accessory from Hudson Soft. All the players are colored differently. Multiplayer mode allows you to choose one of the stages in the game.

The game also features a stage builder which allows the player to make their own stage and test it.

The game even features a sound test as well as a settings menu in which the player can either listen to music, sounds, or change the options.
