= Cosmo Police Galivan =

1985 video game

- Arcade flyer
- Developer: Nichibutsu
- Publisher: Nichibutsu
- Director: Shigeki Fujiwara
- Designer: Nakagawa Kyoko
- Platforms: Arcade, Famicom, Commodore 64, Amstrad CPC, ZX Spectrum
- Release: December 1985
- Genre: Platform
- Mode: Single-player

Cosmo Police Galivan (Note: Japanese: コスモポリス ギャリバン, Hepburn: Kosumoporisu Gyariban) is a 1985 platform video game developed and published by Nichibutsu for arcades. The game is a homage to the Japanese tokusatsu shows Space Sheriff Gavan and Space Sheriff Sharivan. It was later ported to Commodore 64, Amstrad CPC, ZX Spectrum, and Famicom. The game spawned a sequel for the Super Nintendo Entertainment System called, Cosmo Police Galivan II: Arrow of Justice. Hamster Corporation acquired the rights to the game alongside Nichibutsu's intellectual property; the company released the game as part of the Arcade Archives series for the PlayStation 4 in 2015 and Nintendo Switch in 2021.

In 2022, the game was released as an in-built game on the Sega Astro City Mini V.

== Gameplay ==
In the game, the player takes the role of the last remaining member of the Cosmo Police, who runs and jumps around a multi-directional scrolling environment on planet Cynep, with caves, baroque rooms and underwater zones, destroying or avoiding waves of constantly attacking robots, aliens and alien ships.

The player starts the game as an unarmed human, whose only attacking options are kicking and punching, but picking up a POW item encases the human in a robotic suit and arms the player with a laser gun. Collecting the blue POW items while in the suit awards the player with a powerful beam weapon for a limited time, while the red POW item gives the player a three-shot cannon. POW items are dotted throughout the levels and can also be gained by shooting the blue robot aliens.

The player's character has an energy bar that decreases whenever the player is hit. Should this fall below the halfway point, the robot suit will be lost and the player will once again be an unarmed human. Collecting a POW item while in human form will restore the player's energy. If a POW is collected while wearing the suit, however, the player's energy will NOT be increased but their weapon will receive a power-up. The game's platforms are littered with springboards that fire the player high into the air when stepped on. Some platforms - often containing POW items - can only be reached via a springboard.

At the end of every level, the player has to defeat a boss. There are two levels which alternate endlessly.

== Reception ==
In Japan, Game Machine listed Galivan on their January 15, 1986 issue as being the tenth most-successful table arcade unit at the time.
