= Artelius =

1987 video game

- Cover art
- Developer: Nichibutsu
- Publisher: Nichibutsu
- Producer: Hiroshi Kitabata
- Artists: Yuichi Watanabe; Motoko Ojiri
- Platform: Family Computer
- Release: JP: November 13, 1987
- Genre: Action role-playing
- Mode: Single-player

Artelius (アルテリオス) is an action role-playing video game developed and published by Nichibutsu for the Family Computer exclusively in Japan on November 13, 1987.

== Story ==
An advanced civilization once flourished in a fictional solar system. One day, a black hole appeared and sucked everyone who lived there into another dimension. This parallel universe came to be known as Artelius. Ruled by the diabolical king Sarbelor, he controls a machine that has split the universe into spaces filled with asteroid belts.

A cyborg has been built by a scientist named Dr. Rado in order to defeat Sarbelor; only he has been entrusted with this mission to save Artelius from the evil king's reign.

== Gameplay ==
Players begin the game by customizing and modifying the traits of their characters. Warp points allow players to travel across the universe. On the map, the red dots are always bad guys while the blue dots indicate space colonies, where players can rest and stock up on supplies. Each resting spot has at least two doors or a warp point. Battles are done randomly and from a first-person perspective. Winning will earn the player valuable experience points that will make the player stronger and advance in levels.

The players attacks are determined by strength while their defensive power is determined by the strength of the shield. Having a high level of agility allows for more frequent successes in running away from unwanted battles. The laser beam is the best weapon in the game; it can eventually be upgraded to a "hyper magnum" gun that is stronger than a fully powered-up missile or bazooka weapon.
