= Ray-Thunder =

- Box art
- Publisher: Nichibutsu
- Platform: Game Boy
- Release: JP: February 8, 1991
- Genre: First-person shooter
- Modes: Single-player, multiplayer

Ray-Thunder (Note: Japanese: ライサンダー, Hepburn: Raisandā) is a 1991 3D shooter game published by Nichibutsu for the Game Boy. The game is set in the future, where security robots have gone berserk and begin attacking people in Tokyo, which leads the player to choose a craft to track them down in various mazes.

Ray-Thunder was Nichibutsu's first Game Boy video game. It was released for the Game Boy in Japan on February 8, 1991. It received mixed reviews in Famicom Tsūshin with comments being split on its visuals and gameplay.

== Plot and gameplay ==
In the near future, a central intelligence computer goes out of control, leading security robots to attack people in Tokyo. The game is set in various 3D labyrinths that the player must navigate, and the player must destroy other robots.

Ray-Thunder is a 3D shooter game. The player is in a 3D dungeon where they explore for items while shooting enemies. The player first chooses between different vehicles with different attributes, such as one that has a focus on speed and another that has greater attack power, but moves more slowly. The game features 20 stages.

The game can also be played in a two-player versus mode.

== Release and reception ==
Reception

Review scores
Publication	Score
Famitsu	5/10, 7/10, 7/10, 3/10
Hippon Super!	8/10

Ray-Thunder was released in Japan for the Game Boy on February 8, 1991.

Famicom Tsūshin magazine had four reviewers comment on the game. Some reviewers complimented the 3D effect the game had, with reviewers in Famicom Tsūshin complimenting the smooth transitions when turning left and right. Alternatively, one reviewer in the magazine found its mostly white background overtly bland. A reviewer in the magazine Hippon Super! wrote that while the line-drawn dungeons lack depth in the visuals, the sudden gunfights are exciting.

Two reviewers in Famicom Tsūshin found the gameplay to be weak in Ray-Thunder. Reviewers commented that the gameplay resembled older PC games or and could get monotonous or that the enemies in the game were not challenging enough. While one reviewer found it exciting in terms that an enemy could creep around a corner at any minute, two others said it became more exciting in versus mode, where it resembled a game of tag.

In a retrospective review in the Perfect Guide of Nostalgic Game Boy, a reviewer said the main appeal of the game was its 3D gameplay, which featured smooth animated graphics when changing angles. They commented that others may find it dull due to its overtly simple graphics and weak enemies.

== See also ==
- List of Game Boy games
