= Magical Speed =

1994 video game

- Developer: Allumer
- Publisher: Namco
- Platform: Arcade
- Release: JP: June 1994
- Genre: Card
- Modes: Single-player, multiplayer

Magical Speed (Note: Japanese: まじかるスピード, Hepburn: Majikaru Supīdo) is a 1994 card video game developed by Allumer and published by Namco for arcades. It was released only in Japan in June 1994. It is a variant of the card game Speed. Hamster Corporation acquired the game's rights alongside Allumer's catalogue, releasing the game as part of their Arcade Archives series for the Nintendo Switch and PlayStation 4 in February 2023.

== Gameplay ==
The game follows Nicole and Claire, who travel around a fantasy world to find the legendary Rainbow Card. They battle various mystical beings by playing Speed and defeating them in the game. A story mode and versus mode between two players are available.
