= Tatakae! Big Fighter =

1989 video game

- Arcade flyer
- Developer: Nichibutsu
- Publisher: Nichibutsu
- Platform: Arcade
- Release: JP: July 1989; NA: 1989
- Genre: Multidirectional shooter
- Modes: Single-player, multiplayer

Tatakae! Big Fighter (Note: Japanese: 戦え!ビッグファイター, Hepburn: Tatakae ! Biggu Faitā), also known as Sky Robo in North America, is a 1989 multidirectional shooter video game developed and published by Nichibutsu for arcades. It was first released in Japan in July 1989, later in the United States that same year.

Hamster Corporation acquired the game's rights alongside Nichibutsu's catalogue, releasing the game as part of their Arcade Archives series for the Nintendo Switch and PlayStation 4 in April 2025, as well as their Arcade Archives 2 series for the Nintendo Switch 2, PlayStation 5, Xbox Series X/S and Windows in May 2026.

== Gameplay ==
The player controls a spaceship which navigates multiple levels and defeats enemies. While the default spaceship uses typical horizontally scrolling shooter gameplay, it can be transformed into a robot which can shoot in all directions but is considerably less agile. Players must switch between both modes to navigate the levels and defeat a plethora of enemies. considerably Power-ups are available that improve the player's ammunition. Boss characters must be defeated at the end of each level to progress.
