= Terra Cresta II: Mandler's Counterattack =

1992 video game

- Developer: Make Software
- Publisher: Nichibutsu
- Director: Hiroaki Kawamoto
- Composers: Akihiro Akamatsu; Sachiko Oita
- Series: Cresta Series
- Platform: PC Engine
- Release: JP: November 27, 1992
- Genre: Scrolling shooter
- Mode: Single-player

Terra Cresta II: Mandler's Counterattack (Note: Japanese: テラクレスタII マンドラーの逆襲, Hepburn: Tera Kuresuta II Mandorā no Gyakushū) is a vertically scrolling shooter video game developed by Make Software and published by Nichibutsu for the PC Engine console. It is the third installment in the Cresta series and a sequel to the 1985 arcade game Terra Cresta. It was released only in Japan, on November 27, 1992.

Similar to its predecessor, the player controls a flying craft to destroy the Mandler army before they destroy all of humanity. Gameplay involves shooting enemies and collecting different ship parts that each provide their own unique weapon.

== Gameplay ==
Like in the previous installment, the player controls the fighter craft, now dubbed "Wing Galibur II", and must shoot down incoming enemy craft in the air and on the ground. The game uses the same powerup system as the former game, but the powerups and ship parts are now obtained through flying capsules. Once the player has shot all of them down, the game awards the player with a piece that attaches onto the ship. Four different pieces are available to give the Wing Galibur II extra firepower and wider shots. They also act as shields, giving the player extra hits before they die. Should the player add all pieces to the ship and press the "transform" button, the Wing Galibur will transform into an invulnerable flaming phoenix for a brief period of time. Additionally, the player can press the transform button without all pieces to cause the pieces to split from the ship and move into a triangular shape around the player. While separated, the pieces are invulnerable to all enemy fire, while the main ship is not. If the player is hit while separated, the Wing Galibur will revert to a singular craft.

Improvements on the core gameplay are implemented into the sequel such as the formation edit feature first seen in the Nintendo Entertainment System release of Terra Cresta and a Caravan Mode seen in some of Hudson Soft's shooting games on the system.

== Reception ==
Reception

Review scores
Publication	Score
Famitsu	21/40
Gekkan PC Engine	69/100
PC Engine FAN	20.30/30
MaruSho PC Engine	21/40

Japanese gaming magazine Famitsu give the game a rating of 21/40.

Hardcore Gaming 101 stated that "Terra Cresta II: Mandler Strikes Back is a competent shooter. It doesn't compare to the original Terra Cresta…or Blazing Lazers…or Gate of Thunder…or, uh, Air Zonk…but it gets the job done."
