= MagMax =

1985 video game

Magmax
- Arcade flyer
- Developer: Nichibutsu (Note: Amstrad CPC, Commodore 64, and ZX Spectrum versions developed by Ocean Software.)
- Publishers: Nichibutsu: NES; JP: Nichibutsu; NA: FCI C64, CPC, ZX Spectrum Imagine Software
- Platforms: Arcade, NES, Amstrad CPC, Commodore 64, ZX Spectrum
- Release: Arcade: JP: March 1985; NA: May 1985; NES: JP: March 19, 1986; NA: October 1988; C64, CPC, ZX Spectrum: EU: 1987
- Genre: Scrolling shooter
- Mode: Single-player

MagMax (Note: Japanese: マグマックス, Hepburn: Magumakkusu) is a 1985 horizontally scrolling shooter video game developed and published by Nichibutsu for arcades. It was ported to the Nintendo Entertainment System, released in Japan on March 19, 1986, and by FCI in North America in October 1988. The game was also ported to the Commodore 64, ZX Spectrum, and Amstrad CPC by Ocean Software and released on their Imagine label in 1987.

The three-headed mechanical dragon found as a boss character in the game, known as Babylon, strongly resembles Mecha-King Ghidorah from the Godzilla franchise. Hamster Corporation acquired the rights to the game alongside Nichibutsu's intellectual property, and released the game as part of their Arcade Archives series for the PlayStation 4 in 2015 and the Nintendo Switch in 2020, as well as the NES version for their Console Archives series for the Nintendo Switch 2 and PlayStation 5 in May 2026.

== Gameplay ==
Players control the titular spaceship in an attempt to completely construct the ship into a giant robot and to destroy any enemies attempting to stop it. The ship must avoid various obstacles while shooting enemies on a 3D field. After a successful transformation into the robot, the ship gains increased mobility, while the gameplay becomes that of a typical horizontal scrolling shooter.

== Reception ==
Reception

Award
Publication	Award
Amstrad Action	Mastergame

In Japan, Game Machine listed MagMax as the second most successful table arcade unit of April 1985.
