= Nichibutsu =

Japanese video game developer and publisher

Nihon Bussan Co. Ltd. 日本物産株式会社
- Trade name: Nichibutsu
- Native name: 日本物産株式会社
- Romanized name: Nihon Bussan Kabushiki Gaisha
- Type: Public
- Industry: Video game industry
- Founded: October 1970; 56 years ago
- Founder: Sueharu Torii
- Defunct: December 15, 2015; 10 years ago
- Fate: Dissolved; intellectual properties sold to Hamster Corporation.
- Headquarters: Kita, Osaka, Japan
- Area served: Worldwide
- Key people: Sueharu Torii; (president and CEO); Kazuo Torii; (executive director)
- Products: Video games; Arcade cabinets; Slot machines; Yachts
- Number of employees: 30

Nihon Bussan Co. Ltd., (Note: Japanese: 日本物産株式会社, Hepburn: Nihon Bussan Kabushiki Gaisha; lit. "Japanese Products Co. Ltd.") doing business as Nichibutsu, (Note: Japanese: 日物) was a Japanese video game developer and publisher headquartered in Kita, Osaka. In the past they had also manufactured and sold yachts.

The company used a horned owl for its official logo. Outside of the Nichibutsu brand, the company also produces adult video games (mainly strip mahjong arcade games) under the Sphinx (Note: スフィンクス, Sufinkusu) brand.

In March 2014, Nichibutsu sold its video game library to Hamster Corporation due to the decision of original founder Sueharu Torii to retire. The company was disbanded on December 15, 2015.

== History ==
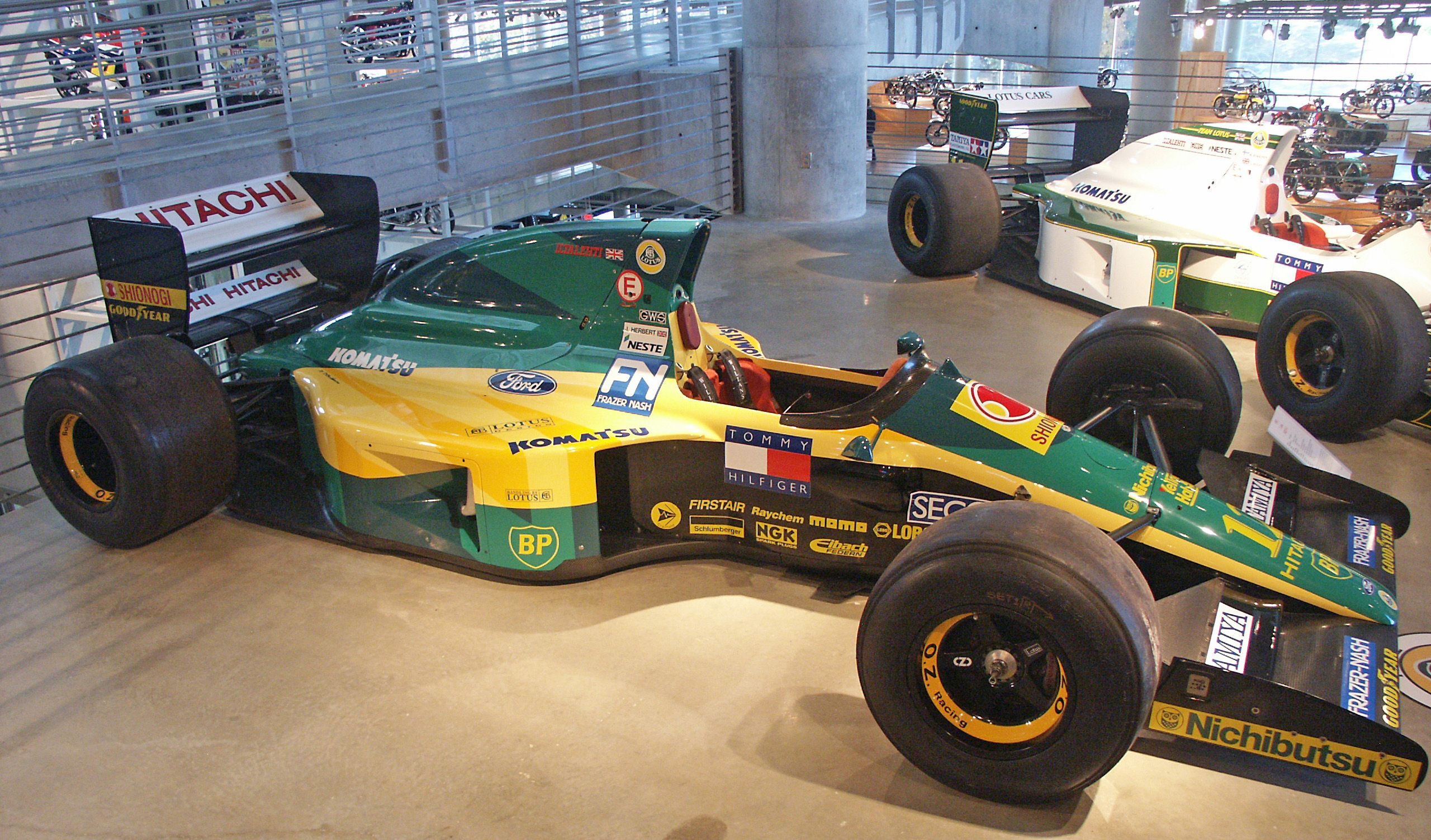
Nichibutsu sponsored the Lotus F1 team from 1991 to 1993; pictured is the Lotus 102D bearing their logo.

The company's founder Sueharu Torii established Nihon Bussan in October 1970 in Kita-ku, Osaka. They begin their activities by mainly selling arcade machines. In 1972, the company was incorporated as Nihon Bussan Co., Ltd with a capital of 3 million yen.

In 1976, Nihon Bussan, under the trade name Nichibutsu, made its debut as a manufacturer to the Amusement Machine Show and opened a Tokyo office in 1978. 1978 also saw Nichibutsu entering the arcade game market, when they debuted with a clone of the game Breakout called Table Attacker. The same year, Nichibutsu settled with Taito by paying a license fee to launch a clone of Space Invaders titled Moon Base. Also in 1979, a business alliance was formed with Namco for a clone of Galaxian called Moon Alien. Originally intended as a limited release, Nichibutsu violated the manufacturing agreement by producing the title in more units than the agreement called for and ended up paying Namco the excess of the license fee. Nichibutsu continued to release successful titles such as Moon Cresta and Crazy Climber, which were programmed by Jorudan under contract.

In 1983, the company developed Jangou Night which features the industry's first undressing elements and established the genre of strip mahjong games. In 1984, Nihon Bussan developed Tube Panic, the industry's first board game equipped with a rotation feature. From the mid-1980s, Nichibutsu released Terra Cresta and Cosmo Police Galivan that made use of Yamaha YM3812 FM sound.

Nichibutsu entered the home video game market in 1983 by developing a console of their own, the My Vision, and in 1986 released their first NES title, MagMax, followed by the MSX in 1989; the same year also saw the release of the company's last mainstream arcade game, Sky Robo (Tatakae! Big Fighter in Japan) before switching to exclusively produce strip mahjong titles for that market; in 1992, the company left JAMMA after the arcade industry began showing concerns about increasingly risque material in their strip mahjong games. In 1990, Nihon Bussan released console-first titles for the PC Engine such as F1 Circus which became a major hit. During the height of the F1 Circus series, Nichibutsu sponsored Team Lotus from 1991 to 1993; the sponsorship agreement allowed Lotus to appear as the only licensed team in the F1 Circus titles until Nichibutsu obtained a complete license from Formula One Constructors Association.

Nichibutsu began releasing games for the Sega Genesis in 1991, Super Nintendo Entertainment System in 1992, PlayStation in 1995 and for the Sega Saturn in 1996. Some of the titles were mahjong titles, with their PC Engine game Sexy Idol Mahjong featuring strip elements from their arcade titles.

In March 2009, the company partnered with D4 Enterprise to distribute their portfolio for its Project EGG service.

In March 2014, Nichibutsu sold the rights of all video games to Hamster Corporation. Hamster had approached founder Sueharu Torii for a licensing agreement of Nihon Bussan's games. Torii opted instead to sell outright the company's video game library and to retire.

=== Timeline ===
- 1979 – The company's headquarters is relocated to Tenjinbashi, Kita-ku, Osaka. Their capital increases to 24 million yen. Nichibutsu U.S.A. Co., Ltd. is established in Torrance, California, US.
- 1980 – Nichibutsu U.K. Ltd. is established in West Midlands, England, United Kingdom. Nichibutsu Kyushu Co., Ltd. is established in Hakataekiminami, Hakata-ku, Fukuoka, Fukuoka.
- 1981 – Nichibutsu Europe GmbH is established in Rödermark, Offenbach, Hesse, Germany. The Nihon Bussan Co., Ltd. factory opens in Sayama, Kumiyama, Kuse, Kyoto.
- 1983 – Tokyo office is moved to Nihonbashihoridome, Chuo-ku, Tokyo. Nichibutsu Sapporo Co., Ltd. is established in Nakanoshima, Toyohira-ku, Sapporo, Hokkaido. Nichibutsu Sendai Co., Ltd. is established in Uesugi, Sendai, Miyagi. Nichibutsu Hiroshima Co., Ltd. is established in Higashikasumichou, Minami-ku, Hiroshima, Hiroshima. Nichibutsu also releases their only console, My Vision.
- 1984 – Capital increases to 36 million yen.
- 1985 – Capital increases to 50 million yen.
- 1989 – Nichibutsu's last mainstream arcade game, Sky Robo / Tatakae! Big Fighter, is released.
- 1991 – The company's Tokyo office is moved to Roppongi, Minato-ku, Tokyo.
- 1992 – Nichibutsu withdraws from the Japan Amusement Machinery Manufacturers Association over a dispute regarding the risque content in their mahjong games.
- 2001 – Nichibutsu's last home video game, Virtual Kyoutei 21, is released.
- 2005 – Nichibutsu's last arcade game (overall), Koi Suru Cosplay Akihabara is released.
- 2007 – The company ends development of video games, while continuing to oversee the rights to their games.
- 2009 – Nichibutsu joins D4 Enterprise's Project EGG, a retro game republishing/distribution service.
- 2014 – Nichibutsu sells their portfolio and trademark to Hamster Corporation and shuts down.

== List of Nichibutsu games ==
=== Paddle games ===
==== Breakout clones ====
- 1978 Table Attacker
- 1978 Table Attacker Guard
- 1978 Table Attacker Special
- 1978 Table Attacker Black
- 1979 Attacker Ace

==== Circus clones ====
- 1978 Table Bonpa
- 1979 Bonpa

=== Shooters ===
==== Moon Base series ====
Originally clones of Space Invaders.

- 1978 Moon Base
- 1978 Moon Base Spector
- 1978 Moon Base Zeta

==== Terra Cresta series ====
- 1980 Moon Cresta (co-developed with Jorudan)
- 1985 Terra Cresta
- 1986 UFO Robo Dangar
- 1987 Terra Force
- 1992 Terra Cresta II: Mandler's Counterattack
- 1997 Terra Cresta 3D

This series was followed by Sol Cresta in 2022, developed by another company, PlatinumGames.

==== Other shooter games ====
- 1980 Moon Alien (clone of Galaxian)
- 1980 Moon Alien 2
- 1980 Moon Alpha
- 1980 Moon Raker
- 1980 Moon Quasar
- 1981 Moon Shuttle
- 1982 Radical Radial
- 1984 Seicross (developed by Alice)
- 1984 Itazura Tenshi (developed by Alice)
- 1984 Tube Panic (developed by Fujitek)
- 1985 MagMax
- 1986 Soldier Girl Amazon
- 1986 Ninja Emaki
- 1987 Sky Fox (North America only; developed by Jaleco)
- 1987 Spinner-87 Legion
- 1988 Formation Armed F
- 1989 Tatakae! Big Fighter
- 1991 Ray-Thunder
- 1996 Expert

=== Action games ===
- 1979 Rolling Crash (co-developed with Jorudan)
- 1980 Crazy Climber (co-developed with Jorudan)
- 1981 Frisky Tom (co-developed with Jorudan)
- 1982 Wiping (co-developed with Jorudan)
- 1983 Dacholer
- 1983 Skelagon (SF-X)
- 1984 Roller Jammer (developed by Alice)
- 1984 Dynamic Ski
- 1985 Cop 01
- 1985 Cosmo Police Galivan
- 1986 Mighty Guy
- 1987 Kid's Horehore Daisakusen
- 1987 Samurai Assassin
- 1988 Crazy Climber 2
- 1990 Die Hard
- 1993 Cosmo Police Galivan II: Arrow of Justice
- 1996 Expert

=== Quiz games ===
- 1987 Hihoo!
- 1987 Hihoo!2
- 1991 Quiz DE Date
- 1991 Miracle Q
- 1991 Kotaemon kachi
- 1991 TECHNO・DOOL

=== Puzzle games ===
- 1988 Oh! Pyepee
- 1988 Tougenkyou
- 1989 Pairs
- 1995 Puzzle'n Desu!

=== Mahjong games ===
- 1983 Jangō Lady
- 1984 Night Gal (Japan's top-grossing table arcade cabinet of October 1984 and December 1984)
- 1986 Second Love
- 1990 Mahjong Triple Wars
- 1991 Mahjong Vanilla Syndrome
- 1994 Sailor Wars

=== Other games ===
- 1987 Artelius
- 1989 WCW Wrestling
- 1990 F1 Circus
- 1995 Kouryaku Casino Bar
