= Takeshi Yoshida =

Japanese engineer

- Born: Japan
- Occupations: Engineer, Executive

Takeshi Yoshida is chief engineer for the 2000 Toyota Corolla and a Senior Managing Director of Toyota Motor Corporation. In 2003, Yoshida was appointed as Managing Officer of the Lexus Development Center, to spearhead the luxury division's development of new platforms and technologies. In 2007, Yoshidaa was promoted from his Managing Officer position to Senior Managing Director on the Toyota board.
