= Frisky Tom =

1981 video game

- North American arcade flyer
- Developers: Nichibutsu; Jorudan
- Publisher: Nichibutsu
- Platforms: Arcade, Super Famicom, Game Boy
- Release: JP: September 1981; NA: November 1981
- Genre: Action
- Modes: Single-player, multiplayer

Frisky Tom (Note: Japanese: フリスキートム, Hepburn: Furisukī Tomu) is a 1981 action video game developed by Jorudan and published by Nichibutsu for arcades. It was released in Japan in September 1981 and North America in November 1981. In this game, the player assumes the role of a plumber, named Tom, who is tasked with protecting and maintaining a network of plumbing pipes that route water from a storage tank to a shower.

A Bandai Electronics VFD handheld version of Frisky Tom was released in 1982. A version for the Atari 5200 was programmed in 1983, but never published. In 1995, the game was ported to the Game Boy, as well as the Super Famicom as part of the Japan-exclusive compilation Nichibutsu Arcade Classics. Hamster Corporation released the game as part of their Arcade Hits series for the PlayStation in 2002 and the Arcade Archives series for the Nintendo Switch and PlayStation 4 in April 2021.

== Gameplay ==
Controls consist of a single four-direction joystick. The player assumes the role of a plumber, named Tom, who is tasked with protecting and maintaining a network of plumbing pipes that route water from a storage tank to a shower. Three different types of mice attempt to disrupt the water flow by knocking joints loose to cause leaks and by setting/igniting a bomb to blow up the tank. Tom must pick up the dropped joints, climb the pipes to fit them back in place, and extinguish the bomb before its fuse burns all the way down. Yellow mice can be safely knocked off the pipes, but they turn purple and become dangerous after dislodging a joint, occasionally jumping off the pipes in an attempt to hit Tom. White mice attempt to light the fuse on the bomb.

The water level in the tank steadily decreases over time, and each level ends once it is empty. A bonus counter decreases whenever water is leaking out of the pipes instead of flowing to the shower; at the end of the level, any remaining bonus is added to the player's score.

One life is lost whenever Tom touches a purple mouse or the bomb explodes. The game ends after all lives are lost.

== Reception ==
Famicom Tsūshin scored the Game Boy version of the game a 19 out of 40.
