= Crazy Climber =

1980 video game

- Arcade flyer
- Developers: Nichibutsu; Jorudan
- Publishers: Arcade: WW: Nichibutsu; NA: Taito; Ports; Atari, Inc. (2600)
- Designer: Shigeki Fujiwara
- Composer: Kenji Yoshida (Famicom)
- Platforms: Arcade, Arcadia 2001, Atari 2600, Famicom, X68000, WonderSwan
- Release: October 1980: Arcade; JP: October 1980; EU: Late 1980; NA: December 1980 Atari 2600; NA: March 1983 Famicom; JP: December 26, 1986 X68000; JP: August 27, 1993 WonderSwan; JP: July 29, 1999
- Genre: Action
- Modes: Single-player, multiplayer
- Arcade system: Crazy Climber

Crazy Climber (Note: Japanese: クレイジークライマー, Hepburn: Kureijī Kuraimā) is a vertically scrolling action game developed by Nichibutsu and Jorudan. It was published in 1980 by Nichibutsu as an arcade video game. In North America, the game was also released by Taito. Ports for the Arcadia 2001 and Atari 2600 were published in 1982, followed by the Famicom in 1986 and X68000 in 1993.

With the goal of scaling a series of skyscrapers using two joysticks (one controlling the left side of the character's body, the other the right) Crazy Climber was the first in a "climbing games" genre which includes Nintendo's 1981 Donkey Kong. The genre eventually became better known as platform games and is defined by jumping and traversal between platforms, neither of which are found in Crazy Climber.

Crazy Climber was the third highest-earning arcade game of 1980 in Japan while also being a commercial success in North America. A lesser-known sequel, Crazy Climber 2, was released for arcades in 1988.

== Gameplay ==
Famicom screenshot

The player assumes the role of a climber attempting to reach the top of four skyscrapers. The climber is controlled via two joysticks, which control his respective four limbs. Windows open and close to hinder the player's progress, so do obstacles such as falling objects. The game ends when the player is unable to catch onto windows and falls to his death.

== Development ==
Crazy Climber was designed by Shigeki Fujiwara of Nichibutsu, who would eventually create the Bomberman series for Hudson Soft. The player character was intended to be followed by a wall of fire, but was rejected by Nichibutsu. Programmers at Jorudan, including Toshikazu Sato and Kyoji Oda, were handed storyboards of the game design to work on for 5 months, with little assistance beyond quality control. Frustrated by not receiving credit for their work, they added an easter egg where if the player enters their initials as "JORDAN.LTD", it immediately turns into "JORDAN" while giving the player 2 extra credits as an in-joke. Nichibutsu never found out before players discovered the easter-egg, and Jorudan had cut ties with them at that point.

== Release ==
A version of Crazy Climber was released for the WonderSwan in Japan on July 29, 1999. This version includes four extra new stages.

== Reception ==
In Japan, Crazy Climber was the third highest-grossing arcade game of 1980, just below Pac-Man and Galaxian. Crazy Climber was also Japan's eighth highest-grossing arcade game of 1981.

In North America, Crazy Climber was among the top ten highest-earning arcade games in the summer of 1982.

== Legacy ==
In 1981, Bandai Electronics manufactured a hand-held VFD version of the game. A board game was released by Bandai in 1981, exclusively in Japan.

=== Sequels ===
A 1985 sequel titled Crazy Climber '85 was produced, but it was put into storage by Nichibutsu in favor of Terra Cresta. This unreleased sequel was eventually included in on the PlayStation version of Nichibutsu Arcade Classics.

A Japanese-only sequel, Crazy Climber 2, was produced in 1988. The game was essentially identical to Crazy Climber in gameplay but featured more sophisticated graphics and a few new features.

On February 3, 1996, Hyper Crazy Climber was released only in Japan for the PlayStation. It has similar gameplay to that of the original game but also a few differences. Players can choose between three cartooney characters, each with their own strength/speed attributes. Several buildings can be selected from a Bomberman-style map screen, including an underwater building, a medieval clock tower, a haunted skyscraper, and a beanstalk. Power-ups are also used. It was also released for Windows on November 30 the same year.

On March 2, 2000, Crazy Climber 2000 was released for the PlayStation. This is more of a remake of the original arcade game using 3D graphics for the first time. A notable feature is the ability to turn corners and access different sides of the buildings, which now have a variety of designs (including one with a cylindrical, tower-like shape). The game included the original port of the arcade Crazy Climber and a scan of the instruction panel. Like Hyper Crazy Climber which released for the same console 4 years earlier, Crazy Climber 2000 was released only in Japan.

Crazy Climber Wii was released for the Wii by Nihon System in Japan on December 20, 2007.

Hamster Corporation released the game as part of their Oretachi Gēsen Zoku Sono series for the PlayStation 2 on July 21, 2005. Hamster also released the game as part of their Arcade Archives series for the PlayStation 4 in 2014 as its debut title, the Nintendo Switch in February 2018, as well as their Console Archives series for the Nintendo Switch 2 and PlayStation 5 in September 2026. The arcade game was released on the Virtual Console in Japan on February 23, 2010.

== See also ==
- Spider-Man (1982 video game)
