= Sol Cresta =

2022 video game

- Developer: PlatinumGames
- Publisher: PlatinumGames
- Directors: Takanori Sato; Hideki Kamiya
- Producers: Takahito Washisaka; Yuji Nakao
- Designer: Hiromu Nakazono
- Composer: Yuzo Koshiro
- Series: Cresta; Neo-Classic Arcade
- Engine: Unity
- Platforms: Windows; Switch; PlayStation 4
- Release: February 22, 2022
- Genre: Scrolling shooter
- Mode: Single-player

Sol Cresta (Note: Japanese: ソルクレスタ, Hepburn: Soru Kuresuta) is a vertically scrolling shooter video game developed and published by PlatinumGames. It is the fifth and final entry in the Cresta series, following the Japan-exclusive 1997 game Terra Cresta 3D for the Sega Saturn . The title was released as the first under PlatinumGames' label of "Neo-Classic Arcade" range, a label that refers to the modernization of classic arcade games. It was released for the Nintendo Switch, PlayStation 4, and Microsoft Windows in February 2022.

== Gameplay ==
Sol Cresta is a vertical-scrolling shooter video game. Assuming the role of three different starships — the Amaterasu, Tsukuyomi, and Susano — the player is tasked with completing seven stages by shooting them whilst having to avoiding collision with them and their incoming projectiles. Each stage is broken up into several subsections lasting five minutes each. The player starts with a single starship and collects the other two as power-ups, at which point a standard formation of three is formed. Shields and coins are the two other power-ups and grant the player extra hit points. The game utilizes a "free-form docking system", in which the three starships can utilize various attacks depending on their formation. The red starship shoots red lasers that take down larger waves of weaker enemies; the blue one shoots missiles that home in on targets; the yellow one fires a drill-like projectile in a straight line, dealing an increased amount of damage. All three ships are also capable of using a charged shot that builds as enemies are taken down. Docking, splitting, and reforming the three ships is central to clearing the stages in the game. The player can also fire backward, to the side, or burst in a 360-degree fashion. The player is to pick up formation-enabling chips and fly through color-coded hoops that provide bonuses depending on which ship is leading. They must also avoid collision with blockades, retractable doors, immovable walls, and spikes. The game has five difficulty levels in arcade mode.

== Plot ==
In the Cosmic Year 101, the humanity is struggling to defeat the Mandler army, which has teamed up with the Mega Zofer in order to take over the Solar System. This forces humanity to retreat to Laomedeia, the twelfth moon of Neptune. The Solar Recovery Army Sol Cresta, led by war hero Go Kurogane, is then formed in resistance to the Mandler army. Humanity's last hope is now reliant on the ability of Yamato, a cutting-edge docking fighter, and its three pilots, Sho Tendo, Luna Zarnitsyna Sheena, and Dril Martin, in order to free the Solar System from the reign of the Mandler in one final battle.

== Development ==
Sol Cresta was directed by Takanori Sato, with music by Yuzo Koshiro, while PlatinumGames' chief designer Hideki Kamiya assumed the roles of creative and story director.

Kamiya wrote in a PlayStation blog post that PlatinumGames had come to be known as "the studio that makes action games", but that as a studio, they wanted to make games of varying genres. The desire to make Sol Cresta was born out of Kamiya's love for arcade shooting games and similar retro titles with simplistic gameplay that he had played while growing up as a child, with said love bleeding into many of Kamiya's other works such as Bayonetta and the original Devil May Cry. In 2018, Kamiya initially revealed his idea about the free-form docking shooter to PlatinumGames' studio head Atsushi Inaba, who quickly became interested as Kamiya explained how he wanted to modernize and innovate upon influential legacy shooters of the past. While in these talks, Kamiya expressed regret about how making a sequel to another company's brand would go against PlatinumGames' mission to always create their own original titles, and Inaba resolved Kamiya's reservations.

Nichibutsu had developed prior entries in the franchise including Moon Cresta and Terra Cresta, and the rights to the Terra Cresta IP were owned by Hamster Corporation. In order to acquire the rights to developing Sol Cresta, Kamiya and Inaba got in touch with Satoshi Hamada, the president of Hamster Corporation. Hamada agreed to support the project on the spot, and subsequently received internal approval in order for PlatinumGames to start work on the new project.

Yuzo Koshiro was chosen to compose the music for Sol Cresta and worked alongside sound designer Hiroshi Yamaguchi during development. In a blog post on PlatinumGames' official website, he wrote: "A few months before I received the offer, by sheer coincidence and just for fun I had copied Terra Cresta's music using the PC-88's FM sound source so from a technical standpoint, I was already prepared to start". Koshiro was asked to modernize the sound of the original arcade games by "elevating" them to a "Neo" level, and in response, he composed a demo track in the style of the original games using the Yamaha YM2151 chip, but this demo was rejected. Koshiro then drew inspiration from Kenji Yoshida, the composer of the chiptunes from the original Terra Cresta. He then upgraded to the Yamaha YM3812 chip, which became the core of Sol Cresta's FM sound.

The game was revealed to be in development as part of an April Fools' Day joke in April 2020, but was confirmed by PlatinumGames to be in development exactly one year later. The gameplay was revealed on PlatinumGames' official YouTube channel in August 2021 and was scheduled for release in December, but was delayed until its launch date of February 22, 2022.

The game launched on PlayStation 4, Switch, and Windows with downloadable content titled Sol Cresta: Dramatic, and a bundle with both the base game and DLC, titled Sol Cresta: Dramatic Edition, was made available for purchase. This DLC includes the true ending to the base game and a text-based story on the sides of the screen along with Japanese-voiced audio akin to Star Fox.

== Reception ==
Reception

Aggregate score
Aggregator	Score
Metacritic	(NS) 76/100

Review scores
Publication	Score
Destructoid	8/10
Nintendo Life	7/10
Nintendo World Report	8.5/10
TouchArcade	4/5

Sol Cresta received "generally favorable" reviews, according to review aggregator Metacritic.

Destructoid gave the game an 8 out of 10, praising the docking system, technical polish, clear visual style, sound design, and soundtrack, while criticizing the high price tag. Nintendo Life gave the title 7 stars out of 10, lauding the imaginative formation building, triple-craft coordination, various shot types, bonus scoring system, and soundtrack, but found issues with the lack of cohesion, polish, filter options, and fiddly formations. Nintendo World Report cited the five difficulty settings, in-game achievements, and soundtrack as the game's positives and wrote that the repetitive boss types and lack of visual clarity were minor drawbacks.
