= Terra Cresta =

1985 video game

- North American arcade flyer
- Developer: Nichibutsu
- Publisher: Nichibutsu
- Designer: Shigeki Fujiwara
- Composer: Kenji Yoshida
- Series: Cresta
- Platforms: Arcade, Commodore 64, Nintendo Entertainment System, X68000, ZX Spectrum
- Release: JP: September 1985; NA: November 1985
- Genre: Scrolling shooter
- Modes: Single-player, multiplayer

Terra Cresta (Note: Japanese: テラクレスタ, Hepburn: Tera Kuresuta in latin language means literally "Earth's ridge") is a 1985 vertically scrolling shooter video game developed and published by Nichibutsu for arcades. The player controls a flying craft to destroy the Mandler army before they destroy all of humanity. Gameplay involves shooting enemies and collecting different ship parts that each provide their own unique weapon, such as a wave gun or a double shot. It is the sequel to the 1980 fixed shooter Moon Cresta, Nichibutsu's first big hit in arcades, and the second installment of the Cresta series.

== Gameplay ==
Arcade screenshot

The player controls the "Wing Galibur" fighter craft and must shoot down the incoming enemy craft in the air and on the ground.

The game uses a unique powerup system: small capsules appear on the ground. Once the player has shot all of them down, the game awards the player with a piece that attaches onto the Wing Galibur. Four different pieces are available to give the Wing Galibur extra firepower and wider shots. They also act as shields, giving the player extra hits before they die. Should the player add all pieces to the ship and press the "transform" button, the Wing Galibur will transform into an invulnerable flaming phoenix for a brief period of time. Additionally, the player can press the transform button without all pieces to cause the pieces to split from the Wing Galibur and move into a triangular shape around the player. While separated, the pieces are invulnerable to all enemy fire, while the main ship is not. If the player is hit while separated, the Wing Galibur will revert to a singular craft.

== Conversions ==
Terra Cresta was ported to several home systems. European publisher Ocean Software published conversions for the ZX Spectrum and Commodore 64 on their Imagine Software label, while Nichibutsu published a version for the Family Computer in Japan. The Famicom release was later published in North America for the Nintendo Entertainment System by Vic Tokai; it features a few alterations from the Japanese version, such as a remade soundtrack and the ability to customize the position of the player's ships when they separate from formation. In 1992, Japanese developer Dempa ported both Terra Cresta and its predecessor Moon Cresta to the X68000 as the debut title in their Video Game Anthology line of arcade game re-releases, titled Video Game Anthology Vol. 1 – Moon Cresta / Terra Cresta.

In 2022, the game was re-released as an in-built game on the Sega Astro City Mini V.

== Reception ==
Reception

Review scores
Publication	Score
AllGame	3/5
Electronic Gaming Monthly	6/10, 5/10, 6/10, 5/10 (NES)
Your Sinclair	7/10
Computer Gamer	70%
Family Computer Magazine	20/30
VideoGame	4/5

In Japan, Game Machine listed Terra Cresta on their October 15, 1985 issue as being the third most-successful table arcade unit of the month.

In a 2016 retrospective review, Hardcore Gaming 101 compared the game to Super Mario Bros. in terms of taking concepts established in its predecessor and expanding on it while adding its own unique ideas alongside. They greatly praised Terra Cresta for its unique power-up system in particular, namely the ability to split the different ships apart for a short while, and favorably compared the gameplay itself to Xevious for its design and challenge, alongside its several nods to Japanese science-fiction shows and mecha. Hardcore Gaming 101 also praised Kenji Yoshida's arcade soundtrack, which used the Yamaha YM3526 sound chip, as well as the Nintendo Entertainment System version's soundtrack for being an improvement over the Japanese Family Computer version's score. In their coverage of the series in 2016, Retro Gamer magazine liked the game's enhancements over titles like Xevious, alongside its "then-contemporary" power-up system.

== Legacy ==
Terra Cresta was released for the PlayStation 2 by Hamster Corporation in 2005 as part of their Oretachi Gēsen Zoku series, including, among other things, a mini soundtrack CD and a replica instruction card. The Famicom version was digitally re-released for Microsoft Windows in 2014 by D4 Enterprise, as part of their Project EGG service, Hamster later released the game as part of their Arcade Archives series for the PlayStation 4 in 2014 and the Nintendo Switch in 2018, as well as the NES version for their Console Archives series for the Nintendo Switch 2 and PlayStation 5 in March 2026. After acquiring the entirety of Nihon Bussan's video game library in 2013, the rights to Terra Cresta are now owned by Hamster. In 2022, the original arcade version was included as part of the Sega Astro City Mini V, a vertically-oriented variant of the Astro City Mini console.
