= Hamster Corporation =

Japanese video game publisher

- Native name: 株式会社ハムスター
- Industry: Video game industry
- Founded: November 11, 1999; 27 years ago
- Headquarters: Setagaya, Tokyo, Japan
- Area served: Global
- Products: Arcade Archives
- Website: www.hamster.co.jp

Hamster Corporation (株式会社ハムスター, Kabushiki-gaisha Hamusutā) is a Japanese video game publisher, with office located in Setagaya, Tokyo, Japan. It was formed in November 1999 as a spin off of Toshiba-EMI Limited's gaming division.

On the Japanese PlayStation Store, more than 380 titles are distributed under the Arcade Archives brand, and 108 under the ACA Neo Geo brand.

== History ==
Hamster Corporation was founded in November 1999 in Setagaya Ward, Tokyo as an offshoot of the gaming division of Toshiba-EMI Limited. In April 2000, Hamster began releasing games in its budget-priced Major Waves series on the PlayStation. In its early years, Hamster also focused on web development, working on web portals for internet and gaming companies. Its own online store was launched in June 2001. In 2002, the company launched its Arcade Hits line. In January 2003, Hamster helped to launch Game Excavation Island, Konami's i-mode gaming website. In 2005, it also launched the Oretachi Gasen Zoku series, focusing on cult arcade games. The first six games announced were Scramble, Crazy Climber, Time Pilot, Moon Cresta, and Sonic Wings. When DeNA revamped its Mobage Town game site in 2008, Hamster contributed an online version of its The Convenience Store game. The company started releasing Virtual Console games on the Wii in 2010, 3DS in 2011, and Wii U in 2013.

In March 2014, Hamster acquired the rights to Nichibutsu's video game catalog. The Arcade Archives series began the same year, re-releasing classic games on the PlayStation 4. The first three titles were Crazy Climber, Ninja-Kid, and Rygar. In December, the company began its Appli Archives series for PlayStation Mobile devices.

In 2016, Hamster acquired the rights to UPL's catalog. It also introduced the ACA Neo Geo series, which focused on re-releases of titles originally produced for SNK's Neo Geo platform. The King of Fighters '94, Metal Slug, Samurai Shodown, Alpha Mission II, and Fatal Fury: King of Fighters were among the first releases. The company started releasing games on a weekly basis when the Nintendo Switch launched in March 2017. The first titles announced were Nintendo games, including Mario Bros., VS. Super Mario Bros., VS. Balloon Fight, VS. Ice Climber, VS. Pinball, VS. Clu Clu Land, and Punch-Out!! Hamster acquired the rights to NMK's games in June in 2017 and began publishing Irem's games in November 2017. It also acquired the rights to Video System's catalog in March 2018. In June 2018, Hamster re-released the original Donkey Kong arcade game on the Nintendo eShop. Nintendo's Sky Skipper was also re-released the following month. In April 2019, Hamster re-released a 1983 arcade title Donkey Kong 3 as part of the Arcade Archives series. The company also co-developed Arcade Classics: Anniversary Collection with assistance from Konami. In September 2019, Hamster was recognized by Guinness World Records for the most consecutive releases on the Nintendo eShop (133 weeks). In October 2019, the company released Nintendo's Golf as part of the Arcade Archives series.

During the COVID-19 pandemic, Hamster transitioned to remote work in March 2020. After CERO went on hiatus, the company had resorted to adjust its release schedule and concentrate on games to which the company owned the rights in order to continue its release streak. The company's CEO Satoshi Hamada slept at the office until he contracted COVID-19 and was hospitalized for over a month in 2021. During that time, Hamster still managed to maintain its release schedule.

The company released VS. Wrecking Crew in April 2020. In June 2020, Hamster announced it would be releasing Nintendo's Super Punch-Out!! and VS. Baseball. That same month, it also released Konami's Sunset Riders as the 100th title in the same series. In 2021, Hamster and Taito announced a collaboration that would be the start of its Taito Milestones series. In October, it was reported that the company had filed a trademark for "Console Archives" leading to speculation that Hamster would expand beyond re-releasing arcade games. In 2022, Sega released the Astro City Mini V mini console and it included three Nichibutsu titles; Moon Cresta (1980), Cosmo Police Galivan (1985) and Terra Cresta (1985). Hamster contributed several games to the release. In November 2022, the company reached 300 consecutive weeks of releases. In commemoration, Hamster announced the inclusion of Galaxian (1979) and Tetris: The Grand Master (1998), the first 32-bit arcade game by Arika in the Arcade Archives series. The company acquired the rights to Allumer's catalog in February 2023. The first re-release was the card game Magical Speed in 1994. It also acquired the rights to Athena's games in September 2023, starting with a 1991 arcade shoot 'em up Strike Gunner S.T.G. By 2023, Hamster had over 50 people in development and QA working on its Arcade Archives series. Its team in Hokkaido works on the company's emulators. In May 2024, the ACA2 Neo Geo series was announced for the PlayStation 5 and Xbox Series X/S as an evolution of the existing line of re-releases. That August, Hamster relocated its head office from Setagaya-ku, Tokyo to Yoga. In September, the company announced the ACA Neo Geo Selection series, a physical collection of previously released Neo Geo games.

In 2025, Hamster debuted its Arcade Archives 2 series with the 1993 release of Ridge Racer for the Nintendo Switch 2, PlayStation 5, and Xbox Series X/S. The series adds a redesigned user interface and additional game modes with "Time Attack Mode" exclusively added to Arcade Archives 2. The company had released its 500th title, Space Invaders (1978), on December 25, 2025. On February 5, 2026, Hamster revealed its Console Archives line of titles as part of a Nintendo Partner Showcase, with Cool Boarders (1996) for the original PlayStation and Ninja Gaiden II: The Dark Sword of Chaos (1990) for the NES released that same day.

== Games ==
Title	Year	Platform	Note	Ref.
Jissen Saikyo Mah-jong	2000	Windows	Developed in collaboration with Toshiba EMI	
Pink Gear Collection	2000	Windows, Mac	Developed in collaboration with Toshiba EMI	
Pink Gear 2	2000	Windows, Mac	Developed in collaboration with Toshiba EMI	
Pink Gear Mix	2000	Windows, Mac	Collection including Pink Gear Collection and Pink Gear 2.	
Dancing Wings Blue Impulse Data File	2000	Windows, Mac		
Fighting Fleets Japan Maritime Self-Defense Force Data File	2000	Windows, Mac		
Fighting Vehicles Japan Ground Self-Defense Force Data File	2000	Windows, Mac		
Fighting Wings Japan Air Self-Defense Force Data File	2000	Windows, Mac		
You Don't Know Jack Presented By Masatoshi Hamada	2000	Windows, Mac		
Masumon Kids	2000	PlayStation	Major Wave Series	
Battle Master	2000	PlayStation	Major Wave Series	
Lord Monarch: Shin Gaia Oukokuki	2000	PlayStation	Major Wave Series	
Battle Athletess: Daiundoukai Alternative	2000	PlayStation	Major Wave Series	
Zutto Issho: With Me Everytime	2000	PlayStation	Major Wave Series	
Egg	2000	PlayStation	Major Wave Series	
Love Game’s: Wai Wai Tennis	2000	PlayStation	Major Wave Series	
Master of Monsters: Disciples of Gaia	2000	PlayStation	Major Wave Series	
Athletess Daiundoukai GTO	2000	PlayStation	Major Wave Series	
Acid	2000	PlayStation	Major Wave Series	
Septentrion: Out of the Blue	2000	PlayStation	Major Wave Series	
NOëL 3: Mission on the Line	2000	PlayStation	Major Wave Series	
Bounty Sword First	2000	PlayStation	Major Wave Series	
Zipangu Jima: Unmei wa Saikoro ga Kimeru!?	2000	PlayStation	Major Wave Series	
Formation Soccer ’98: Ganbare Nippon in France	2000	PlayStation	Major Wave Series	
Bounty Sword Double Edge	2000	PlayStation	Major Wave Series	
Puzzle Mania	2000	PlayStation	Major Wave Series	
Blue Breaker ~Promise of a Smile~	2000	PlayStation	Major Wave Series	
Raiden DX	2000	PlayStation	Major Wave Series	
Puzzle Mania 2	2000	PlayStation	Major Wave Series	
The Convenience Store: Monopolize That Town	2000	PlayStation	Major Wave Series	
Blue Breaker Burst ~Smile with You~	2000	PlayStation	Major Wave Series	
The Drug Store	2000	PlayStation	Major Wave Series	
Blue Breaker Burst ~Tomorrow's Smile~	2001	PlayStation	Major Wave Series	
The Convenience Store 2: Nationwide Chain Development	2001	PlayStation	Major Wave Series	
OverBlood	2001	PlayStation	Major Wave Series	
Refrain Love	2001	PlayStation	Major Wave Series	
Captain Love!!	2001	PlayStation	Major Wave Series	
Hassha Ourai! Gatan Goton	2001	PlayStation	Major Wave Series	
Taiho Shichauzo!	2001	PlayStation	Major Wave Series	
Magical Drop F: Daibōken Mo Rakujyanai!	2001	PlayStation	Major Wave Series	
Jigsaw Island: Japan Graffiti	2001	PlayStation	Major Wave Series	
The Housoukyoku Satelli TV	2002	PlayStation	Major Wave Series	
Angel Blade	2002	PlayStation	Major Wave Series	
Nippon Ichi Mah-jong Souryu	2002	PlayStation	Major Wave Series	
Doki Doki Shutter Chance	2002	PlayStation	Major Wave Series	
Love Game’s: Wai Wai Tennis Plus	2002	PlayStation		
Palm Town	2002	PlayStation	Major Waves Series	
The Oni Taiji Mezase! Nidaime Momotarou	2002	PlayStation	Major Waves Series	
AI Shogi Selection	2002	PlayStation	Major Waves Series	
Crazy Climber	2002	PlayStation	Arcade Hits	
Hanafuda Graffiti Koikoi Monogatari	2002	PlayStation	Major Waves Series	
Moon Cresta	2002	PlayStation	Arcade Hits	
AI Mahjong Selection	2002	PlayStation	Major Waves Series	
TALL Unlimited	2002	PlayStation	Major Waves Series	
Frisky Tom	2002	PlayStation	Arcade Hits	
Kiwame Daidougi: Tsumuya Tsumazaruya	2002	PlayStation	Major Waves Series	
Sonic Wings Special	2002	PlayStation	Arcade Hits	
Kenki Ippatsu! Crane Master ni Narou!	2002	PlayStation	Major Waves Series	
Mobile Tomodachi	2002	PlayStation		
Hana to Ryuu: Hanafuda Mah-jong	2002	PlayStation	Major Waves Series	
Outlaws of the Lost Dynasty	2002	PlayStation	Arcade Hits	
Magical Drop	2002	PlayStation	Arcade Hits	
Raiden	2002	PlayStation	Arcade Hits	
Game Hakkutsu-Jima	2003	i-mode		
Wai Wai Bowling	2003	PlayStation	Major Waves Series	
Wai Wai Cart	2003	PlayStation	Major Waves Series	
Drifting	2003	PlayStation		
Shienryu	2003	PlayStation	Arcade Hits	
Wai Wai Kusa Yakyuu	2003	PlayStation		
Hyouryuu Ki: The Reportage Beyond the Sea	2003	PlayStation		
Block Kuzushi	2003	PlayStation		
The Convenience Store 3: Dominate That Town	2003	PlayStation 2		
The Family Restaurant: Shijou Saikyou no Menu	2003	PlayStation	Major Waves Series	
Sōkyūgurentai	2003	PlayStation	Arcade Hits	
Azito	2003	PlayStation	Major Waves Series	
Wolf Fang	2003	PlayStation	Arcade Hits	
Techno eJay	2003	Windows	eJay series	
HipHop eJay	2003	Windows	eJay series	
Dance eJay	2003	Windows	eJay series	
Suki Suki Inufukuen	2004	i-mode		
Sukusuku Inufuku	2004	PlayStation 2		
Hello Kitty no PikoPiko Daisakusen	2005	PlayStation 2	Based on Hello Kitty	
House eJay	2005	Windows	eJay series	
Dance 2 eJay	2005	Windows	eJay series	
Scramble	2005	PlayStation 2	Oretachi Geasen Zoku	
Time Pilot	2005	PlayStation 2	Oretachi Geasen Zoku	
Moon Cresta	2005	PlayStation 2	Oretachi Geasen Zoku	
Sonic Wings	2005	PlayStation 2	Oretachi Geasen Zoku	
Karate Dou	2005	PlayStation 2	Oretachi Geasen Zoku	
Crazy Climber	2005	PlayStation 2	Oretachi Geasen Zoku	
Bae Yong-joon Typing Winter Sonata Volume 1	2005	Windows	Based on Korean drama Winter Sonata	
Bae Yong-joon Typing Winter Sonata Volume 2	2005	Windows	Based on Korean drama Winter Sonata	
Super Volleyball	2005	PlayStation 2	Oretachi Geasen Zoku	
Terra Cresta	2005	PlayStation 2	Oretachi Geasen Zoku	
BurgerTime	2005	PlayStation 2	Oretachi Geasen Zoku	
Yie Ar Kung-Fu	2005	PlayStation 2	Oretachi Geasen Zoku	
Quarth	2006	PlayStation 2	Oretachi Geasen Zoku	
Nekketsu Kouha Kunio-kun	2006	PlayStation 2	Oretachi Geasen Zoku	
Rabio Lepus	2006	PlayStation 2	Oretachi Geasen Zoku	
Nekketsu Koukou Dodge Ball Bu	2006	PlayStation 2	Oretachi Geasen Zoku	
The Conveni 200X	2006	Xbox 360		
The Convenience Store 4: Dominate That Town	2006	PlayStation 2	Oretachi Geasen Zoku	
Pooyan	2006	PlayStation 2	Oretachi Geasen Zoku	
Contra	2006	PlayStation 2	Oretachi Geasen Zoku	
Akumajō Dracula	2006	PlayStation 2	Oretachi Geasen Zoku	
The Convenience Store: Dominate That Town	2006	PlayStation Store (Game Archives)		
Ninja JaJaMaru-kun	2006	Wii	Virtual Console	
Thunder Cross	2007	PlayStation 2	Oretachi Geasen Zoku	
Trio the Punch	2007	PlayStation 2	Oretachi Geasen Zoku	
Puzzle Mania	2007	PlayStation Store (Game Archives)	Major Waves Series	
The Drug Store	2007	PlayStation Store (Game Archives)	Major Waves Series	
Quiz & Variety Sukusuku Inufuku	2007	PlayStation 2		
TALL Unlimited	2007	PlayStation Store (Game Archives)	Major Waves Series	
Raiden	2007	PlayStation Store (Game Archives)	Arcade Hits	
Love Game’s: Wai Wai Tennis Plus	2007	PlayStation Store (Game Archives)		
Exerion	2007	Wii	Virtual Console	
Septentrion: Out of the Blue	2007	PlayStation Store (Game Archives)		
Field Combat	2007	Wii	Virtual Console	
Zipangu Jima: Unmei wa Saikoro ga Kimeru!?	2007	PlayStation Store (Game Archives)		
Puzzle Mania 2	2007	PlayStation Store (Game Archives)		
AI Mahjong Selection	2007	PlayStation Store (Game Archives)		
AI Shogi Selection	2007	PlayStation Store (Game Archives)		
Sonic Wings Special	2007	PlayStation Store (Game Archives)	Arcade Hits	
The Family Restaurant: Shijou Saikyou no Menu	2007	PlayStation Store (Game Archives)	Major Waves Series	
Bases Loaded	2007	Wii	Virtual Console	
Blue Breaker: Egao no Yakusoku	2007	PlayStation Store (Game Archives)	Major Waves Series	
Azito	2007	PlayStation Store (Game Archives)	Major Waves Series	
Hanafuda Graffiti Koikoi Monogatari	2007	PlayStation Store (Game Archives)	Major Waves Series	
Hana to Ryuu: Hanafuda Mah-jong	2007	PlayStation Store (Game Archives)	Major Waves Series	
Moon Cresta	2007	PlayStation Store (Game Archives)	Arcade Hits	
Blue Breaker Burst: Hohoemi o Anata to	2007	PlayStation Store (Game Archives)	Major Waves Series	
Frisky Tom	2007	PlayStation Store (Game Archives)	Arcade Hits	
Blue Breaker Burst: Egao no Asuni	2007	PlayStation Store (Game Archives)	Major Waves Series	
Block Kuzushi	2008	PlayStation Store (Game Archives)	Major Waves Series	
Wai Wai Kusa Yakyuu	2008	PlayStation Store (Game Archives)	Major Waves Series	
Wai Wai Kart	2008	PlayStation Store (Game Archives)	Major Waves Series	
Wai Wai Bowling	2008	PlayStation Store (Game Archives)	Major Waves Series	
City Connection	2008	Wii	Virtual Console	
Master Of Monsters Akatsuki no Kenjatachi	2008	PlayStation Store (Game Archives)	Major Waves Series	
Shienryu	2008	PlayStation Store (Game Archives)	Arcade Hits	
Lord Monarch	2008	PlayStation Store (Game Archives)	Major Waves Series	
Acid	2008	PlayStation Store (Game Archives)	Major Waves Series	
The Conveni DS Otona no Keiei Ryoku Training	2008	Nintendo DS		
Ninja-kun: Adventure of Devil Castle	2008	Wii	Virtual Console	
Formation Z	2009	Wii	Virtual Console	
Puppet Zoo Pilomy	2009	PlayStation Store (Game Archives)		
Ninja Kid II	2009	Wii	Virtual Console	
Maruhan Pachinko & Pachi Shot Hisshou Guide Kyouryoku	2009	DS		
Gaia Seed: Project Seed Trap	2009	PlayStation Store (Game Archives)		
Tall: Twins Tower	2009	PlayStation Store (Game Archives)		
Rapid Angel	2009	PlayStation Store (Game Archives)		
Epica Stella	2009	PlayStation Store (Game Archives)		
Mikagura Shoujo Tanteidan	2009	PlayStation Store (Game Archives)		
Lucifer Ring	2009	PlayStation Store (Game Archives)		
Magical Drop III: Yokubari Tokudaigou!	2009	PlayStation Store (Game Archives)		
Neko Zamurai	2009	PlayStation Store (Game Archives)		
Zoku Mikagura Shoujo Tanteidan – Kanketsuhen	2009	PlayStation Store (Game Archives)		
NOëL: Not Digital	2009	PlayStation Store (Game Archives)		
Kyuīn	2010	PlayStation Store (Game Archives)		
Hyper Crazy Climber	2010	PlayStation Store (Game Archives)		
Kakuge-Yaro: Fighting Game Creator	2010	PlayStation Store (Game Archives)		
Family Chess	2010	PlayStation Store (Game Archives)		
Crazy Climber	2010	Wii	Virtual Console	
Deadheat Road	2010	PlayStation Store (Game Archives)		
Family Diamond	2010	PlayStation Store (Game Archives)		
Moon Cresta	2010	Wii	Virtual Console	
Family Gunjin Shogi	2010	PlayStation Store (Game Archives)		
Karate Dou	2010	Wii	Virtual Console	
Bakuretsu Akindo Uchuu Goushouden	2010	PlayStation Store (Game Archives)		
Ganso Family Mahjong	2010	PlayStation Store (Game Archives)		
Hashiriya: Ookami Tachi no Densetsu	2010	PlayStation Store (Game Archives)	Arcade Hits	
Wolf Fang	2010	PlayStation Store (Game Archives)	Arcade Hits	
Mr. Do!	2010	Wii	Virtual Console	
Shinobi no Roku	2010	PlayStation Store (Game Archives)		
Ground Stroke	2010	PlayStation Store (Game Archives)		
Sekai Saikyou Ginsei Igo 3	2010	PlayStation Store (Game Archives)		
DonPachi	2010	PlayStation Store (Game Archives)		
DoDonPachi	2010	PlayStation Store (Game Archives)		
Jet CopterX	2010	PlayStation Store (Game Archives)		
Hi-Hou-Ou: Mou Omae to wa Kuchi Kikan!!	2010	PlayStation Store (Game Archives)		
The Firemen 2	2010	PlayStation Store (Game Archives)		
NOëL: La Neige	2010	PlayStation Store (Game Archives)		
Zig Zag Ball	2010	PlayStation Store (Game Archives)		
Wai Wai Trump Taisen	2010	PlayStation Store (Game Archives)		
Wai Wai 3-nin Uchi Mahjong	2010	PlayStation Store (Game Archives)		
DiORAMOS	2010	PlayStation Store (Game Archives)		
Card II	2010	PlayStation Store (Game Archives)	SuperLite1500 Series	
Minna Atsumare! Igo Kyoushitu	2010	PlayStation Store (Game Archives)		
NOëL: La Neige Special	2010	PlayStation Store (Game Archives)		
Sugoroku Hunter	2010	PlayStation Store (Game Archives)	SuperLite1500 Series	
Hanafuda II	2010	PlayStation Store (Game Archives)	SuperLite1500 Series	
Oekaki Puzzle	2010	PlayStation Store (Game Archives)	SuperLite1500 Series	
elan	2010	PlayStation Store (Game Archives)		
Ungra Walker	2010	PlayStation Store (Game Archives)		
Anoko Doko Noko	2010	PlayStation Store (Game Archives)		
Bomb Boat	2010	PlayStation Store (Game Archives)	SuperLite1500 Series	
Oekaki Puzzle 2	2010	PlayStation Store (Game Archives)	SuperLite1500 Series	
Hooockey!!	2010	PlayStation Store (Game Archives)	SuperLite1500 Series	
Love Game’s: Wai Wai Tennis	2010	PlayStation Store (Game Archives)	Major Waves Series	
Pangaea	2010	PlayStation Store (Game Archives)	SuperLite1500 Series	
Curling	2010	PlayStation Store (Game Archives)	SuperLite1500 Series	
Quiz Master Red	2010	PlayStation Store (Game Archives)	SuperLite1500 Series	
NOëL 3: Mission on the Line	2010	PlayStation Store (Game Archives)		
Silhouette Mirage: Reprogrammed Hope	2010	PlayStation Store (Game Archives)		
Angolmois 99	2010	PlayStation Store (Game Archives)	SuperLite1500 Series	
Anoko Doko Noko Endless Season	2010	PlayStation Store (Game Archives)	SuperLite1500 Series	
Quiz Master Blue	2010	PlayStation Store (Game Archives)	SuperLite1500 Series	
Pinball Golden Logres	2010	PlayStation Store (Game Archives)	SuperLite1500 Series	
Oekaki Puzzle 3	2010	PlayStation Store (Game Archives)	SuperLite1500 Series	
Salary-man Champ Tatakau Salaried Man	2010	PlayStation Store (Game Archives)		
Saikyou Ginsei Mahjong	2010	PlayStation Store (Game Archives)		
Quiz Master Yellow	2010	PlayStation Store (Game Archives)	SuperLite1500 Series	
Oekaki Puzzle 4	2010	PlayStation Store (Game Archives)	SuperLite1500 Series	
Saikyou Ginsei Chess	2010	PlayStation Store (Game Archives)		
Oekaki Puzzle 5	2010	PlayStation Store (Game Archives)	SuperLite1500 Series	
Saikyou Ginsei Shougi 2	2010	PlayStation Store (Game Archives)		
Cotton 100%	2010	PlayStation Store (Game Archives)	SuperLite1500 Series	
Idol Janshi Suchie-Pai	2010	Wii	Virtual Console	
elan plus	2010	PlayStation Store (Game Archives)		
Puzzle by Nikoli Sudoku +2 Volume 1: Sudoku Nurikabe Heyawake	2010	PSP		
Arms’ Heart	2010	PSP		
Rival Turf!	2010	Wii	Virtual Console	
KohniShogun	2010	PlayStation Store (Game Archives)		
Koten Tsugoshuu: Shijin no Kan	2010	PlayStation Store (Game Archives)		
Goryujin Electro	2010	PlayStation Store (Game Archives)		
Digital Glider Airman	2010	PlayStation Store (Game Archives)		
Super E.D.F. Earth Defense Force	2011	Wii	Virtual Console	
Mr. Prospector: Horiate-kun	2011	PlayStation Store (Game Archives)		
Uki Uki Tsuri Tengoku: Ningyo Densetsu no Nazo	2011	PlayStation Store (Game Archives)		
Puzzle by Nikoli Sudoku +3 Volume 2: Sudoku – Kakuro – Akari – Hitori	2011	PlayStation Store (Game Archives)		
Doukyu re-mix Billiards Multiple	2011	PlayStation Store (Game Archives)		
Suizokukan Project Fish Hunter e no Michi	2011	PlayStation Store (Game Archives)		
Uki Uki Tsuri Tengoku: Kawa Monogatari	2011	PlayStation Store (Game Archives)		
Uki Uki Tsuri Tengoku: Uokami Densetsu o Oe	2011	PlayStation Store (Game Archives)		
Quiz Shuu	2011	PlayStation Store (Game Archives)	SuperLite 3 in 1 Series	
The Ignition Factor	2011	Wii	Virtual Console	
Puzzle by Nikoli Sudoku +3 Volume 3: Sudoku – Slitherlink – Masyu – Yajilin	2011	PSP		
The Convenience Store: Aim for National Domination!	2011	Mobage		
Bounty Sword First	2011	PlayStation Store (Game Archives)		
Oekaki Puzzle Shuu	2011	PlayStation Store (Game Archives)	SuperLite 3 in 1 Series	
Brawl Brothers	2011	Wii	Virtual Console	
Avenging Spirit	2011	Nintendo 3DS	Virtual Console	
Sudoku by Nikoli	2011	Nintendo 3DS		
Puzzle by Nikoli Sudoku +3 Volume 4: Sudoku – Numberlink – Shikaku – Hashiwokakero	2011	PSP		
Fortified Zone	2011	Nintendo 3DS	Virtual Console	
Ocha no ma Battle	2011	PlayStation Store (Game Archives)		
Bounty Sword Double Edge	2011	PlayStation Store (Game Archives)		
Winning Lure	2011	PlayStation Store (Game Archives)		
Akari by Nikoli	2011	Nintendo 3DS		
MerbyBabyStory	2011	PlayStation Store (Game Archives)		
Kakuro by Nikoli	2011	Nintendo 3DS		
Double Dragon	2011	PlayStation Store (Game Archives)		
Slitherlink by Nikoli	2011	Nintendo 3DS		
Geo Cube	2011	PlayStation Store (Game Archives)		
Nurikabe by Nikoli	2011	Nintendo 3DS		
Heyawake by Nikoli	2011	Nintendo 3DS		
Voltage Fighter Gowcaizer	2011	PlayStation Store (Game Archives)		
Seicross	2011	Wii	Virtual Console	
Masyu by Nikoli	2011	Nintendo 3DS		
Hitori by Nikoli	2011	Nintendo 3DS		
Azito 3D	2011	Nintendo 3DS		
Crazy Climber	2011	Android		
Ikari no Yousai 2	2012	Nintendo 3DS	Virtual Console	
Maru’s Mission	2012	Nintendo 3DS	Virtual Console	
Slam Dragon	2012	PlayStation Store (Game Archives)		
Dragonseeds	2012	PlayStation Store (Game Archives)		
Moon Cresta	2012	Android		
Puzzle by Nikoli V Sudoku	2012	PS Vita		
Sonic Wings Special	2012	Android		
T Kara Hajimaru Monogatari	2012	PlayStation Store (Game Archives)		
Puzzle by Nikoli V Sudoku: 12 exquisite puzzles	2012	PS Vita		
Puzzle by Nikoli V Kakuro	2012	PS Vita		
Hashiwokakero by Nikoli	2012	Nintendo 3DS		
Puzzle by Nikoli V Slitherlink	2012	PS Vita		
Shikaku by Nikoli	2012	Nintendo 3DS		
Puzzle by Nikoli V Nurikabe	2012	PS Vita		
Azito 3D Kyoto	2012	Nintendo 3DS		
Puzzle by Nikoli V Heyawake	2012	PS Vita		
Heavy Fire: The Chosen Few	2012	Nintendo 3DS		
Puzzle by Nikoli V Akari	2012	PS Vita		
Puzzle by Nikoli V Masyu	2012	PS Vita		
Puzzle by Nikoli V Hitori	2012	PS Vita		
Puzzle by Nikoli Sudoku LITE Volume 1	2012	PSP		
Puzzle by Nikoli Sudoku LITE Volume 2	2012	PSP		
Puzzle by Nikoli Sudoku LITE Volume 3	2012	PSP		
Puzzle by Nikoli Sudoku LITE Volume 4	2012	PSP		
Puzzle by Nikoli V Hashiwokakero	2012	PS Vita		
Heavy Fire: Afghanistan	2012	PlayStation 3		
Puzzle by Nikoli V Shikaku	2012	PS Vita		
Puzzle by Nikoli V Numberlink	2012	PS Vita		
Puzzle by Nikoli V Yajilin	2012	PS Vita		
Magic Arrows	2012	PlayStation Mobile		
Sukusuku Inufuku	2012	PlayStation 3		
Ninja JaJaMaru-kun	2012	Nintendo 3DS	Virtual Console	
The Conveni 3	2012	PlayStation 3		
Azito 3D Tokyo	2012	Nintendo 3DS		
City Connection	2013	Nintendo 3DS	Virtual Console	
Heavy Fire: Shattered Spear	2013	PlayStation 3, Xbox 360		
Azito 3D Osaka	2013	Nintendo 3DS		
Yajilinby Nikoli	2013	Nintendo 3DS		
Psyvariar Complete Edition	2013	PlayStation 3		
Field Combat	2013	Nintendo 3DS	Virtual Console	
Bases Loaded	2013	Nintendo 3DS	Virtual Console	
Youkoso Hitsuji Mura	2013	PlayStation 3		
Ninja JaJaMaru-kun	2013	Wii U	Virtual Console	
Ninja JaJaMaru-kun Sakura-hime to Karyu no Himitsu	2013	Nintendo 3DS		
Numberlink by Nikoli	2013	Nintendo 3DS		
Puzzle by Nikoli Sudoku 3D: 1000 questions in 8 puzzles	2013	Nintendo 3DS		
Zutto Issho	2013	PlayStation Store (Game Archives)		
Puzzle by Nikoli X Sudoku	2013	Windows		
Puzzle by Nikoli Sudoku 3D Volume 2: 1000 questions in 8 puzzles	2013	Nintendo 3DS		
Akai Ito	2013	PlayStation 3		
Brawl Brothers	2013	Wii U	Virtual Console	
BandFuse: Rock Legends	2013	PlayStation 3, Xbox 360		
Puzzle by Nikoli 4 Sudoku	2014	PlayStation 4		
Puzzle by Nikoli 4 Kakuro	2014	PlayStation 4		
Puzzle by Nikoli 4 Slitherlink	2014	PlayStation 4		
Puzzle by Nikoli 4 Nurikabe	2014	PlayStation 4		
Zumba Fitness World Party	2014	Wii U, Xbox One		
Puzzle by Nikoli 4 Heyawake	2014	PlayStation 4		
Bases Loaded	2014	Wii U	Virtual Console	
Puzzle by Nikoli 4 Akari	2014	PlayStation 4		
Puzzle by Nikoli 4 Masyu	2014	PlayStation 4		
Nikoli Sliterlink	2014	PlayStation Mobile	Appli Archives	
Jaleco City Connection	2014	PlayStation Mobile	Appli Archives	
Nippon Ichi Software Duologue	2014	PlayStation Mobile	Appli Archives	
Jaleco Momoko 1200%	2014	PlayStation Mobile	Appli Archives	
IDAC Escape Game Pack 1 - 7	2015	PlayStation Mobile	Appli Archives	
Nippon Ichi Software Mini Game Pack 1, 2	2015	PlayStation Mobile	Appli Archives	
Jaleco Argus & Field Combat	2015	PlayStation Mobile	Appli Archives	
Nikoli Crossword 1 - 3	2015	PlayStation Mobile	Appli Archives	
Team Rise Vol. 1 - 11	2015	PlayStation Mobile	Appli Archives	
extreme Pairon Mobile 1 - 7	2015	PlayStation Mobile	Appli Archives	
G-mode Burger Time	2015	PlayStation Mobile	Appli Archives	
AlphaNuts Deserter’s2DX	2015	PlayStation Mobile	Appli Archives	
Jaleco Formation Z & Bases Loaded	2015	PlayStation Mobile	Appli Archives	
G-mode Karate Spirits	2015	PlayStation Mobile	Appli Archives	
AlphaNuts Takusuku FRESH!	2015	PlayStation Mobile	Appli Archives	
AlphaNuts CrimsonBlue	2015	PlayStation Mobile	Appli Archives	
Boosim Lab Minnano Yabo Neo	2015	PlayStation Mobile	Appli Archives	
Nikoli Slitherlink 2 - 8	2015	PlayStation Mobile	Appli Archives	
Boosim Lab Mini Game Pack	2015	PlayStation Mobile	Appli Archives	
Azito x Tatsunoko Legends	2015	Xbox One		
Seicross	2015	Wii U	Virtual Console	
Puzzle by Nikoli 4 Hashiwokakero	2015	PlayStation 4		
Puzzle by Nikoli 4 Shikaku	2015	PlayStation 4		
Puzzle by Nikoli 4 Numberlink	2015	PlayStation 4		
Puzzle by Nikoli 4 Yajilin	2016	PlayStation 4		
Puzzle by Nikoli 4 Hitori	2016	PlayStation 4		
MagMax	2016	Wii U	Virtual Console	
Sol Cresta	2022	PlayStation 4, Windows, Nintendo Switch	Co-developed with PlatinumGames.	
Puzzle by Nikoli W Sudoku	2022	Xbox One, Windows		
Puzzle by Nikoli S Sudoku	2022	Nintendo Switch		
Puzzle by Nikoli W Akari	2022	Xbox One, Windows		
Puzzle by Nikoli S Akari	2022	Nintendo Switch		
Puzzle by Nikoli W Slitherlink	2022	Xbox One, Windows		
Puzzle by Nikoli S Slitherlink	2022	Nintendo Switch		
Puzzle by Nikoli W Nurikabe	2022	Xbox One, Windows		
Puzzle by Nikoli S Nurikabe	2022	Nintendo Switch		
Puzzle by Nikoli W Heyawake	2023	Xbox One, Windows		
Puzzle by Nikoli S Heyawake	2023	Nintendo Switch		
Puzzle by Nikoli W Hashiwokakero	2023	Xbox One, Windows		
Puzzle by Nikoli S Hashiwokakero	2023	Nintendo Switch		
Puzzle by Nikoli W Masyu	2023	Xbox One, Windows		
Puzzle by Nikoli S Masyu	2023	Nintendo Switch		
Puzzle by Nikoli W Shikaku	2023	Xbox One, Windows		
Puzzle by Nikoli S Shikaku	2023	Nintendo Switch		
Puzzle by Nikoli W Numberlink	2023	Xbox One, Windows		
Puzzle by Nikoli S Numberlink	2023	Nintendo Switch		
Puzzle by Nikoli W Yajilin	2023	Xbox One, Windows		
Puzzle by Nikoli S Yajilin	2023	Nintendo Switch		
Puzzle by Nikoli W Hitori	2023	Xbox One, Windows		
Puzzle by Nikoli S Hitori	2023	Nintendo Switch		
Puzzle by Nikoli W Kakuro	2023	Xbox One, Windows		
Puzzle by Nikoli S Kakuro	2023	Nintendo Switch		
