= Universal Entertainment =

Japanese video game company

Universal Entertainment Corporation

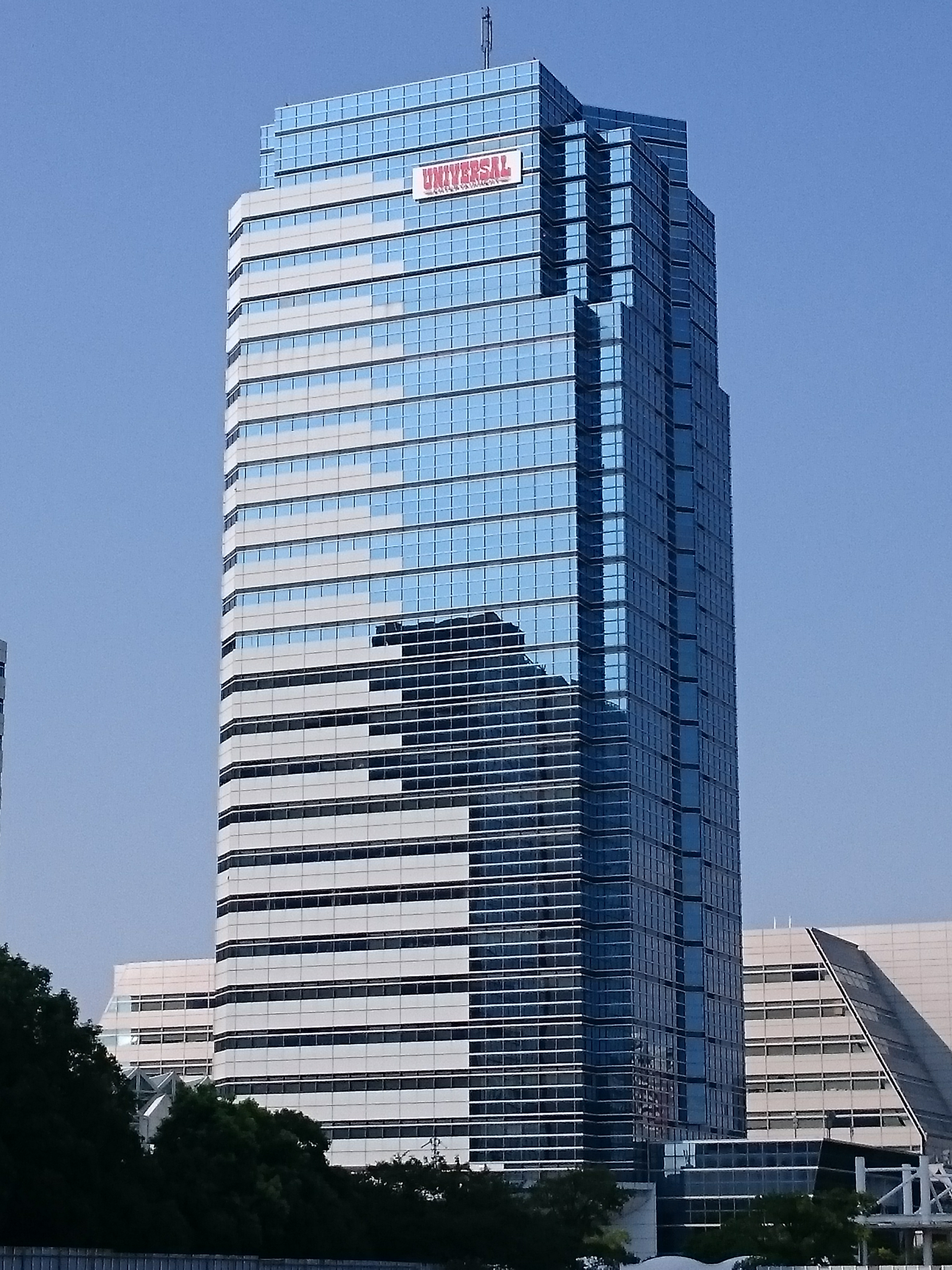
- Headquarters in Tokyo, Japan
- Native name: 株式会社ユニバーサルエンターテインメント
- Romanized name: Kabushiki-gaisha Yunibāsaru Entāteimmento
- Formerly: Universal Lease Co., Ltd.; Universal Ltd.; Aruze Corporation
- Type: Public
- Traded as: TYO: 6425
- Industry: Pachinko; Video game
- Founded: December 2, 1969
- Founder: Kazuo Okada
- Headquarters: Kōtō, Tokyo, Japan
- Area served: Worldwide
- Key people: Jun Fujimoto; President
- Products: Pachinko; Pachislot; Slot machines Video games
- Revenue: ¥124 billion
- Number of employees: 988 (2019)
- Website: www.universal-777.com/en/

Universal Entertainment Corporation, (Note: Japanese: 株式会社ユニバーサルエンターテインメント, Hepburn: Kabushiki-gaisha Yunibāsaru Entāteimmento) formerly known as Aruze Corporation (Japanese: アルゼ株式会社, Hepburn: Aruze Kabushiki-gaisha) and Universal, is a Japanese manufacturer of pachinko, slot machines, arcade games and other gaming products, and a publisher of video games. Aruze possesses licenses to both manufacture and distribute casino machines in the American states of Nevada, Mississippi and New Jersey. The company's corporate headquarters are in Tokyo. Aruze is also the licence holder of the video game franchise Shadow Hearts. Up until February 18, 2012, the company owned approximately 21% of Wynn Resorts. On November 1, 2009, Aruze Corporation changed its name to Universal Entertainment Corporation.

== Universal ==
Universal Lease Co., Ltd was established in December 1969. It later changed its name to Universal Ltd in Japan. Universal Distributing Company opened as an American subsidiary to sell video games direct to operators, and was later named Universal USA.

They initially earned success with arcade video games that cloned popular arcade games. Scratch (1977) was a Breakout clone that became the third highest-earning arcade video game of 1977 in Japan, just below Speed Race DX and Breakout. Scratch was again Japan's fourth highest-earning arcade video game of 1978. Cosmic Monsters (1978) was a Space Invaders clone that became Japan's sixth highest-earning arcade video game the same year.

Universal eventually moved away from clones and began producing original arcade games. Get A Way (Note: Japanese: ゲッタウェイ) (1978) was a sit-down arcade racing game that used a 16-bit central processing unit (CPU), for which it was advertised as the world's first 16-bit game; it was among Japan's top twenty highest-earning arcade video games of 1978.

Universal followed with the hugely influential platform game Space Panic (1980) and the maze game Lady Bug (1981). Universal's greatest hit game was Mr. Do! (1982), which spawned three sequels in the eventual Mr. Do series: Mr. Do's Castle, Mr. Do's Wild Ride and Do Run Run. Cashing-in on the success of laserdisc video games, Universal released Super Don Quix-ote in 1984, on a new standardized laserdisc video game system they called the Universal System 1. A new game was planned every six months for the Universal System 1, including an unreleased laserdisc adventure game based on Mr. Do!, but the company stopped producing arcade games in 1985, and Super Don Quix-ote ended up being the only game released for the system. Universal Distributing of Nevada (UDN) was established to begin selling Universal's first slot machines direct to the gaming industry. A division, Universal Playland, was set up to continue the arcade game business.

Several Universal titles were designed by Kazutoshi Ueda, most notably Mr. Do! (1982). He later left Universal and went on to work at Tehkan (now Tecmo), then became a co-founder of Atlus, where he worked on the Megami Tensei series. Ueda's work at Universal inspired the game design style of Tehkan's Michitaka Tsuruta, who went on to create Guzzler (1983), Bomb Jack (1984), Solomon's Key (1986), and the Captain Tsubasa game series.

In January 2005, the company became a wholly owned subsidiary of Aruze. Aruze Corporation changed its company name to Universal Entertainment Corporation effective November 1, 2009.

On February 2, 2023, Aruze Gaming filed for Chapter 11 bankruptcy protection in the United States.

== Relationship with SNK ==
In 2000, Aruze bought out SNK Corporation, maker of the Neo Geo. In exchange for the use of SNK's popular characters on their pachinko and slot machines, and a few games for the Neo Geo, Aruze promised financial backing for the failing SNK. Instead Aruze instituted a program to liquidate SNK's assets and cut costs. This included licensing out popular IP to other companies (such as Metal Slug series, The King of Fighters series and Sengoku series), closing underperforming divisions, discontinuing distribution outside Japan, ending support for the Neo Geo arcade platform and selling off warehoused inventory. By 2001 it was clear to many SNK's employees that Aruze was not planning to preserve SNK and was simply going to let the company implode after liquidating most of its useful assets. So Eikichi Kawasaki and many other executives from SNK left to form Playmore on August 1, 2001. Over this period many rank and file employees left to join other arcade developers or form their own companies.

On November 1, 2001, Aruze announced that its subsidiary, SNK to file for bankruptcy by the Osaka District Court on October 30, 2001, and all of its assets went up for bidding. Kawasaki's Playmore stepped in and bought up most of the auctioned assets and set itself up to re-enter the video game market as the successor to SNK. Playmore also acquired some of the companies formed by ex-SNK employees, namely Brezzasoft and Noise Factory, to jumpstart development of more titles for the Neo Geo arcade system. Playmore quickly went about re-establishing themselves in the market; they opened new branches in North America and Europe, announced development of new titles for the Neo Geo arcade system, started developing games for console and portable systems for the first time in years and re-established distribution channels to sell inventory for the Neo Geo home and pocket systems. To further establish themselves as a reborn SNK they officially changed their name to SNK Playmore in 2003.

In October 2002, Aruze was sued by Playmore founder Eikichi Kawasaki for copyright infringement over SNK's intellectual properties, claiming their use was unauthorized by Playmore. In January 2004, a preliminary decision was handed down by the Osaka District Court favoring SNK Playmore and was awarded 5.64 billion yen (US$57,627,468) in damages.

== UPL ==
UPL
- Formerly: Universal Playland (1972–1983)
- Type: Public
- Industry: Video games
- Founded: February 29, 1972
- Defunct: March 4, 1992
- Fate: Bankruptcy
- Headquarters: Oyama, Tochigi, Japan
- Key people: Tsutomu Fujisawa; Ryuichi Nishizawa
- Parent: Universal Entertainment
- Website: UPL-Grave Digger

UPL Co., Ltd (株式会社ユーピーエル), formerly known as Universal Playland (ユニバーサルプレイランド), was a video game developer headquartered in Oyama, Tochigi, Japan. It was founded in 1972 to continue Universal Entertainment's arcade business. On November 1, 1983, the company was renamed to UPL. The company filed for bankruptcy on March 4, 1992.

Near the end of UPL's business, founder Tsutomu Fujisawa later established a new video game company called Scarab, which renamed itself several years later as feelplus.

In May 2016, UPL sold its rights to Hamster Corporation who then released the company's games through the Arcade Archives lineup.

== Games ==
=== Universal Entertainment ===
==== Arcade video games ====
- Scratch (1977)
- Cosmic Monsters (1978)
- Cosmic Alien (1979)
- Cosmic Guerilla (1979)
- Galaxy Wars (1979, released by Taito)
- Get A Way (1979)
- Cheeky Mouse (1980)
- Devil Zone (1980)
- Magical Spot (1980)
- No Man's Land (1980)
- Space Panic (1980)
- Cosmic Avenger (1981)
- Lady Bug (1981)
- Snap Jack (1981)
- Zero Hour (1981)
- Mr. Do! (1982)
- Mrs. Dynamite (1982 – Unreleased)
- Space Raider (1982)
- Eggs (1983, licensed from Technōs Japan)
- Mr. Do's Castle aka Mr. Do vs Unicorns (1983)
- Mr. Do's Wild Ride (1984)
- Do! Run Run (1984; released in Japan in 1987 as "Super Pierrot")
- Jumping Jack (1984)
- Kick Rider (1984)
- Super Don Quix-ote (1984)
- Captain Zap (1985 – Unreleased)
- Indoor Soccer (1985)

=== UPL ===
==== Arcade video games ====
- Mouser (1983, released in North America by Cosmos)
- Nova 2001 (1983)
- Ninja-kun Majou no Bouken (1984, released by Taito)
- Return of the Invaders (1984, released by Taito)
- Penguin-kun Wars (1985)
- Raiders5 (1985, released by Taito)
- XX Mission (1986, released in North America by United Artists Theatre Amusements)
- Ark Area (1987)
- Mutant Night (1987)
- Ninja-Kid II (1987, released in the US by World Games as Rad Action, and by United Amusements as JT-104)
- Atomic Robo-Kid (1988, released in North America by Nikom)
- Omega Fighter (1989, released in North America by American Sammy)
- Otogizoushi Urashima Mahjong (1989)
- Task Force Harrier (1989, released in North America by American Sammy)
- Bio-ship Paladin (1990, released in North America by American Sammy)
- US-AAF Mustang (1990)
- Vandyke (1991)
- Acrobat Mission (1991, released by Taito)
- Black Heart (1991)
- Koutetsu Yousai Strahl (1992)

==== Game Boy ====
- Ninja Taro (published outside of Japan by American Sammy)

==== Mega Drive/Genesis ====
- Atomic Robo-Kid (ported by Treco)
- Bio-ship Paladin (ported by Aisystem Tokyo)

==== X68000 ====
- Atomic Robo-Kid (ported by System Sacom)

==== Super NES ====
- Acrobat Mission (ported by Teichiku)
- Super Ninja-kun (published by Jaleco)

==== TurboGrafx-16/TurboGrafx-CD ====
- Atomic Robo-Kid Special
- Gomola Speed

=== Aruze ===
Title	First release	Developer(s)	System
Pachi-Slot Aruze Oukoku	June 3, 1999	Aruze	PlayStation
Pachi-Slot Aruze Oukoku Pocket: Hanabi	October 21, 1999	Aruze	NeoGeo Pocket Color
Pachi-Slot Aruze Oukoku 2	November 25, 1999	Aruze	PlayStation
Azteca	February 10, 2000		NeoGeo Pocket Color
Pachi-Slot Aruze Oukoku 3	July 19, 2000	Aruze	PlayStation
Pachi-Slot Aruze Oukoku Porcano 2	July 20, 2000	Aruze	NeoGeo Pocket Color
Pachisuro Aruze Oogoku Ohanabi	December 14, 2000	Aruze	NeoGeo Pocket Color
Pachi-Slot Aruze Oukoku 4	December 14, 2000	Aruze	PlayStation
Pachi-Slot Aruze Oukoku Pocket: DH2	January 15, 2001	Aruze	NeoGeo Pocket Color
Shadow Hearts	June 28, 2001	Sacnoth	PS2
Pachi-Slot Aruze Oukoku 5	November 15, 2001	Aruze	PlayStation
Pachi-Slot Aruze Oukoku 6	December 13, 2001	Aruze	PS2
Pachi-Slot Aruze Oukoku 7	August 8, 2002	Aruze	PS2
Shadow Hearts: Covenant	February 19, 2004	Nautilus	PS2
Hanabi Hyakkei Advance	July 29, 2004		Game Boy Advance
Don-Chan Puzzle: Hanabi de Don! Advance	July 29, 2004		Game Boy Advance
Aleck Bordon Adventure: Tower & Shaft Advance	November 26, 2004	Altron	Game Boy Advance
Cool 104 Joker & Setline	December 2, 2004		DS
Type Tunes - Chase the Music!	2005		Arcade
Guts da!! Mori no Ishimatsu	March 31, 2005		PS2
Shadow Hearts: From the New World	July 28, 2005	Nautilus	PS2
Pachi-Slot Aruze Oukoku 8	Cancelled	Aruze	PS2
Aoi Don: Hanabi no Kiwami & Hanabi no Takumi	2010	Commseed	DS
Pachinko Aruze Oukoku	Cancelled		PlayStation
The Splizer	Cancelled		PS2
