= Ninja JaJaMaru-kun =

1985 video game

- Japanese Family Computer box art
- Developer: Jaleco
- Publisher: Jaleco
- Platforms: Family Computer; Arcade; MSX; WonderSwan
- Release: Famicom: JP: 15 November 1985; Arcade: JP: April 1986; MSX: JP: 1986; EU: 1987; WonderSwan: JP: 15 April 1999
- Genre: Platform
- Modes: Single-player, multiplayer
- Arcade system: Nintendo VS. System

Ninja JaJaMaru-kun (Note: Japanese: 忍者じゃじゃ丸くん, Hepburn: Ninja JaJaMaru-kun) is an action-platform video game developed and published by Jaleco for the Family Computer. It was released in Japan on 15 November 1985, and was ported to the MSX in 1986. The MSX version was released in Europe as Ninja II, being marketed as a sequel to Ninja-kun: Majou no Bouken, a game that used the name Ninja for its European MSX release.

The game was a commercial success, selling nearly 1 million units. An arcade video game port for the Nintendo VS. System was released in April 1986. A remake, Ganso JaJaMaru-kun, was released in 1999 for the WonderSwan. Ninja JaJaMaru-kun was released for Nintendo's Japanese Virtual Console on 26 December 2006, and in PAL regions on 21 September 2007, as part of Ninja Week for the Hanabi Festival promotion. It was released on the North American Virtual Console on 22 October the same year. The game was released on the Nintendo Switch through the Nintendo Classics service in May 2021.

== Gameplay ==
JaJaMaru-kun has stunned an enemy at the center of the screen in the first level of the game.

In Ninja JaJaMaru-kun, the player takes control of JaJaMaru, who sets out to rescue Princess Sakura from the pirate lord Namazu Dayuu, or "Catfish Pirate". JaJaMaru can run, jump, and throw shurikens at enemies, all of which are taken from Japanese folklore and are introduced before a level begins. Each level has eight enemies total, who give chase to JaJaMaru if he occupies the same floor as them. Defeating enemies will cause their spirit to appear and ascend to the top of the screen, which can be grabbed for additional points. Once all the enemies are defeated, JaJaMaru moves onto the next level.

JaJaMaru can destroy bricks scattered in levels, some of which yield power-ups when destroyed. These include a cart that temporarily makes JaJaMaru invincible, a bottle that allows him to walk through enemies, a red ball that increases speed, coins that yield extra points, and 1UPs. Some bricks contain bombs which will kill JaJaMaru if he touches it. Collecting three different power-ups will summon a giant frog named Gamapa-kun, who JaJaMaru will ride and be completely invincible and be able to eat any nearby enemies. During levels, Sakura will sometimes drop flower petals that can be collected for points, while Namazu will drop deadly bombs. Collecting three petals will transport JaJaMaru to a bonus level, where he must throw shhurikens upward towards Namazu while avoiding his bombs. Bonus points are awarded for hitting Namazu, while hitting a bomb will send the player to the next level instead.

== Development and release ==
Ganso JaJaMaru-kun cover art

Ninja JaJaMaru-kun was developed and published by Jaleco for the Family Computer in Japan on 18 November 1985. The game is a spin-off of Ninja-Kid (1984), an arcade video game originally developed by Japanese company UPL, known for games such as Atomic Robo Kid. Jaleco had previously ported the game to the Famicom in early 1985, and decided to re-use the Ninja-Kid character for their own home console game, now named Ninja JaJaMaru-kun. The name is believed to come from the name of a character from the Japanese educational show Okaasan to Issho, who was named "Fukurokouji JaJaMaru".

A Nintendo VS. System port was released by Jaleco for arcades in April 1986. Ganso JaJaMaru-kun (元祖じゃじゃ丸くん) is a remake of Ninja JaJaMaru-kun released in Japan on 15 April 1999, by Jaleco for the WonderSwan. It is an enhanced version of the original Famicom game with better control, though it uses monochrome graphics due to being an original WonderSwan game.

Ninja JaJaMaru-kun was added as a playable game to the Nintendo Classics service in May 2021.

== Reception ==
Reception

Review scores
Publication	Score
GameSpot	3.5/10
IGN	5/10
Nintendo Life	6/10

Ninja JaJaMaru series
1984	Ninja-Kid
1985	Ninja JaJaMaru-kun
1986	JaJaMaru no Daibouken
1987	Rad Action
1988
1989	JaJaMaru: Ninpō Chō
1990	JaJaMaru Gekimaden: Maboroshi no Kinmajou
1990	Maru's Mission
1991	Ninja Taro
1991	Ninja JaJaMaru: Ginga Daisakusen
1992–1993
1994	Super Ninja-kun
1995–1996
1997	Ninja JaJaMaru-kun: Onigiri Ninpouchou
1998
1999	Ganso JaJaMaru-kun
2000–2002
2003	Ninja JaJaMaru-kun Ranbu
2004	JaJaMaru Jr. Denshōki
2005–2012
2013	Ninja JaJaMaru-kun: Sakura-hime to Karyu no Himitsu
2014–2018
2019	Ninja JaJaMaru: The Great Yokai Battle

By April 1986, it had sold nearly 1 million units, becoming one of the best-selling Family Computer games. In Japan, Game Machine listed VS. Ninja JaJaMaru-kun on their 15 May 1986 issue as being the fifteenth most-successful table arcade unit of the month.

Digital re-releases of Ninja JaJaMaru-kun have received a mediocre reception. GameSpot criticized the game for its simplicity and lacking in its gameplay, which they attributed to the lack of variety between levels and for the intelligence of the enemies remaining the same as the game progressed. While they praised the game for its easy-to-know controls and good music for an early point in the system's life, they said that it was a generally unappealing-looking game and that its gameplay was tedious and boring, mockingly commenting: "Ninja Jajamaru-kun is tedious and ugly, and it actually induces physical discomfort. You'd have to be crazy to dole out six dollars to subject yourself to this kind of pain". Nintendo Life was more positive towards the game, saying that its simplicity actually made the game fun to play. In light of this, they criticized its high difficulty level and repetitive soundtrack. They commented that the game was worth the purchase simply for the fact it had previously remained confined to Japan, but warned potential buyers of its overly-high difficulty. IGN said that, while cute, the game was "quaint at best", and that its simplistic gameplay and lack of a true progression through levels would easily bore players. They also felt confused towards the game's high price point, which they stated was needlessly-high and made it difficult to recommend.

In a 2011 retrospective review, Hardcore Gaming 101 stated that while Ninja JaJaMaru-kun was a fun game, namely with the amount of ways to defeat the enemies, it suffered from choppy sprite animation and stiff controls, although claimed the latter was a significant improvement over the Family Computer port of Ninja-Kid. They said that it had several cute touches, such as the Catfish Pirate laughing at the player at the beginning of each level, and that the music, while repetitive, was catchy and memorable. Retro Gamer called it "a primative, challenging Japanese platformer which becomes a bore quickly", criticizing the game's controls, simplicity, and for the gameplay being boring and lacking in variety. They also wrote that its quality "has the feel of an NES arcade game port in a way", comparing it unfavorably to games like Ghosts 'n Goblins and Super Mario Bros..
