= Paul Charlton (technologist) =

American software and hardware consultant

Paul Charlton is a software and hardware consultant in Silicon Valley. He was a pioneer in developing freeware and open source computer programs. He was the founder of C2B Technologies.

== Timeline of notable technological contributions ==
- 1985 FastTerm - One of the earliest known Freeware and open-source programs for browsing and participating in online communities such as CompuServe, The Source, Delphi and Bulletin Board System networks which pre-dated the existence of the World Wide Web^{,}.
- 1987 Myarc Disk Operating System (MDOS) - operating system for consumer oriented personal computer.
- 1987 Myarc 9640 Geneve - single-board consumer oriented personal computer.
- 1994 QuickTime - market leading multimedia presentation engine for Windows, Mac OS and other platforms.
- 1996 Carbon API for Mac OS - legacy application compatibility on Apple Computer's Darwin Kernel (derived from QTML authored for QuickTime).
- 1996 Created a company named C Innovation which makes the student information system called Zangle.
- 1997 C2B Technologies, Inc - Founder and CTO of company which developed market leading Internet comparison shopping engine, company was acquired in 1998 by Inktomi, which was later acquired by Yahoo
- 1998 Java 2D - key contributor to graphics library distributed by Sun Microsystems as part of its Java developer kits since 1998^{,}.

== Education ==
Charlton received a BS in the disciplines of Electrical, Computer, and Systems Engineering (ECSE) from RPI (Rensselaer Polytechnic Institute)
