= JaJaMaru: Ninpō Chō =

1989 video game

- Developer: Jaleco
- Publisher: Jaleco
- Series: Ninja JaJaMaru
- Platform: Family Computer
- Release: JP: March 28, 1989
- Genre: Role-playing video game
- Mode: Adventure (single-player)

JaJaMaru: Ninpō Chō (じゃじゃ丸忍法帳, JaJaMaru Ninja Arts Register) is a role-playing video game released in Japan on March 28, 1989 by Jaleco for the Family Computer. It is part of Jaleco's Ninja JaJaMaru-kun series and was originally scheduled for a North American release under the name Taro's Quest, although it was never released. Ninja Taro, another game in the series, was localized for America instead.

== Ninja JajaMaru: Ninja Skill Book ==
This game was officially localized in English with the name Ninja JajaMaru: Ninja Skill Book and released in 2023 for the NES and as part of the game collection Ninja JaJaMaru: The Lost RPGs.
