= Maru's Mission =

1990 video game

- North American box art
- Developer: Tose
- Publisher: Jaleco
- Series: Ninja Jajamaru
- Platform: Game Boy
- Release: JP: September 28, 1990; NA: March 1991
- Genre: Platform
- Mode: Single-player

Maru's Mission is a 1990 platform video game developed by Tose and published by Jaleco for the Game Boy. It was released in Japan as I'm Jajamaru! World Adventure (Note: Japanese: おいらじゃじゃ丸！～世界大冒険～, Hepburn: Oira Jajamaru! Sekai Daibōken) on September 28, 1990. The game was released to the Japanese 3DS Virtual Console in January 2012 and later in North America in February.

It is the first game from the Jajamaru series, aside from the loosely related Ninja Taro, to be released in North America, until the release of Ninja JaJaMaru-kun through the Virtual Console. The soundtrack, as well as many sprites and some cut-scenes of the North American version are different from the original Japanese.

== Gameplay ==
Maru's girlfriend Cori is kidnapped and hidden in a secret location. The player is Maru, and moves through six levels based on various folklore monsters.

== Worlds ==
1. North America: A forest
  - Mini boss: Eyeclops
  - Boss battle: Insector
2. Romania: First level is a desert. Second is a cemetery.
  - Mini boss: Wolfman
  - Boss battle: Dracula
3. Greece: An underground bone cavern
  - Mini boss: Golem
  - Boss battle: Medusa
4. Egypt: A desert
  - Mini boss: Sphinx
  - Boss battle: Isis
5. Brazil: First level is a mountain. Second is a cemetery.
  - Mini boss: Hydra
  - Boss battle: Kelbelos
6. Japan: A Ninja dojo
  - Mini boss: Nioh
  - Boss battle: Muramasa

== Ninja JajaMaru: The Great World Adventure ==
In 2023 this game was re-released for the Game Boy Color in English with the name Ninja JajaMaru: The Great World Adventure.
