= Tomy Tutor =

Home computer

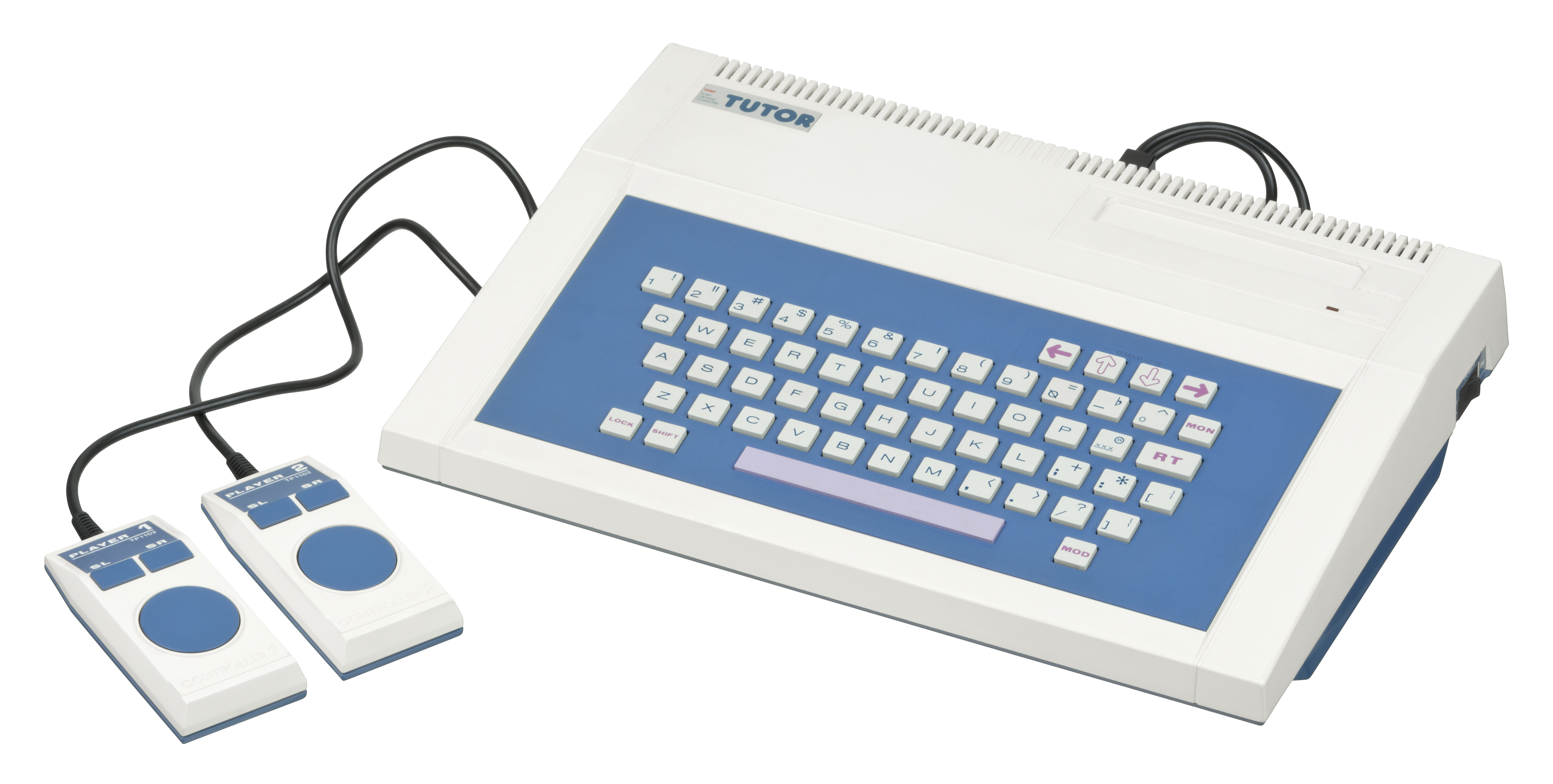
- Tomy Tutor with controllers
- Also known as: Grandstand Tutor (UK); Pyūta (ぴゅう太) (Japan)
- Developer: Tomy
- Manufacturer: Matsushita
- Released: 1982
- Introductory price: ¥59,800 ¥29,800 (Pyūta Jr.) ¥19,800 (Pyūta mk2)
- Discontinued: 1985
- Units shipped: 120,000 (in Japan)
- Media: ROM cartridge, cassette
- Operating system: BASIC
- CPU: TMS9995
- Memory: 20 KB ROM; 16 KB RAM
- Graphics: TMS9918
- Sound: SN76489AN
- Weight: 1.7 kilograms (3.7 lb)
- Successor: Pyuta mk-II

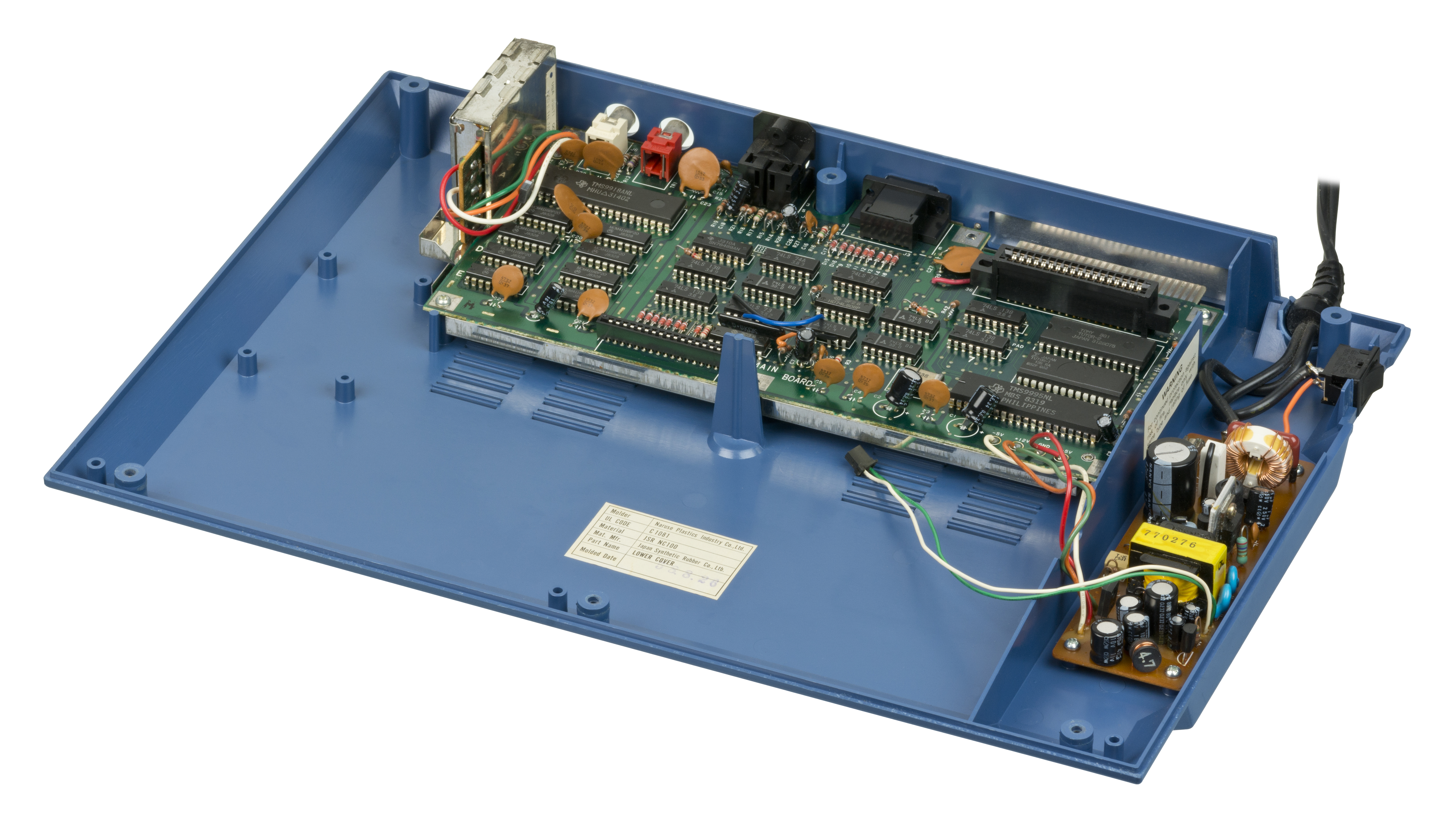
The inside of the Tutor

The Tomy Tutor, originally sold in Japan as the Pyūta (ぴゅう太) and in the UK as the Grandstand Tutor, is a home computer produced by the Japanese toymaker Tomy. It is architecturally similar, but not identical, to the TI-99/4A, and uses a similar Texas Instruments TMS9900 16-bit CPU. The computer was launched in Japan in 1982, and in the UK and the United States in the next year.

== History ==
Produced by Matsushita, the computer was released in Japan in 1982 under the name Pyūta.

Tomy described the Tutor, with 16K RAM, as good for games and education. The company stated that its documentation would let an eight-year-old child use the computer without adult supervision.

One of the major flaws pointed out with the Tutor was not its hardware, but its marketing: the Tutor was announced as a children's computer when in fact it was practically a cheap, evolved version of the TI-99/4A, even having a similar 16-bit CPU (the TMS9995, closely related to the TI-99/4's TMS 9900); other competitors in its price range still used 8-bit microprocessors.

The Pyūta Jr. was a console version of the Pyūta, released in April 1983, and similarly was only sold in Japan.

In Japan, Tomy set a sales target of about 90,000 units and ¥5 billion revenue for the first year by selling Pyūta to elementary and junior high school students as a "drawing computer", having nearly 40,000 units shipped in its first 4 months as of August 1982. However, sales fell sharply when Nintendo released Family Computer (later deployed as Nintendo Entertainment System) in 1983 as a cost-effective option. In February 1985, Tomy ceased its production and withdrew from the market. As of May 1984, a total of 120,000 units were shipped for domestic and export use in Japan.

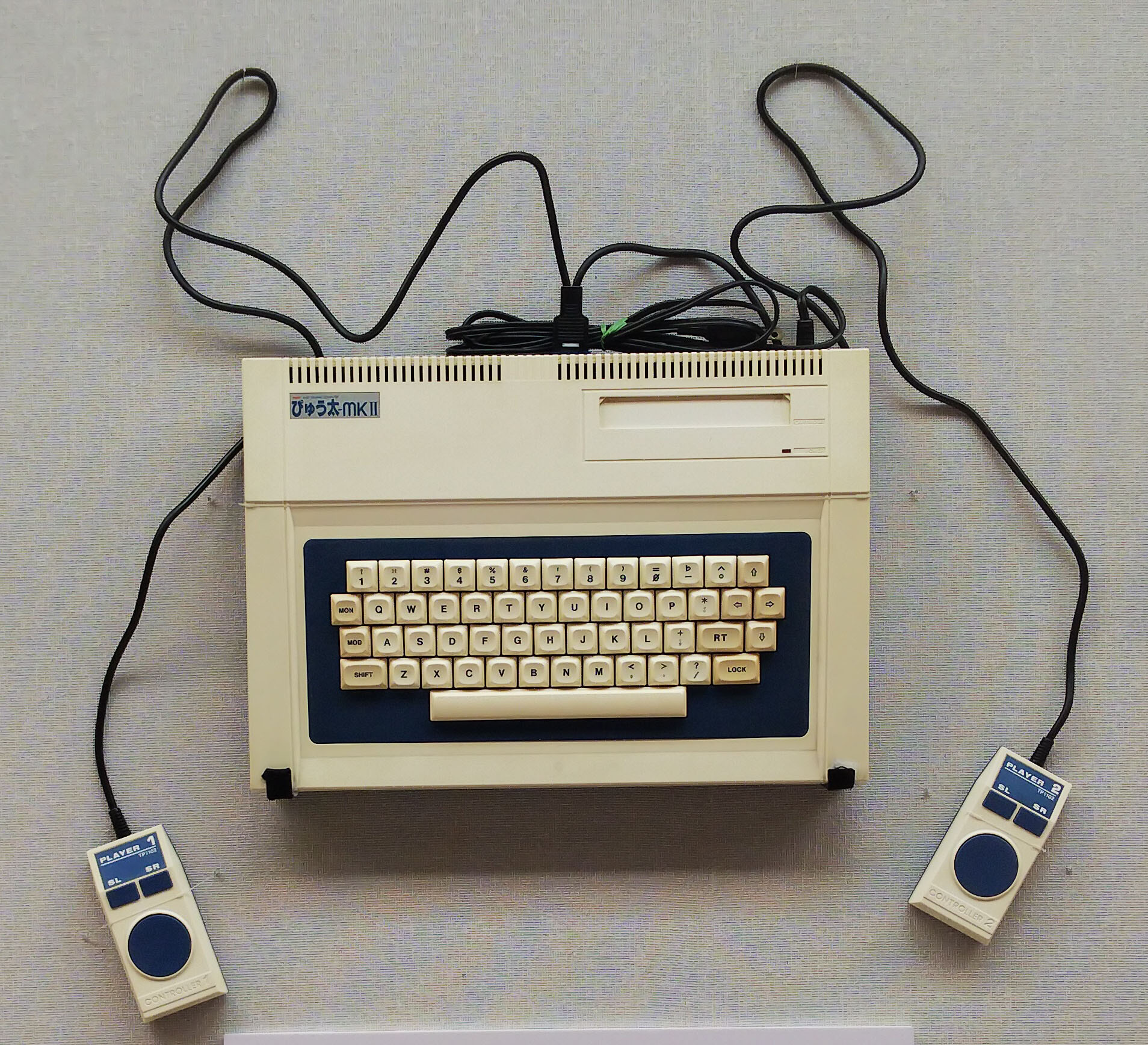
The Pyuta mk-II

On the other hand, the Tutor did not sell well against the ZX Spectrum in the UK and the Commodore 64 in other countries outside Japan. It ended up being removed quickly from the market and replaced the following year by the Pyūta mk2 with a standard mechanical keyboard instead of the original "Chiclet"-style keyboard. However, the new model seems to have been sold only in Japan, and even then only for a short period of time.

== Technical specifications ==
- CPU: Texas Instruments TMS9995
- Video: TMS9918 VDP (Video Display Processor)
  - Resolution: 256 x 192 pixels
  - 16 colors, up to 2 colors out of 8 horizontal dots
  - Up to 32 monochrome sprites of 8 x 8 pixels, max 4 per horizontal line
  - No hardware scrolling function
- Memory: 20 KB ROM built-in, 16 KB RAM (with 256 bytes CPU RAM built-in)
- Keyboard: 56 keys, JIS compliant
- Sounds: SN76489AN DCSG "Digital Complex Sound Generator"
- Weight: 1.7 kilograms (3.7 lb)
- Media: ROM cartridge, cassette
- Expansion: data recorder (optional), game adapter

== List of games ==
- Baseball 3D (Japan-exclusive)
- Battle Fighter 3D (Japan-exclusive)
- Bomb Man (Japan-exclusive)
- Car-azy Racer (USA-exclusive, developed by Wordwright)
- Cave Crawlers (USA)/Maze Patrol (Japan)
- Deep Six (USA)/Marine Adventure (Japan)
- Donpan (Japan-exclusive)
- Frogger (Japan-exclusive port of the 1981 Konami arcade game)
- Hyperspace (USA)/Tron (Japan)
- Jungler (USA/Japan, port of the 1981 Konami arcade game)
- Loco-Motion (USA)/Guttang Gottong (Japan) (port of the 1982 Konami arcade game)
- Mickey Athletic Land (Japan-exclusive)
- Mission Attack (Japan-exclusive)
- Monster Inn (Japan-exclusive)
- Mr. Do! (Japan-exclusive port of the 1982 Universal arcade game)
- Mystery Gold (Japan-exclusive)
- Night Flight (Japan-exclusive)
- Pooyan (USA/Japan, port of the 1982 Konami arcade game)
- Rescue Copter (Japan-exclusive)
- Saurus Land (Japan-exclusive)
- Scramble (USA/Japan, port of the 1981 Konami arcade game)
- Super Bike (Japan-exclusive)
- Torpedo Terror (USA)/Bermuda Triangle (Japan)
- Traffic Jam (USA/Japan)
- Triple Command (Japan-exclusive)
- Turpin (Japan-exclusive port of the 1981 Konami arcade game)
- Yonin Mahjong (Japan-exclusive)
