= Myarc Disk Operating System =

MDOS
- Developer: Myarc, Paul Charlton, MDOS Buyout Group
- Working state: Current version 7.45
- Source model: Open source
- Initial release: 1987; 39 years ago
- Marketing target: Home computer
- Kernel type: Monolithic kernel
- Default user interface: MDOS CLI
- License: Public domain

MDOS (short for Myarc Disk Operating System) is an operating system commercialized by Myarc. It was designed and implemented specifically for the Geneve 9640 by Paul Charlton. MDOS was designed to fully emulate the TI-99/4A computer while providing an advanced (for its time) virtual memory operating environment with full support for mouse, GUI, and complex mathematical applications.

In 1993, Beery Miller the publisher of 9640 News, organized a group of Geneve 9640 owners and was able to purchase all rights to the source code for MDOS, Advanced Basic, the PSYSTEM runtime module, and the GPL Interpreter from Myarc and Paul Charlton.

Over the years, MDOS has been updated by individuals including T. Tesch, Clint Pulley, Alan Beard, John Johnson, James Schroeder, Mike Maksimik, James Uzzell, Tony Knerr, Beery Miller, and others. Support adding SCSI, IDE, and larger ramdisks were added in the earlier years from the buyout. In late 2020 and early 2021 with the release of the TIPI for the TI-99/4A, the Geneve was interfaced with the TIPI and a Raspberry Pi providing TCP socket access and nearly unlimited high speed hard-drive like file access.

A small but active base of users still exist on www.Atariage.com as of 2021 where T. Tesch, Beery Miller, and others provide support.

MDOS was written specifically for the TMS9995 16-bit CPU and the Yamaha V9938 video display processor.

All source code for the Geneve 9640 is in the public domain.
