= Mr. Do's Castle =

1983 video game

- Developer: Universal
- Publisher: Universal
- Series: Mr. Do
- Platforms: Arcade, Atari 2600, Atari 5200, Atari 8-bit, MSX, ColecoVision, Commodore 64
- Release: September 1983
- Genre: Platform
- Modes: Single-player, multiplayer

Mr. Do's Castle, released in Japan as Mr. Do! vs. Unicorns (Note: Japanese: ミスタードゥvsユニコーンズ, Hepburn: Misutādo~u Vs Yunikōnzu), is a 1983 platform video game developed and published by Universal for arcades. Marketed as a sequel to the original Mr. Do! released one year earlier, the game bears a far closer resemblance to Universal's Space Panic from 1980. It began as a game called Knights vs. Unicorns, but the U.S. division of Universal persuaded the Japanese arm to modify the graphics into a Mr. Do! game following the first game's popularity.

== Gameplay ==
Mr. Do is on the lowest platform while four unicorns roam the level (arcade).

The object of Mr. Do's Castle is to score as many points as possible by collecting cherries and/or defeating unicorn-like monsters. The game takes place in a castle filled with platforms and ladders – reminiscent of Space Panic (1980) – some of which can be flipped from one platform to another, much like a kickstand on a bicycle. The player controls Mr. Do as he collects cherries by using a hammer to knock out blocks that contain them from the various platforms. Empty holes left by the knocked-out blocks serve as traps for the monsters – if a monster falls into a hole, the player can then defeat it by causing a block above the monster to fall on top of it (and additional points are scored if such a monster falls multiple levels en route to its destruction). If the player takes too long to complete a level, the monsters transform into faster, more difficult forms – at first green in color, later blue – that rapidly multiply once they turn blue. The game advances to the next level when all cherries on the level have been collected or all enemies have been defeated. The player loses a life if Mr. Do is caught by a monster, and the game ends when the player runs out of lives.

As in Mr. Do!, the player can earn an extra life by collecting all of the letters from the word "EXTRA". Regular monsters can be changed into monsters bearing the EXTRA letters by collecting all three keys distributed around the playfield and then picking up a magic shield from the top floor. Monsters in this state are easier to defeat than normal; a simple hammer strike will do the job. After a brief interval, they change back into their normal forms. The game also offers a bonus credit for collecting a rare diamond that appears on the playfield at random intervals.

The cherry blocks are absent from Mr. Do Vs. Unicorns and early revisions of Mr. Do's Castle. Instead, blocks that are not keys or skulls at the start of a stage will be fill blocks (those left behind when unicorns fall into holes and are left alone for a time). Because of this, there are only three ways to complete a level in this version, versus the four ways to complete levels in Mr. Do's Castle. In addition, in these early revisions, the fill blocks change colors every two stages.

== Ports ==
Mr. Do's Castle was ported to the ColecoVision, MSX, Atari 2600, Atari 5200, Atari 8-bit computers, Commodore 64, and X68000. The Atari, Commodore, and ColecoVision were published by Parker Brothers.

Hamster Corporation released the game as part of their Arcade Archives series for the Nintendo Switch and PlayStation 4, as well as their Arcade Archives 2 series for the Nintendo Switch 2, PlayStation 5 and Xbox Series X/S in September 2026.

== Reception ==
In Japan, Game Machine listed Mr. Do's Castle on their October 1, 1983 issue as being the second most-successful new table arcade unit of the month.

Gene Lewin of Play Meter magazine reviewed the arcade game, scoring it 9 out of 10.

== Legacy ==
Mr. Do's Castle was followed up by Mr. Do's Wild Ride and Do! Run Run, both released in 1984.
