= Mouser (video game) =

1983 video game

- North American arcade flyer
- Developer: Universal Playland
- Publishers: JP: Universal Playland; NA: Cosmos
- Designer: Ryuichi Nishizawa
- Platforms: Arcade, MSX
- Release: JP: February 1983; NA: April 1983
- Genre: Platform
- Modes: Single-player, multiplayer

Mouser (Note: Japanese: マウサー, Hepburn: Mausā) is a 1983 platform video game developed and published by Universal Playland for arcades. It was released in Japan in February 1983 and in North America in April 1983 by Cosmos. It was designed by Ryuichi Nishizawa, who would later found Escape and create the Wonder Boy series. It was ported to the MSX by Sony.

Hamster Corporation acquired the game's rights alongside UPL's catalogue and released the game as part of their Arcade Archives series for the Nintendo Switch and PlayStation 4 in March 2024, as well as the Arcade Archives 2 series for the Nintendo Switch 2, PlayStation 5, Xbox Series X/S and Windows in July 2026.

== Gameplay ==
The player controls a cat who must rescue their love interest from mice. The cat must navigate a series of single-screen platform levels through ladders in a manner similar to Donkey Kong (1981). The cat can capture blue mice by touching them, but pink mice defeats the cat on contact. Pink mice throw a plethora of objects such as cheese, bouncy balls and bombs which kill the cat on contact, but can grant points if jumped over. Catching enough blue mice will spawn a ladder that allows access to the top of the level in order to complete it. Fish appear throughout the level and grant bonus points depending on their color.
