= Sorcerer's Kingdom =

- North American cover art
- Developer: Technical Wave
- Publishers: JP: Masaya; NA: Treco
- Composers: Koichi Shimamura; Mami Tanaka
- Platform: Sega Genesis
- Release: JP: February 7, 1992; NA: May 1993
- Genre: Tactical RPG
- Mode: Single-player

Sorcerer's Kingdom (ソーサルキングダム; "Sorcer Kingdom") is a tactical RPG developed by Technical Wave and released for the Sega Genesis in 1992. It was localized for North America by Treco.

== Gameplay ==
During battle, a character must be next to an enemy in order to use a physical attack.

Sorcerer's Kingdom allows players to control a party of characters and guide them through dungeons and battles. The game features tactical RPG elements such as turn-based movement during battle along a grid. Each character can either move, use an item or, spell, defend, or attack an enemy that is next to them when it is their turn. If an enemy is not in an adjacent space, the character can move next to them in order to use a physical attack with their equipped weapon or use a spell to cause damage from a distance.

The game has no experience point system and allows characters to increase their stats as they battle certain ways. By continually using spells, for instance, a character's magic stat will increase after the enemies in a battle are all defeated. Each turn, the player may only move one party member, while every enemy in the battle may act.

== Plot ==
In the world of Sorcerer's Kingdom, a line of kings have encouraged young men with riches and titles to become adventurers and explore the world. Monsters begin appearing in villages and it is up to these heroes to defeat them and stop evil from spreading. By collecting all the Spirits of the world, the heroes are able to seal the evil and prevent it from returning.
