= Koutetsu Yousai Strahl =

1992 video game

Koutestu Yousai Strahl
- Developer: UPL
- Publisher: UPL
- Platform: Arcade
- Release: 1992
- Genre: Scrolling shooter
- Modes: Single-player, multiplayer

Koutetsu Yousai Strahl (Note: Japanese: 鋼鉄要塞 シュトラール, Hepburn: Kōtetsu Yōsai Shutorāru; lit. "Steel Fortress Strahl") is a 1992 horizontally scrolling shooter video game developed and published by UPL. Released only in Japan by Taito in January 1992, it was the last game to be released by UPL in arcades prior to its closure. Hamster Corporation acquired the rights to the game alongside UPL's intellectual property; they released the game outside Japan for the first time as part of their Arcade Archives series for the Nintendo Switch and PlayStation 4 in July 2020.

== Story ==
The game takes place in modern times where a great depression has swept over the world. Amidst the depression and its riots of jobless workers, a mad scientist started his plan of world domination. Taking command in the titular steel fortress orbiting Earth, the evil doctor Gegeben von Funkeln uses his own robots and mercenaries in a society called the "Eisern Geist" to wreak havoc across the globe until all his demands are met. Assisting the attacked and weakened governments, workers across the nations helped develop a series of bombers to use against the forces of Dr. Funkeln and save the world. However, after 3 months of the war, the Eisern Geist had destroyed all but one of the bombers. The remaining bomber continues the attack on the Eisern Geist and Strahl.

== Gameplay ==
Before each stage begins, players are given a choice of weapons to purchase at a hangar. There are four weapons within three tiers to choose from including Main Attack, Sub Weapon and Bomb. Of the Main Attack the player can choose Twin Shot, Laser, Heavy Laser and the Charge Shot. Of the Sub Weapons, players can choose Vulcan Missiles, Homing Missiles, Shields or Expand, an energy barrier. Of the Bombs, players can stock up on multiple bombs including Small Bombs, Rockets, Big Bombs or Napalms.

The bomber provides tactical advantages during combat with the use of its manually directional Sub Weapon. Players are able to direct additional firepower in five directions including vertical and horizontal by pressing the Bomb button while firing. The game runs for six stages through various settings such as a jungle, stormy skies, Tokyo and Strahl itself.

== Reception ==
In Japan, Game Machine listed Koutetsu Yousai Strahl on their March 15, 1992 issue as being the eighteenth most-successful table arcade unit at the time.
