= Jungler =

1981 video game

- North American arcade flyer
- Developer: Konami
- Publishers: JP: Konami; NA: Stern Electronics
- Platforms: Arcade, Tomy Tutor, Arcadia 2001
- Release: NA: February 1982; JP: April 1982
- Genre: Maze
- Modes: Single-player, multiplayer

Jungler (Note: Japanese: ジャングラー, Hepburn: Jangurā) is a 1982 maze video game developed and published by Konami for arcades. It was released by Stern in North America. A sequel titled Battle Jungler was planned for the PC Engine on 1992, but was cancelled.

== Gameplay ==
The player controls the white creature. The others are enemies.

In Jungler, the player controls a white, multi-segmented animal inside a blue maze. Also inside the maze are three enemy creatures similar to that of the player. The object of the game is to eliminate the enemy creatures before one of them eliminates the player. When all three enemies are defeated, the player advances to the next maze.

The enemy creatures appear in one of three colors: red, yellow or green. Red creatures are longer in length than the player, and as such a collision with the creature will cost the player one life. Yellow creatures are the same length as the player, thus posing no harm upon a collision. Green creatures are shorter than the player, and will be devoured by the player's creature if they collide. The player can shoot at the creatures, with each hit reducing the number of segments by one. As segments are removed, the creatures are able to move faster, thus making them harder to catch and eliminate.

Points are scored for shooting the creatures, as well as for collecting pieces of fruit that appear in the maze at random locations. These fruits will also add an extra segment to the player's creature.

== Ports ==
The only contemporary home system ports of Jungler were by Emerson for the Tomy Tutor in 1981 and also for Emerson's Arcadia 2001 console in 1982. Gakken made a tabletop handheld game of Jungler in 1982 as part of a series of flip-top games with VFD screen and magnifying Fresnel lens.

Hamster Corporation released the game as part of their Arcade Archives series for the Nintendo Switch and PlayStation 4 in February 2024.

== Legacy ==
Much in the way that Space Panic remained obscure, but a home clone from Broderbund was a hit in the guise of Apple Panic, the Jungler concept found success in a computer clone, also from Broderbund: Serpentine. Squirm is a 1984 clone for the Commodore 64 by Mastertronic.

== World record ==
In May 1983, Joe Startz of Kenosha, Wisconsin, set the Jungler world record with a score of 180,720 points.
