= Galaxy Wars =

1979 video game

- Arcade flyer
- Developer: Universal
- Publisher: Taito
- Platform: Arcade
- Release: 1979
- Genre: Fixed shooter
- Modes: Single-player, multiplayer

Galaxy Wars is a fixed shooter arcade video game developed by Universal and published by Taito in 1979.

== Gameplay ==
Galaxy Wars Arcade game screen shot

The player depresses the fire button for a missile. The missile speed increases when depressing the fire button continuously. The player guides the missile from a stationary launch pad to the top of the screen to blow up the invading fleet of armed UFOs while dodging meteorites and bombs. Points are awarded for blowing up various ships and range from 50-550 depending on the ship. There is a bonus chance of 600 points for one pattern. After clearing a level or "pattern" as the back of the flyer calls it, the player was rewarded with messages like "Good!!" after 3 screens cleared, "Very Good!!" after 7 screens cleared, "Wonderful!!" after 10 screens cleared, and "Fantastic!!" after 15 screens cleared. Players who failed to score any points were told to "Give Up!!" A launcher appears every 3,000 additional points (5,000 if the adjustment is made in the controlling dip switches in the arcade cabinet).

The game has a 1up and 2up player score and High Score tallied at the top of the screen.

The arcade cabinet has one joystick to move the launcher left to right and guide the missiles.

== Reception ==
Dave Albert reviewed Galaxy Wars in The Space Gamer No. 43. Albert commented that "Galaxy is fun to play, as much fun as any Invaders-type game I have seen."
