= Geneve 9640 =

Enhanced TI-99/4A clone

- Type: Home computer
- Released: 1987; 39 years ago
- Operating system: MDOS
- CPU: Texas Instruments TMS9995 @ 12 MHz
- Memory: 640K RAM
- Storage: Floppy Disks
- Display: Composite video, RGB output; 512x424 (16 colors), 512x212 (16 colors), 256x424 (256 colors), 256x212 (256 colors)
- Graphics: Yamaha V9938
- Sound: SN76496
- Input: IBM PC XT keyboard
- Controller input: IBM PC XT mouse

The Geneve 9640 is an enhanced TI-99/4A computer-on-a-card upgrade. It was sold by Myarc as a card to fit into the Texas Instruments TI Peripheral Expansion System. Released in 1987, it is in many ways similar to the earlier TI-99/8, which was in prototype form in early 1983. The Geneve 9640 was designed by Paul Charlton, and the graphical swan on the boot up screen was designed by Mi-Kyung Kim.

== Hardware ==
The Geneve 9640 features a 16-bit TMS9995 processor clocked at 12 MHz.

A Yamaha V9938 video display processor (the same one used in the MSX2 family of home computers) provides 256-color graphics at a 256×424 resolution, 16-color graphics at a 512×424, and an 80-column text mode.

Audio is produced via an SN76496 programmable sound generator capable of producing three simultaneous square waves at sixteen different volume levels, as well as an additional noise channel that could produce either periodic or white noise in three different frequencies and at sixteen different volumes.

Onboard memory consists of 512 KB CPU RAM, which can be upgraded to at least 2 MB through the use of the Myarc Memex Expansion Card or similar. The card also has as 128 KB video RAM.

The board includes a battery-backed real time clock (RTC). An IBM PC XT compatible detached keyboard and a mouse are used for input. The Geneve 9640 is compatible with nearly all software written for the TI-99/4A. An adapter was made by a company named Rave to allow the sidecar-only Speech Synthesizer to be installed inside the Peripheral Expansion System.

== Software ==
The following software is bundled with the Geneve:

- Cartridge Saver, allowing most cartridges to be saved to and run from disk
- GPL, a program used to set up a 99/4A environment to run software saved by Cartridge Saver or most other 99/4A-specific software
- Advanced BASIC, supporting 80 columns and compatible with TI BASIC and TI Extended BASIC
- Pascal Runtime (not officially released by Myarc)
- TI-Writer Word Processor, upgraded to 80 columns and increased speed
- Microsoft Multiplan, upgrade to 80 columns, increased memory, and increased speed
- Myarc Disk Operating System

In 1993, Beery Miller, the publisher of 9640 News, organized a group of Geneve 9640 owners and was able to purchase all rights to the source code for MDOS, Advanced Basic, the PSYSTEM runtime module, and the GPL Interpreter from Myarc and Paul Charlton.

Over the years, MDOS has been updated by individuals including Tim Tesch, Clint Pulley, Alan Beard, John Johnson, James Schroeder, Mike Maksimik, James Uzzell, Tony Knerr, Beery Miller, and others. Support for SCSI, IDE, and larger ramdisks was added in the earlier years after the buyout. In late 2020 and early 2021, with the release of the TIPI for the TI-99/4A, the Geneve was interfaced with the TIPI and a Raspberry PI providing TCP socket access and nearly unlimited high speed hard-drive-like file access.

A small but active base of users still exist on www.atariage.com as of 2021, where Tim Tesch, Beery Miller, and others provide support.
