= Acrobat Mission =

1991 video game

- Super Famicom box art
- Developers: UPL; Super Famicom; Micronics
- Publisher: Arcade; Taito; Super Famicom: JP: Teichiku
- Platforms: Arcade, Super Famicom
- Release: Arcade: WW: 1991; Super Famicom: JP: 1992
- Genre: Scrolling shooter
- Modes: Single-player, multiplayer

Acrobat Mission is a 1991 vertically scrolling shooter arcade video game developed by UPL and published by Taito. A port to the Super Famicom developed by Micronics was released in 1992.

== Gameplay ==
Players start the game equipped with the default weapon, the Standard Shot: a semi-automatic laser weapon. Though moderately powerful, the Standard Shot cannot be upgraded or charged. Once the player has lost a significant number of lives and their selected weapon his lost its upgrades, the Standard Shot will once again take over.

Two other weapons are selectable to the player, one of which is the Wave Shot (Wide in the Arcade version). The Wave Shot is a spread shot that increases in size, numbers and strength. When charged, the Wave Shot can unleash a short range, but powerful laser blast that increases in width and strength when Wave icons are collected. The other weapon is the Hurricane Shot, a unique area-effect weapon that encircles the ship clockwise when fired before flying forward. When charged, the Hurricane Shot fires a ball of energy across the screen, but there is a one-second delay every time the shot is fired.

The player also has Bombs although unlike many shooters, the player can only hold up to two bombs. Once collected however, the two bombs get physically mounted under the ship's wings. If an enemy shot hits one of the bombs, then the bomb will detonate, creating a destructive shield for the player. The player can manually detonate either bomb at will.

The player's Icarus fighter ship has a number of defenses at its disposal as well. Whenever the player moves their ship in any given direction, a burst of flame from the ship's jet exhaust will shoot out from the opposite direction the player moves the ship in. This applies to all directions: left, right, front, back and all four diagonal angles. This jet exhaust not only serves an aesthetic purpose, but it can also harm nearby enemies and destroy nearby objects.

Whenever the player is hit, their ship will steer wildly out of control. Once this happens, a timer will appear near the ship which indicates how long the ship has until it explodes. The explosion of the player's ship will harm any nearby enemies. Also, because the Icarus is apparently well built, any kamikaze enemies or drifting objects that touch it will not damage or destroy the player's ship, allowing the player less restrictive movement.

== Reception ==
In Japan, Game Machine listed Acrobat Mission on their September 1, 1991 issue as being the fourteenth most-successful table arcade unit of the month.

== Record ==
Antonio R. Filho (Brazil) holds the official world record for this game with a maximum 279.900 points.
