= Fighting Masters =

1991 video game

- Developers: Aicom; ALU
- Publisher: Treco
- Directors: Hajime Kusano; Ramō Kobayashi
- Producer: Robb Alvey (Uncredited)
- Designers: Masahiko Ujita; Yasuo Wakatsuki
- Programmers: Toshiyuki Nishimura; Yazawa
- Artists: Masami Takizawa; Naoyuki Hayakawa; T. Shigemura
- Composers: Hiromitsu Shioya; Masaki Kase
- Platform: Sega Genesis
- Release: JP: December 6, 1991; NA: February 1992
- Genre: Fighting
- Modes: Single-player, multiplayer

Fighting Masters (Note: Japanese: ファイティング マスターズ, Hepburn: Faitingu Masutāzu) is a 1991 fighting video game developed by Aicom and ALU, and published by Treco for the Sega Genesis. In the game, players assume the role of a hero to fight against an assortment of opponents on an apocalyptic setting to face against an entity known as Lord Valgasu. Co-directed by Hajime Kusano and Ramō Kobayashi, the title was created by some of the same team that would later work on various projects at Almanic Corporation such as E.V.O.: Search for Eden. It was met with mixed reception from critics since its release.

== Gameplay ==
Gameplay screenshot showcasing a match between Dirk and Mastodon

Fighting Masters is a fighting game where the player fights against other opponents in one-on-one matches and the fighter who manages to deplete the health bar of the opponent wins the bout, becoming the winner of the match.

In single-player mode, players can choose from twelve playable characters and fight against computer-controlled fighters. Three buttons are available in the game: block (A), attack (B) and jump (C). The d-pad cannot be used to jump directly, instead, players have to walk in a certain direction and press the jump button to perform said action. The attack button allows players to perform various attacks, special moves and combos. Besides the single-player mode, other modes include matches against another human opponent or a watch mode to view a fight between two CPU-controlled opponents.

== Synopsis ==
=== Plot ===
Fighting Masters takes place in a pre-apocalyptic universe, where an enormous red sun is about to go supernova within hours, leading representatives from multiple alien races to fight against each other to gain trust and service of an ultra-intelligent race known as Primaries, who will grant another galaxy to live in for them and their future generations. However, the in-game plot tells a different story involving a demon lord known as Lord Valgasu, who leads an underground campaign against a twelve-star galaxy to take control of it, conquering all of the stars' rulers and making them his slaves except one. Assuming the role of a lone hero, the player battles against the enslaved rulers and Valgasu himself.

=== Characters ===
Some of the character's names were changed between the North American and Japanese releases:

- Larry/Dirk – A human lightweight wrestler.
- Elepha/Mastodon – An anthropomorphic elephant.
- Flamer/Equus – An anthropomorphic kickboxing horse.
- Morin – An amazon warrior who fights with a tonfa.
- Beowolf/Grinder – A razor-clawed machine.
- Goldrock – A living golem with an Egyptian motif.
- Tomahawk/Phoenix – An anthropomorphic hawk-like griffin.
- Zrygunte/Zygrunt – An anthropomorphic lobster.
- Medusa/Rotundo – A Jellyfish creature.
- Drason/Xenon – A fire-breathing dragon.
- DIO – A sentient man-eating plant.
- Eyesight/Uppercut – A cyclops boxer.

== Development and release ==
Fighting Masters was created, along with Aicom and ALU, by some of the staff members that would later work on various projects at Almanic Corporation such as E.V.O.: Search for Eden for SNES. Both Hajime Kusano and Ramō Kobayashi assisted as directors, with Taito's Superman director Toshiyuki Nishimura and a member under the pseudonym of "Yazawa" serving as programmers. Masahiko Ujita, Masami Takizawa, Naoyuki Hayakawa, T. Shigemura, Toshiyuki Nishimura and Yasuo Wakatsuki acted as artists and designers respectively. Both Masaki "Masapi" Kase and Hiromitsu Shioya worked as sound designers.

Fighting Masters was first released in Japan on December 6, 1991, and later in North America in February 1992 by Treco.

== Reception ==
Reception

Review scores
Publication	Score
Computer and Video Games	91%
GamesMaster	65%
Beep! Mega Drive	6.5/10
Consoles +	72%
Entertainment Weekly	B+
Games-X	2.5/5
Génération 4	84%
Hippon Super!	70/100
Joystick	82%
Mean Machines	81%
Mega	50% 20%
Mega Drive Advanced Gaming	44%
MegaTech	86% 84/100
Power Play	17%
Sega Pro	66/100; 30%

Entertainment Weekly gave the game a B+, writing that "As artlessly crowd-pleasing as a Golden Gloves tournament, this high-energy slugfest has you sparring with, and stepping into the ring as, a motley assortment of aliens (my faves are Dio, a head-chomping carnivorous plant, and Rotundo, who looks like a cross between the Michelin Man and George Foreman). The battles are quick, they're vicious, and they're over fast — which alone gives Fighting Masters an easy TKO over its video-game competition." Video game magazine Mega gave the game a score of 20% in their December 1993 issue. AllGame gave it a rating of 3 stars out of a possible 5.
