= Super Don Quix-ote =

- Four in-game screenshots from Super Don Quix-ote
- Developer: Universal
- Publisher: Universal
- Platform: Arcade
- Release: EU: October 1984; JP: November 1984; NA: February 1985
- Genre: Interactive film
- Arcade system: Universal System 1

Super Don Quix-ote (スーパードンキホーテ Sūpā Don Kihōte) is an arcade LaserDisc video game released by Universal in 1984. In it, the player controls the knight Don as he attempts to rescue a princess from an evil witch named Leona.

Super Don Quix-ote is loosely based on the novel Don Quixote, while the LaserDisc format is similar to other LaserDisc games such as Dragon's Lair and Space Ace. The major difference that set Super Don Quix-ote apart is an overlaid icon indicating the time and direction of each correct quick time event input, whereas all other LaserDisc games at the time gave no indication of correct moves, except an occasional "flash" incorporated into the animation itself.

== Plot ==
The game is loosely inspired by its namesake, Don Quixote, and features a heroic young knight named Don on a quest to save his love, the fair princess Isabella, who has been kidnapped by Leona, a wicked witch, for human sacrifice to a demon. Don is accompanied on his travels by a donkey (based on Rocinante, the original Don Quixote's horse) and a fat little man named Sancho (based on Don Quixote's trusty sidekick, Sancho Panza).

The closest parallel to the original tale is a scene in which Don fights a giant at a windmill, but the rest of the game pits him against a mummy, a dragon, skeletons, demons, giant snakes, flying electric jellyfish, an animated totem pole, Leona's daughter, and other scenarios with no relation to the original story. The game ends when Don kills Leona and rescues Isabella, and they escape Leona's castle as it is destroyed.

== Universal System 1 ==
Super Don Quix-ote was the first and only game released for the Universal System 1, a standardized LaserDisc video game system. Several other games were planned for this cabinet, but were never released: Adventure in Middle Earth, Adventure Mr. Do!, Time Slip, Circus Circus, Space Dracula, and Wilderness Kingdom.

Another LaserDisc game from Universal following a similar flashing quick-time event format was Captain Zapp, which had a motorbike vehicular combat theme. It was the only LaserDisc game to be demonstrated at London's Associated Leisure Preview '86 (Arcadia '86) show in October 1985.

== Reception ==
In Japan, Game Machine listed Super Don Quix-ote on their December 15, 1984 issue as being the most-successful upright arcade unit of the month.

Computer and Video Games magazine gave it a generally positive review in December 1984, stating the "movements of all the characters are very smooth and beautifully depicted" with praise for the arrows and signs; though the reviewer didn't think the game "is as much fun" as Dragon's Lair, the review said Don Quix-ote is "a lot less frustrating" than the former game. Mike Roberts gave it a highly positive review in the April 1985 issue of Computer Gamer magazine, calling it the "latest masterpiece" LaserDisc game and stating that it improves on Dragon's Lair and Space Ace in terms of the graphics and playability, with the flashing hints making the gameplay clearer and less confusing than earlier LaserDisc games.
