= Serpentine (video game) =

1982 video game

- Publishers: Broderbund; Creative Software (VIC)
- Programmer: David Snider
- Platforms: Apple II, Atari 8-bit, Commodore 64, IBM PC, VIC-20
- Release: 1982
- Genre: Maze
- Mode: Single-player

Serpentine is a maze video game written by David Snider for the Apple II and published by Broderbund in 1982. Serpentine's gameplay and visuals are similar to Konami's arcade video game, Jungler, released the previous year. It was ported to the Commodore 64 and Atari 8-bit computers. A VIC-20 version was licensed to Creative Software.

== Gameplay ==
Atari 8-bit screenshot

The player controls (rides, by game description) a multi-segmented blue 'good' serpent in a maze with the objective of eating all computer-controlled 'evil' (red or orange or green) serpents. Eating the tail segments of serpents makes them shorter, and a red or orange serpent turns green when shorter than the player. Hitting a green serpent headfirst eliminates it, and causes the player's serpent to grow an additional segment. Hitting a red or orange serpent headfirst causes the player's serpent to die. A frog appears at random intervals and gives any serpent eating it an additional segment. Once all opponents have been eliminated, the player's serpent automatically returns to a protected area.

As the game progresses, opposing serpents are faster and longer, increasing the difficulty, and each advancing level the existing players serpent gets slower. If the player's serpent dies, the replacement regains its original speed, but loses any additional segments gained by the previous incarnation.

One unique aspect of the game is how extra lives are gained. The playing serpent will lay an egg (losing a segment in the process) and, if the egg is still on screen when the player re-enters the protected area at the end of a level, the egg hatches into another serpent, which hurries to the protected area. Enemy serpents will also lay eggs; if one hatches, a new two-segment opponent appears. It is possible to lose the last segment to an egg, resulting in the death of that serpent, but this can only happen to the player's serpent. If a frog happens to appear while an egg is on the map, it will head towards the egg and eat it as well. This will occur even at the end of a level when the player's serpent is operating on autopilot, making the choice of position where the last enemy serpent is killed tactically important.

Most versions of the game include 20 different mazes, but the Atari cartridge version only has 5.

== Reception ==
Serpentine ranked #13 for most popular game of 1982 according to Softalk magazine.

Softline in 1982 called Serpentine "devilishly addicting, being endowed with the qualities that make arcade games worth the bother". Michael Cranford reviewed the game for Computer Gaming World, and stated that "in my opinion, Serpentine is far better than the sum of its inspirations". The Commodore 64 Home Companion in 1984 said that "it's easy to get hooked on this one". InfoWorld's Essential Guide to Atari Computers cited it as among the best Broderbund arcade games.

Karl Westerholm reviewed Serpentine in Space Gamer No. 65. Westerholm commented that "Serpentine is unquestionably a game worth owning, and if there are any weaknesses or bugs, I have yet to find them. I definitely recommend this game, as it promises to provide fun and excitement for a very long time".
