= Eggs (video game) =

1983 video game

- Developer: Technōs Japan
- Publishers: JP: Roller Tron; NA: Universal Entertainment
- Platform: Arcade
- Release: JP: June 1983; NA: September 1983
- Genre: Maze
- Modes: Single-player, multiplayer

Eggs, released in Japan as Scrambled Egg (Note: Japanese: スクランブル・エッグ, Hepburn: Sukuranburu Eggu), is a 1983 maze video game developed by Technōs Japan for arcades. One of the first games to be released by Technōs, it was released in Japan by Roller Tron in June 1983 and in North America by Universal Entertainment in September 1983. Hamster Corporation released the game as part of their Arcade Archives series for the Nintendo Switch and PlayStation 4, as well as their Arcade Archives 2 series for the Nintendo Switch 2, PlayStation 5 and Xbox Series X/S in August 2025.

== Gameplay ==
The player controls a creature who aims to hatch all the eggs scattered throughout the maze by kicking them until the chicks are exposed. Enemy creatures roam the level; they can be stunned by shooting them with the player character's eyes or defeated by hitting them with the eggs or chicks. The chicks can be poisoned by enemies when coming in contact (outside of being kicked), preventing the player from gaining extra points after freeing the chicks.
