= Task Force Harrier =

1989 video game

- North American arcade flyer
- Developers: NMK; Jorudan (console)
- Publishers: Arcade: JP: UPL; NA: Sammy; Sega Genesis; Treco
- Composer: Tenpei Sato
- Platforms: Arcade, Sega Genesis
- Release: Arcade: JP: October 1989; NA: November 1989; Mega Drive/Genesis: JP: December 20, 1991; NA: May 1992
- Genre: Scrolling shooter
- Mode: Single-player

Task Force Harrier (Note: Japanese: タスクフォースハリアー, Hepburn: Tasuku Fōsu Hariā) is a 1989 vertical scrolling shooter video game developed by NMK and published by UPL for arcades. It was released in Japan in October 1989 and in North America by Sammy in November 1989. It was ported to the Sega Genesis by Jorudan and Treco as Task Force Harrier EX (Note: Japanese: タスクフォースハリアーＥＸ, Hepburn: Tasuku Fōsu Hariā EX) on December 20, 1991 in Japan and North America in May 1992. Hamster Corporation released the game as part of their Arcade Archives series for the Nintendo Switch and PlayStation 4 in May 2021.

== Gameplay ==
The game is a conventional scrolling shooter, in which your mission is to penetrate a hostile communist military force situated inside Russian territory. The player takes control of a Harrier fighter jet with two types of main weapons. The first type can only shoot flying opponents, such as enemy planes and copters; the second, a bomb-type weapon, can only hit ground enemies, such as tanks and turrets. The player can also acquire escorts to increase firepower. Changing the formation of the escort fighters results in different shot patterns and also affects the maneuvering speed.

== See also ==
- Omega Fighter
