= Treco =

American video game company

Treco Corporation Limited
- Type: Subsidiary
- Industry: Video games
- Defunct: 1993; 33 years ago
- Fate: Absorbed by Sammy Corporation
- Headquarters: Torrance, California, United States
- Parent: Sammy Corporation

Treco, also credited as Treco Corporation Limited, American Treco and Treco, USA, was a video game publisher located in Torrance, California. Treco produced games for the Sega Genesis/Mega Drive from 1990 to 1993. Treco was a subsidiary of Sammy Corporation.

After UPL Company Limited went bankrupt, Treco would port some of their games to the Sega Genesis platform.

== Games ==
- Warsong (1991): English translation of the NCS/Masaya game Langrisser I
- Fighting Masters (1991)
- Sorcerer's Kingdom (1992), (1993): English translation of the NCS game Sorcer Kingdom

=== Arcade ports ===
Treco released Mega Drive ports of the following arcade games:

- Atomic Robo-Kid (1990)
- Street Smart (1991)
- Task Force Harrier EX (1991)
- Twin Cobra (1991)

== Bibliography ==
- "IGN: Treco". IGN. Archived from the original on March 8, 2002.
- "Treco, U.S.A." Allgame.
