= Fruity Frank =

1984 video game

- Publisher: Kuma Computers
- Programmer: Steve Wallis
- Artist: Sean Wallis
- Platforms: Amstrad CPC, MSX
- Release: EU: 1984
- Mode: Single-player

Fruity Frank is a 1984 video game for the Amstrad CPC and MSX home computers. Produced by Kuma Software and authored by Steve Wallis with graphics by his brother Sean Wallis, the gameplay is similar to Mr. Do!, though the story involves Frank protecting a garden from invading monsters.

== Gameplay ==
The player has to collect the fruits lying around the garden while avoiding touching the monsters. Apples can be pushed on these to kill them and offer temporary respite. Monsters can also be killed by throwing a bouncing apple pip at them. When all pieces of fruit have been collected the player proceeds to the next level. Each level is identifiable by a different colour background and a new jocular tune.

There are four types of enemies:

1. the yellow "big nose", slow: 20 points by shooting, 40 points by squashing
2. the violet "eggplant", fast, digging: 50 points by shooting, 100 points by squashing
3. the red "strawberry", very fast, digging: 100 points by shooting, 200 points by squashing
4. the green (spelling "Bonus")

Every 1000 points, Frank gains an extra life, with a maximum of two.
