= Vandyke (video game) =

1991 video game

- Developer: UPL
- Publisher: UPL
- Platform: Arcade
- Release: JP: February 1991
- Genre: Hack and slash
- Modes: Single-player, multiplayer

Vandyke (Note: Japanese: バンダイク, Hepburn: Bandaiku) is a 1991 hack and slash video game developed and published by UPL for arcades. It was released only in Japan in February 1991. Hamster Corporation acquired the rights to the game alongside UPL's intellectual property, releasing the game outside for the first time through their Arcade Archives series for the Nintendo Switch and PlayStation 4 in August 2021.

== Gameplay ==
Vandyke is a top-down hack and slash game where the player controls the titular barbarian warrior as he navigates levels and defeats enemies. While the gameplay format is similar to run and gun games like Ikari Warriors, it does not feature conventional long-range weapons, with the player using swords, boomerangs, bombs and flails instead. The player is armed with a sword by default, though either of the four weapons can be chosen from a power-up item. Another power-up item enhances the player's attack power.
