= Bio-ship Paladin =

1990 video game

- North American arcade flyer
- Developers: UPL; Aisystem Tokyo (Mega Drive)
- Publishers: JP: UPL; NA: Sammy Corporation
- Designer: Tsutomu Fuzisawa
- Composer: Yoshio Nagashima
- Platforms: Arcade, Sega Mega Drive
- Release: Arcade: JP: November 1990; NA: April 1991; Sega Mega Drive: JP: September 30, 1991
- Genre: Scrolling shooter
- Modes: Single-player, multiplayer

Bio-ship Paladin, known in Japan as Space Battleship Gomora (Note: Japanese: 宇宙戦艦ゴモラ, Hepburn: Uchū Senkan Gomora), is a 1990 horizontally scrolling shooter video game developed and published by UPL for arcades. It was released in Japan in November 1990 and in North America by Sammy Corporation in North America in April 1991. It was later ported to the Sega Mega Drive. Hamster Corporation released the game as part of their Arcade Archives series for the Nintendo Switch and PlayStation 4 in August 2021.

== Gameplay ==
A player engaging in battle in the Mega Drive version.

The player controls the bioship Paladin, traversing various levels while defeating enemies. Unlike most shoot 'em ups, the Paladin had an armor gauge which meant that the ship would not be destroyed with one hit or after brushing up against a foreground object. The ship had a semi-automatic Laser weapon that, when held down, would charge up and unleash a stronger laser blast. Players can use a manual aiming crosshair that could be placed anywhere on the screen for the Beam weapon, allowing the player to shoot any visible enemy fighter.

The player must fight their way through nine levels filled with clever foreground obstacles and waves of enemies. Many of the bosses had to be destroyed by first shooting off their guns, missile launchers and jets before destroying the whole ship. However, there were no Extend bonuses.

== Reception ==
In Japan, Game Machine listed Bio-ship Paladin on their December 15, 1990 issue as being the eleventh most-successful table arcade unit of the month.
