= Mr. Do! =

1982 video game

- North American arcade flyer
- Developer: Universal
- Publishers: WW: Universal; JP: Taito
- Designer: Kazutoshi Ueda
- Series: Mr. Do!
- Platform: Arcade: ColecoVision, Atari 2600, Tomy Tutor, MSX, Apple II, Atari 8-bit, Commodore 64, Game Boy, Super NES, X68000, PlayStation 4, PlayStation 5, Nintendo Switch
- Release: October 1982: Arcade; JP: October 1982; EU: Late 1982; NA: February 1983 ColecoVision; August 1983 2600; September 1983 Apple II, Atari 8-bit, C64; Early 1985 Game Boy; NA: November 1992; EU: 1992 Super NES; JP: June 23, 1995; NA: December 1996; PAL: March 27, 1997
- Genre: Maze
- Modes: Single-player, multiplayer

Mr. Do! (Note: Japanese: ミスタードゥ, Hepburn: Misutā Du) is a 1982 maze video game developed and published by Universal Entertainment for arcades. It is the first arcade video game to be released as a conversion kit for other cabinets; Taito published the conversion kit in Japan. The game was inspired by Namco's Dig Dug, released earlier in 1982. Mr. Do! was a commercial success in Japan and North America, selling 30,000 arcade units in the US, and it was followed by several arcade sequels.

== Gameplay ==
The object of Mr. Do! is to score as many points as possible by digging tunnels through the ground and collecting cherries. The title character, Mr. Do (a circus clown—except for the original Japanese version of the game, in which he is a snowman), is constantly chased by red dinosaur-like monsters called creeps, and the player loses a life if Mr. Do is caught by one. The game ends when the last life is lost.

Mr. Do collecting cherries while avoiding creeps

Cherries are distributed throughout the level in groups of eight, and collecting all the cherries in one group without a pause awards bonus points. A level is complete either when all cherries are removed, all creeps are destroyed, "EXTRA" is spelled, or a diamond is found.

Mr. Do can defeat creeps by hitting them with his bouncing "power ball" or by dropping large apples on them. While the power ball is bouncing toward a creep, Mr. Do is defenseless. If the ball bounces into an area where there are no creeps to hit (such as behind a fallen apple), Mr. Do cannot use it again until he has retrieved it. When the power ball hits a creep, it then reforms in Mr. Do's hands after a delay that increases with each use.

Mr. Do or the creeps can push an apple off the edge of a vertical tunnel and crush one or more creeps. If an apple falls more than its own height, it breaks and disappears. Mr. Do can also be crushed by a falling apple, causing a loss of life.

Occasionally, the creeps transform briefly into more powerful multicolored monsters that can tunnel through the ground. If one of these digs through a cherry, it leaves fewer cherries for Mr. Do to collect. When it digs under an apple, it often crushes itself, other creeps, and/or Mr. Do.

As the game progresses, a display at the top of the screen cycles through the letters in the word EXTRA. Every time the player's score reaches a multiple of 5,000 points, the highlighted letter enters the playfield as an Alphamonster, which can be defeated in the same manner as a creep. Defeating the Alphamonster awards its letter; collecting all five letters ends the level, plays a cut scene accompanied by the theme to Astro Boy, and awards the player an extra life. Alphamonsters attempt to eat any apples they encounter, which makes them difficult to crush.

The creeps spawn at the center of the screen. After they have all appeared, the generator will turn into a food item; picking this up scores bonus points, freezes all the creeps, and calls out an Alphamonster (if one is not already on the field) and three large blue monsters. The latter can eat apples as well. The creeps stay frozen until the player either defeats all three blue monsters, defeats the Alphamonster (in which case any remaining blue monsters are turned into apples), loses a life, or completes the stage.

A rarity for this title is that dropping an apple reveals a diamond which, if collected, completes the level and awards a bonus credit to the player.

== Development ==
Mr. Do! was created by Kazutoshi Ueda. It was inspired by the gameplay in Namco's Dig Dug game, similar to how many of Universal's other games took license from other companies' more successful games, e.g. Lady Bug (also designed by Ueda) being similar to Pac-Man. The idea for the power ball came from Mr. Ueda observing a Super Ball stuck on the roof of a home near the Universal office in Japan.

== Ports ==
Mr. Do! was ported to the Atari 2600, Atari 8-bit computers, ColecoVision, Apple II, MSX, Neo Geo, Tomy Tutor, and Commodore 64. A handheld LCD version was released by Tomy in 1983.

In the ColecoVision adaptation, the Alphamonster and sidekicks are unable to eat apples, making them easier to crush, but the blue monsters eat the shrubbery and cherries. Also, if an Alphamonster is over a letter that has already been acquired, the dinosaur monsters just freeze for a few seconds.

== Reception ==
In Japan, Mr. Do! was one of the top ten highest-grossing arcade games of 1982, on the annual Game Machine chart. Game Machine later listed Mr. Do! on their June 15, 1983 issue as being the 21st highest-earning table arcade cabinet of the month.

The arcade game was also a commercial success in North America, where it became the best-selling conversion kit up until 1984, selling approximately 30,000 arcade units in the United States. On the Play Meter arcade charts, it topped the street locations chart in May 1983. On the RePlay arcade charts, it topped the software conversion kit charts for five months in 1983, in June and then from August through November. It was among the thirteen highest-earning arcade games of 1983 in the United States, according to the Amusement & Music Operators Association (AMOA).

Computer and Video Games magazine gave the arcade original a positive review, stating that it "takes the best from" Dig Dug and said that improves on it. Computer and Video Games later rated the ColecoVision version 81% and Atari VCS version 77% in 1989. Computer Games magazine gave the ColecoVision and Coleco Adam conversions a B+ rating in 1985.

Famicom Tsūshin awarded the Super Famicom version of the game 25 out of 40. The four reviewers of Electronic Gaming Monthly gave it 4.875 out of 10. All but Dan Hsu felt that Mr. Do! has fun gameplay, but they criticized the lack of enhancements to what was by then over a decade old game, and recommended that players only get it if it were released at significantly less than the normal retail price for an SNES cartridge. Their later feature on 16-bit games reported that, contrary to their hopes, the game was priced at over $50. In 1995, Flux magazine ranked the arcade version 67th on their "Top 100 Video Games" list.

== Legacy ==
Mr. Do! was followed by three sequels: Mr. Do's Castle in 1983, Mr. Do's Wild Ride, and Do! Run Run both in 1984. An expanded 99-level version of Mr. Do! was released in arcades by Electrocoin in 1988.

Neo Mr. Do!, was developed by Visco and licensed by Universal for SNK's Neo Geo system in 1997. Mr. Do! was adapted to Nintendo's Game Boy and Super NES with some new gameplay features. A rebranded adaptation of the game was released for the Game Boy Color in 1999 as Quest: Fantasy Challenge (Holy Magic Century in Europe). It was developed by Imagineer.

The arcade version was released for the Wii Virtual Console by Hamster Corporation in Japan on April 27, 2010. The game was also released on the Taito Egret II's Arcade Memories Vol. 3 expansion pack on December 14, 2024, as one of 10 games available for the system via the SD card. It was made available on Antstream Arcade on November 6, 2025. Hamster Corporation released the game as part of their Arcade Archives series for the Nintendo Switch and PlayStation 4, as well as their Arcade Archives 2 series for the Nintendo Switch 2, PlayStation 5 and Xbox Series X/S in March 2026.

=== Impact ===
Mr. Do! is credited as the first arcade game to be released as a conversion kit. Multiple clones of Mr. Do! were released for home systems, including Magic Meanies (ZX Spectrum), Henri (Atari 8-bit), Fruity Frank (Amstrad CPC, MSX), Mr. Dig (TRS-80 Color Computer, Atari 8-bit), and Mr. Ee! (BBC Micro).

The game's creator Kazutoshi Ueda went on to work at Tehkan (now Tecmo) and then became a co-founder of Atlus, where he worked on the Megami Tensei series. Ueda's work at Universal, particularly Mr. Do!, inspired the game design style of Tehkan's Michitaka Tsuruta, who went on to create Guzzler (1983), Bomb Jack (1984), Solomon's Key (1986), and the Captain Tsubasa game series.
