= Ninja-Kid =

1984 video game

Ninja-kun: Adventure of Devil Castle
- Arcade flyer
- Developers: UPL (Arcade); Tose (FC); Jaleco (MSX)
- Publishers: JP: Taito (Arcade); JP: Jaleco (FC); JP: Nippon Dexter (MSX); EU: Eaglesoft (MSX)
- Platforms: Arcade, Family Computer, MSX
- Release: Arcade: JP: October 1984; Family Computer: JP: May 10, 1985; MSX: JP: 1985; EU: 1986
- Genre: Platform
- Modes: Single-player, multiplayer

Ninja-kun: Adventure of Devil Castle (Note: Japanese: 忍者くん魔城の冒険, Hepburn: Ninja-kun Majō no Bōken) is a 1984 platform video game developed by UPL and published by Taito for arcades. It was later ported to the Famicom and MSX in 1984. Initially released only in Japan, a MSX version developed by Jaleco was released in Europe under the name Ninja.

== Gameplay ==
Ninja-kun's Demon Castle Adventure features three upward scrolling levels that repeat and become more difficult. The objective is to defeat the enemies on each screen and advance to the next screen. The player can attack with shurikens and jump on enemies' heads to stun them. Occasionally, an orb will appear and if the player collects three, a bonus level will be unlocked.

== Reception ==
In Japan, Game Machine listed Ninja-Kid on their November 15, 1984 issue as being the second most-successful table arcade unit of the month.

== Legacy ==
After Jaleco had ported the game and its sequel to the Famicom and MSX in Japan, the company created a spinoff game, Ninja JaJaMaru-kun and created a series of the same name. The Ninja JaJaMaru-kun series would feature several games released on various consoles and handhelds, many of the games are different genres like role-playing video game gameplay.

Hamster Corporation acquired the game's rights alongside UPL's intellectual property; they released the game as part of their Arcade Archives series for the PlayStation 4 in May 2014 and Nintendo Switch in April 2018 by the name of Ninja-Kid.

Capcom alumnus and PlatinumGames co-founder Hideki Kamiya is a fan of the game, briefly holding the world record of the game on the Arcade Archives series in 2019.
