= Omega Fighter =

1989 video game

- Developer(s): UPL
- Publisher(s): JP: UPL; NA: American Sammy
- Platform(s): Arcade
- Release: JP: July 1989; NA: August 1989; EU: October 1989
- Genre(s): Shoot 'em up
- Mode(s): Single-player, multiplayer

Omega Fighter (Note: Japanese: オメガファイター, Hepburn: Omega Faitā) is a 1989 vertically scrolling shooter video game developed and published by UPL for arcades. It was released by American Sammy in North America. While similar to most other scrolling shooters, Omega Fighter was unique in its gameplay, level and enemy focus: rather than flying over multiple levels, the player faced up against an enormous space battle cruiser which contained every level. A Sega Genesis version was planned but never released.

== Gameplay ==
Set in the future, an enormous alien battle cruiser—essentially a spacecraft carrier—has launched an attack on Earth. Humanity’s only defense lies in small, heavily armed fighter crafts tasked with dismantling the cruiser piece by piece before it reaches the planet’s surface.

Players were briefed before every mission to destroy specific parts of the enormous ship.Destroying parts of the ship not only influenced the game’s ending but also contributed to the player's overall score. The game featured a unique scoring system that rewarded players for eliminating enemies at point-blank range.

There are two weapons that the player picks up, and if the player picks up a different powerup, it will always reset to its lowest level:

- (I) - Ion Laser: Shoots straight, pick up more to increase damage at a cost of decreasing length. Ideal for close combat.
- (W) - Wide Shot: Shoots bullets in wider range when collecting more of them. Ideal for taking enemies from afar but deals less damage.

There are also two items that are pressed by the 'bomb' button, and each player may pick up to two of them:

- Silver: Activate to slow down everything on screen. Useful to dodge bullets and getting closer for higher score.
- Gold: Destroy all enemies on screen, score depends on closeness to player prior to using the item.

== Reception ==
In Japan, Game Machine listed Omega Fighter on their August 15, 1989 issue as being the fifteenth most popular table arcade unit at the time.

At the time of the game's release, Computer + Video Games and Advanced Computer Entertainment generally found the game playable and fulfilling. Your Sinclair, on the other hand, felt the gameplay and graphics were uninspired.

== See also ==
- Task Force Harrier
