= ECSE (Academic Degree) =

Academic Degree in computer science

ECSE is an abbreviation for Electrical Engineering and Computer Sciences and Systems Engineering. It is a designation used at some universities for the major or department that blends these three fields together.

One reason behind linking the areas of study is to provide students with a broad overview of each of software, hardware and Systems theory. However there are also reasons for not blending departments: Students who major in theoretical computer science, studying such topics as algorithm analysis and software engineering, may not have any use for extensive electrical engineering or systems theory classes.

Not every university uses the ECSE designation. Several universities, for example, have separate EE/ECE and CS departments/majors. Other schools use the similar ECE (Electrical and Computer Engineering) designation. Additionally, some schools which offer an ECSE degree also offer degrees in Electrical Engineering or Computer Science separately.

== Academic Citation ==
"ECSE".

== See also ==
- Academic major
