= Epson QX-11 =

Microcomputer

- Also known as: Abacus, Epson QC-11
- Manufacturer: Epson
- Released: 1985; 41 years ago
- Operating system: MS-DOS 2.11
- CPU: 8088-2 @ 4.92 MHz
- Memory: 128 KB to 512 KB
- Removable storage: two 5.25" disk-drives
- Display: 80×25, 40×25 text; 640×400 monochrome graphics, 640×200 eight-color
- Sound: PSG audio
- Connectivity: Parallel, RS-232C

The Epson QX-11, sold in some markets as the Abacus, was an IBM PC compatible personal computer released by Epson in 1985. In Japan, the model was marketed as the QC-11.

A contemporary article in ASCII magazine described the QC-11 as a compact machine designed for Japanese office environments, with the operating system stored in ROM. The article emphasized that the machine could start MS-DOS without inserting a diskette, because the operating system was held in ROM.

The Japanese QC-11 specification listed in ASCII used an 8088-2 CPU clocked at 4.92 MHz, Japanese MS-DOS Ver. 2.11 in ROM, 256 KB of user RAM expandable to 512 KB, and 48 KB of video RAM. Its display modes included 80×25 and 40×25 text, Japanese text display, 640×400 monochrome graphics, and 640×200 eight-color graphics when used with a digital RGB monitor. The export QX-11 configuration is listed with 128 KB to 512 KB of RAM and 64 KB of ROM.

Japanese-language support on the QC-11 included JIS first-level kanji, optional JIS second-level kanji, user-defined characters, and kana-kanji conversion input at the operating-system level. Expansion and I/O features listed for the QC-11 included CRT and digital RGB monitor interfaces, keyboard interface, 8-bit parallel printer interface, RS-232C serial interface, ROM cartridge interface, joystick interface, PSG audio output, and four internal ROM slots, one of which was used by a Japanese dictionary ROM card.
