= Mr. Do's Wild Ride =

1984 video game

- Developer: Universal
- Publisher: Universal
- Series: Mr. Do
- Platforms: Arcade, MSX
- Release: January 1984: Arcade; 1985: MSX
- Genre: Platform
- Modes: Single-player, multiplayer

Mr. Do's Wild Ride (Japanese: ミスター・ドゥ・ズ・ワイルドライド) is a platform arcade game released by Universal in 1984. It is the third in the Mr. Do! arcade video game series. An MSX version was published in 1985.

== Gameplay ==
Mr. Do must reach the top of the level, and climb ladders to avoid roller coaster cars and other hazards.

Mr. Do!'s scenario is a roller coaster, and the object is to reach the top. As the cars (and eventually other objects) speed around the track, the player must escape by using a super speed button, or by climbing up small ladders scattered about the track to dodge the hazards. Two icons at the end of the level range from cakes to EXTRA letters or diamonds change upon collecting cherries at the top of each letter. The game is timed, and the timer ticks faster when the super speed button is held down. Collision with a roller coaster car or another object is fatal, knocking Mr. Do! off the coaster and costing a life.

After the sixth level is completed, the game cycles back to the first with various obstacles and/or more roller coaster cars to avoid.

== Reception ==
In Japan, Game Machine listed Mr. Do's Wild Ride on their April 15, 1984 issue as being the sixth most-successful table arcade unit of the month.

== Legacy ==
Ocean Software published a clone for the Commodore 64, Amstrad CPC, and ZX Spectrum as Kong Strikes Back! It incorporates cosmetic aspects of Donkey Kong.
