= Do! Run Run =

1984 video game

- Developer: Universal Entertainment
- Publisher: Universal Entertainment
- Series: Mr. Do
- Platforms: Arcade, Amiga, Atari ST, MSX
- Release: 1984
- Genres: Maze
- Modes: Single-player, multiplayer

Do! Run Run, also known as Super Pierrot (スーパーピエロ Sūpā Piero), is a 1984 maze arcade video game developed and published by Universal Entertainment. It is the fourth and final incarnation of Mr. Do!, the company's video game mascot. Returning to his Mr. Do! roots, the clown has a bouncing powerball with which to hurl at monsters. Mr. Do runs along the playfield picking up dots and leaving a line behind him, which the player is encouraged to create closed off sections with. Precariously balanced log traps can be rolled downslope, crushing enemies. The resulting game is something of a cross between Mr. Do!, Congo Bongo, Pac-Man, and Qix.

== Gameplay ==
Gameplay

The goal of Do! Run Run is to rack up points while completing screens. A screen is completed whenever all the fruits/dots are eaten, or when all of the regular monsters (not Alpha-monsters or their sidekicks) are defeated. Using the rope that follows Mr. Do to inscribe dots will convert them into cherries, a familiar fruit for Mr. Do to collect. Cherries are worth more points than dots, and eating them restores the powerball more quickly than eating dots would. Each time Mr. Do inscribes fruit, they progress to a higher tier, dots become cherries, cherries become apples, apples become lemons and lemons become pineapples. Eating a dot awards 10 points and 1/16 of a powerball recharge; eating a pineapple is worth 160 points and 1/4 of a powerball recharge.

Players are additionally encouraged to inscribe sections of the playfield by the letters E, X, T, R, A, a constant feature of the Mr. Do! games. Randomly, one of the inscribed fruits will turn into a flashing letter spot, corresponding with the movement of the Alpha-Monster at the top of the screen. If Mr. Do! runs over this spot, the monster sporting that letter will release from the top of the screen with three blue henchmen (which resemble the three ghost-like monsters from the original Mr. Do!), and chase after Mr. Do. Defeating the Alpha-monster will lock in that letter, and once all 5 letters are earned, the player earns an extra life (as well as progressing to the next stage, you also earn a 5,000 point bonus).

Points are also awarded for defeating monsters. Directly firing the powerball at a monster awards 500 points and consumes the powerball, which needs to be replenished by eating fruit. More points are earned if the powerball bounces off of a surface; each bounce raises the bonus by 500 points until a maximum of 3000 points are earned. Smashing monsters with a rolling log earns 1000 points; it is possible to roll over multiple monsters and earn a cumulative bonus of 500 per extra monster (so, 1500 for the 2nd, 2000 for the 3rd, etc.).

=== Monsters ===
Like other Mr. Do! games, the monsters are nameless (except Alpha-monsters) and defy easy description. Two types of monsters attempt to foil the clown's efforts, a green clam-like monster, and a blue snake-like monster. Neither are particularly sophisticated, although the clam monsters have some seemingly clever moments where they bumble into the player's path or out of the way of the powerball. The blue snakes will, if the players linger too long on a direct path from them, convert into a fireball and charge across the playing field. In this state, they are immune to the powerball. As is common with arcade games, contact with monsters is instantly fatal, with Mr. Do shown to be electrocuted, complete with visible flashing skeleton, and then reappearing as a black skeleton.

After some time on each stage elapses, the music changes and any surviving monsters convert into a different form; the clam monsters become blue and armored with spines, the snake monsters essentially become different looking snake monsters. The speed of each monster, and the willingness to chase Mr. Do, are about the only other major changes; they can be fairly easily eluded so long as the player does not simply run away from them. Instead, Mr. Do should climb up or down the terrain if too closely chased; monsters lose a lot of time changing levels on the playfield whereas Mr. Do gets a slight speed up for going downslope. After a short duration, the music resumes, and the monsters transform back into their old selves, with the pattern of transformation repeating.

Alpha-monsters, when they are summoned by the letter circle, are released with three henchmen. The henchmen home in on Mr. Do! and typically precede the alpha-monster. Killing the Alpha-monster rids the playfield of the henchmen, although it is easier to lure all four into the path of a log and smash them. Alpha-monsters are also released every time the score reaches increments of 5,000 points unless there is already an alpha-monster on the playfield.

=== Free games ===
While this can be configured by the ROM to not occur, infrequently, a bonus diamond worth 10,000 points will show up in the same manner as the letter circles when fruit are inscribed. If the player collects this, the stage ends and they are awarded a bonus credit in the fashion of the original Mr. Do!.
