= Atomic Robo-Kid =

1988 video game

- North American arcade flyer
- Developer: UPL
- Publishers: JP: UPL; NA: Nikom
- Designer: Tsutomu Fujisawa
- Platforms: Arcade, PC Engine, Sega Genesis, Commodore 64, Atari ST, Amiga, X68000
- Release: JP: November 1988; NA: February 1989
- Genre: Scrolling shooter
- Modes: Single-player, multiplayer

Atomic Robo-Kid (Note: Japanese: アトミック・ロボキッド, Hepburn: Atomikku Robokiddo) is a 1988 horizontally scrolling shooter video game developed and published by UPL for arcades. The game was published in North America in February 1989 by Nikom as its only released arcade title. The PC Engine version is an adaptation of the arcade original and published as Atomic Robo-Kid Special.

== Gameplay ==
Screenshot

The player controls the titular character through six stages of increasing difficulty, facing an alien "governor" boss (which is so large as to be considered a level in and of themself, as some of the bosses take up several screens) at the end of each level, followed by a "duel" level against other Robo-Kid sized robots. Many levels branch into others, giving the player the choice over which zone to enter next, increasing replayability.

Robo-Kid can collect four different weapons (whichever weapon is selected is lost when Robo-kid loses a life) in addition to his default gun, collect powerups for a shield that activates on enemy contact, plus rapid fire and speed powerups. The player can also encounter a friendly dinosaur-looking robot that sells weapons and shields to Robo-kid using extra lives as currency.

== Ports ==
The game was ported to the PC Engine, Sega Genesis, Commodore 64, Atari ST, Amiga, and X68000.

A demo was distributed of the ZX Spectrum version before it was cancelled.

== Reception ==
Reception

Review score
Publication	Score
Electronic Gaming Monthly	6/10, 7/10, 7/10, 6/10 (Genesis)

In Japan, Game Machine listed Atomic Robo-Kid on their March 1, 1989 issue as being the eighth-most-successful table arcade unit of the month.

== Legacy ==
The game was released by Hamster Corporation (its current rights owner) as part of their Arcade Archives series on the PlayStation 4 in 2016 and Nintendo Switch in 2018.
