= Ninja Taro =

1991 video game

- Japanese cover art
- Developer: NMK
- Publishers: UPL; American Sammy
- Composer: Kazunori Hideya
- Platform: Game Boy
- Release: JP: March 8, 1991; NA: September 1992
- Genre: Action-adventure
- Mode: Single-player

Ninja Taro, released in Japan as Sengoku Ninja-kun (戦国忍者くん), is an action-adventure video game for the Game Boy by NMK. It was released in 1991 in both Japan by UPL and North America by American Sammy and is part of the Ninja-kun series.

== Story ==
When rumors start to emerge that the feudal lord Takeda Shingen was pronounced dead, the country's biggest enemy Oda Nobunaga became ambitious. He started talking about unifying all of Japan under his leadership.

== Summary ==
The player fighting the final boss.

Players need to explore the world map, do quests for the people who live in the towns, find treasure chests in order to become stronger instead of earning experience points and hunt inside caves to destroy major enemies. There is no puzzle solving or currency used in the game, making it more straightforward than the games in The Legend of Zelda series. Most weapons are obtained by killing enemies.

The bosses in this game can be described as "visually grotesque". Takeda Shingen is the mastermind behind all the turmoil that takes place in this game. Players can use rice balls and herb in order to replenish their strength levels. In the main menu, players have three stats: body (representing hit points), force (representing the weapon's attack power), and charm. The ending of the game shows the player relaxing with his girlfriend.

One of the drawbacks in this video game is that the player has a rather slow walking speed. Players can either use samurai swords or shurikens for combat purposes; shurikens have a shorter range and are weaker than swords. However, both swords and shurikens can be powered up by the treasure chests located throughout the game.

== Release and reception ==
Reception

Review score
Publication	Score
Famitsu	6/10, 6/10, 7/10, 4/10

Ninja Taro was released in Japan on March 8, 1991.
