= List of Nintendo Switch games (An–Az) =

This is part of the list of Nintendo Switch games.

== List ==
There are currently 4133 games across List of Nintendo Switch games (0–9), List of Nintendo Switch games (A–Am), this page (An–Az), List of Nintendo Switch games (B), List of Nintendo Switch games (C–G), List of Nintendo Switch games (H–P), and List of Nintendo Switch games (Q–Z).

List of Nintendo Switch games
Title	Developer(s)	Publisher(s)	Release date	Ref.
Anarcute	Anarteam	JP: Digital Bards; WW: Plug In Digital	May 30, 2019	
Ancestors Legacy	Destructive Creations	JP: Destructive Creations; WW: 1C Company	June 11, 2020	
Ancient Rush 2	Heideland GameWork	Heideland GameWork	January 18, 2019	
Ancient Stories: Gods of Egypt	Alawar, Panda Games Studio	ChiliDog Interactive	October 15, 2021	
Angelian Trigger	Pixel	Pixel	December 12, 2024	
Angels of Death	Hoshikuzu KRNKRN	Playism	June 28, 2018	
Angel's Punishment	B & GN Team	Game Nacional	September 3, 2021	
Angels with Scaly Wings	Radical Phi	Ratalaika Games	April 30, 2021	
AngerForce: Reloaded	Screambox Studio	indienova	April 2, 2019	
Angelique Luminarise	Ruby Party	Koei Tecmo	May 20, 2021	
Angry Bunnies: Colossal Carrot Crusade	YFC Games	YFC Games	September 19, 2019	
Angry Golf	Tero Lunkka	Ultimate Games	March 23, 2021	
The Angry Video Game Nerd I & II Deluxe	FreakZone Games	Screenwave Media	October 30, 2020	
Anima: Gate of Memories	Anima Project	BLG Publishing	June 29, 2018	
Anima: Gate of Memories - The Nameless Chronicles	Anima Project	Badland Games	June 29, 2018	
Animal Bomber	Piotr Skalski	Piotr Skalski	March 6, 2021	
Animal Crossing: New Horizons	Nintendo EPD	Nintendo	March 20, 2020	
Animal Doctor	Caipirinha Games	Toplitz Productions	March 25, 2021	
Animal Fight Club	Marco Amadei	Corvostudio di Amadei Marco	July 25, 2019	
Animal Fun for Toddlers & Kids	winterworks	winterworks	April 23, 2020	
Animal Pairs: Matching & Concentration Game For Toddlers & Kids	winterworks	winterworks	June 4, 2020	
Animal Pals Bubble Pop	Digital Game Group	Digital Game Group	November 20, 2020	
Animal Puzzle: Preschool Learning Game for Kids and Toddlers	McPeppergames	McPeppergames	September 2, 2021	
Animal Rivals	Blue Sunset Games	Blue Sunset Games	July 18, 2018	
Animal Rivals: Up in the Air	Beast Games	Console Labs	July 22, 2022	
Animal Super Squad	DoubleMoose	DoubleMoose	May 1, 2018	
Animal Up!	Hook Games, FobTi Interactive	Nestor Yavorskyy	May 22, 2020	
Animal Well	Billy Basso	Bigmode	May 9, 2024	
Animals for Toddlers	winterworks	winterworks	September 24, 2020	
AnimaLudo	Marionette Games	Prison Games	June 25, 2021	
Animated Jigsaws: Beautiful Japanese Scenery	Dico	Rainy Frog	April 5, 2018	
Animated Jigsaws: Japanese Women	Dico	Rainy Frog	October 4, 2018	
Animated Jigsaws: Wild Animals	Dico	Rainy Frog	December 20, 2018	
Anime Studio Story	Kairosoft	Kairosoft	January 16, 2020	
Animus	Troooze	Troooze	January 3, 2019	
Animus: Harbinger	Tenbirds	Troooze	November 7, 2019	
Animus: Revenant	Tenbirds	Troooze	June 10, 2021	
Animus: Stand Alone	Tenbirds	Bandai Namco Entertainment	December 6, 2018	
Ankh Guardian: Treasure of the Demon's Temple	Tom Create	Tom Create	July 4, 2019	
Anna's Quest	Daedalic Entertainment	Daedalic Entertainment	June 30, 2021	
Ano, Subarashii o Mouichido/Saisouban HD	AnuraBless	Mebius	March 29, 2023	
Anode	Kittehface Software	Kittehface Software	August 17, 2019	
Anodyne	Analgesic Productions	Nnooo	February 28, 2019	
Anodyne 2: Return to Dust	Analgesic Productions	Ratalaika Games	February 18, 2021	
Anomaly Collapse	RocketPunch Games	RocketPunch Games	July 17, 2025	
Anonymous;Code	Mages, Chiyomaru Studio	Mages	July 28, 2022	
Another Code: Recollection	Arc System Works	Nintendo	January 19, 2024	
Another Eden Begins	Studio Prisma	Wright Flyer Studios	Q3 2026	
Another Lost Phone: Laura's Story	Accidental Queens, Seaven Studio	Plug In Digital	April 26, 2018	
Another Sight	Lunar Great Wall Studios	Lunar Great Wall Studios	June 28, 2019	
Another World	Dotemu	Dotemu	July 9, 2018	
Anpanman Touch de Enjoy! AIUEO Kyoushitsu	PINOCCHIO	Agatsuma Entertainment	July 25, 2024	
AnShi	Heideland GameWorks	Heideland GameWorks	February 22, 2021	
Ant-Gravity: Tiny's Adventure	QUByte Interactive	QUByte Interactive	May 28, 2020	
Anthill	Thunderful Publishing	Thunderful Publishing	October 24, 2019	
Antiquia Lost	Exe Create	Kemco	November 16, 2017	
Antonball Deluxe	Summitsphere	Summitsphere, Proponent Games (formerly)	September 28, 2021	
Antonblast	Summitsphere	Summitsphere	December 13, 2024	
AntVentor	Loopymood	Loopymood	June 24, 2020	
AO Tennis 2	Big Ant Studios	JP: Oizumi Amuzio; WW: Bigben Interactive	January 9, 2020	
Aoi Shiro HD Remaster	Success Corporation	Success Corporation	May 25, 2023	
Aokana: Four Rhythm Across the Blue	Sprite	JP: Sprite; WW: PQube	March 29, 2018	
Aokana: Four Rhythm Across the Blue EXTRA1S	Sprite	Sprite	May 25, 2023	
Aokana: Four Rhythm Across the Blue EXTRA2S	Sprite	Sprite	May 25, 2023	
Aonatsu Line	Entergram	Entergram	February 24, 2022	
Apathy: Narugami Gakuen Nana Fushigi	Mebius	Mebius	August 4, 2022	
Ape Out	Gabe Cuzzillo	Devolver Digital	February 28, 2019	
Aperion Cyberstorm	aPriori Digital	aPriori Digital	February 8, 2018	
Apex Legends	Respawn Entertainment	Electronic Arts	March 9, 2021	
Apocryph: An Old-School Shooter	Bigzur Games	Bigzur Games	March 14, 2019	
Apollo Justice: Ace Attorney Trilogy	Capcom	Capcom	January 25, 2024	
Apparition	MrCiastku	No Gravity Games	November 13, 2020	
Apple Knight	Limitless	Limitless	September 9, 2021	
Apple Knight 2	Limitless	Limitless	March 13, 2025	
Apple Slash	Agelvik	Ratalaika Games	July 30, 2021	
Apsulov: End of Gods	Angry Demon Studios	Digerati Distribution	September 2, 2021	
Aqua Kitty UDX	Tikipod	Tikipod	February 15, 2018	
Aqua Lungers	WarpedCore Studio	WarpedCore Studio	May 21, 2020	
Aqua Moto Racing Utopia	Zordix	Bigben Interactive	November 24, 2017	
Aquarium	Entergram	Entergram	October 27, 2022	
The Aquarium Does Not Dance	Daidai	Frontier Works	August 1, 2025	
The Aquatic Adventure of the Last Human	YCJY	Digerati	December 25, 2018	
Aquatic Rampage	Game Nacional	Game Nacional	June 19, 2021	
Ar Nosurge DX	Gust	Koei Tecmo	March 4, 2021	
Ara Fell: Enhanced Edition	Stegosoft Games	Dangen Entertainment	March 26, 2020	
Aragami: Shadow Edition	Lince Works	Merge Games	February 21, 2019	
Aragami 2	Lince Works	Merge Games	November 10, 2022	
Arc of Alchemist	Compile Heart	Idea Factory	October 10, 2019	
Arcade Archives: 10-Yard Fight	Irem	Hamster Corporation	May 2, 2018	
Arcade Archives: 64th Street: A Detective Story	Jaleco	Hamster Corporation	October 29, 2020	
Arcade Archives: A-Jax	Konami	Hamster Corporation	April 22, 2021	
Arcade Archives: Aero Fighters	Video System	Hamster Corporation	December 14, 2023	
Arcade Archives: Alpha Mission	SNK	Hamster Corporation	October 25, 2018	
Arcade Archives: Alpine Ski	Taito	Hamster Corporation	May 30, 2019	
Arcade Archives: Arabian	Sunsoft	Hamster Corporation	October 8, 2020	
Arcade Archives: Argus	Jaleco	Hamster Corporation	August 30, 2018	
Arcade Archives: Ark Area	UPL	Hamster Corporation	May 18, 2023	
Arcade Archives: Armed F	Nichibutsu	Hamster Corporation	March 28, 2019	
Arcade Archives: Assault	Namco	Hamster Corporation	September 29, 2022	
Arcade Archives: Assault Plus	Namco	Hamster Corporation	April 3, 2025	
Arcade Archives: The Astyanax	Jaleco	Hamster Corporation	May 6, 2021	
Arcade Archives: Athena	SNK	Hamster Corporation	December 13, 2018	
Arcade Archives: Atomic Robo-Kid	UPL	Hamster Corporation	November 15, 2018	
Arcade Archives: Baraduke	Namco	Hamster Corporation	November 10, 2022	
Arcade Archives: Baraduke 2	Namco	Hamster Corporation	August 3, 2023	
Arcade Archives: Bells & Whistles	Konami	Hamster Corporation	January 16, 2020	
Arcade Archives: Ben Bero Beh	Taito	Hamster Corporation	October 1, 2020	
Arcade Archives: Bio-ship Paladin	UPL	Hamster Corporation	August 5, 2021	
Arcade Archives: Black Heart	UPL	Hamster Corporation	November 4, 2021	
Arcade Archives: Blandia	Allumer	Hamster Corporation	October 19, 2023	
Arcade Archives: Blast Off	Namco	Hamster Corporation	September 26, 2024	
Arcade Archives: Block Hole	Konami	Hamster Corporation	January 21, 2022	
Arcade Archives: Bomb Jack	Tecmo	Hamster Corporation	January 24, 2019	
Arcade Archives: Bonze Adventure	Taito	Hamster Corporation	March 23, 2023	
Arcade Archives: Bosconian	Namco	Hamster Corporation	August 24, 2023	
Arcade Archives: Bravoman	Namco	Hamster Corporation	June 8, 2023	
Arcade Archives: Bubble Bobble	Taito	Hamster Corporation	December 29, 2022	
Arcade Archives: BurgerTime	Data East	Hamster Corporation	July 30, 2020	
Arcade Archives: Burnin' Rubber	Data East	Hamster Corporation	September 24, 2020	
Arcade Archives: Burning Force	Namco	Hamster Corporation	October 26, 2023	
Arcade Archives: Butasan	Jaleco	Hamster Corporation	May 16, 2019	
Arcade Archives: Cadash	Taito	Hamster Corporation	August 31, 2023	
Arcade Archives: Castle of Dragon	Athena	Hamster Corporation	January 2, 2025	
Arcade Archives: Chack'n Pop	Taito	Hamster Corporation	July 21, 2022	
Arcade Archives: Champion Wrestler	Taito	Hamster Corporation	September 8, 2022	
Arcade Archives: Circus Charlie	Konami	Hamster Corporation	August 6, 2020	
Arcade Archives: City Bomber	Konami	Hamster Corporation	December 5, 2024	
Arcade Archives: City Connection	Jaleco	Hamster Corporation	July 19, 2018	
Arcade Archives: Clu Clu Land	Nintendo	Hamster Corporation	June 28, 2019	
Arcade Archives: Contra	Konami	Hamster Corporation	September 3, 2020	
Arcade Archives: Cop 01	Nichibutsu	Hamster Corporation	June 29, 2023	
Arcade Archives: Cosmo Gang the Puzzle	Namco	Hamster Corporation	January 11, 2024	
Arcade Archives: Cosmo Gang the Video	Namco	Hamster Corporation	April 20, 2023	
Arcade Archives: Cosmo Police Galivan	Nichibutsu	Hamster Corporation	January 14, 2021	
Arcade Archives: Cotton: Fantastic Night Dreams	Success	Hamster Corporation	November 28, 2024	
Arcade Archives: Crazy Balloon	Taito	Hamster Corporation	June 26, 2025	
Arcade Archives: Crazy Climber	Nichibutsu	Hamster Corporation	February 8, 2018	
Arcade Archives: Crazy Climber 2	Nichibutsu	Hamster Corporation	May 28, 2020	
Arcade Archives: Crime City	Taito	Hamster Corporation	September 19, 2024	
Arcade Archives: Crime Fighters	Konami	Hamster Corporation	March 18, 2021	
Arcade Archives: Crime Fighters 2 (Vendetta)	Konami	Hamster Corporation	July 21, 2021	
Arcade Archives: Cue Brick	Konami	Hamster Corporation	May 30, 2024	
Arcade Archives: Cybattler	Jaleco	Hamster Corporation	February 18, 2021	
Arcade Archives: Daioh	Athena	Hamster Corporation	November 2, 2023	
Arcade Archives: Dangerous Seed	Namco	Hamster Corporation	February 17, 2022	
Arcade Archives: Darius	Taito	Hamster Corporation	October 6, 2022	
Arcade Archives: Darius II	Taito	Hamster Corporation	October 5, 2023	
Arcade Archives: Dark Adventure	Konami	Hamster Corporation	August 17, 2023	
Arcade Archives: Darwin 4078	Data East	Hamster Corporation	July 15, 2021	
Arcade Archives: Dead Angle	Seibu Kaihatsu	Hamster Corporation	September 5, 2024	
Arcade Archives: Dead Connection	Taito	Hamster Corporation	February 27, 2025	
Arcade Archives: Dig Dug	Namco	Hamster Corporation	August 4, 2022	
Arcade Archives: Dig Dug II	Namco	Hamster Corporation	April 13, 2023	
Arcade Archives: Dino Rex	Taito	Hamster Corporation	November 16, 2023	
Arcade Archives: Don Doko Don	Taito	Hamster Corporation	February 24, 2023	
Arcade Archives: Donkey Kong	Nintendo	Hamster Corporation	June 15, 2018	
Arcade Archives: Donkey Kong Jr.	Nintendo	Hamster Corporation	December 21, 2018	
Arcade Archives: Donkey Kong 3	Nintendo	Hamster Corporation	April 5, 2019	
Arcade Archives: Double Dragon	Technōs Japan	Hamster Corporation	January 18, 2018	
Arcade Archives: Double Dragon II: The Revenge	Technōs Japan	Hamster Corporation	December 6, 2018	
Arcade Archives: Dragon Buster	Namco	Hamster Corporation	December 9, 2021	
Arcade Archives: Dragon Saber	Namco	Hamster Corporation	July 14, 2022	
Arcade Archives: Dragon Spirit	Namco	Hamster Corporation	March 3, 2022	
Arcade Archives: Earth Defense Force	Jaleco	Hamster Corporation	September 17, 2020	
Arcade Archives: Elevator Action	Taito	Hamster Corporation	March 14, 2019	
Arcade Archives: Emeraldia	Namco	Hamster Corporation	April 18, 2024	
Arcade Archives: Empire City: 1931	Seibu Kaihatsu	Hamster Corporation	March 24, 2022	
Arcade Archives: Escape Kids	Konami	Hamster Corporation	January 16, 2025	
Arcade Archives: Excitebike	Nintendo	Hamster Corporation	September 21, 2018	
Arcade Archives: Exerion	Jaleco	Hamster Corporation	January 9, 2020	
Arcade Archives: Exvania	Namco	Hamster Corporation	April 4, 2024	
Arcade Archives: F/A	Namco	Hamster Corporation	May 15, 2024	
Arcade Archives: Face Off	Namco	Hamster Corporation	February 8, 2024	
Arcade Archives: The Fairyland Story	Taito	Hamster Corporation	December 3, 2020	
Arcade Archives: Fighting Hawk	Taito	Hamster Corporation	May 6, 2022	
Arcade Archives: Final Blow	Taito	Hamster Corporation	November 21, 2024	
Arcade Archives: The Final Round	Konami	Hamster Corporation	August 1, 2024	
Arcade Archives: Final Star Force	Tecmo	Hamster Corporation	January 23, 2025	
Arcade Archives: Finalizer: Super Transformation	Konami	Hamster Corporation	August 29, 2024	
Arcade Archives: Finest Hour	Namco	Hamster Corporation	September 28, 2023	
Arcade Archives: Flipull	Taito	Hamster Corporation	May 26, 2022	
Arcade Archives: Football Champ	Taito	Hamster Corporation	July 18, 2024	
Arcade Archives: Formation Z	Jaleco	Hamster Corporation	March 19, 2020	
Arcade Archives: Frisky Tom	Nichibutsu	Hamster Corporation	April 15, 2021	
Arcade Archives: Frogger	Konami	Hamster Corporation	December 12, 2019	
Arcade Archives: Front Line	Taito	Hamster Corporation	February 14, 2019	
Arcade Archives: Galaga	Namco	Hamster Corporation	January 5, 2023	
Arcade Archives: Galaga '88	Namco	Hamster Corporation	April 27, 2023	
Arcade Archives: Galaxian	Namco	Hamster Corporation	November 24, 2022	
Arcade Archives: Gang Busters	Konami	Hamster Corporation	April 10, 2025	
Arcade Archives: Gaplus	Namco	Hamster Corporation	April 21, 2022	
Arcade Archives: Gemini Wing	Tecmo	Hamster Corporation	September 10, 2022	
Arcade Archives: The Genji and the Heike Clans	Namco	Hamster Corporation	October 7, 2021	
Arcade Archives: Golf	Nintendo	Hamster Corporation	October 25, 2019	
Arcade Archives: Gradius	Konami	Hamster Corporation	July 9, 2020	
Arcade Archives: Gradius II	Konami	Hamster Corporation	November 12, 2022	
Arcade Archives: Grobda	Namco	Hamster Corporation	February 16, 2023	
Arcade Archives: Growl	Taito	Hamster Corporation	July 27, 2023	
Arcade Archives: Guerrilla War	SNK	Hamster Corporation	February 25, 2021	
Arcade Archives: Gun Frontier	Taito	Hamster Corporation	August 12, 2022	
Arcade Archives: Gunnail	NMK	Hamster Corporation	January 13, 2022	
Arcade Archives: Guttang Gottong	Konami	Hamster Corporation	October 12, 2023	
Arcade Archives: Guzzler	Tecmo	Hamster Corporation	May 13, 2021	
Arcade Archives: Hacha Mecha Fighter	NMK	Hamster Corporation	June 3, 2021	
Arcade Archives: Halley's Comet	Taito	Hamster Corporation	January 28, 2021	
Arcade Archives: Haunted Castle	Konami	Hamster Corporation	April 1, 2021	
Arcade Archives: Heroic Episode	Irem	Hamster Corporation	February 22, 2018	
Arcade Archives: Highway Race	Taito	Hamster Corporation	February 24, 2022	
Arcade Archives: Hopping Mappy	Namco	Hamster Corporation	January 20, 2022	
Arcade Archives: Hyper Sports	Konami	Hamster Corporation	November 19, 2018	
Arcade Archives: Ice Climber	Nintendo	Hamster Corporation	February 22, 2019	
Arcade Archives: Ikari Warriors	SNK	Hamster Corporation	March 7, 2019	
Arcade Archives: Ikari III: The Rescue	SNK	Hamster Corporation	March 26, 2020	
Arcade Archives: Ikki	Sunsoft	Hamster Corporation	May 24, 2018	
Arcade Archives: Image Fight	Irem	Hamster Corporation	May 23, 2019	
Arcade Archives: In the Hunt	Irem	Hamster Corporation	November 21, 2019	
Arcade Archives: Itazura Tenshi	Nichibutsu	Hamster Corporation	November 4, 2022	
Arcade Archives: Jackal	Konami	Hamster Corporation	June 27, 2024	
Arcade Archives: Jail Break	Konami	Hamster Corporation	September 14, 2023	
Arcade Archives: Jungler	Konami	Hamster Corporation	February 22, 2024	
Arcade Archives: Juno First	Konami	Hamster Corporation	March 13, 2025	
Arcade Archives: Kangaroo	Sunsoft	Hamster Corporation	July 16, 2020	
Arcade Archives: Karate Champ	Data East	Hamster Corporation	October 3, 2019	
Arcade Archives: Kid Niki: Radical Ninja	Irem	Hamster Corporation	January 25, 2018	
Arcade Archives: Kid's Horehore Daisakusen	Nichibutsu	Hamster Corporation	August 9, 2018	
Arcade Archives: KiKi KaiKai	Taito	Hamster Corporation	March 12, 2020	
Arcade Archives: King & Balloon	Namco	Hamster Corporation	July 20, 2023	
Arcade Archives: Kitten Kaboodle	Konami	Hamster Corporation	February 13, 2025	
Arcade Archives: Knuckle Heads	Namco	Hamster Corporation	August 15, 2024	
Arcade Archives: Konami's Table Tennis	Konami	Hamster Corporation	November 14, 2024	
Arcade Archives: Koutetsu Yousai Strahl	UPL	Hamster Corporation	July 22, 2020	
Arcade Archives: Kurikinton	Taito	Hamster Corporation	August 13, 2021	
Arcade Archives: Land Sea Air Squad	Taito	Hamster Corporation	March 27, 2025	
Arcade Archives: The Legend of Kage	Taito	Hamster Corporation	October 10, 2019	
Arcade Archives: Legend of Makai	Jaleco	Hamster Corporation	March 4, 2021	
Arcade Archives: The Legend of Valkyrie	Namco	Hamster Corporation	April 14, 2022	
Arcade Archives: Legion	Nichibutsu	Hamster Corporation	May 23, 2024	
Arcade Archives: Libble Rabble	Namco	Hamster Corporation	November 11, 2021	
Arcade Archives: Lightning Fighters	Konami	Hamster Corporation	August 20, 2020	
Arcade Archives: Liquid Kids	Taito	Hamster Corporation	December 2, 2021	
Arcade Archives: Mad Shark	Allumer	Hamster Corporation	August 20, 2023	
Arcade Archives: Magical Speed	Allumer	Hamster Corporation	February 9, 2023	
Arcade Archives: MagMax	Nichibutsu	Hamster Corporation	May 7, 2020	
Arcade Archives: Mappy	Namco	Hamster Corporation	October 21, 2023	
Arcade Archives: Märchen Maze	Namco	Hamster Corporation	February 6, 2025	
Arcade Archives: Mario Bros.	Nintendo	Hamster Corporation	September 27, 2017	
Arcade Archives: Markham	Sunsoft	Hamster Corporation	December 10, 2020	
Arcade Archives: Marvel Land	Namco	Hamster Corporation	December 15, 2022	
Arcade Archives: Master of Weapon	Taito	Hamster Corporation	February 15, 2024	
Arcade Archives: Mat Mania Exciting Hour	Technōs Japan	Hamster Corporation	December 19, 2019	
Arcade Archives: Mazinger Z	Banpresto	Hamster Corporation	May 11, 2023	
Arcade Archives: MegaBlast	Taito	Hamster Corporation	June 15, 2023	
Arcade Archives: Metal Black	Taito	Hamster Corporation	November 17, 2022	
Arcade Archives: Metal Hawk	Namco	Hamster Corporation	December 22, 2022	
Arcade Archives: Metamorphic Force	Konami	Hamster Corporation	October 24, 2024	
Arcade Archives: Metro-Cross	Namco	Hamster Corporation	August 18, 2022	
Arcade Archives: Mighty Guy	Nichibutsu	Hamster Corporation	January 4, 2024	
Arcade Archives: Mirai Ninja	Namco	Hamster Corporation	December 16, 2021	
Arcade Archives: Moon Cresta	Nichibutsu	Hamster Corporation	January 31, 2019	
Arcade Archives: Moon Patrol	Irem	Hamster Corporation	March 22, 2018	
Arcade Archives: Moon Shuffle	Nichibutsu	Hamster Corporation	October 3, 2024	
Arcade Archives: Motos	Namco	Hamster Corporation	June 9, 2022	
Arcade Archives: Mouser	UPL	Hamster Corporation	March 14, 2024	
Arcade Archives: Mr. Goemon	Konami	Hamster Corporation	October 31, 2019	
Arcade Archives: Mutant Night	UPL	Hamster Corporation	December 30, 2021	
Arcade Archives: MX5000	Konami	Hamster Corporation	April 9, 2020	
Arcade Archives: Mystic Warriors	Konami	Hamster Corporation	December 21, 2023	
Arcade Archives: Naughty Boy	Jaleco	Hamster Corporation	June 18, 2020	
Arcade Archives: Navarone	Namco	Hamster Corporation	March 30, 2023	
Arcade Archives: NebulasRay	Namco	Hamster Corporation	May 15, 2020	
Arcade Archives: New Rally-X	Namco	Hamster Corporation	February 3, 2022	
Arcade Archies: The NewZealand Story	Taito	Hamster Corporation	January 26, 2023	
Arcade Archives: Ninja Emaki	Nichibutsu	Hamster Corporation	July 4, 2024	
Arcade Archives: Ninja Gaiden	Tecmo	Hamster Corporation	May 9, 2019	
Arcade Archives: Ninja Kazan	Jaleco	Hamster Corporation	February 4, 2021	
Arcade Archives: Ninja-Kid	UPL	Hamster Corporation	April 5, 2018	
Arcade Archives: Ninja Kid II	UPL	Hamster Corporation	October 18, 2018	
Arcade Archives: The Ninja Kids	Taito	Hamster Corporation	August 22, 2024	
Arcade Archives: Ninja Spirit	Irem	Hamster Corporation	July 4, 2019	
Arcade Archives: The Ninja Warriors	Taito	Hamster Corporation	July 18, 2019	
Arcade Archives: Nova 2001	UPL	Hamster Corporation	July 29, 2021	
Arcade Archives: Numan Athletics	Namco	Hamster Corporation	April 25, 2024	
Arcade Archives: Omega Fighter	UPL	Hamster Corporation	July 26, 2018	
Arcade Archives: Ordyne	Namco	Hamster Corporation	October 27, 2022	
Arcade Archives: Orius	Konami	Hamster Corporation	December 23, 2021	
Arcade Archives: Othello	Success	Hamster Corporation	February 20, 2025	
Arcade Archives: P-47	Jaleco	Hamster Corporation	July 2, 2020	
Arcade Archives: P.O.W.:Prisoners of War	SNK	Hamster Corporation	March 5, 2020	
Arcade Archives: Pac & Pal	Namco	Hamster Corporation	September 1, 2022	
Arcade Archives: Pac-Land	Namco	Hamster Corporation	April 7, 2022	
Arcade Archives: Pac-Man	Namco	Hamster Corporation	September 24, 2021	
Arcade Archives: Pac-Mania	Namco	Hamster Corporation	December 8, 2022	
Arcade Archives: Penguin Wars	UPL	Hamster Corporation	January 2, 2020	
Arcade Archives: Pettan Pyuu	Sunsoft	Hamster Corporation	November 5, 2020	
Arcade Archives: Phelios	Namco	Hamster Corporation	February 2, 2023	
Arcade Archives: Phozon	Namco	Hamster Corporation	November 25, 2021	
Arcade Archives: Pinball	Nintendo	Hamster Corporation	August 30, 2019	
Arcade Archives: Pinball Action	Tecmo	Hamster Corporation	April 24, 2025	
Arcade Archives: Pirate Pete	Taito	Hamster Corporation	June 10, 2021	
Arcade Archives: Pistol Daimyo no Boken	Namco	Hamster Corporation	January 27, 2022	
Arcade Archives: Plus Alpha	Jaleco	Hamster Corporation	April 16, 2020	
Arcade Archives: Pole Position	Namco	Hamster Corporation	July 6, 2023	
Arcade Archives: Pole Position II	Namco	Hamster Corporation	December 7, 2023	
Arcade Archives: Pooyan	Konami	Hamster Corporation	June 13, 2019	
Arcade Archives: Pop Flamer	Jaleco	Hamster Corporation	September 9, 2021	
Arcade Archives: Power Spikes	Video System	Hamster Corporation	October 10, 2024	
Arcade Archives: Pro Tennis: World Court	Namco	Hamster Corporation	May 12, 2022	
Arcade Archives: Psycho Soldier	SNK	Hamster Corporation	April 25, 2019	
Arcade Archives: Punch-Out!!	Nintendo	Hamster Corporation	March 30, 2018	
Arcade Archives: Punk Shot	Konami	Hamster Corporation	May 8, 2025	
Arcade Archives: Qix	Taito	Hamster Corporation	March 10, 2022	
Arcade Archives: Rabio Lepus	Video System	Hamster Corporation	July 7, 2022	
Arcade Archives: Radical Radial	Nichibutsu	Hamster Corporation	May 14, 2020	
Arcade Archives: Raiden	Seibu Kaihatsu	Hamster Corporation	July 1, 2021	
Arcade Archives: Raiders5	UPL	Hamster Corporation	May 21, 2020	
Arcade Archives: Raimais	Taito	Hamster Corporation	November 18, 2021	
Arcade Archives: Rainbow Islands	Taito	Hamster Corporation	January 5, 2024	
Arcade Archives: Rally-X	Namco	Hamster Corporation	October 14, 2021	
Arcade Archives: Rastan Saga	Taito	Hamster Corporation	May 2, 2024	
Arcade Archives: Rastan Saga II	Taito	Hamster Corporation	June 20, 2024	
Arcade Archives: Renegade	Technōs Japan	Hamster Corporation	June 28, 2018	
Arcade Archives: The Return of Ishtar	Namco	Hamster Corporation	September 22, 2022	
Arcade Archives: Rezon	Allumer	Hamster Corporation	April 6, 2023	
Arcade Archives: Ridge Racer	Namco	Hamster Corporation	June 5, 2025	
Arcade Archives: Riot	Tecmo	Hamster Corporation	October 31, 2024	
Arcade Archives: Road Fighter	Konami	Hamster Corporation	July 25, 2019	
Arcade Archives: Rod Land	Jaleco	Hamster Corporation	January 7, 2021	
Arcade Archives: Roller Jammer	Nichibutsu	Hamster Corporation	July 28, 2022	
Arcade Archives: Rolling Thunder	Namco	Hamster Corporation	March 17, 2022	
Arcade Archives: Rolling Thunder 2	Namco	Hamster Corporation	May 25, 2023	
Arcade Archives: Rompers	Namco	Hamster Corporation	September 15, 2022	
Arcade Archives: Route-16	Sunsoft	Hamster Corporation	November 29, 2018	
Arcade Archives: Rug Rats	Nichibutsu	Hamster Corporation	June 5, 2024	
Arcade Archives: Rush'n Attack	Konami	Hamster Corporation	November 26, 2020	
Arcade Archives: Rygar	Tecmo	Hamster Corporation	September 13, 2018	
Arcade Archives: Ryukyu	Success	Hamster Corporation	May 22, 2025	
Arcade Archives: Saboten Bombers	NMK	Hamster Corporation	April 8, 2021	
Arcade Archives: Saint Dragon	Jaleco	Hamster Corporation	February 6, 2020	
Arcade Archives: Salamander	Konami	Hamster Corporation	February 27, 2020	
Arcade Archives: Sasuke vs. Commander	SNK	Hamster Corporation	February 13, 2020	
Arcade Archives: Scramble	Konami	Hamster Corporation	September 26, 2019	
Arcade Archives: Scramble Formation	Taito	Hamster Corporation	November 30, 2023	
Arcade Archives: Sea Fighter Poseidon	Taito	Hamster Corporation	July 8, 2021	
Arcade Archives: Seicross	Nichibutsu	Hamster Corporation	June 17, 2021	
Arcade Archives: Senjyo	Tecmo	Hamster Corporation	January 12, 2023	
Arcade Archives: Senkyu	Seibu Kaihatsu	Hamster Corporation	March 21, 2025	
Arcade Archives: Shanghai III	Sunsoft	Hamster Corporation	December 31, 2020	
Arcade Archives: Shao-lin's Road	Konami	Hamster Corporation	November 9, 2023	
Arcade Archives: Shingen Samurai-Fighter	Jaleco	Hamster Corporation	June 24, 2021	
Arcade Archives: Shusse Ozumo	Technōs Japan	Hamster Corporation	July 11, 2019	
Arcade Archives: Silkworm	Tecmo	Hamster Corporation	February 1, 2024	
Arcade Archives: Sky Kid	Namco	Hamster Corporation	October 28, 2021	
Arcade Archives: Sky Kid Deluxe	Namco	Hamster Corporation	March 2, 2023	
Arcade Archives: Sky Skipper	Nintendo	Hamster Corporation	July 20, 2018	
Arcade Archives: Soccer	Nintendo	Hamster Corporation	October 23, 2020	
Arcade Archives: Soldam	Jaleco	Hamster Corporation	September 16, 2021	
Arcade Archives: Soldier Girl Amazon	Nichibutsu	Hamster Corporation	June 23, 2022	
Arcade Archives: Solitary Fighter	Taito	Hamster Corporation	December 28, 2023	
Arcade Archives: Solomon's Key	Tecmo	Hamster Corporation	June 6, 2019	
Arcade Archives: Space Cruiser	Taito	Hamster Corporation	August 26, 2021	
Arcade Archives: Space Seeker	Taito	Hamster Corporation	June 16, 2022	
Arcade Archives: Spinal Breakers	Video System	Hamster Corporation	June 12, 2025	
Arcade Archives: Splatterhouse	Namco	Hamster Corporation	June 22, 2023	
Arcade Archives: Star Force	Tecmo	Hamster Corporation	March 1, 2018	
Arcade Archives: Strategy X	Konami	Hamster Corporation	June 19, 2025	
Arcade Archives: Strato Fighter	Taito	Hamster Corporation	July 13, 2023	
Arcade Archives: Strike Gunner	Athena	Hamster Corporation	September 21, 2023	
Arcade Archives: Sunset Riders	Konami	Hamster Corporation	June 11, 2020	
Arcade Archives: Super Cobra	Konami	Hamster Corporation	October 15, 2020	
Arcade Archives: Super Contra	Konami	Hamster Corporation	January 18, 2024	
Arcade Archives: Super Dimensional Fortress Macross II	Banpresto	Hamster Corporation	July 10, 2025	
Arcade Archives: Super Dodge Ball	Technōs Japan	Hamster Corporation	August 27, 2020	
Arcade Archives: Super Pac-Man	Namco	Hamster Corporation	January 6, 2022	
Arcade Archives: Super Punch-Out!!	Nintendo	Hamster Corporation	August 14, 2020	
Arcade Archives: Super Spacefortress Macross	Banpresto	Hamster Corporation	December 26, 2024	
Arcade Archives: Super Volleyball	Video System	Hamster Corporation	August 25, 2022	
Arcade Archives: Super World Court	Namco	Hamster Corporation	May 29, 2025	
Arcade Archives: Super Xevious	Namco	Hamster Corporation	May 1, 2025	
Arcade Archives: Surprise Attack	Konami	Hamster Corporation	March 21, 2024	
Arcade Archives: Swimmer	Tecmo	Hamster Corporation	March 25, 2021	
Arcade Archives: Tank Battalion	Namco	Hamster Corporation	March 7, 2024	
Arcade Archives: Tank Force	Namco	Hamster Corporation	January 19, 2023	
Arcade Archives: Task Force Harrier	UPL	Hamster Corporation	May 20, 2021	
Arcade Archives: Tatakae! Big Fighter	Nichibutsu	Hamster Corporation	April 17, 2025	
Arcade Archives: Tecmo Bowl	Tecmo	Hamster Corporation	January 30, 2020	
Arcade Archives: Tecmo Knight	Tecmo	Hamster Corporation	May 2, 2023	
Arcade Archives: Terra Cresta	Nichibutsu	Hamster Corporation	May 10, 2018	
Arcade Archives: Terra Force	Nichibutsu	Hamster Corporation	May 2, 2019	
Arcade Archives: Tetris: The Absolute - The Grand Master 2 Plus	Arika	Hamster Corporation	June 1, 2023	
Arcade Archives: Tetris: The Grand Master	Arika	Hamster Corporation	December 1, 2022	
Arcade Archives: Thunder Ceptor	Namco	Hamster Corporation	June 30, 2022	
Arcade Archives: Thunder Ceptor II	Namco	Hamster Corporation	March 16, 2023	
Arcade Archives: Thunder Cross	Konami	Hamster Corporation	February 11, 2021	
Arcade Archives: Thunder Cross II	Konami	Hamster Corporation	April 28, 2021	
Arcade Archives: Thunder Dragon	NMK	Hamster Corporation	March 11, 2021	
Arcade Archives: Thunder Dragon 2	NMK	Hamster Corporation	February 10, 2022	
Arcade Archives: Thunder Fox	Taito	Hamster Corporation	January 30, 2025	
Arcade Archives: Time Pilot	Konami	Hamster Corporation	April 11, 2019	
Arcade Archives: Time Pilot '84	Konami	Hamster Corporation	May 27, 2021	
Arcade Archives: Time Tunnel	Taito	Hamster Corporation	September 19, 2019	
Arcade Archives: The Tin Star	Taito	Hamster Corporation	April 2, 2020	
Arcade Archives: Tinkle Pit	Namco	Hamster Corporation	June 11, 2024	
Arcade Archives: T.N.K. III	SNK	Hamster Corporation	November 7, 2019	
Arcade Archives: Tōkidenshō Angel Eyes	Tecmo	Hamster Corporation	October 20, 2022	
Arcade Archives: The Tower of Druaga	Namco	Hamster Corporation	June 2, 2022	
Arcade Archives: Toy Pop	Namco	Hamster Corporation	October 13, 2022	
Arcade Archives: Track & Field	Konami	Hamster Corporation	September 12, 2019	
Arcade Archives: Traverse USA	Irem	Hamster Corporation	November 30, 2017	
Arcade Archives: Trio the Punch	Data East	Hamster Corporation	May 19, 2022	
Arcade Archives: Tube Panic	Nichibutsu	Hamster Corporation	April 23, 2020	
Arcade Archives: Turbo Force	Video System	Hamster Corporation	March 9, 2023	
Arcade Archives: Tutankham	Konami	Hamster Corporation	May 9, 2024	
Arcade Archives: TwinBee	Konami	Hamster Corporation	December 5, 2019	
Arcade Archives: Typhoon Gal	Taito	Hamster Corporation	September 30, 2021	
Arcade Archives: Urban Champion	Nintendo	Hamster Corporation	November 9, 2018	
Arcade Archives: USAAF Mustang	UPL	Hamster Corporation	September 2, 2021	
Arcade Archive: Vandyke	UPL	Hamster Corporation	August 19, 2021	
Arcade Archives: Victory Road	SNK	Hamster Corporation	August 1, 2019	
Arcade Archives: Vigilante	Irem	Hamster Corporation	September 5, 2019	
Arcade Archives: Violence Fight	Taito	Hamster Corporation	October 17, 2024	
Arcade Archives: Viper Phase 1	Seibu Kaihatsu	Hamster Corporation	December 12, 2024	
Arcade Archives: Volfied	Taito	Hamster Corporation	March 28, 2024	
Arcade Archives: VS. Balloon Fight	Nintendo	Hamster Corporation	December 27, 2019	
Arcade Archives: VS. Baseball	Nintendo	Hamster Corporation	June 19, 2020	
Arcade Archives: VS. Battle City	Namco	Hamster Corporation	September 12, 2024	
Arcade Archives: VS. Castlevania	Konami	Hamster Corporation	October 17, 2019	
Arcade Archives: VS. Family Tennis	Namco	Hamster Corporation	January 9, 2025	
Arcade Archives: VS. Gradius	Konami	Hamster Corporation	August 15, 2019	
Arcade Archives: VS. Mah-Jong	Nintendo	Hamster Corporation	February 21, 2020	
Arcade Archives: VS. Mystery Tower	Namco	Hamster Corporation	March 6, 2025	
Arcade Archives: VS. The Quest of Ki	Namco	Hamster Corporation	November 7, 2024	
Arcade Archives: VS. Star Luster	Namco	Hamster Corporation	June 13, 2024	
Arcade Archives: VS. Super Mario Bros	Nintendo	Hamster Corporation	December 22, 2017	
Arcade Archives: VS. Super Xevious: Mystery of GUMP	Namco	Hamster Corporation	April 11, 2024	
Arcade Archives: VS. Tennis	Nintendo	Hamster Corporation	December 18, 2020	
Arcade Archives: VS. The Adventure of Valkyrie: The Legend of the Key of Time	Namco	Hamster Corporation	July 25, 2024	
Arcade Archives: VS. Wrecking Crew	Nintendo	Hamster Corporation	May 1, 2020	
Arcade Archives: War of Aero	Allumer	Hamster Corporation	February 29, 2024	
Arcade Archives: Warp & Warp	Namco	Hamster Corporation	November 22, 2023	
Arcade Archives: Warrior Blade	Taito	Hamster Corporation	December 19, 2024	
Arcade Archives: Water Ski	Taito	Hamster Corporation	August 22, 2019	
Arcade Archives: Wild Western	Taito	Hamster Corporation	June 20, 2019	
Arcade Archives: Wiz	Seibu Kaihatsu	Hamster Corporation	June 25, 2020	
Arcade Archives: Wonder Momo	Namco	Hamster Corporation	March 31, 2022	
Arcade Archives: X Multiply	Irem	Hamster Corporation	August 8, 2019	
Arcade Archives: Xevious	Namco	Hamster Corporation	September 24, 2021	
Arcade Archives: XX Mission	UPL	Hamster Corporation	January 23, 2020	
Arcade Archives: Yie Ar Kung-Fu	Konami	Hamster Corporation	November 14, 2019	
Arcade Archives: Yokai Dochuki	Namco	Hamster Corporation	April 28, 2022	
Arcade Archives: Zero Team	Seibu Kaihatsu	Hamster Corporation	November 19, 2020	
Arcade Archives: Zing Zing Zip	Allumer	Hamster Corporation	September 7, 2023	
Arcade Classics Anniversary Collection	Konami	Konami	April 18, 2019	
Arcade Fuzz	QuByte Interactive	QuByte Interactive	February 25, 2020	
Arcade Love: Plus Pengo!	Triangle Service	Mebius	August 22, 2019	
Arcade Paradise	Nosebleed Interactive	Wired Productions	August 11, 2022	
Arcade Room Simulator	Zakym	Zakym	October 25, 2024	
Arcade Space Shooter 2 in 1	Moraes Game Studio	QUByte Interactive	June 17, 2021	
Arcade Spirits	Fiction Factory Games	PQube	May 1, 2020	
Arcade Spirits: The New Challengers	Fiction Factory Games	PQube	May 27, 2022	
Arcadian Atlas	Twin Otter Studios	Serenity Forge	November 30, 2023	
Arcaea	Lowiro	Lowiro	May 18, 2021	
Arcana Alchemia	Lump of Sugar	Entergram	June 27, 2024	
Arcane Arts Academy	QubicGames	QubicGames	June 4, 2021	
Arcanoid Breakout	Pix Arts	Pix Arts	January 11, 2021	
Archaica: The Path of Light	Drageus Games	Drageus Games	April 24, 2020	
Archery Blast	Benoit Varasse	Pix Arts	April 17, 2021	
Archery Club	BoomBit Games	BoomBit Games	October 29, 2021	
Archetype Arcadia	Water Phoenix	Kemco	October 21, 2021	
Archlion Saga	Hit Point	Kemco	July 18, 2019	
Arco	Franek, Max Cahill, Bibiki, Fáyer	Panic Inc.	August 15, 2024	
Are You Smarter than a 5th Grader?	Massive Miniteam	HandyGames	August 23, 2022	
Area 86	SimDevs	SimDevs	November 11, 2020	
Arena of Valor	Tencent	Tencent	September 25, 2018	
Aria Chronicle	Studio N9	CREST	July 8, 2021	
Arietta of Spirits	Third Spirits	JP: Rainy Frog; WW: Red Art Games	August 20, 2021	
Arise: A Simple Story	Piccolo Studio	Untold Tales, Techland	April 28, 2022	
Ark: Survival Evolved	Studio Wildcard	Studio Wildcard	November 30, 2018	
Arkan: The Dog Adventurer	Sometimes You	Sometimes You	June 30, 2021	
Arkanoid: Eternal Battle	Pastagames	Microids	October 27, 2022	
Arkham Horror: Mother's Embrace	Fantasy Flight Games	Asmodee Digital	March 23, 2021	
Armed 7 DX	Pixelheart	Storybird	May 14, 2020	
Armed Emeth	Hit-Point	Kemco	September 2, 2021	
Armello	League of Geeks	League of Geeks	September 27, 2018	
Arms	Nintendo EPD	Nintendo	June 16, 2017	
Arrest of a Stone Buddha	Yeo	Circle Entertainment	May 21, 2020	
Arrog	Leap Game Studios	indienova	November 26, 2020	
Art of Balance	Shin'en Multimedia	Shin'en Multimedia	October 4, 2018	
Art of Rally	Funselektor Labs	Funselektor Labs	August 12, 2021	
Art Sqool	Julian Glander	Red Deer Games	November 19, 2020	
The Artful Escape	Beethoven & Dinosaur	Annapurna Interactive	January 25, 2022	
Artifact Adventure Gaiden DX	room6	room6	June 6, 2019	
Ary and the Secret of Seasons	Exiin, Fishing Cactus	Modus Games	September 1, 2020	
Arzette: The Jewel of Faramore	Seedy Eye Software	Limited Run Games	February 14, 2024	
Asatsugutori	Nippon Ichi Software	Nippon Ichi Software	November 25, 2021	
Ascendance	Onevision Games	Onevision Games	May 9, 2019	
Ascendant Hearts	Visualnoveler	Visualnoveler	January 30, 2020	
Asdivine Cross	EXE-CREATE	Kemco	April 1, 2021	
Asdivine Dios	Exe Create	Kemco	July 4, 2019	
Asdivine Hearts	Exe Create	Kemco	April 12, 2018	
Asdivine Hearts II	Exe Create	Kemco	January 17, 2019	
Asdivine Kamura	Exe Create	Kemco	October 31, 2019	
Asdivine Menace	Exe Create	Kemco	September 5, 2019	
Asdivine Saga	EXE-CREATE	Kemco	September 30, 2021	
Asemblance	Nilo Studios	Nilo Studios	January 23, 2020	
Ash of Gods: Redemption	Aurum Dust	Koch Media	January 31, 2020	
Ash of Gods: The Way	Aurum Dust	Aurum Dust	April 27, 2023	
Ashen	A44 Games	Annapurna Interactive	December 9, 2019	
ASMR Journey: Jigsaw Puzzle	Leonardo Zufi	QUByte Interactive	July 13, 2021	
Asonde Chess ga Tsuyokunaru! Ginsei Chess DX	SilverStar	SilverStar	July 18, 2024	
Asonde Igo ga Tsuyokunaru! Ginsei Igo DX	SilverStar	SilverStar	Dec 13, 2018	
Asonde Mahjong ga Tsuyokunaru! Ginsei Mahjong DX	SilverStar	SilverStar	April 21, 2022	
Asonde Shogi ga Tsuyokunaru! Ginsei Shogi DX	SilverStar	SilverStar	December 14, 2017	
Asonde Shogi ga Tsuyokunaru! Ginsei Shogi DX2	SilverStar	SilverStar	February 24, 2022	
Asonde Tsuyokunaru! Ginsei Igo + Shogi + Mahjong DX	SilverStar	SilverStar	May 25, 2023	
Asphalt Legends	Gameloft Barcelona	Gameloft	October 8, 2019	
Aspire: Ina's Tale	Wondernaut Studio	Untold Tales	December 17, 2021	
Assassin's Creed III Remastered	Ubisoft Montreal	Ubisoft	May 21, 2019	
Assassin's Creed Odyssey	Ubisoft Quebec	Ubisoft	October 5, 2018	
Assassin's Creed: The Ezio Collection	Virtuos	Ubisoft	February 17, 2022	
Assassin's Creed: The Rebel Collection	Ubisoft Montreal	Ubisoft	December 6, 2019	
Assault Android Cactus+	Witch Beam	Witch Beam	March 7, 2019	
Assault ChaingunS KM	Regista	Dico	February 20, 2020	
Assault Gunners HD Edition	Honey Parade Games	Marvelous Europe	July 5, 2018	
Assault on Metaltron	Blue Sunset Games	Forever Entertainment	March 19, 2019	
Astalon: Tears of the Earth	LABSworks	Dangen Entertainment	June 3, 2021	
Astebreed	Edelweiss	Playism	November 8, 2018	
Asterix & Obelix: Heroes	Gamexcite	Nacon	October 5, 2023	
Asterix & Obelix: Slap Them All!	Mr. Nutz Studio	Microids	November 25, 2021	
Asterix & Obelix: Slap Them All! 2	Mr. Nutz Studio	Microids	November 13, 2023	
Asterix & Obelix XXL 2: Mission: Las Vegum	Osome Studio	Microids	November 29, 2018	
Asterix & Obelix XXL 3: The Crystal Menhir	Microids	Microids	November 21, 2019	
Asterix & Obelix XXL: Romastered	Osome Studio	Microids	October 22, 2020	
Asterix & Obelix XXXL: The Ram From Hibernia	Osome Studio	Microids	October 27, 2022	
Asteroids: Recharged	AdamVision, SneakyBox	Atari	December 14, 2021	
Astlibra Gaiden: The Cave of Phantom Mist	Keizo	WhisperGames	October 17, 2024	
Astlibra Revision	Keizo	WhisperGames	November 16, 2023	
Astral Chain	PlatinumGames	Nintendo	August 30, 2019	
Astria Ascending	Artisan Studios	Dear Villagers	September 30, 2021	
Astro Bears Party	QubicGames	QubicGames	September 28, 2017	
Astro Duel 2	Wild Rooster	Wild Rooster	March 7, 2024	
Astro Duel Deluxe	Panic Button	Panic Button	May 30, 2017	
Astrologaster	Plug In Digital	Plug In Digital	February 18, 2021	
Astroneer	System Era Softworks	System Era Softworks	January 13, 2022	
Astrosmash	BBG Entertainment	BBG Entertainment	October 12, 2023	
AstroWings: Space War	Toward	Toward	October 8, 2020	
At Sundown: Shots in the Dark	Mild Beast Games	Versus Evil	January 22, 2019	
Atama	Team Zutsuu	Indie Starter	September 19, 2024	
Atari 50: The Anniversary Celebration	Digital Eclipse	Atari	November 11, 2022	
Atari Flashback Classics	Code Mystics	Atari	December 13, 2018	
Atari Mania	iLLOGIKA	Atari	October 13, 2022	
Atari Recharged Collection 1	AdamVision, Sneakybox	Atari	October 10, 2024	
Atari Recharged Collection 2	AdamVision, Sneakybox	Atari	October 10, 2024	
Atari Recharged Collection 3	AdamVision, Sneakybox	Atari	TBA	
Atari Recharged Collection 4	AdamVision, Sneakybox	Atari	TBA	
Atelier Ayesha: The Alchemist of Dusk DX	Gust Co. Ltd.	Koei Tecmo	December 25, 2019	
Atelier Escha & Logy: Alchemists of the Dusk Sky DX	Gust Co. Ltd.	Koei Tecmo	December 25, 2019	
Atelier Firis: The Alchemist and the Mysterious Journey	Gust Co. Ltd.	Koei Tecmo	April 22, 2021	
Atelier Lulua: The Scion of Arland	Gust Co. Ltd.	Koei Tecmo	March 20, 2019	
Atelier Lydie & Suelle: The Alchemists and the Mysterious Paintings	Gust Co. Ltd.	Koei Tecmo	December 21, 2017	
Atelier Marie Remake: The Alchemist of Salburg	Gust Co. Ltd.	Koei Tecmo	July 13, 2023	
Atelier Meruru: The Apprentice of Arland	Gust Co. Ltd.	Koei Tecmo	September 20, 2018	
Atelier Resleriana: The Red Alchemist & The White Guardian	Gust Co. Ltd.	Koei Tecmo	September 26, 2025	
Atelier Rorona: The Alchemist of Arland	Gust Co. Ltd.	Koei Tecmo	September 20, 2018	
Atelier Ryza: Ever Darkness & the Secret Hideout	Gust Co. Ltd.	Koei Tecmo	September 26, 2019	
Atelier Ryza 2: Lost Legends & the Secret Fairy	Gust Co. Ltd.	Koei Tecmo	December 3, 2020	
Atelier Ryza 3: Alchemist of the End & the Secret Key	Gust Co. Ltd.	Koei Tecmo	March 24, 2023	
Atelier Shallie: Alchemists of the Dusk Sea DX	Gust Co. Ltd.	Koei Tecmo	December 25, 2019	
Atelier Sophie: The Alchemist of the Mysterious Book DX	Gust Co. Ltd.	Koei Tecmo	April 22, 2021	
Atelier Sophie 2: The Alchemist of the Mysterious Dream	Gust Co. Ltd.	Koei Tecmo	February 24, 2022	
Atelier Totori: The Adventurer of Arland DX	Gust Co. Ltd.	Koei Tecmo	December 4, 2018	
Atom RPG	Atom Team	Atent Games	September 4, 2020	
Atomic Heist	Live Aliens	Drageus Games	September 13, 2019	
Atomicrops	Bird Bath Games	JP: DMM Games; WW: Raw Fury	May 28, 2020	
Atomine	Broken Arms Games	MixedBag	May 25, 2018	
Attack of the Toy Tanks	Petite Games	Ratalaika Games	June 28, 2019	
Attack on Titan 2	Omega Force	Koei Tecmo	March 15, 2018	
Attack on Titan 2: Final Battle	Omega Force	Koei Tecmo	July 4, 2019	
ATV Drift & Tricks	Anuman Interactive	Microids	November 22, 2018	
Automachef	Hermes Interactive	Team17	July 23, 2019	
Autumn's Journey	Apple Cider	Ratalaika Games	December 11, 2020	
Avatar: The Last Airbender - The Quest for Peace	BamTang Games	Game Mill	September 22, 2023	
Avenger Bird	TiliaSoft	Ultimate Games	February 5, 2019	
Aviary Attorney: Definitive Edition	Sketchy Logic	JP: Leoful; WW: Vertical Reach	January 30, 2020	
AVICII Invector	Hello There	JP: H2 Interactive; WW: Wired Productions	September 8, 2020	
AvoCuddle	Ramez Al Tabbaa	Ultimate Games	March 2, 2020	
Awakening of Cthulhu	Kodobur Yazilim	Kodobur Yazilim	September 3, 2020	
Away: Journey to the Unexpected	Aurelien Regard	JP: Circle Entertainment; WW: Playdius Entertainment	February 7, 2019	
Awe	BadLand Publishing	BLG Publishing	December 20, 2018	
Awesome Pea	Sometimes You	Sometimes You	March 1, 2019	
Awesome Pea 2	Sometimes You	Sometimes You	June 3, 2020	
Awesome Pea 3	Sometimes You	Sometimes You	May 15, 2024	
Awkward	Snap Finger Click	Snap Finger Click	July 5, 2018	
Axe Champ!	Entity3	Entity3	August 7, 2021	
Axe Champ Shoot Out	Entity3	Entity3	November 9, 2024	
Axe Champ Vs	Entity3	Entity3	April 5, 2025	
Axes	Azur Games	Azur Games	October 30, 2020	
Axiom Verge	Thomas Happ Games	BadLand Games	October 5, 2017	
Axiom Verge 2	Thomas Happ Games	Thomas Happ Games	August 11, 2021	
Axis Football 2026	Upside Down Bird	Upside Down Bird	January 12, 2026	
AXS: Ace X Snowboard	Max Interactive Studio	Max Interactive Studio	March 12, 2021	
Ayakashi Koi Gikyoku: Forbidden Romance with Mysterious Spirit	OperaHouse Corporation	Digimerce	April 26, 2018	
Ayakashi: Romance Reborn Dawn Chapter & Twilight Chapter	Voltage	Voltage	March 4, 2021	
Ayo the Clown	Cloud M1	Cloud M1	July 28, 2021	
Azkend 2: The World Beneath	10tons	10tons	January 12, 2018	
Aztech: Forgotten Gods	Lienzo	Lienzo	March 10, 2022	
Azur Lane: Crosswave	Felistella	JP: Compile Heart; WW: Idea Factory International	September 17, 2020	
Azuran Tales: Trials	Tiny Trinket Games	Tiny Trinket Games	June 24, 2019	
Azure Reflections	Unties	Unties	August 30, 2018	
Azure Saga: Pathfinder Deluxe Edition	Toge Productions	Toge Productions	March 21, 2019	
Azure Striker Gunvolt: Striker Pack	Inti Creates	Inti Creates	August 31, 2017	
Azure Striker Gunvolt 3	Inti Creates	Inti Creates	July 28, 2022	
Azurebreak Heroes	Piotr Powroziewicz	Silesia Games	November 19, 2020	
