= Space Cruiser (disambiguation) =

Space Cruiser is a 1981 video game developed and published by Taito.

Space Cruiser may also refer to:

- Space Battleship Yamato (1977 film), a Japanese anime film released as Space Cruiser in English
- Toyota LiteAce, known as the Toyota Space Cruiser in some parts of Europe
- List of fictional spacecraft, including multiple vehicles known as cruisers
