= Tin Star =

Tin Star may refer to:

- A slang term for a sheriff in the United States
- Tin Star (video game), a 1994 video game
- Tin Star (band), a British techno band
- The Tin Star, a 1957 film
- The Tin Star (video game), a 1984 video game
- Tin Star (TV series), a British-Canadian television series
- Tin Star, a 2013 album by Lindi Ortega
