= Hulk Hogan's Main Event =

2011 video game

- Developer: Panic Button
- Publishers: NA: Majesco; EU: 505 Games
- Platform: Xbox 360 (Kinect)
- Release: NA: October 11, 2011; EU: November 18, 2011; AU: November 24, 2011
- Genres: Professional wrestling, fighting
- Mode: Single-player

Hulk Hogan's Main Event is a professional wrestling fighting game starring Hulk Hogan created by American studio Panic Button and published by Majesco for the Xbox 360. The game requires the Kinect peripheral.

== Reception ==
Reception

Aggregate score
Aggregator	Score
Metacritic	26/100

Review scores
Publication	Score
Game Informer	1/10
GameZone	1.5/10
Official Xbox Magazine (UK)	3/10
Official Xbox Magazine (US)	2/10
Common Sense Media	2/5

Hulk Hogan's Main Event received "generally unfavorable reviews" according to the review aggregation website Metacritic. Dan Ryckert of Game Informer commented that Kinect has a hard time in recognizing many required motions within the gameplay, even when the Kinect device works perfectly. Dave Rudden of Official Xbox Magazine was critical to the game, calling the career mode "boring", cartoony visual style "ugly", and the voice implementation "sloppy". In 2013, GamesRadar+ ranked it as the 40th worst game ever made. The staff criticized its poor Kinect implementation and the dated use of Hulk Hogan.
