= Aqua Moto Racing =

2009 video game

- Aqua Moto Racing Utopia cover
- Developer: Resolution Interactive
- Publisher: Resolution Interactive
- Platforms: iOS, Wii U
- Release: iOS; March 7, 2009; Wii U April 19, 2018
- Genre: Racing
- Mode: Single-player

Aqua Moto Racing is an iOS game developed by Swedish studio Resolution Interactive and released on March 7, 2009. It was followed by Aqua Moto Racing 2 (2010), Aqua Moto Racing 3D (2013), Aqua Moto Racing Utopia (2016) and Snow Moto Racing Freedom (2018). A port for Wii U was released on April 19, 2018.

== Critical reception ==
Aqua Moto Racing 2 has a Metacritic score of 85% based on 6 critic reviews.

Aqua Moto Racing 3D has a Metacritic score of 52% based on 8 critic reviews.
