= Highway Race =

1983 Video game

- Developer: Taito
- Publisher: Taito
- Platform: Arcade
- Release: JP: April 1983
- Genre: Racing
- Modes: Single-player, multiplayer
- Arcade system: Taito SJ System

Highway Race (Note: Japanese: ハイウェイレース, Hepburn: Haiwei Rēsu) is a 1983 racing video game developed and published by Taito for arcades. It was released only in Japan in April 1983. Hamster Corporation released the game outside Japan for the first time as part of their Arcade Archives series for the Nintendo Switch and PlayStation 4 on February 24, 2022.

== Gameplay ==
The player is taking part in a cross country auto race. The player car will accelerate automatically, up to its maximum speed of 218 kilometres per hour (135 mph), but it can be slowed by a brake button. Other cars on the track will attempt to crash into the player car, but if they cannot be dodged, the player car has the ability to jump to avoid them. The player has unlimited lives, but each collision—either with opponent cars or other obstacles—will deplete the car's fuel supply, and the game will end if the car runs out of fuel.

Around the race's halfway mark, a fuel truck appears with fueling arms to its left and right. The player car can refuel by contacting either of the arms, as long as it does not collide with the truck itself. As the player reaches the end of the race course, signs on the track will count down to the finish line. The player vehicle must jump prior to the finish, otherwise it will crash into the water below, ending the game. A successful jump does not mean the race is completed, as the player must, upon landing, use the brakes to safely bring the car to a stop. Points are awarded for remaining fuel at the end of the race, and the player will advance to the next race course.
