= Astro Duel =

Fighting game for Nintendo

- Home menu icon for Deluxe
- Developers: Rusty Moyher; Panic Button (Deluxe)
- Publisher: Wild Rooster
- Platforms: iOS, Windows, Nintendo Switch
- Release: iOS; June 25, 2014; Windows; February 23, 2016; Astro Duel Deluxe; May 30, 2017
- Genre: Shoot 'em up
- Modes: Single-player, multiplayer

Astro Duel is a shoot 'em up game developed by Rusty Moyher and published by Wild Rooster. It was originally released on iOS in June 2014 and Windows in February 2016. A Nintendo Switch port titled Astro Duel Deluxe developed by Panic Button was released in May 2017.

== Reception ==
Reception

Aggregate score
Aggregator	Score
Metacritic	59/100

Review scores
Publication	Score
Nintendo Life	7/10
Nintendo World Report	6.5/10

Astro Duel Deluxe has a score on review aggregator website Metacritic indicating "mixed or average" reviews.

Writing for Nintendo Life, Matt Poskitt gave the game a "good" rating of 7/10. While he panned Classic Mode, calling it a "disappointing abyss" where "fighting CPU opponents "can only hold up so long" he praised the "great quality and quantity" of the levels provided, each of which he found brought "different landscapes to maneuver and obstacles to avoid." Poskitt also praised the soundtrack, which he felt made "every fight exciting and tense". Poskitt concluded by calling Astro Duel Deluxe's multiplayer "fast-paced" and "frantic", saying that it would "have you yelling and screaming for all the right reasons," but derided its lack of a meaningful single player experience which Poskitt felt was warranted given the game's "premium" price.

In his more negative review for Nintendo World Report, Justin Nation gave the game a 6.5/10. He praised the "diverse" array of maps and options which he felt "provided variety" and the "simple but well-executed" controls while bemoaning the "short-lived" single player mode and the "sterile exercise" of fighting the CPUs within. Further derision was aimed at the lack of an online multiplayer mode as well as finding other people to play with as Poskitt felt the game "wasn't for everyone".
