= Anodyne 2: Return to Dust =

2019 video game

- Developer: Analgesic Productions
- Publisher: Analgesic Productions
- Designers: Melos Han-Tani; Marina Kittaka
- Programmer: Melos Han-Tani
- Artist: Marina Kittaka
- Composer: Melos Han-Tani
- Engine: Unity
- Platforms: Microsoft Windows macOS; Linux; Nintendo Switch; PlayStation 4 PlayStation 5 Xbox One; Xbox Series X/S
- Release: Windows, macOS, Linux; August 12, 2019; Switch, PS4, PS5, Xbox One, Xbox Series X/S; February 18, 2021
- Genre: Action-adventure
- Mode: Single-player

Anodyne 2: Return to Dust is an action-adventure game developed by Analgesic Productions. It has the central mechanic of exploring a 3D overworld with graphics inspired by the fifth generation of video game consoles, and shrinking into the bodies of the game's characters to fight enemies and solve puzzles in 2D dungeons.

The plot of Anodyne 2 is about a young woman named Nova, who becomes a Nano Cleaner when an organization called The Center tasks her with saving the island of New Theland from a harmful substance known as Dust. As she helps more of New Theland's inhabitants, Nova uncovers the truth behind The Center and Dust and reflects on her purpose.

The game released on August 12, 2019 for PC, with console ports of the game released on February 18, 2021. It is the sequel to Anodyne, released in 2013, but was developed using the Unity game engine instead of Flixel, which the first game was created with.

== Release ==
Anodyne 2 was released on August 12, 2019 for Microsoft Windows, MacOS, and Linux. Ports for PlayStation 5, PlayStation 4, Xbox Series X, Xbox One and Nintendo Switch were released on February 18, 2021.

== Reception ==
Reception

Aggregate score
Aggregator	Score
Metacritic	NS: 77/100; PS4: 71/100; PS5: 75/100

Review scores
Publication	Score
Eurogamer	Recommended
Nintendo World Report	7/10
PlayStation Official Magazine – UK	7/10

Anodyne 2 received "generally favorable reviews" for the Switch and PlayStation 5 versions but received "mixed or average reviews" for the PlayStation 4 version, according to Metacritic.

Joshua Robin of Nintendo World Report liked the visuals and soundtrack, but felt the actual gameplay was repetitive. "So much tedium is baked into actually playing it. The problems are all symbolized by the in-game elevator, which takes you to three floors that you'll visit throughout your adventure...The entire process is: walking to the elevator, pressing the down button, going through a screen transition, arriving at the middle floor, pressing the down button, going through a screen transition, and finally arriving at the bottom floor. Extrapolate this experience to almost every mechanic in the game. That's what it's like to play Anodyne 2. It's needlessly slow normally, and frustrating at the worst of times." Robin liked the story and felt the characters of Anodyne 2 were well written. "Each person you help along your journey generally comes with a short monologue about their place in the universe. These monologues easily could have been self-aggrandizing, yet they somehow straddle the line between being small enough to not forget the person speaking them and using big ideas that should still be understandable to most people."

Eurogamer's Edwin Evans-Thirlwell enjoyed the variety present in Anodyne 2's gameplay. "From these bare beginnings, Anodyne 2 finds its way to some ingenious and startling places. There's a vast spectrum of tones and genre precedents in play: one moment you're roving a vaguely solarpunk apartment complex, fetching commissions for a fashion designer, the next you're adrift on a sugar-pink purgatorial ocean redolent of both Dark Souls 2's Majula and Spirited Away." He additionally praised the visuals of the game, "I haven't seen sunsets like this since, oh, 1996. Explicitly modelled on the look and feel of 3D PS1 and N64 games... It's an exquisite recreation of a lost period in videogame landscaping, from the aliasing on the waterfalls to the smudgy paintings of distant environments that serve as portals to other areas."

Danielle Riendeau, writing for Vice thought the contrast between the 2D and 3D worlds of Anodyne 2 gave the game an impressive scope. "But there's a certain joy in enjoying both modes side by side, the tightness of the puzzle boxes next to the floatiness and abstraction of the 3D spaces, which evoke both the 3D platformers of the 32-and-64-bit era... There's a push and pull here that is aesthetically interesting and fairly bold, especially as the game goes on, as the world opens up and limits and boundaries start to crack and fade a bit more. Like the first Anodyne, this game's imagination and range is impressive, as is its creative use of space and place." Riendeau also enjoyed the themes of the story, along with its homages to older games. "This game—like Analgesic's previous work—cares about the human condition and the strange ways we relate to one another, to the point of radical earnestness. Best of all, it does this through inventive tweaks to Link to the Past's 2D dungeon formula."

=== Awards ===
Anodyne 2 was nominated for the 2019 Independent Games Festival Grand Prize.
