= Time Tunnel (1982 video game) =

1982 video game

- Arcade flyer
- Developer: Taito
- Publisher: Taito
- Platform: Arcade
- Release: JP: October 1982; EU: 1982
- Genre: Maze
- Modes: Single-player, multiplayer
- Arcade system: Taito SJ System

Time Tunnel (Note: Japanese: タイムトンネル, Hepburn: Taimu Tonneru) is a 1982 maze video game developed and published by Taito for arcades. Hamster Corporation released the game as part of their Arcade Archives series for the Nintendo Switch and PlayStation 4 in 2019.

== Gameplay ==
The player controls a train who must transport passengers to a space station through a series of railways. The player can control select intersections for the train to pass through, while avoiding obstacles such as a Shinkansen and alien creatures. The train stops when it is out of fuel, which can be refilled by arriving at a pit stop on time. Passengers can be collected at various train stations on Earth and dropped off at space stations at the second half of the level.
