= Dark Adventure =

1987 video game

- North American arcade flyer
- Developer: Konami
- Publisher: Konami
- Platform: Arcade
- Release: NA: May 22, 1987; JP: October 14, 1987
- Genre: Action-adventure
- Modes: Single-player, multiplayer

Dark Adventure, released as Majū no Ōkoku (Note: Japanese: 魔獣の王国, Hepburn: Majū no Ōkoku; lit. "The Kingdom of the Evil Beast") in Japan and Devil World in PAL territories, is a 1987 action-adventure video game developed and published by Konami for arcades. It was released on North America in May 22, 1987 and Japan on October 14, 1987. It was the first arcade game by Konami that allowed up to three players, which was only available in the North American version. Hamster Corporation released the game as part of their Arcade Archives series for the Nintendo Switch and PlayStation 4 in August 2023.

== Plot ==
An archeologist named Dr. Condor discovers the coffin of a demon in ancient ruins. During a press conference announcing his discovery, he decides to open the coffin for the first time, only to be transported into another world alongside a reporter named Labryna and another archeologist named Zorlock. The three heroes must now fight their way out of the Devil World in order to defeat the evil Demon King who is keeping them trapped and return to the human world.

== Gameplay ==
Labryna battles an enemy.

Dark Adventure can be played by up to three players, with a different character assigned to each control panel. Each character starts the game with a different default weapon: Labryna (the leftmost player) wields a sword, Condor (the center player) uses a whip, and Zorlock (the rightmost player) carries a spear. The controls for each player consist of an eight-way joystick to move their character and three action buttons for jumping, attacking and throwing dynamite. The dynamite throw button only works when the player has obtained the required power-up. There is also a map button that can be used by any of the three players. When held, the map button will pause the game and display the location of keys and exits in places explored by the player, although this function is not available in every area. The objective is to pick up the keys and unlock exits until the player has reached the lair of the final boss. There are a total of 40 areas to explore. Enemy creatures include minotaurs, skeleton warriors, swamp monsters, man-eating trees, giant spiders and rats.

The game features both limited lives and a health gauge system. The player's health will gradually drain as time goes by, even when the character is not sustaining any damage from enemies. The player must pick up soft drink cans to keep the health gauge filled and prevent the character from dying. If the player runs out of lives, the character will drop every key in his possession along with the weapon he was last carrying, allowing another player to pick it up. Extra lives can be added to the player's stock by inserting more credit into the respective coin slot.

In addition to the default weapons, the player can also pick up a flamethrower or a laser gun, allowing the character to attack enemies from a safer distance. Other power-ups include a crystal ball that enhances melee weapons, a necklace that increases the player's walking speed, a shield that reduces the amount of damage taken by attacks, and a magic orb that destroys all on-screen enemies.

== Version differences ==
Outside North America, Dark Adventure was released as a two-player conversion kit under the title of Majū no Ōkoku in Japan and as Devil World in Europe and Australia. Because of this, the third player character, Zorlock, was cut from these versions, leaving only Condor and Labryna.

The gameplay mechanics and balance were readjusted completely. Each player character now starts the game with a firearm as their default weapon instead of a melee weapon (Labryna uses a bowgun, while Condor wields a pistol). The game also uses a power-up selection meter similar to Gradius. By collecting blue power orbs, the cursor on the selection meter moves up by one level. When the cursor is on an item that the player wishes to use, they can obtain it by pressing the power-up button, which replaces the dynamite throwing button from Dark Adventure. When the player is armed with dynamites, they will instead throw it with the standard fire button while shooting their main weapon at the same time. The map button displays the whole area rather than just the portions already explored by the player. The player's health is also drained at a much slower rate.

The stages now have a much more linear structure, with almost all of them only having a single key and exit, preventing backtracking to previously cleared areas. The only exception is the thirteenth stage, Metropolis, which has numerous fake exits, including one that leads to the previous boss encounter, and a real exit. Every fourth stage now consists of a boss battle against a recurring two-headed draconic monster. Counting the dragon battles, Devil World/Majū no Ōkoku has a total of 19 stages, in contrast to the 40 stages in Dark Adventure. Credits cannot be used to add more lives during gameplay. Continues are still allowed after both players run out of lives, but only up to three times. Continues will not be available once the final stage is reached. The ending also varies depending on certain conditions. One possible ending depicts the player being transported to the top of the Statue of Liberty after defeating the final boss and is the only ending featured in Dark Adventure. The other ending shows the player stranded in the middle of the sea atop a floating raft.

== Reception ==
In Japan, Game Machine listed Dark Adventure as the fifteenth most successful table arcade unit of November 1987.
