= Anodyne (video game) =

2013 video game

- Developer: Analgesic Productions
- Publisher: Analgesic Productions
- Designers: Melos Han-Tani; Marina Kittaka
- Programmer: Melos Han-Tani
- Artist: Marina Kittaka
- Composer: Melos Han-Tani
- Engine: Flixel
- Platforms: Microsoft Windows, macOS, Linux, iOS, Android, PlayStation 4, Xbox One, Nintendo Switch
- Release: Windows, macOS, Linux; February 4, 2013 iOS; June 16, 2013; Android; October 15, 2013; PlayStation 4 September 9, 2018; Xbox One; September 21, 2018; Nintendo Switch; February 28, 2019
- Genre: Action-adventure
- Mode: Single-player

Anodyne is an action-adventure video game developed by Analgesic Productions. After a nearly year-long development through developers Melos Han-Tani and Marina Kittaka's last years in college, the game was released on February 4, 2013, for Windows PC, Mac OS X and Linux. An Android version was released as part of a Humble Bundle on October 15, 2013. The PlayStation 4 version of the game was released on September 9, 2018, the Xbox One version was released on September 21, 2018, and the Nintendo Switch version was released on February 28, 2019. The Anodyne soundtrack was also made available for purchase at the game’s initial release, including all of the music in the game as well as a few bonus tracks.

Anodyne was heavily inspired by titles like The Legend of Zelda: Link’s Awakening and Yume Nikki. It features action-adventure gameplay revolving around using a broom to fight enemies and solve puzzles. Anodyne puts the player in the shoes of the protagonist Young, exploring a surreal dream world.

Reviews of the game were mostly positive, generally praising the game's mix of action-adventure gameplay with an immersive, dream-like atmosphere created by the game's soundtrack and use of pixel art. Critiques tended to center on the story's lack of clarity, as well as some of the jumping mechanics. The game placed as an honorable mention in the 2013 Student Independent Games Festival.

A sequel to the game, Anodyne 2: Return to Dust, was released on August 12, 2019.

== Gameplay ==
Anodyne is played by exploring a dream world of the game's protagonist, Young. The gameplay involves the use of two primary items, a broom and shoes for jumping. The game takes place in adjacent screen-sized rooms that make up the game's play areas. The player explores dungeons, which are sets of rooms with puzzles and enemies, as well as other areas that focus less on combat and puzzles, such as a red, swamp-like area, and a dimly-lit forest. The player is required to find a certain number of cards in order to progress to the end sections of the game.

== Development ==
Anodyne began as a solo project by Melos Han-Tani (formerly Sean Hogan) in March 2012. Through a mutual friend, in June 2012, Han-Tani met Marina Kittaka, who worked remotely on the game until its release in February 2013. Through development, the two worked together on story themes and level design. Kittaka wrote most of the dialogue and created all of the game's artwork, while Han-Tani programmed the game and wrote its soundtrack.

Shortly after release, Anodyne was featured on the front page of The Pirate Bay which garnered the game enough votes to be accepted onto Steam through its Greenlight system.

On April 4, 2020, Han-Tani released the source code of Anodyne under a custom permissive license.

Although anybody is free to browse the game assets and code base, Analgesic noted that only paid owners of Anodyne may download and use game assets. The source code, however, has been opened up to everyone.

A complete repository of Anodyne (2013), compiled by Melos Han-Tani on April 4th, 2020 is hosted on github.com.

A complete, Basically-Open-Source* repository of Anodyne 2: Return to Dust (2019) is hosted on github.com.

=== Music ===
Anodyne's soundtrack was composed by Melos Han-Tani. At the time of Anodyne's release, the soundtrack was made available as a download-only on Han-Tani's online Bandcamp store, with the 40 tracks used in the game, as well as 14 bonus tracks, consisting of outtakes, and songs from Anodyne's trailers The total runtime is 85 minutes and 32 seconds.

Anodyne track list

No.	Title	Length
1.	"Anodyne"	0:56
2.	"Blank"	0:30
3.	"Nexus"	1:07
4.	"Street"	0:48
5.	"Woods"	1:22
6.	"Temple"	2:00
7.	"Seer"	0:35
8.	"Friend"	0:51
9.	"Fields"	2:22
10.	"Windmill"	1:53
11.	"Forest"	2:28
12.	"Cliff"	2:12
13.	"Beach"	1:18
14.	"Sea"	1:01
15.	"Grotto"	1:31
16.	"Rogue"	0:42
17.	"Cavern"	2:36
18.	"Wall"	0:25
19.	"Suburb"	1:12
20.	"Soft"	1:54
21.	"Space"	1:51
22.	"Cell"	2:02
23.	"Roof"	2:41
24.	"Hotel"	3:31
25.	"Manager"	0:31
26.	"Apartment"	3:05
27.	"Watcher"	0:32
28.	"Circus"	2:52
29.	"Servants"	0:29
30.	"Again"	0:31
31.	"Terminal"	0:27
32.	"Challenge"	2:49
33.	"Crossing"	2:51
34.	"Go"	3:03
35.	"Simmer"	0:30
36.	"Red"	1:42
37.	"Blue"	2:33
38.	"Understanding"	1:57
39.	"Stabilized"	5:47
40.	"Alpha (Sep 2012 Trailer) (bonus)"	1:11
41.	"Reminiscences (Nov 2012 Video)(bonus)"	1:16
42.	"Old Temple (Extra) (bonus)"	0:57
43.	"Older Temple (Extra) (bonus)"	1:04
44.	"Oldest Temple Extra) (bonus)"	0:44
45.	"Old Red (Extra) (bonus)"	1:53
46.	"Old Terminal (Extra) (bonus)"	0:38
47.	"Older Terminal (Extra) (bonus)"	1:20
48.	"Generic Boss (Extra) (bonus)"	1:19
49.	"Old Generic Boss "The Street" (Extra) (bonus)"	0:45
50.	"Gladysesque (Extra) (bonus)"	0:26
51.	"Bad Wall (Extra) (bonus)"	0:21
52.	"Sound Test (bonus)"	2:46
53.	"Sacrificial (Danny B Cover) (bonus)"	0:58
54.	"Release Trailer song (bonus)"	1:30
Total length:		1:25:32

On August 27, 2013, a remix compilation album was released on Han Tani's Bandcamp page, featuring arrangements of Anodyne's music from a variety of composers.

ANODYNE REMIX ALBUM track list

No.	Title	Artist	Length
1.	"friend"	bo en	2:53
2.	"Fabled Eyes"	Lifeformed	4:34
3.	"The Emerald Sea"	aivi & surasshu	4:05
4.	"Here We Are Again"	Whitaker Trebella	3:36
5.	"A Manager, a Servant and a Seer Walk into a Bar"	Chris Christodoulou	3:49
6.	"Crossing"	Sam English	3:12
7.	"Motel"	Dan FitzGerald	2:50
8.	"Dreamscapes"	Josh Freund	5:06
9.	"Roof"	Arman Bohn	3:34
10.	"Blue"	sparsevector	3:54
11.	"Cliff"	mus.hiba	2:13
12.	"Anodyne"	mathbonus	6:20
Total length:			46:06

== Reception ==
Reception

Aggregate score
Aggregator	Score
Metacritic	PC: 75/100 iOS: 72/100; XONE: 70/100

Review scores
Publication	Score
Edge	8.0/10
GameSpot	7/10
PC Gamer (US)	84/100
Polygon	8/10
TouchArcade	4/5

Anodyne was met with mixed – though overall positive – reviews, in general comparing Anodyne's gameplay to that of Zelda games such as Link's Awakening and A Link to the Past, and praising the game's pixel art and music style. Critics often praised the game's unsettling and surreal nature. Polygon's Danielle Riendeau stated that, regarding Anodyne's world: "Fantasy and reality exist adjacent to one another, highlighting the central theme of disconnection nicely."

Criticism of the game often centered around frustrating platforming sections, and the reception to Anodyne's narrative was very mixed. Regarding the story, Tom Sykes of PC Gamer stated "I doubt I’ll ever get to the root of its narrative mysteries." Josh Mattingly of Indie Statik stated "it concerns musings on the state of humanity and other existential considerations" whereas Vito of Destructoid stated "it becomes clear the developers have no interest in defining their world properly; whatever theories you might devise about the game’s hidden meaning given no real justification."
