= Antonball Deluxe =

2021 video game

- Developer: Summitsphere
- Publishers: Summitsphere, Proponent Games (ex-publisher)
- Director: Tony Grayson
- Producer: JB Long
- Designers: Tony Grayson, JB Long
- Programmers: Massimo Gauthier, Tony Grayson, JB Long, sp202, YellowAfterlife
- Artists: Max Freeman, Miggy Lazoya, John McGhee, Bernadette Perez, Cameron Reigle,
- Writer: Tony Grayson
- Composer: Tony Grayson
- Engine: GameMaker
- Platforms: Windows, Nintendo Switch
- Release: March 5, 2021: Windows; March 5, 2021; Nintendo Switch; September 28, 2021
- Genres: Platform, action, brick breaker
- Modes: Single-player, multiplayer

Antonball Deluxe is a 2021 puzzle-brick breaker-platform game developed by independent video game company Summitsphere and originally published by Proponent Games until Summitsphere took over the publishing rights. The game was released on March 5, 2021 for Microsoft Windows, with a Nintendo Switch version later released on September 28. It is the first installment of the Anton series with the game being followed up by Antonblast, a destruction-based 2D platformer released in 2024. The game features three game modes: Antonball, Punchball, and Vs. Antonball.

Antonball and Punchball are remakes of a Game Boy-styled GB game jam game: Antonball and a delisted Game Boy-styled Itch.io game: Punch Ball Antonball. The story of Antonball follows exterminator Anton Ball leaving Brulo's bar to go home, only to fall down a sewer while Punchball stars Annie Bell, where she wants to win and be the best at Brulo's Punchball tournament in order to win a lifetime supply of "Ballble Tea".

== Gameplay ==
Antonball Deluxe features three modes: Antonball, Punchball, and Vs. Antonball. Antonball and Punchball allow players to play on single player or multiplayer with up to four people, while Vs. Antonball is exclusively multiplayer with up to four players in local and online multiplayer (online only in the PC version).

=== Antonball ===
Anton, the player character hitting a brickball towards brickwalls in the first world: "Boiler Sewers" with the Antonball mode

Antonball is the main mode of the game. The gameplay is a mix between brick-breaker and 2D platforming, where the player character has to clear all of the bricks in any given stage by bumping into a flying ball. There are six stages hosting six "phases", with a bonus phase meant to gain more continues, giving the mode a total of 29 levels ("phases") and four bonus levels.

The controls of Antonball allow for the player character to jump, do a backflip that acts a double jump, a shoulder-bash that increases the speed of the ball, and aim the ball's trajectory. If the player character comes into contact of an enemy or obstacle, the player will lose a life. The player is given five lives and a continue, and losing all over restarts the level. There are also power-ups that can be used, such as a gun or two more balls.

=== Punchball ===
Annie, the player character is seen holding a Punchball in the first world: "Boiler Sewers" with the Punchball mode

Punchball is the secondary mode of the game. As with Antonball, the player has to complete a total of 29 stages and five bonus levels. It requires the player character to defeat all the enemies in a phase by throwing a Punchball at enemies and then come into contact with them to defeat them. There are no power-ups, but the lives and game-over system work the same as in Antonball.

=== Vs. Antonball ===
Gameplay of Vs. Antonball mode featuring four player characters: Anton, Annie, Danton and Nina respectively in four player co-op.

Vs. Antonball is the tertiary and final mode of the game. The gameplay is similar to that of Antonball, but limited to multiplayer. Up to four players compete to be the first one to break all of the bricks in the other player's opposing brick wall while defending their own to win. Power-ups can be found similarly to Antonball, but only the gun returns from Antonball, with a set of exclusive powerups. In total, there are 9 stages.

== Plot ==
=== Antonball ===
Anton is seen leaving Brulo's Bar with a soda in his hand, intending to go home but accidentally falls down the sewers of Boiler City. Anton goes through 29 levels from Boiler Sewers to Boiler City. In the ending, Anton fights the final boss: a Ballbuster in a tank. After defeating the Ballbuster, the tank explodes and Anton lands top of a car but chuckles in relief after realising he arrived in Boiler City. While, Anton attempts to walk to his house, he ends up falling down a sewer again.

=== Punchball ===
Annie is channel-surfing through her TV in her apartment where she discovers that Brulo is holding the very first Punchball tournament where the winner receives a lifetime supply of Ballble Tea. Annie decides to enter the tournament, where she has to knock out all the other contestants that entered the tournament within 30 levels of Punchball. In the ending, Annie shoulder bashes, Danton and Nina to receive her trophy and lifetime supply of Ballble Tea.

== Development and release ==
Antonball Deluxe was designed by indie studio Summitsphere, mainly its founder, Tony Grayson, who worked as co-coder, main-designer, and sole composer for the game. It was originally published by Propenent Games, but the publishing rights were transferred to Summitsphere.

In 2007, Tony Grayson conceptualized the first iteration of Anton's character, originally named "Red Guy", and drew him for his forum profile picture. Tony Grayson attempted to make a game with "Red Guy" multiple times, a game which would later become Antonblast in December 2024, the game was conceptualized in 2017 including the main antagonist: Satan. He nicknamed the concept "Red Guy", from Anton's original name, but it was shelved for another game: Demoltion Donkey (renamed to Harm Yarders), a beat 'em up game inspired by Battletoads. In 2018, Grayson learned that the "conventional wisdom" for indie games was that Devolver Digital was the ideal publisher for indie games. Thinking that Harm Yarders was made for Devolver's type of catalogue, that being "bloody, gory, and cartoon-y".

Grayson decided to pitch Harm Yarders to Devolver but thinking that his email would get lost due to E3 2018. Instead, he booked a flight and an industry pass for E3 2018. He met with Mike Wilson, the founder and head of Devolver Digital in the booth of the same name and told Wilson that he wanted him to sign his game. Wilson responded by letting Grayson pitch his game to his "greenlight guy". Despite receiving "good" feedback according to Grayson about how to present his ideas and Devolver liking the game, they ended up rejecting Harm Yarders.

The rejection of Harm Yarders put Summitsphere on the back-burner without a publisher, so Grayson decided to take part in a 2019 Game Boy-themed game jam called GB Jam 7 on Itch.io to blow off steam. He began development with only three days until the deadline. Grayson reused the "Red Guy" character as the protagonist for the game, Grayson was inspired by Arkanoid to make an earlier iteration of the main mode of Antonball Deluxe, Antonball in Antonball (Classic) and came up with an early, simpler iteration of the Antonball mode's gameplay. Grayson originally planned to make 99 levels but due to time constraints, it was downscaled to 6 levels, he realized he could not use the name "Red Guy" for the protagonist due to the game being in black and white, so he choose the name Anton and changed the game's title from Brickball to Antonball.

Gameplay of Antonball (Classic), a Game Boy stylized game-jam title, an early version of the Antonball mode in Antonball Deluxe

Antonball (Classic) was released on GB Jam 7 and Itch.io on August 26, 2019 for free, and got fifth place on the game jam out of the 112 games in it. Two months later, in October 2019, Antonball Deluxe was announced to be in development by Tony Grayson on his Twitter. In March 2020, Punch Ball Antonball (Classic) was released on Itch.io, like Antonball (Classic), the visuals are akin to that of a Game Boy game. It contains 6 levels and is an earlier version of Antonball Deluxe's secondary mode, Punchball. It was developed in a single day by Grayson, but was later delisted in December 2021 due to poor quality.

In May 2020, Summitsphere hinted of a fourth mode of Antonball Deluxe eventually revealed to be "Antonland" as a scrapped mode in June 2021, Antonland revisted the "Red Guy" concept of a platformer game starring Anton. It had changes to the "Red Guy" concept, with more emphasis on puzzle-platforming inspired by Donkey Kong (1994) and less emphasis on the Wario Land series inspiration. It was eventually shelved due to time constants, with Grayson thinking that it would work better as a stand-alone game rather than a mode. It ended up getting replaced by the Punchball mode. Antonland's design would later be worked into Antonblast.

In August 2020, Summitsphere signed a deal with a new publisher at the time, Proponent Games, to publish Antonball Deluxe. Proponent found Summitsphere through Twitter. Grayson was surprised at Proponent Games wanting to publish the game, as he expected that Proponent would have wanted to publish Harm Yarders during Antonball (Classic) and Antonball Deluxe's development instead.

In September 2020, Summitsphere released a 2020 demo of Antonball Deluxe for the Sonic Amateur Games Expo 2020 (SAGE 2020). It contains six levels in the Antonball mode, three levels in the Punchball mode, one stage in Vs. Antonball, five playable characters, including Snick from Pizza Tower's SAGE 2019 demo. In October 2020, Summitsphere released an updated demo of the game on Steam for the Steam Fall Festival that updated the hub, removed Snick from the game overall and replacing him with Anton's dog literally named Anton's Dog.

On March 5, 2021, Antonball Deluxe released on Steam for Microsoft Windows. In June 2021, a new demo for the game released on Steam: "Antonball Deluxe Lite", which replaced the previous demo for Steam Fall Festival. Also in June 2021, the game would receive two new pieces of downloadable content released on Steam, one featuring a new playable character: "Nothing", and a new world for each game mode. In July 2021, another piece of downloadable content released on Steam featuring another new playable character: "Fixed Gold Evil Baby Paul (Shiny)".

On September 28, 2021, the game released on Nintendo Switch with downloadable content included for free with no online mode. In November 2022, Summitsphere announced they were taking the publishing rights of the game and Antonball Deluxe Lite from Proponent Games, as well as announcing that Antonball Deluxe Lite would be delisted shortly after due to not meeting "quality standards".

== Reception ==
Reception

Aggregate scores
Aggregator	Score
Metacritic	70/100 (Note: Score based on six reviews)
OpenCritic	73% (Note: Rating based on nine reviews)

Review scores
Publication	Score
Nintendo Life	6/10
TouchArcade	3.5/5
Screen Rant	3.5/5

Antonball Deluxe received "mixed to average" reviews according to a review aggregate website Metacritic as well as a "Fair" approval rating on the aggregator OpenCritic. Critics criticized the difficulty of Antonball Deluxe as the game's main flaw, particularly the main mode Antonball. Bobby Houston from Hey Poor Player called Antonball "frustrating", with the platforming being "increasingly complex [with] awkward controls". Jamie Russo from Screen Rant complained about the mode's difficulty, stating that the "levels range from mildly difficult to nearly impossible".

However, Punchball was more well received. Critics praised Punchball for being more fair and fun. Joseph Barrood from Rapid Reviews UK called Punchball "significantly more interesting" compared to Antonball, preferring its level design over Antonball's since "the enemies and hazards seemed to counter [him] in a way, [he] could adjust and plan accordingly" while Antonball failed to change his "decision making" even in harder levels. Vs. Antonball had more split reception. While critics enjoyed the gameplay, they criticized the difficulty in finding online matches. GameFrank from Marooners' Rock called Vs. Antonball "a blast to play and definitely would make for a fun evening with friends". Stuart Gipp from Nintendo Life was more negative, finding the mode a "touch too manic to be worth more than a handful of games". Shaun Musgrave from TouchArcade favorably stated that Vs. Antonball "can be a riot with the right bunch assembled". The game's multiplayer in Antonball and Punchball was praised by Nintendo Life and called it "[Antonball Deluxe's] ace up its sleeve", and felt that the multiplayer alone was worth trying. Last Word On Gaming called the multiplayer: "The real fun [in Antonball Deluxe]".

The visuals and soundtrack were praised by critics for being reminiscent of arcade games. Last Word On Gaming was less positive, although they complimented the visuals for being "vibrant and animated" but stated they thought the music was okay but had "grating 8-bit tinny sound that can become too much to bear".

== Legacy ==
The success of Antonball Deluxe allowed Summitsphere to make another game in the Anton series, Antonblast. It released on December 3, 2024.

== Future ==
Tony Grayson expressed interest on making a remaster or sequel to Antonball Deluxe as he felt that the game's arcade focus was "great but unambitious", stating that it would be a modern take on Antonball Deluxe, wanting it to be "more on line" with Antonblast with its art and music being revamped to match with Antonblast. The game was stated to support Steam Workshop, with the potential of the Punchball mode being cut from the remaster.
