= Raiders5 =

1985 video game

- Developer: UPL
- Publisher: Taito
- Designer: Ryoichi Nishizawa
- Programmer: Nobuyuki Narita
- Platform: Arcade
- Release: JP: April 1985
- Genre: Maze
- Mode: Single-player

Raiders5 (Note: Japanese: レイダース5, Hepburn: Reidāsu5) is a 1985 maze video game developed by UPL and published by Taito for arcades. It was released only in Japan. After Hamster Corporation acquired the rights to the game alongside other UPL games, it was released as part of the Arcade Archives series outside Japan for the first time, for the PlayStation 4 in 2014 and Nintendo Switch in 2021.

== Gameplay ==
The player character controls a spaceship, must navigate mazes filled with aliens while finding the exit. Walls can be destroyed to form paths to the exit, as well as targets that can grant points to the player in addition to allowing access to the exit. The alien enemies constantly seek to destroy the player; they can be temporarily stunned by projectiles into a defensive form, allowing the player to move them out of the way, or defeated with a power-up.
