= Antonblast =

2024 video game

- Cover art design by Patrikus Droilius
- Developer: Summitsphere
- Publisher: Joystick Ventures
- Director: Tony Grayson
- Producer: JB Long
- Designers: Tony Grayson; JB Long
- Writers: Tony Grayson; JB Long
- Composer: Tony Grayson
- Engine: GameMaker
- Platforms: Windows, Nintendo Switch, PlayStation 5, PlayStation 4
- Release: Windows; December 3, 2024; Nintendo Switch; December 13, 2024; PS4, PS5; October 15, 2026
- Genre: Platform
- Mode: Single-player

Antonblast (stylized in all caps as ANTONBLAST) is a 2024 platform game developed by indie video game studio Summitsphere and published by Joystick Ventures. After a successful Kickstarter campaign, the full game was released on December 3, 2024, for Microsoft Windows, with a Nintendo Switch version later released on December 13. A Playstation 4 and Playstation 5 release for the game is set for October 15, 2026. It is the second installment in the Anton series after Antonball Deluxe. The story follows the crass alcoholic demolitions expert: Dynamite Anton and his coworker, Dynamite Annie as they set out to recover Anton's collection of spirits stolen by Satan's mole army of "Ballbusters". Satan commanded his army to steal Anton's spirits out of jealousy that Anton is redder than him. The player controls either Anton or Annie throughout 12 side-scrolling levels. At the end of every level, an escape sequence is activated and the player must travel back to the beginning within a time limit, in order to complete the level.

== Plot ==
Satan is admiring his own "redness" in his magic mirror, until it informs him that a demolition worker named Dynamite Anton has skin redder than his own. Satan demands that his army of moles discover what Anton likes the most and steal it to bait him into his lair. After the moles break into his apartment and steal his collection of spirits, Anton and his co-worker Annie go out to seek out those responsible. The pair are supported in their quest by casino owner Brulo, who promises to revoke Anton's ban from his establishment in exchange for ridding it of a Satanic curse.

After finding all of the spirits, the pair reach Satan, who proceeds to drain the player's color, making him redder, and he tosses them aside. The spirits rejuvenate and transform the player into a demon, enabling them to defeat Satan. A petulant Satan bombs the entire world in retaliation as Anton and Annie retreat to their apartment, the only structure left standing, to celebrate their victory.

== Gameplay ==
Anton, the player character, uses his "clutch" dash move in "Slowroast Sewer".

Antonblast is a platformer. The player takes control of either Dynamite Anton or Dynamite Annie as they rampage through several areas populated by Satan's minions to reclaim Anton's stolen spirits. From Brulo's Casino, which acts as the game's hub world, they can access several different levels, each of which houses a spirit. All of the spirits must be retrieved to challenge Satan and complete the game.

The player's primary means of attack is the "Clutch", a dash that destroys enemies and obstacles. Clutching in a rhythm set by a meter enhances the speed of the dash. Pressing the button just before striking an enemy or obstacle sends the player into a high-speed "Slingshot", allowing them to barrel through a series of obstacles without stopping. Pressing the same button in mid-air performs a spinning "Hammer Vault" that allows them to bounce off the floor to greater heights. The player can also roll and slide along the ground, or perform the "Antomic Blast" to plummet through the air and enter dumpsters.

Anton activates the "Happy Hour" phase in the first level: "Boiler City".

Populating levels are poker chips of different values, cassette tapes that can be played at Brulo's Casino, spray cans that unlock palette swaps for the player character, and a special collectible unique to the level. The player can spend poker chips at Brulo's Casino on permanent upgrades to their maximum health, temporary power-ups for the next level, or additional cassette tapes and spray cans.

Each level is divided into two layers: the background and foreground. The player can move between layers by jumping on special springs, and use color-coded detonators to remove blocks with a corresponding color and potentially transform the opposite layer. At the climax of each level, the player activates a clock-like detonator that triggers an event known as "Happy Hour", giving the player a time limit to return to the level's beginning before it explodes. During "Happy Hour", certain blocks that previously obstructed the player's path become intangible, and vice versa, thus creating a new route the player has to traverse in order to finish the level. Several levels instead pit the player against a boss; either one of Satan's "Bossbuster" moles, or a larger-scale boss with multiple phases.

== Development ==
=== Conception ===
Design evolution of the player character, Dynamite Anton. Top left contains Anton's previous design from Antonball Deluxe, top middle and right contains Anton's early redesign process for Antonblast, bottom left contains old key art of Anton for Antonblast from 2022 to 2024 and bottom middle contains the current iteration of Anton's design and key art for Antonblast in 2024.

Antonblast was created and self-published by independent developer Summitsphere. Founder Tony Grayson, was co-coder, designer, and sole composer for Antonblast and its predecessor. Antonblast is a successor to the studio's previous release, Antonball Deluxe, a Breakout clone with controls inspired by those of Mario Bros.. Since Antonball Deluxe proved to be a mild success, Summitsphere started work on Antonblast in June 2021. Fans of Antonball noticed similarities between Anton and the Mario character Wario and suggested that Summitsphere make the next Anton game follow the style of the Wario Land series. Coincidentally, Grayson had already considered the concept, including Satan's role as the main antagonist, in 2017, Tony Grayson himself nicknamed the concept: "Red Guy", which was Anton's original name, the concept was prior to Antonball and Antonball Deluxe's conceptualization.

During Antonball Deluxe's development in May 2020, Summitsphere gave out hints on their Twitter account regarding an eventually scrapped fourth mode called Antonland that revisited the "Red Guy" concept of a platformer game starring Anton. Antonland had changes to "Red Guy" concept with more emphasis on puzzle-platforming inspired by Donkey Kong 94 and less emphasis on the Wario Land inspiration. It was eventually shelved due to time constrants and Grayson deciding it would work better as a stand-alone game rather than a mode and the scrapped mode would become Antonblast and more like the "Red Guy" concept.

During the early stages of Antonblast's development, Grayson wanted to change Anton's design and characteristics from Antonball Deluxe to be "more interesting" and more distinct from Anton's character inspiration: Wario. Taking his characteristics from the previous game on how Anton "looks really pissed off and wants to punch a hole in his wall" and combining it with a "working vibe", Anton went from an exterminator in Deluxe to a demolition expert alongside Annie, inspiring the names of the characters to be changed from Anton Ball and Annie Bell to Dynamite Anton, and Dynamite Annie respectively as well as the demolition platforming aspect of the game. Several other characters: Annie, Danton and Nina also received redesigns to match with Anton's new design.

Antonblast's other influence is the Crash Bandicoot series. Grayson argues that arguably "Anton draws more from Crash than Wario" and credits Crash Bandicoot for inspiring Grayson to be in the industry. Ed, Edd n' Eddy inspired the game's art direction and humor. Beavis and Butthead inspired the characteristics of Anton and Annie.

=== Design ===
Antonblast draws influence from the Wario Land series, particularly Wario Land 4 and Virtual Boy Wario Land. Despite Grayson describing himself as "the biggest Wario Land fan", he had some issues with the controls of most of the games in the Wario Land series with "Wario stopping on a dime" and not liking how Wario Land 4 in particular "forces you to go fast." However, Grayson appreciated the controls of Virtual Boy Wario Land for being "really fast" with an "actual dash button". Anton's hammer and the hammer bounce was inspired by Amy Rose's hammer jump ability in Sonic Adventure, with Grayson questioning "Why hasn't anyone made a game with that [Amy Rose Hammer jump] move, it's cool!" Believing that the gaming industry did not feature many "destructive platformers", Grayson drew from Broforce and Tembo the Badass Elephant for inspiration. Grayson noted his mixed feelings about the two, he praised the focus on demolition and explosive aspects of the games but felt that they overemphasized the destructive gameplay aspects and that Tembo in particular was boring. The boost meter for the "clutch" is based on the boost meter from Crash Team Racing.

=== Release ===
Old banner used for Antonblast's Kickstarter campaign and the Steam page in 2023

Grayson pitched Antonblast to 30 publishers only for all of them to decline due to their belief that Antonblast was not a safe game to publish. Inspired by developer Renegade Kid's example, Grayson decided to forgo a publisher entirely and fund the game through a Kickstarter campaign. Although hesitant, with Summitsphere running out of options on developing Antonblast with a sustainable budget and wanting to keep the company afloat, it led to Antonblast being first revealed on May 17, 2022, alongside a Kickstarter campaign with an accompanying demo featuring the game's first level, Boiler City. On their Kickstarter page, Summitsphere cites Wario Land, Crash Bandicoot, Metroid Dread, Sonic CD, Cuphead, and Shovel Knight as influences.

Within 72 hours, Antonblast reached its crowdfunding goal of $75,000 and by the end, the campaign had garnered a total of $144,566. Grayson thanked the Kickstarter campaign for allowing Summitsphere to be saved from being shut down, commenting: "If we did not succeed [in Kickstarter], and we did not get our pay out by June, we would've been on the streets. No more Summitsphere." He also noted that some of the 30 developers who rejected Antonblast emailed back after the campaign's success, asked Summitsphere to work with them, only for Grayson to decline. The graphics are pixel art created from hand-drawn animations, scaled down before being implemented into the game. According to Grayson, he was in talks to feature Crash Bandicoot's original voice actor, Brendan O'Brien, in the game; however, O'Brien died before he could make an appearance in the game. Antonblast was featured at the Guerrilla Collective Showcase 2023, where the new "Dynamite Demo" demo was announced featuring a playable Dynamite Annie, updated mechanics and an additional level, Cinnamon Springs.

In Nintendo's Indie World Showcase on April 17, 2024, a new trailer for Antonblast was revealed, announcing a new demo was to release on the Nintendo Switch the same day featuring a brand new title screen, updated graphics, and an updated moveset. A release date for the final game was also announced: November 12, 2024, along with an update to the previous Antonblast demo on PC containing the same contents as the Switch port demo. However, on October 12, 2024, Summitsphere announced the delay of Antonblast to December 3, 2024, due to the Hurricane Milton and Hurricane Helene attacks in September affecting some of the development staff's ability to work on the game and ability to release the game on time. However, in the same announcement, they revealed the release date for the game's last demo to make up for the delay, titled "One Blast Demo". One Blast Demo was available to play at Steam Next Fest 2024 on October 14, 2024. It was later released to Steam with an graphical overhaul of Boiler City, a new level replacing Cinnamon Springs: "Slowroast Sewer", an opening cut scene, a hub world and two new modes: Time Trial and Combo Chain. On November 12, 2024, Summitsphere announced they were teaming up with Fangamer to release Antonblast physically on Nintendo Switch sometime in 2025. On November 21, 2024, the final trailer for Antonblast premiered at The MIX Fall Showcase 2024.

On November 29, 2024, the Nintendo Switch release of Antonblast was announced to be delayed to a then undeclared time period in December 2024 due to the game's performance on Switch not meeting Summitsphere and Nintendo's standards. Additionally, it was revealed that Summitsphere would be doing a Twitch livestream in anticipation of Antonblast's release on PC. Antonblast was released on the Nintendo Switch on December 13. On December 24, a patch was released to improve the game's performance on the Switch. Less than a month and a day apart, Antonblast fully recouped its costs in development and marketing, turning a profit for Summitsphere.

Pre-orders of the physical edition were made available on July 8th 2025. The physical version of Antonblast released on November 13th 2025, it contains a retro-inspired operation card, a two-sided art card, two sticker sheets and a digital downloadable for a copy of the game's soundtrack. On the first anniversary of Antonblast's release on December 3rd 2025, Summitsphere released a trailer for the final update of the game titled: "THE END". The update released on December 18th 2025 and features four new bosses against four members of "The Demon Corp", a boss rush, time based challenges containing new level layouts called "The Lime Trials", a hard mode, a new mode called "Stage Rush" which is a faster way of playing the game's levels and bosses, upgrades to the music and more.

Tony Grayson has expressed interest in PlayStation and Xbox ports of Antonblast, saying "Never say never". A port for Playstation 4 and Playstation 5 was announced in October 2025, and is scheduled to release on October 15, 2026.

=== Music ===
"Outta My Way ...It's Happy Hour!"
A 31-second excerpt from "Outta My Way ...It's Happy Hour", the escape theme.

Antonblast's music was composed by Grayson, taking inspiration from Wario Land 4. One of his most formative memories as a child was an occurrence when he first played Wario Land 4 in his mother's car, where he questioned why the music in the game's "Sound Room" sounded so "bizarre", and stated the music made him feel that his Game Boy Advance was possessed, which he stated was a "life-altering experience". Originally, Antonblast and its soundtrack were designed as something that could hypothetically run on the Game Boy Advance's hardware, by limiting the amount of sound channels used for audio.

Due to having difficulties on making music that was "really fun and listenable", he ended up not restricting himself so he would be able to make as many tracks as he wanted, using the music he made for the game and employ the songs with modern mixing techniques. He felt that that decision improved the soundtrack significantly.

== Reception ==
=== Demos ===
Time Extension writer Jack Yarwood praised the demo, appreciating Antonblast for "fill[ing] the gap" left by the lack of new Wario Land video games. Hardcore Gamer writer Kyle LeClair included Antonblast in his top 10 list of games featured at PAX East 2023, praising it as a "terrific ode" to both the Wario Land series and to the Game Boy Advance in general. He found the platforming enjoyable, calling the mechanic of jumping in and out of the background "clever", and also calling the destruction in the game "wildly-fun". Kotaku writer Kenneth Shepard included it in his list of indie games releasing in 2023 that he wanted to showcase, praising its pixel art, action, and premise.

=== Full game ===
Reception

Aggregate scores
Aggregator	Score
Metacritic	87/100 (Note: Score based on eighteen reviews)
OpenCritic	88% recommend (Note: Rating based on eighteen reviews)

Review scores
Publication	Score
Destructoid	10/10
GamesRadar+	4/5
Nintendo Life	8/10
Multiplayer.it	8/10
Vice	Recommended
TheGamer	4.5/5

Antonblast has received "generally favorable reviews" according to the review aggregate website Metacritic, and a "Mighty" approval rating on the aggregator OpenCritic. Critics praised Antonblast for its detailed Game Boy Advance-inspired visuals and animations, addictive, replayable gameplay, and soundtrack. It became the top 20 of the best reviewed games in 2024 for Metacritic. Digital Trends' Giovanni Colantonio nominated Antonblast as their prediction for "Best Indie Game" for the upcoming Game Awards 2025, he praised the game's "zany visuals, animations, and sound", labelling the visuals as "an aesthetic explosion". Giant Bomb's Scott McCrae's top 10 games of 2024 listed Antonblast on #10, he praised the game for "taking aspects of Ed, Edd n Eddy and other 90's Cartoon Network shows, the Game Boy Advance, Crash Bandicoot, and most importantly Wario Land."

=== Accolades ===
Award	Date of ceremony	Category	Result	Ref(s).
GameMaker Awards	September 25, 2024	Most Anticpated	Won	
The Digys Awards	March 13, 2025	Best Character	Nominated	
The Digys Awards	March 13, 2025	Best Laughs	Nominated	
The Digys Awards	March 13, 2025	DIGY Judge's Pick (Game of The Year)	Nominated	
The Digys Awards	March 13, 2025	DIGY Audience's Pick (Game of the Year)	Won	

== Future ==
Grayson hinted towards a potential Antonblast sequel. At first he commented that "I was expecting myself to be really burnt out and tired by the end of this. I don't want to see Anton again", but later stated that "I kinda wanna do another one... [...] You haven't seen the last of Anton. The blast of Anton, if you will."

Tony Grayson also expressed interest on making a remaster or sequel to Antonball Deluxe as he felt that the game's arcade focus was "great but unambitous." stating that it would be a modern take on Antonball with Steam Workshop support with the consideration of removing the Punchball mode in the remaster.
