= Mutant Night =

1987 video game

- Arcade flyer
- Developer(s): UPL
- Publisher(s): UPL
- Platform(s): Arcade
- Release: JP: December 1987
- Genre(s): Platform
- Mode(s): Single-player, multiplayer

Mutant Night (Note: Japanese: ミュータントナイト, Hepburn: Myūtanto Naito) is a 1987 platform video game developed and published by UPL for arcades. It was initially only released in Japan in December 1987. Hamster Corporation acquired the rights to the game alongside UPL's intellectual property, releasing the game as part of their Arcade Archives series for the PlayStation 4 in 2017 and Nintendo Switch in 2021.

== Gameplay ==
Mutant Night is a platform game where the player controls Mutron-kun, a small alien, as he defeats enemies by shooting bubbles at them while avoiding his attacks. Power ups are available in the form of small pink pods on the grounds which, when shots release a colored orb into the air, can do of the following: make Mutron-kun very large and indestructible for the short period, transform Mutron-kun into multiple creatures, award extra points or grant increased fire power in a scatter shot pattern. By pressing the jump button multiple times while still in the air, Mutron-kun can chain several jumps, reach higher positions and float in the air. Bonus colored orbs that grant points, released from the pink pods, immediately float away, forcing the player to jump higher to reach them. Mutron-kun can navigate through the air by repeated jumping for a long time, before a short fatigue renders him temporarily vulnerable to attacks.
