= Space Seeker =

1981 video game

- Developer: Taito
- Publisher: Taito
- Platform: Arcade
- Release: JP: September 1981
- Genres: Shoot 'em up, strategy
- Modes: Single-player, multiplayer
- Arcade system: Taito SJ System

Space Seeker (Note: Japanese: スペースシーカー, Hepburn: Supēsu Shīkā) is a 1981 strategy shoot 'em up video game developed and published by Taito for arcades. It was released only in Japan in September 1981 alongside Space Cruiser. Hamster Corporation released the game outside Japan for the first time as part of their Arcade Archives series for the Nintendo Switch and PlayStation 4 in June 2022.

== Gameplay ==
Space Seeker is a hybrid of a strategy video game and a shoot 'em up. The player controls a spaceship during an alien invasion of a planet. In a top-down view, the player can select the area they land on with a cursor to intercept alien attacks and stop them from attacking ally bases. The game's levels alternate between a first-person rail shooter and a horizontally scrolling shooter format. In the rail shooter levels, the player shoots aliens in front of them, moving guns side to side in a similar manner to a fixed shooter; the player cannot be harmed by enemies in these levels. In the scrolling shooter levels, the player defeats enemies as they navigate levels and avoid enemies and obstacles in the manner of Konami's Gradius series. When all enemies on a planet are destroyed, the player is sent to another planet with different levels; the game ends when the player character loses all lives.
