= Nova 2001 =

1983 video game

- North American arcade flyer
- Developer(s): UPL
- Publisher(s): UPL
- Platform(s): Arcade
- Release: JP: December 1983; NA: March 1984
- Genre(s): Multidirectional shooter
- Mode(s): Single-player, multiplayer

Nova 2001 (Note: Japanese: ノバ2001, Hepburn: Noba 2001) is a 1983 multidirectional shooter video game developed and published by UPL for arcades. It was followed by a sequel, Ark Area, in 1988, which was released only in Japan.

== Gameplay ==
The player controls a spaceship which can shoot enemy aliens in eight different directions, in a manner similar to Williams Electronics' Sinistar, which was released the same year. This was innovative at the time as technical limitations motivated developers to limit shooting to a single direction. Enemies have unique movement patterns which must be exploited to dodge their attacks and shoot them. Power-ups are available to improve the spaceship's firepower, while a limited supply of bombs can be used to clear all onscreen enemies.

== Release ==
Nova 2001 was released by UPL in Japan in December 1983 as the first game released under the UPL name and in North America in March 1984. After Hamster Corporation acquired the rights to UPL's games, they released it as part of the Arcade Archives series for the PlayStation 4 in 2014 and Nintendo Switch in 2021.
