= XX Mission =

1986 video game

- Developer: UPL
- Publishers: JP: UPL; NA: United Artists Theatres Amusement
- Platform: Arcade
- Release: JP: September 1986; NA: 1987
- Genre: Scrolling shooter
- Modes: Single-player, multiplayer

XX Mission (Note: Japanese: XXミッション, Hepburn: XX Misshon), released in North America as Mission XX, is a 1986 scrolling shooter video game developed and published by UPL for arcades. It was released in Japan in September 1986 and in North America in 1987 by United Artists Theatres Amusement as its only video game release.

Hamster Corporation acquired the rights to the game alongside UPL's intellectual property; they released the game as part of their Arcade Archives series for the Nintendo Switch and PlayStation 4 in 2020.

== Gameplay ==
The player controls a fighter plane who infiltrates military bases and defeats enemy vehicles and bases with air and ground weapons. Unconventional for a shoot 'em up, the ground weapon has infinite ammunition and works the same way as the air weapon instead of bombs with limited ammunition, allowing for more effective handling of grounded enemies. Power-ups can be obtained to improve the plane's firepower.
