= The Aquarium Does Not Dance =

- Developer: Daidai
- Publisher: Frontier Works
- Director: Daidai
- Producer: Daidai
- Designer: Daidai
- Programmer: Daidai
- Writer: Daidai
- Engine: RPG Maker MZ
- Platforms: Web, Steam, Nintendo Switch
- Genres: Adventure, Horror
- Mode: single-player

The Aquarium Does Not Dance (Japanese: アクアリウムは踊らない, Hepburn: Akuarium-wa-odoranai) is a 2024 adventure horror game by Daidai. The game was solely developed by its developer over eight years. The first part of the game was released in 2019, with the complete version released on 15 February 2024 via various storefronts. An expanded version of the game, with voice acting and extra scenarios, was released on Windows and Nintendo Switch by Gotcha Gotcha Games and Frontier Works in 2025.

== Gameplay ==
The Aquarium Does Not Dance is an adventure horror game. It is largely text heavy and exploration focused, with sprite CGs at certain moments, though there are solvable puzzles as well. For example, there is a series of fish tanks. Three out of the four are "concerned" concerning the last one. If fish food is obtained and given to the final one, a code that unlocks a door is given.

== Development ==
The game was developed by Daidai, a single individual over eight years using RPG Maker MZ.

== Reception ==
Siliconera praised the visual presentation and soundtrack, though noted two possible issues: its shortness and the fact it wasn't necessarily "scary".

== Sequel ==
A sequel, The Aquarium Does Not Dance: The Idol Who Wants to Die is under development by the creator, announced during a livestream on YouTube.
