= Rod Land =

1990 video game

- Japanese arcade flyer
- Developer: Jaleco
- Publisher: Jaleco
- Composers: Tsukasa Tawada (Arcade); Simon Pick (NES)
- Platforms: Arcade, Amiga, Amstrad CPC, Atari ST, Commodore 64, Game Boy, NES, ZX Spectrum
- Release: JP: April 1990
- Genre: Platform
- Modes: Single-player, multiplayer

Rod Land (Note: Japanese: ロッドランド, Hepburn: Roddo Rando) is a 1990 platform video game developed and published by Jaleco for arcades. Originally only released in Japan in April 1990, it was ported to various home consoles and personal computers, which were released internationally. A spin-off, Soldam, was released in 1992.

== Gameplay ==
Arcade version screenshot

The player(s) control one or two fairies called Tam and Rit armed with a magic wand (rod). Following the concept of Taito's Bubble Bobble, the rod doesn't kill the monsters directly, but only leaves them immobilized, crying. To kill them, the rod can grasp them in a magic force-field and the player can smash them repeatedly against the ground, from side to side, until they disappear and leave a power-up behind.

Each level is only one small screen composed of monsters, platforms, ladders and, later, tunnels. Unlike other games of the genre, the players can never jump, but have to use ladders. They can conjure one custom ladder above or below them in order to go to the appropriate platform. There can be only one such 'custom' ladder; therefore if the fairy summons it again, it will disappear from its previous position in order to appear again next to the fairy. This can be beneficial for the player, if a monster is climbing that ladder to approach her.

The fairies' quest is to rescue their mother, trapped in a tower. In the sequel (part of the original arcade machine) they must venture into a pyramid, to stop an evil demon that is building a mobile fortress. The spirit of their departed father "guides" them at a couple of points. The ending implies that the demon in the pyramid was somehow responsible for their father's death.

== Ports ==
Reception

Award
Publication	Award
Your Sinclair	Megagame

Rod Land was ported to many other systems, the first being the Amstrad CPC version in 1990 and the last being the Nintendo Game Boy version in 1993 (this excludes modernized remakes such as the version for Symbian mobiles in 2006).

The home versions of the game were created by The Sales Curve from their London development office. The Amiga and ST versions were coded by Ronald Pieket Weeserik and John Croudy, the Commodore 64 version by Steve Snake, the ZX Spectrum version by Jason McGann and Shaun McClure, and the NES version by Simon Pick Jools Watsham and Steve Snake. The NES version was only released in Italy, Spain, the Netherlands and Japan. The Amiga version was ranked the 16th best game of all time by Amiga Power.

All of these versions differ in some way – particularly the NES version, which adds some new platform stages and allows the player to jump – but by far the biggest difference is that the arcade version includes a totally different 'sequel' (with new graphics, levels, bosses and storyline) on completion of the original game. The enemies in the "second story" are more robotic. This sequel can be accessed directly at the start of the game, if the joystick is moved down three times between inserting a coin and pressing the 1P or 2P button.

In the Game Boy version, the player can strike enemies with the wand even while climbing a ladder, making the game slightly easier to play.

Rod Land's Amiga port was published by Storm and began development by Random Access in March 1991, and was released in September. The One interviewed Ronald Pieket Weeserik, a programmer for Rod Land's Amiga port, for information regarding its development in a pre-release interview. Weeserik notes that Rod Land's conversion was 'easier' than other titles, expressing that "it's nice to do a game that the computer is capable of emulating ... Everything in the coin-op can be included and the finished game will run at the correct frame rate". The Amiga version of Rod Land has "hidden features and bonuses" that are absent in the arcade version, revealed by entering certain codes, a feature noted by The One to be in several other Random Access titles. Rod Land's Amiga port also adds additional levels that are absent in the arcade version. The Amiga port also corrects several glitches present in the arcade version, with Weeserik giving such examples as "enemies getting stuck at the top of ladders, the ability to slam enemies down on thin air, and not being able to zap things from ladders" and further stating that they wrote the 16-bit versions in the way the arcade version should have been written.

Jaleco supplied Random Access with the background graphics for Rod Land stored as 16x16 pixel squares, although "jumbled up and in the wrong colours"; around five hundred sprites were stored this way, and this was noted as a difficulty in the Amiga port's development. During this, however, Random Access discovered unused animations for every enemy in Rod Land, which were implemented in the Amiga port as a visual indication for when monsters are changing from 'patrol mode' to 'attack mode'. Rod Land's sound effects are synthesised as opposed to sampled in the arcade original. The Amiga port replicates these, but Weeserik expresses that "several of the less suitable sounds" are replaced by "something a little more palatable".

Hamster Corporation released the arcade version as part of their Arcade Archives series for the Nintendo Switch and PlayStation 4 in January 2021.

== Legacy ==
Rod Land was followed by a 1992 puzzle spin-off titled Soldam.
