= Ark Area =

1987 video game

- Developer: UPL
- Publisher: UPL
- Platform: Arcade
- Release: JP: 1987
- Genre: Multidirectional shooter
- Modes: Single-player, multiplayer

Ark Area is a 1987 multidirectional shooter video game developed and published by UPL for arcades. Released only in Japan, it is a direct sequel to Nova 2001. Hamster Corporation acquired the game's rights alongside UPL's intellectual property, releasing the game as part of the Arcade Archives series for the PlayStation 4 in 2017 and Nintendo Switch in 2023.

== Gameplay ==
The player controls the futuristic spacecraft to shoot enemies, collect power-ups, and defeat bosses while advancing through 23 levels. If the players loses one life or more, the game will be over. However, players may continue playing by insrerting credits into the arcade machine.
