= Soldam =

1992 video game

- Japanese arcade flyer
- Developer: Jaleco
- Publisher: Jaleco
- Series: Rod Land; Soldam
- Platforms: Arcade, Game Boy, Nintendo Entertainment System
- Release: JP: September 1992; Game Boy: JP: 1993; NES: WW: 2025
- Genre: Tile-matching
- Modes: Single-player, multiplayer

Soldam (Note: Japanese: ソルダム, Hepburn: Sorudamu) is a 1992 tile-matching puzzle video game developed and published by Jaleco for arcades. It was only released in Japan in September 1992. It is a spin-off of Jaleco's previous game Rod Land. A Game Boy port was only released in Japan in 1993. A Nintendo Entertainment System version was completed but cancelled before release; Jaleco's successor City Connection released the game in 2025 in collaboration with Broke Studio and Omake Books.

City Connection released a remake, Soldam: Drop, Connect, Erase, for the Nintendo Switch in 2017 as a launch title for the console and the PlayStation 4 in 2019. Hamster Corporation released the arcade version as part of their Arcade Archives series for the Nintendo Switch and PlayStation 4 in September 2021.

== Gameplay ==
The player controls the fairies Tam and Rit as they clear rows of fruits to gain points in the manner of Puyo Puyo. The player drops a square of four fruits varying in color; if a fruit lands on those of other colors, they can change the color of fruits in a set pattern in a manner similar to reversi. When a full row of fruits are of the same color, they disappear and grant points. The game ends when the player fails to clear all rows after the area is full.

== Reception ==
Morgan Sleeper of Nintendo Life gave the remake a 8/10 score, praising its variety in gameplay, online play and quality-of-life improvements.
