= Ara Fell =

2016 video game

- Developer: Stegosoft Games
- Publisher: Dangen Entertainment
- Director: Evelyn Rose Hall
- Programmer: Joey Frost Peters
- Writer: Evelyn Rose Hall
- Composers: Louise Heaney Michael Donner Richard Lewis
- Engine: RPG Maker 2003 (Original); Unity (Enhanced Edition)
- Platforms: Microsoft Windows; Android; iOS; Linux; macOS; Nintendo Switch; PlayStation 4; Xbox One
- Release: Microsoft Windows; June 2, 2016; Enhanced Edition; Android, iOS, Linux, macOS, Windows, Switch, PS4, Xbox One; March 26, 2020
- Genre: Role-playing
- Mode: Single-player

Ara Fell is a 2016 role-playing video game developed by Stegosoft Games for Microsoft Windows. An enhanced edition of the game made in the Unity engine was published by Dangen Entertainment for Android, iOS, Linux, macOS, Microsoft Windows, Nintendo Switch, PlayStation 4, and Xbox One in March 2020.

== Plot ==
=== Setting ===
Ara Fell takes place on the floating continent of Ara Fell, which features forests, villages, castles, and other fantasy settings on several interconnected floating islands. Centuries prior to the start of the game, a great war between elves and vampires nearly led to the elves' defeat, until they solidified themselves into stone, thus preventing the vampires from feasting upon them, or turning them into vampires as well. The vampires have continued to stagnate since the end of the war, while still coming into conflict with humans, dwarves, and the other races of Ara Fell.

=== Story ===
The game begins with 16-year-old Lita and her friend Adrian exploring a series of ruins in search of a magic elvish ring. During their search, Lita is separated from Adrian and discovers the ring upon an altar. After putting it on she begins seeing a ghostly figure guide her throughout the ruins, until she becomes too exhausted to continue her escape. She is found in the morning by Adrian and her father, where she is taken back to her home in the village of Aloria and scolded. Lita reunites with Adrian, and they learn that nearly all the town pets have gone missing in recent days. They discover that the pets are being held in a secret cavern under the house of a local man named Arger, who confesses to having vampire sympathies before being defeated by Adrian and Lita. Lita is considered an archery prodigy, and enters into the local competition. She rises through the competition to face the reigning champion, and on the verge of defeat invokes the elvish power within the ring and becomes the new champion. This display of magic catches the attention of a group of visiting sorcerers, who recognize the source of Lita's new power. Forgiving his daughter, Lita's father agrees to take her on a hunting trip the following day, before being approached by the visiting group.

After heading to the Hunting Grounds to rendezvous with her father, Lita and Adrian are unable to locate him. While searching separately, the ghostly figure from the caves returns to Lita and identifies herself as Asari, an elven spirit sent to assist Lita in breaking the stone curse upon her race. She informs Lita that her ring possesses the power to dispel the curse, and to do so she must travel to the nearby Ruins of Arei in vampire territory to do so. Upon reuniting with Adrian, he and the entire village are turned into stone by the power of the ring. In a fit of despair, she is approached by the local bard, Doren, who takes her to his home, revealing that a small number were saved by the visiting sorcerers, including himself, Lita's father, and the village elder. The group agrees to accompany Lita to the ruins, but are attacked in the night by a group of vampires, leaving Lita's father and the elder bitten and mortally wounded. Doran remains behind to see to their treatment while Lita is accompanied by Seri Kesu, one of the visiting sorcerers, to the ruins. Together, they defeat the vampire clan inside, and Lita is given a second elven artifact by Asari, gaining the ability to free individuals from the stone curse. Asari also reveals that she turned the village to stone in hopes of encouraging Lita, and lifts the curse on them as well.

Lita returns to her hometown to see that all of the villagers have been freed from the stone curse, with no memory of the event. Adrian rejoins her party, as well as Doran, and the four of them make their way to Seri Kesu's home, Temple Orlian, which hold relics that will allow them to enter a vampire stronghold. The way to Orlian has been closed by order of Maranda, the regent of Castle Atana. The party makes their way to the Castle to ask for approval to travel, and it is revealed to the player that Maranda has become a vampire familiar, and is poisoning the King to maintain control. After a brief fight, the party is knocked unconscious and thrown into a prison beneath the castle, while Seri Kesu is tortured by the vampire lord Za'im. Lita, Adrian, and Doran escape from prison and free Seri Kesu, defeating a wyvern in the process and receiving the third elven artifact. The party rushes back to the Castle and defeats Za'im by using Lita's elven power to kill him. Maranda transforms into a soul-absorbing shadow creature, and is killed by the party, allowing them to save the King from his poisoning.
