= Water Ski (video game) =

1983 video game

- Developer: Taito
- Publisher: Taito
- Platform: Arcade
- Release: JP: September 1983
- Genre: Sports
- Modes: Single-player, multiplayer
- Arcade system: Taito SJ System

Water Ski (Note: Japanese: ウオータースキー, Hepburn: Uōtā Sukī) is a 1983 water skiing video game developed and published by Taito for arcades. It was released only in Japan in September 1983. Hamster Corporation released the game as part of their Arcade Archives series for the Nintendo Switch and PlayStation 4 in 2019, marking the game's first release outside Japan.

== Gameplay ==
The player rides a water ski connected to a boat, navigating the sea while avoiding obstacles within a time limit. Obstacles include random rocks, columns of rocks with tight gaps, sharks as well as passing ships. Crashing leads to the player restarting at a checkpoint, which would cost the player precious time. Ramps occasionally appear, allowing the player to score extra points if jumped from correctly, but failure would result in a crash. A second player can join in at any time.
