= Metamorphic Force =

1993 video game

- North American arcade flyer
- Developer: Konami
- Publisher: Konami
- Producers: Kazu Kouzuki; Y. Nishimura; Masahiro Inoue
- Programmers: Gen Suzuki; Tetsuya Wada; Naotaka Yoshikawa
- Artists: Yuji Asano; Satochan; Soichiro Kitai; Ricky
- Composers: Mutsuhiko Izumi; Mariko Egawa
- Platform: Arcade
- Release: August 1993
- Genre: Beat 'em up
- Modes: Single-player, multiplayer

Metamorphic Force (Note: Japanese: メタモルフィックフォース, Hepburn: Metamorufikku Fōsu) is a 1993 beat 'em up video game developed and published by Konami for arcades. It was released in Japan and North America in August 1993. It is one of Konami's last side-scrolling beat 'em up games to appear in arcades, along with Violent Storm.

Hamster Corporation released the game as part of their Arcade Archives series for the Nintendo Switch and PlayStation 4 in October 2024.

== Plot ==
The year is 199X A.D. and the Evil King Death Shadow, ruler of the Empire of Horror, has arisen from the dead to rule the world once more. The Greek goddess Athena has summoned the souls of four ancient guardians and bestowed their power upon four heroes to stop the evil once again. These guardians wield the ability to morph into anthropomorphic beasts to fight their enemies.

== Gameplay ==
Metamorphic Force features anthropomorphic animal enemies, and the player may shapeshift into an animal, as pictured here with Max (center) in the form of a werepanther.

The game's four main characters are able to morph into anthropomorphic "beasts" (referred to as Beast Mode) by collecting a Golden Statue power-up which drops from either a random chest that falls from the sky, or through an anthropomorphic rodent appearing at random times and supplying the player with either a Health Item, Score Item, or Gold Statue. The rodent will drop power-ups after a certain period of time, or if the player attacks him, similar to the elves in Golden Axe. When the players collect a Statue when already in Beast Mode, the character performs a "Screen Attack" destroying all on-screen enemies (if the Statue is collected during a boss fight, the boss is hit hard and usually twice).

The enemies are also anthropomorphic creatures such as frogmen, elephant men, lizardmen, hedgehog men, boar men, and others; and include bosses such as Cabrios the Ram-Man (similar to the pagan god Baphomet) armed with a Scythe, a Flaming Chicken-Man who wields a Sword, an Amazon Demoness, and the Dark Dragon. At the end of Stages 2 and 4, players enter a bonus stage (destroy a statue or a string of regular enemies) which awards them extra points and health.

The US version of Metamorphic Force uses a numeric lifepoint counter that doubles as the timer, going down by one lifepoint each tick (much like in Gauntlet), while the Japanese version uses a traditional health bar. The fifth stage in the US version consists of a boss rush where the player fights the previous bosses in pairs before facing the level's own boss, while in the Japanese version the player fights that level boss only. In addition, some sprites have been completely altered, such as the stained glass artwork seen during the elevator scene in the final stage.

== Reception ==
In Japan, Game Machine listed Metamorphic Force as the 17th most successful table arcade unit of September 1993. In North America, RePlay listed the game as the 19th most popular arcade game of December 1993, and Play Meter listed it as the 54th most popular arcade game of January 1994. In Europe, the game was selling well through January 1994.

== See also ==
- Therianthropy
