= Panic Button (company) =

American video game developer

Panic Button, LLC
- Type: Private
- Industry: Video games
- Founded: 2007; 19 years ago
- Founders: Craig Galley; D. Michael Traub; Russell Byrd; Aaron Smischney
- Headquarters: Austin, Texas, US
- Number of employees: <50 (2019)
- Website: panicbuttongames.com

Panic Button, LLC is an American video game developer based in Austin, Texas. Founded in late 2007, the studio is best known for their ports of AAA video games from other platforms to the Nintendo Switch console. Panic Button also does contract work on other platforms, including 4K updates for PlayStation 4 Pro and Xbox One X.

== History ==
Panic Button was founded by Craig Galley, D. Michael Traub, Russell Byrd, and Aaron Smischney. The four had worked together at video game publisher Acclaim Entertainment before joining developer Inevitable Entertainment. Inevitable Entertainment was eventually acquired by Midway Games and renamed Midway Studios Austin, after which the studio was procedurally stripped of its game development duties and was tasked with streamlining Midway's development tools and technology instead. Wishing to return to game development, the four founders left the studio and established Panic Button in Austin, Texas, at the end of 2007. Galley and Traub are still active with the company as of July 2018.

Panic Button started out experimenting with motion-based games, and for the next few years, they developed several exclusive games for the Wii and the Kinect peripheral for Xbox 360. However, interpreting the user's intent in motion games proved difficult and unreliable for them. In 2011, Adam Creighton joined Panic Button, becoming a co-owner in the company and its general manager. He instituted a focus change in the studio, wherein it turned towards port development. In 2012, Panic Button collaborated with fellow Austin company Twisted Pixel Games to make their first port for their game Ms. Splosion Man. Porting games became their main source of revenue for the next few years, although they also released their own properties such as Astro Duel Deluxe in 2017.

The company's Nintendo Switch port of Rocket League made Panic Button better known in the industry in 2017. Their Switch ports of Doom and Wolfenstein II: The New Colossus followed with similar positive responses the next year and turned Panic Button into a studio in demand. The company had started working with the Switch hardware around 2012 (including early development tech), earlier than any other studio, and they work closely with Nintendo and Nvidia. Panic Button sees the source of its success in collaborating closely with the original content makers to ensure faithful ports within the constraints of the hardware, while adding non-gimmicky elements that improve the port, such as including touch or motion controls for the Switch.

To keep a diverse portfolio, Panic Button partnered with Sony to bring the VR title To the Top from Oculus and HTC Vive to PlayStation VR in 2018; more VR ports may come should the opportunity arise. Panic Button also helped Playground Games optimize the Xbox Game Studios title Forza Horizon 4 for Xbox Series X/S in 2020, as well as port its follow-up Forza Horizon 5 to PlayStation 5 in 2025. The studio also intends to keep building their own internal properties, saying "We don't plan to reinvent the genres for the games we're making, but we want to create some very tight, well-crafted love letters to these particular genres that we think will be fun and enjoyable and replayable for folks." Creighton left Panic Button in May 2019 to form Enduring Games. Panic Button later partnered with Nintendo to develop free updates for existing Nintendo Switch games when played on Nintendo Switch 2, including patches for Arms, Super Mario Odyssey, New Super Mario Bros. U Deluxe and Super Mario 3D World + Bowser's Fury that enhance the games' resolution and performance for the improved hardware, and enable additional functionality such as the GameShare feature.

== Games developed ==
Year	Title	Platform(s)	Notes	Ref(s).
2009	Go Play Lumberjacks	Wii		
2009	We Wish You a Merry Christmas	Wii		
2010	Attack of the Movies 3D	Wii, Xbox 360		
2010	Swords	Wii		
2011	Hulk Hogan's Main Event	Xbox 360		
2012	Kinect Star Wars	Xbox 360	Additional work	
2012	Ms. Splosion Man	Windows	Port development	
2012	Top Hand Rodeo Tour	Xbox 360		
2013	Injustice: Gods Among Us	PlayStation Vita	Port development	
2015	Primal Carnage: Extinction	PlayStation 4	Port development	
2015	Octodad: Dadliest Catch	Wii U	Port development	
2016	ReCore	Windows, Xbox One	Port development	
2016	Rocket League	Xbox One, Nintendo Switch	Port development	
2017	Astro Duel Deluxe	Nintendo Switch		
2017	Doom	Nintendo Switch	Port development	
2018	To the Top	PlayStation 4	Port development	
2018	Wolfenstein II: The New Colossus	Nintendo Switch	Port development	
2018	Warframe	Nintendo Switch	Port development	
2018	Subnautica	Nintendo Switch, PlayStation 4, Xbox One	Port development	
2019	Hob: The Definitive Edition	Nintendo Switch	Port development	
2019	Wolfenstein: Youngblood	Nintendo Switch	Port development	
2019	Doom 3: BFG Edition (Note: Released as Doom 3)	Nintendo Switch, PlayStation 4, Xbox One	Port development	
2019	Torchlight II	Nintendo Switch, PlayStation 4, Xbox One	Port development	
2020	Forza Horizon 4	Xbox Series X/S	Port development	
2020	Doom Eternal	Nintendo Switch	Port development	
2021	Apex Legends	Nintendo Switch	Port development	
2021	Star Wars Jedi: Fallen Order	PlayStation 5, Xbox Series X/S	Port development	
2023	Bendy and the Dark Revival	PlayStation 4, PlayStation 5, Xbox One, Xbox Series X/S	Port development	
2025	Forza Horizon 5	PlayStation 5	Port development	
2025	Arms	Nintendo Switch 2	Development of free Switch 2 upgrade	
2025	New Super Mario Bros. U Deluxe	Nintendo Switch 2	Development of free Switch 2 upgrade	
2025	Super Mario 3D World + Bowser's Fury	Nintendo Switch 2	Development of free Switch 2 upgrade	
2025	Super Mario Odyssey	Nintendo Switch 2	Development of free Switch 2 upgrade	
2027	Forza Horizon 6	PlayStation 5	Port Development	
