= Space Cruiser =

1981 video game

- Developer: Taito
- Publisher: Taito
- Platform: Arcade
- Release: September 1981
- Genre: Fixed shooter
- Modes: Single-player, multiplayer
- Arcade system: Taito SJ System

Space Cruiser (Note: Japanese: スペースクルーザー, Hepburn: Supēsu Kurūzā) is a fixed shooter video game developed and published by Taito as an arcade video game. It was released only in Japan in September 1981 alongside Space Seeker. Hamster Corporation released the game outside Japan for the first time as part of their Arcade Archives series for the Nintendo Switch and PlayStation 4 in August 2021.

== Gameplay ==
The player controls a spaceship who travels throughout space and defeats aliens. Compared to Taito's earlier Space Invaders, the game introduces a number of innovations, including a variety of different levels and enemies moving in different patterns. The player starts off intercepting and destroying an unidentified flying object followed by flying aliens. Multiple similar levels are bridged with different sequences such as navigating an asteroid belt and gaining power-ups at space stations. The game ends after the spaceship destroys the planet spawning the aliens.
