= The Tin Star (video game) =

1983 video game

- North American arcade flyer
- Developer: Taito
- Publisher: Taito
- Platform: Arcade
- Release: JP: 1983; NA: February 1984
- Genre: Multidirectional shooter
- Modes: Single-player, multiplayer
- Arcade system: Taito SJ System

The Tin Star (Note: Japanese: ティンスター, Hepburn: Tin Sutā) is a 1983 multidirectional shooter video game developed and published by Taito for arcades. It was released in Japan in 1983 and North America in February 1984. Hamster Corporation released the game as part of their Arcade Archives series for the Nintendo Switch and PlayStation 4 in April 2020.

== Gameplay ==
The player controls a sheriff who is assigned to take out a band of thugs in three levels. He can shoot at enemies in all directions while avoiding bullets by dodging them and hiding in cover. Nearby objects such as bottles of liquor can be shot to stun enemies to the player's advantage. Bonus levels involve dueling on horseback, where the player can gain extra points with a well-timed shot at the nearby enemy.

== Release and reception ==
The Tin Star was released in Japan in 1983 and North America in February 1984. In Japan, Game Machine listed The Tin Star as the third most popular arcade game of February 1984.

Hamster Corporation released the game as part of their Arcade Archives series for the Nintendo Switch and PlayStation 4 in April 2020.
