= Super Spacefortress Macross (video game) =

1992 video game

- Developer: NMK
- Publishers: JP: Banpresto; NA: Fabtek; AU: Leisure & Allied Industries
- Producer: Toshifumi Kawashima
- Designer: Masahiko Takahashi
- Programmer: Youichi Koyama
- Artists: Eisaku Origami; Kenji Yokoyama; Hiromi Seki
- Composers: Kazunori Hideya; Manabu Namiki
- Series: Macross
- Platform: Arcade
- Release: JP: September 1992; NA: October 1992; AU: 1992
- Genre: Vertically scrolling shooter
- Modes: Single-player, multiplayer

Super Spacefortress Macross (Note: Known as Super Dimension Fortress Macross (Japanese: 超時空要塞マクロス, Hepburn: Chō Jikū Yōsai Makurosu; lit. "Super Spacetime Fortress Macross") in Japan.) is a 1992 vertically scrolling shooter video game developed by NMK and published by Banpresto for arcades. Based upon the 1984 anime film Macross: Do You Remember Love?, it is the first arcade entry in the Macross franchise. In the game, the players control the VF-1 Valkyrie variable mecha fighters, piloted by Hikaru Ichijyo and Max Jenius, in a battle against the Zentradi alien race.

Super Spacefortress Macross was created by NMK, a defunct Japanese game developer known for shooters such as P-47: The Phantom Fighter, Saint Dragon, Task Force Harrier and Zed Blade, with producer Toshifumi Kawashima heading its development. First launched in Japan by Banpresto, a subsidiary of Bandai that focused primarily on anime-licensed games, the game was later released in North America by Fabtek and in Australia by Leisure & Allied Industries, being the only Macross title that had an official international release. It remained exclusive to arcades and never received a home console conversion.

Super Spacefortress Macross proved to be moderately popular in Japan but received mixed reception from critics and retrospective commentaries; reviewers commended game's fast-pacing and intensity, but others felt mixed regarding the action, perceived lack of innovation and originality in the gameplay as well as its easy difficulty and visuals, while criticism was geared towards its predictable bosses, weapon system and difficulty to distinguish incoming hazards due to the large number of sprites displayed on-screen. It received two arcade follow-ups in the form of Super Dimension Fortress Macross II (1993) and Macross Plus (1996).

Hamster Corporation, who acquired NMK's catalogue, released the game as part of their Arcade Archives series for the Nintendo Switch and PlayStation 4 on December 26, 2024 exclusively in Japan. It was scheduled for overseas release but it was cancelled due to licensing issues with Harmony Gold USA.

== Gameplay ==
Gameplay screenshot.

Super Spacefortress Macross is a science fiction-themed vertical-scrolling shoot 'em up game that is part of the Macross series. The plot is based on the 1984 anime film Macross: Do You Remember Love?, in which the Zentradi alien race invaded the Solar System and waged a war against humanity. In response, the UN Spacy unveils the VF-1 Valkyrie, variable mecha fighters created via reverse-engineering of the alien technology obtained from the SDF-1 Macross, to confront the Zentradi.

The players control the VF-1 Valkyrie mecha fighters, piloted by Hikaru Ichijyo (1P) and Max (2P), through seven increasingly difficult stages over a constantly scrolling background, populated with an assortment of alien enemy forces and obstacles, and the scenery never stops moving until a boss is reached, which must be fought in order to progress into the next stage. After completing the last stage, the game loops back to the first stage, with the second loop increasing in difficulty and enemies fire denser bullet patterns. Defeating the second loop results in achieving the true ending.

A unique gameplay feature is the weapon system; the VF-1 Valkyrie fighters can transform into one of three different modes (Fighter, GERWALK and Battroid) by collecting the corresponding power-up icons, and the attack patterns range from spread shots to a straight laser. Each mode can be powered-up three times by obtaining "P" icons and picking up additional mode icons ("F", "G" or "B") unlock alternative "paths", providing more firepower and modified attack configurations for the Valkyrie respectively. The Valkyrie can also transform into a fourth mode (Armored Battroid), via a rare item drop that grants an extra armor and attacks using grenades with missiles. After taking an enemy hit, the armor is expelled and any power-up items collected while armored become bonus points. The Valkyrie fighters are equipped with a number of bombs at the start as well, which obliterates enemies and bullets caught within its blast radius.

In some occasions, players can pick up a Valkyrie-shaped 1UP icon, which grants an extra life. Firing on determined locations is also crucial for reaching high-scores, as certain setpieces in each stages hosts a bonus point items within their scenery, as well as destroying enemies on certain spots. The title employs a respawn system where their ship immediately starts at the location they died at. Getting hit by enemy fire or colliding against solid stage obstacles will result in losing a life, as well as a penalty of decreasing the Valkyrie's firepower to its original state, and the game is over once all lives are lost unless the players insert more credits into the arcade machine to continue playing.

== Development and release ==
Super Spacefortress Macross was developed by NMK, a defunct Japanese game developer known for shooters such as P-47: The Phantom Fighter, Saint Dragon, Task Force Harrier and Zed Blade. It is based upon Macross: Do You Remember Love?, a 1984 anime film based around Shoji Kawamori's popular Macross mecha anime series. Development was headed by producer Toshifumi Kawashima, with planner Masahiko Takahashi acting as the game's sole designer. Eisaku "Wisaku" Origami, Kenji "Ikezu Kenzi" Yokoyama and Hiromi "Kate" Seki, as well as three members under the pseudonyms "NA", "Nao" and "Mingmei" were responsible for the pixel art. Tamio "Tommy" Nakasato, programmer of Capcom's 1942, and Youichi "Ore Dayo" Koyama served as co-programmers. The soundtrack was composed by Kazunori "Hide-Kaz" Hideya, Manabu Namiki (under the alias "Taro") and H. "Papa" Mizushima.

Super Spacefortress Macross was first released in Japan in September 1992 by Banpresto, a subsidiary of Bandai that focused primarily on anime-licensed games. Prior to launch, it was first showcased in a playable state to attendees at the 1992 Amusement Machine Show from August 27 to 29. The game was later released in North America on October of the same year by Fabtek. The title was also released in Australia by Leisure & Allied Industries. It became the first arcade entry in the Macross franchise, and the only Macross title that had an official international release. The game remained exclusive to arcades and never received a conversion to home consoles.

== Reception and legacy ==
Reception

Review scores
Publication	Score
AllGame	2.5/5
Sinclair User	82/100
Digitiser	2.5/5
Gamest	28/50

Super Spacefortress Macross was moderately popular in arcades; In Japan, Game Machine listed it on their October 15, 1992 issue as being the seventh most-popular arcade game during the month. The Japanese publication Micom BASIC Magazine also ranked it at the number six spot in popularity on their December 1992 issue.

Super Spacefortress Macross garnered mixed reception from critics prior to and since its launch. Computer and Video Games' Julian Rignall described the game as "the most yawnsome, bog-standard vertically scrolling shoot 'em up I've played since the last one", criticizing its "dull" action, bland visuals, predictable end bosses and weapon system. Sinclair User's John Cook stated that the title's fast-paced action made it worth playing, but noted that it offered nothing original. Gamest's five reviewers regarded it to be a cohesive game as a whole, finding its low difficulty to be accessible but unsatisfactory when compared to more difficult shooters like Dogyuun and felt mixed regarding the graphics, as well as expressing doubt if people would play it for the brand recognition. Digitiser's Paul Rose and Tim Moore wrote that it was fun despite the lack of originality and found its gameplay to be decent. However, Rose and Moore criticized its "leathery" graphics when compared with titles like Axelay and Thunder Force IV.

Retrospective commentary for Super Spacefortress Macross has been equally mixed. AllGame's Kyle Knight found it to be a good shooter without gimmicks, stating that its gameplay was entertaining but noted the lack of innovation. Knight commended its intense action and the large number of sprites on-display, but also criticized this aspect due to the difficulty of distinguishing incoming hazards on-screen. He felt that its simple-looking background elements were reminiscent of Terra Cresta, but criticized the visuals for being outdated as well as the "dull" and repetitive music. José Ángel Ciudad of Spanish magazine GamesTech regarded it as "spectacular vertical shooter that repeats classic schemes." Retro Gamer's Stuart Hunt commended its visual style for being intricately detailed and the variety found within the levels, but also criticized this aspect for being "drab", while noting that more hardcore players would find "little" in terms of challenge. Hunt ultimately deemed it to be "a competent shooter but one that feels a bit flat against the genre's best titles."

Following the release of Super Spacefortress Macross, Banpresto would publish two more Macross arcade games: Super Dimension Fortress Macross II (1993), a horizontal-scrolling shooter based on the 1992 OVA Super Dimensional Fortress Macross II: Lovers Again developed by NMK, and Macross Plus (1996), another vertical-scrolling shooter based on the OVA and anime film of the same name developed by MOSS.
