= List of arcade video games: V =

This is a list of arcade video games organized alphabetically by name. It does not include PC or console games unless they were also released in video arcades. See Lists of video games for related lists.

Title	Alternate Title(s)	Year	Manufacturer	Genre(s)	Max. Players	PCB Model
V Goal Soccer	—	1994	Tecmo		2	
V-Five	—	1993	Toaplan			
V'Ball	—	1988	Technōs Japan	Sports		
Valkyrie no Densetsu	—	1989	Namco	Adventure	2	
Valtric	—	1986	NMK	Multi-directional shooter	2	
Vamp x 1/2	—	1999	Danbi System			
Vampire	—	1983	Ent. Enterprises			
Vampire Night	—	2001	Namco	Shooting gallery	2	
Vampire Savior	—	1997	Capcom	Fighting	2	CPS2
Van-Van Car	—	1993	Sanritsu			
Vandyke	—	1990	UPL			
Vanguard	—	1981	SNK	Scrolling shooter	2	
Vanguard II	—	1984	SNK	Scrolling shooter	2	
Vapor Trail: Hyper Offence Formation	Kuhga - Operation Code Vapor Trail	1989	Data East	Scrolling shooter	2	
Vapor TRX	—	1998	Atari Games	Racing	2	
Varia Metal	—	1995	Excellent System			
Varth: Operation Thunderstorm	—	1992	Capcom	Scrolling shooter	2	CPS1
Vasara	—	2000	Visco	Vertical shooter	2	
Vasara 2	—	2001	Visco	Vertical shooter	2	
Vastar	—	1983	Sesame Japan	Scrolling shooter	2	
Vega	—	1982	Olympia			
Vendetta	Crime Fighters 2	1991	Konami	Beat 'em up	4	
Venture	—	1981	Exidy	Action	2	
Versus Net Soccer	—	1996	Konami			
Victor 6	—	1995	American Alpha			
Victor 21	—	1990	Subsino			
Victorious Nine	—	1984	Taito			
Victory (Comsoft)	—	1982	Comsoft	Scrolling shooter	2	
Victory (Exidy)	—	1982	Exidy	Scrolling shooter	2	
Victory Banana	—	1982	Exidy	Scrolling shooter	2	
Victory Road	Dogosoken^{JP}	1986	SNK	Scrolling shooter	2	
Video 21	—	1980	Video Games, GmbH			
Video Eight Ball	—	1982	Century Electronics			
Video Hustler	—	1981	Konami			
Video Pinball	—	1979	Atari	Video pinball	4	
Video Trivia	—	1984	Greyhound Electronics			
Viewpoint	—	1992	Sammy	Scrolling shooter	2	
Vigilante	—	1988	Irem	Beat 'em up	2	
Vimana	—	1991	Toaplan	Scrolling shooter	2	
Vindicators	—	1988	Atari Games	Shooter	2	
Vindicators Part II	—	1988	Atari Games	Shooter	2	
Violence Fight	—	1989	Taito			
Violent Storm	—	1993	Konami	Beat 'em up	3	
Viper	—	1988	Leland		1	
Viper Phase 1	—	1995	Seibu Kaihatsu	Scrolling shooter	2	Seibu SPI System
Viper Phase 1 New Version	—	1995	Seibu Kaihatsu	Scrolling shooter	2	Seibu SPI System
Virtua Athlete	—	2002	Sega			NAOMI GD-ROM
Virtua Bowling	—	1996	IGS			
Virtua Cop	—	1994	Sega	Shooting gallery	2	
Virtua Cop 2	—	1995	Sega	Shooting gallery	2	
Virtua Cop 3	—	1995	Sega	Shooting gallery	2	
Virtua Fighter	—	1993	Sega	Fighting	2	
Virtua Fighter 2	—	1994	Sega	Fighting	2	
Virtua Fighter 3	—	1996	Sega	Fighting	2	
Virtua Fighter 3 Team Battle	—	1997	Sega	Fighting	2	
Virtua Fighter 4	—	2001	Sega	Fighting	2	NAOMI GD-ROM
Virtua Fighter 4 Evolution	—	2002	Sega	Fighting	2	NAOMI GD-ROM
Virtua Fighter 4 Final Tuned	—	2004	Sega	Fighting	2	NAOMI GD-ROM
Virtua Fighter 5	—	2006	Sega	Fighting	2	
Virtua Fighter Kids	—	1996	Sega	Fighting	2	
Virtua Fighter Remix	—	1995	Sega	Fighting	2	
Virtual Mahjong	—	1997	Micronet			Sega ST-V
Virtual Mahjong 2: My Fair Lady	—	1998	Micronet			Sega ST-V
Virtua NBA	—	1999	Sega		2	
Virtua Racing	—	1992	Sega	Racing	2	
Virtua Striker	—	1995	Sega	Sports	2	
Virtua Striker 2	—	1997	Sega	Sports	2	
Virtua Striker 2 version '98	—	1998	Sega	Sports	2	
Virtua Striker 2 version '99	—	1998	Sega	Sports	2	
Virtua Striker 2 ver. 2000	—	1999	Sega			NAOMI cart.
Virtua Striker 2002	—	2002	Sega	Sports	2	
Virtua Striker 3	—	2001	Sega	Sports	2	
Virtua Striker 4	—	2004	Sega	Sports	2	
Virtua Striker 4 ver. 2006	—	2004	Sega	Sports	2	
Virtua Tennis	Power Smash ^{JP}	1999	Sega	Sports	2	
Virtua Tennis 2: Sega Professional Tennis	Power Smash 2: Sega Professional Tennis ^{JP}	2007	Sega	Sports	2	
Virtua Tennis 3 - Sega Professional Tennis	Power Smash 3: Sega Professional Tennis ^{JP}	2001	Sega	Sports	2	NAOMI GD-ROM
Virtual Combat	—	1993	VR8			
Virtual On	—	1995	Sega	Fighting	2	
Virtual Pool	—	1998	Incredible Technologies			
Vision Quest	—	1992	Kramer Mfg.			
Vivid Dolls	—	1998	Visco			Aleck64
VJ Visual & Musical Slap: Dash	VJ Dash	1999	Jaleco	Rhythm game		
Volfied	—	1989	Taito	Puzzle	2	
Vortex	—	1980	Zilec			
Volley	—	1973	Ramtek			
Voltage Fighter Gowcaizer	Choujin Gakuen Gowcaizer ^{JP}	1996	Technōs Japan	Fighting	2	
Vs Mahjong Otome Ryouran	—	1998	Electro Design	Mahjong video game	2	
Vs Mahjong Triangle	—	1986	Dyna			
Vs Gong Fight	Ring King	1984	Taito			
Vs. 10-Yard Fight	—	1984	Irem			
Vs. Atari RBI Baseball	—	1987	Atari			
Vs. Balloon Fight	—	1985	Nintendo			
Vs. Baseball	—	1984	Nintendo			
Vs. Battle City	—	1987	Namco			
Vs. Castlevania	—	1985	Konami			
Vs. Clu Clu Land	—	1984	Nintendo			
Vs. Dr. Mario	—	1990	Nintendo			
Vs. Duck Hunt	—	1985	Nintendo			
Vs. Excitebike	—	1984	Nintendo			
Vs. Freedom Force	—	1988	Konami			
Vs. Gradius	—	1986	Konami			
Vs. Gumshoe	—	1986	Nintendo			
Vs. Hogan's Alley	—	1985	Nintendo			
Vs. Ice Climber	Vs. Ice Climber Dual	1984	Nintendo			
Vs. Janshi Brandnew Stars	—	1997	Jaleco			
Vs. Mach Rider	—	1985	Nintendo			
Vs. Mahjang	—	1984	Nintendo			
Vs. Mighty Bomb Jack	—	1986	Tecmo			
Vs. Ninja Jajamaru-Kun	—	1985	Jaleco			
Vs. Pinball	—	1984	Nintendo			
Vs. Platoon	—	1988	Sunsoft			
Vs. Raid on Bungeling Bay	—	1985	Nintendo			
Vs. Slalom	—	1986	Nintendo			
Vs. Soccer	—	1985	Nintendo			
Vs. Star Luster	—	1985	Namco			
Vs. Stroke and Match Golf	—	1984	Nintendo			
Vs. Super Mario Bros.	—	1986	Nintendo	Platformer	2	
Vs. Super SkyKid	—	1986	Namco			
Vs. Super Xevious: Ganpu no Nazo	—	1986	Namco			
Vs. T.K.O. Boxing	—	1987	Data East			
Vs. Tennis	—	1984	Nintendo			
Vs. Tetris	—	1988	Atari			
Vs. The Goonies	—	1986	Konami			
Vs. Top Gun	—	1987	Konami			
Vs. Wrecking Crew	—	1984	Nintendo			
Vulgus	—	1984	Capcom	Scrolling shooter	2	
