= Mr. Pig (disambiguation) =

Mr. Pig may refer to:

- Mr. Pig, 2016 Mexican film
- Mr. Pig, an alternative title for the 1987 video game Butasan
- Mr. Pig, a character who is Tree Trunks’ husband in the animated series Adventure Time
- Mr. Pig, a character from the US television series The Kill Point
