= P-47: The Phantom Fighter =

1988 video game

- Developer: NMK
- Publishers: JP/NA: Jaleco; EU: Electrocoin
- Composer: Sizlla Okamura
- Series: P-47
- Platforms: Amiga, Amstrad CPC, Arcade, Atari ST, Commodore 64, MS-DOS, PC Engine, Sega Mega Drive, ZX Spectrum
- Release: JP: May 1988; NA: August 1988; EU: 1988
- Genre: Scrolling shooter
- Modes: Single-player, multiplayer
- Arcade system: Mega System 1

P-47: The Phantom Fighter (Note: Also known as P-47: The Freedom Fighter (Japanese: P-47: ザ・フリーダム・ファイター, Hepburn: P-47: Za Furīdamu Faitā) in Japan and P47 Thunderbolt in Europe.) is a 1988 horizontally scrolling shooter video game developed by NMK and published by Jaleco for arcades. Set during World War II, players control a Republic P-47 Thunderbolt fighter aircraft to face against the Nazis, who are occupying multiple countries around the world. Its gameplay involves destroying waves of enemies, picking up power-ups and new weapons, and destroying bosses. It ran on the Mega System 1 hardware.

P-47: The Phantom Fighter was ported to home consoles and personal computers; a conversion for the Sega Mega Drive was in development, but did not receive an official release until 2025 by City Connection, Jaleco's successor. The game received positive reviews from critics, while the home ports garnered mixed response from magazines. A sequel, P-47 Aces, was released in 1995.

== Gameplay ==
Arcade screenshot

P-47: The Phantom Fighter is a horizontal-scrolling shooter game reminiscent of Silkworm, USAAF Mustang, and Hacha Mecha Fighter. Players control a Republic P-47 Thunderbolt fighter aircraft through eight stages that take place across multiple countries around the world, each with a boss at the end that must be defeated in order to progress further and face against Nazi Germany.

Some enemies carry icon-based power-up items that can be picked to increase the aircraft's firepower such as bombs and missiles as well as a speed booster to increase mobility. Getting hit by enemy fire or colliding against solid stage obstacles will result in losing a live, as well as a penalty of decreasing the aircraft's firepower and once all lives are lost, the game is over unless players insert more credits into the arcade machine to continue playing. After completing the last stage, the game begins again with the second loop increasing in difficulty. In addition to the single-player mode, the game also features a two-player cooperative multiplayer mode.

== Development ==
P-47: The Phantom Fighter's soundtrack was scored by then-NMK member Sizlla Okamura, best known for his work in Viewpoint by Aicom. In a 2017 interview with Red Bull Music Academy, Okamura recounted his experience during development as the project's composer, stating that the team wanted a game that celebrated the fight for freedom instead of war. Okamura did not wanted the music to be about "the horrors of war", leaning towards the concept of freedom being happy and fun, stating that "it might not sound like good “battle music” at first listen, but that's why it ended up the way it is." Okamura first composed the music using a Yamaha MSX computer, which featured the same sound chip Jaleco used for their arcade releases, before being converted into a useful program for his work to be played back and implemented for sound. Okamura also stated that, depending on the designers, he would be instructed to compose the music in a certain manner or let him handle the music compositions by himself. When asked about hardware limitations during the composition of music for arcade titles at the time, Okamura stated that he had to figure out how to use and work with a limited soundscape, in addition of what could be fit within limitations at the time.

== Release ==
P-47: The Phantom Fighter was first released in Japan in May 1988 and North America on August of the same year by Jaleco, as well as Europe by Electrocoin, running on the Mega System 1 board. The game was ported to various platforms including the PC Engine (published by Aicom), Amiga, Amstrad CPC, Atari ST, Commodore 64 and MS-DOS. All home computer ports were developed by Source the Software House and published by Firebird Software in Europe under the title P47 Thunderbolt. A conversion for the Sega Mega Drive under the title The Freedom Star was in development but never released, though the Mega Drive version's soundtrack was later released as part of the SUPER Rom Cassette Disc In JALECO music album by City Connection's Clarice Disk label and has since been showcased in a playable state at a Japanese gaming event.

DotEmu released the arcade version on iOS in 2011. Hamster Corporation released the game as part of their Arcade Archives series for the Nintendo Switch and PlayStation 4 in July 2020. The arcade version is also included as part of the Jaleco Arcade 1 compilation for the Evercade in 2022 as well as Antstream Arcade.

The Mega Drive conversion internally titled P-47: The Freedom Star was in development around 1990, but was cancelled for unknown reasons. After the company City Connection acquired the rights to Jaleco's catalogue back in 2014, the soundtrack for the game was released as part of the SUPER Rom Cassette Disc in Jaleco in 2015 and the unfinished version of the game was shown at various events across Japan. In 2024, it was announced the game would be getting a proper release under a new name P-47 II MD, and be finished up by Habit Soft. The game was released in Japan on March 13, 2025, with the overseas distribution being handled by Limited Run Games and Retro-Bit, which are scheduled to release sometime in May or June 2025. A new box art for the game was created by Tankro Kato, known for his Hasegawa model kit artworks. The Mega Drive version was also released in Brazil by a local game publisher (BUG or Big Uncle Games) in July 2025.

== Reception ==
=== Arcade ===
Reception

Review scores
| Publication | Score |
|---|---|
| Crash | Positive |
| Computer and Video Games | Positive |
| The Games Machine (UK) | Positive |
| Micom BASIC Magazine | 1/6 |

Award
| Publication | Award |
|---|---|
| Gamest Mook (1998) | Annual Hit Game 43rd |

Japanese magazine Game Machine listed P-47: The Phantom Fighter on their June 15, 1988 issue as being the fourth most popular arcade game at the time. The arcade version of P-47: The Phantom Fighter earned an "Annual Hit Game" award from Gamest magazine.

Commodore User praised the engaging gameplay and the graphics, stating that "this one looks set to be Jaleco's most successful product to date; it's certainly their best.". Computer and Video Games' Clare Edgeley commended the graphics and regarded the game as "well worth playing." The Games Machine's Robin Hogg and Cameron Pound commended the fun gameplay despite the standard graphics and sound. Your Sinclair's Ciarán Brennan regarded the title to be a poor Nemesis variant lacking speed and complexity, criticizing the low difficulty and uninspired sprites, stating that "this is definitely one for the fanatic."

Crash's Philip King and Mark Caswell regarded the presentation to be mediocre and the gameplay to be unoriginal but engaging, stating that "once you start blasting away, you'll find it hard to stop." ACE's Andy Smith stated that "the game's fun but it's not going to get your heart racing too much." Boris Schneider-Johne of German publication Power Play commended the visuals and bosses, though the slowdown when many sprites are on-screen was criticized but noted this was crucial for certain situations, stating that "if you want to let off steam for a few laps, "P-47" is just the thing. But if you are not a real action fan, the blast of air becomes too monotonous after half an hour at the latest."

=== Home conversions ===
Reception

Review scores
| Publication | Score |
|---|---|
| Aktueller Software Markt | (ST) 8/10 |
| Amiga Action | (AGA) 61% |
| Amiga Format | (AGA) 80% |
| Amiga User International | (AGA) 36% |
| Computer and Video Games | (PCE) 80% (ST) 72% |
| Génération 4 | (ST) 78% |
| Joystick | (ST) 81% (AGA) 84% |
| ST Action | (ST) 64% |
| Tilt | (ST) 15/20 (AGA) 15/20 |
| Zero | (ST) 75/100 |
| Zzap!64 | (AGA) 72% |
| Amiga Joker | (AGA) 58% |
| Amiga Magazin | (AGA) 4,5/12 |
| CU Amiga-64 | (AGA) 75% |
| Datormagazin | (AGA) 4/10 |
| Micro News | (ST) 2/4 |
| The One | (ST) 70% |
| Power Play | (ST) 60% |

The PC Engine version was well received by critics. Computer and Video Games' Paul Glancey praised the PC Engine port for its graphics as well as sound and gameplay, regarding it to be a "very tough arcade conversion, but veterans of computer wars past should find P-47's good blasting action both addictive and challenging." The Games Machine's Phil Harrison commended the PC Engine port for its arcade-accurate presentation and music. Readers of the Japanese PC Engine Fan magazine voted to give the PC Engine port a 20.69 out of 30 score, ranking at the number 287 spot.

The Amiga port received mixed reviews from critics. CU Amiga-64's Mike Pattenden criticized the sound and difficulty level of the Amiga port. Amiga Format's Andy Smith praised the Amiga port for its arcade-accurate presentation and co-op play. Max Magenauer of German magazine Amiga Joker gave the Amiga port a mixed outlook, criticizing the graphics as well as sound, controls and gameplay. When reviewing the Amiga port, Amiga Action's Steve McNally as well as Italian magazine Amiga Byte drew comparisons with Silkworm. Zzap!64's Stuart Wynne and Phil King commended the Amiga port for its presentation, visuals, sound and co-op feature but noted the retail price to be high for a conversion. French magazine Joystick and Tilt's Alain Huyghues-Lacour regarded the Amiga port to be superior than the Atari ST version, praising the visuals and playability. Daniel Melin of Swedish magazine Datormagazin praised the visuals but criticized other areas of the Amiga port. Amiga User International's Tony Horgan criticized the presentation, graphics, design, sound and gameplay of the Amiga port.

As with the Amiga version, the Atari ST iteration was met with mixed reception. Computer and Video Games's Paul Rand regarded the ST port of P-47 to be a playable title as well as a good arcade conversion, but noted the graphics to be "very garish." The One's Brian Nesbitt remarked that the visuals in the ST port were colorful but unremarkable while criticizing other issues, stating that "P-47's fun in a mindless sort of way, and it's tough enough to keep most players on their toes - but not for any great length of time... especially at the price." ST Action praised its appealing simplicity and playability. As with the Amiga iteration, French magazine Génération 4 as well as Micro News's Marc Lacombe and Zero's Matt Bielby drew comparisons with Silkworm when reviewing the ST port. Aktueller Software Markt's Peter Braun praised the graphics, sound and gameplay of the ST port, stating that "P 47 can be recommended to all those who are fed up with adventure and strategy construction sites and want to hit the wall again with a good action game." Martin Gaksch of German magazine Power Play commended the gameplay speed and co-op feature of the ST port but criticized various in-game issues, regarding the game to be an average shooting game. Joystick's Jean-Marc Demoly commended the ST port for its realistic-looking graphics, parallax scrolling effects, sound design and playability. Tilt's Alain Huyghues-Lacour commended the visuals and animations, recommending arcade arcade players enough to give the ST port a try.

French magazine Amstar praised the Amstrad CPC port for being "an excellent conversion of the arcade game of the same name", praising the visual presentation and difficulty level. Amstrad Action's Trenton Webb and Rod Lawton praised the CPC port for its visual presentation and addictive gameplay, though Lawton ultimately remarked that the game was "just another shoot-em-up when all's said and done". Alian of French publication Amstrad Cent Pour Cent commended the overall quality of the CPC port. Joystick's Bó TGV drew comparison with Silkworm when reviewing the CPC port but commended the conversion for its presentation and sound. Tilt's Alain Huyghues-Lacour praised the CPC port for being better than the Atari ST iteration, commending the graphics and gameplay but lamented the lack of co-op play.

Zzap!64's Stuart Wynne and Phil King regarded the Commodore 64 port to be not as slick as the Amiga iteration, criticizing the lack of co-op play as well as the visual presentation. Aktueller Software Markt's Torsten Blum regarded the C64 port to be disappointing, criticizing the jerky-scrolling background graphics and lack of music during gameplay, however the sprite animations were praised. Your Commodore's Ashley Cotter-Cairns gave the C64 port an overall negative outlook, criticizing the sprite flickering indistinct backgrounds, among other issues. Commodore Force's Miles Guttery criticized the preset enemy patterns but regarded the C64 port to be a "fair trigger exercise." The Games Machine's Warren Lapworth praised the MS-DOS port for its arcade-accurate visuals and adjustable gameplay options but criticized the sound effects and keyboard controls, stating that "P47's still a jolly little shoot-'em-up."

Crash's Mark Caswell and Nick Roberts commended the ZX Spectrum port for its visual presentation, however Caswell stated that "P-47 holds nothing new in the way it plays, but could just give the hardened shoot-'em-up fan a challenge." Sinclair User's Jim Douglas drew comparison with Silkworm but commended the visuals and playability, stating that the Spectrum port is a "clean conversion of an average coin-op. Low on skill but high on kill." Your Sinclair's Robin Candy regarded the Spectrum port to be a traditional horizontal-scrolling shoot 'em up, criticizing the overly detailed backgrounds that leads enemy bullets blend within the scenery, however Candy stated that "P47 may not be R-Type, but it's a perfectly competent and satisfying addition to the Speccy stable of shoot-'em-ups." Spanish magazine MicroHobby praised the Spectrum port for its visuals, controls, sound and replayability.

== Sequel ==
See main article: P-47 Aces

In 1995, an arcade-only sequel titled P-47 Aces was developed by NMK and published by Jaleco for the Mega System 32 hardware. The sequel has the same concept but has some differences in gameplay such as players having the option to select four different airplanes with their own unique abilities. In Japan, it proved to be a popular arcade game.
