= Bomb Jack =

1984 video game

- Arcade flyer
- Developer: Tehkan
- Publisher: Tehkan: NA: Kitkorp
- Designers: Michitaka Tsuruta; Kazutoshi Ueda
- Platform: Arcade: SG-1000, PC-88, Amstrad CPC, Commodore 64, Commodore 16, ZX Spectrum, Atari ST, Amiga, Game Boy, Windows, Java ME
- Release: March 1984: Arcade; JP: March 1984; NA: October 1984; EU: 1984 SG-1000; JP: December 1985 PC-88; JP: 1985 C64, C16, CPC, ZX Spectrum; UK: 1986 Amiga, Atari ST; UK: 1988 Game Boy; UK: November 1992 Windows; JP: May 21, 1997 Java ME; 2003
- Genre: Platform
- Modes: Single-player, multiplayer

Bomb Jack (Note: Japanese: ボンジャック, Hepburn: Bon Jakku) is a 1984 platform video game developed and published by Tehkan for arcades. It was released by Kitkorp in North America as its first arcade game. It was later ported to home systems and home computers. A commercial success, it was followed by several sequels: the console and computer game Mighty Bomb Jack, the arcade game Bomb Jack Twin, and Bomb Jack II, the last of which was licensed for home computers only.

== Gameplay ==
Arcade version, round 1

Commodore 64 version

Bomb Jack is a hero who can perform high jumps and float in the air. His goal is to collect all 24 red bombs on the screen. The game's antagonists are enemies such as birds and mummies which, once they drop in the bottom of the screen, can morph into enemies such as flying saucers and orbs that float around the screen, making Jack lose a life if he touches them.

Once one bomb is collected, bombs will light up in sequence; if one lit bomb is collected, another will light up. Collecting bombs will increase the bonus meter at the top of the screen (lit bombs increase it more). When the meter is completely filled up, a circular bouncing "P" appears, and when collected, it will turn all the enemies into bonus coins for a short period during which Jack may collect them. Other similar bonuses are the B (Bonus) which increases the score multiplier (up to 5x), the E (Extra) which gives an extra life, and the rare S (Special), which awards a free game. There are five different screens in the game, each featuring a distinct background and set of platforms (the fifth has no platforms at all). There is a special bonus for collecting 20, 21, 22, or 23 lit bombs at the end of a round.

== Reception ==
Reception

Review score
Publication	Score
Game Zone	65/100 (Game Boy)

Award
Publication	Award
Crash	Smash

In Japan, Game Machine listed Bomb Jack as the third most successful table arcade unit of May 1984. The game topped the UK all-formats software sales chart in April 1986. On the machine-specific charts, the C64 version reached number one, while the Spectrum version was kept off the top of the chart by Green Beret. Two years later, Bomb Jack returned to the top of the UK all-formats sales chart when it was re-released on the Encore budget label.

Crash magazine gave the ZX Spectrum version a 92% rating, calling it "a great arcade conversion, don't miss it", while Zzap!64 was less enthusiastic for the Commodore 64 version, giving it 47%. Commodore User gave the Amiga version 6 out of 10, citing that the Amiga should be well capable of doing better on a then-four-year-old arcade game.

== Legacy ==
=== Sequels ===
Bomb Jack II is a licensed follow-up developed for 8-bit home computers by the British games publisher Elite Systems in 1986. The game went to number one on the UK sales charts, before being replaced by Feud.

Mighty Bomb Jack, released in 1986, is largely identical to the original game in almost all factors, except that the same screen layouts from the first game in the same sequence were now linked in a map-like continuous form by scrolling passages. Mighty Bomb Jack got less favorable reviews than the original game.

Bomb Jack Twin was released in 1993 by NMK. In this version, two players could play simultaneously.

=== Re-releases ===
The game was re-released in 2004 via Tecmo Hit Parade for the PlayStation 2, followed by Tecmo Classic Arcade for the Xbox in 2005. It was released for the Virtual Console for the Wii in 2009. Hamster Corporation released the game as part of their Arcade Archives series for the PlayStation 4 in 2014 and Nintendo Switch in 2019.
