= Battle Stadium D.O.N =

2006 video game

- Cover art, featuring (L to R) Goku, Luffy, and Naruto
- Developers: Eighting; Q Entertainment
- Publisher: Namco Bandai Games
- Composers: Hitoshi Sakimoto; Manabu Namiki; Kimihiro Abe; Kenichi Koyano; Masaharu Iwata; Mitsuhiro Kaneda
- Series: Shōnen Jump
- Platforms: GameCube, PlayStation 2
- Release: JP: July 20, 2006
- Genre: Fighting
- Modes: Single-player, multiplayer

Battle Stadium D.O.N (Note: Japanese: バトルスタジアムDON) is a 2006 Japanese crossover fighting game developed by Eighting and Q Entertainment and published by Namco Bandai Games for the GameCube and PlayStation 2. The "D.O.N." in the game's title is derived from Dragon Ball Z, One Piece, and Naruto, the three manga series published by Weekly Shōnen Jump upon which the game is based.

== Gameplay ==
Battle Stadium D.O.N. is a platform fighter, in which up to four players battle on one of 11 dynamic stages in battles based around free-roaming two-dimensional character movement. Unlike other fighting games, D.O.N uses a "tug-of-war" fighting system. Attacking opponents will knock glowing orbs out of them for players to collect, with a bar at the top of the screen indicating what percentage of the orbs in play each character possesses; the size and value of these orbs vary depending on the strength of the attack used. Players who collect a majority of the orbs will enter "burst mode", dramatically increasing their speed and attack power. To win a fight, a player must either collect all of the orbs in play, leaving their opponents with none, or possess the highest percentage of orbs when time runs out. As such, a fight can potentially last indefinitely if no time limit is set. Characters have access to a host of special moves and abilities, with certain characters being able to use temporary transformations to increase their strength. Items will also spawn during battle, which can be used to attack opponents or induce positive and negative status effects.

The single player mode has the player fight through five rounds, some of which have missions with randomly selected goals; the higher the difficulty chosen by the player, the more missions are given out. Fulfilling these missions' goals rewards the player with coins that can be used in a slot machine upon defeating the boss character, allowing players to potentially unlock characters, stages, and other bonuses.

Up to four players can participate in a multi-player session, though a multitap must be used for more than two players for the PS2 version.

=== Playable characters ===
The game features a total of 20 playable characters, 12 of which are available from the start.

Dragon Ball Z	One Piece	Naruto
Buu (Note: Unlockable character); Cell; Frieza; Goku; Gohan; Piccolo; Trunks; Vegeta	Chopper; Luffy; Nami; Sanji; Usopp; Zoro	Gaara; Kakashi; Lee; Naruto; Sakura; Sasuke

== Reception ==
Both versions of Battle Stadium D.O.N received a rating of 26 out of 40 from Weekly Famitsu. Siliconera praised the game's presentation and accessibility, but criticized the game's lack of depth and tedium of unlocking characters.
