= AnimeTrax =

Anime soundtrack distribution label

- Parent company: A.D. Vision; The Right Stuf International
- Founded: 2001
- Genre: Anime soundtrack
- Country of origin: United States

AnimeTrax (also styled ANIMEtrax) was a joint venture between A.D. Vision and The Right Stuf International to distribute anime soundtracks (often called OSTs) in the United States. In early 2003, ADV and Right Stuf dissolved their joint partnership. ADV departed to form its own music division, ADV Music, while Right Stuf assumed full ownership of the AnimeTrax label, operating it thereafter as AnimeTrax LLC.

AnimeTrax's catalog included soundtracks from Slayers, Martian Successor Nadesico, Lost Universe, Samurai X (Rurouni Kenshin: Tsuiokuhen), Boogiepop Phantom, Macross II, Macross Plus, Akira and The Irresponsible Captain Tylor.

== See also ==
- List of record labels
