= Point Blank DS =

2006 video game for the Nintendo DS

- North American cover art.
- Developer: Namco Bandai Games
- Publishers: JP/NA: Namco Bandai Games; (Note: Released under the Namco brand in Japan.): EU: Atari Europe
- Producer: Nobutaka Nakajima
- Series: Point Blank; Unō no Tatsujin
- Platform: Nintendo DS
- Release: JP: May 18, 2006; NA: June 13, 2006; EU: December 8, 2006
- Genres: Lightgun shooter, minigame compilation
- Modes: Single-player, multiplayer

Point Blank DS (Note: Known in Japan as Unō no Tatsujin: GunBullet Trainer (右脳の達人 ガンバれっトレーナー, Unō no Tatsujin: Ganbarettorēnā; Right-Brain Master: GunBullet Trainer)) is a 2006 lightgun shooter video game developed and published for the Nintendo DS by Namco Bandai Games. It is the fourth entry in the Point Blank series, comprising both new stages and ones taken from the first three games. Players use the touch screen to complete a number of different minigames that vary in terms of mechanics, such as protecting an on-screen character or shooting down a specific target.

== Development and release ==
Point Blank DS was produced by Nobutaka Nakajima, known for working on projects relating to older Namco video games, including Namco Museum Battle Collection and Pac 'N Roll, alongside the Xbox Live Arcade digital versions of Pac-Man, Galaga and Dig Dug. Development took around ten months to complete, featuring a team of 25 people. Nakajima was interested in the Nintendo DS' hardware capabilities and touch screen controls, thinking that the Point Blank series could be adapted for play on the handheld. Converting the series' gameplay to the DS proved to be an issue from the start, however the team overcame it later on. Nakajima noted that should the game sell well, similar "touch shooting" video games could be produced for the DS. In Japan, the game was part of Namco Bandai's Unō no Tatsujin series, which featured quick thinking-based puzzles with cameos by other Namco game characters. Point Blank DS was released in Japan on May 18, 2006, followed by a North American and European release on June 13. The game was published in Europe by Atari Europe.

== Reception ==
Reception

Aggregate score
| Aggregator | Score |
|---|---|
| Metacritic | 66/100 |

Review scores
| Publication | Score |
|---|---|
| GameSpot | 7/10 |
| GamesRadar+ | 3.5/5 |
| IGN | 7/10 |

Point Blank DS received mixed reviews from critics, with common complaints being towards the game's lack of replay value and for minigames being too similar to each other. It holds a 66/100 on aggregator website Metacritic.

GamePro expressed disappointment towards the game's lack of depth, saying how it only provides a few hours of play even with the amount of content. A similar response was echoed by GamesRadar+, who also criticized the long loading times present in the multiplayer mode. IGN thought the game was shallow in some areas, notably with its low amount of content, and disliked the multiplayer mode's long loading times, while GameSpot criticized many of the minigames for being too similar to each other and for the game not having enough variety. GameSpot also labeled the redemption game remakes as "incredibly dull" and disliked its lack of unlockable extras.
