= Super Dimensional Fortress Macross II: Lovers Again =

1992 Japanese OVA series

- The VHS cover for Macross II original North American release.

超時空要塞マクロスII -LOVERS AGAIN-
- Genre: Mecha; Military Science Fiction; Romance
- Created by: Takashi Watabe; Kazumi Fujita
- Original video animation
- Directed by: Kenichi Yatagai
- Written by: Sukehiro Tomita
- Music by: Shirō Sagisu
- Studio: AIC
- Licensed by: Big West (licensing) Disney Platform Distribution (worldwide streaming license); NA: U.S. Renditions (former) Manga Entertainment (former) AnimEigo (home video)
- Released: May 21, 1992 – November 21, 1992
- Episodes: 6
- Manga
- Written by: Sukehiro Tomita
- Illustrated by: Tsuguo Okazaki
- Published by: Shogakukan
- English publisher: NA: Viz Media
- Magazine: Shōnen Sunday Zōkan
- Published: 1993
- Volumes: 1
- Anime film

Macross the Movie: Lovers Again (Compilation film)
- Written by: Quint Lancaster; Raymond Garcia
- Music by: Shiro Sagisu
- Licensed by: L.A. Hero
- Released: June 4, 1993
- Runtime: 150 minutes
- Manga

The Micron Conspiracy (Original English-language manga)
- Written by: James D. Hudnall
- Illustrated by: Schulhoff Tam
- Published by: Viz Media
- Published: 1994

Super Dimensional Fortress Macross II: Lovers Again (超時空要塞マクロスII -LOVERS AGAIN-) is a six episode OVA in the Macross franchise. It was the first installment of Macross to feature a new cast of characters. Macross II was produced by Big West, with no involvement from the original series creators from Studio Nue or the original series animators from Tatsunoko and Artland.

== Background ==
After Flash Back 2012, Studio Nue no longer wanted to work on Macross as a series. Big West continued alone, building from Do You Remember Love? with Macross II and three video games: Macross 2036 and Macross: Eien no Love Song for the PC Engine CD and Macross: Scrambled Valkyrie for the Super Famicom.

In light of this, Studio Nue decided to continue the story themselves, though they used the original television series as a base instead. This began with the 1994 Macross Plus and no further work is based on what is now considered a "Parallel World" timeline.

== Plot ==
The story takes place in 2092, 80 years after the events depicted in Macross: Do You Remember Love? The SDF-1 Macross still exists, as does the U.N. Spacy Minmay Attack stratagem, which has been successfully employed to thwart the Zentradi threat ever since. However, a new humanoid alien race called the Marduk, arrives in the Solar System with enslaved Zentradi and Meltlandi warriors who are seemingly unaffected by the Minmay Attack. The Marduk employ their own female singers, called Emulators, who incite their giant warriors with songs.

The story focuses on reporter Hibiki Kanzaki, who is caught in the middle of the action when he rescues an Emulator, Ishtar, while covering a battle between the U.N. Spacy and the Marduk. Hibiki proceeds to teach her about Earth's culture, which she then shares with the rest of the Marduk. However, the Marduk leader, Emperor Ingues, considers Earth's culture anathema. With the help of ace fighter pilot Silvie Gena, Hibiki and Ishtar attempt to end the war.

== Characters ==
Hibiki Kanzaki (神崎 ヒビキ, Kanzaki Hibiki)
Voiced by: Tsutomu Takayama (Japanese); Jonathan Fahn (English)
The series' main protagonist, Hibiki is an entertainment reporter for the television network Scramble News Network (SNN). Desiring to advance his career, he jumps at the chance to cover the first encounters with the Marduk. While covering one of the battles, he discovers Ishtar, an Emulator used to excite the Marduk forces' aggressive tendencies through her singing. Originally seeing the scoop of a lifetime, Hibiki harbors Ishtar on Earth and shows her Earth's culture but is eventually moved by Ishtar's belief in bringing peace to her people by spreading Earth's love songs. Hibiki also finds himself having to deal with the U.N. Spacy, which is overzealous in not allowing any possibility of public panics despite having the frontline pushed all the way back to Earth itself.
Ishtar (イシュタル, Ishutaru)
Voiced by: Hiroko Kasahara (Japanese); Debra Rogers (English)
An Emulator within the Marduk race. Her singing enhances the aggressive tendencies of the Marduk's Zentraedi and Meltrandi warriors and allows the Marduk to control them. When Hibiki brings her to Earth, she is shocked by human culture and traditions. Because of her experiences, she changes her Emulator song to be one which encourages the Marduk to be peaceful. She believes the SDF-1 Macross is the legendary ship of the Alus, an entity prophesied in Marduk culture to bring peace to their civilization.
Silvie Gena (シルビー·ジーナ, Shirubī Jīna)
Voiced by: Yumi Tōma (Japanese); Susan Byrkett (English)
Sylvie is an ace Valkyrie II variable fighter pilot and commander of the Faerie Squadron. She has a Meltrandi grandmother, from whom she inherited her prowess at fighting (reportedly second only to Nexx Gilbert), and becomes very angry at the Marduk when she discovers that the aliens brainwash their Zentradi and Meltrandi soldiers. Hibiki's pursuit of a scoop of her secret meeting with Supreme Commander Exxegran makes her punch the reporter in the nose. Her feelings for him change over the rest of the series.
Nexx Gilbert (ネックス·ギルバート, Nekkusu Girubāto)
Voiced by: Bin Shimada (Japanese); Steve Blum (English)
One of the UN Spacy's elite pilots, Nexx appears to be a bit narcissistic because of fighter pilots being highly popular in Earth society. Although he doesn't seem to go very far with Sylvie beyond a few dates, he is genuinely in love with her. He pilots a combat-worthy prototype of the VA-1SS Metal Siren variable fighter during the U.N. Spacy's fleet engagement against Marduk near the Moon and takes command of one of the two Macross Cannons committed to resist the final Marduk assault on Earth.
Wendy Ryder (ウェンディー·ライダー, Wendī Raidā)
Voiced by: Yukiyo Satō (Japanese); Trish Ledoux (English)
An idol singer who is used in the U.N. Spacy propaganda releases. She is known for singing "Invitation with the Valkyrie" (バルキリーで誘って, "Barukirī de Sasotte") and "Friends Now" (今は友達, "Ima wa Tomodachi") during the annual U.N. Spacy Moon Festival.
Dennis Lone (デニス·ローン, Denisu Rōn)
Voiced by: Ryūzaburō Ōtomo
An SNN cameraman and war correspondent, Dennis believes in presenting both sides of a story even if it means getting it from deep behind enemy lines. He thinks Hibiki doesn't understand what journalism is really all about but nevertheless sees potential in him. He dies during Hibiki's first assignment with him inside a Marduk warship; his death has a significant impact on how Hibiki looks at the world of journalism.
Mash (マッシュ, Masshu)
Voiced by: Takeshi Kusao
A transsexual owner of a beauty salon, Mash is one of Hibiki's close friends. Their bond is good enough such that he is the one Hibiki turns to when the latter decides to harbor Ishtar after rescuing her on an assignment.
Exxegran Giri (エックセグラン・ジリ, Ekkuseguran Giri)
Voiced by: Yoshisada Sakaguchi (Japanese); Hal Cleaveland (English)
One of the U.N. Spacy's senior commanders, Exxegran has a noble spirit and is equally aware of how complacent the organization has become. He appears quite personable as Sylvie and her Faerie teammates look up to him as a father figure.
Feff (フェフ, Fefu)
Voiced by: Tōru Furuya (Japanese); Steven Blum (English)
Feff is a commander in the Marduk forces. Despite his battlefield prowess, he does not entirely believe in Ingues's extreme enforcement of cultural purity and eventually turns on him once he understands what Ishtar is trying to do. Feff later confesses that he harbors feelings for Ishtar.
Lord Emperor Ingues (イングス, Ingusu)
Voiced by: Ryōtarō Okiayu (Japanese); Bill Kestin (English)
The Marduk Empire's supreme ruler, Ingues is cruel, despotic, and obsessed with eliminating any foreign culture. He even purges troops within the fleet that have been exposed to other cultures.
Commander Balser (バルゼー, Baruzē)
Voiced by: Takeshi Watabe
Commander of the U.N. Spacy's 12th Fleet, Balser leads from the fleet flagship Gloria during a valiant but ultimately futile defense against the Marduk invasion near the Moon. The Gloria is destroyed when the sheer number of Marduk warships overwhelms the defenders.

=== The Faerie Squadron ===
The Faerie Squadron is a trio of Valkyrie pilots under Silvie's command. In the final episode, all three of them later join Nexx Gilbert in manning a Macross Cannon ship.

Saori (沙織)
Voiced by: Aya Hara (Japanese); Lisa Gratton (English)
She is interested in Nexx Gilbert and is always looking for a way to get closer to him.
Amy
Voiced by: Mariko Kōda (Japanese); Melissa Charles (English)
Nastasha (ナスターシャ, Nasutāsha)
Voiced by: Yumi Hikita

== Production ==
Macross II began production in 1991 and debuted simultaneously in the United States and Japan, during the second quarter of 1992, in order to commemorate the 10th anniversary of the original The Super Dimension Fortress Macross television series. Out of the original Macross staff, only three of them returned for Macross II: Haruhiko Mikimoto (character designer), Sukehiro Tomita (scripter) and Yasunori Honda (sound director). Shoji Kawamori, the creator of the original Macross series, did not participate in this project because, at the time, he had no interest in writing sequels. Since co-creator Studio Nue was also absent from this project, studios AIC and ONIRO handled the production.

Macross II was framed as six episodes because, at the time, it was felt that short OVA series were the current trend in anime. Initially conceived as taking place 300 years in the future, that number was pared down to 80 years during production. Macross II also takes place in the same universe as the PC Engine Super CD-ROM² games Macross 2036 and Macross: Eternal Love Song. The staff was not allowed to use any of the original Macross characters in this project. Furthermore, the staff decided to avoid the "idol" singer concept that was propounded in the original series. Their rationale was that Japan was experiencing an "idol boom" during the 1980s and Macross mirrored that. Haruhiko Mikimoto explained that he and director Kenichi Yatagai differed on what they envisioned Macross II to be; compromises had to be made on both sides. The mechanical designs for Macross II were created by Junichi Akutsu, Jun Okuda and Koichi Ohata (who previously worked on Gunbuster).

== Media ==
Macross II is a six-episode OVA that was released in Japan from May 21, 1992, to November 21, 1992, on VHS volumes, on June 25, 2001, on DVD and on July 25, 2014, on Blu-ray. It was also broadcast on TV Tokyo from July 26, 1993, to August 30, 1993.

=== North American releases ===
U.S. Renditions released Macross II in 1992 and 1993, dubbed into English, on three VHS cassettes each containing two episodes. L.A. Hero released the series in 1993 as a movie in a limited number of theaters across the US as a 150-minute film on 35 mm film.

Manga Entertainment consolidated the six episodes in 1995 into a single VHS cassette called Macross II: The Movie. It was released as two VHS cassette variations: the first contained the English dub and the second contained the original Japanese dialogue with English subtitles.

In 2000, Macross II: The Movie was released on DVD by Manga Entertainment. This DVD included both the English dub and the original Japanese dialogue with English subtitles. Bonus materials included a music video (actually a creditless closing theme), four character profiles and an image and mechanical designs gallery.

Macross II: The Movie was released as a downloadable video rental on the Xbox Live Marketplace for the Xbox 360 by Starz. This release only included the English dub and it was in standard definition. Manga Entertainment released Macross II in 2008 as a downloadable video purchase on the iTunes Store in its original six-episode format with each episode available individually. The episodes only include the English dub and they are in standard definition.

On May 2, 2011, a new version of the English dub movie was uploaded by Manga Entertainment to their YouTube channel. This version only contains episodes 1 through 4.

In June 2023, AnimEigo announced it would launch a Kickstarter campaign to release Macross II on Blu-ray. AnimEigo founder Robert Woodhead said that the release would be an HD transfer and not an upscale. The campaign was successful, surpassing its initial $75,000 goal within the first 24 hours.

==== Episode list ====
No.	Title	Original release date	English release date
1	"Contact" "Kontakuto" (コンタクト)	May 21, 1992	October 28, 1992
Scramble News Network (SNN) entertainment reporter Hibiki Kanzaki exposes Sylvie Gena and Exxegran Giri at a secret meeting inside a hotel, earning his breaking story huge ratings. He is reprimanded by veteran reporter and cameraman Dennis Lone for only being interested in ratings, and his bureau chief orders him to apologize to the two or he'll lose his job. Sylvie catches Hibiki as he's leaving the SNN building and wants to talk with him. As they are talking at the Culture Park, the SDF-1 Macross gives off a huge energy burst, and then Sylvie is recalled due to a large number of unidentified ships defolding near Jupiter. He is assigned to fly a civilian Valkyrie and bring the drunk Dennis to cover the story. They get to the battle area and begin filming the "Minmay Defense", a holographic projection of a singing idol star. The song causes the attacking alien ships to stop, but a mysterious song broadcast by the enemy causes them to attack again - and this time, they're gaining the upper hand. Hibiki is in disbelief that the U.N. Spacy could lose and that so many people are dying all around him. Lone tells him to pull himself together and get inside one of the enemy capital ships. When they get inside the Marduk ship, they see a mysterious scantily clothed woman and Lone picks her up, but he's killed in the process. He tells Hibiki to get the story out before he dies. Hibiki takes the woman and the footage back to Earth.
2	"Ishtar" "Ishutaru" (イシュタル)	June 21, 1992	October 28, 1992
Marduk officer Lord Feff follows Hibiki and the woman back to Earth. Hibiki doesn't tell anyone other than his friend Mash about the woman. As he's filming the sleeping woman for his story, she awakes and becomes afraid, wondering where she is. After being fitted with a translator, she is able to understand Hibiki, who calms her down enough to learn her name - Ishtar. She learns there are Zentran and Meltran (males and females) living together on the planet with the humans. While they are talking, the Macross emits another energy discharge, and Ishtar says that it's the light of something called the ship of the Alus. Hibiki turns on the news to see that the military is glossing over the actual events of the battle. Having slipped out of Mash's apartment, Ishtar is overwhelmed by the variety of music and individuality on the Earth and walks around the city while trying to find the ship of the Alus. Hibiki finds her in a park. Meanwhile, Feff's soldiers are also looking for her, and some of them have been shot down. The military leadership is discussing their options. Mash gives Ishtar a makeover, and Hibiki takes her to the Culture Park to teach her about Earth's cultures just as Feff's troops locate her. Sylvie and Saori, plus a flight of UN Spacy atmospheric-use Valkyries, rescue them, but Ishtar runs away and finally sees the ship of the Alus - which turns out to be the Macross. When Feff appears to demand that Ishtar come back to the fleet with him, she refuses and he leaves, confused about why she would abandon her position as Emulator.
3	"Festival" "Fesutibaru" (フェスティバル)	August 21, 1992	December 9, 1992
The media continues to cover up the Marduk threat and uses the opportunity to promote the annual Moon Festival, which piques Ishtar's interest. Hibiki asks her again who she is, and she says she needs to go to the SDF-1 before she can tell him. Sylvie follows them after finishing a date with Nexx Gilbert. They arrive at the SDF-1 and go up to the bridge where Ishtar partially activates the ship simply by touching some of the control panels. She confesses her real identity to Hibiki, and explains that they use the Zentradi to destroy any foreign cultures, with the Emulators keeping them in line. Ishtar adds that the Macross is the legendary "ship of the Alus" which will bring peace to the Marduk. Upon overhearing everything, Sylvie arrives and wants to take Ishtar into custody as she's the enemy, but Hibiki convinces her otherwise. They all go to the Moon Festival, where the new Metal Siren Valkyrie is rolled out and pop singer Wendy Ryder performs a love song that mesmerizes Ishtar. Silvie and Ryder fly off in the new fighter - and run into a Marduk ambush; the enemy is planning to capture the singer they think is the "enemy Emulator". Hibiki and an insistent Ishtar launches in an SNN Valkyrie. Ishtar decides to give herself up to Lord Feff if he lets Silvie and Ryder go. Sylvie goes after them and arrives at Feff's ship just before they jump.
4	"Marduk Disorder" "Marudūku Disuōda" (マルドゥーク·ディスオーダ)	September 24, 1992	December 9, 1992
The Marduk interrogate Hibiki about his job and Ishtar's strange behavior. Sylvie rescues Hibiki just before he is brainwashed. As they are escaping, Hibiki keeps recording parts of the ship and discovers that the Marduk are using mind control to keep the Zentradi soldiers fighting for them. Meanwhile, Ishtar is sent to another ship for examination by senior Emulator Lady Elensh about the extent of her exposure to Earth's culture. She resists the treatment, explaining about the ship of the Alus and why they shouldn't destroy the people on Earth. She sings a new song that stops all the Zentradi troops in their tracks; Marduk Emperor Ingues fields a special ship to destroy the "contaminated" warship. Lord Feff arrives and takes Ishtar away just before the affected ship is destroyed, but not before chasing Sylvie and Hibiki, who have been trying to find Ishtar all along. A U.N. Spacy escort carrier later rescues Hibiki and Sylvie.
5	"Station Break" "Sutēshon Bureiku" (ステーション·ブレイク)	October 22, 1992	February 10, 1993
Commander Exxegran debriefs Silvie about the events of the previous episode. Hibiki, meanwhile, hijacks the emergency military channel to broadcast information the military has been suppressing and is arrested. The supreme U.N. Spacy council questions Hibiki about the footage he shot inside the Marduk ship and also orders Sylvie's arrest. Out in space, Ingues orders the entire Marduk fleet to begin the attack on Earth, and are successful in breaking the defenses with Zentradi forces leading the charge and the Emulators' songs encouraging them. However, Ishtar refuses to sing along with them. Ishtar brushes off Feff's appeals to follow Ingues' command; Feff sends her away to Earth. One of the UN Spacy's fleet commanders, Balser, is confident he can defeat them with four Macross Cannons (special transformable heavy artillery warships patterned after the SDF-1) under his charge. However, as he fires the Macross Cannons, another Marduk strike force broadsides the U.N. Spacy fleet. Balser sends his command ship into the middle of the action, shooting up several Marduk ships before it is destroyed. The Zentradi/Meltrandi troops step up their ferocity and begin kamikaze attacks on the U.N. Spacy ships when Ingues orders the Emulators to sing their special "death song." Some of the ships in Ishtar's group are later destroyed on his orders for refusing to sing it as well - and he networks the Zentradi troops coming from Ishtar's force with Emulators in other loyalist ships to keep up the assault. Sylvie tells Exxegran of her plan to launch a sneak on Ingues' mothership using the SDF-1 Macross. Hibiki records a message explaining that he thinks humans aren't learning from previous mistakes.
6	"Sing Along" "Shingu Arongu" (シング·アロング)	November 21, 1992	February 10, 1993
With the Marduk fleet having blasted through the U.N. Spacy's orbital and space defenses, Macross City's civilian populace is shepherded into underground shelters while the U.N. Spacy's ground forces mobilize for a last stand. Sylvie springs Hibiki and takes him to the SDF-1 Macross. Sylvie discovers that it is still operational and she launches it. They fire the Macross' legendary beam cannons on the Marduk mothership, but it has little effect; a subsequent blast by the mothership destroys the Macross, but the bridge section separates in time. The Marduk attack destroys everything in their path. Hibiki and Sylvie finally realize their feelings for each other and kiss as Ishtar comes into the room. She tells them that this is the true power of the Alus. Sylvie doesn't believe there is anything else that can be done, but Ishtar broadcasts to the Marduk an appeal to spare humanity. This causes the fighting to stop and leaves some Emulators unsure about Ingues' plan, causing him to start destroying those who question him. Ishtar sings a love song and the remaining Emulators join her as well, prompting the remaining Marduk warships to open fire against Ingues. Feff is incensed by Ingues' denials about the legendary Alus and joins the barrage (along with the U.N Spacy's last two Macross Cannons), destroying both him and his ship. The Marduk and the humans sign an eternal peace treaty and Ishtar leaves with Feff to spread the new culture among the remaining Marduk.

=== Soundtracks ===
The music score was composed by Shiro Sagisu, who subsequently became famous for his works on Neon Genesis Evangelion. J-pop singer Mika Kaneko composed and performed the series opening and ending theme songs while Hiroko Kasahara performed Ishtar's songs and Yukiyo Satō did Wendy Ryder's songs. Some of these songs were reused as background music in the 1995 series Macross 7.

The U.S. release of the soundtrack is as follows:

- JVC (1993) Macross II Original Soundtrack Volume 1 is released in North America on CD. This compact disc contained the background music and vocal songs from, approximately, the first half of the series.
- AnimeTrax (2001) Volume 1 is re-released as the Macross II Original Soundtrack on CD. This version retains the cover art from its Japanese counterpart and does not include the liner notes found in the JVC release.

Volume 2 was only released in Japan (along with Volume 1) by JVC's parent company, Victor Company of Japan, as The Super Dimension Fortress Macross II Original Soundtrack Vol. 2 in 1992. This compact disc contained the background music and vocal songs from, approximately, the second half of the series.

== Merchandising ==
=== Manga ===
Viz Comics published a ten-issue monthly comic book limited series called Super Dimensional Fortress Macross II that was circulated, monthly, from September 1992 through June 1993. This limited series was originally published as a manga in Shōnen Sunday Zōkan by Shogakukan in Japan and was released as a volume in March 1993. While a traditional manga will typically deviate from its anime counterpart, the Macross II manga was a direct adaption of the Macross II anime. The manga series was scripted by Sukehiro Tomita and illustrated by Tsuguo Okazaki. The English version was translated by James D. Hudnall and Rachel Thorn.

In 1994, Viz Comics reissued the ten individual issues in a single trade paperback volume. Unlike the previous Viz series, which was released in the same size as Silver Age comic books, this compilation was published in the same size as conventional manga and was spiral-bound. In November 1994, Viz Comics published Macross II: The Micron Conspiracy as a five-issue comic book limited series. Marketed as a "100% made-in-America sequel", the story is set one year after the events of Macross II and follows Hibiki Kanzaki and Sylvie Gena as they attempt to uncover the explanation behind a series of mysterious attacks against the Zentradi on Earth. This series was written by James D. Hudnall with illustrations provided by Schulhoff Tam.

=== Posters ===
Four official Macross II posters were released by U.S. Renditions, L.A. Hero and Viz Comics. The first two posters featured the cover art from "Marduk Disorder" and "Sing Along." These two posters each measured 25 by 39 inches (640 mm × 990 mm). The third poster released was the 27 by 41 1/8 inches (690 mm × 1,040 mm) official theatrical poster for the Macross II 35 mm film release, featuring the cover art from "Station Break." The fourth poster, released by Viz Comics, featured Ishtar and measured 28 5/8 by 40 1/2 inches (730 mm × 1,030 mm).

=== Role-playing game ===
In 1993, Palladium Books released a role-playing game called Macross II: The Role-Playing Game. This was followed that same year by Macross II: Sourcebook One—The U.N. Spacy, which was an extension of the first game. In 1994, Palladium joined forces with Canadian role-playing game company Dream Pod 9 to produce a three-part Deck Plans supplement series, which featured technical schematics of U.N. Spacy and Marduk warships and new rules for ship-to-ship combat.

=== Model kits ===
Bandai released a 1:100 scale model kit of the VF-2SS Valkyrie II. The model was capable of transforming into Fighter, Gerwalk and Battroid modes, but required the swapping of hip joints for each mode. The kit also included additional sprues for assembling the Super Armed Pack. Several companies have made garage kits of the VF-2JA Icarus, as well as additional parts to convert the Bandai Valkyrie II into an atmospheric mode fighter without the Super Armed Pack. Evolution Toys announced the release of a 1:60 VF-2ss Silvie Gina version for Fall 2015.

=== Video games ===
Banpresto released an arcade video game adaptation developed by NMK titled Super Dimension Fortress Macross II in 1993.

Characters, mecha and story elements from this OVA are featured in the PlayStation Portable video game Macross Ultimate Frontier, the sequel to Macross Ace Frontier (2008). Ultimate Frontier was released in Japan in October 2009.

== Reception ==
In 1992, Macross II was described as "the most eagerly anticipated anime sequel ever." Volumes 1 and 2 of Macross II went on to become the #1 selling anime videos in the United States in September 1992 and January 1993 respectively. Despite its bestseller status, Macross II failed to develop an affinity with many fans of the original Macross series. Criticisms from Mecha Anime HQ concerned Macross II's decision to feature a journalist as the series protagonist instead of a military pilot, and that the storyline adhered too closely to its predecessor. Anime News Network described the plot as "unoriginal" and noted that it seemed as if too much material was squeezed into Macross II.
