= Manabu Namiki =

Japanese video game composer

- 並木 学
- Born: September 13, 1971 (age 54); Funabashi, Japan
- Other name: Santaruru
- Occupation: Composer
- Years active: 1989–present
- Employers: Allumer (1990–1991); NMK (1992–1995); Raizing (1995–2000); M2 (2012–2017)
- Musical career
- Genres: Electronica; chiptune; techno; rock; video game music
- Instruments: Piano, keyboards

Manabu Namiki (並木 学, Namiki Manabu; born September 13, 1971) is a Japanese video game composer who is primarily known for his work in shoot 'em up games. He has worked at game companies such as Allumer, NMK, Raizing and M2. In October 2002, Namiki, Hitoshi Sakimoto, and Masaharu Iwata founded the music production company Basiscape, whom he worked with until 2011.

== Early life ==
Namiki became interested in arcade games during his childhood. He never received any musical education, nor learned to play any instruments. He became enthusiastic about music from video games, as well as hard rock and heavy metal bands such as Whitesnake and Metallica. After buying an MSX2, he learnt how to program music in BASIC and attempted to imitate the riffs of the bands he enjoyed. He also joined a video game music cover band in 1989 along with his classmate Jin Watanabe, who also went on to become a video game composer.

== Allumer, NMK and Raizing (1990–2000) ==
In 1990, he joined Allumer as a part-time graphic designer while at college, despite having very little design experience. He assisted with graphics for its 1991 shoot 'em up game Rezon. His enthusiasm for the job decreased, and was fired as a result of not finishing sound programming work his boss had assigned to him. He applied to join Westone, where his former classmate and fellow composer Watanabe worked, but was rejected. The following year, he left college and joined NMK as a full-time sound creator. He worked on several titles such as Thunder Dragon 2 and Bomb Jack Twin, as well as Zed Blade, which features hardcore techno music as a response to the trend of techno music in video games. His final work at the company was Desert War; by the time the game was released in 1995, he had already left NMK to join Raizing.

One of the first games he composed for at Raizing was Battle Garegga, often considered to be his breakthrough work. The soundtrack takes heavy inspiration from Detroit techno music, the soundtrack of Recca, and the music of Hitoshi Sakimoto and Shinji Hosoe. As the system featured outdated sound hardware, he aspired to make the most of its abilities. The Sega Saturn version of Battle Garegga features an arranged soundtrack, with arrangements from himself, Sakimoto, Hosoe, and other friends. He also contributed music to the original arcade versions of the fighting game Bloody Roar and its sequel. His work at Raizing was not limited to music and sound; he directed the light gun shooter game Ghoul Panic and created the sound data, but outsourced the music to other composers.

== Freelance work and Basiscape (2000–2012) ==
Namiki was offered the opportunity to work as a planner at Raizing instead of sound; as he ultimately wanted to continue pursuing his composing career, he left the company in early 2000 and became freelance. He struggled to find employment, while some game projects he had taken on were cancelled. His first project as a freelancer was DokixDoki Sasette!, where he composed all of the music and created the sound driver. He took influence from Western chiptune music for the game's soundtrack. This was followed by Cave's shoot 'em up games DoDonPachi DaiOuJou and Ketsui: Kizuna Jigoku Tachi, released in 2002 and 2003 respectively. He found the projects challenging; the music in both games had to be composed in the MOD format using 8 channels. In October 2002, he co-founded the music production company Basiscape with Sakimoto and Masaharu Iwata, both of whom he had previously worked with on projects at Raizing, although he worked as a contractor in a freelance capacity and not as a full-time employee.

One of his first major projects at Basiscape was Mushihimesama, which features lighter music than previous shoot 'em up games he had composed for, taking influences from a wide range of genres; Iwata also contributed several tracks to the game, which he feels widened the variety of music in the game. During his time working with Basiscape, he also contributed music to several games related to anime franchises, such as Fullmetal Alchemist: Dream Carnival, the Bleach: Heat the Soul series, and Battle Stadium D.O.N, as well as role-playing games such as Fantasy Earth Zero, Odin Sphere, and Opoona. He also served as the sole composer of the action role-playing game Black Rock Shooter: The Game in 2011.

Namiki's work with Cave continued throughout his time at Basiscape. Although he was initially asked to compose the music for Espgaluda, he could not fit the job into his schedule, although he composed for its sequel, Espgaluda II, which similarly features trance music. He composed for Deathsmiles in 2007, which features gothic rock music; it features guitar performances by Noriyuki Kamikura, a composer who worked at Basiscape at the time. He also composed for DoDonPachi Resurrection with then-new Basiscape members Azusa Chiba and Yoshimi Kudo, as well as its Black Label version in 2010 alongside Chiba, Kudo and Kamikura. He found it difficult to communicate with his juniors due to the large generational gap and having different musical influences.

== M2 and later freelance work (2012–present) ==
In 2012, he joined M2 as a sound director, whom he had already closely worked with for a decade. One of his first projects at the company was composing the soundtrack for G.rev's shoot 'em up game Kokuga; its sound has been described as more melodic and less atmospheric than his previous shoot 'em up scores. While employed at M2, Namiki also worked on several titles in the Sega 3D Reprint Archives series; 3D OutRun notably features two new tracks composed by him and M2 colleague Jane-Evelyn Nisperos respectively.

Namiki left M2 in 2017, but continues to maintain a close relationship with the company. He designed and composed music for the Game Gear shoot 'em up GG Aleste 3, which released in 2020 as part of Aleste Collection. He has also worked with exA-Arcadia, providing arranged music for titles such as Gimmick! Exact Mix and P-47 Aces Mk.II.

== Personal life ==
Namiki is a single father. In May 2024, Namiki was hospitalized due to a chest pain, resulting in him being diagnosed with a myocardial infarction. He was subsequently infected with COVID-19. He also struggles with mental health. As a result of his ongoing issues, his work output has slowed down to a halt.

== Notable works ==
Year	Title	Notes	Ref.
1992	Blandia	Music with Hisao Shiomi and Akira Inoue	
1992	Super Spacefortress Macross	Location test version; music with Kazunori Hideya and H. Mizushima	
1993	Bomb Jack Twin	Music	
1994	Zed Blade	Music	
1995	P-47 Aces	Music with Kazunori Hideya and Akira Hirokami	
1996	Battle Garegga	Arcade version; music	
1996	Terra Diver	Sound effects	
1997	Bloody Roar	Arcade version; Music	
1998	Battle Garegga	Saturn version; arrangements with various others	
1998	Armed Police Batrider	Music with Kenichi Koyano and Hitoshi Sakimoto	
1998	Bloody Roar 2	Arcade version; music with Masaharu Iwata, Kenichi Koyano, and Jin Watanabe	
1999	Ghoul Panic	Arcade version; direction, sound data creation	
2000	Dimahoo	Sound data creation, arrangements	
2000	Ghoul Panic	PlayStation version; music	
2002	DoDonPachi DaiOuJou	Arcade version; music	
2003	Ketsui: Kizuna Jigoku Tachi	Music	
2003	DoDonPachi DaiOuJou	Console version; arrangement ("Stage 5")	
2004	Battle B-Daman	Manipulation with Hitoshi Sakimoto	
2004	Fullmetal Alchemist: Dream Carnival	Music (two tracks)	
2004	Mushihimesama	Music with Masaharu Iwata	
2005	Bleach: Heat the Soul	Music with Mitsuhiro Kaneda	
2005	Espgaluda II	Music with Mitsuhiro Kaneda	
2006	Metal Slug 6	Music with Mitsuhiro Kaneda	
2006	Fantasy Earth Zero	Music ("Other Building Theme")	
2006	Eyeshield 21: Devilbats Devildays	Music with Atsuhiro Motoyama, Mitsuhiro Kaneda, and Masaharu Iwata	
2006	Battle Stadium D.O.N	Music with Basiscape	
2006	Mushihimesama Futari	Music with Kimihiro Abe	
2006	Digimon World Data Squad	Music (one track)	
2007	Konami Classics Series: Arcade Hits	Music	
2007	Odin Sphere	Music ("Battle in Ringford - Second Movement")	
2007	Beatmania IIDX 13 Distorted CS	Music ("Shoot 'Em All")	
2007	Namco Museum DS	Music	
2007	Deathsmiles	Music	
2007	Opoona	Music with Basiscape	
2007	Doraemon Wii	Music (two tracks)	
2008	DoDonPachi Resurrection	Music with Azusa Chiba and Yoshimi Kudo	
2008	Fate/unlimited codes	Music with Basiscape	
2008	Trauma Center: Under the Knife 2	Music with Noriyuki Kamikura	
2008	Gradius ReBirth	Arrangements	
2008	Fantasy Zone II: The Tears of Opa-Opa	System 16 version; music	
2009	Contra ReBirth	Arrangements	
2009	Deathsmiles II	Music with Noriyuki Kamikura and Yoshimi Kudo	
2009	Castlevania: The Adventure ReBirth	Arrangements	
2010	Z.H.P. Unlosing Ranger VS Darkdeath Evilman	Music with Basiscape	
2010	Busou Shinki: Battle Masters	Music with Noriyuki Kamikura, Yoshimi Kudo, and Naoyuki Sato	
2011	Otomedius Excellent	Music with various others	
2011	Half-Minute Hero: The Second Coming	Music ("Intro of THE VENUS 7" and "Battle of THE VENUS 7")	
2011	Black Rock Shooter: The Game	Music	
2011	Busou Shinki: Battle Masters Mk. 2	Music ("Introduction")	
2012	DoDonPachi SaiDaiOuJou	Music	
2012	Kokuga	Music; sound effects with Jane-Evelyn Nisperos	
2013	Caladrius	Music with Yoshimi Kudo	
2014	3D OutRun	Music ("Cruising Line")	
2014	Super Smash Bros. for Nintendo 3DS and Wii U	Arrangements ("Duck Hunt Medley" and "Wrecking Crew Medley")	
2015	Yakuza 0	Sound effects with various others	
2016	Yakuza 6: The Song of Life	Sound effects with various others	
2020	GG Aleste 3	Direction; music	
2020	Gimmick! Exact Mix	Arrangements	
