= Arkista's Ring =

1990 video game

- Cover art
- Developer: NMK
- Publisher: American Sammy
- Composer: Shizlla Okamura
- Platform: NES
- Release: NA: June 1990
- Genre: Action-adventure
- Mode: Single-player

Arkista's Ring is an action-adventure game developed by NMK and published by American Sammy for the Nintendo Entertainment System in 1990. The game is set in a fantasy world where the player controls a female elf named Christine, in her quest to find the titular magic item.

== Plot ==
The Elven ring of Arkista has been stolen by the villainous Shogun, who has cast the entire Elven Kingdom into darkness. The only hope for the Elves is that their strongest warrior, Christine, equipped with only her trusty bow and arrows, can travel throughout the Kingdom and retrieve the ring.

== Reception ==
Allgame's Alan Weiss gave it 3 out of 5 stars, calling it "an extremely pleasant action-adventure game" and drawing parallels to The Legend of Zelda.
