= Black Heart (video game) =

1991 video game

- Japanese arcade flyer
- Developer: NMK
- Publisher: UPL
- Platform: Arcade
- Release: JP: May 1991
- Genre: Scrolling shooter
- Modes: Single-player, multiplayer

Black Heart (Note: Japanese: ブラックハート, Hepburn: Burakku Hāto) is a 1991 horizontally scrolling shooter video game developed by NMK and published by UPL for arcades. It was only released in Japan in May 1991. Hamster Corporation released the game outside Japan for the first time as part of their Arcade Archives series for the Nintendo Switch and PlayStation 4 in November 2021.

== Gameplay ==
In Black Heart, the player controls the dragon-mounted character named Zil who is on a quest to rescue pixies who are trapped inside the cages, as well as his beloved damsel in distress named Jeanne from the ruler of the Dark Forces, Taranith. The player can shoot or breathe fire at enemies to defeat enemies, with fire being more powerful than ammunition but limited in quantity; fire can be replenished by collecting pixies. Once defeated, the player can collect coins dropped by the enemies. There are eight levels in total, each ending with a boss fight. If the bosses are defeated, the player proceeds to the next level. Upon completing the final level, the game loops back to the first stage, often increasing the difficulty level. Getting hit by enemy fire or colliding against solid stage obstacles will result in losing a life. If all of the lives are lost during gameplay, the game is over unless players may insert more credits into the arcade machine to continue playing. In addition to single player mode, Black Heart supports two-player simultaneous gameplay feature, where the second player can join in at any time by inserting credits during gameplay.
