= Saboten Bombers =

1992 video game

- Developer: NMK
- Publisher: Tecmo
- Platform: Arcade
- Release: JP: Early April 1992
- Genre: Platform
- Modes: Single-player, multiplayer

Saboten Bombers (Note: Japanese: サボテンボンバーズ, Hepburn: Saboten Bonbāzu) is a 1992 platform video game developed by NMK and published by Tecmo. It was released only in Japan in April 1992. Hamster Corporation released the game as part of their Arcade Archives series for the Nintendo Switch and PlayStation 4 in April 2021.

== Gameplay ==
Saboten Bombers is a single screen platform game in which the main characters are anthropomorphic cacti named Wanpi (1P) and Tsuupi (2P). The gameplay consists of throwing bombs at the enemy pests that infested a house where player cacti reside and avoiding being hit by bombs thrown by enemies, in a similar manner to Taito's Bubble Bobble. However, explosions from players' own bombs pose a threat to players as well as enemies. Because players' bombs tend to move fast and bounce off walls during the game, throwing them carelessly are tantamount to suicide. There are a variety of enemies and colorful backgrounds. Some enemies can withstand more than one bomb attack, and some can escape bombs while still being swept away before explosions - both of which compel players to toss multiple bombs at them. Physical contacts with enemy minions do not kill players, but with bosses do. When all enemies are defeated, a stage is cleared, allowing players to move on to the next stage. The game consists of over 100 levels with every tenth stage featuring bosses, and also a versus mode in which the player competes against the computer-controlled opponent. The game has many collectable items, the most notable of which is the cake which gives the player an extra life after collecting eight pieces.

== Reception ==
In Japan, Game Machine listed Saboten Bombers on their May 15, 1992, issue as being the twelfth most popular table arcade unit at the time.
