= Ninja Crusaders =

1990 video game

- Japanese cover art
- Developer: NMK
- Publisher: Sammy Corporation
- Composer: Kazunori Hideya
- Platform: NES
- Release: JP: December 14, 1990; NA: December 1990
- Genre: 2D action platformer
- Mode: Single-player or multiplayer (up to 2 players)

Ninja Crusaders (Note: Released in Japan as Ninja Crusaders Ryuga (Japanese: 忍者クルセイダーズ 龍牙, Hepburn: Ninja Kuruseidāzu Ryūga)) is a side-scrolling action game released by Sammy Corporation for the Nintendo Entertainment System in 1990. The player takes control of one of two ninjas who are tasked at thwarting an alien invasion. The game has been compared to Tecmo's Ninja Gaiden series.

== Gameplay ==
Ninja Crusaders is a side-scrolling action game that can be played by up to two players simultaneously. There are four weapons that player can pick up and use during the game: shuriken, kusarigama, bō and sword. Each weapon has its unique style and transformation ability: shuriken provides the ability of transforming into tiger, which is the fastest and can jump the highest but has the shortest range; kusarigama provides the ability of transforming into sea scorpion, which can swim better than all the rest but moves very slowly on land; bō provides the ability of transforming into falcon, which has the ability to fly above everything but cannot attack at all; and finally sword provides the ability of transforming into dragon, which can fly, is invincible, and kills everything in one hit, but the player can only use this ability only once and only for a limited amount of time, also sword itself rarely appears in the game.

== Plot ==
In the near future, a force of alien invaders is wreaking havoc on Earth from the furthest reaches of outer space. This new menace was stronger than our most powerful defenses and proved to be unstoppable. In Japan, brave ninja warriors rose from the shadows to battle the alien invaders, but were eventually driven out as the menace took control of their homeland. Some of the ninjas escaped Japan and scattered to remote lands around the world. But their passion to reclaim their land and crush the enemy's rage. It was decided that two ninjas, Talon and Blade, would be sent to destroy the evil.

== Reception ==
Reception

Review score
Publication	Score
Electronic Gaming Monthly	6/10, 6/10, 5/10, 6/10

NES Player claims that the speed and unpredictability of the game's enemy character are what leads to the game's biggest downfall, level memorization, forcing players to over-rely on memorization in later stages.
