= Super Dimension Fortress Macross II =

1993 video game

- Developer: NMK
- Publisher: Banpresto
- Platform: Arcade
- Release: JP: June 1993
- Genre: Scrolling shooter
- Modes: Single-player, multiplayer

Super Dimension Fortress Macross II (Note: Japanese: 超時空要塞マクロスII, Hepburn: Chōjikū Yōsai Makurosu II) is a 1993 horizontally scrolling shooter video game developed by NMK and published by Banpresto for arcades. It was released only in Japan in June 1993. It is an adaptation of the 1992 OVA Super Dimensional Fortress Macross II: Lovers Again, and hence is not a sequel to the 1992 video game Super Spacefortress Macross, which is based on the 1982 series Super Dimension Fortress Macross.

Hamster Corporation released the game outside Japan for the first time as part of their Arcade Archives series for the Nintendo Switch and PlayStation 4 in July 2025. It was sold at a marked up price, and unlike Super Spacefortress Macross, it was released outside Japan due to Harmony Gold USA's lack of involvement.

== Gameplay ==
The player controls Silvie Genna or Nexx Gilbert, who aim to defeat the Marzuk while navigating levels in VF-1 Valkyrie mecha fighters and defeating enemies. Two different modes, Fighter and GERWALK are available, but the Battroid form is only used when a bomb clears the entire screen of enemies; the Armored Battroid mode is absent. Power-ups can be acquired to increase firepower; they grant extra points if the player is already maxed out.
