= Legend of Makai =

1988 video game

- North American arcade flyer
- Developer: NMK
- Publisher: Jaleco
- Platform: Arcade
- Release: JP: July 1988; NA: November 1988
- Genres: Platform, action-adventure
- Modes: Single-player, multiplayer

Legend of Makai (Note: Japanese: 魔魁伝説, Hepburn: Makai Densetsu) is a 1988 platform video game developed by NMK and published by Jaleco for arcades. It was released in Japan in July 1988 and North America in November 1988. Hamster Corporation released the game as part of their Arcade Archives series for the Nintendo Switch and PlayStation 4 in March 2021.

== Gameplay ==
Gameplay screenshot

Legend of Makai is an action-adventure platformer based in a fantasy setting. The player controls a young warrior whose quest is to rescue a princess from an evil wizard. The warrior starts off with only a sword, but can purchase other weapons and magical items from shops. The gameplay consists finding one's way through non-linear levels, using keys to open doors and killing or avoiding various enemies. The player has a fixed amount of time to complete each level.

== Reception ==
In Japan, Game Machine listed Legend of Makai as the 21st most successful table arcade unit of August 1988. Legend of Makai was favorably reviewed by Power Play's Martin Gaksch, who praised the game's mix of action and adventure but criticized the graphics.
