= P-47 Aces =

1995 video game

- Developers: NMK exA-Arcadia (Mark II)
- Publishers: Jaleco exA-Arcadia (Mark II)
- Composers: Akira Hirokami (Uncredited); Kazunori Hideya (Uncredited); Manabu Namiki (Uncredited); Sizlla Okamura (Uncredited)
- Series: P-47
- Platform: Arcade
- Release: JP: March 1995; NA: 1995; WW: September 29, 2022
- Genre: Horizontally scrolling shooter
- Modes: Single-player; multiplayer
- Arcade system: Mega System 32, exA-Arcadia

P-47 Aces (Note: Japanese: P-47 エースズ, Hepburn: P-47 Ēsuzu) is a 1995 horizontally scrolling shooter arcade video game developed by NMK and published by Jaleco. It is the sequel to P-47: The Phantom Fighter, which was released earlier in 1988 on multiple platforms. Taking place after the events of the first P-47, players assume the role from one of the four fighter pilots conforming an elite squadron sent by the United World Armies taking control of airplanes to make a dent against the enemy on battle. Its gameplay involves destroying waves of enemies, picking up power-ups and new weapons, and destroying bosses. It ran on the Mega System 32 hardware. An upgraded version titled P-47 Aces Mark II was released on exA-Arcadia in arcades on September 29, 2022.

== Gameplay ==
Gameplay screenshot.

P-47 Aces is a horizontal-scrolling shooter game similar to its predecessor, P-47: The Phantom Fighter, where players assume the role of one of the four pilots from an elite squadron sent by the United World Armies taking control of their respective airplanes with their own unique abilities through eight increasingly difficult levels that take place across multiple countries around the world, each with a boss at the end that must be defeated to progress, in an effort to make a dent against the enemy.

Certain enemies carry icon-based power-up items that can be picked to increase the aircraft's firepower such as bombs and missiles. Getting hit by enemy fire or colliding against solid stage obstacles will result in losing a live, as well as a penalty of decreasing the aircraft's firepower and once all lives are lost, the game is over unless players insert more credits into the arcade machine to continue playing. A new addition to the sequel is the hyper system, which increases the plane's overall power to its maximum status after continuing. In addition to the single-player mode, the game also features a two-player cooperative multiplayer mode.

== Development and release ==
P-47 Aces' soundtrack was scored by then-NMK members Akira Hirokami, Kazunori "HIDE-KAZ" Hideya, Manabu Namiki and Sizlla Okamura. In a 2011 interview, Namiki stated Hideya was the game's main composer and that he wrote three songs in MIDI but did not perform a data conversion. Namiki also stated he liked the track for the night desert stage and planned to release the original version in the future. The title was released in Japanese arcades by Jaleco in March 1995 for the Mega System 32 board. The game was also showcased in North America by Jaleco during the 1995 ACME show. On April 27, 2011, an album containing music from the title and its predecessor titled JALECO Retro Game Music Collection was co-published in Japan by Sony Music Entertainment Japan and Team Entertainment. Another album titled SUPER Rom Cassette Disc In JALECO was also released by City Connection under their Clarice Disk label on September 25, 2013, featuring music from the game and its prequel.

P-47 Aces received a location test version prior to its 1995 launch in Tokyo and is notable for featuring one of the earliest instances of a hyper system in a shoot 'em up game prior to DoDonPachi DaiOuJou (2002). In this version, the hyper system was built by collecting additional power-up items and when activated, players are rendered invincible to enemy attacks, deliver damage to enemies by bumping against them and the plane's firepower is increased exponentially. However, the hyper system was replaced in the final version by a more standard bomb mechanic, which did not exist in the location test version.

=== Mark II ===
exA-Arcadia developed and released a director's cut titled P-47 Aces Mark II outside of Japan and P-47 Aces Kai for Japan on September 29, 2022. It is considered the 3rd title in the EXA Label series. Mark II features 3 play modes: Original, Wide and Mark II. Original is an enhanced port of the Mega System 32 version removing the slowdown issues seen in the original. Wide is a rebalancing of the Mega System 32 version and expands the playfield from 4:3 to 16:9 widescreen. Mark II is a director's cut mode adding 4 new pilots, the hyper system seen in the original location test and completing stages & enemies that were not in the original version. Two of the new pilots come from the Jaleco shmup, Plus Alpha. Stages 2 and 4 have new added sections. In all modes, an extra difficulty level called Kiwami or Extreme is available and both the original and arranged soundtrack are selectable. Former NMK sound members, Manabu Namiki and Sizlla Okamura, composed a new arranged soundtrack for this release. The key visual illustration was drawn by Macross illustrator, Hidetaka Tenjin.

== Reception ==
In Japan, Game Machine listed P-47 Aces on their May 15, 1995 issue as being the sixth most popular arcade game at the time.
