= Thunder Dragon 2 =

1993 video game

- Developer: NMK
- Publishers: JP: NMK; NA: Sammy
- Platform: Arcade
- Release: JP/NA: October 1993
- Genre: Scrolling shooter
- Modes: Single-player, multiplayer

Thunder Dragon 2 (Note: Japanese: 雷龍2, Hepburn: Sandā Doragon 2) is a 1993 vertically scrolling shooter video game developed and published by NMK for arcades. It was released in Japan in October 1993 and in North America by Sammy the same month. It is the sequel to Thunder Dragon (1991). Hamster Corporation acquired the rights to the game alongside NMK's portfolio, releasing the game as part of their Arcade Archives series for the Nintendo Switch and PlayStation 4 in February 2022.

== Gameplay ==
The player controls two planes, a propeller plane and a jet fighter, as they navigate landscapes and defeat enemies. The two planes differ in ammunition and speed, the former of which can be enhanced by power-ups. Both planes can be played simultaneously by two players. Various collectible items float around the player, granting extra points which increase after being shot.

== Reception ==
Martin Robinson of Eurogamer called the game one of the best on the Nintendo Switch, calling it "limited but gorgeous".
