= Point Blank (video game series) =

Video game series

- Developers: Namco; Tose; Bandai Namco Studios
- Publishers: Namco; Sony Computer Entertainment; Bandai Namco Entertainment
- Platforms: Arcade, PlayStation, PlayStation 2, Nintendo DS, iOS, Android
- First release: Point Blank; 1994
- Latest release: Point Blank X 2016

Point Blank, known as Gun Bullet (ガンバレット, Gan Baretto), or Gunvari (ガンバリ, Ganbari) in Japan, is a series of light gun shooter games developed by Namco for the arcade, PlayStation and Nintendo DS; the trilogy was first released in arcade in 1994 and was later ported onto the PlayStation. Point Blank DS was released in 2006 for the Nintendo DS featuring 40 challenges from the original series.

== Gameplay ==
Players use two attached light guns (in the case of the DS, a pen or in the case of the iOS version, touching the screen) to hit targets onscreen; missions require speed, quick judgment or pinpoint accuracy. The game consists of non-violent shooting contests where players are tasked with challenges such as shooting player-colored bulls-eyes, cardboard criminals, and other inanimate objects, not shooting bombs and cardboard cutouts of civilians (much like in Namco's first light-gun game, Steel Gunners), and protecting characters Dr. Don and Dr. Dan, among other miscellaneous challenges, similar to games like Police Trainer, and Area 51: Site 4 - and players choose the desired difficulty level (Practice, Beginner, Advanced, and Very Hard in the first game, or Training, Beginner, Advanced, and Insane in the second game onwards) which will determine how many stages must be finished to complete the game, as well as their overall difficulty. Players are shown four missions in each grouping, and may attempt them in any order; they usually have only three lives for the entire game, but this may depend on the cabinet settings. Most stages have unlimited bullets, but some have a limited amount of ammo. Players lose lives if they fail to fulfill the stage quota, or shoot Do Not Shoot targets, such as Bombs, Civilians or the opponent's colour targets.

There are six different types of stages in the game: Accuracy, where both players must shoot the designated areas with the highest points, Intelligence, where they must count to sixteen (by shooting the numbers), Memory, where they must match two cards by shooting two matching cards, Simulation, where they are required to shoot the cardboard robbers but not civilians (in the Japanese theme of this type, they must shoot cardboard ninjas, but not geishas), Visual Acuity, where they are required to shoot the target which matches what is displayed, and Speed, where they are required to shoot targets of their designated colors (depending players play from left or right); in the arcade version, both light guns must also be calibrated before the crosshairs on the screen shall move.

Upon completing all stages, players will have their performance ranked. Point Blank 1 & 2's ranking is based on how many points have been accumulated, lives remaining, and how many continues have been used, and will advise the player to advance up to a higher difficulty, try out head to head with a friend, return to a lower difficulty, or to practice more. Point Blank 3 and DS ranks numerous aspects of a player's performance such as concentration, accuracy, judgement etc., and then presents them with an overall letter grade.

== Games ==
- Point Blank/Gun Bullet (ガンバレット, Gan Baretto) (1994) (Arcade, PlayStation) – The original.
- Point Blank 2/Gunbarl (ガンバァール, Ganbāru) (1999) (Arcade, PlayStation) – Released half a decade after its precursor.
- Ghoul Panic/Oh! Bakyūn (オーバキューン, Ōbakyūn) (1999) (Arcade, PlayStation) – A spin-off title that features a haunted house theme (similar to the original Golly! Ghost!) and 3D graphics (as those seen in the Namco System 21, 22 and 11 arcade system boards).
- Point Blank 3/Gunbalina (ガンバリーナ, Ganbarīna) (2000) (Arcade, PlayStation) – Its Japanese name is a pun on Thumbelina.
- Gunvari Collection + Time Crisis (2002) (PlayStation 2) – This title is a Japan-only compilation of the first three Point Blank games and the first Time Crisis (1995), which was the seventh title from Namco to use a light gun.
- Aim For Cash (2004) (Arcade) – A gambling (skill based, not luck) version of Point Blank 3 where the player tries to clear games for the prize money. Should they fail in the Final Game, the player can try again for the same price as to play (i.e., increasing the bet).
- Point Blank DS/Unō no Tatsujin: Gun Bullet Trainer (右脳の達人: ガンバレットトレーナー, Unō no Tatsujin Ganbaretto Torēnā) (2006) (Nintendo DS) – A new installment that includes stages from all three of the Point Blank arcade games which uses the console's stylus and touch screen instead of the arcade's light guns.
- Point Blank Adventures (2015) (iOS, Android) – A new free-to-play title in the series, built from the ground up exclusively for mobile; it features over 200 stages and Facebook integration. Like its immediate precursor, the touch screen is used instead of a light gun.
- Gun Bullet X/Point Blank X (2016) (Arcade) – The fourth major arcade release in the series after Point Blank 3, a reboot of the series. The game is an arcade-exclusive version that was released worldwide in late 2016. This iteration features a redesigned cabinet that uses a flat-screen monitor, a departure from the older arcade releases; it features current graphics and new stages, including HD-remastered stages from Point Blank 1-3, a GunCon controller similar to the one used in Time Crisis 4 with old colors, and the capability to dispense tickets.

== Release ==
Point Blank was originally developed as an arcade game in 1994, but a console version was made for the PlayStation in 1997; this version included an "arrange" mode which added an alternate version of Arcade mode, as well as adding many new gameplay modes alongside an RPG mode. It also supports the GunCon controller. The game was re-created in 1999 as Point Blank 2, adding more mini-stages and replacing "Very Hard" difficulty with "Insane" - and the game was once again re-worked in 2001 as Point Blank 3, being only released for the arcades in Japan and for the PlayStation worldwide, and featured cameos from other Namco properties, such as Rick Taylor from Splatterhouse, Klonoa, Mappy, and Pooka and Fygar from Dig Dug.

== Reception ==
PlayStation reviews

Review scores
Publication	Score
Electronic Gaming Monthly	9.375/10
GameSpot	7.8/10
Next Generation	3/5
Extreme Playstation	89/100
Play	83%

In Japan, it was the seventh highest-grossing dedicated arcade game of 1995. According to Electronic Gaming Monthly, Point Blank was a "cult favorite" in U.S. arcades.

The PlayStation version was the third best-selling video game in Japan for the week ending August 10, 1997.

Reviews for the PlayStation version were positive, with critics especially praising the great variety of the stages. Dan Hsu and John Ricciardi of Electronic Gaming Monthly (EGM) both wrote that it was the best light gun game they had ever played, and they and their two co-reviewers lauded the gameplay's engagement, longevity, and additional PlayStation content, especially the quest mode. Point Blank tied with the PlayStation version of Resident Evil 2 for EGM's "Game of the Month". Next Generation was less impressed with the quest mode, commenting that "It's nice to know that Namco wants to add value to the overall package, but it seems a bit forced, and players will tire of it well before they're finished." They instead considered the competitive two-player mode the highlight, and concluded that "Overall, Point Blank is in no way perfect for a single player, but people looking for a two-player gun game will not be disappointed." GameSpot summed up, "Namco's managed to capture and apply the addictive elements of puzzle and shooting games, creating a title that is so enjoyable and difficult to put down you won't be bothered by the audiovisual shortcomings." GamePro said the endless variety keeps the player from getting bored, resulting in "a lighthearted shooter that will entertain you for a surprisingly long time." They gave it a perfect 5.0 out of 5 for control and 4.0 in each of the remaining categories (graphics, sound, and funfactor).

In 1997, Electronic Gaming Monthly listed Point Blank as the 7th best arcade game of all time. Official U.S. PlayStation Magazine referred to characters Dr. Dan and Dr. Don as "an underrated dynamic duo" in September 2004.
