= Thunder Dragon =

1991 video game

- Developer: NMK
- Publisher: Tecmo
- Platform: Arcade
- Release: NA: August 1991; JP: September 1991
- Genre: Scrolling shooter
- Modes: Single-player, multiplayer

Thunder Dragon (Note: Japanese: 雷龍, Hepburn: Sandā Doragon) is a 1991 vertically scrolling shooter video game developed by NMK and published by Tecmo for arcades. It was released in North America in August 1991 and Japan in September 1991. Hamster Corporation acquired the game's rights through their purchase of NMK's intellectual property, releasing the game as part of their Arcade Archives series for the Nintendo Switch and PlayStation 4 in March 2021. A sequel, Thunder Dragon 2, was released in October 1993.

== Gameplay ==
The player controls the titular attack helicopter who attempts to thwart the schemes of mad scientists by defeating their creations. The helicopter can utilize a mix of four types of ammunition as well as bombs to defeat enemies while avoiding attacks. Various collectible items float around the player, granting extra points which increase after being shot. The game ends after completing 8 levels and defeating their boss enemies.
