= Mighty Bomb Jack =

1986 video game

- North American NES box art
- Developer: Tecmo
- Publisher: Tecmo: JP: Nintendo (arcade)
- Director: Hideo Yoshizawa
- Composers: Tsukasa Masuko; Michiharu Hasuya
- Platforms: Arcade, NES, Amiga, Atari ST, Commodore 64
- Release: NES: JP: April 24, 1986; NA: July 1987; PAL: 1992; Arcade (VS. Mighty Bomb Jack): JP: 1986
- Genre: Platform
- Modes: Single-player, multiplayer
- Arcade system: Nintendo VS. System

Mighty Bomb Jack (Note: Japanese: マイティボンジャック, Hepburn: Maiti Bon Jakku) is a 1986 platform video game developed and published by Tecmo for the Nintendo Entertainment System. It was later ported to the Amiga, Atari ST and Commodore 64. Mighty Bomb Jack is a sequel to Tecmo's 1984 arcade game Bomb Jack.

== Plot ==
Jack, the protagonist of the game, must make his way through 16 levels set within a pyramid in order to defeat the demon Belzebut and rescue the royal Pamera family.

== Gameplay ==
An action zone (NES version). The blue character in the center is Jack, the player character.

Each level is split into two parts; an action zone and a Royal Palace room. The mechanics and level designs of the Royal Palace rooms are directly lifted from Bomb Jack. Action zones can be split up into several portions and contain power-ups usually hidden in treasure chests such as money bags, Mighty Coins and Mighty Drinks. Mighty Coins allow Jack to change colors; blue allows Jack to open orange treasure chests, orange allows him to open any treasure chest by simply touching it from the side, and green transforms all enemies on the screen into coins for 5 seconds. Mighty Drinks add 10 seconds to the game's timer. Secret passages can also be found in the action zones, activated by finding a Sphinx in a visible or hidden treasure chest.

To prevent the player from becoming too "greedy", the game automatically sends the player to a Torture Room if they obtain more than 9 Mighty Coins or 99 seconds on the game's timer. The only way to escape a Torture Room without losing a life is to complete a number of jumps, which are counted down on the screen. Once the player exits the Torture Room, Jack automatically loses all Mighty Coins, the timer is reset to 60 seconds, and the game recommences from the beginning of the current level.

== Development ==
The game was directed by Hideo Yoshizawa. It was his debut title as a game director.

Within PAL-A regions, the NES version was only released in Australia. The NES version was released on the Virtual Console on May 7, 2007 for the Wii, on December 6, 2012 for the Nintendo 3DS and on January 23, 2014 for the Wii U. It was released on the Nintendo Classics service in November 2018. There was also a board game adaptation released by Bandai in 1986. An arcade version for the Nintendo VS. System was released by Nintendo in Japan.

=== VS. System version ===
A Nintendo VS. System version of the game was released in 1986 for the Japanese market (not to be confused with the original dedicated arcade version). Differences between the original and VS. versions include adding a two-player mode, changing the locations of some secret passages and removing a warp in the Royal Palace rooms.

== Reception ==
Reception

Aggregate score
Aggregator	Score			
Aggregator	3DS	NES	Wii	Wii U
GameRankings			47%	

Review scores
Publication	Score			
Publication	3DS	NES	Wii	Wii U
Eurogamer			7/10	
GameSpot			3.8/10	
Nintendo Life	5/10		4/10	6/10
Computer Entertainer		7.5/8		

In Japan, the game sold over 1.5 million copies by 1987. It was Yoshizawa's biggest commercial hit up until its sales was surpassed by Ninja Gaiden.

In North America, the game received a positive review from Computer Entertainer upon release, with a score of 7.5 out of 8 stars, the same as The Legend of Zelda in the same issue. They called Mighty Bomb Jack a fast-paced "adventure-action game" that is "loaded with nuances which you will continue to discover as play" and said it was a tough, frustrating, "just one more time" game that "will have you back for more and more!"

The Virtual Console re-releases later received mixed-to-negative reviews, with GameSpot calling the game "repetitive" and "broken", while Eurogamer called it "[kind of] clever", though "not exactly deep". IGN called the Wii Virtual Console version of Mighty Bomb Jack "a poor candidate for your time investment".

Nintendo Life criticized the game's platforming and level design, stating that "dynamics of [the game] are somewhat broken" and that "the key to success is anticipating how [enemies] will move in order to get past", because their behavior is "almost random". On the other hand, Nintendo Life praised Mighty Bomb Jack's secrets for adding some replay value, as well as the game's sense of humor.
