= Rolan's Curse =

1990 video game

- North American cover art
- Developer: NMK
- Publisher: American Sammy
- Composer: Kazunori Hideya
- Platform: Game Boy
- Release: JP: October 26, 1990; NA: January 1991
- Genre: Action Adventure
- Modes: Single player Multiplayer

Rolan's Curse, known in Japan as Velious Roland no Majuu (ベリウス ローランの魔獣) is an action adventure video game developed by NMK and published by Sammy for the Game Boy in 1990. Sammy released a follow-up to Rolan's Curse for the Game Boy in 1992, entitled Rolan's Curse II.

== Story ==
Once the people of Rolan were terrorized by the evil ruler King Barius before he was imprisoned in a castle deep within the forest. When the king many years later was released he immediately unleashed legions of regenerating monsters on the citizens of the land. Now a hero (or two if you play it in multiplayer) is needed to defeat him and his minions.

== Summary ==
Players have to defeat monsters inside the dangerous forests of the game.

The game is shown in an overhead perspective. Like Nintendo's Zelda adventure series, the player goes from screen to screen and defeats enemies with a sword while finding items from monsters and treasure chests. The player is allowed two items at a time: one weapon and one sub-item; picking up a different weapon or sub will switch out the current one.

In the beginning, the player starts with a sword but can find a fire wand that deals ranged attacks at the sacrifice of attack power. Other items include a hammer for breaking down barriers and a potion for restoring all health. The player can also pick up another of the currently equipped weapon to gain a temporary boost to attack power, or an armor jacket to raise defense temporarily. These temporary boosts return to normal after a level is beaten. More permanent power-ups come in the form of strength gloves and heart containers, which upgrade attack and defense respectively.

This video game can also be played with another player if the two individuals link their Game Boys together while the game is inserted.

=== Controls ===
Rolan's Curse uses the Game Boy's directional pad for cardinal movement, while the "B" and "A" buttons are used to activate the first and second item slots respectively. The "START" button calls up the stats menu where the player can see how strong they are; as well as the password required to continue the game upon power-off. The crystal bracelet can be charged by holding down the "A" button and releasing for a similar attack to the wand's. The "SELECT" button is unused.

=== Graphics ===
The game's visuals are built with graphic tiles, extending the play field beyond the current view. When the player walks to the edge of the screen, the view adjusts to next set of tiles that represent a new area.

Because of the sprite limitations of the hardware, Rolan's Curse's artists opted for a Japanese super deformed (SD) approach to the style.

=== Enemies ===
There are 19 different kinds of enemies in the game; not including bosses. They include zombies, skeletons, knights, wizards, bats, and spiders.

=== Save system ===
The Rolan's Curse cartridge has no internal save battery. The game relies on a password system that can be viewed from the menu and executed when the player picks "CONTINUE" from the title screen. The game updates the current password every time a new item is in inventory, a new upgrade has been found, and when the next level's map is reached.

== Reception ==
Nintendo Power gave Rolan's Curse a 78/100 score.
