= Ghoul Panic =

1999 video game

- Japanese promotional sales flyer
- Developer: Raizing
- Publisher: Namco: EU: Sony Computer Entertainment
- Director: Manabu Namiki
- Producer: Shinsuke Yamakawa
- Composers: Masahiro Fukuzawa; Jin Watanabe; Manabu Namiki (Note: Additional music for the PlayStation version)
- Platforms: Arcade, PlayStation
- Release: Arcade: JP: July 1999; NA: 1999; PlayStation: JP: April 20, 2000; EU: October 2000
- Genre: Light gun shooter
- Modes: Single-player, multiplayer
- Arcade system: Namco System 12

Ghoul Panic (Note: Known in Japan as Oh! Bakyuuun (オー!バキューン, Ō! Bakyūn)) is a 1999 light gun shooter video game developed by Raizing and published by Namco for arcades. A version for the PlayStation was released in 2000. Players used lightguns to complete a series of minigames, done by firing at on-screen targets. In these minigames there is an objective that must be fulfilled before the time runs out to progress such as shooting a certain amount of enemies or protecting small, yellow cats from projectiles. It ran on the Namco System 12 arcade hardware.

The game was directed by Raizing composer Manabu Namiki and produced by Raizing artist Shinsuke Yamakawa, whose previous works include Battle Garegga and 1944: The Loop Master, with music composed by Masahiro Fukuzawa and Jin Watanabe. It is heavily inspired by Namco's Point Blank series of games, with a focus on thrill and adventure. Yamakawa recalls the game being in development when Raizing's development staff had dramatically increased in number. Ghoul Panic was liked by critics for its gameplay, graphics and multiplayer features, although its lack of additions to the traditional gameplay of lightgun shooters was the subject of criticism.

== Gameplay ==
In this minigame, the player must shoot a certain number of ghosts before the timer runs out.

Ghoul Panic is a light gun shooting video game, often compared to the Point Blank series which also runs on the same arcade hardware. Players use lightguns attached to the arcade cabinet to fire at enemies in a series of minigames. These minigames feature a quota that must be fulfilled before the time limit ends, such as shooting a certain number of enemies or protecting small, yellow cats from projectiles. Completing minigames will allow the player to progress, while losing will cause the player to lose a life; losing all lives will result in a Game Over. A life will also be lost if the player shoots the yellow cats or "bomb ghosts". The game is divided into three different stages, each featuring eight minigames to play that become gradually harder as it progresses. Finishing all the minigames in a stage will have the player face off against a boss, including: Frankie, a Frankenstein's monster that will toss projectiles at the player; Vladie, a vampire that launches a barrage of deadly bats; Witchina, a witch that attacks with her spell-casting broomstick; and Mama Mia, a massive dragon-like monster that hurls fireballs.

== Development and release ==
Ghoul Panic, titled Oh! Bakyuuun in Japan, was released for arcades in July 1999 in Japan and later that year in North America. It was developed by Eighting/Raizing, and published by Namco. The game was produced by Raizing artist Shinsuke Yamakawa, whose works include Battle Garegga and 1944: The Loop Master, who recalls the game being developed at a time where Eighting/Raizing's staff had grown considerably. The game was directed by Manabu Namiki, who primarily worked as a composer at Raizing. As Namiki was busy working on designing the game, the music and sound effects were created by former Namco composer Masahiro Fukuzawa and former Westone composer Jin Watanabe. However, he created the waveform data and also composed additional music for the PlayStation version.

It is heavily based on Namco's Point Blank series, with a focus on adventure and thrill. A home conversion for the PlayStation was released in Japan on April 20, 2000, and in Europe later that year. This version was published by Sony Computer Entertainment and is compatible with the GunCon peripheral. To promote its release, Namco held an online contest on the game's official website where players could submit their high-scores in return for prizes.

== Reception ==
Reception

Review scores
Publication	Score
Famitsu	29/40
Superjuegos	93/100
Consoles +	65%
Gamers' Republic	B

Ghoul Panic was met with a mostly mixed response from critics. The lack of major additions to the established formula of the light gun shooter genre was the primary source of criticism, with Consoles+ saying that it doesn't add much to the genre compared to games like Time Crisis. In a preview for the PlayStation version, IGN had a similar response, saying that Ghoul Panic does not add many new additions to the light gun shooter concept. The additional gamemodes added to the PlayStation home conversion were also seen as being mediocre by some. Famitsu said the RPG Mode was not well-designed, feeling heavily rushed and difficult to control. By contrast, Gamers' Republic said that Ghoul Panic made for one of the best light gun shooters on the PlayStation, concluding that it was "bags of fun".

Critics agreed that the gameplay of Ghoul Panic was fun and well-made, with several comparing it favorably to Namco's own Point Blank series. Both Famitsu and IGN stated that while it wasn't as refined as Point Blank, Ghoul Panic featured well-designed gameplay and was fun to play. Famitsu also compared the game's comical horror theme to Golly! Ghost!. Superjuegos said that the accurate aiming of the GunCon and its replay value made Ghoul Panic an excellent light gun game for the PlayStation, and one of that fans of Point Blank should try out. In a 2009 retrospective review, Retro Gamer magazine compared Ghoul Panic favorably to Point Blank and The House of the Dead, saying that while it wasn't as refined as Point Blank or Time Crisis was a great light gun shooter with fun gameplay and unique level designs. The multiplayer modes were also the subject of praise. Retro Gamer listed the multiplayer as one of the game's strong points for adding replay value and for being well-designed and fun to play. Superjuegos also applauded the multiplayer for its replay value and addictive nature.
