= Rolan's Curse II =

1992 video game

- US box art
- Developer(s): NMK Co. Ltd.
- Publisher(s): Sammy Studios (JP); American Sammy (US)
- Platform(s): Game Boy
- Release: JP: February 21, 1992; NA: October 1992
- Genre(s): Action-adventure
- Mode(s): Single-player

Rolan's Curse II, known in Japan as Velious II: Fukushuu no Jashin (ベリオスII 復讐の邪神) is a video game developed by NMK and released for the Game Boy in 1992. It is the sequel to the original Rolan's Curse.

== Plot ==
King Barius is once again trying to take over the world. Ray and three other adventurers set off on a journey to put a stop to his plans for conquest.

== Gameplay ==
The gameplay view is shown in an overhead perspective. The player starts out with one character, Ray, but can later join forces with up to seven more characters. Only three of the seven characters can join the party at once, thus some characters must be left behind. Each character has a unique skill, so choosing which characters are in the party can alter the gameplay experience. Unlike most RPGs, character stats are not raised by defeating enemies, but rather by finding treasure chests that contain powerup points.
