= Gunnail =

1993 video game

- Japanese arcade flyer
- Developer: NMK
- Publisher: NMK
- Platform: Arcade
- Release: JP: January 1993
- Genre: Scrolling shooter
- Modes: Single-player, multiplayer

Gunnail (Note: Japanese: ガンネイル, Hepburn: Ganneiru) is a 1993 vertically scrolling shooter video game developed and published by NMK for arcades. It was released only in Japan in January 1993. Hamster Corporation acquired the rights to the game alongside NMK's portfolio, releasing the game outside Japan for the first time as part of their Arcade Archives series for the Nintendo Switch and PlayStation 4 in January 2022.

== Gameplay ==
The player controls a spaceship and two accompanying small spaceships which navigates various levels and defeats enemies. In addition to bombs, power-ups are available as alternative types of firepower that vary between the main ship and the small ships. Unlike other shoot 'em ups, the accompanying small spaceships do not dissipate when the main ship is hit. Rather, taking hits causes the ship to lose one in four available shields in exchange for improved scoring multipliers and power-ups; the spaceship is at its strongest when all shields are depleted, though it becomes highly vulnerable and will lead to a game over when hit. Items that grant extra points are available after defeating various enemies.
