= Riot (video game) =

1992 video game

- Developer: Tecmo
- Publisher: NMK
- Platform: Arcade
- Release: 1992
- Genre: Shooting gallery
- Modes: Single-player, multiplayer

Riot (Note: Japanese: 雷軋斗, Hepburn: Raijito) is a 1992 shooting gallery video game developed by Tecmo and published by NMK for arcades. While Tecmo had previously released NMK's games in arcades, NMK received a license to develop Bomb Jack Twin and publish Riot in return. It was only released overseas, though Koei Tecmo reacquired the game's rights before 2014. Hamster Corporation released the game as part of their Arcade Archives series for the Nintendo Switch and PlayStation 4 in October 2024.

== Gameplay ==
The game is a shooting gallery game similar to TAD Corporation's 1988 game Cabal. The player must shoot enemies including soldiers, helicopters and mythical creatures in the foreground and background, which the player must frequently switch between while avoiding bullets and explosives. Every level ends when the player reaches the end of the set piece and defeats a boss enemy. The levels become increasingly surreal and nonsensical as the game progresses, resulting in the player having to defeat demons and an evil magician who summons a dragon.
