= Bomb Jack Twin =

1993 video game

- Developer: NMK
- Publisher: NMK
- Composer: Manabu Namiki
- Platform: Arcade
- Release: JP: December 1993
- Genre: Platform
- Modes: Single-player, multiplayer

Bomb Jack Twin (Note: Japanese: ボンジャックツイン, Hepburn: Bon Jakkut Suin) is a 1993 platform video game developed and published by NMK for arcades. It was released only in Japan in December 1993. It is a sequel to Tecmo's Bomb Jack.

Koei Tecmo has since reclaimed the game's copyright due to having licensed the intellectual property to NMK alongside Riot. Hamster Corporation released the game outside Japan for the first time as part of their Arcade Archives series for the Nintendo Switch and PlayStation 4, as well as their Arcade Archives 2 series for the Nintendo Switch 2, PlayStation 5 and Xbox Series X/S in January 2026.

== Gameplay ==
The player controls Bomb Jack and his female companion whose goal is to collect all 24 red bombs on the screen. Enemies can morph into enemies such as flying saucers and orbs that float around the screen once fallen onto the bottom of the screen, making Jack lose a life if he touches them. Bombs will light up in sequence once collected. Collecting bombs will increase the bonus meter at the top of the screen (lit bombs increase it more). Items that turn enemies into coins that provide bonus points are available. Unlike its predecessor, cooperative play is possible.
