= Zed Blade =

1994 video game

- Developer: NMK
- Publisher: SNK
- Programmer: Youichi Koyama
- Artists: Eisaku Origami; Kenji Yokoyama; Hiromi Seki
- Composer: Manabu Namiki
- Platform: Arcade
- Release: JP: September 13, 1994; NA: 1994
- Genre: Scrolling shooter
- Modes: Single-player, multiplayer
- Arcade system: Neo Geo MVS

Zed Blade (Note: Also known as Operation Ragnarok (Japanese: 作戦名ラグナロク, Hepburn: Sakusen-mei Ragnarok) in Japan) is a horizontally scrolling shooter video game developed by NMK and published by SNK for the Neo Geo arcade platform. It is the only game developed by NMK for the Neo Geo. Conversions for both Neo Geo AES (home) and Neo Geo CD were planned and even previewed but neither received an official release to the public.

The game received mixed critical reception, with reviewers mentioning the colorful but generic visuals, unremarkable weapons system, short length, and low difficulty. The music has been called out as a highlight.

Hamster Corporation acquired the game alongside NMK's catalogue, re-releasing the game as part of their ACA Neo Geo series for the PlayStation 4, Xbox One, Nintendo Switch, Windows, Android and iOS.

== Gameplay ==
Gameplay screenshot featuring Roc Carrier, the first boss of the game

Zed Blade is a horizontally scrolling shoot 'em up game similar to Gradius III and Last Resort, where players assume the role from either of the three playable characters (master sergeant Uncle Beard, sergeant Ms. Charlotte and corporal Swift Arnold) with their respective space fighter crafts through eight stages that take place on a futuristic sci-fi setting across the Solar System in a last-ditch effort to stop the invasion against humanity on Earth led by Yggdrasil's on-board supercomputer with his army of enemies and regain full control of the unit once more as the main objective. In addition to the single-player mode, the game also features a two-player cooperative multiplayer mode. If a memory card is present, the player is allowed to save their progress and resume into the last stage the game saved at.

A noteworthy gameplay aspect of the title is that prior to starting, players can arrange the weapon system of their picked ship in the character selection screen, some of which have their speed setting already pre-determined, by choosing between three options for frontal shots, missiles and rear shots, all of which are fired by pressing the A button and controlling the ship is performed with the joystick. In addition to the three main weapons, players are also equipped with set number of bombs depending on the ship chosen at the beginning that are fired by pressing the B button, while its firepower can be increased by collecting a hyper bomb upgrade capable of dealing maximum damage against enemies and bosses, the latter of which are fought at the end of each stage in order to progress further through the game.

Some of the enemies carry power-up items, which appear as colored orbs and alters between the three main weapons after a certain time period passes that can be picked to increase the firepower of either frontal shots, missiles or rear shots. Enemies will also carry extra bomb stocks and hyper bomb upgrades as well. Items will bounce back after reaching the right edge of the screen, however if they are not picked up after this occurs, items will be gone permanently once they have reached the left edge of the screen including 1UP icons, which are spawned after reaching a determined score threshold. Another noteworthy aspect of the title is the scoring system, which allow players to obtain additional points for shooting solid objects from the stages, as well as indestructible parts of large enemies and bosses. Getting hit by enemy fire or colliding against solid stage obstacles will result in losing a live, as well as a penalty of decreasing the ship's weapons to one level and once all lives are lost, the game is over unless the player insert more credits into the arcade machine to continue playing.

== Synopsis ==
Zed Blade takes place in a futuristic sci-fi setting where mankind has managed to expand into the stars and travel to every planet in the Solar System. A large project to establish a space frontier was started with the development of an automated space station named Yggdrasil, which is controlled by a state-of-the-art supercomputer, however the crew of the Yggdrasil began to refuse in responding any of the incoming communications from Earth months after its deployment, with Yggdrasil suddenly launching attacks against Earth through usage of a large fleet of highly developed space fighters, robots and war machines that leads to the enactment of "Operation Ragnarok", where three of the best space fighter pilots from Earth must restore order by seizing control of Yggdrasil and halting the invasion.

== Development and release ==
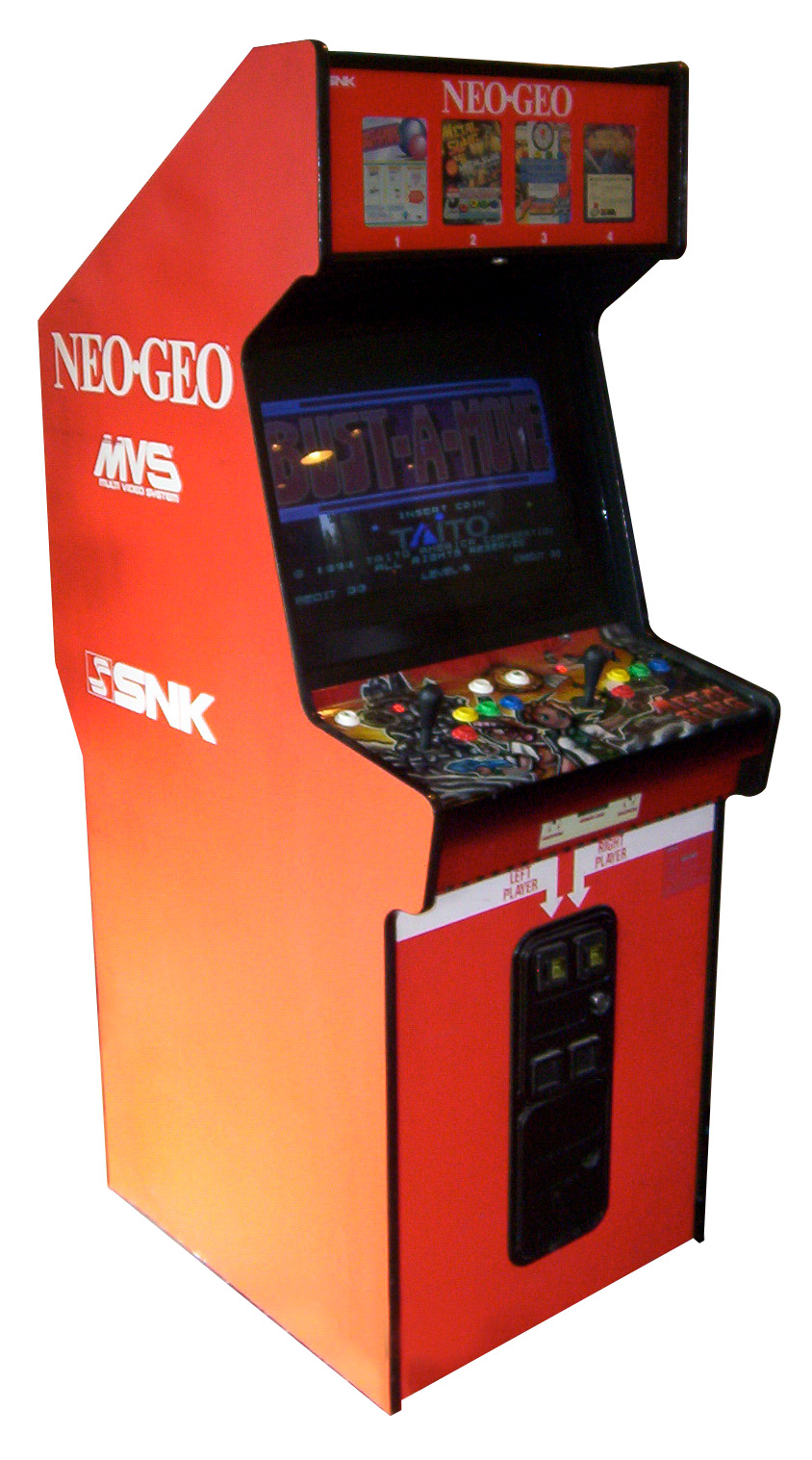
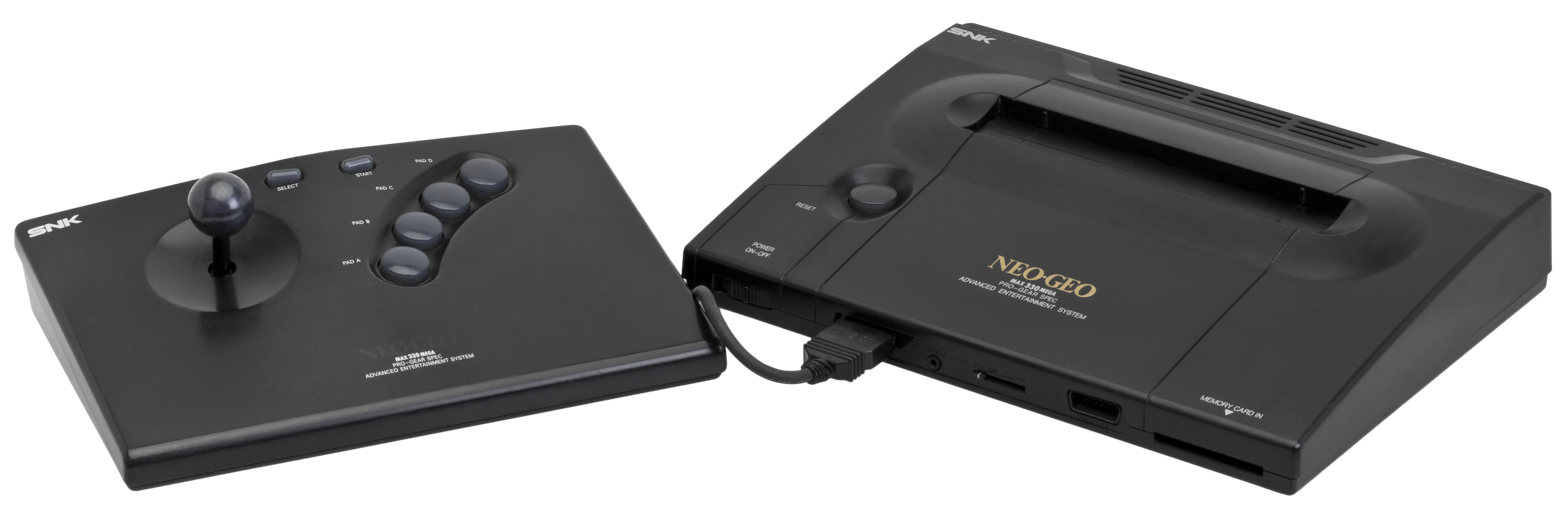
Zed Blade was first developed for the Neo Geo platform.

Zed Blade is the only game created by NMK for Neo Geo and was initially only launched for the arcades by SNK on September 13, 1994. Its soundtrack was done by composer Manabu Namiki. A Neo Geo AES version was announced and completed but never released. A Neo Geo CD version was also announced and even showcased for playing to the attendees at SNK's booth during the Winter Consumer Electronics Show in 1995 but like the AES version, it was never released.

== Reception ==
Reception

Aggregate score
Aggregator	Score
GameRankings	(Switch) 70%

Review scores
Publication	Score
Nintendo Life	(Switch) 7 / 10
AllGame	(Arcade) 2.5/5
Bonus Stage	(Switch) 7 / 10
Electronic Gaming Monthly	(Neo Geo) 25 / 40
GamePro	(Neo Geo) 16.5 / 20
MAN!AC	(Neo Geo) 44%
Video Chums	(Switch) 4/5

In North America, RePlay reported Zed Blade was the fourteenth most-popular arcade game at the time. Zed Blade received mixed reception from critics since its initial release.

Captain Squideo of GamePro praised the frenetic action, cooperative play, controls, weapons system, visuals and sound design.

The four reviewers of Electronic Gaming Monthly felt mixed in regards to the title, with some praising and others criticizing both the visuals and sound design, as well as its short length and low difficulty level.

AllGame's Kyle Knight regarded the game for being unremarkable in terms of its weapons system, although he praised the graphics, music, gameplay and replay value.

In a retrospective review, Dave Frear from Nintendo Life praised the colorful graphics and music but criticized the amount of slowdown when too many objects are present on-screen.

Martin Gaksch of German magazine MAN!AC gave an overall mixed review of the game.
