= Vastar =

1983 video game

- Developer: Orca
- Publisher: Sesame Japan
- Director: Toshiaki Ōta
- Designer: Toshiaki Ōta
- Programmers: Masahiro Yuge; Shinya Kida; Toshiaki Ōta
- Artist: Kenichi Takano
- Composer: Masahiro Yuge
- Platform: Arcade
- Release: JP: December 1983
- Genre: Horizontal-scrolling shooter
- Modes: Single-player, multiplayer

Vastar is a horizontally scrolling shooter released as an arcade video game in 1983 by Orca. The company went bankrupt and could not sell the game under their own brand, so they created the alias Sesame Japan Corporation to release this game.

== Gameplay ==
Near the start of the game

In the year 2956 AD, a fighting robot named Vastar was developed by scientists in order to protect Earth from the Galaxy Empire. The game's is set in a post-apocalyptic Earth. Ruins of the Statue of Liberty, Mount Rushmore and the Moai (stone heads from Easter Island) appear at points in the game.

The player controls Vastar, a fighting flying robot that can shoot enemies with laser beams. Vastar is destroyed by enemy contact or strike but it is provided with a shield that must be activated to prevent attacks. When the shield's energy runs out, Vastar turns itself in an airship that still can shoot laser beams but it's defenseless against strikes. As the player reaches Vastar's base (as well if the player loses a life and restarts with another one), the shield's power is fully charged again and Vastar returns to its default form.
