= Saint Dragon =

1989 video game

- Japanese arcade flyer
- Developer: NMK (Note: Home computer versions developed by Storm Entertainment.)
- Publishers: Jaleco; Home computers Storm Entertainment; PC Engine; Aicom
- Platforms: Arcade, ZX Spectrum, Amiga, Atari ST, PC Engine, Amstrad CPC, Commodore 64, MSX
- Release: February 1989: Arcade; JP: February 1989; NA: March 1989 ZX Spectrum; UK: September 1990 Amiga, Atari ST; EU: October 1990 PC Engine; JP: December 21, 1990 C64, CPC, MSX; EU: 1990
- Genre: Scrolling shooter
- Mode: Single-player

Saint Dragon (Note: Japanese: 天聖龍, Hepburn: Tenseiryū), released in North America as St. Dragon, is a 1989 horizontally scrolling shooter video game developed by NMK and published by Jaleco for arcades. Ports to several home computer systems were published by Storm Entertainment in 1990.

== Gameplay ==
Arcade screenshot

In Saint Dragon, the player controls the cyborg Saint Dragon, who has rebelled against the tyrannical Monster Cyborg army. Saint Dragon is initially armed with plasma bolts and a fiery breath. By collecting tokens, the dragon's firepower can be upgraded with pulse torpedoes, a laser, bouncing bombs, ring lasers or a turret. Other tokens can upgrade the dragon's speed, weapon power, or initiate a "hyper" mode which endows maximum firepower and invulnerability. In addition, the dragon has an armoured tail which follows the player's movement, allowing it to be used as a defensive shield.

There are six levels, each culminating in a battle with a large end-of-level guardian.

== Ports ==
Ports were developed for home computers by Storm Entertainment, a software development team for The Sales Curve (Silkworm, The Ninja Warriors), who were affiliated with Accolade. The conversion project was managed by Dan Marchant, with programming by Andrew Taylor, music by Tony Williams, and graphics by Sean McClure. Before working on the ZX Spectrum conversion, Taylor spent two weeks reading reviews of other scrolling games and studied videos of the arcade board gameplay. During development, Taylor wanted to achieve smooth scrolling, rather than the by-character-block movement in R-Type, without sacrificing speed. A method called "pre-shifts" was eventually used, in which several versions of a sprite are held in memory, each in a slightly different position, then cycled through to give the appearance of smooth movement. This used up more memory, so he restricted the game to the 128K models of Spectrum. The larger sprites, such as the leaping Puma, were handled by dividing them into strips of separate but co-ordinated entities. None of the ports of the game developed by Storm Entertainment include the fifth level of the arcade version.

== Reception ==
Reception

Award
Publication	Award
Crash	Crash Smash

In Japan, Game Machine listed Saint Dragon as the sixth most successful table arcade unit of March 1989.

The ZX Spectrum conversion was well-received on its initial release. CRASH awarded it 92%, finding the dragon theme to be a refreshing change in the genre. The graphics were highlighted as well-animated, smooth and colourful. Your Sinclair awarded 80%, criticizing the uneven difficulty and low number of levels but praising it as "pretty, tough and a blast-a-minute".

On its budget re-release in 1992, Your Sinclair adjusted their rating to just 29%, criticizing it as "hideously slow, graphically abysmal, impossibly tedious load of old junk". Stuart Campbell took issue with the cassette multi-load, the invisible border on the reduced playing area, and frame-rate drop when multiple sprites are on-screen.

== Legacy ==
Hamster Corporation released the game as part of their Arcade Archives series for the Nintendo Switch and PlayStation 4 in February 2020.
