= Hacha Mecha Fighter =

1991 video game

- Arcade flyer
- Developer: NMK
- Publisher: NMK
- Platform: Arcade
- Release: JP: November 1991
- Genre: Scrolling shooter
- Modes: Single-player, multiplayer

Hacha Mecha Fighter (Note: Japanese: はちゃめちゃファイター, Hepburn: Hacha Mecha Faitā) is a 1991 horizontally scrolling shooter video game developed and published by NMK for arcades. It was only released in Japan in November 1991. Hamster Corporation released the game as part of their Arcade Archives series for the Nintendo Switch and PlayStation 4 in June 2021.

== Gameplay ==
Hacha Mecha Fighter is a cute 'em up that features anthropomorphic animals shooting each other while navigating on barely fitting planes. Up to two players can play simultaneously. The first player controls Kawauso, an otter, while the second player controls Tsuchibuta, an aardvark, who alongside numerous offspring of their own must navigate various landscapes and defeat similar enemies. A special attack that increases the player characters' sizes and improve their attacks are available in limited quantities. Their ammunition consists of numerous types of live sea animals and vegetables, which vary in size and damage and can be improved by power-ups. Fruits can be collected for extra points.

== Reception ==
The A.V. Club praised the game for its stylized graphics and unique gameplay, noting it to be an underrated game in the cute 'em up genre while criticizing its difficulty.
