= USAAF Mustang =

1990 video game

- Developer: NMK
- Publishers: UPL; Taito (Mega Drive)
- Platforms: Arcade, Mega Drive
- Release: Arcade: JP: June 1990; Mega Drive: JP: May 31, 1991
- Genre: Scrolling shooter
- Modes: Single-player, multiplayer

USAAF Mustang (Note: Japanese: USAAF ムスタング, Hepburn: USAAF Musutangu) is a horizontally scrolling shooter video game developed by NMK and published by UPL for arcades. It was ported to the Mega Drive by Taito, while being renamed Fire Mustang. Hamster Corporation released the game outside Japan for the first time as part of the Arcade Archives series for the Nintendo Switch and PlayStation 4 in September 2021.

== Gameplay ==
Players took on a fictional campaign in a World War II setting as a USAAF fighter pilot in a titular North American P-51 Mustang against the Nazi Luftwaffe and the Imperial Japanese Navy Air Service, sent around stages in Europe and Asia against either of the two featured Axis powers. Every level was filled with a wide variety of different fighter craft and ground forces that all preceded the end-level boss (generally a large aircraft). Eight levels in all; the game repeats endlessly thereafter.

Players had a typical Vulcan weapon that could be upgraded three times in order for the shot pattern to widen. Players also had an unlimited amount of ground force bombs that would increase in firing speed with the Vulcan. The player's bomb weapon was a weapon called "The Forcer" that fired a large fireball straight forward.

While the arcade original featured a second player to join in, the 2-player addition was removed from the Mega Drive version.

== Reception ==
In Japan, Game Machine listed USAAF Mustang on their August 1, 1990 issue as being the sixteenth most-successful table arcade unit of the month.
