= Butasan =

1987 video game

- Developer: NMK
- Publisher: Jaleco
- Platforms: Arcade, ZX Spectrum, Commodore 64, MSX, Amstrad CPC, X68000
- Release: JP: December 1987
- Genre: Action
- Modes: Single-player, multiplayer

Butasan (Note: Japanese: ぶたさん, Hepburn: Butasan) is an action video game developed by NMK and published in 1987 by Jaleco for arcades. Initially released only in Japan, it was ported to the ZX Spectrum, Commodore 64, MSX, and Amstrad CPC and released internationally by U.S. Gold as Psycho Pigs U.X.B. Hamster Corporation released the game as part of their Arcade Archives series for the PlayStation 4 in 2015 and Nintendo Switch in 2019.

== Gameplay ==
Screenshot

The player controls a pig and the aim of the game is to blow up other pigs by throwing bombs at them. The bombs are randomly spawned across the map and can be picked up and thrown at the other pigs. The bombs are given a number between 5 and 30; when the bomb is thrown it takes that number of seconds to explode. Bombs which directly hit pigs explode on contact. Various power ups are available throughout the game such as gas that makes all other characters fall asleep.

A bonus sub-game involves random pigs popping out of holes, and the player must knock them back down the hole with their own pig, in a similar mode of gameplay to Whack-a-mole.

== Reception ==
Reception

Review scores
Publication	Score
Crash	70%
Sinclair User	59%
Your Sinclair	8/10
ACE	333
The Games Machine	52%

Publicity for the home conversion by U.S. Gold (under the name "Psycho Pigs UXB") received accusations of sexism when an advert showing a semi-naked model holding the game case was published in some computer magazines.
