= Valtric =

1986 video game

- Japanese arcade flyer of Valtric
- Developer: NMK
- Publisher: Jaleco
- Platform: Arcade
- Release: JP: November 1986
- Genre: Vertically scrolling shooter
- Mode: Single-player

Valtric is a vertically scrolling shooter released in arcades in 1986 by Jaleco.

== Gameplay ==
The player controls a hovering land vehicle in eight directions, and is able to shoot in the direction the vehicle faces. Obstacles block the path of the vehicle, and progress through an area is made by the player moving the vehicle upwards, scrolling the screen downwards. Bombs can be dropped directly above the vehicle, similar to Xevious. The player can pick up power-ups that enhance weapons, as well as attach 'options' to the vehicle, drones similar to those of Gradius. The 'options' fire in a direction depending on where they are attached to the main vehicle. The player can avoid danger by jumping.

The game is divided into four different areas, followed by the same four areas in more challenging versions.

Enemies consist of infinitely respawning smaller moving enemies, stationary cannons, and large boss enemies and enemy bases.

== Reception ==
In Japan, Game Machine listed Valtric on their January 15, 1987 issue as being the fifteenth most-successful table arcade unit of the month.
