= NMK (company) =

Japanese video game developer

Nihon Maicom Kaihatsu
- Type: Private
- Industry: Video games
- Founded: May 1985
- Defunct: 1999
- Headquarters: Japan

Nihon Maicom Kaihatsu, better known as NMK, was a Japanese video game developer that created various arcade games and shoot 'em ups. Japanese publisher Hamster Corporation owns the rights to its intellectual property after purchasing it since it went defunct. In 2017, several NMK games began appearing on their Arcade Archives series of re-releases, beginning with Zed Blade. From 2021 onwards, other titles from the company, such as Thunder Dragon, Saboten Bombers, Hacha Mecha Fighter, Gunnail, Thunder Dragon 2 and Bomb Jack Twin started appearing afterwards.

== Game list ==
All games are developed by NMK unless otherwise specified. Parentheses are used to denote additional ports made without NMK's involvement.

Title	Release Date	Publisher	Platform	Refs
Argus	Jan 1986	Jaleco	Arcade, Famicom	
Arkista's Ring	Jun 1990	Sammy	NES	
Black Heart	May 1991	UPL	Arcade	
Bomb Jack Twin	Dec 1993	NMK	Arcade	
Butasan	Dec 1987	Jaleco	Arcade (ZX Spectrum, Commodore 64, MSX, Amstrad CPC, X68000)	
Desert War	Sep 1995	Jaleco	Arcade	
Double Dealer	1991	NMK	Arcade	
Esper Bōkentai	Oct 13, 1987	Jaleco	Famicom	
Gunnail	Jan 1993	NMK	Arcade	
Hacha Mecha Fighter	Nov 1991	NMK	Arcade	
Legend of Makai	Jul 1988	Jaleco	Arcade	
Mahjong Daireikai	Aug 1989	Jaleco	Arcade	
Mahjong Haō-den Kaizer's Quest	Feb 1992	UPL	PC Engine	
Ninja Crusaders	Dec 14, 1990	Sammy	NES	
Ninja Taro	Apr 8, 1991	UPL (JP), Sammy (NA)	Game Boy	
Okkotoshi Puzzle Tonjan!?	Sep 29, 1989	Jaleco	Famicom	
P-47: The Phantom Fighter	May 1988	Jaleco (JP/NA), Electrocoin (EU)	Arcade (Amiga, Amstrad CPC, Atari ST, Commodore 64, MS-DOS, PC Engine, Mega Drive, ZX Spectrum)	
P-47 Aces	Mar 1995	Jaleco	Arcade	
Psychic 5	Jan 1987	Jaleco	Arcade	
Quiz Gakuen Paradise	Jul 1991	NMK	Arcade	
Quiz Panicuru Fantasy	Sep 1994	NMK	Arcade	
Rapid Hero	Jul 1994	Media Shōji	Arcade	
Riot	1992	NMK (developed by Tecmo)	Arcade	
Rolan's Curse	Oct 26, 1990	Sammy	Game Boy	
Rolan's Curse II	Feb 21, 1992	Sammy	Game Boy	
Saboten Bombers	Apr 1992	Tecmo	Arcade	
Saint Dragon	Feb 1989	Jaleco	Arcade (ZX Spectrum, Amiga, Atari ST, PC Engine, Amstrad CPC, Commodore 64, MSX)	
Saiyūki World	Nov 11, 1988	Jaleco	Famicom (as Wonder Boy in Monster Land: Arcade, Master System, Commodore 64, PC Engine, Amstrad CPC, ZX Spectrum, Amiga, Atari ST, mobile phone)	
SD Keiji Blader	Aug 2, 1991	Taito	Famicom	
Super Spacefortress Macross	Sep 1992	Banpresto	Arcade	
Super Dimension Fortress Macross II	Jun 1993	Banpresto	Arcade	
Task Force Harrier	Oct 1989	UPL	Arcade (Mega Drive)	
Thunder Dragon	Aug 1991	Tecmo	Arcade	
Thunder Dragon 2	Oct 1993	Sammy	Arcade	
Urashima Mahjong	Jan 1989	UPL	Arcade	
USAAF Mustang	Jun 1990	UPL (arcade), Taito (Mega Drive)	Arcade, Mega Drive	
Valtric	Nov 1986	Jaleco	Arcade	
Zed Blade	Sep 1994	SNK	Arcade (Neo Geo)	

=== Collaboration with Dooyong ===
- Chulgyeok D-Day / The Last Day - Arcade (1990)
- Gun Dealer - Arcade (1990)
- Yam! Yam!? / Wise Guy - Arcade (1990)
