= Namco 50th Anniversary =

- Date: June 1, 2004 – March 31, 2006
- Type: Anniversary event
- Organized by: Namco
- Website: namco.co.jp/50th/

The Namco 50th Anniversary (Note: Japanese: ナムコ 創業50周年記念, Hepburn: Namuko Sōgyō 50 Shūnenkinen) was a celebration of the Japanese video game developer and publisher Namco, commemorating its establishment in 1955. Beginning on June 1, 2004, the anniversary included video games, toys, clothing, and events relating to Namco and its games. Games published under the 50th Anniversary label include Pac-Pix, Mr. Driller Drill Spirits, NamCollection, and Namco Museum 50th Anniversary. The Namco 50th Anniversary ended on March 31, 2006, when Namco was dissolved and merged into Namco Bandai Games.

== History ==
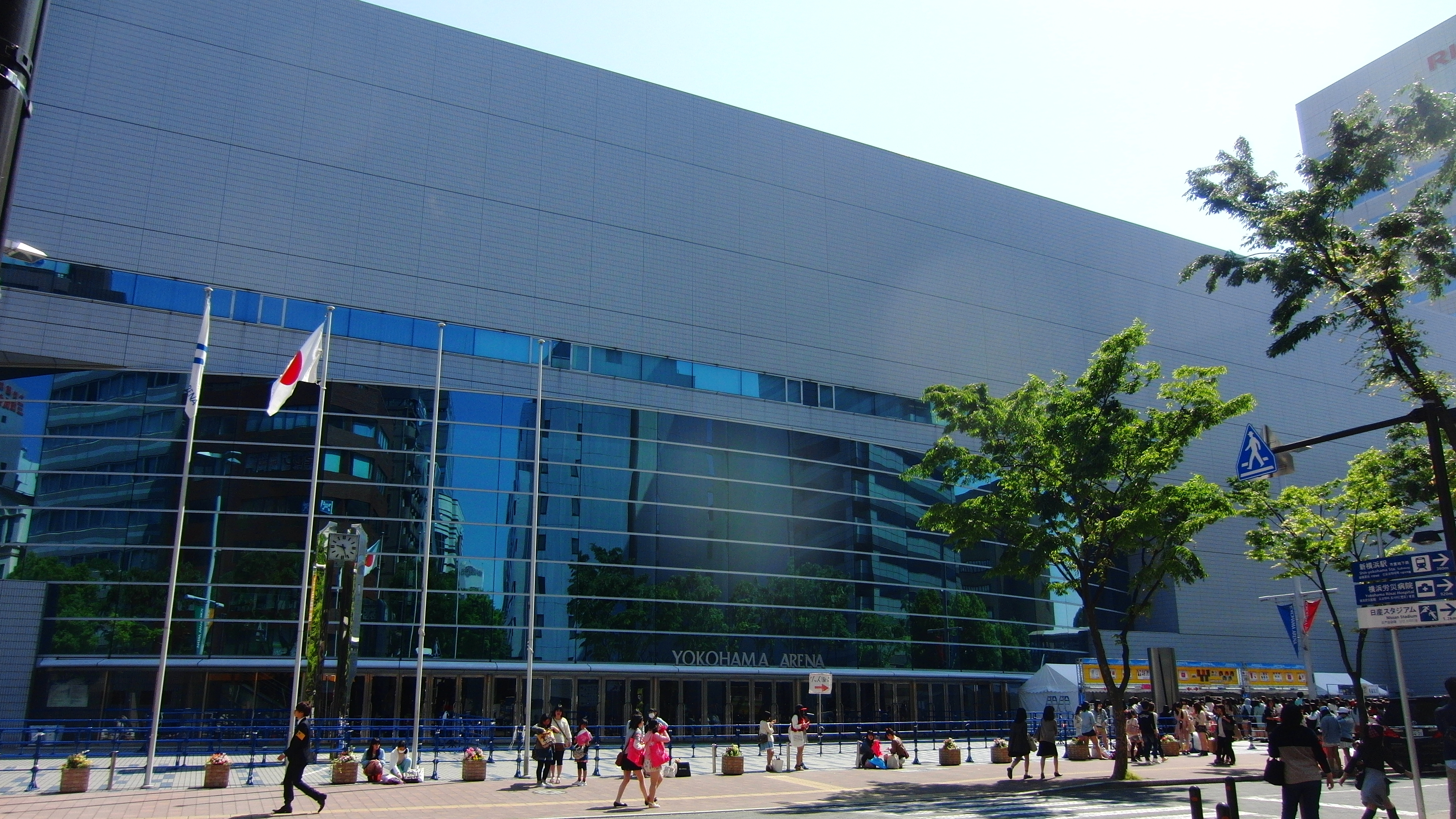
The Yokohama Arena, where the Namco 50th Anniversary event was held

The Namco 50th Anniversary event, officially known as the "50th Anniversary Campaign Period" was announced on May 20, 2004. Celebrating the company's founding as an amusement ride operator on June 1, 1955, the event would feature video games, toys, apparel, and advertising campaigns that symbolized Namco's ideology on forward-thinking and creativity. Namco also used the event as an opportunity to communicate with and express its gratitude towards its fans. The event's gold-colored logo features the image of a fairground rocking horse, the original mascot of Namco when it was known as Nakamura Seisakusho; the horse was to represent the company's origins in the coin-operated entertainment industry. The logo would be used on advertisements and orchestrated campaigns with other companies.

On June 1, 2004, Namco held a 50th Anniversary press conference at the Yokohama Arena, which saw an attendance number of over 1,000. Hosted by company executive chairman Masaya Nakamura, the conference featured the appearances of Namco's overseas executives, and discussed the company's future, expanding international operations, and corporate philosophy. A second was held on June 1, 2005 at a hotel in Tokyo, where Nakamura provided insight on the legacy of his company and its future. He also discussed Namco's upcoming business integration with Bandai, with Bandai president Takeo Takasu being invited to the presentation. The festivities included a ceremony conducted by Guinness World Records, which awarded Nakamura the award of "Most Successful Coin-Operated Game" for the worldwide success of Pac-Man. Nakamura was also given a congratulatory letter from Ken Kutaragi, the president of Sony Computer Entertainment, for Namco's Ridge Racer helping the PlayStation achieve considerable success in the console market. Other companies in the industry, including Nintendo and Microsoft, congratulated Namco for its milestone, as did former Prime Minister of Japan Yoshiro Mori. Several Japanese celebrities also appeared at the conference, including actor Akira Kobayashi.

On March 31, 2006, the Namco 50th Anniversary celebration concluded. The same day, Namco itself was dissolved as its assets were merged into a new company, Namco Bandai Games, following its merger with Bandai the year prior.

== Games ==
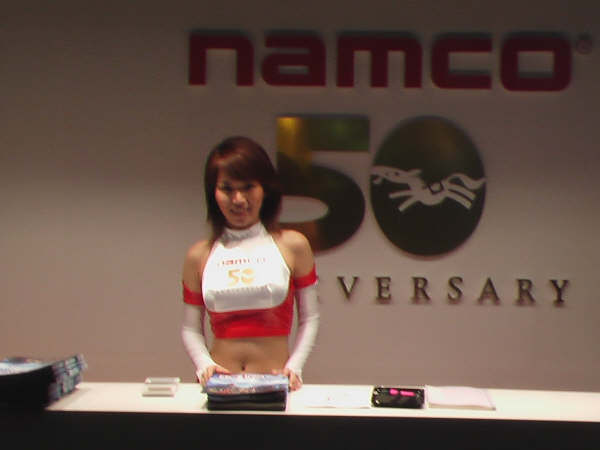
Namco 50th Anniversary model at the 2005 Tokyo Game Show

Several video games were produced for the 50th Anniversary celebration. On March 24, 2005, NamCollection was announced for the PlayStation 2 in Japan, being set for a June 2 release date before being pushed to July 31. The collection compiles five Namco-published PlayStation games —Ridge Racer, Tekken, Klonoa: Door to Phantomile, Ace Combat 2, and Mr. Driller—onto one disc, presented alongside rearranged soundtracks and artwork scans. A similar collection, Namco Museum 50th Anniversary, was published on August 30, 2005 for the PlayStation 2, Xbox, GameCube, and PC. Developed by Digital Eclipse, it includes 16 Namco arcade games, in addition to featuring five popular songs from the 1980s.

Mr. Driller Drill Spirits, an installment in the Mr. Driller series for the then-new Nintendo DS, was first released in North America on November 30, 2004. Produced as a launch title for the platform, it took advantage of the DS's dual screens and was rushed for release. Also released for the DS were the 3D platformer Pac 'n Roll and the puzzle game Pac-Pix, two spin-offs of the company's Pac-Man series that were also produced in conjunction for the franchise's 25th anniversary.
