= Pac-Man All-Stars =

2002 video game

- Developer: Creature Labs
- Publisher: Infogrames
- Series: Pac-Man
- Platform: Microsoft Windows
- Release: NA: May 14, 2002
- Genres: Maze
- Mode: Multiplayer

Pac-Man All-Stars is a 2002 video game for Microsoft Windows developed by British studio Creature Labs and published by Infogrames. It is a multiplayer video game where players control their characters to run around in different arenas to collect the most dots. The game is an enhanced version of the multiplayer mode found in Ms. Pac-Man Maze Madness and Pac-Man: Adventures in Time.

== Gameplay ==
The player, along with three other Pac-Man characters, must complete mission objectives. Missions include reaching a specific number of points and being the player with the highest score before the timer runs out. Each level ends with players having to avoid four ghosts while eating all of the pellets on screen.

Unlike Maze Madness, the levels are open areas with free movement. The worlds include: The Creepy Forest, The Mines, Snowy Mountain, Wandy's Garden, The Laboratory, and Wandy's Castle. After defeating the game's final boss, a large gray ghost named Wandy, the fairies that he had kidnapped are freed.

== Reception ==
Reception

Aggregate score
| Aggregator | Score |
|---|---|
| Metacritic | 53/100 |

Review scores
| Publication | Score |
|---|---|
| AllGame | 2/5 |
| GameSpot | 5/10 |
| GameZone | 6/10 |
| IGN | 8.3/10 |
| PC Gamer (US) | 68% |

Trey Walker of GameSpot criticized the game's level design, describing its arenas as "static" and providing "little more than bland backgrounds for pellet munching." He concluded that the game "doesn't add enough modern elements to successfully stand on its own merits" and was only entertaining "as a novelty for short while."

Todd Simmons of IGN praised the game's score-chasing gameplay but criticized its artificial intelligence, sound design, and short length, concluding that "those looking to win the highest score will have to spend plenty of time on this game."
