= Pac-Man Museum+ =

2022 video game compilation

- Developer(s): Now Production
- Publisher(s): Bandai Namco Entertainment
- Director(s): Syuhou Imai
- Producer(s): Minami Honda
- Series: Pac-Man
- Engine: Unity
- Platform(s): Microsoft Windows; Nintendo Switch; PlayStation 4; Xbox One
- Release: JP: May 26, 2022; WW: May 27, 2022
- Genre(s): Various
- Mode(s): Single-player, multiplayer

Pac-Man Museum+ is a 2022 video game compilation developed by Now Production and published by Bandai Namco Entertainment. Being a sequel to the 2014 compilation title Pac-Man Museum, Pac-Man Museum+ includes 14 games from the Pac-Man series, with additional features such as missions and online leaderboards.

The compilation was released worldwide on May 27, 2022, on Windows via Steam, Nintendo Switch, PlayStation 4, and Xbox One.

== Overview ==
Like the previous collection, Pac-Man Museum+ features fourteen games from the Pac-Man franchise, ranging from arcade titles to home console/handheld releases. These games are presented as playable machines in a virtual arcade, where the player can control Pac-Man and explore. The classic games are playable via emulation, while some of the modern games are ports. Some games in the collection are locked upon first startup, and require the player to complete two play sessions of specific games. The game features coins, which can be earned by obtaining high scores. These coins can be spent to play the arcade games in the collection, as well as to purchase objects from a vending machine and gashapon capsules at a gashapon machine. Objects for the arcade room can be unlocked by completing missions in games. These items can be placed throughout the arcade to customize it to the player's liking. Additional features to the games include a CRT filter, save points for select classic games and online leaderboards.

=== Games featured ===
- Pac-Man (1980)
- Super Pac-Man (1982)
- Pac & Pal (1983)
- Pac-Land (1984)
- Pac-Mania (1987)
- Pac-Attack (SNES (English) Version; 1993)
- Pac-In-Time (SFC (Japanese) Version; 1995)
- Pac-Man Arrangement (Arcade version as seen in Namco Classic Collection Vol. 2, labelled as Arcade Ver.; 1996)
- Pac-Man Arrangement (PSP version as seen on Namco Museum Battle Collection, labelled as CS Ver.; 2005)
- Pac-Man Championship Edition (2007)
- Pac-Motos (originally included in Namco Museum Remix; 2007)
- Pac 'n Roll Remix (originally included in Namco Museum Remix; 2007)
- Pac-Man Battle Royale (2011)
- Pac-Man 256 (console version; 2016)

Pac-Man Arrangement (2005) lacks the two-player mode found in the original game, similar to previous ports of the game.

== Production and release ==
Pac-Man Museum+ was developed by Now Production. The studio developed the compilation simultaneously with Pac-Man World Re-Pac starting in 2020. Pac-Man Museum+ was originally announced on social media platforms by Bandai Namco Entertainment on November 19, 2021, slated for an early 2022 release. On February 25, 2022, Famitsu announced a livestream showcasing first "hands-on" footage of Pac-Man Museum+, which was streamed on March 4, 2022. On February 28, 2022, the game was given a May 27, 2022 release date through social media announcements, alongside the game announced to be included on Xbox Game Pass on launch day. The game left the Xbox Game Pass lineup on May 31, 2024. In Japan, the game was scheduled to launch on Steam on May 28, 2022; the release moved a day earlier on May 25, 2022.

The versions of Pac-Land, Pac-In-Time and Pac-Attack in the collection are modified to replace almost all graphics of Ms. Pac-Man appearing in-game, with the Pac-Mom character created specifically for the compilation taking her place instead – as previously seen in the Arcade Archives re-release of Pac-Land, released a month earlier. The designs for Pac-Baby (named Pac-Sis in the collection) and Jr. Pac-Man (named Pac-Boy in the collection) have also been altered to remove resemblance to Ms. Pac-Man, as well as Chomp-Chomp's name being altered to Pac-Buddy. Despite the graphical replacements, Ms. Pac-Man appears within the credits for Pac-Man Arrangement CS. Ver, a potential oversight. Bandai Namco has not stated an official reason for the alterations, though news outlets assumed the changes to be tied to Ms. Pac-Man's ongoing legal dispute with AtGames.

== Reception ==
Reception

Aggregate score
Aggregator	Score
Metacritic	PS4: 72/100; NS: 75/100; XONE: 64/100

Review scores
Publication	Score
Gamezebo	3.5/5
HobbyConsolas	80/100
Nintendo Life	8/10
Nintendo World Report	7/10
Push Square	7/10
The Games Machine (Italy)	7/10

Pac-Man Museum+ received "mixed or average" reviews according to review aggregator website Metacritic.

Nintendo Life gave the title an 8 out of 10 and praised its emulation quality, interesting overworld setup, missions, online leaderboards, and the comprehensive collection of Pac-Man's history while criticizing the implementation of the CRT filter, the arcade overworld framerate, and a vertical synchronization issue present in Pac-Land. Push Square thought favorably of the large variety of games, interactive wrapper, and emulation quality, but took minor issue with input lag and a few poor game selections.

== See also ==
- List of Namco video game compilations
