= Pac-Man Mega Tunnel Battle =

2020 video game

- Developers: Heavy Iron Studios; Amber Studio (Chomp Champs)
- Publisher: Bandai Namco Entertainment
- Series: Pac-Man
- Platforms: Google Stadia, Nintendo Switch, Microsoft Windows, PlayStation 5, PlayStation 4, Xbox One and Xbox Series X/S
- Release: November 17, 2020; May 9, 2024 (Chomp Champs)
- Genres: Maze, battle royale
- Modes: Single-player, multiplayer

Pac-Man Mega Tunnel Battle is a battle royale maze game developed by Heavy Iron Studios. The game was originally released for Google Stadia on November 17, 2020. On January 18, 2023, the game was shut down when Stadia ended its service.

On October 10, 2023, Bandai Namco announced an expanded version of the game called Pac-Man Mega Tunnel Battle: Chomp Champs, which was released on Nintendo Switch, Microsoft Windows, PlayStation 5, PlayStation 4, and Xbox Series X/S on May 9, 2024. On September 30, 2025, the game was announced to shut down on December 31, 2025, with the game having delisted on November 1, 2025. Both Pac-Man Mega Tunnel Battle and Chomp Champs have received mixed reviews, praising the gameplay but criticizing its pricing and lack of content.

== Gameplay ==
Pac-Man Mega Tunnel Battle plays similarly to the original Pac-Man arcade game. However, the game has 3D-graphics and up to 64-players can play at a time. The players begin in their own mazes before more areas get unlocked. Once the player eats a power-pellet, the player can either eat ghosts or other Pac-Men like in Pac-Man Battle Royale or Pac-Man Party Royale. If the player gets eaten by a ghost or another Pac-Man, the game is over.

== Reception ==
Reception

Aggregate score
Aggregator	Score
Metacritic	Stadia: 67/100

Review score
Publication	Score
IGN	7/10

The original Stadia version of the game received mixed reviews from critics. The reviews liked the battle-royale format of the game, but criticized it for its lack of content and its pricing. Elisha Deogracias of Gaming Trend noted in his review that there are better free alternatives such as PUBG: Battlegrounds.

The Chomp Champs edition of the game also received "mixed or average" reviews from critics, according to Metacritic. Nintendo Life awarded the game a 5/10 in their review, giving praise to the concept but calling the execution "pointless".
