= Pac-Man and the Ghostly Adventures 2 =

2014 video game

- Developer: Vicious Cycle Software (Note: Released under the Monkey Bar Games brand)
- Publisher: Bandai Namco Games
- Producers: Rodney W. Harper; Bryan West
- Series: Pac-Man
- Engine: Vicious Engine 2
- Platforms: Nintendo 3DS; PlayStation 3 Wii U Xbox 360
- Release: October 14, 2014
- Genre: Platform
- Modes: Single-player, multiplayer

Pac-Man and the Ghostly Adventures 2, also known in Japan as Pac-World 2 (Note: Japanese: パックワールド2, Hepburn: Pakkuwārudo Tsū), is a platform video game developed by Vicious Cycle Software and published by Bandai Namco Games for the Wii U, Nintendo 3DS, Xbox 360 and PlayStation 3 on October 14, 2014. It is the sequel to Pac-Man and the Ghostly Adventures. The game received mixed reviews for its lack of innovation.

== Development ==
The game was first announced on March 1, 2014.

== Gameplay ==
Just like the original game, Pac-Man and the Ghostly Adventures 2 uses the same features as its predecessor, but features new storylines, characters and worlds. The game consists of new playable characters, like Spiral and Cylindria, and five different worlds, each containing between 10 and 20 levels. These levels can come in the form of power-up trials, where players are given a certain ability and are taught how to use it, while some are vehicle courses. In levels, Pac-Man can consume specific pellets that give him powers, like the ability to freeze enemies, jump higher than normal, throw fireballs, or stick to metallic platforms.

== Reception ==
Reception

Aggregate score
Aggregator	Score
Metacritic	3DS: 60/100; PS3: 59/100; X360: 60/100

Review scores
Publication	Score
Computer Games Magazine	X360: 6/10
GameRevolution	3DS: 7/10
Push Square	PS3: 6/10
The Guardian	3DS: 2/5
Hardcore Gamer	X360: 3/5
Nintendo Life	Wii U: 6/10; 3DS: 4/10
Nintendojo	3DS: B
Multiplayer.it	PS3: 6.9/10

Just like its predecessor, Pac-Man and the Ghostly Adventures 2 received mixed reviews upon release.

Hardcore Gamer gave the game a 3 out of 5, saying "While the first title burst onto the scene brimming with creativity not usually seen in a television cartoon adaption, the sequel is content to emulate everything that title did without adding anything notable of its own."

KXTV in Sacramento, California gave the game a 1.5 out of 4, saying "Pac-Man and the Ghostly Adventures 2 is in a weird place for a kids' video game. Younger and more novice gamers might find the game too difficult to play at times, and it may turn them off from it. Those at the older end of the kids' game scene might instead find the game too simple at times and justifiably frustrating to control. Kids who really enjoy the television program will no doubt want (and probably enjoy) this game based on its subject matter alone. Those who aren't in love with modern Pac-Man might want to let this game give up the ghost."

The Guardian gave the game a negative review, saying "In some ways, the game’s simple ambitions would not have been a problem if the recipe had been respectfully crafted. But to a modern audience spolied for choice when it comes to excellent family games, it is something of a travesty."
