= World's Biggest Pac-Man =

2011 video game

- Developer: Soap Creative
- Series: Pac-Man
- Platform: Browser
- Release: 13 April 2011
- Genre: Maze
- Mode: Single-player with multiplayer interaction

World's Biggest Pac-Man is a browser game created by Australian website designer Soap Creative along with Microsoft and Namco Bandai Games. It is a Pac-Man game which differed from the original by having multiple players play together in a series of user-created, customizable and interlocking mazes. The game was announced at the Microsoft MIX Developer Conference on 13 April 2011.

The game was built as a HTML5 project for Microsoft's (then) new Internet Explorer 9, as well as to commemorate the 30th anniversary of Pac-Man. A week after launching, it had 13,500 user-designed mazes and nearly 300 million dots eaten. Created as a community tribute to the original Pac-Man arcade game, it followed the guidelines that Namco Bandai originally set for Pac-Man. The project was designed to be community-driven and a team of moderators were implemented to keep an eye out for any offensive mazes that might be created.

Although no login is required to play the game, users who wish to create their own mazes or post high-scores have to sign in using Facebook Connect. Although created with Internet Explorer 9 in mind, World's Biggest Pac-Man is playable on any browser supporting HTML5.

== Gameplay ==
The gameplay for World's Biggest Pac-Man is similar to classic Pac-Man, but with a few differences. As before, the goal is to eat all of the dots and power pellets in the maze without being caught by the ghosts roaming through it. The number of power pellets is not fixed at four, but instead determined by the user who created that particular maze. In addition, there are no tunnels; instead, doorways at each edge of the screen allow Pac-Man to travel to an adjacent maze, with a new arrangement of dots and obstacles. Every maze has a fresh set of four ghosts, but they do not use the doorways. The player has the ability to move to a new maze without clearing the current one so they can return to any unfinished maze at a later time. The game continues until the player runs out of lives.

Another distinct feature in World's Biggest is the ability to construct new mazes adjacent to pre-existing ones. To build a maze a Facebook account is required, and is accessed via the Facebook Connect platform. The game also has two high score leader-boards, one where players could competing against each other for the top of the leader-board, and the other where countries were ranked based on their players' total high score. The player also has the option to display high scores online via Facebook.

=== Ghosts ===
One aim of the game, besides eating all the Pac-Dots, is avoiding any of the four ghosts roaming through the maze. Running into a ghost will kill Pac-Man on contact, unless Pac-Man consumed a Power Pellet. These pellets, which can be freely placed when creating a maze (a minimum of 0 and a maximum of 10 per maze), will turn the tables completely for a period of time by causing the ghosts to turn blue and run away from Pac-Man, allowing him to eat them. In the original game, the ghost AI was programmed in a well-defined pattern of Scatter, Chase and Repeat. Unlike the original, the time the ghosts remained vulnerable does not diminish as the game progresses to the point where the ghosts could merely reverse direction. If the player left a maze without completing it, the ghosts will stay where they left off in that maze until Pac-Man returned to that maze, after which they will begin chasing him again.

Enemy Color	World's Biggest Pac-Man			
Enemy Color	Character	Nickname	Alternate character	Alternate nickname
Red	Chaser	Red guy	Shadow	Blinky
Pink	Ambusher	Pink guy	Speedy	Pinky
Cyan	Fickle	Blue guy	Bashful	Inky
Orange	Stupid	Slow guy	Pokey	Clyde

=== Fruits ===
The fruits on World's Biggest Pac-Man are a potent means to earn additional points. The fruits appear upon consuming a certain number of pellets on the current maze and the player can retrieve them as long as they show up, but otherwise do not affect the completion of the level. By default, the fruit will be a 100-point cherry, and for every maze cleaned of pellets, the next maze attempted will advance to the next fruit and remain until the player finishes another board and the fruit value further increases. Once the player has cleared seven boards, the bonus "fruit" will be indefinitely locked at the 5,000-point key until the game ended.

- Cherry, 100 (or 200) points
- Strawberry, 300 (or 400) points
- Peach, 500 (or 600) points
- Apple, 700 (or 800) points
- Melon, 1000 (or 1500) points
- Galaxian, 2000 (or 2500) points
- Bell, 3000 (or 4000) points
- Key, 5000 points

=== Maze Creation ===
World's Biggest Pac-Man has a unique feature that distinguishes it from the original game, in which users are able to create their own mazes. This feature requires Facebook Connect. To create a maze, users can highlight a square in the maze grid. When creating a maze, users are able to add walls, power pellets, delete any excesses or mistakes, or simply reset the maze to start over. Once the maze is completed, users can submit it to add it to the grid alongside other user-created mazes. At the moment, the game has a grid of over 4,000 x 4,000, supporting over 16 million mazes. Dan Kitzler, of West Covina, California, USA, was the first to reach the edge of the "supposed" 4,000 X 4,000 grid on 21 November 2016. He went beyond that grid number, shattering the illusion that the grid only contains 16 million mazes. Dan contacted Ashley Ringrose (website creator), who admitted he had no idea about the actual size of the maze grid. The maze grid was made up of 25 X 25 (625 maze) quadrants.

== Reception ==
- The Guardian has called the game "an internet hit", while ABC News has called it a "web sensation".

=== High Scores ===
There was a Guinness World Record for "The highest score on World's Biggest Pac-Man". At the time, it was 5,555,552 points which was set by Stephen Kish on 14 August 2011. They no longer hold such a category on their website. That high score was beaten unofficially by a Twitch streamer known as NewTxtDoc. He reached a score of 11,111,108 over a 25-hour period from the 23 November to 24 November 2020.

== See also ==
- Super Mario Maker
- Mega Man Maker
