= Pac-Man VR =

1996 video game

- Developer: Virtuality
- Publisher: Virtuality
- Series: Pac-Man
- Release: 1996
- Genre: Maze
- Modes: Up to 2 players, alternating turns
- Arcade system: SU-2000, SU-3000

Pac-Man VR is a 1996 video game by Virtuality set in the Pac-Man universe. The game is set in a first-person perspective. The game did not change any gameplay mechanics of the original game, except adding a multiplayer feature.

== Gameplay ==
The game released for two of Virtuality's arcade VR systems. The 2000-SU series unit had the player stand in a ring set at the waistline. The player could turn their head and a tracking system built into the glasses would detect it and turn Pac-Man's head in the game. The 2000-SD series unit had players sit down and play more like a traditional arcade game while wearing the headset. An adaption for the SU-3000 systems was released, later on, making Pac-Man VR the only non-shooting game ever released for SU-3000 systems.

The game offered multiplayer through four cabinets, networking up to four PAC-MAN characters together, enabling them to see, talk, and compete with each in the same virtual maze while still trying to outwit the ghosts. Playing on the game cabinet itself cost five dollars for five minutes.
