= Pac-Man Battle Royale =

2011 video game

- Developer: Namco Bandai Games
- Publisher: Namco Bandai Games (Note: Released under the Namco brand name)
- Director: Kunito Komori
- Series: Pac-Man
- Platform: Arcade
- Release: JP: 2011; NA: January 21, 2011
- Genre: Maze
- Arcade system: Namco System 147

Pac-Man Battle Royale (Note: Japanese: パックマンバトルロイヤル, Hepburn: Pakkuman Batoru Roiyaru) is a 2011 maze battle-royale video game developed and published by Namco Bandai Games for arcades. An installment in the Pac-Man series, it was made in celebration of the series' 30th anniversary. The game sees up to four players control multi-colored Pac-Men as they try to compete to be the last Pac-Man standing.

It was released for arcades in January 2011, and was released on several platforms afterwards following its release.

== Gameplay ==
In Pac-Man Battle Royale, up to four players can compete at once, choosing a game length of between three and nine rounds. Each player controls a differently coloured Pac-Man character (yellow, pink, blue and red); a single player faces one computer-controlled Pac-Man opponent. The players move throughout a maze, avoiding ghosts and attempting to eat dots and power pellets scattered throughout. New dots and pellets appear whenever the players eat them all. In addition; if any player eats a bonus item that appears next to the ghosts' cage, all remaining dots and pellets are immediately removed and replaced.

When a Pac-Man eats a power pellet, they grow in size and can eat the ghosts and any un-powered Pac-Men until the pellet wears off. During this time, the un-powered Pac-Men turn blue but retain an outline of their original colour, and they cannot eat ghosts.

Un-powered Pac-Men are eliminated from the round when they either run into a ghost or are eaten by a powered-up Pac-Man. If two Pac-Men of equal strength run into each other, they are knocked backward a short distance but suffer no harm otherwise. Blue Pac-Men cannot knock or pass through each other.

Each round lasts a maximum of two minutes, with an on-screen countdown for the last 10 seconds. The last remaining Pac-Man wins the round. All players are brought back into the game at the start of each new round; after the final round, the player with the most victories is the overall winner.

== Development and release ==
Pac-Man Battle Royale was first displayed in the United States in a playable state at the 2010 Amusement Expo show in Las Vegas. in March 2010. It was then seen again at an after-party event during E3, where Namco America brought four cabinets for attendees to play. Namco also took the unusual step of throwing a party prior to the launch of the game at the Whiskey River Saloon in Madison, Wisconsin. It was not seen in Japan until September 2010 at the Amusement Machine Show, which is opposite of most major Namco arcade releases where they are shown off in Japan first and are later brought to the US.

While the game was reported for a release in September 2010, it was delayed for unknown reasons until late November 2010. Namco Bandai officially announced the release of the game on in North America on January 21, 2011.

== Ports and legacy ==
A demo version was released on the iOS App Store on January 28, 2011. The game was ported to Pac-Man Museum for a digital release (Xbox 360, PlayStation 3 and Microsoft Windows) in 2014. The game is included in the compilation title Pac-Man Museum+ (Microsoft Windows, PlayStation 4, Xbox One and Nintendo Switch) released in 2022.

The game would inspire several follow-up games, including Pac-Man Party Royale for Apple Arcade, Pac-Man Mega Tunnel Battle for Google Stadia, and Pac-Man 99 for Nintendo Switch.

A direct sequel, Pac-Man Battle Royale Chompionship, was released in June 2022.
