= Pac-Man Museum =

2014 video game compilation

- Xbox Live Arcade icon
- Developer: Mine Loader Software
- Publisher: Namco Bandai Games (Note: Released under the Namco brand name.)
- Series: Pac-Man
- Platforms: PlayStation 3 Microsoft Windows; Xbox 360
- Release: PlayStation Network: NA: February 25, 2014; PAL: February 26, 2014; JP: June 25, 2014; Xbox Live Arcade: WW: February 26, 2014; JP: June 25, 2014; Windows: WW: February 25, 2014
- Genres: Maze, Compilation

Pac-Man Museum is a 2014 compilation video game for Xbox 360, PlayStation 3 and Windows, developed by Mine Loader Software and published by Namco Bandai Games under the Namco label. It is a compilation of 9 (Note: A 10th game, Ms. Pac-Man, was available as DLC) Pac-Man games, with additional features such as achievements and online leaderboards.

It was released digitally in February 2014 on PlayStation Network, Xbox Live Arcade and Steam. Versions of the game for the Nintendo 3DS and Wii U were announced and intended to release on the Nintendo eShop, but was cancelled due to "delayed development". The game was delisted from all platforms on July 20, 2020. A sequel, Pac-Man Museum+, was released on May 27, 2022.

== Overview ==
Pac-Man Museum features 9 games from the Pac-Man series, ranging from the original maze games, puzzle games and platformers. Each game is based on their original arcade/console release (Pac-Attack is based on the Genesis/Mega Drive version, while Pac-Man Arrangement is based on its Namco Museum Battle Collection port). Additional features in the compilation include a special guide mode for Pac-Man, online and offline leaderboards, and achievements (console versions only).

The game also features an award system for each game (minus Ms. Pac-Man) called the Stampbook. Completing an achievement adds a stamp to the Stampbook (with each stamp representing the bonus fruits from the original Pac-Man). There are 8 stamps to fill for each game, with medals being awarded to the player for completing each game. Additionally, filling in a stamp adds a character or object from Pac-Man and the Ghostly Adventures to the Pac-Room (which is also displayed in the main menu), where the player can view Pac-Man's apartment from the TV series and view all obtained characters and items. These items range from characters from the series (like Pac-Man and the Ghosts), objects (including a Pac-Man's Arcade Party machine), and figurines based on the characters (as well as Galaga cameos). As well as being able to view close-ups of the characters and objects, they are also accessible through the game's Item List, which also displays information regarding each item or character.

=== Games featured in Pac-Man Museum ===
- Pac-Man (1980)
- Ms. Pac-Man (1982) (Available as DLC)
- Super Pac-Man (1982)
- Pac & Pal (1983)
- Pac-Land (1984; based on the Japanese version)
- Pac-Mania (1987; based on the Japanese version)
- Pac-Attack (Genesis/Mega Drive version; 1993)
- Pac-Man Arrangement (PSP version as seen on Namco Museum Battle Collection; 2005)
- Pac-Man Championship Edition (2007)
- Pac-Man Battle Royale (2011)

Ms. Pac-Man was originally available as free downloadable content until March 31, 2014. On April 1, 2014, the game became a $4.99 in-game purchase.

Pac-Attack and Pac-Man Battle Royale are the only games that retain their original multiplayer functionality; all other games had their multiplayer features removed.

== Reception ==
Reception

Aggregate score
Aggregator	Score
Metacritic	(PS3) 66/100 (X360) 66/100

Review scores
Publication	Score
Destructoid	7/10
Game Informer	7/10
Hardcore Gamer	4/5
Push Square	7/10

Pac-Man Museum received a score of 66/100 on Metacritic, a score of 6/10 on Steam, and Hardcore Gamer gave the game a 4/5, calling it "the best representation of what has been a truly illustrious video game career."

Destructoid gave the game a 7/10 rating, saying "Pac-Man Museum has a bunch of middling pieces, but the addition of Battle Royale is the icing on the cake. If you've never played Championship Edition before and thus do not have DX to compare it to, it's a perfect way to re-acclimate yourself to the franchise, while you use Royale to spice up your next local gathering. Everyone else who lacks friends on-hand or has already played CE should wait for a sale, or pass this one up entirely."

== See also ==
- List of Namco video game compilations
