= Pac-Man: Adventures in Time =

2000 video game

- Developers: Creative Asylum; Mind's Eye Productions
- Publisher: Hasbro Interactive
- Producers: Louise Metighe; Bret Robinson; Matt Clark; Marcus Fielding
- Designers: Nolan Worthington; Sam Donohoe
- Programmers: John Reynolds; Simon O'Connor
- Artists: Nolan Worthington; Sam Donohoe; Gary Switzer; Merlyn Lear
- Composer: Marcus Fielding
- Series: Pac-Man
- Platform: Microsoft Windows
- Release: NA: October 23, 2000; PAL: November 15, 2000; AU: December 24, 2000
- Genre: Maze
- Modes: Single player Multiplayer

Pac-Man: Adventures in Time is a 2000 maze video game in the Pac-Man series developed by Creative Asylum and Mind's Eye Productions, and published by Hasbro Interactive, in collaboration with Namco. The game follows a formula similar to the original arcade game, while expanding on it with new features, including mazes that creatively play with 3D space. In the game, Pac-Man travels through various time periods using Professor Pac-Man's time machine to recover pieces of an ancient artifact.

The game was released for Microsoft Windows PCs in 2000.

== Gameplay ==
Like the original Pac-Man, the objective of each level is to guide Pac-Man through a maze and eat all the dots in the maze, while avoiding the costumed ghosts that inhabit each level. Eating the power pellets scattered across the maze allows Pac-Man to eat the ghosts for a short period of time, awarding bonus points for eating ghosts continuously. After eating a certain number of dots, a bonus fruit appears in an area of the maze, which grants extra points when eaten. Eating all the dots allows Pac-Man to proceed to the next round. Pac-Man also has the ability to jump, allowing him to dodge ghosts, though a cooldown is triggered when performed; the length varies between game difficulties. If a ghost or deadly object comes in contact with Pac-Man, he loses a life. A game over occurs when all lives are lost. Extra lives are awarded for every 50,000 points scored. If Pac-Man stays on a round for too long, the original ghost gang (Blinky, Pinky, Inky and Clyde) appears and begins chasing Pac-Man more aggressively than when in costume.

Various rounds feature special gimmicks, such as hills that slow Pac-Man down when climbing up and speeds him up when descending, floor levels, elevators, deadly objects or creatures that can kill Pac-Man and the ghosts upon contact, etc. Some mazes take different forms, such as a cube, a cylinder, and a sphere. Said mazes also allow Pac-Man to walk on walls. In underwater sections of mazes, an oxygen meter appears which depletes slowly; Pac-Man loses a life if he runs out of oxygen. Oxygen is replenished by eating dots or by going back on the surface.

The camera tends to follow Pac-Man from a close-up view, though the game allows the maze to be viewed from a perspective on select levels.

The game features 45 rounds, spread across five different time periods such as pre-historic times, ancient Egypt, the Middle Ages, the wild west and the future. Between rounds, there are checkpoints that allow the player to save their game, as well as saving their current score and life count. Bonus mini-games occur after every few rounds, where Pac-Man can obtain bonus points. The mini-games consist of various different play styles. After completing the mazes in quest mode, they are unlocked in the maze mode.

The game features a multiplayer mode, which allows up to four players play as Pac-Man, Ms. Pac-Man, Professor Pac-Man and Baby Pac-Man to compete in various mini-games across different mazes. Unfilled player slots are controlled by the computer. Dot Mania consists of each player competing to be the first to eat 120 dots in a maze of regenerating dots. Time Bomb, in a similar fashion to hot potato, consists of the four players attempting to pass a ticking bomb to other players by coming in contact with them; the player that is holding the time bomb when the timer reaches zero is eliminated from play, and continues until there is one player left. Ghost Tag plays in a similar fashion to Dot Mania, except that 3 randomly selected players start as ghosts. The player that is Pac-Man must eat 120 dots and avoid the player-controlled ghosts. When a ghost catches the player that is Pac-Man, the player's ghost transforms into the player's respective Pac-Man; the player that was previously Pac-Man is turned into a ghost. The multiplayer mode support online and LAN play.

== Plot ==
Ghosts Inky and Clyde steal a golden power pellet known as the Artifact, under the command of a shadowy creature known as Mollusc. Mollusc smashes the Artifact; the result of the explosion scatters the Artifact's four fragmented pieces across time and space. Professor Pac-Man wakes up Pac-Man from his sleep and alerts him about the crisis. Professor Pac-Man prepares a hastily constructed time machine for Pac-Man that allows him to travel through time and recover the Artifact pieces.

Pac-Man travels through various time periods, including prehistoric times, Ancient Egypt, the Middle Ages, and the Wild West. Pac-Man eventually obtains all the artifact pieces; the time machine malfunctions and sends him to the future; with Professor Pac-Man stating that an alternate power source is needed to correctly power the time machine and bring Pac-Man back to the present. Pac-Man reaches the Reactor Core of a station and is able to harness its energy to be finally transported back to his own time period, with the Artifact reassembled.

Pac-Man returns to the present, arriving directly at the second after Mollusc breaks the original Artifact. Pac-Man uses the repaired Artifact to fire a beam that disintegrates Mollusc.

== Development ==
Collaboration between Namco and Hasbro began in April 1999 when Hasbro Interactive signed a license agreement allowing them to develop games in various franchises including Pac-Man, Dig Dug, Galaxian, Pole Position, Mappy, Bosconian, and several others.

Around the same time Ms. Pac-Man Maze Madness was in development, Namco & Hasbro reached out to Mind's Eye Productions to develop their own take on a 3D Pac-Man game. Mind's Eye was presented with a detailed design brief filled with ideas and brand expectations inspired by Ms. Pac-Man. Due to various factors, such as the studio's limited experience with 3D graphics, a limited staff at capacity with other commitments, and limited development time, the decision was made to contract Creative Asylum. An artist at Mind's Eye had previously worked with Creative Asylum Co-founder Nolan Worthington at Europress, and reached out for assistance with the project. Mind's Eye would develop the story, scenario, and cutscene FMVs while Creative Asylum designed & programmed the game.

Matt Clark gathered ideas from various Mind's Eye employees before taking a core team of designers and the Creative Asylum staff to a country house in Cardigan Bay for a week-long "kick-off design session" in mid-October 1999. From this session came two competing story ideas; the one that ultimately became the final story as pitched by Creative Asylum, and an earlier story from Mind's Eye in which Pac-Man must stop the planet's core from cooling down by collecting five magical power pellets, later revised to five slices of Magical Golden Pizza, while traveling to different levels underground. One early concept from Mind's Eye had Pac-Man cross a jungle filled with a cannibal Pac tribe, an up a mountain that contained a lab where Ghosts were genetically modifying Pac people, and down a volcano to the planet's core where he would meet lost civilizations such as the "Krispy Tribe" which lived in a crumbling environment (later deemed too dark for a Pac-Man Game). There was also an idea for Pac-Man's cousin Nero, a chili, would initially hinder the journey, but, with other "hot friends", would later become helpful. Transition from the Mind's Eye story to the final story was still in-progress as late as May 5, 2000 when an E3 press release announcing the game detailed a plot combining elements from both.

Hasbro and Namco had originally tasked Mind's Eye with creating their own take on a Pac-Man game in 3D in contrast to Maze Madness, and thus the studio originally envisioned primarily flat terrain with some level of slope physics. Creative Asylum decided that creating mazes using various 3D shapes and playing with 3D space would create more interest, which initially led to disagreements between the two studios until further prototypes convinced Mind's Eye. Mind's Eye then sought approval for the idea from Namco and series creator Tōru Iwatani, who gave the go ahead during a meeting at E3 2000. Producer Matt Clark later speculated in an interview that some of the ideas from Adventures in Time would go on to be included in Ms. Pac-Man Maze Madness.

Many gameplay ideas were conceptualized, but quickly dropped in the planning stages, as Mind's Eye had a policy of not disregarding ideas in early development, and that "the absurd could lead to something really cool." These including a taunt move, power-ups for ghosts, Pac-Man growing an extra limb such as an elephant trunk to disorientate ghosts, becoming radioactive to melt through walls, herding Pac children, and making ghosts into "pet allies". The original design document included a 3D scrolling game known as The Labyrinth which would have featured new Pac characters.

FMV sequences were produced by Mind's Eye using 3D Studio, with there originally being 68 "intermissions" planned to facilitate transitions between levels and introductions to minigame, which were later cut roughly in half.

The voice cast consists of Duncan MacLaren as Pac-Man and Professor Pac-Man, and Matt Clark as Mollusc. It was originally planned for dialogue to be fully voiced with the team going so far as to write dialogue for both Pac-Man and Professor Pac-Man to be recorded, but ultimately it was decided against.

The game's LAN multiplayer mode was proposed by Creative Asylum and was originally deemed unnecessary by Mind's Eye, who later conceded. This feature was tested right up until the game's final deadline and became very popular among the development staff.

== Reception ==
Reception

Aggregate score
Aggregator	Score
Metacritic	79/100

Review scores
Publication	Score
GameSpot	7.3/10
IGN	8.6/10

Pac-Man: Adventures In Time received mostly positive reviews. GameSpot praised the game, saying "The occasionally sluggish control can be a little frustrating, but not enough to take the fun out of the game,". The game currently holds a ranking of 79 out of 100 on Metacritic.
