= Pac-Man and the Ghostly Adventures (video game) =

2013 video game

- Boxart image released on each console
- Developers: Vicious Cycle Software (Note: Released under the Monkey Bar Games brand); Inti Creates (3DS)
- Publisher: Namco Bandai Games (Note: Released under the Namco brand name in PAL regions.)
- Director: Kinshi Ikegami (3DS)
- Producers: Bryan West; Tetsuya Yusa (3DS)
- Designers: Dave Ellis; Kinshi Ikegami (3DS); Masato Okudaira (3DS); Toshihisa Sakaino (3DS); Tomokazu Oonishi (3DS); Satoru Nishizawa (3DS)
- Writer: Dave Ellis
- Composers: Mina Hatazoe (3DS); Ippo Yamada (3DS)
- Series: Pac-Man
- Engine: Vicious Engine 2
- Platforms: Xbox 360, Microsoft Windows, PlayStation 3, Wii U, Nintendo 3DS
- Release: October 29, 2013: Wii U, Xbox 360, PS3, PC; NA: October 29, 2013; PAL: March 6, 2014; JP: June 25, 2014; Nintendo 3DS; NA: November 26, 2013; PAL: March 5, 2014; JP: June 19, 2014
- Genre: Platform
- Modes: Single-player, multiplayer

Pac-Man and the Ghostly Adventures, also known in Japan as Pac-World (Note: Japanese: パックワールド, Hepburn: Pakkuwārudo) is a 3D platform video game based on the TV series of the same name which aired on Disney XD from 2013 to 2015. It was released for the Xbox 360, Windows, PlayStation 3, and Wii U in October 2013, and was later released for the Nintendo 3DS in November of that year. The console and PC versions were developed by Vicious Cycle Software under their Monkey Bar Games division and the 3DS version was developed by Inti Creates. Both versions were published by Namco Bandai Games.

On March 1, 2014, Bandai Namco announced a sequel called Pac-Man and the Ghostly Adventures 2.

The game, along with Pac-Man and the Ghostly Adventures 2 and Pac-Man Museum were delisted from retailers in July 2020.

== Plot ==
The game begins with Pac-Man and his friends walk into Sir Cumference's lab. Three golden orbs are on a table, and while Sir C is explaining what they are to Pac-Man, four ghosts from the netherworld (Blinky, Inky, Pinky and Clyde) come and tell Pac-Man that Pacopolis is under attack by the forces of Betrayus, king of the netherworld. They do so to steal the Frigidigitator, a device Sir C made for when Betrayus would make another heat-wave device like the one from Season 1's "Betrayus Turns the Heat Up".

== Reception ==
Pac-Man and the Ghostly Adventures

Aggregate score
Aggregator	Score
Metacritic	(PS3) 51/100 (X360) 49/100 (WII U) 58/100

Review scores
Publication	Score
GameSpot	5/10
GameZone	4.5/10
Nintendo Life	7/10
Pocket Gamer	(3DS) 2.5/5
The Guardian	2/5
USgamer	(WII U) 2.5/5 (3DS) 2.5/5

Pac-Man and the Ghostly Adventures received mixed reviews. Nintendo Life gave 7.0/10, writing "Pac-Man's latest adventure is kid-friendly in the best way: this is a solid, enjoyable 3D platformer that's built with a level of care and polish not often seen in games aimed at this audience."

GameZone's David Sanchez gave Pac-Man and the Ghostly Adventures a 4.5/10, writing that "Ghostly Adventures looks okay — it's certainly nicer to look at than it is to play, that's for sure."
