= Pac-Man Party =

2010 video game

- North American Wii box art
- Developers: Tose; Namco Networks (Windows Mobile)
- Publishers: Namco Bandai Games (Note: Released under the Namco brand); Namco Networks (Windows Mobile)
- Director: Daisuke Ichihara
- Producer: Yasuhiro Minamimoto
- Designer: Hirokazu Yasuhara
- Series: Pac-Man
- Platforms: Wii, Nintendo 3DS, Windows Mobile
- Release: November 16, 2010: Wii; NA: November 16, 2010; EU: November 26, 2010; AU: December 2, 2010; JP: December 16, 2010 Windows Mobile February 24, 2011 Nintendo 3DS; NA: November 8, 2011; EU: February 10, 2012; AU: February 16, 2012; JP: March 22, 2012
- Genre: Party
- Modes: Single-player, multiplayer

Pac-Man Party (Note: Japanese: パックマンパーティ, Hepburn: Pakkuman Pāti) is a 2010 party video game released by Namco Bandai Games for the Wii, Windows Mobile, and Nintendo 3DS (with the latter released as Pac-Man Party 3D). It is similar to the Mario Party series and Monopoly games for the Wii. In the game's story mode, players must retrieve a stolen cookie recipe from Pac-Man's enemies Blinky, Pinky, Inky, and Clyde and return it to its rightful owner, Mr. Cookie. The game was released to coincide with Pac-Man's 30th anniversary. The game is notable for featuring redesigns of the main characters that would carry over to subsequent Pac-Man titles in the mid-2010s, culminating with Pac-Man and the Ghostly Adventures.

== Gameplay ==
The game includes a story mode known as "Mr. Cookie's Recipe". It also has a party mode for up to four players. There are over 50 minigames, which when played, allows players to unlock bonus content. It also has a "Classic Games" mode where players can play three classic Namco arcade games—Pac-Man, Galaga, and Dig Dug—with either the Wii Remote turned sideways or a Classic Controller. The 3DS version of the game allows players to do link-up 4 player with only one cartridge. The Wii version has two extra boards that the 3DS version does not have. A scaled-down version on Windows Phone has 2D graphics and contains 10 mini games. It lacks the "Classic Games" mode that the Wii and 3DS versions have but all three of the games from that mode have had their own separate releases on Windows Phone.

In the game, all players start at Mr. Cookie's factory with 1,000 cookies. The main object is to collect a set number of cookies and get to the cookie factory to win. When a player goes to an empty space or an empty castle, the player can build a castle or claim it. When players go to their own castle, they receive cookies (depending on the level). A player (or players) landing on an opponent's castle will battle in a minigame with each taking an attack and defense role. If the attacking player wins, the player takes the opponent's castle. If the defending player wins, the attack player (or players) loses a number of cookies depending on the castle's level. When the player returns to the cookie factory after each loop around the map, a cookie bonus is awarded along with a castle bonus based on the number of castles owned. There are a number of specialty spots on the map. If a player lands on a Millionaire Manor, something good will happen. If a player lands on a Tarot Tent, something bad could happen. If a player lands on Dr. Labo's Lab, the player might go to a different space or earn a power cookie. If the players pass the exclamation point (!) space enough times, an event will reveal the map's boss character and make part of the map change or become inaccessible. When a player next passes the boss' location, all players will fight against the boss in a minigame. The game ends when a player exceeds the number of cookies necessary and makes a final return to the cookie factory.

== Reception ==
Reception

Aggregate score
Aggregator	Score	
Aggregator	3DS	Wii
Metacritic	43/100	59/100

Review scores
Publication	Score	
Publication	3DS	Wii
Famitsu	28/40	26/40
GameRevolution	D	D+
GamesMaster	40%	N/A
GamesRadar+	N/A	2.5/5
GameZone	5/10	3.5/10
Jeuxvideo.com	13/20	13/20
NGamer	50%	45%
Nintendo Power	4.5/10	N/A
Nintendo World Report	5/10	8/10
Official Nintendo Magazine	37%	69%
411Mania	N/A	5/10

Pac-Man Party received "mixed or average" reviews, while Pac-Man Party 3D received "generally unfavorable" reviews, according to the review aggregation website Metacritic. Many critics would criticize the minigames for being too repetitive or similar to others, and for the game going on for too long. In Japan, Famitsu gave the game a score of one six, one seven, one six, and one seven for the former; and two sevens, one six, and one eight for the latter.

Eurogamer Italy was the most critical of the game, disliking its slow-paced gameplay, "uninspired" soundtrack and repetitive minigames, saying that the board game aspect was "convoluted" in comparison to the Mario Party series. GamesRadar+ criticized its low difficulty level in the single-player campaign and sound effects for being "annoying", while Nintendojo criticized the tilt controls in some of the minigames. Nintendo World Report, Eurogamer Italy, Nintendojo and GamesRadar+ would all criticize some of the minigames for being too similar to each other and for being repetitive after a while, with Eurogamer in particular labeling many of them as "unoriginal". Nintendo World Report also criticized the lack of other Pac-Man series characters such as Ms. Pac-Man, and that the included arcade games should have been those from the Pac-Man franchise instead of other Namco titles.

Despite its criticism, reviewers would praise its minigame selection, presentation and inclusion of Namco arcade games. Nintendo World Report was the most positive towards the game, praising its cartoony art-style, entertaining minigames and easy accessibility for players, saying that it has enough unique ideas to distinguish it from being a Mario Party clone. They also praised the board game aesthetic for its quick pace. Nintendojo commented that it made for a good family game, praising its soundtrack, minigame selection, and for the arcade games being a "great bonus". Eurogamer Italy echoed a similar response, saying that the inclusion of the arcade games was one of the only few positives for the game, alongside its interesting control layouts for some of the minigames. GamesRadar+ applauded the game's presentation and graphical style, which they commented look good for a Wii title.
