= Pac & Pal =

1983 video game

- Arcade flyer
- Developer: Namco
- Publisher: Namco
- Composer: Yuriko Keino
- Series: Pac-Man
- Platform: Arcade
- Release: JP: July 1983
- Genre: Maze
- Modes: Single-player, multiplayer
- Arcade system: Namco Super Pac-Man

Pac & Pal (Note: Japanese: パック＆パル, Hepburn: Pakku ando Paru) is a 1983 maze video game developed and published by Namco for arcades. It is the third installment of the Pac-Man series and the first to not be released in North America. Players control Pac-Man as he must eat the items in an enclosed maze while avoiding four colored ghosts that pursue him. Pac-Man is assisted by a green-colored creature named Miru (also called Mil), the titular "Pal", who brings the items back to the center box. Pac-Man can also collect power-ups that allow him to briefly stun the ghosts.

Pac & Pal is largely based on Super Pac-Man, the sequel to Pac-Man. When Super Pac-Man proved to be unsuccessful, Pac & Pal was created to refine many of its mechanics and build on its concept. The game was intended to be released in North America by Midway Games under the name Pac-Man & Chomp Chomp, which replaced Miru with Pac-Man's pet dog from Hanna-Barbera's animated adaptation of the series. Chomp Chomp was never released in America and was limited to a run of 300 machines produced for several European countries. Retrospectively, it has received attention for its premise and differences compared to its predecessors and has been listed among the strangest games in the Pac-Man franchise. It is included in several Namco compilations for various platforms.

== Gameplay ==
In-game screenshot, showing Pac-Man flipping over cards and collecting items locked within the maze

Controls consist of a four-position joystick and a button. Using the joystick, the player guides Pac-Man through an enclosed maze in which several items are locked behind doors. Several face-down cards are scattered throughout the maze; when Pac-Man runs over one of these, it flips over to reveal one of the items, which becomes unlocked so Pac-Man can eat it. Two items in each maze are power-ups, which correspond to "S" cards. Upon eating one of these, Pac-Man temporarily turns blue and grows larger; the player can now press the button to fire a beam that briefly stuns the ghosts. Items include a flagship from Galaxian, a red car from Rally-X, a trumpet, a snowman, and a miniature Pac-Man. The items are simply different cosmetically, and all of them have the same effect.

Assisting Pac-Man is the titular "Pal" character Miru, a green-colored creature with a pink bow. Whenever any items are unlocked, Miru will try to pick one up and carry it toward the center box; if Pac-Man does not catch up to her and eat the item before she enters the box, it disappears. Once all the items are gone, the level ends and the player earns bonus points for each item eaten, receiving a larger bonus for preventing Miru from taking any of them into the box. An orange area immediately below the center box causes the ghosts to slow down whenever they are inside and obscures both them and Pac-Man, leaving only the ghosts' eyes visible. The third level and every fourth level thereafter is a bonus stage with 10 cards and no ghosts; one card shows Miru, one shows the ghost Blinky, and the other eight have dollar signs. Points are awarded for each card flipped, and Miru's card doubles the total. The stage ends immediately if Blinky is found, but the player earns a larger bonus for finding him last. The player loses one life whenever Pac-Man touches a non-stunned ghost, but can safely run through Miru at any time. When all lives are lost, the game ends.

== Development and release ==
Pac & Pal was developed and published by Namco in July 1983 in Japan. It is the third game in the Pac-Man series that was made by Namco themselves, as Pac-Man's North American distributor Midway Games had produced many of their own sequels that Namco had little involvement with. Pac & Pal is largely based on Super Pac-Man, Namco's own sequel to the original, and retains a similar graphical style and many of its mechanics. With the Pac-Man brand increasing in popularity in Japan, Namco sought to produce a follow-up that matched its success. Super Pac-Man was largely unsuccessful, so Pac & Pal was made to improve on its flaws and update its core features. Yuriko Keino, who is best known for her work on games such as Dig Dug and Xevious, composed the soundtrack. Namco and Midway had plans to release Pac & Pal in North America under the new name Pac-Man & Chomp Chomp, which replaced Miru with Pac-Man's spherical dog from the Hanna-Barbera cartoon series. Pac-Man & Chomp Chomp was never released in North America due to the market being over-saturated with Pac-Man games. A limited run of 300 arcade units was produced for several European countries.

Pac & Pal never saw a home release until 1998, where it was included in the Japan-exclusive arcade collection Namco History Vol. 3 for Windows 95. Toy manufacturer Jakks Pacific included the game in many of their Pac-Man-branded "plug'n play" controllers throughout the mid-2000s. Pac & Pal is also included in a few Namco compilations such as Namco Museum Remix (2007), Namco Museum Virtual Arcade (2008), and Namco Museum Megamix (2010). To commemorate the launch of the Pac-Man and the Ghostly Adventures television series, Bandai added Pac & Pal to their Pac-Man Connect & Play controller in 2012. Pac & Pal is included in Pac-Man Museum (2014), alongside several other games in the series. In 2019, Arcade1UP released a Pac-Man "counter-cade" arcade machine that includes the original Pac-Man and Pac & Pal. Pac & Pal is included in Pac-Man Museum+ as a unlockable title.

== Reception ==
Reception

Review score
Publication	Score
AllGame	1.5/5

While Pac & Pal saw success in its first few months on the market, it was relatively a commercial failure and remained obscure for many years. The game's drastic differences compared to the original Pac-Man and Super Pac-Man and its limited production run have been attributed to its downfall. Retrospectively, Pac & Pal has gained attention for its many changes to the gameplay of its predecessors, and is seen among the stranger entries in the Pac-Man franchise.

In 1998, Anthony Baize of Allgame was largely critical of the game. He described its gameplay as "horrible", and criticized it for being too distant from the gameplay of the original Pac-Man. He wrote: "Overall, Pac & Pal is a travesty. In my mind, it holds the title as worst and weirdest Pac-Man sequel ever unleashed upon the world. Avoid this game." In his review of the Xbox 360 version of Pac-Man Museum, Hardcore Gamer's Jahanzeb Khan called it a "far more unusual sequel" to Pac-Man, and criticized Miru for being more of a hindrance than an aid to the player. Writing for Paste, Preston Burt listed it among the weirdest Pac-Man sequels for the addition of a second player character and its premise, saying that: "If you have no idea what's happening in this game, you're not alone."

Jeremy Parish of USgamer retrospectively reviewed Pac & Pal in commemoration of its 30th anniversary in 2013. He claimed that it made for one of the stranger entries in the series for its substantially different gameplay compared to Pac-Man and Ms. Pac-Man. Parish also said that many of the game's additions, namely Miru and the power-up items, detracted from Pac-Man's more minimalist approach and appeal. Ultimately, Parish said that the new mechanics and difference in play made it a much more difficult and stressful game compared to its predecessors, feeling that players would have a hard time succumbing to its "strange" ideas and gameplay that had a more action-oriented pace to it. He concluded his review with: "While Namco clearly hoped to sustain Pac-Man's tremendous legacy with an inventive follow-up, Pac & Pal hastened the series' demise. Pac & Pal was one in a string of duds and doesn't hold up very well in retrospect -- it's a real oddball of a game. Sometimes, though, weirdness is just as interesting in hindsight as true significance." Bobinator of Hardcore Gaming 101 argued that the difference in gameplay made Pac & Pal standout from other Pac-Man sequels, and that it helped make the game feel fresh and unique. He also believed that it represents Namco's willingness to experiment with the mechanics and concepts established in the original. Bobinator wrote: "Sadly, this would be the last time Namco would ever experiment quite this much with their well-used maze game formula. While Pac-Man would soon move into new genres entirely, later maze games would choose to play it safe. Experimentation like this would never be seen in the series again."
