= Ms. Pac-Man: Quest for the Golden Maze =

2001 video game

- Developer: Creature Labs
- Publisher: Infogrames
- Series: Pac-Man
- Platform: Windows
- Release: October 12, 2001
- Genres: Maze
- Modes: Single-player, multiplayer

Ms. Pac-Man: Quest for the Golden Maze is a Microsoft Windows game published by Infogrames and released in 2001.

== Plot ==
One day, Professor Pac is talking to Ms. Pac-Man. He tells her about the Golden Maze in Cleopactra, in the Temple of Dots. He says that only a true pacventurer can get to the maze and beat it. Ms. Pac-Man sets off to the Golden Maze to beat it, but Blinky, Pinky, Inky, and Sue try to get in her way.

== Reception ==
Reception

Aggregate score
Aggregator	Score
GameRankings	49%

Review scores
Publication	Score
GameSpot	3.7/10
IGN	3/10

It got mixed to negative reviews. GameRankings gave it 49%, and GameSpot gave it 3.7/10.

== See also ==
- Ms. Pac-Man
- Ms. Pac-Man Maze Madness
