= Professor Pac-Man =

1983 video game

- 1983 arcade flyer
- Developer: Dave Nutting Associates
- Publisher: Bally Midway
- Programmer: Rick Frankel
- Composer: Marc Canter
- Series: Pac-Man
- Platform: Arcade
- Release: February 11, 1983 (Note: Publication date only)
- Genre: Quiz
- Modes: Single-player, multiplayer
- Arcade system: Midway Astrocade

Professor Pac-Man is a quiz arcade video game that was produced by Bally Midway and released in August 1983. It is the seventh title in the Pac-Man series of games. It is also the last of only seven games from Bally Midway Manufacturing to run on their Midway Astrocade hardware. Only 400 cabinets were made; many of these were returned to the manufacturer and converted to Pac-Land cabinets.

== Description ==
Designed to capitalize on the perceived quiz game niche, Professor Pac-Man presented simple visual puzzles, and required the players (or "pupils", as they are called by the game) to solve each within a short time limit. Despite the game's usage of Namco's popular Pac-Man character, Professor Pac-Man did not fare very well in the arcades, due to its slow pace and its abandonment of the famous maze-based gameplay that made the previous titles so popular.

== Gameplay ==
Screenshot

The game is for one player or two (in a two-player game, the player who is the first to answer a question correctly receives its points) and consists of answering multiple-choice questions before the time runs out. The timer is the original Pac-Man, eating a row of pellets. The more pellets left when the players answer correctly, the higher the scores awarded. As the questions progress, Pac-Man eats the pellets more quickly. Bonus questions are awarded after a player answers between two and six questions correctly on their first try. The game ends when a player runs out of fruits (the game's equivalent of lives, which also serve as a difficulty indicator). Fruits are lost for a wrong answer on a regular question (but not a bonus question), and fruits can also be earned for answering a bonus question correctly (but not lost if answered wrong).

Midway had also originally planned to release three different versions of this game: Family (appropriate for all ages, but geared towards younger players), Public (appropriate for general audiences, but geared towards arcades and bars), and Prizes (for casinos).

The game has more than 500 questions and supported the ability to load new questions, but no new questions sets were ever released.

Although most of the questions have nothing to do with Pac-Man, certain questions (asking: "How many left/right turns to the fruit?") show the original Pac-Man maze (with a regular wall in the place of the ghost regenerator) and a line of pellets leading to a fruit in the center, and another question (which first requires the player to study a city scene) asks "Where would you go to play Prof Pac-Man?", while others require the player to fill in the blank lower-right square of a 16-square grid, with four different fruits (or Pac-Men facing different directions) in each row. On the questions which first require the player to study table settings ("Which was the correct sequence?" or "How many plates were (shape)?"), fruits would appear on the plates and Pac-Man would move from right to left as he ate them, if they were answered correctly, and for the questions which first require the player to study the light-up keys on giant telephones of various colors ("Which number was dialed?"), the receiver would come off the telephone and Pac-Man would appear to speak into it (again, if they were answered correctly).

== Development ==
The original idea for Professor Pac-Man came from world champion foosball player Johnny Lott and Ed Adlum, the publisher of RePlay. Their proposal involved traditional Pac-Man maze gameplay, with the player being prompted with a quiz question when eating a power-up. Midway accepted the proposal, and Dave Nutting Associates developed the game. However, maze gameplay was removed before release and Lott and Adlum were not notified. It failed to create much interest in the marketplace.

The game was written by Rick Frankel, with graphics by Mark Steven Pierce and Sue Forner, and sound and music by Marc Canter.

== Legacy ==
A Professor Pac-Man character appears in the Pac-Man World series. He looks similar to the character depicted in the Professor Pac-Man arcade game, except with the addition of a white mustache and a design closer to the official Pac-Man design. Despite Ms. Pac-Man and other characters being replaced in recent titles, Professor Pac-Man remains intact, implying he lacks any legal issues despite not being originally created by Namco.
