= Pac-Man Pinball Advance =

2005 video game

- North American cover art
- Developer: Human Soft
- Publishers: NA: Namco Hometek; EU: Zoo Digital Publishing
- Series: Pac-Man
- Platform: Game Boy Advance
- Release: NA: May 3, 2005; EU: August 19, 2005
- Genre: Pinball
- Mode: Single-player

Pac-Man Pinball Advance is a pinball video game developed by Hungarian studio Human Soft and published by Namco Hometek for the Game Boy Advance. It was released in North America on May 3, 2005. It is part of the Pac-Man video game franchise.

The game switches from normal Pac-Man gameplay to a pinball-style video game. Pac-Man Pinball Advance received mixed to negative reviews from critics, who felt that its gameplay was limited.

== Gameplay ==
The game has two Pac-Man styled tables to play on, and both incorporate themes from the Pac-Man universe. The ball is Pac-Man, who rolls up into a ball and continues to collect pellets much like he did in earlier notes. Like the other games in the Pac-Man series, there are four ghosts which wander the pinball tables after Pac-Man eats a power pellet.

Pac-Man is about to be hit by the left flipper.

The plot of the game focuses on the kidnapping of all the residents of Pac-Land by the four ghosts from the Pac-Man series, Blinky, Pinky, Inky, and Clyde. The plot is secondary to the gameplay of the game though, and mostly exists just as a premise to explain why Pac-Man is playing on a pinball table. The game does not contain a high scores table.

== Reception ==
Reception

Aggregate score
Aggregator	Score
Metacritic	52/100

Review scores
Publication	Score
Game Informer	7/10
GameSpot	3.4/10
GameSpy	2.5/5
Nintendo Power	7/10

Pac-Man Pinball Advance received mixed reviews from critics, who thought that there was a lack of content and sub-par graphics; it received a 52% and a 50.40% from review aggregate websites Metacritic and GameRankings respectively. GameSpot's Frank Provo heavily criticized the game for a lackluster graphics engine and its inappropriate physics engine. He called the lack of a high scores table "inexcusable". GameSpy's David Chapman felt that the game managed to capture the feel of the Pac-Man series, but ultimately was a bland video game. PALGN's David Low felt that the graphics and physics engine were adequate, but felt that the lack of content and the inclusion of only two pinball tables was the game's weak point.

== Cancelled sequel ==
A sequel titled Super Pac-Man Pinball for the Nintendo DS by Rubik Interactive (now Zen Studios) was scheduled for release in fall 2005. Reasons for cancellation are still not known.
