= List of Pac-Man video games =

Video game franchise

Pac-Man
- Genres: Maze
- Developers: Namco; Bandai Namco Studios
- Publishers: Namco; Bandai Namco Entertainment
- Creator: Toru Iwatani
- Composer: Toshio Kai
- Platform: List: Arcade, Atari 2600, Atari 5200, VIC-20, Commodore 64, Family Computer, NES, Atari 7800, MSX, Apple II, ZX Spectrum, Atari 8-bit, MSX2, Intellivision, x68000, Genesis, Game Boy, Game Gear, Super NES, PlayStation, Dreamcast, Windows, Mobile phone, Game Boy Color, Neo Geo Pocket Color, WonderSwan, LCD game, Nintendo 64, PlayStation 2, Xbox, GameCube, Game Boy Advance, iPod, Xbox 360, PlayStation 3, Wii, Nintendo DS, PlayStation Portable, Wii U, Nintendo 3DS, PlayStation 4, Xbox One, Switch, Xbox Series X/S, PlayStation 5, Switch 2, Nex Playground
- First release: Pac-Man; May 22, 1980
- Latest release: Pac-Man World 2 Re-Pac; September 26, 2025

Pac-Man (Note: Japanese: パックマン, Hepburn: Pakkuman) is a video game series and media franchise developed, published and owned by Bandai Namco Entertainment, a video game publisher that was previously known as Namco. Entries have been developed by a wide array of other video game companies, including Midway Games, Atari and Mass Media, Inc., and was created by Toru Iwatani. The first entry in the series was released in arcades in 1980 by Namco, and published by Midway Games in North America. Most Pac-Man games are maze chase games, but it has also delved into other genres, such as platformers, racing, and sports. Several games in the series were released for a multitude of home consoles and are included in many Bandai Namco video game compilations.

Pac-Man is one of the longest-running, best-selling, and highest-grossing media franchises in history, and the game has seen regular releases for over 40 years, has sold nearly 48 million copies across all of the platforms, and has grossed over $15 billion, most of which has been from the original arcade game. The character of Pac-Man is the official mascot of Bandai Namco, and is one of the most recognizable video game characters in history. The franchise has been seen as important and influential, and is often used as a representation for 1980s popular culture and video games as a whole.

Release timeline
1980	Pac-Man
1981
1982	Ms. Pac-Man
1982	Mr. & Mrs. Pac-Man
1982	Super Pac-Man
1982	Baby Pac-Man
1983	Pac-Man Plus
1983	Pac & Pal
1983	Professor Pac-Man
1983	Jr. Pac-Man
1984	Pac-Land
1985
1986
1987	Pac-Mania
1988
1989
1990
1991
1992
1993	Pac-Attack
1994	Pac-Man 2: The New Adventures
1995	Pac-In-Time
1996	Pac-Man Arrangement
1996	Pac-Man VR
1997
1998
1999	Pac-Man World
2000	Ms. Pac-Man Maze Madness
2000	Pac-Man: Adventures in Time
2001	Ms. Pac-Man: Quest for the Golden Maze
2002	Pac-Man All-Stars
2002	Pac-Man Fever
2002	Pac-Man World 2
2003	Pac-Man Vs.
2004
2005	Pac-Man Arrangement
2005	Pac-Pix
2005	Pac-Man Pinball Advance
2005	Pac 'n Roll
2005	Pac-Man World 3
2006	Pac-Man World Rally
2007	Pac-Man Championship Edition
2008
2009
2010	Pac-Man Championship Edition DX
2010	Pac-Man Party
2011	Pac-Man Battle Royale
2011	Pac-Man Tilt
2012
2013	Pac-Man Chomp Mania
2013	Pac-Man and the Ghostly Adventures
2014	Pac-Man and the Ghostly Adventures 2
2015	World's Largest Pac-Man
2015	Pac-Man 256
2016	Pac-Man Championship Edition 2
2017
2018	Pac-Man Championship Edition 2 Plus 2P
2019
2020	Pac-Man Mega Tunnel Battle
2021	Pac-Man 99
2022	Pac-Man Battle Royale Chompionship
2022	Pac-Man World Re-Pac
2023
2024	Pac-Man Mega Tunnel Battle: Chomp Champs
2025	Shadow Labyrinth
2025	Pac-Man World 2 Re-Pac

== Video games ==
=== Arcade video games ===
Game	Details
Pac-Man Original release date(s): JP: May 22, 1980; NA: October 1980	Release years by system: 1980 – Arcade; 1982 – Atari 2600 (Mar) See Pac-Man (Atari 2600 video game), Atari 8-bit (Jun), Atari 5200 (Nov); 1983 – Intellivision (Oct), Apple II, IBM PC, VIC-20, Commodore 64, TI-99/4A; 1984 – ZX Spectrum,NES, MSX; 1988 - x68000 1990 – Game Boy; 1991 – Game Gear; 1999 – Neo Geo Pocket Color, Game Boy Color; 2003 – Mobile; 2004 – Game Boy Advance; 2006 – Xbox Live Arcade, iPod Classic; 2007 – Virtual Console; 2010 – Windows Phone 7; 2026 – Nex Playground
Pac-Man Original release date(s): JP: May 22, 1980; NA: October 1980	Notes: Designed by a team of nine people led by Tōru Iwatani; Over 350,000 arcade cabinets were sold during the 1980s.; Players compete to obtain the highest scores and fastest play times; In 2004, the NES version was rereleased for the Game Boy Advance in the NES Classics Series.
Ms. Pac-Man Original release date(s): JP: September 24, 1981; NA: February 1982	Release years by system: 1981 – Arcade; 1983 – Atari 2600, Atari 5200; 1984 – Commodore 64; 1986 – Atari 7800; 1990 – NES, Genesis, Lynx; 1993 – NES (Alt version); 2006 – Xbox 360; 2016 – Xbox One, PlayStation 4, Windows
Ms. Pac-Man Original release date(s): JP: September 24, 1981; NA: February 1982	Notes: Developed by General Computer Corporation and published by Midway.; Namco provided creative input on character design and collected royalties.; Became the most successful arcade game in North America.
Mr. & Mrs. Pac-Man Original release date(s): April 1982	Release years by system: 1982 – Pinball
Mr. & Mrs. Pac-Man Original release date(s): April 1982	Notes: Pinball game with minor maze-game elements, developed by Bally Midway.
Super Pac-Man Original release date(s): JP: August 11, 1982; NA: October 1, 1982	Release years by system: 1982 – Arcade
Baby Pac-Man Original release date(s): October 11, 1982	Release years by system: 1982 – Pinball
Baby Pac-Man Original release date(s): October 11, 1982	Notes: Hybrid pinball/video game, developed by Bally Midway.
Pac-Man Plus Original release date(s): March 1983	Release years by system: 1982 – Arcade
Pac & Pal Original release date(s): July 1983	Release years by system: 1983 – Arcade
Professor Pac-Man Original release date(s): August 12, 1983	Release years by system: 1983 – Arcade
Jr. Pac-Man Original release date(s): 1983	Release years by system: 1983 – Arcade
Jr. Pac-Man Original release date(s): 1983	Notes: Developed by General Computer Corporation and published by Midway Games.
Pac-Land Original release date(s): 1984	Release years by system: 1984 – Arcade
Pac-Mania Original release date(s): 1987	Release years by system: 1987 – Arcade
Pac-Mania Original release date(s): 1987	Notes: This is the first 16-bit Pac-Man game in the series.
Pac-Man Arrangement Original release date(s): March 1996	Release years by system: 1996 – Arcade
Pac-Man Arrangement Original release date(s): March 1996	Notes: Was released as part of Namco Classic Collection Vol. 2.
Pac-Man VR Original release date(s): 1996	Release years by system: 1996 – Arcade
Pac-Man Battle Royale Original release date(s): 2011	Release years by system: 2011 – Arcade
Pac-Man Chomp Mania Original release date(s): 2013	Release years by system: 2013 – Arcade
Pac-Man Chomp Mania Original release date(s): 2013	Notes: Developed by Raw Thrills
World's Largest Pac-Man Original release date(s): 2015	Release years by system: 2015 – Arcade
Pac-Man Battle Royale Chompionship Original release date(s): 2022	Release years by system: 2022 – Arcade

=== Home console, handheld console, and PC games ===
Game	Details
Pac-Attack Original release date(s): WW: October 10, 1993	Release years by system: 1993 – Sega Genesis, SNES; 1994 – Game Boy, Game Gear; 1995 – CD-i; 2008 – Wii
Pac-Attack Original release date(s): WW: October 10, 1993	Notes: Puzzle game similar to Tetris; Gameplay is similar to Cosmo Gang the Puzzle, an arcade game released in Japan.; CD-i and Japanese Game Boy versions released as Pac-Panic.; Super NES version released on the Wii via Nintendo's Virtual Console; Was remade on the Japanese-exclusive Namco Anthology for PlayStation.
Pac-Man 2: The New Adventures Original release date(s): JP: August 26, 1994; NA: September 1994; EU: 1994	Release years by system: 1994 – Super NES, Genesis
Pac-Man 2: The New Adventures Original release date(s): JP: August 26, 1994; NA: September 1994; EU: 1994	Notes: Known in Japan as Hello! Pac-Man; The original Pac-Man is also included, but is a Super NES recreation of the NES version.; The Super NES version also includes Ms. Pac-Man. The Genesis version includes an exclusive extra game called "Pac-Jr.", not to be confused with Jr. Pac-Man.
Pac-In-Time Original release date(s): 1995	Release years by system: 1995 – Super NES, Game Boy, MS-DOS, Mac OS
Pac-In-Time Original release date(s): 1995	Notes: It is a reskin of Fury of the Furries.
Pac-Man World Original release date(s): 1999	Release years by system: 1999 – PlayStation; 2004 – Game Boy Advance
Pac-Man World Original release date(s): 1999	Notes: The original Pac-Man is also included.; It was released on the PlayStation Store in Japan and North America.
Ms. Pac-Man Maze Madness Original release date(s): 2000	Release years by system: 2000 – PlayStation, Nintendo 64, Dreamcast; 2004 – Game Boy Advance
Ms. Pac-Man Maze Madness Original release date(s): 2000	Notes: The original Ms. Pac-Man is also included.; It was released on the PlayStation Store in Japan.
Pac-Man: Adventures in Time Original release date(s): 2000	Release years by system: 2000 – Windows
Ms. Pac-Man: Quest for the Golden Maze Original release date(s): 2001	Release years by system: 2001 – Windows
Pac-Man All-Stars Original release date(s): 2002	Release years by system: 2002 – Windows
Pac-Man All-Stars Original release date(s): 2002	Notes: It was only released in North America, the European and Australian releases for it were cancelled.
Pac-Man Fever Original release date(s): 2002	Release years by system: 2002 – GameCube, PlayStation 2
Pac-Man World 2 Original release date(s): 2002	Release years by system: 2002 – GameCube, PlayStation 2, Windows, Xbox; 2005 – Game Boy Advance
Pac-Man World 2 Original release date(s): 2002	Notes: The original Pac-Man, Pac-Attack (Namco Anthology enhanced version), Pac-Mania, and Ms. Pac-Man are included as unlockables except for the Game Boy Advance version.; Many copies of the GameCube version of Pac-Man World 2 were also bundled Pac-Man Vs..; The Game Boy Advance version has completely different levels due to the system's limits.
Pac-Man Vs. Original release date(s): 2003	Release years by system: 2003 – GameCube; 2007 – Nintendo DS; 2017 – Nintendo Switch
Pac-Man Vs. Original release date(s): 2003	Notes: Many copies of the GameCube version of Pac-Man World 2 were bundled with this game.; On the DS, it is part of the Namco Museum DS compilation.; On the Switch, it is part of the Namco Museum compilation.
Pac-Man Arrangement Original release date(s): 2005	Release years by system: 2005 – PlayStation Portable
Pac-Man Arrangement Original release date(s): 2005	Notes: Was released as part of Namco Museum Battle Collection
Pac-Pix Original release date(s): 2005	Release years by system: 2005 – Nintendo DS
Pac-Man Pinball Advance Original release date(s): 2005	Release years by system: 2005 – Game Boy Advance
Pac 'n Roll Original release date(s): 2005	Release years by system: 2005 – Nintendo DS
Pac 'n Roll Original release date(s): 2005	Notes: The original Pac-Man is also included.; A modified version of it was later included in Namco Museum Remix and Namco Museum Megamix for Wii.
Pac-Man World 3 Original release date(s): 2005	Release years by system: 2005 – PlayStation 2, GameCube, Xbox, PlayStation Portable, Nintendo DS, Windows
Pac-Man World 3 Original release date(s): 2005	Notes: The original Pac-Man is also included.; The Xbox version is backwards compatible on the Xbox 360.
Pac-Man World Rally Original release date(s): 2006	Release years by system: 2006 – PlayStation 2, PlayStation Portable, GameCube, Windows
Pac-Man World Rally Original release date(s): 2006	Notes: The game was released in Europe, simply called Pac-Man Rally.
Pac-Man Championship Edition Original release date(s): 2007	Release years by system: 2007 – Xbox Live Arcade; 2009 – iOS; 2009 – Symbian; 2010 – PSP minis
Pac-Man Championship Edition DX Original release date(s): 2010	Release years by system: 2010 – Xbox Live Arcade, PlayStation Network, Windows PC
Pac-Man Championship Edition DX Original release date(s): 2010	Notes: An update in 2013 changed the name to Pac-Man Championship Edition DX+.
Pac-Man Party Original release date(s): 2010	Release years by system: 2010 – Wii, Nintendo 3DS
Pac-Man Party Original release date(s): 2010	Notes: The original Pac-Man is also included along with two other Namco arcade games.; Pac-Man receives an updated look.
Pac-Man Tilt Original release date(s): 2011	Release years by system: 2011 – Nintendo 3DS
Pac-Man Tilt Original release date(s): 2011	Notes: Was released as part of Pac-Man & Galaga Dimensions
Pac-Man and the Ghostly Adventures Original release date(s): 2013	Release years by system: 2013 – PS3, Wii U, Xbox 360, Windows PC, Nintendo 3DS
Pac-Man and the Ghostly Adventures Original release date(s): 2013	Notes: Based on the TV show by the same name.; The Nintendo 3DS version is a 2D platformer while it's a 3D platformer on other platforms.
Pac-Man and the Ghostly Adventures 2 Original release date(s): 2014	Release years by system: 2014 – Wii U, Nintendo 3DS, Xbox 360, PlayStation 3
Pac-Man and the Ghostly Adventures 2 Original release date(s): 2014	Notes: A sequel to the Pac-Man and the Ghostly Adventures video game, based on the TV show of the same name.
Pac-Man 256 Original release date(s): June 21, 2016	Release years by system: 2016 – Microsoft Windows, PlayStation 4, Xbox One, Mac, Linux
Pac-Man 256 Original release date(s): June 21, 2016	Notes: It was originally released on iOS and Android.; Bears no resemblance to the Pac-Man Connect and Play title of the same name.; It adds a multiplayer feature that wasn't in the original release on iOS and Android.
Pac-Man Championship Edition 2 Original release date(s): September 13, 2016	Release years by system: 2016 – Microsoft Windows, PlayStation 4, Xbox One; 2018 – Nintendo Switch
Pac-Man Championship Edition 2 Original release date(s): September 13, 2016	Notes: It is a sequel to Pac-Man Championship Edition and Pac-Man Championship Edition DX.; Rereleased on Nintendo Switch as Pac-Man Championship Edition 2 Plus; Plus version features a co-op mode known as Pac-Man Championship Edition 2 Plus 2P
Pac-Man Mega Tunnel Battle Original release date(s): November 17, 2020	Release years by system: 2020 – Stadia; 2024 – Nintendo Switch, Microsoft Windows, PlayStation 5, PlayStation 4, Xbox Series X/S
Pac-Man Mega Tunnel Battle Original release date(s): November 17, 2020	Notes: It is a 64-player battle royale game releasing first on Stadia.; A free demo was playable from October 20–27.; The game was shut down alongside the closure of the Stadia platform on January 18, 2023.; An updated version of the game, called "Pac-Man Mega Tunnel Battle Chomp Champs", was released in 2024 on multiple consoles.
Pac-Man 99 Original release date(s): April 7, 2021	Release years by system: 2021 – Nintendo Switch
Pac-Man 99 Original release date(s): April 7, 2021	Notes: A 99-player battle royale game exclusive to Nintendo Switch Online members.; The game was shut down and delisted on October 8, 2023.
Pac-Man World Re-Pac Original release date(s): WW: August 26, 2022	Release years by system: 2022 – PlayStation 4, PlayStation 5, Xbox Series X/S, Xbox One, Nintendo Switch, Microsoft Windows
Pac-Man World Re-Pac Original release date(s): WW: August 26, 2022	Notes: Remastered version of Pac-Man World
Shadow Labyrinth Original release date(s): WW: July 18, 2025	Release years by system: 2025 – PlayStation 5, Xbox Series X/S, Nintendo Switch, Nintendo Switch 2, Microsoft Windows
Shadow Labyrinth Original release date(s): WW: July 18, 2025	Notes: Takes place in Bandai Namco's UGSF timeline and is heavily influenced by Xevious
Pac-Man World 2 Re-Pac Original release date(s): WW: September 26, 2025	Release years by system: 2025 – PlayStation 4, PlayStation 5, Xbox Series X/S, Nintendo Switch, Nintendo Switch 2, Microsoft Windows
Pac-Man World 2 Re-Pac Original release date(s): WW: September 26, 2025	Notes: Remastered version of Pac-Man World 2

=== Compilations ===
Game	Details
Ms. Pac-Man/Galaga – Class of 1981 Original release date(s): 2000	Release years by system: 2000 – Arcade
Ms. Pac-Man/Galaga – Class of 1981 Original release date(s): 2000	Notes: An arcade game that features Ms. Pac-Man and Galaga, with the original Pac-Man being included as a secret game.
Pac-Man Collection Original release date(s): NA: July 13, 2001; PAL: December 7, 2001; JP: January 11, 2002	Release years by system: 2001 – Game Boy Advance; 2014 – Wii U Virtual Console
Pac-Man Collection Original release date(s): NA: July 13, 2001; PAL: December 7, 2001; JP: January 11, 2002	Notes: A collection for the Game Boy Advance that includes Pac-Man, Pac-Mania, Pac-Attack and Pac-Man Arrangement.; Developed by Mass Media and published by Namco
Pac-Man: 25th Anniversary Arcade Machine Original release date(s): 2005	Release years by system: 2005 – Arcade
Pac-Man: 25th Anniversary Arcade Machine Original release date(s): 2005	Notes: An arcade cabinet that includes Pac-Man, Ms. Pac-Man, and Galaga.
Pac-Man Power Pack Original release date(s): NA: September 17, 2008	Release years by system: 2008 – PlayStation 2
Pac-Man Power Pack Original release date(s): NA: September 17, 2008	Notes: A box set for the PlayStation 2 that features Pac-Man World 2, Pac-Man World 3 and Pac-Man World Rally.
Namco All-Stars: Pac-Man and Dig Dug Original release date(s): 2009	Release years by system: 2009 – Windows
Namco All-Stars: Pac-Man and Dig Dug Original release date(s): 2009	Notes: A compilation containing the original and "enhanced" versions of Pac-Man and Dig Dug.
Pac-Man's Arcade Party Original release date(s): 2010	Release years by system: 2010 – Arcade
Pac-Man's Arcade Party Original release date(s): 2010	Notes: Includes Pac-Man, Pac-Mania, and ten other Namco arcade games.; This comes with both a coin-op commercial version and a version without the coin slot for homes.; The home version also includes Ms. Pac-Man.
Pac-Man & Galaga Dimensions Original release date(s): JP: June 23, 2011; NA: July 26, 2011; AU: August 25, 2011; EU: August 26, 2011	Release years by system: 2011 – Nintendo 3DS
Pac-Man & Galaga Dimensions Original release date(s): JP: June 23, 2011; NA: July 26, 2011; AU: August 25, 2011; EU: August 26, 2011	Notes: The Pac-Man games included are the original Pac-Man, Pac-Man Championship Edition, and Pac-Man Tilt (a game that's new to this compilation). The collection also includes three games in the Galaga series.; Every game on the collection has online leader-boards.
Dual Pack: Pac-Man World 3 / Namco Museum DS Original release date(s): NA: October 31, 2012	Release years by system: 2012 – Nintendo DS
Dual Pack: Pac-Man World 3 / Namco Museum DS Original release date(s): NA: October 31, 2012	Notes: It's re-releases of the Nintendo DS version of Pac-Man World 3 and Namco Museum DS bundled into one package.; This bundle was only released in North America.
Pac-Man Museum Original release date(s): 2014	Release years by system: 2014 – Xbox 360, PlayStation 3, Windows
Pac-Man Museum Original release date(s): 2014	Notes: It is a compilation of ten Pac-Man games available exclusively as a digital download.; The planned Nintendo eShop release for Nintendo 3DS and Wii U was cancelled.
Pac-Man Championship Edition 2 + Arcade Game Series Original release date(s): NA: November 1, 2016	Release years by system: 2016 – PlayStation 4, Xbox One
Pac-Man Championship Edition 2 + Arcade Game Series Original release date(s): NA: November 1, 2016	Notes: It is a compilation of Pac-Man Championship Edition 2 and three games from the Arcade Game Series on a physical disc.
Pac-Man's Pixel Bash Original release date(s): 2018	Release years by system: 2018 – Arcade
Pac-Man's Pixel Bash Original release date(s): 2018	Notes: This cabinet includes 6 Pac-Man Games: Pac-Man, Ms. Pac-Man, Pac-Man Plus, Super Pac-Man, Pac & Pal & Pac-Mania along with 26 other non-Pac-Man Namco games.; There are 3 versions of this cabinet, a Coin-Op version for Arcades, and both a Cabaret and Chill version for homes.; Like Pac-Man's Arcade Party, only the home cabinets contain Ms. Pac-Man.
Pac-Man Museum+ Original release date(s): WW: May 27, 2022	Release years by system: 2022 – PlayStation 4, Xbox One, Nintendo Switch, Microsoft Windows
Pac-Man Museum+ Original release date(s): WW: May 27, 2022	Notes: Successor to Pac-Man Museum, featuring most of the games from said collection returning.; Games include Pac-Man, Super Pac-Man, Pac-Land, Pac & Pal, Pac-Mania, Pac-In-Time, Pac-Man Arrangement (1996), Pac-Man Arrangement (2005), Pac 'n Roll Remix, Pac-Man Championship Edition, Pac Motos, Pac-Man Battle Royale and Pac-Man 256.; Features missions for all games and a customizable arcade.; All games except Pac-Man Arrangement (2005) retain multiplayer support.
Pac-Man: Double Feature Original release date(s): WW: October 31, 2025	Release years by system: 2025 – Atari 7800
Pac-Man: Double Feature Original release date(s): WW: October 31, 2025	Notes: A 2-in-1 cartridge that contains a new Pac-Man port for the Atari 7800, as well as the original Atari 2600 version.; Bundled with the Atari 2600+ Pac-Man Edition.; Features artwork by Hiro Kimura, artist for the Atari 2600 version, with the manual containing an interview between him and Bob DeCrescenzo, programmer for the Atari 7800 version.

=== Games made primarily for mobile platforms ===
Game	Details
Pac-Man Remix Original release date(s): July 21, 2009	Release years by system: 2009 – iOS
Pac-Man Remix Original release date(s): July 21, 2009	Notes: A port of the Namco Museum Battle Collection version of Pac-Man Arrangement with all multiplayer features removed.
Pac-Match Party Original release date(s): June 10, 2010	Release years by system: 2010 – iOS
Pac-Match Party Original release date(s): June 10, 2010	Notes: A puzzle game where the player would clear out ghosts, fruit and presents.
Pac-Man Reborn Original release date(s): August 2010	Release years by system: 2010 – iOS
Pac-Man Reborn Original release date(s): August 2010	Notes: A virtual pet-simulator that was made to coincide the 30th anniversary of Pac-Man.; It was only available in Japan.
Pac-Chain Original release date(s): September 2, 2010	Release years by system: 2010 – iOS
Pac-Chain Original release date(s): September 2, 2010	Notes: A puzzle game where the player would tap on groups of colored ghosts.
Pac-Attack Original release date(s): October 14, 2010	Release years by system: 2010 – iOS
Pac-Attack Original release date(s): October 14, 2010	Notes: A demake of the game of the same name which used graphics from the original Pac-Man arcade game.
Pac'N-Jump Original release date(s): April 7, 2011	Release years by system: 2011 – iOS, Android
Pac'N-Jump Original release date(s): April 7, 2011	Notes: It was a game where you tilt the device to help Pac-Man bounce off platforms to reach to top.
Pac-Chomp! Original release date(s): April 21, 2011	Release years by system: 2011 – iOS, Android, Kindle Fire
Pac-Chomp! Original release date(s): April 21, 2011	Notes: It was another Bejeweled styled game like PAC-Match Party, but it featured only ghosts without fruits or presents, you slid the ghosts instead of tapping, and there was buttons that turn quadrants of the puzzle.
Pac-Man Games Original release date(s): March 29, 2012	Release years by system: 2012 – iOS
Pac-Man Games Original release date(s): March 29, 2012	Notes: A compilation of various "S" (score attack) variations of Pac-Man, Rally-X, Dig Dug, Galaga, Gator Panic and Pac-Chain. It was delisted from the App Store on March 30, 2015.
Pac-Man Kart Rally Original release date(s): December 3, 2012	Release years by system: 2012 – Android, Kindle Fire
Pac-Man Kart Rally Original release date(s): December 3, 2012	Notes: A port of a 2010 Windows Mobile title. Not to be confused with Pac-Man World Rally.
Pac-Man + Tournaments Original release date(s): March 22, 2013	Release years by system: 2013 – Android, iOS; 2015 – Kindle Fire
Pac-Man + Tournaments Original release date(s): March 22, 2013	Notes: A port of the original Pac-Man that featured several new mazes and leaderboards.; Later renamed in PAC-MAN only.; Also known as Pac-Man: Let’s Play!.
Pac-Man Dash! Original release date(s): July 18, 2013	Release years by system: 2013 – iOS, Android
Pac-Man Dash! Original release date(s): July 18, 2013	Notes: An endless runner game featuring characters from the Pac-Man and the Ghostly Adventures television series.
Pac-Man Monsters Original release date(s): February 6, 2014	Release years by system: 2014 – iOS, Android
Pac-Man Monsters Original release date(s): February 6, 2014	Notes: A puzzle game that is based on Puzzle & Dragons and features several Pac-Man and Namco characters.
Pac-Man Friends Original release date(s): October 3, 2014	Release years by system: 2014 – iOS, Android; 2015 – Kindle Fire
Pac-Man Friends Original release date(s): October 3, 2014	Notes: It's a fast paced game where you move Pac-Man characters with tilt controls.
Pac-Man 256 Original release date(s): August 20, 2015	Release years by system: 2015 – iOS, Android, Kindle Fire
Pac-Man 256 Original release date(s): August 20, 2015	Notes: Developed by Hipster Whale, the team that also developed Crossy Road.; A free-to-play endless runner inspired by the "Level 256" glitch found in the original Pac-Man.; Bears no resemblance to the Pac-Man Connect and Play title of the same name.; It was later ported to Microsoft Windows, PlayStation 4, and Xbox One with added multiplayer features.
Pac-Man Bounce Original release date(s): September 17, 2015	Release years by system: 2015 – iOS, Android
Pac-Man Bounce Original release date(s): September 17, 2015	Notes: Developed by V2 Games.; A puzzle game released to coincide with the 35th anniversary of Pac-Man.
Pac-Man Puzzle Tour Original release date(s): February 25, 2016	Release years by system: 2016 – iOS, Android
Pac-Man Puzzle Tour Original release date(s): February 25, 2016	Notes: It's a matching game where Pac-Man eats all sets of three of the same kind of fruit in a row.
Pac-Man Pop! Original release date(s): August 18, 2016	Release years by system: 2016 – iOS, Android
Pac-Man Pop! Original release date(s): August 18, 2016	Notes: It's a matching game where you flick balls colored like the four ghosts to eliminate the down-coming balls.
Pac-Man Hats Original release date(s): August 19, 2016	Release years by system: 2016 – Android
Pac-Man Hats Original release date(s): August 19, 2016	Notes: It plays like the original Pac-Man but it now has new mazes and lets Pac-Man wear hats that can do special abilities.
Pac-Man Hats 2 Original release date(s): October 4, 2017	Release years by system: 2017 – Android
Pac-Man Hats 2 Original release date(s): October 4, 2017	Notes: It's a sequel to Pac-Man Hats.
Pac-Man Maker Original release date(s): November 22, 2017	Release years by system: 2017 – iOS, Android (canceled)
Pac-Man Maker Original release date(s): November 22, 2017	Notes: It lets players create custom Pac-Man mazes.; Only released in Canada
Pac-Man Party Royale Original release date(s): October 18, 2019	Release years by system: 2019 – iOS, macOS, tvOS
Pac-Man Party Royale Original release date(s): October 18, 2019	Notes: A party video game released exclusively for Apple Arcade. Developed by Pastagames.
Pac-Man Geo Original release date(s): October 14, 2020	Release years by system: 2020 – iOS, Android
Pac-Man Geo Original release date(s): October 14, 2020	Notes: Uses Google Maps to generate Pac-Man mazes on real-world streets.; Servers were shut down on October 28, 2021, rendering the game unplayable.; A similar proof-of-concept was used as Google Maps' "April Fools' Day" joke in 2017.

Also having been released as iOS applications are ports of the original Pac-Man, Ms. Pac-Man, Pac-Mania, and Pac-Man Championship Edition (all of these except for Pac-Mania have also been released on Android). Emulated versions of the original Pac-Man and Pac-Land are included in the defunct Namco Arcade application for iOS and Android. There was also a Pac-Man themed Twitter application for iOS devices, the Pac-Man Live Wallpaper application for iOS and Android devices, the Pac-Man Watch Face for Android Wear, and Pac-Man Moving Stickers for iOS. In July 2015, Pac-Man Championship Edition DX was released on both iOS and Android. Both versions were discontinued in March 2020.

=== Other titles ===
Game	Details
Kick/Kick-Man Original release date(s): 1981	Release years by system: 1981 – Arcade; 1982 – Commodore 64/Atari 2600 (cancelled)
Kick/Kick-Man Original release date(s): 1981	Notes: Action game developed by Bally Midway; Features Pac-Man as a character that assists the primary character; Originally released as Kick before being retitled as Kick-Man
Pac-Man no Desktop Daisakusen Original release date(s): JP: 1997	Release years by system: 1997 – Microsoft Windows
Pac-Man no Desktop Daisakusen Original release date(s): JP: 1997	Notes: A Pac-Man-themed desktop assistant that included screensavers, minigames and folder icons.
Pac-It Original release date(s): 2000	Release years by system: 2000 – VMU
Pac-It Original release date(s): 2000	Notes: A game that was exclusive to the Dreamcast version of Namco Museum and was played using the Dreamcast VMU memory pack.
Pac-Man Plug It In & Play TV Games Original release date(s): 2004	Release years by system: 2004 – TV Games
Pac-Man Plug It In & Play TV Games Original release date(s): 2004	Notes: A handheld TV game released by Jakks Pacific as part of its TV Games line in 2004. As of 2007, over 15 million Pac-Man TV Games units were sold.
Mario Kart Arcade GP Original release date(s): JP: 2005; NA: 2005	Release years by system: 2005 – Arcade
Mario Kart Arcade GP Original release date(s): JP: 2005; NA: 2005	Notes: Racing game developed jointly by Namco and Nintendo; Includes Pac-Man, Ms. Pac-Man, and Blinky as player characters
Mario Kart Arcade GP 2 Original release date(s): 2007	Release years by system: 2007 – Arcade
Mario Kart Arcade GP 2 Original release date(s): 2007	Notes: Racing game developed jointly by Namco and Nintendo; Includes Pac-Man, Ms. Pac-Man, and Blinky as player characters
Space Invaders vs. Pac-Man Original release date(s): JP: September 1, 2005	Release years by system: 2005 – Mobile phone
Space Invaders vs. Pac-Man Original release date(s): JP: September 1, 2005	Notes: The title is a collection of two cross-over games that swaps characters between Taito's Space Invaders and Namco's Pac-Man.; It was released for a limited time (September 1, 2005 – October 31, 2005) via NTT DoCoMo's i-mode service in Japan only.; The game was released as part of Namco's 50th anniversary, as well as to commemorate the 25th anniversary of Pac-Man.
QuickSpot Original release date(s): JP: February 9, 2006; NA: March 8, 2007	Release years by system: 2006/2007 – Nintendo DS
QuickSpot Original release date(s): JP: February 9, 2006; NA: March 8, 2007	Notes: The North American version added references to Pac-Man and other Namco characters that weren't in the original Japanese version or the Korean version of the game.
Pac-Man Google Doodle Original release date(s): WW: 21 May 2010	Release years by system: 2010 – Web Browser
Pac-Man Google Doodle Original release date(s): WW: 21 May 2010	Notes: It was the first ever interactive Google Doodle in the form of a playable Pac-Man game to celebrate the 30th Anniversary of the original Pac-Man.
Body and Brain Connection Original release date(s): JP: 20 November 2010; EU: 11 February 2011; NA: 08 February 2011	Release years by system: 2010/2011 – Xbox 360
Body and Brain Connection Original release date(s): JP: 20 November 2010; EU: 11 February 2011; NA: 08 February 2011	Notes: One of the mini games included is Pac-Man themed with the graphics of Pac-Man Championship Edition, you use the Kinect to guide Pac-Man with one hand and grab fruit with the other hand.
World's Biggest Pac-Man Original release date(s): WW: 13 April 2011	Release years by system: 2011 – Web Browser
World's Biggest Pac-Man Original release date(s): WW: 13 April 2011	Notes: It lets users create their own maze which is connected to other user-made mazes to make a single huge "Pac-Man maze".
Pac-Man S Original release date(s): WW: June 1, 2011	Release years by system: 2011 – Social game (Facebook platform), iOS (as part of a compilation)
Pac-Man S Original release date(s): WW: June 1, 2011	Notes: The title was one of 6 games Bandai Namco released for the Facebook platform, including a Facebook release of the original Pac-Man.; It was ported to the iOS in 2012 as part of Pac-Man Games.; The Facebook version became no longer available on March 19, 2013 while the iOS version (along with the rest of the Pac-Man Games application) was pulled from the App Store on March 30, 2014.
Everybody's Golf 6 Original release date(s): PlayStation Vita: JP: 17 December 2011; EU: 22 February 2012; NA: 22 February 2012; PlayStation 3: JP: 22 November 2012; EU: 24 July 2013; NA: 23 July 2013	Release years by system: 2011/2012 – PlayStation Vita, PlayStation 3
Everybody's Golf 6 Original release date(s): PlayStation Vita: JP: 17 December 2011; EU: 22 February 2012; NA: 22 February 2012; PlayStation 3: JP: 22 November 2012; EU: 24 July 2013; NA: 23 July 2013	Notes: Pac-Man appears as a DLC golfer as of August 22, 2013.
Pac-Man 256 Original release date(s): WW: 2012	Release years by system: 2012 – Pac-Man Connect and Play
Pac-Man 256 Original release date(s): WW: 2012	Notes: It's a modified version of Pac-Man that starts off on Round 255 instead of Round 1 because it's only one round before its infamous "kill screen".; It has the same name as Crossy Road developer's Pac-Man 256 but is a completely different game.; It was renamed Pac-Level 256 on the packaging for the reprint of Pac-Man Connect & Play that celebrates the 35th anniversary of the original Pac-Man.
Street Fighter X Tekken Original release date(s): NA: March 6, 2012; JP: March 8, 2012; EU: March 9, 2012	Release years by system: 2012 – PlayStation 3, Xbox 360, Windows, Vita
Street Fighter X Tekken Original release date(s): NA: March 6, 2012; JP: March 8, 2012; EU: March 9, 2012	Notes: Pac-Man is a playable character exclusively in the PlayStation 3 and PlayStation Vita versions.
Pac-Man Smash Original release date(s): WW: 2012	Release years by system: 2012 – Arcade
Pac-Man Smash Original release date(s): WW: 2012	Notes: Pac-Man Smash is a Pac-Man themed air hockey table released into arcades by Namco Bandai Games. It is a localization of a Japanese air hockey table called Big Bang Smash. Japan's Big Bang Smash has no references to Pac-Man in it, the Pac-Man references were added into the localization. It is a four way air hockey table with many pucks instead of only one puck.
Mario Kart Arcade GP DX Original release date(s): JP: July 25, 2013	Release years by system: 2013 – Arcade
Mario Kart Arcade GP DX Original release date(s): JP: July 25, 2013	Notes: Racing game developed jointly by Namco and Nintendo; Includes Pac-Man as a player character
Namco High Original release date(s): WW: December 2013	Release years by system: 2013 – Web Browser
Namco High Original release date(s): WW: December 2013	Notes: Pac-Man is in the game.; It is no longer available as of June 30th, 2014.
Mario Kart 8 Original release date(s): JP: May 29, 2014; NA: May 30, 2014; EU: May 30, 2014	Release years by system: 2014 – Wii U
Mario Kart 8 Original release date(s): JP: May 29, 2014; NA: May 30, 2014; EU: May 30, 2014	Notes: As of the 4.0 update, the Amiibo featuring Pac-Man can be used to unlock a costume based on Pac-Man's original appearance for the player's Mii character.
Super Smash Bros. for Nintendo 3DS and Wii U Original release date(s): Nintendo 3DS: JP: September 13, 2014; NA: October 3, 2014; EU: October 3, 2014; Wii U: NA: November 21, 2014; EU: November 28, 2014; JP: December 6, 2014	Release years by system: 2014 – Nintendo 3DS, Wii U
Super Smash Bros. for Nintendo 3DS and Wii U Original release date(s): Nintendo 3DS: JP: September 13, 2014; NA: October 3, 2014; EU: October 3, 2014; Wii U: NA: November 21, 2014; EU: November 28, 2014; JP: December 6, 2014	Notes: Pac-Man is a playable character in the game.; Ms. Pac-Man appears as a background character in the Pac-Land themed stage in Super Smash Bros. for Wii U.
Outcast Odyssey Original release date(s): iOS: WW: October 15, 2014; Android: WW: 2014	Release years by system: 2014 – iPhone, iPod Touch, iPad, Android
Outcast Odyssey Original release date(s): iOS: WW: October 15, 2014; Android: WW: 2014	Notes: It has Pac-Man themed DLC.
Galaga: TEKKEN 20th Anniversary Edition Original release date(s): iOS: WW: April 30, 2015; Android: WW: April 29, 2015	Release years by system: 2014 – iPhone, iPod Touch, iPad, Android
Galaga: TEKKEN 20th Anniversary Edition Original release date(s): iOS: WW: April 30, 2015; Android: WW: April 29, 2015	Notes: Pac-Man can be summoned.
Pixels Defense Original release date(s): iOS: WW: 2015; Android: WW: 2015	Release years by system: 2015 – iPhone, iPod Touch, iPad, Android
Pixels Defense Original release date(s): iOS: WW: 2015; Android: WW: 2015	Notes: It is based on the movie Pixels.; It has characters from Pac-Man, Galaga, and Dig Dug in the game.
Crossy Road Original release date(s): iOS: WW: 2015; Android: WW: 2015	Release years by system: 2015 – iPhone, iPod Touch, iPad, Android
Crossy Road Original release date(s): iOS: WW: 2015; Android: WW: 2015	Notes: Pac-Man was added as a playable character through an update.; The same team that made Crossy Road (Hipster Whale) also made Pac-Man 256.
Oculus Arcade Original release date(s): WW: November 9, 2015	Release years by system: 2016 – Oculus Rift
Oculus Arcade Original release date(s): WW: November 9, 2015	Notes: It is an application that lets you play a selection of classic video games and arcade games including the original Pac-Man.
Pac-Man Ghost & Stage Maker Original release date(s): JP: March 10, 2016	Release years by system: 2016 – Web Browser
Pac-Man Ghost & Stage Maker Original release date(s): JP: March 10, 2016	Notes: It lets users create mazes and design ghosts.; It is only in Japanese language.
Arcade Game Series Original release date(s): WW: April 19, 2016	Release years by system: 2016 – PlayStation 4, Xbox One, Windows
Arcade Game Series Original release date(s): WW: April 19, 2016	Notes: It is a series of downloadable classic Namco arcade games including games in the Pac-Man series.; Dig Dug, Galaga, Ms. Pac-Man, and Pac-Man make up the initial set.
Super Smash Bros. Ultimate Original release date(s): Nintendo Switch: WW: December 7, 2018	Release years by system: 2018 – Nintendo Switch
Super Smash Bros. Ultimate Original release date(s): Nintendo Switch: WW: December 7, 2018	Notes: Pac-Man is a playable character in the game.
Pac-Man Community Original release date(s): WW: 6 December 2021	Release years by system: 2021 – Facebook Gaming
Pac-Man Community Original release date(s): WW: 6 December 2021	Notes: It lets players create their own mazes; You get to play online with up to 4 players.; The game drew 6 million players during its four-month open beta period.; The game was removed from Facebook on February 4, 2023, rendering it unplayable.
PAC-MAN: Waka Waka Run Original release date(s): WW: 29 November 2023	Release years by system: 2023 – TikTok
PAC-MAN: Waka Waka Run Original release date(s): WW: 29 November 2023	Notes: Players use their mouth to control PAC-MAN.; The goal is to reach the end as fast as possible while eating Pellets and dealing with the Ghosts.; The game can be found in Bandai Namco Mobile's TikTok channel under the "Effects" tab.

=== Cancelled Pac-Man games ===
Game	Details
Count Pacula Original release date(s): Cancelled	Release years by system: Cancelled – Arcade
Count Pacula Original release date(s): Cancelled	Notes: The game was to be a maze-pinball hybrid, very similar to Baby Pac-Man.
Pac-Man Ghost Zone Original release date(s): Cancelled	Release years by system: Cancelled – PlayStation
Pac-Man Ghost Zone Original release date(s): Cancelled	Notes: A planned 3D platformer developed by Namco Hometek. The project would eventually be reworked into Pac-Man World.
Super GPS Pac-Man Original release date(s): Cancelled	Release years by system: Cancelled – WonderSwan
Super GPS Pac-Man Original release date(s): Cancelled	Notes: A game that would use the WonderGate addon to convert the player's location to a game of Pac-Man, with roads as the maze and moving vehicles as ghosts.
Ms. Pac-Man Maze Madness 2 Original release date(s): Cancelled	Release years by system: Cancelled – PlayStation 2, Xbox, GameCube
Ms. Pac-Man Maze Madness 2 Original release date(s): Cancelled	Notes: Planned as a sequel to Ms. Pac-Man Maze Madness
Pac-Man Adventures Original release date(s): Cancelled	Release years by system: Cancelled
Pac-Man Adventures Original release date(s): Cancelled	Notes: Pac-Man game featuring designs by animator Don Bluth. Many of the concepts went on to be used in Pac-Man World 3.
Super Pac-Man Pinball Original release date(s): Cancelled	Release years by system: Cancelled – Nintendo DS
Super Pac-Man Pinball Original release date(s): Cancelled	Notes: Planned sequel to Pac-Man Pinball Advance, but instead of it being developed by Human Soft, it was being developed by Zen Studios.
Pac-Man Carnival Original release date(s): Cancelled	Release years by system: Cancelled – Wii
Pac-Man Carnival Original release date(s): Cancelled	Notes: Similar Wii games including Namco Museum Remix, Namco Museum Megamix, and Pac-Man Party have been released later on.
Pac-Man World (2010) Original release date(s): Cancelled	Release years by system: Cancelled
Pac-Man World (2010) Original release date(s): Cancelled	Notes: Seemingly planned to be a brand new entry to the Pac-Man World series, more to be a reboot to the games.

Pac-Man Museum was released on Xbox Live Arcade (Xbox 360), PlayStation Network (PS3) and Windows PC (through Steam); the planned Nintendo eShop release for Wii U and 3DS was cancelled. Pac-Man and the Ghostly Adventures 2 was also originally going to have a Windows version.

== Other media ==
=== Animated series ===
==== Pac-Man (1982–1983) ====
Pac-Man is an American animated television series produced by Hanna-Barbera Productions and it is the first series based on the franchise. It premiered on ABC and ran for 44 episodes over two seasons from September 25, 1982, to November 5, 1983. It was the first cartoon based on a video game.

The series aired on ABC Saturday Morning in the following formats:

- The Pac-Man/Little Rascals/Richie Rich Show (September 25, 1982 – September 3, 1983)
- The Pac-Man/Rubik, the Amazing Cube Hour (September 10, 1983 – September 1, 1984)

==== Specials (1982) ====
Pac-Man Halloween Special: The Halloween special consisted of two segments from the show, "Pacula" and "Trick or Chomp". The special aired in primetime on ABC on October 30, 1982. It has been replayed on channels like Cartoon Network and Boomerang during Halloween in later years until 2014.

Christmas Comes to Pac-Land: In this Christmas special, Pac-Man and his family help Santa Claus (voiced by Peter Cullen) after he crash lands in Pac-Land (after the reindeer were startled by the floating eyes of the Ghost Monsters after Pac-Man, Ms. Pac-Man and Pac-Baby chomped them). Mezmeron was the only character from the cartoon that is not in the special (although his lair, which is covered in snow, appears). It was shown every December on the Boomerang Christmas Party until 2014.

==== Pac-Man and the Ghostly Adventures (2013–2015) ====
Pac-Man and the Ghostly Adventures, known in Japan as Pac-World, (Note: Japanese: パックワールド, Hepburn: Pakkuwārudo) is an animated television series produced by 41 Entertainment, Arad Productions, a partnership between Sprite Animation Studios and OLM, Inc., and Bandai Namco Entertainment for Tokyo MX (stereo version), BS11 (stereo version) and Disney XD (bilingual version). Based on Bandai Namco's Pac-Man video game franchise, it is the second animated series to be based upon the game franchise, following the 1982 TV series. The show aired from June 15, 2013, to May 29, 2015, running for three seasons and 52 episodes.

==== Pac-Man: Snack Breaks (2026) ====
In May 2026, an animated web series titled Pac-Man: Snack Breaks was announced. The series is produced by Bandai Namco Entertainment, with animation by Cartuna. Episodes were released on the PAC-MAN Official YouTube channel starting May 22, with new episodes released monthly.

=== Film ===
Various attempts for a feature film based on Pac-Man have been planned since the peak of the original game's popularity. Following the release of Ms. Pac-Man, a feature film was being developed, but never reached an agreement. In 2008, a live-action film based on the series was in development at Crystal Sky. In 2022, plans for a live-action Pac-Man film were revived at Wayfarer Studios, based on an idea by Chuck Williams. In 2025, the film was reportedly canceled as a result of the It Ends with Us controversy.

The character of Pac-Man appeared in the 2012 animated film Wreck-It Ralph and the 2015 science fiction film Pixels.

=== Attractions ===
The kid's area of the park originally opened in 1983 as Pac-Man Land. Today the park is called Bugs Bunny Boomtown since 2014. Due to the appearance of Looney Tunes characters since 1985. The attractions are now based on Looney Tunes characters. (The 1982 cartoon is owned, as of 1996, by Warner Bros.)

== See also ==
- List of maze video games
- List of Namco games
- List of Pac-Man clones
