= Pac-Attack =

1993 video game

- North American SNES box art by Greg Martin
- Developer: Namco
- Publishers: JP: Namco; NA: Namco Hometek; EU: Nintendo (SNES); EU: Namco/Philips Media; NA: Namco Networks (iOS)
- Composer: Hiromi Shibano
- Series: Pac-Man
- Platforms: Super NES, Sega Genesis/Mega Drive, Game Gear, Game Boy, CD-i, iOS
- Release: October 1993: Super NES; NA: October 1993; EU: 1993 Genesis/Mega Drive; NA: 1994 (Note: Advertised as available for Genesis in 1994 issues of gaming magazines; packaging bears a 1993 copyright.); EU: December 1995 Game Gear; NA: June 1994 Game Boy; NA: December 1994; JP: December 9, 1994; EU: 1995 CD-i; EU: 1995 iOS; NA: October 14, 2010
- Genre: Puzzle
- Modes: Single-player, multiplayer

Pac-Attack, (Note: Japanese: パックアタック, Hepburn: Pakku Atakku) also known as Pac-Panic, (Note: Japanese: パックパニック, Hepburn: Pakku Panikku) is a 1993 tile-matching puzzle video game developed and published by Namco for the Super Nintendo Entertainment System. Versions for the Sega Genesis, Game Boy, Game Gear, and Philips CD-i were also released. The player is tasked with clearing out blocks and ghosts without them stacking to the top of the playfield — blocks can be cleared by matching them in horizontal rows, while ghosts can be cleared by placing down a Pac-Man piece that can eat them. It is the first Pac-Man game to be released exclusively for home platforms.

Pac-Attack is an adaptation of the 1992 game Cosmo Gang the Puzzle, which was released for arcades worldwide and for the Super Famicom in Japan. Music was composed by Hiromi Shibano, and the cover art was designed by Greg Martin. To promote the game's release, a contest was held in GameFan magazine that awarded cash prizes to players who submitted their highest scores.

Critical reception for the game was mixed; while some disliked its lack of replay value and inferiority to other games such as Tetris and Columns, others praised it for its addictiveness and clever usage of the traditional Pac-Man gameplay. It has since been ported to several systems and included in a number of Pac-Man and Namco compilations for multiple platforms. A reskin of Pac-Attack was created for the Nintendo DSi's DSiWare download service titled Korogashi Puzzle Katamari Damacy, based on the Katamari series.

== Gameplay ==
SNES version screenshot

Pac-Attack is a falling tile puzzle game, often compared to games such as Tetris and Columns. The player drops down formations of blocks and ghosts onto a vertical-oriented playfield, the objective being to score as many points possible before the pieces reach the top of the screen. Blocks can be cleared by matching them in horizontal rows that touch both ends of the playfield; however, ghosts can only be cleared by placing down a Pac-Man piece, which will eat any ghosts in his path. The direction that Pac-Man is facing will show which direction he will move — if he gets stuck in a spot with no ghosts left, Pac-Man disappears. Eating ghosts will cause a “fairy meter”, located at the left of the screen, to fill up — once the meter is full, a fairy piece will appear that clears any and all ghosts below it, which can be used to cause chain reactions.

Alongside a standard single-player mode, a multiplayer mode is also included that pits two players against each other, the objective being to clear as many pieces possible while also causing additional pieces to stack up on the opponent's side. Clearing out blocks or ghosts will cause additional pieces to fall on the other player's side, and once the blocks in a player's side stack to the top, the other is deemed the winner. The game also features a Puzzle Mode, where the player is to clear out each ghost in a pre-set level in as few moves as possible. This mode spans 100 levels, and completing one will give the player a password that can be used to start at that stage again.

== Development and release ==
Pac-Attack was released for the Super Nintendo Entertainment System in North America in October 1993. It is an adaptation of Namco's 1992 arcade game Cosmo Gang the Puzzle, released for arcades worldwide and the Super Famicom in Japan. The soundtrack was composed by Hiromi Shibano, while the cover art was designed by Greg Martin. To help promote the game's release, Namco hosted a contest in GameFan magazine where players could submit their scores to win prizes, the grand prize being a $500 gift certificate. Some European and Japanese releases were titled Pac-Panic.

The CD-i conversion features completely remade artwork. In 1998, the Genesis version was released for the PlayStation as part of the Japan-only compilation Namco Anthology 2, alongside a remake featuring fully redone graphics and music. A Game Boy Color conversion was bundled with the original Pac-Man in 1999, titled Pac-Man: Special Color Edition. The Genesis version is also included as an unlockable in the 2001 PlayStation 2, Xbox and GameCube compilation Namco Museum, alongside the arcade game Pac-Mania, and in the Game Boy Advance game Pac-Man Collection the same year. The Namco Anthology 2 remake is an unlockable extra in Pac-Man World 2. An iOS “demake” of the game, featuring graphics from the original Pac-Man arcade game, was released in 2010, later delisted from the App Store in 2015. The Genesis version is also included in the Xbox 360, PlayStation 3 and PC collection Pac-Man Museum, released in 2014.

The SNES version of the game was included in the 2022 PC, PlayStation 4, Xbox One and Nintendo Switch video game compilation Pac-Man Museum+ as an unlockable title. Despite being an emulated version of the original game, the game was modified to replace the Ms. Pac-Man and Baby Pac-Man characters (who appear as cameos on the game's high score table), in favor of the Pac-Mom and Pac-Sis characters, created for the collection. While it has been no officially confirmation on why the changes were made, it is assumed to be tied to Ms. Pac-Man's ongoing AtGames dispute.

A Katamari game based on the gameplay of Pac-Attack was released on the DSiWare service for the Nintendo DSi called Korogashi Puzzle Katamari Damacy (Note: Japanese: ころがしパズル塊魂, Hepburn: Korogashi Pazuru Katamari Damashii; Rolling Puzzle Katamari Damacy) made by Namco Bandai Games in 2009. Hatsune Miku was licensed to perform the ending theme.

== Reception ==
Reception

Aggregate score
Aggregator	Score
GameRankings	66% (SNES); 70% (Genesis)

Review scores
Publication	Score
AllGame	4.5/5 (GG)
Electronic Gaming Monthly	7/10, 6/10, 6/10, 7/10, 7/10 (GG)
GamePro	4/5 (SNES)
TouchArcade	3/5 (iOS)
CD-i	80% (CD-i)
Power Unlimited	80% (CD-i)

Pac-Attack was met with a divided response from critics; while some praised its simplistic gameplay, colorful graphics, and unique usage of Pac-Man characters, others criticized its lack of replay value and inferior quality to other puzzle games available, notably Dr. Mario and Tetris. The Sega Genesis version has a 70% rating on aggregator site GameRankings, while the SNES version has a 66%.

Electronic Gaming Monthly stated that the Game Gear version was "the type of puzzle game designed for Game Gear" for its addictiveness and simplistic gameplay, while GamePro found the Genesis version's multiplayer to be the game's main selling point. GameFan was the most positive towards it in their review, favorably comparing it to Tetris for its addictiveness, multiplayer modes and interesting premise for a puzzle game. Sega Visions magazine liked the Game Gear's portability and interesting usage of the Pac-Man character, saying that it was "sure to keep you busy." In a 1998 retrospective review, AllGame stated that the Game Gear version's simplistic-yet-addictive gameplay, multiplayer mode and clever usage of the Pac-Man gameplay made Pac-Attack one of the best titles for the system. Reviewing the iOS "demake", TouchArcade especially praised the game's Puzzle Mode for its unique gameplay, while also liking the game's "sharp" graphics and responsive controls. Power Unlimited gave the CD-i version a score of 80% summarizing: "The graphics are clear, the music is nice and the controls are excellent."

Total!! UK Magazine was particularly negative towards the game, calling it a "loser" for its similarity to games such as Tetris and "tedious" single-player mode. Japanese publication Famitsu stated that the game was not as refined as titles such as Tetris or Dr. Mario, criticizing its gameplay for being bland and not having much replay value. Reviewing the Wii Virtual Console release of the SNES port, Eurogamer stated that the game's lack of depth and simplistic gameplay made it a hard sell compared to other similar falling-tile games on the market. IGN had a similar response, saying that players should instead wait for other similar games to hit the Wii Shop Channel for its frustrating gameplay and lack of replay value. In a retrospective review, Hardcore Gaming 101 found the game inferior to other puzzle titles such as Dr. Mario and Dr. Robotnik's Mean Bean Machine, saying the multiplayer mode and gameplay became repetitive after a while, saying that the Puzzle Mode was the only part that had any replay value.
