= Jr. Pac-Man =

1983 video game

- Arcade flyer
- Developer: General Computer Corporation
- Publisher: Bally Midway
- Designer: Tim Hoskins
- Series: Pac-Man
- Platforms: Arcade, Atari 2600, Commodore 64, MS-DOS
- Release: December 1983: Arcade; NA: December 1983 2600; NA: October 1986 MS-DOS; NA: 1988 C64; NA: 1988
- Genre: Maze
- Modes: Single-player, multiplayer
- Arcade system: Namco Pac-Man

Jr. Pac-Man is an arcade video game developed by General Computer Corporation and released by Bally Midway in 1983. It has the same gameplay as prior entries in the Pac-Man series, but the maze scrolls horizontally and has no escape tunnels. Unlike previous Pac-Man games, the bonus item moves around the maze. It changes dots into a form that slows Jr. Pac-Man as they are being eaten and can also destroy power pellets.

== Gameplay ==
Title screen

The core gameplay of Jr. Pac-Man is similar to its predecessors. The player controls the eponymous Jr. Pac-Man (who wears an animated propeller beanie), and scores points by eating all of the dots in the maze, while four ghosts (Blinky, Pinky, Inky, and Tim, who replaces Clyde) chase him around the maze and attempt to catch him. Eating a power pellet turns the ghosts blue, briefly allowing the player to eat them for extra points. Once the maze is cleared, a new maze is presented and the gameplay continues.

The mazes are now twice the width of the monitor and scroll horizontally. A total of seven mazes appear throughout the game, and five of them have six power pellets instead of four, but none of them have tunnels that wrap around from one side of the screen to the other.

Bonus items (such as tricycles, kites, and balloons) appear in each round, starting above the ghosts' lair and moving around the maze as in Ms. Pac-Man. As an item encounters dots, it changes them into larger ones that award more points but slow Jr. Pac-Man down more than regular dots while he is eating them. After a certain length of time, the item will move toward one of the remaining power pellets (if any) and explode on contact if not eaten, destroying both itself and the pellet. Contact between Jr. Pac-Man and a non-vulnerable ghost costs the player one life and makes any large dots either disappear or revert to normal ones, depending on how many dots overall are left in the maze.

The between-level intermissions show the developing relationship between Jr. Pac-Man and a small red ghost named Yum-Yum who is apparently the daughter of Blinky.

== Development ==
Tim Hoskins worked at General Computer Corporation (GCC) as Jr. Pac-Man's project lead. Hoskins recalled that GCC's founder Doug Macrae came up with the idea, referring to the game as Pac-Baby in his project notes. Macrae echoed this, adding that "Junior Arriving" had been an intermission scene in Ms. Pac-Man. As Pac-Man and Ms. Pac-Man were what Macrae described as "huge successes", the company continued with the series. During this period in arcade development, they had the option to develop the game as a new arcade cabinet or implement a new hardware kit. Macrae had a plan to edit the original Pac-Man kits, implementing horizontal scrolling and changing the collectible fruits to toys.

Just like with Ms. Pac-Man, there was no source code available to the team to develop the game, requiring the team to reverse-engineer Pac-Man from ROM dumps. Unlike Ms. Pac-Man, which was developed in a few weeks, Jr. Pac-Man took months to make. The scrolling play area led to difficulties handling off-screen objects, such as the ghosts. When investigating the Pac-Man ROM, the developers found unused elements such as a "fat dot" and another that resembled a flame, inspiring features in the new game. They introduced a fat dot that slowed the player down more than regular dots when Jr. Pac-Man ate them but that was worth more points. For the bouncing toys, they thought of the flame items they discovered and decided to implement an explosion when the fat dot interacted with a power pellet, giving the player urgency to collect the toy item before risking losing a power pellet. Upon the player's death, the fat dots would vanish, rewarding skilled players who avoided losing them except at the very end of a level.

The team also adjusted graphics from the original game, giving Jr. Pac-Man a twirling beanie-cap and giving the game a lower-case font. The group experimented with several ways to show the characters death-sequence, eventually settling on having him shrink down only leaving his beanie-cap. Earlier experiments were coarser, including having Jr. Pac-Man pause then slowly ooze a red substance before the top of his body fell off. The team described creating the new intermissions as difficult, involving creating new graphics and software to drive them.

The game would be the final Pac-Man game made by GCC. Hoskins envisioned other ideas to potentially make as a follow-up, such as a Pac-Man game from a first-person perspective, but this was never made.

== Ports ==
The Atari 2600 version of the game was programmed in 1984 by Ava Robin-Cohen of GCC. The game was not released until 1986 when the Atari 2600 was experiencing what game historian Brett Weiss described as "a resurgence of sorts" after Nintendo had success in the marketplace with the Nintendo Entertainment System. Atari had just re-released the system as a smaller budget-priced revision in 1986. Jr. Pac-Man was released for the Atari 2600 in October 1986.

Ports for the Atari 5200 and the Atari 8-bit computers were finished in 1984, but were scrapped along with Super Pac-Man when the home divisions of Atari were sold to Jack Tramiel.

An unofficial port for the Atari 7800 was published in 2009 by AtariAge.
