= Pac 'n Roll =

2005 video game

- Developer: Namco
- Publisher: Namco
- Series: Pac-Man
- Platform: Nintendo DS
- Release: JP: July 28, 2005; NA: August 23, 2005; EU: October 28, 2005; AU: November 3, 2005
- Genre: Puzzle platformer
- Mode: Single-player

Pac 'n Roll (Note: Japanese: パックンロール, Hepburn: Pakku n Rōru) is a 2005 puzzle platformer video game developed and published by Namco for the Nintendo DS. The player is tasked with controlling Pac-Man through different levels, with its controls centered around using the touch screen. The harder the player swipes on the screen, the faster Pac-Man goes in the respective direction. In each level, the player must navigate Pac-Man from the beginning to the end while dodging different obstacles, such as ghosts, and collecting enough "pellets" to unlock the next area. The game also features boss fights and additional unlockable challenges on each stage.

The game was first showcased at E3 2004 as one of the first games showcased for the then-newly announced Nintendo DS. It was then formally announced in early 2005 and released throughout the latter part of that year, starting with July 28, 2005 in Japan. It received mixed reviews from critics, who were generally positive of the gameplay mechanics, but divided on its difficulty and depth, and generally criticized the story. It was later re-released as Pac 'n Roll Remix, a remake originally included as part of the Namco Museum Remix compilation for the Wii in 2007. Pac 'n Roll Remix was later included as part of Pac-Man Museum+, another video game compilation that was released for several platforms in 2022.

== Gameplay ==
The player moves Pac-Man on the top screen by swiping and moving the model of Pac-Man on the bottom screen.

Pac 'n Roll is a single-player puzzle platformer game. It has the player controls Pac-Man via the bottom touch screen of the Nintendo DS, with a control scheme similar to that of a trackball. The harder or the more the player swipes the screen, the faster Pac-Man goes in the direction the player swiped. Harder, abrupt strokes allow Pac-Man to quickly dash, and simply tapping the middle of the screen will cause Pac-Man to immediately stop. The game features two power-ups that adjust Pac-Man's control scheme: a suit of armor that allows Pac-Man to sink to the bottom of flooded areas and break open metal crates at the cost of making him harder to move, and a feather cap that makes him lighter and able to fly over short distances.

In each level, the player must navigate Pac-Man from the beginning to the end while traversing platforming sections, avoiding ghosts and other obstacles, and collecting pellets. Levels are further divided into several enclosed areas, which require the player to collect to a certain amount of pellets in order to unlock. The player can also find unique "power pellets" that allow Pac-Man to consume ghosts that would otherwise damage and eventually kill him. While the player is not required to find every power pellet in a level, doing so will award the player with a perfect "rating" on that stage. There are about thirty stages spread across six main worlds. The last level of every world contains a boss fight, which is then followed by a cutscene that explains the plot up to that point.

Every non-boss level features additional challenges for the player to complete. These include time trials, collecting a series of hidden objects, defeating a certain amount of ghosts within a specified amount of a time, or completing the stage without eating a single pellet. These challenges are unlocked by finding hidden gems within other stages. A bonus seventh world, consisting of mainly challenge stages and a special unlockable stage that lets the player play the original Pac-Man game, is also featured.

== Plot ==
Pac 'n Roll takes place during Pac-Man's youth, where he spends a summer at the home of Pac-Master, who serves as his tutor. During Pac-Man's training, Pac-Master's family goes to the Power Pellet Harvest Festival with Pac-Man. During the family's trip, the Ghosts, plotting a way to kill Pac-Master and his family, decide to summon Golvis, a ghost that was considered so powerful that he was banished to space. Golvis then interrupts the festival and, despite Pac-Master's efforts to stop him, turns all residents of Pac-Land, including Pac-Master's family, into balls with the assistance of his sentient guitar, Jack. He then kidnaps all of Pac-Master's family except for Pac-Man, who is saved by his guardian fairy, Krystal.

Pac-Man travels across Pac-Land to save Pac-Master's family from Golvis, freeing them one by one. After saving most of them, Golvis attempts to strike Pac-Man from his UFO; Pac-Man and Krystal give chase to Golvis to his UFO and defeat him one last time. Afterwards, Pac-Man and Krystal escapes from Golvis' crashing UFO alongside Pac-Master. With Golvis defeated, Golvis' curse on the people of Pac-Land is broken, restoring the Pac-Man and his friends back to their original forms. The people of Pac-Land hail Pac-Man as a celebrity for his heroic acts. Meanwhile, Golvis, Jack and the ghosts eventually end up stranded in an unknown ocean. The ghosts condemn Golvis for his actions, while Jack reveals that the reason why Golvis was sent away into space was due to his clumsiness, not his strength.

== Release ==
Pac 'n Roll was both developed and published by Namco. It was first showcased at E3 2004 alongside another Pac-Man game, Pac-Pix. It was one of several games announced for the then newly revealed Nintendo DS, and was featured as a playable demo at the convention. A formal announcement occurred in April 2005, followed by another showcase and playable demo at E3 2005. The game was first released on July 28, 2005 in Japan, and was followed up with a North American release on August 23, Europe on October 28, and Australia on November 3. The game was included as a prize for a sweepstakes hosted by Nintendo Power in September 2005. Winners of the contest were able to win a copy of Pac 'n Roll, as well as every other Pac-Man game released that year. Nintendo handled co-publication and distribution of the title in Europe on behalf of Namco's European branch.

A remake of Pac 'n Roll, titled Pac 'n Roll Remix, was included as part of the Namco Museum Remix video game compilation, which was released on October 23, 2007 for the Wii. The remake features a different control scheme from the original due to the Wii's lack of touch screen functionality: Pac-Man himself is controlled with the Wii Nunchuk's analog stick and boosting is remapped to having the player flick the Wii Remote itself. It also features challenges for the player to complete, as well as completion times. The collection itself is built around Pac 'n Roll Remix, with the player controlling the game's version of Pac-Man to find and select games to play. It was also included as part of the expanded version of the compilation, Namco Museum Megamix, which was released on November 16, 2010. Pac 'n Roll Remix was later re-released as part of Pac-Man Museum+, another compilation that was released in 2022 for Nintendo Switch, PlayStation 4, Xbox One, and PC via Steam.

== Reception ==
Reception

Aggregate score
Aggregator	Score
Metacritic	72/100

Review scores
Publication	Score
1Up.com	B
Edge	6/10
Eurogamer	7/10
Famitsu	29/40
Game Informer	6/10
GameSpot	7.1/10
Hyper	72/100
IGN	8/10
Nintendo Life	7/10
Nintendo World Report	8/10

Pac 'n Roll received mixed or average reviews from critics. On review aggregator website Metacritic, it holds a score of 72 out of 100 based on 35 critic reviews. On Famitsu, four critics assigned the game an average score of 29 out of 40.

The gameplay was generally received well, with many praising its design and controls, though some felt that it lacked depth. Craig Harris of IGN described it as well designed and a good fit for the handheld gaming market. Thomas Bowskill of Nintendo Life described it as addicting and "perfect for casual play" based on its simple, short levels controls that he believed were easy to understand. John Walker of Eurogamer shared similar thoughts, though felt that it lacked enough elements to become a "grandiose of a gaming classic". A reviewer for Game Informer believed that, while unique and unlike other games at the time, it lacked depth and variation. Bob Colayco of GameSpot and a reviewer for Edge felt similarly, with the former feeling that while the game made good usage of the Nintendo DS, it lacked depth.

Some reviewers criticized level design and difficulty, believing that the level of difficulty increased too drastically near the end. Shane Bettenhausen of 1UP.com described the late game as "weirdly difficult and frustrating", highlighting a specific stage that had "nearly impossible jumps and wildly oscillating platforms". Walker described the difficulty as going from relatively easy from the fourth world to "smack face first into a wall". Colayco also highlighted the sharp difficulty increase during the latter levels, but didn't believe that it ever became too difficult. Edge believed that the latter levels were among the most creative that the game had to offer, though felt that it didn't properly prepare the player for their difficulty. Mike Sklens of Nintendo World Report felt that it wasn't challenging enough, even when acknowledging the difficulty increase during the latter portion, stating that it "never quite gets to the point of being truly difficult".

Many had generally negative opinions of the story. Bettenhausen said that the story would bore any player that was old enough to understand the cutscenes. Walker believed that it shouldn't have had a story at all, describing it as atrocious and that no explanation needed to be given as to why Pac-Man was collecting dots, likening to the original Pac-Man game, which lacked a story. Bowskill shared similar thoughts as Bettenhausen and Walker, finding the story to not be interesting or necessary. He further criticized the sound effects that was used to illustrate the voices of the game's characters, describing them as irritating. Sklens felt that the story was too short, while a reviewer for Hyper said that it was insipid.
