= Pac-Pix =

2005 video game

- North American cover art
- Developer: Namco
- Publishers: JP: Namco; NA: Namco Hometek; EU: Namco Europe/Nintendo
- Director: Tetsuya Shinoda
- Producer: Hideo Yoshizawa
- Designers: Yoshinori Naoi; Yoshiya Tanaka
- Series: Pac-Man
- Platform: Nintendo DS
- Release: JP: March 10, 2005; NA: April 26, 2005; AU: May 8, 2005; EU: May 20, 2005; KOR: November 15, 2007
- Genre: Action
- Mode: Single-player

Pac-Pix (パックピクス) is a 2005 action video game in the Pac-Man series, developed and published by Namco for the Nintendo DS. As the first home Pac-Man video game to use motion controls, it involves using the Nintendo DS's touchscreen to draw Pac-Men and guiding them to eat all the ghosts on each page by using various gestures.

Pac-Pix was originally conceived as an arcade game by director Tetsuya Shinoda four years prior. With inspiration from Apple personal digital assistants (PDAs) correcting text with a tiny puff, he found this type of control intuitive and wanted to implement it into a game. Two years later, the creators pitched the idea as a tablet computer and PDA game, but found the game and the target audience for such hardware did not match. When the DS was announced, Yoshizawa stated that "the time was right".

Upon release, the game received mixed to positive reviews.

== Gameplay ==
The player uses the stylus to draw Pac-Men, and guide them through each level. Each Pac-Man can eat ghosts when drawn facing them, and can be guided by drawing walls, with the Pac-Man following the direction of the drawn wall when colliding with it. The Pac-Men can also be held back or dragged backwards by repeatedly striking the Pac-Man backwards from its current direction. The size of the hand-drawn Pac-Man will also adjust its speed accordingly (Larger Pac-Men move slower, while smaller ones move faster). Only up to three Pac-Men can be present on screen at once; the oldest surviving Pac-Man will disappear if a Pac-Man is created while there are three Pac-Men on screen. Pac-Men will disappear if they move off screen or bounce of solid objects too fast.

After reaching specific points in the game, other gestures are unlocked, including the ability to shoot arrows and the ability to create bombs. Arrows allow the player to hit objects such as buttons on the top and bottom screens, as well as being able to stun ghosts. Bombs allow the player to cause explosions by connecting bomb fuses to light candles; the explosions are capable of destroying certain walls, shielded ghosts, and can also stun ghosts. The explosion will also render the player unable to draw around the explosion radius for a period of time. The unlocked gestures can only be used within the later chapters.

The game is split up into levels (referred to as "pages"), which are part of multiple "chapters"; all pages in a single chapter must be completed in one sitting. Each page has a time limit, and a limited amount of usable Pac-Men. The general objective is to eat all of the ghosts on-screen with minimal Pac-Men used as fast as possible, with each page's ghosts arriving in two waves. Various different types of ghosts appear, such as the blue ghosts being able to move quickly as the Pac-Men approach, the yellow ghosts spilling colored ink; preventing the player from drawing on top of the ink, the white ghosts being able to quickly move across the screen, and orange ghosts that need to be eaten in an order marked on their bodies. Each page features various gimmicks that require the player to perform certain gestures, such as popping bubbles, activating buttons to unlock gates and light candles, mirrors that make arrows bounce to another direction and walls that make Pac-Men bounce off to the other direction. There is a "safe tunnel" located at the top of every page (except boss battle pages), which allows Pac-Men to travel safely across the top of the screen, additionally eating ghosts and the bonus fruits/items that appear. The player fails the chapter if they run out of Pac-Men or time on a page and must start it over from the beginning. The game features 12 chapters containing 5 pages. Even number chapters feature a sixth page, where a boss fight occurs. When a page is completed. the amount of remaining time and remaining Pac-Men is tallied up for a bonus score. A score rank is given depending on how much the player has scored at the end of a chapter. An extra "second book", featuring faster moving ghosts and alternative ghost placements is unlocked after finishing the game, which also contains 12 chapters.

Completing chapters with S to B ranks awards the player with cards, which displays descriptions of the various characters and objects that appear in-game. The game also includes a practice mode, where the player can practice drawing gestures, where also extra gestures not available in the normal modes can be used.

== Plot ==
A wizard invents a substance named Ghost Ink, which creates mischievous-acting ghosts when used. The ink ghosts created by the Ghost Ink cause chaos to the people of Pac-Man's world by jumping into different books and pictures across the world.

Hearing of the crisis, Pac-Man uses his Magic Pen to rid the world of the ink ghosts. Pac-Man succeeds in trapping all the ghosts into a single book, which was then promptly locked. Before he could succeed in turning all the ghosts back into ghost ink, the ghosts counterattack Pac-Man with a curse, which captures him in a sheet of paper. Pac-Man enlists the help of the player to use the Magic Pen to rid the books of the Ghosts. The player uses the Magic Pen to rid the pages from the ghosts by drawing Pac-Men.

Eventually, the player gets towards battling the Ink Master, the source of the Ghost Ink. The Ink Master is eventually defeated, and is sealed inside a bottle. With the ink ghosts gone, the curse induced on Pac-Man is undone and is freed from the paper sheet. Pac-Man seals the bottle in a chest and hides it in the unknown sea, freeing the people of Pac-Man's world from the ink ghosts.

== Development ==
Pac-Pix was developed and published by Namco. The game was debuted at the Electronic Entertainment Expo (E3) in 2004 as a technology demonstration for the newly unveiled Nintendo DS hardware. According to producer Hideo Yoshizawa, Pac-Pix was conceived as an arcade game by director Tetsuya Shinoda four years prior. Using Apple personal digital assistants (PDAs), Shinoda noticed how corrected text would disappear with a tiny puff of smoke when crossed out by the user; he found this type of control intuitive and wanted to implement it into a game. Two years later, the creators pitched the idea as a tablet computer and PDA game, but found the game and the target audience for such hardware did not match. When the DS was announced, Yoshizawa stated that "the time was right". The E3 demo Pac-Pix was met with praise from people within the video game industry, many of which requested it be made into a full game. Namco obliged by putting together a development team, which implemented more effective use of the hardware's two screens. According to Yoshizawa, the most difficult aspect of production on Pac-Pix was allowing the player to determine size, shape, and place of their own sketches within the gameplay environment.

=== Release ===
The game was first released in Japan on March 20, 2005, and was released in North America by Namco Hometek on April 26. Nintendo co-published and distributed the game in Europe on behalf of Namco's European branch, and released it on May 20.

== Reception ==
Reception

Aggregate score
Aggregator	Score
Metacritic	71/100

Review scores
Publication	Score
Eurogamer	6/10
GameRevolution	4/10
GameSpot	6.9/10
IGN	8/10
Nintendo Life	7/10
Nintendo World Report	7/10

== See also ==
- Pac 'n Roll - Another Pac-Man game developed by Namco for the Nintendo DS that was released on the same year.
