= Baby Pac-Man =

1982 video game

- Arcade flyer
- Developer: Bally Midway
- Publisher: Bally Midway
- Designer: Claude Fernandez
- Artists: Margaret Hudson, Pat McMahon
- Series: Pac-Man
- Platform: Arcade
- Release: October 11, 1982
- Genres: Maze, pinball
- Modes: Up to 2 players, alternating turns

Baby Pac-Man is a hybrid maze game and pinball game released in arcades by Bally Midway on October 11, 1982, nine months after the release of Ms. Pac-Man. 7,000 units were produced.

== Design ==
It is the first video/pinball hybrid game produced by Bally. The cabinet consists of a 13-inch video screen seated above a shortened, horizontal pinball table. The combination fits into roughly the same size space as an upright arcade machine.

Unlike on most pinball machines there are no outlanes, so the ball can only be lost in the gap between the flippers.

== Gameplay ==
Play begins on the video screen, where the player controls Baby Pac-Man through a maze. Play mechanics are similar to Pac-Man in that the object is to navigate the maze while gobbling dots and avoiding ghosts. In contrast to earlier games in the series, Baby Pac-Man's maze starts with no energizers, which allow Baby Pac-Man to eat the ghosts. Instead, there are two vertical chutes at the bottom edge of the screen, which suspend video play and transfer the game to the pinball table located just below the monitor when the player travels down either of them.

=== Pinball mode ===
The mechanical pinball section operates as a traditional, though smaller, pinball table. The player hits targets with a metal ball using two button-operated flippers. The player may earn energizers, gain new fruit bonuses, and increase tunnel speed, all of which are used in the video mode. After losing a ball, the game resumes on the video screen, but with the chutes closed. The player must clear the maze or lose a life to reopen the chutes. The game ends when the player runs out of lives.

== Reception ==
In a retrospective, GameRoom said the game had been a big hit, due more to the appeal of the character than the gameplay.
