= Ms. Pac-Man Maze Madness =

2000 video game

- North American PlayStation cover art
- Developer: Namco Hometek (Note: Ported to Nintendo 64 and Dreamcast by Mass Media and developed on the Game Boy Advance by Full Fat.)
- Publishers: NA: Namco Hometek; JP: Namco; EU: Sony Computer Entertainment (PS); EU: Zoo Digital Publishing (GBA)
- Producers: Ed Woolf; Mike Lescault
- Programmers: Jeff Hall; Gil Colgate
- Composer: Jon Holland
- Series: Pac-Man
- Platforms: PlayStation, Nintendo 64, Dreamcast, Game Boy Advance
- Release: PlayStation: NA: September 13, 2000; PAL: November 17, 2000; JP: December 28, 2000; Nintendo 64, Dreamcast: NA: November 13, 2000; Game Boy Advance: NA: November 3, 2004; PAL: November 19, 2004
- Genre: Maze
- Modes: Single-player, multiplayer

Ms. Pac-Man Maze Madness (Note: Japanese: ミズパックマン メイズマッドネス, Hepburn: Mizu PakkuMan Meizu Maddonesu) is a 2000 maze video game developed and published by Namco Hometek for the PlayStation. It was later released for the Nintendo 64, Dreamcast, and Game Boy Advance. A remake of General Computer Corporation's Ms. Pac-Man (1982), players control the titular character in her quest to stop a witch named Mesmerelda from stealing the Gems of Virtue. The game was well-received upon release, with critics applauding its simplicity and faithfulness to the arcade original. A sequel was in development around 2006 but was cancelled for unknown reasons. The player must navigate a series of mazes, encountering obstacles such as moving blocks, exploding boxes, and locked doors.

== Gameplay ==
The player must navigate a series of mazes with Ms. Pac-Man. Along the way, she encounters such obstacles as moving blocks, exploding boxes, and locked doors. To help her, there is 'Pac-Dot Radar' to locate missing dots the player will need before being allowed to reach the next section of a level. Placed about the maze are such devices as spring tiles (to jump over the walls of the maze, and sometimes on top of them); switches, keys, hearts to regain her health, and 'Power Pellets' used to allow Ms. Pac-Man to eat all the enemies in the area for a limited time.

As the player progresses, they must eat yellow dots scattered about each area, once they have eaten enough of these, a door will open, allowing them to reach a new section of that area. Each area has its own number of dots, as well as snacks such as fruit and pretzels. If the player can get all of these, as well as reaching the exit of the areas, they are rewarded with a 'Gold Star'. Once an area is beaten, the player can also play it again for a Time Trial, 'Gold Star', and 'Gold Clock'. Earning enough stars will unlock various features such as 'Bonus Rounds' between some levels, and a 'Movie Player' to watch the game's animated scenes.

Each enemy and item that the player eats gives them more points, which can earn them additional lives, as well as allow them to unlock other features. After beating the two in-game bosses (the green 'Gobblin' and the final boss 'Mesmerelda'), the player receives the 'Witch's Key' which allows them to unlock various locations in the earlier areas. However, the game requires the player to beat the bosses twice in order to see the game's ending. The multiplayer mode allows up to 4 people to play simultaneously (although a player can play solo, verse three computer-controlled characters). The original arcade version of Ms. Pac-Man is freely playable as an option on the main menu, similar to how the original Pac-Man arcade game was freely available on the main menu of the 20th Anniversary Pac-Man World game. This was not included in the Game Boy Advance version.

== Plot ==
Professor Pac learns that the evil forces have taken control of the Enchanted Castle, using black magic. The princess has vanished, and a witch named Mesmerelda is planning on stealing all four Gems of Virtue (Generosity, Truth, Wisdom, and Courage) to control the "four wonders" (areas of Pac-Land). These four areas each have enemies in them, and are blocked by mysterious force fields. Professor Pac creates a device called the Pactrometer, which allows Ms. Pac-Man to go to these areas to recover the gems before Mesmerelda can get them first. However, as the Professor is telling Ms. Pac-Man this, he gets sucked into a mirror by the witch, leaving Ms. Pac-Man with the Pactrometer. As she journeys through the areas, she is helped by video messages that the Professor placed in the Pactrometer, and by holograms of Professor Pac.

As Ms. Pac-Man gathers the last of the gems, they are stolen by Mesmerelda. A battle ensues and the witch is defeated and runs away, leaving behind a key. Without the key, Mesmerelda is unable to get into the castle to reach her crystal ball, and thus cannot use the gems.

Ms. Pac-Man returns to fight for the gems, and this time wins, regaining the gems. With them and the Pactrometer, the witch's spell is broken, and Mesmerelda returns to her true form as the princess. Professor Pac, Ms. Pac-Man, and the princess proceed to celebrate their victory.

== Other Ms. Pac-Man games ==
The original Ms. Pac-Man was produced in 1981 and released on February 3, 1982, as an arcade game by Midway Games.

A year after Ms. Pac-Man Maze Madness was released, Ms. Pac-Man: Quest for the Golden Maze was released on PC. While similar in gameplay to Maze Madness, the game includes new elements such as a baby ghost, which causes power-ups to appear when touched, and bonus areas where fruit must be eaten in order to obtain a golden fruit. It was the third and final game that was released starring Ms. Pac Man.

== Reception ==
Reception

Aggregate scores
Aggregator	Score			
Aggregator	Dreamcast	GBA	N64	PS
GameRankings	72%	55%	74%	80%
Metacritic	73/100	63/100	73/100	N/A

Review scores
Publication	Score			
Publication	Dreamcast	GBA	N64	PS
AllGame	3.5/5	N/A	4/5	4/5
CNET Gamecenter	7/10	N/A	N/A	N/A
Electronic Gaming Monthly	8.5/10	N/A	8.17/10 (Note: In Electronic Gaming Monthly's review of the Nintendo 64 version, one critic gave it a score of 8.5/10, and the rest gave it each a score of 8/10.)	8.5/10
EP Daily	7.5/10	N/A	N/A	N/A
Famitsu	N/A	N/A	N/A	23/40
Game Informer	8/10	N/A	7.5/10	8.25/10
GameFan	N/A	N/A	81/100, 82/100, 72/100 (Note: In GameFan's review of the Nintendo 64 version, three critics gave it scores out of 100)	(G.H.) 89% 83/100, 84/100, 80/100 (Note: In GameFan's review of the PlayStation version, three critics gave it each a score out of 100.)
GameSpot	6.9/10	6.5/10	6.8/10	6.5/10
IGN	7.6/10	N/A	7.5/10	8.3/10
N64 Magazine	N/A	N/A	72%	N/A
Next Generation	N/A	N/A	3/5	3/5
Nintendo Power	N/A	3.2/5	8.3/10	N/A
Official U.S. PlayStation Magazine	N/A	N/A	N/A	4/5
Retro Gamer	N/A	77%	N/A	N/A

The Dreamcast, Game Boy Advance, and Nintendo 64 versions received "mixed or average reviews" according to the review aggregation website Metacritic. Nintendo Power said of the N64 version, "The multiplayer mode stumbles," while N64 Magazine gave it a much harsher description: "The Multiplayer mazes are viewed from three-quarters angle — and the blurry visuals make it all but impossible to see what's going on." They also continue comparing the tag games as being "ruined by the fact that the chasers move twice as fast as the other players." Their final comment on the multiplayer mode was simply "Terrible." In Japan, Famitsu gave the PlayStation version a score of 23 out of 40. Game Informer gave the same console version a favorable review over a month before it was released Stateside.

Chris Charla of NextGen said of the PlayStation version in its December 2000 issue: "The maze format makes the game too limited to be the next Ape Escape, but it's definitely worth a look." Later, in its January 2001 issue, Daniel Erickson called the N64 version "A solid package for just about any gamer."

Reviewing the Game Boy Advance version of the game, Retro Gamer generally complimented the graphics, sound and gameplay while stating it as difficult to see the heights of some platforms and noted that the game difficulty was perhaps too lenient suggesting it for younger players.

Bad Hare of GamePro said of the PlayStation version in its October 2000 issue, "With three frantic multiplayer modes as well as the original arcade classics, Maze Madness proves the ol' girl still has life in her." (Note: GamePro gave the PlayStation version two 4/5 scores for graphics and control, and two 3.5/5 scores for sound and fun factor.) Four issues later, however, Human Tornado said that the Dreamcast version "isn't a very strong Pac game, but it does have its moments. If you're hungry for some ghosts, this game might be worth a trip around the maze." (Note: GamePro gave the Dreamcast version 3/5 for graphics, sound, control, and fun factor.)

The game was a runner-up for the "Best Multiplayer Game" award at the Official U.S. PlayStation Magazine 2000 Editors' Awards, which went to TimeSplitters.

== See also ==
- Ms. Pac-Man
- Ms. Pac-Man: Quest for the Golden Maze
