= List of Bandai Namco video game compilations =

List of all video game compilations by Bandai Namco Holdings

Bandai Namco Holdings is a Japanese holdings company that specializes in video games, toys, arcades, anime and amusement parks, and is headquartered in Minato-ku, Tokyo. They were formed after the merge of Namco and Bandai on 29 September 2005, with both companies' assets being merged into a single corporate entity. The video game branch of the company is Bandai Namco Entertainment, producing games for home consoles, arcade hardware and mobile phones. Bandai Namco creates several highly successful video game franchises, including Tekken, Pac-Man, Gundam and Tales, as is Japan's third largest video game company and the seventh in the world by revenue, as well as the largest toy company in the world by 2017.

Since 1990, Bandai Namco has produced many compilations containing their games, notably their arcade titles from the 1970s and 1980s, for various home video game systems, handhelds, personal computers and arcade boards. Out of these compilations, the Namco Museum series has been the most successful, selling a total of 9.113 million copies total across all platforms. (Note: Namco Museum series: Namco Museum Vol. 1 sales: 1.65 million units; Namco Museum Vol. 3 sales: 2.24 million units; Namco Museum 64 sales: 1.04 million units; Namco Museum (GBA) sales: 2.96 million units; Namco Museum (PS2) sales: ≈1.80 million units; Namco Museum Battle Collection Japan sales: 79,527 units; Namco Museum Vol. 2 (PSP) sales: 24,934 units; Namco Museum DS Japan sales: 33,393 units; Namco Museum Virtual Arcade Japan sales (first week): 5,912 units) Some of these compilations would be outsourced to other game developers, including Microsoft, Mass Media, Digital Eclipse, M2, and Cattle Call.

== List of compilations ==
Title	Original release date		
Title	Japan	North America	PAL region
Disk NG 1	9 March 1990	none	none
Notes: Released for the MSX2; Includes King & Balloon, Tank Battalion, Warp & Warp, Galaga, Bosconian and XVM the last of which is exclusive to this compilation
Disk NG 2	26 April 1990	none	none
Notes: Released for the MSX2; Includes Galaxian, Pac-Man, Rally-X, Dig Dug, Mappy and SHM, the last of which is exclusive to this compilation
Galaxian & Galaga	14 July 1995	26 June 1996	1995
Notes: Released for the Game Boy; Includes Galaxian and Galaga; Published by Nintendo outside Japan
Namco Museum Vol. 1	22 November 1995	31 July 1996	17 August 1996
Notes: Released for the PlayStation; Includes Pac-Man, Rally-X, New Rally-X, Bosconian, Galaga, Pole Position and Toy Pop; Features a 3D virtual museum that the player can walk around and interact with; One of the first PlayStation video game compilations, alongside Williams Arcade's Greatest Hits
Namco Classic Collection Vol. 1	November 1995	1995	1995
Notes: Released for arcades, running on the Namco ND-1 hardware; Includes Galaga, Xevious, Super Xevious and Mappy, alongside remade "arrangement" versions of such
Namco Classic Collection Vol. 2	March 1996	1996	1996
Notes: Released for arcades, running on the Namco ND-1 hardware; Includes Pac-Man, Rally-X, New Rally-X and Dig Dug, alongside remade "arrangement" versions of such
Namco Museum Vol. 2	9 February 1996	30 September 1996	22 November 1996
Notes: Released for the PlayStation; Includes Super Pac-Man, Xevious, Mappy, Gaplus, Grobda and Dragon Buster; The Japanese release replaces Super Pac-Man with Bomb Bee and Cutie Q; A special limited edition was released exclusively in Japan that included a paddle controller and replica promotional material for each of the games
Microsoft Return of Arcade	none	April 1996	none
Notes: Released for Windows 95; Includes Galaxian, Pac-Man, Dig Dug and Pole Position; Published by Microsoft as the second installment of the Microsoft Arcade series and the first to feature Namco games (The original Microsoft Arcade featured Atari games); Was given a re-release in 2000 that included Ms. Pac-Man, renamed Microsoft Return of Arcade Anniversary Edition
Namco Museum Vol. 3	21 June 1996	31 January 1997	12 February 1997
Notes: Released for the PlayStation; Includes Galaxian, Ms. Pac-Man, Dig Dug, Pole Position II, Phozon and The Tower of Druaga; Marks the first release of Ms. Pac-Man in Japan
Namco Gallery Vol. 1	21 July 1996	none	none
Notes: Released for the Game Boy; Includes Galaga, Mappy, Battle City and Namco Classic; Compatible with the Super Game Boy
Namco Museum Vol. 4	8 November 1996	30 June 1997	18 August 1997
Notes: Released for the PlayStation; Includes Pac-Land, The Return of Ishtar, Genpei Toma Den, Assault, Assault Plus and Ordyne; Assault Plus can be unlocked via a cheat code; Genpei Toma Den was renamed to The Genji and the Heike Clans in international releases
Namco Gallery Vol. 2	29 November 1996	none	none
Notes: Released for the Game Boy; Includes Galaxian, Dig Dug, The Tower of Druaga and Famista 4; Compatible with the Super Game Boy
Arcade Classics	none	none	1996
Notes: Released for the Philips CD-i; Includes Galaxian, Galaga and Ms. Pac-Man; Not to be confused with the Sega Genesis game of the same title that includes Atari games
Namco Museum Vol. 5	28 February 1997	26 November 1997	26 February 1998
Notes: Released for the PlayStation; Includes Baraduke, Metro-Cross, Pac-Mania, Dragon Spirit and Valkyrie no Densetsu; Valkyrie no Densetsu was retitled The Legend of Valkyrie in international releases; The last Namco Museum compilation released for the console in North America and Europe
Xevious 3D/G+	28 March 1997	30 June 1997	1997
Notes: Released for the PlayStation; Includes Xevious, Super Xevious, Xevious Arrangement and Xevious 3D/G
Namco History Vol. 1	25 April 1997	none	none
Notes: Released for Windows 95; Includes Xevious, Super Xevious, Mappy, Motos and Toy Pop
Namco Gallery Vol. 3	25 July 1997	none	none
Notes: Released for the Game Boy; Includes Sky Kid, The Tower of Babel, Family Tennis and Jantaku Boy; Compatible with the Super Game Boy
Namco Museum Encore	30 October 1997	none	none
Notes: Released for the PlayStation; Includes King & Balloon, Motos, Sky Kid, Rolling Thunder, Wonder Momo, Rompers and Dragon Saber; Was the last Namco Museum game released for the console
Namco History Vol. 2	28 November 1997	none	none
Notes: Released for Windows 95; Includes Tank Battalion, Rally-X, New Rally-X, Phozon, The Tower of Druaga and Grobda
Namco Anthology 1	4 June 1998	none	none
Notes: Released for the PlayStation; Includes Star Luster, The Tower of Babel, Conqueror's Continent and Wrestleball
Namco History Vol. 3	9 June 1998	none	none
Notes: Released for Windows 95; Includes Pac-Man, Ms. Pac-Man, Dig Dug, Super Pac-Man, Pac & Pal and Dig Dug II; Jr. Pac-Man is trademarked on the game's packaging, indicating it was to be included at one point
Namco Anthology 2	23 September 1998	none	none
Notes: Released for the PlayStation; Includes Valkyrie no Bōken: Toki no Kagi Densetsu, Namco Classic II, Pac-Attack and King of Kings
Microsoft Revenge of Arcade	none	October 1998	none
Notes: Released for Windows 95; Includes Rally-X, Ms. Pac-Man, Xevious, Mappy and Motos; Published by Microsoft as the third installment of the Microsoft Arcade series and the second to feature Namco games; Marks the first known appearance of the arcade version of Motos in North America
Namco History Vol. 4	4 December 1998	none	none
Notes: Released for Windows 95; Includes Galaxian, King & Balloon, Bosconian, Galaga, Warp & Warp and Gaplus
Namco Collection Vol. 1	2 April 1999	none	none
Notes: Released for Windows 98; Includes Sky Kid Deluxe, Final Lap and Valkyrie no Densetsu
Namco Collection Vol. 2	30 April 1999	none	none
Notes: Released for Windows 98; Includes Dragon Buster, Libble Rabble and Yokai Dochuki
Namco Museum 64	none	31 October 1999	none
Notes: Released for the Nintendo 64; Includes Galaxian, Pac-Man, Ms. Pac-Man, Galaga, Dig Dug and Pole Position; Developed by Mass Media
Pac-Man: Special Color Edition	none	November 1999	none
Notes: Released for the Game Boy Color; Includes Pac-Man and Pac-Attack; Made to celebrate the 20th anniversary of Pac-Man
Pac-Man Collection	11 January 2002	12 July 2001	7 December 2001
Notes: Released for the Game Boy Advance; Includes Pac-Man, Pac-Mania, Pac-Attack and Pac-Man Arrangement; Developed by Mass Media
Namco Museum	none	31 July 2000	none
Notes: Released for the Dreamcast; Includes the same titles as Namco Museum 64 with the addition of Pac-It, a mini-game playable on the Dreamcast VMU; Developed by Mass Media
Namco Museum	none	4 December 2001	none
Notes: Released for the Xbox, PlayStation 2 and GameCube; Includes Galaxian, Pac-Man, Galaga, Ms. Pac-Man, Dig Dug, Pole Position, Pole Position II, Pac-Mania, Pac-Attack, Galaga Arrangement, Pac-Man Arrangement and Dig Dug Arrangement; Developed by Mass Media
20 Year Reunion: Ms. Pac-Man/Galaga – Class of 1981	none	2001	none
Notes: Released for arcades; Includes Ms. Pac-Man and Galaga to celebrate both games' 20th anniversary; Pac-Man is included as a hidden game, and can be unlocked with a code
Gunvari Collection + Time Crisis	12 December 2002	none	none
Notes: Released for the PlayStation 2; Includes Time Crisis, Point Blank, Point Blank 2 and Point Blank 3; A version bundled with the Namco GunCon 2 was also released
Namco Vintage	none	6 November 2004	none
Notes: Released for the Xbox; Includes Galaga, Dig Dug and Pole Position; Could be purchased through the Xbox Live Arcade compilation disk
Game Densetsu	January 2005	none	none
Notes: Released for Windows XP; Includes demos for Mappy, The Tower of Druaga, Grobda, Motos and Dig Dug II; Released by Kabaya in packages of peppermint gum
Namco Museum Battle Collection	24 February 2005	23 August 2005	9 December 2005
Notes: Released for the PlayStation Portable; Includes Galaxian, Pac-Man, Rally-X, King & Balloon, New Rally-X, Bosconian, Galaga, Ms. Pac-Man, Dig Dug, Xevious, Mappy, The Tower of Druaga, Grobda, Motos, Dig Dug II, Dragon Buster and Rolling Thunder; Marks the first-ever appearance of Dig Dug II in Europe, as well as its first appearance in North America on a platform other than the NES.; The compilation also includes four "arrangement" versions of Pac-Man, New Rally-X, Galaga and Dig Dug – these are not the same as those found in the Namco Classic Collection series; The Japanese version, simply titled Namco Museum, contains less games found in the North America and European releases
NamCollection	21 July 2005	none	none
Notes: Released for the PlayStation 2; Includes Ridge Racer, Tekken, Klonoa: Door to Phantomile, Ace Combat 2 and Mr. Driller; Made to celebrate Namco's 50th anniversary
Namco Museum 50th Anniversary	26 January 2006	30 August 2005	31 March 2006
Notes: Released for the Xbox, GameCube, PlayStation 2, Windows and Game Boy Advance; Includes Galaxian, Pac-Man, Rally-X, Bosconian, Galaga, Ms. Pac-Man, Dig Dug, Pole Position, Pole Position II, Xevious, Mappy, Sky Kid, Pac-Mania, Galaga '88, Rolling Thunder and Dragon Spirit; Made to celebrate Namco's 50th anniversary; Known in Japan as Namco Museum Arcade HITS!; The North American and PAL versions feature five artists and songs popular in the 1980's, including "Come On Eileen" performed by the Dexy's Midnight Runners; The scaled-down GBA version includes Pac-Man, Rally-X, Galaga, Ms. Pac-Man and Dig Dug
Pac-Man 25th Anniversary	none	2005	none
Notes: Released for arcades; Includes Pac-Man, Galaga and Ms. Pac-Man; Made to celebrate the 25th anniversary of Pac-Man
Namco Museum Vol. 2	23 February 2006	none	none
Notes: Released for the PlayStation Portable; Includes King & Balloon, Bosconian, Xevious, Mappy, The Tower of Druaga, Grobda, Dragon Buster, Dig Dug II, Motos, Rolling Thunder and Dragon Spirit; Two new "arrangement" games are included, Pac-Man Arrangement Plus and Motos Arrangement
Namco Nostalgia 1	15 June 2006	none	none
Notes: Released as a "plug'n play" controller; Includes Xevious, Mappy, Xevious: Scramble Mission and Mappy: Revenge of Nyamco, the last two being exclusive to this compilation; Part of Bandai's Let's! TV Play Classic series
Namco Nostalgia 2	15 June 2006	none	none
Notes: Released as a "plug'n play" controller; Includes Gaplus, Dragon Buster, Gaplus Phanlax and Dragon Buster 100, the last two being exclusive to this compilation; Part of Bandai's Let's! TV Play Classic series
Namco Museum DS	11 October 2007	18 September 2007	22 February 2008
Notes: Released for the Nintendo DS; Includes Galaxian, Pac-Man, Galaga, Xevious, Mappy, The Tower of Druaga, Super Xevious, Dig Dug II and a remake of Pac-Man Vs.; Developed by M2
Namco Museum Remix	23 October 2007	6 December 2007	18 April 2008
Notes: Released for the Wii; Includes Cutie Q, Galaxian, Dig Dug, Super Pac-Man, Xevious, Mappy, Pac & Pal, Gaplus and Pac-Mania, as well as five remade "remix" versions of Rally-X, Galaga, Motos, Gator Panic and Pac 'n Roll; Known in Japan as Minna de Asobou! Namco Carnival (translated to English as Everybody Plays! Namco Carnival)
Namco Classic Fighter Collection	none	17 September 2008	none
Notes: Released for the PlayStation 2; Includes Soulcalibur II, Tekken 4 and Tekken Tag Tournament
Pac-Man Power Pack	none	17 September 2008	none
Notes: Released for the PlayStation 2; Includes Pac-Man World 2, Pac-Man World 3 and Pac-Man World Rally
Naruto: Ultimate Collection	none	17 September 2008	none
Notes: Released for the PlayStation 2; Includes Naruto: Ultimate Ninja, Naruto: Ultimate Ninja 2 and Naruto: Uzumaki Chronicles 2
Namco Museum Virtual Arcade	5 November 2009	4 November 2008	15 May 2009
Notes: Released for the Xbox 360; Includes Galaxian, Pac-Man, Rally-X, King & Balloon, New Rally-X, Bosconian, Galaga, Ms. Pac-Man, Dig Dug, Pole Position, Pole Position II, Super Pac-Man, Xevious, Mappy, Grobda, The Tower of Druaga, Dragon Buster, Motos, Baraduke, Dig Dug II, Sky Kid, Metro-Cross, Sky Kid Deluxe, Pac-Mania, Galaga '88, Dragon Spirit, Pac-Man Arrangement, Galaga Arrangement, Dig Dug Arrangement, Pac-Man Championship Edition, Galaga Legions and Mr. Driller Online; The Arrangement games are the same as those found in Namco Museum Battle Collection
Namco Museum Essentials	29 January 2009	22 July 2009	1 April 2010
Notes: Released for the PlayStation 3; Includes Pac-Man, Galaga, Dig Dug, Xevious, Dragon Spirit and Xevious Resurrection, the last of which being exclusive to this compilation; Supported the now-defunct PS Home service; Known in Japan as Namco Museum.comm; Delisted from the PS Store on 15 March 2018
Namco Games Portal	none	26 July 2010	none
Notes: Released for iOS devices; Includes Letter Labyrinth, Pac-Man Remix, Galaga Remix, Dig Dug Remix, Time Crisis: 2nd Strike and Ace Combat Xi: Skies of Incursion
Tales of Phantasia: Narikiri Dungeon X	5 August 2010	none	none
Notes: Released for the PlayStation Portable; Includes remakes of Tales of Phantasia and Tales of Phantasia X
Time Crisis: Razing Storm	21 October 2010	19 October 2010	5 November 2010
Notes: Released for the PlayStation 3; Includes Time Crisis 4, Razing Storm and Deadstorm Pirates; Known in Japan as Big 3 Gun Shooting; Supports the PlayStation Move peripheral
Namco Museum Megamix	none	16 November 2010	none
Notes: Released for the Wii; Updated version of Namco Museum Remix; Includes Cutie Q, Galaxian, Pac-Man, Rally-X, King & Balloon, New Rally-X, Bosconian, Galaga, Dig Dug, Super Pac-Man, Xevious, Mappy, Pac & Pal, Gaplus, Grobda, Motos, Dig Dug II and Pac-Mania, as well as five remade "remix" versions of Rally-X, Galaga, Grobda Motos, Gator Panic and Pac 'n Roll
Pac-Man's Arcade Party	none	2010	none
Notes: Released for arcades; Includes Galaxian, Pac-Man, Rally-X, Galaga, Bosconian, Dig Dug, Xevious, Mappy, Pac-Mania, Galaga '88, Dragon Spirit and Rolling Thunder; A home version was released that included Ms. Pac-Man; Made to celebrate the 30th anniversary of Pac-Man; Was succeeded in 2018 by Pac-Man's Pixel Bash
Pac-Man & Galaga Dimensions	23 June 2011	26 July 2011	26 August 2011
Notes: Released for the Nintendo 3DS; Includes Pac-Man, Galaga, Pac-Man Championship Edition, Galaga Legions, Pac-Man Tilt and Galaga 3D Impact, the last two of which are exclusive to this compilation; Includes a trailer for the then-upcoming Pac-Man and the Ghostly Adventures television series
Galaga 30th Collection	3 July 2011	3 July 2011	3 July 2011
Notes: Released for iOS devices; Includes updated versions of Galaxian, Galaga, Gaplus and Galaga '88; Made to celebrate the 30th anniversary of Galaga
Tekken Hybrid	1 December 2011	22 November 2011	none
Notes: Released for the PlayStation 3; Includes a remastered version of Tekken Tag Tournament, a demo of Tekken Tag Tournament 2 titled Tekken Tag Tournament 2 Prologue, and the film Tekken: Blood Vengeance
Namco Arcade	26 January 2012	2013	2013
Notes: Released for iOS devices; Includes Pac-Man, Galaga, Xevious, Phozon, The Tower of Druaga, Pac-Land, Dragon Buster, Motos, Rolling Thunder and Starblade; Was delisted from the App Store in 2016
Pac-Man Games	none	29 March 2012	none
Notes: Released for iOS devices; Includes remade "score-attack" versions of Pac-Man, Rally-X, Galaga, Dig Dug, Gator Panic and Pac-Chain
Duel Pack: Pac-Man World 3 / Namco Museum DS	none	30 October 2012	none
Notes: Released for the Nintendo DS; Includes Pac-Man World 3 and Namco Museum DS
Pac-Man Museum	25 June 2014	25 February 2014	26 February 2014
Notes: Released for the Xbox 360, PlayStation 3 and Windows; Includes Pac-Man, Super Pac-Man, Pac & Pal, Pac-Land, Pac-Mania, Pac-Attack, Pac-Man Arrangement, Pac-Man Championship Edition and Pac-Man Battle Royale; Ms. Pac-Man was available as free downloadable content until 31 March 2014, becoming a $5 download; The Pac-Man Arrangement in this compilation is the one found in Namco Museum Battle Collection; Ports for the Wii U and Nintendo 3DS were cancelled due to "delayed development"
Arcade Game Series	20 April 2016	20 April 2016	20 April 2016
Notes: Released for the Xbox One, PlayStation 4 and PC; A line of downloadable ports that include Pac-Man, Galaga, Ms. Pac-Man and Dig Dug
Arcade Game Series 3-in-1 Pack	20 April 2016	20 April 2016	20 April 2016
Notes: Released for the Xbox One, PlayStation 4 and PC; Includes the Arcade Game Series releases of Pac-Man, Galaga and Dig Dug.
Pac-Man Championship Edition 2 + Arcade Game Series	none	1 November 2016	none
Notes: Released for the PlayStation 4 and Xbox One; Includes Pac-Man Championship Edition 2 and the Arcade Game Series releases of Pac-Man, Galaga and Dig Dug
Namco Museum	28 July 2017	28 July 2017	28 July 2017
Notes: Released for the Nintendo Switch; Includes Pac-Man, Galaga, Dig Dug, The Tower of Druaga, Sky Kid, Rolling Thunder, Galaga '88, Splatterhouse, Rolling Thunder 2, Tank Force and Pac-Man Vs.
Pac-Man's Pixel Bash	none	June 2018	none
Notes: Released for arcades; The successor to Pac-Man's Arcade Party; Includes the full existing lineup from its predecessor with the addition of King & Balloon, New Rally-X, Pac-Man Plus, Super Pac-Man, Pac & Pal, Super Xevious, The Tower of Druaga, Gaplus, Grobda, Dragon Buster, Baraduke, Metro-Cross, Dig Dug II, Motos, Sky Kid, Sky Kid Deluxe, Hopping Mappy, Splatterhouse and Rompers; Ms. Pac-Man is available only if the machine is set to Free Play; A "chill" version was released for consumers, which replaced the coin door with a refrigerator; Marks the first-ever appearance of Rompers in North America
Namco Museum Arcade Pac	none	28 September 2018	none
Notes: Released for the Nintendo Switch; Bundles the Nintendo Switch Namco Museum compilation with Pac-Man Championship Edition 2 Plus
Namco Museum Mini Player	none	25 July 2019	none
Notes: Handheld system produced by My Arcade; Includes Galaxian, Pac-Man, Galaga, Dig Dug, Xevious, Mappy, The Tower of Druaga, Sky Kid, Dig Dug II, Battle City, Rolling Thunder, Pac-Mania, Dragon Spirit, Phelios, Splatterhouse, Rolling Thunder 2, Splatterhouse 2, Pac-Attack, Rolling Thunder 3 and Pac-Man 2: The New Adventures
Namcot Collection	18 June 2020	none	none
Notes: Released for the Nintendo Switch; Developed by M2 and B.B. Studio; Games can be purchased through the Nintendo eShop via downloadable content packs or individual releases, with a physical version featuring the first downloadable content package; Includes Pac-Man, Galaga, The Tower of Druaga, Battle City, Star Luster, Family Jockey, Youkai Douchuuki, Dragon Spirit: Aratanaru Densetsu, Quinty, Splatterhouse: Wanpaku Graffiti, Galaxian, Mappy, Warpman, Pac-Land, Valkyrie no Bouken: Toki no Kagi, Dragon Buster, Family Circuit, Kaijuu Monogatari, Rolling Thunder, Keru Naguuru, Xevious, Dig Dug, The Tower of Babel, Sky Kid, Metro-Cross, Digital Devil Story: Megami Tensei, The Quest of Ki, King of Kings, Family Pinball, Namco Classic II, and two "demakes" of Pac-Man Championship Edition and Gaplus.
Namco Museum Archives Vol. 1	none	18 June 2020	18 June 2020
Notes: Released for the Nintendo Switch, PlayStation 4, Xbox One, and PC; International version of Namcot Collection; Includes Galaxian, Pac-Man, Xevious, Mappy, Dig Dug, The Tower of Druaga, Sky Kid, Dragon Buster, Dragon Spirit: The New Legend, Splatterhouse: Wanpaku Graffiti, and a "demake" of Pac-Man Championship Edition; Developed by B.B. Studio and M2
Namco Museum Archives Vol. 2	none	18 June 2020	18 June 2020
Notes: Released for the Nintendo Switch, PlayStation 4, Xbox One, and PC; International version of Namcot Collection; Includes Galaga, Battle City, Pac-Land, Dig Dug II, Super Xevious, Mappy-Land, Legacy of the Wizard, Rolling Thunder, Dragon Buster II and Mendel Palace, and a "demake" of Gaplus; Developed by B.B. Studio and M2
Atari 50	none	11 November 2022	11 November 2022
Notes: Released for the Atari VCS, Nintendo Switch, PlayStation 4, PlayStation 5, Windows, Xbox One, and Xbox Series X/S; "The Namco Legendary Pack" downloadable content, set for release in 2025, adds multiple versions of Pac-Man, Dig Dug, Galaxian, Galaga, and Xevious; Developed by Digital Eclipse
Atari 50: The Namco Legendary Pack	none	13 November 2025	13 November 2025
Notes: Released for the Nintendo Switch, PlayStation 4, PlayStation 5, Xbox Series X/S, Xbox One, and Windows; Includes Galaga, Xevious, Galaxian, Dig Dug, Pac-Man

== See also ==
- List of Namco games
- List of Bandai Namco video games
