= Namco Museum: 50th Anniversary =

Namco Museum 50th Anniversary
- Developer: Digital Eclipse
- Publishers: JP: Namco; NA: Namco Hometek; PAL: Electronic Arts
- Series: Namco Museum
- Platforms: Game Boy Advance, PlayStation 2, Xbox, GameCube, Windows
- Release: August 30, 2005: Game Boy Advance, PlayStation 2, Xbox; NA: August 30, 2005; JP: January 26, 2006; AU: January 31, 2006; EU: March 31, 2006 GameCube; NA: August 30, 2005; EU: June 9, 2006 Windows; NA: October 25, 2005; AU: March 27, 2006; EU: May 19, 2006
- Genre: Various
- Modes: Single-player, multiplayer

Namco Museum: 50th Anniversary is a 2005 video game compilation developed by Digital Eclipse and published by Namco. It was released on August 30, 2005.

== Games ==
- Pac-Man
- Ms. Pac-Man
- Galaga
- Galaxian
- Dig Dug
- Pole Position
- Pole Position II
- Rolling Thunder
- Rally-X
- Bosconian
- Dragon Spirit
- Sky Kid
- Xevious
- Mappy
- Pac-Mania
- Galaga '88

== Reception ==
Reception

Review scores
Publication	Score
GameSpy	3.5/5 (GameCube)
GameSpot	5.9/10 (PS2)
GameZone	5/10 (Xbox)
IGN	5/10 (Xbox)
Jeuxvideo	6/20 (GameCube)
PC Action	29%
TeamXbox	6.4/10 (Xbox)
USA Today	3/4

GameSpy called Namco Museum: 50th Anniversarya hard deal to pass up. IGN found Namco Museum: 50th Anniversary to be disappointing.
