= Pac-Man 99 =

2021 video game

- Developer: Arika
- Publisher: Bandai Namco Entertainment
- Director: Hiroshi Nakamichi
- Producer: Motohiro Okubo
- Composers: Shinji Hosoe; Ayako Saso
- Series: Pac-Man
- Platform: Nintendo Switch
- Release: April 7, 2021
- Genres: Maze, battle royale
- Modes: Single-player, multiplayer

Pac-Man 99 (Note: Japanese: パックマン99, Hepburn: Pakkuman 99) is a battle royale maze video game developed by Arika and published by Bandai Namco Entertainment for the Nintendo Switch. It was released through the Nintendo Switch Online service on April 7, 2021.

Part of its Pac-Man franchise, its gameplay involves up to 99 players competing simultaneously, similar to Tetris 99. Players control Pac-Man through an enclosed maze, eating dots on the board and avoiding colored ghosts that pursue them. Eating power pellets causes the ghosts to turn blue and become edible; eating ghosts sends enemies called "Jammer Pac-Man" to another opponent in an attempt to slow them down and eliminate them from the game. The game featured paid downloadable content that includes offline play and additional skins, with some based on other Namco games.

The game was discontinued on October 8, 2023, though the game remains playable offline for those who purchased the "Unlock Mode" or "Unlock All" DLCs before they were delisted the month prior.

== Gameplay ==
Gameplay consists of traditional Pac-Man gameplay, with the white enemies being Jammer Pac-Man sent by other players. To the left and right are the screens of other players.

The gameplay echoes that of the original Pac-Man; with maze chase gameplay, the player controls Pac-Man, navigating a board and eating the white dots – called "Pac-Dots" – he comes across. While doing this, four ghosts are eventually released at different intervals and will begin to chase Pac-Man, each in their own unique way. In the four corners of the maze are large flashing dots called "power pellets", and when consumed by Pac-Man the ghosts will turn blue and flee; Pac-Man can eat the ghosts during this brief period of time. Various bonus fruit can also be consumed to reset the level.

As an online battle royale game, the player will be playing alongside 98 others, their screens being visible to the player and are displayed on the left and right. When one player chooses to target another, every ghost Pac-Man eats will cause a "Jammer Pac-Man" to be sent to the opponent, which will target their Pac-Man and slow them down on impact, but can be removed by eating a power pellet. Red variants of the Jammer Pac-Man will eliminate the player on impact, and become still when the player has a power pellet active. Red Jammer Pac-Men are eliminated when the player eats a fruit. There are also "sleeping ghosts" that, when eaten, create a train of miniature clones behind ghosts, which can be eaten to overwhelm opponents with enemies when a power pellet is active. After eating a certain amount of Pac-Dots, a bonus fruit appears, and generates a new maze when eaten along with the sleeping ghosts, allowing the player to continue attacking other players. When a player comes in contact with a ghost, they are eliminated from the pool of 99 players. This continues until one player remains, with that player declared the overall winner of the match.

The player is given a multitude of abilities to give Pac-Man to add a layer of strategy, such as the ability to make Pac-Man move faster or be stronger. These effects are only active for the duration of a power pellet. Players can target any opponent they choose, but also players that are in particular situations; they are given the option to send future Jammer Pac-Man to an opponent who is about to be knocked out, players that are attacking the main player, and players that have the most knockouts (KOs). Random players can also be targeted.

== Development and release ==
Pac-Man 99 was developed by Arika, which had previously designed the similar battle royale games Tetris 99 and Super Mario Bros. 35, and published by Bandai Namco Entertainment. Pearl Lai, brand manager of Bandai Namco Entertainment of America, believed the game was a good concept as it combined multiplayer battle royale gameplay with the already competitive Pac-Man. The game was announced on social media on April 6, 2021, five days after the discontinuation of Super Mario Bros. 35, and released the following day on the Nintendo Switch for consumers who have purchased a Nintendo Switch Online membership.

Alongside release, there was also a variety of purchasable downloadable content (DLC). DLC was released in separate forms: the Mode Unlock DLC comes with offline and extra modes such as private matches and score attack modes, in addition to several themes. Special DLC themes were released separately, which change the look of the graphics to the likes of other classic Namco arcade games, featuring themes based on Galaga, Dig Dug, Xevious, The Tower of Druaga, The Return of Ishtar, Metro-Cross, New Rally-X, Mappy, Genpei Tōma Den, Cosmo Gang the Video, Yokai Dochuki, Dragon Buster, Valkyrie no Densetsu, Rolling Thunder, Dragon Spirit, Wonder Momo, Baraduke, Toy Pop, Bravoman and Sky Kid. An all-in-one bundle labelled the Deluxe Pack was released on the same day, containing all DLC. Additional themes based on Namco games such as Hopping Mappy, Warp & Warp, The Tower of Babel, Wagan Land, Tank Battalion and Splatterhouse: Wanpaku Graffiti were released for free post-launch.

On May 16, 2023, Bandai Namco and Nintendo announced that the game would be discontinued on October 8, 2023, though players that own the Mode Unlock DLC will be able to continue playing the offline modes after the game's servers shut down. The paid DLC themes and Mode Unlock DLC were delisted in August and September respectively.

== Reception ==
Reception

Aggregate scores
Aggregator	Score
Metacritic	76/100
OpenCritic	58% recommend

Review scores
Publication	Score
Game Informer	7.5/10
IGN	7/10
Nintendo Life	9/10
Shacknews	9/10

Pac-Man 99 received a 76 out of 100 on review aggregator website Metacritic, indicating "generally favorable reviews". Fellow review aggregator OpenCritic assessed that the game received strong approval, being recommended by 58% of critics.
