= Namco Museum Virtual Arcade =

2008 video game

- Developer: Namco Bandai Games
- Publisher: Namco Bandai Games (Note: Released under the Namco brand name outside North America)
- Director: Todd Thorson
- Series: Namco Museum
- Platform: Xbox Live Arcade
- Release: NA: August 31, 2008; EU: May 15, 2009; AU: May 21, 2009; JP: September 5, 2009
- Genre: Various
- Modes: Single-player, multiplayer

Namco Museum Virtual Arcade (Note: Japanese: ナムコミュージアムバーチャルアーケード, Hepburn: Namuko Myūjiamu Bācharu Ākēdo) is a video game compilation developed and published by Namco Bandai Games for the Xbox 360. It was released in North America in 2008 and in Europe and Japan in 2009. Part of its Namco Museum series, Virtual Arcade includes 34 titles; nine of these are Namco Bandai-published Xbox Live Arcade games, and the rest are arcade games that are only accessible through the disc. Players can access the Xbox Live Arcade games through the Xbox Dashboard if the disc is in the console.

== Games ==
Namco Museum Virtual Arcade is a compilation of video games published by Namco and its successor, Namco Bandai Games. The collection contains 34 games that encompass a variety of genres, including maze chasers, shoot 'em ups, and platformers. It is divided into two sets of games that can be selected in the in-game menu. The first set contains nine Namco Bandai-published games for Xbox Live Arcade. In addition to being selectable through the main menu, it can be accessed through the Xbox 360's dashboard, as long as the disc is in the console. Some of these are ports of arcade games like Pac-Man (1980) and Xevious (1983), while others such as Pac-Man Championship Edition (2007) are brand-new sequels with different gameplay structures and mechanics. These Xbox Live Arcade games also contain achievements and online leaderboards. The second set of games is only available on the disc, and includes 22 Namco arcade games from the 1970s and 1980s as well as three "Arrangement" remakes of Pac-Man, Galaga (1981), and Dig Dug (1982). Players can modify in-game settings such as controller inputs, difficulty, and the starting number of lives. This would also be the last time Ms. Pac-Man (1982) would be included in a Namco Museum video game compilation, as future reissues were strictly standalone or on dedicated minicades.

Titles included in Namco Museum Virtual Arcade
Xbox Live Arcade games
Title	Genre	Original release
Dig Dug	Maze	1982
Galaga	Fixed shooter	1981
Galaga Legions	Twin-stick shooter	2008
Mr. Driller Online	Puzzle	2008
Ms. Pac-Man	Maze	1982
New Rally-X	Maze	1981
Pac-Man	Maze	1980
Pac-Man Championship Edition	Maze	2007
Xevious	Vertical-scrolling shooter	1983
Museum games
Title	Genre	Original release
Baraduke	Platform	1985
Bosconian	Multi-directional shooter	1981
Dig Dug II	Maze	1985
Dig Dug Arrangement	Maze	2005
Dragon Buster	Platform	1985
Dragon Spirit	Vertical-scrolling shooter	1987
Galaga '88	Fixed shooter	1987
Galaga Arrangement	Fixed shooter	2005
Galaxian	Fixed shooter	1987
Grobda	Multi-directional shooter	1984
King & Balloon	Fixed shooter	1980
Mappy	Platform	1983
Metro-Cross	Platform	1985
Motos	Platform	1985
Pac & Pal	Maze	1983
Pac-Man Arrangement	Maze	2005
Pac-Mania	Maze	1987
Pole Position	Racing	1982
Pole Position II	Racing	1983
Rally-X	Maze	1980
Rolling Thunder	Platform	1987
Sky Kid	Horizontal-scrolling shooter	1985
Sky Kid Deluxe	Horizontal-scrolling shooter	1986
Super Pac-Man	Maze	1982
The Tower of Druaga	Maze	1984

== Development and release ==
Namco Museum Virtual Arcade was developed and published by Namco Bandai Games for the Xbox 360. Its development was handled by the company's North American division, with its marketing director Todd Thorson serving as the project director. Virtual Arcade was designed to be the largest and most comprehensive in Namco Museum line of compilations, in addition to serving as a convenient and affordable way for consumers to play its back catalog. The collection is the first Namco Museum to include Sky Kid Deluxe (1986), which had previously been rereleased in Japan through Namco Collection Vol. 1 (1999) for Windows. The three Arrangement games were taken from the PlayStation Portable game Namco Museum Battle Collection (2005), and were upscaled and modified to support high definition video and improved sound. Pac-Man Championship Edition, Galaga Legions, and Mr. Driller Online were added to the lineup to represent the company's ability to produce well-designed followups to its older arcade games.

Namco Bandai Games announced Virtual Arcade at the 2008 Electronic Entertainment Expo (E3), and released it in North America on November 4, 2008. The game was later released in Europe on May 15, 2009, in Australia on May 21, 2009, and in Japan on November 5, 2009. In the European version, Metro-Cross is renamed Retro-Cross.

== Reception ==
Reception

Aggregate score
Aggregator	Score
Metacritic	63/100

Review scores
Publication	Score
GameSpot	7.5/10
GamesRadar+	3/5
Hardcore Gamer	3.5/5
IGN	6.5/10
Jeuxvideo.com	13/20
Retro Gamer	80%

According to the review aggregator website Metacritic, Namco Museum Virtual Arcade received "mixed or average reviews", holding a 63/100 on the site. It sold 5,912 copies in Japan by the end of 2009, making it one of the worst-selling Namco Museum games in the country.

Critics were generally pleased with the selection of games. Steve Hannley, a reviewer for GamesRadar+, wrote: "For the right buyer, this is a gleaming golden treasure even with bits of tarnish here and there." Out of the included titles, Pac-Man Championship Edition and Galaga Legions were considered the highlights of the package. Jeuxvideo.com author Pixelpirate recommended Virtual Arcade for those games alone. The inclusion of Namco Bandai's Xbox Live Arcade library was also met with praise, and critics said this helped make the collection worth the purchase. Among the Museum games, critics found Dragon Spirit, Pole Position, and Metro-Cross to be some of the standouts. GameSpot's Don Francis felt the library relied too heavily on Pac-Man games, but possessed a good selection of titles regardless. Writing for IGN, Ryan Geddes pointed out that most of the games were included in past Namco Museum collections, and said those are likely worth seeking out instead of Virtual Arcade.

The collection drew largely negative responses towards its presentation. The menu layout was criticized for being needlessly complicated and making it difficult to navigate through the different libraries. Francis and a reviewer for Retro Gamer showed frustration towards this menu as hindering what is otherwise a well-made compilation. Pixelpirate similarly found the menu difficult to use, but praised its minimalist art style and background music. The lack of included extras was criticized by Geddes, who unfavorably compared it to collections like Activision Anthology that contained additional content like developer interviews and artwork scans. Some also disliked the controls for certain games, though they attributed this to the poor quality of the Xbox 360's directional pad and not the pack itself.
