= Namco Museum Remix =

2007 video game

- European cover art
- Developer: Namco Bandai Games
- Publisher: Namco Bandai Games (Note: Released under the Namco brand name outside North America.): EU: Atari Europe
- Series: Namco Museum
- Platform: Wii
- Release: Remix: NA: October 23, 2007; JP: December 6, 2007; EU: April 18, 2008; AU: May 1, 2008; Megamix: NA: November 16, 2010
- Genre: Various
- Modes: Single-player, multiplayer

Namco Museum Remix (Note: Known in Japan as Minna de Asobou! Namco Carnival (みんなで遊ぼう!ナムコカーニバル, Minna de Asobou! Namuko Kānibaru; Let's Play Together! Namco Carnival)) is a 2007 video game compilation developed and published by Namco Bandai Games for the Wii. The compilation includes nine arcade games originally developed by Namco and five "remix" games made specifically for this compilation. An enhanced version, Namco Museum Megamix, was released exclusively in North America on November 26, 2010; the game features nine other arcade games alongside the titles from the original, as well as an additional remix game based on Grobda.

== Overview ==
Namco Museum Remix is part of the Namco Museum series of arcade compilations. Just like with other Namco Museum games, it includes a collection of classic arcade titles. However, these are actually ports, rather than being emulated, and are presented in the same style as in Namco Museum Battle Collection for the PlayStation Portable. This game also adds five "Remix" versions with updated graphics and gameplay which differs from the originals in some cases significantly. For example, in Galaga Remix, players not only have to protect themselves, but also protect Pac-Man as he rolls through space. The "Remix" games feature Miis, and each minigame is presented as an "attraction" in an amusement park; you gain access to the original arcade games by entering the Carnival Arcade building.

== Namco Museum Megamix ==
An enhanced version, entitled Namco Museum Megamix, was released on November 16, 2010, in North America only. Megamix features all of the titles from the earlier version, and adds a "Remix" version of Grobda, the original versions of the "Remix" titles (excluding Pac 'n Roll and Gator Panic), plus Bosconian, Dig Dug II, Galaga, Grobda, King & Balloon, Motos, New Rally-X, Pac-Man, and Rally-X. Megamix features a level select feature for all original arcade games with the exception of Cutie Q.

Title	Release	Remix	Megamix	Notes
Arcade titles
Cutie Q	1979	Yes	Yes	
Dig Dug	1982	Yes	Yes	
Galaxian	1979	Yes	Yes	
Gaplus	1984	Yes	Yes	
Mappy	1983	Yes	Yes	
Pac & Pal	1983	Yes	Yes	
Pac-Mania	1987	Yes	Yes	
Super Pac-Man	1982	Yes	Yes	
Xevious	1982	Yes	Yes	
Bosconian	1981	No	Yes	
Dig Dug II	1985	No	Yes	
Galaga	1981	No	Yes	
Grobda	1984	No	Yes	
King & Balloon	1980	No	Yes	
Motos	1985	No	Yes	
New Rally-X	1981	No	Yes	
Pac-Man	1980	No	Yes	
Rally-X	1980	No	Yes	
Remixed titles
Pac-Motos	2007	Yes	Yes	Pac-Man-themed reimagining of Motos
Pac 'n Roll Remix	2007	Yes	Yes	originally a Nintendo DS title
Galaga Remix	2007	Yes	Yes	different from the iOS game titled Galaga Remix
Rally-X Remix	2007	Yes	Yes	
Gator Panic Remix	2007	Yes	Yes	originally a redemption game
Grobda Remix	2010	No	Yes	

== Reception ==
Reception

Aggregate score
Aggregator	Score
Metacritic	(Remix) 49/100 (Megamix) 53/100

Review scores
Publication	Score
Destructoid	(Megamix) 6/10
Eurogamer	(Remix) 5/10
GamesRadar+	(Megamix) 3/5
GameZone	(Remix) 5.2/10
IGN	(Remix) 5/10
Nintendo Life	(Remix) 7/10
Nintendo World Report	(Megamix) 5/10

Namco Museum Remix received generally unfavorable reviews on Metacritic whereas Namco Museum Megamix received mixed to average reviews. Namco Museum Remix received mixed reviews with a score of 55.05% on GameRankings. Criticisms focused on a lack of classic arcade games such as Pac-Man and Ms. Pac-Man, the inclusion of largely obscure titles such as Pac & Pal, Cutie Q, and Super Pac-Man and for the "Remix" games being "almost unplayable". Namco Museum Megamix also received mixed reviews with a score of 60.33% on GameRankings. The Megamix version was criticized for not including a wider variety of Namco games, as well as being little more than just a repackaging of 2007's Namco Museum Remix with slight changes. Both Remix and Megamix were also criticized for the unnatural and awkward control schemes with the Wii Remote, Nunchuk, and Classic Controller, as well as the lack of GameCube controller support. Other criticisms include that the visuals of the "Remix" games pale in comparison to other Wii titles, the hub world being confusing when toggling between games, and the lack of bonus content and leaderboards for both versions.

== Legacy ==
The Pac-Motos and Pac n' Roll Remix games from the compilation are included in Pac-Man Museum+, with Pac-Motos being presented as an unlockable title.

== See also ==
- Namco Museum
- List of Bandai Namco video game compilations
