= Party Land =

2006 video game

- Developer(s): Namco Bandai Games
- Publisher(s): Namco Bandai Games
- Platform(s): Mobile Phone
- Release: May 15, 2006
- Mode(s): Single player

Party Land (パーティーランド) is a sugoroku mobile phone game published by Namco in 2006. This game contains 10 playable Namco characters as Crossover and five scenarios based on Mappy, The Tower of Druaga, Valkyrie no Densetsu, Sky Kid and Dig Dug II.
