= Namco Museum Battle Collection =

2005 video game compilation

- North American cover art
- Developer: Namco
- Publishers: JP: Namco; NA: Namco Hometek; EU: Sony Computer Entertainment
- Director: Yasuhiro Nishimoto
- Producer: Nobutaka Nakajima
- Series: Namco Museum
- Platform: PlayStation Portable
- Release: JP: February 24, 2005; NA: August 23, 2005; EU: December 9, 2005
- Genre: Various
- Modes: Single-player, multiplayer

Namco Museum Battle Collection (Note: Known in Japan as Namco Museum (ナムコミュージアム; lit. Namuko Myūjiamu)) is a 2005 video game compilation developed and published by Namco for the PlayStation Portable. It is the first Namco Museum title since the original PlayStation series to be developed in Japan. It includes 21 games - four of these are brand-new "arrangement" remakes of older Namco games, while the rest are emulated ports of Namco arcade games from the 1970s and 1980s. These ports include an options menu that allows the player to modify the in-game settings, such as the screen orientation and number of lives. Players can send one-level demos to a friend's console via the "Game Sharing" option in the main menu.

Battle Collection was the first PlayStation Portable game to make use of the system's game sharing function. The Japanese version of the game, simply titled Namco Museum, was split into two different volumes; the second volume includes three games not found in international releases, these being Dragon Spirit and two new "arrangement" games based on Pac-Man and Motos.

Battle Collection was met with a positive response from critics; reviewers applauded the large library of games, emulation quality and multiplayer features, but criticized the Game Sharing option, which many deemed "useless", and the game requiring a firmware update to boot. In Japan, the first game sold 79,572 copies in its first week of release.

== Games ==
Namco Museum Battle Collection includes a total of 21 games; 17 of these are ports of Namco arcade games from the 1970s and 1980s, including Pac-Man, Ms. Pac-Man and Galaga. They encompass several different game genres, such as maze, shoot'em up and platform. Each of the arcade game ports allow the player to modify the in-game settings, such as the number of lives and screen orientation, as well as access to a sound test and autosave feature. A "Game Sharing" option can be accessed from the main menu, allowing the player to send one-level demos to a friend's PSP system. Alongside the arcade games, four new "Arrangement" games have been included, which are new to this collection. These games include 3D graphics and incorporate new features, such as power-ups, new stages, world maps and boss fights. Despite their similar name, they share nothing in common with the "Arrangement" games found in both Namco Classic Collection Vol. 1 and Namco Classic Collection Vol. 2.

Games included in Namco Museum Battle Collection
Arrangement games
Title	Genre	Release date	Vol. (Japan)
Pac-Man Arrangement CS. Ver	Maze	2005	1
Galaga Arrangement	Fixed shooter	2005	1
Dig Dug Arrangement	Maze	2005	1
New Rally-X Arrangement	Maze	2005	1
Motos Arrangement (Note: Only available in the Japanese release.)	Platform	2006	2
Pac-Man Arrangement Plus	Maze	2006	2
Arcade games
Title	Genre	Original release	Vol. (Japan)
Galaxian	Fixed shooter	1979	1
Pac-Man	Maze	1980	1
Rally-X	Maze	1980	1
King & Balloon	Fixed shooter	1980	2
Galaga	Fixed shooter	1981	1
Bosconian	Multi-directional shooter	1981	2
New Rally-X	Maze	1981	1
Ms. Pac-Man	Maze	1982	1
Dig Dug	Maze	1982	1
Xevious	Vertical-scrolling shooter	1983	2
Mappy	Platform	1983	2
The Tower of Druaga	Role-playing	1984	2
Grobda	Multi-directional shooter	1984	2
Dragon Buster	Action role-playing	1985	2
Dig Dug II	Platform	1985	2
Motos	Platform	1985	2
Rolling Thunder	Run'n gun	1986	2
Dragon Spirit	Vertical-scrolling shooter	1987	2

== Ports ==
The Pac-Man Arrangement, Galaga Arrangement, and Dig Dug Arrangement games were featured in the 2008 compilation title Namco Museum Virtual Arcade, and were also ported to iOS under the names Pac-Man Remix, Galaga Remix, and Dig Dug Remix in 2009. Galaga Remix and Dig Dug Remix include the original arcade versions of Galaga and Dig Dug. Pac-Man Arrangement was featured in the 2014 compilation title Pac-Man Museum. All ports lack the 2 player modes found in the original games.

As of 2018, Pac-Man Remix, Galaga Remix and Dig Dug Remix have been delisted from the App Store and are no longer available for download. Additionally, the games do not run on devices running iOS 11 and higher as the system has dropped support for 32-bit apps. Pac-Man Museum has been delisted from all digital storefronts as of 2020.

Pac-Man Arrangement (labelled as Pac-Man Arrangement CS Ver. to distinguish itself from the 1996 game) is included in Pac-Man Museum+ as an unlockable title, released in 2022.

== Reception ==
Reception

Aggregate scores
Aggregator	Score
GameRankings	72.02%
Metacritic	73/100

Review scores
Publication	Score
1Up.com	B+
GameSpot	7.5/10
GameSpy	4/5
IGN	7.5/10

Namco Museum Battle Collection was met with a mostly positive critical reception. Many would praise the compilation's multiplayer features, emulation quality and large library of games. It has an average critic score of 74.02% on GameRankings and 73/100 on Metacritic.

IGN gave the game a 7.5 out of 10, praising the game for its multiplayer features, sound, and graphics. However, they criticized the Game Sharing feature for its limited usage and lack of Arrangement games. GameSpot's Jeff Gerstmann gave the game a 7.5, praising the game's 21 game titles, various display options, controls, and good emulation. However, he criticized the game sharing demo for its bare-bones presentation, and requiring the PSP to be at the latest firmware before use.

== See also ==
- List of Namco Museum compilations
- List of Namco retro video game compilations
