= Rompers =

Rompers may refer to:

- Rompers (video game), a Japan-only 1989 arcade game by Namco
- Romper suit, an article of clothing
