= Arcade Classics (CD-i video game) =

1996 video game

- Developer: Namco
- Publisher: Philips Media
- Composer: Chris Helmore
- Platform: Philips CD-i
- Release: 1996
- Genre: Arcade game
- Mode: Single-player

Arcade Classics is a video game compilation released on CD-i containing ports of three Namco arcade games. The compilation was released in Europe but not in North America.

It contains the games Galaxian (1979), Galaga (1981), and Ms. Pac-Man (1982). Galaxian resembles the Famicom port instead of it representing the original arcade game. Galaga is cropped into a "window" while the status (lives, score, etc.) is moved into the outer frame. Ms. Pac-Man resembles Tengen's ports of the game and even includes the extras from their ports (multiple sets of mazes, simultaneous multiplayer, etc.).

== See also ==
- List of Namco retro video game compilations
