= Super Pac-Man =

1982 video game

- Japanese arcade flyer
- Developer: Namco
- Publishers: JP/EU: Namco; NA: Bally Midway
- Designer: Toru Iwatani
- Composer: Nobuyuki Ohnogi
- Series: Pac-Man
- Platforms: Arcade, Sord M5, PV-2000, Commodore 64, IBM PC, MS-DOS, Game Boy Color, mobile phone
- Release: September 1982: Arcade; JP: September 1982; EU: 1982; NA: January 1983 M5, PV-2000; JP: 1983 C64; 1988 IBM PC, MS-DOS; 1989 Game Boy Color; NA: November 3, 1999; EU: 1999 Mobile; NA: May 10, 2006
- Genre: Maze
- Modes: Single-player, multiplayer
- Arcade system: Namco Super Pac-Man

Super Pac-Man (Note: Japanese: スーパーパックマン, Hepburn: Sūpā Pakku Man) is a 1982 maze video game developed and published by Namco for arcades. It was released in Japan and Europe in 1982 and in North America by Bally Midway in 1983. It is the sequel to the original Pac-Man (1980). Bally Midway had previously commissioned General Computer Corporation to develop the unofficial sequel Ms. Pac-Man (1982), with which Namco had little involvement beyond licensing. Toru Iwatani returned as the game's designer.

== Gameplay ==
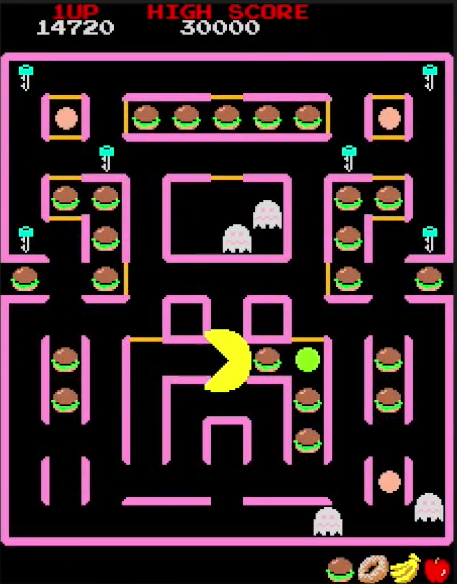
Screenshot with Pac-Man in Super form

Sound and gameplay mechanics were altered radically from the first two entries in the Pac-Man series. Instead of eating dots, Pac-Man must eat keys in order to open doors. The doors open sections of the maze that contain what in earlier games were known as "fruits" (foods such as apples and bananas, or other prizes such as Galaxian flagships), which became the basic items that must be cleared. Once all the food is eaten, the player advances to the next level, in which point value of the food is increased. In earlier levels, keys unlock nearby doors, while as the player progresses through the levels, it is more common for keys to open faraway doors. Pac-Man can enter the ghost house at any time without a key.

In addition to the original power pellets that allow Pac-Man to eat the ghosts, two "Super" pellets are available that will transform Pac-Man into Super Pac-Man for a short time. In this form, he becomes much larger, can move with increased speed when the "Super Speed" button is pressed and can eat through doors without unlocking them. He is also invulnerable to the ghosts, who appear thin and flat to convey the illusion of Super Pac-Man flying over them. However, he cannot eat them without the help of the original power-up. When Super Pac-Man is about to revert to regular Pac-Man, he flashes white. The Super power can then be prolonged by eating a power pellet or super pellet, if available.

A point bonus can be scored if Pac-Man eats a star that appears between the two center boxes while assorted symbols flash inside them. Usually, one symbol stops while the other continues until the star is eaten, a life is lost or too much time elapses. If the star is eaten when two symbols match, the bonus is 2,000 points for any match and 5,000 points if the matching symbols are the same as the level being played. Otherwise, the bonus is similar to the award for eating a ghost, which is 200, 400, 800 or 1,600 points, depending on the level. On some versions, higher levels might award the 2,000 or 5,000 points without regard to the symbols.

Bonus levels appear at intervals. The player is presented with a maze full of food items and must eat them all in order to collect the points on a countdown timer. Pac-Man appears in "Super" mode infinitely throughout the stage, and there are no ghosts. Players also receive bonus points if the level is cleared within the time limit.

== Reception ==
Upon the game's release in 1982, Bally Midway projected that it would sell about 10,000 to 15,000 arcade units in the United States. By May 1983, it was the top-earning arcade game of the month.

Arcade Express rated the arcade game 8 out of 10, stating that the "newly-designed maze features keys, locked doors, and Super Energy Dots, making it the latest thrill for gobbler-lovers."

Iwatani was critical of the game, criticizing Pac-Man's enlarged size in Super form and calling the game boring.

== Ports ==
Ports for the PV-2000 and the Sord M5 were released in Japan under the titles Mr. Packn and Power Pac, respectively. The game was ported to the Commodore 64 in 1988, followed by IBM PC and MS-DOS in 1989. Ports for the Atari 5200 and the Atari 8-bit computers were finished in 1984, but not released.

The game was also available on the Game Boy Color with the release of Ms. Pac-Man: Special Color Edition in 1999.

== Legacy ==
In 1996, Super Pac-Man appeared in the second Namco Museum arcade compilation for the PlayStation (not included in the Japanese version). In 1998, Namco released Super Pac-Man as part of Namco History Volume 3 for the PC in Japan only. In 1999, Super Pac-Man was included alongside Ms. Pac-Man in Ms. Pac-Man: Special Color Edition for the Game Boy Color. In 2006, Jakks Pacific released the Plug and Play Super Pac-Man joystick that contains Super Pac-Man along with Pac-Man, Pac-Man Plus and Pac & Pal. Super Pac-Man was also featured in TV Games' Arcade Gold: Pac-Man from 2007 & Retro Arcade...Pac-Man in 2008. Namco released Super Pac-Man along with Pac & Pal, Pac 'n Roll, Pac-Mania and other games outside of the franchise in Namco Museum Remix and Namco Museum Megamix in late 2007 and late 2010, respectively. Namco rereleased Super Pac-Man on mobile phones as a deluxe version with updated 3D graphics and recreated sound effects.

In 2006, Namco released a portable version on select mobile phone models exclusively on Sprint. Sprint and Namco conducted a promotional sweepstakes with a grand prize of a Volkswagen New Beetle customized with Super Pac-Man art. The car was displayed at the major videogame tradeshow E3 in Los Angeles in May 2006. The sweepstakes began June 1, 2006 and ended on July 31, 2006.

On November 4, 2008, Super Pac-Man was released in Namco Museum Virtual Arcade for the Xbox 360. Bandai added Super Pac-Man to its Pac-Man Connect & Play controller in 2012. Super Pac-Man was released as part of Pac-Man Museum in 2014.

Pac-Man transforms into Super Pac-Man as part of his Final Smash in the 2014 game Super Smash Bros. for Nintendo 3DS and Wii U and its follow-up Super Smash Bros. Ultimate. In both games, the point values for the fifth and sixth chomps are changed to 3,200 and 7,650, respectively.

Hamster Corporation released the game as part of their Arcade Archives series for the Nintendo Switch and PlayStation 4 in January 2022.

Super Pac-Man is included in the compilation title Pac-Man Museum+ as an unlockable title, which was released on May 27, 2022 for PC, PlayStation 4, Xbox One and Nintendo Switch.
