= Rally-X =

1980 video game

- North American arcade flyer
- Developer: Namco
- Publishers: JP/DE: Namco; NA: Midway Manufacturing; EU: Karateco
- Designer: Hirohito Ito
- Programmers: Kazuo Kurosu; Kouichi Tashiro
- Artist: Hiroshi Ono
- Composer: Toshio Kai
- Series: Rally-X
- Platforms: Arcade, VIC-20, MSX, Sharp X1, Fujitsu FM-7, MZ-1500
- Release: October 3, 1980: Arcade; JP: October 3, 1980 (Note: First demonstrated in January 1980, followed by wide release on October 3, 1980); NA: February 1981; EU: 1981 VIC-20; JP: 1981 MSX; JP: 1984; EU: 1984 FM-7, MZ-1500, X1; JP: 1984
- Genre: Maze
- Modes: Single-player, multiplayer

Rally-X (Note: Japanese: ラリーX, Hepburn: Rarī-Ekkusu) is a 1980 maze video game developed and published by Namco for arcades. It was released on October 3, 1980 in Japan, by Midway Manufacturing in North America in February 1981 and by Karateco in Europe in 1981. Players drive a blue Formula One race car through a multidirectional scrolling maze to collect yellow flags. Boulders block some paths and must be avoided. Red enemy cars pursue the player in an attempt to collide with them. Red cars can be temporarily stunned by laying down smoke screens at the cost of fuel. Rally-X is one of the first games with bonus stages and continuously playing background music.

Rally-X was designed as a successor and rival to Sega's Head On (1979). It was a commercial success in Japan, where it was the sixth highest-grossing game of 1980, but Midway released the game in North America to largely underwhelming results. The game is known in North America for an often-repeated, though untrue, story involving its demonstration at the 1980 Amusement & Music Operators Association trade show, where the attending press believed Rally-X was of superior quality than the other games presented, specifically Pac-Man. Though it was well-received by attendees, Rally-X failed to attract much attention during its presentation.

Reception for Rally-X, both at release and retrospectively, has highlighted its technological accomplishments and high difficulty. Some reviewers have found it to be influential and ahead of its time. Rally-X received several remakes and sequels, beginning with the slightly tweaked New Rally-X in 1981. It is also included in several Namco compilations.

== Gameplay ==
The player (blue) about to collect a flag with two red enemy cars in pursit

Rally-X is a maze chase game where the player controls a blue Formula One racecar. The objective is to collect yellow flags that are scattered around an enclosed maze while avoiding collision with red-colored cars that pursue the player. Mazes scroll in the four cardinal directions and are clustered with dead ends, long corridors, and stationary boulders that are harmful to the player. Each level contains ten flags that increase their point value when collected in succession. One of the flags is a "Special Flag", indicated by an S next to it, which doubles the value of each flag collected thereafter. The player can temporarily stun the red cars with smoke screens, which depletes a portion of their fuel meter at the right of the screen. The meter constantly depletes the longer the player takes in a level, and acts as a timer. If the fuel meter gets about 3/4 low, the meter will turn red. If it runs out, the player will move very slowly and allow the red cars to catch up much quicker, and the player will not be able to drop any more smoke screens. As the game progresses, more red cars are added and become more aggressive. If the player is crashed by any car, they will lose a life. The game ends when all lives are lost.

The player has a radar beneath their fuel meter, which displays their current position on the map as well as the location of the flags and red cars. The third level and every fourth thereafter is a bonus round (called a "Charanging Stage"), where the objective is to collect the flags in a certain amount of time. In these bonus rounds, the red cars remain idle and will not chase the player unless their fuel is empty.

== Development and release ==
Rally-X was created by Namco and designed by Hirohito Ito, with hardware developed by Kouichi Tashiro. It was produced as a successor to Head On (1979), an older arcade game from Sega that similarly involved collecting items in a maze while avoiding enemy cars that pursued the player. Head On was a popular title in Japanese arcades, which gave Namco the idea of creating a game that built on its mechanics. Rally-X was created on a version of the Pac-Man arcade system board that supports multi-directional scrolling. The programming was done by Kazuo Kurosu, who went on to design the multi-directional shooter Bosconian (1981), and featured music from Pac-Man composer Toshio Kai.

Rally-X was first demonstrated in Japan in January 1980, before receiving a wide release on October 3, 1980. When preparing to release the game overseas, Namco believed Rally-X had more foreign appeal than Pac-Man with its audiovisual presentation and challenge, which it believed American audiences would prefer to the simplicity and "cuteness" present in Pac-Man. Namco presented Rally-X at the 1980 Amusement & Music Operators Union (AMOA) tradeshow in Chicago, Illinois, alongside Pac-Man, King & Balloon, and Tank Battalion. An often-repeated story is that out of the games presented, specifically Pac-Man, the attending industry analysts believed Rally-X was the stand-out and the one destined to be successful. Though it received praise from the press, Rally-X did not attract much attention during the event. According to Play Meter magazine, both Pac-Man and Rally-X received mild attention at the show. Midway Manufacturing, the video game division of Bally Manufacturing, agreed to distribute Rally-X and Pac-Man in North America. Dave Marofske, the president of Midway, believed the two had the most potential out of the four Namco games presented. Midway released Rally-X in North America in February 1981 in upright, tabletop, and cabaret cabinet variations.

=== Conversions ===
A home conversion of Rally-X was released for the VIC-20 in Japan in 1981. The port was developed by HAL Laboratory and published by the Japanese division of Commodore International. Due to licensing restrictions, HAL changed the game's characters to mice and cats and released it in North America as Radar Rat Race. Namco released a port for the MSX in 1984 that adopted the gameplay of New Rally-X, which was released in Europe by Argus Press Software under the Bug-Byte name. Dempa Shinbun developed versions for the Fujitsu FM-7, MZ-1500, and Sharp X1 computers in Japan the same year.

Rally-X remained relatively obscure for many years until 1995, when it was included in the PlayStation compilation Namco Museum Vol. 1 along with six other Namco arcade games. The port uses a JAMMA emulator running the source code of the original, making it a near-perfect conversion. Rally-X has been included in several Namco compilations including Namco History Vol. 2 (1997), Microsoft Revenge of Arcade (1998), Namco Museum Battle Collection (2005), Namco Museum 50th Anniversary (2005), Namco Museum Virtual Arcade (2008), and Namco Museum Megamix (2010). In 1996, Rally-X was re-released for arcades as part of Namco Classic Collection Vol. 2. It has also appeared in several Namco "plug'n play" game controllers from Jakks Pacific. Rally-X is also included in both Pac-Man’s Arcade Party (2010) and Pac-Man’s Pixel Bash (2019). In 2021, Rally-X saw a digital release under the Arcade Archives label for the Nintendo Switch and PlayStation 4.

== Reception ==
Reception

Review scores
Publication	Score
AllGame	2.5/5
Eurogamer	8/10

The game was a commercial success in Japan, where it became the sixth highest-grossing arcade game of 1980, and Namco's third highest that year below Pac-Man and Galaxian. In contrast, the game was not as successful in North America. By July 1981, Midway had sold 2,500 Rally-X arcade machines, significantly less than the company's other releases at the time. Dick Pearson of RePlay highlighted its colorful visuals and sound effects in a preview from the tradeshow, comparing its gameplay favorably to Pac-Man and writing that it "shows promise as an entertaining maze video game". A writer for Cash Box provided similar comments, further applauding its scoring system and layer of strategy. In 1991, Gamest listed it as being a "masterpiece" alongside New Rally-X, and believed its underwhelming critical and commercial reception was attributed to it being ahead of its time. Staff considered it a successor to Head On, as well as being influential for the maze genre.

In his review of Namco Museum Vol. 1, Computer and Video Games Ed Lomas said Rally-X was fun at first, but quickly became repetitive and suffered from poor movement controls. Brett Alan Weiss of AllGame was similarly mixed in his review from 1998, where he claimed its only noteworthy aspects were the "merciless" difficulty and smoke screen weapon. Weiss found its visuals and sounds to only be "merely functional", and secondary to the difficult level. IGN staff contrasted their statements, and believed Rally-X, like the other games in Vol. 1, holds up well today. It was listed among the greatest arcade games by Gamest readers in 1998, being selected for its innovation and evolution on the traditional gameplay of maze chase action games.

Rally-X has continued to earn praise in retrospective commentary. Writing for Eurogamer in 2007, Sir Clive believed the game was unique enough to discern it from Pac-Man and similar maze-chasers. He identified its high difficulty and design, and that it gave an adrenaline rush to players. Clive commented: "When you are playing the game, just imaging a yellow circle where your car is and repeat the mantra 'wakawakawakawaka' as you play and you will start to see just how huge this game could have been". Retro Gamer staff were positive towards its colorful graphics, smooth scrolling, and increasing level of difficulty, writing it makes for a unique derivative of Pac-Man and was worth playing in its own right. Phosphor Dot Fossils's Earl Green found its gameplay addictive and commented on its similarities to Pac-Man. Green believes Rally-X failed to catch on as it lacked Pac-Man's abstract characters and design, and was too similar to other driving games from the era.

== Legacy ==
Rally-X is credited as being one of the first games to feature continuous background music and a bonus round, predating Sega's Carnival, which was released in June 1980.

In response to player feedback from the original, Namco released a sequel named New Rally-X in 1981, which was designed to improve on the original's flaws and make it easier for newcomers. It also adds a "Lucky Flag" that awards bonus points based on how much fuel remains. New Rally-X has been seen as an improvement over the original and has been ported to several consoles and compilations, such as mobile phones and the Xbox 360. Rally-X Arrangement, included in Namco Classic Collection Vol. 2 (1996), is a remake of the original that implements power-ups and new enemy types. A similar game titled New Rally-X Arrangement is included in Namco Museum Battle Collection (2005). The 2007 Wii game Namco Museum Remix and its 2010 update Namco Museum Megamix include a 3D remake named Rally-X Remix, which replaces the player's car with Pac-Man. Namco Bandai Games released a sequel for iOS in 2011, Rally-X Rumble, that uses a neon-inspired graphical motif in the style of Pac-Man Championship Edition DX (2010) and is designed as a multiplayer battle royale game.

The Special Flag has become a symbol for Namco and has made frequent appearances in games, usually as an item that awards an extra life. It has appeared in games such as Xevious (1983), Gaplus (1984), Tinkle Pit (1994), Tales of Phantasia (1995), Xevious Resurrection (2009), Super Smash Bros. for Nintendo 3DS & Wii U (2014), and Super Smash Bros. Ultimate (2018). Namco Bandai's "game consulting" service, which provides insight on the company's design philosophies to clients, is named Special Flag, as are its indoor restaurants located in its VR Zone amusement centers. Merchandise such as enamel pins and keychains featuring the Special Flag have also been produced.
