= Rompers (video game) =

1989 video game

- Advertising flyer
- Developer: Namco
- Publisher: Namco
- Designer: Akira Usukura
- Composer: Yoshie Takayanagi
- Platform: Arcade
- Release: JP: February 1989
- Genres: Maze
- Modes: Single-player, multiplayer
- Arcade system: Namco System 1

Rompers (Note: Japanese: ロンパーズ, Hepburn: Ronpāzu) is a 1989 maze video game developed and published by Namco for arcades. It was released only in Japan in February 1989. It was designed by Akira Usukura, who had designed Splatterhouse the previous year.

== Gameplay ==
Screenshot

The player controls Chap (チャップ, Chappu), a gardener wearing a straw hat, who must collect all the keys in 61 maze-inspired gardens in order to rescue his girlfriend, Rumina (ルミナ, Rumina); he can push the walls in the gardens over to crush the various enemies that pursue him, but they shall immediately be resurrected in the form of eggs which hatch after a few seconds. Each round also has a preset time limit to ensure that the player does not dawdle - and once it runs out, a green-haired female vampire known as Tsukaima (使い魔, Tsukaima) (who cannot be crushed by the walls) shows up and pursues Chap for his blood, as the Yamaha YM2151-generated song (and all the enemies) speed up. The game's enemies include white blobs known as Pyokorin (ピョコリン, Pyokorin), pink Triceratops-esque creatures known as Kerara (ケララ, Kerara) which can breathe flames, armadillos known as Gororin (ゴロリン, Gororin) which can roll over Chap, purple seals known as Todorin (トドリン, Todorin) which can breathe ice, sponges known as Bekabeka (ベカベカ, Bekabeka), which can push walls onto Chap, turquoise blobs known as Fumajime Pyokorin (ふまじめピョコリン, Fumajime Pyokorin), which occasionally pause to take a long drag on their cigarettes, helmet-wearing creatures known as Nachibo (ナチ坊, Nachibō), which take two crushes to kill, wolves known as Taggus (タッグス, Taggasu) which can throw bombs at Chap, spiders known as Oogumo (オオグモ, Oogumo), which can spin webs for Chap to run into - and this game's main antagonist, an evil scientist named Gurerin (グレリン, Gurerin) who only appears on the final round, where players not only have to collect all the keys, but also push the walls onto his four clones (two of whom can breathe fire, but the other two can breathe ice).

A cutscene called "The Rompers Show" also appears after every tenth round, and once Chap has rescued Rumina at the end of the game, they both go back to free Tsukaima (who, ironically, is trapped under a wall, given that she cannot be crushed by them in the game), and wrap her feet up with bandages; Chap then starts to carry Tsukaima off on his back, which angers Rumina.

== Release ==
At the time of its release, Rompers was never ported to any home video game consoles nor given an official North American release, possibly due to one of the enemies, Fumajime Pyokorin, being involved in drug use, and the Japanese voice samples; the game's soundtrack was released in two compilation discs known as Namco Video Game Graffiti Volume 5, and Namco Video Game Graffiti Volume 6, which included soundtracks for other Namco games as well.

The first official home conversion of the game was in Namco Museum Encore, the series' only Japanese-exclusive installment which also featured Wonder Momo and was released on the PlayStation. In 2009, Rompers was released on the Wii's Virtual Console in Japan.

Hamster Corporation released the game outside Japan for the first time, excluding physical arcade machines, as part of their Arcade Archives series for the Nintendo Switch and PlayStation 4.

== Reception ==
In Japan, Game Machine listed Rompers on their March 15, 1989 issue as being the seventh most-successful table arcade game of the year.
