= Warpman =

1985 video game

- Box art
- Developer: Namco
- Publisher: Namco
- Programmer: Shouichi Fukatani
- Platform: Family Computer
- Release: JP: July 12, 1985
- Genre: Multidirectional shooter
- Modes: Single-player, multiplayer

Warpman (Note: Japanese: ワープマン, Hepburn: Wāpuman) is a 1985 multidirectional shooter video game developed and published by Namco for the Family Computer. It is a sequel to the 1981 arcade game Warp & Warp. It was one of the last games to be programmed by Shouichi Fukatani, programmer of Dig Dug, who died during development. It was released outside Japan for the first time as part of Namco Museum Archives.

== Gameplay ==
The player controls a "Monster Fighter", who must destroy aliens on two different types of levels, the free-movement Space World and the obstacle-filled Maze World. Unlike its predecessor, power-ups are available to advance gameplay alongside new enemy types.
