= Tower of Babel (1986 video game) =

1986 video game

- Famicom box art
- Developer: Namco
- Publisher: Namco
- Programmer: Takashi Fukawa
- Composer: Norio Nakagata
- Platforms: Family Computer, Arcade
- Release: Famicom: JP: July 18, 1986; Arcade: JP: 1986
- Genre: Puzzle-platform
- Mode: Single-player
- Arcade system: Nintendo VS. System

Tower of Babel (Note: Japanese: バベルの塔, Hepburn: Babel no Tō) is a 1986 puzzle-platform video game developed and published by Namco for the Family Computer. It was released in Japan on July 18, 1986. The game's goal is to solve the puzzle of each of the 64 levels of the ancient Tower of Babel and reach the top of the tower. The player controls the protagonist, Indy Borgnine, who must avoid enemies while rearranging L-shaped blocks in order to reach each level's exit.

Development was done by Namco, and the project was planned by Hiroshima Nagashima, who had worked on the company's arcade game Sky Kid (1985), the music was by Norio Nakagata, and the character design was by Hiroshi Fuji. A port to arcades for the Nintendo VS. System, VS. Tower of Babel, was released in 1986 only in Japan.

== Gameplay ==
The player controls Indy Borgnine through 64 levels, using L-shaped blocks and vines in order to reach the exit of each level. On some levels, the exit is blocked by a mask, and there are crystal balls throughout the level. If all of the crystal balls on a level are collected, then the mask covering that level's exit will disappear, and the exit will no longer be blocked. When the exit of a level is reached, a screen is displayed showing the score achieved on that level before the character moves on to the next level. In the top right corner of the screen there is a power count. Lifting an L-shaped block causes the power count to go down by 1. Items will occasionally spawn while the player goes through the tower. The items are:

- Pots (100 points and add 1 to power count)
- Crowns (200 points)
- Jewels (400 points and invincibility; enemies killed while invincible are worth 1000 points)
- Lamps (1000 points and enable Indy Borgnine to pass through L-shaped blocks)
- Stars (increase Indy Borgnine's speed)

== Plot ==
Archaeologist and explorer Indy Borgnine is in search of the fabled Hanging Gardens of Babylon. After reading some lost scriptures, he determines that the only way to see them is to travel to the very top of the 64-story Tower of Babel from the Book of Genesis of the Old Testament. Upon reaching the Tower, he discovers that the only way to access the floors above him are to solve some challenging puzzles involving loose L-shaped blocks that he finds throughout the Tower. To his great surprise, the blocks are capable of balancing very well on top of one another, in order to form staircases.

== Re-releases ==
Tower of Babel was released on the Wii U Virtual Console in 2014, and also included on the Japanese-exclusive Namcot Collection for the Nintendo Switch on 2020. While the game remained exclusive to Japan for several years, it received its first worldwide release on June 5, 2023 via the Nintendo Classics service, under the name Mystery Tower. Hamster Corporation released the arcade version as VS. Mystery Tower outside Japan as part of their Arcade Archives series for the Nintendo Switch and PlayStation 4 in March 2025.
