= Namco Arcade =

2012 video game

- Developer: Namco Bandai Games
- Publisher: Namco Bandai Games
- Platforms: iOS, Android
- Release: iOS: WW: January 26, 2012; Android: WW: June 9, 2015
- Genre: Various
- Mode: Single-player

Namco Arcade (Japanese: ナムコアーケード, Hepburn: Namuko Ākēdo) was a compilation of classic arcade video games, and was made for iOS and Android by Bandai Namco Entertainment.

Namco Arcade was discontinued and removed from both the App Store and Google Play marketplaces on March 15, 2016. Purchased games prior to the shut down of the store can still be played.

== Overview ==
Namco Arcade is a compilation of Namco's classic arcade games. A choice of game is playable, free of charge, once every day. Virtual "Play Coins" could be purchased for additional plays, or games could be purchased permanently until the ability to make in-app purchases were removed on February 16, 2016. Players could access a virtual store, which contained Play Coins, "arcade machines", and cheat toggles. Purchasing a game's "arcade machine" removes the Play Coin requirement for that title for unlimited play.

Additional features included online achievements, cheats, leaderboards, customizable touch screen controls, and alternative backgrounds. The tournament randomly selects a game in which to compete and upload replays.

=== Game list ===
The app launched with Motos, Phozon, The Tower of Druaga, and Xevious. More games were added via app updates through 2012 to 2014. Pac-Land is based on the Japanese version, though it features sprites from the North American version for the Pac-Man family (which are based on the 1982 Pac-Man cartoon).

Title	Release date
Motos	January 26, 2012
Phozon	January 26, 2012
The Tower of Druaga	January 26, 2012
Xevious	January 26, 2012
Pac-Land	March 13, 2012
Pac-Man	March 13, 2012
Rolling Thunder	March 13, 2012
Galaga	April 20, 2012
Starblade	February 28, 2013
Dragon Buster	June 5, 2014
