= New Rally-X =

1981 video game

- Developer: Namco
- Publishers: JP: Namco; NA: Midway Manufacturing
- Designers: Shigeru Yokoyama; Kouichi Tashiro
- Programmer: Kazuo Kurosu
- Composer: Nobuyuki Ohnogi
- Platform: Arcade
- Release: JP/NA: February 1981
- Genre: Maze
- Modes: Single-player, multiplayer
- Arcade system: Rally-X

New Rally-X (Note: Japanese: ニューラリーX, Hepburn: Nyū Rarī-Ekkusu) is a 1981 maze video game developed and published by Namco for arcades. It was released in Japan in February 1981 and in North America by Midway Manufacturing the same month. It is a lightly tweaked version of 1980's Rally-X, with slightly enhanced graphics, easier gameplay, a new soundtrack, and a "Lucky Flag" that gives the player extra points for remaining fuel when collected.

New Rally-X was manufactured in greater numbers and was much more popular in Japan than its predecessor. While the original Rally-X, released under a Midway Games license, was a moderate hit in the United States, Midway only distributed New Rally-X as an upgrade kit for Rally-X cabinets.

== Gameplay ==
Driving with a full tank of fuel

The player controls a blue racing car. The objective is to collect ten yellow flags from the maze before fuel bar runs out. Each round has eight common flags, one "special" flag and one "lucky" flag. The special flag doubles the score of any flags collected afterward until the level ends. The lucky flag, which was not present in the original game, gives bonus points based on how much fuel the player has.

Enemy red cars attempt to ram the player's vehicle, causing one life to be lost. A button releases a smoke screen, at the cost of fuel, making the red cars unable to move for a short time if they run over the smoke screens. Boulders in the maze are deadly if collided with.

The third level and every fourth after that is a bonus round, labelled "Challenging Stage", where red cars remain still until the player's fuel runs out.

== Reception ==
Douglass C. Perry of IGN gave the Xbox 360 re-release a 4/10 score, criticizing its outdated gameplay.

== Legacy ==
A version of New Rally-X is the load-up game in the PlayStation Portable game Ridge Racer. It was also included in Namco Museum Battle Collection for the PSP, along with an entirely new "Arrangement" version of it which has updated graphics, music, and new gameplay mechanics. The game was also released on the Microsoft Xbox 360 Live Arcade service on December 27, 2006, and on the Wii Virtual Console in Japan on October 6, 2009. In addition, it has also been included in several editions of the Namco plug-n-play game series, from Jakks Pacific. A version known as New Rally-X S (the "S" stands for "Special") was also released on Facebook. In November 2010, it was included in Namco Museum Megamix for the Wii. Hamster Corporation released the game as part of the Arcade Archives series for the Nintendo Switch and PlayStation 4 in February 2022.
