= Rolling Thunder 3 =

1993 video game

- Developer: Now Production
- Publisher: Namco Hometek
- Producer: R2-Unit
- Designer: Masaru Moriya
- Programmer: Paddock Tondabayashi
- Composers: Rose; Dick
- Series: Rolling Thunder
- Platform: Genesis
- Release: NA: July 1993
- Genre: Run and gun
- Mode: Single-player

Rolling Thunder 3 is a 1993 run and gun video game published by Namco released for the Sega Genesis. It is the third and final game in the Rolling Thunder series after Rolling Thunder and Rolling Thunder 2.

The game was made specifically for the Genesis, unlike the previous two games in the series. Also unlike its predecessors, Rolling Thunder 3 was released only in North America.

== Plot ==
The game's plot is set around the same time period as its predecessor Rolling Thunder 2. With WCPO agents Albatross and Leila assigned to tracking down Gimdo criminal organization, a new Rolling Thunder agent codenamed Jay is assigned to track down Geldra's second-in-command, Dread (a green skinned humanoid resembling Maboo from the first game). Jay is assisted via radio by a contact named Ellen, who provides him with mission objectives. The story is presented in a more cinematic fashion than the previous games, featuring animated cutscenes between stages and on-screen text dialogue between the characters. There are only a couple of spoken dialogs in the game, all of which are synthesized voices.

== Gameplay ==
Jay dispatching enemies with a flamethrower.

The game maintains the "shoot-and-take cover" formula of the previous installments. In Rolling Thunder 3, the player progresses through ten levels and three secret areas (including an abandoned version of the original game's first stage) by shooting hostile enemies, replenishing ammo by entering specially marked doors, and dodging or crouching under enemy fire by hiding behind objects such as crates. Unlike Rolling Thunder 2, the game features only a single-player mode.

Rolling Thunder 3 offers its fair share of new features to the series. Players now have the option to select one weapon from a total nine before beginning each level, including submachine gun, shotgun, bazooka, flamethrower, a laser gun similar to the ones in the Genesis version of Rolling Thunder 2, three types of hand grenades (regular, flash and cracker) or a "cannon" that lobs incendiary grenades. When the player's starting special weapon is expended in one stage, it cannot be chosen again in later stages. The player may refuse to choose any, in which case Jay's special weapon would be a dagger. Special weapons are also found behind specially marked doors in most missions. When picked up, they replace the starting special weapon.

There are now two separate fire buttons, one for the standard pistol and the other for the special weapon. The player also has the ability to shoot at angles. As they progress through the game, players will also be introduced to fast-paced vehicle stages, controlling Jay as he rides either a motorcycle on slick highways or jet-skis across rapid waters.

The player's health bar consists of three health units instead of one, giving Jay the ability to endure more hits before dying, although some shots can deplete two health units instead of one. In addition, some enemies fire a hail of bullets in rapid succession. When Jay dies, the game allows the player to restart from the exact position they died at, rather than forcing them to continue from a check point or the beginning of the stage as the prequels had done. If the player chooses to start the game without a starting special weapon, the room that replenishes that weapon will instead add a health unit.

The game does not require the player to complete the stages within a time limit; therefore, the game features no time bonus pickups, but taking too long summons a sniper who begins shooting at Jay.

As with the console versions of the previous games, upon completing the game, the player is given a password that enables them to replay the game on a harder difficulty level that features a slightly extended ending. There is another hidden password that replaces Jay with the female agent Ellen. She does not have any cutscenes and the ending remains unchanged.

== Reception ==
Reception

Review score
Publication	Score
Electronic Gaming Monthly	(6.4/10)
