= Pac-Mania =

1987 video game

- Japanese arcade flyer
- Developer: Namco (Note: Amiga, Amstrad CPC, Archimedes, Atari ST, Commodore 64, MSX and ZX Spectrum versions developed by Krisalis Software; X68000 version developed by SPS; NES version developed by Westwood Associates; Mega Drive/Genesis version developed by Sculptured Software; Master System version developed by TecMagik.)
- Publishers: Namco: Arcade; JP: Namco; NA: Atari Games; Amiga, CPC, Atari ST, C64, MSX, ZX Spectrum; Grandslam Entertainments; X68000; Sharp Corporation; NES, Mega Drive/Genesis; Tengen; Archimedes; Domark; Master System; TecMagik
- Director: Tōru Iwatani
- Programmer: Taro Shimizu
- Artist: Akira Usukura
- Composers: Junko Ozawa: Amiga, CPC, Archimedes, Atari ST, C64, MSX, ZX Spectrum; Ben Daglish; Mega Drive/Genesis; Paul Webb; NES; Paul S. Mudra
- Series: Pac-Man
- Platform: Arcade: Amiga, Atari ST, Commodore 64, Amstrad CPC, MSX, ZX Spectrum, X68000, MSX2, NES, Mega Drive/Genesis, Master System, Acorn Archimedes
- Release: November 1987: Arcade; JP: November 1987; NA/EU: December 1987 Amiga, Atari ST; EU: October 1988 C64; EU: Late 1988 CPC, MSX, Spectrum; EU: December 1988 X68000; JP: Early 1989 MSX2; JP: June 1989 NES; NA: Late 1990 Master System; EU: July 1991 Mega Drive/Genesis; NA: September 1991; EU: 1991 Archimedes; EU: 1991
- Genre: Maze
- Modes: Single-player, multiplayer
- Arcade system: Namco System 1

Pac-Mania (Note: Japanese: パックマニア, Hepburn: Pakku-Mania) is a 1987 maze video game developed and published by Namco for arcades. It was released by Atari Games in North America. In the game, the player controls Pac-Man as he must eat all of the dots while avoiding the colored ghosts that chase him in the maze. Eating large flashing "Power Pellets" will allow Pac-Man to eat the ghosts for bonus points, which lasts for a short period of time. A new feature to this game allows Pac-Man to jump over the ghosts to evade capture. It is the ninth title in the Pac-Man video game series and was the last one developed for arcades up until the release of Pac-Man Arrangement in 1996. Development was directed by Pac-Man creator Tōru Iwatani.

Pac-Mania gained a highly positive critical reception for its originality and gameplay. It was nominated for "Best Coin-Op Conversion of the Year" at the Golden Joystick Awards in 1987, although it lost to Taito's Operation Wolf. Pac-Mania was ported to several home consoles and computers, including the Atari ST, MSX2, Sega Genesis and Nintendo Entertainment System, the last of which being published by Tengen. Several Pac-Man and Namco video game collections also included the game.

== Gameplay ==
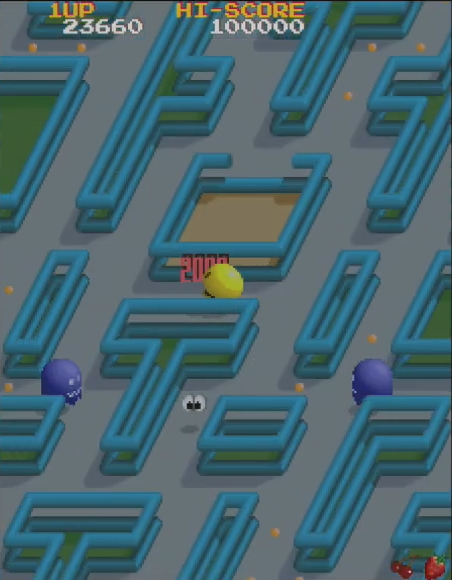
Screenshot of the arcade version, showing the Pac-Man's Park level

Pac-Mania is a maze game viewed from an oblique perspective, with gameplay similar to the franchise's original installment. The player controls Pac-Man, who must eat all of the pellets in each stage while avoiding five colored ghosts: Blinky (red), Pinky (pink), Inky (cyan), Clyde (orange) and Sue (purple). Eating large Power Pellets will cause the ghosts to turn blue and flee, allowing Pac-Man to eat them for bonus points and send them to the house in the middle of the stage. Clearing the stage of dots and pellets will allow Pac-Man to move to the next. Mazes scroll both horizontally and vertically, and the left and right edges of some layouts wrap around to each other. Touching a non-vulnerable ghost costs the player one life.

New to this game is the ability to jump over the ghosts, allowing Pac-Man to evade capture. Later rounds of the game introduce two new ghosts, Funky (green) and Spunky (gray), who also have the ability to jump. While Pac-Man can still barely jump over Funky, it is impossible to jump over Spunky. Eating a certain number of pellets will cause a bonus item to appear in the middle of the stage, which can be eaten for points. Some of these bonus items are called Special Items, which are items from later levels, or are Red and Green Power Pellets. Red Power Pellets double the point values of blue ghosts (this bonus is lost if Pac-Man loses a life), and Green Power Pellets temporarily increase Pac-Man's speed. If the player takes too long to clear a stage, Pac-Man's jumping power begins to decrease steadily until it is entirely lost.

Four different mazes are available: Block Town, Pac-Man's Park, Sandbox Land, and Jungly Steps. Upon completing a set number of rounds in each maze, the player progresses to the next; after playing through all four, the cycle restarts. At the beginning of the game, the player can choose to start in any of the first three mazes and will earn a score bonus for choosing either Pac-Man's Park or Sandbox Land and completing the first round in it.

The game ends when the player has either lost all lives or (depending on 11 rounds, 25 rounds, or endless) cycled through all four mazes a set number of times.

== Ports ==
Pac-Mania arrived on all of the major 8-bit and 16-bit systems in Europe in 1988, which were Amiga and Atari ST in October, Commodore 64 later that year, and Amstrad CPC, MSX and ZX Spectrum in December. The conversions were designed and ported by Teque Software, then composed of the duo Peter Harrap and Shaun Hollingworth, and the games were published by Grandslam Entertainment. Grandslam also developed an Acorn Archimedes port, which was published by Domark in 1991. Sharp Corporation developed and published a port of the game for its X68000 computer in early 1989. Namco also released an MSX2 port of the game in mid-June that year.

Pac-Mania was later ported to the Nintendo Entertainment System in late 1990 and the Master System and Sega Genesis in 1991 by Tengen. The Genesis version was released in North America and Europe, while the NES version was exclusive to North America and the Master System port (developed and published by TecMagik) was exclusive to Europe. The Genesis port was outsourced to Sculptured Software, while the NES port was outsourced to Westwood Studios.

== Reception ==
Reception

Review scores
Publication	Score						
Publication	Amiga	Arcade	Atari ST	C64	Master System	Sega Genesis	ZX
ACE	775		727				
Amiga Computing	85%						
Crash							82%
Computer and Video Games			83%				87%
Sinclair User							79%
The Games Machine (UK)	92%		89%	87%			86%
Your Sinclair							8/10
Zero					90%		
Zzap!64	93%						
Commodore User		9/10					
Console XS					88%		
Entertainment Weekly						B−	
MegaTech						70%	
ST/Amiga Format	80%						
The One			84%				

In Japan, Game Machine listed Pac-Mania as the fifth most successful table arcade unit of December 1987. In North America, Atari sold 1,412 arcade cabinets in 1987, earning about $2.82 million ($8 million adjusted for inflation) in cabinet sales.

Entertainment Weekly gave the Genesis version a B− in 1991.

Polish magazine Top Secret gave the NES version 5 out of 5 checks, commending the music, graphics, the comical cut scenes and the ability to jump.

The game was runner-up in the category of Best Coin-Op Conversion of the Year at the Golden Joystick Awards, behind Operation Wolf.

== Legacy ==
The arcade version of Pac-Mania appeared in Namco Museum Volume 5, the 2001 Namco Museum release, Namco Museum: 50th Anniversary and Namco Museum Virtual Arcade. In 2001, it was one of the games included in Pac-Man Collection for the Game Boy Advance. Later in 2002, the arcade version was included as an unlockable bonus in Pac-Man World 2. In 2007, Pac-Mania was also released in Namco Museum Remix with Pac & Pal, Pac 'n Roll, Super Pac-Man and other non-Pac-Man games. It was re-released in 2010 as part of the follow-up compilation Namco Museum Megamix, along with 17 other Namco arcade games and six remix games, five of which appeared in Namco Museum Remix.

The game was released for the Wii's Virtual Console in 2009. In 2010, the design of Pac-Man and the ghosts from Pac-Mania appear in Pac-Man Championship Edition DX, and the game itself was released for iOS devices. Pac-Mania was also re-released as part of the Pac-Man's Arcade Party arcade machine in 2010 for Pac-Man's 30th anniversary. In February 2014, it was included in the Pac-Man Museum for PlayStation 3, Xbox 360 and Windows. In 2018, it was included in the Pac-Man's Pixel Bash arcade cabinet, along with other Pac-Man, and different Namco games. The game is included in the 2022 compilation title Pac-Man Museum+ for the Nintendo Switch, PlayStation 4, Windows, and Xbox One. Hamster Corporation released the game as part of their Arcade Archives series for the Nintendo Switch and PlayStation 4 in December 2022.

The music from Pac-Man's Park was later used in Pac-Man and the Ghostly Adventures as the "power up" theme for "Pac" (the show's version of Pac-Man). The same theme, along with Block Town's music, was remixed and used in Super Smash Bros. for Nintendo 3DS and Wii U and later Super Smash Bros. Ultimate.
