= Hopping Mappy =

1986 video game

- Japanese promotional sales flyer
- Developer: Game Studio
- Publisher: Namco
- Series: Mappy
- Platform: Arcade
- Release: JP: March 1986
- Genre: Action
- Modes: Single-player, multiplayer

Hopping Mappy (Note: Japanese: ホッピングマッピー, Hepburn: Hoppingu Mappī) is a 1986 action video game developed by Game Studio and published by Namco for arcades. It was only released in Japan in March 1986. It is the sequel to Mappy, which was released three years prior. The game was released on the Wii's Virtual Console in Japan on June 2, 2009. Hamster Corporation released the game outside Japan for the first time as part of their Arcade Archives series for the Nintendo Switch and PlayStation 4 in January 2022.

== Gameplay ==
Screenshot of the game

In Hopping Mappy, players control Mappy, as he bounces on a pogo stick to run circles around pink cats, called Meowkies, who patrol either vertically or horizontally. There is also Goro, a cat who patrols in a zigzag pattern, but he must take occasional breaks. There are eight treasures that a player must grab to complete a round, except on the bonus round where the player will just want to collect all the balloons that he can. The main intrigue here is getting past a blockade of Meowkies. The player controls are simple - he can bounce in any of the four directions, the only places he can land are the centers of the checkerboard squares (making for few locations overall), and he will move at the same speed as the cats. If the player pushes the accelerator button and runs around, he will go twice as fast. If the player takes too long to complete the level, a "Hurry Up" warning will appear and the cats will speed up, matching Mappy's accelerated speed. If the player takes too long again after the warning, a blue Gosenzo Coin will appear and chase the player. This coin is faster than Mappy and will eventually kill the player unless he collects the final treasure before it reaches him.

== Reception ==
In Japan, Game Machine listed Hopping Mappy as being the 13th most-popular arcade game of April 1986.

== Legacy ==
The game is included in the arcade compilation title Pac-Man's Pixel Bash. A theme based on the game, was released as free DLC for Pac-Man 99 post-launch, featuring visuals and sound from the game.
