= Pole Position II =

1983 video game

- North American arcade flyer
- Developer: Namco
- Publishers: JP/CHN/EU: Namco; NA: Atari, Inc.; 7800; Atari Corporation
- Series: Pole Position
- Platforms: Arcade, Super Cassette Vision, Atari 7800, Commodore 64, MS-DOS
- Release: Arcade: JP/NA: November 1983; WW: 1983; 7800: May 15, 1986
- Genre: Racing
- Mode: Single-player
- Arcade system: Namco Pole Position

Pole Position II (Note: Japanese: ポールポジションII, Hepburn: Pōru Pojishon Tsū) is a 1983 racing video game developed and published by Namco for arcades. It is the sequel to the 1982 game Pole Position. Atari, Inc. released the game in North America. Atari also released a port as the pack-in game for its Atari 7800 ProSystem in 1986. Pole Position arcade machines can be converted to Pole Position II by swapping several chips.

The gameplay is the same as in the original Pole Position with three additional tracks to choose from. Like its predecessor, Pole Position II was a major commercial success in arcades, becoming the highest-grossing arcade game of 1984 in the United States, and remaining among the annual highest-grossing arcade games in Japan and the US through 1987.

== Differences from the original ==
Approaching two other cars in a turn (arcade)

The player initially chooses one of four tracks using the steering wheel: Fuji Speedway (from the first game), Test (resembling Indianapolis Motor Speedway), Seaside (resembling the 1982 United States Grand Prix West circuit in Long Beach), and Suzuka Circuit.

The cars have a different color scheme, the explosions now show debris, there are several new billboards, and there is a new opening theme song. The timer is displayed as "TIME" in the Japanese version (as it was in the original game), and it is displayed as "UNIT" in the American release.

== Reception ==
In Japan, Game Machine listed Pole Position II as the second most successful upright/cockpit arcade cabinet of November 1983, before topping the charts in December 1983. It was later Japan's third highest-grossing upright/cockpit arcade game of 1986 (below Sega's Hang-On and Space Harrier), and the fifth highest-grossing upright/cockpit arcade game of 1987.

In the United States, Pole Position II topped the RePlay arcade chart for software conversion kits in December 1983, with the original Pole Position topping the upright cabinet chart the same month. It topped the RePlay software conversion kit charts for six months into 1984, through January, February, March and April up until May. It also topped the Play Meter conversion kit charts for street locations during July–August 1984. Pole Position II became the highest-grossing arcade game of 1984 in the United States, just above the original Pole Position, which was previously the highest-grossing arcade game of 1983. Pole Position II was later one of the top five highest-grossing arcade games of 1985, and the sixth highest-grossing arcade game of 1986.

Gene Lewin of Play Meter reviewed the arcade game, scoring it 9 out of 10. Computer and Video Games reviewed the Atari 7800 version, giving it an 84% score.

== Legacy ==
Pole Position II has been re-released as part of various Namco Museum compilations, but the two active permanent circuits were removed (because of licensing issues with both Toyota, which owns Fuji Speedway, and Honda, which owns Suzuka Circuit, but no licensing issues with the Grand Prix Association of Long Beach) and similar looking circuits, Namco Circuit and Wonder Circuit (after Namco's Wonder series of Japanese theme parks) were added respectively. In Namco Museum Virtual Arcade, they were renamed Blue and Orange respectively, even though neither track features the colors, although the layouts were similar.

In 2006, Namco Networks released Pole Position II for mobile phones.

Hamster Corporation released the game as part of their Arcade Archives series for the Nintendo Switch and PlayStation 4 in December 2023.
