= King & Balloon =

1980 video game

- North American arcade flyer
- Developer: Namco
- Publishers: JP: Namco; NA: Game Plan
- Designers: Shigeru Yokoyama; Kazunori Sawano; Shigeichi Ishimura
- Composer: Nobuyuki Ohnogi
- Platforms: Arcade, MSX, Mobile phone
- Release: Arcade: JP: October 1980; NA: October 1981; MSX: JP: February 28, 1984
- Genre: Fixed shooter
- Modes: Single-player, multiplayer
- Arcade system: Namco Galaxian

King & Balloon (Note: Japanese: キング&バルーン, Hepburn: Kingu & Barūn) is a 1980 fixed shooter video game developed and published by Namco for arcades. It was released in Japan in October 1980 and in North America by Game Plan in October 1981. It runs upon the Namco Galaxian hardware, based on the Zilog Z80 microprocessor, with an extra microprocessor to drive a DAC for speech; it was one of the first games to have speech synthesis. An MSX port was released in Japan in 1984.

== Gameplay ==
Screenshot

The player controls two green men with an orange cannon, stationed on the parapet of a castle, that fires at a fleet of hot air balloons. Below the cannon, the King moves slowly back and forth as the balloons return fire and dive toward him. If a balloon reaches the ground, it will sit there until the King walks into it, at which time it lifts off with him. The player must then shoot the balloon to free the King, who will parachute safely to the ground. At times, two or more diving balloons can combine to form a single larger one, which awards extra points and splits apart when hit.

The cannon is destroyed by collision with balloons or their shots, but is replaced after a brief delay with no effect on the number of remaining lives. One life is lost when a balloon carries the King off the top of the screen; the game ends when all lives are lost. As in Galaxian, the round number stops increasing at round 48.

=== Voice ===
The King speaks when he is captured ("HELP!"), when he is rescued ("THANK YOU"), and when he is carried away ("BYE BYE!"). The balloons make the same droning sound as the aliens from Galaxian, released in the previous year, and the cannon's shots also make the same sound as those of the player's ship (the "Galaxip") from the same game.

In the original Japanese version of the game, the King speaks English with a heavy Japanese accent, saying "herupu" ("help!"), "sankyū" ("thank you"), and "baibai" ("bye bye!"), and the voices themselves were done by Kazunori Sawano and Atsuko Sugisaki. The U.S. version of the game features a different voice for the King without the Japanese accent.

== Legacy ==
King & Balloon was later featured in Namco Museum Encore for the PlayStation, as an exclusive release for Japan. It made its North American console debut on Namco Museum Battle Collection for the PSP, in which the player could choose the King's voice (original Japanese or later U.S. version) after unlocking the manic settings. It also appeared in Namco Museum Virtual Arcade for the Xbox 360, as well as Namco Museum Megamix for the Wii. Hamster Corporation released the game as part of their Arcade Archives series for the Nintendo Switch and PlayStation 4 in July 2023.
