= Rolling Thunder (video game) =

1986 video game

- Japanese arcade flyer
- Developer: Namco (Note: Home computer versions developed by Tiertex; NES version developed by Arc System Works.)
- Publishers: JP/EU: Namco; NA: Atari Games
- Composer: Junko Ozawa
- Series: Rolling Thunder
- Platforms: Arcade, ZX Spectrum, Amiga, Atari ST, Amstrad CPC, Commodore 64, NES
- Release: December 1986: Arcade; JP: December 1986; EU: January 1987; NA: February 1987 ZX Spectrum; UK: December 1987 Amiga, Atari ST, C64, CPC; EU: 1988 NES; JP: March 17, 1989; NA: October 1989
- Genre: Run and gun
- Modes: Single-player, multiplayer
- Arcade system: Namco System 86

Rolling Thunder (Note: Japanese: ローリングサンダー, Hepburn: Rōringu Sandā) is a 1986 run and gun video game developed and published by Namco for arcades. It was released by Atari Games in North America. The player takes control of a secret agent who must rescue his female partner from a terrorist organization. Rolling Thunder was a commercial success in arcades, and was released for various home computer platforms in 1987 and the Nintendo Entertainment System in 1989. The original arcade game has been included in various classic game compilations as well. It influenced later arcade action franchises such as Shinobi and Time Crisis, which borrowed mechanics such as taking cover behind crates.

== Gameplay ==
Arcade version

The player controls Albatross, a member of the WCPO's (World Crime Police Organization) "Rolling Thunder" espionage unit. Albatross's mission is to save a missing female agent named Leila Blitz from a secret society named Geldra located in New York.

Albatross must travel through two different segments or "stories", each composed of five stages, for a total of ten stages. Depending on the DIP switch settings, the player has the option to skip any of the first four stages and start at any point in "Story 1". On each stage, the player can enter doors to hide and take cover from enemies, and he can use crates or other obstacles to take cover from enemy fire. The player can jump over crates or jump up to higher or lower floors with rails, including stairs. The stages in "Story 2" are essentially harder versions of their "Story 1" counterparts, featuring more traps and different enemy placement. At the end of each stage, scenes from Leila's capture and ensuing torture are shown on an in-game large monitor screen.

The player begins the game armed with a standard-issue pistol, which can be replaced with a submachine gun (that appears based on the distinctive real life Beretta M12) that allows for continuous firing by holding down the shoot button. The player can find ammunition for either weapon by entering doors which are marked "bullets" or "arms". If the player runs out of machine gun ammo, they will switch back to the pistol. However, if the pistol runs out of ammo as well, then the player can only fire a single slow "chaser" bullet on-screen at a time until more ammo is acquired. The player can only take two physical hits from the enemy, as a single hit drains half of the life meter; the player is killed instantly when struck by a projectile attack such as enemy bullets or lasers, time runs out, or when falling without a floor.

The main enemies are hooded soldiers known as Maskers. Their various outfits and colors determine their strength and attack pattern respectively. Some Maskers only throw grenades, and others will shoot while kneeling. Other enemies include ninjas, mutated bats known as Gelzos, panthers, shrieking yellow creatures known as Blogas, and lava men. At the end of the final stage, the player must battle the Geldra leader Maboo to rescue Leila and complete the mission.

== Release ==
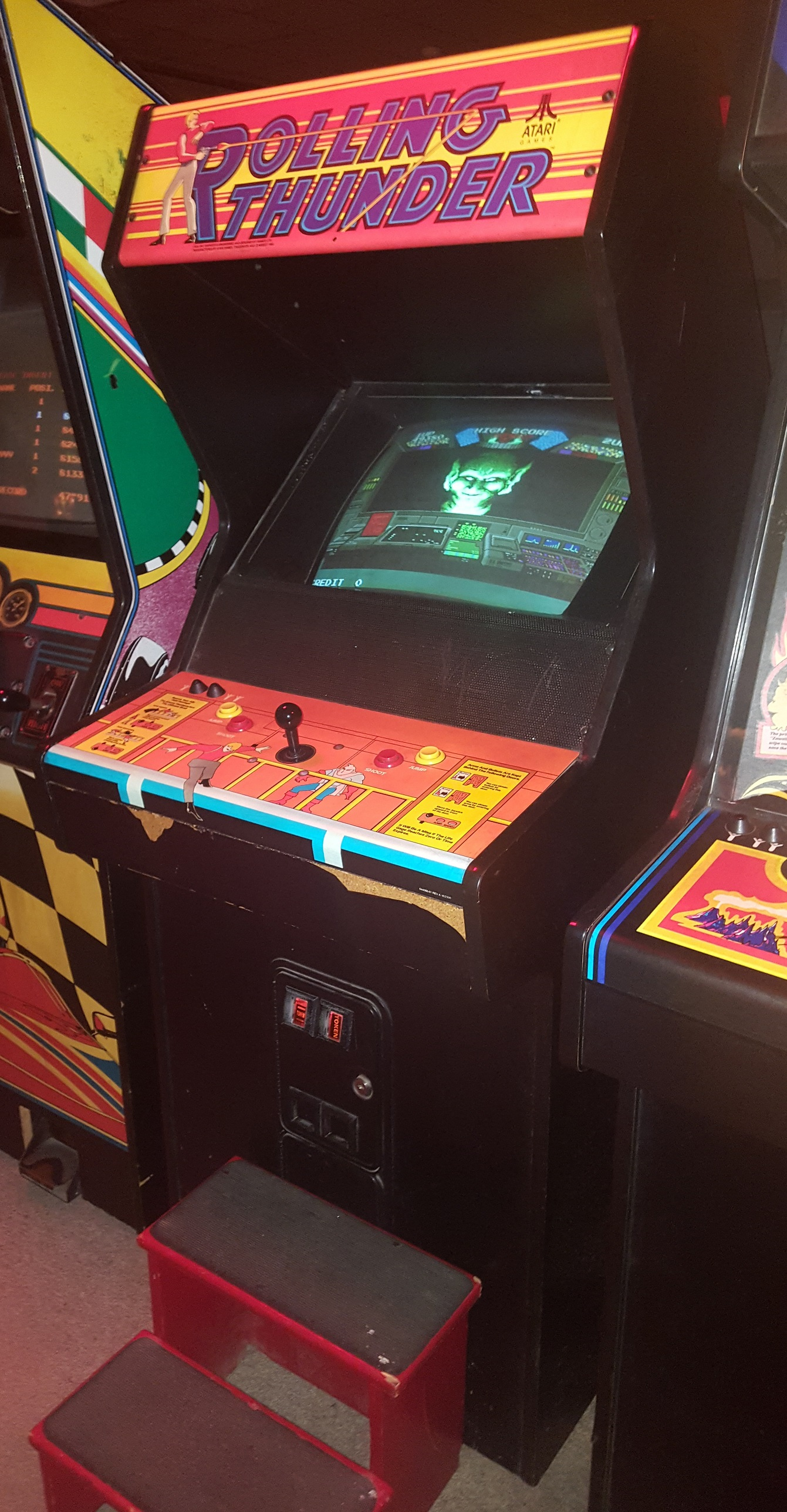
Upright arcade cabinet

Rolling Thunder was released in Japan by Namco in December 1986. Namco debuted the game internationally at the 1987 Amusement Trades Exhibition International (ATEI) show, held at Olympia London in January. The game was released in North America in February 1987 by Atari Games.

In 1988, U.S. Gold released home computer versions of Rolling Thunder in Europe for the Amstrad CPC, Commodore 64, ZX Spectrum, Amiga and Atari ST. These versions were developed by Tiertex. Only the Commodore 64 version has some different colors for the outfit of the Maskers; in the Amiga, Atari ST, and Amstrad CPC versions, the Maskers have the same colors. The ZX Spectrum version is almost monochrome, but has faster gameplay.

On March 17, 1989, Namco released a home version of Rolling Thunder for the Family Computer in Japan. This version was localized for the Nintendo Entertainment System in North America and released in October 1989 by Tengen without a license from Nintendo. The Famicom/NES version features a few minor changes and additions from the arcade version, such as a password feature, hidden bonuses, and a harder second mission accessible by inputting a password given to the player for completing the normal mission. Namco's Famicom version of Rolling Thunder has an onboard sound chip using the extra sound channels of the cartridge slot.

An Atari Lynx conversion of Rolling Thunder was announced in a Lynx catalog, with a scheduled May 1992 release date, but was later canceled.

The original arcade version is featured in Namco Museum Encore for the PlayStation, Namco Museum Battle Collection for the PlayStation Portable, in Namco Museum Virtual Arcade for the Xbox 360, and in Namco Museum 50th Anniversary for PlayStation 2, GameCube, Xbox, Game Boy Advance, and IBM PC compatibles. The arcade version was released for the Wii's Virtual Console in Japan on July 21, 2009, and as part of the Pac-Man's Arcade Party 30th Anniversary arcade machine in 2010. In March 2012, it was added to the Namco Arcade iOS app. It was also released as part of the Namco Museum compilation for Nintendo Switch. Hamster Corporation released the game as part of their Arcade Archives series for the Nintendo Switch and PlayStation 4.

== Reception ==
In Japan, Game Machine listed Rolling Thunder among the most popular arcade games in February 1987. In the United States, the game was one of the top four highest-grossing arcade games of 1987. The arcade game was a commercial success in Europe.

Upon release, Clare Edgeley wrote a very short review of the arcade game in Computer and Video Games, saying that the gameplay in Rolling Thunder is "rather slow" and that she wouldn't recommend it to anyone "keen on a bit of fast action".

Your Sinclair magazine reviewed the ZX Spectrum version in February 1988, giving it a highly positive review and rating it 9 of 10.

In 1996, Next Generation ranked the arcade version as the 43rd game of all time, citing the "long-legged" characters, "wonderfully" designed levels, weapons, the use of panthers as enemies, character's ability to duck behind boxes, the constant need to jump from the floor to raised platforms, and "great" music.

== Legacy ==
Rolling Thunder was followed by a sequel for the arcades titled Rolling Thunder 2 in 1990. A port for the Sega Genesis and Mega Drive was released in 1991, followed by Rolling Thunder 3 for the Genesis in North America in 1993.

A theme based on Rolling Thunder, featuring several characters from the game is featured in Pac-Man 99, as special DLC.

Rolling Thunder spawned several clones in the late 1980s. Sega's Shinobi (1987) upon release drew comparisons to Rolling Thunder, as well as a copy from the South Korean company SunA in which they titled Super Ranger (1988).

Ryan Lambie, writing for Den of Geek, considers Rolling Thunder to be "the precursor to the modern cover shooter" due to how the player can hide behind crates, doors and other obstacles to avoid enemy fire. Rolling Thunder established the "walk-and-shoot" template later used by the Shinobi series, which borrows a number of similar mechanics, such as jumping on crates, taking cover behind crates, and jumping up to higher levels. Lambie also considers Namco's Time Crisis series to be a spiritual successor to Rolling Thunder, citing similarities like how the player can "take cover behind crates, shoot multi-colored goons with a pistol, and gradually make your way through a villain's lair in search of a damsel in distress".
