= Warp & Warp =

1981 video game

- North American arcade flyer
- Developer: Namco
- Publishers: JP: Namco; NA: Rock-Ola
- Designers: Shinichirou Okamoto; Shigeichi Ishimura
- Programmer: Shouichi Fukatani
- Platforms: Arcade, MSX, Sord M5, PV-1000
- Release: JP: July 1981; NA: August 1981
- Genre: Multidirectional shooter
- Modes: Single-player, multiplayer
- Arcade system: Namco Warp & Warp

Warp & Warp (Note: Japanese: ワープ & ワープ, Hepburn: Wāpu to Wāpu) is a 1981 multidirectional shooter video game developed and published by Namco for arcades. It was released by Rock-Ola in North America as Warp Warp. It was released in Japan in July 1981 and North America in September 1981. The game was ported to the Sord M5 and MSX. A sequel, Warpman, was released in 1985 for the Family Computer with additional enemy types, power-ups, and improved graphics and sound.

Hamster Corporation released the game as part of their Arcade Archives series for the Nintendo Switch and PlayStation 4 in November 2023.

== Gameplay ==
A Space World level in progress, with four Berobero and a bonus alien in play.

The player controls a "Monster Fighter", who must destroy tongue-sticking aliens named "Berobero" (a Japanese onomatopoeic word for licking) on two different screens, the free-movement Space World and the obstacle-filled Maze World. Controls consist of a four-position joystick and a button.

Berobero appear at the corners of the screen and begin to move around randomly, changing color and increasing in value as they approach the center. In Space World, the player can shoot and destroy them by pressing the button, while avoiding the bullets that the Berobero fire back. Destroying three consecutive Berobero of the same color causes a bonus alien to appear, which can be shot for extra points. In Maze World, the player must press the button to set time-delay bombs and catch the Berobero in their explosions; the length of the delay is set by holding the button down. The Berobero do not fire at the player on this screen, and no bonus aliens will appear; however, the player can score extra points by destroying multiple Berobero with one bomb.

Two horizontal bars at the center of the screen constitute the Warp Zone, which flashes on occasion to indicate that it is active (with the Katakana text ワープ (Wāpu) in the Japanese version or the English text "WARP" in the US versions). On either screen, stepping into the Warp Zone while it is active will immediately transport the player to the other one. Once all Berobero in a level have been destroyed, as indicated by counters in the corners of the screen, a new one begins in Space World.

One life is lost whenever the player touches a monster or alien, is hit by a bullet, or gets caught in a bomb explosion. The game ends when all lives are lost.

== Reception ==
Reception

Review scores
Publication	Score
AllGame	4/5
Tilt	3/20 (MSX)
MSX Club Magazine	8.5/10

In a retrospective review, AllGame compared its gameplay to Wizard of Wor and Bomberman, describing it as "an obscure but endearing maze shooter".
