= Galaga Remix =

2009 video game

- Developer: Namco Bandai
- Publisher: Namco Bandai
- Series: Galaxian
- Platform: Apple iOS
- Release: 2009
- Genre: Shooter
- Mode: Single-player

Galaga Remix is an iOS game based on Galaga, released in 2009 by Namco Bandai games. It is a compilation title featuring the 1981 arcade shooter Galaga and the Galaga Arrangement version from Namco Museum Battle Collection, though the game is titled Galaga Remix. The gameplay remains faithful to the original versions, with controls adapted for touch screens. However, the compilation lacks the 2-player modes present in the original games.

As of March 30, 2015, the app was delisted from the App Store and is no longer available for download. Galaga Remix is also incompatible with devices running iOS 11 or later, as the system no longer supports for 32-bit applications.

== Reception ==
Reception

Aggregate score
| Aggregator | Score |
|---|---|
| GameRankings | 72% |

Gaming website IGN gave the game a 7.5 praising it for having the same old addictive game while adding a brand new one on top of that.
