= Sky Kid =

1985 video game

- Arcade flyer
- Developer: Namco
- Publishers: JP: Namco; NA: Kitkorp; NA: Sun Corporation (NES)
- Composer: Junko Ozawa
- Platforms: Arcade, Nintendo Entertainment System
- Release: Arcade: JP: December 1985; NA: July 1986; NES: JP: August 22, 1986; NA: September 1987; VS. System: NA: 1987
- Genre: Scrolling shooter
- Modes: Single-player, multiplayer
- Arcade system: Namco Pac-Land, Nintendo VS. System

Sky Kid (Note: Japanese: スカイキッド, Hepburn: Sukai Kiddo) is a 1985 horizontally scrolling shooter video game developed and published by Namco for arcades. It was released in Japan in December 1985 and in North America by Kitkorp in July 1986. A port to the Nintendo Entertainment System was released in Japan in August 22, 1986 and in North America in September 1987 by Sun Corporation, which acquired and absorbed Kitkorp; it was also ported to arcades for the Nintendo VS. System as VS. Super Sky Kid in 1987. A sequel named Sky Kid Deluxe was released in 1986. At least one version was also imported into the UK at this time.

== Gameplay ==
Sky Kid is a two-dimensional scrolling shooter game. The players take control of the Sky Kids, "Red Baron" and "Blue Max", which are references to Manfred von Richthofen, the famous World War I flying ace, and the prestigious order Pour le Mérite informally known as Blue Max. The Sky Kids fly around in biplanes and are assigned specific targets during the missions. These missions involve bombing specific targets. The "A" button is used to control the plane's machine gun and the "B" button is used to perform a loop. A number of obstacles face the players in each level. First, their biplane is not equipped with a bomb to complete their mission and must be picked up en route to the target. Second, there are both ground and air units that attempt to keep the Sky Kids from accomplishing their mission. Last, the Sky Kids may have to navigate through some very inhospitable terrain or navigate around cities in order to get to the target. The targets which the Sky Kids must bomb will either be fortress complexes, or ships. As the players advance further up in the 21 missions, multiple targets will begin to appear in the course of one mission. Players receive points for destroying air and ground targets, and receive additional points at the end of the mission for how many of these types of targets are destroyed. In addition, players get points based on how much of the target is destroyed - but only total destruction warrants an end-of-mission bonus.

Occasionally, performing a loop over a billboard will reveal one of four hidden Namco characters: Pac-Man, Inky, the Special Flag from Rally-X (which, like the Galaxian flagship, has appeared in several other Namco games) or Pooka from Dig Dug.

If the player performs a loop in front of the three dancing girls which appear at the end of each mission, the girls will send out hearts representing kisses. If the player should shoot the girls, or hearts, they will turn into pink powder puffs and waving dogs respectively.

== Reception ==
Reception

Review scores
| Publication | Score |
|---|---|
| AllGame | 3.5/5 (AC) |
| IGN | 4/10 (Wii) |
| Nintendo Life | 3/10 (Wii) |

In Japan, Game Machine listed Sky Kid on their January 15, 1986 issue as being the second most-successful table arcade unit of the month.

== Legacy ==
The NES version was released on the Virtual Console service for the Wii, Nintendo 3DS, and Wii U, while the arcade version was released for the Wii's Virtual Console. Hamster Corporation released the game as part of their Arcade Archives series for the Nintendo Switch and PlayStation 4 in October 2021.

Sky Kid was briefly resurrected as a webcomic strip, part of Bandai Namco's ShiftyLook line featuring artwork done by Udon Entertainment. The strip focuses on the exploits of the game's two protagonists, Red Baron and Blue Max. Blue Max, known as "Sky Kid", also appears as a recurring character in the ShiftyLook animated series Mappy: The Beat. Sky Kid is a good-natured, but unhelpful and stupid employee of Nyamco who speaks with a Southern accent, and often unintentionally gets on Mappy and Dig Dug's nerves.

A theme based on Sky Kid is featured in Pac-Man 99, as special DLC. The Ace Combat series has multiple references to Sky Kid due to thematic similarities.

== Sequel ==
A sequel, Sky Kid Deluxe (Note: Japanese: スカイキッドデラックス, Hepburn: Sukai Kiddo Derakkusu), was released in 1986. Several new enemies and mission targets have been introduced (one of whom, known as the "Kaminari Kid", cannot be killed by any means). It was the first game to run on Namco's then-new Namco System 86 hardware. The game was re-released in the Japan-only Namco Collection for Microsoft Windows and received its first ever worldwide port to a console as part of Namco Museum Virtual Arcade for the Xbox 360, but did not include the second player's character Blue Max. Hamster Corporation released the game as part of their Arcade Archives series for the Nintendo Switch and PlayStation 4 in March 2023.
