= Pole Position =

1982 video game

- European arcade flyer
- Developer: Namco
- Publishers: JP/EU: Namco; NA/FRA: Atari, Inc.
- Designers: Kazunori Sawano; Sho Osugi; Shinichiro Okamoto
- Programmer: Koichi Tashiro
- Composers: Nobuyuki Ohnogi; Yuriko Keino
- Series: Pole Position
- Platform: Arcade: Atari 2600, Atari 5200, Atari 8-bit, Vectrex, VIC-20, ZX Spectrum, Commodore 64, TI-99/4A, BBC Micro, Intellivision, MS-DOS, mobile phone
- Release: September 16, 1982: Arcade; JP: September 16, 1982; NA: November 30, 1982; EU: Late 1982 2600; August 1983 5200; September 1983 Atari 8-bit; October 1983 Vectrex; November 1983 VIC-20; EU: 1983; NA: Early 1984 ZX Spectrum; UK: April 1984 C64; NA: May 1984; UK: March 1985 BBC Micro; UK: November 1984 Intellivision; March 1988 MS-DOS; 1988
- Genre: Racing
- Mode: Single-player

Pole Position (Note: Japanese: ポールポジション, Hepburn: Pōru Pojishon) is a 1982 racing video game developed and published by Namco for arcades. It was released by Atari, Inc. in North America. It was developed as a successor of Namco's earlier arcade racing electro-mechanical games, like F-1 (1976), whose designer Sho Osugi worked on Pole Position.

The game was a major commercial success in arcades. After becoming the highest-grossing arcade game of 1982 in Japan, it went on to become the most popular coin-operated arcade video game internationally in 1983. In North America, it was the highest-grossing arcade game for both 1983 and 1984 and still one of the top five in 1985.

Pole Position spawned ports, sequels, and a Saturday morning cartoon, although the cartoon has little in common with the game. The game established the conventions of the racing genre and its success inspired many imitators. Pole Position is regarded as one of the most influential video games of all time, and is considered to be the most influential racing game, as well as one of the most important titles from the golden age of arcade video games. A sequel, Pole Position II, was released in 1983 with four tracks instead of one.

== Gameplay ==
The player's car approaching a curve

The player assumes the role of a Formula One race car driver who is attempting to compete in a race at the Fuji Speedway, with the track as laid out at the time of the game's release. The first objective is to complete a one-lap time trial within a specified time limit in order to qualify for the race. A successful qualification awards bonus points and sets the player's starting position among seven computer-controlled cars, based on the lap time. The actual race consists of a set number of laps, with a set amount of time given at the start and more granted after each lap.

During both the time trial and the race, the player can briefly lose control of the car by running through puddles on the track, colliding with other cars, or driving around curves too quickly. Running off the track and into the grass will slow the car down. Billboards placed next to the track will destroy the car if it collides with one of them, resulting in a brief delay as a new car is put into play.

The game ends when the player either runs out of time during the qualifying lap or the race, or completes the final lap. The player earns bonus points for every car passed, and an additional bonus for any time left on the clock.

Pole Position was the first racing video game to feature a track based on a real racing circuit. It was also the first game to feature a qualifying lap, requiring the player to finish a time trial before they can compete in Grand Prix races. Once the player has qualified, they must complete the race in the time allowed, avoiding collisions with CPU-controlled opponents and billboards along the sides of the track. The game's North American distributor, Atari, publicized the game for its "unbelievable driving realism" in providing a Formula 1 experience behind a racing wheel. The game's graphics featured full-colour landscapes with scaling sprites, including race cars and other signs, and a pseudo-3D, third-person, rear perspective view of the track, with its vanishing point swaying side to side as the player approaches corners, accurately simulating forward movement into the distance. While earlier three-dimensional arcade driving games emphasized staying on the road while avoiding crashes, Pole Position gives a higher reward for passing rival cars and finishing among the leaders.

== Development ==
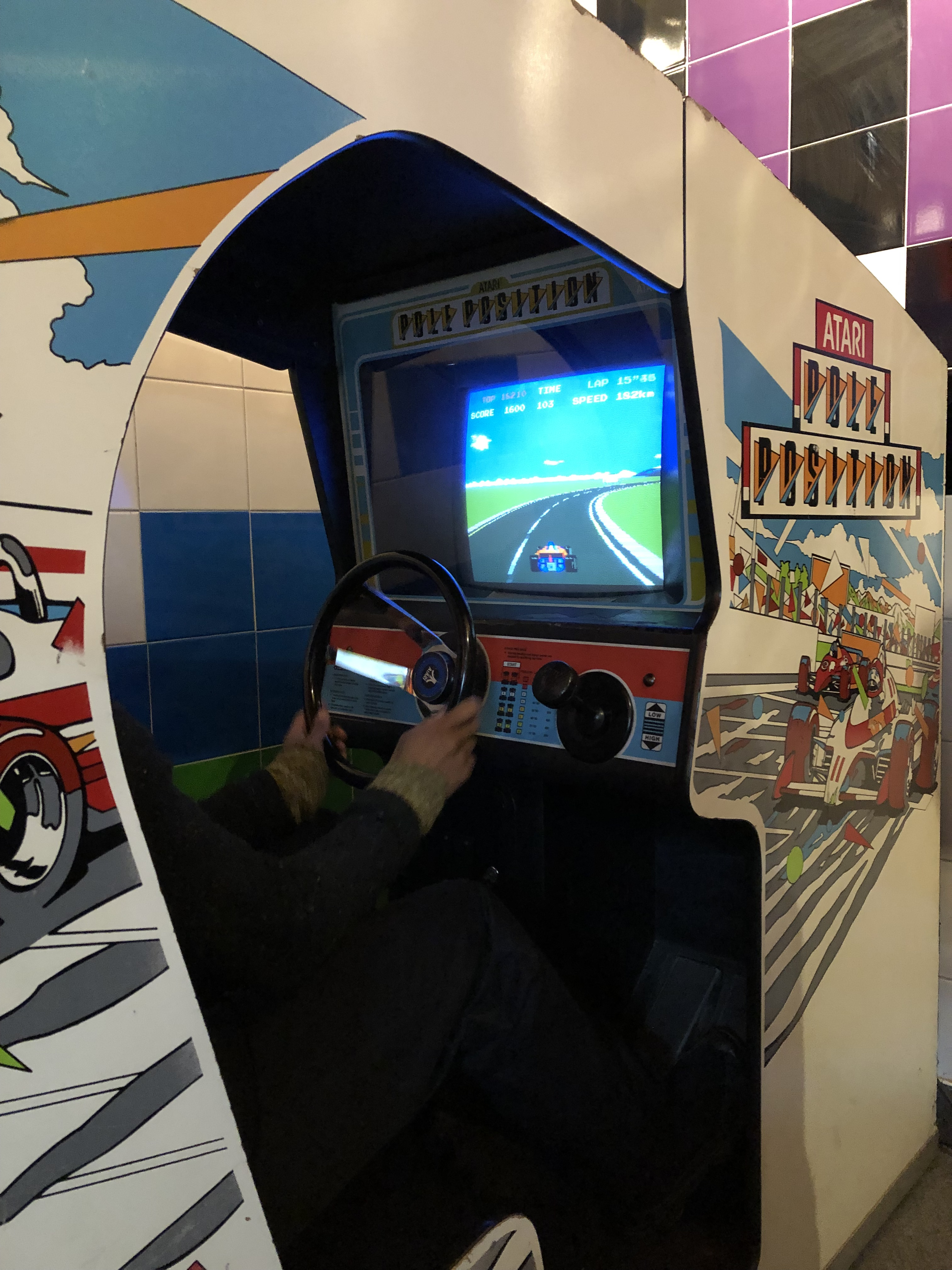
A Pole Position arcade cabinet

Pole Position was created by both Shinichiro Okamoto and Galaxian designer Kazunori Sawano. Namco electro-mechanical game engineer Sho Osugi also assisted with development. Based on Namco's experience with producing coin-operated electro-mechanical driving games in the 1970s, notably F-1 (1976) designed by Sho Osugi, Sawano showed Okamoto rough sketches of his idea, who liked it enough to begin production of a video racing game. Okamoto wanted the game to be a true driving simulation game that used a 3D perspective and allowed the player to execute real-world techniques. He also chose to add the Fuji Speedway into the game to make newer players recognize it when they first played. Music was jointly composed by Nobuyuki Ohnogi and Yuriko Keino.

Development of the game lasted for three years. Okamoto recalls the most challenging part of development being to produce the hardware needed to run it, as the game was too "ambitious" to run on older hardware. The development team used two 16-bit processors to power the game, which Okamoto says was an unheard-of concept for arcade games at the time—for a while, it was the only video game to use a Zilog Z8000 CPU. Pac-Man creator Toru Iwatani chose the name Pole Position as he thought it sounded "cool" and appealing, and he shortly after filed a trademark for it. The controls also proved to be a challenge, as Okamoto wanted them to feel realistic and to match up with the gameplay — Osugi remembers Namco president Masaya Nakamura becoming frustrated with them, having difficulty keeping the car moving in a straight line. The game is an early example of product placement in a video game, with billboards around the track advertising actual companies such as Pepsi, Marlboro, and Canon. The development team had long fights over how fast the gear-shift should be, until it was ultimately decided to simply be either high or low speed.

== Release ==
Pole Position was officially released in Japan on September 16, 1982. It was licensed to Atari, Inc. for release in North America, where it made its debut at Chicago's 1982 Amusement & Music Operators Association (AMOA) show, held during November 18–20, before receiving a mass-market North American release on November 30, 1982, while Namco themselves released the game in Europe in late 1982. After its release, Osugi stated that all of Namco's older electro-mechanical driving games were discontinued, as the company saw the future of arcade racers in the form of video games.

Pole Position was released in two configurations: a standard upright cabinet and an environmental/cockpit cabinet. Both versions include a steering wheel and a gear shifter for low and high gears, but the environmental/cockpit cabinet featured both an accelerator and a brake pedal, while the standard upright one only featured an accelerator pedal. The environmental/cockpit cabinet was chosen due to the popularity of such machines at the time.

In 1983, Atari commissioned a TV commercial for the Atari 2600 and 5200 versions of the game that was shown exclusively on MTV; it was one of a series of spots for the company's games that were specifically created for the network around the same time.

== Reception ==
=== Sales ===
In Japan, Game Machine magazine listed Pole Position as the highest-grossing arcade game of 1982, and later listed it as the second top-grossing upright arcade unit of May 1983, before it returned to being the top-grossing game of October 1983. Internationally, Pole Position was the most popular game of 1983. In Europe, it was a top-grossing arcade game in 1983.

In the United States, it sold over 21,000 arcade cabinets for an estimated $61 million ($204 million adjusted for inflation) by 1983. In addition, US coin drop earnings averaged $9.5 million ($32 million adjusted for inflation) per week ($450 weekly per machine). On the US RePlay arcade charts, it topped the upright cabinet charts for seven months in 1983, from March through August and again in December. It also topped the US Play Meter arcade charts for six consecutive months from March through August 1983, and then topped the street locations chart in November 1983. It ended the year as the highest-grossing arcade game of 1983 in North America, according to RePlay and the Amusement & Music Operators Association (AMOA), and again became the highest-grossing arcade game of 1984 in the United States. Several years after its release, it was still one of the top five highest-grossing arcade video games of 1985.

The console version topped the UK sales charts in late 1983. In the United States between 1986 and 1990, the Atari 2600 version sold 578,281 units for $3,642,246, the Atari 5200 version sold 12,492 units for $62,601, and the version for Atari 8-bit computers version sold 9,204 units for $106,014, adding up to 599,977 units sold and $3,810,861 (equivalent to $11,200,000 in 2025) grossed between 1986 and 1990.

=== Critical reception ===
Reception

Review scores
Publication	Score
AllGame	3/5 (Arcade)
Computer and Video Games	Positive (Arcade); 34/40 (Atari VCS); 85% (Atari VCS)
Eurogamer	6/10 (retrospective)
Your Sinclair	4/5 (Spectrum)
Computer Gamer	4.5/5 (Spectrum)
Computer Games	Classic (home computers)
Electronic Games	Positive (Arcade)
Telematch	6/6 (2600); 5/6 (Vectrex)
Video Games	Positive (Arcade)

Awards
Publication	Award
Arcade Awards (1983)	Coin-Op Game of the Year
Arkie Awards (1984)	Computer Game of the Year (Certificate of Merit)
Softline (1984)	Most Popular Program: Atari (Fourth Place)

Upon its North American debut at AMOA, Pole Position was reviewed by Video Games magazine, which listed it among the show's top ten games. They compared it favorably with Sega's Turbo (1981), referring to Pole Position as "Turbo Deluxe" in "a speedway, not a cross-country race". They called Pole Position the "ultimate test of driving skill" for racing players. Electronic Games reviewed the arcade game in 1983, writing that it "keeps the action on track from start to finish" with "challenging play", noting the gameplay is "reasonably faithful to real life" Formula One races. They also praised the sound effects and "solid, realistic graphics", stating it has "very rich color images" and "dimensional depth to the graphics". They gave it the 1983 Arcade Award for Coin-Op Game of the Year, praising the racing gameplay, "beautiful graphics" and "breathtaking" scenery as well as "the two-heat format for the race itself".

Computer and Video Games reviewed the arcade game in 1983, writing that it "is simply the most exhilarating driving simulation game on the market". They compared it favorably with Turbo, stating that, while Turbo "featured better landscapes," it "can't match the speed, thrills and skill behind this new race game". They said Pole Position's graphics "are sophisticated and believable", noting how cars "turning corners are shown in every graphic detail of the maneuvre". They also praised the gameplay, concluding that "trying to hold a screaming curve or overtake" offers "thrills to compare with the real racetrack". It was considered the all-time best racing/driving game by InfoWorld in 1983 and Computer Games in early 1985.

Reviewing the Atari 8-bit version, InfoWorld called it "by far the best road-race game ever thrown on a video screen" with "bright and brilliant" graphics, and reiterated the recommendation in InfoWorld's Essential Guide to Atari Computers, but said the Commodore 64 version "looks like a rush job and is far from arcade-game quality". Computer Games magazine criticized the Commodore conversions for lacking various features from the arcade original, giving the C64 version a mixed review and the VIC-20 version a negative review. Computer and Video Games reviewed the Atari 2600 version, stating it is "the best driving game available" on the Atari VCS. When reviewing the Atari 5200 version, Hi-Res in 1984 found "the playability of the game to be limited and the graphics to be the strongest aspect of the game". The magazine preferred Adventure International's Rally Speedway to both Pole Position and Epyx's Pitstop.

In 2007, Eurogamer gave it a mixed retrospective review, calling it "a simulation down to the core" and that those dedicated racing fans will be deterred by the game's difficulty. Entertainment Weekly called Pole Position one of the top ten games for the Atari 2600 in 2013.

== Legacy ==
Pole Position is regarded as one of the most influential video games of all time, and was the most successful racing game of the golden age of arcade video games. Bill Loguce and Matt Barton listed it as one of the 25 most influential games of all time, calling it "arguably the most important racing game ever made". In 1984, Electronic Games stated that, for "the first time in the amusement parlors, a first-person racing game gives a higher reward for passing cars and finishing among the leaders rather than just for keeping all four wheels on the road, thus making driving an art". In 1995, Flux magazine ranked the game 32nd on their "Top 100 Video Games". In 2015, Pole Position topped IGN's list of The Top 10 Most Influential Racing Games Ever. They stated it had "a drastically better-looking" third-person "chase cam view" than Turbo, was "the first racing game based on a real-world racing circuit (Fuji Speedway in Japan)", "introduced checkpoints, and was the first to require a qualifying lap", and that its success, as "the highest-grossing arcade game in North America in 1983, cemented the genre in place for decades to come and inspired a horde of other racing games".

Pole Position spawned ports, sequels, and a Saturday morning cartoon. The game spawned a number of clones, such as Top Racer from Commodore International, which led to a lawsuit from Namco against Commodore Japan that led to the seizure of Top Racer copies. Parker Brothers also published a board game based on Pole Position in 1983. The game was re-released as part of Microsoft Return of Arcade, the Namco Museum series of games, as well as by Hamster Corporation as part of their Arcade Archives series for the Nintendo Switch and PlayStation 4 in July 2023.
