= Mappy =

1983 video game

- North American arcade flyer
- Developer: Namco
- Publishers: JP: Namco; NA: Bally Midway; EU: Orion
- Artist: Hiroshi Ono
- Composer: Nobuyuki Ohnogi
- Series: Mappy
- Platform: Arcade: Sharp X1, MZ-700/MZ-1500, Famicom, MSX, FM-7, PC-88, PC-8000, PC-6001, Super Cassette Vision, X68000, Game Gear, Windows, Game Boy Advance, mobile phone
- Release: March 1983: Arcade; JP: March 1983; NA: April 1983; EU: 1983 Famicom; JP: November 14, 1984 MSX; JP/EU: 1984 Game Gear; JP: May 24, 1991 Windows; JP: April 16, 1999 Game Boy Advance; JP: February 14, 2004
- Genre: Platform
- Modes: Single-player, multiplayer

Mappy (Note: Japanese: マッピー, Hepburn: Mappī) is a 1983 platform video game developed and published by Namco for arcades. It was released in Japan in March 1983 and in North America by Bally Midway in April 1983. It runs on Namco's Mappy hardware (which is a modified/revised version of the Super Pac-Man hardware to support horizontal scrolling). The name "Mappy" is likely derived from mappo (マッポ), a slightly pejorative Japanese slang term for policeman. The game has been re-released in several Namco arcade compilations. It spawned a handful of sequels and a 2013 animated web series developed by cartoonists Scott Kurtz and Kris Straub.

== Gameplay ==
Mappy launches a push wave at a pair of Meowkies (arcade version).

Controls consist of a two-position joystick and a button. The player assumes the role of Mappy, a police mouse tasked with recovering stolen items from a mansion that serves as a hideout for a gang of thieving cats. Goro (Nyamco in Japanese), large and red, is the leader, while the smaller pink Meowky cats (Mewky in Japanese) are his underlings.

The mansion contains horizontal passages closed off by doors and broken up with gaps bridged by trampolines. If a character runs off the edge of a platform, he will fall into a gap and bounce on a trampoline if one is there. Both Mappy and the cats can veer to either side and land on a platform while traveling upward, but not while falling. A trampoline will break if Mappy bounces on it four consecutive times, changing color after each bounce to indicate its status. Once Mappy lands on a platform, the trampoline reverts to its original status. He cannot be hurt by any cats while bouncing either up or down, and the cats can bounce on trampolines without breaking them.

The goal of each round is to collect all 10 stolen items, which form five pairs: stereos, televisions, Mona Lisa paintings, computers, and safes.

Bonus points can be scored in two ways:

- Collecting an item behind which Goro is hiding, which briefly stuns him.
- Collecting both items in a pair consecutively, which multiplies the value of the second one. The multiplier starts at two on each new round or life, and increases by one for each additional pair of consecutive items, to a maximum of six.

Doors can be opened or closed by both Mappy and the cats, and always open toward their knobs. To open or close a door, the player must face it and press the button. Any character standing near a door will be briefly knocked back and stunned if it opens toward him. Flashing doors release a burst of microwaves when opened, which travels horizontally in the opening direction and will sweep away any cats caught in it for extra points, which are doubled if Goro is among them. After a short delay, these cats return to play from the top edge of the screen. Only Mappy can open a microwave door, after which it reverts to an ordinary one that any character can open or close.

The round ends once all 10 items have been collected. If the player takes too long, a hurry-up warning sounds, more Meowky cats enter the mansion, and all enemies speed up. After enough time passes, a large "Gosenzo" coin with Goro's face enters the screen; it is immune to microwaves and can kill Mappy even in midair.

At intervals, a bonus round is played in which the goal is to score extra points by popping as many balloons as possible in a short time, while bouncing on trampolines and veering left/right through a set of vertical passages. The round ends when Mappy pops all the balloons, runs out of time, or falls through a broken trampoline to the bottom of the screen.

As the game progresses, difficulty features are added that include:

- More Meowky cats, moving at a faster speed.
- The ability to enter the mansion's attic and move within it.
- Bells hung above trampolines, which Mappy can knock loose while bouncing and drop on cats to stun them.
- Flashing sections of floor that briefly vanish after Mappy steps on them. Any cat that falls through the resulting hole will be stunned, awarding bonus points.

One life is lost whenever Mappy touches an un-stunned cat while moving, falls to the bottom of the screen without hitting a trampoline (except in a bonus round), or touches a Gosenzo at any time. When all lives are lost, the game ends.

== Ports and sequels ==
Mappy was featured as one of the games in Namco Gallery Vol. 1, a collection of classic Namco arcade games released for the Game Boy. The Famicom version was re-released in 2004 for Game Boy Advance as part of the Famicom Mini line of re-releases. The arcade version was released on the Wii's Virtual Console in 2009. The arcade version was also released by Hamster Corporation as part of their Arcade Archives series for the Nintendo Switch and PlayStation 4 in October 2021.

Mappy was followed up by numerous sequels, including Hopping Mappy , a direct sequel released to arcades in 1986, and Mappy-Land , a sequel to the Famicom version which was released internationally. In 2003, two mobile games were released in Japan with the titles Teku-Teku Mappy (テクテクマッピー) and Mappy De Puzzle (マッピーDEパズル). In September 2011, the mobile game Mappy World (マッピーワールド) was released.

== Reception ==
Reception

Review scores
Publication	Score
AllGame	3.5/5
Eurogamer	7/10
IGN	6.5/10
Nintendo Life	7/10

In Japan, Game Machine listed Mappy as the third most successful table arcade unit of May 1983. It also topped the Game Machine chart for new table arcade cabinets in June 1983. In 2015, Hardcore Gamer included Mappy on its list of the "200 Best Video Games of All Time".

== Legacy ==
As part of Bandai Namco's ShiftyLook initiative, an animated Mappy web series, titled Mappy: The Beat, was made. The series was written and directed by Scott Kurtz and Kris Straub, who also performed all of the character voices, and was designed with limited animation in the style of Kurtz and Straub's Blamimations series. The story follows Mappy, now working a thankless job as a security guard for his former foe Goro's company Nyamco. He is accompanied by his friends and fellow Nyamco employees, the laid-back digging-obsessed Dig Dug and the dim but good-natured Sky Kid, along with other Bandai Namco characters working at the office.

Mappy is a playable character in the PlayStation Portable racing game Pac-Man World Rally.

An animated webseries of shorts based on the game, titled Mappy Chu!, was announced in February 20, 2026. The series was produced by Bandai Namco Entertainment in association with IP content production company Plott, with character designs by Jessica Yukie Kogure from Bandai Namco Studios. It premiered on video-focused social media platforms such as TikTok and YouTube on February 22, 2026.
