= Maze game =

Video game genre

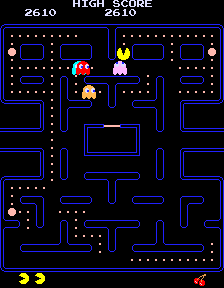
An in-game screenshot of Pac-Man.

Maze game is a video game genre in which players navigate a maze. Some of these games, also known as maze chase games, involve navigating a maze while under pursuit from other characters moving through the same maze. While the term first appeared in 1980, some of the earliest video games involved navigating a maze, such as Mouse in the Maze created in the 1950s. While some writers such as Mark J. Wolf described games like Pac-Man (1980) as combining maze games with "collecting" and "escaping" gameplay styles, Allison Gizzard suggested Wolf's definition made the maze its own non-entity as a genre and more of an element of other gameplay styles.

In the 1970s, early commercial maze games such as Gotcha (1973) by Atari Inc. were released to arcades and home consoles. Towards the late 1970s, maze games began to have broader goals. Games such as Slot Racers (1978), Head On (1979) and Heiankyo Alien (1979) included gameplay beyond basic maze navigation such as collecting items and avoiding other maze dwellers.

Namco's Pac-Man (1980) was described by Steven Malliet and Gust De Meyere in Handbook of Computer Game Studies (2005) as "the perfection" of the maze game genre. In the early 1980s, various sequels to Pac-Man, games that expanded upon its gameplay, and various video game clones of the original game were released. While some Pac-Man games delved into other genres such as the platformer Pac-Land (1984), mazes games began to appear less frequently as elements such as 3D environments and side-scrolling became more prominent in video games. Some later releases would still retain the core gameplay of the genre, such as the various Pac-Man sequels including Pac-Mania (1987) and Pac-Man Championship Edition (2007).

== Etymology and characteristics ==
In 1980, due to the economic pressure of the gaming industry, video games began being categorized by genres that shared narrative structure, gameplay mechanics, and other schematics. One of the first video game genre classifications was by Chris Crawford who described "skill-and-action games", which included racing games and maze games. The maze game became a common generic label in the early 1980s. It was associated with arcade games such as Namco's Pac-Man (1980), but also with textual and graphic adventure games where players had where players had to find their way in labyrinthine spaces. Electronic Games classified maze games into three types: maze chases such as Pac-Man, maze shoot-outs such as Berzerk (1980), and maze explorations such as Tutankham (1982). Other publications such as Computer Gaming World also used the term "maze chase" for Pac-Man like games.

Mark J. P. Wolf described the maze game genre in his book The Medium of the Video Game (2001). He defined it as a game where the objective requires a player to successfully navigate a maze. He added that the player-character in these games often, but not always, have to navigate a maze under the pressure of pursuers.

Wolf's examples of what could qualify as a maze game included Pac-Man (1980), Mouse Trap (1981), and K.C. Munchkin! (1981) which were also combined with "collecting" and "escaping" gameplay". Mike Bevan of Retro Gamer magazine described the types of maze games that had pursuers as "maze chase" games. Bevan would also describe other styles such as "maze shooter" or "corridor shooters" where the player was usually in a top-down-perspective of a maze environment equipped with a weapon to defend themself.

Alison Gazzard critiqued Wolf's definition, describing it as too broad, specifically when he said it could be combined with other genres such as shoot 'em up and adventure games. She continued that Wolf's definition would make the maze be an element of many game types instead of its own entity.

== History ==
=== Early mazes in video games ===
The idea of creating a maze as an environment for a video game began at the Massachusetts Institute of Technology (MIT) in the late 1950s. In 1956, Claude Shannon joined MIT's Research Laboratory of Electronic and created Theseus, a mechanical roving mouse who shared the name of Theseus the mythical slayer of the minotaur in his labyrinth. Shannon's creation influenced two grad students, Douglas T. Ross and John Ward to write Mouse in the Maze, a program for MIT's TX-0 computer. It was a digitized version of Shannon's Theseus, which allowed users to draw a maze on the system's Cathode ray tube (CRT) screen with a light pen. It featured a small "blip" representing a mouse to navigate to other dots on the screen which represented a wedge of cheese.

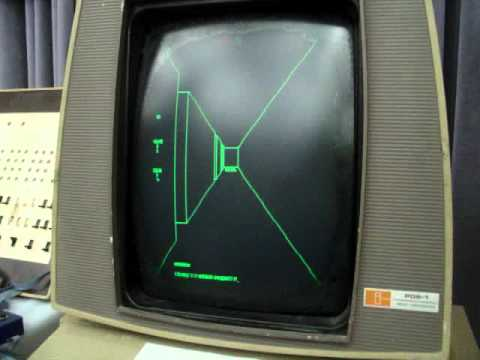
MIT version of Maze on an Imlac PDS-1D at the Computer History Museum.

Prior to 1978, maze games were generally about navigating a character through a labyrinth or chasing another through one. Early 1970s video games in the genre include the two-player game Cat and Mouse (1972) for the Magnavox Odyssey. The game involved a transparent screen placed over a television screen displaying a maze with player represented by white dots to move along the maze and to not hit the walls which would reset their position at the start of the maze. The goal was for one player, representing the mouse, to get the safe "mouse house" while avoiding the cat controlled by the other player. Allan Alcorn of Atari would develop Gotcha (1973), the first maze arcade game. where two players would chase each other through the a maze that was displayed from a top-down perspective. The earliest example of implementing a maze in a 3D environment was made with Maze (1973) on the IMLAC PDS-1 computers at a NASA research center in California. Midway would release their own arcade game The Amazing Maze Game (1976) which had players actively escape a maze instead of just catching an opponent and allowed players to compete against a computer controlled opponent.

Towards the late 1970s maze games began to have broader goals. These include games such as Warren Robinett's Atari 2600 game Slot Racers (1978), Sega's arcade game Head On (1979), Technical Science Group's Heiankyo Alien (1979), and Namco's Pac-Man (1980). Head On would introduce the idea of collecting dots to proceed to a new level. Bevan said that Head On was an important title as it would feature gameplay of collecting dots, navigating a maze and featured score boosting items which would all become present in the Pac-Man video game series. In Japan, the style created by Head On is considered the progenitor of what they refer to as the dot-eating (Note: ドットイートゲーム, Dottoītogēmu) game.

Bill Logudice and Matt Barton, the authors of Vintage Games (2009) said that these earlier games were not played much by contemporary gamers as they were eclipsed by Pac-Man and the games influenced by it "in terms of playability, personality, and popularity." In 1983, the editors of Electronic Fun with Computers & Games magazine said that Pac-Man changed the face of maze games altogether by introducing an affable character and a bunch of active predators" and that following its release "mazes were everywhere."

=== 1980s ===
Pac-Man (1980), was developed in Japan and was described by Steven Malliet and Gust De Meyere in Handbook of Computer Game Studies (2005) as "the perfection" of the maze game genre. Video games with similar mechanics were released. These included Wizard of Wor (1981) which shared the similar warping passages from Pac-Man. Other games would feature new elements such as the gated-walls in Lady Bug (1981). The gameplay of having to defeat all the enemies on the screen that originated in Heiankyo Alien would appear in later maze games such as Tranquilizer Gun (1980), Pengo (1982), and Bomberman (1983).

Other games introduced new elements to the gameplay such as side-scrolling in early 1980s titles like Namco's Rally-X (1980) and Konami's Tutankham (1982). A few commercial maze games set in 3D spaces were released in the early 1980s such as 3D Monster Maze (1981), Escape From the Mindmaster (1982), and Tunnel Runner (1983).

In the 1970s and early 1980s, video game clones of popular arcade games were rampant, and this growth of clones was followed on home computers. These clones often copied gameplay and had similar names to their original influences. Pac-Man had several clones in the early 1980s with titles like Munch Man (1982), Snapper (1982) and Hungry Horace (1982). In a 1982 court case, Atari secured a copyright injunction against K.C. Munchkin! (1981) for being too close in "look and feel" to Pac-Man. More successful injunctions followed against Packri-Monster (1981) and Mighty Mouth (1981). Online Systems (later known as Sierra) settled out of court over Jawbreaker (1981). While K.C. Munchkin! and other games were pulled from the market, the courts defended the concept of a maze chase game as fair use.

=== Post-1980s ===
Towards the mid-1980s, the Pac-Man franchise moved away from its maze game route with trivia games like Professor Pac-Man (1983) and the platformer Pac-Land (1984). The series would return later to similar maze game-styled gameplay elements with later titles like Pac-Mania (1987), Ms. Pac-Man Maze Madness (2000) and Pac-Man Championship Edition (2007). Among the last Western-made arcade maze games was Trog (1990).

In an article about the "dot-eating games" in The Super Famicom magazine in 1991, Satoshi Tajiri and Akihito Tomisawa found that as game technology grew more advanced and gameplay moved beyond the constraint of collecting points as the main goal, only the Bomberman series had remained popular while all others had practically disappeared. Writing for the Institute of Game Culture Conservation in 2019, Tada Namisuke said that as scrolling became commonplace in video games, the format was not best applied to games that did not involve actions like collecting all the dots in a maze.

=== Legacy ===
Towards the 1990s, mazes became prominent features in other genres such as the first-person role-playing video games for personal computers such as Dungeon Master (1987) and other emerging genres such as the first-person shooters such as Wolfenstein 3D (1992).

Gameplay in maze games would be used in other genres such as early 1980s platformers. Peter McDonald, author of Run and Jump: The Meaning of the 2D Platformer (2024) wrote that games that did not feature jumping like BurgerTime (1982) resembled the Pac-Man (1980) where a player moves on a horizonal and vertical access to avoid enemies. McDonald said that as the game still features the advantage of being "higher up" than the enemies as they can sabotage them by actions related to a platform, that this small difference made it a platformer. Other games such as Big Five Software's Miner 2049er (1982) combined ladder-climbing gameplay from Donkey Kong (1981) and stage-traversal and power-ups which allowed enemies to become vulnerable from touch was derived from Pac-Man.

== See also ==
- List of Pac-Man clones
- List of maze video games
