= Namco Museum =

Series of compilation games

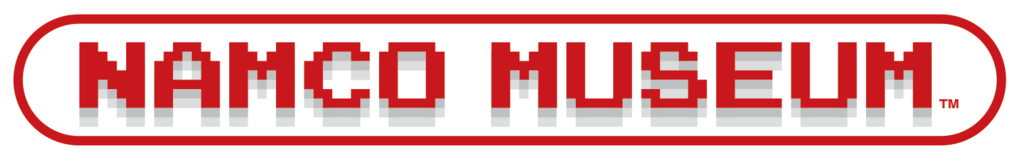
- Genre: Various
- Developers: Namco; Bandai Namco Studios; M2
- Publishers: Namco; Bandai Namco Entertainment
- Platform: List: PlayStation, Nintendo 64, Dreamcast, Game Boy Advance, PlayStation 2, Xbox, GameCube, PlayStation Portable, Windows, Nintendo DS, Wii, Xbox 360, PlayStation 3, Nintendo Switch, Dedicated console, Evercade, PlayStation 4, Xbox One
- First release: Namco Museum Vol. 1 November 22, 1995
- Latest release: Namco Museum Archives Vol. 2 June 18, 2020

Namco Museum (Note: Japanese: ナムコミュージアム. Hepburn: Namuko Myūjiamu) is a series of video game compilations developed and published by Bandai Namco Entertainment for home video game consoles. The first title in the series, Namco Museum Vol. 1, was released for the PlayStation in 1995. Entries in the series have been released for multiple platforms, including the Game Boy Advance, PlayStation 2, PlayStation Portable, Nintendo DS, and Xbox 360. The latest title so far, Namco Museum Archives Vol. 2, was released in 2020.

The Namco Museum name was originally used for a chain of retail stores in the 1980s, which sold merchandise based on Namco video games and characters. The compilations include video games developed by Namco for both arcade hardware and home game systems, including the Nintendo Entertainment System and Sega Genesis. Some iterations use software emulation for the games, while others instead reprogram them from scratch. The collections typically include interchangeable game settings, online leaderboards or unlockable extras, such as games or promotional material. The original PlayStation series, with the exception of Namco Museum Encore, instead placed the player in a virtual museum that housed the individual games.

The Namco Museum series has been met with a mixed to positive critical response, some praising the emulation quality and unlockable extras while others criticizing the overall presentation and lack of updated features to the included titles. The franchise has sold a total of more than 14 million copies worldwide.

== Games ==
=== Namco Museum Vol. 1—Encore (1995–1998) ===
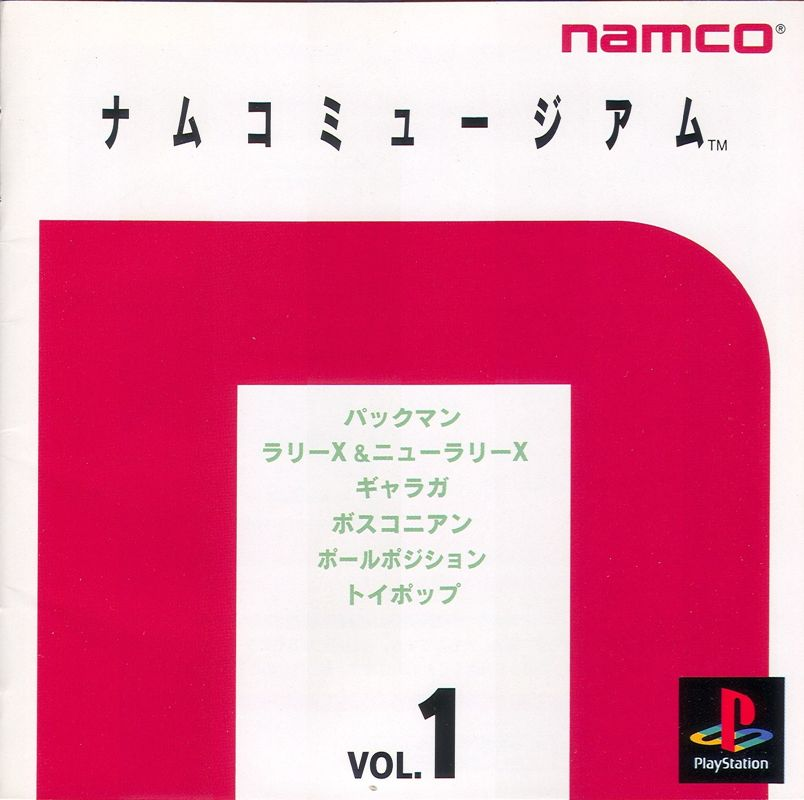
Cover of Namco Museum Vol. 1 (1995) on the PlayStation

Six Namco Museum volumes were released for the PlayStation from 1995 to 1998, including one (Namco Museum Encore) that was released only in Japan. When Namco unveiled Volume 5 at the November 1996 PlayStation Expo, it was announced that it would be the final volume in the series, hence the sixth volume's title, "Encore". The first five volumes pose a 3D virtual museum that players are able to walk around in, with each game being stored in an "exhibit" room. In these museums, players can view conceptual artwork, marketing material, arcade system boards, and other material relating to the included games. Encore replaces the museum with a standard menu system. The means by which Namco recreated the games for the PlayStation hardware is unclear; the arcade game conversions contain pieces of the original game data but none of the original source code, suggesting they are object-level recreations.

The control systems of each of the games were well-preserved. However, since the PlayStation's analog controller was not available at the time, analog control for Pole Position and Pole Position II is only supported in these compilations by Namco's neGcon joypad.

In Japan, Vol. 2 had a special edition box set that included replica promotional cards and the Namco Volume Controller. A limited edition of Namco Museum Encore was bundled with a case designed to hold the six volumes in the series plus a memory card. All six volumes were added to the Japanese PlayStation Store as PSOne Classics. Volumes 1 to 4 were released on December 11, 2013 while Vol. 5 and Encore were released on December 18, 2013. The five numbered installments were added to the North American PlayStation Store on September 30, 2014.

Volume	Release date			Games included						
Volume	Japan	North America	Europe	Games included						
Namco Museum Vol. 1	November 22, 1995	August 7, 1996	August 17, 1996	Pac-Man (1980)	Rally-X (1980)	New Rally-X (1981)	Galaga (1981)	Bosconian (1981)	Pole Position (1982)	Toy Pop (1986)
Namco Museum Vol. 2	February 9, 1996	October 25, 1996	November 22, 1996	Cutie Q (1979) (Note: In releases outside of Japan, Super Pac-Man (1982) replaces Cutie Q.)	Xevious (1983)	Mappy (1983)	Gaplus (1984)	Grobda (1984)	Dragon Buster (1985)	Bomb Bee† (1979)
Namco Museum Vol. 3	June 21, 1996	February 20, 1997	February 12, 1997	Galaxian (1979)	Ms. Pac-Man (1982)	Dig Dug (1982)	Phozon (1983)	Pole Position II (1983)	The Tower of Druaga (1984)	—N/a
Namco Museum Vol. 4	November 8, 1996	July 17, 1997	August 18, 1997	Pac-Land (1984)	The Return of Ishtar (1986)	Genpei Tōma Den (1986)	Ordyne (1988)	Assault (1988)	Assault Plus† (1988)	—N/a
Namco Museum Vol. 5	February 28, 1997	November 26, 1997	February 26, 1998	Metro-Cross (1985)	Baraduke (1985)	Dragon Spirit (1987)	Pac-Mania (1987)	Valkyrie no Densetsu (1989)	—N/a	—N/a
Namco Museum Encore	October 30, 1997	—N/a	—N/a	King & Balloon (1980)	Motos (1985)	Sky Kid (1985)	Rolling Thunder (1986)	Wonder Momo (1987)	Rompers (1989)	Dragon Saber (1990)
† indicates a hidden game. In addition, Bomb Bee is unavailable outside of Japan.

=== Namco Museum 64 and Namco Museum (1999–2002) ===
Namco Museum 64 Namco Museum
- Nintendo 64 cover art
- Developer: Mass Media
- Publisher: Namco
- Series: Namco Museum
- Platforms: Nintendo 64, Dreamcast, Game Boy Advance, PlayStation 2, GameCube, Xbox
- Release: November 29, 1999: Nintendo 64; NA: November 29, 1999 Dreamcast; NA: June 25, 2000 Game Boy Advance; NA: June 11, 2001; JP: December 7, 2001; EU: December 7, 2001 PlayStation 2; NA: December 4, 2001 GameCube, Xbox; NA: October 9, 2002
- Genre: Various
- Mode: Single-player

Namco Museum 64 for Nintendo 64 and Namco Museum for Dreamcast and Game Boy Advance are the first compilations in the series to omit a virtual museum. The GBA version was released worldwide and was a launch title for the system in North America, while other versions were exclusive to North America. The following games, originally featured in Namco Museum Vol. 1 and Namco Museum Vol. 3 for the PlayStation, are included:

- Pac-Man (1980, not in the GBA version)
- Ms. Pac-Man (1982)
- Galaga (1981)
- Galaxian (1979)
- Pole Position (1982)
- Dig Dug (1982)

The GBA version does not retain high scores when powered off, which is also the case with its counterpart game, Pac-Man Collection. On the Wii U Virtual Console, however, the Restore Point feature saves scores for both games. The N64 version requires a Controller Pak with eight free pages and one free slot to save high scores and settings. The Dreamcast version requires a VMU with eight free blocks for saving progress, while also offering a mini-game that's exclusive to the VMU titled Pac-It, with gameplay similar to Kaboom!.

In the United States, Namco Museum for the Game Boy Advance sold 2.4 million copies and earned $37 million by August 2006. During the period between January 2000 and August 2006, it was the third-highest-selling game for handheld game consoles in that country.

It was also the first time an entry had been released on PlayStation 2, Xbox, and GameCube. It was first released in 2001 on PlayStation 2, followed by GameCube and Xbox in 2002.

The compilation on these consoles includes all the games from Namco Museum 64 and Namco Museum for Dreamcast plus:

- Pac-Man Arrangement (1996)
- Galaga Arrangement (1995)
- Dig Dug Arrangement (1996)
- Pac-Attack (1993) – hidden game
- Pac-Mania (1987) – hidden game
- Pole Position II (1983)

This edition of Namco Museum is the first collection in the series to include a game that originated on home consoles (Pac-Attack, originally released on the Genesis and the Super NES and also previously included in the Japanese-only Namco Anthology Vol. 2, and Pac-Man Collection). The version of Pac-Attack seen here also resembles the Genesis version, as opposed to the SNES version. This is distinguished by the music, which sounds like the Genesis version of the game.

The "Arrangement" games in the collection were originally on the arcade's Namco Classic Collection Vol. 1 and Vol. 2. The pitch of the music in Pac-Man Arrangement and Dig Dug Arrangement has been changed slightly from the original: it is higher-pitched than in the arcade versions. This compilation was released only in North America on all three of the consoles on which it was released.

=== Namco Museum Battle Collection ===
This title was released on the PlayStation Portable in 2005. It contains over twenty of Namco's games such as Pac-Man (1980) and Galaga (1981). In addition, new "Arrangement" variants are available for Pac-Man, Galaga, New Rally-X (1981) and Dig Dug (1982), which have updated gameplay, graphics and can be played in a versus or co-operative mode using the PSP's ad hoc feature. Game Sharing, a feature that had not yet been used on the PSP, was introduced in this game. This allowed others PSPs in the area to download the first few levels of some of the games.

The "Arrangement" games in this compilation are not the same as they were on the arcade's Namco Classic Collection Vol. 1 and Vol. 2. They are entirely new games that were designed to take advantage of the PSP's hardware and features.

The Japanese version is divided into two volumes, with the second containing three additional games: Dragon Spirit, Motos Arrangement and Pac-Man Arrangement Plus.

=== Namco Museum 50th Anniversary ===
Namco Museum 50th Anniversary
- Developer: Digital Eclipse
- Publishers: JP: Namco; NA: Namco Hometek; PAL: Electronic Arts
- Series: Namco Museum
- Platforms: Game Boy Advance, PlayStation 2, Xbox, GameCube, Windows
- Release: August 30, 2005: Game Boy Advance, PlayStation 2, Xbox; NA: August 30, 2005; JP: January 26, 2006; AU: January 31, 2006; EU: March 31, 2006 GameCube; NA: August 30, 2005; EU: June 9, 2006 Windows; NA: October 25, 2005; AU: March 27, 2006; EU: May 19, 2006
- Genre: Various
- Modes: Single-player, multiplayer

A special edition that marks Namco's founding as a toy manufacturing company in 1955. It was the second Namco Museum compilation to be released on the PlayStation 2, Xbox and the GameCube. The Game Boy Advance version was also the second Namco Museum compilation for the GBA. It was also released on Microsoft Windows. In Japan, this was released under the title Namco Museum Arcade Hits! for PlayStation 2 only, with Pac-Mania and Galaga '88 unlocked right from the start and different menu music.

This compilation includes 16 games, except for the Game Boy Advance, which only includes five games:

- Pac-Man † (1980)
- Ms. Pac-Man † (1982)
- Galaga † (1981)
- Galaxian (1979)
- Dig Dug † (1982)
- Pole Position (1982)
- Pole Position II (1983)
- Rolling Thunder (1986)
- Rally-X † (1980)
- Bosconian (1981)
- Dragon Spirit (1987)
- Sky Kid (1985)
- Xevious (1983)
- Mappy (1983)
- Pac-Mania (1987)
- Galaga '88 (1987)

† indicates the five games included in the Game Boy Advance version. This version is similar to the original Namco Museum for that console, which also includes five games and no score-saving capability. 50th Anniversary replaces Galaxian and Pole Position with Pac-Man and Rally-X.

This is the first edition of Namco Museum with actual arcade game emulation using the original game ROM images (although voice sounds in Rolling Thunder, sounds for both Pole Position games and Xevious are stored in .wav files). Also, the GameCube version allows the player to insert a limited number of credits, about five or six, by repeatedly pressing the Z button when the game first starts, but then players can only exit to the main menu during gameplay. The PS2, Xbox, and PC versions allow the player to exit a game at any time, but skip being able to add credits. For Dragon Spirit, Pac-Mania and Galaga '88, the continue features from the original arcade versions have only been retained in the Windows PC version of the collection. It is also the last edition of Namco Museum to be released in North America by Namco as an independent company, before merging with Bandai later in 2006.

The Windows PC version was negatively received because it contains StarForce protection and does not run on Windows Vista or newer.

=== Namco Museum DS ===
Namco Museum DS was released on September 18, 2007.

The collection includes ten games:

- Pac-Man (1980)
- Galaga (1981)
- Xevious (1983)
- Super Xevious (1984)
- Galaxian (1979)
- Mappy (1983)
- The Tower of Druaga (1984)
- Dig Dug II (1985, two versions)
- Pac-Man Vs. (2003)

This game also allows access to each game's DIP switches, but some arcade-exclusive options are left out such as the "Rack-Test" on Pac-Man. It was re-released as part of a "Dual Pack" bundle with the Nintendo DS version of Pac-Man World 3 in North America on October 30, 2012.

=== Namco Museum Remix ===
Namco Museum Remix was released on October 23, 2007 for Wii. This compilation contains both the original arcade versions and "remix" versions of several games:

- Cutie Q (1979)
- Dig Dug (1982)
- Galaxian (1979)
- Gaplus (1984)
- Mappy (1983)
- Pac & Pal (1983)
- Pac-Mania (1987)
- Super Pac-Man (1982)
- Xevious (1983)
- Pac 'n Roll Remix
- Galaga Remix
- Pac-Motos
- Rally-X Remix
- Gator Panic Remix

When played on multiplayer, the Miis are used. Galaga Remix on this compilation is not the same as the Galaga Remix iOS application.

=== Namco Museum Virtual Arcade ===
This collection was released for the Xbox 360 on November 4, 2008, in North America, May 15, 2009, in Europe, June 3, 2009, in Australia and November 5, 2009, in Japan. Namco Museum Virtual Arcade is made up of two sets of games. The first is Xbox Live Arcade, which includes nine Xbox Live Arcade games. These are identical to the digital Xbox Live Arcade versions but are present on the game-disc. These games can be selected from the compilation's menu or, only while the game disc is in the console, accessed directly from the Xbox Live Arcade menu. The next set is Museum, which also includes Museum games, although these are the ones accessible directly from the disc. However, they do not come with achievements or online play. Namco Museum Virtual Arcade is the first Namco Museum game to include Sky Kid Deluxe (1986), while all of the rest were already or previously available on consoles. In common with other disc releases that include full Xbox Live Arcade games on-disc (like Xbox Live Arcade Unplugged for example), installation of the game disc to the Xbox 360 HDD is disallowed.

Xbox Live Arcade Games

- Dig Dug (1982)
- Galaga (1981)
- Galaga Legions (2008)
- Mr. Driller Online (2008)
- Ms. Pac-Man (1982)
- New Rally-X (1981)
- Pac-Man (1980)
- Pac-Man Championship Edition (2007)
- Xevious (1983)

Museum Games

- Baraduke (1985)
- Bosconian (1981)
- Dig Dug Arrangement (2005)
- Dig Dug II (1985)
- Dragon Buster (1985)
- Dragon Spirit (1987)
- Galaga '88 (1987)
- Galaga Arrangement (2005)
- Galaxian (1979)
- Grobda (1984)
- King & Balloon (1980)
- Mappy (1983)
- Metro-Cross (1985)
- Motos (1985)
- Pac & Pal (1983)
- Pac-Man Arrangement (2005)
- Pac-Mania (1987)
- Pole Position (1982)
- Pole Position II (1983)
- Rally-X (1980)
- Rolling Thunder (1986)
- Sky Kid (1985)
- Sky Kid Deluxe (1986)
- Super Pac-Man (1982)
- The Tower of Druaga (1984)

The Arrangement games are the same as they were on Namco Museum Battle Collection for PSP, although New Rally-X Arrangement is not included in this compilation. Additionally, on all games, the original 2-player modes from the original arcade versions (where applicable) do not appear here; all games are one-player only. The Xbox Live Arcade games do not have multiplayer either with the exception of Mr. Driller Online's online mode. The Xbox Live Arcade games can only be played when the disc is inside the system. The games must be downloaded from Xbox Live Marketplace for their regular prices in order for the games to be retained in the system's game library.

=== Namco Museum Essentials ===
Namco Museum Essentials was released on January 29, 2009. It includes:

- Pac-Man (1980)
- Galaga (1981)
- Dig Dug (1982)
- Xevious (1983)
- Dragon Spirit (1987)
- Xevious Resurrection (2009)

PlayStation Home included a virtual arcade space with sample versions of the games. The PlayStation Store also had a free trial version that only includes the first at the few levels of Pac-Man, Galaga, Dig Dug and Xevious. Both the demo and the full version were delisted from the PlayStation Store on March 15, 2018.

=== Namco Museum Megamix ===
An updated version of Namco Museum Remix for the Wii, which was released on November 16, 2010 in North America only. It adds additional arcade games and an additional "Remix" game. It adds a level select feature to all of the arcade games except Cutie Q.

- Bosconian (1981)
- Cutie Q (1979)
- Dig Dug (1982)
- Dig Dug II (1985)
- Galaga (1981)
- Galaxian (1979)
- Gaplus (1984)
- Grobda (1984)
- King & Balloon (1980)
- Mappy (1983)
- Motos (1985)
- New Rally-X (1981)
- Pac & Pal (1983)
- Pac-Man (1980)
- Pac-Mania (1987)
- Rally-X (1980)
- Super Pac-Man (1982)
- Xevious (1983)
- Grobda Remix (2010)
- Pac-Motos (2007)
- Pac 'n Roll Remix (2007)
- Galaga Remix (2007) (completely different from the Galaga Remix iOS application)
- Rally-X Remix (2007)
- Gator Panic Remix (2007)

=== Namco Museum (Nintendo Switch) ===
Namco Museum
- Developer: Bandai Namco Studios
- Publisher: Bandai Namco Entertainment
- Series: Namco Museum
- Platform: Nintendo Switch
- Release: WW: July 28, 2017
- Genre: Various
- Modes: Single player, multi player

Simply titled Namco Museum, it was developed for the Nintendo Switch and released on July 28, 2017 on the Nintendo eShop. Much like Namco Museum DS, the game includes a remake of Pac-Man Vs.. It contains the following games:

- Pac-Man (1980)
- Galaga (1981)
- Dig Dug (1982)
- The Tower of Druaga (1984)
- Sky Kid (1985)
- Rolling Thunder (1986)
- Galaga '88 (1987)
- Splatterhouse (1988)
- Rolling Thunder 2 (1990)
- Tank Force (1991)
- Pac-Man Vs. (2003)

Due to the violent nature of Splatterhouse, this is the first Namco Museum game to be rated T for Teen by the Entertainment Software Rating Board. A retail release bundled with Pac-Man Championship Edition 2 Plus, titled Namco Museum Arcade Pac, was released on September 28, 2018.

=== Namco Museum Mini Player ===
Namco Museum Mini Player is a dedicated handheld console shaped like a miniature arcade cabinet developed by My Arcade that includes 20 Namco games and was released by Bandai Namco Entertainment on June 24, 2019. While it includes some games that originated on home consoles, the games included that did originate in arcades are based on their original arcade versions. The games included are:

- Battle City (1985)
- Dig Dug (1982)
- Dig Dug II (1985)
- Dragon Spirit (1987)
- Galaga (1981)
- Galaxian (1979)
- Mappy (1983)
- Pac-Attack (Sega Genesis version) (1993)
- Pac-Man (1980)
- Pac-Mania (1987)
- Pac-Man 2: The New Adventures (Sega Genesis version) (1994)
- Phelios (1988)
- Rolling Thunder (1986)
- Rolling Thunder 2 (1990)
- Rolling Thunder 3 (1993)
- Sky Kid (1985)
- Splatterhouse (1988)
- Splatterhouse 2 (1992)
- The Tower of Druaga (1984)
- Xevious (1983)

=== Namco Museum Collection ===
Namco Museum Collection is a series of video game compilations for the Evercade handheld console which was released on May 22, 2020.

Unlike other compilations, the games in these compilations are based on their home console versions (NES/Famicom, SNES/Super Famicom, and Genesis/Mega Drive) rather than arcade versions.

==== Collection 1 ====
- Battle Cars (1993, SNES)
- Dig Dug (1985, NES)
- Galaxian (1984, NES)
- Libble Rabble (1994, SNES)
- Mappy (1984, NES)
- Mappy Kids (1989, NES)
- Metal Marines (1994, SNES)
- Pac-Man (1984, NES)
- Quad Challenge (1991, Genesis)
- Star Luster (1985, NES)
- Xevious (1984, NES)

==== Collection 2 ====
- Burning Force (1990, Genesis)
- Dig Dug II (1986, NES)
- Dragon Spirit: The New Legend (1989, NES)
- Galaga (1985, NES)
- Pac-Attack (1993, SNES)
- Phelios (1990, Genesis)
- Splatterhouse 2 (1992, Genesis)
- Splatterhouse 3 (1993, Genesis)
- The Tower of Druaga (1985, NES)
- Warpman (1985, NES)
- Weaponlord (1995, SNES)

=== Namco Museum Archives ===
Namco Museum Archives Vol. 1 and Namco Museum Archives Vol. 2 were both released on June 18, 2020 for the Xbox One, PlayStation 4, Nintendo Switch, and Steam outside of Japan. Developed by M2 and B.B. Studio, the two volumes are localized versions of the Japanese compilation Namcot Collection, featuring Namco-published games for the Nintendo Entertainment System and Family Computer. Vol. 1 contains an 8-bit demake of Pac-Man Championship Edition, and Vol. 2 contains a homebrew conversion of Gaplus.

==== Vol. 1 ====
- Dig Dug (1985)
- Dragon Buster (1987)
- Dragon Spirit: The New Legend (1989)
- Galaxian (1984)
- Mappy (1984)
- Pac-Man (1984)
- Pac-Man Championship Edition (2020)
- Sky Kid (1986)
- Splatterhouse: Wanpaku Graffiti (1989)
- The Tower of Druaga (1985)
- Xevious (1984)

==== Vol. 2 ====
- Battle City (1985)
- Dig Dug II (1986)
- Dragon Buster II: Yami no Fūin (1989)
- Galaga (1985)
- Gaplus (2020)
- Legacy of the Wizard (1987)
- Mappy-Land (1986)
- Mendel Palace (1989)
- Pac-Land (1985)
- Rolling Thunder (1989)
- Super Xevious: GAMP no Nazo (1986)

== Reception ==
Aggregate review scores
Game	GameRankings	Metacritic
Vol. 1	74.33%	N/A
Vol. 2	65.50%	N/A
Vol. 3	66.20%	N/A
Vol. 4	57.00%	N/A
Vol. 5	55.00%	N/A
Namco Museum Namco Museum 64	(N64) 73.43% (DC) 56.63%	(GBA) 79
Namco Museum		(Xbox) 59 (GC) 62 (PS2) 72
Namco Museum Battle Collection		73
Namco Museum: 50th Anniversary		(Xbox) 62 (GC) 60 (PS2) 61 (GBA) 60 (PC) 52
Namco Museum DS		67
Namco Museum Remix		49
Namco Museum Virtual Arcade		63
Namco Museum Essentials		64
Namco Museum Megamix		53
Namco Museum (Switch)		72

In August 1996, Namco reported accumulated sales of 600,000 units for the Namco Museum series in Japan alone. In the United States, The NPD Group in 2010 listed Namco Museum among the all-time top ten best-selling video games in the United States. The franchise has sold a total of at least 14.087 million copies worldwide. (Note: Namco Museum series: Namco Museum Vol. 1 sales: 1.65 million units; Namco Museum Vol. 3 sales: 2.24 million units; Namco Museum series Japan sales: 1 million (1998); Namco Museum Encore sales: 51,303 units; Namco Museum 64 sales: 1.04 million units; Namco Museum (GBA) sales: 2.96 million units; Namco Museum (PS2) sales: ≈1.80 million units; Namco Museum 50th Anniversary sales: 241,000 units; Namco Museum Battle Collection Japan sales: 79,527 units; Namco Museum Vol. 2 (PSP) sales: 24,934 units; Namco Museum DS Japan sales: 33,393 units; Namco Museum Remix Japan sales (first week): 1,700 units; Namco Museum Virtual Arcade Japan sales (first week): 5,912 units)

The four reviewers of Electronic Gaming Monthly gave Volume 1 an 8.125 out of 10, citing the excellent quality of the emulation and the interesting virtual museum content. Mark Lefebvre summarized that "Namco has given gamers what they've always been asking for: old titles." Next Generation likewise complimented the emulation quality and the virtual museum, and concluded that for those interested in retro compilations, "this is as good as this sort of thing gets." They scored it four out of five stars. Maximum gave it three out of five stars, reasoning that "On the one hand, this is a collection of six indisputably classic games, three of which rank among the most influential titles in the history of videogames. On the other hand, all the games on the disk are over ten years old, and influential or not, they're definitely well past their sell by date. Pole Position may have revolutionised the racing genre in 1982, but would you really choose to play it over Ridge Racer Revolution in 1996?" While GamePro found that all of the games save ToyPop remained great fun, the reviewer criticized the absence of the voice samples from Pole Position and compared the 3D museum unfavorably to the bonus content in Williams Arcade's Greatest Hits. He concluded the compilation to be worth renting at the least, and a must-have for retro gaming fans.

Reviews for Volume 2 were also mixed to positive, though most critics found the selection of games weaker than that of Volume 1. The four reviewers of Electronic Gaming Monthly gave Volume 2 a 7.125 out of 10, with all four remarking that the compilation had two or three genuine classics, with the remaining three or four games being mediocre and overly obscure. However, they disagreed on which games fell into which group; for example, Dan Hsu said that "Super Pac-Man stinks", while Crispin Boyer called it "the best reason to buy NM2" and "the height of the yellow pellet-eater's evolution." Jeff Gerstmann of GameSpot similarly commented, "While Mappy, Xevious, Gaplus, and Super Pac-Man are infinitely playable, the lesser-known Grobda and Dragon Buster are mediocre at best." He gave the compilation a 7.1 out of 10, praising the charm of the antiquated graphics and sound effects and the still potent gameplay. Next Generation picked Grobda, Dragon Buster, and Mappy as the mediocre games in the compilation, reasoning that "all are examples of game genres that have evolved way beyond these originals, and with good reason." They scored it two out of five stars. In direct contradiction to GameSpot and Next Generation, GamePro said that of the six games, "Super Pac-Man's weak control makes it the biggest disappointment, while Dragon Buster's action/adventure swordplay and Grobda's rapid-fire tank shooting hold up the best." They recommended the compilation for "those who enjoy simple, classic gameplay".

Volume 3 continued the trend of increasingly mixed reviews for the series. Jeff Gerstmann and Next Generation both commented that Dig Dug, Ms. Pac-Man, and Galaxian are genuine classics, Pole Position II is good but suffers from the absence of the voice clips from the arcade version, The Tower of Druaga has aged poorly, and Phozon was a terrible game to begin with. However, while Gerstmann concluded the collection to be "a real letdown" after the first two volumes and advised gamers to skip it, giving it a 5.6 out of 10, Next Generation concluded that "the number of true classics on Volume 3 outweigh the ones that never should have been unearthed", and gave it three out of five stars. GamePro approved of both the entire set of games and the quality of the emulation, and deemed Volume 3 "must-have arcade fun". Though Electronic Gaming Monthly never reviewed Volume 3, they named it a runner-up for "Best Compilation" (behind Street Fighter Collection) at their 1997 Editors' Choice Awards.

Volume 4 saw a particularly steep decline in the series' critical standing, with most critics agreeing that of the five games included, only Ordyne and Assault were at all worthwhile. Gerstmann gave it a 4.5 out of 10, and said the collection "is just plain depressing. It contains five games, and most of them are little known games that were little known for a reason." Electronic Gaming Monthly's review team gave it a 5.75 out of 10. The team was evenly split: Shawn Smith and Crispin Boyer, each voting a 6.5 out of 10, found the interesting museum content and the two or three enjoyable games make the collection worthwhile, while Dan Hsu and Sushi-X both gave it a 5.0 and said it was a disappointment compared to the earlier volumes. Both Gerstmann and GamePro commented that the first three volumes of Namco Museum had exhausted the series concept and Namco's backlog of genuine classics, and that Namco should have let the series end with volume 3.

== See also ==
- List of Bandai Namco video game compilations
