= Final Blaster =

1990 video game

- Developer: Nova
- Publisher: Namco
- Series: Bosconian
- Platform: PC Engine
- Release: JP: September 28, 1990
- Genre: Scrolling shooter
- Mode: Single-player

Final Blaster (Note: Japanese: ファイナルブラスター, Hepburn: Fainaru Burasutā) is a 1990 vertically scrolling shooter developed by Nova and published by Namco for the PC Engine. Controlling the Blaster Mark II "Phoenix" starfighter, the player is tasked with wiping out the Bosconian alien race before they destroy Earth. Gameplay involves shooting down enemies and avoiding projectiles — power-ups can be collected to increase the player's abilities. It is the third and final game in Namco's Bosconian series.

Development of the game was originally by Namco subsidiary N.H. System, but following their bankruptcy earlier in 1990 development was then handed to Japanese developer Nova. Aisystem Tokyo assisted with programming. Final Blaster received mostly favorable reviews, being praised for its colorful graphics, unique gameplay mechanics and soundtrack, although was criticized for being too difficult and for being unable to stick out from other shooters on the system. It was digitally re-released for the Japanese Wii Virtual Console in 2008.

== Gameplay ==
Screenshot

Final Blaster is a vertically scrolling shooter. Controlling a starfighter, the Blaster Mark II "Phoenix", the player is tasked with wiping out the Bosconian forces before they destroy all of mankind. The Blaster starts with a "vulcan gun" to fire projectiles at enemies — collecting red "power pods" dropped by certain enemies will increase the amount of shots that the player can fire. Blue-colored power pods can also be found, giving the player access to new weapons such as piercing lasers or zig-zagging ring shots. By holding down the fire button, the Blaster can charge up energy and eventually morph into a raging firebird, capable of destroying anything in its path.

The game spans seven stages, featuring landscapes such as mechanical bases, asteroid fields and organic-like structures. Each stage also features a boss that must be defeated in order to progress. The player can also control the speed of the stage scrolling by moving up and down, which will respectively increase or decrease the scrolling. A "difficulty" meter is presented at the end of each stage, which determines how hard the next stage will be. Some of the enemies are taken from other Namco games, such as the invincible Bacura boards from Xevious.

== Development and release ==
Final Blaster was released for the PC Engine by Namco in Japan on September 28, 1990. Development was originally being handled by Namco subsidiary N.H. System, who previously developed the arcade game Märchen Maze, but was later transferred to Japanese studio Nova after N.H. System was dissolved earlier in 1990. Aisystem Tokyo, a "group company" of Aisystem, assisted with programming. It is the third and final entry in Namco's Bosconian series, taking place after the events of the 1989 arcade game Blast Off. Final Blaster was digitally re-released for the Japanese Wii Virtual Console on September 8, 2008. The game's soundtrack, compiled with music from Märchen Maze and Blast Off, was released by Japanese company Sweep Records on November 30, 2018.

== Reception ==
Reception

Review scores
Publication	Score
ACE	817/1000
Computer and Video Games	83%
Famitsu	26/40
Aktueller Software Markt	8/10
Power Play	63%

Final Blaster received favorable reviews, often being compared to Hudson Soft's Gunhed. Reviewers praised the game's colorful graphics, interesting gameplay mechanics and soundtrack, also some disliked its high difficulty level.

ACE favorably compared the game to Gunhed, praising its colorful graphics, gameplay mechanics and variety of enemies. They also praised the game's musical score and sound effects. Computer + Video Games found the detailed graphics, unique gameplay features and soundtrack to make it "pretty damn addictive", while German publication Aktueller Software Markt liked its soundtrack, gameplay and graphical style. Computer + Video Games also compared it highly to Gunhed, saying that it made for a worthy competitor to Hudson's title. In their debut issue, Raze magazine briefly noted that the game stuck out from other shooters on the PC Engine, alongside Sega's later cancelled Space Fantasy Zone. Japanese publication Famitsu praised its colorful graphics and callbacks to other Namco games such as Xevious.

German magazine Power Play was more divided on the game, finding its soundtrack to be average and for hardly sticking out among other shooters released for the console. They also disliked the levels for being too short. ACE said that the game's graphics, notably the player's ship, were too small, and that the high difficulty level could put off potential players. In contrast, Computer + Video Games found the game to not have much of a challenge, claiming that hardcore fans of the genre could easily complete it. Famitsu disliked the game for not being able to stick out among other games of its type and for being too difficult, alongside it having little to do with the original Bosconian outside of cameo appearances and the storyline.
