= Dragon Saber =

1990 video game

- Advertising flyer
- Developer: Namco
- Publisher: Namco
- Designer: Yoshihiro Sugiyama
- Composer: Shinji Hosoe
- Series: Dragon Spirit
- Platforms: Arcade, PC Engine
- Release: JP: December 1990; NA: May 1991; EU: 1991
- Genre: Scrolling shooter
- Modes: Single-player, multiplayer

Dragon Saber (Note: Japanese: ドラゴンセイバー, Hepburn: Doragon Seibā) is a 1990 vertically scrolling shooter video game developed and published by Namco for arcades. It was released in Japan in December 1990, and in North America and Europe in 1991. It is a sequel to Dragon Spirit.

== Gameplay ==
Screenshot of the game

Players control Huey and Siria, who transforms into a dragon and navigates various landscapes by air. Two players can play together in cooperative gameplay. Like the previous game, the player can either hold the attack button to spit flames, but with the added feature of a more powerful shot charged by letting go of the button. Bosses must be beaten to finish levels, with the final boss having a time limit that causes a game over if passed.

== Development ==
Dragon Saber was the creation of Namco artist Yoshihiro Sugiyama, being his first time as a planner for a game. Sugiyama wanted the game to feel like a true continuation of its predecessor Dragon Spirit in terms of its storyline and world, as he felt the NES sequel Dragon Spirit: The New Legend was mostly just a rehash of the original and had a rather generic premise. He also wanted the game to appeal to anyone instead of mostly hardcore shooter enthusiasts, and one that many could find a degree of satisfaction in. Once the story was completed, Sugiyama began work on the game's lore and fictional world, wanting it to be one that players hadn't seen before in similar games beforehand.

== Ports ==
The game was ported to the PC Engine in 1991. The arcade version was included in the Namco Museum Encore compilation for the PlayStation in 1997, as well as for the Wii's Virtual Console in 2008 (of the PC Engine version) and 2009 (of the original arcade version) in Japan. Hamster Corporation released the game as part of their Arcade Archives series for the Nintendo Switch and the PlayStation 4 in July 2022.

== Reception ==
Game Machine listed Dragon Saber as being the most popular arcade game of December 1990 in Japan.
