= Namco Museum (GBA video game) =

2001 video game

- Developer: Mass Media
- Publishers: WW: Namco; EU: Infogrames
- Series: Namco Museum
- Platform: Game Boy Advance
- Release: NA: June 11, 2001; JP/EU: December 7, 2001
- Genre: Various
- Mode: Single-player

Namco Museum (ナムコミュージアム, Namuko Myūjiamu) is a 2001 video game compilation developed by Mass Media and published by Namco for the Game Boy Advance. It contains ports of five of their classic arcade games, Ms. Pac-Man, Pole Position, Dig Dug, Galaga, and Galaxian.

== Compilation ==
Namco Museum for Game Boy Advance was one of the first compilations in the Namco Museum series to omit a virtual museum. The GBA version was released worldwide, and was a launch title for the system in North America. The following games, originally featured in Namco Museum Vol. 1 and Namco Museum Vol. 3 for the PlayStation, are included:

- Ms. Pac-Man (1982)
- Galaga (1981)
- Galaxian (1979)
- Pole Position (1982)
- Dig Dug (1982)

The GBA version does not retain high scores when powered off, which is also the case with Pac-Man Collection.

== Reception ==
Reception

Aggregate score
Aggregator	Score
Metacritic	79/100

Review scores
Publication	Score
AllGame	4/5
Electronic Gaming Monthly	7/10
Game Informer	7/10
Gamekult	3/10
GameSpot	7.2/10
GameSpy	82%
IGN	8.5/10
Jeuxvideo.com	4/20
Next Generation	3/5
Nintendo Power	4/5
Nintendo World Report	5.5/10

The game received "generally favorable reviews" according to the review aggregation website Metacritic. NextGen said of the game, "The emulation is perfect, though GBA's mono speaker warps the timbre of the occasional sound effect. [...] If you can actually see it, you'll love it." Bad Hare of GamePro called it "an old-school must-own." (Note: GamePro gave the game 4.5/5 for graphics, two 4/5 scores for sound and control, and 5/5 for fun factor.)

The game sold 2.4 million units in the U.S. and earned $37 million by August 2006. During the period between June 2001 and August 2006, it was the third-highest-selling game for handheld game consoles in that country. By December 2007, that number grew to 2.96 million units.
