= Namco Museum Vol. 1 =

1995 PlayStation video game compilation

- North American cover art
- Developer: Namco Hometek
- Publishers: Namco: NA: Namco Hometek; EU: Sony Computer Entertainment
- Director: Shinichirō Okamoto
- Producer: Shigeru Yokoyama
- Series: Namco Museum
- Platform: PlayStation
- Release: JP: November 22, 1995; NA: July 31, 1996; EU: August 17, 1996
- Genre: Various
- Modes: Single-player, multiplayer

Namco Museum Vol. 1 (Note: Japanese: ナムコミュージアムVOL.1, Hepburn: Namuko Myūjiamu Boryūmu 1) is a 1995 arcade video game compilation developed and published by Namco for the PlayStation. The collection includes seven arcade games developed by the company that were originally released in the 1980s, such as Pac-Man, Galaga and Pole Position. The compilation features a 3D open-world virtual museum that the player can interact with, the games being housed in themed rooms with exhibits, such as promotional flyers, cabinet artwork and instruction cards. Players can also view Namco product catalogs, promotional pamphlets and front cover scans of the company's Japanese press literature.

The game's development was directed by Shinichirō Okamoto, with Galaga creator Shigeru Yokoyama assigned as producer. The Namco Museum name was originally used for a chain of Namco-owned department stores in the early 1980s that sold goods based on Namco game characters.

Namco Museum Vol. 1 was met with mixed to favorable reviews from critics. Although its loading times and lack of appeal to modern players was criticized, it was praised for its replay value, virtual museum and included exhibits, as well as the selection of included titles. It would go on to sell 1.65 million units in North America alone and spawn five additional volumes, alongside similar collections for other platforms. A digital version of the game was released for the PlayStation Store in 2014 under the PSone Classics brand.

== Gameplay ==
PlayStation version screenshot, showing the player walking around the Pac-Man exhibit

Namco Museum Vol. 1 is a compilation of seven Namco-developed arcade games from the 1980s — Pac-Man (1980), Rally-X (1980), New Rally-X (1981), Galaga (1981), Bosconian (1981), Pole Position (1982) and Toy Pop (1986). Players can modify in-game settings, such as the starting number of lives, and can also enable the game's original boot-up sequence. Pole Position supports the Namco NeGcon for analog to compensate for the lack of an analog controller at the time, while Galaga and Pac-Man allow support for vertical monitors.

The collection uses a 3D virtual museum that the player can walk around and interact with, as opposed to a menu system like other similar compilations. Each of the included games have their own exhibit and a room themed after them. Exhibits contain a number of promotional material that can be viewed by the player, including instruction cards, arcade flyers, cabinet artwork and the game's circuit board. A "lounge" area can also be accessed in the main lobby containing other bits of Namco-related marketing material, including pamphlets, product catalogs and front cover scans of their Japanese video game magazine Namco Community Magazine NG.

== Development ==
Namco Museum Vol. 1 was released in Japan on November 22, 1995, in North America on July 31, 1996, and in Europe on August 17, 1996. Development was directed by Shinichirō Okamoto and produced by Galaga creator Shigeru Yokoyama. The Namco Museum name was originally used for a chain of Namco-operated department stores in the 1980s, which sold goods based on Namco game characters and had many of the company's earlier arcade games available to play. A digital version of the game was released onto the PlayStation Network under the PSone Classics lineup on September 30, 2014.

== Reception ==
Reception

Aggregate score
Aggregator	Score
GameRankings	74%

Review scores
Publication	Score
Consoles +	80%
Electronic Gaming Monthly	8.5/10, 8/10, 8/10, 8/10
Famitsu	7/10, 6/10, 8/10, 5/10
GamePro	4.5/5
IGN	8/10
Next Generation	4/5
Maximum	3/5
Fort Worth Star-Telegram	2.5/5

Namco Museum Vol. 1 was met with mostly mixed to favorable reviews from critics, who praised its virtual museum, exhibits and replay value, although some would criticize the lack of appeal towards modern demographics and long loading times. It holds a 74% on aggregator website GameRankings. It sold 1.65 million copies in North America as of December 2007.

Next Generation praised the collection's 3D museum and interchangeable features, although noted of the game's long loading time for viewing the promotional items. They recommended the compilation to fans of the included titles, concluding that it "is good as this sort of thing gets." IGN stated that the included titles "really have stood the test of time", saying that they still remain fun years after their original release. Four reviewers of Electronic Gaming Monthly highlighted the collection's excellent emulation quality and museum content, with one reviewer calling it one of the best video game compilations for the console, saying it is "a great addition to anyone's collection who couldn't pump enough quarters into the machine to fill his or her head." Consoles Plus recommended the collection to fans of the originals, tacking on that younger players would find them "nerdy and uninteresting."

In a more negative light, Maximum found most of the included games to be "well past their expiration date", particularly comparing Pole Position unfavorably to Namco's own Ridge Racer Revolution. They did state, however, that the aforementioned Pole Position, Galaga and Pac-Man were "indisputably classic" titles and noted their historical importance. Tommy Glide of GamePro labeled Toy Pop as the weakest title, calling it a "throwaway" game, while also saying the museum material was not as well-done as those found in Williams Arcade's Greatest Hits. He did, however, say it was worth owning for fans of the original arcade games, and at least worth renting.
