= Toy Pop =

1986 video game

- Advertising flyer
- Developer: Namco
- Publisher: Namco
- Designer: Takefumi Hyodoh
- Artist: Hiroshi Fuji
- Composer: Junko Ozawa
- Platforms: Arcade, Sharp X1
- Release: Arcade: JP: April 1986; X1: JP: 1989
- Genre: Multidirectional shooter
- Modes: Single-player, multiplayer

Toy Pop (Note: Japanese: トイポップ, Hepburn: Toi Poppu) is a 1986 multidirectional shooter video game developed and published by Namco for arcades. It was only released in Japan in April 1986. The game was later re-released as part of Namco Museum Vol. 1 for the original PlayStation in 1995.

== Gameplay ==
Screenshot of the game

Toy Pop is a top-down multi-directional shooter that can be played both single-player or with two players simultaneously. The first player plays as a wooden puppet named Pino, who resembles Pinocchio, and the second player plays as a doll named Acha, who resembles Little Red Riding Hood. The players venture through 44 floors (the game uses the toy-themed term "Box" as opposed to "Floor", to fit with the game's setting) collecting four gold hearts contained in jars on each floor in order to advance. Along the way, the players must open gift-wrapped containers concealing either weapons or score-increasing bonus items; these various weapons are used to defeat several different varieties of enemies (Heitai, Cars, Tanks, Domdoms, Trumps, Osaru, Robots and occasionally the evil wizard Mahou), with many typically vulnerable to only one type of weapon. On the 44th floor, the players battle the evil witch Majyo, who can only be defeated by finding all eight gold hearts scattered around the room.

== Development ==
Toy Pop was developed by Namco and produced by Takefumi Hyodoh. He had previously directed Battle City (1985), a well-received sequel to Tank Battalion (1980). This led him being transferred to a higher-ranking development department within the company and assigned to produce a new arcade game. Hyodoh, who hadn't taken the position of a planner before, struggled to adapt and worked slower than usual. Nonetheless, he created a prototype named Space Alamo where players fought enemy aliens in an open-world, science fiction-inspired setting, similar to Namco's previous game Warp & Warp (1981). Hyodoh's colleague, Yoshiro Kishimoto, suggested making it a fantasy game with characters and visuals that appealed to young girls. He took his suggestion and turned the game into one based around fairy tales and Christmas, making its characters toys and renaming it Toy Pop. The characters and artwork were created by Hiroshi Fuji, the artist and character designer for Valkyrie no Bōken, while the in-game sprites were drawn by Hiroshi "Mr. Dotman" Ono. Its ragtime-inspired soundtrack was composed by Junko Ozawa.

Toy Pop was released to arcades in Japan in April 1986, using the same hardware as Libble Rabble (1983). A conversion for the Sharp X1 was produced by Dempa Shinbunsha in 1989. Toy Pop did not garner much attention until 1995, when it was ported to the PlayStation through the compilation Namco Museum Vol. 1, alongside six other Namco arcade games from the early 1980s. The PlayStation version uses the original source code running through a JAMMA emulator, making it a near-perfect conversion. Toy Pop is also included in Namco History Vol. 1 (1997), a similar compilation released for Windows in Japan. In 2009, the game was released for the Wii's Virtual Console in Japan. Hamster Corporation released the game as part of their Arcade Archives series for the Nintendo Switch and PlayStation 4 in October 2022.

== Reception ==
Reception

Review scores
Publication	Score
AllGame	2.5/5
Technopolis	6/7

In Japan, Game Machine listed Toy Pop as being the country's twentieth most popular arcade game of May 1986.

== Legacy ==
A theme based on Toy Pop is featured in Pac-Man 99, as special DLC.
