= Rolling Thunder 2 =

1991 video game

- Arcade flyer
- Developer: Namco
- Publisher: Namco: EU: Sega (Mega Drive)
- Composer: Ayako Saso
- Series: Rolling Thunder
- Platforms: Arcade, Sega Genesis
- Release: Arcade: JP: March 1991; NA: 1991; Genesis: JP: November 19, 1991; NA: January 1992; EU: April 1993
- Genre: Run and gun
- Modes: Single-player, multiplayer
- Arcade system: Namco System 2

Rolling Thunder 2 (Note: Japanese: ローリングサンダー2, Hepburn: Rōringu Sandā Tsū) is a 1991 run and gun video game developed and published by Namco for arcades. It is the sequel to 1986's Rolling Thunder, retaining the same gameplay of its predecessor while adding cooperative gameplay for two players and improved graphics. Unlike the original, which was set in 1968, Rolling Thunder 2 has a more contemporary setting to go with its more futuristic design, as well as an optionally playable female character.

== Gameplay ==
Set in the 1990s, the Geldra organization, thought to have been eliminated during the first game, returns and is destroying several of the world's satellites in outer space. As in the original Rolling Thunder, the players must take control of a member of the WCPO's Rolling Thunder task force. Two players can now play simultaneously, with Player 1 as female agent Leila and Player 2 as male agent Albatross. Even though they possess different external appearances, including different handguns, the two characters have identical abilities. As with the original game, both Leila and Albatross can only take two physical hits from the enemies - and a hit from a bullet or other projectile such as a laser will result in an immediate death. Both are armed with a default pistol that has only limited ammunition; when bullets run out, their guns fire a slow "chaser" bullet instead. Players can also upgrade to a submachine gun (based on a Walther MP from the artwork) by entering marked doors - and when entering one of these marked doors, a counter appears indicating the number of remaining bullets left to be picked up, allowing one player to leave ammo for the other. Unlike in the original Rolling Thunder, pistol and machine gun ammunition is not carried over at the end of each level and players always start a new level with the minimum pistol rounds only.

The graphics are noticeably improved over the previous game and have a decidedly more futuristic look to go along with the game's modern setting; the game's main enemy characters, the Maskers, who were previously designed to look like hooded terrorists, are now cyborgs. Likewise, the game has more varied stage designs, with the first four stages taking place in a seaside resort in Florida, and the last four in a pyramid in Egypt; both locations actually being camouflaged Geldra bases.

== Reception ==
Reception

Aggregate score
Aggregator	Score
GameRankings	72.92%

The home version of Rolling Thunder 2 was well received. Its mostly highly positive review scores included 92% from Computer & Video Games, 23/25 from GamePro, 85% from Mean Machines, 90% from MegaTech, and, retrospectively, 8/10 from Sega-16. Reviews of the Virtual Console release were often more critical, including being rated 6/10 by GameSpot, 6.5/10 by IGN, and 8/10 by Nintendo Life.

Complex ranked Rolling Thunder 2 85th on their "The 100 Best Sega Genesis Games" list.

== Ports ==
A port for the Sega Genesis was released the same year. Both the Mega Drive port and the original arcade game were released for the Wii's Virtual Console on December 4, 2007, and October 27, 2009, respectively. Bandai Namco Entertainment released the game as part of their Namco Museum collection for the Nintendo Switch in 2017. Hamster Corporation released the game as part of the Arcade Archives series for the Nintendo Switch and PlayStation 4 in May 2023.
