= Dragon Buster =

1985 video game

- Sales flyer
- Developer: Namco
- Publisher: Namco
- Composer: Yuriko Keino
- Series: Dragon Buster
- Platforms: Arcade, Family Computer, MSX, PC-8801, PC-9801, X68000, Mobile phone
- Release: JP: January 1985; EU: May 1985
- Genres: Platform, dungeon crawl, action role-playing
- Mode: Multiplayer
- Arcade system: Namco Pac-Land

Dragon Buster (Note: Japanese: ドラゴンバスター, Hepburn: Doragon Basutā) is a 1985 action role-playing video game developed and published by Namco for arcades. It was released in Japan in January 1985 and Europe in May 1985. It was ported to the Family Computer (Famicom), MSX, and X68000; the latter version was later released for the Virtual Console in the same region on November 18, 2008. Dragon Buster has been ported for the PSP and is available as part of Namco Museum Battle Collection. It was followed by a Japan-only Famicom sequel, Dragon Buster II: Yami no Fūin, and was later followed by the PlayStation game Dragon Valor, which was both a remake and a sequel.

The game has side-scrolling platform gameplay and an overworld map similar to the later platform games for home consoles and personal computers. Dragon Buster was also the earliest game to feature a double jump mechanic, and one of the first to use a visual health meter.

== Plot ==
In an unnamed kingdom (known as Raxis in Dragon Valor), legend tells of a brave warrior who will rescue the land from the wrath of a fearsome dragon. Clovis, the son of the royal family's chief bodyguard, is a young swordsman who was sent to live and train with a monk in the forest as a youth after being disowned by his father due to mischievous behavior in his childhood. The kingdom's legend comes to light as a dragon and his minions raid the land and kidnap King Lawrence's 16-year-old daughter, Princess Celia. Clovis learns he is the hero foretold by the legend, and sets off for Dragon Mountain to slay the dragon, rescue Celia and restore order to the land.

== Gameplay ==
Arcade screenshot

The player must guide the hero Clovis through each round on to the Dragon Mountain to rescue his beloved Princess Celia. Every few mountains, Celia is rescued and the game restarts. Celia wears a different outfit each time she is rescued. As the player progresses through the round, they must choose various paths to take on to the castle. There are many paths to choose from and the number of these increases as the player gets to the higher rounds. The paths take the player to the individual levels of the round. There are multiple bosses on each level and many less powerful enemies scattered throughout each level. The player must find the boss that contains the exit on each level to proceed through the round and finally reach the castle. Clovis's vitality restores itself by 25% after each level is completed. The game ends when Clovis' vitality reaches zero.

There are five different types of levels: The Cave, The Tower, The Boneyard, The Mountain and The Ruins. Each of these levels boasts more of a particular type of monster than the others. For example, The Boneyard contains more of the boss Skeleton. The Cave is a mostly linear type of level, with mostly descents and horizontal movement. It boasts many bats and snakes. The Tower is notable for having many floors, and the player must do a lot of climbing in this type of level. The Boneyard is probably the most difficult type of level for having many enemies and paths to choose, and the player will most likely end up defeating every boss in the level before finding the boss that contains the exit. The Mountain has the player descend from the top of the mountain. The Ruins is a standard type of level with a bit of everything the other four types of levels contain. Finally, there is the Dragon Mountain at the end of each round. Every Dragon Mountain is the same, starting with a very long drop that takes the player to the Dragon's room to fight the Dragon.

== Ports ==
A port for the Famicom was developed by Tose. When the game was ported to the NEC PC-8801 computer by Enix, the port featured an introduction to the game and an entirely new ending, featuring cinema screens depicting a battle-torn Clovis and a teary-eyed Celia. Dragon Buster was also included as a hidden mini-game in Tales of the Abyss for PlayStation 2 and Nintendo 3DS. It was included in various Namco Museum compilations including Namco Museum Volume 2 for the original PlayStation, Namco Museum Battle Collection for PlayStation Portable, and Namco Museum Virtual Arcade for Xbox 360. Japanese publisher Hamster Corporation released an emulated version of the game for the Nintendo Switch and PlayStation 4 as part of the Arcade Archives line of digital releases in 2021.

== Reception ==
Reception

Review score
Publication	Score
Famicom Tsūshin	6/10, 6/10, 7/10, 7/10 (FC)

Dragon Buster was a hit in Japan, where Game Machine listed it on their March 1, 1985 issue as being the third most-successful table arcade unit of the month. Computer + Video Games liked the game's ease to newcomers and colorful graphics, saying it stood out from other arcade games at the time.

For the port for the Family Computer, reviewers in Famicom Tsūshin two reviewers found it fun to play with one complimenting that it was about three time the size of the original arcade game. One reviewer said the game looks a bit plain while another said the character movements were a bit "jerky" and that the music lacked the depth of the arcade version. One reviewer said they did not play the original arcade version that much and found it just to be a run-of-the-mill action-RPG. In Famicom Hisshoubon, the two reviewers praised the game saying it was even better than the arcade game. Two reviewers in Famicom Tsūshin and Famicom Hisshoubon complimented the grander scale of the game, with its 138 levels.
