= Namco Museum DS =

2007 video game compilation

- Developer: M2
- Publisher: Namco Bandai Games (Note: Released under the Namco brand outside North America)
- Series: Namco Museum
- Platform: Nintendo DS
- Release: NA: September 18, 2007; JP: October 11, 2007; EU: February 2008
- Genre: Video game compilation
- Modes: Single-player, multiplayer

Namco Museum DS (Note: Japanese: ナムコミュージアムDS, Hepburn: Namuko Myūjiamu Dī Esu) is a 2007 video game compilation developed by M2 and published by Namco Bandai Games for the Nintendo DS. It features eight previously released games published by Namco, seven of which were released in arcades and the other one being a port of Nintendo's multiplayer game Pac-Man Vs. (2003). Players are able to extensively customize each of the arcade games, with options available ranging from screen display and difficulty settings to being able to manually modify the DIP switches on a replica arcade system. A sound test menu and a "museum" aspect that lets the player see promotional material for each game in the collection is also included.

Namco Museum DS was first released on September 18, 2007 in North America. It was followed by a Japan release on October 11, and a release in Europe in February 2008. The collection received mixed reviews from critics, who were generally divided on the graphics quality that each game is presented in by default and selection of games provided, though praised the inclusion of Pac-Man Vs.

== Overview ==
A gameplay screenshot of Galaga in Namco Museum DS. The top screen demonstrates the gameplay, while the bottom screen offers customization options.

Namco Museum DS is a compilation of several games previously released by Namco, primarily ones released in arcades. All of the arcade games in the collection are ran through emulation. When playing a game, the top screen of the Nintendo DS by default shows the gameplay, while the bottom screen is devoted to options, allowing the player to change their controls. The player can also tweak how the game is displayed, being able to play it either vertically or horizontally, the former requiring the player to hold their DS on its side. Additional settings available to the player include ones that allow them to customize the difficulty of the game their playing, as well as a "hardcore" mode that allows the player to make several manual adjustments to the game by adjusting DIP switches on a simulated replica of the game's arcade system motherboard.

The collection includes seven arcade games: Galaxian (1979), Pac-Man (1980), Galaga (1981), Xevious (1983), Mappy (1983), The Tower of Druaga (1984), and Dig Dug II (1985). In addition, the player can unlock two secret games: Super Xevious (1984), and an older version of Dig Dug II. Alongside the arcade games, Namco Museum DS includes a re-release of Pac-Man Vs. (2003), a multiplayer version of Pac-Man that was originally developed by Nintendo and designed by Shigeru Miyamoto for the GameCube. The game supports up to four players, with one playing as Pac-Man and the others playing as ghosts that have to catch them. Due to the "Download Play" feature on the Nintendo DS, only one copy of the game is required, with the other players able to temporarily download the game to their system. The version of Pac-Man Vs. included in the collection is largely similar to the original release, though lacks the original's announcer voicelines.

The game features an introductory cutscene where characters from the different games in the collection interact with each other accompanied by their respective themes. The game also has a sound test menu, as well as a "museum". The sound test allows players to listen to each song and sound-effect from every game included in the collection. The museum allows the player to look at brief descriptions, screenshots, and promotional material from the history of the respective game.

== Release and reception ==
Reception

Aggregate score
Aggregator	Score
Metacritic	67/100

Review scores
Publication	Score
Eurogamer	7/10
GameSpot	6.5/10
GamesRadar+	2/5
IGN	7.2/10
Nintendo Power	8/10
Pocket Gamer	3/5

Namco Museum DS was developed by M2 and published by Namco Bandai Games. It was programmed by M2's lead programmer, Akira Saitō, while the soundtrack was composed by Manabu Namiki. A demo of the collection was playable at the 2007 Tokyo Game Show. The collection was originally released on September 18, 2007 in North America. It was later released in Japan on October 11, and in Europe in February 2008. In 2012, a dual-pack that included both the collection and Pac-Man World 3 (2005) was released.

Namco Museum DS received mixed reviews from critics. On review aggregator website Metacritic, it holds a score of 67 out of 100 percent based on 19 critic reviews.

The selection of games included was divisive. Kristan Reed of Eurogamer felt that it could be satisfactory to a casual player, but believed that it was the developers being stingy when compared to the game selection of Namco Museum: 50th Anniversary, which had 16 games. Jeff Gerstmann of GameSpot did not believe that the collection was anything particularly noteworthy aside from the portability factor. Mike Cook of Pocket Gamer felt that it was a decent collection for those wanting to "carry around a piece of history in their pockets", but was bogged down by the quality of the games themselves, which he believed didn't age well. The inclusion of Pac-Man Vs. was viewed positively by several reviewers, with Reed believing that it brought up the value of the collection to an average consumer, but was likely still not enough when compared to previous Namco Museum titles.

Dan Amrich of GamesRadar+ heavily criticized the way that the games were presented in terms of graphics, stating that the smaller screen size of the DS compared to that of the original arcade machines led to some pixels disappearing entirely and color mapping errors. Craig Harris of IGN stated that the games by default looked like an "exaggerated mess". Scott Pelland of Nintendo Power felt that the graphics quality inhibited the feel of playing the games authentically, but that it was a "small price to pay" for an otherwise good collection.

Some reviewers saw the amount of customization options made available for each game as a positive inclusion. Cook felt that it was fun to mess around with arcade circuitry and a "nice touch", though believed it was no different than inputting a cheat code. Amrich believed that the feature was a "gesture to make up for" the poor graphics quality.
