= Dragon Valor =

1999 video game

- PAL cover art
- Developer: Now Production
- Publishers: Namco: NA: Namco Hometek; EU: Sony Computer Entertainment
- Director: Atsushi Nakanishi
- Producers: Yukito Ohayashi; Masami Shimotsuma; Yasuhiro Noguchi
- Programmers: Etsurō Kishi; Naoki Hashitani; Seita Miyauchi
- Writers: Atsushi Suzuki; Masami Shimotsuma; Hirofumi Ishimura
- Composers: Nobuhiro Ōuchi; Ayako Yamaguchi
- Series: Dragon Buster
- Platform: PlayStation
- Release: JP: December 2, 1999; EU: June 30, 2000; NA: October 16, 2000
- Genres: Action role-playing, platform
- Mode: Single-player

Dragon Valor (ドラゴンヴァラー, Doragon Varā) is a 1999 action role-playing game developed by Now Production and published by Namco for the PlayStation. It is the second sequel to Dragon Buster.

In the Dragon Valor world, dragons are powerful monsters. The player's role as a Dragon Valor is to slay them with a magical sword passed down through successive generations.

Similar to Phantasy Star III, Dragon Valor differs from other platform action games of the time because who the protagonist marries changes future playable characters, plot events, and which ending the player receives.

== Gameplay ==
In each chapter of Dragon Valor the player character travels from one location to another, defeating a variety of enemies along the way, eventually ending the chapter by fighting a dragon. Players usually control one character per chapter, while some characters may be played twice. Basic commands remain almost the same with each character.

Players can collect items to boost their hit points, magic points, attack, and defense. Players can also obtain 'tomes' after defeating specific enemies which grant access to spells.

The game's in-world currency is called Val, which is used to buy recovery potions (which are used immediately upon purchase), status-improving items, or items that may be sold or traded. Items earned through trade are usually status-improving items.

There are three different paths based on player choices. The names of each path coincides with the three magic swords found on those paths: Azos, Soul, and Kadum.

=== Narrative Gameplay Example ===
This decision is in Chapter One: Avenger Dragon Valor to encourage player's engagement with the narrative. This is the main type of decision players will make throughout the story.

Save or Abandon Princess Celia?

If Princess Celia is rescued the following chapter focuses on the heir to the throne of Raxis Arlen Barclay. If Princess Celia is not rescued the following chapter focuses on Kodel Barclay who makes a living stealing from pirates.

== Plot ==
=== Background Lore ===
Note: These events happen before the game story begins.

Dragons and gods waged war against each other at the cost of everyone else's lives. Four magic swords were created to both stop the war and prevent others. Azos, Kadum, and Soul were created from angels while Igunis was created from a god. Dragons lost the war and many were killed off.

Dragons found a way to survive through an unusual form of shape shifting. They can manifest themselves from the "evil in the human heart." When a person is consumed with hate this allows a dragon to manifest itself by turning that person into a dragon or dragon halfling, creating an internal struggle for humans which is only overcome by thinking of their loved ones. The most powerful dragon and main antagonist-Dahaka-could not be killed and was imprisoned behind the Gates of Gehenna. These Gates can only be unlocked using Azos, Kadum, and Soul together.

=== In-Game Plot Synopsis ===
Each generation of playable characters follows a similar plot. The protagonist has an external threat (either a human political rival or a dragon) where they use a magic sword to eradicate it. If they do not have a magic sword already, they must go out in search for one. If they already have one they will often search for additional magic swords.

As they travel from one location to another the protagonist will face a variety of enemies. Some enemies are one-offs (animal-, fungi-, humanoid- and plant-based in design) while others are re-occurring, such as the dragon halfling Halfas. Re-occurring enemies are after political power, the power of Dahaka, or both. Re-occurring enemies are working to get the magic swords for Dahaka's release from the Gates of Gehenna. Multiple protagonists struggle with their hatred from the harm several of the antagonists cause and have to fight against turning into a dragon themselves.

Once their goals are achieved, the protagonist goes home and puts into place who will be the next protagonist. Some protagonists will have the option to save a damsel-in-distress mid-adventure. If they choose to save her she will marry him and their child will be the next chapter's protagonist. If they choose not to, the protagonist will choose another woman from their chapter to marry or will adopt a child.

== Introduction ==
Note: These sections happen before the player is on a specific narrative path. Chapter 2: Kodel is the last chapter before a specific path is locked in.

=== Prologue: Dragon Valor ===
The first player character is a young commoner living in the land of Jirat called Clovis Barclay. His sister, Elena, is killed by a dragon and is used as Clovis's motivation to venture out and become a Dragon Valor.

Dragon Valor provides a tutorial on player actions and its magic system. Clovis defeats the dragon only for it to come back to life in an alternate form. Clovis, in a fit of rage, swears to find and kill it again.

=== Chapter 1: Avenger ===
Note: Clovis does not belong to any narrative path but his actions can decide whether the player embarks on the Azos, Soul, or Kadum paths.

Clovis arrives in the Raxis Kingdom during his search. Clovis speaks to Carolina, an inventor, who explains to Clovis what is happening. The Azale Knights, a military force of the Jirat Kingdom went rogue, attacked Raxis Castle, and took Princess Celia hostage (Clovis has the option to rescue her). Their leader is The Black Knight, Volef, who is aided by an alchemy practicing samurai called Raimun.

Clovis and Volef fight multiple times with Clovis winning each time. The last time Clovis re-defeats him Volef flees and ends up leading Clovis right to the dragon. The dragon burns Volef to death as Clovis arrives. Upon killing the dragon Clovis believes his life no longer has purpose. If Clovis saves Celia they have a son called Arlen (go to Soul Path Section).

=== Chapter 2: Kodel ===
Clovis leaves for Kadeli City with Carolina. They settle down and have a son named Kodel. Until one day—unexplainably—Clovis leaves. Carolina waits for Clovis' return while Kodel earns money by stealing from pirates.

Kodel discovers that one of his pirate targets, Robere, has the sword Clovis wielded, Azos. Kodel takes the weapon as his own and rescues Fannah, Robere's daughter. They are attacked by a knight. Kodel kills the knight but then receives a message from its spirit. The message was for Robere from Clovis. The spirit then steals Fannah's soul and locks it away (Kodel is given the option to rescue her later).

Kodel travels to the abandoned fortress near the destroyed Linton City to look for his father. Kodel finds Clovis and they duel. After Kodel wins Clovis explains he left because there is evil growing in his heart. He is also trying to contain a dragon living within the volcano near Linton City. Kodel swears to Clovis that he will defeat the dragon, but his father must return home.

Kodel journeys to the volcano and faces a two-headed dragon. Once victorious he returns to the abandoned fortress to find Robere and Fannah also waiting for him. Clovis returns to Carolina. The ending depends on whether or not Kodel released Fannah's imprisoned soul. Fannah loves him for freeing her and have a son called Phillip (go Kadum Path Section) or she hates him and he goes out on his own to travel (go to Azos Path Section).

== Soul Path ==
=== Chapter 2: Arlen ===
The Raxis Kingdom split into two factions, the East and West. The East is ruled by the royal family. The West, named Alkemia, is led by Lodonya who is Volef's son and the commander of the Azale Knights. There is an organized resistance to Lodonya's rule called the West Raxis Liberation Army who want reunification.

During an attack on Raxis Castle Arlen is knocked off its battlements while trying to rescue Celia. Arlen is swept downstream to the Falayd Caverns where he is found (knocked out) by Shalya, the leader of the West Raxis Liberation Army, and her two lieutenants Simon and Franco. Arlen recovers and goes to Alkemia, being the unwitting decoy for Shalya's forces. He decimates the Alkemian garrison and fights through the guards while Shalya rescues Celia.

Arlen learns Lodonya intends to revive a dragon. Arlen faces Lodonya and bests him. Lodonya flees to the dragon's cavern where he asks it to consume his soul to combine their power. The dragon complies but Arlen prevails.

Because Lodonya's body was never recovered the civil war in the Raxis Kingdom ends. Arlen marries Shalya and they name their son Felippe.

=== Chapter 3: Felippe ===
Felippe disguises himself to enter a martial arts tournament in the neighboring Jirat Kingdom. Partway through a match between Felippe and Knight Vilherm Jirat Kingdom's prime minister Zomas takes Princess Jeanne hostage. He demands Felippe's Azos in exchange. Felippe surrenders the sword to Zomas who flees.

Felippe borrows Vilherm's sword and begins to hunt down Zomas. Zomas, now in his estate, presents Azos to Krassel. Krassel gives Zomas the power of a dragon halfling in exchange for Azos. When Felippe fights Krassel he learns Vilherm's sword is too fragile in comparison to Krassel's power and Azos and retreats.

When Felippe learns of the magic sword Soul sealed in the Jirat Ruins he decides to take it. On his journey back Jeanne reveals that Zomas has led a coup and Felippe explains he will save her kingdom. He encounters Zomas who is mentally deranged from his transformation. Felippe has multiple fights against Zomas who gradually degrades into a monster who cannot move or speak.

Krassel calls a dragon to kill Felippe and claim Soul. Felippe defeats the dragon but Krassel flees with Azos. He and Jeanne marry uniting the kingdoms of Jirat and Raxis into the Empire of Jirat. They have twin children, Anna and Mihael.

=== Chapter 4: Anna ===
The chapter opens with Anna journeying to the Saldo Ruins in search of a magic sword accompanied by a now elderly Vilherm. Vilherm instructs her to wait at the entrance, but she worries and goes in. Anna finds Vilherm battered but alive.

Halfas feels he has found a worthy opponent and decides to "strengthen" Anna through attempting to kill her. Vilherm sacrifices himself to save her life. Anna, filled with hatred, swears to attain vengeance. Before Halfas leaves he tells Anna he will be awaiting her arrival in Mount Verea—and offers a chance to claim the other two magic swords.

Anna journeys to the Demon's Lair inside of Mount Verea. Halfas mockingly offers to fully heal Anna when she finds him; she counters by saying his confidence will be his undoing. Anna defeats Halfas who awaits his death. He states only all three swords combined will kill him. Krassel appears before she can and steals Azos and Kadum. Anna rushes off in pursuit ignoring Halfas's pleas for death.

Anna then faces and defeats the dragon Talon (believing it to be Krassel) and lowers her guard. Krassel then steals Soul, unites the power of all three swords, and calls directly upon the magical powers of Dahaka. He sets off a violent explosion and Anna disappears. With no word from or about Anna, Mihael organizes the Azale Knights and heads off in search of his twin sister.

=== Chapter 5: Mihael ===
Mihael organizes the Azale Knights to rescue Anna. He gets separated from the Azale Knights but continues on alone to the now fallen Raxis Kingdom. Miheal fights his way through the Raxis City Ruins to the dilapidated Raxis Castle until he finds her. Anna assures Mihael she will be alright, but a dragon has stolen the swords. Mihael heads deeper into Raxis Castle where there is now a passage to the Underworld.

Upon entering the Underworld Mihael finds the guardian of the sword Igunis standing before him. Igunis entrusts itself to Mihael who ventures deeper into the Underworld. He arrives too late to stop Dahaka's release. Dahaka toys with Mihael to foster rage and transform him into a dragon. Mihael almost gives in when Anna's words snap him back to reality allowing him to fight.

Mihael eventually prevails and uses Igunis to re-seal the Gates of Gehenna. Dahaka is sealed away but his final words linger: as long as evil exists, Dahaka will one day return. Mihael leaves and en route to Raxis Castle a red crystal appears before him with Anna inside. The crystal shatters releasing an unconscious Anna into Mihael's arms.

Mihael gives Anna an un-wanted piggy-back ride. The two speculate on their ancestry as revealed by Igunis. Giving up on speculation Anna gently 'spurs' Mihael to make him go faster. Mihael tells her to hold on and breaks into a run as they both laugh.

== Kadum Path ==
=== Chapter 3: Phillip ===
Phillip becomes a sailor and takes Azos with him. During a voyage the ship Phillip is on is attacked and he is knocked overboard. Phillip washes ashore on Paley Island where he meets Princess Jeanne and Vilherm. The village they live in is attacked by Vappula's forces. Vappula unleashes the dragon accompanying him to attack Phillip and steal Azos. Phillip manages to defeat the dragon and Vappula flees.

Phillip travels to the Paley Ruins where he defeats the guardian and acquires the sword Kadum. As he exits the ruins he finds his ship's captain, Vilherm, and Jeanne waiting at the entrance for him. Jeanne asks to borrow one of the swords but is unable because both Azos and Kadum have chosen Phillip. Instead of lending her a sword Phillip helps Jeanne by killing the demons who are attacking her people. The two eventually marry and have twins, Anna and Mihael.

Vappula meets with his fellow minions, Halfas and Krassel. Both are displeased that he lost to a Dragon Valor and is executed by Halfas.

As time passes the sword Azos is stolen.

=== Chapter 4: Mihael ===
Mihael—accompanied by a now elderly Vilherm—journeys to the Saldo Ruins in search of a magic sword. Vilherm instructs Mihael to wait at the entrance. He complies until waiting grows thin. Journeying through the ruins Mihael finds Vilherm battered, but alive.

Halfas feels he has finally found a worthy opponent and decides to "strengthen" Mihael, attempting to kill him. Vilherm sacrifices himself to save Mihael's life. With Vilherm's sacrifice Mihael begins his hatred of Halfas; he swears to kill him to avenge Vilherm. Halfas leaves and informs Mihael that he will be awaiting his arrival in Mount Verea, and offers a chance to claim the other two magic swords.

Mihael journeys to Mount Verea, fighting through its Fortress City and reaches the Demon Lair. Halfas mockingly offers for Mihael to be fully healed before they fight. Mihael counters that Halfas' confidence will be his downfall. Halfas is defeated and waits for the finishing blow.

Mihael intends to end Halfas' life, but Krassel steals Soul and Azos. Mihael then faces the dragon Talon (thinking it is Krassel), defeats it, and lowers his guard. Krassel then steals Kadum, unites the power of the three swords, and calls directly upon the magical powers of Dahaka. He sets off a violent explosion and Mihael disappears. With no word heard from or about him Anna sets out to rescue her twin brother.

=== Chapter 5: Anna ===
Anna goes searching in the fallen Raxis Kingdom to find Mihael. Fighting her way through Raxis City and into the dilapidated Raxis Castle she finds a wounded Mihael. He explains the theft of the swords by Krassel. Anna heads off into the dungeons to enter the Underworld. There she comes face-to-face with the guardian for the sword, Igunis. Igunis entrusts itself to Anna. Taking up Igunis Anna continues on and defeats Krassel.

She arrives too late as Dahaka is unleashed on the world. Dahaka torments Anna to foster her rage and transform into a dragon. She almost gives in, but Mihael's voice resounds in her mind telling her the words she needs most to release her anger. Anna rushes forward and defeats Dahaka. As Dahaka lies there Anna uses Igunis as the key to seal the Gates of Gehenna. As Dahaka is returned behind the seal he leaves a final warning: as long as evil exists, he will once again return. Anna and Mihael return home.

== Azos Path ==
Note: This narrative path is chosen in Chapter 2 Kodel listed in the Introduction Section.

=== Chapter 3: Gerome ===
During Kodel's travels he encounters and teaches a young thief called Gerome how to be a swordsman. They form a chosen family. Gerome eventually surpasses Kodel's swordsmanship skills. After Kodel dies from disease Gerome returns to thievery. He steals a map where the Dahaka cult keeps their treasure—The Heathen Cathedral.

Inside the Heathen Cathedral's Crypt Gerome meets the shaman Sarah, chained to a wall. She is the sole survivor of her shaman village and is being used as a sacrifice for a dragon (Gerome has the option to rescue her). Gerome defeats the dragon and is able to use its bones with Sarah's magic to make and sell Wisdom Stones.

Halfas appears but Sarah drives him away with her magic. Gerome offers a partnership with Sarah who has nowhere else to go. They sell the newly created Wisdom Stones for a hefty profit and marry. Sarah gives birth to their daughter who they name Anita.

=== Chapter 4: Anita ===
Anita becomes an exorcist. The kingdoms neighboring the fallen Raxis Kingdom petition her to go kill the demons residing within. She accepts and once finished finds a lithograph containing information on the three magic swords.

Realizing she would be unstoppable with all three swords Anita sets off in search of Soul and Kadum. Fighting her way through the Jirat Ruins she finds its guardian already defeated. Halfas appears and praises her skills as a Dragon Valor. She denies being a Dragon Valor stating she is an exorcist. He curses her, saying she has a month to kill him or she will die. He leaves after disclosing he may be found along with Soul and Kadum at Mount Verea.

Anita goes to Mount Verea and finds Halfas. She defeats Halfas and as she prepares to kill him using all three swords Krassel steals Kadum and Soul. Anita goes in pursuit, believing Halfas that she needs to use all three swords to kill him and break her curse. Anita kills a dragon, thinking it is Krassel, and lowers her guard.

Krassel steals Azos, unites the power of the three swords, and calls upon the magical powers of Dahaka. He sets off a violent explosion and Anita disappears. After not hearing from her, Gerome sets out to find her.

=== Chapter 5: Gerome/Anita ===
Note: Gerome is the only playable character to appear from a previous generation, and remains playable for the first two stages. Afterwards, play reverts to Anita.

Gerome

Gerome goes to the Raxis Kingdom killing demons through its City and Castle Ruins until he reunites with Anita. Anita explains she was cursed by Halfas and is researching its removal. She pridefully refuses Gerome's help. Gerome, somewhat sarcastically, "permits" her to continue.

Anita

After receiving her father's blessing Anita goes to the Raxis Catacombs which are now a portal to the Underworld. In the Underworld she encounters the guardian Igunis—the fourth and strongest magic sword. Igunis explains the Gates of Gehenna sealing Dahaka have been opened and he will come back to life to torment the world.

Using Igunis' power Anita kills Krassel and rushes to prevent Dahaka's revival—but fails. Dahaka tries to transform Anita into a dragon. Anita nearly succumbs, but with assistance from Gerome stands firm. Anita fights and defeats Dahaka. She uses Igunis to seal the Gates of Gehenna—and Dahaka. Dahaka states that as long as evil exists he will as well, troubling Anita.

As Anita begins the trek back to Saldo she finds Gerome's body encased in a crystal of blood. Upon her approach the crystal shatters and Gerome stands up to greet an exhausted Anita. He piggyback carries Anita as they head home. Anita asks why it is humans haven't turned into dragons considering there is evil in human hearts. Gerome points out she did not turn into a dragon and asks if she loves him. Anita replies she does. Gerome's theory is that as long as there is love in the human heart humans will never turn into dragons.

== Main characters ==
- Anita Barclay [daughter of Gerome and Sarah] with skills as a swords-woman from her father and magic from her mother she becomes an exorcist.
- Anna Barclay [daughter of Felippe/Phillip and Jeanne, sister to Mihael] is the princess of the Jirat Kingdom. She is a skilled swords-woman.
- Arlen [son of Celia and Clovis, husband to Shayla, father of Felippe] although born the Prince of the Raxis Kingdom, young Arlen is forced to fight as a knight due to its fragmentation.
- Clovis Barclay [brother to Elena, husband to Celia/Carolina, father of Arlen/Kodel] is a commoner who is skilled in sword fighting. Clovis is one of the two characters who can be used twice in the same play through being used as the player character in the Prologue and Chapter 1.
- Felippe Barclay [son of Arlen and Shalya, husband to Jeanne, father to Anna and Mihael] was known as the best swordsman in the Raxis Kingdom. Felippe was forced to give up the sword Azos, but managed to obtain another magic sword, Soul.
- Gerome Barclay [husband to Sarah, father to Anita] is a young thief whom Kodel saves from death. Kodel taught him swordsmanship which Gerome goes on to surpass.
- Kodel Barclay [son of Carolina and Clovis, husband to Fannah, father to Phillip] supports his family by using the swordsmanship he learned from his now-disappeared father. He has a rough-hewn personality. Depending on player choice Kodel is either married and becomes wealthy or continues on as a travelling adventurer.
- Mihael Barclay [son of Felippe/Phillip and Jeanne, brother to Anna] is the prince of the Jirat Kingdom and a skilled swordsman.
- Phillip Barclay [son of Kodel and Fannah, husband to Jeanne, father to Anna and Mihael]. A skilled swordsman and sailor. He was the first Dragon Valor to possess two magic swords.

== Non-Player Character Protagonists ==
- Carolina [mother of Kodel, wife of Clovis Barclay] is an inventor-in-training. In Kadeli she follows her father's footsteps and becomes an inventor.
- Celia [mother of Arlen, wife of Clovis Barclay], is the Princess of the Raxis Kingdom. Soon Clovis, now the King, dies young leaving Celia behind with their son Arlen.
- Elena Barclay [sister of Clovis Barclay] her death starts the narrative of Dragon Valor.
- Fannah [daughter of Robere, wife of Kodel, mother of Phillip].
- Jeanne [mother of Anna and Mihael, wife of Phillip/Felippe] is the princess of the Jirat Kingdom. Depending on whether the player is Phillip or Felippe, her backstory, intent, and the events she partakes in differ. Jeanne will fall in love with and marry either Phillip or Felippe and elevate them to being King.
- Robere [father of Fannah, trustee to Clovis] is a pirate.
- Sarah [mother of Anita, wife of Gerome] is a powerful shaman.
- Shayla [mother of Felippe, wife of Arlen] is the leader of the West Raxis Liberation Army and then Queen of the Raxis Kingdom.

== Antagonists ==
- Arktos is an ice dragon that resides in the coldest and most frozen place, The Glacier, featured in the second chapter "The Renegade Knights".
- Azi Dahaka (shortened to Dahaka) is the main antagonist of the game. He is the final boss and the plot of the latter three-fifths of the story revolve around the Cult of Dahaka. Dahaka is a black-and-purple dragon who can use magic to transfix the player character in place. He can double in size and gain a larger variety of magic powers (including the ability to regenerate lost health).
- Hades is a massive bipedal skeletal dragon with powered by dark magic and fights using powerful magic orbs that explode upon impact.
- Halfas is one of the three dragon halflings who are in the Cult of Dahaka. Halfas has something akin to a sense of honor, in that he offers a challenge to the player character. This challenge is to try to strengthen them with emotions like hatred, bloodlust, and vengeance, in order to transform them into dragons.
- Hellfire and Inferno is a two-headed dragon that lives in the deep fiery pit in the volcano, featured in the second chapter 'Berserker'.
- Krassel is one of the three dragon halflings who are in the Cult of Dahaka.
- Londonya [son of Volef, leader of Alkemian Knights and Alkemia] is an antagonist in the second chapter. Londonya hates Arlen and his family because he believes that Arlen's father, King Clovis, killed his father.
- Rage/Titan is the first antagonist of the game. This dragon is the one who kills Clovis' sister Elena and starts off the events leading to the battle with Dahaka. In the prologue after it is slain by Clovis it resurrects into a new bulky, multi-limbed, wingless, form (Titan). Rage/Titan is the only dragon to be fought in 2 different chapters.
- Raimun [aid to Volef] is an alchemist and samurai who appears in the first chapter, Avenger.
- Talon is a dragon fought in Chapter 4. It has a very unusual insectoid appearance vaguely resembling a rhinoceros beetle. Talon has hidden appendages that appear when it is injured at half health: an extra head inside its mouth, long claws, and a tail. It also has the ability to spit out slug-style creatures to attack. The dragon shares many similarities with the G-virus boss, Dr. William Birkin, in the video game Resident Evil 2.
- Tempest is a dragon that appears in the third chapter. Tempest is a large avian dragon covered in feathers.
- Thunder is a dragon that appears in the third chapter. It is a yellow-skinned dragon that fights using powerful bolts of electricity.
- Vappula is one of the three dragon halflings who are in the Cult of Dahaka.
- Volef [father to Londonya, leader of the Azale knights] The Azale Knights were responsible for the murder of the King, Queen and Prince of the Raxis Kingdom and the kidnapping of Princess Celia.
- Zomas is the prime minister of the Jirat Kingdom.

== Reception ==
Reception

Aggregate score
Aggregator	Score
Metacritic	57/100

Review scores
Publication	Score
AllGame	3.5/5
CNET Gamecenter	6/10
Edge	3/10
Electronic Gaming Monthly	5/10 (Note: In Electronic Gaming Monthly's review of the game, one critic gave it a score of 6/10, and the rest gave it each a score of 4.5/10.)
Famitsu	25/40
Game Informer	7.5/10
GameRevolution	C
GameSpot	5.6/10
IGN	6.5/10
Next Generation	3/5
Official U.S. PlayStation Magazine	3/5
RPGFan	62%

The game received "mixed" reviews according to the review aggregation website Metacritic. Chet Barber of NextGen said, "It may not blow your socks off, but Dragon Valor is a solid title worthy of any gamer's attention." In Japan, Famitsu gave it a score of 25 out of 40.

GamePro said of the game, "With dismal features and an unexciting storyline, this is one RPG that doesn't have any valor to its name." (Note: GamePro gave the game two 2.5/5 scores for graphics and fun factor, 3/5 for sound, and 4.5/5 for control.)
