= Pac-Man Collection =

Video game compilation

- North American cover art
- Developer: Mass Media
- Publisher: Namco
- Series: Pac-Man
- Platform: Game Boy Advance
- Release: NA: July 12, 2001; EU/AU: December 7, 2001; JP: January 11, 2002
- Genre: Various
- Mode: Single-player

Pac-Man Collection (Note: Japanese: パックマンコレクション, Hepburn: Pakkuman Korekushon) is a 2001 video game compilation developed by Mass Media and published by Namco for the Game Boy Advance. It includes four titles in the Pac-Man series — the original Pac-Man (1980), Pac-Mania (1987), Pac-Attack (1993), and Pac-Man Arrangement (1996), the latter of which was originally exclusive to the arcade game Namco Classic Collection Vol. 2. Each game includes customizable features such as the ability to alter the number of starting lives or difficulty, with all being stripped of multiplayer features.

Development of the game was headed by California-based studio Mass Media, who previously worked on several Namco Museum collections for other platforms. It was first announced on April 24, 2001 under the name Pac-Man Fever, before being presented at the 2001 Electronic Entertainment Expo (E3) tradeshow. Pac-Man Collection was a commercial success — by 2007 it sold over 2.9 million copies worldwide, making it the ninth best-selling Game Boy Advance game of all time. Critics reacted positively to the title's selection of games and customizable features, although some criticized the exclusion of games such as Ms. Pac-Man and inability to save high-scores. It was re-released as a budget title in Japan in 2006, and later digitally on the Wii U's Virtual Console in 2014.

== Games ==
In-game screenshot showing the player highlighting Pac-Man Arrangement in the main menu

Pac-Man Collection includes four games from Namco's Pac-Man franchise — the original Pac-Man (1980), Pac-Mania (1987), Pac-Attack (1993) and Pac-Man Arrangement (1996), the latter of which was originally exclusive to the compilation arcade game Namco Classic Collection Vol. 2. Pac-Man, Pac-Mania and Arrangement were originally released for arcades, while Pac-Attack was first released for both the SNES and Sega Genesis in North America and Europe. Ms. Pac-Man is excluded from the compilation due to the game already being present in the Namco Museum collection for the system from a few months prior. The original Pac-Man can be displayed in either full-screen or a scrolling display. Excluding Pac-Attack, each of the games allow the player to alter the number of lives, game difficulty and other related options. All four of the games are also stripped of any multiplayer features. Pac-Attack and Pac-Mania also have their soundtracks cut down due to storage capacity, while Arrangement's is in a lower bit-rate.

== Development and release ==
Pac-Man Collection was released on July 12, 2001 in North America, December 7, 2001 in Europe and Australia, and on January 11, 2002 in Japan. Development of the game was headed by California-based studio Mass Media, who previously worked with Namco on several Namco Museum collections for various platforms. The game was first announced on April 24 under the working title Pac-Man Fever, before being presented at the 2001 Electronic Entertainment Expo (E3) convention in Los Angeles, California. It is Namco's second title released for the Game Boy Advance, following Namco Museum from earlier that year. The game was distributed by Infogrames in Europe. In Japan, the game was re-released under the Value Selection budget brand on February 2, 2006. Alongside the Family Computer conversion of Pac-Land, it was digitally re-released for the Wii U Virtual Console on June 11, 2014 to celebrate Pac-Man's inclusion as a playable character in Super Smash Bros. for Nintendo 3DS & Wii U.

== Reception ==
Reception

Aggregate score
| Aggregator | Score |
|---|---|
| Metacritic | 79/100 |

Review scores
| Publication | Score |
|---|---|
| AllGame | 4/5 |
| GamePro | 4/5 |
| GameSpot | 8/10 |
| GameSpy | 80/100 |
| IGN | 9/10 |
| Pocket Games | 7.5/10 |

Pac-Man Collection was received positively by reviewers, who commended the title for its selection of titles and customizable features. It holds a 79/100 on aggregator website Metacritic, indicating "generally favorable reviews". The game was also a commercial success; it became the 6th best-selling handheld game in North America between January 2000 and August 2006, selling over 1.6 million copies and generating more than $25 million in revenue. By 2007 it sold over 2.9 million copies worldwide, making it the ninth best-selling Game Boy Advance game of all time.

IGN, who gave it the "Editor's Choice" award, stated that the game's selection of titles made it an easy sell for Pac-Man fans, while Allgame called it a must-own for its customization features and inclusion of Pac-Man Arrangement. Allgame also praised the collection's sharp graphics and impressive 3D effects in games such as Pac-Mania. In their brief review, GamePro noted of the game's responsive controls and fast-paced action of Pac-Man Arrangement. GameSpy found the selection of titles and solid emulation quality to make it "worthwhile addition to any retro fans portable library", saying that the original Pac-Man alone made it worth a purchase. GameSpot especially praised its high-quality ports and replay value, saying that it helps prove that classic video games and handheld systems blend well together. Pocket Games magazine liked that Pac-Attack help bring a change of pace from the other included titles, while also praising the game's emulation quality and included titles.

Some critics disliked the game's lack of additional titles and inability to save high scores. GameSpy particularly disliked the compilation's lack of Ms. Pac-Man, the "only Pac sequel truly worth playing", while IGN felt slightly disappointed towards the exclusion of games such as Super Pac-Man and Pac-Man Plus. IGN was also slightly critical of the game's lack of high-score saving, although noted that the games automatically wiping scores anyway made this somewhat forgivable. Pocket Games found Pac-Attack to be the weakest of the four due to its lack of innovation compared to other similar puzzle games. French publication Pocket Magazine was the most negative towards the game, calling it "old junk" for its lack of multiplayer features and high score saving, while also disliking its price point for being too high.
