= Motos =

1985 video game

- Japanese arcade flyer
- Developer: Namco
- Publisher: Namco
- Platforms: Arcade, Amstrad CPC, Commodore 64, X68000, ZX Spectrum
- Release: September 20, 1985: Arcade; JP: September 20, 1985 C64; NA/EU: 1987 CPC; EU: 1987 Spectrum; EU: 1987 X68000; JP: November 24, 1989
- Genre: Action
- Modes: Single-player, multiplayer
- Arcade system: Namco Mappy

Motos (Note: Japanese: モトス, Hepburn: Motosu) is a 1985 action video game developed and published by Namco for arcades. It was only released in Japan on September 20, 1985. It was ported to personal computers by Mastertronic, which unlike the arcade version was released outside Japan.

== Gameplay ==
Screenshot

The player must take control of the eponymous Motos, a bumper car whose goal is to force enemies over the edge of the playfield by bumping up against them; however, all the enemies are capable of doing exactly the same thing to it. "Power parts" and "jump parts" can also be collected during the 62 rounds, which will give Motos extra bumping power and the ability to jump over gaps in the playfield.

== Ports ==
The game was ported to the Commodore 64, Amstrad CPC, and ZX Spectrum by Binary Design and published by Mastertronic in 1987. It was also released in 1998 as part of Microsoft Revenge of Arcade for Windows, the first release of the arcade version in North America.

The game was released in 2005 as part of Namco Museum Battle Collection for the PlayStation Portable, as well as Namco Museum Virtual Arcade for the Xbox 360 on November 4, 2008. The game is also present in two Namco Museum compilations that were originally released exclusively in Japan: Namco Museum Encore for the PlayStation, in 1997, and Namco Museum Volume 2 for the PlayStation Portable, in 2006. The latter also features an updated "Arrangement" version of the game (made in the spirit of the 6 original "Arrangements") with 3D graphics. Hamster Corporation released the game as part of their Arcade Archives series for the Nintendo Switch and PlayStation 4 in May 2022.

A "remixed" version of the game featuring Namco's signature character, Pac-Man, was released as part of Namco Museum Remix under the name of Pac-Motos - and Namco Museum Megamix also included the original game along with the remix.

== Reception ==
Reception

Award
Publication	Award
Sinclair User	SU Classic

In Japan, Game Machine listed Motos on their October 15, 1985 issue as being the fifth most-successful table arcade unit of the month.
