= Namco Classic Collection Vol. 2 =

1996 video game

- Japanese promotional sales flyer
- Developer: Namco
- Publisher: Namco
- Series: Namco Classic Collection
- Platform: Arcade
- Release: NA: March 1996; EU: March 1996; AU: March 1996; JP: March 1996
- Genre: Various
- Modes: Single-player, multiplayer
- Arcade system: Namco ND-1

Namco Classic Collection Vol. 2 (Note: Japanese: ナムコクラシックコレクションVol. 2, Hepburn: Namuko Kurashikku Korekushon Boryūmu Tsu) is a 1996 compilation arcade game developed and published by Namco. It is a collection of four of Namco's popular games: Pac-Man (1980), Rally-X (1980), New Rally-X (1981) and Dig Dug (1982). Alongside the original games, three new "Arrangement" games based on each game are included.

It is a follow-up to Namco Classic Collection Vol. 1, released in 1995.

== Overview ==
Namco Classic Collection Vol. 2 is a compilation of arcade games released by Namco with seven games in total (four re-released games and three original games). Games featured in this compilation are Pac-Man, Rally-X, New Rally-X (which is found in a selectable menu alongside Rally-X) and Dig Dug. Instead of being emulated, these games were completely recreated from scratch for the hardware. Additions and changes to these games include Rally-X and New Rally-X being played in a vertical resolution instead of the original horizontal resolution and the ability for every game to end after a certain round and displaying a new ending sequence (the games can be set to endless play in the game settings). Namco Classic Collection Vol. 2 also has optional setting to toggle which games can be played, the machine can be set to play Pac-Man only, Dig Dug only or Rally-X only. The setting also changes the game's title screen.

Alongside the original arcade games, just like the first volume, Namco Classic Collection Vol. 2 features 3 brand new "Arrangement" games for each series, Pac-Man Arrangement, Rally-X Arrangement and Dig Dug Arrangement. Each Arrangement game features updated graphics, simultaneous 2-player gameplay (minus Rally-X Arrangement, which is for 1 player only), and new features.

=== Pac-Man Arrangement ===
Pac-Man Arrangement is a 1996 arcade game in the Pac-Man series. Pac-Man Arrangement follows Pac-Man as the player guides him to eat all the dots in the maze while avoiding Clyde (Blinky), Pinky, Inky and Blinky (Clyde). This game features a name error in which Blinky and Clyde's names are swapped. Alongside retaining identical gameplay from the original game, a few new gimmicks have been added as well. The game features 23 rounds in total split into 6 worlds, each with their own unique maze similar to Ms. Pac-Man, with the last round taking the form of a boss fight.

A fifth, yellow ghost who wears glasses named Kinky is introduced in this game. Kinky wanders around and can merge with other ghosts to give them special abilities, such as giving Clyde (Blinky) the ability to dash, giving Pinky the ability to jump close to Pac-Man, giving Inky the ability to create a mirror clone which can harm Pac-Man, and giving Blinky (Clyde) the ability to produce big Pac-Dots. Kinky, unlike the normal ghosts, can be eaten without the need of a power pellet, and produces power pellet effects when Kinky is eaten. The number of times Kinky appears increases throughout each World.

New features include Pac-Man being able to dash temporarily after eating a Dash Pellet, being able to jump to another part of the maze using a Jump Pad, and 4 new power-up pills with different functions, such as increasing Pac-Man's speed temporarily, trapping the ghosts in the ghost box, being able to create a mirror Pac-Man that can eat objects like the normal Pac-Man, being able to digest big Pac-Dots without slowing down, and stairs which prevent Pac-Man from changing directions when he enters them.

Pac-Man Arrangement is split up into six worlds, each having its own different theme, including a toy box world, a water land, a world themed off the original Pac-Man game, a grass land, a pyramid, and a mechanical base. The final round takes the form of a boss fight, where Pac-Man must defeat the Ghosts' Mech by eating all the Pac-Dots on the maze to destroy the Kinky clones and eventually the mech itself.

The game also incorporates two-player simultaneous play. A second player can join in anytime during gameplay, and will control a green Pac-Man, in which the player can help the other player complete the stage or compete for the highest score. At the end of every round when two players are present, a score total screen will appear and the player who scores the most wins per round. At the end of the game, the player with the highest score total overall wins the game. The game also features continues, however unlike the other arrangement games featured, the player's score is reset when they continue a game after losing all their lives.

=== Rally-X Arrangement ===
Rally-X Arrangement is a 1996 arcade game in the Rally-X series. Unlike the other games in the collection, Rally-X Arrangement does not feature a two-player mode. In this game, the player must guide the Blue Car to collect all the flags in each area while finishing the course before their fuel runs out and avoids collision with the red enemy cars.

New features to this game include the addition of items usable by the player. In the game, there is the addition of a new, square and cyan colored flag that gives the player an item when they get the flag. Items provide useful help to the player, including giving the player the temporary ability to crush enemy cars and rocks, slow the enemy cars down or make them run away, etc.

Three new variants of enemy cars appear in this game alongside the original ones, with the Touring car having the ability to continuously gain speed, the Drag car being invisible from the radar until a special item is collected, and the Neo Formula cars which can emit smokescreen like the player.

The game features new challenge stages which involve the player driving in a rock field to grab yellow flags while avoiding collision with rocks which deplete the cars fuel, to reach the goal point before time runs out.

The game features 15 rounds, with each portion of the rounds having its own theme, such as a park, a desert, an Egypt-style ruin a mountain and a city. The final round involves collecting all the flags on the course and getting to the goal point of the area. The game, like the other Arrangement games also has a continue feature.

=== Dig Dug Arrangement ===
Dig Dug Arrangement is a 1996 arcade game in the Dig Dug series. Dig Dug Arrangement follows Taizo Hori (aka Dig Dug) as he attempts to rid each area of the monsters that reside underground by pumping them up until they explode, crushing them with falling rocks or knocking them out with explosions.

New gimmicks include new power-ups, several new enemies and unique stage gimmicks, New enemies include aggressive versions of Pooka and Fygar, a Unicorn enemy that can perform a sprint attack, an Explosive Robot that causes an explosion when it is defeated, a Dig Dug impostor that can pump up Dig Dug, and from the Cosmo Gang games, Dodongadon and Jammer.

New stage gimmicks include big rocks that can fall directly to the ground, destroying all earth below it, Cosmo Balls from Cosmo Gang that will slide towards the direction marked on the ball, destroying all enemies in its path and pipes that the player cannot dig through. The game features new power-ups, such as increasing Dig Dug's speed, increasing the length, speed or power of his pump, hourglasses that can cause enemies to become inflated, rods that can cause meteorites or bullets to fall from the sky, a forcefield that protects Dig Dug from attacks, balances that increase the number of points earned from enemies, and two colored gourds with the red one giving Dig Dug ten points, or the green one causing effects to happen around the stage.

Dig Dug Arrangement features 50 rounds, which is split up into three islands, the first island having 24 rounds, the second island having 5 rounds which is hidden from view initially, and then the moon, which has the remaining 20 rounds, which is also hidden from view initially. Each round has its own unique layout and features a different visual theme, such as a grassy terrain, a factory plant, a desert, an ice land, and the moon. Out of the 50 rounds present, 5 of them are boss fights, which involve Dig Dug attempting to defeat a giant Pooka or Fygar in a wide open space by using explosive robots or ray guns to damage the boss and deplete its health bar. Unlike the other rounds, enemies come in infinite numbers in these rounds. The giant Pooka boss walks around the stage, while the giant Fygar acts the same but can perform a fire attack.

The game incorporates two-player simultaneous play. The second player controls a yellow Dig Dug and can cooperate with the other player or play against them, competing for the highest score. Both players can use their pump to attack the other player and can crush them with rocks or balls. Killing the other player awards bonus points to the player who defeated said player. At the end of each round, the player with the highest score at the end of the round wins the round, and their player flag is displayed on the world map screen. The player with the highest score at the end of the last round wins the game.

== Legacy ==
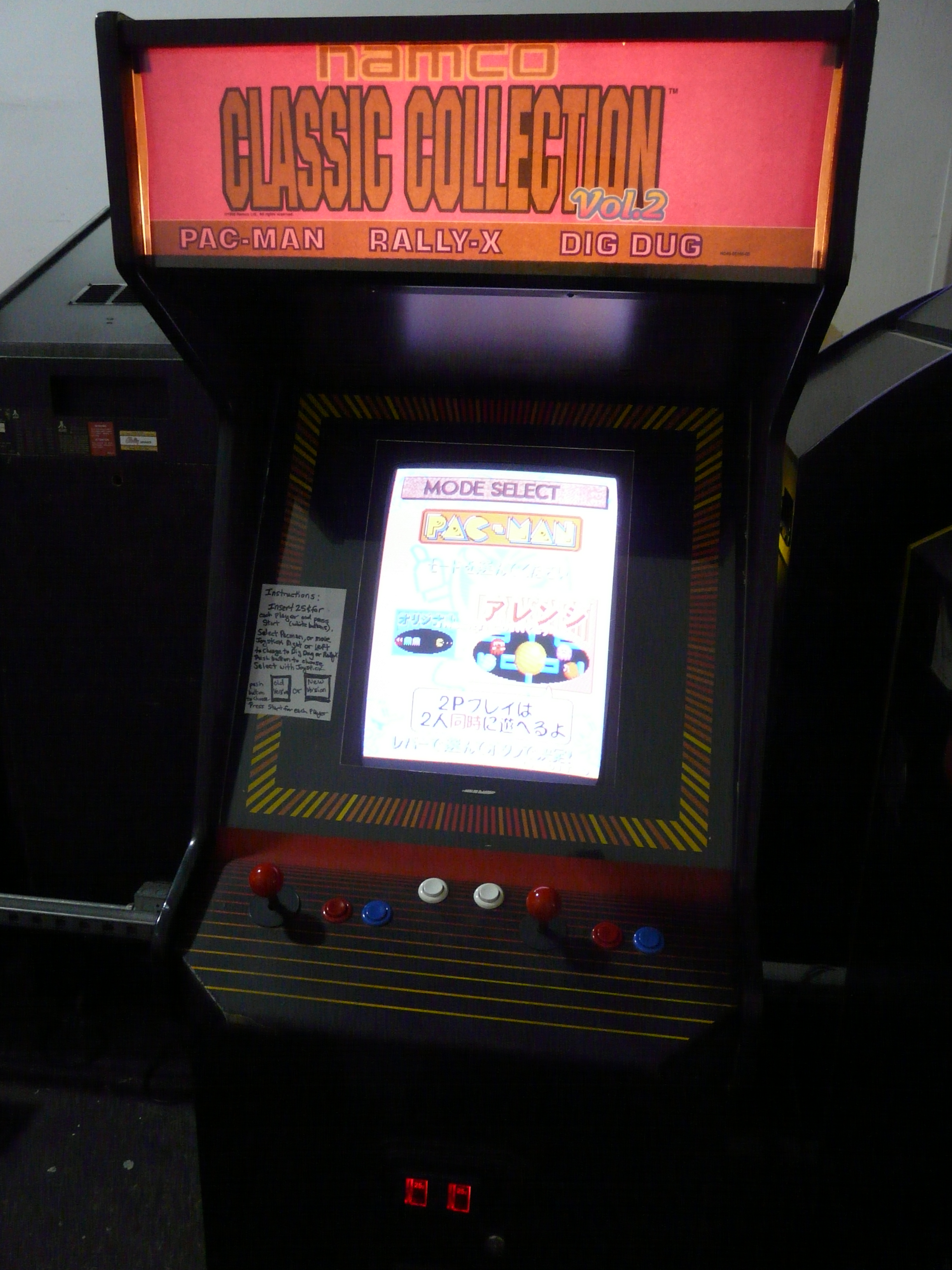
A Namco Classic Collection Vol. 2 arcade machine in the Musée Mécanique

Pac-Man Arrangement was ported to the Game Boy Advance as part of Pac-Man Collection.

Pac-Man Arrangement and Dig Dug Arrangement, alongside Galaga Arrangement were also included in the North American exclusive Namco Museum for PlayStation 2, Xbox, and GameCube (the compilation mentioned is not to be confused with Namco Museum 50th Anniversary, which had no "Arrangement" games).

Although Pac-Man Arrangement is not seen in Pac-Man Museum (as the 2005 version of the game from Namco Museum Battle Collection is present), a remix of the World 1 theme from the game is present when entering the Pac-Room area of the game after completing several achievements.

Pac-Man Arrangement (which is labelled as Pac-Man Arrangement Arcade Ver. to distinguish itself from the 2005 game) is included in Pac-Man Museum+ as an unlockable title, which was released in May 2022.

== Reception ==
Edge magazine praised the games for being addictive and fun to play, as well as the remastered arcade versions for being faithful to the arcade originals. Edge particularly commended Dig Dug and Dig Dug Arrangement for being entertaining and one to "complete the trio in fine style". Japanese publication Game Machine expressed interest in the game for bringing older arcade games into modern-day amusement centers, and particularly liked the gameplay of Rally-X Arrangement. Game Machine listed it as being the fifth most popular arcade game of May 1996.

In their review of Pac-Man Collection, Allgame said that Pac-Man Arrangement alone made the package worth the price for its fun gameplay and presentation. Retrospectively, Hardcore Gaming 101 liked Pac-Man Arrangement for being a good update to the original, one that expanded on the concept of the original with ideas such as Kinky and power-up items.
