= Blast Off (video game) =

1989 video game

- Developer: Namco
- Publisher: Namco
- Platforms: Arcade, Mobile phone
- Release: JP: March 1989
- Genre: Scrolling shooter
- Modes: Single-player, multiplayer
- Arcade system: Namco System 1

Blast Off (Note: Japanese: ブラストオフ, Hepburn: Burasuto Ofu) is a 1989 vertically scrolling shooter video game developed and published by Namco for arcades. It was released only in Japan in March 1989. It is the sequel to Bosconian which was released eight years prior. In 2006, it was released for Japanese mobile phones through Namco Bandai Games' mobile game service. Hamster Corporation released the game outside Japan for the first time as part of their Arcade Archives series for the Nintendo Switch and PlayStation 4 in September 2024.

== Gameplay ==
As in many other vertical scrolling shooters (including Namco's own Xevious), the player controls a ship, facing the top of the screen, that can move freely while the background scrolls down, bringing enemies into view; the player may destroy enemies for points. The game uses two buttons - one is used to make the ship fire circular lasers, while the other is used to cycle through its four firing patterns. The four attack patterns include two lasers in a spiral pattern, one laser straight ahead and one behind, one laser straight ahead, one left, and one right, and two lasers diagonally forward (one to the left and one to the right), and one straight behind; by holding down the button, the ship fires more powerful, spherical lasers.

Even though the game is the sequel to Bosconian (which used a synthesized, DAC-generated voice saying "Blast off!" at the beginning of every round), Blast Off had more in common gameplay-wise with Namco's own Dragon Spirit than with Bosconian; this is especially noticeable in the third area of every world, where the player's ship undergoes an increase in size, and must destroy a boss. Despite several gameplay differences, the connection with Bosconian was emphasized in the marketing of the game, with the hexagonal space stations from Bosconian appearing in Namco's press literature, and on the game's title screen, and also making appearances in the game itself - and the game is also worth noting for its usages of various Engrish phrases, such as "To push start only 1 player button" (on title screen), "Go next" (at end of world), "Congraturations" (at end of game) and "Entry your name" (on high score table). There are a total of six worlds in this game, and each one has three areas (so there are a total of eighteen "stages" to play through).

== Reception ==
In Japan, Game Machine listed Blast Off on their April 15, 1989 issue as being the fourth most-successful table arcade game of the year.
