= Bassmasters 2000 =

1999 video game

Bass Masters 2000
- Developer: Mass Media
- Publisher: THQ
- Designer: Bernard Whang
- Programmer: Ian Sabine
- Artist: Scott Sava
- Composer: Tommy Tallarico
- Platform: Nintendo 64
- Release: NA: December 16, 1999
- Genre: Fishing game
- Modes: Single player, multiplayer

Bass Masters 2000 is a bass fishing video game released for the Nintendo 64 in 1999. It was developed by Mass Media and published by THQ.

A screenshot of Bass Masters 2000 gameplay on Nintendo 64

== Reception ==
Reception

Aggregate score
Aggregator	Score
GameRankings	63%

Review scores
Publication	Score
AllGame	3/5
Game Informer	8/10
GameFan	75%
GamePro	2.5/5
GameSpot	7.9/10
IGN	3.1/10
Nintendo Power	7.1/10

The game received "mixed" reviews according to the review aggregation website GameRankings.
