= Bosconian =

1981 video game

- Japanese arcade flyer
- Developer: Namco
- Publishers: JP/EU: Namco; NA: Midway Manufacturing
- Designers: Seiichi Sato; Shigeru Yokoyama
- Programmer: Kazuo Kurosu
- Composer: Nobuyuki Ohnogi
- Series: Bosconian
- Platforms: Arcade, Sord M5, MSX, X68000, Sharp X1, mobile phone, Amstrad CPC, Commodore 64, ZX Spectrum
- Release: Arcade: JP: November 20, 1981; NA: February 1982; X68000: JP: December 1988
- Genre: Multidirectional shooter
- Modes: Single-player, multiplayer
- Arcade system: Namco Galaga

Bosconian (Note: Japanese: ボスコニアン, Hepburn: Bosukonian) is a 1981 multidirectional shooter video game developed and published by Namco for arcades. It was released by Midway Manufacturing in North America. The goal is to earn as many points as possible by destroying enemy missiles and bases using a ship which shoots simultaneously both the front and back.

Bosconian was commercially successful in Japan and received positive critical reception, but did not achieve the global commercial success of other shoot 'em ups from the golden age of arcade video games. It was ported to home computers as Bosconian '87 (1987) and spawned two sequels: Blast Off (1989) and Final Blaster (1990). Since its release, Bosconian has been regarded by critics as influential in the shoot 'em up genre.

== Gameplay ==
A damaged enemy base (green) and another mid-explosion.

The objective of Bosconian is to score as many points as possible by destroying enemy missiles and bases. The player controls the Starfighter, a ship that can move in 8 directions and fires both forward and backward simultaneously. Throughout the game, the Starfighter stays affixed to the center of the screen as it moves. During each round, several green enemy bases — known as "base stars", or "Bosco bases" — appear, all of which must be destroyed in order to advance to the next round. The number of Bosco bases increases with each round. Each Bosco base has 6 globe-like cannons arranged in a hexagon around a central core. To destroy a Bosco base, the player must either shoot the core or destroy all 6 cannons, the latter of which gives the player extra points. In later levels, cores begin defending themselves by opening and closing while launching missiles. A radar display on the right-hand side of the screen shows where enemies are located relative to the player. The game also features a color-coded alert system with voice commands.

Additionally, the player must avoid or destroy stationary asteroids, mines, and a variety of enemy missiles and ships which attempt to collide with his or her ship. Bosco bases will also occasionally launch a squadron of ships in formation attacks — destroying the leader causes all remaining enemies to disperse, but destroying all enemies in a formation scores extra bonus points. A spy ship will also appear occasionally, which must be destroyed or the game's alert system will turn to red regardless of how long the player has taken. Throughout the game, a digitized voice alerts the player to various events, such as incoming enemies or an approaching spy ship.

== Plot ==
The game takes place after the fictional Rock War, an intergalactic conflict between mankind and aliens which ended with the aliens destroying (nearly) all of Earth's cities with missile-firing space stations, known as "Orbitals", and enslaving all (surviving) humans. In an attempt to fight back against the aliens and regain their independence, humans built a spacecraft known as the Starfighter with the best technology they could find, but only one such vehicle could be built. The game involves the unnamed pilot of the Starfighter defeating the aliens to save Earth.

== Development ==
Designer Seiichi Sato was tasked with coming up with ROM-swappable games using Galaxian, Pac-Man, and Rally-X boards. These all became Galaga, Dig Dug, and Bosconian. Sato originally worked on both this game and Galaga together with Shigeru Yokoyama, but the two gradually began working on just one game each. A woman from Namco's sales department was originally brought on to provide the game's voice lines due to the popularity of female voices in American science fiction. Her takes ended up being scrapped in favor of those by Hideyuki Nakajima, the president of Namco America at the time.

== Reception ==
Reception

Review scores
Publication	Score
AllGame	4/5
Computer Gamer	Positive
Electronic Games	Positive
Video Games Magazine	Positive

Award
Publication	Award
Arcade Awards	Best Science Fiction/Fantasy Coin-Op Game

In Japan, Bosconian was the seventh highest-grossing arcade game of 1981, according to the annual Game Machine chart. Game Machine later listed Bosconian as the 22nd most successful table arcade cabinet of August 1983. However, the game was less successful internationally. Due to the rising popularity of Galaga and a shortage of arcade cabinets for the game, many of the Bosconian cabinets that were not selling were converted into Galaga cabinets.

Upon release, Bosconian received generally positive reviews. Video Games Magazine referred to the game as a "treat for Galaxian fans" and opining that, while it did not "break ground insofar as graphics, sounds, weaponry, and antagonists are concerned", it had "a terrific eight-way joystick that has great maneuverability". Electronic Games called it "a real space-gamer's delight", highly praising its 360-degree movement and the ship's simultaneous front-rear fire, which they noted made it the first game to feature either element, as well as its graphics, gameplay, and other mechanics.

Mike Roberts and Steve Phipps of Computer Gamer reviewed the arcade game several years after its release in 1985, stating it was "good value" and still "enjoyable" to play. In a retrospective 1998 review of the game, Brett Alan Weiss of Allgame wrote that the game's front-rear firing system, radar display, and alert system "help[ed] make the game a cut above the average shooter of the era".

In another retrospective review in 2018 of the Sharp X68000 version of the game, Akiba PC Hotline! praised the conversion's accurate portrayal of the arcade original and the "wonderful" rearranged soundtrack. Beep! criticized the Sord M5 version of the game for its poor quality, low difficulty level, and the lack of features from the arcade original, such as the voice samples.

=== Accolades ===
Bosconian won the 1983 Arcade Award for "Best Science Fiction/Fantasy Coin-Op Game", beating both Atari's Gravitar and Sega's Zaxxon.

In 1998, Japanese publication Gamest selected Bosconian as one of the best arcade games of the era, complementing its Rally-X-like radar system, atmosphere and addictive nature. They have cited it as being an influential shooter for its vast game world and setting, labeling it as "an excellent introductory game" for players new to the genre.

== Sequels ==
Bosconian '87, a home computer port of Bosconian, was created by Binary Design and released for several systems, including the Amstrad CPC, ZX Spectrum and Commodore 64 in 1987. In 2003, PC Zone called Bosconian '87 a "spiffing little game", praising the game's soundtrack on the Spectrum 128. Sinclair User's Tamara Howard gave the port seven out of ten stars.

A sequel to Bosconian, Blast Off, was released in 1989 in Japan. A second sequel, Final Blaster, was released in 1990 for the PC Engine, also in Japan.

Bosconian, Blast Off, and Final Blaster were retroactively added to the UGSF timeline shared with Galaxian and other Namco arcade titles.

== Legacy ==
Bosconian has been considered influential for other multidirectional shooters, and has been called "a granddaddy of the multidirectional shooter" by Retro Gamer. Bosconian served as the main inspiration for the 1983 game Sinistar and as an inspiration for the 1982 game Time Pilot.

Bosconian later appeared in several Namco Museum compilations for PlayStation and other consoles, including Namco Museum Vol. 1 for the PlayStation in 1995, Namco Museum Battle Collection for the PlayStation Portable in 2005, Namco Museum 50th Anniversary for the PlayStation 2, GameCube, Xbox and Microsoft Windows later that year, Namco Museum Virtual Arcade for the Xbox 360 in 2008, the Wii's Virtual Console in 2009, as well as Namco Museum Megamix for the Wii in 2010. The game has also been released as part of Jakks Pacific's TV game controllers. Hamster Corporation re-released the arcade version as part of their Arcade Archives series for the Nintendo Switch and PlayStation 4 in August 2023.

Among the games based on Bosconian was Draconian, a multidirectional shooter for TRS-80 Color Computer written by Mike Hughey and published via Tom Mix Software in 1984, then converted to the Dragon 32/64.
