= Namco Museum Vol. 2 =

1996 video game compilation

Namco Museum Volume 2
- North American box art
- Developer: Namco Hometek
- Publishers: Namco: NA: Namco Hometek; EU: Sony Computer Entertainment
- Series: Namco Museum
- Platform: PlayStation
- Release: JP: February 9, 1996; NA: October 25, 1996; EU: November 1996
- Genre: Various
- Modes: Single-player, multiplayer

Namco Museum Vol. 2 is a video game compilation developed and published by Namco for the PlayStation in 1996.

== Gameplay ==
Namco Museum Vol. 2 includes the original Namco arcade hits Super Pac-Man (non-Japanese versions only), Gaplus, Xevious, Mappy, Grobda, and Dragon Buster. The Japanese version also includes Cutie Q and Bomb Bee, which are not included in the international versions.

== Reception ==
Next Generation reviewed the PlayStation version of the game, rating it two stars out of five, and stated that "Only the most die-hard classic game collectors will want this disc, and they'll only want half of it. Namco should more closely consider the future line-up in its classic series."

== Reviews ==
- All Game Guide - 1998
- Electronic Gaming Monthly - Nov, 1996
- GameSpot - Dec 13, 1996
- NowGamer - Nov 01, 1996
- IGN - Nov 25, 1996
