= Mass Media (company) =

American video game developer

Mass Media, Inc.
- Formerly: Phillips P.O.V. Entertainment Group (1991-1995)
- Type: Subsidiary
- Industry: Video games
- Founded: 1991; 35 years ago
- Headquarters: Moorpark, California, U.S.
- Parent: THQ (2007–2008); 2K (2018–present)
- Website: massmedia.com

Mass Media, Inc. is an American video game developer based in Moorpark, California formed by David Riordan and David Todd.

== History ==
Mass Media began in the 1980s at Cinemaware when David Riordan and David Todd worked at the company. In 1991, as Cinemaware was going bankrupt, they formed a production unit at Philips Interactive Media, called Philips P.O.V. Entertainment Group. The company made its big break with Voyeur, a successful interactive movie game that was a huge hit for CD-i and earned critical acclaim.

In 1995, the company was reorganized, becoming more independent and renamed as Mass Media during the production of Thunder in Paradise Interactive. Mass Media soon left Philips in 1995 and the company became an exclusive developer for Time Warner Interactive after David Riordan left Philips for Time Warner.

After Time Warner halted their interactive division and was sold to Midway Games, Mass Media became an independent developer. Mass Media's first game as an independent developer was developing The Game of Life for Hasbro Interactive, which was released in 1998 in association with developer The Collective. The company expanded by luring away staff from the former ashes of the game developer V.R.T.O. (another company formed by ex-Cinemaware alumunus).

In late 1998, the company expanded to work for the Nintendo 64 platform, while the company first met THQ to develop a Bass Masters game for Nintendo 64, and in 2001, supported the Game Boy Advance platform. The company was also an early supporter of Nintendo GameCube's development tools.

In 2003, the company worked with Blizzard Entertainment for porting classic games to Game Boy Advance for development of titles under the Classic Arcade label. The company also developed a party game engine, which was used for Muppets Party Cruise and Shrek: Super Party.

It was acquired by THQ in February 2007 who closed the studio in November 2008. The company started back up immediately, focusing on developing for the Sony platforms, including the PlayStation 3. On the PlayStation 3, they developed content and spaces for its social gaming network PlayStation Home including the games The Midway, The Midway 2, and The Midway 3 which were three game spaces with ten mini-games in each with ten rewards per mini-game. The Green Ticket, used to play the games in the three Midways, was consistently the best selling item in PS Home.

Mass Media has also continued to develop game engine technology for PlayStation 3 and other platforms. Notably this includes one of the first non-Sony PlayStation 3 implementations of fully SPU based GPU rendering command generation, significantly reducing rendering overhead on the main CPU (used in Saints Row 2 and subsequent PS3 titles). In 2018, Mass Media was acquired by 2K.

== Games ==
Mass Media has developed over forty titles and currently has additional titles in various stages of development. All of their titles were developed with their development tool set called BOLT.

Year	Title	Platform(s)
1992	Defender of the Crown	CD-i
1992	Girl's Club	CD-i
1992	Lords of the Rising Sun	CD-i
1992	Mystic Midway: Rest in Pieces	CD-i
1992	Tetris	CD-i
1992	Zombie Dinos from Planet Zeltoid	CD-i
1993	Caesars World of Boxing	CD-i
1993	Mystic Midway: Phantom Express	CD-i, MS-DOS
1993	Voyeur	CD-i
1994	Mystic Midway: Rest in Pieces	MS-DOS
1994	NFL Hall of Fame Football	CD-i
1994	Voyeur	MS-DOS
1995	Thunder in Paradise Interactive	CD-i, MS-DOS
1996	3-D TableSports	MS-DOS
1998	The Game of Life	Windows, PlayStation
1999	BassMasters 2000	Nintendo 64
1999	Namco Museum 64	Nintendo 64
2000	Ms. Pac-Man Maze Madness	Dreamcast, Nintendo 64
2000	Namco Museum	Dreamcast
2000	Saban's Power Rangers: Lightspeed Rescue	Nintendo 64
2000	StarCraft 64	Nintendo 64
2001	Namco Museum	Game Boy Advance, PlayStation 2
2001	Pac-Man Collection	Game Boy Advance
2002	Namco Museum	GameCube, Xbox
2002	Pac-Man Fever	GameCube, PlayStation 2
2002	Shrek: Super Party	PlayStation 2, Xbox
2002	The Simpsons Skateboarding	PlayStation 2
2003	Blackthorne	Game Boy Advance
2003	Jim Henson's Muppets Party Cruise	GameCube, PlayStation 2
2003	Rock n' Roll Racing	Game Boy Advance
2003	Shrek: Super Party	GameCube
2003	The Lost Vikings	Game Boy Advance
2004	Nicktoons Movin'	PlayStation 2
2005	Full Spectrum Warrior	PlayStation 2
2005	The Bible Game	PlayStation 2, Xbox
2006	Full Spectrum Warrior: Ten Hammers	PlayStation 2
2007	Tetris Evolution	Xbox 360
2008	Saints Row 2	PlayStation 3, Xbox 360
2009	Marvel Super Hero Squad	PlayStation 2, PlayStation Portable
2009	Saints Row 2	Windows
2010	Darksiders	Windows, PlayStation 3, Xbox 360
2010	The Midway	PlayStation Home
2010	The Midway 2	PlayStation Home
2011	Warhammer 40,000: Space Marine	Windows, PlayStation 3, Xbox 360
2012	Jak and Daxter Collection	PlayStation 3
2012	The Midway 3	PlayStation Home
2013	Jak and Daxter Collection	PlayStation Vita
2014	Ratchet & Clank Collection	PlayStation Vita
2015	Evolve	Windows, PlayStation 4, Xbox One
2016	Mafia III	Windows, PlayStation 4, Xbox One
2017	XCOM 2: War of the Chosen	PlayStation 4, Xbox One
2018	Carnival Games	Windows, Switch, PlayStation 4, Xbox One
2022	New Tales from the Borderlands	Switch
