= Pac-Man Vs. =

2003 video game

- North American cover art
- Developer: Nintendo EAD
- Publishers: JP: Namco; NA: Namco Hometek; EU: Electronic Arts
- Designer: Shigeru Miyamoto
- Series: Pac-Man
- Platforms: GameCube, Nintendo DS, Nintendo Switch
- Release: JP: November 27, 2003; NA: December 2, 2003; PAL: April 2, 2004
- Genres: Maze
- Mode: Multiplayer

Pac-Man Vs. (Note: Japanese: パックマンvs., Hepburn: Pakkuman Buiesu) is a 2003 maze video game developed by Nintendo and published by Namco for the GameCube. In the game, one player takes control of Pac-Man, who must eat all of the pellets in the maze, while the others control the ghosts to try to catch them. The objective is to be the first to reach a set number of points, selected before the game begins. The player controlling Pac-Man uses the Game Boy Advance to play, while the others use the television to control the ghosts. The game requires the GameCube - Game Boy Advance link cable in order to play.

Pac-Man Vs. was designed by Shigeru Miyamoto and Nintendo EAD, created as a tech demo to show off the capabilities of the GCN link cable. First shown at the Games Convention in Germany, under the working title Pac-Man for Nintendo GameCube, it was then presented to Namco, who took interest and agreed to publish it as a full game. Pac-Man Vs. was met with generally favorable reviews from critics, who praised its interesting concept, multiplayer and addictive gameplay. Criticism was directed towards its small amount of content and lack of memory card support. It was ported to the Nintendo DS through Namco Museum DS (2007) and the Nintendo Switch through Namco Museum (2017).

== Gameplay ==
Screenshot of the game from the television, showing the ghosts fleeing from Pac-Man

Pac-Man Vs. is a maze video game. The game requires a Game Boy Advance, the GameCube - Game Boy Advance link cable peripheral, and one to three GameCube controllers to play. Before the game begins, a predetermined score value can be set to either 7,000, 10,000 or 15,000 points; the first player to reach this score wins. One of the players will be assigned as Pac-Man, the others being the ghosts. The player controlling Pac-Man uses the Game Boy Advance to play, the objective being to eat all the dots in the maze without being caught by a ghost. Eating large flashing "Power Pellets" will cause the ghosts to turn blue, allowing Pac-Man to eat them to steal points and send them back to the regeneration box in the middle of the maze. If a ghost catches Pac-Man, the person that caught him will become Pac-Man in the next round. Eating a certain amount of pellets will cause a fruit to appear underneath the regeneration box, which Pac-Man or the ghosts can eat for bonus points.

The remaining players will take control of the ghosts on the television screen, who must catch Pac-Man before he eats all of the pellets in the maze. If Pac-Man consumes a Power Pellet, the ghosts will turn blue and become slower, and must avoid contact with Pac-Man. The ghosts have a limited field of vision, which can be increased for a limited period of time by eating fruit that appears in the middle of the stage. If there are fewer than four players in the game, uncontrolled ghosts will start as gray-colored CPUs that are harmless to Pac-Man — however, a human-controlled ghost can touch it to tag it with his or her color, which can kill Pac-Man and count towards that player's score.

Pac-Man can earn points by eating pellets, vulnerable ghosts and fruit, while ghosts can earn them by eating fruit and catching Pac-Man. Should Pac-Man clear the stage of pellets, the person controlling him will earn 1,600 point bonus and will continue to play as him in the next stage, however Pac-Man will also lose that same amount to a ghost who catches him. Mario (voiced by Charles Martinet) appears as an announcer and will commentate on the game, such as when Pac-Man eats a Power Pellet or when a fruit appears in the stage. Six different mazes can be selected, each having different layouts and music.

== Development ==
Pac-Man Vs. was designed by Shigeru Miyamoto and Nintendo Entertainment Analysis & Development (EAD) for the GameCube. A fan of the original Pac-Man arcade game, Miyamoto designed a tech demo to show off the capabilities of the GameCube - Game Boy Advance link cable peripheral, where one player controlled Pac-Man and three others controlled the ghosts. A short demo was shown off at the Games Convention in Germany, simply titled Pac-Man for Nintendo GameCube, where it gained a sizable amount of attention. The game took a month to complete, where it was then shown to Namco, who took interest and agreed to publish it as a full game. It was presented at the 2003 Electronic Entertainment Expo (E3), with Pac-Man creator Toru Iwatani invited to the presentation as a guest.

== Release ==
The game was first released in Japan on November 27, 2003, in North America on December 2, 2003, and in PAL regions on April 2, 2004. In Japan, the game came bundled with the GameCube version of R: Racing Evolution or for Club Nintendo members who registered one of six selected Nintendo or Namco titles on the service before the end of the year. In North America, the game was bundled with the Player's Choice re-release of Pac-Man World 2 and R: Racing Evolution, or as a stand-alone title with purchases or pre-orders of I-Ninja. In Europe, the game was also bundled with R: Racing, with Namco Europe's co-publisher Electronic Arts announcing this in February 2004.

A remake of the game was released for the Nintendo DS in 2007 as part of Namco Museum DS, using the system's Download Play function for multiplayer. A version for mobile phones was also released that utilized Bluetooth for multiplayer. A high-definition remake of the GameCube version was released in 2017 for the Nintendo Switch Namco Museum compilation, requiring two systems to play (one must have the full game while the other must also own either the full game or a free Pac Man VS download app). A single-console mode is also included, where players controlled the ghosts to catch a computer-controlled Pac-Man. The multiplayer aspect of the original GameCube release was re-used for the online battle mode in The Legend of Zelda: Phantom Hourglass (2007).

== Reception ==
Reception

Aggregate score
Aggregator	Score
Metacritic	78/100

Review scores
Publication	Score
GamePro	4/5
IGN	8/10
Nintendo World Report	8/10
Nintendojo	7/10

Pac-Man Vs. was met with generally favorable reviews from critics, who praised its clever take on the core gameplay, multiplayer and replay value. It holds a 78/100 on Metacritic.

Nintendo World Report called it "a must-have for parties", while GamePro said it was worth owning for its "posterity" alone. IGN, GamePro and Nintendojo praised the game's interesting take on the Pac-Man gameplay, with IGN in particular noting that it is "intuitive for anyone regardless of their gaming skill levels". Nintendo World Report highly praised the game's multiplayer aspect for keeping the gameplay frantic and fast-paced. A similar response was echoed by IGN, who called it "incredibly fun" and said it added to the overall experience. In their review for Namco Museum DS, Retro Gamer magazine said the package was worth it for Pac-Man Vs. alone, praising its addictive gameplay and multiplayer focus. Polygon called it one of the best Pac-Man games.

Despite its praise, the game was criticized for its small amount of content and lack of memory card support. Nintendojo criticized the game's lack of depth and for not being able to save high scores to a memory card. Nintendo World Report had a similar response, also criticizing its limited availability to consumers. While IGN and GamePro found the commentary from Mario to be annoying, Nintendojo said that it was helpful for when something happens outside the player's vision, although commented that it was largely unnecessary. GamePro disliked Pac-Man's slow movement and controls. Several critics would argue that the game being a free extra dismissed much of its criticism, with Nintendo World Report even saying that there is "not much reason to be disappointed with a lack of features".
