= Dragon Spirit: The New Legend =

1989 video game

- North American cover art
- Developer: Now Production
- Publishers: JP: Namco; NA: Bandai
- Composer: Masakatsu Maekawa
- Series: Dragon Spirit
- Platform: Nintendo Entertainment System
- Release: JP: April 14, 1989; NA: June 1990
- Genre: Scrolling shooter
- Mode: Single-player

Dragon Spirit: The New Legend (Note: Japanese: ドラゴンスピリット 新たなる伝説, Hepburn: Doragon Supiritto: Aratanaru Densetsu) is a 1989 vertically scrolling shooter video game developed by Now Production and published by Namco for the Nintendo Entertainment System. It is a sequel and remixed port of the 1987 arcade game Dragon Spirit.

== Gameplay ==
The two headed dragon is fighting the final battle against the evil monster of the abyss.

In Dragon Spirit: The New Legend, players controls a dragon that must use fireballs to destroy various enemies in a vertical shooter similar to 1942, 1943, and Tiger-Heli.

There are two different kinds of games: the golden dragon game (easy difficulty level) or the blue dragon game (normal difficulty level). A story is told between levels as the player progresses.

The "easy mode" that becomes available if the player dies during the opening level offers a very different gameplay experience from the standard mode.

Major differences in gameplay aside from the color of the dragon include differentiation in powers. The gold dragon is much faster by default, both in movement and attack speed. Additionally, power-up transformations are far more destructive and effective, often wiping out most enemies in a single strike, and sweeping across the entire screen, in some cases leaving no enemy alive.

In addition to enhanced powers and speed, many of the more difficult levels are removed from this mode, shortening the total game and story. The golden dragon also takes more damage and will face slightly different enemies and bosses. The story for Prince Lace is very different from that of King Amru's tale should the player successfully activate the standard difficulty game.

Players have 360° control within the screen, with most enemies appearing at the top. Players can attack enemies on-screen damages (and ultimately kills) the main character. Players have two kinds of attacks; shoot directly in the air with fire or bomb the ground with bombs. There are nine worlds in the game, ranging from the Paleozoic Era to a parallel universe known only as the Evil Palace, where the final boss awaits the player in his lair.

== Plot ==
Peace has reigned over the kingdom of Olympis for years, thanks to King Amul's (Amru in the English translation) heroic battle against the demon Zawel. After Amul married Aricia, they had two children, Princess Iris and Prince Lace. The evil Galda was building an army of evil and used his black magic to resurrect Zawel from the dead. Galda has decided to attack the Earth. Amru's son Prince Lace wakes suddenly from a nightmare, wherein his father Amru is killed when fighting Zawel, which is not how that event transpired (i.e., the player's failure to complete the first level). He is then confronted by the sorcerer Galda who declares that he is taking Lace's sister, Princess Iris, to be his prisoner. Lace takes up his father's sword to rescue his kidnapped sister from the demon Galda. Instead of transforming into a blue dragon-like his father, Lace becomes a gold dragon.
