= Dragon Spirit =

1987 video game

- Japanese arcade flyer
- Developer: Namco
- Publishers: JP: Namco; NA: Atari Games
- Designer: Tatsuya Ishikawa
- Composer: Shinji Hosoe
- Platforms: Arcade, X68000, TurboGrafx-16, Amiga, Atari ST, MS-DOS, Amstrad CPC, Commodore 64, ZX Spectrum
- Release: May 15, 1987: Arcade; JP: May 15, 1987; NA: July 1987; EU: August 1987 TurboGrafx-16; JP: December 16, 1988; NA: November 1989 Amiga, Atari ST, MS-DOS; EU: September 1989 C64, CPC, ZX Spectrum; EU: 1989
- Genre: Scrolling shooter
- Modes: Single-player, multiplayer
- Arcade system: Namco System 1

Dragon Spirit (Note: Japanese: ドラゴンスピリット, Hepburn: Doragon Supiritto) is a 1987 vertically scrolling shooter video game developed and published by Namco for arcades. It was released by Atari Games in North America. Controlling the dragon Amur, the player must complete each of the game's nine areas to rescue Princess Alicia from the demon Zawell. Similar to Namco's own Xevious, Amur has a projectile weapon for destroying air-based enemies and a bomb for destroying ground enemies. It ran on the Namco System 1 arcade board.

Music for the game was composed by Shinji Hosoe and designed by Tatsuya Ishikawa. Hosoe, previously a graphics artist for Namco, was allowed to work on the music himself due to most of the company's composers working on Genpei Tōma Den. However, much of his work was accidentally wiped from the hardware midway through development, forcing him to start over. Ishikawa previously created character artwork for Rolling Thunder, being assigned to the project after taking an interest in the enemy designs. The game was dedicated to Shouichi Fukatani, a Namco programmer who had died a few years earlier in 1985 and worked on many of the company's older games, such as Dig Dug and Super Pac-Man.

The game was ported to several home systems, including the X68000, TurboGrafx-16 and Atari ST, and is included in various Namco compilations. The arcade version of Dragon Spirit was met with positive reviews from critics for standing out amongst other shooter games, being praised for its Paleozoic setting, graphics and soundtrack. Home versions were met with a more mixed reception, being criticized for its high difficulty and inferior graphics and music. It was followed by two sequels, Dragon Spirit: The New Legend (1988) and Dragon Saber (1990). A ShiftyLook webcomic adaptation of the game was also produced.

== Gameplay ==
Arcade version screenshot

Dragon Spirit is a vertically scrolling shooter where the player controls the dragon Amur in his effort to rescue Princess Alicia from the serpent demon Zawell. Amur can move in eight directions and has access to two weapons; a flame projectile to destroy air-based enemies, and a bomb to destroy ground-stationed enemies, similar to Namco's Xevious. Amur can take two hits before dying, indicated by a life bar at the bottom-left of the screen. He can use bombs to destroy eggs found on the ground of some stages, which will award one of two powerup items; a blue orb that will give Amur an extra head, granting him additional firepower, or an orange orb that will strengthen Amur's shots when three are collected.

The game has nine stages, which include large rivers, volcanoes, glaciers and jungles. Dying halfway through a stage will start the player at a checkpoint. At the end of each stage is a boss that Amur must fight in order to progress to the next stage. Amur can sometimes find special orbs throughout the game that can grant him additional abilities, such as a homing shot, a multi-shot, and the power to shrink down in size to evade bullets. The game's opening cutscene shows Amur atop a mountain raising his sword in the air, with lightning striking it and transforming him into his dragon form. If the player makes it to the end of the ninth level and defeats Zawell, Princess Alicia will be seen in captivity behind glass, which shatters as she yells "Amur!". The dragon then retransforms into human form and embraces Alicia, and an end scene is shown where the people of the kingdom are celebrating peace and prosperity now that Zawell's reign of terror is over.

== Development and release ==
Dragon Spirit was released in Japan by Namco on May 15, 1987, later licensed to Atari Games for release in North America. The game's music was composed by Shinji Hosoe, originally a graphic designer for the company. After asking Wonder Momo composer "Yudate" how to add music to the game code, he inserted many of his tracks during his own time — once the development team behind the game found out, he was automatically assigned as the game's composer. During its development, Namco was low on composers as many of them went to work on Genpei Tōma Den, allowing Hosoe to be able to compose the music himself.

Graphics were created by Tatsuya Ishikawa, who had previously produced character artwork for Rolling Thunder — after taking interest in the game's enemy designs, the team assigned him as the lead artist. Ishikawa listened to Hosoe's music when he was low on ideas for enemy or background designs. Hosoe's music was accidentally wiped from the hardware around midway through the development process, forcing him to start over. After the first set of arcade boards were released, Hosoe remade the game's music in hopes it could be reused for a re-issue of the hardware, but his idea was scrapped by Namco due to high production costs.

In North America and Europe, Dragon Spirit was ported to several home consoles and computers, including the Atari ST, Commodore 64, Amiga, ZX Spectrum and Amstrad CPC. In Japan, Namco ported the game to the X68000 and PC Engine, the latter being published in North America by NEC for the TurboGrafx-16. Dragon Spirit is included in several Namco video game compilations, such as Namco Museum Vol. 5 (1997), Namco Museum 50th Anniversary (2005), Namco Museum Virtual Arcade (2008) and Namco Museum Essentials (2009). The TurboGrafx-16 conversion was digitally re-released onto the Wii's Virtual Console in 2007, while the arcade version was released in 2009 exclusively in Japan. A version for Japanese mobile phones was released in 2003. An arcade version of Dragon Spirit was released by Hamster Corporation under the Arcade Archives label for the Nintendo Switch and PlayStation 4 in 2022.

== Reception ==
Reception

Review scores
Publication	Score
AllGame	3.5/5 (ARC)
Computer and Video Games	Positive (ARC); 94% (PCE)
Eurogamer	6/10 (TG-16)
Famitsu	32/40 (PCE)
IGN	7/10 (TG-16)
Nintendo Life	6/10 (TG-16)
Power Play	73% (ARC)

Awards
Publication	Award
Gamest	Grand Prize (5th); Best Ending (2nd); Player Popularity (5th)
Famitsu	Gold Hall of Fame

In Japan, Game Machine listed Dragon Spirit as the sixth most successful table arcade unit of July 1987. It went on to be the fourth highest-grossing table arcade game of 1987 in Japan.

Dragon Spirit was met with a positive response from critics, who praised its graphics, music and Paleozoic setting, and for standing out among other similar games during the time. Allgame praised its "gorgeous graphics" and soundtrack, and for being unique compared to other games of its genre, while German magazine Power Play praised its interesting gameplay mechanics, notably the double-head powerup, and for its captivating gameplay. Computer & Video Games praised the game's addictive gameplay and soundtrack, saying it lives up to games such as Galaxian and Galaga. Japanese publication Gamest called it a "Namco shooting masterpiece" for its graphics, realism and soundtrack, awarding it the 5th "Grand Prize", 2nd "Best Ending" and 5th "Player Popularity" awards in 1998. In a retrospective review, Hardcore Gaming 101 praised the game's graphics, challenging gameplay and iconic opening cutscene.

Reviewing the TurboGrafx-16 conversion, IGN praised the game's vibrant graphics, unique setting and challenge, recommending the title to fans of Xevious and other similar vertical-scrolling shooters, while Eurogamer liked its lack of a one-hit player kill and colorful visuals. Nintendo Life was the most critical of the conversion, disliking its sudden difficulty spike towards the end and inferior quality compared to the arcade version. They also unfavorably compared it to Super Star Soldier, only recommending it to hardcore fans of the genre. Famitsu awarded the PC Engine port the "Gold Hall of Fame" award for its gameplay and strategy.

== Sequels and legacy ==
A sequel, Dragon Spirit: The New Legend, was released for the Nintendo Entertainment System in 1989 and published outside Japan by Bandai. Taking place several years after the events of the original, it adds many of the levels from the arcade version alongside new stages, enemies, boss fights and cinematic cutscenes, as well as a brand-new storyline. A second sequel, Dragon Saber, was released for arcades in 1990, running on the Namco System 2 arcade board. Subtitled After Story of Dragon Spirit, this game adds two-player co-operative play, charging shots and new enemy types. A PC Engine version was released a year later in 1991, while the arcade version was released as part of the Japan-only Namco Museum Encore compilation. The PC Engine conversion was released for the Japanese Wii Virtual Console in 2008, followed by the arcade version in 2009.

Amur appears as a playable character in the WonderSwan Color game Namco Super Wars, alongside Princess Alicia. Several players in the Family Stadium series would be named after Amur and the game itself. In 2012, a webcomic adaptation of Dragon Spirit was created for ShiftyLook a subsidiary of Namco Bandai Games that focused on reviving older Namco game franchises for use in comics and animations. Illustrated by artist Steve Cummings, the comic was a tongue-in-cheek parody of the "damsel in distress" storyline used in fiction, with characters and settings taken from the arcade game. Nidia, a character from the webcomic, appeared as someone the player could date in the now-defunct browser game Namco High. An arrangement of the Area 1 music from the game is available as a track in Super Smash Bros. Ultimate for use on the Pac-Land stage.
