= Aero-Cross =

Unreleased platform game

- Game logo
- Developer(s): Namco Bandai Games
- Publisher(s): Namco Bandai Games
- Series: Metro-Cross
- Platform(s): Xbox 360, PlayStation 3
- Release: Cancelled
- Genre(s): Platform
- Mode(s): Single-player, multiplayer

Aero-Cross (Note: Japanese: エアロクロス, Hepburn: Earo Kurosu) is an unreleased platform video game that was in development for the PlayStation 3 and Xbox 360 by Namco Bandai Games. It was intended as a modernized sequel to the arcade game Metro-Cross, and the third released under the Namco Generations series of video game remakes. Players control a runner through each level in an effort to get to the end stage goal before the timer runs out. Levels feature hazards that must be overcome, and there are also power-ups that grant player with different abilities, such as a speed boost or being able to glide over the level.

Aero-Cross was produced by Hideo Yoshizawa, the creator of Klonoa and Mr. Driller. Yoshizawa liked the original Metro-Cross for having the player try to find the fastest possible route to the goal at the end of each level, and wanted to expand on this concept in Aero-Cross. He also focused on stage hazards, player acceleration, and co-operative play. The game was announced in October 2010 and cancelled in December 2012 following a lack of updates on its production. Compared to the other cancelled Namco Generations game, a reboot of the infamous puzzle game Dancing Eyes, critics felt that Aero-Cross had potential. They praised its gameplay and evolution on the original Metro-Cross gameplay, and showed disappointment in its cancellation.

== Gameplay ==
The player gliding across the level with the hoverboard. The player's score is displayed at the top right, and the timer at the bottom.

Aero-Cross is presented as an arcade-style platform game, with emphasis on speed and acceleration. Players control a runner through each course, with the goal being to reach the end before the timer runs out. The end of each level is indicated by a large circular goalpost, with a map being provided at the bottom that shows how far they have reached. Levels feature different themes, such as futuristic cities, deserts, and factories. In these levels, players will need to overcome different stage hazards that will cause their runner to be temporarily stunned and their timer to deplete further. Hazards include giant steel cylinders, tiles that slow down the player if touched, walls that emerge from the ground, and computer-controlled opponents. There are item capsules placed through stages as well, each containing power-ups that grant different abilities. Three items were revealed: a speed boost, a clock that stops time, and a hoverboard that allows players to glide over the level. Running behind opponents creates an effect called a "slipstream", allowing players to run faster than usual. Players can also perform an "air dash" that grants them a temporary boost in speed. Air dashing can also be used to knock opponents off of the map and destroy incoming obstacles.

== History ==
=== Development and promotion ===
Aero-Cross was intended as the third game under the Namco Generations label, a brand created by Namco Bandai Games for use on modernized remakes of their older titles. The first of these was Pac-Man Championship Edition DX, a critically acclaimed follow-up to Pac-Man Championship Edition. Aero-Cross was produced by Hideo Yoshizawa, the creator of Namco's Klonoa and Mr. Driller franchises and the chief producer of the Namco Generations series. It was intended as the sequel to Metro-Cross, a 1985 platform arcade game that was popular in Japan. Yoshizawa appreciated the game for having the player try to find the fastest possible route to the goal at the end of each level, and wanted to expand on this concept in Aero-Cross. He also wanted to focus on co-operative play, player acceleration, and variations in stage hazards. Many of the game's mechanics and concepts were kept secret.

A trademark for the game was filed in Germany and Australia in August, followed by a rating by the Entertainment Software Rating Board. Namco Bandai officially announced Aero-Cross in October 2010, alongside Galaga Legions DX. Due to the obscurity of the original Metro-Cross, and for it being released alongside more recognizable series like Pac-Man and Galaxian, the reveal was met with confusion from publications. The company described it as a "dynamic running action" game, and advertised its speed and acceleration. Namco Bandai also said that it would be published for the PlayStation 3 and Xbox 360 as a digital download.

=== Cancellation ===
As the years progressed, Namco Bandai remained relatively silent towards Aero-Cross and the Namco Generations series itself. This was met with confusion from video game news sites, who were speculating if the game was even in production or not. In December 2012, the company revealed that Aero-Cross was officially cancelled, alongside the indefinite discontinuation of the Namco Generations brand. They cited "various circumstances" as the reason for its cancellation.

Publications showed interest in Aero-Cross. Writing for Engadget, JG Fletcher said that compared to the other cancelled Namco Generations game, a remake of Dancing Eyes (1996), Aero-Cross had potential. Describing it as "a much more sensible update", Fletcher commented on the game's new features and for building upon the original Metro-Cross gameplay in an interesting manner, writing: "I do wish I'd had the opportunity to play that, as I spent a few really happy hours in college working through the arcade original on PlayStation. Unlike Dancing Eyes, I can admit to wanting to play that without ending up on some list". Game Watch's Kenji Saeki and Game*Spark's Rikusyo stated that the game's cancellation was disappointing to hear. Jordan Devore of Destructoid believed that the game would likely never have had that large of an audience, and would have made much more sense as a mobile phone title than a console game. He concluded in his article: "Considering how much we've actually seen of the project (very little), it shouldn't be too heartbreaking to hear that Aero-Cross has been canceled. If I'm being generous, I could maybe see this type of game performing decently on mobile devices, but it was likely never destined to have a huge audience no matter the platform. Bummer, though -- Metro-Cross was great".
