= Beebdroid =

- Starquake running under Beebdroid
- Developer(s): Little Fluffy Toys
- Initial release: October 2011; 13 years ago
- Stable release: 1.3 / 17 February 2012
- Repository: github.com/littlefluffytoys/beebdroid
- Operating system: Android 2.2+
- Type: Microcomputer emulator
- Website: github.com/littlefluffytoys/Beebdroid

Beebdroid is a free software emulator for the BBC Micro, based on B-Em for Linux by Tom Walker. It runs under Android and was developed by Reuben Scratton and Kenton Price and released by Little Fluffy Toys in 2011.

== Features ==
It features a full onscreen keyboard, optimised controls for the Xperia Play smartphone/console, access to games via disk images provided by stairwaytohell.com and caters for saved games.

== Popular titles ==
The Google Analytics service led to publication of a list of popular game titles downloaded by users of the emulator.

14 November 2011

| Rank | Title |
|---|---|
| 1 | Chuckie Egg |
| 2 | Elite |
| 3 | Arcadians |
| 4 | Frak! |
| 5 | Citadel |
| 6 | Castle Quest |
| 7 | Jet Set Willy |
| 8 | Killer Gorilla |
| 9 | Manic Miner |
| 10 | Thrust |

| Rank | Title |
|---|---|
| 11 | Repton |
| 12 | Mr.Ee! |
| 13 | Snapper |
| 14 | Stryker's Run |
| 15 | Super Invaders |
| 16 | Daredevil Dennis |
| 17 | Hopper |
| 18 | Hyper Viper |
| 19 | The Hobbit |
| 20 | Planetoid |
