= Doctor Who and the Mines of Terror =

1985 video game

- Developer: Gary Partis
- Publisher: Micro Power
- Series: Doctor Who
- Platforms: Amstrad CPC, BBC Micro, Commodore 64
- Release: 1985

Doctor Who and the Mines of Terror is a game for the Amstrad CPC, BBC Micro and Commodore 64. It was first released by Micro Power on the BBC Micro in 1985, and on the Amstrad CPC & C64 in 1986.

== Gameplay ==
In-game screenshot (BBC Micro)

The game's play centres on the player's character of the Doctor (specifically his sixth incarnation), and his robotic programmable cat Splinx. The goal of the game is to halt the Master's production of Heatonite, retrieve stolen plans for the Time Lords, and return safely.

The game's screen always has the player in the centre, and depending on the direction of movement, the entire screen scrolls horizontally, vertically, or diagonally. The player can move freely, but can die in many ways: monster attack, robot attack, too great a fall, forced regeneration, lack of oxygen, and sharp spikes.

Enemies include patrolling robots that resemble the Daleks; however, the actual name and exact design of the Daleks was not used due to the rights to them being part owned by Terry Nation, creator of the Daleks.

== Development and release ==
The game began life as a sequel to the hit BBC Micro game Castle Quest, and was adapted into a Doctor Who game mid-development.

As it was too large to fit into the standard memory of the BBC Micro, it came with its own ROM chip which had to be installed for the game to run in conjunction with game's main disk.

== Reception ==
Zzap!64's reviewers noted the game's similarity to Castle Quest. They found that despite average graphics and weak sound, it was an enjoyable release thanks to the entertaining gameplay. It was rated 86% overall.

ASM gave the game 4 out of 10, saying the game was trite.
