= Pac-Man & Galaga Dimensions =

- North American box art
- Developer: Bandai Namco Games
- Publisher: Namco Bandai Games
- Directors: Takahiro Okano; Takahisa Sugiyama
- Series: Pac-Man; Galaxian
- Platform: Nintendo 3DS
- Release: JP: June 23, 2011; NA: July 26, 2011; AU: August 4, 2011; EU: August 26, 2011
- Genre: Video game compilation
- Mode: Single-player

Pac-Man & Galaga Dimensions (Note: Japanese: パックマン&ギャラガ ディメンションズ, Hepburn: Pakku Man & Gyaraga Dimenshonzu) is a 2011 video game compilation developed and published for the Nintendo 3DS by Namco Bandai Games. It contains six games from the company's Pac-Man and Galaxian franchises—Pac-Man (1980), Galaga (1981), Pac-Man Championship Edition (2007), Galaga Legions (2008), Pac-Man Tilt, and Galaga 3D Impact, the last two being unique games created exclusively for this collection. The collection also includes achievements, online leaderboards, and a trailer for the Pac-Man and the Ghostly Adventures television series.

Dimensions was created by Takahiro Okano and Takahisa Sugiyama, who were commissioned by Namco Bandai to produce a compilation as a way to celebrate the 30th anniversaries of Galaga and Pac-Man, and to bridge the two franchises together in a single package. The two exclusive games were built to take advantage of the new features included in the 3DS, which had launched before production began. Pac-Man Championship Edition and Galaga Legions were added due to neither having been released on a portable system beforehand, and for being important entries in their respective series.

Pac-Man & Galaga Dimensions received mixed reviews from critics. Though the emulation quality and the inclusion of Pac-Man Championship Edition and Galaga Legions received praise, reviewers were critical of the compilation's overall quality, the small screen resolution, and its high retail price. While some believed the exclusive games made the package worthwhile, others believed they were of subpar quality and suffered from poor 3D effects and controls.

== Overview ==
Screenshots of the two exclusive games included in Dimensions. Pac-Man Tilt is on the top, and Galaga 3D Impact is on the bottom.

Pac-Man & Galaga Dimensions is a collection of six games from the Pac-Man and Galaxian franchises—Pac-Man (1980), Galaga (1981), Pac-Man Championship Edition (2007), Galaga Legions (2008), Pac-Man Tilt, and Galaga 3D Impact, the last two being exclusive to this collection. Pac-Man and Galaga are both arcade games from the early 1980s, while Pac-Man Championship Edition and Galaga Legions are modernized updates that were first published on the Xbox 360 and PlayStation 3. All of the games except Pac-Man Tilt utilize the system's 3D display. The original ports of Pac-Man and Galaga feature a curved monitor display that replicate the original arcade machines, with the added option to choose from the American upright, Japanese upright, or tabletop cabinets for the screen border. The collection also includes access to an online ranking system and a trailer for the Pac-Man and the Ghostly Adventures animated series.

In Pac-Man Tilt, players control Pac-Man as he must make it to the end of each level while avoiding ghosts and other obstacles in his way. Tilting the 3DS changes the direction of gravity, which is used to easily climb up steep inclines or turn into a ball to roll down hills and smash through bricks. Pac-Man can defeat the ghosts by finding glowing Power Pellets throughout the level. In Galaga 3D Impact, players control a starship from a first-person perspective throughout a series of levels, destroying formations of enemies and avoiding collision with their projectiles. Moving the 3DS in a fixed direction controls the player in the game. Players can also capture enemies and use their weapons against other enemies and bosses.

== Development and release ==
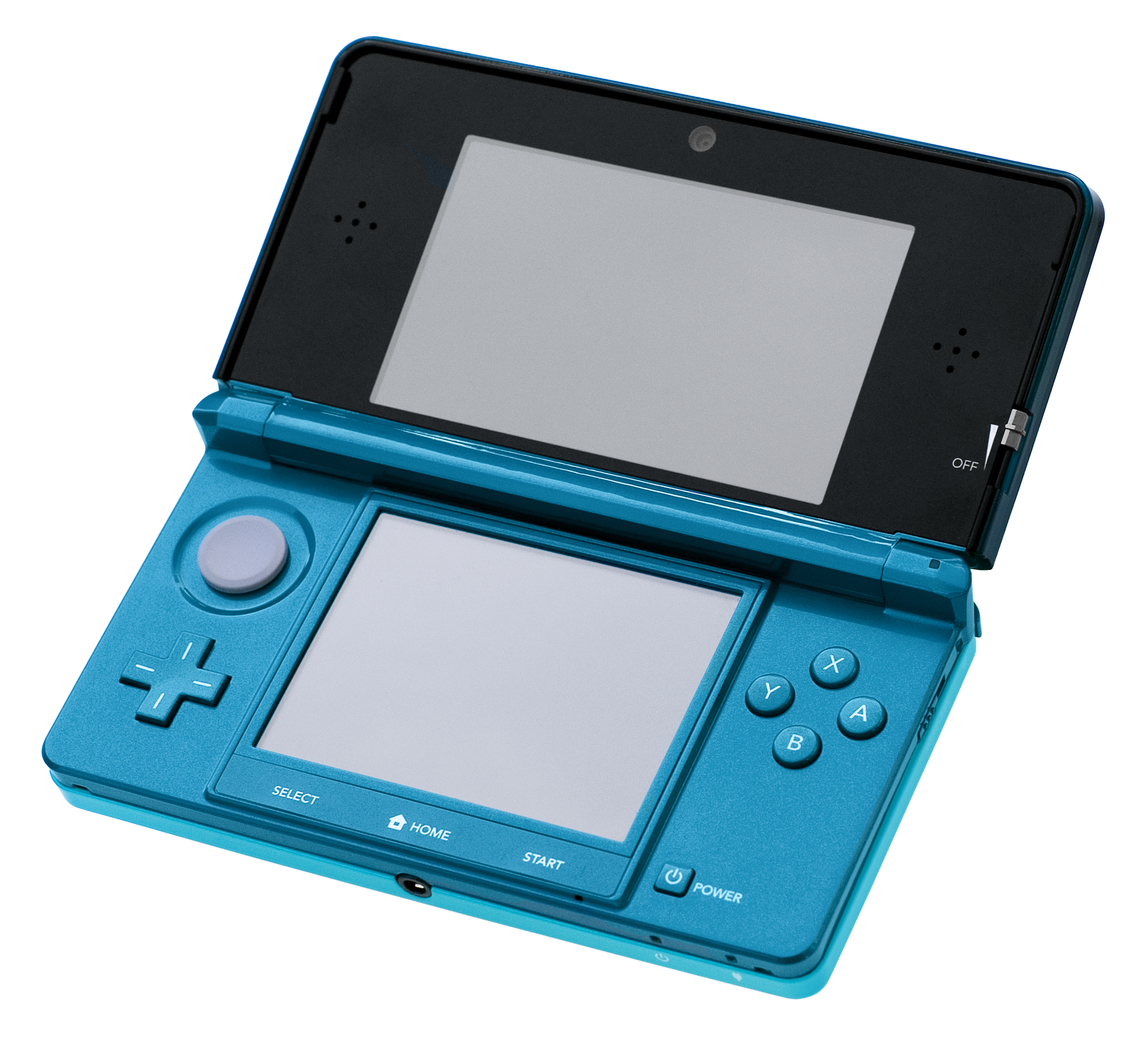
The exclusive games in Pac-Man & Galaga Dimensions were created to take advantage of the hardware capabilities of the 3DS.

Pac-Man & Galaga Dimensions was designed by Takahiro Okano and Takahisa Sugiyama of Namco Bandai Games. As a way to celebrate the 30th anniversaries of Pac-Man and Galaga, the two were commissioned to create a compilation that bridged the two franchises together into a single game. Okano and Sugiyama designed Dimensions to utilize the hardware capabilities of the recently launched Nintendo 3DS, as both showed interest in the system's specifications. Their interest lead to the creation of the two exclusive games, Galaga 3D Impact and Pac-Man Tilt, which became the first games they designed for the company. Okano created Tilt, based on his fascination with the handheld's gyroscopic sensor. He created an early prototype where players launched Pac-Man into a goal by tilting the 3DS, which while interested in the idea believed its concept proved confusing for players. In response, Okano reworked it into a side-scrolling platformer where players titled the system to move Pac-Man through a series of levels.

Galaga 3D Impact was designed by Sugiyama. He also designed the game after the gyro sensor, as he believed it was a unique concept for a shooter. Early iterations of 3D Impact were third-person shooters that allowed players to view the entirety of their ship, which was changed to a first-person view to feel more immersive. Sugiyama had difficulties with implementing the 3D effects, creating multiple revisions to make objects pop-out while also making sure they weren't blurry on the eyes. A separate team of programmers worked on the ports of Pac-Man Championship Edition and Galaga Legions; their inclusion was due to neither having received a portable version prior, and for being important installments in their respective series. The angled monitor display for the original Pac-Man and Galaga were inspired by the depth perception of dioramas.

Namco Bandai announced Pac-Man & Galaga Dimensions in February 2011, alongside DualPenSports and Ridge Racer 3D, and demonstrated it at E3 2011. In a preview, GameSpot showed interest in the two exclusives and the inclusion of online leaderboards. The game was published in Japan on June 23, 2011, in North America on July 27, 2011, in Australia on August 4, 2011, and in Europe on August 26, 2011. The Japanese, Australian, and European versions of Dimensions were published by Namco Bandai, while the North American version was published under the original Namco brand name.

== Reception ==
Reception

Aggregate score
Aggregator	Score
Metacritic	60/100

Review scores
Publication	Score
Famitsu	30/40
GamePro	
GamesRadar+	3/5
IGN	5/10
Nintendo Life	7/10
Nintendo World Report	7.5/10
Nintendojo	B

According to the review aggregator website Metacritic, Pac-Man & Galaga Dimensions received "mixed or average" reviews. The game sold 10,785 units in Japan alone. Critics were generally divided by the amount of content included and if it was worth the price. While the four reviewers at Famitsu said that Dimensions offered a great deal of games for a good pricepoint, Jack DeVries of IGN stated otherwise, writing that it is "far too high for such a mediocre collection." DeVries also criticized the game for being a generally weak collection, and for "actually a bastardization of two awesome game series."

Critics generally agreed that one of the strong points of Dimensions was the inclusion of Pac-Man Championship Edition and Galaga Legions. DeVries said that the games were entertaining and almost a reason to buy the collection. However, he also argued that they should have been $5 downloads on the Nintendo eShop instead. Nintendojo's Aaron Roberts believed that both games were great and solid updates to their predecessors. Galaga Legions in particular was liked by Kyle Hilliard of GamesRadar+, but claimed Galaga Legions DX was a better game and that the graphics weren't as well-done as those in the Xbox 360 iteration. Writing for Nintendo Life, Jon Wahlgren listed Championship Edition and Legions as the highlight of the package. He stated they were both "gripping new spins on their respective elders" and would entice console gamers with their action-packed gameplay. Wahlgren noted that Legions suffered from slowdown when there was too much going on, but said it wasn't enough to distract players.

The included ports of the original Pac-Man and Galaga were also met with mixed reactions. Critics unanimously agreed that both games were timeless and still fun to play, but that the squashed screen resolution made them difficult to play. Nintendo World Report's Andy Goregen commended the 3D support for making the games much more unique than previous re-releases. Wahlgren agreed with Goregen and added that the ability to swap between using an upright or tabletop border design would please fans, but said the "almost comical" screen resolution makes them tough to play, especially with the 3D mode. DeVries said they both lack an impressive presentation. The ports were viewed by Hilliard as being more of a novelty than anything else, saying the poor screen resolution and size made these less appealing than players would think.

Reviewers were split regarding the two new games, Galaga 3D Impact and Pac-Man Tilt. While some said they were both fun and great extras, others claimed they lacked polish and could have used some definite improvement. The reviewers at Famitsu dedicated most of their review to them, finding them to be entertaining and solid additions to Dimensions. On the contrary, DeVries stated they were only noteworthy for the novelty, and that in actuality they're "boring, awkward titles that completely miss why either of these franchises are fun." He disliked Tilt for its controls and 3D Impact for coming off as a shallow clone of Panzer Dragoon. GamePro's Ray Barnholt liked Tilt for being a cute, interesting platformer, and said it made it worth the purchase of Dimensions. Furthermore, he said 3D Impact could entertain players, but was way too short and felt more like a virtual theme park attraction than a full game. Critics agreed that 3D Impact in particular was hindered by its 3D effect, which made the game hard to play and were ineffective. Roberts compared 3D Impact to the first-person segments in Steel Diver, and said the exclusives helped increase the attractiveness of the compilation. Goregen liked the game's layer of strategy through its multiple weapons, but said it suffered from poor 3D effects. Critics also directed attention towards the inclusion of the trailer for Pac-Man and the Ghostly Adventures. Wahlgren called it "utterly bizarre" and something that needed to be seen to be believed. Overall, many critics concluded that Dimensions was an incomplete collection and needed plenty of polish to be of good quality. Barnholt told readers that they should instead buy 3D Classics Xevious if they wanted some classic Namco action in portable form. While the game received criticism for its inability to erase high scores, a representative of Namco Bandai reached out to publications and confirmed that it was possible via a button code.
