= The Outfoxies =

1995 video game

- Promotional sales flyer
- Developer: Namco
- Publisher: Namco
- Director: Masuya Ohishi
- Producers: Akihiko Tokue; Shukuo Ishikawa
- Designer: Masateru Umeda
- Programmer: Yoshiyuki Honda
- Composer: Masahiro Fukuzawa
- Platform: Arcade
- Release: JP: March 1995
- Genre: Fighting
- Modes: Single-player, multiplayer
- Arcade system: Namco NB-2

The Outfoxies (Note: Japanese: アウトフォクシーズ, Hepburn: Autofokkushīzu) is a 1995 fighting video game developed and published by Namco for arcades. Controlling one of seven assassins, players are tasked with defeating opponents with different types of weapons, while also avoiding different obstacles brought on by various stage gimmicks. Weapons range from firearms such as pistols, machine guns and rocket launchers, to more outlandish items such as pie and bowls of hot soup. It runs on the Namco NB-2 arcade system.

The game was designed by Masateru Umeda, who created the arcade game Dancing Eyes a year later. It was largely ignored upon release, due to 3D fighting games overshadowing 2D ones and the market being dominated by both Capcom and SNK. In retrospect, the game has garnered critical acclaim for its outlandish and bizarre action themes, often being compared to action films and games developed by Goichi Suda. Several have recognized it for pioneering gameplay elements found in later arena-based fighting games, particularly the Super Smash Bros. series.

== Gameplay ==
Two players battle on a plane

The Outfoxies is a fighting game which pits players into one-on-one arena combat. Players chose from a collection of assassins to play as, with the goal of killing the other player's character. The game features seven playable characters: John Smith, a mercenary; Betty Doe, a business woman; Prof. Ching, a scientist in a wheelchair; Bernard White, a biomedical engineer with a prosthetic hand; Danny and Demi, twin children; Dweeb, a chimpanzee; and Eve, a former film star turned criminal. Players must defeat each of the other assassins before confronting the game's final boss, Mr. and Mrs. Acme. Each character has a special ability. Players can perform close-quarter attacks which do slight damage, but the larger damage is inflicted by using weapons scattered across the stage. The weapons vary from conventional pistols, machine guns, rocket launchers, flamethrowers, and swords to more outlandish items such as hot soup or pie. Some crates and barrels can be tossed as well. If a player gets hit while they are holding a weapon, they will drop it.

The stages are large and contain multiple platforms and obstacles the player can run and jump to navigate around. The environments also employ thematic events and scenarios which can damage players and dynamically change the playing field over the course of the fight. For example, in an aquarium stage, the water tanks rupture during the fight and flood the stage. In the water are sharks which can hurt players. In another stage set on a skyscraper, the players start at the top and scale down the building as it slowly explodes. The other stages have gimmicks as well, such as planes and boats that shake and sway.

== Development and release ==
The Outfoxies was developed by Namco and released in Japanese arcades in March 1995. (Note: The game's title screen provides a copyright date of 1994, so some third party sources have incorrectly placed the game's release in that year.) The game was designed by Masateru Umeda, who later went on to design Dancing Eyes (1996), a game similar to Qix (1981). The Outfoxies did not garner much attention at release. At the time, 3D games were beginning to overshadow 2D games in terms of popularity in the arcades. The few players still loyal to 2D fighting games were largely playing those developed by Capcom and SNK. Original The Outfoxies arcade boards are now rare and collectible. A PlayStation port was announced in August 1995 but was never released. In December 2025, Hamster Corporation released the game as part of their Arcade Archives series for the Nintendo Switch and PlayStation 4, as well as their Arcade Archives 2 series for the Nintendo Switch 2, PlayStation 5 and Xbox Series X/S.

== Reception and legacy ==
In April 1995, Game Machine listed The Outfoxies as being the fourth most popular arcade game in Japan at the time. Although it did not gather much attention at release, the game has been well received in retrospective analysis. In particular, the game has been noted for its eccentric and inordinate violence and action, similar to action films. Hardcore Gaming 101 wrote that it feels like a "ridiculously over-the-top" action film. Game*Spark wrote that it felt like a disaster film or a B-class action film. Destructoid highlighted the game's bizarre cast of characters, and wrote that the game had more "weirdness and non-stop violence" than games developed by Goichi Suda which are typically associated with those elements. Game*Spark agreed it had thematic elements consistent with those in Suda's games. Coincidentally, Suda is a fan of The Outfoxies and owns a copy which is displayed and playable at Grasshopper Manufacture's offices. Although there are thematic similarities between it and his game Killer7 (2005), he has said he learned about The Outfoxies after developing Killer7, and any such similarities are just coincidence. Both Game*Spark and Rock, Paper, Shotgun wrote that the game felt like a modern indie game. More specifically, Game*Spark and Suda compared it to Hotline Miami (2012).

The general game design was also praised. Rock, Paper, Shotgun wrote that they were constantly surprised by the variety of throwable items and the outlandish stage gimmicks. Game*Spark believed that the game's diverse stage layouts and their ability to change dynamically over time were some of its best features. Hardcore Gaming 101 agreed, writing that the stages were creative and cinematic. They believed The Outfoxies was ahead of its time and a "one of a kind" game, describing it as a cross between Rolling Thunder (1986) and Elevator Action Returns (1994).

The Outfoxies is regarded as an early example of an arena fighting game, vastly predating and possibly inspiring the Super Smash Bros. series. Destructoid listed it as number one on their list of Super Smash Bros. alternatives. GamesRadar+ wrote that it "may very well be the greatest Smash Bros. knock-off of all time" despite its release four years before the first Super Smash Bros. game. They wrote that The Outfoxies had more extravagant violence while the Super Smash Bros. series has a more playful and innocent feeling. Hardcore Gaming 101 wrote that it is different enough from Super Smash Bros. to be worth playing in its own right.

The developers behind Star Wars: The Force Unleashed II drew inspiration from The Outfoxies when developing the game's four-player fighting mode.
