= Galaga Legions =

2008 video game

- Developer: Namco Bandai Games
- Publisher: Namco Bandai Games
- Director: Tadashi Iguchi
- Series: Galaxian
- Platform: Xbox 360
- Release: August 20, 2008
- Genre: Twin-stick shooter
- Mode: Single-player

Galaga Legions (Note: Japanese: ギャラガレギオンズ, Hepburn: Gyaraga Regionzu) is a 2008 twin-stick shooter video game developed and published by Namco Bandai Games for the Xbox 360 (via Xbox Live Arcade). It is the twelfth game in the Galaxian series, and the third developed for home platforms. The player controls a starship, the AEf-7 "Blowneedle", in its efforts to wipe out the Galaga armada. The objective of the game is to clear each of the five stages as quick as possible. Stages have a heavy emphasis on puzzle solving and chain reactions, which are necessary to clear out enemy formations. The Blowneedle has a pair of satellites at its disposal, and can place them anywhere on the screen to fend off enemies.

Development began in August 2007, headed by director Tadashi Iguchi, with the goal being to iron out many of the flaws present in the original Galaga while offering a brand new gameplay experience. It was created to be appealing for both hardcore shoot 'em up players as well as newcomers to the series. The twin-stick gameplay was added to both show off technical capabilities of the next-generation platforms it ran upon, as well as to keep the fundamentals of the original Galaga. Gaplus, the third entry in the series, was a major source of inspiration for the game. Early versions referred to the game as Galaga Evolution Edition.

Upon release, Galaga Legions was met with a favorable reception from critics, often being compared to Geometry Wars: Retro Evolved. Reviewers applauded the game's visuals, strategic gameplay and addictive nature, but criticized its high price point and little resemblance to the original. A direct sequel game, titled Galaga Legions DX, was released for the Xbox 360, PlayStation 3 and Windows Phone in 2011, being the second game under the Namco Generations label. The original game was ported to the Nintendo 3DS in 2011 as part of the compilation Pac-Man & Galaga Dimensions.

== Gameplay ==
Galaga Legions is a twin-stick shooter video game serving as a modern remake of the original Galaga. The player assumes control of a star ship, the AEf-7 "Blowneedle", as it must vanquish the Galaga forces before they destroy the human race. The game is divided into five stages, each having four "areas" - the objective is to complete these areas in the quickest time possible, by destroying all of the enemy formations. Enemies can appear from the top, sides and bottom of the screen, their path being indicated by glowing neon lines. Some enemies will explode when shot and destroy anything around them, which can be used to launch chain reactions.

The Blowneedle is equipped with two satellites, capable of shooting at oncoming enemies. The satellites are able to detach from the ship, and can be placed anywhere on the screen to help fend off enemies. Satellites can also be reattached to the Blowneedle if necessary. Some enemy formations will carry a black hole bomb, which when shot causes all enemies on-screen to be sucked in and become allies with the player, similar to the "duel fighter" mechanic from the original Galaga. The end of each stage has the player face off against a group of "boss" enemies, which when defeated will allow the player to progress onward.

Two gameplay modes are present, "Championship" and "Adventure", each having differentiating gameplay rules and mechanics - Championship is a score attack mode that has the player destroying several waves of enemies, while Adventure places the player through a campaign mode with increasing difficulty and enemy attack patterns. Additionally, the player can equip one of three different skins that alter the game's visual appearance, including one that replaces the player and enemy sprites with those from the original Galaga. An autofire option is also included, as is a replay feature that allows the player to watch a recording of their gameplay from an earlier stage.

== Development and release ==
Galaga Legions began development in August 2007, headed by director Tadashi Iguchi. Iguchi, who previously worked on Pac-Man Championship Edition, was interested in creating a new game in the series due to the original's massive popularity and recognition. The goal of the project was to iron out the flaws in the original Galaga arcade game, while still offering an exciting gameplay experience new to consoles. At the start of development, Iguchi and his team broke down many of the elements from Galaga to rework them into the new game; however, this would instead be a frustration for developers, with many ideas having to be remade or canned entirely. Several different gameplay styles were tested early on, such as a Xevious-type shooter with ground targets to destroy and a side-scroller with elements from rhythm games; neither of these proved to be successful with playtesters, leading to the game becoming a single-screen shooter akin to the original. Early versions of the game were known as Galaga Evolution Edition.

Early versions of Galaga Legions featured an isometric camera angle with a Xevious-esque ground enemy targeting system.

Much of the inspiration for the project was drawn from Gaplus, the third game in the Galaxian series; in this game, enemies would fly into formation from the sides of the screen as well as from the top. Iguchi used this idea to help break the mold of the original, and to be a surprise for players familiar with the enemy movements established in the first game. Gaplus also inspired the eight-directional movement for the player's ship, as well as the enemy-capturing black hole bomb, which also paid homage to the tractor beam idea from Galaga. Stages were created to have puzzle elements, such as which enemy to shoot or which area the player should place their ship. The enemy-indication neon lines were added to keep the game fair for newer players, helping to prevent them from colliding with off-screen enemies.

The game was also created to appeal to both hardcore fans and newcomers of the shoot 'em up genre of games. Once the basic mechanics of the original were reworked into the project, Iguchi stated that the game should strengthen the strategic element of Galaga and implement new and interesting ideas. The satellites were added to keep the fundamental excitement of the original and show off technological capabilities of next-generation systems. By the end of development, the team had added so many new ideas and mechanics that Iguchi referred to the game as a "mutation" of Galaga.

Galaga Legions was released for both the Xbox 360 worldwide on August 20, 2008. It was one of the nine included Xbox Live Arcade games in Namco Museum Virtual Arcade. It was also packaged into the 2012 Nintendo 3DS game Pac-Man & Galaga Dimensions, alongside five other games from the Galaxian and Pac-Man series.

== Reception ==
Reception

Aggregate scores
Aggregator	Score
GameRankings	76%
Metacritic	74/100

Review scores
Publication	Score
1Up.com	A−
Eurogamer	8/10
GameSpot	8/10
Giant Bomb	3/5
IGN	7.7/10
TeamXbox	8.5/10

Galaga Legions received a favorable response from critics, with praise given to its visuals, addictive gameplay and usage of puzzle-solving. It has an average critic score of 76% on GameRankings and 74/100 on Metacritic.

Eurogamer called it a "ferociously addictive and forward-thinking shoot-'em-up", while 1UP.com labeled it "one of the most fiercely competitive multiplayer games on XBLA", praising its addictive nature. 1UP also compared the game's quality to shoot'em up games by Capcom and Treasure. Giant Bomb called it "an interesting and unique take on static-screen shooters". The addition of satellites was also praised - IGN called it a "great addition" to the game for adding a sense of strategy, which both Eurogamer and GameSpot also applauded. 1UP also praised its use of puzzle-solving for the "sense of achievement" it brings. The game's visuals were highly praised; IGN labeled it as one of the best-looking games on Xbox Live Arcade, particularly praising its detailed backgrounds, while 1UP and Eurogamer compared the graphics favorably to those in Geometry Wars: Retro Evolved. GameSpot applauded its techno soundtrack and sound effects for staying true to the original.

Despite its praise, many would criticize the game's little resemblance to the original Galaga alongside its high price point. Giant Bomb was particularly negative, stating it "doesn't do a very good job" at being a successor to the original for having very little to do with Galaga. IGN disliked the game's high price point, saying the little amount of content didn't justify its $10 price tag, as well as criticizing the selectable skins for simply being cosmetic. While GameSpot criticized the game's lack of multiplayer modes, 1UP would contest this, writing "once you start playing, it's easy to understand why this game doesn't really need 'em."

== Sequel ==
A direct sequel to the game, Galaga Legions DX, was released in 2011 for both the Xbox 360 and PlayStation 3, and later for Windows Phone in 2012. It was released as part of the Namco Generations label, which was used for remakes of older Namco video games. The sequel adds several new features to the original game, such as a slowdown effect when near enemies, boss enemies that wipe out entire enemy formations, and score attack competitions held periodically by Bandai Namco for a short time. It was added to the Xbox One's backwards comparability lineup in 2016.
