= Namco Generations =

Video game brand name

- Product type: Video game label
- Produced by: Namco Bandai Games
- Introduced: November 16, 2010
- Discontinued: December 8, 2012
- Website: ng.namco-ch.net (English, archived)

Namco Generations (Note: Japanese: ナムコジェネレーションズ, Hepburn: Namuko Jenerēshonzu) was a brand name created by Namco Bandai Games for modernized remakes of their older video games. It was introduced in 2010 in conjunction with Pac-Man Championship Edition DX for the Xbox 360 and PlayStation 3. Galaga Legions DX was the second game to use the brand, being released in 2011. Two other games were in production under the Namco Generations label, a Metro-Cross sequel named Aero-Cross and a remaster of Dancing Eyes, both of which were cancelled.

The Namco Generations brand was conceived and led by chief producer Hideo Yoshizawa, known as the creator of Klonoa and Mr. Driller, and assisted by Tadashi Iguchi. The idea behind the series was to recreate the healthy proximity between developers and consumers that the original Namco company had done, and to modernize and garner interest in their older franchises. Each Namco Generations game came with a digital newsletter that provided information on upcoming titles, developer interviews, and gameplay tips. Updates on the project began to slow down as the years progressed, before ultimately being shuttered in late 2012.

The Namco Generations project was deemed a failure by reviewers. They commented that the company's prolonged silence about the project and the general lack of a wider audience had contributed to its downfall, alongside the two cancelled games being generally unimpressive and not living up to expectations. Both Pac-Man Championship Edition DX and Galaga Legions DX remain available on their respective platforms — the 2013 update to the former, renaming it to Pac-Man Championship Edition DX+, removes all instances of Namco Generations from the game.

== History ==
The Namco Generations series was led by chief producer Hideo Yoshizawa. A highly respected game developer in Japan, he is best known as the creator of Klonoa and Mr. Driller, two widely-successful series for developer Namco. The idea for the project came from an attempt by Namco Bandai Games to recreate the healthy proximity between developers and consumers, which was a common trait of the original Namco company. Namco Bandai also saw it as an opportunity to revive and modernize many of their older intellectual properties, and to revive interest in them. The name and idea of the label is derived from the video game newsletter Namco Community Magazine NG, published in Japan throughout the 1980s and early 1990s as a way for Namco to connect with their fans and provide news on their upcoming titles. Assisting in production of the series came from Tadashi Iguchi, the designer for Pac-Man Championship Edition and Galaga Legions, both of which were successful updates of classic arcade games.

When laying down the foundations for the brand, the company focused primarily on allowing consumers to interact directly with developers through digital newsletters and social media platforms, which they felt would allow for more feedback on projects. Namco Bandai Games America vice president Carlson Choi told IGN that the brand was to "[solidify] NAMCO BANDAI Games' commitment to provide high quality and compelling content through the digital space". The company also wanted the branded games to "raise the bar" in terms of content, and to allow players to experience these older games in a brand-new way.

Namco Bandai officially unveiled the Namco Generations brand on November 16, 2010. Three games were announced for release under the label: Pac-Man Championship Edition DX and Galaga Legions DX, both being updates of Iguchi's previous projects, and Aero-Cross, a modernized remake of Metro-Cross. Each game featured an option to view a special "NG News" digital newsletter, which featured developer interviews, gameplay tips, and information regarding upcoming titles. Pac-Man Championship Edition DX was released a day later on November 17 for the Xbox 360 and PlayStation 3 to critical acclaim, being listed among the greatest video game remakes of all time and as a good example on how to successfully revive a classic video game. Galaga Legions DX was published several months later on June 29, 2011 also to positive reception, specifically towards its unique gameplay and presentation. In June, Namco Bandai unveiled a fourth game under the brand, a reboot of the Japan-exclusive arcade game Dancing Eyes. Due to the game's strong sexual nature and for being rather obscure, it was met with dire confusion from publications. Siliconera speculated that modern remakes of Battle City, Rally-X, and Starblade were also in the works.

Updates on the project began to slow down by the end of 2011, with the company posting very little information regarding the brand and the games under production for it. In April 2012, Japanese magazine Famitsu reported that Namco Bandai decided to cancel the reboot of Dancing Eyes. In December, Aero-Cross and subsequently the Namco Generations label as a whole, were also cancelled. Namco Bandai cited "various circumstances" as the reason for the project's termination. Publications have speculated the lack of interest and a wider audience caused the brand to be discontinued. The DX versions of Pac-Man Championship Edition and Galaga Legions are still available on their respective platforms, the former removing the Namco Generations newsletter entirely when it was updated in 2013.

Video game publications have deemed the Namco Generations brand as a failure, saying that a general lack of a large audience and silence towards the project were factors in its downfall. JG Fletcher of Engadget blamed the cancellation of the remaining two games and a general lack of updates from Bandai Namco for the Namco Generations label being discontinued. He noted the company's unusual quiet nature towards the project in general, as well as commenting that neither of the cancelled titles lived up to the expectations of the first two games. Fletcher also felt that Dancing Eyes felt more like a tribute to an "amusing" idea rather than an attempt to truly resurrect an older IP, writing: "I'm not overly interested in seeing increasing amounts of polygonal skin. Rather than prurient interest in cartoon women, my fascination with Dancing Eyes is more about seeing Namco pay tribute to something that was, at best, an amusing idea, and at worst, something Namco had no sense reminding people of". Siliconera showed disappointment towards the project's cancellation for being the end of an era for the company, saying: "With no more Namco Generations titles in the pipeline, it looks like the age of modernized Namco arcade games is over".

== See also ==
- ShiftyLook
