= Stock car (disambiguation) =

Stock car, referring to a production car, usually refers to Stock car racing.

Stock car may also refer to:

- Stock car (rail), wagon used for carrying livestock
- Stock Car (film), 1955 British crime drama
- Stock Car (video game), released in 1984
- Stock Car Racing (magazine), American magazine since 1966
- Stock Car Races, Canadian sports television series
- Stock Car Light
- Stock Car Brasil
- Production car
