= Castle Quest =

Castle Quest may refer to:

- Castlequest, a 1986 video game for the Famicom/NES consoles and MSX computer
- Castle Quest (1985 video game), a 1985 video game for the BBC Micro
- Castle Quest (Famicom), a 1990 video game for NES
- Castle Quest (1993 video game), a 1993 video game for the Game Boy
