= Qix++ =

2009 video game

- Xbox 360 cover art
- Developer: Taito
- Publisher: Taito
- Composer: Zuntata
- Series: Qix
- Platforms: Xbox 360, PlayStation Portable
- Release: Xbox 360: WW: December 9, 2009; PlayStation Portable: JP: February 25, 2010
- Genre: Puzzle
- Modes: Single-player, multiplayer

Qix++ (Note: Japanese: クイックスプラスプラス, Hepburn: Kuikkusu Purasu Purasu) is a video game developed and released by Taito for Xbox Live Arcade on December 9, 2009 and the PlayStation Portable on February 25, 2010 exclusively in Japan. It is the fifth game in the Qix series, and adds several new features, such as different Qix types, powerups, and new enemies. The Xbox 360 version of Qix++ was added to the Xbox Backwards compatibility list on September 8, 2016 making it 100% compatible with Xbox One and later, the Xbox Series X and series S. As of August 2, 2026 it was still available to buy on the Xbox Game Store.

== Gameplay ==
In-game screenshot

Qix++ is an action puzzle video game that is similar to its predecessors. The objective of each level is to use a triangle-shaped marker to claim the majority of the playfield, which is accomplished by creating, or "drawing", lines across the screen. When lines connect to the boundary of the playfield, it creates a box on the playfield, indicating that part of the screen has been claimed by the player. Boxes can also be created by connecting lines to pre-existing boxes. The top of the screen indicates the amount of space the player needs to claim in order to progress, measured in percentage. While completing this task, the player will need to avoid the Qix, a create that takes the form of various geometric shapes. The Qix can kill the player with one touch, and can also destroy any lines the player is drawing. The player will also need to avoid the Sparx, deadly balls of lightning that follow the player's lines. Sparx can be defeated by trapping them in boxes.

Qix++ includes multiple additions to the core gameplay. Most stages contain black-colored boxes, which if encased in a box, awards the player a power-up item. Power-ups provide many unique abilities, ranging from those that cause the Qix to shrink in size and slow down, to those that increase the movement speed of the cursor. A multiplayer mode allows four players to battle against each other to be the last person standing, avoiding the Qix and each other's boxes. The Japan-exclusive PlayStation Portable version includes several new gamemodes. These include Float Mode, which creates predetermined boxes on the screen; Hunt Mode, where the player must "trap" the Qix by surrounding it with boxes; and One-Stroke Mode, where the player has to complete the level with one move. The PlayStation Portable version also includes a port of the original Qix arcade game.

== Soundtrack ==
The soundtrack for Qix++ was composed by Koji Sakurai, a composer who also worked on Space Invaders Extreme and Energy Air Force. Sakurai is a former member of Zuntata, the "house band" of Taito that worked on many of the company's games since the late 1980s. Zuntata itself assisted in production of the music. Their compositions, which are inspired by abstract and techno, were made to convey the game's unique, futuristic atmosphere.

== Reception ==
Reception

Aggregate score
Aggregator	Score
Metacritic	51/100

Review scores
Publication	Score
Famitsu	28/40
GameSpot	4/10
GameZone	4/10
Giant Bomb	2/5
IGN	4.6/10
TeamXbox	7.1/10

The Xbox 360 version of Qix++ sold 10,196 units by 2011, while its downloadable content packs sold a combined total of 1,599 units.

The game received mixed to negative reviews from critics. IGN rated the game as 'Poor' and claimed the player would see everything Qix++ had to offer in 20 minutes.
