= Styx (Windmill game) =

1983 video game

- Developer: Windmill Software
- Publisher: Windmill Software
- Platforms: IBM XT; IBM PC
- Release: 1983
- Genre: Puzzle
- Mode: Single-player

Styx is a video game released by Windmill Software in 1983 as a copy-protected, bootable 5.25" floppy disk for the IBM PC/XT. It is a clone of the 1981 arcade game Qix. In September 2004 the source code of the game became available "for historical interest" (with other Windmill Software games such as Digger). In 1998 Andrew Jenner reverse engineered Styx for modern PCs, calling it Styx Remastered. The original uses a tweaked graphics mode and requires a genuine Color Graphics Adapter card - Styx Remastered works with all graphics adapters, but is not 64bit compatible.
