= Imogen (video game) =

1986 video game

- Developer: Micro Power
- Publishers: Micro Power; Superior Software
- Designer: Michael St Aubyn
- Platforms: BBC Micro B, Acorn Electron
- Release: 1986 (BBC Micro); 1988 (Acorn Electron)
- Genre: Puzzle / platform game

Imogen is a computer game released in 1986 for the BBC Micro. It was written by Michael St Aubyn and published by Micro Power. It was reissued as the lead game of Superior Software / Acornsoft's Play It Again Sam 5 compilation in 1988 when it was also converted for the Acorn Electron. It is a platform game featuring puzzles.

== Gameplay ==
The player takes the role of a wizard named Imogen who, according to the backstory, lost his mind and forgot his identity as a result of transforming himself into a dragon to save his town from another dragon. He is placed into a dungeon within a mountain and in order to escape he must use magic and puzzle-solving abilities. He will only be able to free himself once he is back to his old, sane self and no longer a danger to the townsfolk.

Imogen in Wizard form (BBC Micro)

The game features sixteen levels, which are played in a random order. To complete a level, Imogen needs to obtain a spell fragment which will warp him to the next level or, after all sixteen have been collected and the spell completed, to the outside world, thus completing the game. The spell fragments are always placed somewhere inaccessible at the outset of the level, and obtaining the spell fragments requires some lateral thinking by the player.

Imogen himself is able to transform into three different forms, each with an ability unavailable to the other two:

- His natural form as a human wizard, which can use various objects he picks up along the way (which are as varied as a revolver, watering can and tulip bulb)
- A cat, which can leap long distances
- A monkey, which can climb ropes
- A bird, which can fly (available only in one particular level)

Each level (consisting of a sealed cavern four screens in size) requires transforming back and forth between the forms to complete it. While it is impossible for the player to actually die during the game, the number of transformations is limited to 150, and using them all before the game is complete renders it unwinnable.

Imogen has cartoon-style graphics, with many of the non-player characters being cute versions of animals like rabbits, monkeys, parrots and frogs. One recurring character is a baby-like imp who impedes the progress of the player and is usually dispatched in a terminal way.
