= Ghouls (video game) =

1984 video game

- Acorn Electron cassette cover
- Publisher: Micro Power
- Programmer: David Hoskins
- Platforms: Acorn Electron, BBC Micro, Commodore 64, Amstrad CPC
- Release: 1984
- Genre: Platform
- Mode: Single-player

Ghouls is a platform game written by David Hoskins and published in the UK by Micro Power. It was released on the Acorn Electron, BBC Micro, Commodore 64 and Amstrad CPC in 1984.

== Gameplay ==
In-game screenshot (Acorn Electron)

Ghouls is a platform game, set in a creepy mansion on top of a hill. The player character has the appearance of a Pac-Man sprite on legs and in a similarity to that game can also eat yellow dots for extra points. The main goal of the game however, is to obtain the treasure which is guarded by the deadly inhabitants of the mansion. The player must make their way through rooms such as Spectre's Lair, Horrid Hall, The Spider's Parlour and Death Tower.

Various in-game objects must be negotiated such as poison-smeared spikes, moving platforms, contracting floorboards, powerful springs and bouncing spiders.

== Reception ==
The game was well received by the gaming press. The Micro User called the game "simple but effective". They were particularly impressed with the presentation of the game stating "The game is visually successful in creating a spooky setting, and choosing to play with sound effects only enhances the atmosphere". Electron User also praised the graphics and "eerie sounds," labeling the game "extremely addictive" and concluding "We've come to expect high standard games from Micro Power and Ghouls is one of their best!".
