= Felix in the Factory =

1982 video game

- Developer(s): John Chaytor
- Publisher(s): Micro Power
- Platform(s): Acorn Electron, BBC Micro, Commodore 64, Memotech MTX
- Release: 1982: BBC Micro; 1983: Electron; 1984: Memotech, C64
- Genre(s): Platform
- Mode(s): Single-player

Felix in the Factory is a platform game written by John Chaytor for the BBC Micro and published by Micro Power (a.k.a. Program Power) in 1982. Versions were released for the Acorn Electron (1983), Commodore 64 (1984), and Memotech MTX (1984). It is the first in a trilogy of Micro Power games featuring the factory worker Felix and was followed by Felix and the Fruit Monsters (a Pac-Man style overhead maze game) and another factory-based platformer, Felix meets the Evil Weevils.

== Gameplay ==
Acorn Electron version

The screen layout is clearly influenced by early platform game Space Panic, set out as a series of platforms and ladders populated by enemy 'gremlins' which also bear more than a passing resemblance to the Space Panic monsters. This is the factory of the title. The player takes the role of Felix, a factory worker, whose job is to ensure the generator, in the bottom right of the screen, does not run out of oil. Felix begins at the generator and must cross the conveyor belt, jumping over parcels (in gameplay similar to Donkey Kong). If Felix fails to jump the parcel, he falls down and is carried along the belt for a short while. If he has time to stand up, he can continue on as normal but if he reaches the end of the belt, he loses a life.

C64 version showing the rat on the third platform

After crossing the conveyor belt, Felix can climb into the rest of the factory which contains a number of randomly placed items which can be picked up and used as well as a number of enemies. The main enemies are the various gremlins that patrol the platforms. If they come into contact with Felix, they knock him off the platform and a life is lost. The other hazard is a giant rat which occasionally runs across the screen, again knocking Felix off the platform (although unlike the gremlins, it can be jumped). Felix can collect a pitchfork which lets him run at the gremlins and knock them from the platforms. This only lasts for a brief time (like the axe in Donkey Kong). There is also a bag of rat poison which can be collected and then laid down on a platform in the hope that the rat will run across that platform. Finally, Felix can collect an oil can which he must take back to the generator. If the can is dropped (by running into a wall or falling on the conveyor belt), it spills and he must return for another can. Only one item can be carried at a time.

The oil level is shown in a bar on screen and acts as a timer. As it runs down at a fast rate, the primary objective of the game is usually to collect the oil can and return it to the generator as quickly as possible. This is made especially important as if a life is lost, Felix is returned to the generator but the oil level remains as it was. If the player has spent too much time killing gremlins, this often makes it impossible for Felix to go back for the oil in time. There is a warning 'flicker' as the oil reaches a low level but unless Felix is already on the conveyor belt with a can of oil, it will be too late. If the generator runs out of oil, it is game over. If Felix successfully tops up the generator with oil, the gremlins regenerate (and sometimes increase in number) and play begins again.

== Reception ==
Electron User generally praised the game (although at the time it did not award scores). "It's not easy but it is fun; a fast game calling for quick reflexes and a sense of humour as you try to keep production flowing. ...sound and graphics use the Electron's capabilities to the full."
