= Frenzy (1984 video game) =

- Acorn Electron cassette cover
- Publisher(s): Micro Power
- Platform(s): Acorn Electron, BBC Micro, Commodore 64
- Release: 1984: BBC, Electron; 1985: C64
- Genre(s): Action
- Mode(s): Single-player

Frenzy is an action video game for the Acorn Electron and BBC Micro published in the UK by Micro Power in 1984. It is a variant of the 1981 region-filling arcade video game Qix. Ports were released for the BBC Micro in 1984 and Commodore 64 in 1985.

== Gameplay ==
BBC Micro screenshot

Although the gameplay is similar to Qix, the backstory for Frenzy involves the player controlling a robot craft, attempting to capture deadly sub-atomic Leptons from inside a scientific research centre.

In Frenzy, a Lepton is captured if it is trapped in an area enclosed by the player's robot craft or if 95% of the screen area has been filled. The robot craft has two speeds and the score for filling in an area using only the slower speed is subject to a 2x multiplier. Chasers appear in higher levels which can collide with the player's robot craft, causing a life to be lost. The number of Leptons and Chasers increase as the levels progress, up to a maximum of five of each on the most difficult screens—except for Levels 12 and 14, which have a smaller number of Leptons (and no Chasers) but the Leptons move much faster. The player obtains an extra craft on completing the third, sixth and ninth screens. It has been found that after level 14, the last two screens repeat indefinitely.

It is stated in the instructions that a good strategy is to build narrow filled blocks using the faster speed across the centre of an unfilled area, and then finally seal the area off by using only the slower mode. This maximises the score while reducing the risk of using "slow mode" to a minimum. It can be seen that players of the game tend to stick to this strategy.

Some players remark that Frenzy is not an exact Qix clone. Although the game is clearly derived from Qix, there are crucial differences. In Qix, completing a line fills in the area not containing the Qix regardless of size, whereas in Frenzy, the smaller area is always coloured, allowing Leptons to be trapped (which kills them). In Qix, filling a set percentage is the only way to complete levels; in Frenzy it is more common to complete levels by killing all the Leptons. Also, in Frenzy, the Leptons move in a regular, completely deterministic pattern, and the player's robot craft is permitted to hesitate, making Frenzy a different playing experience to Qix.

== Reception ==
Generally, the game has received a positive response from both players and reviewers.

Frenzy was reviewed in the August 1984 edition of Acorn User and also in issue of Electron User. Adam Young in his review entitled "Simplicity Makes a Winner" described the game as "one of the most amusing and compulsive games on the market" and "excellent".

Oliver Robinson enjoyed playing Frenzy by Micropower. Comparing the game to another similar game called Kix he wrote that Kix had better music, while Frenzy had better gameplay. The music to Kix is "Scarborough Fair" and "House of the Rising Sun"; Frenzy has no music at all.

Other players have described the game as "a great family favourite", a "favourite game" and "simple, but addictive".
