= Gauntlet (Micro Power video game) =

1984 video game

- Electron cassette cover
- Publisher: Micro Power
- Programmer: Chris Terran
- Platforms: Acorn Electron, BBC Micro, Amstrad CPC
- Release: 1984: BBC, Electron; 1985: CPC
- Mode: Single-player

Gauntlet is a clone of Defender written by Chris Terran published in the UK by Micro Power. Described as "a very competent implementation of one of the most popular arcade games", it was initially released for the Acorn Electron, and later made available for the BBC Micro, with an Amstrad CPC version arriving in 1985.

== Gameplay ==
Electron screenshot

The player controls an X15 spacecraft, protecting canisters from the hostile Reeg forces. In the game, Reeg landers search the landscape for canisters. If a lander grabs a canister and makes it to the top of the screen, it turns into a mutant. The player must shoot the enemy ship to release a grabbed canister, but if it falls too far, then it's destroyed on impact. There are also other ships such as cruisers, which when hit, unleash buzzer ships.

The player has smart bombs available which destroy all on-screen enemies. On the higher levels there are additional enemy ships such as mine layers which are capable of launching killer ships, unless the player can destroy them quickly. If the player allows destruction of all canisters, then a hoard of mutants attack and the landscape completely disappears.
