= Metro-Cross =

1985 video game

- European arcade flyer
- Developer: Namco
- Publishers: JP: Namco; WW: Kitkorp
- Designer: Tatsuro Okamoto
- Composer: Nobuyuki Ohnogi
- Platforms: Arcade, Amstrad CPC, Atari ST, Commodore 64, Family Computer, ZX Spectrum
- Release: JP: May 1985; NA: November 1985; EU: 1985
- Genre: Platform
- Modes: Single-player, multiplayer
- Arcade system: Namco Pac-Land

Metro-Cross (Note: Japanese: メトロクロス, Hepburn: Metoro Kurosu) is a 1985 platform video game developed and published by Namco for arcades. It was released in Japan in May 1985 and in North America by Kitkorp in November 1985. It was later ported to the Amstrad CPC, Atari ST, Commodore 64, Family Computer, and ZX Spectrum.

== Gameplay ==
The player leaping over a hurdle

The player takes control of a man known only as Runner, who is given a time limit to run through each of the game's thirty-two rounds while avoiding obstacles and collecting drink cans. The actual running happens automatically and the goal of the player is to avoid the obstacles and collect the cans by moving the Runner with the stick and adjusting his speed accordingly.

If the Runner finishes the round within the time limit, the remaining time will be awarded to him as bonus points and he will proceed to the next round. Every fourth round is special, using the remaining time from the three previous ones as additional time. However, if the Runner has not finished the round before the time limit runs out, he will be electrocuted and the game will immediately end.

Obstacles along the way include Slip Zones which will slow the Runner down if he tries to cross over them, Pitfalls which will break under the Runner's weight and drop him into the holes underneath, and Crackers which will launch the Runner up into the air and cause him to land on his back. Later rounds also feature Jumbo Tires that bounce towards the Runner, Walls that move up and down from the ground, Cubes that move through particular columns of tiles, Mice that attempt to jump onto the Runner and slow him down, and Chess Knights and Kings that bounce from one tile to another.

The rounds also feature Springboards, which can be used to propel the Runner forward at a great speed. Some rounds have a special layout of Springboards, where it is possible to use one Springboard to land directly on the second one. Some other rounds also feature Skateboards which will speed the Runner up and make him immune to Slip Zones. There are also two different types of drink cans; kicking them will either grant the player bonus points (from 100 to 5000) or speed the Runner up, but jumping on them will stop the timer for a few seconds.

== Reception ==
Game Machine listed Metro-Cross as being the ninth most popular arcade game of June 1985 in Japan.

== Legacy ==
Metro-Cross was re-released as part of Namco Museum Volume 5 for PlayStation and Namco Museum Virtual Arcade for Xbox 360 (renamed Retro-Cross in the European and Australian versions of Virtual Arcade).

A high definition sequel called Aero-Cross was being developed for the Xbox Live Arcade and PlayStation Network as part of the Namco Generations line until it was cancelled along with the Namco Generations brand itself being discontinued. Multiple players would have been able to simultaneously play, similar to Konami's Hyper Olympic games.

A theme based on Metro-Cross is featured in Pac-Man 99, as special DLC.

Hamster Corporation released the game as part of their Arcade Archives series for the Nintendo Switch and PlayStation 4 in August 2022.
