= Galaga Legions DX =

2011 video game

- Xbox Live Arcade cover art
- Developer: Namco Bandai Games
- Publisher: Namco Bandai Games
- Director: Tadashi Iguchi
- Producer: Toshiko Tamura
- Composer: Akihiko Ishikawa
- Series: Galaxian
- Platforms: Xbox 360, PlayStation 3, Windows Phone
- Release: June 29, 2011: Xbox 360; WW: June 29, 2011 PlayStation 3; JP/NA: August 4, 2011; EU: August 10, 2011 Windows Phone; WW: August 28, 2012
- Genres: Twin-stick shooter, bullet hell
- Mode: Single-player

Galaga Legions DX (Note: Japanese: ギャラガレギオンズDX, Hepburn: Gyaraga Regionzu DX) is a 2011 twin-stick shooter video game developed and published by Namco Bandai Games for the Xbox 360 (via Xbox Live Arcade) and PlayStation 3 (via PlayStation Network). It is the sequel to Galaga Legions (2008), and the fourteenth entry in the Galaxian series. The player controls the AEf-7 "Blowneedle" starship in its efforts to wipe out the Galaga forces before they destroy all of mankind. The objective is to clear each of the game's nine stages in the quickest time possible by destroying waves of enemies. The Blowneedle has a pair of satellites that can be pointed at enemies to shoot them down. New additions have been made to the core gameplay, such as a "slowdown" effect when the player is about to collide with an enemy.

The game was developed by the same team behind Pac-Man Championship Edition DX, headed by director Tadashi Iguchi and producer Toshiko Tamura. Iguchi thought the original Legions tried too hard to be original and only appealed to a niche audience, deciding to make the game appeal towards more casual players with simple controls and a focus on frantic gameplay. The team focused heavily on high-score battles as a callback to video game tournaments from the early 1980s, and to appeal towards both veterans and newcomers to the Galaxian series. It was the second and last game released under the Namco Generations label (which was discontinued in 2012), and was made to coincide with the 30th anniversary of the original Galaga arcade game.

Upon release, Galaga Legions DX received mostly favorable reviews from critics. Reviewers praised the game's graphics, frantic gameplay and improvements made over its predecessor, although some criticized its lack of content and said it was less well-refined than the first game. A Windows Phone version of the game was released in 2012. The Xbox 360 version was made available on the Xbox One in 2016 as part of the system's backwards compatibility lineup. It was the only other game released under the Namco Generations label, as it was discontinued a year after the game's release in 2012.

== Gameplay ==
In Galaga Legions DX, players control a starship named the AEf-7 Blowneedle in its mission to eradicate the hostile Galaga forces. Players traverse through ten different stages, which are divided up into four sections each and become progressively difficult. Players can begin at any level they choose. Each section consists of multiple waves of enemies, with players needing to destroy as many as they can before the time limit runs out. Player score and progress is tallied up in a bar graph displayed upon completion of each section, culminating in a final area where players must destroy a boss.

Xbox 360 version screenshot

Gameplay of Legions DX has been compared to similar twin-stick shooters such as Geometry Wars. In each wave, players must destroy large formations of constantly-moving enemies while avoiding collision with them or opposing projectiles. If the Blowneedle is about to collide with an enemy or shot, a slowdown effect is applied that gives players a chance to escape before dying. The objective is to clear each section as quickly as possible, with bonus points awarded for destroying enemies under a par time. Enemies fly in pre-determined patterns, indicated by blue neon lines drawn across the screen. Most formations feature large, orbular ships that explode when shot, which can be used to cause chain reactions and easily wipe out larger enemies. The Blowneedle is equipped with two satellites, which can either be pointed in any direction or fixated to the side of the player. Flying closer to enemy formations enables "Focus Fire", which increases the Blowneedle's movement and shooting speed. Destroying circular Black Hole Bombs sucks in all on-screen enemies, who join the player's side and provide additional firepower.

The game features two different play modes: Adventure, where players take on each level in a linear format, and Championship, a score-attack mode where players try to get the highest score in any stage they choose. Before each game beings, players can select a difficulty option and a cosmetic skin, which alters the game's visuals. Many of these replace the Blowneedle and enemies with sprites from other Galaxian games, alongside those from other older Namco games including Pac-Man, Mappy, Dig Dug, and Rally-X.

== Development ==
Tadashi Iguchi in 2009

After completing work on Pac-Man Championship Edition DX (2010), Namco Bandai Games director Tadashi Iguchi began drafting plans for a sequel to one of his previous projects, Galaga Legions (2008). Originally released for the Xbox 360, Legions was a modernized update to Namco's Galaxian series of shoot 'em ups. While the game sold well and was received favorably by publications, a common complaint was its drastic departure from the gameplay of the original Galaxian and Galaga, both of which were fixed overhead shooters. Acknowledging the criticism, Iguchi started production of a sequel that was much more accessible to new players.

Iguchi directed development of Galaga Legions DX. The majority of the developers behind Pac-Man Championship Edition DX assisted him in production, such as producer Toshiko Tamura. The project goal was to create a game that was intuitive and welcoming to both newcomers and franchise veterans, and to find a balance between simplicity and complexity in its gameplay. With the original Galaga Legions, Iguchi felt that it trying to be original instead distanced it from previous Galaxian games, resulting in a niche target audience. Iguchi's experience with developing Pac-Man Championship Edition DX, a well-received update to the original Pac-Man, provided him with a basic idea of how Galaga Legions DX should be designed. The game's design was themed around the word "crush", referring to the destruction of large hordes of enemies in the original. Simplicity was a focal point for the project, as the development team didn't wish to create something too easy it lacked difficulty or something too complex it confused players.

A number of changes were made to the gameplay structure of Legions to accommodate the team's design goals. The level progression system, a linear series of stages in the original Legions, was omitted and instead allows players to select whichever stage they choose. Iguchi didn't enjoy the first game's progression for having only one specific way to clear stage formations, believing the new non-linear structure allowed for variations within each level to accommodate different playstyles: "We want it to be both intuitive and flexible. There shouldn't be one specific way of clearing the game or obtaining a high-score." The controls were also simplified so that players were able to focus on the gameplay.

Among the new design choices for Legions DX was its heavy focus on earning high scores and competing with other players, as the team believed part of the rise in popularity of the shooter genre came from high-score tournaments. Iguchi in particular suggested it would ignite a "competitive spirit" within players, fueling them to compete against others for the highest-score possible on leaderboards. Other additions include improved visuals, reworked enemy patterns, and a slowdown feature that takes effect when the player is about to collide with an enemy. Like Pac-Man Championship Edition DX, the development team hoped to make the game "more exhilarating and satisfying" than before, and to feel like a proper evolution of its arcade game predecessors. The game was described as an "enemy curtain shooter", as the way enemy formations closed in on players resembled the movement of curtains. Composer Akihiko Ishikawa, whose works include Ninja Assault and The Idolmaster series, scored the soundtrack.

== Release ==
Namco Bandai Games teased Galaga Legions DX on November 16, 2010. The company revealed that the game would be the second title released under its Namco Generations series of classic game updates, which included Pac-Man Championship Edition DX and the later-cancelled Aero-Cross. Namco Bandai released a teaser trailer in April 2011, where it announced the game would coincide with the 30th anniversary of the original Galaga. A playable demo was demonstrated at E3 2011.

Galaga Legions DX was released for the Xbox 360 on June 29, 2011 worldwide through the Xbox Live Arcade service. The PlayStation 3 version was released for the PlayStation Network on August 3, 2011 in North America and Japan, and on August 10 in Europe. To commemorate its release, an update for both Taiko no Tatsujin 14 and Taiko no Tatsujin Plus included one of the game's songs, "Doom Noiz", as a playable track. A version for Windows Phone was released on September 4, 2012, which uses touch-screen thumbsticks for movement. On April 27, 2016, the Xbox 360 version of Galaga Legions DX was re-released through Xbox One's backwards comparability lineup.

== Reception ==
Reception

Aggregate score
Aggregator	Score
Metacritic	74/100

Review scores
Publication	Score
Destructoid	8/10
Game Informer	8.5/10
GameSpot	8/10
GamesRadar+	3.5/5
IGN	6.5/10
Push Square	7/10
Retro Gamer	82%

By the end of 2011, Galaga Legions DX sold 19,755 units on the Xbox 360, significantly less than its predecessor. The game itself was received favorably, holding a 74/100 on the review aggregator website Metacritic.

David Wolinsky of GamesRadar+ praised it for being more approachable than to the original Legions, saying that it was much faster and it made the player "feel like a badass" while destroying large waves of enemies. He concluded by stating the game is a "mighty fine diversion worth sinking your teeth into." James Stephanie Sterling of Destructoid said the game appealed to both hardcore and casual fans for its addictive gameplay and content, heavily praising the game's puzzle-solving techniques, easy approach and graphics. Carolyn Petit of GameSpot called it "a worthy bearer of the Galaga title", applauding the game's lowered difficulty, graphical style and addictive gameplay. Daemon Hatfield of IGN praised its graphics and selectable game skins, and for its strategy-based gameplay, while Sammy Barker of Push Square applauded the "fantastic" presentation and its "risk-and-reward" mechanic.

Despite its praise, many would argue the game was not as refined as its predecessor and still lacked in content. Hatfield was the most critical, saying that the game's content left with little to offer for its price point, expressing disappointment towards its lack of replay value and for bearing little resemblance to the original Galaga. He went on to say the game was not much of an improvement over the first Galaga Legions and that only one playthrough showed off all it has to offer. Barker stated it was not as refined as Pac-Man Championship Edition DX and disliked its large emphasis on pattern memorization, saying that it led to repetition, while Wolinsky criticized the game's lack of extra content. Sterling suggested that the game could have used more gameplay modes and longer levels, feeling it has room for improvement.
