= Micro Power =

British video game publisher

- Company type: Computer software, Video game developer, publisher and retailer
- Industry: Computer software, video games
- Headquarters: Leeds, United Kingdom
- Products: Killer Gorilla, Felix in the Factory, Cybertron Mission, Castle Quest, Imogen

Micro Power was a British company established in the early 1980s by former accountant Bob Simpson. The company was best known as a video game publisher, originally under the name Program Power. It also sold many types of computer hardware and software (both its own and third-party) through its Leeds showroom or via mail order.

== Games ==
From 1980 to 1987 the company published a number of video games and other software for various home computers. The earliest programs were released for the Acorn Atom but Micro Power is best remembered for its games for that machine's successor, Acorn's BBC Micro (with all but two of its post-Atom games running on that machine). A large selection of games that could be (and weren't considered 'too old') were ported to the Acorn Electron after its release in 1983 and most new games were now released for these 2 machines in 1984. A few were also ported to other 8-bit platforms including Commodore 64, Amstrad CPC and ZX Spectrum but these never achieved the success of the Acorn originals.

Most of these were basic single screen games, typically arcade clones (see the list of notable games below). While mostly well received and popular at the time (especially on the Acorn platforms), by the mid 1980s, video games were becoming increasingly complex. While simple early arcade-style games still sold well, it was usually at a budget price. Micro Power themselves released two Micro Power Magic compilations in 1986 and 1987, each featuring ten of their games that had previously sold at up to £7.95 each (some only two years earlier), for £7.95.

From 1985 onwards, Micro Power began to produce a few advanced games as opposed to a high quantity of simpler games. The first of these was the arcade adventure Castle Quest (BBC only) by Tony Sothcott, billed as "Probably the most challenging game ever devised for the BBC Micro". This game was successful and a sequel was started which became Doctor Who and the Mines of Terror (BBC, C64, CPC), a huge arcade adventure that required its own ROM chip to run on the BBC Micro. Another later release was puzzle/platform game Imogen (BBC only, later ported to Electron by Superior Software and more recently remade for PC) by Michael St. Aubyn which was noted for its witty, original puzzles and cute high-resolution monochrome graphics.

There were also two 32-bit games, Chess 3D and Zelanites the Onslaught (a Space Invaders clone) for the Acorn Archimedes, released in 1991.

Notable earlier games include:

Typical cover image. The majority of Program Power / Micro Power software was released in uniform covers. This is the Electron version of Cybertron Mission

- Adventure – a text adventure (Atom, BBC, Electron)
- Alien Destroyers – a Space Invaders clone (BBC only)
- Bandits at 3 O'Clock – a 2-player World War II dogfight (BBC, Electron)
- Block Buster – a Q*bert clone (BBC only)
- Bumble Bee – a Lady Bug clone (BBC, Electron, C64)
- Cabman – an overhead view taxi driving game (Spectrum only)
- Cowboy Shootout – a Boot Hill clone (Atom, BBC, Spectrum)
- Croaker – a Frogger clone (BBC, Electron)
- Cybertron Mission – a Berzerk clone (BBC, Electron, C64)
- Danger UXB – a Check Man clone (BBC, Electron)
- Dune Rider – a Moon Patrol clone (BBC only)
- Electron Invaders – a Space Invaders clone (Electron only)
- Escape from Moonbase Alpha – a graphic adventure (BBC, Electron)
- Felix and the Fruit Monsters – a Pac-Man style overhead maze game (BBC, Electron)
- Felix in the Factory – a platform game (BBC, Electron, C64, Memotech MTX)
- Felix Meets the Evil Weevils – a platform game (BBC, Electron)
- Frenzy – a Qix clone (BBC, Electron, C64)
- Galactic Commander – a Lunar Lander clone (BBC, Electron)
- Gauntlet – a Defender clone (BBC, Electron, CPC)
- Ghouls – a platform game with Pac-Man-like characters (BBC, Electron, C64, CPC)
- Hell Driver – an overhead view driving game (BBC only)
- Intergalactic Trader – a text-based space trading game (BBC, Electron)
- Invasion Force – a Space Invaders clone (Atom only)
- Jet Power Jack - a platform game (BBC, Electron, C64)
- Killer Gorilla – a Donkey Kong clone (BBC, Electron, CPC)
- Laser Command – a Missile Command clone (BBC only)
- The Mine – a Dig Dug clone (BBC, Electron)
- Mr. Ee! – a Mr. Do! clone (BBC only)
- Moon Raider – a Scramble clone (BBC, Electron)
- Nemesis – a Centipede clone (BBC only)
- Plutonium Plunder – a Pengo-style overhead maze game (BBC only)
- Positron – a fast-paced Space Invaders style shoot 'em up (BBC, Electron)
- Rubble Trouble – a Pengo-style overhead maze game (BBC, Electron)
- Starfleet Encounter – a text-based strategy game for 2-8 players (BBC only)
- Stock Car – an overhead view racing game (BBC, Electron, C64)
- Swag – a 2-player arcade game involving bank robbery (BBC, Electron)
- Swoop – a Galaxian clone (BBC, Electron, C64)
- Zarm – a Lunar Rescue clone (BBC only)

== Educational / Utility Software ==
As well as games, Micro Power released a number of educational programs (covering subjects such as science and geography) as well as utility software such as the Draw art package (BBC, Electron), Basic Extensions and Constellation astronomy program (Atom, BBC, later ported to Electron by Superior Software).

== Hardware ==
Micro Power also released hardware such as the 'Micro Power Add-On' for the ZX Spectrum which added 2 joystick ports and 3-channel sound capability.

== Leeds Store ==
Micro Power had a store on the corner of North Street and Meanwood Road in Leeds. They primarily sold Acorn hardware and software. Also they sold software for other computers including C64, ZX Spectrum, and QL. In the 1990s Micro Power downsized and moved further up Meanwood Road to reduce outgoings.

There is still the original Micro Power sign at the back of their first premises.
