= Adventure (1982 video game) =

- Acorn Electron cassette cover
- Publisher: Micro Power
- Platforms: Acorn Atom, Acorn Electron, BBC Micro
- Release: 1982: Acorn Atom; 1983: Electron, BBC Micro
- Genre: Text adventure
- Mode: Single-player

Adventure is a video game published in the UK by Micro Power. It was released on the Acorn Atom in 1982 and on the Acorn Electron and BBC Micro in 1983.

== Gameplay ==
The game is a text adventure, being an attempted reconstruction of the original Adventure computer game, although it is not very faithful to the original mainframe version.

In-game screenshot (Acorn Electron)

In this version of the game, the player must rescue a princess from the Magic Caverns. There are over a hundred different locations and many problems must be solved in order to achieve this goal. The game supports one or two word commands and the most useful commands are available via function key shortcuts e.g. INVENTORY, CHECK SCORE etc.

The game's instructions do not reveal all valid verbs, as it is left to the player to discover them. The instructions also mention that the Arabian Nights folk tales may provide useful hints to the player.

The Acorn Atom version of the game requires 12K of RAM and is unrelated to another Acorn Atom title (a text adventure game engine), also called Adventure from Acornsoft.
