= Swoop (video game) =

1983 video game

- Acorn Electron cassette cover
- Publisher(s): Micro Power
- Programmer(s): David Elliot
- Platform(s): BBC Micro, Acorn Electron, Commodore 64
- Release: 1983: BBC, Electron; 1984: C64
- Genre(s): Fixed shooter
- Mode(s): Single-player

Swoop is a clone of Namco's Galaxian programmed by David Elliot for the BBC Micro and published in the UK by Micro Power. It was ported to the Acorn Electron the game's launch in 1983 and the Commodore 64 in 1984.

== Gameplay ==
Aliens in formation with one diving toward the player's ship (BBC Micro)

The invading aliens take the form of wing-flapping Birdmen. Swoop differs from other Galaxian clones in that the Birdmen will lay explosive eggs if they successfully reach the bottom of the screen. If the eggs are touched by the player's laser base then a life is lost, so they effectively confine the movement of the laser base until they disappear after some pre-set time.

There are a total of eight levels (called "phases" in the cassette inlay instructions), each successively more difficult than the last. The most difficult level has a total of two Birdmen and eight missiles raining down on the player simultaneously.
