= Pac-Man Championship Edition 2 =

2016 maze video game

- Developer: Bandai Namco Studios
- Publisher: Bandai Namco Entertainment
- Director: Tadashi Iguchi
- Composer: Hiroyuki Kawada
- Series: Pac-Man
- Engine: Unity
- Platforms: PlayStation 4 Windows; Xbox One; Nintendo Switch
- Release: PS4, Windows, Xbox One: WW: September 15, 2016; Nintendo Switch: WW: February 22, 2018
- Genre: Maze
- Modes: Single-player, Multiplayer (Plus)

Pac-Man Championship Edition 2 (Note: Japanese: パックマンチャンピオンシップエディション2, Hepburn: Pakkuman Chanpionshippu Edishon Tsu) is a maze arcade game developed by Bandai Namco Studios and published by Bandai Namco Entertainment. An installment in the Pac-Man series, it was released for PlayStation 4, Windows, and Xbox One on September 15, 2016; an updated version featuring an exclusive 2-player co-op mode, Pac-Man Championship Edition 2 Plus, was released for Nintendo Switch on February 22, 2018. It is a direct sequel to Pac-Man Championship Edition and the follow-up of Pac-Man Championship Edition DX+. The game was offered for free by Bandai Namco at the beginning of the COVID-19 pandemic to promote staying at home.

== Gameplay ==
Pac-Man being pursued by ghosts while eating Pac-Dots

Pac-Man Championship Edition 2 builds upon the gameplay introduced in Championship Edition and Championship Edition DX+, which added faster gameplay to the traditional Pac-Man formula. Taking control of Pac-Man, players go through various mazes collecting pellets while avoiding the roaming ghosts. Gathering enough pellets will either reveal a bonus item that sends Pac-Man to the next maze or a Power Pellet that can be used to eat ghosts. Unlike previous iterations of Pac-Man, in which touching ghosts would instantly kill Pac-Man, ghosts can now be bumped into up to three times in succession before they enter an Angry state, during which touching them will cause Pac-Man to lose a life. Similar to Championship DX, passing by sleeping ghosts will add them to a trail behind the other ghosts, allowing for large point bonuses when eaten. Players can also use jump pads to jump over parts of a maze and bombs to instantly return to the start of a maze. The game features two main modes: Score Attack, in which players must try and rack up a high score within a time limit, and Adventure, which requires players to clear several objectives, including fighting giant bosses. The Nintendo Switch 'Plus' version also features a co-op mode known as "Pac-Man Championship Edition 2 Plus 2P". Player 1 will play as a yellow Pac-Man, while Player 2 plays as a turquoise Pac-Man, and still following the same rules, Players 1 and 2 need to eat fruit together to get to the next maze. When a player gets caught by a ghost, the other will have a few seconds to save said player from losing a life. When there are only a few minutes left, a giant ghost will break the stage, putting both players in a bigger maze where they can jump around. While eating Power Pellets in this scenario, the players need to bump the giant ghost until they explode, letting them eat the fruit to get to the next stage.

== Reception ==
Reception

Aggregate scores
Aggregator	Score
Metacritic	PC: 78/100; PS4: 77/100; XONE: 77/100; NS: 80/100
OpenCritic	61% recommend

Review scores
Publication	Score
Destructoid	7.5/10
Game Informer	9.25/10
GameRevolution	3.5/5
GameSpot	8/10
Hardcore Gamer	4/5
Nintendo Life	9/10
Shacknews	8/10
Kill Screen	40/100

Pac-Man Championship Edition 2 received "generally favorable" reviews from critics according to Metacritic. Fellow review aggregator OpenCritic assessed that the game received strong approval, being recommended by 61% of critics.

== Re-releases ==
=== Pac-Man Championship Edition 2 + Arcade Game Series ===
A retail disc for PlayStation 4 and Xbox One containing Pac-Man Championship Edition 2 compiled with three games from the Arcade Game Series (Pac-Man, Galaga, and Dig Dug) was released for PlayStation 4 and Xbox One on November 1, 2016 in North America.

=== Namco Museum Arcade Pac ===
Namco Museum Arcade Pac is a retail video game compilation for Nintendo Switch that includes Pac-Man Championship Edition 2 Plus along with select games included in Namco Museum for Nintendo Switch.
