= Qix Adventure =

1999 video game

- Developer: Coconuts Japan Entertainment
- Publishers: Taito, Evolution Entertainment
- Platform: Game Boy Color
- Release: JP: 22 October 1999; UK: 15 December 2000
- Genres: Action, Puzzle
- Modes: Single-player, Multiplayer

Qix Adventure is a 1999 video game developed by Coconuts Japan Entertainment and published by Taito for the Game Boy Color. An English port was developed by Evolution Entertainment for the United Kingdom in 2000. It is a puzzle game based on the 1981 Taito title Qix, with additional story elements.

== Gameplay ==
Image of Qix Adventure.

Similar to Qix, Qix Adventure is a puzzle game in which the player draws a line to enclose areas of the screen. The objective is to enclose 75% of the screen as the space fills with boxes, while avoiding enemies, Qix and Sparx, that interfere with the player's progress. The game features three modes. In 'Treasure' mode, the game requires the player to capture enemies by boxing them in and claiming the treasures they leave behind, providing additional opponents, bonus items and score multipliers. In this mode, the player can also view collected treasure and use them to decorate a room. 'Original' mode follows the rules of Qix. 'Battle' mode allows two players with one Game Pak or a Game Link Cable to compete against each other.

== Development ==
Qix Adventure was showcased by Natsume Inc. at E3 in 2000 and 2001. The game experienced development and manufacturing issues that delayed release of the title in some locations to 2001.

== Reception ==
Reception

Review scores
Publication	Score
Game Boy Official Magazine	79%
Pocket Gamer	B

Qix Adventure received mediocre reviews. Pocket Gamer said the game was "addictive as ever", and "solid fun and easy to learn and play", praising "the adventure mode (as) a great addition". Game Boy Official Magazine stated that the game "doesn't look the most exciting", but were "pleasantly surprised by how addictive (the game) is".
