= Stock Car (video game) =

1984 video game

- Acorn Electron cassette cover
- Developer: A. W. Halse
- Publisher: Micro Power
- Platforms: Acorn Electron, BBC Micro, Commodore 64
- Release: 1984
- Genre: Racing
- Modes: Single-player, multiplayer

Stock Car is an overhead-view racing video game written by A. W. Halse and published in the UK by Micro Power. It was released in 1984 for the BBC Micro, Acorn Electron, and Commodore 64 computers. Although the cassette inlay gives the release date as 1984, some sources state the release date as 1983, and the game is also known as Stock Car Racer.

Stock Car is similar to Atari, Inc.'s Sprint 2 arcade game (1976) and Indy 500 for the Atari VCS (1977).

== Gameplay ==
In-game screenshot (Acorn Electron)

The game provides a top-down view of one of six user-selectable racing tracks. One or two human players in red cars compete against yellow computer-controlled cars. Oil slicks can be added which cause the cars to veer off-course, making the game more challenging. The amount of skidding can also be selected by the player. A race consists of anything between 1 and 40 laps.

Players can steer their car left and right, but unlike most racing games, there are no keys for directly braking or accelerating. Instead, the player drives by selecting one of four gears (or neutral) and the car will accelerate according to the currently selected gear.

== Reception ==
Tom Bowker describes the game as "primitive", but he "loved it deeply".

The game was reviewed in the August 1984 edition of Acorn User and later briefly mentioned in issue of Electron User as part of the ten-game Micro Power Magic compilation, where it was described as "very realistic".

== Legacy ==
Another game, Grand Prix by S. Merrigan on the Triple Deckers volume 1 compilation was described by Dave Reeder as "a very poor copy of Stock Car".
