= Qix =

1981 video game

- North American arcade flyer
- Developer: Taito (Note: Game Boy version developed by Minakuchi Engineering; NES version developed by Novotrade International.)
- Publisher: Taito: Atari 8-bit, 5200 Atari, Inc. Lynx Atari Corporation Game Boy Nintendo
- Designers: Randy Pfeiffer; Sandy Pfeiffer
- Series: Qix
- Platform: Arcade: Atari 8-bit, Atari 5200, Commodore 64, FM-7, Amiga, Apple II, MS-DOS, Game Boy, Apple IIGS, NES, Atari Lynx, mobile phone
- Release: October 1981: Arcade; NA: October 1981; JP/UK: November 1981; AU: January 1982 Atari 8-bit; February 1983 5200; March 1983 C64; 1983 FM-7; JP: 1983 Amiga; August 1989 Apple II; October 1989 MS-DOS; 1989 Game Boy; JP: April 13, 1990; NA: May 1990; EU: September 28, 1990 Apple IIGS; 1990 NES; NA: January 1991 Lynx; 1991
- Genre: Puzzle
- Modes: Single-player, multiplayer

Qix (Note: Japanese: クイックス, Hepburn: Kuikkusu) (/ˈkɪks/ KIKS (Note: As seen on the North American promotional flyer.)) is a 1981 puzzle video game developed and published by Taito for arcades. Designed by husband and wife team Randy and Sandy Pfeiffer, Qix is one of a handful of games made by Taito's American division (another is Zoo Keeper). At the start of each level, the playing field is a large, empty rectangle, containing the Qix, an abstract stick-like entity that performs graceful but unpredictable motions within the confines of the rectangle. The objective is to draw lines that close off parts of the rectangle to fill in a set amount of the playfield.

Qix was ported to the contemporary Atari 5200 (1982), Atari 8-bit computers (1983), and Commodore 64 (1983), then was brought to a wide variety of systems in the late 1980s and early 1990s: MS-DOS (1989), Amiga (1989), another version for the C64 (1989), Apple IIGS (1990), Game Boy (1990), Nintendo Entertainment System (1991), and Atari Lynx (1991).

Multiple home and arcade sequels followed and the concept was widely cloned. In the Gals Panic series from Kaneko, each captured area is not filled with a color, but reveals part of an image of a woman; this itself has been cloned into erotic-oriented games based on the concept of Qix.

== Gameplay ==
57% of the screen captured, mostly with Fast Draw (blue). The Qix is just below the center, and the player's marker above and to the left. One Sparx is directly below the marker, another above on the right side of the map.

Controls consist of a four-direction joystick and two buttons: "Slow Draw" and "Fast Draw".

The player controls a diamond-shaped marker that initially moves along the edges of the playfield. Holding down one of the draw buttons allows the marker to draw a line (Stix) in unclaimed territory in an attempt to create a closed shape. Once an area is captured, it is filled with color and points are awarded based on the area claimed and drawing speed. Areas captured entirely with Slow Draw (orange-red in the screenshot) are worth double. The titular Qix is a colorful geometric figure in constant and random motion. The Qix will not actively seek out the marker, and it will not harm the marker if it collides with it while the marker is traversing the edge of the playfield or of any captured area. However, if the Qix collides with the marker as it is drawing a Stix before a new area is captured (or it touches the exposed Stix), one life is lost.

The marker cannot cross or backtrack along the line being drawn. If the marker stops while drawing, a fuse appears and burns along the line toward the marker; if it reaches the marker, the player loses one life. The fuse disappears once the marker is moved. If the player draws into a position where it cannot proceed any further, the fuse is triggered. The attract mode calls this a "Spiral Death Trap".

Sparx are enemies that traverse all playfield edges except unfinished Stix. A life is lost if one hits the marker. A meter at the top of the screen counts down to the release of additional Sparx and the mutation of all Sparx into Super Sparx, which can chase the marker along uncompleted Stix.

To complete a level, the player must claim a 75% percentage of the playfield (adjustable to be between 50% and 90%). If a level is completed by exceeding the minimum area percentage, a bonus is awarded for every 1% beyond the threshold.

Starting in level three, the player faces two Qixes. Splitting the playfield into two regions, each containing one Qix, ends the level. No immediate bonus is awarded for this, but a bonus multiplier is applied to the scoring in all subsequent levels. This multiplier starts at one before the first time that the Qix are split and increases by one for every additional splitting of the Qix, to a maximum of nine. Levels also add additional Sparx and the eventual appearance of only Super Sparx.

== Reception ==
Reception

Review scores
Publication	Score
AllGame	4/5
Electronic Fun	4/4

Upon release, Qix was a commercial hit. In 1983, Electronic Games reported that the game exceeded Taito's expectations, quickly rising to being one of the most popular titles of the year. The magazine attributes the game's success to it being unlike any other game at the time, specifically for its unique premise and gameplay mechanics. A year after its debut, its popularity declined and the game became largely forgotten. Keith Egging, Taito's "Director of Creativity", told Electronic Games: "Qix was conceptually too mystifying for gamers. [...] It was impossible to master and once the novelty wore off, the game faded". In Japan, it was the fifth highest-grossing arcade game of 1981. The game has since been dubbed a sleeper hit.

Qix and its home conversions have received largely positive reviews. The game was praised for its original concept and ideas, and has been described as a cultural phenomenon. Video, which reviewed the Atari 5200 release, applauded its gameplay and bizarre yet interesting premise. They reported similar reactions from players, who enjoyed its mechanics and gameplay. Video staff described the game as being a "cult phenomenon loved by a few and ignored by" more hardcore gamers. The home computer versions of Qix were praised by Russel Sipe of Computer Gaming World for its fascinating gameplay and for welcoming newcomers. In How to Beat the Video Games Michael Blanchet said that 'Qix is probably the most complicated video game to emerge in years, yet its simplicity is beautiful. I think of it as electronic real estate. [...] Qix is a state of the art "Etch a Sketch."'

Retrospective coverage of Qix has also been positive. AllGame's Brett Alan Weiss commended Qix for its addictive gameplay, technological accomplishments, and responsive controls. While he believed the graphics and sound effects were overly simplistic and crude, he said the game as a whole is "abstract minimalism at its videogame best". Retro Gamer staff enjoyed Qix particularly for its addictive nature. They also compared its concept to that of the Etch A Sketch, a mechanical toy that allowed its user to draw straight lines across a small screen. The staff believed the game's simplicity was also one of its strong points, alongside its sound effects for being satisfying to hear.

=== Accolades ===
At the 5th annual Arkie Awards in 1984, Qix received the Certificate of Merit in the category of "1984 Best Videogame Audio-Visual Effects (16K or more ROM)". In 1995, Flux ranked the game 94th on their "Top 100 Video Games." In 1997, the staff at Electronic Gaming Monthly listed the Nintendo Entertainment System version at #100 on their "100 Best Games of All Time" for its risk-versus-reward system and scoring. The Killer List of Videogames listed it as #27 in their "Top 100 Video Games" list.

== Legacy ==
=== Sequels ===
Qix II: Tournament (1982) is a version of the original Qix with a new color scheme and which awards an extra life when 90% or more of the screen is enclosed. Super Qix (developed by Kaneko) was released in 1987. The 1989 arcade video game Volfied, also known as Ultimate Qix (Genesis) or Qix Neo (PlayStation), was also released on several mobile phones. Another sequel, Twin Qix, reached a prototype stage in 1995, but was never commercially released.

A port to the Game Boy developed by Minakuchi Engineering and published by Nintendo was released in 1990, with intermissions in which Mario, Luigi and Princess Peach have cameo appearances. In one, Mario is seen in a desert wearing Mexican clothing and playing a guitar with a vulture looking on. The outfit later appears as a costume that Mario can wear in Super Mario Odyssey. The Game Boy port was released as a Nintendo 3DS Virtual Console title in Japan on June 15, 2011, and in North America and Europe on July 7.

In 1999, a remake for the Game Boy Color was released called Qix Adventure. The player travels on a map screen, taking on opponents which appear on the playing field. Although optional, enclosing an opponent in the box opens a treasure chest, which can also be enclosed, giving the player an item. Battle Qix was released for the PlayStation in 2002 by Success, under their Super 1500 Lite budget title series. It includes a remake of the original Qix alongside a competitive multiplayer mode. Taito released a new version of Qix for the Xbox Live Arcade and PlayStation Portable Qix++ in December 2009.

=== Clones ===
- Fill 'Er Up (1983, Atari 8-bit, ANALOG Computing)
- Stix (1983, Commodore 64)
- Styx (1983, IBM PC, Windmill Software)
- Frenzy (1984, Acorn Electron and BBC Micro, Micro Power)
- Xonix (1984, MS-DOS)
- Qiks (1984, Tandy Color Computer, Spectral Associates)
- Quix (1984, Tandy Color Computer, Tom Mix Software)
- Torch 2081 (1986, Amiga, Digital Concepts)
- Zolyx (1987, Commodore 64, C16/Plus-4, Amstrad CPC, and ZX Spectrum, Firebird)
- Maniax (1988, Atari ST, Amiga, Kingsoft)
- Trix (1988, Amiga, G. Hales)
- Gals Panic (1990, arcade, Kaneko), which started a subgenre of adult-themed "uncover the image" games.
- JezzBall (1992, Windows, Microsoft)
- Cacoma Knight in Bizyland (1992-1993, Super NES/Famicom, Datam Polystar/Seta USA)
- Dancing Eyes (1996, arcade, Namco), a 3D version of the eroge subgenre, similar to Gals Panic
- Prometheus/Qrax (1997, Mac, Quarter Note Software)
- iSlash (2010, iOS, Duello)
- Qyx (2022, Atari 2600, Champ Games)

In 2011, Den of Geek included Qix on a list of the top 10 most cloned video games.
