= Dancing Eyes =

1996 video game

- Promotional flyer
- Developer: Namco
- Publisher: Namco
- Designer: Masateru Umeda
- Platform: Arcade
- Release: JP: September 1996
- Genre: Puzzle
- Modes: Single-player, multiplayer
- Arcade system: Namco System 11

Dancing Eyes (Note: Japanese: ダンシングアイ, Hepburn: Danshingu Ai) is a 1996 puzzle video game developed and published by Namco for arcades. It features gameplay reminiscent of arcade games like Qix – players control a monkey named Urusu-San as he must complete each level by destroying all of the tiles off the grid of a 3D object. Most levels revolve around the player slowly removing the clothing from women, alongside destroying cobras, UFOs, and cardboard boxes. There are enemies that must be avoided, and there are also power-ups that grant different abilities. The game runs on the Namco System 11 hardware.

Created by Masateru Umeda, the designer for Namco's The Outfoxies, Dancing Eyes has gained notoriety for its sexual nature and comical design. Its characters were animated using motion capture, many of whom were voiced by well-known figures in the anime industry. Namco executives were skeptical of the game during production, as it broke away from the company's traditional family-friendly model. The game was openly disliked by publications in its initial release, who viewed it as "inappropriate" for arcades. Retrospectively, it has been praised for its quirky characters and fun gameplay, often being compared to the aforementioned Qix or the similarly suggestive Gals Panic. A remake was announced for the PlayStation 3 under the Namco Generations series, but was cancelled.

== Gameplay ==
Gameplay of Dancing Eyes

Dancing Eyes is a 3D puzzle game, with gameplay often compared to Qix (1981). The player controls a monkey named Urusu-San, who must complete each level by eliminating all tiles off the grid of a 3D object. In most cases, the level involves the player destroying the clothing off of women, though some other levels revolve around destroying UFOs, cardboard boxes, and a cobra around a trapped body builder. Enemies will appear and give direct chase to the player, which must be avoided or will cost the player a life. There are also power-ups that appear that give Urusu-San different abilities, such as a speed boost or the ability to increase in size. Completing a level allows the player to briefly round whatever object was in the level as it poses for the camera.

== Development and release ==
Dancing Eyes was created by Masateru Umeda and a team of six others within Namco. Umeda is best known as the designer of The Outfoxies, a 1995 fighting game that is seen as a predecessor to the Super Smash Bros. series. Dancing Eyes was programmed for the Namco System 11 board, a 3D arcade system based on PlayStation hardware. The production team used motion capture to animate the game's characters, several of whom were voiced by prominent voice actors within the anime industry. Each of the characters were given their own personality and backstory so they would not be memorable for just their sex appeal. One of the characters, "Bunny", was modeled after one of the developer's gym instructor. Due to Dancing Eyes being a drastic departure from their usual family-friendly image, Namco executives were unsure about the project during development. The game was published in Japan in September 1996. Promotional material acknowledged the strange concept and characters.

== Reception and legacy ==
Reception

Review score
Publication	Score
Player One	91%

The arcade game magazine Game Machine reported that Dancing Eyes was among the most popular arcade games during the month of October 1996.

Retrospectively, the game has gained attention for its risque, comical nature. Writing for GamePro, Ray Barnholt likened its gameplay to Taito's Qix and Kaneko's Gals Panic series, finding it to be fun and one that doesn't take itself seriously. He also complemented the graphics for being impressive at the time, as well as for it not solely relying on its suggestive themes. Barnholt wrote: "Despite the groan-worthy sexism going on, Dancing Eyes doesn't really take itself seriously. It shows that if you take out the suggestive material, you can still have a fairly fun game on your hands." Arttu Ylärakkola of GameSetWatch described it as "a perfect example of the kind of Japanese arcade weirdness that gets giggles from anyone who's ever seen the game". He stated that the game itself was of low quality, but had an odd charm to it through its bizarre premise and simplistic gameplay. Retro Gamer compared it to Konami's Amidar, commenting on its strange, sexual theme and "nutty" concept. They said that it was a "surprisingly polished" game, with good gameplay and responsive controls. Retro Gamer also found the lack of a PlayStation conversion surprising, given the arcade system was based on PlayStation hardware.

In 2011, Namco Bandai Games announced that a high-definition remaster of Dancing Eyes was in production for the PlayStation 3 as part of their Namco Generations line of modernized arcade game remakes. Although it was announced as being exclusive to Japan, English translations options hinted at a possibility of it seeing an international release. It was also compatible with the PlayStation Move motion-based peripheral. The announcement generated confusion and distaste from several publications, who commented on the game's sexual appeal and bizarre premise. The company became quiet about the project for over a year, until it was announced as being cancelled in 2012 for "various circumstances". Push Square believes the game's controversy was a factor in its cancellation.
