= Killer Gorilla =

1983 video game

- Publisher: Micro Power
- Designer: Adrian Stephens
- Platforms: BBC Micro, Acorn Electron, Amstrad CPC
- Release: 1983
- Genre: Platform
- Mode: Single-player

Killer Gorilla is a Donkey Kong clone written by Adrian Stephens and published by Micro Power for the BBC Micro in 1983. It was ported to the Acorn Electron and Amstrad CPC computers in 1984.

Stephens wrote Killer Gorilla at the age of 17 after buying a magazine with screenshots of Donkey Kong. He was paid 400 pounds for the game. Stephens wrote two other games for Micro Power: Escape From Moonbase Alpha and Mr EE, a clone of Universal's Mr. Do!.

== Gameplay ==
Screenshot of the 75m level (BBC Micro)

The game involves controlling a man to reach a fair-haired heiress trapped by a large gorilla at the top of the screen. It is made up of four levels, set higher and higher up a construction site – 25 m, 50 m, 75 m and 100 m.

There are two hammers on the 25 m, 50 m and 100 m levels, with none on the 75 m level. Hammers last for about 10 seconds, as measured by the amount of bonus that ticks away. The players cannot climb ladders or jump gaps when holding the hammer.

After completing the four levels, the player returns to the 25 m level and the game repeats, getting progressively faster and with more barrels, custard pies, and fireballs. In addition, the girders on the 25 m level acquire more holes.

An extra life is awarded when the player completes the 75 m level for the first time.

The character is controlled using Z for left, X for right, and return to jump.

== Legacy ==
The game appeared on a number of compilations including 10 Computer Hits (1985), Micropower Magic 2 (1986) and Superior Software's highly regarded Play It Again Sam 3 (1988). PIAS 3 also included a game called Killer Gorilla 2 but this was actually a re-titled early Superior Software game. Based on Donkey Kong Junior and originally released as Zany Kong Junior in 1984, it was soon withdrawn after complaints from Atarisoft, who owned the home computer rights to the original game. Ironically, Atarisoft had commissioned Adrian Stephens to officially port Donkey Kong Junior to the BBC Micro after seeing Killer Gorilla, but the game was never released as Atarisoft decided to abandon the BBC platform.
