= Pac-Man Championship Edition DX =

2010 video game

- Developers: Mine Loader Software; Namco Bandai Games
- Publisher: Namco Bandai Games
- Directors: Tadashi Iguchi; Tomoko Iura; Ryoko Yabuchi
- Producers: Kunito Komori; Junichiro Hosokawa; Kang Tian Hao
- Programmer: Mao Yi Ying
- Artists: Makoto Ando; Li Chun Liang
- Composers: Hiroshi Okubo; Hiroyuki Kawada; Junko Ozawa
- Series: Pac-Man
- Platforms: PlayStation 3, Xbox 360, Windows Phone, Windows, iOS, Android
- Release: PlayStation 3, Xbox 360; November 17, 2010; Windows Phone; May 18, 2011; Windows; September 24, 2013 iOS & Android; July 23, 2015
- Genre: Maze
- Mode: Single-player

Pac-Man Championship Edition DX (Note: Japanese: パックマン チャンピオンシップ エディション DX, Hepburn: Pakkuman Chanpionshippu Edishon DX) is a 2010 maze video game developed by Chinese studio Mine Loader Software and published by Namco Bandai Games for the Xbox 360 and PlayStation 3, later ported to Steam, Android and iOS. It is the sequel to the 2007 game Pac-Man Championship Edition, which was the last game developed by series creator Toru Iwatani. The player controls Pac-Man as he must eat all of the dots in the maze while avoiding colored ghosts that pursue him. A bonus item will appear once the player has eaten all dots on one side of the maze, causing the layout to change. Several additions were made over the original, such as bombs that send all ghosts to the regeneration box and sleeping ghosts that will give chase when Pac-Man moves past them.

The development team wanted the game to focus on the excitement of fleeing from ghosts, and to appeal towards a more casual audience. Early prototypes experimented with increasing the number of power pellets and ghosts, leading to the sleeping ghost and "ghost train" mechanics being added. The neon art-style was inspired by the fluorescent lights used in early LCD handheld games, and was intended to help make DX stand out among other games. It was the first game released under the Namco Generations label, used for remakes of older Namco video games.

Upon release, Pac-Man Championship Edition DX was met with critical acclaim, many calling it one of the best Pac-Man games ever made and one of the greatest video game remakes of all time. Critics applauded the game's addictive nature, replay value, intense gameplay and electronic soundtrack, and for being a vast improvement over the original. Some publications would give the game perfect scores. A 2013 update renamed it to Pac-Man Championship Edition DX+, adding several new mazes and gamemodes including a skin based on the original Pac-Man arcade game. An indirect sequel, Pac-Man Championship Edition 2, was released in 2016.

== Gameplay ==
Screenshot from the PC version. Pac-Man being pursued by a ghost train.

Pac-Man Championship Edition DX builds upon the gameplay of Pac-Man Championship Edition. Players control Pac-Man as he travels through a maze collecting dots and avoiding ghosts, which can be eaten by collecting power pellets. Collecting all the dots on one side of the maze makes a fruit appear on the other side, which adds a new layout of dots on that side and so on. The game's speed increases as the player gets more points and drops when the player loses a life. DX introduces a new type of ghost that sleeps in a stationary spot on the maze until Pac-Man moves past it and begins to follow him. By passing several sleeping ghosts, they form a large rainbow-colored trail, dubbed "Ghost Trains" by players, that can offer massive bonus points once Pac-Man is able to get a power pellet and devours them. Some ghosts may also have additional power pellets that can prolong the powered-up state if eaten in time. Getting close enough to the regular ghosts turns them rainbow-colored and they may also be added to the trail. A slow-motion effect automatically kicks in whenever a ghost gets too close to Pac-Man, which offers players the chance to make a last-minute attempt to avoid being caught. Players can also use a limited supply of bombs that return all the ghosts to the center of the maze, although it lowers the dot multiplier and game speed.

Gameplay revolves around three main modes: Score Attack, in which players attempt to get the highest score within five or ten minutes; Time Attack, consisting of several short trials and one long one in which players must obtain a certain amount of fruit as quickly as possible; and Ghost Combo, where players must try to stay powered up and eat as many ghosts as possible. The game features nine courses, which include the original maze from Championship Edition, in which the sleeping ghosts are absent. Players receive a ranking for each game mode per course, which is based on their position on the overall leaderboards. The game has various visual styles, including some in the style of Pac-Mania, which can be mixed and matched. Players may also access a constantly updated NG News feature, which includes articles such as developer interviews, as well as view video replays of the highest-ranking Score Attack players via the leaderboard.

== Release ==
On September 25, 2013, the game received a free update that rebranded it as Pac-Man Championship Edition DX+. The update provided improved leaderboard functionality, the ability to challenge friends, medal support and a new skin based on classic Pac-Man, which can be unlocked by getting all achievements and medals.

In addition to this, paid downloadable content was also released, including four new courses (Big Eater, Championship III, Highway II, and Mountain), three new skins (based on Dig Dug, Rally-X and Pac-Man and the Ghostly Adventures), and two new background music tracks (“Pac-Steps” and “Re-Entrance”). Additionally, players can unlock a Classic skin, with visuals and sounds based on the original Pac-Man by collecting all the medals available in the game. This content is available individually, or in the "All You Can Eat Add-on Pack" bundle for a discounted price.

== Reception ==
Reception

Aggregate score
Aggregator	Score
Metacritic	X360: 93/100; PS3: 91/100; PC: 86/100 iOS: 91/100

Review scores
Publication	Score
1Up.com	A (CE); A (DX)
Eurogamer	10/10
Game Informer	9/10
GameSpot	9.0/10
IGN	10/10
TeamXbox	9.8/10 (DX)
TouchArcade	5/5

Award
Publication	Award
IGN	Best Retro Design of 2010

The Xbox Live Arcade version sold 235,130 units on the Xbox 360, as of 2011. The game has sold 1,102,937 units on Steam, as of July 1, 2018.

The game has received universal praise from critics and gaming websites, and is cited as a big improvement over the original. IGN gave the game a perfect 10/10 and an Editor's Choice award, calling it "a master class in game design." GameSpot gave the game 9.0/10, praising the new elements which make Championship Edition "more thrilling and addictive than ever." 1UP.com gave the game an A rank, calling it "insanely addicting." Eurogamer gave the game 10/10, calling it "a game you'll want to instantly evangelise to anyone with even the vaguest sense of what makes a game good." Destructoid gave the game 9/10, calling it "one of this year's best and purest arcade experiences and definitely a must-buy." Giant Bomb gave it a score of 5/5, saying that the player experiences "sensory overload of the highest order, the kind of game that leaves your eyeballs dry, your nerves shot, and every last bit of you wanting more." Good Game gave it 9.5 out of 10.

The game won IGN's Best of 2010 awards for Most Addictive Game, Best Retro Design and Best Quick Fix. In 2015, Hardcore Gaming listed the game on their 200 Best Video Games of All Time. During the 14th Annual Interactive Achievement Awards, the Academy of Interactive Arts & Sciences nominated Pac-Man Championship Edition DX for "Casual Game of the Year".
