= Castle Quest (1985 video game) =

- Publisher: Micro Power
- Programmer: Tony Sothcott
- Platform: BBC Micro
- Release: WW: 1985
- Genre: Action-adventure
- Mode: Single-player

Castle Quest is an action-adventure game for the BBC Micro, noted at the time of release as being the best game on the platform in its genre for its problem solving, colourful graphics and smooth scrolling.

== Gameplay ==
The jail

The game is set in a wizard's castle, the player's task being to find the treasure. It employs "very smooth" side-scrolling (termed 'Scrollerama') and imperfect vertical scrolling. Play includes climbing ladders, which are sufficiently wide to simplify this aspect of gameplay. Various objects can be found and used to solve problems. These include everyday items, furniture, specialist equipment and valuables. Other characters include guards, animals, a witch and the wizard.

Control is via the keyboard, with 13 keys having various uses, for example accessing the inventory of objects carried in the backpack, viewing off-screen to left/right. Play requires both dexterity and lateral thinking. A saved game facility is not provided.

Scores are awarded based on progression through the game. Upon completion, additional rewards are given for remaining lives and a bonus is awarded according to elapsed time. An expert player may complete the game in "around seven minutes".

== Development ==
The game was reported as being programmer Tony Sothcott's first machine code game. Its colours are achieved using Mode 2, requiring more than half of total available RAM. The map is made up from screens comprising 8 × 7 blocks, there being 13 different types of such block. Two adjacent blocks are stored as a single byte within the map data, which occupies 2 kB in total. This technique was noted for its ingenuity.

=== Marketing ===
The game was marketed as "Probably the most challenging game ever devised for the BBC Micro." The publishers offered small cash prizes to those completing the game within three months of purchase. They also announced a future competition between the four highest scorers, with a prize of computer equipment worth £500. The game's retail price (cassette £12.95, disk £14.95) was noted as being "not cheap" but nevertheless worthy.

Self-styled "marketing expert" Chris Payne (at that time a recent graduate employed by Micro Power as a marketing assistant) recalls his memory of Sothcott's game being "terrific". Micro Power did not commission the marketing from any of their usual agents, instead appointing new agency Kidd's of Leeds. This agency devised a "nicely done logo" on a simple black background.

== Reception ==
The game was listed as a 'star game' in a 1985 review in Personal Computer News (PCN) and was featured in an illustrated double-page spread in the June 1985 issue of Acorn User (AU). PCN Reviewer Bryan Skinner noted that the programmer had developed "something really special", with both publications noting the "clever" use of colourful graphics, but little use of sound, possibly due to lack of available RAM. AU reviewer Bruce Smith noted the hardware scrolling as being the "best ... yet" on the platform. Skinner was of the opinion that Castle Quest was "the best arcade game" on the BBC Micro and would qualify as "the best game" were it not for the existence of Elite. He called for readers to join him in demanding that Micro Power convert the game for the Commodore 64 and ZX Spectrum.

The AU feature was justified (while acknowledging the earlier March review) by the opinion that the game represented a landmark in game development, both on the BBC Micro and other platforms. Micro Power's software development manager Alan Butcher tested and completed the game before release. Marketing assistant Chris Payne recalled that staff predicted the game to be a bestseller.
