= Pac-Man Championship Edition =

2007 video game

- Developer: Namco Bandai Games
- Publisher: Namco Bandai Games
- Director: Tadashi Iguchi
- Producer: Nobutaka Nakajima
- Designer: Toru Iwatani
- Programmers: Takashi Ōtsuka; Yasumichi Onishi; Hideki Harada
- Artists: Masaharu Okada; Hideki Tanaami; Yoshikazu Komatsu
- Composer: Junko Ozawa
- Series: Pac-Man
- Platforms: Xbox 360 iOS; Android; Maemo 5 PlayStation Portable
- Release: Xbox Live Arcade: WW: June 6, 2007; iOS: WW: December 10, 2009; Android: WW: June 8, 2010; PlayStation Portable: EU: December 1, 2010; NA: February 1, 2011
- Genre: Maze
- Mode: Single-player

Pac-Man Championship Edition (Note: Japanese: パックマン チャンピオンシップエディション, Hepburn: Pakkuman Chanpionshippu Edishon) is a 2007 maze video game developed and published by Namco Bandai Games for the Xbox 360. It has since been released on several other platforms, including iOS, Android, and the PlayStation Portable as a PSP mini title available on the PlayStation Store (consequently playable on the PlayStation 3). It is an HD reimagining of Namco's original Pac-Man arcade game; players navigate Pac-Man through an enclosed maze, eating pellets and avoiding four ghosts that pursue him. Clearing an entire side of the maze of dots will cause a fruit item to appear, and eating it will cause a new maze to appear on the opposite side.

Development of Championship Edition was headed by director Tadashi Iguchi, alongside producer Nobutaka Nakajima and designer and the father of Pac-Man, Toru Iwatani, the original creator of Pac-Man — Championship Edition was the final game he designed. Unhappy with earlier attempts to remake Pac-Man for removing many of the common elements present in the original, the development team focused on taking the original concept and expanding on two core features: the game speed and new mazes, which they felt would be the best way to "modernize" it. Iguchi was not much of a Pac-Man fan, spending much of his time thinking about how hardcore Pac-Man fans would react to the game's new features and ideas. It was chosen to make the game feel like an arcade game, due to it being released for the Xbox Live Arcade service.

Backed by a large marketing campaign orchestrated by Microsoft and Namco Bandai, Pac-Man Championship Edition was well-received by critics, becoming one of the greatest games of all time. Publications commended the game for successfully translating the classic Pac-Man gameplay into a modern format, with its gameplay, soundtrack and online features also being praised. One critic labeled it as "the first true sequel to Pac-Man since Ms. Pac-Man". However, some disliked the lack of a multiplayer mode and for reusing enemy movement patterns in the original. It was remade by Chinese studio Mine Loader Software as Pac-Man Championship Edition DX and followed by a sequel, Pac-Man Championship Edition 2.

== Gameplay ==
Pac-Man Championship Edition is similar in basic game play to the original 1980 Pac-Man: players have to eat dots, while avoiding the four ghosts that roam around the maze. Championship Edition, however, also brings many game play differences.

Like the original Pac-Man, the basic game play of Pac-Man Championship Edition consists entirely of navigating Pac-Man through a maze, eating dots, power pellets and bonus items (such as fruits, keys, and other objects), and avoiding the four ghosts that roam the maze as well. If Pac-Man is caught by a ghost, the player loses a life. Eating a power pellet causes the ghosts to turn blue, allowing Pac-Man to eat them and send them back to their home, where they re-emerge in their original form. An extra life is awarded after every 20,000 points earned.

However, there are several major differences from its original counterpart, making Pac-Man C.E. a faster paced game. Each maze is divided into two halves. Eating all the dots on one half causes a bonus item to appear on the other side, and eating the item causes a new maze to appear on the other half. Players can also collect additional power pellets to increase their powered up time and continue earning maximum points for eating ghosts. The game speed increases as the player scores points, and decreases when they lose a life. As opposed to levels, the game is played within a certain time limit, with players attempting to get the highest score possible.

The game features six modes: Championship, which is the basic five-minute mode, two ten-minute Challenge modes which affect the stage (such as increasing power pellet pickups or putting the maze in darkness) and three Extra modes (one five-minute and two ten-minute) featuring different mazes. The game also supports online leader boards.

== Development ==
The idea for the game that later became Pac-Man Championship Edition was conceived following the release of the original Pac-Man arcade game for the Xbox Live Arcade online service in 2006. Namco Bandai Games producer Nobutaka Nakajima noticed how the classic Pac-Man gameplay took place on a tall, vertical screen, in drastic comparison to the widescreen HD television sets most consumers have, alongside its "very low-resolution, old-school gameplay." With next generation video game consoles posing much more powerful hardware, the idea of a modernized remake of Pac-Man for HD televisions came into fruition. Nakajima became the project's producer, assisted by director Tadashi Iguchi and designer Toru Iwatani, the original creator of Pac-Man. Championship Edition was the last game that Iwatani designed. When the game was being idealized, the development team focused on the question: "We have all of this new technology and hardware and power. What would Pac-Man be like, taking this technology and putting it to the max?"

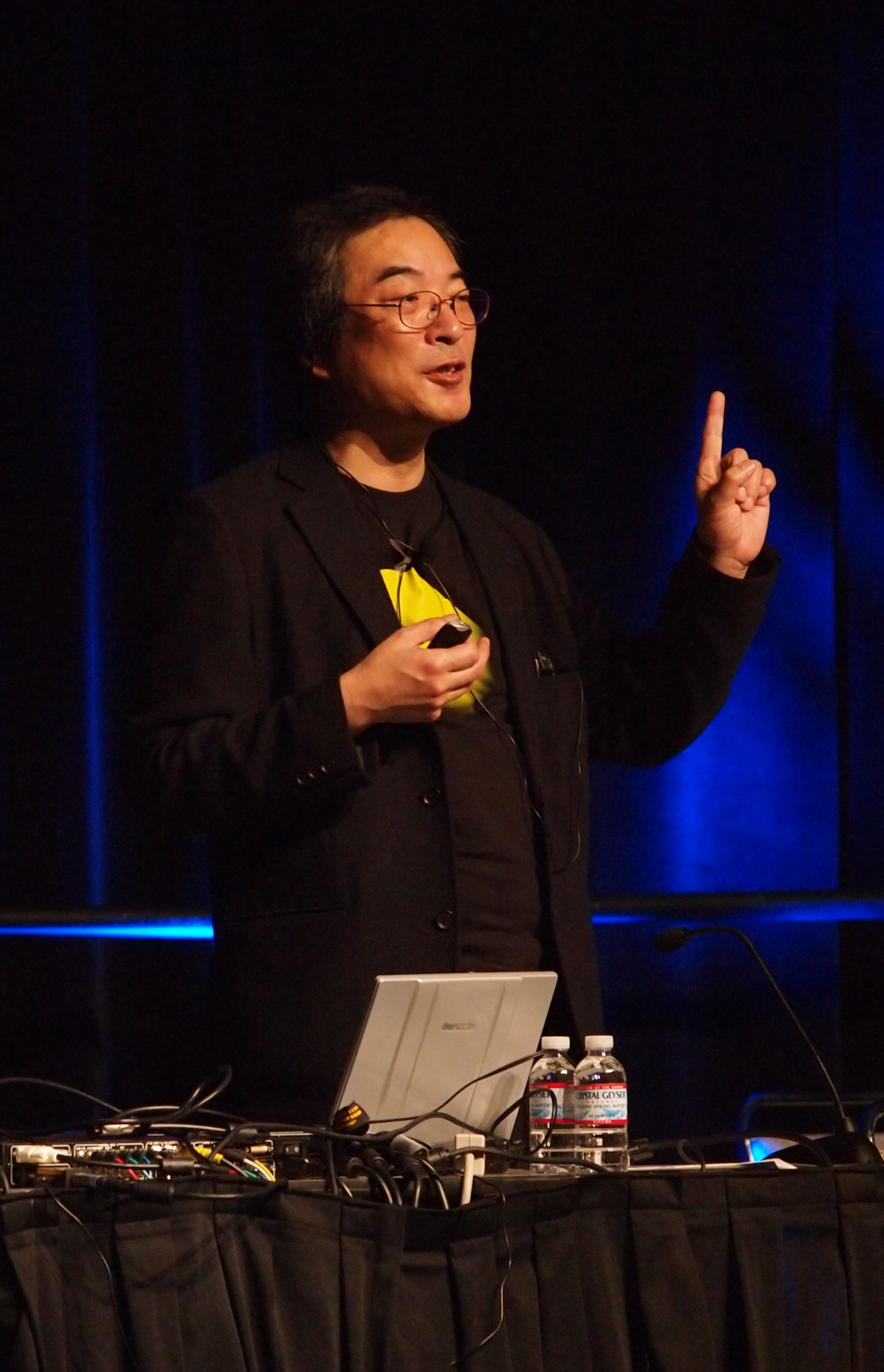
Pac-Man Championship Edition was the final game that series creator Toru Iwatani designed.

Nakajima felt that most remakes and sequels to Pac-Man stray too far from what he considered "the fundamentals of what made Pac-Man so great." With Championship Edition, he went back to the roots of the original to expand on its concept, while still keeping the game's core mechanics intact. Iwatani wanted the game to keep the simplicity of Pac-Man, as he felt that is what made the game fun and compelling. When the development team was discussing with Iwatani about the idea of the game, Namco Bandai was approached by Microsoft about a crossover promotional event centered around Pac-Man; with this in mind, the team focused on making the idea of players playing together a focal point for the game, wanting it to be full of excitement and action.

Iguchi claimed that the original Pac-Man was a success because of its "compelling" gameplay experience, and said that trying to improve on it was a difficult task. A total of twenty different ideas were proposed, only one of which was approved by Iwatani and became the basis for the game. With the original Pac-Man having already been done well in terms of its gameplay and design, Iguchi and the others stated that the only mechanics that could really be changed were the maze design and the speed of the game itself. The staff targeted those ideas specifically during production, and experimented with ways to improve them. When an idea was proposed, it was incorporated into the game and playtested to make sure if it was fun or interesting. Thanks to his background in designing arcade games during his time at Namco, specifically Pac-Man Arrangement for Namco Classic Collection Vol. 2 (1996), Iguchi was able to polish the concept to what he envisioned players wanted out of the arcade original. Microsoft had additional input on the project, requesting that the game have an arcade-like feel to it due to them wanting to release the game onto the Xbox Live Arcade service. The development team also wanted Championship Edition to be appealing towards more "modern" players, those who had never played Pac-Man during its heyday. Ideas such as the game increasing in speed as it progressed were added to draw in newer players. Iguchi was not much of a Pac-Man fan, and had to look at the game from the perspective of a hardcore fan of the franchise while working on it.

== Release ==
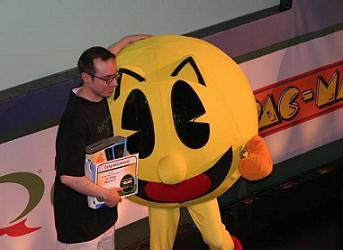
Daniel Borrego, winner of the Pac-Man World Championship, alongside Namco's mascot

The game was originally released on the Xbox Live Arcade service on June 6, 2007. The announcement of the game spurred more purchases of the Xbox 360 in Japan. Pac-Man C.E. is also available on a disc titled Xbox Live Arcade Compilation that is bundled with the Xbox 360 Arcade console bundle, as well as on the compilation package Namco Museum Virtual Arcade (in the latter however, it can't be accessed within NMVA itself; it must be accessed from the game library). Ports for iOS, J2ME, Android and PSP minis were released on December 10, 2009, middle of 2009, June 8, 2010 and December 1, 2010 respectively. The follow-up Pac-Man Championship Edition DX was released on Xbox Live Arcade on November 17, 2010 and PlayStation Network on November 23, 2010. The original Pac-Man Championship Edition was ported to Nintendo 3DS as part of a retail game titled Pac-Man & Galaga Dimensions in 2011. It is included in the downloadable game compilation Pac-Man Museum in 2014, and reappears in Pac-Man Museum+, released in 2022.

On June 5, 2007, the first Pac-Man World Championship was held in New York City, which brought together ten competitors from eight countries to play the new Pac-Man Championship Edition just prior to its release on Xbox Live Arcade. The top two scorers, Robert Glashuettner of Austria and Carlos Daniel Borrego Romero of Mexico, competed for the championship in a single five-minute round. Borrego was named Pac-Man World Champion and won an Xbox 360 console, specially decorated with Pac-Man artwork and signed by Tōru Iwatani. A "demastered" version of Pac-Man Championship Edition that runs on real Famicom/Nintendo Entertainment System hardware is included in the game compilation Namco Museum Archives Vol. 1 and physical editions of the Namcot Collection.

== Reception ==
Reception

Aggregate score
| Aggregator | Score |
|---|---|
| Metacritic | X360: 83/100 iOS: 72/100 |

Review scores
| Publication | Score |
|---|---|
| 1Up.com | A |
| Computer and Video Games | 7/10 |
| Eurogamer | 7/10 |
| GameSpot | 7.9/10 |
| IGN | 8.4/10 |
| TeamXbox | 8.6/10 |
| TouchArcade | 4.5/5 |
| X-Play | 5/5 |

Pac-Man Championship Edition was well-received by video game publications, and is seen among the best games in the Pac-Man series. Critics felt that Namco Bandai successfully brought the core idea of the original into the modern era of video games. Joystiq called it "The first true sequel to Pac-Man since Ms. Pac-Man."

Pac-Man Championship Edition received mostly positive reviews by critics, with reviewers stating the gameplay was "fresh and exciting," "one of the best 'exclusive' pieces of downloadable/casual entertainment available," and that it was "nice to see a classic remade instead of simply repackaged." Jared Rea of Joystiq called it "The first true sequel to Pac-Man since Ms. Pac-Man." Criticisms include a lack of a multiplayer mode, and an apparent relapse to patterns that had been in the original. The game's Metacritic aggregator score is 83. The iOS port was criticised for its microtransaction strategy while the Android port was criticised for poor controls. IGN criticised the PSP mini version due to the absence of online leaderboards and its inferiority to its sequel.
