= List of Namco games =

Namco was a Japanese video game developer and publisher.

Bandai Namco Entertainment is the successor of Namco and continues manufacturing and distributing video games worldwide. For Namco games released following the 2006 merger with Bandai's video game division, see List of Bandai Namco video games. For a list of franchises owned by Bandai Namco, see List of Bandai Namco video game franchises.

== Arcade-based games ==
Namco initially distributed its games in Japan, while relying on third-party companies, such as Atari and Midway Manufacturing to publish them internationally under their own brands. Later, it would handle its own publishing worldwide.

=== Electro-mechanical games ===
| Title | Release date | JP | NA | PAL | Notes |
|---|---|---|---|---|---|
| Periscope | 1965 | Yes | Yes | Yes | Electro-mechanical (EM) game released by Sega internationally in 1966. |
| F-1 | October 1976 | Yes | Yes | No | Released by Atari in North America, in November 1976. |
| Shoot Away | 1977 | Yes | Yes | Yes | Projection light gun shooter (skeet shooting) game. |
| Clay Champ | 1978 | Yes | | | Japan's ninth-highest-grossing EM arcade game of 1978. |
| Submarine | 1978 | Yes | Yes | No | Released by Midway in North America, in September 1979. |
| Pitch In | 1980 | Yes | | Yes | An arcade baseball game incorporating a pitching machine. It was among Japan's top ten highest-grossing arcade games of 1980. |
| Sweet Licks | April 1981 | Yes | Yes | Yes | |
| Pic Pac | November 1984 | Yes | | | Features musical robot band. A video game version Robot Band PicPac is included in Namco Museum Vol. 4 (1996). |
| Sweet Land | June 1987 | Yes | | | |
| Gator Panic | February 1988 | Yes | Yes | | |
| Flamin' Finger | 2003 | No | Yes | No | Featured an LED playfield. |

=== Namco proprietary arcade systems ===
| Title | Arcade Systems/Consoles | Release date | JP | NA | PAL | Notes |
|---|---|---|---|---|---|---|
| Gee Bee | Namco 8080-based | October 1978 | Yes | Yes | No | Namco's first independently released video game. |
| Bomb Bee | Namco 8080-based | June 1979 | Yes | No | No | Sequel to Gee Bee. |
| Galaxian | Namco Galaxian | September 15, 1979 | Yes | Yes | Yes | Namco's first shoot 'em up game. |
| Galaxian | MSX | January 30, 1984 | Yes | No | No | Namco's first shoot 'em up game. |
| Galaxian | Famicom | September 7, 1984 | Yes | No | No | Namco's first shoot 'em up game. |
| Galaxian | Famicom Disk System | July 20, 1990 | Yes | No | No | Namco's first shoot 'em up game. |
| Galaxian | Mobile | June 13, 2003 | No | Yes | No | Namco's first shoot 'em up game. |
| SOS | Namco 8080-based | October 1979 | Yes | No | No | |
| Cutie Q | Namco 8080-based | November 1979 | Yes | No | No | Second sequel to Gee Bee. |
| Rally-X | Namco Rally-X | January 1980 | Yes | Yes | Yes | First Namco game to feature background music and a bonus round. |
| Rally-X | MSX | March 30, 1984 | Yes | No | No | First Namco game to feature background music and a bonus round. |
| Navarone | Namco 8080-based | February 1980 | Yes | No | No | |
| Kaitei Takara Sagashi | Namco 8080-based | May 1980 | Yes | No | No | Created by K'K Tokki as a prototype. |
| Pac-Man | Namco Pac-Man | July 1980 (Note: Location-tested on May 22) | Yes | Yes | Yes | Namco's best-selling arcade game of all time. Three Pac-Man games by Midway also use the Namco Pac-Man hardware - Ms. Pac-Man (2/3/1982), Pac-Man Plus (3/13/1982), and Jr. Pac-Man (8/13/1983). The rights to Ms. Pac-Man were later turned over to Namco. |
| Pac-Man | MSX | January 17, 1984 | Yes | No | No | Namco's best-selling arcade game of all time. Three Pac-Man games by Midway also use the Namco Pac-Man hardware - Ms. Pac-Man (2/3/1982), Pac-Man Plus (3/13/1982), and Jr. Pac-Man (8/13/1983). The rights to Ms. Pac-Man were later turned over to Namco. |
| Pac-Man | Famicom/NES | November 2, 1984 | Yes | Yes | Yes | Namco's best-selling arcade game of all time. Three Pac-Man games by Midway also use the Namco Pac-Man hardware - Ms. Pac-Man (2/3/1982), Pac-Man Plus (3/13/1982), and Jr. Pac-Man (8/13/1983). The rights to Ms. Pac-Man were later turned over to Namco. |
| Pac-Man | Famicom Disk System | May 18, 1990 | Yes | No | No | Namco's best-selling arcade game of all time. Three Pac-Man games by Midway also use the Namco Pac-Man hardware - Ms. Pac-Man (2/3/1982), Pac-Man Plus (3/13/1982), and Jr. Pac-Man (8/13/1983). The rights to Ms. Pac-Man were later turned over to Namco. |
| Pac-Man | Game Boy | November 16, 1990 | Yes | Yes | Yes | Namco's best-selling arcade game of all time. Three Pac-Man games by Midway also use the Namco Pac-Man hardware - Ms. Pac-Man (2/3/1982), Pac-Man Plus (3/13/1982), and Jr. Pac-Man (8/13/1983). The rights to Ms. Pac-Man were later turned over to Namco. |
| Pac-Man | Game Gear | January 29, 1991 | Yes | Yes | No | Namco's best-selling arcade game of all time. Three Pac-Man games by Midway also use the Namco Pac-Man hardware - Ms. Pac-Man (2/3/1982), Pac-Man Plus (3/13/1982), and Jr. Pac-Man (8/13/1983). The rights to Ms. Pac-Man were later turned over to Namco. |
| Pac-Man | Neo Geo Pocket Color | July 31, 1999 | Yes | Yes | Yes | Namco's best-selling arcade game of all time. Three Pac-Man games by Midway also use the Namco Pac-Man hardware - Ms. Pac-Man (2/3/1982), Pac-Man Plus (3/13/1982), and Jr. Pac-Man (8/13/1983). The rights to Ms. Pac-Man were later turned over to Namco. |
| Pac-Man | Game Boy Color | August 1999 | No | Yes | Yes | Renamed Pac-Man: Special Color Edition |
| Pac-Man | Mobile | June 13, 2003 | No | Yes | No | |
| Pac-Man | Game Boy Advance | February 14, 2004 | Yes | Yes | Yes | |
| King & Balloon | Namco Galaxian | June 1980 | Yes | Yes | Yes | First Namco game to feature synthesized voices. |
| King & Balloon | MSX | February 28, 1984 | Yes | No | No | First Namco game to feature synthesized voices. |
| Tank Battalion | Custom | October 1980 | Yes | Yes | No | |
| Tank Battalion | MSX | August 30, 1984 | Yes | No | No | |
| New Rally-X | Namco Rally-X | February 1981 | Yes | Yes | No | Sequel to Rally-X. |
| Warp & Warp | Namco 8080-based | July 1981 | Yes | Yes | No | Released as Warp Warp by Rock-Ola in the U.S. |
| Warp & Warp | MSX | February 18, 1984 | Yes | No | No | Released as Warp Warp by Rock-Ola in the U.S. |
| Galaga | Namco Galaga | September 1981 | Yes | Yes | Yes | Sequel to Galaxian. NES version sub-titled Demons of Death in North America. |
| Galaga | MSX | May 29, 1984 | Yes | No | No | Sequel to Galaxian. NES version sub-titled Demons of Death in North America. |
| Galaga | Famicom | February 15, 1985 | Yes | Yes | Yes | Sequel to Galaxian. NES version sub-titled Demons of Death in North America. |
| Galaga | Famicom Disk System | June 22, 1990 | Yes | No | No | Sequel to Galaxian. NES version sub-titled Demons of Death in North America. |
| Galaga | Mobile | September 20, 2004 | No | Yes | No | Sequel to Galaxian. NES version sub-titled Demons of Death in North America. |
| Bosconian | Namco Galaga | November 20, 1981 | Yes | Yes | Yes | First Namco game to have a continue feature. |
| Bosconian | MSX | July 13, 1984 | Yes | No | No | First Namco game to have a continue feature. |
| Dig Dug | Namco Galaga | February 20, 1982 | Yes | Yes | Yes | |
| Dig Dug | MSX | May 24, 1984 | Yes | No | No | |
| Dig Dug | Famicom | June 4, 1985 | Yes | No | No | |
| Dig Dug | Famicom Disk System | July 22, 1990 | Yes | No | No | |
| Dig Dug | Game Boy | September 1992 | No | Yes | Yes | Developed by Now Production. |
| Dig Dug | Game Boy Advance | May 21, 2004 | Yes | No | No | |
| Dig Dug | Mobile | February 8, 2005 | No | Yes | No | |
| Pole Position | Namco Pole Position | July 1982 | Yes | Yes | No | First Namco game to feature 16-bit graphics |
| Super Pac-Man | Namco Super Pac-Man | August 11, 1982 | Yes | Yes | No | Official sequel to Pac-Man. |
| Xevious | Namco Galaga | December 10, 1982 | Yes | Yes | Yes | One of Namco's earliest vertical scrolling shoot 'em up titles. NES version subtitled The Avenger in North America. |
| Xevious | Famicom | November 8, 1984 | Yes | Yes | Yes | One of Namco's earliest vertical scrolling shoot 'em up titles. NES version subtitled The Avenger in North America. |
| Xevious | Famicom Disk System | May 18, 1990 | Yes | No | No | One of Namco's earliest vertical scrolling shoot 'em up titles. NES version subtitled The Avenger in North America. |
| Xevious | Game Boy Advance | February 14, 2004 | Yes | Yes | Yes | One of Namco's earliest vertical scrolling shoot 'em up titles. NES version subtitled The Avenger in North America. |
| Xevious | Mobile | March 9, 2005 | No | Yes | No | One of Namco's earliest vertical scrolling shoot 'em up titles. NES version subtitled The Avenger in North America. |
| Mappy | Namco Mappy | March 20, 1983 | Yes | Yes | No | First Namco game to have a storyline. |
| Mappy | MSX | November 13, 1984 | Yes | No | No | First Namco game to have a storyline. |
| Mappy | Famicom | November 14, 1984 | Yes | No | No | First Namco game to have a storyline. |
| Mappy | Game Gear | May 24, 1991 | Yes | No | No | First Namco game to have a storyline. |
| Mappy | Game Boy Advance | February 14, 2004 | Yes | No | No | First Namco game to have a storyline. |
| Pac & Pal | Namco Super Pac-Man | July 30, 1983 | Yes | No | No | Also Known As "Pac-Man & Chomp Chomp", replacing Pal with Chomp Chomp from Hanna-Barbera's Pac-Man Cartoon, but limited to a run of 300 machines produced for several European countries. The game was never released in The United States as it was a failure at the arcades. |
| Phozon | Namco Phozon | August 1983 | Yes | No | No | |
| Libble Rabble | Namco System 16 Universal | October 1983 | Yes | No | No | |
| Libble Rabble | Super Famicom | September 22, 1994 | Yes | No | No | |
| Pole Position II | Namco Pole Position | December 1983 | Yes | Yes | No | Sequel to Pole Position. |
| Gaplus | Namco Phozon | April 1984 | Yes | Yes | No | Released in the United States as Galaga 3. |
| The Tower of Druaga | Namco Mappy | June 1984 | Yes | No | No | First Namco game to have an ending instead of continuing indefinitely, looping, or ending in a kill screen |
| The Tower of Druaga | Famicom | August 6, 1985 | Yes | No | No | First Namco game to have an ending instead of continuing indefinitely, looping, or ending in a kill screen |
| The Tower of Druaga | MSX | October 26, 1986 | Yes | No | No | First Namco game to have an ending instead of continuing indefinitely, looping, or ending in a kill screen |
| The Tower of Druaga | PC Engine | June 25, 1992 | Yes | No | No | Developed by Game Studio. |
| The Tower of Druaga | GameCube | December 5, 2003 | Yes | No | No | |
| Pac-Land | Namco Pac-Land | August 1984 | Yes | Yes | No | Namco's first side-scrolling platformer. Themed around Hanna-Barbera's Pac-Man television series. Background music is the television series' theme song. |
| Pac-Land | Famicom | November 21, 1985 | Yes | No | No | Namco's first side-scrolling platformer. Themed around Hanna-Barbera's Pac-Man television series. Background music is the television series' theme song. |
| Pac-Land | PC Engine | June 1, 1989 | Yes | No | No | Namco's first side-scrolling platformer. Themed around Hanna-Barbera's Pac-Man television series. Background music is the television series' theme song. |
| Grobda | Namco Super Pac-Man | November 1, 1984 | Yes | No | No | Spin-off of Xevious. |
| Super Xevious | Namco Galaga | 1984 | Yes | No | No | First sequel to Xevious. |
| Dragon Buster | Namco Pac-Land | December 20, 1984 | Yes | No | No | First Namco game to have a health bar. |
| Dragon Buster | Famicom | January 7, 1987 | Yes | No | No | First Namco game to have a health bar. |
| Dragon Buster | MSX | December 18, 1987 | Yes | No | No | First Namco game to have a health bar. |
| Dig Dug II | Namco Mappy | March 12, 1985 | Yes | No | No | Sequel to Dig Dug. NES version sub-titled Trouble in Paradise in North America. |
| Dig Dug II | Famicom | April 18, 1986 | Yes | Yes | No | Sequel to Dig Dug. NES version sub-titled Trouble in Paradise in North America. |
| Dig Dug II | Famicom Disk System | August 31, 1990 | Yes | No | No | Sequel to Dig Dug. NES version sub-titled Trouble in Paradise in North America. |
| Metro-Cross | Namco Pac-Land | May 1985 | Yes | Yes | Yes | |
| Metro-Cross | Famicom | December 16, 1986 | Yes | No | No | Developed by Now Production. |
| Baraduke | Namco Pac-Land | July 1985 | Yes | Yes | No | Also known as Alien Sector in the United States and Distributed by Midway. |
| Motos | Namco Mappy | September 20, 1985 | Yes | No | No | |
| Sky Kid | Namco Pac-Land | December 1, 1985 | Yes | Yes | No | First Namco game to allow two players on the screen simultaneously. It was NAMCO's final game to be licensed to Midway for U.S. Distribution before NAMCO chose Atari Games to be their Official U.S. Licensee. |
| Sky Kid | Famicom | August 22, 1986 | Yes | Yes | No | First Namco game to allow two players on the screen simultaneously. It was NAMCO's final game to be licensed to Midway for U.S. Distribution before NAMCO chose Atari Games to be their Official U.S. Licensee. |
| Toy Pop | Namco System 16 Universal | April 1986 | Yes | No | No | |
| Sky Kid Deluxe | Namco System 86 | February 1986 | Yes | No | No | Sequel to Sky Kid. |
| Hopping Mappy | Namco System 86 | March 1986 | Yes | No | No | Sequel to Mappy. |
| The Return of Ishtar | Namco System 86 | July 8, 1986 | Yes | No | No | Sequel to The Tower of Druaga. |
| The Return of Ishtar | MSX | September 21, 1988 | Yes | No | No | Sequel to The Tower of Druaga. |
| Thunder Ceptor | Namco Thunder Ceptor | July 1986 | Yes | No | No | |
| Genpei Tōma Den | Namco System 86 | October 1, 1986 | Yes | No | No | |
| Genpei Tōma Den | PC Engine | March 16, 1990 | Yes | No | No | |
| 3-D Thunder Ceptor II | Namco Thunder Ceptor | December 1986 | Yes | No | No | Sequel to Thunder Ceptor. |
| Rolling Thunder | Namco System 86 | December 1986 | Yes | Yes | No | Licensed to Atari Games for U.S. Distribution. |
| Rolling Thunder | Famicom | March 17, 1989 | Yes | No | No | |
| Wonder Momo | Namco System 86 | February 24, 1987 | Yes | No | No | Namco's last 8-bit arcade game. |
| Wonder Momo | PC Engine | April 21, 1989 | Yes | No | No | |
| Wonder Momo | Mobile | June 1, 2005 | Yes | No | No | |
| Yokai Dochuki | Namco System 1 | April 1987 | Yes | No | No | Namco's first 16-bit arcade game. |
| Yokai Dochuki | PC Engine | February 5, 1988 | Yes | No | No | Developed by TOSE. |
| Yokai Dochuki | Famicom | June 24, 1988 | Yes | No | No | Developed by Now Production. |
| Dragon Spirit | Namco System 1 | June 20, 1987 | Yes | Yes | No | Licensed to Atari Games for U.S. Distribution. |
| Dragon Spirit | PC Engine | December 26, 1988 | Yes | No | No | Developed by TOSE. |
| Blazer | Namco System 1 | July 1987 | Yes | No | No | |
| Quester | Namco System 1 | September 1987 | Yes | No | No | Namco's answer to Taito's Arkanoid |
| Pac-Mania | Namco System 1 | November 30, 1987 | Yes | Yes | No | 3D remake of Pac-Man. Last Pac-Man arcade title until 1996. Licensed to Atari Games for U.S. Distribution. |
| Pac-Mania | MSX | March 27, 1989 | Yes | No | No | 3D remake of Pac-Man. Last Pac-Man arcade title until 1996. Licensed to Atari Games for U.S. Distribution. |
| Pac-Mania | Mobile | May 27, 2005 | No | Yes | No | 3D remake of Pac-Man. Last Pac-Man arcade title until 1996. Licensed to Atari Games for U.S. Distribution. |
| Galaga '88 | Namco System 1 | December 1987 | Yes | Yes | No | Remake of Galaga. Licensed to Atari Games for U.S. Distribution. |
| Galaga '88 | PC Engine | July 15, 1988 | Yes | No | No | Called Galaga '90 in North America and Distributed by NEC Home Electronics. |
| Galaga '88 | Game Gear | October 25, 1991 | Yes | No | Yes | Released as Galaga '91. |
| Final Lap | Namco System 2 | December 1987 | Yes | Yes | No | First Namco game to allow multiple cabinets to be linked together. Licensed to Atari Games for U.S. Distribution. |
| Final Lap | Famicom | August 12, 1988 | Yes | No | No | Developed by Arc System Works. |
| World Stadium | Namco System 1 | March 1988 | Yes | No | No | |
| Assault | Namco System 2 | April 1988 | Yes | Yes | No | Licensed to Atari Games for U.S. Distribution. |
| Bravoman | Namco System 1 | May 20, 1988 | Yes | No | No | Also known as Bravoman or Beraboh Man. |
| Bravoman | PC Engine | July 13, 1990 | Yes | No | No | Developed by Now Production. |
| Märchen Maze | Namco System 1 | July 1988 | Yes | No | No | Developed by N.H. System. Released outside Japan as Alice in Wonderland. |
| Märchen Maze | PC Engine | December 11, 1990 | Yes | No | No | Developed by N.H. System. |
| Baraduke II | Namco System 1 | August 1988 | Yes | No | No | Sequel to Baraduke. The actual name of the game is Bakutotsu Kijūtei. |
| Ordyne | Namco System 2 | September 1988 | Yes | No | No | |
| Ordyne | PC Engine | September 8, 1989 | Yes | No | No | |
| Metal Hawk | Namco System 2 | September 1988 | Yes | No | No | |
| World Court | Namco System 1 | October 1988 | Yes | No | No | |
| Splatterhouse | Namco System 1 | November 1988 | Yes | No | No | One of the first ultra-violent games. |
| Splatterhouse | PC Engine | April 3, 1990 | Yes | No | No | One of the first ultra-violent games. |
| Mirai Ninja | Namco System 2 | November 1988 | Yes | No | No | |
| Phelios | Namco System 2 | December 1988 | Yes | No | No | |
| Phelios | Mega Drive | July 20, 1990 | Yes | Yes | Yes | |
| Face Off | Namco System 1 | December 1988 | Yes | No | No | |
| Winning Run | Namco System 21 | December 1988 | Yes | No | No | |
| Rompers | Namco System 1 | February 1989 | Yes | No | No | |
| Blast Off | Namco System 1 | March 1989 | Yes | No | No | Sequel to Bosconian. |
| Valkyrie No Densetsu | Namco System 2 | April 1989 | Yes | No | No | Sequel to Valkyrie no Boken. |
| Valkyrie No Densetsu | PC Engine | April 3, 1990 | Yes | No | No | Developed by Tose. |
| Dirt Fox | Namco System 2 | June 1989 | Yes | No | No | |
| Finest Hour | Namco System 2 | September 1989 | Yes | No | No | |
| Burning Force | Namco System 2 | November 1989 | Yes | No | No | |
| Burning Force | Mega Drive | October 19, 1990 | Yes | Yes | Yes | Developed by Nova Games. |
| Four Trax | Namco System 2 | November 1989 | Yes | Yes | No | |
| Dangerous Seed | Namco System 1 | December 1989 | Yes | No | No | |
| Dangerous Seed | Mega Drive | December 18, 1990 | Yes | No | No | Developed by TOSE. |
| Marvel Land | Namco System 2 | December 1989 | Yes | No | No | |
| Marvel Land | Mega Drive | June 28, 1991 | Yes | Yes | Yes | Developed by TOSE. Also known as Talmit's Adventure. |
| World Stadium '89 | Namco System 1 | 1989 | Yes | No | No | |
| Winning Run Suzuka GP | Namco System 21 | 1989 | Yes | No | No | First sequel to Winning Run. Features real-life Japanese circuit Suzuka. |
| Galaxian 3 | Namco System 21 | April 1, 1990 | Yes | Yes | No | A theme park attraction game supporting up to 28 players. Also known as Galaxian³: Project Dragoon. |
| Kyuukai Douchuuki | Namco System 2 | May 1990 | Yes | No | No | Spin-off of Yokai Dochuki. |
| Kyuukai Douchuuki | Mega Drive | July 12, 1991 | Yes | No | No | Spin-off of Yokai Dochuki. |
| Final Lap 2 | Namco System 2 | August 1990 | Yes | Yes | No | First sequel to Final Lap. |
| Pistol Daimyo no Bouken | Namco System 1 | October 1990 | Yes | No | No | Spin-off of Chozetsu Rinjin: Bravoman. |
| Steel Gunner | Namco System 2 | October 3, 1990 | Yes | No | No | |
| Sokoban Deluxe | Namco System 1 | November 1990 | Yes | No | No | Known outside Japan as Boxy Boy. Developed by Thinking Rabbit. |
| Dragon Saber | Namco System 2 | December 10, 1990 | Yes | Yes | No | Sequel to Dragon Spirit. Called with the subtitle "After Story of Dragon Spirit" in Japan. |
| Dragon Saber | PC Engine | December 27, 1991 | Yes | No | No | Developed by Now Production. |
| Rolling Thunder 2 | Namco System 2 | December 1990 | Yes | No | No | Sequel to Rolling Thunder. |
| Rolling Thunder 2 | Mega Drive | November 18, 1991 | Yes | Yes | Yes | Sequel to Rolling Thunder. |
| Puzzle Club | Namco System 1 | 1990 | Yes | No | No | Unreleased prototype. |
| World Stadium '90 | Namco System 1 | 1990 | Yes | No | No | |
| Super World Stadium | Namco System 2 | January 1991 | Yes | No | No | |
| Driver's Eyes | Namco System 21 | February 1991 | Yes | No | No | Features a three-screen panoramic view. |
| DS-5000 Driving Simulator | Namco System 21 | 1991 | Yes | Unknown | Unknown | Co-developed with Mitsubishi. It was a serious educational street driving simulator that used 3D polygon technology and a sit-down arcade cabinet to simulate realistic driving, including basics such as ensuring the car is in neutral or parking position, starting the engine, placing the car into gear, releasing the hand-brake, and then driving. The player can choose from three routes while following instructions, avoiding collisions with other vehicles or pedestrians, and waiting at traffic lights; the brakes are accurately simulated, with the car creeping forward after taking the foot off the brake until the hand-brake is applied. Leisure Line magazine considered it the "hit of the show" upon its debut at the 1991 JAMMA show. It was designed for use by Japanese driving schools, with a very expensive cost of AU$150,000 or US$117,000 (equivalent to $288,000 in 2025) per unit. Followed-up by the System22-based DS-6000 simulator. |
| Golly! Ghost! | Namco System 2 | July 1991 | Yes | No | No | Electro-mechanical/video game hybrid. |
| Starblade | Namco System 21 | September 1991 | Yes | Yes | No | |
| Starblade | Mega CD | October 28, 1994 | Yes | Yes | No | |
| Tank Force | Namco System 1 | December 1991 | Yes | No | No | Sequel to Tank Battalion and Battle City. |
| Steel Gunner 2 | Namco System 2 | March 9, 1992 | Yes | No | No | Sequel to Steel Gunner. |
| Cosmo Gang the Video | Namco System 2 | March 18, 1992 | Yes | No | No | Features characters from a redemption game titled Cosmo Gangs. |
| Cosmo Gang the Video | Super Famicom | October 29, 1992 | Yes | No | No | |
| Solvalou | Namco System 21 | December 1991 | Yes | No | No | 3D Spin-off of Xevious. |
| Winning Run '91 | Namco System 21 | 1991 | Yes | No | No | Second sequel to Winning Run. |
| Bubble Trouble: Golly! Ghost! 2 | Namco System 2 | 1992 | Yes | No | No | Sequel to Golly! Ghost!. |
| Bakuretsu Quiz Ma-Q Dai Bōken | Namco NA-1 | July 1992 | Yes | No | No | |
| Final Lap 3 | Namco System 2 | September 1992 | Yes | No | No | Second sequel to Final Lap. |
| Suzuka 8 Hours | Namco System 2 | October 10, 1992 | Yes | Yes | No | Released as Coca-Cola Suzuka 8 Hours in The United States with a license from the Atlanta, GA based soft drink company. |
| Suzuka 8 Hours | Super Famicom/SNES | October 15, 1993 | Yes | Yes | No | Developed by Arc System Works. |
| F/A | Namco NA-1 | October 1992 | Yes | No | No | Known as Fighter & Attacker in North America. |
| Cosmo Gang the Puzzle | Namco NA-1 | November 1992 | Yes | No | No | Sequel to Cosmo Gang the Video. |
| Cosmo Gang the Puzzle | Super Famicom | February 26, 1993 | Yes | No | No | Sequel to Cosmo Gang the Video. The game received a brand-new facelift outside Japan becoming the famous Pac-Attack. |
| Exvania | Namco NA-1 | December 1992 | Yes | No | No | |
| Lucky & Wild | Namco System 2 | December 1992 | Yes | Yes | Yes | |
| Super World Court | Namco NA-1 | December 1992 | Yes | No | No | Sequel to Pro Tennis: World Court. |
| Knuckle Heads | Namco NA-2 | December 1992 | Yes | No | No | |
| Super World Stadium '92 | Namco System 2 | 1992 | Yes | No | No | |
| Sim Drive | Namco System 22 | 1992 | Yes | No | No | Unreleased racing game. |
| Air Combat | Namco System 21 | February 1993 | Yes | Yes | Yes | |
| Galaxian³: Project Dragoon | Namco System 21 | March 1993 | Yes | Yes | No | Six-player arcade version of Galaxian³ developed for Namco's "Theater 6" system. |
| Cyber Sled | Namco System 21 | March 27, 1993 | Yes | Yes | Yes | |
| Cyber Sled | PlayStation | January 27, 1995 | Yes | Yes | No | |
| Emeraldia | Namco NA-1 | July 1993 | Yes | No | No | |
| Emeraldia | Namco NA-2 | July 1993 | Yes | No | No | |
| Nettou! Gekitou! Quiztou!! | Namco NA-2 | September 1993 | Yes | No | No | |
| Numan Athletics | Namco NA-2 | September 1993 | Yes | No | No | |
| Ridge Racer | Namco System 22 | October 30, 1993 | Yes | Yes | Yes | |
| Ridge Racer | PlayStation | December 3, 1994 | Yes | No | No | Release title for the PlayStation. |
| Suzuka 8 Hours 2 | Namco System 2 | November 1993 | Yes | No | No | Sequel to Suzuka 8 Hours. |
| Great Sluggers | Namco NB-1 | November 1993 | Yes | No | No | |
| Final Lap R | Namco System FL | December 1993 | Yes | No | No | Third sequel to Final Lap. |
| Tinkle Pit | Namco NA-1 | December 1993 | Yes | No | No | Features cameos from several of the company's characters. |
| Super World Stadium '93 | Namco System 2 | 1993 | Yes | No | No | |
| X-Day | Namco NA-1 | 1993 | Yes | No | No | |
| Magic Edge Hornet 1 | Namco Magic Edge Hornet Simulator | 1993 | Yes | No | No | |
| Magic Edge F18 | Namco Magic Edge Hornet Simulator | 1993 | Yes | No | No | |
| Magic Edge X21 | Namco Magic Edge Hornet Simulator | 1993 | Yes | No | No | |
| NebulasRay | Namco NB-1 | March 1994 | Yes | No | No | |
| Great Sluggers '94 | Namco NB-1 | June 1994 | Yes | No | No | Sequel to Great Sluggers. |
| Ridge Racer 2 | Namco System 22 | July 8, 1994 | Yes | Yes | No | First sequel to Ridge Racer. |
| Alpine Racer | Namco System 22 | September 11, 1994 | Yes | Yes | No | |
| J-League Soccer V-Shoot | Namco NB-1 | September 1994 | Yes | No | No | |
| Point Blank | Namco NB-1 | October 1994 | Yes | Yes | Yes | Light gun game. Known as Gun Bullet in Japan. |
| Point Blank | PlayStation | August 7, 1997 | Yes | Yes | No | Light gun game. Known as Gun Bullet in Japan. |
| Ace Driver | Namco System 22 | November 1994 | Yes | Yes | Yes | |
| Attack of the Zolgear | Namco System 21 | 1994 | Yes | Yes | No | Sequel to Galaxian 3; a conversion kit for the "Theater 6" system. |
| Cyber Commando | Namco System 22 | 1994 | Yes | No | No | Sequel to Cyber Sled. |
| Mach Breakers | Namco NB-2 | January 1995 | Yes | No | No | Sequel to Numan Athletics. |
| Air Combat 22 | Namco Super System 22 | March 1995 | Yes | No | No | Sequel to Air Combat; "22" is a reference to the Namco Super System 22 hardware it was released on. |
| The Outfoxies | Namco NB-2 | March 1995 | Yes | No | No | |
| Rave Racer | Namco System 22 | July 16, 1995 | Yes | No | No | Second sequel to Ridge Racer. |
| Super World Stadium '95 | Namco NB-1 | July 1995 | Yes | No | No | |
| Speed Racer | Namco System FL | October 7, 1995 | No | Yes | No | |
| Namco Classic Collection Vol. 1 | Namco ND-1 | November 1995 | Yes | Yes | Yes | Included original and "arranged" versions of Galaga, Xevious and Mappy. |
| Ace Driver: Victory Lap | Namco System 22 | December 1995 | Yes | No | No | First sequel to Ace Driver. |
| Dirt Dash | Namco Super System 22 | December 1995 | Yes | No | No | An off-road racing game. |
| Time Crisis | Namco Super System 22 | December 1995 | Yes | Yes | Yes | Light gun game. |
| Time Crisis | PlayStation | June 27, 1997 | Yes | Yes | No | Light gun game. |
| Cyber Cycles | Namco Super System 22 | 1995 | Yes | No | No | |
| Namco Classic Collection Vol. 2 | Namco ND-1 | March 1996 | Yes | Yes | Yes | Included original and "arranged" versions of Pac-Man, Dig Dug and Rally-X. |
| Abnormal Check | Namco ND-1 | 1996 | Yes | No | No | |
| Alpine Racer 2 | Namco Super System 22 | December 6, 1996 | Yes | Yes | No | First sequel to Alpine Racer. |
| Super World Stadium '96 | Namco NB-1 | 1996 | Yes | No | No | |
| Alpine Surfer | Namco Super System 22 | July 1996 | Yes | Yes | Yes | Spin-off of Alpine Racer. Players stand on a snowboard instead of skis. |
| Aqua Jet | Namco Super System 22 | 1996 | Yes | No | No | |
| Prop Cycle | Namco Super System 22 | 1996 | Yes | No | No | A relatively relaxed game in which the player controls a flying bicycle by pedaling on a mock-up bicycle. |
| Tokyo Wars | Namco Super System 22 | 1996 | Yes | Yes | No | |
| Time Crisis II | Namco System 23 | March 1997 | Yes | Yes | Yes | First sequel to Time Crisis. |
| Time Crisis II | Namco Super System 23 | March 1997 | Yes | Yes | Yes | First sequel to Time Crisis. |
| Time Crisis II | PlayStation 2 | October 1, 2001 | Yes | Yes | No | First sequel to Time Crisis. |
| Super World Stadium '97 | Namco NB-1 | 1997 | Yes | No | No | |
| Armadillo Racing | Namco Super System 22 | 1997 | Yes | No | No | A racing game with trackball control. |
| Final Furlong | Namco System 22.5 | 1997 | Yes | No | Yes | A multiplayer horse racing game with a force feedback saddle. |
| Rapid River | Namco System 22.5 | 1997 | Yes | Yes | No | |
| Motocross Go! | Namco System 23 | 1997 | Yes | No | No | |
| Downhill Bikers | Namco System 23 | 1997 | Yes | No | No | |
| Panic Park | Namco System 23 | 1997 | Yes | Yes | Yes | |
| Angler King | Namco System 23 | 1998 | Yes | No | No | |
| 500GP | Namco Super System 23 | 1998 | Yes | No | No | |
| Gunmen Wars | Namco Super System 23 GMEN | 1998 | Yes | No | No | |
| Race On! | Namco Super System 23 GMEN | 1998 | Yes | No | No | |
| Final Furlong 2 | Namco Super System 23 GMEN | 1998 | Yes | No | No | Sequel to Final Furlong. |
| Crisis Zone | Namco Super System 23 Evolution 2 | March 29, 1999 | Yes | Yes | Yes | Arcade spin-off of Time Crisis. |
| Crisis Zone | PlayStation 2 | September 17, 2004 | No | Yes | Yes | Arcade spin-off of Time Crisis. |
| Guitar Jam | Namco Super System 23 | April 17, 1999 | Yes | No | No | Rhythm game similar to Konami's GuitarFreaks, released earlier the same year. |

=== Namco console-based systems ===
| Title | Arcade Systems/Consoles | Release date | JP | NA | PAL | Notes |
|---|---|---|---|---|---|---|
| Tekken | Namco System 11 | December 9, 1994 | Yes | Yes | No | Namco's answer to Sega's Virtua Fighter. |
| Tekken | PlayStation | March 31, 1995 | Yes | Yes | No | Namco's answer to Sega's Virtua Fighter. |
| Tekken 2 | Namco System 11 | August 3, 1995 | Yes | Yes | No | First sequel to Tekken. |
| Tekken 2 | PlayStation | March 29, 1996 | Yes | Yes | No | First sequel to Tekken. |
| Soul Edge | Namco System 11 | December 1995 | Yes | Yes | No | Developed by Project Soul. |
| Soul Edge | PlayStation | December 20, 1996 | Yes | Yes | No | Developed by Project Soul. |
| Dunk Mania | Namco System 11 | 1996 | Yes | Yes | No | |
| Xevious 3D/G | Namco System 11 | April 1996 | Yes | No | No | Third sequel to Xevious. |
| Xevious 3D/G | PlayStation | March 28, 1997 | Yes | Yes | No | Released as Xevious 3D/G+. |
| Soul Edge Ver. II | Namco System 11 | May 16, 1996 | Yes | No | No | Developed by Project Soul. Alternative arcade version of Soul Edge. |
| Dancing Eyes | Namco System 11 | August 27, 1996 | Yes | No | No | |
| J-League Soccer Prime Goal EX | Namco System 11 | 1996 | Yes | No | No | Sequel to J-League Soccer V Shoot. |
| Pocket Racer | Namco System 11 | 1996 | Yes | No | No | Arcade spin-off of Ridge Racer with mini-machines. |
| Tekken 3 | Namco System 12 | March 20, 1997 | Yes | No | No | Second sequel to Tekken. |
| Tekken 3 | PlayStation | March 26, 1998 | Yes | Yes | No | Second sequel to Tekken. |
| LiberoGrande | Namco System 12 | 1997 | Yes | No | No | |
| LiberoGrande | PlayStation | March 26, 1998 | Yes | No | Yes | |
| Techno Drive | Namco System 12 | July 1, 1998 | Yes | No | No | |
| Soulcalibur | Namco System 12 | July 30, 1998 | Yes | Yes | No | Developed by Project Soul. Sequel to Soul Edge. The Dreamcast port features enhanced graphics. |
| Soulcalibur | Dreamcast | August 5, 1999 | Yes | Yes | Yes | Developed by Project Soul. Sequel to Soul Edge. The Dreamcast port features enhanced graphics. |
| Fighting Layer | Namco System 12 | December 1998 | Yes | No | No | Developed by Arika. |
| Derby Quiz: My Dream Horse | Namco System 12 | 1998 | Yes | No | No | |
| Super World Stadium '98 | Namco System 12 | 1998 | Yes | No | No | |
| Tenkomori Shooting | Namco System 12 | 1998 | Yes | No | No | |
| Tekken Tag Tournament | Namco System 12 | July 1999 | Yes | Yes | No | |
| Tekken Tag Tournament | PlayStation 2 | March 30, 2000 | Yes | Yes | No | |
| Mr. Driller | Namco System 12 | October 1999 | Yes | Yes | No | |
| Mr. Driller | PlayStation | May 10, 2000 | Yes | Yes | No | |
| Mr. Driller | Dreamcast | June 25, 2000 | Yes | Yes | Yes | |
| Mr. Driller | Game Boy Color | June 29, 2000 | Yes | Yes | No | |
| Mr. Driller | Windows | February 1, 2001 | Yes | No | Yes | |
| Mr. Driller | Mobile | September 20, 2004 | No | Yes | No | |
| Aqua Rush | Namco System 12 | 1999 | Yes | No | No | |
| Golgo 13 | Namco System 12 | 1999 | Yes | No | No | Developed by 8ing/Raizing. Sniper gun game based on Japanese manga Golgo 13. |
| Kaiun Quiz | Namco System 12 | 1999 | Yes | No | No | |
| Ghoul Panic | Namco System 12 | 1999 | Yes | No | No | Developed by 8ing/Raizing. Known as Oh! Bakyuun in Japan. Spin-off of Point Blank. |
| Ghoul Panic | PlayStation | April 20, 2000 | Yes | No | No | Developed by 8ing/Raizing. Known as Oh! Bakyuun in Japan. Spin-off of Point Blank. |
| Super World Stadium '99 | Namco System 12 | 1999 | Yes | No | No | |
| Vampire Night | Namco System 246 | January 1, 2000 | Yes | No | No | Developed by Wow Entertainment. |
| Vampire Night | PlayStation 2 | November 14, 2001 | Yes | Yes | No | Developed by Wow Entertainment. |
| Mr. Driller 2 | Namco System 10 | July 2000 | Yes | Yes | No | Sequel to Mr. Driller. |
| Mr. Driller 2 | Game Boy Advance | March 21, 2001 | Yes | Yes | Yes | Sequel to Mr. Driller. |
| Mr. Driller 2 | Windows | March 29, 2002 | Yes | No | No | Sequel to Mr. Driller. |
| Point Blank 3 | Namco System 11 | 2000 | Yes | Yes | No | Second sequel to Point Blank. Known in Japan as Gunbalina. |
| Point Blank 3 | Namco System 12 | 2000 | Yes | Yes | No | Second sequel to Point Blank. Known in Japan as Gunbalina. |
| Point Blank 3 | Namco System 10 | 2000 | Yes | Yes | No | Second sequel to Point Blank. Known in Japan as Gunbalina. |
| Point Blank 3 | PlayStation | December 21, 2000 | Yes | Yes | No | Second sequel to Point Blank. Known in Japan as Gunbalina. |
| Golgo 13 Kiseki no Dandou | Namco System 12 | 2000 | Yes | No | No | Developed by 8ing/Raizing. First sequel to Golgo 13. |
| Super World Stadium 2000 | Namco System 12 | 2000 | Yes | No | No | |
| Truck Kyosokyoku | Namco System 12 | June 2000 | Yes | Yes | Yes | Developed by Metro. |
| GAHAHA Ippatsu-do | Namco System 10 | 2000 | Yes | Yes | Yes | Developed by Metro. |
| GAHAHA Ippatsu-do 2 | Namco System 10 | 2001 | Yes | No | No | Developed by Metro. Japan-exclusive update to GAHAHA Ippatsu-do. |
| Wangan Midnight | Namco System 246 | February 2, 2001 | Yes | No | No | Based on the manga Wangan Midnight. |
| Wangan Midnight | PlayStation 2 | March 21, 2002 | Yes | No | No | Based on the manga Wangan Midnight. |
| Taiko no Tatsujin | Namco System 10 | February 21, 2001 | Yes | No | No | |
| Tekken 4 | Namco System 246 | July 2001 | Yes | No | No | |
| Tekken 4 | PlayStation 2 | March 28, 2002 | Yes | Yes | No | |
| Taiko no Tatsujin 2 | Namco System 10 | August 6, 2001 | Yes | No | No | Sequel to Taiko no Tatsujin. |
| Wangan Midnight R | Namco System 246 | December 20, 2001 | Yes | No | No | Sequel to Wangan Midnight. |
| Kotoba no Puzzle: Mojipittan | Namco System 10 | December 2001 | Yes | No | No | |
| Kotoba no Puzzle: Mojipittan | PlayStation 2 | January 9, 2003 | Yes | Yes | No | |
| Golgo 13 Juusei no Requiem | Namco System 12 | 2001 | Yes | No | No | Second and last sequel to Golgo 13. |
| Super World Stadium 2001 | Namco System 12 | 2001 | Yes | No | No | |
| Mr. Driller G | Namco System 10 | 2001 | Yes | No | No | |
| Mr. Driller G | PlayStation | November 22, 2001 | Yes | No | No | |
| Taiko no Tatsujin 3 | Namco System 10 | March 15, 2002 | Yes | No | No | |
| Soulcalibur II | Namco System 246 | July 10, 2002 | Yes | Yes | No | Sequel to Soulcalibur. |
| Soulcalibur II | PlayStation 2 | March 27, 2003 | Yes | Yes | Yes | Sequel to Soulcalibur. |
| Soulcalibur II | GameCube | March 27, 2003 | Yes | Yes | No | Sequel to Soulcalibur. |
| Soulcalibur II | Xbox | March 27, 2003 | Yes | Yes | No | Sequel to Soulcalibur. |
| Time Crisis 3 | Namco System 246 | September 16, 2002 | Yes | Yes | No | Second sequel to Time Crisis. |
| Time Crisis 3 | PlayStation 2 | October 21, 2003 | Yes | Yes | Yes | Second sequel to Time Crisis. |
| Taiko no Tatsujin 4 | Namco System 10 | December 12, 2002 | Yes | No | No | |
| Star Trigon | Namco System 10 | 2002 | Yes | No | No | |
| Dragon Chronicles | Namco System 246 | 2002 | Yes | No | No | |
| Samurai Surf X | Namco System 246 | 2002 | Yes | No | No | |
| Professional Baseball 2002 | Namco System 246 | 2002 | Yes | No | No | |
| Smash Court Tennis | Namco System 246 | 2002 | Yes | No | No | |
| Youth Quiz: Colorful High School | Namco System 10 | March 20, 2003 | Yes | No | No | Developed in Late 2002 by 8ing/Raizing, released the following year. |
| Taiko no Tatsujin 5 | Namco System 10 | October 6, 2003 | Yes | No | No | |
| Dragon Chronicles II | Namco System 246 | 2003 | Yes | No | No | Sequel to Dragon Chronicles. |
| Love Quiz: High School Angel | Namco System 10 | 2003 | Yes | No | No | Developed by 8ing/Raizing. Sequel to Youth Quiz: Colorful High School. |
| Taiko no Tatsujin 6 | Namco System 10 | July 15, 2004 | Yes | No | No | |
| Tekken 5 | Namco System 246 | September 1, 2004 | Yes | No | No | |
| Tekken 5 | PlayStation 2 | 2005 | Yes | Yes | Yes | |
| Tekken 5: Dark Resurrection | Namco System 246 | September 23, 2005 | Yes | No | No | |
| Tekken 5: Dark Resurrection | PlayStation Portable | July 2006 | Yes | Yes | Yes | |
| Mario Kart Arcade GP | Namco-Sega-Nintendo Triforce | October 10, 2005 | Yes | No | No | Co-produced with Nintendo. |
| Taiko no Tatsujin 7 | Namco System 246 | 2005 | Yes | No | No | |
| Tekken 5.1 | Namco System 246 | December 9, 2004 | Yes | Yes | No | |
| The Idolmaster | Namco System 256 | July 26, 2005 | Yes | No | No | Based on the prototype Idol Game. |
| Time Crisis 4 | Namco System Super 256 | June 20, 2006 | Yes | Yes | No | Third sequel to Time Crisis. |
| Mario Kart Arcade GP 2 | Namco-Sega-Nintendo Triforce | 2007 | Yes | Yes | No | Co-produced with Nintendo. |

=== Namco PC-based systems ===
| Title | Arcade Systems | Release date | JP | NA | PAL | Notes |
|---|---|---|---|---|---|---|
| Counter Strike Neo | Namco System N2 | 2003 | Yes | No | No | Part of Valve's Counter-Strike series. |
| Wangan Midnight: Maximum Tune 3 | Namco System N2 | 2007 | Yes | Yes | Yes | |
| Wangan Midnight: Maximum Tune 3DX | Namco System N2 | 2008 | Yes | Yes | Yes | |
| Wangan Midnight: Maximum Tune 3DX Plus | Namco System N2 | 2010 | Yes | Yes | Yes | |
| Wangan Midnight: Maximum Tune 4 | Namco System ES1 | 2011 | Yes | Yes | Yes | Released 2012 for certain Asia regions. |
| Mario Kart Arcade GP DX | Namco System ES3-A | 2013 | Yes | Yes | Yes | Released 2014 for North America and European regions. |
| Wangan Midnight: Maximum Tune 5 | Namco System ES1/ES3-X | 2014 | Yes | Yes | Yes | Released 2015 for certain Asia regions, 2017 for North America. |
| Pokkén Tournament | Namco System ES3-B | 2015 | Yes | No | No | |
| Wangan Midnight: Maximum Tune 5DX | Namco System ES1/ES3-X | 2015 | Yes | Yes | Yes | Released 2016 for certain Asia regions. |
| Wangan Midnight: Maximum Tune 5DX Plus | Namco System ES1/ES3-X | 2016 | Yes | Yes | Yes | Released 2017 for certain Asia regions. |
| Wangan Midnight: Maximum Tune 6 | Namco System ES3-X | 2018 | Yes | No | No | |

=== Third-party systems ===
| Title | Arcade Systems/Consoles | Release date | JP | NA | PAL | Notes |
|---|---|---|---|---|---|---|
| Air Buster | Kaneko | 1990 | Yes | Yes | No | Developed by Kaneko, released by Namco in Japan, licensed by Namco to Sharp Image Electronics in North America. |
| Turbo Force | Video System | July 1991 | Yes | No | No | Developed by Video System, released by Namco in Japan. |
| Magical Speed | Allumer | 1994 | Yes | No | No | Developed by Allumer, released by Namco in Japan. |
| Kosodate Quiz My Angel | Seta 2nd Generation | July 1996 | Yes | No | No | |
| Kosodate Quiz My Angel | PlayStation | November 13, 1997 | Yes | No | No | |
| Kosodate Quiz My Angel | WonderSwan | April 15, 1999 | Yes | No | No | |
| Kosodate Quiz My Angel 2 | Seta 2nd Generation | 1997 | Yes | No | No | First sequel to Kosodate Quiz: My Angel. |
| Kosodate Quiz My Angel 2 | PlayStation | March 25, 1999 | Yes | No | No | First sequel to Kosodate Quiz: My Angel. |
| Kosodate Quiz My Angel 3: My Pet | Seta 2nd Generation | 1998 | Yes | No | No | Second sequel to Kosodate Quiz: My Angel. |
| Ninja Assault | Sega Naomi | November 18, 2000 | Yes | Yes | No | |
| Ninja Assault | PlayStation 2 | September 9, 2002 | Yes | Yes | Yes | |
| World Kicks | Sega Naomi | 2000 | Yes | Yes | No | |
| Mazan: Flash Of The Blade | Sega Naomi | 2002 | Yes | Yes | No | |
| Wangan Midnight: Maximum Tune | Sega Chihiro | July 2003 | Yes | No | No | Also known as Wangan Midnight: Maxi Boost. |
| Wangan Midnight: Maximum Tune 2 | Sega Chihiro | April 2004 | Yes | No | No | Also known as Wangan Midnight: Maxi Boost 2. |
| Cobra: The Arcade | Sega Chihiro | November 2005 | Yes | No | No | Developed by Nex Entertainment. Based on the Japanese manga Space Adventure Cobra. |
| Druaga Online: The Story of Aon | Sega Chihiro | 2005 | Yes | Yes | No | |

=== Unknown hardware ===
| Title | Release date | JP | NA | PAL | Notes |
|---|---|---|---|---|---|
| Cosmoswat | 1984 | Yes | No | No | Re-skin of Shoot Away. |
| Shoot Away II | 1992 | Yes | Yes | No | Sequel to Shoot Away. |
| Balance Try | 1999 | Yes | No | No | |
| Ryori no Tatsujin | April 2000 | Yes | No | No | |
| Wide Wide Clipper | December 2000 | Yes | No | No | |
| Ryori no Tatsujin 2: Hocho no Tatsujin | April 2001 | Yes | No | No | Sequel to Ryori no Tatsujin. |

=== Atari releases in Japan ===
Namco released a number of Atari arcade titles in Japan.

| Title | Release date | Ref |
|---|---|---|
| Space Race | 1974 | |
| Gran Trak 10 | 1974 | |
| Gotcha | 1974 | |
| Indy 800 | 1976 | |
| Breakout | 1976 | |
| Marble Madness | 1985 | |
| Paperboy | 1985 | |
| Peter Pack Rat | 1985 | |
| Gauntlet | 1986 | |
| Indiana Jones and the Temple of Doom | 1986 | |
| Super Sprint | 1986 | |
| Hard Drivin' | 1989 | |
| Klax | 1990 | |
| Rampart | 1991 | |

== Console-based games ==
=== Published, developed, and/or produced ===
| Title | Consoles/Arcade Systems | Release date | JP | NA | PAL | Notes |
|---|---|---|---|---|---|---|
| Warpman | NES | July 12, 1985 | Yes | No | No | |
| Battle City | NES | September 9, 1985 | Yes | No | No | Successor to Tank Battalion. |
| Battle City | Nintendo VS. System | 1985 | Yes | No | No | Successor to Tank Battalion. |
| Star Luster | NES | December 6, 1985 | Yes | No | No | Namco's first original game for home consoles. |
| Star Luster | Nintendo VS. System | 1985 | Yes | No | No | Namco's first original game for home consoles. |
| Tower of Babel | NES | July 18, 1986 | Yes | No | No | |
| Tower of Babel | Nintendo VS. System | 1986 | Yes | No | No | |
| Valkyrie no Bōken: Toki no Kagi Densetsu | NES | August 1, 1986 | Yes | No | No | |
| Valkyrie no Bōken: Toki no Kagi Densetsu | Nintendo VS. System | 1986 | Yes | No | No | |
| Super Xevious: GAMP no Nazo | NES | September 19, 1986 | Yes | No | No | Developed by TOSE. Second sequel to Xevious. |
| Super Xevious: GAMP no Nazo | Nintendo VS. System | 1986 | Yes | No | No | Developed by TOSE. Second sequel to Xevious. |
| Mappy-Land | NES | November 26, 1986 | Yes | No | No | Developed by TOSE. Second sequel to Mappy. |
| Pro Yakyū Family Stadium | NES | December 10, 1986 | Yes | No | No | Known as R.B.I. Baseball in North America. |
| Sanma no Meitantei | NES | April 2, 1987 | Yes | No | No | |
| Family Jockey | NES | April 24, 1987 | Yes | No | No | |
| Family Jockey | Game Boy | March 29, 1991 | Yes | No | No | Developed by Use. |
| Family Mahjong | NES | August 11, 1987 | Yes | No | No | Developed by Nichibutsu. |
| Family Tennis | NES | December 11, 1987 | Yes | No | No | |
| Family Tennis | Nintendo VS. System | 1987 | Yes | No | No | |
| Namco Classic | NES | May 27, 1988 | Yes | No | No | Developed by TOSE. |
| Namco Classic | Game Boy | December 3, 1991 | Yes | No | No | Developed by TOSE. |
| The Quest of Ki | NES | July 22, 1988 | Yes | No | No | Developed by Game Studio. Part of the Babylonian Castle Saga franchise. |
| The Quest of Ki | Nintendo VS. System | 1988 | Yes | No | No | Developed by Game Studio. Part of the Babylonian Castle Saga franchise. |
| Erika to Satoru no Yume Bōken | NES | September 27, 1988 | Yes | No | No | Developed by Atlus. |
| King of Kings | NES | December 9, 1988 | Yes | No | No | Developed by Atlus. |
| Wagan Land | NES | February 9, 1989 | Yes | No | No | Developed by Now Production. |
| Wagan Land | Game Gear | July 26, 1991 | Yes | No | No | Developed by Now Production. |
| Dragon Buster II: Yami no Fūin | NES | April 27, 1989 | Yes | No | No | Developed by TOSE. Sequel to Dragon Buster. |
| Splatterhouse: Wanpaku Graffiti | NES | July 31, 1989 | Yes | No | No | Developed by Now Production. Spin-off to Splatterhouse. |
| Mappy Kids | NES | December 22, 1989 | Yes | No | No | Third sequel to Mappy. |
| Wrestleball | Sega Genesis | February 8, 1991 | Yes | Yes | No | Known as Powerball in North America. |
| Quad Challenge | Sega Genesis | August 6, 1991 | Yes | Yes | No | Developed by Now Production. Based on Four Trax. |
| Super Wagan Land | SNES | December 13, 1991 | Yes | No | No | Developed by Nova. Part of the Wagan Land series. |
| Namco Classic II | NES | March 13, 1992 | Yes | No | No | Developed by TOSE. |
| Xandra no Daibōken: Valkyrie to no Deai | SNES | July 23, 1992 | Yes | No | Yes | Developed by Nova. Part of the Valkyrie series. |
| Splatterhouse 2 | Sega Genesis | August 3, 1992 | Yes | Yes | Yes | Developed by Now Production. Sequel to Spatterhouse. |
| Great Greed | Game Boy | September 17, 1992 | Yes | Yes | No | |
| Namcot Open | SNES | January 29, 1993 | Yes | No | No | Developed by TOSE. |
| Splatterhouse 3 | Sega Genesis | March 18, 1993 | Yes | Yes | No | Developed by Now Production. Second sequel to Spatterhouse. |
| Rolling Thunder 3 | Sega Genesis | May 19, 1993 | No | Yes | No | Developed by Now Production. Second sequel to Rolling Thunder. |
| Smash Tennis | SNES | June 25, 1993 | Yes | No | Yes | |
| Ms. Pac-Man | Game Boy | October 1993 | No | Yes | No | Namco's ports of Ms Pac-Man, originally published by Midway. |
| Ms. Pac-Man | NES | November 1993 | No | Yes | No | Namco's ports of Ms Pac-Man, originally published by Midway. |
| Ms. Pac-Man | Game Gear | 1993 | No | Yes | No | Namco's ports of Ms Pac-Man, originally published by Midway. |
| Pac-Attack | SNES | October 1993 | No | Yes | Yes | Based on Cosmo Gang the Puzzle. |
| Pac-Attack | Sega Genesis | 1993 | No | Yes | No | Based on Cosmo Gang the Puzzle. |
| Pac-Attack | Game Boy | December 1994 | No | Yes | No | Based on Cosmo Gang the Puzzle. |
| Pac-Attack | Game Gear | 1994 | No | Yes | No | Based on Cosmo Gang the Puzzle. |
| Metal Marines | SNES | December 1993 | Yes | Yes | No | Known in Japan as Militia. |
| Pac-Man 2: The New Adventures | SNES | August 26, 1994 | Yes | Yes | Yes | |
| Pac-Man 2: The New Adventures | Sega Genesis | 1994 | No | Yes | No | |
| Pac-In-Time | Game Boy | December 1994 | No | Yes | Yes | Developed by Atreid Concept. Part of the Pac-Man franchise. |
| Pac-In-Time | SNES | January 1995 | Yes | Yes | No | Developed by Atreid Concept. Part of the Pac-Man franchise. |
| Starblade Alpha | PlayStation | March 31, 1995 | Yes | Yes | No | Developed by High-Tech Lab Japan. Remake of Starblade. |
| Ace Combat | PlayStation | June 30, 1995 | Yes | Yes | Yes | |
| Weaponlord | SNES | October 1995 | No | Yes | No | Developed by Visual Concepts. |
| Weaponlord | Sega Genesis | 1995 | No | Yes | No | Developed by Visual Concepts. |
| Ridge Racer Revolution | PlayStation | December 3, 1995 | Yes | Yes | No | Third sequel to Ridge Racer. |
| Tales of Phantasia | SNES | December 15, 1995 | Yes | No | No | Conceived and developed by Wolf Team. |
| Tales of Phantasia | PlayStation | December 23, 1998 | Yes | No | No | Conceived and developed by Wolf Team. |
| Tales of Phantasia | Game Boy Advance | August 1, 2003 | Yes | No | No | Conceived and developed by Wolf Team. |
| Namco Mahjong: Sparrow Garden | PlayStation | January 1, 1996 | Yes | No | No | |
| Golly! Ghosts! Goal! | Windows | March 29, 1996 | Yes | No | No | Spinoff of Golly! Ghost!. |
| Rage Racer | PlayStation | December 3, 1996 | Yes | Yes | No | Fourth sequel to Ridge Racer. |
| Ace Combat 2 | PlayStation | May 30, 1997 | Yes | Yes | Yes | Sequel to Ace Combat. |
| Klonoa: Door to Phantomile | PlayStation | December 11, 1997 | Yes | Yes | Yes | |
| Tales of Destiny | PlayStation | December 23, 1997 | Yes | Yes | No | Developed by Wolf Team. |
| Super Family Gerenade | SNES | February 1, 1998 | Yes | No | No | |
| Point Blank 2 | PlayStation | August 6, 1998 | Yes | Yes | No | Developed by TOSE. First sequel to Point Blank. Known in Japan as Gun Barl |
| Point Blank 2 | Namco System 11 | 1999 | Yes | No | No | Developed by TOSE. First sequel to Point Blank. Known in Japan as Gun Barl |
| Point Blank 2 | Namco System 12 | 1999 | Yes | No | No | Developed by TOSE. First sequel to Point Blank. Known in Japan as Gun Barl |
| Anna Kournikova's Smash Court Tennis | PlayStation | November 12, 1998 | Yes | No | Yes | |
| R4: Ridge Racer Type 4 | PlayStation | December 3, 1998 | Yes | Yes | Yes | |
| Ace Combat 3: Electrosphere | PlayStation | May 27, 1999 | Yes | Yes | Yes | |
| Star Ixiom | PlayStation | September 9, 1999 | Yes | No | Yes | Sequel to Star Luster. |
| Pac-Man World | PlayStation | October 12, 1999 | Yes | Yes | No | Developed by Namco Hometek. |
| Pac-Man World | Game Boy Advance | November 17, 2004 | No | Yes | No | Developed by Full Fat. |
| Dragon Valor | PlayStation | December 2, 1999 | Yes | Yes | Yes | Second sequel to Dragon Buster. |
| Rescue Shot | PlayStation | January 20, 2000 | Yes | No | Yes | Developed by Now Production. |
| Ridge Racer V | PlayStation 2 | March 4, 2000 | Yes | Yes | No | |
| Ridge Racer V | Namco System 246 | 2001 | Yes | No | No | Released as Ridge Racer V: Arcade Battle. |
| LiberoGrande 2 | PlayStation | September 7, 2000 | Yes | No | Yes | Sequel to LiberoGrande. |
| Ms. Pac-Man Maze Madness | PlayStation | September 8, 2000 | Yes | Yes | No | Developed by Namco Hometek. |
| Ms. Pac-Man Maze Madness | Nintendo 64 | November 12, 2000 | No | Yes | No | Developed by Namco Hometek. |
| Ms. Pac-Man Maze Madness | Dreamcast | November 13, 2000 | No | Yes | No | Developed by Namco Hometek. |
| Ms. Pac-Man Maze Madness | Game Boy Advance | November 3, 2004 | No | Yes | No | Developed by Full Fat. |
| MotoGP | PlayStation 2 | October 12, 2000 | Yes | Yes | Yes | First game in the MotoGP series. |
| Najavu no Daiboken: My Favorite Namja Town | PlayStation | October 13, 2000 | Yes | No | No | Based on Namco's Namja Town indoor theme park. |
| Tales of Phantasia: Narikiri Dungeon | Game Boy Color | November 10, 2000 | Yes | No | No | Developed by Wolf Team. |
| Volfoss | PlayStation | February 22, 2001 | Yes | No | No | |
| Klonoa 2: Lunatea's Veil | PlayStation 2 | March 22, 2001 | Yes | Yes | Yes | Sequel to Klonoa: Door to Phantomile. |
| Time Crisis: Project Titan | PlayStation | April 6, 2001 | Yes | Yes | Yes | Developed by Flying Tiger Entertainment. Part of the Time Crisis series. |
| Klonoa: Empire of Dreams | Game Boy Advance | July 19, 2001 | Yes | Yes | Yes | Co-developed with Now Production. |
| Ace Combat 04: Shattered Skies | PlayStation 2 | September 13, 2001 | Yes | Yes | Yes | |
| MotoGP 2 | PlayStation 2 | December 20, 2001 | Yes | Yes | Yes | |
| Tekken Advance | Game Boy Advance | December 21, 2001 | Yes | Yes | No | |
| Pac-Man World 2 | PlayStation 2 | February 24, 2002 | Yes | Yes | Yes | Developed by Namco Hometek. |
| Pac-Man World 2 | GameCube | March 19, 2002 | No | Yes | Yes | Developed by Namco Hometek. |
| Pac-Man World 2 | Xbox | October 15, 2002 | No | Yes | Yes | Developed by Namco Hometek. |
| Xenosaga Episode I: Der Wille zur Macht | PlayStation 2 | February 28, 2002 | Yes | Yes | No | Developed by Monolith Soft. |
| Klonoa Beach Volleyball | PlayStation | April 25, 2002 | Yes | No | Yes | |
| Klonoa 2: Dream Champ Tournament | Game Boy Advance | August 6, 2002 | Yes | Yes | No | Co-developed with Now Production. |
| Dead to Rights | Xbox | August 19, 2002 | Yes | Yes | No | Developed by Namco Hometek. |
| Dead to Rights | PlayStation 2 | November 18, 2002 | Yes | Yes | No | Developed by Namco Hometek. |
| Dead to Rights | GameCube | November 25, 2002 | No | Yes | No | Developed by Namco Hometek. |
| Dead to Rights | Windows | November 10, 2003 | No | Yes | No | Developed by Namco Hometek. |
| Pac-Man Fever | GameCube | September 3, 2002 | No | Yes | No | Namco Hometek commissioned title, developed by Mass Media. |
| Pac-Man Fever | PlayStation 2 | September 3, 2002 | No | Yes | Yes | Namco Hometek commissioned title, developed by Mass Media. |
| Tales of the World: Narikiri Dungeon 2 | Game Boy Advance | October 25, 2002 | Yes | No | No | Developed by Wolf Team and Alfa System. |
| Klonoa Heroes: Densetsu no Star Medal | Game Boy Advance | December 13, 2002 | Yes | No | No | |
| Mr. Driller Drill Land | GameCube | December 20, 2002 | Yes | No | No | |
| Venus & Braves | PlayStation 2 | February 13, 2003 | Yes | No | No | |
| MotoGP 3 | PlayStation 2 | February 27, 2003 | Yes | Yes | Yes | |
| Tales of the World: Summoner's Lineage | Game Boy Advance | March 7, 2003 | Yes | No | No | Developed by Magic Company. |
| Tales of Symphonia | GameCube | August 29, 2003 | Yes | Yes | Yes | Developed by Namco Tales Studio. |
| Tales of Symphonia | PlayStation 2 | September 22, 2004 | Yes | No | No | Developed by Namco Tales Studio. |
| Kill Switch | PlayStation 2 | October 28, 2003 | No | Yes | Yes | Developed by Namco Hometek. |
| Kill Switch | Windows | March 3, 2004 | No | Yes | No | Developed by Namco Hometek. |
| R: Racing Evolution | PlayStation 2 | November 27, 2003 | Yes | Yes | Yes | |
| R: Racing Evolution | GameCube | November 27, 2003 | Yes | Yes | Yes | |
| R: Racing Evolution | Xbox | November 27, 2003 | Yes | Yes | Yes | |
| Baten Kaitos: Eternal Wings and the Lost Ocean | GameCube | December 5, 2003 | Yes | Yes | Yes | Developed by Monolith Soft and tri-Crescendo. |
| Breakdown | Xbox | January 29, 2004 | Yes | Yes | No | |
| Katamari Damacy | PlayStation 2 | March 18, 2004 | Yes | Yes | No | |
| Xenosaga Episode II: Jenseits von Gut und Böse | PlayStation 2 | June 24, 2004 | Yes | Yes | Yes | Developed by Monolith Soft. |
| Street Racing Syndicate | GameCube | August 31, 2004 | No | Yes | No | Namco Hometek title, Developed by Eutechnyx. |
| Street Racing Syndicate | PlayStation 2 | August 31, 2004 | No | Yes | No | Namco Hometek title, Developed by Eutechnyx. |
| Street Racing Syndicate | Xbox | August 31, 2004 | No | Yes | No | Namco Hometek title, Developed by Eutechnyx. |
| Street Racing Syndicate | Windows | January 18, 2005 | No | Yes | No | Namco Hometek title, Developed by Eutechnyx. |
| Street Racing Syndicate | Game Boy Advance | October 4, 2005 | No | Yes | No | Namco Hometek title, Developed by Eutechnyx. |
| Critical Velocity | PlayStation 2 | October 13, 2005 | Yes | No | No | Related to the Ridge Racer series. |
| Ace Combat 5: The Unsung War | PlayStation 2 | October 21, 2004 | Yes | Yes | Yes | |
| Tales of Rebirth | PlayStation 2 | December 16, 2004 | Yes | No | No | Developed by Namco Tales Studio. |
| Tales of the World: Narikiri Dungeon 3 | Game Boy Advance | January 6, 2005 | Yes | No | No | Developed by Alfa System. |
| Death by Degrees | PlayStation 2 | January 27, 2005 | Yes | Yes | Yes | |
| Dead to Rights II | PlayStation 2 | April 12, 2005 | No | Yes | No | Namco Hometek commissioned title, developed by Widescreen Games. Sequel to Dead to Rights. |
| Dead to Rights II | Xbox | April 12, 2005 | No | Yes | No | Namco Hometek commissioned title, developed by Widescreen Games. Sequel to Dead to Rights. |
| Dead to Rights II | Windows | August 15, 2005 | No | Yes | No | Namco Hometek commissioned title, developed by Widescreen Games. Sequel to Dead to Rights. |
| Namco × Capcom | PlayStation 2 | May 26, 2005 | Yes | No | No | Developed by Monolith Soft. |
| MotoGP 4 | PlayStation 2 | May 27, 2005 | Yes | Yes | Yes | |
| Dead to Rights: Reckoning | PlayStation Portable | June 28, 2005 | No | Yes | Yes | Namco Hometek commissioned title, developed by Rebellion Developments. |
| We Love Katamari | PlayStation 2 | July 6, 2005 | Yes | Yes | No | Sequel to Katamari Damacy. |
| Sigma Star Saga | Game Boy Advance | August 16, 2005 | No | Yes | No | Developed by WayForward. |
| Tales of Legendia | PlayStation 2 | August 25, 2005 | Yes | Yes | No | Developed by Project MelFes. |
| Urban Reign | PlayStation 2 | September 13, 2005 | Yes | Yes | Yes | |
| Soulcalibur III | PlayStation 2 | October 25, 2005 | Yes | Yes | Yes | Developed by Project Soul. |
| Soulcalibur III | Namco System 246 | 2006 | Yes | No | No | Released as Soulcalibur III: Arcade Edition. |
| Pac-Man World 3 | PlayStation 2 | November 15, 2005 | No | Yes | No | Namco Hometek commissioned title, developed by Blitz Games. |
| Pac-Man World 3 | GameCube | November 15, 2005 | No | Yes | No | Namco Hometek commissioned title, developed by Blitz Games. |
| Pac-Man World 3 | Xbox | November 17, 2005 | No | Yes | No | Namco Hometek commissioned title, developed by Blitz Games. |
| Pac-Man World 3 | PlayStation Portable | December 6, 2005 | No | Yes | No | Namco Hometek commissioned title, developed by Blitz Games. |
| Pac-Man World 3 | Nintendo DS | December 7, 2005 | No | Yes | No | Namco Hometek commissioned title, developed by Blitz Games. |
| Pac-Man World 3 | Windows | December 8, 2005 | No | Yes | No | Namco Hometek commissioned title, developed by Blitz Games. |
| Ridge Racer 6 | Xbox 360 | November 22, 2005 | Yes | Yes | Yes | |
| Tales of the Abyss | PlayStation 2 | December 15, 2005 | Yes | No | No | Developed by Namco Tales Studio. |
| Me & My Katamari | PlayStation Portable | December 22, 2005 | Yes | Yes | No | |
| Ace Combat Zero: The Belkan War | PlayStation 2 | March 23, 2006 | Yes | No | No | |

=== Developed only ===
| Title | Consoles/Arcade Systems | Release date | JP | NA | PAL | Notes |
|---|---|---|---|---|---|---|
| Kaze no Klonoa: Moonlight Museum | WonderSwan | May 20, 1999 | Yes | No | No | Published by Bandai. Second game after Klonoa: Door to Phantomile. |
| Tekken Card Challenge | WonderSwan | June 17, 1999 | Yes | No | No | Published by Bandai. |
| Namco Super Wars | WonderSwan Color | October 31, 2002 | Yes | No | No | Published by Bandai. |
| Donkey Konga | GameCube | December 12, 2003 | Yes | Yes | Yes | Developed with Nintendo. |
| Donkey Konga 2 | GameCube | July 1, 2004 | Yes | Yes | Yes | Developed with Nintendo. |
| Star Fox: Assault | GameCube | February 14, 2005 | Yes | Yes | Yes | Developed with Nintendo. |
| Donkey Konga 3 | GameCube | March 17, 2005 | Yes | No | No | Developed with Nintendo. |
| Mario Superstar Baseball | GameCube | July 21, 2005 | Yes | Yes | Yes | Developed with Nintendo. |

=== Published only ===
| Title | Consoles/Arcade Systems | Release date | JP | NA | PAL | Notes |
|---|---|---|---|---|---|---|
| Family Circuit | NES | January 6, 1988 | Yes | No | No | Developed by Game Studio. |
| Quinty | NES | June 27, 1989 | Yes | No | No | Developed by Game Freak. |
| Tenkaichi Bushi Keru Nagūru | NES | July 21, 1989 | Yes | No | No | Developed by Game Studio. |
| I-Ninja | PlayStation 2 | November 18, 2003 | No | Yes | No | Namco Hometek title, developed by Argonaut Games. |
| I-Ninja | GameCube | December 4, 2003 | No | Yes | No | Namco Hometek title, developed by Argonaut Games. |
| I-Ninja | Xbox | December 4, 2003 | No | Yes | No | Namco Hometek title, developed by Argonaut Games. |
| Pac-Man Vs. | GameCube | November 27, 2003 | Yes | Yes | Yes | Developed by Nintendo EAD. Published versions are bundled with other Namco games. |

=== Compilations ===
| Title | Consoles | Release date | JP | NA | PAL | Notes |
|---|---|---|---|---|---|---|
| Namco Museum Vol. 1 | PlayStation | November 22, 1995 | Yes | Yes | Yes | |
| Namco Museum Vol. 2 | PlayStation | February 9, 1996 | Yes | Yes | Yes | |
| Namco Museum Vol. 3 | PlayStation | June 21, 1996 | Yes | Yes | Yes | |
| Namco Museum Vol. 4 | PlayStation | November 8, 1996 | Yes | Yes | Yes | |
| Namco Museum Vol. 5 | PlayStation | February 28, 1997 | Yes | Yes | Yes | |
| Namco Museum Encore | PlayStation | October 30, 1997 | Yes | No | No | |
| Namco Anthology 1 | PlayStation | June 4, 1998 | Yes | No | No | Developed by TOSE. |
| Namco Anthology 2 | PlayStation | September 23, 1998 | Yes | No | No | Developed by TOSE. |
| Namco Collection Vol. 1 | Windows | April 2, 1999 | Yes | No | No | |
| Namco Collection Vol. 2 | Windows | April 30, 1999 | Yes | No | No | |
| Namco Museum 64 | Nintendo 64 | October 31, 1999 | No | Yes | No | Namco Hometek commissioned title, developed by Mass Media. |
| Namco Museum 64 | Dreamcast | June 25, 2000 | No | Yes | No | Namco Hometek commissioned title, developed by Mass Media. Titled Namco Museum. |
| Namco Museum 64 | Game Boy Advance | June 11, 2001 | Yes | Yes | Yes | Namco Hometek commissioned title, developed by Mass Media. Titled Namco Museum. |
| Pac-Man Collection | Game Boy Advance | July 12, 2001 | Yes | Yes | Yes | Namco Hometek commissioned title, developed by Mass Media Games. |
| Namco Museum | PlayStation 2 | December 4, 2001 | No | Yes | No | Namco Hometek commissioned title, developed by Mass Media. |
| Namco Museum | GameCube | October 8, 2002 | No | Yes | No | Namco Hometek commissioned title, developed by Mass Media. |
| Namco Museum | Xbox | October 9, 2002 | No | Yes | No | Namco Hometek commissioned title, developed by Mass Media. |
| Namco Museum Battle Collection | PlayStation Portable | February 24, 2005 | Yes | Yes | No | Developed by Namco Tales Studio. |
| Namco Museum 50th Anniversary | PlayStation 2 | August 30, 2005 | Yes | Yes | No | Namco Hometek commissioned title, developed by Digital Eclipse. |
| Namco Museum 50th Anniversary | Xbox | August 30, 2005 | No | Yes | No | Namco Hometek commissioned title, developed by Digital Eclipse. |
| Namco Museum 50th Anniversary | GameCube | August 30, 2005 | No | Yes | No | Namco Hometek commissioned title, developed by Digital Eclipse. |
| Namco Museum 50th Anniversary | Game Boy Advance | August 30, 2005 | No | Yes | No | Namco Hometek commissioned title, developed by Digital Eclipse. |

=== Ports and licensed games ===
| Title | Consoles/Arcade Systems | Release date | JP | NA | PAL | Notes |
|---|---|---|---|---|---|---|
| BurgerTime | Famicom | November 27, 1985 | Yes | No | No | Port of the arcade game by Data East. |
| The Super Dimension Fortress Macross | Famicom | December 10, 1985 | Yes | No | No | Published by Bandai. Based on the 1982 TV show of the same name. |
| Tag Team Pro Wrestling | Famicom | April 2, 1986 | Yes | No | No | Port of the arcade game by Data East. |
| Super Chinese | Famicom | June 20, 1986 | Yes | No | No | Port of the arcade game by Culture Brain. |
| Dragon Slayer IV: Drasle Family | Famicom | July 17, 1987 | Yes | No | No | Port of the MSX2 game by Nihon Falcom. |
| Family Boxing | Famicom | July 19, 1987 | Yes | No | No | Port of the arcade game by Woodplace. |
| Digital Devil Story: Megami Tensei | Famicom | September 11, 1987 | Yes | No | No | Developed by Atlus. Based on the Digital Devil Story novels by Aya Nishitani. |
| Side Pocket | Famicom | October 30, 1987 | Yes | No | No | Port of the arcade game by Data East. |
| Lupin III: Pandora no Isan | Famicom | November 6, 1987 | Yes | No | No | Part of the Lupin III franchise. |
| Star Wars | Famicom | December 4, 1987 | Yes | No | No | Based on the first Star Wars film. |
| Karnov | Famicom | December 18, 1987 | Yes | No | No | Port of the arcade game by Data East. |
| Hydlide 3: Yami Kara No Houmonsha | Famicom | February 17, 1989 | Yes | No | No | Port of the home computer game by T&E Soft. |
| Devilman | Famicom | April 25, 1989 | Yes | No | No | Developed by Intelligent Systems. Part of the Devilman franchise. |
| Dragon Ninja | Famicom | July 14, 1989 | Yes | No | No | Port of the arcade game by Data East. |
| Family Stadium '89: Kaimaku Ban | Famicom | July 28, 1989 | Yes | No | No | Uses NPB baseball teams. |
| Digital Devil Story: Megami Tensei II | Famicom | April 6, 1990 | Yes | No | No | Developed by Atlus. Based on the Digital Devil Story novels by Aya Nishitani. |
| Klax | Mega Drive | September 7, 1990 | Yes | No | No | Port of the arcade game by Atari Games. |
| Nadia: The Secret of Blue Water | Mega Drive | March 19, 1991 | Yes | No | No | Part of the Nadia: The Secret of Blue Water franchise. |
| Heisei Tensai Bakabon | Famicom | December 6, 1991 | Yes | No | No | Part of the Tensai Bakabon franchise. |
| Chibi Maruko-chan: Waku Waku Shopping | Mega Drive | January 14, 1992 | Yes | No | No | Part of the Chibi Maruko-chan franchise. |
| Super Famista | SNES | March 27, 1992 | Yes | Yes | No | Uses NPB baseball teams. |
| Yu Yu Hakusho | Super Famicom | December 22, 1993 | Yes | No | No | Part of the Yu Yu Hakusho franchise. |
| Yu Yu Hakusho 2: Kakuto no Sho | Super Famicom | June 10, 1994 | Yes | No | No | Part of the Yu Yu Hakusho franchise. |
| Yu Yu Hakusho: Tokubetsu Hen | Super Famicom | December 22, 1994 | Yes | No | No | Part of the Yu Yu Hakusho franchise. |
| Yu Yu Hakusho Final: Makai Saikyo Retsuden | Super Famicom | March 24, 1995 | Yes | No | No | Part of the Yu Yu Hakusho franchise. |
| Famista 64 | Nintendo 64 | November 28, 1997 | Yes | No | No | Uses NPB baseball teams. |
| Smashing Drive | GameCube | February 18, 2002 | No | Yes | No | Namco Hometek title, developed by Point of View, Inc. Port of the arcade game by Gaelco. |
| Smashing Drive | Xbox | May 13, 2002 | No | Yes | No | Namco Hometek title, developed by Point of View, Inc. Port of the arcade game by Gaelco. |
| Famista Advance | Game Boy Advance | June 28, 2002 | Yes | No | No | Uses NPB baseball teams. |
| Family Stadium 2003 | GameCube | May 30, 2003 | Yes | No | No | Uses NPB baseball teams. |
| Spawn: Armageddon | GameCube | November 21, 2003 | No | Yes | Yes | Namco Hometek commissioned title, developed by Point of View, Inc. Based on the Spawn comics. |
| Spawn: Armageddon | Xbox | November 21, 2003 | No | Yes | Yes | Namco Hometek commissioned title, developed by Point of View, Inc. Based on the Spawn comics. |
| Spawn: Armageddon | PlayStation 2 | November 21, 2003 | Yes | Yes | Yes | Namco Hometek commissioned title, developed by Point of View, Inc. Based on the Spawn comics. |
| Hello Kitty: Roller Rescue | GameCube | August 16, 2005 | No | Yes | No | Namco Hometek title, developed by XPEC Entertainment. Part of the Hello Kitty franchise. North American publishing rights. |
| Atomic Betty | Game Boy Advance | August 25, 2005 | No | Yes | No | Namco Hometek commissioned title, developed by Big Blue Bubble. Based on the Atomic Betty TV show. |
| The Berenstain Bears and the Spooky Old Tree | Game Boy Advance | September 20, 2005 | No | Yes | No | Namco Hometek commissioned title, developed by Program-Ace. Based on the Berenstain Bears books. |
| Curious George | PlayStation 2 | February 1, 2006 | No | Yes | No | Namco Hometek commissioned title, developed by Monkey Bar Games. Based on the 2006 film of the same name. |
| Curious George | GameCube | February 1, 2006 | No | Yes | No | Namco Hometek commissioned title, developed by Monkey Bar Games. Based on the 2006 film of the same name. |
| Curious George | Xbox | February 1, 2006 | No | Yes | No | Namco Hometek commissioned title, developed by Monkey Bar Games. Based on the 2006 film of the same name. |
| Curious George | Windows | February 1, 2006 | No | Yes | No | Namco Hometek commissioned title, developed by Monkey Bar Games. Based on the 2006 film of the same name. |

== Other platforms ==
Namco has ventured onto other platforms, either itself or through licensing agreements with other publishers.

| Title | iOS | Mobile | Windows |
|---|---|---|---|
| Dig Dug | ✓ | ✓ | ✓ ^{1} |
| Galaga | | ✓ | |
| Galaga Remix | ✓ | | |
| Galaxian/Galaxian Mini | | ✓ | ✓ ^{1} |
| Ms. Pac-Man | ✓ | ✓ | ✓ ^{2} |
| New Rally-X | | ✓ | |
| Pac-Man | ✓ | ✓ | ✓ ^{1} |
| Pac-Mania | | ✓ | |
| Pole Position | | | ✓ ^{1} |
| Pole Position II | | ✓ | |
| Rally-X | | | ✓ ^{2} |
| Time Crisis Mobile | | ✓ | |
| Xevious/Xevious Mini | | ✓ | ✓ ^{2} |
Notes: 1. Included in Microsoft Return of Arcade.; 2. Included in Microsoft Revenge of Arcade.

== See also ==
- List of Bandai Namco video games
- List of Bandai Namco video game franchises
