= Sord IS-11 =

The Sord IS-11 is an A4-size, lightweight, portable Z80-based notebook computer. The IS-11 ('IS' stands for 'Integrated Software') had no operating system, but came with built-in word processing, spreadsheet, file manager and communication software.

The machine was manufactured by Sord Computer Corporation and released in 1983. It was later followed by the IS-11B and IS-11C.

== Technical description ==
The IS-11 had a CMOS version of the Z80A running at 3.4 MHz with 32-64 KiB NVRAM and 64 KiB ROM. The monochrome non-back-lit LCD screen allowed for 40 characters × 8 lines or 256 × 64 pixels. Data was stored on built-in microcassette recorder (128kb, 2000 baud).

== See also ==
- Sord M23P
