= Shinryaku =

Shinryaku may refer to:

- Shinryaku! Ika Musume
- a vehicle in the arcade game SOS
