= Super World Court =

1993 video game

- Arcade flyer
- Developer: Namco
- Publisher: Namco
- Composer: Masahiro Fuzukawa
- Platform: Arcade
- Release: JP: March 1993
- Genre: Sports
- Modes: Single-player, multiplayer
- Arcade system: Namco NA-1

Super World Court (Note: Japanese: スーパーワールドコート, Hepburn: Sūpā Wārudo Kōto) is a 1993 tennis video game developed and published by Namco for arcades. It was released only in Japan in March 1993. It is the sequel to Pro Tennis: World Court (1988). Hamster Corporation released the game outside Japan for the first time as part of their Arcade Archives series for the Nintendo Switch and PlayStation 4 in May 2025.

== Gameplay ==
At the start of the game, players must select either "singles" (1P vs CPU/2P) or "doubles" (1P & CPU/2P vs 3P/CPU & 4P/CPU) - they will then have to select one of sixteen new players and select one of the four new courts (USA hard, France clay, GB grass, and Namco funny).

The players must then decide whether they want their match to be one or three sets long; the company's signature character, Pac-Man, also makes a cameo appearance upon the Namco court. A timer counts down from a maximum of 360 seconds (depending on how the cabinet has been set) in the top-right corner of the screen; if it has run out by the time a set has been won, the players will have to insert another coin within ten seconds if they wish to continue playing, because if not, then the losing player (or team, if three or four players) shall immediately forfeit the game.

== Reception ==
In Japan, Game Machine listed Super World Court on their May 1, 1993 issue as being the eighteenth most-successful table arcade game of the month.
