= Techno Drive =

1998 video game

- Arcade flyer
- Developer: Namco
- Publisher: Namco
- Artist: Minoru Sashida
- Composer: Koji Nakagawa
- Platform: Arcade
- Release: JP: July 1, 1998
- Genre: Driving simulator
- Mode: Single-player
- Arcade system: Namco System 12

Techno Drive (Note: Techno Drive (Japanese: テクノドライブ, Hepburn: Tekuno Doraibu). Also written as Waza no Unten (技之運転; "Techno Drive").) is a 1998 driving simulator arcade game developed and published by Namco in Japan. It is known for its unique graphical interface that uses fluorescent colors choices and flat shading. Players control a racecar throughout a variety of different minigames, each testing their skill and reaction time. Minigames include drifting along corners, avoiding collision with other vehicles, and driving with a bowl of liquid attached to the rear of the car. The game was designed for the Namco System 12, an arcade board based on raw PlayStation hardware.

Techno Drive is the second in Namco's Almighty Human Project series of simulation games, which also include Gynotai and Photo Battle. Its futuristic aesthetic was designed by Minoru Sashida, who is known for his work on titles such as the Mr. Driller series and Ace Combat 3: Electrosphere. Critics praised Techno Drive for its unique gameplay structure and presentation, finding it a welcome change in pace from other arcade racers of the era.

== Gameplay ==
The player in one of the Steering Technique minigames.

Techno Drive is a driving simulator video game. Its plot revolves around Japan's escalating traffic problems causing the country's roads to become paralyzed and deteriorating the driving ability of its population. The player is sent back to the past via a futuristic race car to rehabilitate drivers and prevent the problems of the future. The objective of the game is to control a car through a variety of racing-themed minigames under a limited amount of time. They are designed to test the player's skill and reaction time, judged by a letter grade from A− to E at the end. Minigames are split into three categories: Steering Technique, which only utilize the steering wheel; Footwork Technique, which use only the gas pedal and brake; and Practical Technique, which make use of all three. Objectives in these minigames differ for each one, including drifting around sharp corners, avoiding collision with other vehicles, driving with a bowl of liquid attached and avoiding any spills, dribbling a ball to the goal, and driving only when a large eyeball is closed. Only three minigames from each category can be played in a single game. Upon completion, the arcade cabinet prints out the player's results and letter grade.

== Development and release ==
Techno Drive is the second game in Namco's Almighty Human Project series, which also include the skeeball-esque Gynotai (1996) and action game Photo Battle (2003). It was designed by a small team of employees led by Minoru Sashida, a designer that was known for his work on redemption games and mechanical prize-winning machines; Sashida used the knowledge he gained from these while developing Techno Drive. Sashida worked primarily on the game's graphical interface, which features bold, fluorescent color choices and flat-shaded polygons. Techno Drive was designed to be vastly different and distinct from Namco's previous racing game offerings, such as Ridge Racer (1993), and appealing towards a wide player demographic. The upbeat soundtrack, which has been described as techno and electronica, was composed by Koji Nakagawa, who later went on to compose similar electronic music for Ace Combat 3: Electrosphere (1999).

Techno Drive was demonstrated at the 1998 Amusement Operator's Union (AOU) tradeshow at the Makuhari Messe convention center in Tokyo, alongside games such as Ehrgeiz, Time Crisis II, and Panic Park. Its original concept attracted attention from publications. The game was published on July 1, 1998 in Japan.

== Reception and legacy ==
Game Machine listed Techno Drive as being the third most popular arcade game of August 1998. A reviewer for Edge described Techno Drive as being a "complete and drastic departure for Namco", and a game that distinguished itself from most other racing arcade games with its futuristic presentation and vastly-different gameplay structure. The reviewer said that it drastically departs from the real-world setting of Namco's previous racing games, such as the Ridge Racer series, and as such made it an intriguing title. Staff from Next Generation believed that Techno Drive possessed the same amount of innovation as Soulcalibur, which was released in the same time frame. They admired the game's stylized graphics, which they took as "a concession to the real meat of the game: technical driving ability". Staff also expressed disappointment towards the lack of any kind of home release. A writer for the Italian publication MegaConsole enjoyed Techno Drive for its immersive techno atmosphere and printer feature. Console Plus writers found Techno Drive to be an aesthetically-pleasing arcade game, and its unique concept made it stand out from other titles. VGM Online praised the soundtrack for its high production values and creativity, but criticized it for lacking variety.

Max Krieger, the creator of the puzzle game CROSSNIQ+, credits Techno Drive for inspiring most of the look and presentation used in his game. A song from the game appears as a playable track in the Nintendo Switch game Taiko no Tatsujin: Drum 'n' Fun!. The music used for the Footwork Technique minigames was played live at Ridge Racer Night 2, a concert hosted to celebrate the 20th anniversary of Ridge Racer in 2014. In July 2015, Bandai Namco Entertainment announced it would cease support for Techno Drive due to a shortage of necessary parts.
