= Sweet Land (arcade game) =

Prize redemption game series

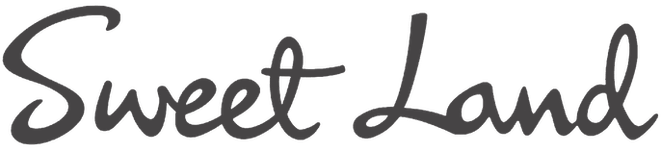
- Series logo.
- Genre: Redemption game
- Developers: Namco; Bandai Namco Entertainment
- Publishers: Namco; Bandai Namco Entertainment
- First release: Sweet Land; June 1987
- Latest release: Sweet Land 5 July 2015

Sweet Land (スウィートランド, Suīto Rando) is a series of prize machine games developed and released by Namco, now known as Bandai Namco Entertainment for arcades in Japan. Up to four players use the metal shovels to scoop up candy and other prizes from a rotating plastic bowl inside the cabinet, and must have the prizes land on a moving table in order for the players to earn them. The original game was developed following requests for Namco to develop prize machine games as opposed to video arcade games in the late 1980s. The series first began in June 1987 with Sweet Land, and has received numerous updates and sequels, the latest of which being Sweet Land 5, released in August 2015 by Bandai Namco Entertainment.

== Games ==
Name	Release date	Notes
Sweet Land	June 1987	
New Sweet Land	May 1991	
Sweet Land II	June 1994	
Sweet Land Mini	July 1996	Smaller cabinet that was only featured in Namco-branded game centers. A variation featured sponsorship from Lego and replaced the prizes with Lego sets.
Sweet Land III	October 1997	Allowed for larger prizes.
Sweet Land 4	November 1998	Several variations of the game were released: Sweet Land 4 Blue Version (December 2002), Sweet Land 4 Sakura Version (2004), and Sweet Land 4 Bright Ver. (2004). Additionally, a "Cooling Unit" for cold-temperature prizes was also distributed. An "RT" (Rehabilitainment) version for disabled players, Sweet Land 4 RT, was released.
Sweet Land Plus	May 2003	Featured a roulette system that allowed for larger quantities or prizes.
Big Sweet Land	July 2003	
Sweet Land Premia	November 2006	
Wonka Sweet Land	December 2007	Featured Wonka-branded candy as prizes.
Sweet Land 5	July 2015	A cooling unit for cold-temperature prizes, "Sweet Cooler Box", was also distributed.

== Related games ==
Name	Release date	Notes
Sweet Factory	1992	Crane game that featured a robot scooping candy as opposed to a claw.
New Sweet Factory	1994	Sequel to Sweet Factory.
Treasure Mountain	September 1995	Awarded medals instead of candy.
Sweet Zack	November 1996	Vertical cylindrical cabinet that featured excavator-like claw controlled via two joysticks.
Sweet-Go-Round	September 1997	Featured rotating claws.
Sweet Wheel	May 2003	Featured a large rotating wheel filled with prizes.
Sweet Scooper	November 2004	Large cylindrical cabinet using a shovel to push prizes directly into the prize chute.
Sweet-Go-Round 2	January 2018	Sequel to Sweet-Go-Round.

== See also ==
- Wide Wide Clipper - Similar series of prize machine arcade games.
