= Lucky & Wild =

1993 video game

- North American promotional sales flyer
- Developer: Namco
- Publisher: Namco
- Designer: Yutaka Kounoe
- Composer: Etsuo Ishii
- Platform: Arcade
- Release: JP: April 1993; NA: May 1993
- Genre: First-person racing/shooter
- Modes: Single-player, multiplayer
- Arcade system: Namco System 2

Lucky & Wild (Note: Japanese: ラッキー＆ワイルド, Hepburn: Rakkī Ando Wairudo) is a first-person racing/shooter arcade game that was released by Namco in 1993; it ran on Namco System 2 hardware.

== Gameplay ==
The first player's character, "Lucky", a sophisticated man in a business suit, has to both drive by means of a steering wheel and accelerator pedal, and shoot using the first light gun; however, the second player's character, "Wild", a surfer with long blond hair, needs to assist in the pursuit with the second light gun. The players must help Lucky and Wild catch six wanted suspects ("Jerky", "Gambit", "Juliora", "Keel", "Bear", and "Big Cigar" himself).

As they pursue the suspect for every stage, Lucky and Wild must fire at enemy cars, and shoot down enemies in sight, along with any projectiles fired at them, and obstacles that block them. When they catch up with the suspect, they must continuously fire upon their car until its energy is depleted; if they succeed in doing so, they will have captured the suspect and will receive a reward, but if the stage's timer runs out, the suspect will escape (indicated by the text of "got away" appearing on the screen).

After each stage, Lucky and Wild drive onto the "Pink Cats Garage" to get their car repaired for the next stage, where they will be "entertained" by young women wearing cats' tails and ears. The game ends when all six stages are cleared, regardless of how many suspects have been captured. There are also five different ways to play the game: one player driving and shooting with another player shooting, but also one player driving with another player manning the gun, one player driving with another player manning both guns, one player driving, another player manning one gun and a third player manning the second gun, and one single player manning both guns while driving (unofficial), for Namco never manufactured a game that allowed a maximum of three players to play simultaneously.

== Development ==
Lucky & Wild was the creation of Yutaka Kounoe, a video game designer who joined Namco in 1991. His first project was Tank Force, an arcade sequel to Tank Battalion, later working on the original Point Blank and the Time Crisis series. The company's planning department looked at the arcade industry and noticed that Japanese video arcades were primarily populated by young couples; Namco and Kounoe decided on making a large-scale arcade machine that could be enjoyed by these couples, primarily men. Looking for inspiration, Kounoe noticed the surge in popularity of buddy-cop movies in Japan, such as CHiPs and Police Story; he decided to make the game a homage to these films, as he felt it would make it easy for players to become engaged with a familiar setting. CHiPS was also the source of inspiration for the game's title, as in Japan it was called Joe & Ponch.

With an idea in place, Kounoe and the development team began production on Lucky & Wild. Early designs for the game took cues from Sega's Rail Chase, specifically its motion-based seat that reacted based on the player's actions in the game, such as shaking when it ran over rocky roads. Lucky & Wild had this idea originally, rocking violently in a see-saw-like fashion. Namco executives pushed to have the lightguns fire a single shot when the trigger was squeezed, which Kounoe and others pushed against due to it making the game impossible to play. As a way to differentiate it from other games already on the market, and to what Kounoe describes as "protect[ing] the pride of the development department, the production team worked to make the game feel fresh and original. Namco's extensive history in the racing game genre, particularly with their Final Lap franchise, allowed the team to build upon those games with their expertise at designing them. Kounoe recalls the toughest part of development to be the controls due to player imbalance. The controls originally were seen as confusing and difficult to implement, leading to long discussions between staff as to how the controls could be made more simplistic and to correct the imbalance.

Although 3D racing games were becoming more popular by the early half of the 1990s, Kounoe chose to stick with 2D sprites and used them to create the illusion of a 3D world. The arcade hardware it ran on, the Namco System 2, had strict limitations that made it difficult to work with during production. To figure out how to bypass these setbacks and create the world they envisioned, the team looked to Pole Position for inspiration, which used a clever technique that aligned sprite-based objects alongside the road that made the illusion of a 3D environment. Kounoe implemented this into Lucky & Wild, using realistic arrangements of lampposts, buildings, hedges and billboards to line against the road and create a large sense of depth. These objects and the rate of movement they scrolled past the player were all done by hand, with some minor assistance from Namco's production toolsets. Objects were painstakingly drawn one at a time, with the team using materials like manga and photo albums for reference. It was believed the game was heavily inspired by the film Tango & Cash due to multiple similarities, such as the similar designs of the protagonists and near-identical theme; Kounoe denied this in an interview, claiming that he was unaware of the film's existence during production and that the similarities were merely a coincidence. Lucky & Wild was released in Japan in April 1993, followed by a release in North America a month later.

== References in other games ==
Lucky & Wild is also borrowed as a fictional American tuning car company brand in the Ridge Racer games with products being muscle cars (similar to those of Danver); the formation of Lucky & Wild protagonists later appeared in Mario Kart Arcade GP DX, with one player driving and the second serving as the gunner. Also, in the first episode of the interactive video series Bear Stearns Bravo, Bear Stearns CEO Jackie Dalton refers to the regulators Franco and Henri by the names "Lucky & Wild".

== Reception ==
Game Machine claims that Lucky & Wild was the third most-popular arcade game of May 1993 in Japan. RePlay also reported Lucky & Wild to be the fourth most-popular deluxe arcade game at the time. Play Meter listed Lucky & Wild to be the twenty-fifth most-popular arcade game at the time as well. Time Extension called it "one of the most incredible titles of the '90s and a game that sorely deserves to get a lot more attention than it currently does."
