= SOS (arcade game) =

1979 video game

SOS Game
- Developer: Nagano Cultural Equipment
- Publishers: Nagano Game/Universal Special Machine; Namco
- Designer: Shigeichi Ishimura
- Programmer: Shouichi Fukatani
- Platform: Arcade
- Release: JP: October 1979
- Genre: Fixed shooter
- Modes: Single-player, multiplayer

SOS Game (Note: Japanese: エスオーエスゲーム, Hepburn: Esu Ō Esu Gēmu) is a fixed shooter arcade video game released by Namco in 1979. It was one of the three final monochromatic titles that was released by the company; the other two were Navarone and Kaitei Takara Sagashi.

== Gameplay ==
The player must use a 2-way joystick to direct a fighter plane across the bottom of the screen, while enemy planes fly down towards it from the top of the screen; they can press the button to make the plane fire bullets from its nose at the enemy planes to destroy them for 10 points apiece. The plane can only fire one bullet at a time, and if it misses the player will have to wait for the bullet to go off the top of the screen before he can try again.

Occasionally, a flashing arrow will appear, and point to either side of the screen while an "SOS" signal is being heard in Morse Code. If the player can manage to move the plane to that side of the screen before the "SOS" signal stops, he will receive 30 extra points, and the number of enemy planes that have bypassed it will decrease by 9 (but if the amount is under 9 at the time, it will have no effect).

If the number of invading (侵略, shinryaku) enemy planes should ever amount to 100, the game will immediately be over, regardless of how many lives the player may have remaining. Every 2,000 points, the message "COFFEE BREAK" will appear, and will show a girl in a bikini. The operator can enable a nudity DIP switch, which will make the girl topless after 6000 points, and naked after 10000 points.
