= Sord Computer Corporation =

- Industry: Peripherals
- Founded: 1970; 56 years ago
- Founder: Takayoshi Shiina
- Headquarters: Chiba, Japan
- Products: Peripherals
- Number of employees: 390 (as of 2009)
- Website: Sord Computer Corporation (in Japanese)

Sord Computer Corporation is a Japanese electronics company, founded in 1970 by the entrepreneur Takayoshi Shiina.

From 1985 until 2018, it was a subsidiary of Toshiba and became known variously as Toshiba Personal Computer System Corporation and Toshiba Platform Solution Corporation.

In 2018, Toshiba sold off the business and its name reverted to Sord Computer Corporation. It now focuses on embedded systems among other interests.

== History ==
=== Early years ===
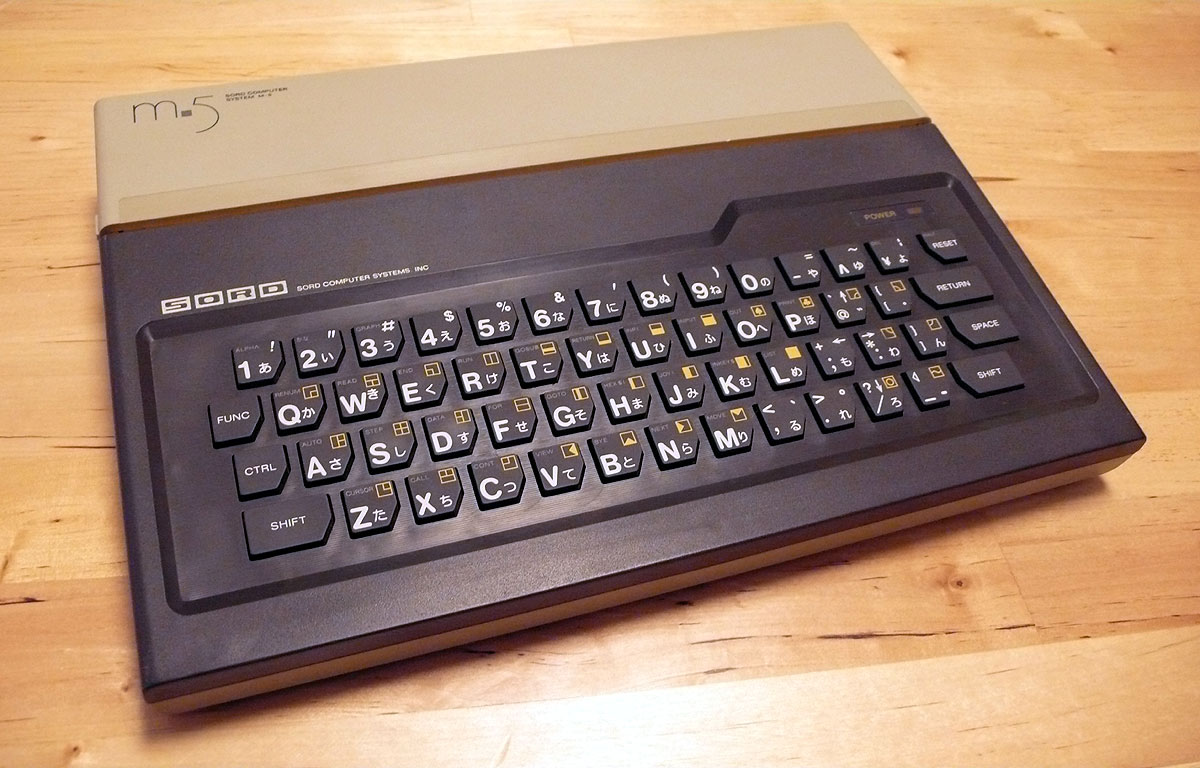
Sord M5 home computer

SORD was founded by Takayoshi Shiina in 1970 when he was 26 years old. Initially, the company wrote software for DEC PDP minicomputers, before it branched out into hardware production. The name SORD is a contraction of SOftware/haRDware, reflecting the dual focus of the company.

Sord presented the SMP80/08 in 1973, one of the first microcomputers, using the Intel 8008 microprocessor. However, it did not have a commercial release. After the first general-purpose microprocessor, the Intel 8080, was announced in April 1974, Sord announced the SMP80/x series in May 1974.

In September 1977, SORD released the M200 Smart Home Computer, one of the first home computers. It was a desktop computer that combined a Zilog Z80 CPU, keyboard, CRT display, floppy disk drive and MF-DOS operating system into an integrated unit.

This was followed by the M100 and various other versions of the M100/M200 series, plus the multi-user M223 and M243 computers. The SORD M23 followed in 1981 and become one of the most popular SORD computers. It was one of the first to see significant use outside Japan.

In 1982, Sord released the M5, a home computer that primarily competed in the Japanese market.

The M68, a dual 8/16 bit computer using both 68000 and Z80 CPUs, was released in Japan in 1983.

The PIPS - Personal (or Pan) Information Processing System was released in 1980. This package was a combined spreadsheet and database business package. This was followed by PIPS-II in 1981, PIPS-III in 1982 and a complete rewrite (by a team led by Peter Hyde) as 4G-PIPS in 1986.

=== Under Toshiba ownership ===
Shiina was approached by a larger Japanese corporation in 1983 and advised to sell. He didn't - and in 1984, on the back of turnover of 35 billion yen and profit of 2 billion yen SORD found itself struggling with suppliers and the banks. SORD was sold to Toshiba in 1985.

Under Toshiba, SORD went on to produce additional hardware such as the M68MX (with no Z80A) and M343SX-II multi-user computer and new versions of PIPS, a series of high performance IBM compatible machines and systems based on Alpha. Latterly, SORD (known at that point as Toshiba-TOPS) changed focus to primarily dealing with embedded systems.

=== Sell-off and restoration of 'Sord' name ===
In 2018, Toshiba sold Toshiba Platform Solution Corporation to Aspirant Group. Following this, the company name was changed back to Sord Computer Corporation. The company continues the focus on embedded systems begun under Toshiba.

== Selected models ==
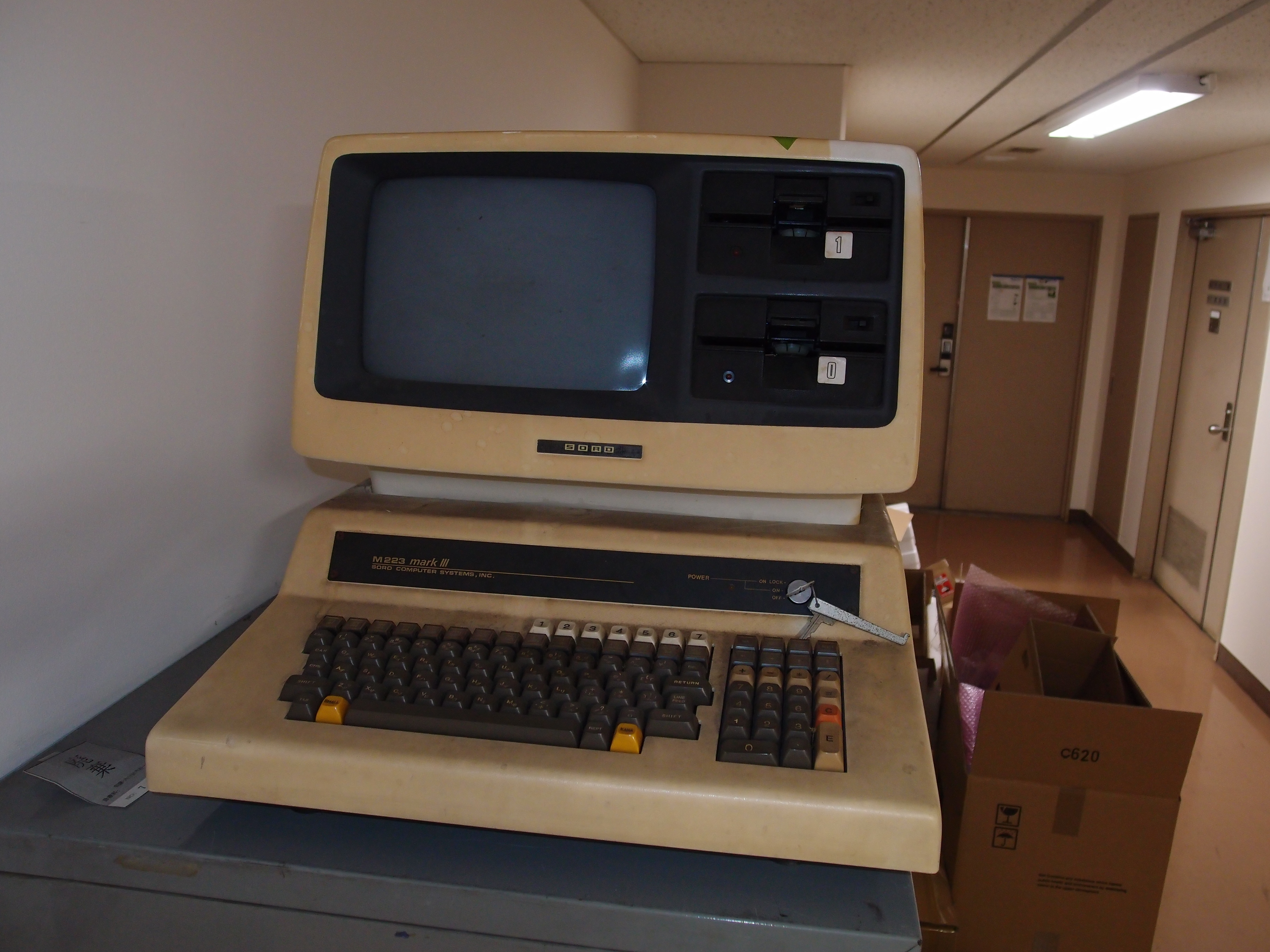
Sord M223 Mark III

- Sord SMP80/08, 1972
- Sord SMP80/x series, 1974
- Sord M200 Smart Home Computer, 1977
- Sord M223 series, 1980
- Sord M68, 1982
- Sord M5, 1982
- Sord M23P (1983), luggable
- Sord M685 Micro-mainframe, 1984
- Sord DF44H Floppy Disk Unit, 1984
- Sord M343SX-2 Multi-user computer, 1984
- Sord IS-11 (1984), notebook
- Full list of products of Sord Computer Corporation

== See also ==
- Kanji CP/M
