= Speed Racer (1995 video game) =

1995 video game

- Developer: Namco
- Publisher: Namco-America
- Composer: Shinji Hosoe
- Platform: Arcade
- Release: NA: October 7, 1995
- Genre: Racing
- Modes: Single-player, multiplayer
- Arcade system: Namco System FL

Speed Racer is an arcade racing game designed by Namco based on the popular Japanese anime Speed Racer. The standard cabinet was a two-player, sit-down model.

== Reception ==
A reviewer for Next Generation praised the use of "trickery" against racing opponents but criticized the track design, and concluded that "this is good kiddy gaming, and no more." He gave it two out of five stars.
