= Pro Tennis: World Court =

1988 video game

- Arcade flyer
- Developer: Namco
- Publishers: JP: Namco; NA: NEC Home Electronics
- Platforms: Arcade, TurboGrafx-16, X68000
- Release: Arcade: JP: October 1988; PC Engine/TurboGrafx-16: JP: August 11, 1988; NA: 1989
- Genres: Sports (tennis), role-playing
- Modes: Single-player, multiplayer
- Arcade system: Namco System 1

Pro Tennis: World Court (Note: Japanese: プロテニスワールドコート, Hepburn: Puro Tenisu: Wārudo Kōto) is a 1988 sports video game developed and published by Namco for arcades. It was released only in Japan in October 1988. It was inspired by the 1987 Famicom game Family Tennis. In August 1988, the game was converted to the PC Engine console, in which a new tennis-based role-playing quest mode was added, and was released for the North American TurboGrafx-16 console by NEC as World Court Tennis in 1989. Up to four players can play simultaneously.

An arcade sequel, Super World Court, was released in 1992. Hamster Corporation released the game as part of their Arcade Archives series for the Nintendo Switch and PlayStation 4 in May 2022.

== Gameplay ==
At the start of the game the players must select either "singles" (Player 1 v Player 2) or "doubles" (Player Team v CPU Team); they must then select one of twenty different players (ten male, eight female and two robot) before selecting one of three different courts (New York City hard, London lawn, and Paris clay). They must then select whether they want the match to be one or three sets long - and, once they have done so, their two (or four) chosen players will come out, and take their positions on the court. The players must use an eight-way joystick to direct their chosen players around their half of the court and two buttons to hit the ball with their rackets, but just like in a real tennis match, faults, net balls and deuce can occur, although the "Deuce" setting in the options menu can be turned off.

== Reception ==
The game received positive reviews from critics. Computer and Video Games magazine reviewed the PC Engine version, rating it 94% in 1989 and stating up to "four players can play simultaneously in this utterly incredible tennis game" with "huge lasting appeal". ACE magazine reviewed the PC Engine version in 1989, rating it 935 out of 1000 and listing it as the third best game available for the console, after R-Type and Final Lap Twin. They said World Tennis was "the PC Engine at its sporting best" and that it "has everything" including "superb" graphics, top spin, drop shots, volleys, convincing "3D screen separation" and "an arcade adventure" mode.

== See also ==
- Final Lap Twin
- Inazuma Eleven
- Racing role playing games
