= Sord M5 =

Home computer

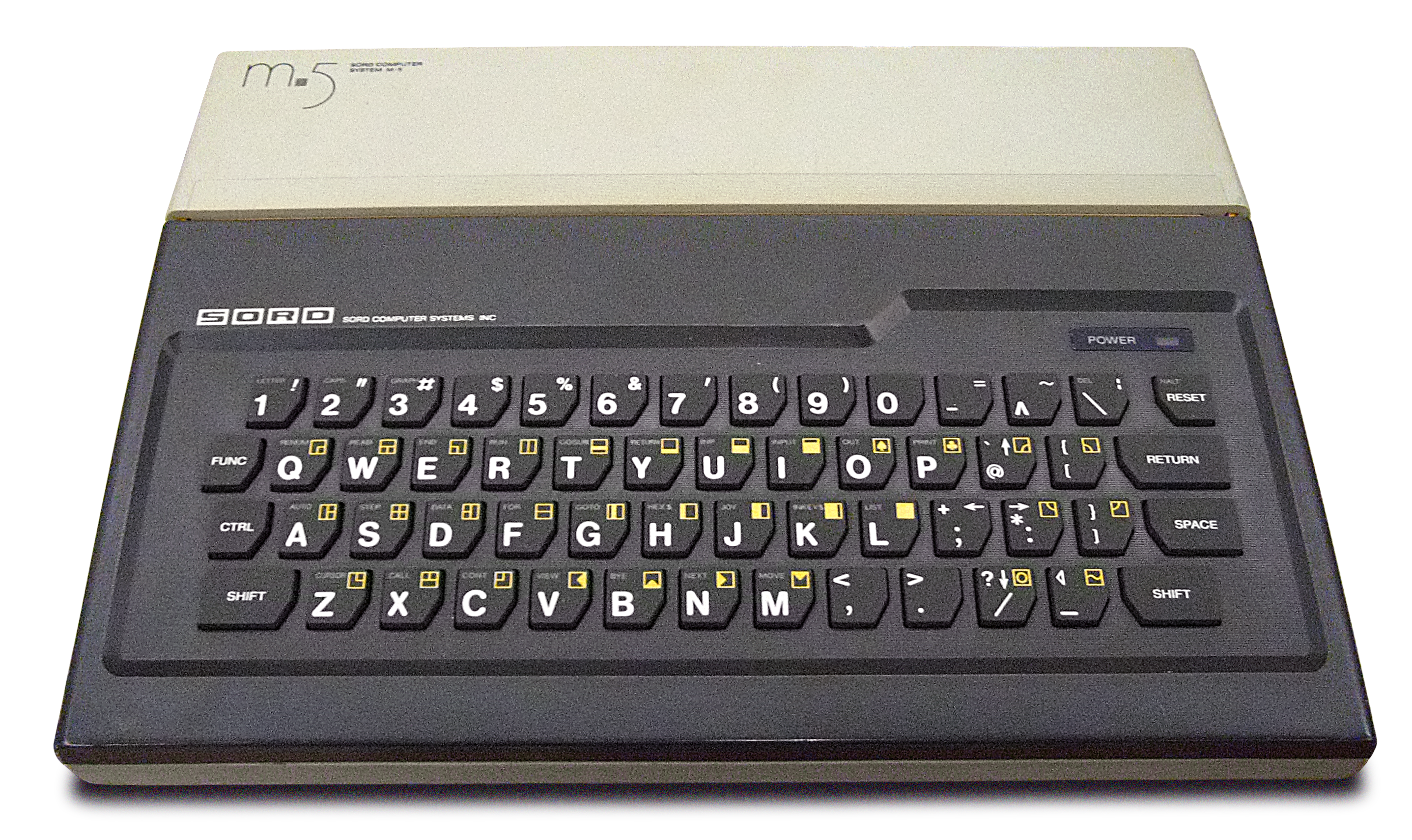
- Sord M5
- Developer: Sord Computer Corporation
- Released: November 1982
- Introductory price: ¥49,800 £195 ₩266,200
- Operating system: BASIC-F, BASIC-G, BASIC-I
- CPU: Zilog Z80A @ 3.58MHz
- Memory: 4 KB RAM, 16 KB VRAM
- Storage: Cartridges, Cassette tape
- Display: 256×192, 16 colours
- Graphics: TMS9918
- Sound: SN76489
- Connectivity: Centronics 16-pin interface

The Sord M5 is a home computer launched by Sord Computer Corporation in 1982. Primarily the Sord M5 competed in the Japanese home computer market. It was also sold as the CGL M5 in the United Kingdom by Computer Games Limited and was reasonably popular in Czechoslovakia, where the M5 was one of the first affordable computers available to the general public. Takara also sold models in Japan as the Game M5, and models were also exported to South Korea.

Original models of the Sord M5 are relatively small by home computing standards, with a built-in keyboard with rubber keys, similar to the ZX Spectrum, which is also sold in many countries such as the United Kingdom itself, Ireland, Spain, the Netherlands, Singapore, Malaysia, Sweden, Norway, Denmark, Canada, New Zealand, Australia, Greece, Turkey, Israel and Hong Kong as the Sord M5 Creative Computer, which included a carrying case for the computer. The specifications of the computer are very similar to the MSX, a computer that likely forced the Sord M5 (along with many similar Japanese computers) out of the market by the mid-1980s.

The CGL M5 was released in the UK with an introductory price of £195, higher than many of the system's competitors including the ZX Spectrum, and VIC-20. Whereas the M5 contained a cartridge slot in an age where most computers were using compact cassettes or floppy disks, the small amount of built-in RAM led to few games being produced for the system.

In South Korea, three electronics companies released different personal computers based on Sord M5. The FC-150 was produced and released by LG, Samsung released the SPC-500, and the TommyCom was manufactured and launched by Koryo Systems. These computers supported the Korean alphabet, Hangul. The system specifications of these computers were identical to the original M5, but they had differently shaped cartridge slots. Cartridges from the Sord M5 or other manufacturers could not be used for these computers directly. LG released some original software including several educational programs and games.

Despite its short production run, the M5 was supported by various big Japanese game developers such as Namco and Konami.

Other models include the M5 Pro and M5 Jr.

== Technical specifications ==
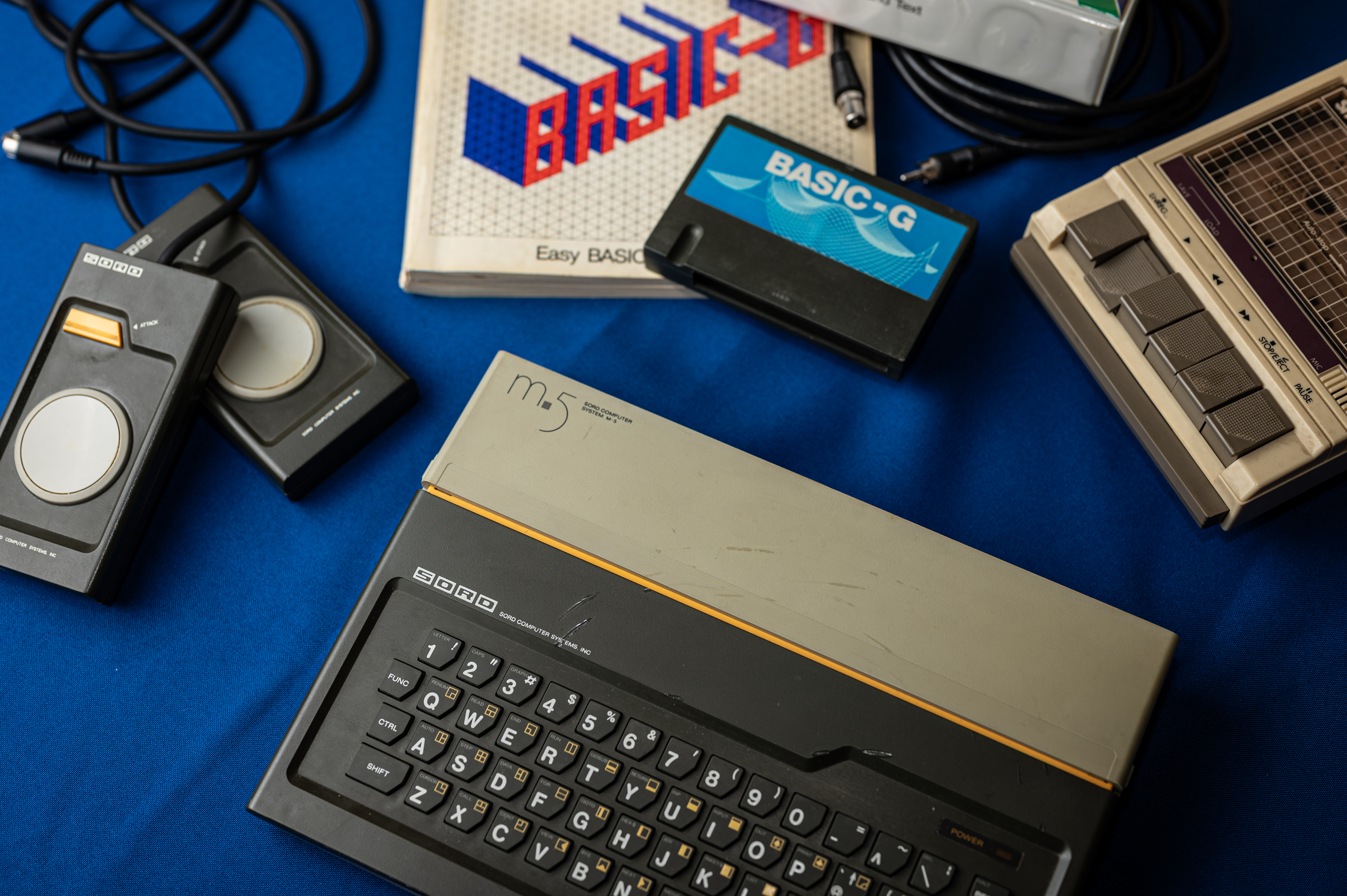
Sord M5 computer and accessories

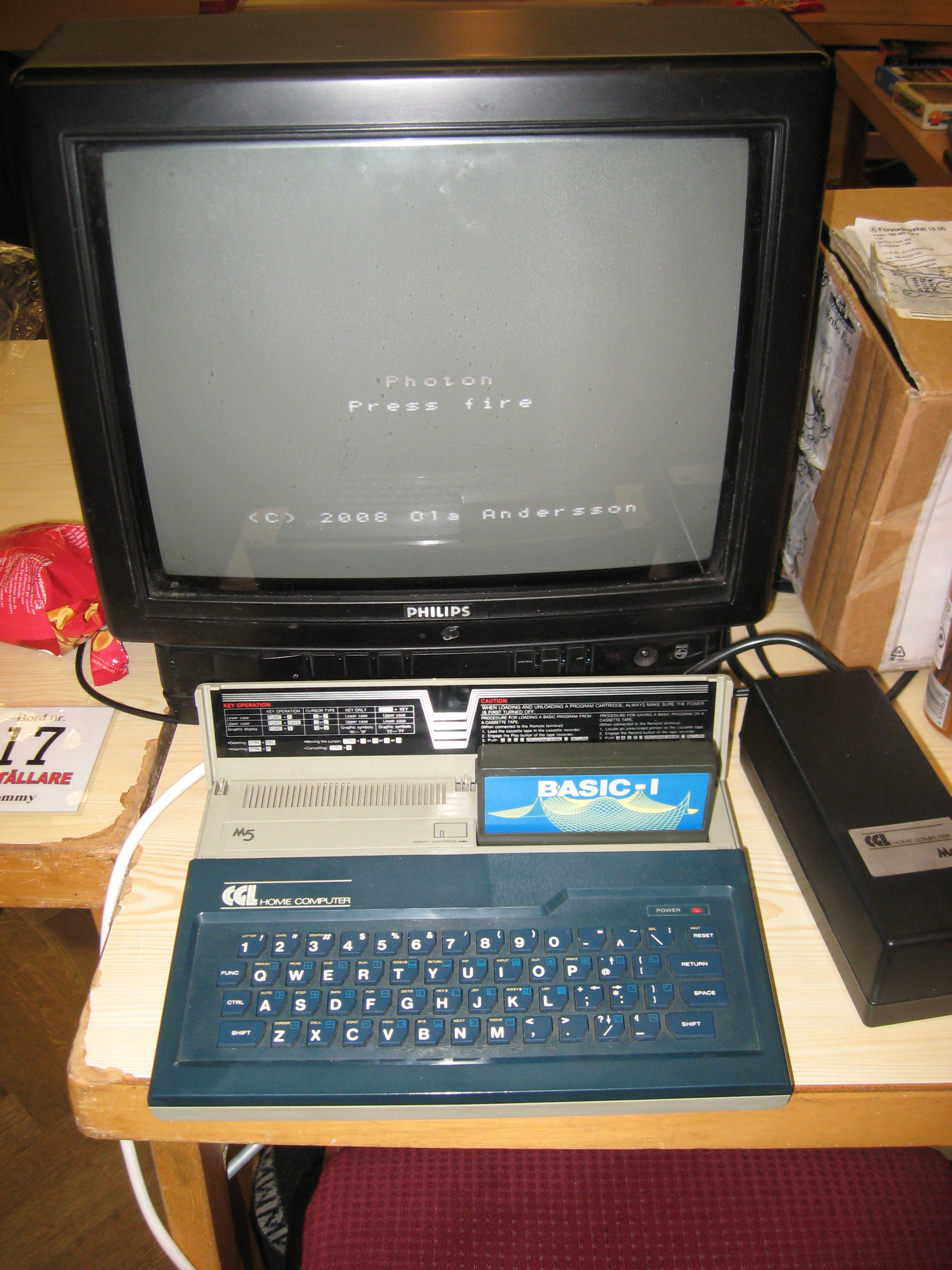
CGL M5

=== Internal hardware ===
- CPU: Zilog Z80, 3.58 MHz
- Video Hardware: TMS9918
  - 40×24 text (6×8 characters), 224 user defined characters
  - 256×192 graphics, 16 colours
  - 32 hardware sprites (up to 16×16 pixels)
- Sound Hardware: SN76489
  - 3 sound channels
  - 1 noise channel
  - 6 octaves, 15 amplitude levels
- RAM: 4 KB RAM, 16 KB VRAM
- ROM: 8 KB expandable to 16KB

=== I/O ports and power supply ===
- I/O ports:
  - TV out
  - Video out (phono socket)
  - Sound out (phono socket)
  - Centronics 16-pin interface
  - 8-pin DIN cassette connector
- Power supply: external

=== Language cartridge options ===
- BASIC-I
  - Integer arithmetic only (16 bit signed)
- BASIC-G
  - Graphics and sound functions
- BASIC-F
  - Floating point arithmetic
- FALC
  - Applications package

=== Retail price ===
- UK Retail prices, December 1983
  - Sord M5 plus BASIC-I : £190
  - BASIC-G : £35
  - BASIC-F : £35
  - FALC: £35

== Software ==
There are 42 known games for Sord M5

Title	Publisher
3D Squash / Touchdown	Takara
Adidas Lucky Shoot	Unknown
Apploon	Takara
Baseball	Takara
Blackjack / Slot Machine	Sord
Bosconian	Takara
Cowboy / Barricade	Takara
Dig Dug	Takara
Dragon Attack	Sord
Dream Shopper	Sord
Drops	SPC Soft
Eskimon	Takara
Fruit Search	Takara
Funny Mouse	Sord
Galaga (AKA Galax)	Sord / Takara
Heavy Boxing	Sord
Jogging / Sidewinder	Takara
Jong Kyou	Sord
Jumping Jack	SPC Soft
Last Day Of The Earth / Mini Star Trek	Sord
Loco-Motion (AKA Guttang Gottong)	Sord / Takara
Mappy	Takara
Moon Patrol	Takara
Pit Chaser	Sord
Pooyan	Konami
Real Tennis	Takara
Snaky / Barrier Attack	Sord
Solar System Forces	Takara
Solar System Forces - Commando Team	Takara
Solar System Forces - Operation Maul	Takara
Solar System Forces - Victory of Mars	Takara
Step Up	Sord
Super Cobra	Konami
Super Pac-Man (AKA Power Pac)	Sord / Takara
Tank Battalion	Sord
Three Circles / Number Search	Sord
Up Up Balloon	Sord
Warp Warp	Takara
Wheels	CGL
Wonder Hole	Irem
Wordmaze	Sord
