= Atomic Betty (video game) =

2005 video game

- North American cover art featuring three of the main protagonists: Sparky, Betty, and X-5
- Developers: Big Blue Bubble; Breakthrough New Media
- Publishers: NA: Namco Hometek; EU: Atari Europe
- Directors: Mike Kasprzak (technical); Mark Maia (creative)
- Programmers: Claudette Critchley (lead); Vedran Klanac
- Artist: Jeff Edwards
- Composer: Tomislav Slogar
- Platform: Game Boy Advance
- Release: NA: October 25, 2005; EU: Summer 2006
- Genres: Puzzle, Action
- Mode: Single-player

Atomic Betty is a 2005 puzzle action video game developed by Big Blue Bubble and Breakthrough New Media and published by Namco Hometek for the Game Boy Advance. Based on the Canadian animated television series by the same name, the game takes place both on Earth and in space. The player controls five characters from the show to defeat the villain Maximus IQ.

The developers aimed to include fan-favorite characters with a focus on teamwork. Atomic Betty was promoted at the 2005 Electronic Entertainment Expo and had a sweepstakes giveaway after its release in North America. The next year, Atari released the game in Europe through a new partnership with Namco Bandai.

Critical reception to the game was mixed. Praise focused on the visuals and the easy-to-pick-up gameplay, which was often compared to the 1993 puzzle-platform game The Lost Vikings. Common criticism included the limited audio and gameplay that was geared towards a younger audience and lacked replay value.

== Gameplay ==
The player must switch between different characters in the group to solve environmental puzzles. Betty (in her civilian clothes) and Noah work together to traverse the school's basement. Character information appears in the top left corner.

Atomic Betty is a single player puzzle action game based on the animated television series originally produced by Atomic Cartoons, featuring the titular Betty and her Earth friends, Noah and Paloma, as well as her space crew, Sparky and X-5. Betty must thwart the evil plans of the story's space villain, Maximus I.Q., while contending with the machinations of Betty's bully classmate Penelope on Earth. Stages are set both in Betty's school on Earth and in space.

During stages, the player navigates environmental puzzles to reach stage objectives by switching between Betty and her two companions. In addition to basic directional movements and jumping, each character has a special skill that is needed to overcome select obstacles in the stages. For example, Paloma is able to traverse under objects and X-5 can use a jetpack to fly. Betty can use gadgets that grant special abilities; new gadgets become available as the player progresses through the space worlds. Additionally, the end of each game world features a boss battle. Between stages, cutscenes provide details about the story. Atomic Betty also includes action-based gameplay segments throughout the game: ship mode and minigames. Ship mode has the player navigating Betty's spaceship while avoiding asteroids and attacking enemies. Minigames will occur as the player completes small objectives in stages and include shooting a basketball into a hoop and navigating X-5 through computer themed obstacles.

== Development and release ==
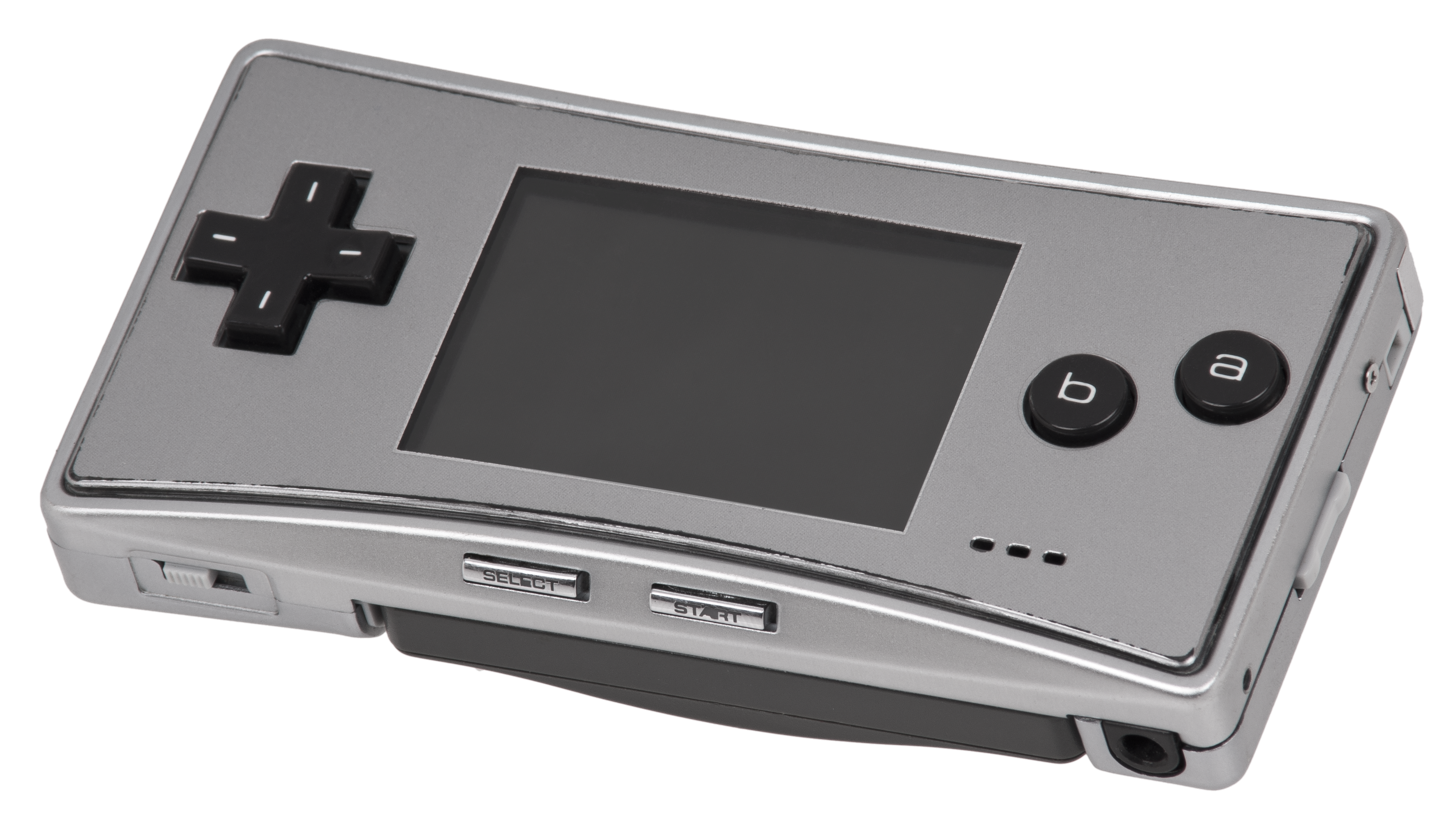
Big Blue Bubble developed Atomic Betty exclusively for the Game Boy Advance handheld console. The game released a month after the Game Boy Micro variant of the handheld (pictured) and was promoted with it in a sweepstakes.

Development was handled by Big Blue Bubble, a development team consisting of former employees at DICE Canada. Breakthrough New Media, a division of the animated show's production company, Breakthrough Films & Television, helped develop the game. Mike Kasprzak and Mark Maia were the game's respective technical and creative directors. Claudette Critchley and Vedran Klanac programmed the game while Jeff Edwards created its artwork. The music was composed by Tomislav Slogar. The development team included fan-favorite characters in the game and aimed to use the characters' special skills in unique ways. Teamwork in overcoming obstacles and opponents was also a focus for the gameplay.

In April 2005, Namco Hometek, the North American division of Japanese video game publisher Namco, announced that they would publish Atomic Betty in November of that year. The game was showcased at E3 2005 in May. Representatives were present promoting the game at the preshow event, and a single-level demonstration was available to play at the convention event. To help market the game, Namco released screenshots on August 8, 2005, ahead of the scheduled release. Atomic Betty went gold on October 11, 2005.

Although the game was originally scheduled to release in November 2005, it was published a month earlier in October. The release coincided with the animated show receiving two nominations for the 20th Gemini Awards. After the release, Namco announced a sweepstakes with Nintendo to further promote the game. Prizes included a week-long Space Camp at the U.S. Space & Rocket Center and copies of Atomic Betty as well as prize packs that consisted of a Game Boy Micro and the game. The sweepstakes website also included an online challenge game. In May 2006, Atari Europe announced that it entered a publishing deal with Namco Bandai to release several Game Boy Advance and Nintendo DS titles in Europe, including Atomic Betty. These titles were planned for release in summer 2006. The title was eventually released in Europe on August 25, 2006.

== Reception ==
Reception

Aggregate score
Aggregator	Score
Metacritic	62/100

Review scores
Publication	Score
GameDaily	6/10
GameZone	6/10
Nintendo World Report	6.5/10
Jeuxvideo	10/20
Mobile Gamer	4/10

Prior to the game's release, staff at GameSpot and IGN drew gameplay comparisons to the puzzle-platform game The Lost Vikings. In a preview, staff for Russian magazine Strana Igr drew a similar comparison, noting that the developers could have instead easily made a "banal" licensed game. They commented that the developers had time to fine tune Atomic Betty before its scheduled release, but acknowledged that children would be indifferent to the subtle polish and adults would likely overlook a game based on a children's cartoon.

After publication, Atomic Betty received "mixed or average" reviews according to review aggregator Metacritic. In terms of audiovisuals, the game's graphics—particularly the animation—were consistently reviewed favorably whereas the audio was not. Michael Lafferty of GameZone called the graphics "solid" and praised the animation but described the music as "minimal and repetitious". Writing for Nintendo World Report, Ben Kosmina also praised the animations, noting that despite the graphics being "fairly basic" they match the show's visual style. Conversely, he called the music "tepid" and the opening theme song "grainy" and "digitized". GameDaily reviewer Robert Workman echoed similar comments, praising the visuals while calling the audio "somewhat limited".

Reception towards the gameplay was mixed; while the ease of play was seen as a positive, reviewers noted that it also lacked replay value. In describing the gameplay as simple with an easy difficulty, Lafferty felt that it succeeded at being entertaining for its target audience despite being a "short-lived experience". He summarized his review saying that the game "does nothing to advance the genre" but is "a good fit in the 2-D platform style". Kosmina compared the gameplay to The Lost Vikings sans the frustrating deaths. He bemoaned the use of passwords to save progress, writing that the practice is outdated for modern games. Workman overall rated Atomic Betty "mediocre". He noted that the combination of the different genres would please some players and that fans of the show will enjoy the game whereas others "may grow slightly bored".

European media rated the game less favorably. A reviewer for Jeuxvideo also praised the quality of the graphics and animation. They called the gameplay interesting and easy to learn, but criticized the collision detection during combat, the simple audio, and the lack of replay value. German magazine Mobile Gamer staff described Atomic Betty as "bland" and compared it negatively to its source material. In reviewing the gameplay, they called the controls imprecise and referred to the game as a "weak imitation" of The Lost Vikings.
