= Turbo Force =

1991 video game

- North American arcade flyer
- Developer: Video System
- Publishers: JP: Namco; NA: Mc O' River
- Platform: Arcade
- Release: JP/NA: July 1991
- Genre: Scrolling shooter
- Modes: Single-player, multiplayer

Turbo Force (Note: Japanese: ターボフォース, Hepburn: Tābo Fōsu) is a 1991 vertically scrolling shooter video game developed by Video System and published by Namco for arcades. It was released in Japan in July 1991 and in North America the same month by Video System's division Mc O' River.

Hamster Corporation acquired the game's rights alongside Video System's properties, releasing the game as part of their Arcade Archives series for the Nintendo Switch and PlayStation 4 in March 2023.

== Gameplay ==
In Turbo Force, up to three players can control air force pilots who accidentally time traveled to the future in their vehicles, which are reworked into fighter planes to defeat legions of planes, tanks and mechs. The player can release a stream of ammunition to defeat enemies while dodging projectiles. There is no bomb attack, but power-ups can change the player's attack patterns or immediately defeat all enemies on the screen. Boss enemies appear frequently, sending waves of ammunition in the manner of bullet hell games. The final boss of the game is a generic Lexus LS 400, which humorously shoots Lexus logos to attack the player.
