= Navarone (video game) =

1980 video game

- Developer: Namco
- Publisher: Namco
- Designers: Shigeru Yokoyama; Shigeichi Ishimura
- Programmer: Shuichi Nakatome
- Platform: Arcade
- Release: JP: February 1980
- Genre: Fixed shooter
- Modes: Single-player, multiplayer
- Arcade system: Namco Warp & Warp

Navarone (Note: Japanese: ナバロン, Hepburn: Nabaron) is a 1980 fixed shooter video game developed and published by Namco for arcades. Released only in Japan in February 1980, it is one of Namco's last monochromatic video games. Hamster Corporation released the game outside Japan for the first time as part of their Arcade Archives series for the Nintendo Switch and PlayStation 4 in March 2023.

== Gameplay ==
The player controls a boat which must move around the edge of an island trying to shoot the pellets, mines and central skull for points while avoiding the bullets fired at it by the indestructible gun turrets. Should it get hit by one, it will lose a life, but once it has cleared the island, the remaining time will be added to its score (in 100-point increments), and it will proceed to the next round.
