= Final Lap Twin =

1989 video game

- Japanese box art
- Developer: Nova
- Publishers: JP: Namco; NA: NEC
- Composer: Katsuhiro Hayashi
- Platform: PC Engine/TurboGrafx-16
- Release: JP: July 7, 1989; NA: February 1990
- Genre: Racing RPG
- Modes: Single-player, multiplayer

Final Lap Twin (ファイナルラップツイン, Fainaru Rappu Tsuin) is a hybrid racing/role-playing game developed by Nova and published by Namco. Released for the Japanese PC Engine in 1989 and the North American TurboGrafx-16 in 1990, it is a spin-off to the 1987 arcade game Final Lap.

== Gameplay ==
The story mode featured in the game revolves around a young driver who desires to live up to the reputation of his racing-champion father. He travels around the map, meeting small-time racers, and must race his car to earn money that he spends on upgrading his car, eventually facing the local racing champion. After beating the rest of the local racing champions in the various cities, the player character must go through a maze to find the final upgrades of the different parts of his car, and then face the world racing champion.

== Reception ==
Reception

Review score
Publication	Score
Electronic Gaming Monthly	7/10, 7/10, 4/10, 6/10

ACE magazine reviewed the game in October 1989, rating it 940 out of 1000 and listing it as one of the top two best games available for the console, along with R-Type.
