= Tank Force =

1991 video game

- Arcade flyer
- Developer: Namco
- Publisher: Namco
- Designer: Yutaka Kounoe
- Platform: Arcade
- Release: JP: December 1991
- Genre: Multidirectional shooter
- Modes: Single-player, multiplayer

Tank Force (Note: Japanese: タンクフォース, Hepburn: Tanku Fōsu) is a 1991 multidirectional shooter video game developed and published by Namco for arcades. It was released only in Japan in December 1991. It was designed by Yutaka Kounoe, whose works include Dig Dug, Lucky & Wild, and Point Blank. The game is a sequel to Namco's Battle City (1985), itself a successor to Tank Battalion (1980). The game was re-released on the Wii's Virtual Console service in 2009. In 2017, the two-player version was re-released for the Nintendo Switch as part of the Namco Museum compilation. Hamster Corporation also released the game as part of their Arcade Archives series for the Nintendo Switch and PlayStation 4 in January 2023.

== Gameplay ==
The gameplay is much like that of Tank Battalion, except that this time up to two (on an upright model) or four (on a cocktail) players can play simultaneously. There are seven new types of enemy tanks (Normal Tanks, Speed Tanks, Hard Tanks, Big Tanks, Rapid Tanks, Tomahawk Tanks and Jeeps) and fifteen types of powerups (Bonus 500, 1000, 2000 and 3000, Shot Powerup, 4-Way Shot, Hyper Shot, Ripple Laser, Twin Shot, Small, Shield, Bomb Attack, Timer Stop, Force Field and Extend) which appear for players to collect in order to increase their tanks' firepower and boost their score. The enemies also roll into view from the top of the screen instead of just appearing and can also enter from the left and right sides. Every fourth round is a "boss" round where the players must fight Train Cannons, AK Tanks and Boss Cannons at the top of the screen as well as the round's regular enemies. The players cannot destroy their own headquarters walls, when one player shoots another they will be pushed back. The game has an ending which will be seen after clearing all thirty-six rounds.

== Reception ==
Game Machine reported that Tank Force was the fourth most-popular arcade game of February 1992.

In his review for Namco Museum on the Nintendo Switch, Damien McFerran of Nintendo Life said that Tank Force made for an odd inclusion due to its obscurity, describing it as "Pac-Man with tanks and destructible environments".
