= Sord M23P =

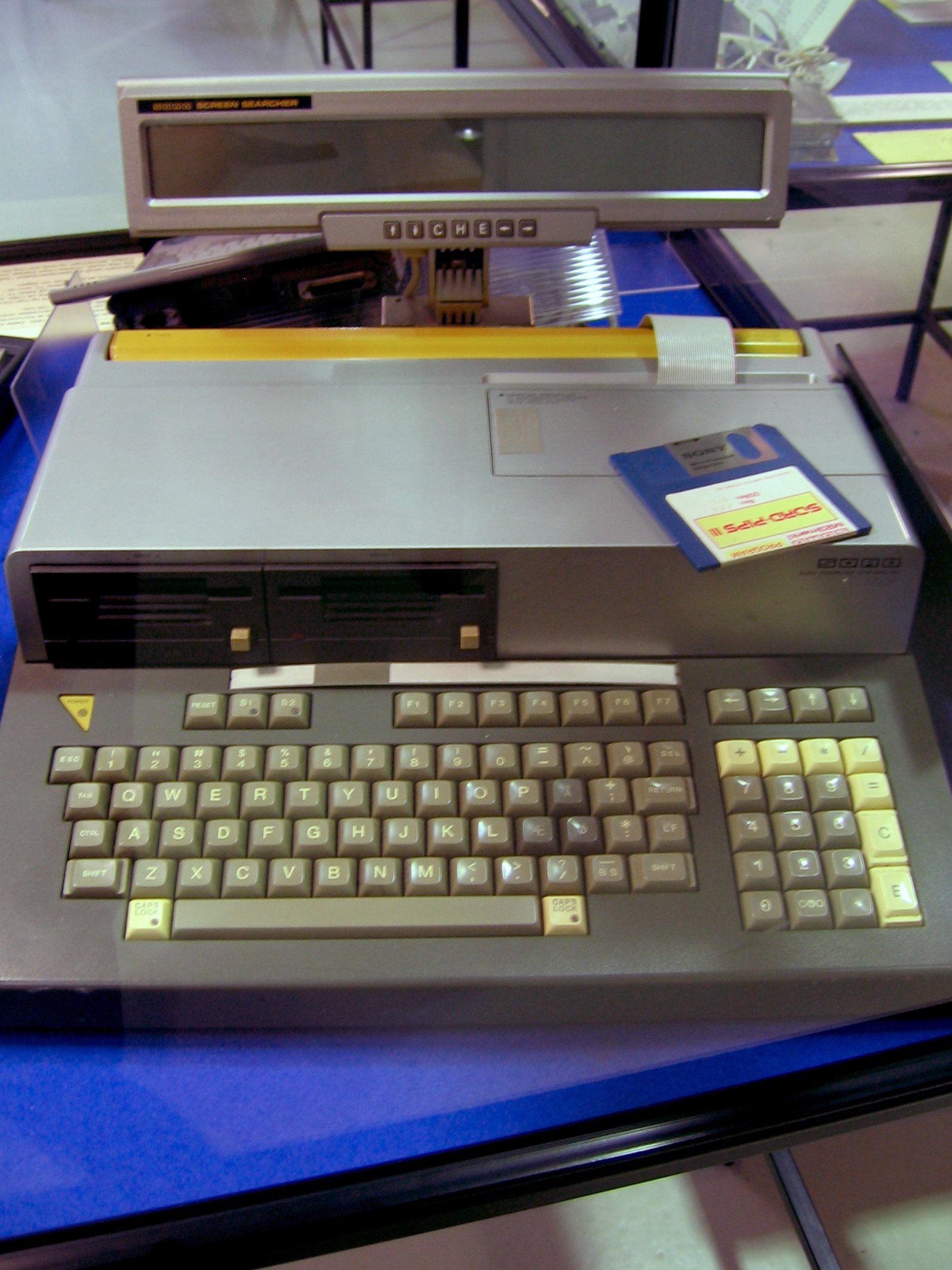
- Type: personal computer
- Released: 1983
- Operating system: Sord OS, SB80, CP/M 2.2
- CPU: Zilog Z80A @ 4.00 MHz
- Memory: 128 KiB

The Sord M23P was a "luggable" Japanese personal computer (weighed about 9 kg), manufactured by Sord Corp. from 1983. It was one of the first machines to use the 3½" disk drive produced by Sony.

== Technical specifications ==
CPU	Zilog Z80A @ 4.00 MHz
RAM	128 KiB
ROM	4 KiB
Keyboard	mechanic, 94 keys, number pad
Display	optional LCD, 80×8 lines, or conventional CRT monitor: text (80×25) and graphics (640×200 pixels), 8 colours.
Sound	internal speaker
Ports	2 RS-232C ports, 1 parallel port, 2 S-100 slots
Storage	2 3½" disk drives, 290 KiB each
