= Tank Battalion =

1980 video game

- North American arcade flyer
- Developer: Namco
- Publishers: JP: Namco; NA: Game Plan
- Designer: Shinichirou Okamoto
- Programmer: Kazukuni Hiraoka
- Series: Tank Battalion
- Platforms: Arcade, MSX, Sord M5
- Release: Arcade: JP: October 1980; NA: March 1981
- Genre: Multidirectional shooter
- Modes: Single-player, multiplayer

Tank Battalion (Note: Japanese: タンクバタリアン, Hepburn: Tanku Batarian) is a 1980 multidirectional shooter video game developed and published by Namco for arcades. It was released in North America by Game Plan. A home conversion of the game released for the Sord M5 and MSX. The game was followed up by two sequels: Battle City for the Famicom in 1985 and Tank Force for arcades in 1991.

== Gameplay ==
The player destroying an enemy tank.

The player, controlling a tank, must destroy twenty enemy tanks in each round, which enter the playfield from the top of the screen. The enemy tanks attempt to destroy the player's base (represented on the map as an eagle) as well as the player tank itself. A round is cleared when the player destroys all twenty enemy tanks, but the game ends if the player's base is destroyed or they run out of lives.

== Reception ==
Cash Box believed that "the real excitement" of Tank Battalion lied within its ability to modify the level design by destroying the brick walls.

Retrospectively in 2015, a writer for Beep! enjoyed the Sord M5 version for its improvements over the arcade original, such as the smoother movement of the player's tank, but disliked the squashed-looking graphics and narrow playing space. While the writer believed the MSX version was superior, they still recommended the M5 version for Namco fans and collectors.

== Legacy ==
A theme based on the game for Pac-Man 99 was released as free post-launch DLC, featuring visuals and sounds from the game.

Hamster Corporation released the game as part of their Arcade Archives series for the Nintendo Switch and PlayStation 4 in March 2024.
