= Panic Park =

1998 video game

- Developer(s): Namco
- Publisher(s): Namco
- Designer(s): Shigeki Toyama
- Platform(s): Arcade
- Release: JP: May 1998; NA: September 1998; EU: 1998
- Genre(s): Party
- Mode(s): Single-player, multiplayer

Panic Park (Note: Japanese: パニックパーク, Hepburn: Panikku Pāku) is an arcade game developed and published by Namco in 1998, and released on the arcade system board Namco System 23 in dedicated cabinets with 33" or 50" monitors.

== Gameplay ==
The game's unique controls are two horizontally moving levers, one for each player. Both levers move in an arc across the front of the game, but will collide when they are close together. The levers cause players to physically push each other aside as they direct their characters to collide on-screen, literally impeding each other's progress.

== Reception ==
Reception

Review scores
Publication	Score
Hyper	9/10
Player One	86%

In Japan, Game Machine listed Panic Park in their July 1, 1998 issue as being the third most popular arcade game at the time.
