= 1987 in video games =

1987 saw many sequels and prequels in video games, such as Castlevania II: Simon's Quest, Dragon Quest II, Final Lap, and Zelda II, along with new titles such as After Burner, Contra, Double Dragon, Final Fantasy, Mega Man, Metal Gear, Operation Wolf, Phantasy Star, Shinobi, Street Fighter and The Last Ninja. The Legend of Zelda was also introduced outside of Japan.

The year's highest-grossing arcade game worldwide was Sega's Out Run. The year's best‑selling home system was the Nintendo Entertainment System (Famicom) for the fourth year in a row. The best-selling 1987 home video game release in Japan was Dragon Quest II: Akuryō no Kamigami, while the year's best-selling home video games in Western markets were The Legend of Zelda in the United States and Out Run in the United Kingdom.

== Financial performance ==
=== Highest-grossing arcade games ===
The year's highest-grossing arcade game worldwide was Sega's Out Run.

==== Japan ====
The following titles were the highest-grossing arcade games of 1987 in Japan, according to the annual Gamest and Game Machine charts.

Rank	Gamest			Game Machine		
Rank	Title	Cabinet	Points	Title	Cabinet	Points
1	Out Run	Large	33	Out Run	Deluxe	3734
2	R-Type	Table	26	Arkanoid	Table	3118
3	After Burner	Large	20	Hi Sho Zame (Flying Shark)	Table	2434
4	1943: The Battle of Midway	Table	12	Major League	Table	2285
5	Double Dragon	Table	10	World Cup (Tehkan World Cup)	Table	2210
6	Darius	Large	8	Bubble Bobble	Table	2041
7	Dragon Spirit	Table	7	Super Hang-On	Ride-on	1901
8	Hi Sho Zame (Flying Shark); Yokai Dochuki	Table	5	Double Dragon	Table	1890
9	Hi Sho Zame (Flying Shark); Yokai Dochuki	Table	5	1943: The Battle of Midway	Table	1778
10	Super Hang-On	Large	4	Side Pocket	Table	1744

==== United Kingdom ====
In the United Kingdom, Out Run was the most successful arcade game of the year. The following titles were the top-grossing games on the monthly arcade charts in 1987.

Month	Title	Manufacturer	Genre	Ref
February	Out Run	Sega	Racing	
March	Out Run	Sega	Racing	
April	Bubble Bobble	Taito	Platformer	
May	Bubble Bobble	Taito	Platformer	
June	Bubble Bobble	Taito	Platformer	
July	Double Dragon	Taito	Beat 'em up	
August	Double Dragon	Taito	Beat 'em up	
September	After Burner	Sega	Combat flight sim	
October	Operation Wolf	Taito	Light gun shooter	
November	1942	Capcom	Scrolling shooter	
December	Operation Wolf	Taito	Light gun shooter	
1987	Out Run	Sega	Racing	

==== United States ====
In the United States, the following titles were the highest-grossing arcade video games of 1987.

Rank	Play Meter	AMOA	
Rank	Play Meter	Dedicated cabinet	Conversion kit
1	Out Run	Out Run	Arkanoid
2	Unknown	Contra, Double Dragon, Rolling Thunder	Ikari Warriors, Rastan, Top Gunner, World Series
3	Unknown	Contra, Double Dragon, Rolling Thunder	Ikari Warriors, Rastan, Top Gunner, World Series
4	Unknown	Contra, Double Dragon, Rolling Thunder	Ikari Warriors, Rastan, Top Gunner, World Series
5	Unknown	Unknown	Ikari Warriors, Rastan, Top Gunner, World Series

The following titles were the top-grossing games on the monthly RePlay arcade charts in 1987.

Month	Upright cabinet	Software kit	Ref
January	Out Run	Gauntlet II	
February	Out Run	Championship Sprint	

=== Best-selling home systems ===
Rank	System(s)	Manufacturer	Type	Generation	Sales			
Rank	System(s)	Manufacturer	Type	Generation	Japan	USA	EU	Worldwide
1	Nintendo Entertainment System / Famicom	Nintendo	Console	8-bit	1,780,000	3,000,000	300,000	5,080,000+
2	Commodore 64 (C64)	Commodore	Computer	8-bit	—N/a	—N/a	—N/a	1,500,000
3	Sega Mark III / Master System	Sega	Console	8-bit	280,000	500,000	155,000	935,000
4	IBM PS/2 (Model 30 / 50)	IBM	Computer	16-bit	—N/a	Unknown	Unknown	658,000
5	PC Engine (TurboGrafx-16)	NEC	Console	16-bit	600,000	—N/a	—N/a	600,000
6	Mac	Apple Inc.	Computer	16-bit	—N/a	—N/a	—N/a	550,000
7	NEC PC-88 / PC-98	NEC	Computer	8-bit / 16-bit	540,000	Unknown	Unknown	540,000+
8	Apple II	Apple Inc.	Computer	8-bit	—N/a	—N/a	—N/a	500,000
9	Atari ST	Atari Corp.	Computer	16-bit	—N/a	—N/a	—N/a	400,000
10	MSX	ASCII.	Computer	8-bit	340,000	Unknown	Unknown	340,000+

=== Best-selling home video games ===
==== Japan ====
In Japan, according to Famicom Tsūshin (Famitsu) magazine, the following titles were the top ten best-selling 1987 releases, including later sales up until mid-1989.

Rank	Title	Developer	Publisher	Genre	Platform	Sales
1	Dragon Quest II: Akuryō no Kamigami	Chunsoft	Enix	RPG	Famicom	2,400,000
2	Pro Yakyū: Family Stadium '87	Namco	Namco	Sports	Famicom	< 1,300,000
3	Moero!! Pro Yakyū (Bases Loaded)	TOSE	Jaleco	Sports	Famicom	< 1,000,000
4	Zelda 2: Link no Bōken (The Adventure of Link)	Nintendo R&D4	Nintendo	Action RPG	Famicom Disk System	Unknown
5	Family Computer Golf: Japan Course	Nintendo R&D2	Nintendo	Sports	Famicom	< 740,000
6	Saint Seiya: Ōgon Densetsu	Bandai	Bandai	Action RPG	Famicom	Unknown
7	Momotarō Densetsu (Momotarō Legend)	Hudson Soft	Hudson Soft	RPG	Famicom	Unknown
8	Nakayama Miho no Tokimeki High School	Squaresoft	Nintendo	Dating sim	Famicom Disk System	Unknown
9	Sanma no Meitantei (Great Detective Sanma)	Namco	Namco	Adventure	Famicom	Unknown
10	Famicom Mukashibanashi: Shin Onigashima	Nintendo R&D4	Nintendo	Adventure	Famicom Disk System	Unknown

The following titles were the best-selling home video games on the Japan game charts published by Famicom Tsūshin (Famitsu) and Family Computer Magazine (Famimaga) in 1987.

Chart	Week 1	Week 2	Week 3	Week 4	Ref
January	Pro Yakyū: Family Stadium (Famicom)		Zelda 2: Link no Bōken (Famicom Disk System)		
February	Dragon Quest II (Famicom)		Family Computer Golf: Japan Course (FC)	Unknown	
March	Unknown	Unknown	Unknown	Unknown	
April	Sanma no Meitantei (Famicom)		Argus no Senshi (Famicom)	Family Jockey (Famicom)	
May	Kinnikuman 2 (FDS)	Pro Yakyū: Family Stadium (Famicom)		Yūshi no Monshō (FDS)	
June	Bug-tte Honey (Famicom)	Family Boxing (Famicom)		Unknown	
July	Unknown	Unknown	Unknown	Unknown	
August	Unknown	Unknown	Saint Seiya: Ōgon Densetsu (Famicom)	Dracula II: Noroi no Fūin (FC)	
September	Shin Onigashima (Famicom Disk System)		Unknown	Unknown	
October	Unknown	Unknown	Side Pocket (Famicom)	Momotaro Densetsu (FC)	
November	Famicom Grand Prix: F-1 Race (FDS)	Unknown	Unknown	Unknown	
December	Pro Yakyū: Family Stadium '87 (Famicom)		Nakayama Miho no Tokimeki High School (Famicom Disk System)		

==== United Kingdom and United States ====
In the United States, The Legend of Zelda was the best-selling home video game of 1987, becoming the first third-generation video game (non-bundled) to cross a million US sales that year, followed by Mike Tyson's Punch-Out!! In the United Kingdom, Out Run was the best-selling home video game of 1987, with its 8-bit home computer ports becoming the fastest-selling games in the UK up until then.

The following titles were the top-selling home video games on the monthly charts in the United Kingdom and United States during 1987.

Month	United Kingdom			United States			
Month	All formats	ZX Spectrum	Sales	Title	Platform	Sales	Ref
January	Gauntlet	Olli & Lissa	Unknown	Unknown	Unknown	Unknown	
February	Unknown	Leader Board	Unknown	Unknown	Unknown	Unknown	
March	Unknown	Feud	Unknown	Unknown	Unknown	Unknown	
April	Unknown	Feud	Unknown	Unknown	Unknown	Unknown	
May	Unknown	BMX Simulator	Unknown	Unknown	Unknown	Unknown	
June	Unknown	Milk Race	Unknown	Unknown	Unknown	Unknown	
July	Unknown	Barbarian: The Ultimate Warrior	Unknown	The Legend of Zelda	NES	Unknown	
August	Unknown	Exolon	Unknown	The Legend of Zelda	NES	Unknown	
September	Renegade	Renegade	Unknown	The Legend of Zelda	NES	Unknown	
October	Unknown	Renegade	Unknown	The Legend of Zelda	NES	Unknown	
November	Unknown	Game Set and Match	Unknown	Mike Tyson's Punch-Out!!	NES	Unknown	
December	Out Run		250,000+	Mike Tyson's Punch-Out!!	NES	Unknown	
1987	Out Run		350,000	The Legend of Zelda	NES	1,000,000+	

== Top-rated games ==
=== Major awards ===
Award	Gamest Awards (Japan, December 1987)	2nd Famitsu Best Hit Game Awards (Japan, February 1988)	2nd Famimaga Game Awards (Japan, February 1988)	5th Golden Joystick Awards (United Kingdom, March 1988)
Award	Arcade	Console	Famicom	Computer
Game of the Year	Darius	Dragon Quest II (Famicom)		Out Run
Critics' Choice Awards	—N/a	Tsuppari Ōzumō (Famicom); Zombie Hunter (Famicom); Shin Onigashima (Famicom Disk System); Family Computer Golf (Famicom Disk System); Bubble Bobble (Famicom); Digital Devil Story: Megami Tensei (Famicom)	—N/a	—N/a
Best Game Design	—N/a	Nakayama Miho no Tokimeki High School (FDS)	—N/a	—N/a
Best Playability	—N/a	—N/a	Dragon Quest II	—N/a
Best Story	—N/a	Dragon Quest II (Yuji Horii)	—N/a	—N/a
Best Graphics	After Burner	Faxanadu (Famicom)	—N/a	—N/a
Best 3D Game	—N/a	Highway Star (Rad Racer)	—N/a	—N/a
Best Speech Synthesis	Genpei Tōma Den	—N/a	—N/a	—N/a
Best Music / Sound	Darius	Momotaro Densetsu / Exciting Billiards	Dragon Quest II	—N/a
Best Character / Character Design	Athena Asamiya (Psycho Soldier)	Momotaro Densetsu (Famicom)	Dragon Quest II	—N/a
Best Developer / Software House	Sega	—N/a	—N/a	U.S. Gold
Best Programmer	—N/a	—N/a	—N/a	Jon Ritman
Best Ports	—N/a	Wizardry / Salamander	—N/a	—N/a
Best Original Game / Originality	—N/a	—N/a	Dragon Quest II	Nebulus
Most Popular Game / Long Seller	Out Run	Pro Yakyū: Family Stadium (R.B.I. Baseball)	—N/a	—N/a
Arcade Game of the Year	—N/a	—N/a	—N/a	Out Run
Best Action Game	—N/a	Yume Kōjō: Doki Doki Panic (Famicom)	Zelda 2: Link no Bōken (FDS)	—N/a
Best Shooter	—N/a	Fantasy Zone (Famicom)	Salamander	—N/a
Best Adventure Game	—N/a	Hokkaidō Rensa Satsujin: Okhotsk ni Kiyu (FC)	Shin Onigashima (FDS)	The Guild of Thieves
Best RPG	—N/a	Dragon Quest II (Famicom)	Dragon Quest II	—N/a
Best Action RPG	—N/a	Zelda 2: Link no Bōken (FDS)	—N/a	—N/a
Best Sports Game	—N/a	Mike Tyson's Punch-Out! (Famicom)	Pro Yakyū: Family Stadium	—N/a
Best Puzzle Game	—N/a	Shanghai	—N/a	—N/a
Best Simulation / Strategy Game	—N/a	SD Gundam World Gachapon Senshi (Famicom)	—N/a	Vulcan
Best Leisure / Casual Games	—N/a	Mezase Pachi Pro: Pachio-kun / Side Pocket	—N/a	—N/a
Best Board Game	—N/a	Tetsudou Ou (Famicom)	—N/a	—N/a
Best Mahjong Game	—N/a	Professional Mahjong Gokū	—N/a	—N/a

=== Famitsu Platinum Hall of Fame ===
The following 1987 video game releases entered Famitsu magazine's "Platinum Hall of Fame" for receiving Famitsu scores of at least 35 out of 40.

Title	Platform	Score (out of 40)	Developer	Publisher	Genre
Dragon Quest II: Akuryō no Kamigami (Dragon Warrior II)	Family Computer (Famicom)	38	Chunsoft	Enix	RPG
Zelda 2: Link no Bōken (Zelda II: The Adventure of Link)	Famicom Disk System	36	Nintendo EAD	Nintendo	Action RPG

== Business ==
- New companies: Acclaim, Apogee, The Bitmap Brothers, Empire Interactive, GameTek, Maxis, Natsume Co., Ltd.
- Defunct: Electric Transit, English Software, Muse
- Electronic Arts acquires Batteries Included.
- Atari Games establishes the Tengen division for porting their games to home systems.
- Nintendo of America, Inc. v. Blockbuster Entertainment lawsuit: Nintendo sues Blockbuster for photocopying complete NES manuals for its rental games. Nintendo wins the suit, and Blockbuster includes original manuals with its rentals.
- SSI President Joel Billings acquires the license to the Dungeons & Dragons tabletop role-playing game, setting the stage for the Gold Box line of D&D games.

== Notable releases ==
=== Arcade ===
- February 20 – Konami releases Contra
- July 1 – Irem releases scrolling shooter R-Type.
- July – Technōs Japan releases Double Dragon to arcades, distributed internationally by Taito.
- August 30 – Capcom releases Street Fighter, the first game of the series.
- Taito releases Rastan and Operation Wolf.
- Namco releases Wonder Momo, which is their last 8-bit game, Yokai Dochuki, which is their first 16-bit game, Dragon Spirit, Blazer, Quester, Pac-Mania, Galaga '88 and Final Lap.
- Atari Games releases RoadBlasters, Xybots, and APB.

=== Home ===
- January 14 – Nintendo releases Zelda II: The Adventure of Link for the Famicom Disk System in Japan only. The game would go unreleased in America for nearly two years afterwards.
- February 12 – Infocom releases Bureaucracy from author Douglas Adams.
- May 1 – Konami releases Castlevania in North America.
- June 21 – Nihon Falcom releases Ys I: Ancient Ys Vanished for the PC-8801 in Japan only. The game's director is Masaya Hashimoto, and it is the first game in the long running Ys series.
- June – Codemasters release Dizzy – The Ultimate Cartoon Adventure
- July 1 – Nintendo releases Kid Icarus in North America.
- July 5 – the Leisure Suit Larry in the Land of the Lounge Lizards adventure is released by Sierra Entertainment.
- July 13 – Konami releases Metal Gear for MSX2 in Japan and Europe.
- August 15 – Nintendo releases Metroid in North America.
- August 22 – Nintendo releases The Legend of Zelda in America and Europe, a year after being available in Japan.
- August 28 – Konami releases Castlevania II: Simon's Quest in Japan, the second Castlevania title released for the NES/Famicom.
- October – Nintendo releases Mike Tyson's Punch-Out!! for NES/Famicom.
- October – LucasArts releases Maniac Mansion, the first game to use the SCUMM engine, innovating the point-and-click interface for the adventure game genre.
- November 14 – Sierra On-Line releases Space Quest II: Vohaul's Revenge, the second game in the Space Quest series.
- December 17 – Capcom releases the first Mega Man game in the long-standing series for the NES/Famicom.
- December 18 – Square's Hironobu Sakaguchi releases Final Fantasy for the Famicom in Japan. Originally intended to be the company's last release, the game's success resulted in a prolific series. It was released in the US 3 years later.
- December 20 – Sega releases Phantasy Star on the Master System, featuring a female protagonist.
- FTL Games releases Dungeon Master for the Atari ST.
- Sierra On-Line releases Police Quest: In Pursuit of the Death Angel, the first game in the Police Quest series.
- MIDI Maze for the Atari ST is a first person shooter allowing up to 16 computers to be networked via the built-in MIDI ports for deathmatch-style fights.
- Incentive Software releases Driller, a first person game using 3D filled polygons.
- Ocean Software releases Head Over Heels, an isometric action-adventure game, for several 8-bit home computers.
- MicroProse releases Sid Meier's Pirates!, the first game from Meier with his name in the title.
- System 3 releases The Last Ninja.
- Accolade releases Test Drive.

=== Hardware ===
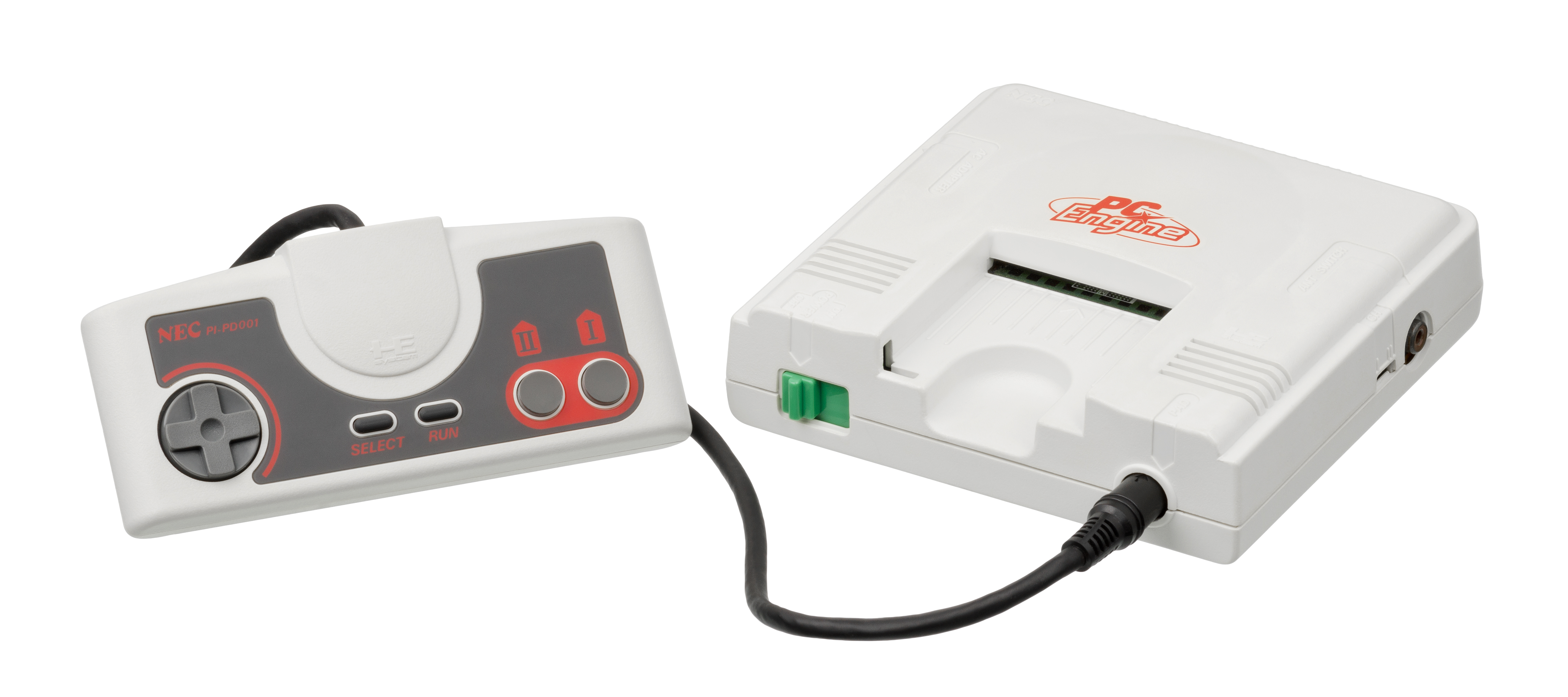
PC Engine

- March 28 – Sharp releases the X68000 in Japan.
- April – IBM launches the PS/2 line of computers which introduces VGA graphics and 3.5 inch floppy disk drives to PCs.
- September – Master System released in Europe.
- October 30 – NEC releases the PC Engine console in Japan, starting the fourth generation.
- Acorn releases the Acorn Archimedes 32-bit home computer, which brought the game Zarch (later known on other platforms as Virus) to prominence.
- Commodore releases the lower-cost Amiga 500 which became a significant gaming machine, particularly in Europe, and becomes the best-selling model.
- Atari Corporation releases the XE Game System, or Atari XEGS, a repackaged 65XE computer which is the last in the Atari 8-bit computer series.
- Master System is released in Japan.
- AdLib sets a de facto standard for PC audio with its Yamaha YM3812-based sound card.
- Namco develops the Namco System 1 arcade system board, followed later in the year by the Namco System 2.
- The IBM PCjr is discontinued after three years.

== See also ==
- 1987 in games
