= Famitsu scores =

Reviews by Japanese video game magazine

Famitsu logo

The Japanese video game magazine Famitsu reviews video games by having four critics each assign a score from 0 to 10, with 10 being the highest. The scores are added for a maximum possible score of 40. As of 2024, thirty games have received perfect scores.

Famitsu was first published in 1986, and gave its first perfect score in 1998 to The Legend of Zelda: Ocarina of Time, released by Nintendo for the Nintendo 64. Nintendo is the publisher with the highest number of perfect scoring games with ten total, followed by Square Enix with five, Sega with four and Konami with three. Nintendo is also the developer with the highest number of perfect scoring games with eight total, followed by Kojima Productions and Square Enix with four each.

The console with the highest number of perfect-scoring games is the PlayStation 3, with seven total. Four of the perfect-scoring games on PlayStation 3 were also released on the Xbox 360, which is tied with the Wii for the second-highest number of perfect scores, at five total. Video game franchises with multiple perfect scores include The Legend of Zelda with five, Metal Gear with three, and Dragon Quest, Final Fantasy and Like a Dragon with two. Of the games to receive perfect scores, only three were either published and/or developed by a non-Japanese company: The Elder Scrolls V: Skyrim, Grand Theft Auto V and Ghost of Tsushima.

== Reviews ==
=== Perfect scores ===
As of January 2024, thirty games have received perfect scores from Famitsu.

Title	Year	System	Developer	Publisher	Notes	Ref.
The Legend of Zelda: Ocarina of Time	1998	Nintendo 64	Nintendo	Nintendo		
Soulcalibur	1999	Dreamcast	Project Soul	Namco		
Vagrant Story	2000	PlayStation	Square	Square		
The Legend of Zelda: The Wind Waker	2003	GameCube	Nintendo	Nintendo		
Nintendogs	2005	Nintendo DS	Nintendo	Nintendo		
Final Fantasy XII	2006	PlayStation 2	Square Enix	Square Enix		
Super Smash Bros. Brawl	2008	Wii	Sora Ltd., Nintendo	Nintendo		
Metal Gear Solid 4: Guns of the Patriots	2008	PlayStation 3	Kojima Productions	Konami		
428: Shibuya Scramble	2008	Wii	Chunsoft	Sega	First and only visual novel to receive a perfect score.	
Dragon Quest IX: Sentinels of the Starry Skies	2009	Nintendo DS	Level-5, Square Enix	Square Enix		
Monster Hunter Tri	2009	Wii	Capcom	Capcom		
Bayonetta	2009	Xbox 360 (Note: Only the Xbox 360 version of the game received a perfect score; the PlayStation 3 version received a 38 out of 40.)	PlatinumGames	Sega		
New Super Mario Bros. Wii	2009	Wii	Nintendo	Nintendo		
Metal Gear Solid: Peace Walker	2010	PlayStation Portable	Kojima Productions	Konami		
Pokémon Black and White	2010	Nintendo DS	Game Freak	Nintendo, The Pokémon Company		
The Legend of Zelda: Skyward Sword	2011	Wii	Nintendo	Nintendo		
The Elder Scrolls V: Skyrim	2011	Xbox 360, PlayStation 3	Bethesda	Bethesda	First non-Japanese game to receive a perfect score	
Final Fantasy XIII-2	2011	Xbox 360, PlayStation 3	Square Enix	Square Enix		
Kid Icarus: Uprising	2012	Nintendo 3DS	Sora Ltd., Project Sora	Nintendo		
Yakuza 5	2012	PlayStation 3	Ryu Ga Gotoku Studio	Sega		
JoJo's Bizarre Adventure: All Star Battle	2013	PlayStation 3	CyberConnect2	Namco Bandai		
Grand Theft Auto V	2013	Xbox 360, PlayStation 3	Rockstar	Rockstar	Second non-Japanese game to receive a perfect score	
Metal Gear Solid V: The Phantom Pain	2015	Xbox 360, PlayStation 3, PlayStation 4, Xbox One	Kojima Productions	Konami		
The Legend of Zelda: Breath of the Wild	2017	Wii U, Nintendo Switch	Nintendo	Nintendo		
Dragon Quest XI: Echoes of an Elusive Age	2017	Nintendo 3DS, PlayStation 4	Square Enix	Square Enix		
Death Stranding	2019	PlayStation 4	Kojima Productions	Sony Interactive Entertainment		
Ghost of Tsushima	2020	PlayStation 4	Sucker Punch	Sony Interactive Entertainment	Third non-Japanese game to receive a perfect score	
The Legend of Zelda: Tears of the Kingdom	2023	Nintendo Switch	Nintendo	Nintendo		
Street Fighter 6	2023	PlayStation 4, PlayStation 5, Xbox Series X/S	Capcom	Capcom		
Like a Dragon: Infinite Wealth	2024	PlayStation 4, PlayStation 5, Xbox One, Xbox Series X/S	Ryu Ga Gotoku Studio	Sega		

=== Near-perfect scores ===
As of 2026, fifty-eight games have received a near-perfect score of 39.

Title	Year	System	Publisher	Notes	Ref.
The Legend of Zelda: A Link to the Past	1991	Super Famicom	Nintendo		
Virtua Fighter 2	1995	Sega Saturn	Sega		
Ridge Racer Revolution	1995	PlayStation	Namco		
Super Mario 64	1996	Nintendo 64	Nintendo		
Tekken 3	1998	PlayStation	Namco		
Cyber Troopers Virtual-On Oratorio Tangram	1999	Dreamcast	Sega		
Final Fantasy X	2001	PlayStation 2	Square		
Gran Turismo 3: A-Spec	2001	PlayStation 2	Sony Computer Entertainment		
Resident Evil	2002	GameCube	Capcom		
Dragon Quest VIII: Journey of the Cursed King	2004	PlayStation 2	Square Enix		
Gran Turismo 4	2004	PlayStation 2	Sony Computer Entertainment		
Kingdom Hearts II	2005	PlayStation 2	Square Enix		
Metal Gear Solid 3: Subsistence	2005	PlayStation 2	Konami		
Dead or Alive 4	2005	Xbox 360	Tecmo		
Ōkami	2006	PlayStation 2	Capcom		
The Legend of Zelda: Phantom Hourglass	2007	Nintendo DS	Nintendo		
Grand Theft Auto IV	2008	PlayStation 3, Xbox 360	Rockstar Games		
Call of Duty: Modern Warfare 2	2009	PlayStation 3, Xbox 360	Activision		
Final Fantasy XIII	2009	PlayStation 3	Square Enix		
Red Dead Redemption	2010	PlayStation 3, Xbox 360	Rockstar Games		
Naruto Shippuden: Ultimate Ninja Storm 2	2010	PlayStation 3, Xbox 360	Namco Bandai Games		
Call of Duty: Black Ops	2010	PlayStation 3, Xbox 360	Activision		
Monster Hunter Portable 3rd	2010	PlayStation Portable	Capcom		
L.A. Noire	2011	PlayStation 3, Xbox 360	Rockstar Games		
Tales of Xillia	2011	PlayStation 3	Namco Bandai Games		
Gears of War 3	2011	Xbox 360	Xbox Game Studios		
FIFA 12	2011	PlayStation 3, Xbox 360	Electronic Arts		
Final Fantasy Type-0	2011	PlayStation Portable	Square Enix		
Metal Gear Solid: Peace Walker - HD Edition	2011	PlayStation 3	Konami		
Call of Duty: Modern Warfare 3	2011	PlayStation 3, Xbox 360	Activision		
Resident Evil: Revelations	2012	Nintendo 3DS	Capcom		
Tekken Tag Tournament 2	2012	PlayStation 3, Xbox 360	Namco Bandai Games		
Resident Evil 6	2012	PlayStation 3, Xbox 360	Capcom		
Animal Crossing: New Leaf	2012	Nintendo 3DS	Nintendo		
Metal Gear Rising: Revengeance	2013	PlayStation 3	Konami		
Naruto Shippuden: Ultimate Ninja Storm 3	2013	PlayStation 3, Xbox 360	Namco Bandai Games		
The Wonderful 101	2013	Wii U	Nintendo		
Final Fantasy XIV: A Realm Reborn	2013	PlayStation 3	Square Enix		
Pokémon X and Y	2013	Nintendo 3DS	Nintendo		
Like a Dragon: Ishin!	2014	PlayStation 4	Sega		
Dragon Quest Heroes II: The Twin Kings and the Prophecy's End	2016	PlayStation 3, PlayStation 4, PlayStation Vita	Square Enix		
Uncharted 4: A Thief's End	2016	PlayStation 4	Sony Interactive Entertainment		
Persona 5	2016	PlayStation 3, PlayStation 4	Atlus		
Yakuza 6: The Song of Life	2016	PlayStation 4	Sega		
Nier: Automata	2017	PlayStation 4	Square Enix		
Super Mario Odyssey	2017	Nintendo Switch	Nintendo		
Monster Hunter: World	2018	PlayStation 4	Capcom		
Red Dead Redemption 2	2018	PlayStation 4	Rockstar Games		
Kingdom Hearts III	2019	PlayStation 4	Square Enix		
Final Fantasy VII Remake	2020	PlayStation 4	Square Enix		
The Last of Us Part II	2020	PlayStation 4	Sony Interactive Entertainment		
Elden Ring	2022	PlayStation 4, PlayStation 5, Xbox One, Xbox Series X/S	FromSoftware		
Splatoon 3	2022	Nintendo Switch	Nintendo		
Final Fantasy XVI	2023	PlayStation 5	Square Enix		
Monster Hunter Wilds	2025	PlayStation 5, Xbox Series X/S	Capcom		
Death Stranding 2: On the Beach	2025	PlayStation 5	Sony Interactive Entertainment		
Ghost of Yōtei	2025	PlayStation 5	Sony Interactive Entertainment		
Pokémon Pokopia	2026	Nintendo Switch 2	The Pokémon Company /Nintendo		

=== Lowest scores ===
The lowest score ever given out by Famitsu is 12 points out of 40. Only three games have received this score: Shura no Mon (Kodansha, PlayStation, 1998), Pachinko CR Daiku no Minamoto-San GB (Telenet Japan, Game Boy, 1998), and Pro Golfer Saru (Namco Bandai Games, Wii, 2008). Additionally, few games have received under 15 points; among the more recent of these are Ookuki (Global A Entertainment, PlayStation 2, 2008) receiving 13, and Appleseed EX (Sega, PlayStation 2, 2007), Beijing 2008 (Sega, PlayStation 3, 2008), and Galaxy Blaster (RCMADIAX, Nintendo 3DS, 2017) receiving 14.

== Awards and accolades ==
=== Famitsu Awards ===
Famitsu administers the Famitsu awards. Video games receive a number of different awards in categories like Innovation, Biggest Hit, Rookie Award, Highest Quality, etc. One or two "Game of the Year" awards are granted as the top prize. Top prize winners are determined by a combination of critical and fan review scores as well as sales figures. They also give an "Excellence Prize" to other games that don't receive the top prize.

Prior to the formal establishment of the Famitsu Awards ceremony, Famitsu had been publishing annual lists of "Best Hit Game Awards" since early 1987 (for games released in 1986). The following titles were "Game of the Year" winners in the "Best Hit Game Awards" (between 1986 and 2004) and the Famitsu Awards (from 2005 onwards).

Famitsu Best Hit Game Awards (1986–1991, 2004)
Number	Year	Game of the Year	Platform	Genre	Ref
1st	1986	Dragon Quest	Famicom	Role-playing game	
2nd	1987	Dragon Quest II	Famicom	Role-playing game	
3rd	1988	Dragon Quest III	Famicom	Role-playing game	
4th	1989	Final Fantasy II	Famicom	Role-playing game	
5th	1990	Dragon Quest IV	Famicom	Role-playing game	
6th	1991	Final Fantasy IV	Super Famicom	Role-playing game	
—N/a	2004	Monster Hunter	PS2	Action role-playing game	

Famitsu Awards (2005–present)
Ceremony	Year	Game of the Year	Platform(s)	Genre	Ref
1st	2005	Kingdom Hearts II	PS2	Action RPG	
1st	2005	Resident Evil 4	GCN / PS2	Survival horror	
2nd	2006	Final Fantasy XII	PS2	RPG	
2nd	2006	Pokémon Diamond and Pearl	NDS	RPG	
3rd	2007	Monster Hunter Portable 2nd	PSP	Action RPG	
3rd	2007	Super Mario Galaxy	Wii	Platformer	
4th	2008	Monster Hunter Portable 2nd G	PSP	Action RPG	
5th	2009	Dragon Quest IX: Sentinels of the Starry Skies	NDS	RPG	
6th	2010	Monster Hunter Portable 3rd	PSP	Action RPG	
7th	2011	Monster Hunter 3G	3DS	Action RPG	
8th	2012	Animal Crossing: New Leaf	3DS	Life simulation	
9th	2013	Monster Hunter 4	3DS	Action RPG	
10th	2014	Yo-kai Watch 2	3DS	RPG	
11th	2015	Splatoon	Wii U	Third-person shooter	
12th	2016	Pokémon Sun and Moon	3DS	RPG	
13th	2017	The Legend of Zelda: Breath of the Wild	Wii U / Switch	Action-adventure	
13th	2017	Dragon Quest XI: Echoes of an Elusive Age	3DS / PS4	RPG	
14th	2018	Monster Hunter: World	PS4 / Xbox One / PC	Action RPG	
14th	2018	Super Smash Bros. Ultimate	Switch	Fighting	
15th	2019	Pokémon Sword and Shield	Switch	RPG	
16th	2020	Animal Crossing: New Horizons	Switch	Life simulation	
17th	2021	Monster Hunter Rise	Switch / PC	Action RPG	
18th	2022	Elden Ring	PS4 / PS5 / Xbox One / Xbox Series X/S / PC	Action RPG	
19th	2023	The Legend of Zelda: Tears of the Kingdom	Switch	Action-adventure	
20th	2024	Final Fantasy VII Rebirth	PS5	Action role-playing	
21st	2025	Silent Hill f	PS5 / Xbox Series X/S / PC	Survival Horror	

=== 2006 readers' poll ===
In March 2006, Famitsu readers voted for their 100 all-time favorite games.

- Super Mario Bros. (1985, FC)
- Spartan X (1985, FC)
- Gradius (video game) (1986, FC)
- The Legend of Zelda (1986, FCD)
- Dragon Quest (video game) (1986, FC)
- Pro Baseball: Family Stadium (1986, FC)
- Final Fantasy (1987, FC)
- Dragon Quest II (1987, FC)
- Wizardry: Proving Grounds of the Mad Overlord (1987, FC)
- The Hokkaido Serial Murder Case: The Okhotsk Disappearance (1987, FC)
- Pro Baseball Family Stadium '87 (1987, FC)
- Super Mario Bros. 3 (1988, FC)
- Final Fantasy II (1988, FC)
- Dragon Quest III (1988, FC)
- Best Play Pro Yakyū (1988, FC)
- Tetris (1989, GB)
- Mother (1989, FC)
- Ys I & II (1989, PCE)
- Super Mario World (1990, SFC)
- F-Zero (1990, SFC)
- Final Fantasy Legend II (1990, GB)
- Final Fantasy III (1990, FC)
- Final Fight (1990, SFC)
- Super Monaco GP (1990, MD)
- Digital Devil Story: Megami Tensei II (1990, FC)
- Dragon Quest IV: Chapters of the Chosen (1990, FC)
- The Legend of Zelda: A Link to the Past (1991, SFC)
- Sonic the Hedgehog (1991, MD)
- SimCity (1991, SFC)
- Final Fantasy IV (1991, SFC)
- Tengai Makyō II: Manjimaru (1992, PCE)
- Romancing SaGa (1992, SFC)
- Shin Megami Tensei (1992, SFC)
- Puyo Puyo (video game) (1992, MD)
- Super Mario Kart (1992, SFC)
- Dragon Quest V: Hand of the Heavenly Bride (1992, SFC)
- Final Fantasy V (1992, SFC)
- Street Fighter II (1992, SFC)
- Ogre Battle (1993, SFC)
- Torneko's Great Adventure: Mystery Dungeon (1993, SFC)
- Street Fighter II Turbo (1993, SFC)
- Seiken Densetsu II (1993, SFC)
- Final Fantasy VI (1994, SFC)
- Virtua Fighter (1994, SAT)
- Mother 2 (1994, SFC)
- Tokimeki Memorial (1994, PCE)
- Fire Emblem: Mystery of the Emblem (1994, SFC)
- Kamaitachi no Yoru (1994, SFC)
- Virtua Fighter 2 (1995, SAT)
- Chrono Trigger (1995, SFC)
- Dragon Quest VI: Realms of Revelation (1995, SFC)
- Tactics Ogre (1995, SFC)
- Tokimeki Memorial: Forever With You (1995, PS)
- Mystery Dungeon: Shiren the Wanderer (1995, SFC)
- Tokimeki Memorial: Forever With You (1996, SAT)
- Sakura Wars (1996, SAT)
- Resident Evil (1996, PS)
- Pokémon Red and Green (1996, GB)
- Final Fantasy Tactics (1997, PS)
- Tales of Destiny (1997, PS)
- Grandia (1997, SAT)
- Final Fantasy VII (1997, PS)
- Metal Gear Solid (1998, PS)
- Machi (1998, SAT)
- The Legend of Zelda: Ocarina of Time (1998, N64)
- Sakura Wars 2 (1998, SAT)
- Resident Evil 2 (1998, PS)
- Xenogears (1998, PS)
- Final Fantasy VIII (1999, PS)
- Valkyrie Profile (1999, PS)
- Shiren the Wanderer 2: Shiren's Castle and the Oni Invasion (2000, N64)
- Tales of Eternia (2000, PS)
- Dragon Quest VII (2000, PS)
- Super Robot Wars Alpha (2000, PS)
- Final Fantasy IX (2000, PS)
- Sakura Wars 3 (2001, DC)
- Metal Gear Solid 2: Sons of Liberty (2001, PS2)
- Dynasty Warriors 3 (2001, PS2)
- Final Fantasy X (2001, PS2)
- Kingdom Hearts (2002, PS2)
- Tales of Destiny 2 (2002, PS2)
- Sakura Wars 4 (2002, DC)
- The Legend of Zelda: The Wind Waker (2002, GCN)
- Final Fantasy X-2 (2003, PS2)
- Dynasty Warriors 4 (2003, PS2)
- Grand Theft Auto: Vice City (2004, PS2)
- Gran Turismo 4 (2004, PS2)
- To Heart 2 (2004, PS2)
- Dragon Quest V (2004, PS2)
- Metal Gear Solid 3: Snake Eater (2004, PS2)
- Dragon Quest VIII: Journey of the Cursed King (2004, PS2)
- Tales of Rebirth (2004, PS2)
- Monster Hunter (2004, PS2)
- Resident Evil 4 (2005, GCN)
- Kingdom Hearts II (2005, PS2)
- Resident Evil 4 (2005, PS2)
- Animal Crossing: Wild World (2005, NDS)
- Tales of the Abyss (2005, PS2)
- Monster Hunter Portable (2005, PSP)
- Monster Hunter G (2005, PS2)
