= Famista 64 =

1997 video game

- Developer: Namco
- Publisher: Namco
- Composers: Yoshinori Kawamoto; Asuka Sakai
- Series: Family Stadium
- Platform: Nintendo 64
- Release: JP: November 28, 1997
- Genre: Sports
- Modes: Single-player, multiplayer

Famista 64, (Note: Japanese: ファミスタ64, Hepburn: Famisuta Rokujūshi) also known as Family Stadium 64, is a 1997 baseball video game developed and published in Japan by Namco for the Nintendo 64. Controlling one of fourteen selectable teams, both real-world and fictional, the player must score more runs than the opposing team by pitching, batting and catching the ball, as in real baseball. It is the twelfth entry in the Family Stadium series, serving as a 3D remake of the original Pro Baseball: Family Stadium.

Originally intended as an installment in the World Stadium series, Famista 64 was Namco's first video game on a Nintendo platform since 1994, following several long arguments between the two companies since the late 1980s that ended with Namco preferring Sony and their console, the PlayStation, becoming one of the system's dominant third-party developers. It received largely mixed reviews for its simplistic gameplay and lack of replay value. Several also felt disappointed that Namco decided to make their first game for the platform a sports title as opposed to porting several of their PlayStation games, such as the Tekken series.

== Gameplay ==
In-game screenshot

Famista 64 is a baseball video game. Selecting one of fourteen different teams, consisting of twelve licensed from the Nippon Professional Baseball and two fictional ones, the player must score more runs than the opposing team by pitching, batting and catching the ball, as in real baseball. Players can also create their own teams with players taken from others.

Like other titles in the series, Famista 64 features players and stadiums based on older Namco video games. One of the game's fictional teams is named the Namco Stars and has players named after other Namco titles, such as Pac-Man, Xevious, Dig Dug, Toy Pop, Ridge Racer and NebulasRay. Several stadiums are also based on specific Namco titles, namely Xevious and Pac-Man.

== Development and release ==
Famista 64 was announced as Namco's first game for the Nintendo 64; the company had no comment for the press on whether it would develop any further games for the console. It was released exclusively in Japan for the Nintendo 64 by Namco on November 28, 1997. It serves as the twelfth entry in the company's long-running Family Stadium franchise, and is a high-definition remake of the first entry Pro Baseball: Family Stadium (1986), known outside Japan as R.B.I. Baseball. The game was one of the few titles by Namco for the system, alongside Namco Museum 64 and a port of Ms. Pac-Man Maze Madness, and the only one of these titles released in Japan. Famista 64 was also Namco's first video game on a Nintendo platform since 1994, following several arguments between the two companies in the 1980s that resulted in Namco favoring Sony and their console, the PlayStation, and becoming one of the system's dominant third-party publishers. The game was made per a contract agreed to by Nintendo and Namco, which allowed the latter to produce a sports title and later a role-playing game, the latter of which was never released.

The game was originally titled World Stadium 64 and instead based on Namco's long-running World Stadium baseball series, considered the arcade game equivalent to Family Stadium, and at first scheduled for release in early 1997. A North American localization was announced by Namco spokesperson Chris Bull, but was never released. It was shown to the public at September 1997 Tokyo Game Show, alongside Klonoa: Door to Phantomile and Namco Museum Encore, stated to have been at roughly 50% completion. The game's animations were designed using motion-capture. The television commercial used to promote it featured former Japanese baseball pitcher Masaru Ishikawa, who won the Pacific League Most Valuable Pitcher award in 1984 for the highest win-loss percentage — it featured him rising from the depths of the ocean and throwing a slim pitch, which was made to convey the fun and excitement of the game at a "tremendous scale". The music was composed by Yoshinori Kawamoto and Asuka Sakai, being one of the first games the latter worked on.

== Reception ==
Reception

Review scores
Publication	Score
Famitsu	30/40
GameSpot	2/5
Joypad	70%
N64 Magazine	68%
TV Gamer	7/10, 7/10, 6/10

Famista 64 was met with a mixed to negative reaction from critics, particularly from import reviewers — common complaints included its simplistic gameplay and lack of replay value. Some also felt disappointed with Namco choosing to instead make a sports game as opposed to bringing over many of their successful PlayStation titles, most notably the Tekken series. The game was a commercial success, selling 31,393 copies in two days and becoming the seventh best-selling game in Japan during November of that year. By March 1998, it became the fourth best-selling Nintendo 64 game in Japan, behind Yoshi's Story, Diddy Kong Racing and Jikkyou Powerful Pro Baseball 5.

GameSpot found the game difficult to recommend to import gamers for its high price point and straightforward gameplay, saying that players should instead be patient for Acclaim Entertainment's All-Star Baseball '99 and Nintendo's Major League Baseball Featuring Ken Griffey Jr.. GameSpot also felt disappointed towards Namco's decision to make their first game for the platform a sports title, hoping that they would instead put their efforts into porting games such as the Tekken series or Ridge Racer. N64 Magazine had a similar response, feeling that Namco should have made their Nintendo 64 debut with titles like Rage Racer or Tekken instead of a baseball game, a genre which they felt was plentiful on the console already. They also disliked the slow speed of the CPU players and the lack of replay value. IGN listed it as part of the "Middle of the Road Imports" section in their list of the best imports for the console, saying that the game itself was fun but not as good as Konami's Power Pros series.

Japanese publication Famitsu, who gave it the "Silver Hall of Fame" award, liked the game's simplistic character designs and gameplay, alongside its improvements and additions made to the original. GameSpot praised the graphics for being crisp, detailed and impressive animations, which they deemed "uncharacteristic of many N64 games", alongside its cute style and art reminiscent of R.B.I. Baseball on the NES. N64 Magazine liked the game's user-friendly nature for making it fair and appealing to new-comers, detailed graphics and "refreshingly" intelligent computer opponents, saying that it was likely one of the best baseball titles for the system. They also liked the game's presentation for being "slick" and motion-captured animations. Several outlets viewed the game as helping Namco return to producing titles for Nintendo hardware, after several years of arguments between them and Nintendo. IGN found it similar to the relationship between Nintendo and Squaresoft, and saw it as a potential way to help bring in additional third-party support for the Nintendo 64. N64 Magazine felt that Namco would be more willing to support the console if Famista 64 proved to be a success, hoping that it could lead to ports of the company's successful PlayStation franchises like Ridge Racer.
