= Super Batter Up =

1992 video game

- North American packaging artwork for the Super NES version
- Developer: Namco
- Publisher: Namco
- Designer: Masahiro Shimamoto
- Composers: Yoshinori Kawamoto; Shinya Yamada
- Series: Family Stadium
- Platform: Super NES
- Release: JP: March 27, 1992; NA: October 1992
- Genres: Sports (baseball)
- Modes: Single-player, multiplayer

Super Batter Up, known in Japan as Super Famista, (Note: Japanese: スーパーファミスタ) is a 1992 baseball video game developed and published by Namco for the Super Nintendo Entertainment System. The game can played with both a one- and two-player mode plus a league mode.

The North American release has an official license from the Major League Baseball Players Association and features the names of actual professional baseball players, but it does not have a license from Major League Baseball and no actual team names are used; the teams are only identified by their respective locales. While the all-star mode in the Japanese version of the game closely mimics the Nippon Professional Baseball All-Star Series, the North American version of the game emulates the MLB All-Star Game. An intrasquad mode (found only in the Japanese version) allows players on the same team to face off against each other. The only limitations are that there are only five pitchers on each team, players cannot be changed, and uniforms are limited to red and white colors.

== Gameplay ==
Someone has managed to hit the ball into the outfield. The outfielders are scrambling to retrieve the ball before the runner can score a run for his team.

The game features teams representing the 26 Major League Baseball teams and their players from the 1991 Major League Baseball season. Ballplayers who competed during that baseball season like Cal Ripken, Dave Winfield, and Kirby Puckett are included. The Japanese version, however, features teams and actual player names from the Nippon Professional Baseball league. Players get to play in either a dome resembling the Tokyo Dome in Japan or Rogers Centre (then called SkyDome) in Toronto, a contemporary baseball stadium (with homages to Japan's Koshien Stadium or Chicago's Wrigley Field), or in traditional-style stadium style (reminiscent of Chiba Marine Stadium in Japan or Busch Memorial Stadium (now Busch Stadium) in St. Louis). Each player in the Japanese version of the game has a popularity meter that gauges how liked they are by the audience; better players are more likely to be cheered on for an excellent play.

Players are shown standing up for the national anthem of both the United States and Canada (when the home team is Toronto or Montreal). They can also choose to substitute a hitter or a runner while at bat. All game stats are shown on the fictitious newspaper, known as the Namco Sports paper. Players are permitted to zoom in and out of the paper to look for minor details. The words "game over" appear on the screen regardless of whether the player wins or loses a game. Passwords can be entered to restore progress in the game. Both one-player and two-player modes integrates the traditional playing mode of the game. If the player wins the single-player tournament, then he can see the ending. The battle mode becomes a single-game mode when two players are playing. While the Japanese version of this game uses super deformed graphics for the ballplayers, the North American version uses 2D rendering software to create more realistic graphics.

The single-player league play mode keep tracks of all the players statistics during the season. Pitchers are considered to be "cold" when their ERA is above 9.90. An "average" hitter for season mode would theoretically have a batting average of .300 and 30 home runs while the "average" pitcher would have an ERA of 3.00 along with a fastball of 150 kilometres per hour (93 mph).

=== Stadium dimensions ===
- Dome: Artificial turf with 100 metres (330 ft) distances down each foul line and 122 metres (400 ft) in center field.
- Modern/contemporary stadium: Artificial turf with 91 metres (299 ft) distances down the coal up lines and 118 metres (387 ft) in center field.
- Traditional stadium: Natural grass with 97 metres (318 ft) distances in each corner and 120 metres (390 ft) to center field.

== Reception ==
Reception

Aggregate score
Aggregator	Score
GameRankings	56% (3 reviews)

Review scores
Publication	Score
AllGame	2.5/5
Electronic Gaming Monthly	5/10, 5/10, 5/10, 4/10
Famitsu	26/40

In Japan, it topped the Famitsu sales charts from April to May 1992.

Allgame editor Brett Alan Weiss described Super Batter Up as "an average baseball game", although he praised the game's "solid controls".

== See also ==
- Family Stadium
