= Italian Tomato =

Japanese restaurant company

Italian Tomato Co., Ltd.

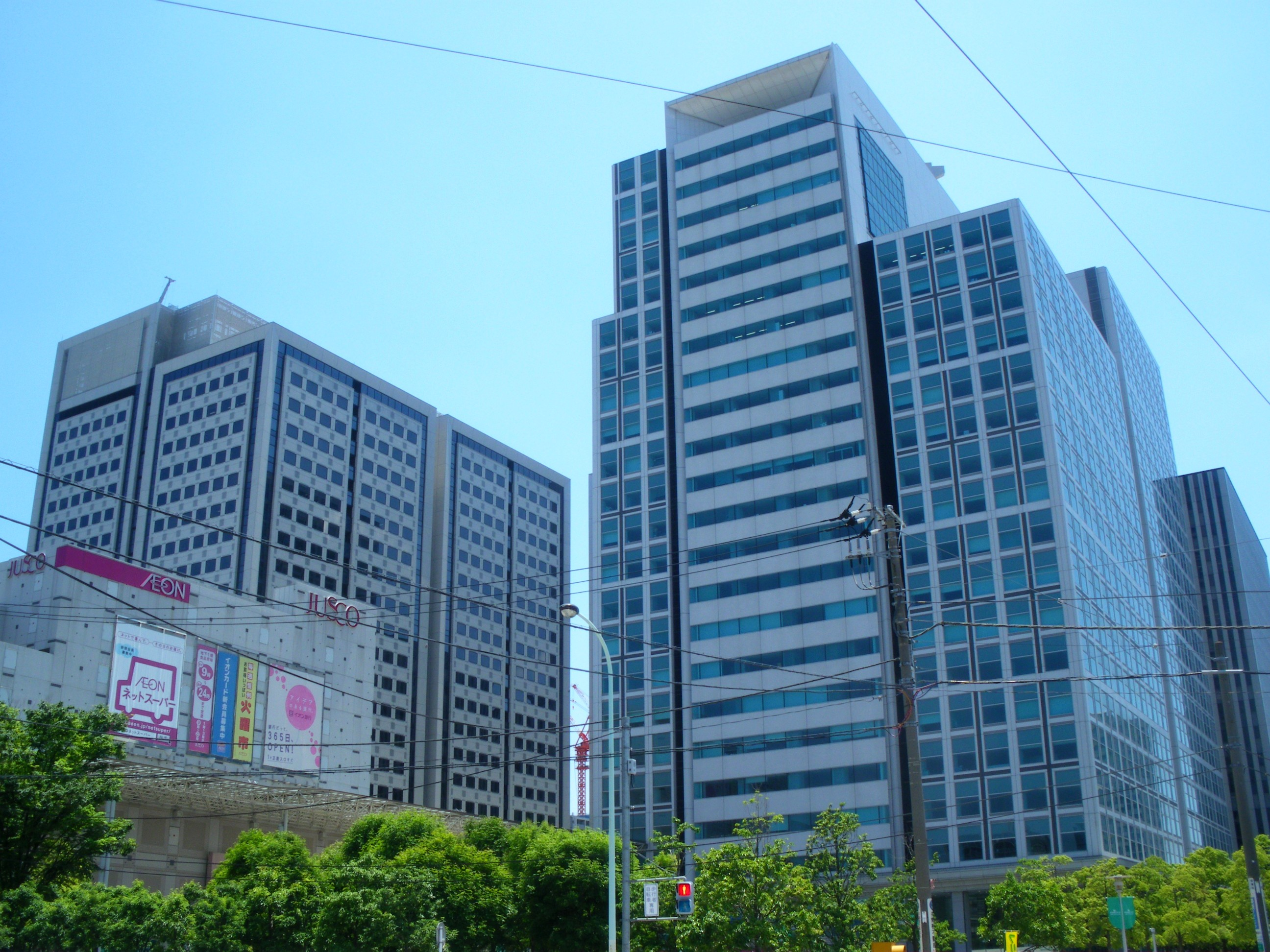
- Headquarters in Shinagawa, Tokyo
- Native name: 株式会社イタリアントマト
- Romanized name: Kabushiki-gaisha Itarian Tomato
- Founded: 1977; 49 years ago
- Headquarters: Shinagawa, Tokyo, Japan
- Area served: Japan; Hong Kong
- Key people: Nobuhiro Ozawa (president)
- Revenue: ¥100 million
- Owner: Namco (1986-2005); Key Coffee (2005-present)
- Number of employees: 133 (2020)
- Divisions: Italian Tomato Asean Sole
- Website: www.italiantomato.co.jp

Italian Tomato Co., Ltd (Note: Japanese: 株式会社イタリアントマト, Hepburn: Kabushiki-gaisha Itarian Tomato) is a Japanese restaurant and cafe chain headquartered in Shinagawa, Tokyo.

== History ==
Namco bought the Italian Tomato restaurant chain in 1986. Under Namco control, the store has been featured as a background in the Namco arcade and video console game hits Tekken 3 and Tekken Tag Tournament; the front of the store can be found in Ling Xiaoyu's stage, which is themed like an amusement park. Also, a cameo of this restaurant appeared in the Nintendo Family Computer RPG Rasāru Ishii no Childs Quest.

In 2005, Namco sold the majority share of Italian Tomato to Key Coffee, Inc. (キーコーヒー株式会社, Kīkōhī Kabushiki-gaisha), a food distributor and cafe operator. Since Namco, now Bandai Namco Games is a significant minority shareholder.
