= Namco Funscape =

Entertainment centre in County Hall, London, England

Coordinates: 51.502°N 0.119°W

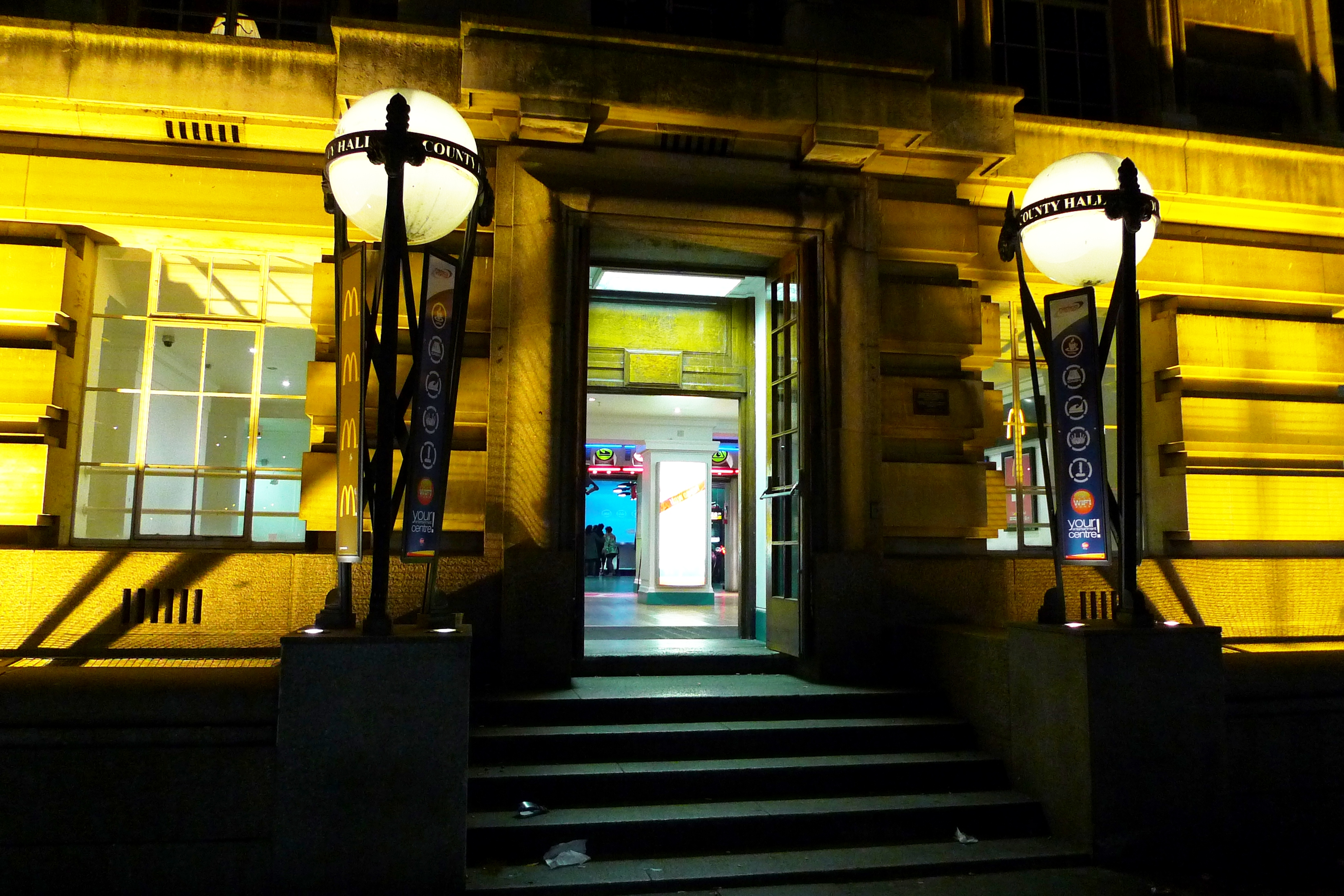
- Interactive map of the Namco Funscape area
- Former names: Namco Station

General information
- Type: Amusement arcade
- Location: Westminster Bridge Road, Riverside Buildings, London SE1 7PB, South Bank, Central London, United Kingdom
- Opened: August 1997
- Closed: August 2021

Namco Funscape, formally known as Namco Funscape County Hall, was a Namco amusement arcade located on the ground and basement levels of County Hall, South Bank, London. Originally opened as Namco Station in August 1997, it operated as one of the capital's leading family and corporate entertainment centres for 25 years. It closed permanently in August 2021 after redevelopment plans prevented the renewal of its lease.

The centre was owned and run by Namco UK Ltd (formerly Namco Operations Europe), a wholly owned subsidiary of Bandai Namco Amusement. It served as one of the company's longest-running flagship locations, outlasting examples opened in other countries. The centre had different types of arcade games and amusement attractions, including arcade video games, electro-mechanical games, redemption games, pool tables, ten-pin bowling, air hockey, Super Shot and Whac-A-Mole. Though generally targeted more towards families and tourists, it also hosted numerous official and unofficial esports tournaments for arcade video games as well as location tests.

Bandai Namco continues to operate other arcades under the Funscape brand in the United Kingdom, with similar venues located in the Trafford Centre in Manchester, the Metrocentre in Gateshead and elsewhere.

== History ==
=== Background, opening ===
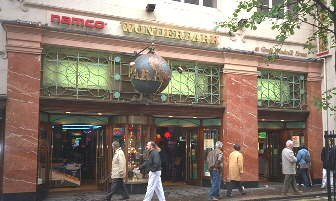
Namco Wonderpark, earlier sister location to Namco Station opened in July 1995

During the late 1980s and early 1990s, leading Japanese companies involved in the coin-op amusement industry such as Taito, Sega, and Namco opened a series of popular directly operated amusement centres domestically, supporting similarly successful development, manufacturing, and distribution arms. Namco's operations included its chain of Play City Carrot venues; these became larger and more family-focused over time. The company opened one of its largest sites, the Wonder Eggs theme park, in February 1992, containing early attractions developed in-house such as Galaxian 3 and Sim Road.

At the same point in time, Namco and Sega in particular sought to establish a stronger amusement presence in other parts of the world, building on earlier distribution work carried out. In the case of Europe and specifically the United Kingdom, this was executed by Namco with the formation of Namco Europe Ltd in 1991, and subsequent acquisition of Brent Leisure as an official UK distributor and manufacturer in 1992. While this allowed further ease of amusement equipment sales, the option of amusement operations in Europe based on examples opened in Japan was also opened.

Utilising know-how garnered from Japan in response to a trajectory set by Sega, Namco Europe opened its Namco Operations Europe Ltd subsidiary in 1993. Early venues launched in the UK included 1995's "Namco Wonderpark"s in Sheffield and Soho. Following further examples in other countries, Namco Operations launched its first "Namco Station" site at County Hall in August 1997. Designed by London-based architectural firm Proun and initially ran as a sister location to the aforementioned Wonderpark in Soho, mainstream coverage came from newspapers such as The Independent and The Guardian; the latter conducted interviews with Namco Europe directors John Bollom and Derrick Lynch, playtesting the Pinpoint Shot and Ridge Racer Full Scale attractions based on previous examples found at Wonder Eggs.

At the time of its opening in 1997, Namco Station was one of the two largest arcade entertainment centres in Europe, along with SegaWorld London.

=== 2000s ===
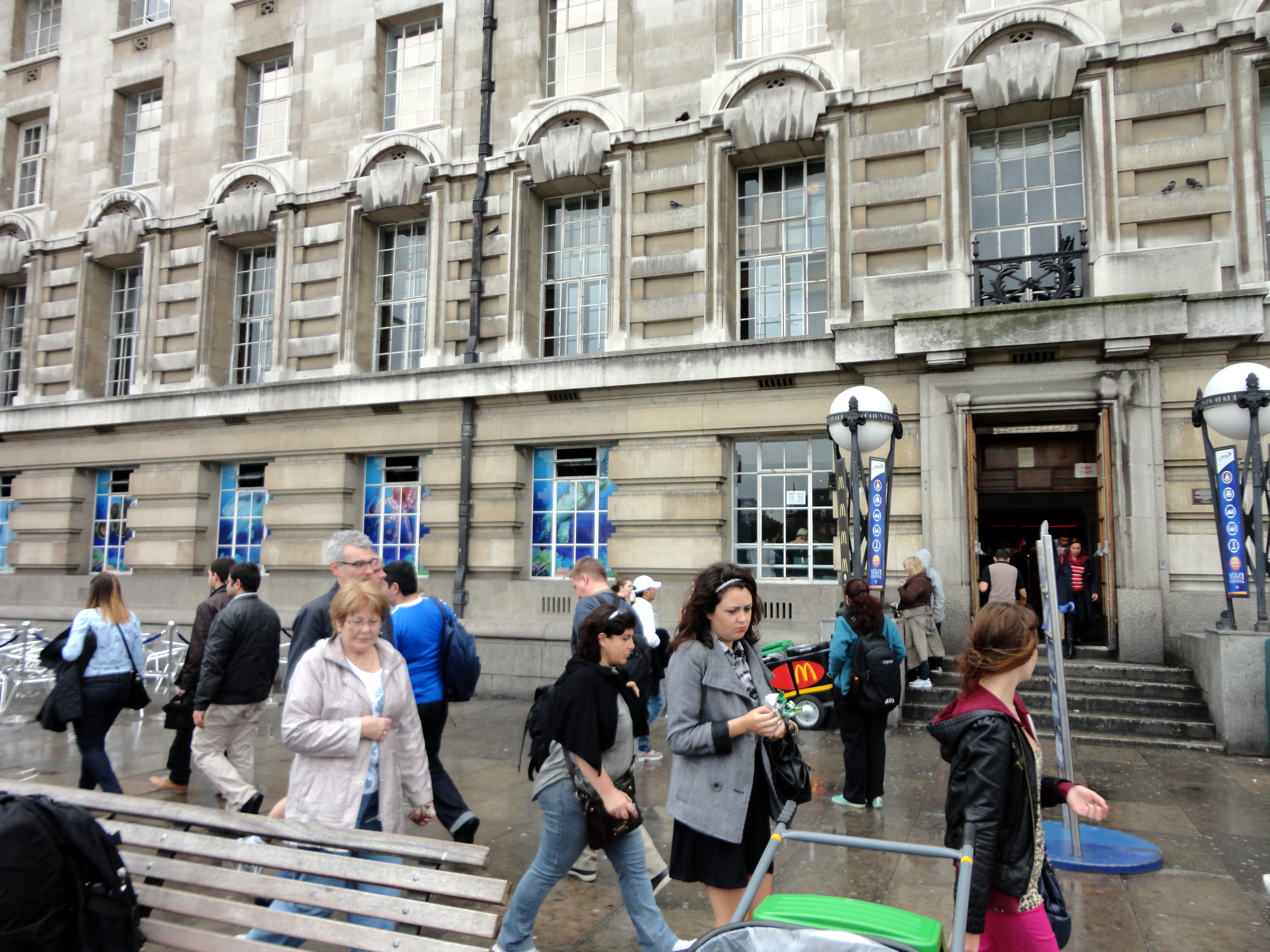
Exterior entrance to Namco Funscape at County Hall 2012 (right)

After the closure of its Wonderpark counterpart in Soho during 1999, Namco Station County Hall became the flagship Namco venue in Europe. Popular new additions to the centre during this period included early rhythm games such as localised Dancing Stage versions of Dance Dance Revolution, in addition to continued support for popular Namco series such as Tekken. Although competing arcades in London were more frequent sites for competitive play, Namco held occasional official events. These included 1999's Tekken 3 Iron Fist Tournament, in which Ryan Hart won his second world title.

Namco Station and its parent company, Namco Operations Europe, were largely unaffected by the 2005 formation of Bandai Namco Holdings, with it retaining its namesake alongside its other amusement facilities. In 2010, the centre appeared in a three minute sequence filmed for The IT Crowd's fourth series. After the July 2011 closure of rival London arcade Funland, Namco Station rebranded to become Namco Funscape; the decade saw emphasis on redemption games over video games and fewer tournament events after Tekken 6, as well as new attractions such as escape rooms, laser mazes and ping pong.

=== Closure ===
During February 2020, the second installation of Mario Kart Arcade GP VR in London appeared at Funscape after the Hollywood Bowl centre situated in The O2 Arena, however this and Namco Funscape would close temporarily the following month to follow COVID-19 lockdown legislations. The venue reopened and closed intermittently during this period in a cut-down capacity to follow social distancing guidelines. At the end of July 2021, arcade-focused news website Arcade Heroes and industry specialist Kevin Williams reported Namco Funscape County Hall was to close permanently in August. Redevelopment plans blocking Namco UK Ltd from renewing the lease were cited, with Namco stressing that it desired to renew and build on an estimated 50 million visitor count since 1997.

== Operations ==
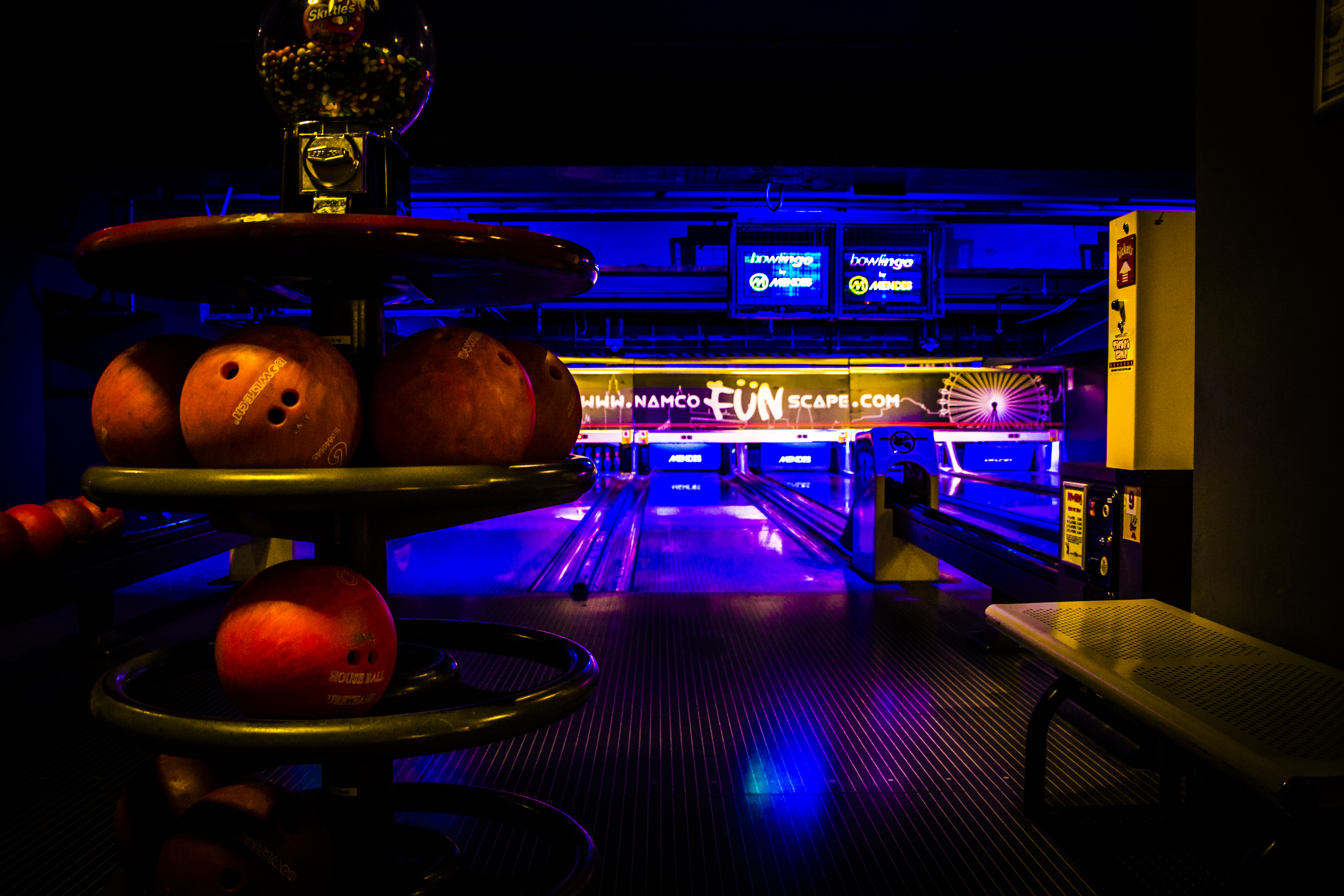
Bowling lanes in Namco Funscape (2014)

In its later years, Namco Funscape County Hall operated foremostly as a family entertainment centre, becoming one of several tourist attractions found in the County Hall complex. Its 35,000 square feet (3,300 m^{2}) of space consisted largely of an amusement arcade and bar. A small number of arcade machines were located in the centre's entrance at ground level, with the majority being accessed through two adjacent escalators to the basement floor. Alongside bowling lanes, these were located on the left side of the facility's space. A prominent feature of the arcade area was its central bumper car track.

The "N Bar", a licensed bar and restaurant facility featuring further arcade machines, karaoke rooms, and pool tables, was found below and to the right of the arcade at sub-basement level. Serving food during the day and alcohol until closing, the floor could be accessed through a number of branching stairways; a large balcony area also provided a viewpoint for the bar's large video screens, broadcasting sporting events and music. As well as additional bowling lanes, the facilities enabled Funscape to offer corporate entertainment packages for parties, as well as over 18s areas for fruit machines.

Like many Namco amusement facilities, its mascot, Pac-Man, was heavily featured in branding.

== See also ==
- Namco Namja Town
- SegaWorld London
- London Trocadero
