= Family Stadium =

Video game series

- Developers: Namco; Bandai Namco Entertainment
- Publishers: Namco; Bandai Namco Entertainment
- Creator: Yoshihiro Kishimoto
- Composers: Junko Ozawa; Hiromi Shibano
- Platforms: Family Computer, Super Famicom, MSX, Game Boy, Game Boy Advance, Nintendo 64, GameCube, Nintendo DS, Nintendo 3DS, Wii, PC, Mobile phone, Nintendo Switch
- First release: Pro Baseball: Family Stadium; December 10, 1986
- Latest release: Pro Yakyuu Famista 2020; September 17, 2020
- Spin-offs: World Stadium; R.B.I. Baseball; Great Sluggers

Family Stadium, (Note: Japanese: ファミスタ) also known as Pro Yakyū: Family Stadium and Famista, is a series of baseball sports video games initially developed and released by Namco in Japan, and later developed and published by Bandai Namco Entertainment. The first entry in the series, Pro Baseball: Family Stadium, was released for the Nintendo Family Computer in 1986 and later in North America as R.B.I. Baseball (subsequent games in this series would see various names used when exported to North America but none after 1992), with the series being released on numerous home consoles, the latest being Pro Yakyuu Famista 2020 in 2020 for the Nintendo Switch. The series is considered a precursor to Namco's own World Stadium series of baseball games, released for arcades, PlayStation, and GameCube. The series has been a commercial success since, with over 15 million copies being sold as of 2016.

In April 1993, Famicom Tsūshin (Famitsu) magazine awarded Family Stadium a world record for being the video game franchise with the most published video game releases, with fourteen video games published for the series up until then.

== List of games ==
Title	Details
Pro Baseball: Family Stadium Original release date(s): JP: December 10, 1986	Release years by system: 1986 – Family Computer, Nintendo VS. System
Pro Baseball: Family Stadium Original release date(s): JP: December 10, 1986	Notes: Localized and released as Atari R.B.I. Baseball and R.B.I. Baseball in the U.S.
Pro Baseball: Family Stadium '87 Original release date(s): JP: December 22, 1987	Release years by system: 1987 – Family Computer
Pro Baseball: Family Stadium '87 Original release date(s): JP: December 22, 1987	Notes: This game marks the first appearance of real players from Nippon Professional Baseball.; It topped the bi-weekly Japanese Famitsu sales charts in December 1987, and again during late January to early February 1988.
Pro Baseball: Family Stadium '88 Nendoban Original release date(s): JP: December 20, 1988	Release years by system: 1988 – Family Computer
Pro Baseball Family Stadium: Home Run Contest Original release date(s): JP: April 28, 1989	Release years by system: 1989 – MSX
Famista '89: Kaimaku Ban!! Original release date(s): JP: July 28, 1989	Release years by system: 1989 – Family Computer
Famista '89: Kaimaku Ban!! Original release date(s): JP: July 28, 1989	Notes: It topped the bi-weekly Japanese Famitsu sales chart in August 1989.
Pro Baseball Family Stadium: Pennant Race Original release date(s): JP: November 22, 1989	Release years by system: 1989 – MSX
Pro Baseball Family Stadium: Pennant Race Original release date(s): JP: November 22, 1989	Notes: Developed by Compile.
Famista '90 Original release date(s): JP: December 19, 1989	Release years by system: 1989 – Family Computer
Famista Original release dates: JP: September 14, 1990; NA: April 1991	Release years by system: 1990 – Game Boy
Famista Original release dates: JP: September 14, 1990; NA: April 1991	Notes: Published in North America by Bandai as Extra Bases.
Pro Baseball: Family Stadium '90 Original release date(s): JP: September 28, 1990	Release years by system: 1990 – FM Towns
Pro Baseball: Family Stadium '90 Original release date(s): JP: September 28, 1990	Notes: Developed by Game Arts.
Famista '91 Original release date(s): JP: December 21, 1990	Release years by system: 1991 – Family Computer
Gear Stadium Original release dates: JP: April 5, 1991; NA: 1991	Release years by system: 1991 – Game Gear
Gear Stadium Original release dates: JP: April 5, 1991; NA: 1991	Notes: Released in North America as Batter Up.
Famista '92 Original release date(s): JP: December 20, 1991	Release years by system: 1991 – Family Computer
Super Famista Original release dates: JP: March 27, 1992; NA: October 1992	Release years by system: 1992 – Super Famicom
Super Famista Original release dates: JP: March 27, 1992; NA: October 1992	Notes: Released in North America as Super Batter Up.
Famista 2 Original release date(s): JP: July 30, 1992	Release years by system: 1992 – Game Boy
Famista '93 Original release date(s): JP: December 22, 1992	Release years by system: 1992 – Family Computer
Super Famista 2 Original release date(s): JP: March 12, 1993	Release years by system: 1993 – Super Famicom
Super Famista 2 Original release date(s): JP: March 12, 1993	Notes: It topped the Japanese Famitsu sales chart in March 1993.
Famista 3 Original release date(s): JP: October 29, 1993	Release years by system: 1993 – Game Boy
Famista '94 Original release date(s): JP: December 1, 1993	Release years by system: 1993 – Family Computer
Super Famista 3 Original release date(s): JP: March 4, 1994	Release years by system: 1994 – Super Famicom
Super Famista 4 Original release date(s): JP: March 3, 1995	Release years by system: 1995 – Super Famicom
Super Famista 4 Original release date(s): JP: March 3, 1995	Notes: Features in-game advertising From Kirin Beverages.; The last Family Stadium game published under Namco brand.
Gear Stadium Heiseiban Original release date(s): JP: October 20, 1995	Release years by system: 1995 – Game Gear
Super Famista 5 Original release date(s): JP: February 29, 1996	Release years by system: 1996 – Super Famicom
Super Famista 5 Original release date(s): JP: February 29, 1996	Notes: Support XBAND modem.; Features in-game advertising from Kirin Beverages.
Famista 4 Original release date(s): JP: November 29, 1996	Release years by system: 1996 – Game Boy
Famista 4 Original release date(s): JP: November 29, 1996	Notes: Only available in Namco Gallery Vol.2.
Famista 64 Original release date(s): JP: March 4, 1997	Release years by system: 1997 – Nintendo 64
Famista Advance Original release date(s): JP: June 28, 2002	Release years by system: 2002 – Game Boy Advance
Family Stadium 2003 Original release date(s): JP: May 30, 2003	Release years by system: 2003 – GameCube
Pro Baseball: Famista DS Original release date(s): JP: November 15, 2007	Release years by system: 2007 – Nintendo DS
Pro Baseball: Family Stadium Original release date(s): JP: May 1, 2008	Release years by system: 2008 – Wii
Pro Baseball: Famista DS 2009 Original release date(s): JP: April 2, 2009	Release years by system: 2009 – Nintendo DS
Famista Wireless Original release date(s): JP: October 1, 2009; (Softbank S!アプリ), JP: February 2, 2010; (NTTDoCoMo FOMA)	Release years by system: 2009 – Mobile (Softbank, FOMA)
Pro Baseball: Famista DS 2010 Original release date(s): JP: March 25, 2010	Release years by system: 2010 – Nintendo DS
Pro Baseball: Famista Online 2010 Original release date(s): JP: April 30, 2010	Release years by system: 2010 – Microsoft Windows
Pro Baseball: Famista Online 2010 Original release date(s): JP: April 30, 2010	Notes: Developed by E-Frontier.
Pro Baseball: Famista 2011 Original release date(s): JP: March 31, 2011	Release years by system: 2011 – Nintendo 3DS
Famista Dream Match Original release date(s): JP: October 1, 2014	Release years by system: 2014 – iOS, Android
Pro Baseball: Famista Returns Original release date(s): JP: October 8, 2015	Release years by system: 2015 – Nintendo 3DS
Pro Baseball: Famista Climax Original release date(s): JP: April 20, 2017	Release years by system: 2017 – Nintendo 3DS
Pro Baseball: Famista Evolution Original release date(s): JP: August 3, 2018	Release years by system: 2018 – Nintendo Switch
Pro Yakyuu Famista 2020 Original release date(s): JP: September 17, 2020	Release years by system: 2020 - Nintendo Switch

== See also ==
- Power Pros, another Japanese baseball video game series with a cartoonish art-style
- World Stadium
