= Pro Baseball: Family Stadium =

1986 baseball video game

- Japanese cover art
- Developer: Namco
- Publishers: JP: Namco; NA: Atari Games (arcade); NA: Tengen (NES)
- Designer: Yoshihiro Kishimoto
- Composer: Norio Nakagata
- Series: Family Stadium; R.B.I. Baseball
- Platforms: Famicom, Arcade, NES
- Release: Famicom: JP: December 10, 1986; Arcade: JP: December 10, 1986; NA: 1987; NES: NA: June 1988
- Genres: Sports (baseball)
- Modes: Single-player, multiplayer
- Arcade system: Nintendo VS. System

Pro Baseball: Family Stadium, released as Pro Yakyū: Family Stadium (Note: Japanese: プロ野球ファミリースタジアム, Hepburn: Puro Yakyū Famirī Sutajiamu) in Japan and R.B.I. Baseball in North America, is a 1986 baseball video game developed and published by Namco for the Family Computer console and Nintendo VS. System arcade unit. In North America, it was published by Tengen as R.B.I. Baseball for the Nintendo Entertainment System. It was also released in arcades through the Nintendo VS. System. It is the first game in the Family Stadium and R.B.I. Baseball franchises. The game was a critical and commercial success in Japan and North America.

== Development ==
Family Stadium was created by Namco programmer Yoshihiro Kishimoto, who had previously worked on games such as Baraduke (1985). The planner for Toy Pop, Takefumi Hyodoh, had transferred from a different section of the company — as his first time being a planner, Hyodoh was rather slow, which left Kishimoto with plenty of free time. For a short while he spent most of his time playing Nintendo's Baseball for the Famicom with some of his colleagues, where during play they would bring up how certain parts of the game could be fixed or improved, notably the lack of names or abilities for the in-game players. Kishimoto also expressed disappointment towards the game's lack of playable defense. Once development of Toy Pop was completed, Kishimoto decided to try making a baseball game of his own.

The project was made for the Family Computer due to the system's massive success in Japan and for Namco's console and arcade operations being part of the same division, allowing Kishimoto to easily begin development of the game in his section of the company. After asking his supervisor about what work he was assigned to next, he was instead told he could make whatever type of game he wanted, due to a lack of work needed by him for the time being. Family Stadium was Kishomoto's first experience with developing a game for the Famicom and with assembly code. It was also Namco's first baseball video game, as prior to the game's release they had released several baseball-themed mechanical arcade games, such as Pitch In (1979) and Batting Chance (1981).

== Release ==
Family Stadium was released in Japan on December 10, 1986, for both the Famicom console and Nintendo VS. System arcade unit. Atari Games released the game for arcades in North America in September 1987, renamed VS. Atari R.B.I. Baseball for the arcade Nintendo VS. System. It was later released for the Nintendo Entertainment System by Tengen as simply R.B.I. Baseball, being one of the company's only three officially licensed games released for the console. Atari programmer Peter Lipson was responsible for the localization of the game.

R.B.I Baseball became the first console game of its kind to be licensed by the Major League Baseball Players Association (MLBPA) and used actual MLB player names, unlike other baseball video games of the late 1980s. As it was not licensed by Major League Baseball (MLB) itself, it did not use team nicknames or logos. Instead, the game contained 8 teams listed by only their location: Boston, California, Detroit, Houston, Minnesota, New York, St. Louis, and San Francisco; their real-life, MLB counterparts were the first place teams in each division in 1986 (Boston, California, Houston, New York) and 1987 (Detroit, Minnesota, St. Louis, San Francisco) MLB seasons. The game also boasted two All-Star teams, American League and National League; the two featured established veterans such as George Brett, Mike Schmidt, Dale Murphy and Andre Dawson—none of whom appeared on the other eight teams—and up-and-coming players like Mark McGwire, Andrés Galarraga, Kevin Seitzer and José Canseco.

== Reception ==
Reception

Review scores
Publication	Score
Famitsu	35/40
Family Computer Magazine	25.37/30

Awards
Publication	Award
Famitsu	Platinum Hall of Fame
Famitsu Best Hit Game Awards	Best Sports Game; Long Seller

Upon release, Pro Baseball: Family Stadium was met with critical acclaim by critics. It received a Famitsu score of 35 out of 40, making it one of the oldest games in the Famitsu Platinum Hall of Fame (at least 35 out of 40). Reviewers applauded its gameplay and sense of realism, as well as its usage of giving each of the players actual names and abilities. In the first Famitsu Best Hit Game Awards published in February 1987, the game received the award for Best Sports Game.

It was also a commercial success. In Japan, it topped the Famitsu sales charts in January 1987, and went on to sell over 2.05 million copies, making it one of the best-selling Famicom games of all time. In the second Famitsu Best Hit Game Awards published in February 1988, the game received the "Long Seller" award. In the United States, R.B.I. Baseball topped the sales charts in August 1988.
