= Namco =

Japanese video game developer and publisher

Namco Limited
- Logo (reused by Bandai Namco Amusements for its arcade chain of the same name)

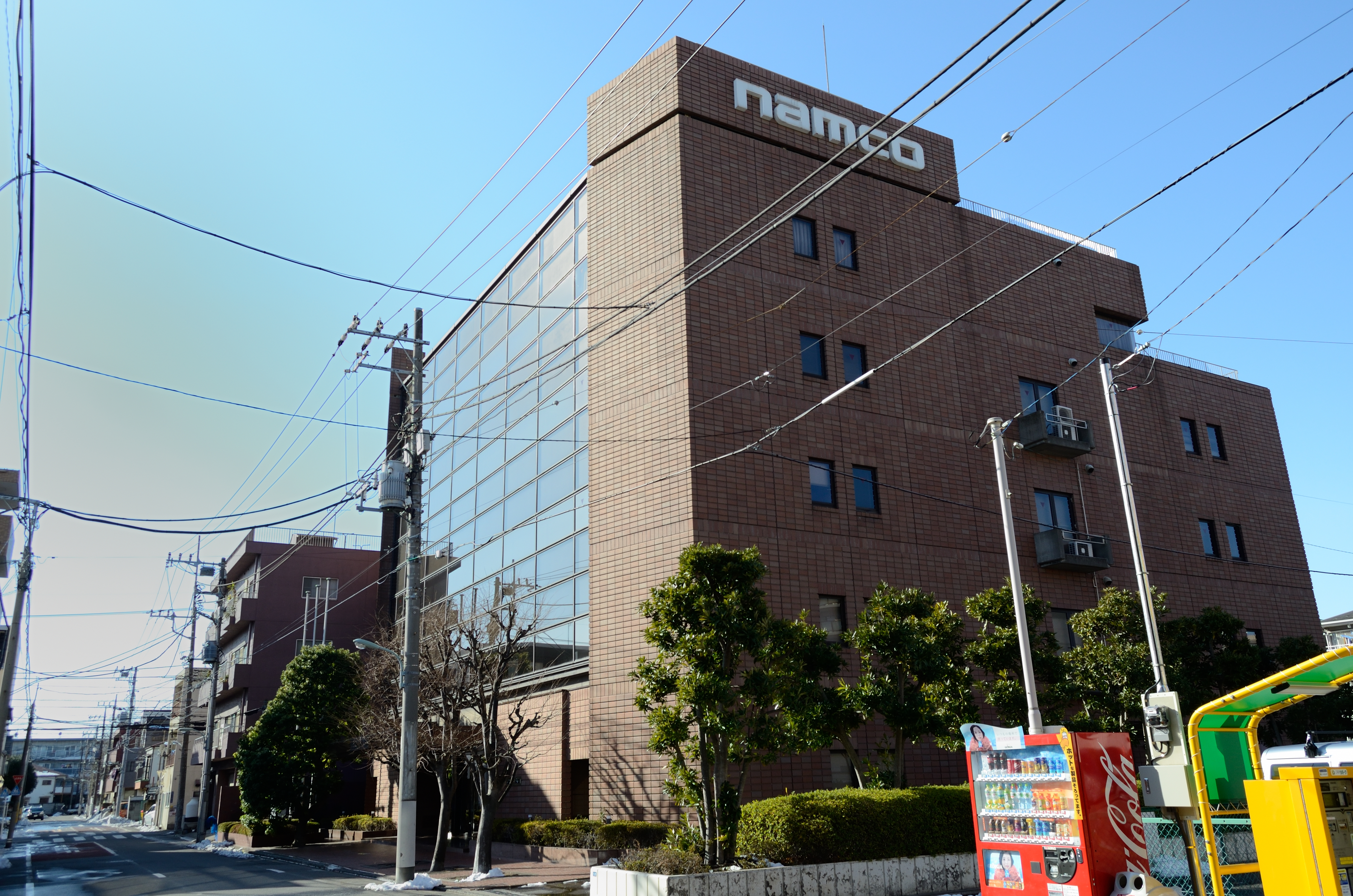
- Headquarters in Ōta, Tokyo
- Native name: 株式会社ナムコ
- Romanized name: Kabushiki-gaisha Namuko
- Formerly: Nakamura Seisakusho Co., Ltd. (1955–1977)
- Type: Subsidiary
- Industry: Video games
- Founded: June 1, 1955; 71 years ago
- Founder: Masaya Nakamura
- Defunct: March 31, 2006; 20 years ago
- Fate: Merged with Bandai's video game operations to form Bandai Namco Games.
- Successor: Namco Bandai Games; Namco (second incarnation)
- Headquarters: Yaguchi, Ōta, Tokyo, Japan
- Area served: Worldwide
- Key people: Masaya Nakamura; (executive chairman); Shigeichi Ishimura; (president)
- Products: Video games
- Parent: Namco Bandai Holdings (2005–2006)
- Subsidiaries: Namco Tales Studio; Monolith Soft; Namco-America; Namco Europe; Namco Shanghai; Namco Enterprises Asia; Namco Taiwan; Italian Tomato
- Website: www.namco.co.jp

Namco Limited (Note: Japanese: 株式会社ナムコ, Hepburn: Kabushiki-gaisha Namuko) (formerly known as Nakamura Seisakusho, Nakamura Manufacturing Company and Nakamura Amusement Machine Company) was a Japanese multinational video game and entertainment company founded in 1955. It operated video arcades and amusement parks globally, and produced video games, films, toys, and arcade cabinets. Namco was one of the most influential companies in the coin-op and arcade game industry, producing multi-million-selling game franchises such as Pac-Man, Galaxian, Tekken, Soulcalibur, Tales, Ridge Racer, and Ace Combat.

The name Namco comes from Nakamura Manufacturing Company, derived from Namco's founder, Masaya Nakamura. In the 1960s, Nakamura Manufacturing built electro-mechanical arcade games such as the 1965 hit Periscope. It entered the video game industry after acquiring the struggling Japanese division of Atari in 1974, distributing games such as Breakout in Japan. The company renamed itself Namco in 1977 and published Gee Bee, its first original video game, a year later. Among Namco's first major hits was the fixed shooter Galaxian in 1979, followed by Pac-Man in 1980. Namco prospered during the golden age of arcade video games in the early 1980s, releasing popular games such as Galaga, Xevious, and Pole Position.

Namco entered the home market in 1984 with conversions of its arcade games for the MSX and the Nintendo Family Computer, later expanding to competing platforms, such as the Sega Genesis, TurboGrafx-16, and PlayStation. It continued to produce hit games in the 1990s, including Ridge Racer, Tekken, and Taiko no Tatsujin, but endured financial difficulties due to the struggling Japanese economy and diminishing arcade market.

In 2005, Namco merged with Bandai to form Namco Bandai Holdings. The standalone Namco brand continues to be used for video arcade centers and other entertainment products by the group's Bandai Namco Amusements division. Namco's video games division was merged into the subsidiary Bandai Namco Entertainment. Namco is remembered for its unique corporate model, its importance to the industry, and its advancements in technology.

== History ==
=== Origins and acquisition of Atari Japan (1955–1977) ===
The logo of Nakamura Seisakusho, the predecessor to Namco

On June 1, 1955, Japanese businessman Masaya Nakamura founded Nakamura Seisakusho Co., Ltd., (Note: Japanese: 株式会社中村製作所, Hepburn: Kabushiki gaisha Nakamura Seisakujo) in Ikegami, Tokyo. The son of a shotgun repair business owner, Nakamura proved unable to find work in his chosen profession of ship building in the struggling post-World War II economy. Nakamura established his own company after his father's business saw success with producing pop cork guns. Beginning with only ¥300,000 (US$12,000), Nakamura spent the money on two hand-cranked rocking horses that he installed on the roof garden of a Matsuya department store in Yokohama.

The horses were loved by children and turned a decent profit for Nakamura, who began expanding his business to cover other smaller locations. A 1959 business reorganization renamed the company Nakamura Seisakusho Company, Ltd. The Mitsukoshi department store chain noticed his success in 1963, and approached him with the idea of constructing a rooftop amusement space for its store in Nihonbashi, Tokyo. It consisted of horse rides, a picture viewing machine, and a goldfish scooping pond, with the centerpiece being a moving train named Roadaway Race. The space was a hit and led to Mitsukoshi requesting rooftop amusement parks for all of its stores.

Along with Taito, Rosen Enterprises, and Nihon Goraku Bussan, Nakamura Seisakusho became one of Japan's leading amusement companies. As the business grew in size, it used its clout to purchase amusement machines in bulk from other manufacturers at a discount, and then sell them to smaller outlets at full price. While its machines sold well, Nakamura Seisakusho lacked the manufacturing lines and distribution networks of its competitors, which made the production of them longer and more expensive.

The company was unable to place its machines inside stores because other manufacturers already had exclusive rights to these locations. In response, Nakamura Seisakusho opened a production plant in February 1966, moving its corporate office to a four-story building in Ōta, Tokyo. The company secured a deal with Walt Disney Productions to produce children's rides in the likenesses of its characters, in addition to those using popular anime characters like Q-Taro; this move allowed the business to further expand its operations and become a driving force in the Japanese coin-op market.

Though the manufacturing facility was largely reserved for its Disney and anime rides, Nakamura also used it to construct larger, more elaborate electro-mechanical games. The first of these was Torpedo Launcher (1965), a submarine warfare shooting gallery later titled Periscope. Its other products included Ultraman-themed gun games and pinball-like games branded with Osomatsu-kun characters.

The name Namco was introduced in 1971 as a brand for several of its machines. The company grew to having ten employees, which included Nakamura himself. It saw continued success with its arcade games, which had become commonplace in bowling alleys and grocery stores. The company also established a robotics division to produce robots for entertainment centers and festivals, such as those that distributed pamphlets, ribbon making machines, and a robot named Putan that solved pre-built mazes.

In August 1973, American game company Atari began establishing a series of divisions in Asia, one of which was named Atari Japan. Its president, Kenichi Takumi, approached Nakamura in early 1974 to have his business become the distributor of Atari games across Japan. Nakamura, already planning global expansion following his company's success, agreed to the deal. In part due to employee theft, Atari Japan was a financial disaster and nearly collapsed in its first few years of operation.

When Takumi stopped showing up to work, the company was handed to Hideyuki Nakajima, a former employee of the Japan Art Paper Company. Atari co-founder Nolan Bushnell, whose company was already struggling in America, chose to sell the Japanese division. His fixer, Ron Gordon, was given the task of finding the buyer for Atari Japan. After being turned down by Sega and Taito, Gordon's offer was accepted by Nakamura for ¥296 million ($1.18M), though Nakamura informed Bushnell his company was unable to pay the money by the deadline. With no other takers for Atari Japan, Bushnell ultimately allowed Nakamura to only pay $550,000 and then $250,000 a year for three years. The acquisition allowed Nakamura Seisakusho to distribute Atari games across Japan, and would make it one of the country's largest arcade game companies.

The Atari Japan purchase was not an immediate success, in part due to the medal game fad of the 1970s. While Nakamura Seisakusho saw some success with imports such as Kee Games's Tank, the Japanese video game industry's decrease in popularity did not make them as profitable as hoped. The market became more viable once restrictions on medal games were imposed by the Japanese government in 1976, as Nakamura Seisakusho began returning higher profits; its import of Atari's Breakout was so successful that it led to rampant piracy in the industry. By the end of the year, Nakamura Seisakusho was one of Japan's leading video game companies.

=== Galaxian, Pac-Man, and arcade success (1977–1984) ===
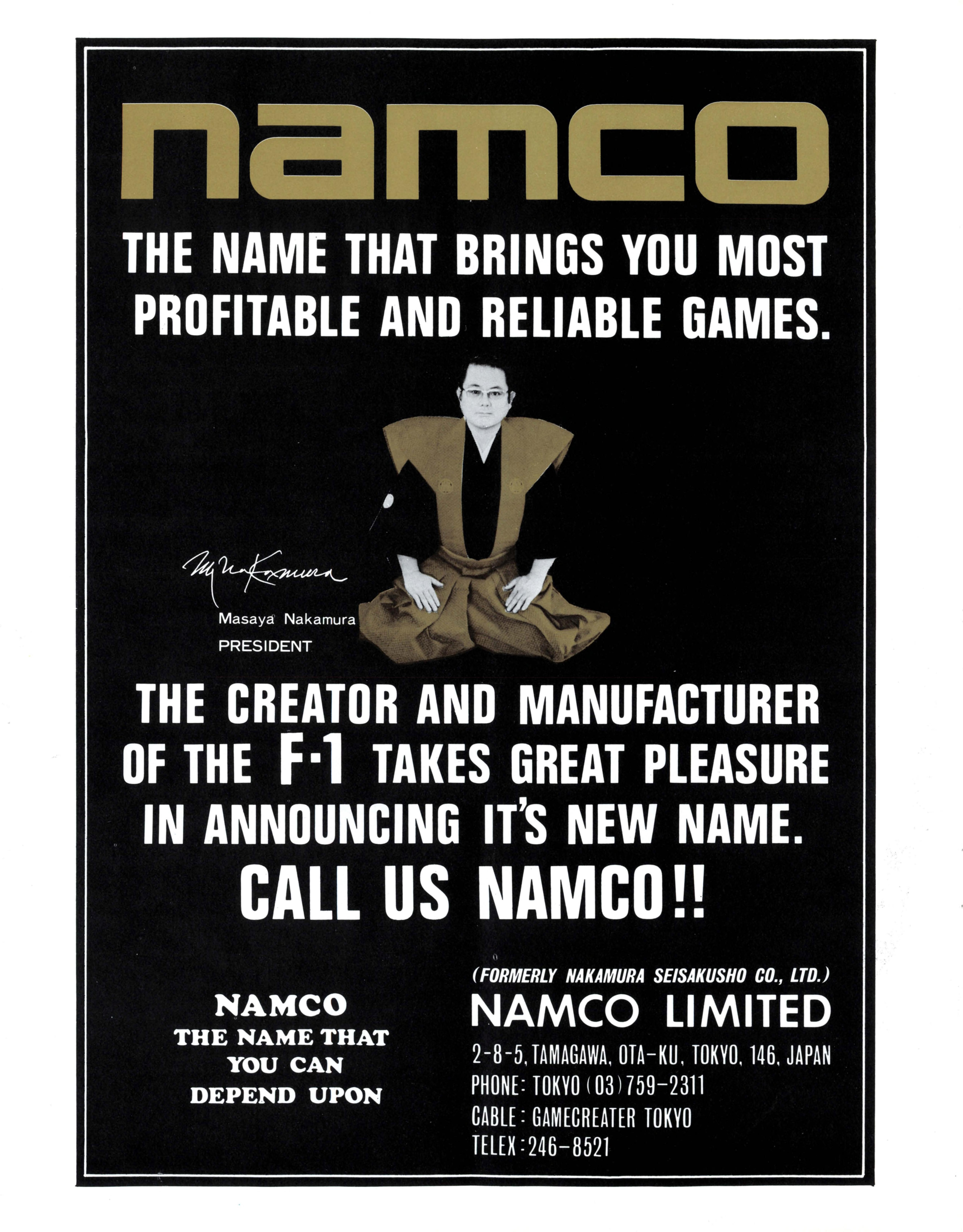
Trade advertisement from Play Meter featuring Masaya Nakamura announcing the change of corporate name

Nakamura Seisakusho changed its corporate name to Namco in June 1977. It opened a division in Hong Kong named Namco Enterprises Asia, which maintained video arcades and amusement centers. As Namco's presence in Japan was steadily rising, Nakajima suggested to Nakamura that he open a division in the United States to increase worldwide brand awareness. Nakamura agreed to the proposal, and on September 1, 1978, established Namco-America in Sunnyvale, California. With Nakajima as its president and Satashi Bhutani as vice president, Namco-America's aim was to import games and license them to companies such as Atari and Bally Manufacturing. Namco-America would release a few non-video arcade games itself, such as Shoot Away (1977).

As the video game industry prospered in Japan during the 1970s with the release of Taito's Space Invaders, Namco turned its attention towards making its own video games. While its licensed Atari games were still profitable, sales were decreasing and the quality of the hardware used began deteriorating. Per the recommendation of company engineer Shigekazu Ishimura, the company retrofitted its Ōta manufacturing facility into a small game division and purchased old stock computers from NEC for employees to study.

Namco released Gee Bee, its first original game, in October 1978. Designed by new hire Toru Iwatani, it is a video pinball game that incorporates elements from Breakout and similar "block breaker" clones. Though Gee Bee fell short of the company's sales expectations and was unable to compete with games such as Space Invaders, it allowed Namco to gain a stronger foothold in the video game market.

In 1979, Namco published its first major hit Galaxian, one of the first video games to incorporate RGB color graphics, score bonuses, and a tilemap hardware model. Galaxian is considered historically important for these innovations, and for its mechanics building off those in Space Invaders. It was released in North America by Midway Manufacturing, the video game division of Bally, where it became one of its best-selling games and formed a relationship between Midway and Namco.

Pac-Man has been Namco's mascot since the character's introduction in 1980.

The space shooter genre became ubiquitous by the end of the decade, with games such as Galaxian and Space Invaders becoming commonplace in Japanese amusement centers. As video games often depicted the killing of enemies and shooting of targets, the industry possessed a predominately male playerbase. Toru Iwatani began work on a maze video game that was targeted primarily towards women, with simplistic gameplay and recognizable characters. Alongside a small team, he created a game named Puck Man, where players controlled a character that had to eat dots in an enclosed maze while avoiding four ghosts that pursued them.

Iwatani based the gameplay off eating and designed its characters with soft colors and simplistic facial features. Puck Man was test-marketed in Japan on May 22, 1980 and given a wide-scale release in July. It was only a modest success; players were more accustomed to the shooting gameplay of Galaxian as opposed to Puck Man's visually distinctive characters and gameplay style. In North America, it was released as Pac-Man in November 1980. Pac-Man's simplicity and abstract characters made it a fixture in popular culture, spawning a multi-million-selling media franchise.

Namco regularly released several successful games throughout the early 1980s. It published Galaga, the follow-up to Galaxian, in 1981 to critical acclaim, usurping its predecessor in popularity with its fast-paced action and power-ups. 1982 saw the release of Pole Position, a racing game that is the first to use a real racetrack (the Fuji Speedway) and helped laydown the foundations for the racing genre. It released Dig Dug the same year, a maze chaser that allowed players to create their own mazes.

Namco's biggest post-Pac-Man success was the vertical-scrolling shooter Xevious in 1983, designed by new-hire Masanobu Endō. Xevious's early usage of pre-rendered visuals, boss fights, and a cohesive world made it an astounding success in Japan, recording record-breaking sales figures that had not been seen since Space Invaders. The game's success led to merchandise, tournament play, and the first video game soundtrack album. The same year, Namco released Mappy, an early side-scrolling platformer, and the Pole Position sequel Pole Position II.

Endō went on to design The Tower of Druaga a year later, a maze game that helped establish the concept for the action role-playing game. Druaga's design influenced games such as Nintendo's The Legend of Zelda. 1984 also saw the release of Pac-Land, a Pac-Man-themed platform game that paved the way for similar games such as Super Mario Bros., and Gaplus, a moderately successful update to Galaga. The success of Namco's arcade games prompted it to launch its own print publication, Namco Community Magazine NG, to allow its fans to connect with developers.

=== Success with home consoles (1984–1989) ===
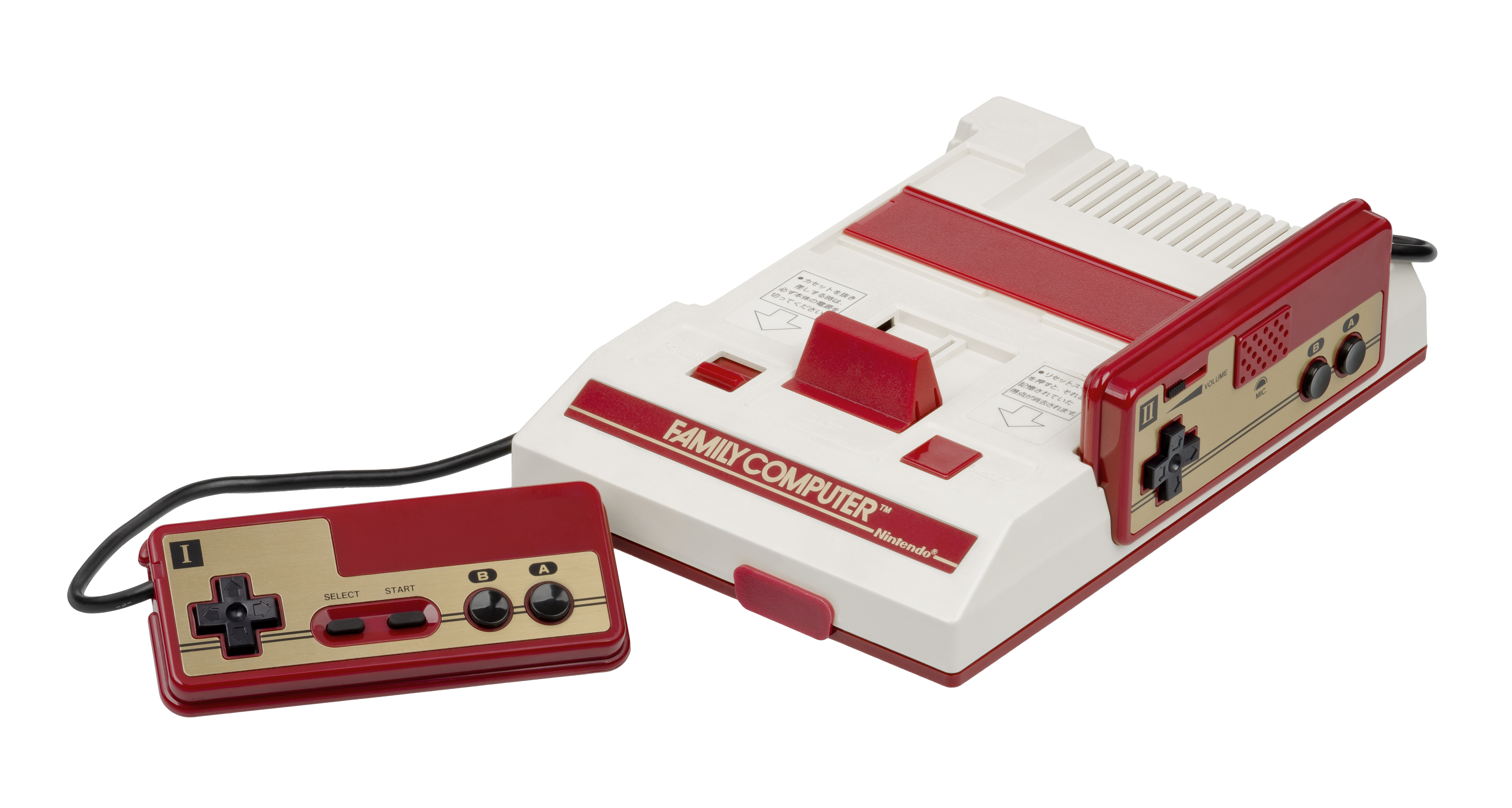
Namco became one of the first third-party developers for the Famicom, with its arcade game ports increasing system sales.

In July 1983, Nintendo released the Family Computer, a video game console that utilized interchangeable cartridges to play games. The console's launch came with ports of some of Nintendo's popular arcade games, like Donkey Kong, which at the time were considered high quality. Though Namco recognized the system's potential to allow consumers to play accurate versions of its games, the company chose to hold off on the idea after its ports for platforms such as the Sord M5 flopped. Nakamura suggested that his son-in-law, Shigeichi Ishimura, work with a team to reverse-engineer and study the Famicom's hardware in the meantime.

His team created a conversion of Galaxian with their newfound knowledge of the console's capabilities, which exceeded the quality of previous home releases. The port was presented to Nintendo president Hiroshi Yamauchi alongside notification that Namco intended to release it with or without Nintendo's approval. Namco's demonstration was the impetus for Nintendo's decision to create a licensing program for the console. Namco signed a five-year royalties contract that included several preferential terms, such as the ability to produce its own cartridges.

A subsidiary named Namcot (Note: 株式会社ナムコット, Kabushiki-gaisha Namukotto) was established in 1984 to act as Namco's console game division. According to former Namco video game music composer Norio Nakagata, "T" means "Tomorrow" and was capitalised for emphasis. Tomorrow was derived from EPCOT (Experimental Prototype Community of Tomorrow). It released its first four games in September: Galaxian, Pac-Man, Xevious, and Mappy. Xevious sold over 1.5 million copies and became the Famicom's first "killer app". Namcot also began releasing games for the MSX, a popular Japanese computer. Namco's arcade game ports were considered high-quality and helped increase sales of the console.

Namcot was financially successful and became an important pillar within the company; when Namco moved its headquarters to Ōta, Tokyo in 1985, it used the profits generated from the Famicom conversion of Xevious to fund its construction (the building was nicknamed "Xevious" as a result). The Talking Aid, a speech impairment device, was part of the company's attempts in venturing into other markets.

By the time the video game crash of 1983 concluded in 1985 with the release of the Nintendo Entertainment System (NES), Atari had effectively collapsed. After enduring numerous financial difficulties and losing its control in the industry, parent Warner Communications sold the company's personal computer and home console divisions to Commodore International founder Jack Tramiel, who renamed his company Tramel Technology to Atari Corporation. Warner was left with Atari's arcade game and computer software divisions, which it renamed Atari Games. Namco America purchased a 60% stake in Atari Games on February 4, 1985, through its AT Games subsidiary, with Warner holding the remaining 40%. The acquisition gave Namco the exclusive rights to distribute Atari games in Japan.

Nakamura began losing interest and patience in Atari Games not long after the acquisition. As he started viewing Atari as a competitor to Namco, he was hesitant to pour additional funds and resources into the company. Nakamura also disliked having to share ownership with Warner Communications. Nakajima grew frustrated with Nakamura's attempts at marketing Atari video games in Japan, and had constant disagreements with him over which direction to take the company. Viewing the majority-acquisition as a failure, in 1987 Namco America sold 33% of its ownership stake to a group of Atari Games employees led by Nakajima.

This prompted Nakajima to resign from Namco America and become president of Atari Games. He established Tengen, a publisher that challenged Nintendo's licensing restrictions for the NES by selling several unlicensed games, which included ports of Namco arcade games. Though its selloff made Atari Games an independent entity, Namco still held a minority stake in the company and Nakamura retained his position as its board chairman until the middle of 1988.

In Japan, Namco continued to see expeditious growth. It published Pro Baseball: Family Stadium for the Famicom, which was critically acclaimed and sold over 2.5 million copies. Its sequel, Pro Baseball: Family Stadium '87, sold an additional two million. In 1986, Namco entered the restaurant industry by acquiring the Italian Tomato café chain. It also released Sweet Land, a popular candy-themed prize machine.

One of Namco's biggest hits from the era was the racing game Final Lap from 1987. It is credited as the first arcade game to allow multiple machines to be connected—or "linked"—together to allow for additional players. Final Lap was one of the most-profitable coin-operated games of the era in Japan, remaining towards the top of sales charts for the rest of the decade.

Namco's continued success in arcades provided its arcade division with the revenue and resources needed to fund its research and development (R&D) departments. Among their first creations was the helicopter shooter Metal Hawk in 1988, fitted in a motion simulator arcade cabinet. Its high development costs prevented it from being mass-produced. While most of its efforts were commercially unsuccessful, Namco grew interested in motion-based arcade games and began designing those at a larger scale. In 1988, Namco became involved in film production when it distributed the film Mirai Ninja in theaters, with a tie-in video game coinciding with its release.

Namco also developed the beat 'em up Splatterhouse, which attracted attention for its fixture on gore and dismemberment, and Gator Panic, a derivative of Whack-a-Mole that became a mainstay in Japanese arcades and entertainment centers. In early 1989, Namco unveiled its System 21 arcade system, one of the earliest arcade boards to utilize true 3D polygonal graphics. Nicknamed "Polygonizer", the company demonstrated its power through the Formula One racer Winning Run.

With an arcade cabinet that shook and swayed the player as they drove, the game was seen as "a breakthrough product in term of programming technique" and garnered significant attention from the press. Winning Run was commercially successful, convincing Namco to continue researching 3D video game hardware. Video arcades under the Namco banner continued opening up in Japan and overseas, such as the family-friendly Play City Carrot chain.

=== Expansion into other markets (1989–1994) ===
Namco saw continued success in the consumer game market as a result of the "Famicom boom" in the late 1980s. By 1989, sales of games for the Famicom and NES accounted for 40% of its annual revenue. During the same time frame, the company's licensing contract with Nintendo expired; when Namco attempted to renew its license, Nintendo chose to revoke many of the preferential terms it originally possessed. Hiroshi Yamauchi insisted that all companies, including Namco, had to follow the same guidelines.

The revocation of Namco's terms enraged Nakamura, who announced the company would abandon Nintendo hardware and focus on production of games for competing systems such as the PC Engine. Executives resisted the idea, fearing it would severely impact the company financially. Against Nakamura's protest, Namco signed Nintendo's new licensee contract anyway. While it continued to produce games for Nintendo hardware, most of Namco's quality releases came from the PC Engine and Mega Drive.

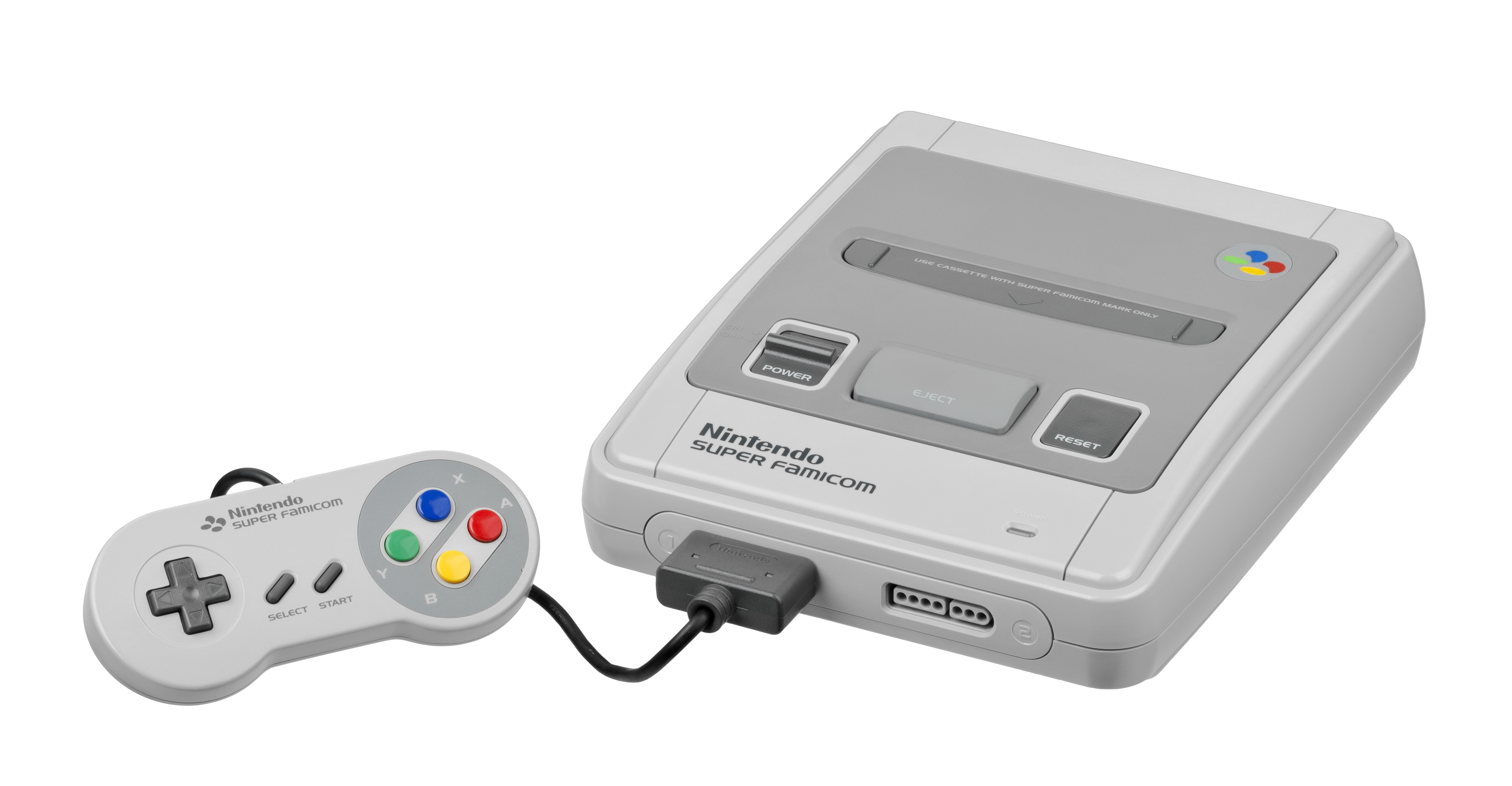
Namco's unreleased 16-bit console had hardware comparable to the Nintendo Super Famicom.

In 1989, it was reported that Namco was underway with developing its own video game console to compete against companies such as Nintendo and NEC. Electronic Gaming Monthly claimed that the system, which was nearing completion, featured hardware comparable to the then-upcoming Nintendo Super Famicom. According to company engineer Yutaka Isokawa, it was produced to compete against the Mega Drive, a 16-bit console by Namco's arcade rival Sega. With the console industry being crowded by other competing systems, publications were unsure how well it would perform in the market. While the console was never released, it allowed Namco to familiarize itself with designing home video game hardware.

Tadashi Manabe replaced Nakamura as president of Namco on May 2, 1990. Manabe, who had been the company's representative director since 1981, was tasked with strengthening relationships and teamwork ethics of management. Two months later, the company dissolved its remaining connections with Atari Games when Time Warner reacquired Namco America's remaining 40% stake in Atari Games. In return, Namco America was given Atari's video arcade management division, Atari Operations, allowing the company to operate video arcades across the United States. Namco began distributing games in North America directly from its US office, rather than through Atari.

Namco Hometek was established as the home console game division of Namco America; the latter's relations with Atari Games and Tengen made the company ineligible to become a Nintendo third-party licensee, instead relying on publishers such as Bandai to release its games in North America. In Japan, Namco developed two theme park attractions, which were demonstrated at the 1990 International Garden and Greenery Exposition (Expo '90): Galaxian3: Project Dragoon, a 3D rail shooter that supported 28 players, and a dark ride based on The Tower of Druaga.

As part of the company's idea of "hyperentertainment" video games, Namco engineers had drafted ideas for a possible theme park based on Namco's experience with designing and operating indoor play areas and entertainment complexes. Both attractions were commercially successful and among the most popular of Expo 90's exhibitions. In arcades, Namco released Starblade, a 3D rail shooter noteworthy for its cinematic presentation. This led to Namco dominating the Japanese dedicated arcade cabinet charts by October 1991, holding the top six positions that month with Starblade at the top.

In February 1992, Namco opened its own theme park, Wonder Eggs, in the Futakotamagawa Time Spark area in Setagaya, Tokyo. Described as an "urban amusement center", Wonder Eggs was the first amusement park operated by a video game company. In addition to Galaxian3 and The Tower of Druaga, the park featured carnival games, carousels, motion simulators, and Fighter Camp, the first flight simulator available to the public. The park saw regularly high attendance numbers; 500,000 visitors attended in its first few months of operation and over one million by the end of the year.

Namco created the park out of its interest in designing a Disneyland-inspired theme park that featured the same kind of stories and characters present in its games. Wonder Eggs contributed to Namco's 34% increase in revenue by December 1992. Namco also designed smaller, indoor theme parks for its larger entertainment complexes across the country, such as Plabo Sennichimae Tempo in Osaka.

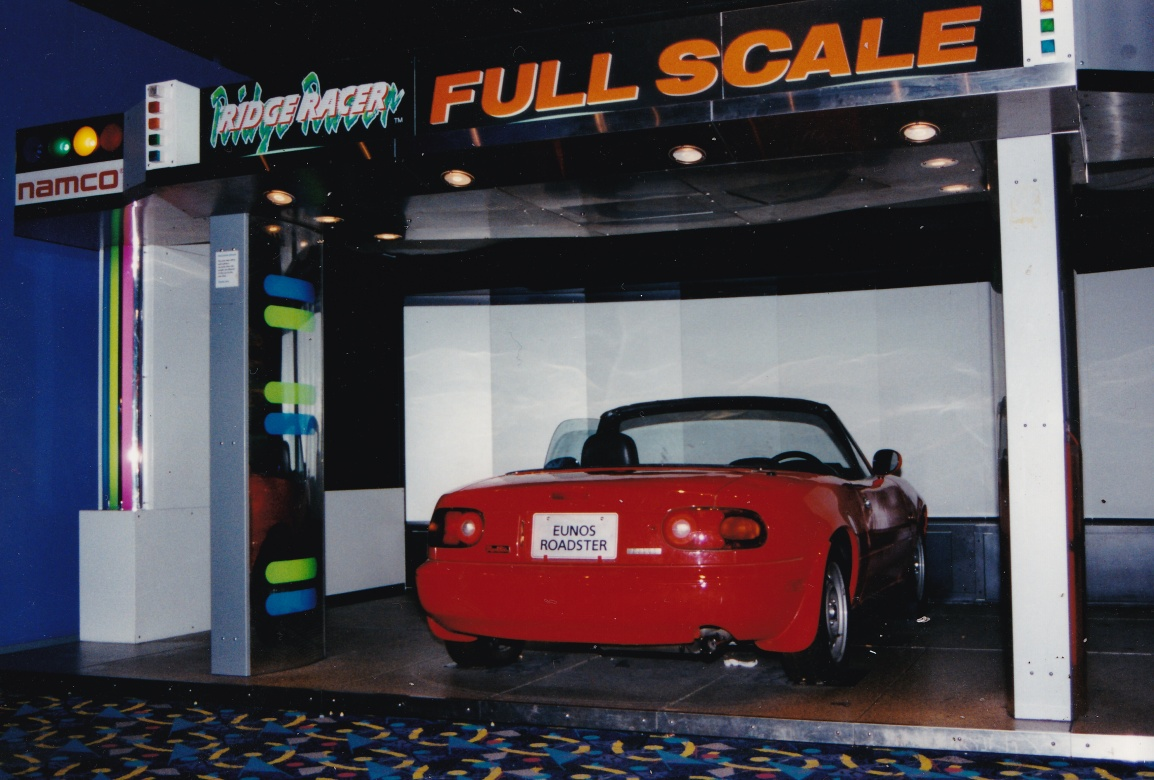
A Ridge Racer Full Scale arcade machine

Manabe resigned as president on May 1, 1992, due to a serious anxiety disorder, and Nakamura once again assumed the role. Manabe instead served as the company's vice chairman until his death in 1994. The company's arcade division, in the meantime, began work on a new 3D arcade board named System 22, capable of displaying polygonal 3D models with fully-textured graphics. Namco enlisted the help of Evans & Sutherland, a designer of combat flight simulators for The Pentagon, to assist in the board's development.

The System 22 powered Ridge Racer, a racing game, in 1993. Ridge Racer usage of 3D textured polygons and drifting made it a popular game in arcades and one of Namco's most-successful releases, and is labeled a milestone in 3D computer graphics. The company followed its success with Tekken, a 3D fighting game, a year later. Designed by Seiichi Ishii, the co-creator of Sega's landmark fighting game Virtua Fighter, Tekken's wide array of playable characters and consistent framerate helped it outperform Sega's game in popularity, and launched a multi-million-selling franchise as a result.

The company continued expanding its operations overseas, such as the acquisition of Bally's Aladdin's Castle, Inc., the owners of the Aladdin's Castle chain of mall arcades. In December, Namco acquired Nikkatsu, Japan's oldest-surviving film studio that at the time was undergoing bankruptcy procedures. The purchase allowed Nikkatsu to utilize Namco's computer graphics hardware for its films, while Namco was able to gain a foothold in the Japanese film industry.

=== Relationship with Sony (1994–1998) ===
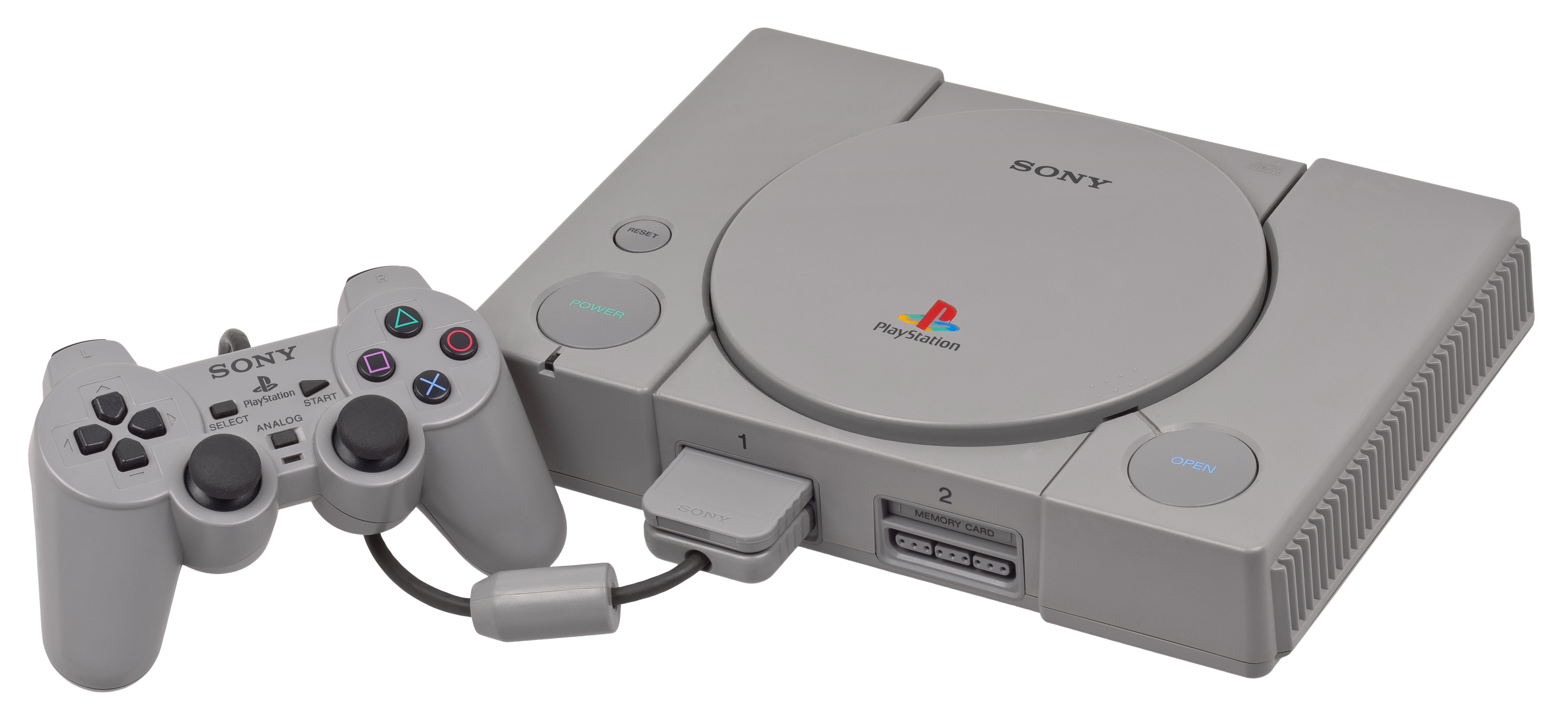
Namco was one of the first third-party supporters for the PlayStation, and helped the system achieve success in its early years.

In October 1993, Sony announced establishing of its video game & entertainment division Sony Computer Entertainment (now Sony Interactive Entertainment) in November of that year

In early 1994, Sony announced that it was developing its own video game console, the 32-bit PlayStation. The console began as a collaboration between Nintendo and Sony to create a CD-based peripheral for the Super Nintendo Entertainment System in 1988. Fearing that Sony would assume control of the entire project, Nintendo silently scrapped the add-on. Sony chose to refocus its efforts in designing the PlayStation in-house as its own console.

As it lacked the resources to produce its own games, Sony called for the support of third-party companies to develop PlayStation software. Namco, frustrated with Nintendo and Sega's licensing conditions for its consoles, agreed to support the PlayStation and became its first third-party developer. The company began work on a conversion of Ridge Racer, its most-popular arcade game at the time.

The PlayStation was released in Japan on December 3, 1994, with Ridge Racer as one of its launch titles. 100,000 units of the game were sold on launch day alone; publications credited Ridge Racer as key to the PlayStation's early success, giving it an edge over its competitor, the Sega Saturn. For a time, it was the best-selling PlayStation game in Japan.

Namco formerly used the "Namcot" brand for its home video games. The Namcot brand was consolidated into Namco in 1995; its final game was a PlayStation port of Tekken, published in March in Japan and in November worldwide. Tekken was designed for Namco's System 11 arcade system board, which was based on raw PlayStation hardware; this allowed the home version to be a near-perfect rendition of its arcade counterpart. Tekken became the first PlayStation game to sell one million copies and played a vital role in the console's mainstream success.

Sony recognized Namco's commitment to the console, leading to Namco receiving special treatment from Sony and early promotional material adopting the tagline "PlayStation: Powered by Namco". Namco was also given the rights to produce controllers, such as the NeGcon, which it designed with the knowledge it gained through developing its cancelled console. Though it had signed contracts to produce games for systems such as the Saturn and 3DO, Namco concentrated its consumer software efforts on PlayStation for the remainder of the decade.

As a means to draw players into its video arcades, Namco's arcade game division began releasing games that featured unique and novel control styles and gameplay. In 1995, the company released Alpine Racer, an alpine skiing game that was awarded "Best New Equipment" during the year's Amusement and Music Operators Association (AMOA) exposition. Time Crisis, a lightgun shooter noteworthy for its pedal ducking mechanic, helped set the standard for the genre as a whole, while Prop Cycle gained notoriety for its usage of a bicycle controller the player pedaled.

The photo booth machine Star Audition, which offered players the chance of becoming a star in the show business, became a media sensation in Japan. Namco Operations, which was renamed Namco Cybertainment in 1996, acquired the Edison Brothers Stores arcade chain in April. Namco also introduced the Postpaid System, a centralized card payment system, as a means to combat the piracy of IC Cards in Japanese arcades.

In September 1997, Namco announced it would begin development of games for the Nintendo 64, a console struggling to receive support from third-party developers. Namco signed a contract with Nintendo that allowed the company to produce two games for the console: Famista 64, a version of its Family Stadium series, and an untitled RPG for the 64DD peripheral. The RPG was never released while the 64DD went on to become a commercial failure. In October 1998, which one publication described as being "the most stunning alliance this industry has seen in a long while", Namco announced a partnership deal with long-time rival Sega to bring some of its games to the newly unveiled Dreamcast.

As Namco primarily developed games for Sony hardware, and were among the biggest third-party developers for the PlayStation, the announcement surprised news outlets. For its PlayStation-based System 12 arcade board, Namco released the weapon-based fighting game Soul Edge a couple years back in 1996. Its 1999 Dreamcast sequel, which features multiple graphical enhancements and new game modes, is an early instance of a console game being better than its arcade version. Soulcalibur sold over one million units, won multiple awards, and contributed to the early success of the Dreamcast.

=== Financial decline and restructuring (1998–2005) ===
Namco began experiencing decline in its consumer software sales by 1998 as a result of the Japanese recession, which affected the demand for video games as consumers had less time to play them. Namco's arcade game Tekken 3, launched in March 1997, had been well-received, and the console version of its arcade game Tekken 2 also became a hit selling over three million units. The company's arcade division had similar struggles, having slumped by 21% at the end of its fiscal year ending March 1998. Namco's US subsidiary Namco Cybertainment filed for Chapter 11 bankruptcy protection on January 29, 1998, citing reduced mall traffic, though it planned to close fewer than 50 of its 370 mall locations during the bankruptcy reorganization and even open new locations. In its 1998 annual report, Namco reported a 26.3% drop in net sales, which it partly blamed on low consumer spending.

A further 55% drop was reported in November 1999 when its home console game output decreased. As a means to diversify itself from its arcade and consumer game markets, Namco entered the mobile phone game market with the Namco Station, a marketplace for i-Mode cellular devices that featured ports of its arcade games like Pac-Man and Galaxian.

In October 1999, the company teamed up with former Square alum Tetsuya Takahashi to establish a development studio called Monolith Soft, which later become an action role-playing game developer best known for creating & developing the Xenosaga series with Namco provided funding for the new franchise and majority-acquired the new development studio turning it as a subsidiary within Namco. It continued introducing novel concepts for arcades to help attract players, such as the Cyber Lead II, an arcade cabinet that features PlayStation and Dreamcast VMU memory card slots.

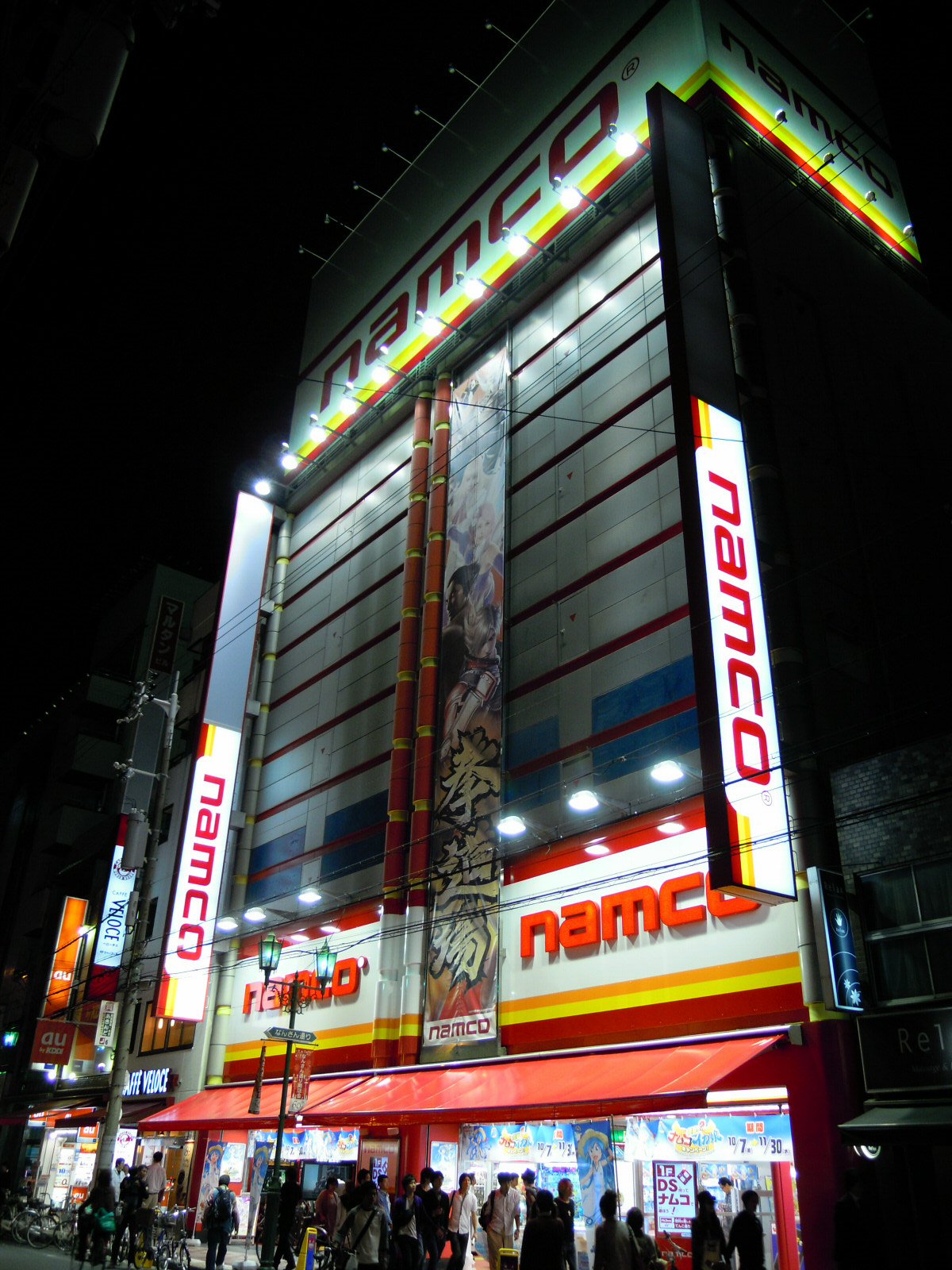
A Namco-branded video arcade in Osaka

Namco's financial losses worsened in the 2000s. In October 2000, the Japanese newspaper Nihon Keizai Shimbun reported that the company projected a loss of ¥2.1 billion ($19.3M) for the fiscal year ending March 2001. Namco had previously hinted at this during an event with industry analysts, blaming its struggles on the depressed Japanese economy and dwindling arcade game market. The company closed its Wonder Eggs park on December 31, 2000, which by that point saw an attendance number of six million visitors, in addition to shuttering many of its video arcades that returned substandard profits.

In February 2001, Namco updated its projections and reported it now expected a ¥6.5 billion ($56.3M) net loss and a drop in revenue by 95% for the fiscal year ending March 2001, which severely impacted the company's release schedule and corporate structure. The company's earnings forecasts were lowered to accommodate its losses, its development strategy was reorganized to focus largely on established franchises, and 250 of its employees were laid off in what it described as "early retirement". Namco underwent restructuring to increase its income, which included the shuffling of its management and the announcement of production of games for Nintendo's GameCube and Microsoft's Xbox.

Following its financial struggles, Namco's arcade division underwent mass reorganization. This division achieved strong success with Taiko no Tatsujin, a popular drum-based rhythm game where players hit a taiko drum controller to the beat of a song. Taiko no Tatsujin became a best-seller and created one of the company's most popular and prolific franchises. Namco's North American divisions, in the meantime, underwent reorganization and restructuring as a result of decreasing profits.

Namco Hometek was stripped of its research and development divisions following Namco's disappointment in the quality of its releases. Its continuing expansion into other non-video game divisions, including rehabilitation electronics and travel agency websites, prompted the creation of the Namco Incubation Center, which would control these businesses. The Incubation Center also hosted the Namco Digital Hollywood Game Laboratory game school, which designed the sleeper hit Katamari Damacy (2004).

Nakamura resigned as company president later in the year, being replaced with Kyushiro Takagi. Anxious about the company's continuing financial struggles, Nakamura suggested that Namco begin looking into the possibility of merging with another company. Namco first looked to Final Fantasy developer Square and Dragon Quest publisher Enix, offering to combine the three companies into one. Yoichi Wada, the president of Square, disliked Namco's financial showing and declined the offer. Square instead agreed to a business alliance with Namco. Following this, Namco then approached Sega, a company struggling to stay afloat after the commercial failure of the Dreamcast.

Sega's development teams and extensive catalog of properties caught Namco's interest, and believed a merge could allow the two to increase their competitiveness. Sega was already discussing a merge with pachinko manufacturer Sammy Corporation; executives at Sammy were infuriated at Sega's consideration of Namco's offer. A failed attempt to overturn the merge led Namco to withdraw its offer the same day Sega announced it turned down Sammy's. While Namco stated it was willing to negotiate with Sega on a future deal, Sega turned down the idea.

Shigeichi Ishimura, the son in-law of Nakamura, succeeded Takagi as Namco president on April 1, 2005; Nakamura retained his role as the company's executive chairman. This was part of Namco's continuing efforts at reorganizing itself to be in line with changing markets. On July 26, as part of its 50th anniversary event, Namco published NamCollection—a compilation of several of its PlayStation games—for the PlayStation 2 in Japan.

Namco also opened the Riraku no Mori, a companion to its Namja Town park that held massage parlors for visitors; Namco believed it would help make relaxation a source of entertainment. The Idolmaster, a rhythm game that incorporated elements of life simulations, was widely successful in Japan and resulted in the creation of a multi-million-grossing franchise.

=== Bandai takeover and dissolution (2005–2006) ===
In early 2005, Namco began merger talks with Bandai, a manufacturing toy and anime production company. The two discussed a year prior about a possible business alliance after Namco collaborated with Bandai subsidiary Banpresto to create and develop an arcade & PS2 game called Mobile Suit Gundam: One Year War based on Mobile Suit Gundam. Bandai showed interest in Namco's game development skills and believed combining this with its wide library of profitable characters and franchises, such as Sailor Moon and Tamagotchi, could increase their competitiveness in the industry.

Nakamura and Namco's content development division advisors pushed against the idea, as they felt Bandai's corporate model would not blend well with Namco's more agricultural work environment. Namco's advisors were also critical of Bandai for focusing on promotion and marketing over quality. As Namco's financial state continued to deteriorate, Ishimura pressured Nakamura into supporting the merger. Bandai's offer was accepted on May 2, with both companies stating in a joint statement their financial difficulties were the reason for the merger.

The business takeover, where Bandai acquired Namco for ¥175.3 billion ($1.7bn), was finalized on September 29. An entertainment conglomerate named Namco Bandai Holdings was established the same day; while their executive departments merged, Bandai and Namco became independently-operating subsidiaries of the new umbrella holding company. Kyushiro Takagi, Namco's vice chairman, was appointed chairman and director of Namco Bandai Holdings. The combined revenues of the new company were estimated to be ¥458 billion ($4.34bn), making Namco Bandai the third-largest Japanese game company after Nintendo and Sega Sammy Holdings.

As its parent company was preparing for a full business integration, Namco continued its normal operations, such as releasing Ridge Racer 6 as a launch game for the newly unveiled Xbox 360 in October and collaborating with Nintendo to produce the arcade game Mario Kart Arcade GP. The company honored the 25th anniversary of its Pac-Man series with Pac-Pix, a puzzle game for the Nintendo DS, and entered the massively multiplayer online game market with Tales of Eternia Online, an action role-playing game based on its Tales franchise.

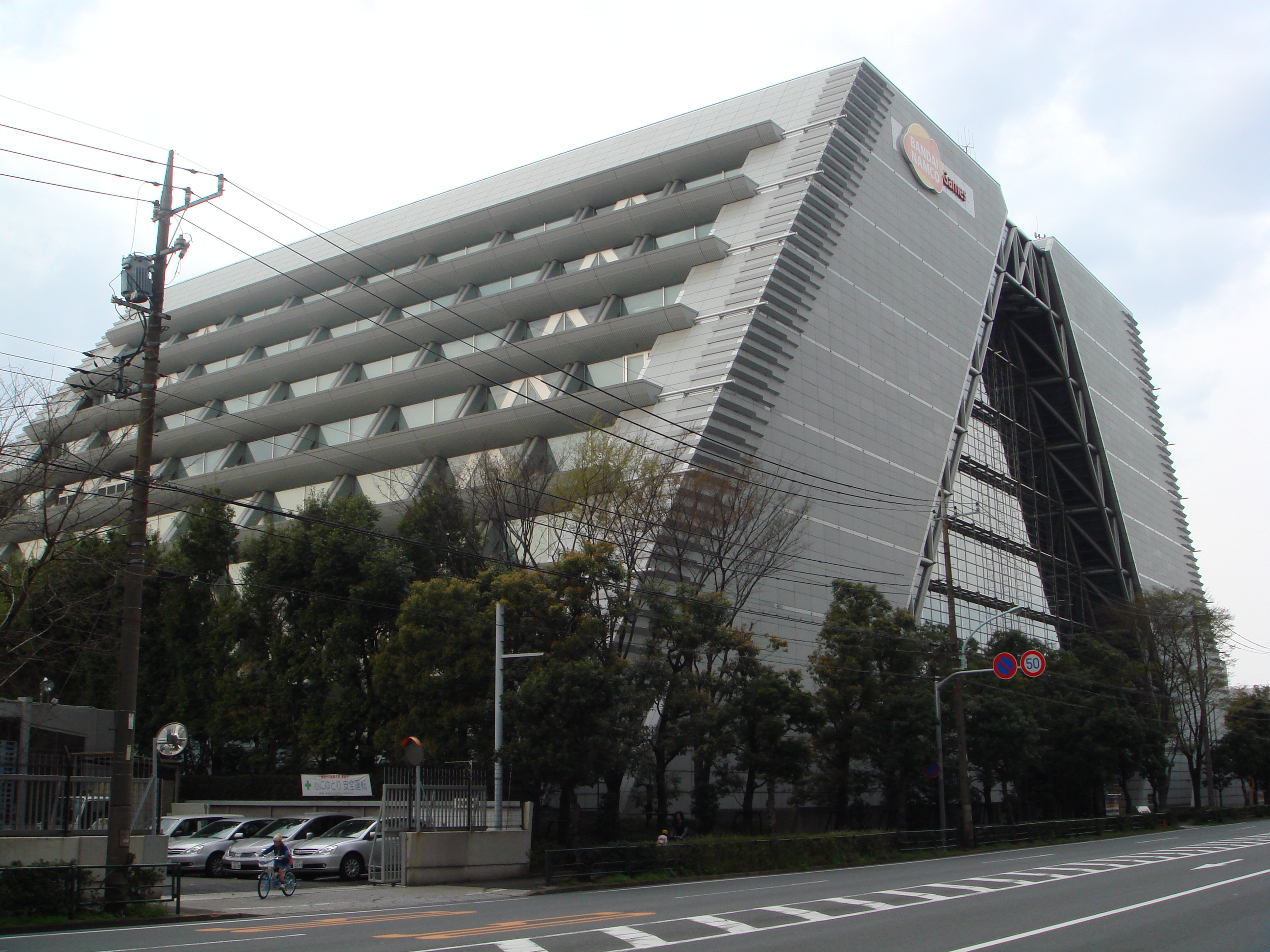
Former Namco Bandai Games (Bandai Namco Entertainment) headquarters in Shinagawa, Tokyo

On January 4, 2006, Namco's American game developing division Namco Hometek was merged with Bandai's American consumer game division Bandai Games to create Namco Bandai Games America Inc., absorbing Namco America's subsidiaries and completing Namco and Bandai's merge in North America and was housed within Namco Hometek's former premises. Namco's console game, business program, mobile phone, and research facility divisions were merged with Bandai's console division to create a new company, Namco Bandai Games, on March 31, as Namco was effectively dissolved.

The Namco name was repurposed for a new Namco Bandai subsidiary the same day, which absorbed its predecessor's amusement facility and theme park operations. Both Namco and Bandai continued working independently under the newly formed Bandai Namco Holdings until 31 March 2006, when its video game operations were merged to form Namco Bandai Games. On October 30, Namco's European video game division would merge with Bandai's European game division as well, forming Namco Bandai Games Europe S.A.S.

Namco's European division was folded into Namco Bandai Networks Europe on January 1, 2007, as it was reorganized into the company's mobile game and website division. Until April 2014, Namco Bandai Games used the Namco logo on its games to represent the brand's legacy.

The Namco Cybertainment division was renamed Namco Entertainment in January 2012, and to Namco USA in 2015. A division of Bandai Namco Holdings USA, Namco USA worked with chains such as AMC Theatres to host its video arcades in their respective locations. The second Namco company was renamed Bandai Namco Amusement on April 1, 2018, following a corporate restructuring by its parent. Amusement took over the arcade game development branch of Bandai Namco Games, which renamed itself to Bandai Namco Entertainment in 2015.

Namco USA was absorbed into Bandai Namco Amusement's North American branch in 2021 following its parent company's decision to exit the arcade management industry in the United States. This makes Namco Enterprises Asia and Namco Funscape―Bandai Namco's arcade division in Europe―the last companies to use the original Namco trademark in their names. Bandai Namco Holdings and its subsidiaries continue to use the Namco name for a variety of products, including mobile phone applications, streaming programs, and eSports-focused arcade centers in Japan.

== Legacy ==
Namco was one of the world's largest producers of arcade games, having published over 300 since 1978. Many are considered some of the greatest games of all time, including Pac-Man, Galaga, Xevious, Ridge Racer, Tekken 3, and Katamari Damacy.

Pac-Man is considered one of the most important video games ever made, having helped encourage originality and creative thinking within the industry. Namco was recognized for the game's worldwide success in 2005 by Guinness World Records; by that timeframe, Pac-Man sold over 300,000 arcade units and grossed over $1 billion in quarters globally. In an obituary for Masaya Nakamura in 2017, Nintendo Life's Damien McFerran wrote: "without Namco and Pac-Man, the video game arena would be very different today."

Namco's corporate philosophy and innovation have received recognition from publications. In a 1994 retrospective on the company, a writer for Edge described Namco as being "among the true pioneers of the coin-op business", a developer with a catalog of well-received and historically significant games. The writer believed that Namco's success lay in its forward-thinking and firmness on quality, which they argued made it stand out from other developers. A staff member of Edge's sister publication, Next Generation, wrote in 1998: "In a world where today's stars almost always become tomorrow's has-beens, Namco has produced consistently excellent games throughout most of its history." The writer credited the company's connections with its players and its influential releases, namely Pac-Man, Xevious, and Winning Run, as the keys to its success in a rapidly changing industry.

Publications and industry journalists have identified Namco's importance to the industry. Hirokazu Hamamura, chief editor of Famitsu, credited the company's quality releases to the rise in popularity of video game consoles, and, in turn, the entirety of Japan's video game industry. Writers for Ultimate Future Games and Official UK PlayStation Magazine have credited the company and its games to the early success of the PlayStation, one of the most iconic entertainment brands worldwide. In addition, Official UK PlayStation Magazine wrote that Namco serves as "the godfather of game developers", and one of the most important video game developers in history.

Staff for IGN in 1997 claimed that Namco represents the industry as a whole, with games like Pac-Man and Galaga associated with and representing video games. They wrote: "Tracing the history of Namco is like tracing the history of the industry itself. From its humble beginnings on the roof of a Yokohama department store, to the impending release of Tekken 3 for the PlayStation, Namco has always stayed ahead of the pack." In 2012, IGN listed Namco among the greatest video game companies of all time, writing that many of its games—including Galaga, Pac-Man, Dig Dug, and Ridge Racer—were of consistent quality and helped define the industry as a whole.

== See also ==
- List of Namco games
- Namcot Collection
