= List of Bandai Namco video game franchises =

List of all video game franchises by Bandai Namco Holdings

Bandai Namco Holdings is a Japanese holdings company, based in Tokyo, that specializes in video games, anime, toys, arcades and amusement parks. The company was formed following the merger of Bandai and Namco on September 29, 2005, with both companies' assets being merged into a single corporate entity. The core video game branch of the company is Bandai Namco Entertainment, formerly called Namco Bandai Games, which develops games for home consoles, arcades and mobile phones internationally. Bandai Namco is best known for its video game franchises; Pac-Man is its highest-grossing franchise with over US$12.8 billion by 2016, while Tekken is its best-selling franchise with over 49 million copies across multiple platforms. By the late 2010s, Bandai Namco was the largest toy company by revenue and the eighth-largest video game company.

Bandai Namco owns former developer Banpresto, which operates as a toy company in Japan and was purchased in 2006, and acquired a 95% stake in D3 Publisher in 2009. The company owns the video game assets of defunct developer BEC, which merged with Banpresto in 2011 to form B.B. Studio. Bandai Namco also owns the video game rights to several anime licenses, notably Dragon Ball; in this instance, the first entry for these franchises will list the first game developed or published by Bandai Namco or a subsidiary company, even if the series did not begin at that time.

== Franchises ==
Bandai Namco franchises
Franchise	First game	Released	Latest game	Released	Ref.
Ace Combat	Air Combat	1995	Ace Combat 8: Wings of Theve	2026	
Ace Driver	Ace Driver	1994	Ace Driver 3: Final Turn	2008	
Alpine Racer	Alpine Racer	1995	Super Alpine Racer	2014	
Another Century's Episode*	Another Century's Episode	2005	Another Century's Episode Portable	2011	
Ar Tonelico	Ar Tonelico: Melody of Elemia	2006	Ar Tonelico Qoga	2010	
Babylonian Castle Saga	The Tower of Druaga	1984	The Labyrinth of Druaga	2011	
Baraduke	Baraduke	1985	Baraduke II	1988	
Bosconian	Bosconian	1981	Final Blaster	1990	
Bravoman	Bravoman	1988	Bravoman: Binja Bash!	2013	
Compati Hero*	SD Battle Ōzumō: Heisei Hero Bash	1991	Lost Heroes 2	2015	
Cyber Sled	Cyber Sled	1993	Cyber Commando	1995	
Dark Souls	Dark Souls	2011	Dark Souls: Remastered	2018	
Dig Dug	Dig Dug	1982	Dig Dug Island	2008	
Digimon	Digital Monster Ver. S: Digimon Tamers	1998	Digimon Story: Time Stranger	2025	
Dōchūki	Yōkai Dōchūki	1987	F1 Dōchūki	1991	
Dragon Ball*	Dragon Ball: Shenron no Nazo	1986	Dragon Ball: Sparking! Zero	2024	
Family Stadium	Pro Baseball: Family Stadium	1986	Pro Baseball: Famista 2020	2020	
Final Lap	Final Lap	1987	Final Lap Special	2002	
Galaxian	Galaxian	1979	Galaga Revenge	2019	
Genpei Tōma Den	Genpei Tōma Den	1986	Samurai Ghost	1992	
God Eater	God Eater	2010	God Eater 3	2018	
Golly! Ghost!	Golly! Ghost!	1990	Golly! Ghosts! Goal!	1996	
Gundam	Kidou Senshi Gundam Part 1	1983	Mobile Suit Gundam: Extreme Vs. Maxi Boost ON	2020	
Gunpey	Gunpey	1999	Gunpey Flower Carnival	2017	
.hack	.hack//Infection	2002	.hack//G.U. Last Recode	2017	
The Idolmaster	The Idolmaster	2005	GAKUEN Idolm@ster	2024	
Katamari	Katamari Damacy	2004	Once Upon a Katamari	2025	
Klonoa	Klonoa: Door to Phantomile	1997	Klonoa Phantasy Reverie Series	2022	
Little Nightmares	Little Nightmares	2017	Little Nightmares III	2025	
Mappy	Mappy	1983	Mappy World	2011	
Mojipittan	Kotoba no Puzzle: Mojipittan	2001	Kotoba no Puzzle: Mojipittan Encore	2020	
MotoGP*	MotoGP	2000	MotoGP	2006	
Mr. Driller	Mr. Driller	1999	Mr. Driller Drill Land	2020	
Namco Generations	Pac-Man Championship Edition DX	2010	Galaga Legions DX	2011	
Namco Museum	Namco Museum Vol. 1	1995	Namco Museum Archives	2020	
Naruto*	Naruto: Konoha Ninpouchou	2003	Naruto x Boruto: Ultimate Ninja Storm Connections	2023	
Numan Athletics	Numan Athletics	1993	Mach Breakers	1995	
One Piece*	One Piece: Become the Pirate King!	2000	One Piece: Pirate Warriors 4	2020	
Pac-Man	Pac-Man	1980	Pac-Man World 2 Re-Pac	2025	
Point Blank	Point Blank	1994	Point Blank X	2016	
Pole Position	Pole Position	1982	Pole Position Remix	2008	
Project X Zone*	Project X Zone	2012	Project X Zone 2	2015	
Raiden	Raiden	1990	Raiden Fighters Remix Collection	2026	
Rally-X	Rally-X	1980	Rally-X Rumble	2011	
Ridge Racer	Ridge Racer	1993	Ridge Racer Draw & Drift	2016	
Rolling Thunder	Rolling Thunder	1986	Rolling Thunder 3	1993	
Sailor Moon*	Bishoujo Senshi Sailor Moon	1992	Sailor Moon Drops	2015	
Simple	Simple 1500 Series Vol. 1: THE Mahjong	1998	Family Party: 30 Great Games Obstacle Arcade	2012	
Sky Kid	Sky Kid	1985	Sky Kid Deluxe	1986	
Soulcalibur	Soul Edge	1995	Soulcalibur VI	2018	
Splatterhouse	Splatterhouse	1988	Splatterhouse	2010	
Star Luster	Star Luster	1985	Star Ixiom	1999	
Steel Gunner	Steel Gunner	1991	Steel Gunner 2	1992	
Summon Night	Summon Night	2000	Summon Night 6: Lost Borders	2016	
Super Robot Wars*	Super Robot Wars	1991	Super Robot Wars Y	2025	
Suzuka 8 Hours*	Suzuka 8 Hours	1992	Suzuka 8 Hours 2	1993	
Sword Art Online*	Sword Art Online: Infinity Moment	2013	Sword Art Online: Alicization Lycoris	2020	
Tales	Tales of Phantasia	1995	Tales of Arise	2021	
Taiko no Tatsujin	Taiko no Tatsujin	2001	Taiko no Tatsujin Nijiiro Version	2020	
Tank Battalion	Tank Battalion	1980	Shingun~Destroy! Girl's Tank Battalion	2014	
Tekken	Tekken	1994	Tekken 8	2024	
Thunder Ceptor	Thunder Ceptor	1986	3-D Thunder Ceptor II	1986	
Time Crisis	Time Crisis	1995	Time Crisis 5	2015	
Valkyrie	Valkyrie no Bōken	1986	The Glory of Walküre II	2009	
Wagan	Wagan	1987	Chibikko Wagan no Ōkina Bōken	2009	
Wangan Midnight*	Wangan Midnight	2001	Wangan Midnight: Maximum Tune 6RR	2021	
We Ski	We Ski	2008	We Ski & Snowboard	2009	
Winning Run	Winning Run	1988	Winning Run '91	1991	
Wonder Momo	Wonder Momo	1987	Wonder Momo: Typhoon Booster	2014	
World Stadium	Pro Baseball: World Stadium	1988	World Stadium 5	2001	
Xenosaga	Xenosaga Episode I	2002	Xenosaga Episode III	2006	
Xevious	Xevious	1983	Xevious Resurrection	2009	

== See also ==
- List of Bandai Namco games
- List of Namco games
