= Namco Super Wars =

2002 video game

- Developer: Namco
- Publisher: Bandai
- Designer: Tsutomu Uchida
- Platform: WonderSwan Color
- Release: JP: October 31, 2002
- Genre: Tactical role-playing game
- Mode: Single-player

Namco Super Wars (ナムコスーパーウォーズ) is a tactical role-playing game developed by Namco and published by Bandai for the Wonderswan Color. It is a crossover game, featuring characters from several classic Namco titles. This game is one of a few games jointly worked on by Bandai and Namco before their merger into Bandai Namco Holdings in 2005.

== Gameplay ==
The game is played on a square grid, on which both the player's and computer's units are placed. Each side takes turns moving and making actions with their units. Every character has a variety of attacks and special moves that can be selected when performing an action. Some of these consume Spirit Points, which slowly regenerate each turn. The game is divided into stages. Between each stage, the player is able to visit a shop and prepare their units before starting the next stage. Unlike most RPGs, characters do not gain levels for directly defeating opponents. Instead, completion of a map will reward the players with a number of level ups, which they can then distribute among their units as they wish.

== Characters ==
As a crossover game, Namco Super Wars includes characters from a number of previous Namco games. The games represented are the following:

- Valkyrie no Bōken: Toki no Kagi Densetsu / Valkyrie no Densetsu
- Dragon Buster / Dragon Valor
- Dragon Spirit
- The Tower of Druaga
- Genpei Tōma Den
- Mappy
- Dig Dug
- Phelios
- Wonder Momo
- Bravoman
- Family Stadium

== Legacy ==
Although no sequel was ever planned, a later crossover game, Namco X Capcom was another tactical role playing game that used many of the same characters.
