= Bravoman =

1988 video game

- Japanese arcade flyer
- Developer: Namco (Note: TurboGrafx-16 version developed by Now Production.)
- Publisher: Namco: NA: NEC
- Director: Norio Nakagata
- Composer: Norio Nakagata
- Series: Bravoman
- Platforms: Arcade, PC Engine/TurboGrafx-16, mobile phone
- Release: Arcade: JP: May 1988; PC Engine/TurboGrafx-16: JP: July 13, 1990; NA: October 1990; Mobile: JP: October 28, 2010
- Genre: Beat 'em up
- Modes: Single-player, multiplayer
- Arcade system: Namco System 1

Bravoman (Note: Japanese: 超絶倫人ベラボーマン, Hepburn: Chōzetsurinjin Berabōman; "Super Unequaled Human: Bravoman") is a 1988 beat 'em up video game developed and published by Namco for arcades. Described as a "comical action game", the player controls the titular character, a bionic superhero with telescopic limbs, as he must defeat the villainous Dr. Bomb ("Dr. Bakuda" in Japan) before he takes over the world. Bravoman can use his arms, legs and head to defeat enemies, and can also crouch and jump over them. The game runs on the Namco System 1 arcade board.

Conceived by Namco composer Norio Nakagata, Bravoman is a homage to 1960s tokusatsu films, parodying common tropes found in the genre, and Nakagata's love for synthesizer music. Many former staff members from Toei Animation were hired for the project, leading to the game's distinct art style influenced by anime. Bravoman's real identity, known as Hitoshi Nakamura, is a caricature of Namco's then-president Masaya Nakamura, whom the game was dedicated to. It is Namco's only video game to use pressure-sensitive buttons, which were reportedly easy to break. Following its initial release, Bravoman was ported to a handful of systems, including the PC Engine/TurboGrafx-16, which received an international release, and Japanese mobile phones.

In Japan, Bravoman was widely successful, receiving high praise for its gameplay and humor. However, it received much more negative coverage from western publications, who disliked its mechanics, difficulty, and inferiority to other games in the genre. The game spawned a shooter spin-off, Pistol Daimyo no Boken, in 1990. Bravoman has since gained notoriety from its revival through the now-defunct ShiftyLook division of Namco Bandai Games, who produced a webcomic and animated series based on the game. ShiftyLook also produced an endless runner based on the comic, Bravoman: Binja Bash!, for cellular devices. A true sequel was in production towards the end of the 1980s, but was cancelled when the developers grew concerned that its concept would not work as a game.

== Gameplay ==
Bravoman fighting Black Bravo, the game's first boss.

In Bravoman, the player controls the titular character, a bionic superhero who possesses telescopic limbs, in his mission to stop the evil scientist Dr. Bomb from taking over the world. Bravoman can punch, kick, and headbutt enemies to defeat them; the game uses pressure-sensitive buttons, where the harder the button is pressed, the stronger the player's attack is. Bravoman can also jump over enemies and other obstacles in his way. He also has a health meter at the bottom-left of the screen, which will deplete when he is hit by an enemy or projectile. Most enemies leave behind small items known as "Fuku" when defeated. Collecting ten Fuku will cause Bravoman's robotic friend Lottery Man to appear, who will give him a random powerup item. These include rice balls and noodles that will refill a portion of his health, a star that gives him the ability to fire atomic blasts from his fists, a drink that grants temporarily invincibility, and a bullet train that will warp him to the end of the level.

The game features 33 stages. Some of these levels take place underwater and transition the gameplay into a horizontal-scrolling shooter, transforming Bravoman into a submarine that can fire missiles at enemies. Most stages feature a boss at the end that must be defeated in order to progress. The most common boss the player fights is Black Bravo, an evil clone of Bravoman that mimics his attacks. Other bosses include the cyborg ninja Waya-Hime; a mechanical version of the king of Atlantis; and Pistol Daimyo, a shogun with a cannon attached to his head. The first level acts as a tutorial, with a robot alien named Alpha Man teaching the player how to play the game. In the last level, the player must fight Dr. Bomb himself. Some levels act as bonus levels, featuring many power-ups and little to no enemies.

== Plot ==
The storyline in Bravoman is told through the game's attract mode sequence, alongside various pieces of promotional material. When Japanese car insurance salaryman Hitoshi Nakamura is walking home one day, he encounters a strange, humanoid-like alien named Alpha Man, who claims to be from the planet Alpha. He informs Nakamura of a mad scientist named Dr. Bomb, who plans to destroy Earth and enslave the human race through his army of robots and a deadly superweapon. Alpha hands Nakamura three items; a metal rod, a tuning fork, and a ¥100 coin, which transforms him into Bravoman, a bionic tokusatsu superhero who possesses telescopic limbs. Bravoman and Alpha Man set out to stop Dr. Bomb and prevent him from taking over the world.

== Development and release ==
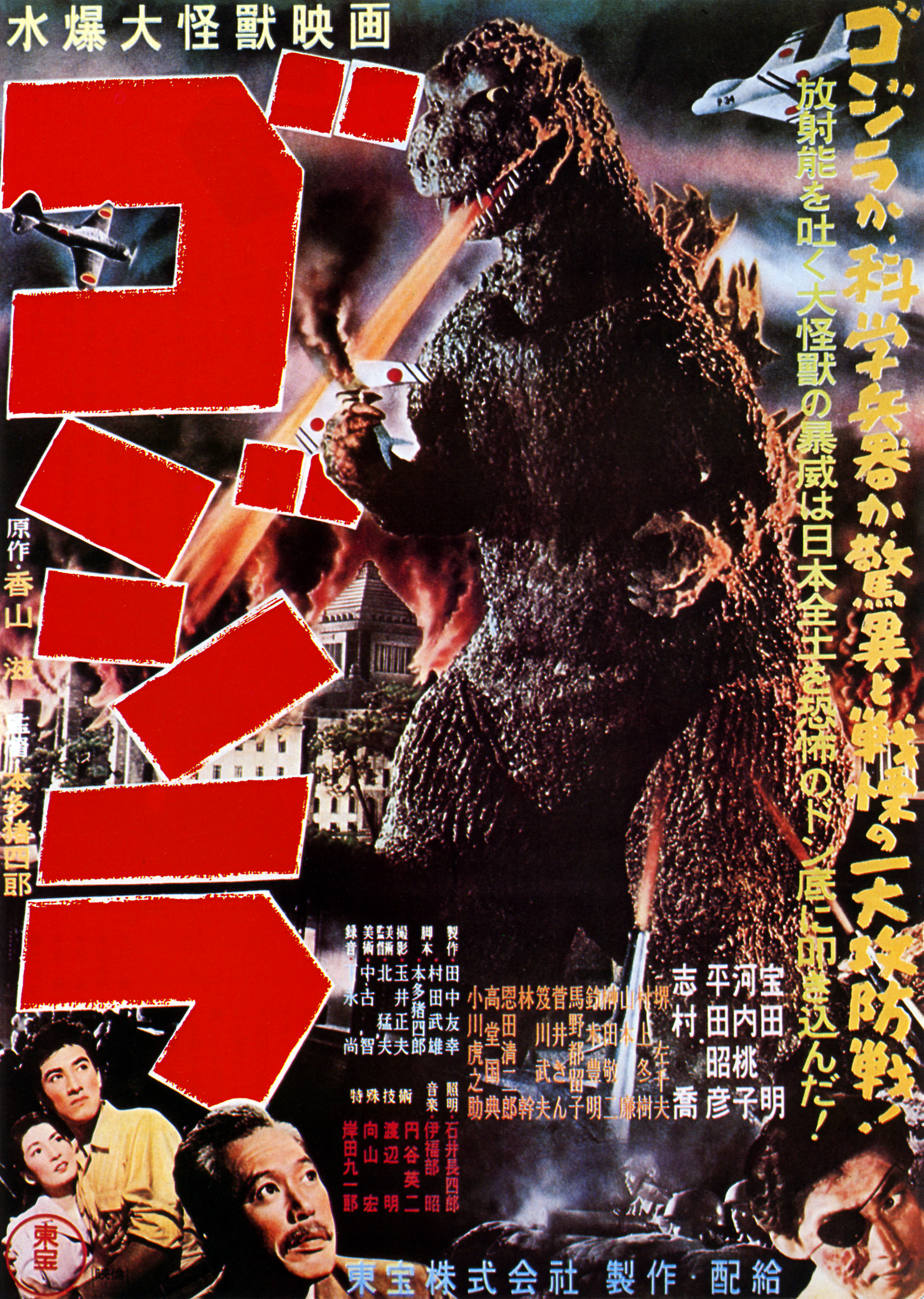
Bravoman was heavily inspired by Japanese kaiju and tokusatsu films, namely Godzilla.

Bravoman was the creation of Namco composer Norio Nakagata, who joined the company in the mid-1980s. He had previously directed the arcade game Genpei Tōma Den (1986), a hack and slash platform title that is claimed to be an early precursor to Bravoman. His goal for the project was to create an arcade game based on things he personally enjoyed, such as synthesizer music and films from the 1930s. Nakagata was heavily inspired by Japanese tokusatsu movies and kaiju monsters such as Godzilla. Much of the game's content was made to parody common tropes found in tokusatsu films and other video games. Toei Animation assisted in character design and sprite animation, after taking an interest in the game's anime-like artstyle and characters. Bravoman is Namco's only video game to utilize pressure-sensitive buttons, where the harder the player pushed them the stronger their attack was in the game. These buttons were notoriously faulty and fragile, to the annoyance of Namco technicians. Bravoman's real identity, Hitoshi Nakamura, is a caricature of company founder and president Masaya Nakamura, whom the game was dedicated to. The game's title is a nod to a nickname given to a fellow employee of Nakagata worked with in the past.

Bravoman was released in May 1988 in Japan, running on the Namco System 1 arcade hardware. It was ported to the TurboGrafx-16 in October 1990, being the game's first appearance outside Japan. Developed by Now Production, it features numerous changes to the game, such as new and altered stage designs, additional enemy types and Bravoman's attacks being changed due to the system lacking pressure-sensitive buttons. The port was localized and released outside Japan by NEC; this version was criticized for its clumsy and nonsensical English translation, prompting fans to develop unofficial patches to address this issue. The TurboGrafx-16 version was digitally re-released onto the Wii Virtual Console in 2007, followed by the arcade version in Japan in 2009. Bravoman was ported to Japanese mobile phones on October 28, 2010 for the EZweb, i-Mode and S! Appli network services, featuring new stages and remastered visuals and audio. Hamster Corporation released the game as part of their Arcade Archives series for the Nintendo Switch and PlayStation 4 in June 2023.

== Reception ==
Reception

Review scores
Publication	Score
Electronic Gaming Monthly	7/10, 5/10, 4/10, 5/10
Famitsu	26/40
GameSpot	2.9/10
IGN	6.5
Nintendo Life	4//10

Award
Publication	Award
Gamest	Grand Prize 3rd Best Ending Prize 3rd Annual Hit Game 12th

Bravoman received high praise when it was first released in arcades. The video game publication Gamest gave it several awards, including 3rd Grand Prize, 3rd Best Ending, and 12th Annual Hit Game. In their 1991 mook The Best Game, they commended its gameplay for being fun and balanced in terms of its difficulty, and also praised the parodies and spoofs of Japanese pop culture and movies. They also liked the game's level variety, randomness, and colorful graphics. The character of Bravoman was given the first place award for Best Character based on reader vote, while the game itself was placed at the 23rd spot for the best arcade games of all time up to that point.

The TurboGrafx-16 conversion received more mixed coverage. Japanese magazine Monthly PC Engine said it was an excellent port of the arcade original, and liked its new levels and refinements to the gameplay. Maru PC Engine also liked the port for its accuracy, but criticized its difficulty for being too high and making the game unnecessarily frustrating. Famitsu applauded Namco for their efforts in translating the arcade game to an underpowered console, but criticized the difficulty for being too high and the new levels for sometimes being frustrating or overly long. The four reviewers of Electronic Gaming Monthly wrote that the game had responsive controls and had a strange yet interesting theme, but that its concept was done many times already and in better quality. They were also critical of the game's constant voice overs for being generally annoying and overused.

The Wii Virtual Console re-release of the TurboGrafx-16 port received mostly negative reviews. Frank Provo GameSpot, who described it as "a blueprint of how to make a bad action game", was critical of its poor English translation, rough character designs, and bland backgrounds. He also disliked the player's hitbox for being too large, which as such made the game too difficult. Provo further labeled the game as "utterly atrocious" and one of the worst games available for the Virtual Console. Nintendo Life's Corbie Dillard was also critical of the game. He said that, outside of its good soundtrack, it was bland in design and suffered from poor visuals and sometimes unresponsive controls. Dillard only recommended Bravoman to hardcore side-scroller fans. Lucas M. Thomas of IGN was the most positive towards the game, specifically towards its presentation for its wackiness and bizarre nature. He said the game was a good companion piece to Vigilante and Splatterhouse, writing: "Given the choice between the three, I'd likely give a slight nod to Bravo (even if it doesn't do anything particularly well beyond its kookiness). But it's worth considering a purchase of any one of them to get a sense of that part of Hudson company history."

== Legacy ==
A sequel titled Kaettekita Bravoman (Note: Japanese: 帰ってきたベラボーマン, Hepburn: "Return of Bravoman") was in development around the late 1980s. It was to feature Bravoman, now divorced, unemployed, and homeless, fighting to win back the love of his wife and return to his former glory. It was scrapped during the concept stages as the team was not sure if the concept would work as a game.

An arcade spin-off, Pistol Daimyo no Bōken, was released in Japan in 1990. Starring the titular Pistol Daimyo, a boss from Bravoman, it is a horizontal-scrolling shooter notable for its outlandish theme and strange character designs. Bravoman appears as a playable character in the 2005 PlayStation 2 game Namco x Capcom, developed by Monolith Soft, where he is paired up with Wonder Momo; Waya-Hime also appears in the game, first as an enemy then later as a playable character. Bravoman is also featured in the tactical role-playing game Namco Super Wars for the WonderSwan Color. The arcade game Marvel Land features a parade float in the design of Bravoman fighting Waya-Hime. In 2005, Japanese company Yujin released a gashapon figure of Waya-Hime as part of their "Namco Girls" collection. One of Taki's alternate costumes in Soulcalibur II is also based on Waya-Hime.

The fighting game Super Smash Bros. For Wii U features the soundtrack for Bravoman as a selectable track for the Pac-Land stage. Pac-Man 99 also features a Bravoman visual theme as downloadable content.

=== ShiftyLook media ===
As part of Bandai Namco's ShiftyLook initiative to revive older properties, a new Bravoman webcomic was created in collaboration with Udon Entertainment, titled Bravoman: Super Unequaled Hero of Excellence. Written by Matt Moylan and illustrated by Dax Gordine, the strip premiered on March 9, 2012, and focused on comedic elements such as Bravoman's poor control of his powers, Alpha Man's lackluster attempts to teach Bravoman, Dr. Bomb's misuse of Engrish, and various examples of metahumor. The comic also introduced two new characters that never appeared in the original Bravoman game: Bravowoman, a no-nonsense female superhero, and Braveman, a self-obsessed television actor based on the North American box art for the TurboGrafx-16 version of Bravoman. The series concluded with its 300th strip on March 16, 2014, shortly after the announcement of ShiftyLook's closure. The comic is no longer available for viewing, though its first 130 strips received a published book by Udon.

An animated adaptation of the comic by Copernicus Studios premiered via ShiftyLook's YouTube channel on May 20, 2013, and ran for twelve episodes, concluding on February 12, 2014. The series was written by Moylan and Jim Zub, and featured the voices of Rob Paulsen as Bravoman and Alpha Man; Dee Bradley Baker as Dr. Bomb and Black Bravo, renamed Anti-Bravoman as in the comic; Romi Dames as Waya-Hime; and Jennifer Hale as Bravowoman. The web series was later removed from YouTube along with ShiftyLook's channel, and is currently legally unavailable for viewing. Bravoman: Binja Bash!, an endless runner based on the comic, was released for iOS and Android devices on August 30, 2013. The game has since been delisted and is no longer available.
