= Dig Dug Island =

Massively multiplayer online video game

- Promotional artwork
- Developer: VerX
- Publisher: Namco Bandai Games
- Director: Kazutoshi Mori
- Designer: Haruki Negi
- Series: Dig Dug
- Platform: Microsoft Windows
- Release: Beta test: JP: December 17, 2007; Public release: JP: May 8, 2008
- Genre: MMO
- Mode: Multiplayer

Dig Dug Island: Minami no Jima no Pukapukapon (Note: Japanese: ディグダグアイランド～南の島のプクプクポン～, Hepburn: Digu Dagu Airando ~ Minami no Shima no Pukupukupon ~; Dig Dug Island: The South Island Pukapukapon) was a massively multiplayer online (MMO) video game developed by VerX and published by Namco Bandai Games exclusively for Japan. Beta testing began on December 21, 2007, followed by a public release on May 8, 2008. Based on Namco's Dig Dug video game series, specifically the 1985 direct sequel Dig Dug II, up to four players were tasked with defeating each of the enemies on a large, randomly-generated island. Enemies could be defeated by either pumping them up with air until they pop, or by drilling along fault lines to sink sections of the island they are standing on into the ocean. Players were given a custom island villa that could be customized with buildings and items that could be purchased with in-game currency.

Development of the game was by VerX, a subsidiary of Japanese company Vector Corporation. The idea for the game began in 2004 by director Kazutoshi Mori, who wished to create online-focused remakes of older Namco games and compile them into a service, similar to the Namco Museum series. Due to his work on Tales of Eternia Online, Mori made the game an online-only title. The head designer, Haruki Negi, wanted the game to appeal to a more casual audience, specifically children and newcomers to the Dig Dug franchise. For the multiplayer portion, Mori created a "gondola system", which stripped host-controlled parties in favor of pre-made servers for players to join; the team added this to help encourage teamwork with other users. The game's servers shut down on April 21, 2009.

== Gameplay ==
Gameplay screenshot

Dig Dug Island was a massively-multiplayer online game based on the arcade game Dig Dug II. Up to four players were tasked with clearing an island of enemies; these being Pookas, red tomato-like enemies with goggles, and Fygars, red-winged green dragons that could breathe fire. Enemies could be defeated by either using a pump to fill them up with air until they pop, or by drilling alongside fault lines in an island to sink the sections they are standing on. Players could create their own avatars or even select ones based on characters from other Namco video games, including Mappy, The Tower of Druaga, Valkyrie no Densetsu and Wonder Momo.

Upon joining for the first time, players were given an island villa that could be heavily customized with items, which could be purchased using in-game currency known as "Sun tickets". Sun tickets could be purchased with real money, the player needing a "VerX Passport ID" account in order to purchase them. Friends and other players were able to visit the player's island and chat with others. An online tutorial was made available through the game's official website. VerX would also host promotions in-game during holidays, where players could get exclusive items by logging in during a set time period.

== Development ==
Dig Dug Island was first conceived in 2004 by Kazutoshi Mori, who worked for Japanese online game developer VerX, a subsidiary of Vector Corporation. Mori, who previously helped develop Tales of Eternia Online, was interested in creating online-focused remakes of older Namco franchises, and to compile them into a Namco Museum-like game service. An online version of Dig Dug was to be the first of these, beginning development in 2005. Mori and the development team created five possible gameplay concepts, one of which being an eight-person multiplayer version of Dig Dug II - this idea was the most well-received of the bunch, leading the team to incorporate it into the game. Haruki Negi was assigned as the project's designer, who wanted the game to appeal to a more casual audience, namely children and newcomers to the Dig Dug franchise, being made to be easily accessible and simplistic in nature. A 3D graphics style was briefly considered, which was replaced with 2D game sprites on a 3D background.

The online multiplayer was directly inspired by MMORPG games. Mori was displeased with host-operated groups, and wanted the multiplayer to be based on teamwork and building a community rather than restricting it to only friends. To accommodate this, the development team created a "gondola system", where players could join pre-set parties with other users, as opposed to having to wait for parties to be open or to wait for a host to set up one. Negi thought the system would encourage others to work together. The eight-person multiplayer aspect was instead altered to have half of the players on one island and the other half on another, as having eight players on the same island made gameplay too chaotic. The custom villas were inspired by real-time strategy games, a genre Mori was a fan of; in order to allow more people to join the game, most items could be purchased using the "Sun ticket" in-game currency, although other items could be purchased using real-world currency. A closed beta test began on December 21, 2007, followed by a public release on May 8, 2008.

In 2009, VerX began to permanently close Dig Dug Island and the sister game Tancle, itself based on Namco Bandai's Tank Battalion franchise. Players were offered refunds for all items purchased with real money until April 21, when the game's servers were officially shut down.
