= ShiftyLook =

American webcomic company

- Company type: Division
- Industry: Comic; Video game
- Founded: March 9, 2012; 14 years ago
- Defunct: September 30, 2014; 11 years ago
- Fate: Closed by Namco Bandai Games
- Products: Webcomics
- Parent: Bandai Namco Holdings
- Website: www.shiftylook.com

ShiftyLook was an American subsidiary of Bandai Namco Holdings that was focused on revitalizing older Namco franchises, with their first step being video game webcomics based on the company's various franchises. The subsidiary later offered webtoons, anime, playable games, music, message boards, and graphic novels as well. ShiftyLook regularly held substantial exhibitions at large US comics conventions, having a major booth presences and holding large giveaways of promotional merchandise. ShiftyLook shut down on September 30, 2014.

== History ==
ShiftyLook was headed by editor-in-chief Robert Pereyda. The idea behind the company was to revive Namco's more obscure, dormant video game franchises for mediums such as webcomics and animations. Pereyda believed that entertainment formats like webcomics were largely successful, and that if these intellectual properties become popular through them, it could garner more interest in those series and make Namco Bandai interested in creating new games for them. Namco Bandai also believed that ShiftyLook was a venue for content creators to collaborate on projects, and to establish working relations with artists and developers for future projects. In an interview with CRB.com, Pereyda stated: "Basically, what we're doing is taking a look at stuff that's forgotten IPs, stuff that's sleeping, stuff that — just to be honest — some people don't care about and thinking what we can do with it. This is a big system and we know that not everything's going to succeed, but if some of them can make it to the big time, we've done a good job. We're casting a really wide net. We're doing different styles, different artists, different kinds of titles, just filling out a whole matrix of different things we can do and then seeing where that goes." If the webcomics were successful, Pereyda hoped that content such as merchandise and print versions would be available as well.

The old ShiftyLook logo

ShiftyLook officially launched on March 9, 2012. Five webcomics were announced to begin production under the company; Bravoman, Xevious, Sky Kid, Rocket Fox, and Alien Confidential: Black and White. Comics were made available for free on the website, all without advertisements aside from those for Bandai Namco's other projects. In June 2012, ShiftyLook announced that Japanese manga artist Hitoshi Ariga would begin work on a webcomic based on Klonoa, becoming the first ShiftyLook comic created outside North America. To increase their viewer base, ShiftyLook regularly attended fan conventions in their own booth, where they featured artists behind some of their comics as well as merchandise. A YouTube channel was launched in 2013, featuring short animated series based on Bravoman and Mappy. The same year, Namco Bandai released an endless runner game based on Bravoman, titled Bravoman: Binja Bash!, for iOS and Android devices. ShiftyLook also published Wonder Momo: Typhoon Booster, a sequel to Wonder Momo developed by WayForward, and Namco High, a comical dating simulator game designed by Homestuck creator Andrew Hussie. A five episode anime series based on Wonder Momo was released in early 2014 on Crunchyroll.

On March 10, 2014, ShiftyLook announced that their site would no longer be updated beginning March 20, and by September 30 the company and website would be shut down entirely. They also announced that their YouTube channel, mobile games, and other digital merchandise would be pulled. The shutdown was announced by company executive Casy Casoni, who said that ShiftyLook "battled the video games abyss and won, which means it's time for us to move on and let the hit-makers play with some new toys." Before the company's closure, Udon Entertainment published hardcover books for Bravoman, Katamari, and Wonder Momo that featured the first 100 strips. A print version of Galaga was announced but never released.

Writing for Publishers Weekly, Calvin Reid felt that ShiftyLook "looks to have failed overall" as only a few properties, namely Bravoman, Wonder Momo, and Katamari, had reached the success the company had hoped for. Rich Johnston of Bleeding Cool believes that financial difficulties were to blame for the company's downfall, despite the creative talent and marketing push behind it. Matt Moylan, the CEO of Udon and the writer for 300 strips of the Bravoman comic, described his work at ShiftyLook being "one of the most creatively rewarding experiences [he has] ever had in comics." Moylan stated that Bandai Namco likely invested too much money into ShiftyLook up front and that plans to monetize its productions did not materialize until it was too late.

== List of webcomics ==
Title	Authors	Original game	Start date	Source
Alien Confidential: Black and White		Alien Confidential		
Bravoman: Super-Unequalled Hero of Excellence	Matt Moylan and Dax Gordine	Bravoman	March 9, 2012	
Dig Dug	Various	Dig Dug	May 2012	
Dragon Spirit	Jim Zub and Erik Zo	Dragon Spirit	September 2012	
Galaga	Ryan North, Christopher Hastings, Anthony Clark	Galaga		
Golly! Ghost!	Chris Eliopoulos	Golly! Ghost!	2012	
Katamari	Alex Culang, Raynato Castro	Katamari Damacy	September 17, 2012	
Klonoa: Dream Traveller of Noctis Sol	Jim Zub, Hitoshi Ariga	Klonoa	August 2012	
Legend of the Valkyrie	Jimmy Palmiotti, Justin Gray	Valkyrie no Densetsu	June 2012	
Rapid Thunder	Jimmy Palmiotti, Juan Santacruz	Rolling Thunder	May 2, 2012	
Rocket Fox		Rocket Fox	March 9, 2012	
Scar	Edmund Shern, Brothers Harrow	Genpei Tōma Den		
Sky Kid	Jeff "Chamba" Cruz	Sky Kid	March 9, 2012	
The Five-Dimensional Adventures of Dirk Davies	Ben McCool	Warp & Warp		
Time Crisis	Marv Wolfman, JJ Kirby	Time Crisis	Cancelled	
Tower of Babel	Sam Logan and Shannon Campbell	Tower of Babel	2013	
Wagan Land	Matt Moylan and Rob Porter	Wagan Land	December 2012	
Wonder Momo: Battle Idol	Jim Zub, Erik Ko, and Omar Dogan	Wonder Momo	May 15, 2012	
Xevious	Mike Costa and Mike Norton	Xevious	March 9, 2012	

== List of animated series ==
Title	Studio	Original game	Episodes	Start date	End date	Source
Bravoman: Super-Unequalled Hero of Excellence	Copernicus Studios	Bravoman	12	May 20, 2013	February 12, 2014	
Mappy: The Beat	Scott Kurtz and Kris Straub	Mappy	13	July 22, 2013	January 20, 2014	
Wonder Momo	Graphinica	Wonder Momo	5	February 6, 2014	March 6, 2014	

== See also ==
- Namco Generations
