= Marvel Land =

1990 video game

- Arcade flyer
- Developer: Namco
- Publisher: Namco
- Platforms: Arcade, Sega Genesis
- Release: Arcade: JP: January 1990; Sega Genesis: JP: June 28, 1991; NA: 1991; EU: August 1992
- Modes: Single-player, multiplayer
- Arcade system: Namco System 2

Marvel Land is a 1990 platform video game developed and published by Namco for arcades. It was released in January 1990 in Japan only. The game was ported to the Mega Drive in 1991, with the European version renamed Talmit's Adventure. The game shares its name with the fictitious kingdom where the 1986 Japan-only Famicom game Valkyrie no Bōken: Toki no Kagi Densetsu takes place, but has no connections with it otherwise. Hamster Corporation released the game as part of their Arcade Archives series for the Nintendo Switch and PlayStation 4 in December 2022; it was only released in Japan due to licensing issues with Marvel Entertainment.

== Gameplay ==
Arcade screenshot

In Marvel Land, the player must take control of Prince Paco (Talmit in English), who is on a quest to save Princess Luxie (Wondra in English) from the evil Mole King (Japanese: 魔王モウル; Maō Mōru); the gameplay is similar to that of Nintendo's Super Mario Bros.. Power-ups make it easier for Paco to defeat enemies and collect various items to increase his score; these include dragon wings which allow Paco to jump higher and fly (to a certain extent), shoes that can allow him to walk faster for a while, and a clone powerup which allows him to whip multiple copies of himself at enemies in a line. Each of the game's four worlds take place in an amusement park (which is the eponymous "Marvel Land"), and most areas are set outside with various obstacles that must be overcome; other areas include a ride on a roller coaster, and even a walk through a funhouse. At the end of the regular outside levels, Paco must jump through a huge target to earn between 100 and 7650 (Namco's goroawase number) extra points; the remaining time will also then be added to the score.

The game's enemies are an army of moles known as "Mogles", along with a wide range of other creatures. A boss must also be fought at the end of the last area of all four worlds; they are unique in that they are played more like a minigame (rock paper scissors for Worlds 1 and 4, and tug of war for Worlds 2 and 3). After Paco defeats a boss, he rescues a fairy (Luxie after he defeats the Mole King) and is treated to a bonus stage, where he must catch falling stars for points in a float parade at night.

Some rides featured in the various levels, along with the bonus stage parade floats, contain several of Namco's earlier characters, such as Pac-Man (1980), Pooka from Dig Dug (1982), Solvalou from Xevious (1982), Mappy (1983), Grobda (1984), Gilgamesh and Ki from Tower of Druaga (1984), Paccet from Baraduke (1985), Valkyrie of Valkyrie no Bōken (NES, 1986), Wonder Momo (1987), Amul (in "one-headed" form) from Dragon Spirit (1987) and Beraboh Man (1988). The pink-and-silver female robot who appears at the start of each world, (受付小町; Uketsuke Komachi), also appears in the Namco System 12-era World Stadium games as the Nikotama Gals' catcher and in the Namco Museum series at the information desk.

== Reception ==
In Japan, Game Machine listed Marvel Land on their March 15, 1990 issue as being the eighth most-successful table arcade game of the year.

== Legacy ==
Marvel Land reappears as the setting of one of the chapters of the 2015 Nintendo 3DS game, Project X Zone 2. The game's party ends up visiting the park due to the park's name being confused with Marvel Land from Valkyrie no Bōken: Toki no Kagi Densetsu. The Sega Genesis version of the game also showed up as an occasional Video Challenge on the early-1990s Nickelodeon game show Nick Arcade.
