= Dig Dug Deeper =

2001 video game

- Developer: Creature Labs
- Publisher: Infogrames
- Series: Dig Dug
- Platform: Windows
- Release: NA: November 1, 2001
- Genre: Puzzle
- Mode: Single-player

Dig Dug Deeper is a 3D remake video game of the original Dig Dug game which was first released in 1982. It was released for Windows in 2001 by Infogrames. As well as the classic underground world, it has an outside world, much like Dig Dug II. The original concepts from the original are still there, but new ideas have been added.

== Gameplay ==
The main character, Dig Dug (who also goes by the name of Taizo Hori in other games), is equipped with his usual weapon, the pump. Gameplay progresses as Taizo Hori moves from planet to planet, each with a different number of levels, which each have underground levels. On the planet's surface, the gameplay is 3D, and there are a variety of holes. At first, there are no enemies on the surface, but Taizo Hori can still fire his pump in eight directions, the usual, plus diagonally. These holes are closed, but when first reaching a level, a Pooka will jump out, opening a mound. If Taizo Hori is maneuvered into it, the gameplay will shift to underground mode. This mode is basically the same as the original game, but with a few more features described later. The enemies can "ghost" through walls at certain times too. After all but one of the enemies are destroyed, the remaining one will begin to flee at double-speed to the top of the level, which now has a tunnel to the surface. If the player destroys it, the level ends, and Taizo Hori appears back on the surface. If it escapes, the same occurs, but now the enemy is on the surface. It still must be killed, but is harder, because its movement is no longer limited to just four directions. Gameplay goes on like this for the rest of the game.
