= Hottāman no Chitei Tanken =

1986 video game

- Cover art
- Publisher(s): Use
- Platform(s): Family Computer
- Release: JP: December 6, 1986
- Genre(s): Action
- Mode(s): Single-player

Hottāman no Chitei Tanken (ホッターマンの地底探検, lit. "Hottāman's Underground Exploration") is a Japan-exclusive video game that was released for the Family Computer in 1986.

== Gameplay ==
By the final level of the game, the tasks that players must accomplish are taxing but not impossible.

The game revolves around players digging up dirt beneath the surface, finding keys behind four doors, and then finding the door to the next level. The game has many similarities to Dig Dug, but without the boulders and with various devices like teleporting doors, speed, dynamite, and a wet suit. There are 15 levels in the entire game; which repeat themselves after the 15th level is finished.

Lava can spew out at a vertical direction towards the player and kill him; it does not reset itself even after the players loses a life (but it does reset itself after a game over) Passwords are activated by pressing a certain button combination on the password screen. Several passwords results in cheat codes that does certain things; such as deactivating the lava in all levels of the game.

Certain type of blocks are worth different points once they are dug up; ranging from common dirt to destructible blocks. The game features an instant death clause where players die in a single hit. Killed enemies reappear at the same location where they were killed the first time.
