= Pistol Daimyo no Bōken =

1990 video game

- Japanese arcade flyer
- Developer: Namco
- Publisher: Namco
- Composers: Seiichi Sakurai; Yoshie Takayanagi; Shinji Hosoe
- Platforms: Arcade, mobile phone
- Release: JP: October 1990
- Genre: Scrolling shooter
- Modes: Single-player, multiplayer

Pistol Daimyo no Bōken (Note: Japanese: ピストル大名の冒険, Hepburn: Pisutoru Daimyō no Sabaku; The Adventure of the Great Pistol Lord) is a 1990 horizontally scrolling shooter video game developed and published by Namco for arcades. It was released only in Japan in October 1990. It is a spin-off of Bravoman, with the protagonist being a boss in that game. Hamster Corporation released the game outside Japan for the first time as part of their Arcade Archives series for the Nintendo Switch and PlayStation 4 in January 2022.

== Gameplay ==
The player must take control of Pistol Daimyo, a small Japanese lord, who has a pistol strapped to his head; he faces to the right side of the screen, and is always moving forward with the backgrounds scrolling to the left, bringing enemies into view. He will float down to the ground if you stop holding the joystick up while he is in mid-air - and pressing that Firing Button will make his pistol fire a small cannonball. However, holding down the button will charge the pistol, and upon releasing the button the pistol will fire a medium or large cannonball; but even the smallest enemies take multiple hits to kill, so the small cannonballs are of little use. There are also blue (and yellow) vases which can be broken open with a medium or large cannonball, and will leave Hanafuda cards behind, for Pistol Daimyo to collect — and once he collects three of them, it shall cause a Kusudama ball to come down into view from the top of the screen (which can also be broken open with a medium or large cannonball). If he manages to do it before it goes back up off the top of the screen again, it shall leave a suit of wooden (or metal if he is already wearing the wooden one) armour behind; once he has put it on, it shall prevent him from getting killed after a single hit.

== Reception ==
Game Machine stated that Pistol Daimyo no Bōken was the third most-popular arcade game of November 1990 in Japan.

Pistol Daimyo no Bōken has gained notoriety retrospectively for its bizarre nature and high level of difficulty. Ray Barnholt of GamePro said that its cutesy visuals and lampooning of Japanese mythology made it stand out from the company's usual Galaxian, Galaga, and Xevious offerings. He described it as being "more or less like a passion project (or at worst, a goof-off time-filler) for the team that made it", and enjoyed its comedic and cartoonish presentation. While he was critical of the game's intense difficulty, Barnholt felt that Pistol Daimyo was a clever and interesting game nonetheless. In the Hardcore Gaming 101 book Namco Arcade Classics, Kurt Kalata liked the game's goofy nature, which he compared to Konami's Ganbare Goemon and Parodius series. However, he didn't think its presentation was enough to save Pistol Daimyo from its difficulty, which he blamed on the game's poor design and near-useless weapons. He wrote that: "The game is insanely difficult, and in spite of its goofy demeanor, just isn’t much fun to play." Cyber World's Hiroyuki Maeda felt it was nothing but a "waste of time", with cheap player deaths and an overly-high difficulty. While he enjoyed the look and feel of the game, he didn't think it was good enough to make the game any more enjoyable, and labeled it as a good example of a kusoge.
