= Whirlo =

1992 video game

- Developers: Nova Co., Ltd.
- Publisher: Namco
- Composers: Hiroshi Ebihara; Norihiko Togashi; Tarō Nakanobu
- Series: Valkyrie
- Platform: Super Nintendo Entertainment System
- Release: JP: July 23, 1992; PAL: 1992
- Genre: Action-platform
- Mode: Single-player

Whirlo (Note: Known in Japan as Xandra no Daibōken: Valkyrie to no Deai (Japanese: サンドラの大冒険 ワルキューレとの出逢い, Hepburn: Sandora no Daibōken: Warukyūre to no Deai; lit. "Xandra's Great Adventure: Encounter with the Valkyrie")) is a side-scrolling action-platform released by Namco on July 23, 1992 in Japan for the Super Famicom video game system, and in Europe and Australia later during the same year. The game was re-released on August 1, 1998 in Nintendo Power flash RAM cartridge format.

The game is a prequel to Valkyrie no Bōken: Toki no Kagi Densetsu and features Whirlo (known as Krino Xandra in Japan), a secondary character from the first game, in a starring role. While the character designs by Hiroshi Fuji give the game the appearance of a picture book, the degree of difficulty is high, and there are many "bad ending" scenarios.

== Gameplay ==
Gameplay screenshot

Whirlo is a side-scrolling action-platform game.

== Plot ==
The game is set in a time when the actions of the Valkyrie have become legendary. The story tells of events leading up to the initial meeting between the Valkyrie and Krino Xandra. At the beginning of the game, Xandra is living a peaceful and happy life deep in the countryside with his wife and son in the Land of Marvel.

One day, a huge explosion is heard throughout the land and a deadly dust falls from the sky, causing many people across the Land of Marvel to begin dying from a withering disease. One of those to be afflicted with the disease is Xandra's son, causing Xandra and his wife to be at a loss as to what to do. After overhearing talk of a marvelous curing medicine, Xandra sets out on a journey to find this medicine and save his son.

== Reception ==
Reception

Review scores
Publication	Score
Famitsu	24/40
GameFan	249/400
HobbyConsolas	89/100
Joypad	51%
Joystick	70%
Nintendo Life	7/10
Superjuegos	93/100
Super Play	88%
Video Games (DE)	58%
The Super Famicom	71/100

Whirlo was met with mixed reception from critics since its release, but fan reception was positive: in a poll taken by Family Computer Magazine, it received a score of 21.8 out of 30.
