= Powerball (video game) =

1991 video game

Wrestleball
- Developer: Namco
- Publisher: Namco
- Composer: Yoshinori Kawamoto
- Platform: Sega Genesis
- Release: JP: February 8, 1991; NA: April 1991
- Genre: Sports
- Modes: Single-player, multiplayer

Powerball (Note: Known in Japan as Wrestleball (Japanese: レッスルボール, Hepburn: lit. Ressuru Bōru)) is a 1991 competitive sports video game developed and published for the Sega Genesis by Namco. It was re-released for the Wii's Virtual Console in Japan on February 19, 2008, and in North America on March 24, 2008, at a cost of 800 Wii Points. This version is virtually identical to the original version. An enhanced remake of it was remade for Namco Anthology 1 for the PlayStation exclusive to Japan.

== Gameplay ==
In-game screenshot from the Sega Genesis version

The game contains elements of American football, Association football, and Rugby. Two teams square off against each other with the goal of either kicking a powerball against a backstop or running the ball into the endzone. Kicked goals are worth one point and touchdowns are worth three.

The game begins with a scramble, as the ball is dropped at the center between five players from each side. Players advance the ball toward their opponent's goal by running with it, throwing it, or kicking it. Players on offense or defense are allowed to execute any number of wrestling-type moves in order to obstruct or even knock out opponents. The goal is defended by a goal keeper who is generally faster, stronger and more durable than other player types.

Players can initially choose between eight teams representing Japan, South Korea, Brazil, Greece, USSR, United States, United Kingdom and China. After beating them in the league, we also play against teams from Mexico, Germany, Canada and in the final of France.

Team names:

- Brazil – Amazons
- Canada – Mounties
- China – Emperors
- France – Legionnaires
- Germany – Knights
- Greece – Spartans
- Japan – Samurais
- Mexico – Aztecs
- South Korea – Warriors
- United Kingdom – Pirates
- United States – Rough Riders
- USSR – Cossacks

== Reception ==
Reception

Review scores
Publication	Score
IGN	6/10
Nintendo Life	5/10
Zzap!64	94%
Beep! Mega Drive	8/10
Sega-16	6/10
