= The Adventure of Valkyrie =

1986 video game

- Famicom box art
- Developer: Namco
- Publisher: Namco
- Composer: Hiroyuki Kawada
- Series: Valkyrie
- Platforms: Famicom, arcade, mobile phone
- Release: Famicom: JP: August 1, 1986; Arcade: JP: 1986; Mobile: JP: 2006
- Genres: Role-playing, action-adventure
- Mode: Single-player

The Adventure of Valkyrie: The Legend of the Key of Time (Note: Japanese: ワルキューレの冒険 時の鍵伝説, Hepburn: Valkyrie no Bōken: Toki no Kagi Densetsu) is a 1986 action-adventure role-playing video game developed and published by Namco for the Family Computer. It was released only in Japan on August 1, 1986. It was also released for arcades through the Nintendo VS. System on the same year. A sequel, The Legend of Valkyrie, was released in arcades in 1989.

== Gameplay ==
Valkyrie surrounded by a group of enemies

The player controls Valkyrie in her quest to defeat Zouna and restore peace to Marvel Land. Valkyrie fights monsters, collects gold and finds stronger equipment which will increase her powers. Without in-game hints or advice, the player must devise a plan to defeat Zouna, with many of Valkyrie's tasks not immediately apparent; some can only be guessed by exploration and experimentation.

When Valkyrie defeats a monster, she earns experience points towards the next level and (usually) a small amount of money. Although money is scarce in Marvel Land, the player rarely needs it to buy equipment. All the game's items can be obtained for free if the player knows where to look. In addition to equipping weapons and armor, Valkyrie gains access to seven spells. When she learns each one depends on her intelligence, which increases with each level of experience. The first, and possibly the most valuable, of these is the healing spell.

== Plot ==
In Marvel Land, people coexist in peace and harmony with nature, and the animals are docile. Humans, Sandras, Quarkmen, Tattas and other races mingle, working to improve their community. A large clock tower, resembling a stone grandfather clock, stands watch over the countryside; an ancient evil was sealed in the clock long ago with a key of time (stored in the middle of its face), and the people have lost their fear.

One day, the clock tower mysteriously stops working. Before long, a villager takes it upon themselves to rewind the clock. Fumbling with the key of time, the villager drops it, and before they can pick it up, Zouna, a dark wizard who manipulates time, escapes and takes the key.

Zouna wreaks havoc in Marvel Land, darkening and terrorizing its people and laying waste to the countryside. Confident in his power, he builds a castle, ruins once-thriving towns and villages, and separates families. Only a few scattered towns remained standing, a futile bastion against Zouna's invasion. Even Krino Sandra (known as Whirlo in Europe) would be subdued heroically by Zouna; Marvel Land needs a savior.

Valkyrie, a fledgling shieldmaiden descends to Marvel Land from the heavens. In her first adventure, she wields a simple shield and a mace of light. Vowing to save Marvel Land from the darkness which has consumed it, her adventure begins.

== Development ==
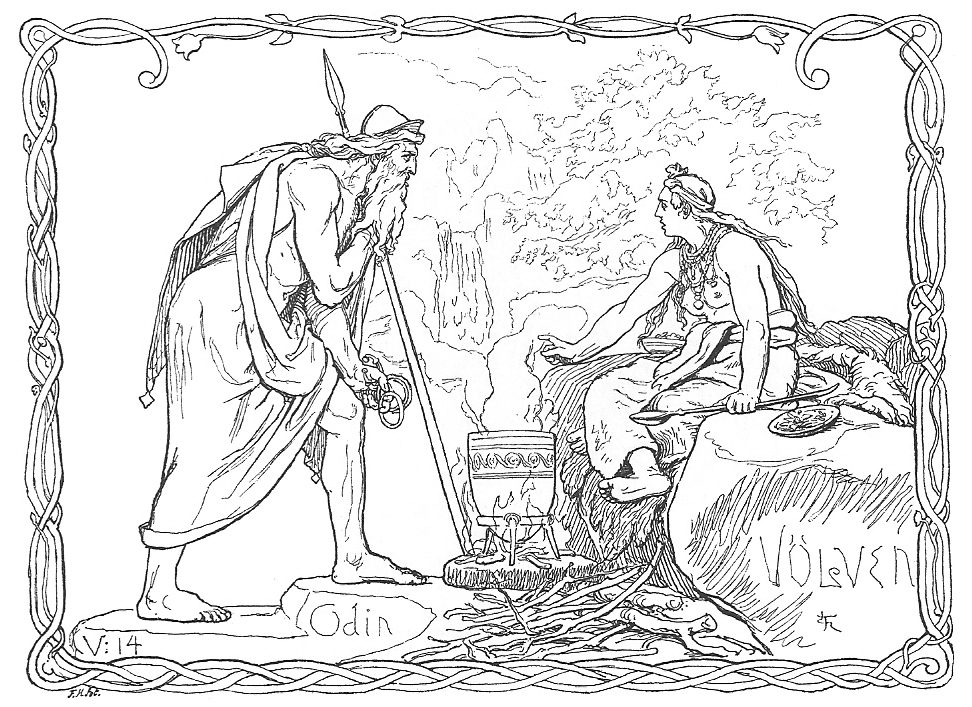
The characters and setting of Valkyrie no Bōken were based on Norse mythology.

Being one of the first third-party companies for the console, Japanese company Namco was seeing great success with their releases on Nintendo's highly-popular Family Computer. Their arcade game ports such as Pac-Man and Xevious were unprecedented successes, and generated a lot of revenue for the company. Seeing the Famicom as the next evolution in video games, Namco began to develop exclusive titles for the console instead of simply ports or remakes of their earlier arcade games. The first of these was Star Luster in 1985, a well-received space combat simulation game. With games like The Legend of Zelda being hugely popular for the console, Namco decided their next game would be a similar role-playing game, with a large, vast world and unique characters.

The Adventure of Valkyrie was conceptualized by character designer Hiroshi Fujii. Joining Namco after graduating college, Fujii was initially assigned to the company's design department, working on the package artwork for games like Sky Kid, Tower of Babel, and Family Tennis. Once the division was dissolved, he was transferred to the game development department, becoming a character artist for Valkyrie no Bōken. Fujii's drawings were used heavily for reference by the development team, acting as a design document of sorts. Due to hardware limitations, his drawings could not be accurately replicated in the game itself; most notable of these is Valkyrie herself, being blond on the cover art and having black hair in-game. Fujii looked to Norse mythology while designing the characters and setting. Valkyrie was originally depicted as a "child of the gods" in early sketches, but was changed to being a simple female warrior due to her design being drastically different from the Valkyries in Norse mythology.

== Release ==
Namco published The Adventure of Valkyrie on August 1, 1986. Included with the game was a detailed map that showed the first few areas of the game and hints on how to get some of the more valuable items. It was also released for arcades through the Nintendo VS. System on the same year.

In 1998, Namco published Namco Anthology 2 for the PlayStation, which included ports and enhanced remakes of older Namcot games. The Adventure of Valkyrie was included, alongside a remake. This remake had more arcade-like gameplay, similar to the sequel The Legend of Valkyrie instead of the original's role-playing format. Namco Anthology 2 was digitally re-released for the PlayStation Network in 2013 under the Game Archives label.

Two mobile phone versions of Valkyrie no Bōken were released in Japan. The first was in 2006 for the FOMA 900i line of phones, specifically through the i-Mode cellphone network. The second was released in 2007 by Namco Bandai Games for the S! Appli digital storefront. Both of these could be downloaded through the company's official game services through these networks for a monthly fee, and featured all new graphics in the vein of its arcade sequel Valkyrie no Densetsu. The Famicom original was published for the Wii Virtual Console in 2007 for Japan, and for the Nintendo 3DS Virtual Console in 2013 and the Wii U Virtual Console in 2015.

Hamster Corporation released the arcade version outside Japan for the first time as part of their Arcade Archives series for the Nintendo Switch and PlayStation 4 in July 2024.

== Reception ==
Reception

Review scores
Publication	Score
Jeuxvideo.com	17/20
Family Computer Magazine	22/30

== Legacy ==
The Adventure of Valkyrie was followed by The Legend of Valkyrie, a 1989 arcade game with simultaneous two-player play and a console conversion released for the PC Engine. That year an MSX2 game, Valkyrie no Bōken II, was announced; although the game demo was included on DiskStation Compilation No. 4, its production was canceled.

In 1992 Namco released a prequel, Xandra no Daibōken: Valkyrie to no Deai, for the Super Famicom. Featuring Valkyrie's green amphibian-appearing friend, Krino Sandra (Whirlo), the prequel was released in Europe as Whirlo. Valkyrie no Bōken was resurrected for the PlayStation in 1998 on Namco Anthology 2, with an upgraded (linear) version of the game side-by-side with an emulation of the Famicom original.

Walküre no Densetsu Gaiden: Rosa no Bōken is a visual novel game released by Namco for Windows on April 26, 1996. In it, the Great Goddess tasks Rosa with pursuing the monster Tōrushin on a floating island in the sky over Marvel Land. Its audio drama version was released earlier on March 25. In 2007, Namco released The Glory of Walküre, an upgrade of the original game with enhanced graphics, for Japanese cell phones using the i-Apli system.
