= Mappy World =

2011 video game

- Developer(s): Namco Bandai Games
- Publisher(s): Namco Bandai Games
- Series: Mappy
- Platform(s): Mobile Phone
- Release: JP: September 2011 (EZ)
- Genre(s): Platform game
- Mode(s): Single player

Mappy World (マッピーワールド, Mappī Warudo) is a mobile phone game released in 2011 by Namco Bandai Games in Japan only. It is a remake of the arcade game Mappy and features several enemies and mechanics from the original title.
