= Monthly Arcadia =

Japanese arcade game magazine

月刊アルカディア Monthly Arcadia
- Cover of the initial issue of the Japanese magazine Monthly Arcadia from June 2000
- Categories: Video games
- Frequency: Bi-monthly
- Publisher: Enterbrain
- First issue: December 8, 1999; 26 years ago
- Final issue Number: February 28, 2015; 168
- Company: Enterbrain
- Country: Japan
- Based in: Tokyo
- Language: Japanese

Monthly Arcadia (月刊アルカディア, Gekkan arukadia) was a Japanese arcade game magazine, published by Enterbrain.

== History ==
Monthly Arcadia launched on December 8, 1999. It was the successor to the then popular magazine Gamest by the bankrupt publisher Shinseisha. The first issue of Monthly Arcadia was subtitled "Coin op'ed videogame magazine" and later issues "Arcade video game machine magazine".

The magazine was published monthly from its start to June 2013, when its frequency was switched to bi-monthly. The last issue, cover-dated April 2015, was published in February 2015.

== Table of contents ==
Later issues of Monthly Arcadia were typically subdivided into the following sections:

- several "Feature" sections
- Special supplement (DVD)
- Game
- Index
- Ad
