= Namco Anthology =

- Anthology 1 (left) and Anthology 2 (right) covers
- Developer: Namco
- Publisher: Namco
- Platform: PlayStation
- Release: Anthology 1: JP: June 4, 1998; Anthology 2: JP: September 23, 1998
- Genre: Various
- Modes: Single-player, multiplayer

Namco Anthology (Note: Japanese: ナムコアンソロジー, Hepburn: Namuko Ansorojī) is a 1998 duology of video game compilations developed and released by Namco for the PlayStation exclusively in Japan. The two collections compile several Namco-published video games for the Family Computer, Super Famicom, and Mega Drive, in a manner similar to the company's existing Namco Museum series. Alongside ports of the original games are remakes of each game that feature enhanced graphics, sound, and gameplay.

== Overview ==
Anthology 1 menu (top) and Anthology 2 menu (bottom).

The Namco Anthology games are compilations of Namco-published video games for the Family Computer, Super Famicom, and Mega Drive. Anthology 1 includes Star Luster (1985), The Tower of Babel (1986), Sangokushi II: Haō no Tairiku (1992), and Wrestleball (1993). Anthology 2 includes Valkyrie no Bōken (1986), King of Kings (1988), Namco Classic II (1992), and Pac-Attack (1993). Unlike other Namco compilations, Namco Anthology does not use software emulation, and its games are true ports that were created from scratch to work on PlayStation hardware. The original games are accompanied by special, "arranged" versions that possess improved graphics, sound, and presentation. Some of these arrangements, such as those for Valkyrie no Bōken and Star Luster, contain entirely new gameplay or additional content that is not found in their predecessors.

The menu interfaces in each collection are presented as a website, where the games are divided into individual "webpages". The "webpages" contain information on each of the included games, alongside bonus material such as high score rankings, promotional artwork, and character biographies. Player progress is rewarded with additional artwork, information on the history of each game, and level editors that allow players to create and save custom levels to the PlayStation's memory card.

== Development and release ==
The Namco Anthology games were created by Namco as a successor to its Namco Museum series, which at the time had released its sixth and final volume for the PlayStation. During the production of the Namco Museum series, Namco received requests from fans asking for them to include titles from its home console library. The company created Namco Anthology in response to these requests and as a means to continue introducing its older catalog to newer players. Whereas Namco Museum focused on arcade games that were difficult to obtain at the time, Namco Anthology focuses on games published through its Namcot division, such as those from the Family Computer and Mega Drive. The development team considered games it thought best represented its creative talent, such as those that are considered influential or had long-lasting popularity. Namco created the remakes to update them for newer hardware and intended to only include them, however, the original versions were added as it didn't want the remakes to "get rid of" the originals.

Namco Anthology 1 was announced in January 1998 and released on June 4. Namco Anthology 2 was released on September 23 of the same year. Namco considered releasing both collections in Europe, though ultimately both remained exclusive to Japan. Namco Anthology 2 contains technical issues that prevent it from running properly on the PlayStation 2, with some games freezing up entirely. Both games were digitally re-released for the PlayStation Network on December 18, 2013 under the Game Archives series.

== Reception ==
Reception

Review scores
Publication	Score
Famitsu	28/40 (1); 32/40 (2)
Joypad	3/10 (1)
Video Games (DE)	2/4 (1)
Dengeki PlayStation	75/100, 60/100 (1); 85/100, 90/100 (2)

Award
Publication	Award
Famitsu	Gold Hall of Fame (2)

Namco Anthology 2 was ranked as the tenth best-selling game in Japan during the month of October 1998. The two have sold a combined 62,607 copies in its lifetime; 26,130 for Anthology 1 and 36,477 for Anthology 2. Famitsu staff believed Anthology 1 those that didn't grow up with the games included wouldn't enjoy it, and only Sangokushi II would be attractive to new players. Staff also believed the collection was inferior to the Namco Museum series in the aspect its games can easily be obtained on their original platforms, where as most games in Namco Museum are hard to get ahold of. Grégoire Hellot of Joypad thought Sangokushi II was the best title, but was inferior to similar tactical games such as Super Robot Wars. He didn't think the other three appealed to import gamers, and have long since been usurped by titles of better quality.
