= The Glory of Walküre =

2007 video game

- Developer(s): Namco Bandai Games
- Publisher(s): Namco Bandai Games
- Series: Valkyrie
- Platform(s): Mobile phone, Android
- Release: JP: June 2007 (i); JP: March 8, 2008 (ez); JP: July 31, 2008 (s)
- Genre(s): Action role-playing video game
- Mode(s): Single-player

The Glory of Walküre (ワルキューレの栄光, Warukyūre no Eikou) is an action role-playing video game released for Japanese mobile phones in 2007 and was later ported to the Android in 2012.

== Plot ==
The Great Goddess, concerned with the increase of evil in Marvel Land and the strengthen of the Tatta tribe, ordered Valkyrie to descent from the sky to help the people. At one point of her adventure, Valkyrie is poisoned and is saved by Sandra, who searches for an antidote for her.
