= Dig Dug II =

1985 video game

- Japanese arcade flyer
- Developer: Namco
- Publishers: Namco: NES; NA: Bandai
- Composers: Yuriko Keino; Junko Ozawa
- Series: Dig Dug
- Platforms: Arcade, Nintendo Entertainment System, Famicom Disk System, X68000, mobile phone
- Release: March 1985: Arcade; JP: March 1985 NES; JP: April 18, 1986; NA: December 1989 Famicom Disk System; JP: August 31, 1990 X68000; JP: February 24, 1995
- Genre: Action
- Modes: Single-player, multiplayer
- Arcade system: Namco Mappy

Dig Dug II (Note: Japanese: ディグダグII, Hepburn: Digu Dagu Tsu) is a 1985 action video game developed and published by Namco for arcades. It was initially only released in Japanese arcades in March 1985. It is a sequel to 1982's Dig Dug. Pookas and fire-breathing Fygars return as the enemies, but the side view tunneling of the original is replaced with an overhead view of an island maze.

== Gameplay ==
Arcade version screenshot

Dig Dug II takes place on an island with an overhead view. There are two types of enemies: Pookas (round red monsters with goggles), which can kill a player by touching him, and Fygars (dragons), which can kill a player either by touching him or breathing fire on him.

Taizo Hori (the player's character) is armed with two weapons. One is an air pump that can inflate enemies until they burst. The other is a jackhammer, which can be used at "fault lines" on the map to create faults in the ground. If a system of faults divides the island into two parts, the ground of the smaller section will sink into the ocean, killing all creatures on it, including Taizo himself if the player is not careful. The points earned from this depend on how many enemies are killed at once. Once three pieces of land have been cut off an island, a bonus vegetable will appear somewhere on what remains of the island, which can be eaten for extra points. When only one, two or (on later rounds) three enemies remain on the island, the enemies will head for the edge of the island and jump into the water, killing themselves and ending the round.

== Reception ==
Reception

Review scores
Publication	Score
AllGame	2/5
Nintendo Life	6/10
Family Computer Magazine	18/30

Dig Dug II saw some success in its first few months on the market, but the game was largely unsuccessful and not nearly as popular as its predecessor. A reviewer for the magazine Computer and Video Games said that, while having a high difficulty level, it was worth playing and became easier through practice.

In retrospective analysis, the games's departure from the original's maze-chase gameplay, its time of release, and the lack of the original's free movement are believed to have contributed to its failure.

== Legacy ==
Dig Dug II was ported to the Famicom in Japan in 1986, followed by a 1989 release for the Nintendo Entertainment System in North America (with the subtitle Trouble in Paradise added to the packaging, but not to the game itself), and then in 1990 by a release for the Famicom Disk System in Japan. Until 2005, the game was seen exclusively on the NES in North America.

In 2005, Dig Dug II was ported to the PlayStation Portable as part of Namco Museum Battle Collection, and was included in Namco Museum DS which was released for the Nintendo DS on September 18, 2007. The game was also included in Namco Museum Virtual Arcade in 2008 and was released on the Wii Virtual Console in Japan on October 20, 2009, along with the original Dig Dug. Both Dig Dug games are available as part of the Namco Museum Megamix compilation for the Wii, which was only released in North America.

A reimagined version for Microsoft Windows titled Dig Dug Island, featuring online multiplayer, was released in 2008 exclusively in Japan. However, the game's servers were shut down in just under a year, leaving it unplayable.

On March 30, 2022, the NES version of Dig Dug II was released on the Nintendo Classics service. Hamster Corporation released the arcade version as part of their Arcade Archives series for the Nintendo Switch and PlayStation 4 in April 2023.
