= Star Ixiom =

1999 video game

- Japanese cover art
- Developer: Namco
- Publishers: JP: Namco; EU: Sony Computer Entertainment
- Platform: PlayStation
- Release: JP: September 9, 1999; EU: April 14, 2000
- Genre: Space combat simulator
- Mode: Single-player

Star Ixiom (Note: Japanese: スターイクシオン, Hepburn: Sutā Ikushion) is a space combat simulator video game developed and published by Namco for the PlayStation. It is the sequel to the 1985 Family Computer game Star Luster, which was Namco's first original game for home consoles. In the game, the player controls one of seven ships in their mission to wipe out an alien race threatening the galaxy. Gameplay revolves around clearing missions to progress further, such as destroying a certain fleet of enemies or protecting a space station from enemy fire.

The game is part of the fictional United Galaxy Space Force universe, which combines many earlier Namco games into a flowing timeline. Much of the game's playable ships and enemies are based on those from other Namco games such as Galaga and Bosconian. Upon release, Star Ixiom received mixed reviews - while many applauded its visuals and controls, it was criticized for its simplicity and lack of variety in missions, with several outlets unfavorably comparing it to Colony Wars.

== Gameplay ==
In-game screenshot, showing the player shooting down an enemy.

Star Ixiom is a space combat simulator video game. The player selects one of seven different star ships, each equipped with different weapons and abilities, to fight off an alien race known as the "Unknown Intelligent Mechanized Species" (UIMS) and other extraterrestrial races. The player is given the option to select one of seven star ships, each based on other Namco video games - these include the GAIA from the original Star Luster, the Galaxip from Galaxian, and the Geosword from Starblade. Each craft has their own unique weapon load outs and abilities, such as a faster firing rate or movement speed. The player can also switch between a first and third-person view.

The game is split across three different game modes - "Training", which helps the player learn the controls and in-game mechanics, "Command", an upgraded Training mode with more enemy formations, and "Conquest", the main focus that adds missions. Missions include destroying a fleet of enemies or protecting a base from being wiped out. All three game modes will allow the player to access a map screen, displaying the placement of enemies, bases and the player's current location - the player can select any of these locations to immediately warp there.

Like the original Star Luster, the player has a limited amount of energy, which will drain as the player fires at enemies and warps to other locations. Fuel can be fully replenished by traveling to space stations found throughout the game. Once the meter fully drains, the game will be over and the player will need to continue from their last save point. In the Conquest mode, the player can acquire items and upgrades for their ship by completing missions, which can increase the strength of the ship, firing rate, or give them access to a new weapon, including a tractor beam from Gaplus.

== Development and release ==
The graphical style of Star Ixiom is based on the one found in the X68000 version of Star Luster.

Star Ixiom was directed by Yuichiro Sadahiro, known for his work on the Tales series and Katamari Damacy. It is the sequel to Star Luster, an older Namco game released for the Family Computer in 1985 that has since been ported to several other platforms. The game was billed as a "simulation and shooting" title, meant to signify the usage of elements from both tactical role-playing games and space combat simulations. It is set within Namco's United Galaxy Space Force (UGSF) saga, a fictional universe that ties together many of their space shooting games into one cohesive timeline. The development team focused on modernizing the gameplay in Star Luster while still keeping the mechanics and ideas that made the original popular intact. Its graphical style was designed after the one used in both the X68000 conversion of Star Luster and the PlayStation game Starblade Alpha. Characters and starships from the Xevious series were intended to appear in the game, but were cut at the last minute. The fictional word "Ixiom" in the game's title means "eternal truth".

Namco announced Star Ixiom in January 1999; no comment was made on an international release. It was presented at the 1999 Tokyo Game Show in March, alongside Namco's own Dragon Valor and Ace Combat 3: Electrosphere. The game was released in Japan on September 9, 1999, and in the United Kingdom on April 14, 2000. A European release followed a year later. Famitsu released a guidebook to coincide with its release, detailing its world, gameplay and characters. A soundtrack album, Star Ixiom/Original Soundtrack, was released on December 18, 1999.

== Reception ==
Reception

Review scores
Publication	Score
Famitsu	28/40
Video Games	56/100
Mega Fun	42/100
Super PLAY	6/10
Consoles Plus	72/100

Star Ixiom received a mixed reception, with many criticizing its simplicity and lack of variety in missions. German magazine Video Games labeled its presentation "extremely boring", although complimented its simplistic controls, while Mega Fun disliked its lack of variety and bland storyline, unfavorably comparing it to Colony Wars. Swedish publication Super PLAY stated that the game was too easy, only recommending it to players overwhelmed with games like Colony Wars.

In a more positive light, Next Generation highly praised its graphics and atmosphere, stating they "offer a convincing illusion of speed and scale", while also applauding its depth and innovation. They also complimented its multiple game modes and ease of access to newer players. Consoles Plus, while calling it a "less serious" game than Colony Wars, appreciated the game's presentation and originality, alongside its role-playing game elements and cinematic cutscenes.
