= Baraduke II =

1988 video game

- Japanese promotional sales flyer
- Developer: Namco
- Publisher: Namco
- Composers: Norio Nakagata; Takane Ōkubo
- Series: Baraduke
- Platform: Arcade
- Release: JP: August 1988
- Genre: Scrolling shooter
- Modes: Single-player, multiplayer
- Arcade system: Namco System 1

Baraduke II (Note: Japanese: 爆突機銃艇, Hepburn: Bakutotsu Kijūtei), also known by its short title Bakutotsu Kijūtei, is a 1988 horizontally scrolling shooter video game developed and published by Namco in for arcades. The sequel to Baraduke, which was released three years earlier, it runs on Namco System 1 hardware. The game would later be ported to the Wii Virtual Console in 2009 for Japan only. Hamster Corporation released the game outside Japan for the first time as part of their Arcade Archives series for the Nintendo Switch and PlayStation 4 in August 2023.

== Gameplay ==
Takky about to shoot an enemy

As in the original game, the players can take control of up to two players, Takky (Player 1) and Hommy (Player 2), while fighting the strange-looking Octy and saving the one-eyed Paccets. Several new enemies have also been introduced. There are now four different types of capsules; as a general rule, the yellow ones contain Paccets, while the red ones contain Baganns, the blue ones contain shot powerups, and the green ones contain speed powerups. It is also now impossible to move backwards. If the players die, they will be sent back to the beginning of the stage (unlike in the original, where they would restart in the place where they died) and be reprimanded by the "Paccet Ojisan", who also appears for the start of some stages to give advice in Japanese.

== Reception ==
Bakutotsu Kijūtei was only moderately-successful in arcades. Game Machine reports it was Japan's seventeenth most popular arcade game of September 1988. The publication noted of the game's smooth sprite animation and detailed visuals during a tradeshow demonstration, believing it would be successful in its own right.

In a 2015 retrospective review, Federico Tiraboschi of Hardcore Gaming 101 described the game as being a cross between Gradius and Section Z, with some vague resemblance to Metroid. He noted of the game's drastic change in its graphical style, being more cartoonish compared to the original Baraduke's less-muted and darker tone, as well as being more detailed and rounder in shapes. Tiraboschi was most critical of the gameplay itself, which he greatly disliked for its difficulty and bizarre structure. He criticized the lack of shields and the player starting with only one life, which he labeled as "the ultimate "screw you" to the players", saying that the game was ultimately hindered by these "ridiculous limitations", and as such was more of an obstacle course than a scrolling shooter. Tiraboschi also felt the music lacked the unsettling nature of the original. Tetsuya Inamoto of Game Watch ranked it as being one of Namco Bandai's more peculiar choices for the Virtual Console. He commented on the game's graphical overhaul and differences from the original. Ultimately, while he liked the fact that Namco Bandai decided to finally give it a home release, Inamoto considered it to be inferior to its predecessor.
