= Genpei Tōma Den =

1986 video game

- Arcade flyer
- Developer: Namco
- Publisher: Namco
- Director: Norio Nakagata
- Designer: Nobuhiko Abe
- Composer: Norio Nakagata
- Series: Genpei Tōma Den
- Platforms: Arcade, PC Engine, X68000
- Release: Arcade: JP: October 1986; X68000: JP: 1988; PC Engine: JP: March 16, 1990
- Genre: Hack and slash
- Modes: Single-player, multiplayer

Genpei Tōma Den (Note: Japanese: 源平討魔伝, Hepburn: Genpei Tōma Den; "The Genji and Heike Tale of the Demon's Demise" or "The Genpei Tale of the Demon Slayer".) is a 1986 hack and slash video game developed and published by Namco for arcades. It was released only in Japan in October 1986. Over a decade later, the game was released in America and Europe in the video game compilation Namco Museum Vol. 4 under the title of The Genji and the Heike Clans for the PlayStation.

== Gameplay ==
A screenshot taken from the second "Big Mode" level. The player (left) is fighting the game's second boss, the samurai Minamoto no Yoshitsune.

Genpei Tōma Den is a side-scrolling hack and slash platform game. The player controls Taira no Kagekiyo, a samurai who was killed in the Battle of Dan-no-ura during the Genpei War. In this alternate fictional interpretation of history, Kagekiyo was resurrected to defeat his enemy Minamoto no Yoritomo and the heads of his clan, Minamoto no Yoshitsune and Saito Musashibo Benkei, who have now thrown Japan into turmoil and turned it into a dangerous realm sprawling with demons under their tyrannical excess.

The player travels through the Japanese countryside fighting enemies as they appear. The game offers three types of action: Small Mode (standard), Big Mode (standard, but with large characters and usually boss fights) and Plain Mode (viewed from an overhead perspective). Most stages have torii, which are used to transport the player to a different stage. On most stages featured in Side Mode and Plain Mode, there are multiple torii that can be entered which will lead to different routes on the map. In Big Mode, however, there is only one torii at the end of this type of stage. The game also features the Sanzu River, a place believed in Japanese Buddhism to separate "the current life" and "the afterlife", resembling the concept of the Underworld or Hell (the river is often compared to the river Styx in Greek mythology). Therefore, some mythological characters like Emma-o (閻魔大王; literally "Enma Dai-o"), god of the Underworld, appear in the game.

== Release ==
The game's first port was released in 1988 for the Japanese X68000 home computer. The game was ported to the PC Engine and released on March 16, 1990. The PC Engine version was also released for the Wii's Virtual Console.

Genpei Tōma Den was also featured on the Namco Museum Vol. 4 compilation game for the PlayStation, released in 1996 in Japan and 1997 in North America and Europe. For the U.S. and European releases, the game was re-titled as The Genji and the Heike Clans. This would be the first time the original Genpei Tōma Den would make an appearance outside Japan. Hamster Corporation released the game as part of the Arcade Archives series for the Nintendo Switch and PlayStation 4 in October 2021

== Reception ==
Reception

Review scores
Publication	Score
Famitsu	32/40
Monthly PC Engine	90/100
Marukatsu PC Engine	33/40
PC Engine FAN	24.57/30
Tilt	5/20

Awards
Publication	Award
Famitsu	Gold Hall of Fame
Gamest	Grand Prize 6th Best Ending Award 3rd Best Speech Synthesis Award 1st Best Graphic Award 3rd

In Japan, Genpei Tōma Den received acclaim, being seen among Namco's best arcade games. The Japanese arcade trade publication Game Machine reported it as being among the best-selling arcade games in November 1986. On Japan's Gamest charts, it was the top-grossing arcade game between November and December 1986. It received multiple awards from Gamest magazine, including the sixth Grand Prize, third Best Ending, and third Best Graphic awards. The character of Kagekiyo won third place in the Best Character award. In their 1991 mook The Best Game, readers voted it as being among the greatest arcade games of all time up to that point. Staff described Genpei Tōma Den as being "an immortal masterpiece", applauding its visuals, gameplay, soundtrack, and faithfulness to its source material. Its usage of characters such as Yoshitune and Benkei, important figures in the Heian period of Japan, also received praise.

The PC Engine home release also received positive coverage. The staff of Famitsu awarded it the Gold Hall of Fame award and praised its faithfulness to the arcade original, saying that it was "a port that does not spoil the taste of the original". The magazine PC Engine FAN reported it as being among the most-popular PC Engine games, with readers voting it as being the 24th best game for the console by 1993. In contrast to other reviews, Olivier Scamps felt it was one of the worst games for the console, arguing that the game suffers from bland gameplay and uninteresting action sequences. Zenji Nishikawa of Oh!X enjoyed the X68000 version for its inclusion of new levels and secrets, finding it superior to the arcade original.

Outside Japan, Genpei Tōma Den has received a more mixed reaction from critics. In their review of Namco Museum Vol. 4, IGN stated that it was the strangest of the included games, but felt its side-scrolling gameplay appealed to fans of the genre. GameSpot's Jeff Gerstmann felt otherwise, believing it to be the worst title in any of the Namco Museum anthologies up to that point. He wrote that: "The Genji and the Heike Clans is a joke. Calling this an arcade classic is preposterous." A reviewer for PlayStation Official Magazine – UK compared it unfavorably to Sega's The Revenge of Shinobi, criticizing its controls for making the game unreasonably difficult to play and its difficulty for being too high. While the reviewer believed that Genpei Tōma Den was good as an arcade game, they didn't think it translated well to a home platform.

In 2020, Game Watch's Tetsuya Inamoto retrospectively reviewed the PC Engine version of Genpei Tōma Den through the PC Engine Mini. He applauded the conversion's quality for being on-par with the arcade game, enjoying its "overwhelming" visuals and large character sprites. Inamoto credited the game's success with its presentation and audible voice samples, which had not been done before in arcade games, alongside its usage of real-world figures such as Minamoto no Yoritomo. In addition, he believed that the quality of the port helped establish Namco's reputation for delivering accurate renditions of its arcade games to the console, writing that it "boasts the completeness of one of Namco's PC Engine arcade transplants, which had a reputation from the beginning. It delighted fans."

== Legacy ==
=== Related games ===
In October 1988, Namco released a version of Genpei Tōma Den for the Family Computer titled Genpei Tōma Den Computer Board Game. Packaged with a physical cloth game board, cards, and metallic player figures molded after Kagekiyo, it takes the form of a virtual board game where players compete against each other to conqueror all of Japan. Whereas Genpei Tōma Den was a side-scrolling action game, Computer Board Game is instead a role-playing game, where players engage in battles with enemies and purchase items and equipment from stores. The idea for the game came from Namco designer Yuichiro Shinozaki wanting to further expand on the lore and world of the original game.

A true sequel named Genpei Tōma Den: Kan no Ni was released in 1992 for the PC Engine. Developed by Namco and Now Production, it was published in North America by NEC Corporation as Samurai-Ghost. The game is set after the events of the original, where Kagekiyo is resurrected from the dead to prevent Yoritomo from reviving himself in the heaven world of Makai Nippon. Kan no Ni omits the Small and Plain mode sections, a move that was largely criticized by players and reviewers. It was re-released through the Wii's Virtual Console in 2007.

=== Other appearances in media ===
Kagekiyo has made a few appearances in other video games developed by Namco. He became a featured playable character in the WonderSwan Color game Namco Super Wars. He also appeared as a playable character in the Japan-only role-playing game Namco × Capcom, where he teamed up with Heishirō Mitsurugi from the Soul series and Tarosuke from Yokai Dochuki. In addition, Yoshitsune, Benkei, Yoshinaka and Yoritomo also appeared as bosses. In Tales of Eternia (known as Tales of Destiny II in the U.S.), he appeared in the Aifread's Tomb dungeon, along with Rick Taylor from the Splatterhouse series, to prevent the player from advancing through certain doorways. In Tales of Phantasia: Narikiri Dungeon, there is a Kagekiyo costume to be worn. Kagekiyo's armor also appears in the character creation mode of Soulcalibur III, where it is possible to create a character in his likeness. In Tekken 6, it is possible to customize the character Yoshimitsu in order to make him similar to Kagekiyo. The series was resurrected as a webcomic, as part of Namco Bandai's ShiftyLook series, titled Scar. The new webcomic featured cyborg samurais instead of demons. A remixed version of the game music was included in Ridge Racer V.

A theme based on Genpei Tōma Den, featuring several of the game's characters is featured in Pac-Man 99, as special DLC.
