= The Legend of Valkyrie =

1989 video game

- Japanese arcade flyer
- Developer: Namco
- Publisher: Namco
- Composer: Hiroyuki Kawada
- Series: Valkyrie
- Platforms: Arcade, PC Engine
- Release: Arcade: JP: April 1989; PC Engine: JP: August 9, 1990
- Genre: Action-adventure
- Modes: Single-player, multiplayer
- Arcade system: Namco System 2

The Legend of Valkyrie (Note: Japanese: ワルキューレの伝説, Hepburn: Warukyūre no Densetsu) is a 1989 action-adventure video game developed and published by Namco for arcades. It is a follow-up to the Family Computer game Valkyrie no Bōken (1986). Players control the warrior maiden Valkyrie and her lizard-like companion Kurino Xandra as they set out to drop a mythical item called the Golden Seed into the Northern Fountain to replenish the dying crop fields of Xandra Land. Gameplay involves defeating enemies and collecting gold to purchase magical spells and weapons in shops.

The Legend of Valkyrie was the creation of Namco artist Hiroshi Fujii and a designer only known by the pseudonym of "Koakuman". The game's world, the fictional kingdom of Marvel Land, was greatly inspired by Viking tales from northern Europe and the Middle Ages, with a heavy emphasis on having a sort-of "magical" feel of it. It was originally meant to be a four-player action game in the vein of titles like Gauntlet with a cabinet-linking system similar to Final Lap, which was scrapped later on. Characters were made to have personality and depth, a design choice inspired by The Wizard of Oz.

The Legend of Valkyrie was released in arcades to critical acclaim for its gameplay, characters, and world. Namco ported the game to the PC Engine in 1990, a conversion that was met with a more mixed response for its difficulty, downgraded graphics, and altered gameplay. The game was mostly unknown outside Japan until the release of Namco Museum Vol. 5 in 1997, which was fully translated into English. Several additional ports were made, including those for Windows, Japanese mobile phones, and the Wii's Virtual Console.

== Gameplay ==
Arcade version screenshot

The Legend of Valkyrie is a top-down action-adventure game. The player takes control of the sword-armed warrior maiden Valkyrie, while a second player can join in as Valkyrie's lizard-like companion Kurino Xandra. Both characters have a projectile weapon that can be shot at enemies to defeat them, as well as health meters that deplete if they are hit by an enemy or projectile. A fraction of their health will also be removed if either fall into a pit or off a cliff. A time limit is present, indicated by an hourglass towards the bottom of the screen, which will deplete as the stage progresses – allowing this timer to fully empty will result in the game being over.

Both players can collect gold coins by defeating enemies, which can be used in stores found throughout the game to purchase magic spells, weapons and other items. Some enemies can drop bubble-like items that can be exchanged with certain NPCs in return for powerful magic spells that can deal great damage against enemies. Item prices in shops increase as the game progresses. Players can find treasure chests in certain places that yield powerful, sometimes rare items that are useful for later sections of the game. The game spans a total of eight areas, featuring locations such as grassy plateaus, icefields, caves and dungeons. Each area concludes with a boss that must be defeated to progress. The final area features a showdown the game's antagonist Kamooz.

== Plot ==
Small parts of the story to The Legend of Valkyrie are told through in-game cutscenes and dialogue, while much of it is instead found in various pieces of Namco promotional material. Continuing after the events of the first game, following the restoration of peace to the kingdom of Marvel Land the inhabitants of Xandra Land notice their kingdom becoming barren of resources, with the cropfields providing the Xandra Land people's food drying up. In an effort to save his family and home, Kurino Xandra embarks on a quest to retrieve a mystical item called the Golden Seed, said to grant the wishes of whoever drops it into the Northern Spring. After beginning his search for the Golden Seed, Xandra is joined by Sabina, a member of the Koakuman tribe, (Note: The name "Koakuman" is based on the Japanese word "koaku", meaning "little devil". North American versions of the game mistranslate this as "Quarkman".) and Zuul, a former bandit who has a map potentially leading to the seed. Following the map leads the trio to an odd formation of rocks with a golden trident atop them, which becomes Xandra's primary weapon.

One evening, the three encounter an old woman in the forest, advising them to visit an abandoned village that had been destroyed many years ago. As they investigate, Xandra and company are met by the warlord Kamooz and his group of soldiers. Kamooz, responsible for spreading destruction and chaos across Marvel Land, is also looking for the Golden Seed to enslave the inhabitants of the kingdom and make them his personal slaves, attacking Xandra and his friends. Just as the situation begins to escalate, a mythical warrior named Valkyrie descends from the heavens and chases away Kamooz and his soldiers. Valkyrie agrees to join Xandra, Sabina and Zuul to put an end to Kamooz and retrieve the Golden Seed. After making their way to the Northern Spring, Valkyrie and Xandra encounter Kamooz once more and manage to defeat him before he drops the Golden Seed into the spring; with her mission fulfilled, Valkyrie bids farewell to Xandra and his friends as she leaps back into the heavens.

== Development ==
Early concept art. The Legend of Valkyrie was intended as a four-player arcade game early on, featuring multiple Valkyrie characters.

The Legend of Valkyrie was conceptualized by Namco character artist Hiroshi Fujii, who previously worked on the game's predecessor Valkyrie no Bōken: Toki no Kagi Densetsu, and a designer only known by the pseudonym of "Koakuman". Prior to designing Densetsu, Fujii had previously worked for Namco's design department, a division of the company that produced toys, electro-mechanical arcade games, and robotics. When the department was eventually dissolved, Fujii was swiftly brought aboard Namco's core video game design division due to his prior experience with console games, and became the head designer for the new game. During the project's planning stage, Fujii used many of his sketches and artwork he created for Valkyrie no Boken to rework into Densetsu, including several enemies and locations. The game's fictional world was inspired by the Middle Ages and ancient Europe, featuring a sense of "magic" in-between. The team envisioned the player exploring a vast, open-world, with transitioning seasons and landscapes, but the vertical orientation of the arcade monitor left much of this idea heavily altered or cut out entirely.

Koakuman designed the game's protagonists and enemies, being heavily inspired by The Wizard of Oz. Characters were given personalities to make them "colorful" and have depth, with enemies given a sort-of humanity factor so that they wouldn't simply be hated by players. Koakuman also assisted in shaping the game's world, much of which paid homage to Viking tales from northern Europe. The character of Valkyrie was made to have a strong sense of justice, and to be uncompromising and strong-willed – Koakuman describes a female protagonist as "taboo" during the time of production. The Xandra race, originally enemies in Boken, were reformed to be allies of Valkyrie and the player in Densetsu. The development team originally planned to make a game a 4-player game in the vein of Gauntlet with a linkable cabinet-like feature similar to Namco's own Final Lap series, alongside multiple controllable Valkyries, both of which were abandoned later on.

== Release ==
The Legend of Valkyrie was released in Japan by Namco in April 1989, running on the Namco System 2 arcade hardware. A PC Engine home conversion was released on August 9, 1990. This version features a number of alternations and additions to the game, including new stages, a different stage order, a password system, and an alternate ending sequence. It was one of the five games included in the PlayStation compilation disk Namco Museum Vol. 5, alongside other Namco games such as Pac-Mania and Metro-Cross. It was fully translated as it is the first time the game was released outside Japan. Japanese game publisher MediaKite released a Windows version of the game on June 11, 1999, as part of their Super 1500 Series budget title lineup; Namco later included this version in the compilation disk Namco Collection Vol. 1, alongside Sky Kid Deluxe and Final Lap. Two mobile phone versions were released in Japan – the first of these was for i-Mode devices in 2005, and the other for EZweb in 2006. The PC Engine conversion was digitally re-released for the Japanese Wii Virtual Console in 2008, followed by the arcade version in 2009. The PC Engine version is also one of the 50 built-in games included in the TurboGrafx-16 Mini dedicated console by Konami.

== Reception ==
Reception

Review scores
Publication	Score
Aktueller Software Markt	7/12
Famitsu	7/10, 7/10, 8/10, 5/10
Gekkan PC Engine	90/100, 95/100, 75/100, 90/100, 90/100
Jeuxvideo.com	14/20
Power Play	47/100
PC Engine Fan	24/30

Award
Publication	Award
Gamest	The Best Game 1st Player Popularity 7th Best Action Award 2nd The Best Game of All Time (1st)

The Legend of Valkyrie was critically acclaimed in its initial release by players and critics, and was widely successful. Japanese publication Gamest awarded the game the first-place "The Best Game" award in 1991 and listed it as one of the best arcade games of all time, simultaneously awarding it the 7th "Player Popularity" and 2nd "Best Action" awards. Gamest said that the unique characters, addictive role-playing-like gameplay and overall presentation made The Legend of Valkyrie one of Namco's best arcade titles, greatly applauding the game's strong usage of the System 2 hardware and for providing an experience unmatched by most arcade titles at the time. They also claimed it was a significant improvement over its Famicom predecessor, and labeled it as being influential for the genre. In a 1991 Gamest reader poll, The Legend of Valkyrie was voted the best arcade game of all time.

The PC Engine conversion was met with a more mixed reaction by contrast. Several critics agreed that the gameplay was fun and offered variety, but was too difficult and lacked replay value. German publications ASM and Power Play both found the gameplay to be entertaining yet overly simplistic, with Power Play adding that its short play time made it difficult going back to, in contrast to similar games for the PC Engine that offered much longer gameplay experiences. Japanese magazines PC Engine FAN and Maru PC Engine liked the gameplay for being fun and energetic, although PC Engine FAN argued that it was too difficult to appeal to newer players. ASM in contrast stated that the game was welcoming to newer players, appreciating that it became gradually difficult as it progresses. Several publications liked the graphics; ASM called them "sweet" and colorful, while Maru PC Engine liked them for being bright and detailed. PC Engine FAN said the graphics were good but not as "impressive" as the arcade original. While Maru PC Engine liked the game's storyline and fictional world, Power Play disagreed, finding both of them lackluster and feeling like the story was simply a tacked-on extra. Reviewing the Wii Virtual Console port of the PC Engine version, Rroyd-Y of Jeuxvideo argued the shift from the traditional RPG format of Boken to the more hack'n slash gameplay of Densetsu was somewhat "inappropriate", disliking its storyline and jumping physics. He liked the game's graphics for being colorful, the music for being catchy, and the gameplay itself for being fun and entertaining. In their review of Namco Museum Vol. 5, IGN said that the cartoony artstyle and scaling effects made The Legend of Valkyrie the stand-out game of the compilation.

In a 2015 retrospective review, Kurt Kalata of Hardcore Gaming 101 labeled the game as a classic. Comparing the game favorably to Wonder Boy in Monster Land with its similar action-adventure gameplay, he greatly applauded the game's two-player mode, graphics and soundtrack, alongside its well-designed mechanics and storyline. Kalata stated that the game's usage of puzzle-solving and adventure elements made it stand out from other games, alongside its "impressive" graphical effects such as sprite scaling and rotation. Kalata concluded his review by expressing disappointment that Namco chose not to widely localize the game outside Japan, instead choosing to export rushed translations of titles such as the Tekken series.
