= Star Luster =

1985 video game

- Japanese Famicom box art
- Developer: Namco
- Publisher: Namco
- Designer: Shigeki Toyama
- Composer: Hiroyuki Kawada
- Platforms: Family Computer, Arcade, X68000, mobile phone
- Release: JP: December 6, 1985
- Genre: Space combat simulator
- Mode: Single-player
- Arcade system: Nintendo VS. System

Star Luster (Note: Japanese: スターラスター, Hepburn: Sutā Rasutā) is a 1985 space combat simulator video game developed and published by Namco for the Family Computer. It was only released in Japan. An arcade version for the Nintendo VS. System was released the same year as VS. Star Luster. Star Luster is set in the same universe as Namco's Bosconian (1981), and the gameplay has strong similarities to Atari, Inc.'s Star Raiders from 1979.

An enhanced version of Star Luster was published for the X68000 in August 1994. A sequel, Star Ixiom, was released for the PlayStation in 1999.

Star Luster was initially met with mixed reviews and poor sales. The game's reliance on obtuse level objectives and random enemy encounters have been blamed for its lack of popularity, in addition to the Famicom's userbase being primarily children that didn't understand its design. Retrospectively, Star Luster has received more positive reviews for its 3D perspective and presentation.

== Gameplay ==
Looking out from the ship's cockpit at an enemy.

Star Luster involves moving through open space via a first-person cockpit view and engaging enemy ships. The player's ship has limited fuel and can be refueled at bases. A map and radar show locations of enemies and bases. The player can choose a location on the map and warp to it, with the current date changing based on the warp distance.

== Reception ==
Reception

Review score
Publication	Score
Family Computer Magazine	16.98/20

Star Luster initially received mixed reviews and struggled to gain sales. The game's lack of popularity has been blamed on its complex design, which relies heavily on random encounters and obtuse level objectives that, at the time, were seen as too confusing and esoteric for a console game. Critics also believed producing the game for the Famicom, a game console targeted primarily towards children, was a factor in Star Luster's poor commercial reception. A reviewer for Family Computer Magazine highlighted the game's usage of a radar and 3D perspective. They believed the radar was difficult to understand at first, but over time the player would become used to it.

Retrospective reviews of Star Luster have labeled it a masterpiece. Yuge believed the first-person viewpoint was impressive for the time, and highlighted the game's sense of tension and Star Wars-esque presentation. The magazine believes the game's first-person perspective was what led to the game's initial mixed reception, as it was considered too advanced for the time. Continue writer Zenji Ishii considers Star Luster important and influential for the space combat simulator genre, with a high level of action and strategy.

== Legacy ==
In 1998, the game was included on a compilation made for the PlayStation known as Namco Anthology 1 where, like all of the Famicom games presented on the disc, an enhanced arrange mode was provided alongside the unaltered original game. Nintendo included the Famicom version in the Japanese version of Namco-developed Star Fox Assault. It was released for the Wii's Virtual Console in Japan on March 4, 2008. The arcade version was released by Hamster Corporation as part of their Arcade Archives series for the Nintendo Switch and PlayStation 4 in June 2024.

A sequel, Star Ixiom, was released for the PlayStation in 1999 for Japan and Europe. The game is similar to that of its predecessor and adds seven selectable ships: the Gaia Σ, Spartacus, Tycoon, Ogre-Header, Dragoon J2 (connected to Dragoon, from Galaxian 3), the GeoSword from Starblade, and the Galaxip from Galaxian.

The game was a significant inspiration for director Katsuya Eguchi when he was working on Star Fox 2. Castlevania series producer Koji Igarashi has listed Star Luster as his second-favorite NES game.
