= Wonder Momo =

1987 video game

- Japanese arcade flyer
- Developer: Namco
- Publisher: Namco
- Composer: Kimio Yudate
- Series: Wonder Momo
- Platforms: Arcade, PC Engine, mobile phone
- Release: Arcade: JP: February 24, 1987; PC Engine: JP: April 21, 1989; Mobile: JP: June 2005
- Genre: Beat'em up
- Modes: Single-player, multiplayer

Wonder Momo (Note: Japanese: ワンダーモモ, Hepburn: Wandā Momo) is a 1987 beat 'em up video game developed and published by Namco for arcades. It was released only in Japan on February 24, 1987. It was ported to the PC Engine in 1989, with both versions of the game later ported to the Wii Virtual Console, and ported to Nintendo Switch and PlayStation 4 as part of Arcade Archives series. The game was also included in Namco Museum Encore for the PlayStation. Wonder Momo inspired a webcomic series in 2012, an anime miniseries in 2014, and a sequel game by WayForward Technologies in May 2014.

== Gameplay ==
Screenshot of Wonder Momo (arcade version)

Wonder Momo is a loose parody of a typical Ultraman-style superhero series, and utilizing a then-rare female protagonist. When the game is first started, players are treated to a parody of the MGM logo featuring Momo instead of a lion and a "Modoki" instead of a mask. The game then cuts to a scene of a theater stage, where a play begins starring Momo, a young woman who gets super-powers. At this point the game puts the player in command of Momo. Rather than playing a hero who needs to save the world, the setting is that of a live stage show (set at the "Namco Theater"), and the player is actually controlling an actress who is merely playing the role of Momo/Wonder Momo. The game also features voice samples in Japanese.

As Momo, she can only attack using kicks, and in doing so builds up her "Wonder" meter. When she touches a tornado icon, or spins around by herself, she can turn into Wonder Momo and can also attack using the Wonder Hoop, which can be reused as long as she is Wonder Momo. After the Wonder Hoop is thrown, she will not be able to throw anymore, while she will have to wait for it to bounce back to her. She can also shoot small waves of energy in whichever direction she faces (while she is crouching), which is based on the similar move by the Ultraman characters. Her most powerful attack is the Wonder Typhoon, a more powerful version of her small energy wave attack which shoots numerous small energy waves towards the left and right sides of the screen simultaneously, while she is spinning.

The game is notable for featuring some slightly risqué content for the time, in the form of fan service (at Momo's expense). When Momo jumps, the player can visibly see her underwear. Momo also needs to be wary of photographers in the theatre audience, who are determined to get a peek under her miniskirt. If one is successful, Momo will be "embarrassed" (stunned) for a short period of time. Additionally, one of the images that appears on the theater curtain (at the beginning and end of some acts) is Momo wearing only a towel.

== Ports and related releases ==
The game was ported to the PC Engine by NEC Avenue in 1989. Both the PC Engine and arcade versions was released on the Wii's Virtual Console respectively in 2007 and 2009. Hamster Corporation released the game as part of their Arcade Archives series for the Nintendo Switch and PlayStation 4 in March 2022.

The titular character made numerous appearances outside of her video game, mostly in Namco's other video games. Wonder Momo appeared as one of the playable characters in the Japan-only, tactical RPG title Namco x Capcom, partnering with Bravoman, while Amazona appeared as an enemy character. Momo often covered herself, alluding to the original game. Some artifacts, models and costumes based on Wonder Momo appeared in some other Namco titles. She appeared as a magnus card in the Namco RPG Baten Kaitos: Eternal Wings and the Lost Ocean, made a cameo appearance as one of Anise's dolls in Tales of the Abyss, had her normal self appear as one of the various floats that appear in the bonus stages of Marvel Land, and had her "Wonder" costume appear in Tales of the World: Radiant Mythology 2 and in Catalogue 4 in the Xbox 360 game The Idolmaster. Her latest appearance lies in the PSP strategy RPG Queen's Gate: Spiral Chaos. A theme based on Wonder Momo, with the game's characters is featured in Pac-Man 99, as special DLC.

== In other media ==
Wonder Momo received a brief adaptation as part of the manga anthology Famitsu Comix: The Shape of Happiness (しあわせのかたち, Shiawase no katachi), published in the Famitsu Comics collection from March 1989, drawn by Tamakichi Sakura.

Besides appearing in video games, J-pop singer Haruko Momoi released an album influenced by the video game fully titled as WONDER MOMO-i〜New recording〜 (a pun combining her last name with the name of this game). It utilizes both the game's main gameplay theme and the "henshin" (transformation) theme. Yujin released a gashapon figure of Momo as part of the "Namco Girls" collection.

=== ShiftyLook comic ===
Wonder Momo was resurrected as an internet comic strip on Namco Bandai's comic strip website ShiftyLook with the title Wonder Momo: Battle Idol in March 2012. The series, illustrated by Omar Dogan and written by Erik Ko and Jim Zub, is set 25 years after the original game and focuses on Momoko, an idol who, after failing a TV show audition, encounters a race of aliens who give her Wonder Momo's powers. Learning to harness them, she begins battling evil aliens as well as rival hero Amazona, who is actually a popular idol named Akiho Mazo who was inspired by the original Wonder Momo, later revealed to be Momoko's mother. Wonder Momo also made several appearances in Shiftylook's concurrent Bravoman webcomic and webseries, voiced by Romi Dames in the latter. The comic concluded with its 200th page in March 2014, following the announcement of ShiftyLook's closure.

=== Anime ===
Wonder Momo, an anime miniseries, is based on the story from the 2012 ShiftyLook webcomic. The series was produced by Graphinica and spanned five-seven minute episodes, which were released weekly on streaming sites Niconico and Crunchyroll beginning on February 6, 2014. The voice cast includes Yuka Fujiwara as Momoko, Misaki Komatsu as Akiho, and Haruko Momoi reprising the role of the original Wonder Momo.

A side-scrolling action game developed by WayForward Technologies and produced by ShiftyLook, titled Wonder Momo: Typhoon Booster, was released for Android devices and Macintosh in 2014, with a PC version planned for a later date. Following ShiftyLook's closure, the PC version was cancelled, and the Macintosh and Android versions were delisted in 2015.

== Reception ==
Reception

Review scores
| Publication | Score |
|---|---|
| Famitsu | 21/40 |
| The Games Machine | 54% |

In Japan, Game Machine listed Wonder Momo on their April 1, 1987 issue as being the fourth most-successful table arcade unit of the month.

Reviewing the PC Engine home conversion, German publication Aktueller Software Markt (ASM) liked the game's large sprites, soundtrack and special effects, alongside its simple and easy-to-understand gameplay. The Games Machine magazine found it to be "great fun" for its bizarre premise, gameplay and visuals, while Famitsu praised its large, detailed sprites and catchy soundtrack. Famitsu also praised the PC Engine version for being a faithful conversion of the arcade release.
