= Baraduke =

1985 video game

- Arcade flyer
- Developer: Namco
- Publisher: Namco
- Designer: Yukio Takahashi
- Series: Baraduke
- Platforms: Arcade, X68000
- Release: Arcade: JP: May 1985; EU: October 1985; NA: 1985; X68000: JP: 1995
- Genre: Run and gun
- Modes: Single-player, multiplayer
- Arcade system: Namco Pac-Land

Baraduke, (Note: Japanese: バラデューク, Hepburn: Baradyūku) released as Alien Sector in North America, is a 1985 run and gun video game developed and published by Namco for arcades. A home version was published for the X68000 in 1995.

== Gameplay ==
Arcade screenshot

The player takes control of a spacewoman in a biohazard suit. Player 1 is Kissy and Player 2 is Takky. They must clear eight worlds of increasing difficulty (each one is composed of five regular floors and one boss floor) by using their wave guns to destroy all the enemies populating them. They must also save the one-eyed Paccets for extra points and the chance to earn another shield in the end-of-floor bonus games.

On each floor there are a certain number of enemies known as Octy, which will leave power-up capsules behind when defeated. Defeating all the Octy on the current floor will open up a pipe at the bottom of the floor, and the player will have to find and enter it in order to proceed to the next one. The boss floors feature a giant enemy (a Blue Worm in Worlds 1, 3, 5 and 7, a Turning Eye in Worlds 2, 4 and 6, and the Octy King himself in World 8) who must be killed in order to proceed to the next world.

== Reception ==
In Japan, Game Machine listed Baraduke on their September 1, 1985 issue as being the fifteenth most-successful table arcade unit of the month.

Clare Edgeley of Computer and Video Games reviewed the arcade game in October 1985. She said there was "not much in the way of graphics [or] story line", but "there's plenty of blasting material." She called it a "reasonably fast, mildly addictive" game, but said it "hasn't got the qualities to take it into the top ten arcade games."

In a 2016 retrospective, Federico Tiraboschi of Hardcore Gaming 101 compared the game to Nintendo's Metroid (1986), noting that Baraduke anticipated several elements of Metroid. He said "in both you play as a faceless space soldier in a bright-colored suit who travels inside a sprawling complex of caves full of weird alien creatures" and both later reveal the player character to be female. However, he said Baraduke "focuses more on the shooting than the exploration, which is there, but to a minimal extent" compared to Metroid. He also compared Baraduke to Capcom's Section Z (1985), released later the same year, noting that in "both games the players control a free-range spaceman with a jetpack traversing a number of sectors scrolling both horizontally and vertically," but "in Baraduke the player characters are affected by gravity and their gun's recoil."

== Legacy ==
In 1995, ten years after its original arcade release, it was ported to the X68000, and was also included in the fifth volume of the Namco Museum series on the PlayStation. It was re-released on Namco Museum Virtual Arcade on the Xbox 360 in 2008, the Wii's Virtual Console in 2009 as well as by Hamster Corporation through their Arcade Archives series for the Nintendo Switch and PlayStation 4 in November 2022.

A sequel titled Baraduke II was released in 1988 only in Japan.

Baraduke is noted as an early example of a female game protagonist, with her gender being revealed in a "twist" ending. Although the game's primary protagonist, Toby "Kissy" Masuyo, is a woman, the player is led to believe she is a man until her face is revealed in the ending. This predated by one year Samus Aran from Metroid as a human female playable character. The game has been further compared to Metroid for its similarities, as both games feature a maze filled with alien enemies, and a "surprise" reveal of their female protagonists at the end.

In the Mr. Driller series of games, Kissy Masuyo is a supporting character under the name Toby Masuyo (they refer to "Kissy" as being her nickname). She has married and divorced Taizo Hori (better known as Dig Dug, the protagonist of the 1982 arcade game of the same name) and they have three children, Susumu Hori (who is the main character of Mr. Driller), Ataru Hori, and Taiyo Toby. Kissy is also a playable character in the Japan-only tactical role-playing video game Namco x Capcom, where she is teamed up with Hiromi Tengenji from Burning Force. Due to her divorce, she seems to have a grudge against Taizo Hori, who also appears in this game (a reference to the Mr. Driller series). Tron Bonne, from Capcom's Mega Man Legends game, mistakes her for a boy.

A Paccet (which is a small, round yellow alien with only one eye) appears in the background as a painting in Tales of Destiny. Elle Mel Marta's backpack in Tales of Xillia 2 is also a Paccet, with a small charm shaped like Kissy attached to it. Paccet makes a cameo in Super Smash Bros. for Nintendo 3DS and Wii U as part of Pac-Man's taunt, "Namco Roulette".
