= Dig Dug =

1982 video game

- North American arcade flyer
- Developer: Namco
- Publishers: JP/EU: Namco; NA: Atari, Inc.
- Designers: Masahisa Ikegami; Shigeru Yokoyama
- Programmers: Shouichi Fukatani; Toshio Sakai
- Artist: Hiroshi Ono
- Composer: Yuriko Keino
- Series: Dig Dug
- Platform: Arcade: Sord M5, Atari 2600, Atari 5200, TI-99/4A, PC-6000, PV-1000, Sharp X1, VIC-20, Atari 8-bit, Apple II, Commodore 64, IBM PC, PC-88, FM-7, MSX, MZ-1500, Famicom, Atari 7800, Intellivision, Famicom Disk System, Game Boy, X68000, Game Boy Advance, mobile phone
- Release: February 20, 1982: Arcade; JP: February 20, 1982; EU: April 19, 1982; NA: April 1982 2600, 5200; October 1983 TI-99/4A; December 1983 PC-6000, PV-1000; JP: 1983 Atari 8-bit, Apple II, C64, IBM PC; December 1984 FM-7, MSX; JP: 1984 Famicom; JP: June 4, 1985 7800; May 15, 1986 Intellivision; July 1987 Famicom Disk System; JP: July 20, 1990 Game Boy; NA: September 1992; EU: 1992 X68000; JP: February 24, 1995 Game Boy Advance; JP: June 21, 2004
- Genres: Action, Maze
- Modes: Single-player, multiplayer
- Arcade system: Namco Galaga

Dig Dug (Note: Japanese: ディグダグ, Hepburn: Digu Dagu) is a 1982 maze video game developed and published by Namco for arcades. It was released by Atari, Inc. in North America. The player digs underground tunnels in each level to escape and attack enemy characters, by either inflating them to bursting or crushing them underneath rocks.

Dig Dug was planned and designed by Masahisa Ikegami with help from Galaga creator Shigeru Yokoyama. It was programmed for the Namco Galaga arcade board by Shouichi Fukatani, who worked on many of Namco's earlier arcade games, along with Toshio Sakai. Music was composed by Yuriko Keino, including the character movement jingle at executives' request, as her first Namco game. Namco heavily marketed it as a "strategic digging game".

Upon release, Dig Dug was well received by critics for its engaging gameplay and kawaii character design. During the golden age of arcade video games, it was globally successful, including as the second highest-grossing arcade game of 1982 in Japan. It prompted a long series of sequels and spin-offs, including the Mr. Driller series, for several platforms. It is in many Namco video game compilations for many systems.

== Gameplay ==
Arcade version screenshot

Dig Dug is a maze video game where the player controls the titular protagonist, Dig Dug (Taizo Hori), to eliminate each stage's enemies: Pookas, red and spherical beings that wear comically large goggles; and the draconic Fygars, which breathe fire. Dig Dug can use an air pump to inflate them until they explode or crush them to death under falling rocks. When the air pump is activated, Dig Dug will stop moving and throw the end of the air pump forwards, where it may catch onto an enemy. If an enemy is hit, they are frozen in place and the player can repeatedly press the air pump's button to inflate them. If no action is taken for a while or the player moves, the air pump disconnects and the action is cancelled, but the enemy will begin to deflate and will be stunned until fully deflated. Rocks are unable to be dug through but will fall after a short period of time after the tile directly beneath them is removed by Dig Dug and he moves from the position, though he can still be crushed. Falling rocks are destroyed once they land on a tile. Bonus points are awarded for squashing multiple enemies with a single rock and dropping any pair of rocks in a stage yields a bonus item, which can be eaten for points, and increases its point value the further the player gets in the game. Once all the enemies have been defeated, Dig Dug progresses to the next stage.

Enemies can move through tiles, where they are represented in the form of ghostly eyes, and are invulnerable, slowed and unable to attack, and will then return to being solid once in an empty space, whether that space is their destination or is along the way. The enemies can either do this to reach Dig Dug when they would otherwise be unable to or to escape from the stage as the last enemy. As enemies are defeated, the enemies eventually become faster and more aggressive, until the last one then attempts to escape on either side of the screen at the top of the stage. To escape, enemies will move straight up through any tiles before walking towards the nearest screen edge on the surface. If Dig Dug is killed and he's caught by either Pooka or Fygar, burned by Fygar's fire, or crushed by a rock, he loses a life; the game ends when all lives are lost.

The game has 255 stages. Later stages vary in dirt color, while increasing the number and speed of enemies. Lives are lost upon touching a foe, Fygar's fire or getting squished by a falling rock, but players are given extra lives during the game. At round 256, the game experiences an 8-bit integer overflow bug and attempts to instead load round 0. Doing so causes level generation to misbehave, and the game spawns a Pooka inescapably on top of Dig Dug, draining the player of all their lives and ultimately ending the run. This kill screen is the ending of Dig Dug in most versions of the game, but a later Atari release patched this bug and instead allows infinite play.

== Development ==
Dig Dug was planned and designed in 1981 by Masahisa Ikegami, with help from Shigeru Yokoyama, creator of Galaga. The game was programmed for the Namco Galaga arcade system board by Shigeichi Ishimura, a Namco hardware engineer, and the late Shouichi Fukatani, along with Toshio Sakai. Other staff members were primarily colleagues of Shigeru Yokoyama. Yuriko Keino composed the soundtrack, as her first video game project. Tasked with making Dig Dug's movement sound, she could not make a realistic stepping sound, so she instead made a short melody. Hiroshi "Mr. Dotman" Ono, a Namco graphic artist, designed the sprites.

The team hoped to allow player-designed mazes which could prompt unique gameplay mechanics, contrasting with the pre-set maze exploration in Pac-Man (1980). Namco's marketing materials prominently referred to Dig Dug as a "strategic digging game".

== Release ==
Dig Dug was released in Japan by Namco on February 20, 1982, followed by North America in April by Atari, Inc., and in Europe on April 19 by Namco.

The first home versions of Dig Dug were developed and published by Atari for its Atari 2600 and Atari 5200 consoles and released in October 1983. Further versions were released for the TI-99/4A (December 1983), Atari 8-bit computers, Commodore 64, IBM PC and Apple II (December 1984). A version for the Atari 7800 was announced in 1984, but was delayed along with the console itself due to changes in Atari management; it would eventually be released by Atari Corporation on May 15, 1986. A similar port for the Intellivision was also delayed before being released in July 1987.

In Japan, it was released for the PV-1000 in 1983, the MSX in 1984, and the Famicom on June 4, 1985. Gakken released a handheld LCD tabletop game in 1983, which replaced Dig Dug's air pump with a flamethrower to accommodate hardware limitations. A version for the Famicom Disk System, based on the 1985 Famicom version of the game, was released on July 20, 1990. Namco released a Game Boy version in North America and Europe in September 1992, with a new game mode called "New Dig Dug", in which the player must collect keys to open an exit door. The Game Boy version was later included in the 1996 Japan-only compilation Namco Gallery Vol. 2, which also includes Galaxian, The Tower of Druaga, and Famista 4. A Japanese X68000 version was developed by Dempa and released on February 24, 1995, bundled with Dig Dug II. On June 21, 2004, the Famicom version was re-released in Japan for the Game Boy Advance as part of the Famicom Mini series.

Dig Dug is a mainstay in Namco video game compilations, including Namco Museum Vol. 3 (1996), Namco History Vol. 3 (1998), Namco Museum 64 (1999), Namco Museum 50th Anniversary (2005), Namco Museum Remix (2007), Namco Museum Essentials (2009), and Namco Museum Switch (2017). The game was released online on Xbox Live Arcade in 2006, with support online leaderboards and achievements. It is part of Namco Museum Virtual Arcade, and was added to the Xbox One's backward compatibility lineup in 2016. A version for the Wii's Virtual Console was released in 2009 in Japan. Dig Dug is a bonus game in Pac-Man Party, alongside the arcade versions of Pac-Man and Galaga. The arcade version was also re-released digitally for the PlayStation 4 and Nintendo Switch as part of the Arcade Archives series and published by Hamster Corporation in 2022.

== Reception ==
Reception

Review scores
Publication	Score
AllGame	5/5 (Arcade); 4/5 (NES)
Eurogamer	8/10 (Arcade); 6/10 (XBLA)
GameSpot	6/10 (XBLA)
IGN	7/10 (XBLA)
Computer Games	A (Atari 5200)
Electronic Fun with Computers & Games	3.5/4 (Atari 8-bit)

Dig Dug was a critical and commercial success upon release, and was praised for its gameplay and layered strategy. In Japan, it was the second highest-grossing arcade game of 1982, behind Namco's own Pole Position. In North America, Atari sold 22,228 Dig Dug arcade cabinets by the end of 1982, earning $46,300,000 (equivalent to $154,000,000 in 2025) in sales. Around July 1983, it was one of the six top-grossing games. The 2004 Famicom Mini release had 58,572 copies sold, and the Xbox Live Arcade version had 222,240 copies by 2011.

American publication Blip Magazine favorably compared it to games such as Pac-Man for its simple controls and fun gameplay. AllGame called it "an arcade and NES classic", praising its characters, gameplay, and unique premise, and for its easy home platform conversion. In 1998, Japanese magazine Gamest called it one of the greatest arcade games of all time for its addictiveness and for breaking the traditional "dot-eater" gameplay used in games such as Pac-Man and Rally-X. In a 2007 retrospective, Eurogamer praised its "perfect" gameplay and strategy, saying it is one of "the most memorable and legendary videogame releases of the past 30 years". The Killer List of Videogames rated it the sixth-most-popular coin-op game of all time.

Electronic Fun with Computers & Games praised the Atari 8-bit version for retaining the arcade's entertaining gameplay and for its simple controls.

Some home versions were criticized for quality and lack of exclusive content. Readers of Softline magazine ranked Dig Dug the tenth-worst Apple II and fourth-worst Atari 8-bit video game of 1983 for its subpar quality and failure of consumer expectations.

Reviewing the Xbox Live Arcade digital re-release, IGN liked its presentation, leaderboards, and addictive gameplay, recommending it for old and new fans alike. A similar response was echoed by GameSpot for its colorful artwork and faithful arcade gameplay, and by Eurogamer for addictiveness and longevity. Eurogamer, IGN, and GameSpot all criticized its lack of online multiplayer and for achievements being too easy to unlock, with Eurogamer in particular criticizing the game's controls for sometimes being unresponsive.

== Legacy ==
Dig Dug prompted a fad of "digging games". Clones include the arcade game Zig Zag (1982), the Atari 8-bit computer game Anteater (1982) by Romox, Merlin's Pixie Pete, Victory's Cave Kooks (1983) for the Commodore 64, and Saguaro's Pumpman (1984) for the TRS-80 Color Computer. The most successful is Universal Entertainment's arcade game Mr. Do! (1982), released about six months later and surpassing clone status. Sega's Borderline (1981), when it was ported to the Atari 2600 as Thunderground in 1983, was mistaken as a "semi-clone" of Dig Dug and Mr. Do! Boulder Dash (1984) also drew comparisons to Dig Dug. Numerous mobile games are clones or variations of Dig Dug, such as Diggerman, Dig Deep, Digby Forever, Dig Out, Puzzle to the Center of Earth, Mine Blitz, I Dig It, Doug Dug, Minesweeper, Dig a Way, and Dig Dog.

=== Sequels ===
Dig Dug prompted a long series of sequels for several platforms. The first of these, Dig Dug II, was released in Japan in 1985 to less success, opting for an overhead perspective; instead of digging through earth, Dig Dug drills along fault lines to sink pieces of an island into the ocean. A second sequel, Dig Dug Arrangement, was released for arcades in 1996 as part of the Namco Classic Collection Vol. 2 arcade collection, with new enemies, music, power-ups, boss fights, and two-player co-operative play.

A 3D remake of the original, Dig Dug Deeper, was published by Infogrames in 2001 for Windows. A Nintendo DS sequel, Dig Dug: Digging Strike, was released in 2005, combining elements from the first two games and adding a narrative link to the Mr. Driller series. A massively-multiplayer online game, Dig Dug Island, was released in 2008, and was an online version of Dig Dug II; servers lasted for less than a year, discontinued on April 21, 2009.

=== Related media ===
Two Dig Dug-themed slot machines were produced by Japanese company Oizumi in 2003, both with small LCD monitors for animated characters. A webcomic adaptation was produced in 2012 by ShiftyLook, a subsidiary of Bandai Namco focused on reviving older Namco franchises, with nearly 200 issues by several different artists, concluding in 2014 following the closure of ShiftyLook. Dig Dug is a main character in the ShiftyLook webseries Mappy: The Beat. A remix of the Dig Dug soundtrack appears in the PlayStation 2 game Technic Beat. An interactive animated short based on Dig Dug was produced in 2025 by Gamisodes in association with Bandai Namco, which is planned to stream through June 17, 2025 to June 30, 2025, on the Gameisodes platform.

The character Dig Dug was renamed to Taizo Hori, a play on the Japanese phrase "horitai zo", meaning "I want to dig". He became a prominent character in Namco's own Mr. Driller series, where he is revealed to be the father of Susumu Hori and being married to Baraduke protagonist Masuyo Tobi, who would divorce for unknown reasons. Taizo appears as a playable character in Namco Super Wars for the WonderSwan Color and Namco × Capcom for the PlayStation 2, only in Japan. Taizo appears in the now-defunct web browser game Namco High as the principal of the high school, simply known as "President Dig Dug". Pookas appear in several Namco games, including Sky Kid (1985), Tinkle Pit (1993), R4: Ridge Racer Type 4 (1998), Pac-Man World (1999), Pro Baseball: Famista DS 2011 (2011), and in Nintendo's Super Smash Bros. for Nintendo 3DS and Wii U (2014). Dig Dug characters briefly appear in the film Wreck-It Ralph (2012).
