= Gamest =

Japanese video game magazine

- Cover art for the first issue of Gamest magazine, May 1986
- Categories: Arcade game
- Frequency: 1986: Bi-monthly; 1987-1992: Monthly; 1993-1999: Bi-weekly
- Format: Paper magazine
- Publisher: Shinseisha, Ltd.
- First issue: Issue #001: May 5, 1986
- Final issue: Issue #274: September 30, 1999
- Country: Japan
- Language: Japanese

Gamest (Note: Japanese: ゲーメスト, Hepburn: Gēmesuto) was a Japanese video game magazine that specialized in covering arcade games. Gamest originated from the bi-monthly fanzine VG2 Newsletter from the early 1980s. Following the bankruptcy of publisher Shinseisha, many editors would move to ASCII and create a successor magazine, Monthly Arcadia. The magazine also featured the annual Gamest Awards, which handed out awards to games based on user vote.

== Description ==
Published by Shinseisha, the magazine first began in May 1986 and was originally published bi-monthly, later changed to be a monthly-issued magazine in the late 1980s. The magazine had a heavy-focus on shoot 'em up arcade games,but would also cover games from other genres. The magazine ran for several years, with its final issue being released in September 1999. Gamest was subdivided into three sections: New Game Japanese: 初弾 (New Game Hatsutama), Report, and Comic.

== History ==
Gamest arose from the early 1980s bimonthly fanzine VG2 newsletter (VG2 Japanese: 会報, VG2 kaihō) which was also called VG2 Union magazine (VG2 Japanese: 連合誌, VG 2 rengō-shi) edited by Uemura Bankita (Japanese: 植村伴北, Uemura Tomokita).

The cover of the first issue of read "Game book Gamest - High score magazine for fans of games" (Japanese: ゲ一メス卜 Gamest Japanese: ゲームファンのためのハイスコアマガジン, Gēmesu boku Gamest Gēmufan no tame no haisukoamagajin). Initially, it covered arcade games with an emphasis on 2D Shoot 'em ups. From issue 6 on, it appeared monthly and from issue 116 (1994) the magazine was published twice a month.

In the mid-90s, the magazine covered mainly the then booming versus fighting game genre. In 1999, the magazine was discontinued without a final issue due to the sudden bankruptcy of the publisher Shinseisha. Thereafter, much of the Gamest staff transferred to the publisher ASCII (currently Enterbrain) who launched the arcade game magazine Monthly Arcadia (Japanese: 月刊アルカディア, Gekkan arukadia).

=== Shinseisha ===
Shinseisha Co., Ltd.
- Status: defunct (September 6, 1999)
- Founded: February 1971
- Country of origin: Japan
- Headquarters location: 〒101-8935 Tokyo, Chiyoda-ku, Jimbo Kanda-cho 1-chome 26
- Publication types: Publication and sale of game-related magazines
- Nonfiction topics: video games
- Fiction genres: game-related magazines
- Revenue: 2.7 billion 13 million yen (Year ended March 31, 1999)
- No. of employees: 60

Shinseisha (新声社, Shinseishiya) Co., Ltd. was a Japanese publisher founded in 1971 and who filed for bankruptcy in 1999. It originally published learning reference books, but it is more known for Gamest. The representative was Hiroshi Kato. The company's capital was 10 million yen. Major subsidiaries of Shinseisha were Marugeya Ltd. (株式会社マルゲ屋, Kabushikigaisha maruge-ya) and Shinkoe Publishing Ltd. (株式会社新声パブリッシング, Kabushikigaisha shinsei paburisshingu).

== Gamest Awards ==
The magazine featured annual Gamest Awards, which handed out awards to games based on user vote.
