= Bandai Namco Entertainment =

Japanese video game publisher

Bandai Namco Entertainment Inc.

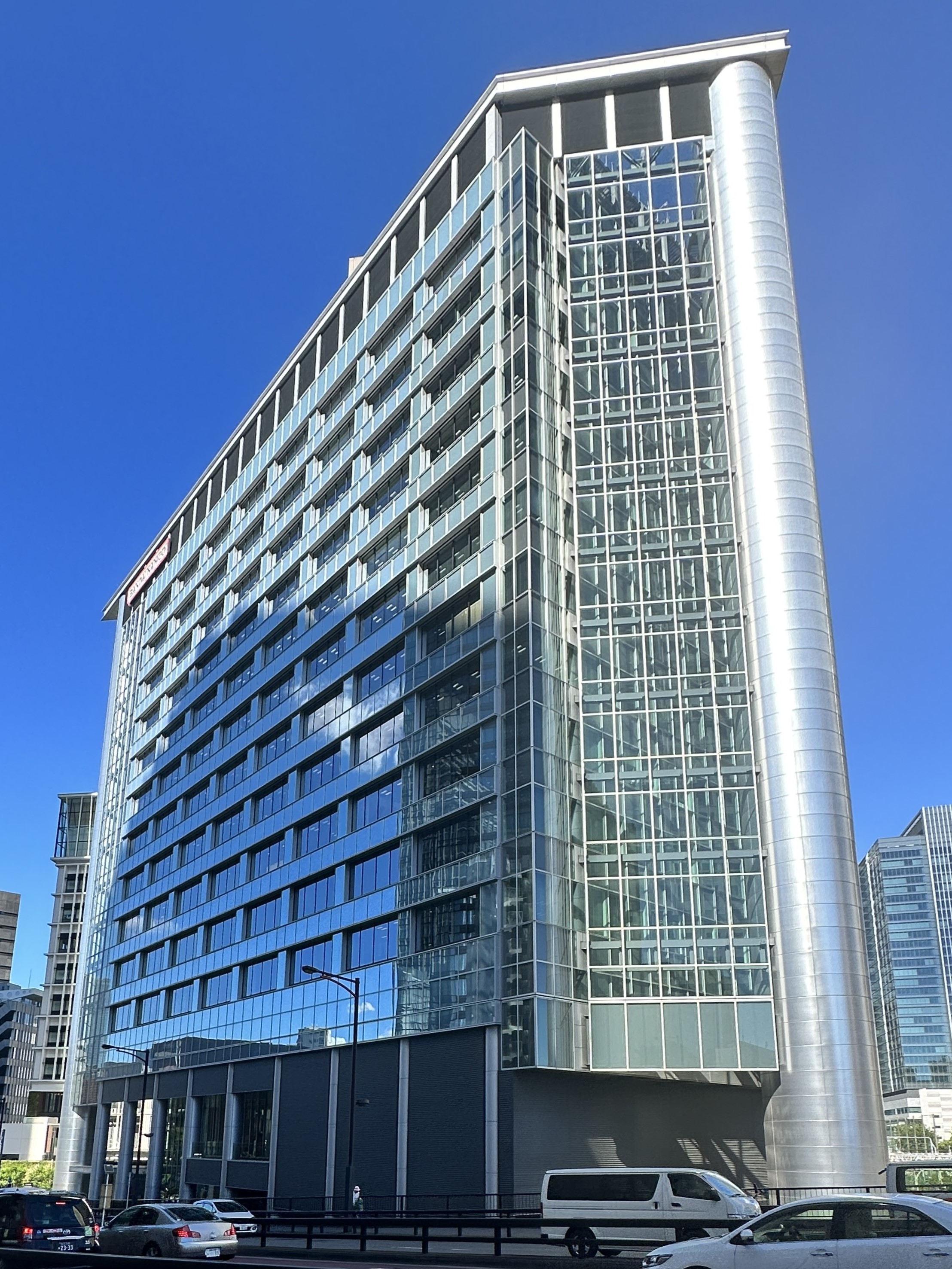
- HQ based at the same complex as its parent company, in Minato, Tokyo
- Native name: 株式会社バンダイナムコエンターテインメント
- Romanized name: Kabushiki-gaisha Bandai Namuko Entāteinmento
- Formerly: Namco Bandai Games Inc. (2006–2014); Bandai Namco Games Inc. (2014–2015)
- Type: Subsidiary
- Industry: Video games
- Predecessors: Namco (amusement and consumer video game divisions); Bandai (video game division)
- Founded: 31 March 2006; 20 years ago
- Headquarters: Shiba, Minato, Tokyo, Japan
- Area served: Worldwide
- Key people: Nao Udagawa (president and CEO)
- Products: List of Bandai Namco video games
- Revenue: ▲¥240.3 billion (US$1.52 billion) (2020)
- Operating income: ▲¥24.7 billion (US$156.02 million) (2020)
- Net income: ▲¥244.7 billion (US$1.55 billion) (2020)
- Number of employees: 790 (2024)
- Parent: Bandai Namco Holdings
- Subsidiaries: Bandai Namco Aces; Bandai Namco Studios; Reflector Entertainment; Bandai Namco Network Services; Bandai Namco Nexus; Bandai Namco Sevens; Bandai Namco Research; Bandai Namco Mobile; Bandai Namco Shimane Sunsanoo Magic; D3 Publisher; Bandai Namco Entertainment America; Bandai Namco Entertainment Europe; Bandai Namco Entertainment (Shanghai)
- Website: bandainamcoent.co.jp

Bandai Namco Entertainment Inc. (Note: Japanese: 株式会社バンダイナムコエンターテインメント, Hepburn: Kabushiki gaisha Bandai Namuko Entāteinmento; BNEI) (BNEI) is a Japanese multinational video game publisher and the video game branch of the wider Bandai Namco Holdings group. Founded in 2006 as Namco Bandai Games Inc., (Note: Japanese: 株式会社バンダイナムコゲームス, Hepburn: Kabushiki gaisha Bandai Namuko Gēmusu) it is the successor to Namco's home and arcade video game business, as well as Bandai's former equivalent division. Development operations were spun off into a new company in 2012, Namco Bandai Studios, now called Bandai Namco Studios.

Bandai Namco Entertainment owns several multi-million video game franchises, including Pac-Man, Galaxian, Tekken, Soulcalibur, Tales, Ridge Racer, Ace Combat, Digimon, Taiko no Tatsujin, The Idolmaster, Dark Souls, Gundam, .hack, and Little Nightmares. Pac-Man serves as the official mascot of the company.

The company also owns the licenses to several Japanese media franchises, such as Weekly Shōnen Jump (Dragon Ball, One Piece, Naruto, Bleach, JoJo's Bizarre Adventure, My Hero Academia), Kamen Rider, Super Sentai, Sword Art Online, and the Ultra Series.

== History ==
First logo as Namco Bandai Games (then Bandai Namco Games) was used until 2015.

On 4 January 2006, Namco Hometek and Bandai Games, the North American consumer game divisions of the former companies, merged to form Namco Bandai Games America Inc., with it absorbing Namco's American subsidiaries which was housed within Namco Hometek's former premises and completing Namco and Bandai's merge in North America. On 11 January, Bandai Namco Holdings Inc. announced that the Japanese video game divisions of Namco and Bandai would merge into Namco Bandai Games Inc. in March 2006. The merger would form together the home console game content, arcade game, and mobile content business under one roof. Both companies in a joint statement cited Japan's decreasing birth rates and advancements in technology as the reason for the merge, and to increase its relevance to newer audiences. Both companies worked independently under the newly formed Bandai Namco Holdings until 31 March 2006, when its video game operations were merged to form Namco Bandai Games. On 30 October, the European divisions of Namco and Bandai would merge as well, forming Namco Bandai Games Europe S.A.S.

In November 2007, Namco Bandai Games announced the absorption of Banpresto (which had been purchased in 2006) and will take over Banpresto's video game software and amusement equipment businesses (which had been traded independently) and will fold it into Namco Bandai Games as it started taken over Banpresto's video game publishing activities which had begun one year later on 1 April 2008, whilst Banpresto's prize business including development and sales of prizes such as UFO catchers was taken over by a new company under the Banpresto name. In August 2008, it was announced that Bandai Networks, Namco Bandai's mobile phone business, would also be merged into Namco Bandai Games on 1 April 2009 and folded.

In September 2008, Namco Bandai Games Europe entered into a joint-venture with holding company Infogrames Entertainment SA to form Distribution Partners S.A.S., which would consolidate Atari's entire distribution network outside of North America and Japan into a single business with exclusive physical packaged-goods distribution rights for video games produced by Namco Bandai and Infogrames within Europe, Asia, South America, Oceania and Africa. The venture would allow Namco Bandai Games to gain a distribution network for the PAL region and would hold a 34% stake, in addition to a stake in Atari Europe and its subsidiaries. On 4 December 2008, Namco Bandai Games America announced that it would form a new publishing label called "Surge". The label would focus on publishing mature titles intended for a western audience and was intended to create a separate identity solely for this purpose. The first title to be published under the label was Afro Samurai. No other titles were released under the label, with other titles that focused within that target audience such as Dead to Rights: Retribution and Splatterhouse being released under the Namco label instead to reflect the series' legacy.

In March 2009, Namco Bandai Games Europe announced it would purchase Atari's stake in Distribution Partners for €37 million and merge it into its own operations. This followed the news of Atari exiting the PAL distribution market to focus on publishing and developing for the massively multiplayer online market. Atari Europe's assets were merged and folded into Namco Bandai in May 2009 while its sale and marketing personnel were transferred to Distribution Partners, of which the prior deal would have allowed Namco Bandai to purchase the remaining 66% stake in Atari Europe June 2012-2013. The merger was completed on 7 July, and Distribution Partners was renamed as Namco Bandai Partners. Alongside that came Atari's entire distribution operations outside North America and Japan, including 100% of Atari Australia Pty Ltd. (formerly OziSoft Pty Ltd.), 100% of the shares of Atari Asia Holdings Pty. Ltd. and 100% of the shares of Atari UK Ltd. Atari would secure a five-year distribution deal for Namco Bandai Partners to exclusively distribute its titles in those territories. The merger would allow Namco Bandai Games to now hold operations in over 50 countries with 17 dedicated offices.

In 2010, Namco Bandai Games entered the Guinness World Records as the company that released the most TV commercials for the same product, a Nintendo DS game called Solatorobo: Red the Hunter. They created 100 versions of the ad as the game consists of 100 chapters.

In early 2011, Namco Networks was absorbed into Namco Bandai Games America, effectively consolidating Namco Bandai's American console, handheld, and mobile video game development operations.

On 2 April 2012, Namco Bandai Games spun off its development operations into a new company called Namco Bandai Studios. The new company was spurred by Namco Bandai's interest in faster development times and tighter cohesion between disparate development teams. It comprises approximately 1,000 employees, who were already part of Namco Bandai.

In March 2013, Namco Bandai Games established two new game studios. The first, Namco Bandai Studios Singapore, is Namco Bandai's "leading development center" in Asia and develops game content for the Asia Pacific market. The second studio, Namco Bandai Studios Vancouver, works on online social games and game content development for North America and Europe, and is part of the Center for Digital Media (CDM). In July 2013, it was announced that Namco Bandai Partners' operations would be merged into Namco Bandai Games Europe to push distribution and publishing into one entity.

Previous logo was used from 2015 to 2022.

In January 2014, Namco Bandai Games and its development division Namco Bandai Studios became Bandai Namco Games and Bandai Namco Studios, respectively. The change unified the brand internationally in order to increase the "value" and "appeal" of the name. The full company name was changed to Bandai Namco Entertainment on 1 April 2015.

In February 2014, Bandai Namco Holdings announced that beginning in April, it would cease publishing video games under the singular Namco, Bandai, and Banpresto labels; with all current and upcoming video games being published under the standard Bandai Namco Games label from then on.

On 1 April 2018, the amusement machine business division of Bandai Namco Entertainment was transferred over to sister company Bandai Namco Amusement.

On 31 July 2019, Bandai Namco Entertainment strengthen its mobile operations with the by establishing a mobile development studio based in Barcelona, Spain named Bandai Namco Mobile that would focus on developing and marketing mobile games for markets outside of Asia. The new mobile game development studio opened a year later in 2020 with Bandai Namco Europe & Bandai Namco America president and CEO Naoki Katashima leading the mobile division.

At the end of January 2020, Bandai Namco Entertainment who had established its joint-venture BXD with Drecom back three years prior in May 2017 had announced its acquisition of the remaining 49% of its joint-venture subsidiary BXD from its partner Drecom.

In September 2020, Bandai Namco Entertainment Europe acquired Canadian video game developer Reflector Entertainment.

In February 2021, Bandai Namco Entertainment Europe took a minority stake in German developer Limbic Entertainment, eventually becoming the majority stakeholder in October 2022.

In March 2021, Bandai Namco Amusement announced that withdrawal of the arcade game facility business in North America due to closure of various gaming facilities from the COVID-19 pandemic. Despite the announcement, Bandai Namco Amusement America was not affected by this withdrawal. In April 2021, Bandai Namco Entertainment America announced it would close its Santa Clara office and move to a new Southern California office.

In June 2022, Bandai Namco Entertainment and ILCA. Inc announced the establishment of Bandai Namco Aces, with 51% of the shares owned by Bandai Namco and 49% of the shares owned by ILCA. This new development company will be responsible for the development of AAA titles, including Ace Combat.

On 20 November 2024, Bandai Namco Entertainment announced the merger of Bandai Namco Online into the company, dissolving the subsidiary as a result with the employees joining the parent company. This came after the disappointing results of Blue Protocol and Gundam Evolution, games that performed below expectations with the dissolution set to be completed by April 2025.

On 18 December 2025, Bandai Namco Entertainment Europe sold off Limbic Entertainment to an undisclosed investor.

In April 2026, Bandai Namco Entertainment and entertainment company A24 announced that a film adaptation of the fantasy video game Elden Ring would be coming in March 2028. The film would be written and directed by Alex Garland, known for Civil War (2024), Annihilation (2018), and Ex Machina (2014), and be shot for IMAX.

=== United Galaxy Space Force ===
The United Galaxy Space Force (UGSF) is a fictional timeline and shared universe originally created by Namco that consists of many of its previous arcade titles, as well as some newer Bandai Namco video games. These span Namco's early hits like Galaxian, Galaga, and Bosconian. UGSF's lore connects games like Dig Dug, Mr. Driller, and Baraduke through their placement on the timeline and the protagonists being related to each other. A cancelled game, New Space Order, would have served as a larger introduction; however, a website chronicling the timeline was released in 2011, beginning with Ace Combat 3: Electrosphere and ending with Thunder Ceptor, only being updated in 2014 and 2025. Shadow Labyrinth integrates elements from the Pac-Man and Xevious franchises and was released in 2025.

== Corporate structure ==
Bandai Namco Entertainment was originally headquartered in Shinagawa, Tokyo, moving its operations to Minato-ku, Tokyo in February 2016. The North American and European divisions are respectively located in Irvine, California, as Bandai Namco Entertainment America, and in Lyon, France, as Bandai Namco Entertainment Europe. Divisions have also been established in mainland China, Hong Kong, and Taiwan.

Bandai Namco Entertainment is the core division of the Bandai Namco Group's "Content Strategic Business Unit" (Content SBU), and the main video game branch of Bandai Namco Holdings.

=== Subsidiaries ===
Name	Formed/acquired	Location	Purpose/Fate	Ref.
Bandai Namco Aces Inc.	2022	Shinjuku, Tokyo, Japan	Formed as a 51%/49% joint-venture with ILCA, this development studio mainly focuses on developing new content for the Ace Combat and Raiden franchise.	
Bandai Namco Studios Inc.	2012	Kōtō, Tokyo, Japan	Formed as a split from the development portion of Namco Bandai Games in April 2012, Bandai Namco Studios is the main development arm of the company. They create video games for home consoles, handheld systems, mobile devices and arcade hardware, with Bandai Namco Entertainment, Bandai Namco Mobile or Bandai Namco Amusement handling the management, marketing, and publishing of these products depending on the platform. Bandai Namco Studios also produces music and videos based on its properties and has development studios in the European, Asian, and Americas offices.	
Bandai Namco Mobile S.L.	2019	Barcelona, Spain	Established in July 2019. The company focuses on overseas development of creating and marketing mobile games for smartphones and tablets outside of Asia.	
Bandai Namco Network Services	2018	Minato-ku, Tokyo, Japan	It is a Japanese company responsible for the operation, distribution, localization, and technical support of content for Bandai Namco network services.	
Bandai Namco Nexus	2017	Minato-ku, Tokyo, Japan	Primarily engaged in the development and operation of online games	
Bandai Namco Research	2017	Minato-ku, Tokyo, Japan	Focus on researching AI technology for the creation of new entertainment, as well as developing other new technology.	
Bandai Namco Sevens	2019	Kami-Osaki, Shinagawa-ku, Tokyo	The company develops amusement machines primarily focusing on game specifications, video planning, and video production for pachinko and pachislot machines.	
D3 Publisher Inc.	2009	Chiyoda, Tokyo, Japan	Acquired by Namco Bandai Holdings in 2009, D3 Publisher mainly focuses on independent, low-cost titles, and is most known for the Simple series of budget-priced video games. It formerly had two branches: D3P of America and D3P of Europe.	

==== Former subsidiaries ====
Name	Formed/acquired	Closed/sold/merged	Location	Purpose/Fate	Ref.
Bandai Namco Online	2009	2025	Minato-ku, Tokyo, Japan	It was initially established as a development company focused in making games focused on online. It released multiple games over the years until 2025 when it was merged with its parent company Bandai Namco Entertainment.	
D3 Go!	2009	2022	Encino, California, United States	Originally formed as D3 Publisher of America, Inc. in 2005, it was included in D3's acquisition by Namco Bandai Holdings in 2009. They mainly focused production on licensed children's titles, when compared to its parent. They were restructured as a mobile game publisher in 2015 and renamed as D3 Go!. Italian video game company Digital Bros purchased the company from D3 and Bandai Namco in June 2022, and folded the company into 505 Games.	
Namco Bandai Partners S.A.S.	2008	2013	Lyon, France	Formed in September 2008 as Distribution Partners, this was a combination of the non-North American and Japanese distribution arms owned by Atari. It was initially 66% owned by Atari and 34% owned by Namco Bandai. Atari sold its stake to Namco Bandai in 2009, which renamed it as Namco Bandai Partners. They remained a separate subsidiary until being folded into Namco Bandai Games Europe in July 2013.	
Limbic Entertainment GmbH	2021	2025	Langen, Germany	A German video game development studio that focuses on game design and programming. Bandai Namco Entertainment Europe acquired a minority stake in the studio in February 2021 before increasing it into a majority stake in October 2022. They later sold the studio to an undisclosed investor in December 2025.	
Reflector Entertainment	2020	2026	Montreal, Canada	Originally formed by Alexandre Amancio and former Cirque du Soleil founder & businessman Guy Laliberté in 2017, Bandai Namco Entertainment Europe purchased all shares in the studio in September 2020, making Reflector a fully-owned subsidiary. The studio was shut down by Bandai Namco in November 2026.	

== See also ==
- List of Bandai Namco video game franchises
- List of Bandai Namco video games
