= Galaga (disambiguation) =

Galaga is a 1981 fixed shooter game developed and published by Namco.

Galaga may also refer to:

- List of Galaxian video games
  - Namco Galaga (1982 arcade hardware), Namco arcade game hardware
  - Galaga 3 (1984 arcade game), video game by Namco, sequel to Galaxian
  - Galaga '88 (1987 arcade game), video game by Namco, sequel to Galaga
  - Galaga: Destination Earth (2000 video game), video game from Hasbro by King of the Jungle, based on Galaga
  - Galaga 30th Collection (2011 computer game), video game by Namco Bandai based on Galaga

== See also ==
- Galaxian (disambiguation)
- Garaga
