= Galaga '91 =

1991 video game

- Japanese box art
- Developers: Namco; Now Production
- Publishers: JP: Namco; EU: Sega
- Series: Galaxian
- Platform: Game Gear
- Release: JP: October 25, 1991; EU: August 1993
- Genre: Fixed shooter
- Mode: Single-player

Galaga '91 (Note: Japanese: ギャラガ'91, Hepburn: Gyaraga Nainti Wan) is a 1991 fixed shooter video game developed and published by Namco for the Game Gear. It was published by Sega in Europe and renamed Galaga 2. The first portable installment in the Galaxian series, players control a lone starfighter in its mission to eradicate the hostile Galaga forces before they take over Earth. Gameplay revolves around shooting down formations of enemies and avoiding their projectiles.

Namco was assisted by Now Production, an external studio, during the game's development. It is loosely based on the 1987 arcade game Galaga '88 and its 1989 TurboGrafx-16 home port, incorporating similar mechanics featured in both games. Galaga '91 was well-received, and was a popular title for the Game Gear in Japan. Reviewers praised its colorful visuals and gameplay, and for being well-designed around the console's hardware. Some believed the limited screen resolution made it difficult to play.

== Gameplay ==
The player exchanges shots with enemies flying into formation.

Galaga '91 is a fixed shooter video game. Its plot involves an intergalactic organization, the United Galaxy Space Force, deploying a lone starfighter to rid the galaxy of the hostile Galaga aliens, who plan to eradicate all of mankind. The player controls this starfighter throughout eleven different stages, each becoming progressively difficult. Stages are indicated by small emblems that are located at the bottom-right of the screen. The final stage has the player facing off against a large boss enemy.

In each level, the objective is to destroy all of the Galaga aliens, which fly into formation from the top and sides of the screen. As in other Galaxian games, enemies will divebomb towards the player and attempt to collide with their ship while also firing projectiles. Atop the formation of enemies are four larger aliens known as the Boss Galaga, which take two shots to destroy. During a divebomb, they will sometimes use a tractor beam that can capture a player's ship and return with it to the top of the formation, costing the player a life. The player is able to shoot down a Boss Galaga holding the captured ship to rescue it and transform the player into a "dual fighter" with additional firepower and a larger hitbox. The player has to shoot the Boss Galaga holding the captured ship while it is divebombing; shooting the Boss Galaga while it is in formation will instead cause the fighter to turn against the player and act as an alien.

The third, eighth, and twelfth stages are bonus levels, which are indicated by the text "That Is Galactic Dancing". In these, enemies fly into the screen along pre-set paths without firing any projectiles. Players can shoot down the aliens to earn bonus points; destroying all enemies awards the player a large sum of points. Some stages are vertical-scrolling corridors, where players must avoid constantly-moving waves of enemies and other obstacles.

== Development and release ==
Galaga '91 was developed and published for the Game Gear by Namco. Minor assistance was provided by Now Production, a Japanese developer that collaborated before with Namco on a number of arcade conversions. As the first portable installment in the Galaxian series, '91 is based on the arcade game Galaga '88 (1987) and its TurboGrafx-16 home conversion (1989). It is not a direct port of '88, but instead a brand-new sequel that borrows and builds on mechanics established in its predecessor. The game was released in Japan on October 25, 1991. It was published under the Namcot banner, the former consumer game division of Namco. To promote the game, a LCD handheld was released, which has since become a prized collector's item. Galaga '91 was released in Europe in August 1993, where it was published by Sega and renamed Galaga 2. Its localized name has become a point of confusion, as Galaga was the follow-up to Galaxian and a North American upgrade kit for Gaplus was titled Galaga 3.

== Reception ==
Reception

Review scores
Publication	Score
ACE	3/5
Computer and Video Games	84/100
Famitsu	20/40
Beep!	3.5/5
Joystick	90/100
Mean Machines Sega	85%

Critics believed that Galaga '91 was a well-suited title for the platform. Computer & Video Games reviewer Tim Boone commended its accurate portrayal of Galaga '88, and made for a "decent blaster" on the Game Gear. This opinion was shared by both Jean-Marc Demoly of Joystick and a writer for ACE, who both enjoyed its simplicity. The graphics, in particular, were well-liked; Demoly enjoyed its sprite animations and a reviewer from Mean Machines Sega felt it was one of the game's strong points. Critics liked the gameplay itself for being fun and well-designed, with the Mean Machines reviewer calling it "a good blaster" for the Game Gear library. Not everyone showed praise; a Beep! writer felt that the limited screen size made it harder to avoid enemy shots and the graphics look squashed. ACE similarity felt that it suffered from the Game Gear's limited screen size, but nonetheless was still a fun game. In 1995, Sega Saturn Magazine reported that it was among the top 20 most-popular Game Gear games by reader vote.

In a retrospective on the franchise in 2006, Stuart Campbell of Retro Gamer showed his appreciation towards Galaga '91 for being built around the Game Gear's hardware and battery life. He felt it contained "addictive little bursts" during long trips, and was a quality title for the platform. A writer for 4Gamer.net briefly touched on the game in a 2020 retrospective article on Namcot. They compared its quality to the Family Computer home version of Galaga and its SG-1000 counterpart, Sega-Galaga, finding '91 to be an "extraordinary" update to both versions. The writer further added that aside from the small screen resolution, it made for a solid and worthwhile update to Galaga.
