= Galaxian (disambiguation) =

Galaxian is a 1979 shooter video game developed and published by Namco.

Galaxian may also refer to:

- List of Galaxian video games
  - Namco Galaxian (1980 arcade hardware), arcade cabinet video game hardware by Namco
  - Galaxian 2 (1981 video game), handheld shooter video game by Emtex, 2-player game based on Galaxian
  - Galaxian³ (1990 arcade game), shooter video game by Namco
- Astro Wars (1981 video game), aka Super Galaxian, tabletop shooter video game
- Galaxian (album), 1980 album by The Jeff Lorber Fusion
- Galaxians (supporters group), booster group for the soccer team L.A. Galaxy

== See also ==
- Galaga (disambiguation)
- Galaxy (disambiguation)
- Galaxia (disambiguation)
- Galactic (disambiguation)
