= Galaxy (disambiguation) =

A galaxy is an astronomical system that consists of a large number of stars and other matter.

Galaxy may also refer to:

== Astronomy ==
- The Milky Way, the galaxy which contains Earth's sun, often referred to as just "The Galaxy"

== People with the name ==
- Galaxy Craze (born 1970), novelist and actor
- Jackson Galaxy (born 1966), cat behaviorist and TV host
- Kaokor Galaxy (born 1959), a Thai boxer and Khaosai's twin brother
- Khaosai Galaxy (born 1959), a Thai boxer and Kaokor's twin brother

== Arts, entertainment, and media ==
=== Games ===
- Galaxy (video game), a 1981 computer game from Avalon Hill
- Galaxy Game, the second known coin-operated computer or video game, 1971
- Star Wars Galaxies, a 2003 online game
- Super Mario Galaxy, a 2007 video game
  - Super Mario Galaxy 2, its sequel
- Tentai Show, also known as Galaxies, a logic puzzle

=== Literature ===
- Galaxies, a 1980 book by Timothy Ferris
- Galaxy: The Prettiest Star, a 2022 graphic novel by Jadzia Axelrod
- The Galaxy (a.k.a. The Milky Way), a 1929 novel by Susan Ertz

=== Music ===
==== Music businesses ====
- Galaxy Records, record label
- Galaxy Studios, a multi-complex recording studio and post-production facility in Mol, Belgium

==== Groups ====
- Galaxy (U.K. funk soul group), a 1980s funk soul band including Phil Fearon
- Galaxy, a 2000s band including Emma McKenna and Katie Stelmanis
- The Galaxy, a Dutch anonym duo that produces future bass on Yellow Claw's record label Barong Family

==== Albums, EPs, and soundtracks ====
- Galaxies, a soundtrack by Kevin Braheny for the Hansen Planetarium show
- Galaxies, an album by The Digital Age
- Galaxy (Jeff Lorber Fusion album), 2012
- Galaxy (Rockets album), 1980
- Galaxy (War album)
- The Galaxy, an EP by the Axe Murder Boyz

==== Songs ====
- "Galaxies" (song), by synthpop act Owl City
- "Galaxy Song" by Monty Python
- "Galaxy" (Buck-Tick song), 2009
- "Galaxy" (Dannii Minogue song), released in 2017
- "Galaxy" (Jessica Mauboy song), featuring Stan Walker, 2011
- "Galaxy", a 2022 song by JID from The Forever Story
- "Galaxy", a 2020 song by Taeyeon from What Do I Call You

=== Periodicals ===
- Galaxy Science Fiction, American magazine published between 1950 and 1980, with a brief revival in 1994
- The Galaxy (magazine), a 19th-century American monthly

=== Radio ===
- Galaxy Birmingham, UK FM/DAB radio station
- Galaxy Communications, a radio broadcasting company based in New York
- Galaxy Digital, UK DAB radio station
- Galaxy Manchester, UK FM/DAB radio station
- Galaxy North East, UK FM/DAB radio station
- Galaxy Scotland, UK FM/DAB radio station
- Galaxy South Coast, UK FM/DAB radio station
- Galaxy Yorkshire, UK FM/DAB radio station
- The Galaxy Network, British radio network

=== Television ===
- Galaxy (Australian television), broadcaster
- Galaxy (UK TV channel), channel of British Satellite Broadcasting
- Galaxy High, a 1986 American-Japanese science fiction animated series
- Galaxy Television (Nigeria)

=== Other uses in arts, entertainment, and media ===
- Galaxy (sculpture), an outdoor sculpture by Alexander Liberman
- Galaxy Express 999, a manga
- Galaxy National Book Awards, formerly the Galaxy British Book Awards
  - Galaxy Novels, their publishing venture
- The Super Mario Galaxy Movie, a 2026 animated film

== Brands and enterprises ==
- Cineplex Entertainment (formerly Galaxy Entertainment, Inc.), Canadian cinema chain
- Galaxy (chocolate), a brand of milk chocolate
- Galaxy Entertainment Group, a hotels and casinos operator in Macau
- Galaxy Research, an Australian market-research company
- Galaxy Theatres, a US-based chain of movie theaters
- Samsung Galaxy, line of mobile computing devices

== Sports ==
- Frankfurt Galaxy (ELF), an American-rules football team
- Frankfurt Galaxy (NFL Europe), a defunct American-rules football team
- LA Galaxy, an American soccer (football) club in Major League Soccer
- The Galaxy (ATC), an Australian horse race
- TS Galaxy F.C., a South African soccer (football) club

== Technology ==
- Samsung Galaxy, a smartphone line
- Galaksija (computer), build-it-yourself home computer designed in 1983
- Galaxy (computational biology), a scientific workflow and data integration system
- Galaxy (satellite), a family of communications satellites operated by Intelsat
- Galaxy (spacecraft), a space station prototype
- Galaxy, the code name for the Sun Microsystems' SPARCserver 600MP series of computers

== Transportation ==
=== Aviation ===
- C-5 Galaxy, a military cargo airplane
- Galaxy Airlines (disambiguation)
- Gulfstream G200, also known as IAI 1126 Galaxy, a twin-engine business jet

=== Land transport ===
- Dawes Galaxy, a bicycle
- Ford Galaxy, a motor vehicle
- Geely Galaxy, Chinese electric vehicle marque

=== Ships ===
- MS Galaxy, a cruiseferry operated by Silja Line
- MV Galaxy (radio ship), offshore home of 1960s pirate radio station Wonderful Radio London
- MV Galaxy, a former Celebrity Cruises ship now named Marella Explorer
- USS Galaxy (IX-54), a US Navy ship

== Other uses ==
- Galaxy (shopping centre), in Szczecin, Poland
- Galaxy Towers, a waterfront condominium complex in Guttenberg, New Jersey, U.S.

== See also ==
- Galactic (disambiguation)
- Galax (disambiguation)
- Galaxi
- Galaxia (disambiguation)
- Galaxian (disambiguation)
- Galaxie (disambiguation)
- Gallaxy (musician)
