= Cosmo Gang =

Cosmo Gang (コズモギャング, Kozumo Gyangu) may refer to two Namco arcade games:

- Cosmo Gang the Video (1991), a fixed shooter which plays similar to Namco's own Galaxian.
- Cosmo Gang the Puzzle (1992), a puzzle game which is similar to Tetris, and became the basis for Pac-Attack.
