= Cosmo Gang the Video =

1992 video game

- Japanese arcade flyer
- Developer: Namco
- Publisher: Namco
- Designer: Kohji Kenjoh
- Composer: Yoshie Arakawa
- Series: Cosmo Gang
- Platforms: Arcade, Super Famicom
- Release: Arcade: JP: March 18, 1992; NA: April 1992; Super Famicom: JP: October 29, 1992
- Genre: Fixed shooter
- Modes: Single-player, multiplayer
- Arcade system: Namco System 2

Cosmo Gang the Video (Note: Japanese: コズモギャング ザ ビデオ, Hepburn: Kozumo Gyangu za Bideo) is a 1992 fixed shooter video game developed and published by Namco for arcades. Controlling the Hyper Beat starship, the player is tasked with ridding the galaxy of the Cosmo Gang, a race of aliens that cause mischief across Earth. Gameplay involves shooting enemies and avoiding projectiles. Power-up items can be collected to grant the player additional abilities. It ran on the Namco System 2 arcade board.

Cosmo Gang the Video features characters and ideas from Cosmo Gangs, an older Namco redemption game from 1990 that was exported outside Japan by Data East. The game is heavily based on the company's own Galaxian series, with early versions shown at tradeshows being titled Cosmo Galaxian. The arcade version of Cosmo Gang the Video was widely successful and well-received for its graphics, gameplay and music. A home conversion for the Super Famicom was released the same year, which was met with a more mixed response for its simplistic gameplay and lacking replay value. It was followed by Cosmo Gang the Puzzle later that same year. The arcade version was digitally re-released for the Japanese Wii Virtual Console in 2009. It was also re-released by Hamster Corporation for the Nintendo Switch and PlayStation 4 as part of the Arcade Archives series on April 20, 2023.

== Gameplay ==
Arcade version screenshot

Cosmo Gang the Video is a fixed shooter arcade game. Up to two players take control of the Hyper Beat starships — yellow for player one and white for player two — as they must rid the galaxy of the Cosmo Gang, a race of aliens causing mischief across Earth. In the multiplayer mode, one of the players is on top of the other, and share the same number of lives. Gameplay involves shooting down enemies as they fly into formation from the top and sides of the screen. Enemies will dive-bomb towards the bottom of the screen in an attempt to hit the player. Occasionally, a "Bakuto" alien will appear at the top of the screen while carrying a twin-shot power item, which can be collected by shooting it down.

Some enemies will drop special power-up items after being shot, which will give the player one of several abilities when collected — these include a one-hit shield, slow-moving bombs, a black hole that brushes all enemies in its area off the screen, and a jack-in-the-box that stuns all on-screen enemies for a brief period of time. In some rare cases, enemies may drop a Special Flag item from Rally-X that gives the player an extra life when collected. Small "P" items can also be found, which increase the rate of the player's shots when collected. In the multiplayer mode, two other power-up items can appear — one of which swaps the positions of the players, and the other allows the player to "fill up" the other player and make them burst, shooting out a large number of projectiles towards the enemy formation.

The game spans 32 stages. Later stages add in several new obstacles, including boxes that fire projectiles at the players, large coins that act as shields for the enemies, and draconic enemies that bring in reinforcements. Some stages are bonus rounds, which are recreations of the original redemption game this title is based upon — in these, the players are tasked with keeping the aliens at bay before they latch onto their cargo containers and drag them to the other side of the screen. Bonus points are awarded for each cargo container saved. The 32nd stage features the players fighting Don Cosmo, the final boss.

== Development and release ==
Cosmo Gang the Video was released in arcades by Namco in March 1992 in Japan, and in North America later that April. It was designed by Kohji Kenjoh, who later worked on the Custom Robo series for Nintendo, and composed by Yoshie Arakawa. The game features characters and mechanics taken from Cosmo Gangs, an older Namco redemption game from 1990 that was later exported outside Japan by Data East. It is heavily based on the company's own Galaxian series in terms of its gameplay and design. One of the game's music tracks is a parody of the opening song for the Japanese cooking show Kyōnoryōri. The game was presented at the 1991 Amusement Machine Show (AMS) tradeshow in Japan under the working title Cosmo Galaxian, alongside Namco's own Solvalou, Tank Force and Steel Gunner 2. A home port for the Super Famicom was released in Japan on October 29, 1992, which was later made available for the Nintendo Power flash cart service on August 1, 1998. The arcade version was digitally re-released for the Japanese Wii Virtual Console on August 4, 2009. Hamster Corporation released the arcade version as part of the Arcade Archives series for the Nintendo Switch and PlayStation 4 in April 2023.

== Reception ==
Reception

Review scores
| Publication | Score |
|---|---|
| Famitsu | 27/40 |
| Super Famicom Magazine | 23/30 |
| Super Play | 70% |
| Game Power | 73% |

Award
| Publication | Award |
|---|---|
| Gamest | Best Shooting Award 8th Annual Hit Game 17th |

Cosmo Gang the Video was widely successful in Japan, being praised for its graphics, gameplay and music. Game Machine listed it as the sixth most successful table arcade game of April 1992. Gamest awarded it both the 8th Best Shooting and 17th Annual Hit Game awards, citing its colorful visuals, cute character designs and gameplay reminiscent of Galaga. In a 2007 retrospective review, Retro Gamer praised the title's colorful visuals and quick-paced gameplay, saying that it was as addictive and well-designed as Namco's earlier arcade title Galaga '88.

The Super Famicom version was met with a more mixed reception, with common complaints being towards its gameplay and lack of replay value. Super Play magazine found the game inferior to Galaga '88, saying that it does little to build on the concept established in games such as Space Invaders, Galaxian and Galaga. Super Play also disliked its lack of replay value and its multiplayer mode for not being competitive. They concluded their review by saying that "Space Invaders is dead, and throwing bucketfuls of pretty graphics, humour and SNES flashiness at it isn't going to help". French publication Game Power criticized the game for repeating level layouts and backgrounds, unfavorably comparing it to Parodius Da! in terms of its art style and graphics. Super Play Gold said that its lack of content and simplistic gameplay didn't make it worth the price point, while SNES Force called it a "feeble attempt" to rework the gameplay of Space Invaders.

Japanese publication Famitsu was more positive in their coverage, finding it to be a faithful home conversion of the arcade original. They also liked its colorful visuals, soundtrack and multiplayer mode. A similar response was echoed by Super Famicom Magazine, who praised its vibrant graphics, catchy soundtrack and addictive gameplay. Super Play was positive towards the game's graphics, humor and lack of slowdown, alongside its "hectic" bonus stages and useful power-up items. Game Power liked its fast-paced gameplay, visuals and power-up items, Super Play Gold said that fans of the original arcade version would like the Super Famicom conversion for its colorful graphics and cuteness.

== Legacy ==
Some of the enemies and elements from Cosmo Gang and its puzzle spin-off appear in the moon areas Dig Dug Arrangement. A theme based on Cosmo Gang the Video is featured in Pac-Man 99 as special DLC.
