= Galaxie (disambiguation) =

Galaxie may refer to:

- Galaxie, the former name of Stingray Music, a Canadian digital television radio service.
- Ford Galaxie, an automobile made by the Ford Motor Company
- Galaxie 500, a 1980s American indie rock band
- Galaxie (band), a Canadian rock band
- "Galaxie" (song), a 1995 song by Blind Melon
- Galaxie (magazine), a Malaysian entertainment magazine
- Galaxie TV, a Czech television station, see Ice hockey broadcasting
- Galaxie Corporation, a cargo airline in the Democratic Republic of Congo
- Galaxie (magazine), a French sf magazine

== See also ==
- Galaxi, a roller coaster
- Galaxy (disambiguation)
- Galaxia (disambiguation)
