= Namco Community Magazine NG =

Japanese video game magazine

- The cover for NG Issue 1 (1983)
- Editor: Esuko
- Categories: Video games magazine
- Frequency: Quarterly (1983–1986); Bimonthly (1986–1993)
- Format: Journal, magazine
- First issue: February 15, 1983
- Final issue Number: April 4, 1993; 52
- Company: Namco
- Country: Japan
- Language: Japanese

Namco Community Magazine NG (Note: Japanese: ナムコーコミューニッティーマガジーンエヌジー, Hepburn: Namukō Komyūnittī Magajīn Enujī) was a video game magazine distributed by Namco in Japan. It was published quarterly from 1983 to 1986, and bimonthly from 1986 to 1993. Based on a suggestion made by company president Masaya Nakamura, its content relates to Namco video games and progressed to crafts, developer interviews, fan mail, and two manga series illustrated by Hiroshi Fuji.

NG stands for "Namco Games", created to connect Namco developers and fans. It was sold primarily through Namco-owned video arcades across the country, other arcades, and mail-order delivery. The magazine endured several financial difficulties, and was retired in 1993 and replaced with Nours, a similar current publication. NG has received praise retrospectively for its content and overall quality. The name was repurposed for the video game brand Namco Generations in 2010 and its manga series have since been reprinted as standalone novels.

== History ==
Old NG logo (1983—1989)

Namco Community Magazine NG was launched in Japan on February 15, 1983. Its creation was suggested by Namco founder and president Masaya Nakamura for the company's developers to interact directly with fans. It was headed by new-hire "Esuko", who also provided mailing duties. NG stands for "Namco Games", and was published quarterly in its early years and distributed primarily at Namco-operated video arcades free of charge. It is formatted to be easy to understand.

Early issues are formatted as more of a newsletter, featuring advertisements and information on Namco-related goods. Later content includes fan letters, developer interviews, papercraft models, and drawing workshops hosted by sprite artist Hiroshi "Mr. Dotman" Ono. It includes Mei Rou Yakata no Chana (Labyrinth of Chana) and GoGo no Kuni (Afternoon Country), two manga series illustrated by Valkyrie no Bōken character artist Hiroshi Fuji. It describes Namco's international operations, such as the impact of Pac-Man in North America.

After the first fourteen issues, NG switched from being distributed quarterly to bimonthly in November 1986. Distribution expanded to retail stores and competing video arcades. The switch from quarterly to bimonthly resulted in a reset in the issue number on the front cover, a page size increase from A5 to B4, and a small fee. Previous issues could be mail ordered, but budget constraints prevented mass-production. As such, NG issues became increasingly harder to find, while video arcades began giving away older issues for free.

With little income being generated from the magazine, Namco chose to retire NG on April 4, 1993 Its final issue features a congratulatory letter from the writing staff and other designers within the company. It was succeeded months later by Nours, a similar magazine with many of the same writers and staff members. When Namco merged with Bandai to form Namco Bandai Holdings in 2005, Nours was renamed B-Nours, continuing until it was merged with sister publication Side-B in April 2009. The current iteration of the magazine, Side-876, is available as a digital newsletter on the company's website.

== Legacy ==
Namco Community Magazine NG is fondly remembered by its readers for its content and distribution methods. Retrospective feedback on the magazine has been positive. Ranbu Yoshida, a writer for Famitsu, described the magazine's content as "really rich in variety" with plenty of interesting, provocative material. He believed NG was an influential publication for its distribution methods and overall quality. Yoshida showed appreciation particularly toward Afternoon Country with its detailed imagery and plot, calling it "something that cannot be expressed in words will remain in my heart". Gaming Alexandria founder Dustin Hubbard enjoyed its interesting write-ups and overall quality, writing that "they do not disappoint" for its small size. However, he commented on the "bit of a mess" that is the issue numbers, due to the way it was originally distributed.

In 2010, Namco Bandai Games (Namco's successor) announced the creation of a brand named Namco Generations, which was used for modernized remakes of classic Namco video games such as Pac-Man and Galaga. Each Namco Generations game came with a free digital newsletter that provided information on current and upcoming projects, a move believed to have been inspired by NG. The brand was discontinued in 2012 due to a lack of updates and the quality of its releases. In August 2019, Fuji revived Labyrinth of Chana in the form of a graphic novel. As the original manga left on a cliffhanger as a result of NG's discontinuation, the novel begins after the events of the magazine's final issue, with Fuji claiming that additional novels are in production.
