= Galaxy 2 =

Galaxy 2 or Galaxy II may refer to:

- Galaxy II (game), a play-by-mail game published by Brett A. Tondreau
- Samsung Galaxy S II, an Android smartphone
- Super Mario Galaxy 2, a platforming video game developed and published by Nintendo for the Wii
- Galaxy 2 (satellite), a Hughes geostationary communications satellite from the Galaxy satellite series
- Los Angeles Galaxy II, a soccer team in LA, CA, US

== See also ==
- Galaxy 2 Galaxy, a music collective
- Galaxy (disambiguation)
