= Galax (disambiguation) =

Galax is a flowering plant—also known as the wandplant or beetleweed.

Galax may also refer to:

- Galax, Virginia, United States
  - Galax High School
  - Galax Commercial Historic District
- Galax Saint Petersburg, a former Russian soccer team
- GALAX, a computer hardware brand of Galaxy Microsystems
- Sirius (game), an abstract strategy game also called Galax

== See also ==
- Galaxy (disambiguation)
