= Galaxy Television =

Galaxy Television may refer to:

- Galaxy Television (Nigeria)
- Galaxy (Australian television), a former cable television and satellite television company in Australia
- Galaxy (British television), the Galaxy Channel operated by British Satellite Broadcasting
- Galaxy TV, a TV channel in the 2000 Indian film Phir Bhi Dil Hai Hindustani

== See also ==
- Galaxy (disambiguation)
