= Galaxy Airlines =

Galaxy Airlines may refer to:

- Galaxy Airlines (Japan)
- Galaxy Airlines (United States)

== See also ==
- Galaxy Air, defunct Kyrgyz airline
- Galaxy Airways, defunct Greek airline
