= Galaxia =

Galaxia may refer to:

- The superior form of Gaia (Foundation universe), a planet in Isaac Asimov's Foundation Series
- Galaxia (plant), a genus in the iris family
- "Galaxia", a 1996 trance song by Ferry Corsten
- Sailor Galaxia, an antagonist from the original Sailor Moon anime series
- Galaxia, the sword Meta Knight wields in the Kirby video game series
- Galaxia, Hong Kong, a private housing estate in Diamond Hill, Hong Kong
- Operation Galaxia, the codename for 1978 attempted coup d'état in Spain

== See also ==
- Galaxias, a genus of small freshwater fish in the family Galaxiidae
- Galaxy (disambiguation)
- Galaxie (disambiguation)
- Galaxian (disambiguation)
