= Hiroshi Ono (artist) =

Japanese video game artist (1957–2021)

- 小野 浩
- Born: June 24, 1957
- Died: October 16, 2021 (aged 64)
- Other name: Mr. Dotman
- Occupation: Video game artist
- Years active: 1979–2020
- Notable work: Galaga, Dig Dug

Hiroshi Ono (Japanese: 小野 浩, Hepburn: Ono Hiroshi) (June 24, 1957 – October 16, 2021) was a Japanese video game artist. He spent most of his career at Namco and later Bandai Namco, designing pixel art and cabinet artwork for their arcade video games. Because of his focus and expertise on pixel art, he was nicknamed Mr. Dotman and The Wizard of Dot Art.

== Early life ==
Ono was born on June 24, 1957, and raised in Chūō and Kokubunji in Tokyo, where he learned to paint tiles for Japanese bathhouses. He attended the Nippon Designer Gakuin vocational school in Shibuya for his secondary education, where he received training under Tarō Okamoto, Yumeji Takehisa, and Shigeo Fukuda that continued his tile artwork skills into graphic arts. Near graduation, he failed to obtain a job at toy company Tomy, but one of his professors suggested he apply at Namco instead, which at the time was becoming a leading Japanese company in arcade video games.

== Career ==
Ono was hired at Namco in 1979, and one of his first tasks was to help improve the logo and bezel art for Galaxian. As he became more involved with other projects, such as Tank Battalion and Warp & Warp, he also began working on the pixel art used within the game itself in addition to the physical game cabinet art. Many of Namco's arcade games during the golden age of arcade video games through the early 1980s featured his pixel art, including Galaga, Dig Dug, and Mappy. He helped to contribute art and columns to a Namco fan newsletter NG, where another Namco employee gave him the moniker "Mr. Dotman", which he readily accepted for the rest of his life. Shigeru Yokoyama, the creator of Galaga, called him "an authority on pixel design" for arcade games. He was called The Wizard of Dot Art.

Between 1989 and 2000, Ono was transferred to Namco's electro-mechanical game division, where he continued to design art and layout for the game cabinets, such as Golly! Ghost!. He was then transferred to Namco's new mobile game division established in 2000, which allowed him to return to creating pixel art. He continued in this role even after the merger of Bandai and Namco into Bandai Namco in 2005. As mobile devices evolved beyond only pixel art, he left the company in 2013 so as to progress his work independently. As a freelance artist, he was hired by third-party studios to help develop pixel art for mobile and other types of games, including for those published through Bandai Namco, such as The Idolmaster and Tales of... series.

Ono remained active until 2020 when he reported that a mysterious illness destroyed his mobility, and his home was burgled of some of his early Namco works, so he reduced his freelance work.

In 2021, a successful Kickstarter was launched to create a documentary on his career.

== Death ==
Ono died on October 16, 2021, from suspected autoimmune hepatitis.
