= Galaga: Destination Earth =

2000 video game

- European PlayStation cover art
- Developers: King of the Jungle; Pipe Dream Interactive (GBC)
- Publishers: Hasbro Interactive; Majesco (GBC)
- Series: Galaxian
- Platforms: Game Boy Color, PlayStation, Windows
- Release: Game Boy Color: NA: September 20, 2000; PlayStation: NA: October 23, 2000; UK: October 2000; EU: November 10, 2000; Windows: NA: September 27, 2000
- Genre: Shoot 'em up
- Mode: Single-player

Galaga: Destination Earth, known in the Game Boy Color version as Galaga, is a 2000 shoot 'em up video game developed by King of the Jungle and published by Hasbro Interactive and Majesco for Microsoft Windows, PlayStation, and Game Boy Color. It is an update to the 1981 arcade game Galaga.

== Gameplay ==
Destination Earth includes nine stages, each consisting of several "waves" of alien attackers and bonus waves. Most of the stages are planetary locations, like an Ancient Egyptianish Mars, Metropolitan Earth, and Saturn. Some are non-planet astronomical objects like the moon or the sun. On the final stage, the player finds must battle on a "planetoid". The "waves" consist of three preset views denoted as ALPHA (1st person), DELTA (side scroller), and GAMMA (top view or original; "Galaga" view).

If a tractor beam ship is destroyed, there is a chance that a cube will come out. If the player catches this cube, they will get a temporary tractor beam that can capture an enemy ship. Captured enemy ships will then act as wing-men for your fighter until destroyed by enemy fire, just as they do in Gaplus.

== Reception ==
Reception

Aggregate score
| Aggregator | Score | | |
| Aggregator | GBC | PC | PS |
|---|---|---|---|
| Metacritic | N/A | 59/100 | 57/100 |

Review scores
| Publication | Score | | |
| Publication | GBC | PC | PS |
|---|---|---|---|
| AllGame | 1.5/5 | N/A | 1/5 |
| Electronic Gaming Monthly | N/A | N/A | 4/10 |
| EP Daily | N/A | 5/10 | N/A |
| Game Informer | 2/10 | N/A | N/A |
| GameFan | N/A | N/A | (G.H.) 71% 57% (Note: In GameFan's viewpoint of the PlayStation version, three critics gave it each a score of 70, 53, and 47.) |
| GameSpot | N/A | N/A | 4.3/10 |
| GameZone | N/A | 6/10 | N/A |
| IGN | 3/10 | 6.2/10 | N/A |
| Next Generation | N/A | N/A | 2/5 |
| Official U.S. PlayStation Magazine | N/A | N/A | 2.5/5 |
| PC Zone | N/A | 19% | N/A |

The Windows and PlayStation versions received "mixed" reviews according to review aggregation website Metacritic. Jeff Lundrigan of NextGen said of the latter version, "Despite the nostalgia factor, this seems to be aimed at the mass market, not the hardcore. As such, it's relatively simple and not that thrilling."
