= Galaxian 2 =

- Game box
- Publisher: Entex Industries
- Series: Galaxian
- Platform: Handheld
- Release: NA: 1981
- Genre: Fixed shooter
- Modes: Single-player, multiplayer

Galaxian 2 (also written as Galaxian II) is a handheld electronic game that was released in 1981 in the US by Entex Industries. It was also released the same year in Japan under the name Astro Galaxy and in Europe under the name Astro Invader. The game was also released under the Futuretronics brand in Australia.

The game is called Galaxian 2 because it has a two-player mode. It is not a sequel; there is no Entex Galaxian.

== Description ==
Gameplay

The gameplay is based on the Galaxian arcade game. The player shoots at waves of attacking aliens as they launch kamikaze attacks. There are two user-selectable skill levels.

In Galaxian 2, the player's ship is known as the Galaxy ship. In two-player mode, one player controls the Galaxy ship and the other player acts as the opponent, controlling the attacking aliens.

The maximum score that can be represented on the display is 9,999 points and will automatically wrap around to 0000.

== Hardware ==
Galaxian 2 uses a fixed three-color VFD display, with the main play area having eight columns and twelve rows with dancing stars in the background.

The case of the game is designed to look like the exterior of a spaceship, reminiscent of Battlestar Galactica.

Holding down the "missile" button whilst turning the game on initiates a graphical test and the game also has simple sound effects which can be turned off.

Galaxian 2 takes four C type batteries or an AC adapter.

== Reception ==
Games magazine included Galaxian 2 in their "Top 100 Games of 1981", commenting that it "goes light years beyond" Entex's Space Invaders.

Jaro Gielens, author of the book Electronic Plastic, described the game as an "Excellent 2-player space shooter, with very special case design".

== Legacy ==
The Futuretronics version of the game is shown in the movie Doom (2005).
