= Galaxie (Malaysian magazine) =

- The final issue of Galaxie (1–16 December 2013)
- Editor: Gordon Kho
- Categories: Celebrity magazine
- Frequency: Fortnightly
- Circulation: 50,000
- First issue: October 1974
- Final issue: 1–16 December 2013
- Company: Star Publications(M) Sdn. Bhd.
- Country: Malaysia
- Language: English
- Website: Galaxie Blog

Galaxie was a fortnightly entertainment magazine in Malaysia and published by Star Publications (M) Sdn. Bhd. The magazine was published from October 1974 to December 2013. It was also available in neighboring country, Singapore. The magazine stopped being printed after 39 years. The last issue was the 1-16 Dec (2013) issue which featured Elton John, Michael Jackson, Mariah Carey and Eminem, each of whom represent a decade of entertainment.

== Awards and Recognitions ==
Galaxie has been named Entertainment Magazine Of The Year by trade magazine Advertising + Marketing in 2011, 2012 and 2013.
