= Arcade Classic =

Video game series

- Genre: Action
- Developers: The Code Monkeys; Namco; Williams Electronics
- Publisher: Nintendo
- Platform: Game Boy
- Original release: 1995

Arcade Classic is a series of video game compilations of arcade games published by Nintendo for the Game Boy. Released in 1995, each cartridge includes two games. The first two collections are bundles of pre-existing ports of Atari Corporation games, developed by The Code Monkeys and originally published by Accolade. Nintendo would release two more compilations in the series, a pre-existing compilation by Namco as well as a new compilation developed by Williams Electronics, having retained the trademark.

- Arcade Classic No. 1: Asteroids / Missile Command
- Arcade Classic No. 2: Centipede / Millipede
- Arcade Classic No. 3: Galaga / Galaxian
- Arcade Classic No. 4: Defender / Joust
