= Sirius (game) =

Board game

- Other names: Galax
- Designers: Martial Tramond
- Publishers: Bütehorn Spiele; Hexagames; Ludate
- Publication: 1976; 50 years ago
- Genres: Abstract strategy
- Players: 2
- Playing time: 30 minutes
- Age range: 8+

Sirius, or Galax, is an abstract strategy game designed by Martial Tramond and published by Bütehorn Spiele in 1976. Players move pieces of three different types, capturing their opponent's according to a hierarchy similar to rock paper scissors until all on one side are eliminated.

== Gameplay ==
Each player places their thirty game pieces–10 suns, 10 moons, 10 stars–in any order on the first three rows of a 10×10 board. On their turn, a player moves one piece in any direction onto a space that is either empty or has an opponent's piece that can be taken according to a circular hierarchy: sun takes moon, moon takes star, and star takes sun. If a piece is taken, it is removed from the game and the capturing piece moves onto its square.

Pieces that make it to the opposing end of the board become "Champions", which can move two squares on their turn and can take opposing pieces of any type. The winner is the player who captures all their opponent's pieces.

== Reception ==
Jeux & Stratégie praised Sirius for its easy-to-learn rules and clever gameplay, referencing the lack of an obvious ideal strategy which allows players to discover their own. However, John Woodwark, writing for Games & Puzzles, noted that Champions quickly unbalance the game and that "being the first to reach the opposite back line might as well be the object of the game." He also criticized Sirius's English rules translation and lack of originality, but praised the quality of the game pieces. Science & Vie rated Sirius an overall score of 7/10, giving high marks for the game's rules clarity, originality and presentation, and praising its balance of strategic piece placement during setup and tactical movement during the game.
