= Cosmo Gang the Puzzle =

1992 video game

- Japanese arcade flyer
- Developer: Namco
- Publisher: Namco
- Director: Kohji Kenjoh
- Series: Cosmo Gang
- Platforms: Arcade, Super Famicom, mobile phone
- Release: Arcade: WW: November 1992; Super Famicom: JP: February 26, 1993; Mobile: JP: September 21, 2005
- Genre: Puzzle
- Modes: Single-player, multiplayer

Cosmo Gang the Puzzle (Note: Japanese: コズモギャング ザ パズル, Hepburn: Kozumo Gyangu Za Pazuru) is a 1992 falling block puzzle video game developed and published by Namco for arcades. The third game in its Cosmo Gang series, succeeding that year's Cosmo Gang the Video, players stack groups of blocks and aliens known as Jammers in a vertical-oriented well. The objective is to clear as many objects on the screen before they reach the top of the screen. Blocks are cleared by aligning them into complete horizontal rows, while Jammers are cleared by defeating them with blue-colored spheres.

Namco ported the game to the Super Famicom a year later in 1993. This version of the game was reworked and reskinned as Pac-Attack for North American and European markets, and was later ported to other consoles such as the Sega Genesis and Game Boy. Cosmo Gang the Puzzle was met with a mixed reception from critics, being praised for its multiplayer aspect and gameplay but criticized for its graphics.

== Gameplay ==
The player dropping blocks and Jammers in the single-player mode

Cosmo Gang the Puzzle is a falling tile puzzle game in the vein of games such as Tetris (1985) and Puyo Puyo (1991). The objective is to drop down formations of descending blocks and pink-colored aliens named "Jammers" in a vertical-oriented playfield. Blocks are cleared by matching them into complete horizontal rows of six. Jammers cannot be cleared by aligning them in rows, and are instead cleared by placing a blue-colored sphere on top of or near them, which will defeat any Jammers in its path and disappear when stuck in a spot with no Jammers left. The arrow shown on the sphere indicates the direction it moves. Defeating Jammers fills a portion of a meter situated at the center of the screen; when filled, a star drops from the top of the puzzle well that clears all Jammers beneath it. The game ends once the objects reach the top of the screen.

Alongside a single-player option, a multiplayer option is also available. The second player's screen will replace the Jammers with white-colored robots named 'Pipopapo-Tai", which behave the same as regular Jammers. In the multiplayer mode, the objective is to fill up the other player's screen, which can be accomplished by clearing more Jammers than the other player, causing the other's enemies to fall onto the opponent's side. The game will end once a player's blocks and Jammers reach the top.

== Development ==
The development of Cosmo Gang the Puzzle began shortly after the completion of its predecessor, Cosmo Gang the Video (1992). Its production team shared many of the same members, including its director Koji Miki and several graphic artists. The decision to make the third Cosmo Gang game, a puzzle game instead of a shoot 'em up, was based on the success of other falling tile puzzlers, namely Tetris and its sequel Hatris (1990). Puzzle games had proven to be popular and lucrative for arcades and home video game consoles due to their simplicity and room for innovation, so the development team thought this would make The Puzzle easy to market.

Cosmo Gang the Puzzle entered production in mid-1992 and was developed on a tight schedule. The Video possessed a lengthy development process and required a lot of energy and time from its staff, so The Puzzle was designed to be more simplistic in comparison. To save time, the graphics were recycled and altered from those in The Video. One of the graphic artists had difficulty designing the sprites as they wanted to keep the cutesy look of the Cosmo Gang characters while still being confined to a 16x16 pixel space. Though the team designed it to be easy for beginners, Namco executives made the team increase the difficulty to make it more appropriate for arcades. The soundtrack was composed by Mie Arakawa, who wanted it to retain the wacky and comical nature of the series.

== Release ==
Namco released Cosmo Gang the Puzzle in November 1992, running on the Namco NA-1 arcade system. A home port for the Super Famicom began development shortly after and was published on February 26, 1993. The development team took the game's difficulty and strategies into account for the home version and chose to include a "Genius Book", which detailed different strategies and methods that players could use for the game. Namco considered releasing this version overseas but didn't believe it would sell well as the Cosmo Gang characters were not popular outside Japan. Namco Hometek retooled The Puzzle into a Pac-Man game, resulting in the release of Pac-Attack (1993).

Two versions of Cosmo Gang the Puzzle were produced for Japanese mobile phones; one was released for i-Mode in 2005 and the other for Yahoo! Keitai in 2007. The Super Famicom version was released for the Wii's Virtual Console in 2008, followed by the arcade version in 2009. A second retooling of The Puzzle that replaced the characters with those from Katamari Damacy, titled Korogashi Puzzle Katamari Damacy, was released in 2009 for DSiWare. The Super Famicom version was re-released for the Wii U's Virtual Console in 2015 and outside Japan for the first time as part of the Nintendo Classics service in September 2024. Hamster Corporation released the original arcade version as part of their Arcade Archives series for the Nintendo Switch and PlayStation 4 in January 2024.

== Reception ==
Reception

Review scores
Publication	Score
Famitsu	28/40
GamesMaster	55%
Sinclair User	76/100
Super Play	58%
Super Famicom Magazine	21.63/30

Award
Publication	Award
Gamest	7th Gamest Award, 16 Annual Hit Game

Cosmo Gang the Puzzle was only a moderate success in arcades. It was awarded the 16th Annual Hit Game award from Gamest based on reader vote. A writer for Sinclair User enjoyed the game for its addictive quality and mechanics. They wrote that while it wasn't an original concept by any means, Cosmo Gang the Puzzle was still an enjoyable game in its own right, and made for a solid take on the Tetris formula.

For the Super Famicom version, reviewers often complained the gameplay wasn't as gratifying or well-designed as other puzzle games available. The four reviewers of Famitsu felt that it lacked the same level of refinement as Puyo Puyo or the simplicity of Tetris. Andy Lowe from GamesMaster stated that while he felt Cosmo Gang the Puzzle possessed more "involved" gameplay than Tetris, it lacked substance and didn't have as many features that other similar games had. Super Play's Matt Bielby disliked the difficulty for being too easy and the gameplay for becoming tedious after a while, writing that its quirkiness couldn't save it from becoming "cupboard-fodder". Andy and Bielby both found the price too expensive for a game that offered little in the way of content.

Critics showed appreciation towards Cosmo Gang the Puzzle for its novelty and some of its concepts. Lowe said that the game had a wider scope than other Tetris clone games did, and that it "features some devilishly strategic touches" that other titles lacked. Biebly agreed and said that what little depth that Cosmo Gang had was very innovative, finding some of Namco's additions to be creative. Writers for both Famitsu and Super Famicom Magazine liked the multiple gamemodes for offering a different take on the falling tile gameplay. Famitsu staff in particular were fond of the Vs. Mode for its more relaxing pace, writing that it was a necessity for games of its kind. Lowe and Bielby both enjoyed the puzzle mode for its layer of strategy and depth; Lowe in particular believed that it was the best aspect of the game. The game's graphics, character animations, and soundtrack also received praise. Super Famicom Magazine concluded their review by writing that Puzzle made for a nice addition to the console's library, and outclassed the arcade original with its new features.

== See also ==
- Pac-Attack
- Korogashi Puzzle Katamari Damacy
