= Galaxy (video game) =

1981 video game

- Developer(s): Microcomputer Games
- Publisher(s): Powersoft; Avalon Hill
- Designer(s): Thomas Cleaver
- Platform(s): Apple II, Atari 8-bit, PET, Commodore 64, IBM PC, FM-7, TI-99/4A
- Release: Galactic Empires: 1979; Galaxy: 1981
- Genre(s): Simulation, strategy

Galaxy is a 1981 video game published by Avalon Hill and developed by Microcomputer Games for the Apple II, TRS-80, Atari 8-bit computers, Commodore PET, Commodore 64, IBM PC compatibles, FM-7, and TI-99/4A. It was originally published as Galactic Empires by Powersoft in 1979.

== Contents ==
Galaxy is a strategy game for up to 20 players, in which the object is to conquer the most planets within a number of turns as chosen by the players before the game starts.

== Reception ==
Bruce Webster reviewed Galactic Empires in The Space Gamer No. 31. Webster commented that "It is one of the five best computer games and easily the best multi-player computer game I've ever seen."

Dana Holm reviewed Galaxy in The Space Gamer No. 61. Holm commented that "In the multi-player computer games market, there are not that many games. This is a welcome addition to that collection."
