= Galaxy (shopping mall) =

Shopping centre in Szczecin

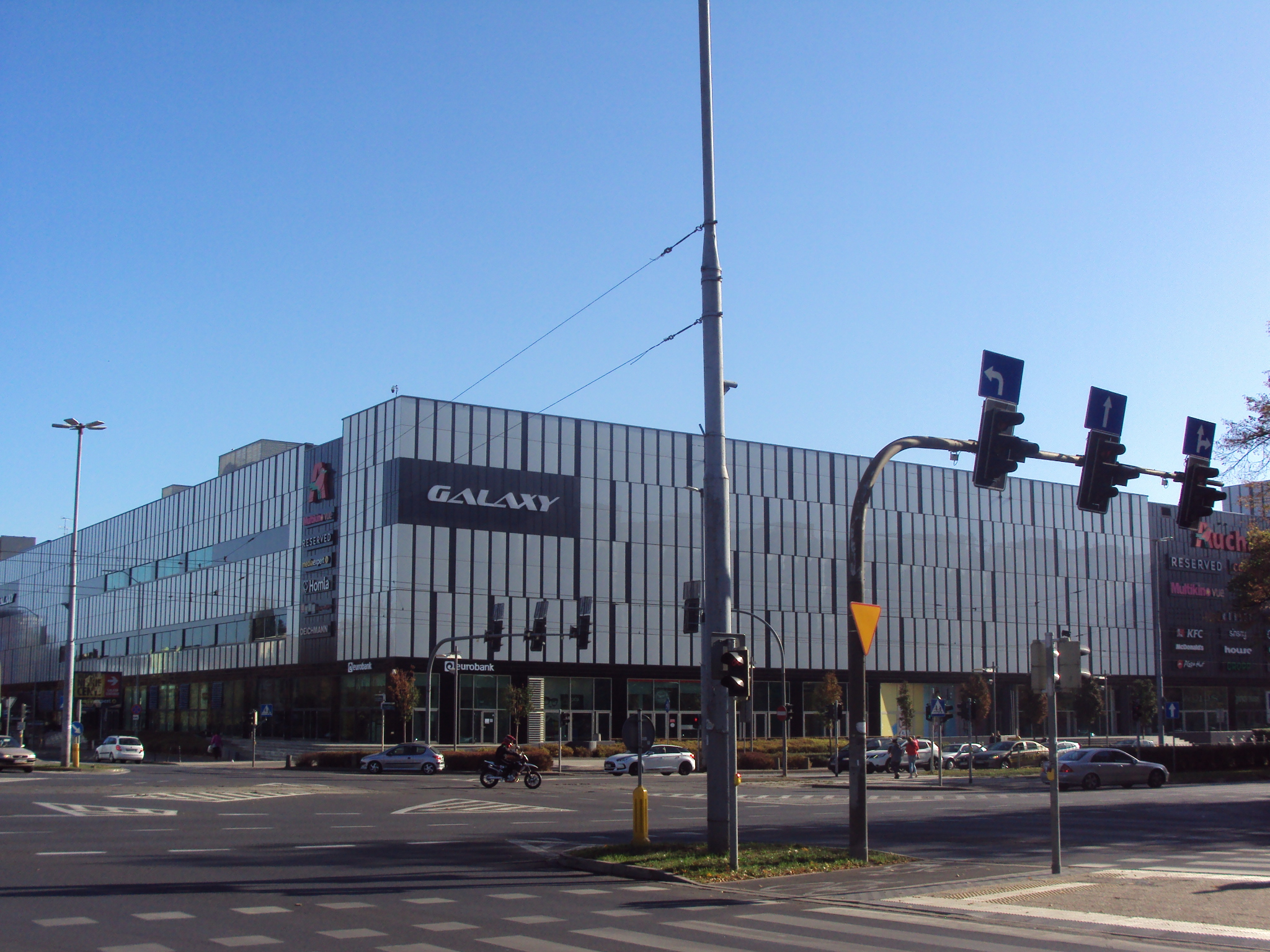
- Galaxy shopping centre.
- Interactive map of the Galaxy area

General information
- Type: shopping centre
- Location: Szczecin, Poland, 18–20 Wyzwolenia Avenue
- Coordinates: 53.4340°N 14.5555°E
- Owner: Echo Investment

Technical details
- Floor count: 3; 5 (with car park)

Galaxy is a shopping mall in the city of Szczecin, Poland, that is located at 18–20 Wyzwolenia Avenue next to the intersection with Malczewskiego Street, and near the Pazim building. It is owned by Echo Investment and was opened in 2003.

== Description ==
The Shopping centre was expanded with a new wing in 2017, which was built in place of the Orbis Neptun hotel which was demolished in 2017. After the expansion, the total shopping area of the centre is 59,500 m^{2} (640452.67 square feet). The building has 3 storeys. It currently has 200 stores, gastronomical locations and an Auchan hypermarket (previously Real) with an area of 7,700 m^{2} (82882.11 square feet). Additionally, it has a Multikino cinema, a bowling alley and a Calypso gym. It has 2 car parks: multistorey and underground with a combined capacity of 1,500 parking spaces. The owner declared, that in 2012, the shopping centre has been visited by around 12 million people.
