= Galaga 30th Collection =

2011 video game

- Developer: Namco Bandai Games
- Publisher: Namco Bandai Games
- Series: Galaxian
- Platform: iOS
- Release: June 9, 2011
- Genre: Fixed shooter
- Mode: Single-player

Galaga 30th Collection (Note: Japanese: ギャラガ30コレクション, Hepburn: Gyaraga 30 Korekushon) is a 2011 video game compilation published for iOS devices by Namco Bandai Games. It was created to commemorate the 30th anniversary of Galaga.

It allows users to play remakes of the games in the Galaxian series. It is free to download and comes with Galaga's predecessor, Galaxian. The remakes of Galaga, Gaplus, and Galaga '88 are available as in-app purchases either separately or as a bundle. The graphics from the original games are shaded to look "glossy", and music is added to parts that did not have music in the original games. The application has also a one and a half minute long CGI video that plays as an intro before the title screen which features "Galaga points" and is collected as the games are played and are used to unlock various consumable power-ups and special arcade cabinet designs, including the original art for each game.

The application was pulled from the App Store on March 31, 2017.

== Reception ==
Reception

Aggregate score
| Aggregator | Score |
|---|---|
| Metacritic | 68/100 |

Review scores
| Publication | Score |
|---|---|
| Eurogamer | 6/10 |
| GamePro | 3/5 |
| Pocket Gamer | 4/5 |
| TouchArcade | 4/5 |
| Slide to Play | 2/4 |

Galaga 30th Collection was listed as an honorable mention for Gamasutra's Top 10 Games Of The Year for 2011.
