= Galaxy Airways =

Greek airline

Galaxy Airways was a Greek airline with both scheduled and charter flights. It was based in Athens, and existed from 1999 to 2001. It had a fleet of 3 aircraft, one Boeing 737-500 and two Boeing 737-400.

== History ==
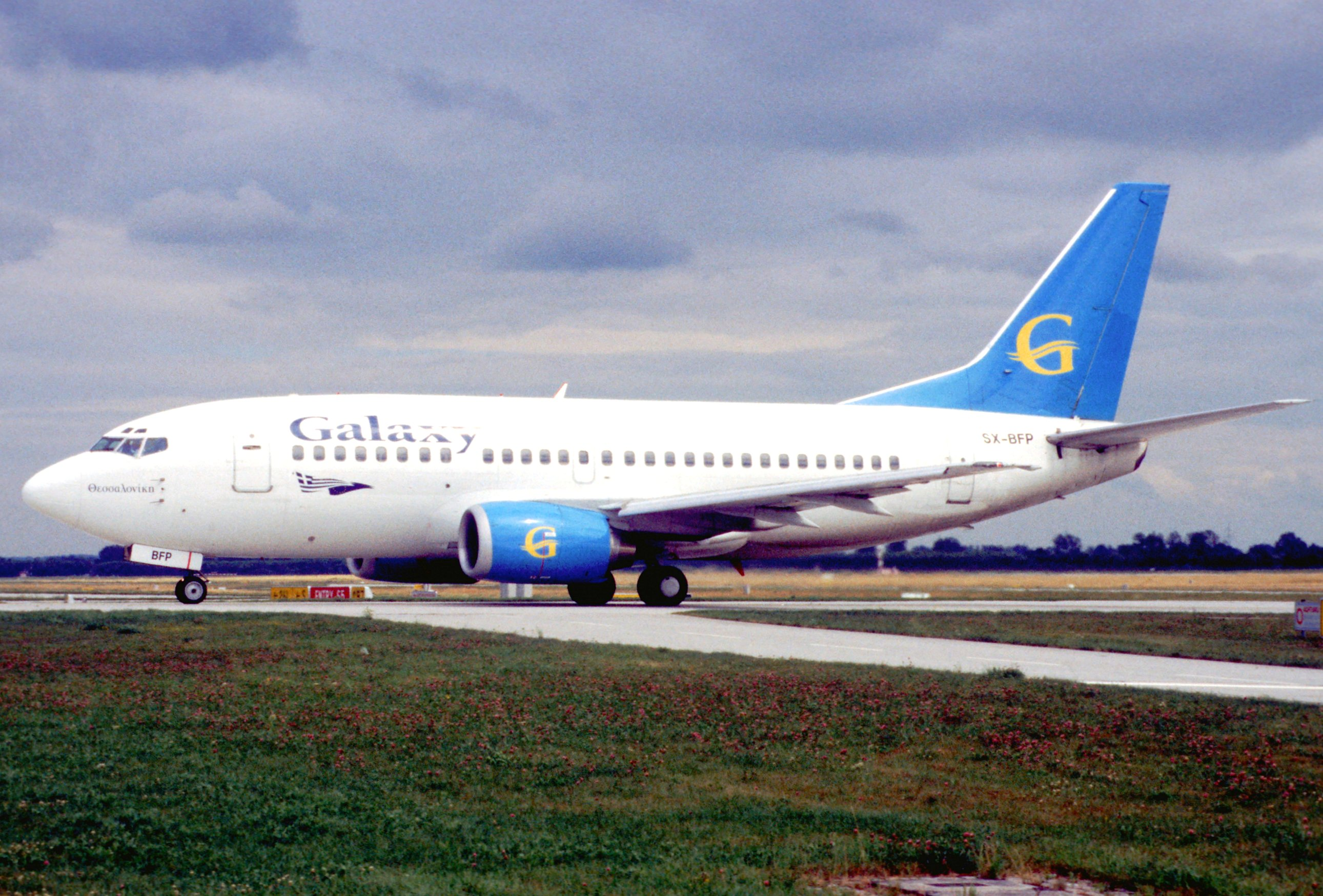
Galaxy Airways Boeing 737

1999

Company foundation year. Was founded by Capt. Theodore Kokmotos. Initial scheduled flights operation began immediately with a Boeing 737-500, between Thessaloniki and the three German cities, Düsseldorf, Stuttgart and Munich. The budget, as well as the assets of the company, was profitable.

2000

Galaxy Airways expands its fleet with two more Boeing 737s, (in total the fleet consists of 3 aircraft). Its flight network expands as well, between two smaller cities of Greece, Kavala and Preveza and four German cities Nuremberg, Berlin, Stuttgart, Düsseldorf. These cities were connecting for the first time with scheduled flights.

2001

New shareholders came in the company and the founder walked out from the company's management. Since then management was performed by the new shareholders. Galaxy Airways under its new management ends its scheduled flights and turns to charter flights only, targeting into an even more profitability. Company continued for two more years until the main stockholders decided to end their involvement with the airline business.
