= Gallaxy (musician) =

Ghanaian music duo

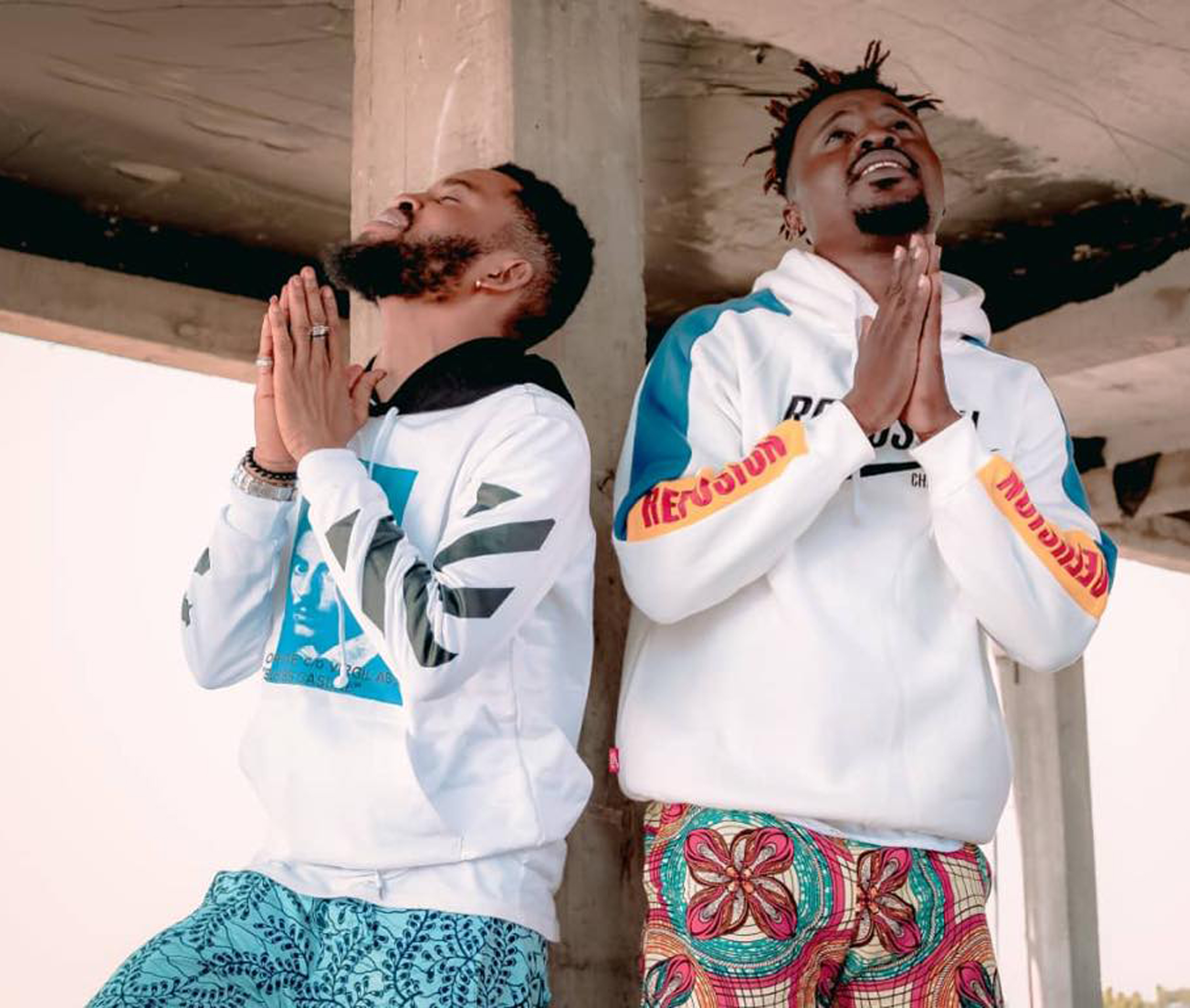
- A picture of Ghanaian music duo Gallaxy at a video shoot

Background information
- Birth name: Randsford Ohene; David Adjeiwoda
- Also known as: Bra Chiky & Kwesi Dav
- Born: 30 January 1986 (age 39); 10 November 1985 (age 39) Ashaiman, Ghana
- Origin: Ghana
- Genres: Afrobeats, hiplife, highlife
- Occupations: Recording artist, singer-songwriter, performer
- Years active: (2012–present)
- Labels: Harbour City Music, PC Mensah Records

Gallaxy is a Ghanaian hiplife and afrobeats duo from Ashaiman made up of Randsford Ohene (stage name Bra Chiky, born 30 January 1986) and David Adjeiwoda (stage name Kwesi Dav, born 10 November 1985). They were nominated for the 'Best group' in the maiden edition of the Ghana Entertainment Awards USA together with R2Bees, Keche and VVIP.

== Discography ==
- Boko Boko
- My Prayer ft Kofi Kinaata
- Papabi
- Qualities
- Dab ft Ene Yatt
- Wote Ati
- Chop Money ft Guru
- Wo Do Nti
- Highlife Agogo
- Gborgborvor ft Stonebwoy
