= Galaxian =

1979 video game

- Japanese arcade flyer
- Developer: Namco
- Publishers: JP: Namco; DE: ENV; NA: Midway Manufacturing; WW: Irem
- Designers: Kazunori Sawano; Shigeichi Ishimura
- Programmer: Kōichi Tashiro
- Artist: Hiroshi Ono
- Composer: Toshio Kai
- Series: Galaxian
- Platform: Arcade: Bally Astrocade, Atari 5200, Atari 8-bit, Atari 2600, IBM PC, Sharp MZ, PC-8801, ColecoVision, VIC-20, Apple II, Commodore 64, Famicom, MSX, Sharp X1, ZX Spectrum, Famicom Disk System, Game Boy, Sharp Zaurus, mobile phone
- Release: September 15, 1979: Arcade; JP: September 15, 1979; EU: November 1979; NA: February 1980 Astrocade; August 1981 5200; November 1982 Atari 8-bit; 1982 2600; May 1983 IBM PC; 1983 MZ, PC-8801; JP: 1983 ColecoVision, VIC-20; May 1984 Apple II; Mid-1984 C64; July 1984 Famicom; JP: September 7, 1984 MSX, X1; JP: 1984 ZX Spectrum; UK: 1984 Famicom Disk System; JP: July 20, 1990 Game Boy; JP: July 14, 1995; NA: September 1995; EU: 1995 Zaurus; JP: 2001 Mobile; WW: 2004
- Genre: Fixed shooter
- Modes: Single-player, multiplayer
- Arcade system: Namco Galaxian

Galaxian (Note: Japanese: ギャラクシアン, Hepburn: Gyarakushian) is a 1979 fixed shooter video game developed and published by Namco for arcades. It is the first game in the Galaxian series. The player assumes control of the starfighter Galaxip (Note: ギャラクシップ, Gyarakushippu) in its mission to protect Earth from waves of aliens. Gameplay involves destroying each formation of aliens, who dive down towards the player in an attempt to hit them.

Designed by company engineer Kazunori Sawano, Galaxian was Namco's response to Space Invaders, a similar space shooter released the previous year by rival developer Taito. Space Invaders was a sensation in Japan, and Namco wanted a game that could compete against it. Sawano strove to make the game simple and easy to understand. He was inspired by the space combat scenes in Star Wars, with enemies originally being in the shape of the film's TIE Fighters. Galaxian is one of the first video games to feature RGB color graphics, and the first to use a tile-based hardware system, which was capable of animated multi-color sprites as well as scrolling; the latter was limited to the starfield background while the game itself remained a fixed shooter.

Galaxian was Namco's first major arcade video game hit. It was the second highest-grossing arcade video game of 1979 and 1980 in Japan and the second highest-grossing of 1980 in the United States, where it became one of the best-selling arcade games of all time with 50,000 arcade units sold by 1982. The game was celebrated for its gameplay and use of true color graphics. In retrospect, it has gained fame for its historical importance and technological accomplishments as one of the most important in the golden age of arcade video games. Its success led to several sequels and reimaginings, most notably Galaga (1981), which surpassed it in popularity. Galaxian has also been ported to many home systems and is included in numerous Namco compilations.

== Gameplay ==
Aliens called "Galaga" diving toward the player's ship (arcade)

Galaxian is a space-themed fixed shooter video game. The player controls a starship called the "Galaxip", the objective being to clear each round of aliens. The enemies appear in formation towards the top of the screen, with two escort ships, labeled the "Galaxian Flagship" or "Galboss", which take a single shot to destroy. The aliens called "Galaga" will make a dive bomb towards the bottom of the screen while shooting projectiles in an attempt to hit the player. The "Galaxip" can only fire a single shot at a time, and the player must wait for it to either hit an enemy or the top of the screen before being able to fire another. The player loses a life when colliding with either an enemy or their projectile; the game ends when all lives are lost.

Galaxian Flagships will dive bomb with 2 red escort ships; shooting all 3 of these will award the player bonus points, with extra points awarded to the destruction of the flagship. Enemy movement will increase as the game progresses alongside the number of shots that the enemies shoot. Rounds are indicated by small flags at the bottom of the screen. The game's attract mode featured a short plot line, titled "WE ARE THE GALAXIANS. MISSION: DESTROY ALIENS".

== Development ==
Galaxian was designed by Kazunori Sawano, who had previously worked on many of Namco's electro-mechanical shooting gallery arcade games, notably Shoot Away (1977). Early in development, Taito had released Space Invaders in Japan, which swept the country by storm and helped turn the video game industry into a highly-profitable business. To help capitalize on the game's success, Namco president Masaya Nakamura ordered Sawano to make the best "post-Invaders" game they could, which put pressure on the development team. Although development of the game lasted six months, Sawano had made several ideas half a year before production began.

Sawano and his team set out to make a game anybody could play, using a "simple is best" motto during production; this helped trim away large-scale ideas in favor of a game that could loop endlessly and be able to use only two enemy types. Alongside Space Invaders, a large portion of the game was inspired by Star Wars, specifically its large-scale space battles. Sawano had wanted to replicate the feeling of a space battle, specifically with the sound effects. Several back-and-forth sound effects were made, many being rejected by Sawano for not matching his vision. The game was Namco's first arcade game to be composed with a synthesizer.

Game balance was an important part of the game, as Sawano did not want to make the game suddenly spike in difficulty with no build-up or warning; the development team made the number of enemies on-screen the same and gradually increased the difficulty as the player progresses, becoming more noticeable in later stages. The enemies themselves were designed to have a personality of their own, programmed to monitor the player's movements and make attacks based on them; early in development, Sawano had envisioned enemies resembling TIE Fighters from Star Wars. To save on hardware memory and processing, programmers created a tilemap hardware model, which created a set of 8×8 pixel tiles. This reduced processing and memory requirements up to 64 times, compared to the framebuffer model used in Space Invaders. The hardware is also capable of multicolor sprites, sprite animation, and scrolling, though the game remains a fixed shooter with a scrolling effect only used for the starfield background.

== Release ==
Galaxian was released by Namco in Japan on September 15, 1979. Following its large success, Namco approached Midway Manufacturing in terms of releasing the game overseas. Midway, who had previously lost their license with Taito due to the success of Space Invaders in the west, was in the midst of trying to find a new partner for releasing games. After Namco showed Midway the game on October 17, 1979, Midway was interested in the game's unique features and wanted to acquire the rights to the game. They agreed to the deal and Midway introduced the game at a trade exhibit in November 1979, followed by a wide release for North America in February 1980; this move helped strengthen Midway and challenged Atari's leadership in the market. To help keep up demand for the game in Japan, Namco licensed the game to other companies for manufacturing cabinets, including Taito and Irem.

=== Versions ===
In addition to allowing other companies to manufacture cabinets, Namco would also give them permission to release their own versions in an attempt to meet the game's overwhelming demand. One such was Moon Alien by Nichibutsu, a hack which only adds a title screen and slightly changes the sprites. A sequel to it would also be made, known as Moon Alien Part 2. It features an energy meter which kills the player if it fully depletes. Moon Alien became the subject of litigation when Nichibutsu created more boards than contractually permitted; Nichibutsu paid Namco the excess of the license fee as compensation. Nichibutsu later found success in emulating Galaxian's gameplay through Moon Cresta and its sequels.

Taito would also release T.T Spacian Part-2, which modifies the game to use the aliens from Space Invaders, making it an early example of a crossover in a video game.

=== Ports ===
Atari, Inc. published ports of Galaxian for its Atari 8-bit computers, Atari 2600, and Atari 5200 in 1982 and 1983, three or more years after Galaxian appeared in arcades and a year or more after Galaga. Additional ports were published under the Atarisoft label for the Apple II, ColecoVision, Commodore 64, VIC-20, IBM PC and ZX Spectrum. Ports from other companies were sold for MSX (Europe and Japan only), NEC PC-8801, Famicom (Japan only), and Sharp X1. A Bally Astrocade version was published under the name Galaxian, but the name of the port was later changed to Galactic Invasion.

Coleco released a stand-alone Mini-Arcade tabletop version of Galaxian in 1981, which, along with Pac-Man, Donkey Kong, and Frogger, sold three million units combined. Entex released a handheld electronic game called Galaxian 2 in 1981. The game is called Galaxian 2 because it has a two-player mode. It is not a sequel, as Entex did not previously develop any port of Galaxian.

== Reception ==
Reception

Review scores
Publication	Score
AllGame	2/5 (Atari 5200)
Computer and Video Games	15/20 (Atari VCS); 78% (Atari VCS)
Eurogamer	9/10 (Arcade)
Electronic Fun with Computers & Games	A (Atari 5200)
Video Games Player	B+ (Atari VCS)

Award
Publication	Award
The Guardian	Greatest video game of the 70s

Galaxian was a critical and commercial success upon release. In Japan, it was the second highest-earning arcade game of 1979, below Space Invaders. The following year, Galaxian outperformed Pac-Man for a while, before the year ended with Galaxian again being the second highest-earning arcade game of 1980, below Pac-Man. Galaxian was later the 18th highest-grossing arcade video game of 1981, tied with Defender and Turbo. The game continued to see success in Japan throughout the early 1980s; Game Machine reported that it was still performing well as late as August 1983.

In the United States, Galaxian was also the second highest-grossing arcade game of 1980, below Asteroids, according to Play Meter and Cash Box. Galaxian had sold 40,000 arcade units in the United States by 1981, and 50,000 units in the US as of 1982.

=== Reviews ===
Critics applauded the game's use of true color graphics and for improving the formula established in Space Invaders. The April 5, 1980 issue of Cashbox noted of the game's colorful and attractive cabinet design, while the April 26 issue called it an "earthshaking hit", referring to it as a true followup to Space Invaders. In a 2007 retrospective review, Sir Clive of Eurogamer labeled it a masterpiece, praising its "beautifully drawn" game graphics, intense gameplay, and for being a historically important game for the industry. In 2021, The Guardian listed Galaxian as the greatest video game of the 1970s. In 1996, GamesMaster ranked the arcade version 63 on their "Top 100 Games of All Time."

Home versions and ports of the game received mixed responses by platforms. Video magazine in 1982 reviewed the Astrocade version of Galaxian (named Galactic Invasion), noting that the graphics were inferior to the coin-op and PC versions, but praising the play-action as "magnificent" compared to other console versions. The Astrocade version was later awarded a Certificate of Merit for "Best Arcade-to-Home Video Game Translation" at the 4th annual Arkie Awards. Home Computing Weekly in 1983 gave the Spectrum version of Galaxian 3/5 stars describing it as a well-written version and praising the graphics as fast although flickery. Softline in 1983 criticized the Atari 8-bit version of the game, stating that "this game becomes tedious very quickly".

== Legacy ==
The Galaxian arcade hardware had a significant influence on the hardware design of Nintendo's later arcade and console systems, including the arcade hardware for Radar Scope (1980) and Donkey Kong (1981) as well as the Famicom and Nintendo Entertainment System. According to Nintendo R&D2 lead engineer Masayuki Uemura, Galaxian replaced the more intensive bitmap rendering system of Space Invaders with a hardware sprite rendering system that animated sprites over a scrolling background, allowing more detailed graphics, faster gameplay and a scrolling animated starfield background. This provided the basis for Nintendo's Radar Scope arcade hardware, which improved on Galaxian with technology such as high-speed emitter-coupled logic integrated circuit chips and memory on a 50 MHz printed circuit board. Following the commercial failure of Radar Scope, the game's arcade hardware was converted for use with Donkey Kong, which became a major arcade hit. Home systems at the time were not powerful enough to handle an accurate port of Donkey Kong, so Nintendo wanted to create a system that allowed a fully accurate conversion of Donkey Kong to be played in homes, leading to the development of the Famicom. The Galaxian Flagship appears as the 6th fruit in Pac-Man and has had a recurring appearance throughout the Pac-Man franchise. With Pac-Man's appearance in the Super Smash Bros. series, the Galaxian can be thrown by Pac-Man where it will fly in a shuttle loop and play sounds from the arcade game.

=== Sequels ===
Galaxian spawned a long series of sequels and spin-offs for multiple game platforms, including arcade hardware and home video game systems. The first of these, Galaga, was released in 1981, usurping the original in popularity as one of the greatest video games of all time, becoming a popular game during the golden age of arcade video games in North America. It was followed by Gaplus in 1984, which added power-up items and juggling-based bonus stages. Galaga '88 was released in 1987, published in North America by Atari Games, which featured branching level paths, new enemy types and multiple endings.

In 1990, Namco produced a theme-park attraction based on the series, Galaxian3: Project Dragoon. Originally presented at Expo '90 and moved to Namco's Wonder Eggs theme park two years later, it was a rail shooter where up to 28 players used lightguns to shoot down enemies and projectiles. A smaller version for arcades was released in 1992, followed by a 1996 PlayStation release in Japan and Europe. In 1995, an arcade remake of Galaga was released for the Namco Classic Collection Vol. 1 compilation, Galaga Arrangement. This game added two-player co-operative play and boss fights, alongside new enemy and weapon types. It was ported to the Xbox, PlayStation 2 and GameCube in 2002 as part of the compilation disk Namco Museum.

A Japan-only medal game spin-off, Galaxian Fever, was released in 2000 as part of Namco's Shooting Medal series. The following year, Hasbro Interactive released Galaga: Destination Earth for the PlayStation and Game Boy Color, adding side-scrolling and third-person stages to the core gameplay. The 2005 PlayStation Portable compilation Namco Museum Battle Collection includes a remake of Galaga titled Galaga Arrangement, having no relation to the one featured in Namco Classic Collection Vol. 1. This game was later ported to iOS devices in 2009, renamed Galaga Remix. In 2008, Namco Bandai Games released a downloadable game for the Xbox 360 and PlayStation 3, Galaga Legions – this game was instead a twin-stick shooter game with score attack modes and multiple stages. It was followed by a 2011 sequel, Galaga Legions DX, branded under the now-defunct Namco Generations label.

=== Re-releases ===
Galaxian is included in the Namco Museum series of collections across several platforms. Ports of Galaxian and Galaga for the Game Boy were released by Nintendo as Arcade Classic 3. Galaxian was released on Microsoft Windows in 1995 as part of Microsoft Return of Arcade. The game was also released as part of the Pac-Man's Arcade Party 30th Anniversary arcade machine. The game has also been seen in Jakks Pacific's "Plug It In & Play" TV game controllers. Galaxian, along with Galaga, Gaplus, and Galaga '88, was "redesigned and modernized" for an iPhone app compilation called the Galaga 30th Anniversary Collection, released in commemoration of the event by Namco Bandai. Super Impulse also released a stand-alone Tiny Arcade version of Galaxian.

=== High scores ===
The Galaxian world record has been the focus of many competitive gamers since its release. The most famous Galaxian rivalry has been between British player Gary Whelan and American Perry Rodgers, who faced off at Apollo Amusements in Pompano Beach, Florida, US, on April 6 to 9, 2006. Whelan held the world record with 1,114,550 points, until beaten by newcomer Aart van Vliet, of the Netherlands, who scored 1,653,270 points on 27 May 2009 at the Funspot Family Fun Center in Weirs Beach, New Hampshire, US. The record has since been raised to 2,010,000 points, set on May 20, 2016 by David Lyne and verified by Twin Galaxies on May 28, 2016.
