= List of Galaxian video games =

Galaxian
- Genre: Shoot 'em up
- Developers: Namco; Bandai Namco Studios
- Publishers: Namco; Bandai Namco Entertainment
- Creator: Kazunori Sawano
- Platform: List: Arcade, Atari 2600, Atari 5200, Atari 8-bit, VIC-20, Family Computer, MSX, Commodore 64, NES, Atari 7800, Famicom Disk System, TurboGrafx-16, Game Gear, PlayStation, MS-DOS, Game Boy, Mobile phone, Game Boy Color, LCD game, PlayStation Portable, Xbox 360, PlayStation 3, Windows Phone, iOS, Vita, Android, Xbox One, PlayStation 4
- First release: Galaxian; November 1979
- Latest release: Galaga Revenge; January 2019

Galaxian (Note: Japanese: ギャラクシアン, Hepburn: Gyarakushian) is a shoot 'em up video game franchise developed and published by Bandai Namco Entertainment, formerly Namco. Some entries were outsourced to other developers, such as Hasbro Interactive, Bandai and Paladin Studios. The series first began in 1979 with the arcade game Galaxian, which was Namco's first major hit in the video game industry, seeing ports for multiple home consoles, handheld systems and mobile phones. Most games in the series have been fixed shooters, although some have delved into other genres such as rail shooters and twin-stick shooters. Entries in the franchise have been ported to several home consoles and included in many Namco video game compilations for multiple platforms. Galaxian is one of the most successful arcade games of its time, selling over 50,000 arcade cabinets in North America alone.

Galaxian and its sequel Galaga are cited as some of the most influential games of the genre, the latter being called one of the greatest video games ever made by many publications. Later entries in the series have been met with a more mixed reception — some, such as Galaga Legions and its DX update, have been praised for expanding upon the gameplay in earlier titles, while others, such as Galaga: Destination Earth, were criticized for being poor updates of the original. The success of the series has lend itself to other forms of media, including soundtrack CDs, apparel, garage kits and literature. Including re-releases, the Galaxian franchise has sold over 12 million copies, making it one of Bandai Namco's best-selling franchises of all time. (Note: Galaxian series: Galaxian3 sales: 66,770 units (JP); SD Gundam: Over Galaxian sales: 27,905 (JP); Namco Museum Vol. 1 sales: 1.65 million units (US), 167,786 units (JP); Namco Museum Vol. 3 sales: 2.24 million units (US), 148,758 units (JP); Namco Museum 64 sales: 1.04 million units; Namco Museum (GBA) sales: 2.96 million units; Namco Museum (PS2) sales: ≈1.80 million units; Namco Museum Battle Collection sales: 79,527 units (JP); Namco Museum Vol. 2 (PSP) sales: 24,934 units (JP); Namco Museum DS sales: 33,393 units (JP); Namco Museum Virtual Arcade sales: 5,912 units (JP); Namco Arcade downloads: 2 million; Pac-Man & Galaga Dimensions sales: 10,785 units (JP))

== Arcade games ==
Game	Details
Galaxian Original release date(s): JP: November 1979; NA: April 5, 1980	Release years by system: 1979 – Arcade (Namco Galaxian); 1982 – Atari 8-bit, tabletop LCD game 1983 – Atari 2600, Atari 5200, VIC-20; 1984 – Family Computer, MSX; 1990 – Famicom Disk System; 1995 – Game Boy (Galaga & Galaxian); 1997 – LCD pocket game 2001 – Mobile phone 2009 – Wii Virtual Console
Galaxian Original release date(s): JP: November 1979; NA: April 5, 1980	Notes: Designed by Kazunori Sawano; Distributed in North America by Midway Games; Cited as one of the first video games to use RGB, through its colorful enemy designs and explosions; One of the most successful video games of its time; Sold 50,000 arcade cabinets in North America by 1982; The tabletop unit was produced by Coleco, selling over one million units; The LCD game was produced by Bandai as part of their MameGame series
Galaga Original release date(s): JP: September 1981; NA: October 1981	Release years by system: 1981 – Arcade (Namco Galaga); 1984 – Family Computer, MSX; 1987 – Nintendo Entertainment System, Atari 7800; 1990 – Famicom Disk System; 1995 – Game Boy (Galaga & Galaxian); 2007 – Xbox 360; 2009 – Wii Virtual Console; 2011 – Roku; 2013 – 3DS Virtual Console, Wii U Virtual Console; 2016 – PlayStation 4, Xbox One, PC
Galaga Original release date(s): JP: September 1981; NA: October 1981	Notes: Designed by Shigeru Yokoyama; Distributed in North America by Midway Games; Listed by several publications as one of the greatest video games of all time; One of the most popular titles during the golden age of arcade video games; The SG-1000 conversion was developed by Sega and titled Sega-Galaga
Gaplus Original release date(s): JP: April 1984; NA: October 1984	Release years by system: 1984 – Arcade (Namco Phozon); 1987 – Commodore 64; 2007 – Mobile phone 2009 – Wii Virtual Console; 2020 – Nintendo Entertainment System
Gaplus Original release date(s): JP: April 1984; NA: October 1984	Notes: Distributed in North America by Midway Games; A conversion kit was released that renamed it to Galaga 3; One of the first games released for the Wii Virtual Console Arcade, alongside Star Force, Mappy and The Tower of Druaga
Galaga '88 Original release date(s): JP: December 1987; NA: 1988	Release years by system: 1987 – Arcade (Namco System 1); 1988 – PC-Engine; 1990 – TurboGrafx-16, X68000; 1991 – Game Gear; 2008 – Mobile phone 2009 – Wii Virtual Console; 2011 – PlayStation 3, PlayStation Vita
Galaga '88 Original release date(s): JP: December 1987; NA: 1988	Notes: Distributed in North America by Atari Games; The TurboGrafx-16 version is named Galaga '90 in North America; The Game Gear handheld port is named Galaga '91 in Japan and North America, and Galaga 2 in Europe
Galaxian3: Project Dragoon Original release date(s): JP: April 1, 1990; WW: 1992	Release years by system: 1990 – Attraction; 1992 – Arcade (Namco Theater 6); 1996 – PlayStation; 2013 – PlayStation 3, PlayStation Vita
Galaxian3: Project Dragoon Original release date(s): JP: April 1, 1990; WW: 1992	Notes: Originally built as a theme park attraction for Expo '90, later moved to Namco's Wonder Eggs park in 1992; 3D rail shooter that supported up to 28 players; A port for 3DO was announced in 1994 but never released
Attack of the Zolgear Original release date(s): WW: 1994	Release years by system: 1994 – Arcade (Namco Theater 6)
Attack of the Zolgear Original release date(s): WW: 1994	Notes: Sequel to Galaxian3: Project Dragoon; Released as a conversion kit for the arcade version
Galaga Arrangement Original release date(s): JP: November 1995; NA: 1995	Release years by system: 1995 – Arcade (Namco ND-1)
Galaga Arrangement Original release date(s): JP: November 1995; NA: 1995	Notes: Released as part of the compilation Namco Classic Collection Vol. 1; Remake of Galaga with two-player co-op and power-up items; Later released for the Namco Museum compilation on PlayStation 2, Xbox and GameCube in 2001
Galaxian Fever Original release date(s): JP: July 14, 2000	Release years by system: 2000 – Arcade
Galaxian Fever Original release date(s): JP: July 14, 2000	Notes: Medal game released in Japan; Part of Namco's Shooting Medal series; Players used an attached gun to shoot coins at on-screen targets
Galaga Assault Original release date(s): WW: February 12, 2016	Release years by system: 2016 – Arcade
Galaga Assault Original release date(s): WW: February 12, 2016	Notes: Developed by Raw Thrills; Published by Bandai Namco Amusements and Raw Thrills; HD reimagining of the original Galaga
Mass Destruction VR Shooting: Galaga Fever Original release date(s): JP: March 6, 2018	Release years by system: 2018 – Arcade
Mass Destruction VR Shooting: Galaga Fever Original release date(s): JP: March 6, 2018	Notes: Virtual-reality adaptation of Galaga; Released for Bandai Namco's "VR Zone" arcade centers

== Home console and handheld games ==
Game	Details
Galaga & Galaxian Original release date(s): JP: July 14, 1995; NA: June 26, 1996	Release years by system: 1995 – Game Boy
Galaga & Galaxian Original release date(s): JP: July 14, 1995; NA: June 26, 1996	Notes: Includes ports of Galaxian and Galaga; Published in North America by Nintendo; Features support for the Super Game Boy
The Rising of Gourb Original release date(s): JP: April 4, 1996; EU: 1996	Release years by system: 1996 – PlayStation
The Rising of Gourb Original release date(s): JP: April 4, 1996; EU: 1996	Notes: Second sequel to Galaxian3; Released as a bonus game in the PlayStation conversion of Galaxian3
SD Gundam: Over Galaxian Original release date(s): JP: June 28, 1996	Release years by system: 1996 – PlayStation
SD Gundam: Over Galaxian Original release date(s): JP: June 28, 1996	Notes: 3D remake of Galaxian using characters from the Gundam series; Developed and published by Bandai
Galaga: Destination Earth Original release date(s): NA: September 2000	Release years by system: 2000 – PlayStation, PC, Game Boy Color
Galaga: Destination Earth Original release date(s): NA: September 2000	Notes: Published by Hasbro Interactive; Features third-person and side-scrolling stages alongside a typical top-down view; The Game Boy Color version features the standard Galaga gameplay with scrolling backgrounds
Galaga Arrangement Original release date(s): JP: February 24, 2005; NA: August 23, 2005; EU: December 9, 2005	Release years by system: 2005 – PlayStation Portable
Galaga Arrangement Original release date(s): JP: February 24, 2005; NA: August 23, 2005; EU: December 9, 2005	Notes: Remake of Galaga with power-up items and boss fights; Released as part of Namco Museum Battle Collection; Included in Namco Museum Virtual Arcade for the Xbox 360; Not to be confused with the Galaga Arrangement found in Namco Classic Collection Vol. 1
Galaga Legions Original release date(s): WW: August 20, 2008	Release years by system: 2008 – Xbox 360, PlayStation 3
Galaga Legions Original release date(s): WW: August 20, 2008	Notes: Directed by Tadashi Iguchi; Twin-stick shooter game focusing on score attack; Included in the 2011 Nintendo 3DS compilation Pac-Man & Galaga Dimensions
Galaga Legions DX Original release date(s): WW: June 29, 2011	Release years by system: 2011 – Xbox 360, PlayStation 3; 2012 – Windows Phone
Galaga Legions DX Original release date(s): WW: June 29, 2011	Notes: Directed by Tadashi Iguchi; Direct sequel to Galaga Legions; One of only two games published under the Namco Generations label, the other being Pac-Man Championship Edition DX

== Mobile games ==
Game	Details
Galaxian Mini Original release date(s): WW: 2002	Release years by system: 2000 – Mobile phone
Galaxian Mini Original release date(s): WW: 2002	Notes: "Miniature" remake of Galaxian; Gameplay involves shooting down small formations of diving enemies
Galaga Remix Original release date(s): WW: March 31, 2009	Release years by system: 2009 – iOS
Galaga Remix Original release date(s): WW: March 31, 2009	Notes: Features ports of Galaga and the PSP Galaga Arrangement; Delisted from the App Store on March 31, 2015
Galaga 30th Collection Original release date(s): WW: July 3, 2011	Release years by system: 2011 – iOS
Galaga 30th Collection Original release date(s): WW: July 3, 2011	Notes: Includes remakes of Galaxian, Galaga, Gaplus and Galaga '88; Made to celebrate the franchise's 30th anniversary.
Galaga Kai Original release date(s): JP: November 1, 2011	Release years by system: 2011 – Mobile phone
Galaga Kai Original release date(s): JP: November 1, 2011	Notes: Mobile phone remake of Galaga exclusive to Japan; Features stages based on other Namco properties, such as Pac-Man, Xevious and Mappy
Galaga: Special Edition Original release date(s): NA: 2012	Release years by system: 2012 – Android
Galaga: Special Edition Original release date(s): NA: 2012	Notes: Modern remake of Galaga; Also known as Galaga X
Space Galaga Original release date(s): JP: April 29, 2014; NA: June 16, 2015	Release years by system: 2014 – iOS
Space Galaga Original release date(s): JP: April 29, 2014; NA: June 16, 2015	Notes: Based on the anime series Space Dandy; The North American release is titled Space Galaga International Edition; Later rebranded as Super Space Galaga
Galaga Wars Original release date(s): WW: November 1, 2016	Release years by system: 2016 – iOS
Galaga Wars Original release date(s): WW: November 1, 2016	Notes: Developed by Paladin Studios; Features ships from other Namco video games, including Starblade and Xevious; An updated version, Galaga Wars+ is coming exclusively to Apple Arcade

== Other titles ==
Game	Details
Gorf Original release date(s): NA: February 1981; EU: 1981	Release years by system: 1981 – Arcade (Bally Astrocade); 1982 – Atari 2600, VIC-20; 1983 – Atari 5200
Gorf Original release date(s): NA: February 1981; EU: 1981	Notes: Developed and published by Midway Games; Features a stage based on Galaxian, which was removed from all home releases due to copyright issues
Galaxian 2 Original release date(s): NA: 1981	Release years by system: 1981 – Handheld game
Galaxian 2 Original release date(s): NA: 1981	Notes: Handheld developed by Entex Industries; Named after its multiplayer gameplay
Cosmo Gang the Video Original release date(s): JP: March 1992; NA: April 1992	Release years by system: 1992 – Arcade (Namco System 2), Super Famicom; 2009 – Wii Virtual Console
Cosmo Gang the Video Original release date(s): JP: March 1992; NA: April 1992	Notes: Galaxian-inspired parody game; Features characters from a 1990 redemption arcade game
Galaxian Heroes Original release date(s): WW: Unreleased	Release years by system:
Galaxian Heroes Original release date(s): WW: Unreleased	Notes: Was being developed by Project Aces, known for creating the Ace Combat series; First teased on March 11, 2015; Development is being kept secret
