= Galaga '88 =

1987 video game

- Japanese arcade flyer
- Developer: Namco
- Publishers: JP: Namco; NA/EU: Atari Games
- Composer: Hiroyuki Kawada
- Series: Galaxian
- Platforms: Arcade, PC Engine/TurboGrafx-16, X68000, mobile phone
- Release: December 1987: Arcade; JP: December 1987; EU: January 1988; NA: April 1988 PC Engine/TurboGrafx-16; JP: July 15, 1988; NA: November 1989 X68000; JP: 1989 Mobile i-Mode; JP: 2007 EZweb; JP: February 28, 2008
- Genre: Fixed shooter
- Modes: Single-player, multiplayer
- Arcade system: Namco System 1

Galaga '88 (Note: Japanese: ギャラガ'88, Hepburn: Gyaraga Eiti Eito) is a 1987 fixed shooter video game developed and published by Namco for arcades. It was released in North America and Europe by Atari Games. It is the fourth entry in the Galaxian series, following 1984's Gaplus, and a sequel to 1981's Galaga. It features significantly improved graphics over previous games in the series, including detailed backgrounds, larger enemies, and greater ship details.

Galaga '88 was a commercial success in Japan, but was not as successful as its predecessors outside of Japan. The game was praised by critics for its gameplay, graphics, and music, as well as for its new enhancements that changed and innovated the core gameplay. It was ported to the TurboGrafx-16, X68000, and Japanese mobile phones, and is included in several Namco compilations. It was followed by Galaxian3: Project Dragoon in 1990.

== Gameplay ==
Arcade screenshot

Galaga '88 is a fixed shooter video game. Its plot involves the launch of a starship named the Blast Fighter to destroy the hostile Galaga forces and their home planet. Its gameplay is similar to its predecessors, Galaxian, Galaga, and Gaplus, as the Blast Fighter, the player must shoot each of the Galaga aliens, who fly into formation from the top and sides of the playfield. The aliens will make an attempt to hit the player by divebombing towards the bottom of the screen. Colliding with an alien or their projectile results in a life being lost.

Atop each formation are 4 larger enemies known as the Boss Galaga, which take 2 hits to destroy. Like 1981's Galaga, these enemies can use a tractor beam to capture a player's ship, returning with it to the top of the screen. The player can reclaim the captured fighter by shooting a Boss Galaga holding one while it is divebombing. If they are successful, the captured fighter joins with the player's own to create a dual fighter that has additional firepower and a larger hitbox. A Boss Galaga can also capture a dual fighter; rescuing it in the same fashion instead creates a triple fighter, an even larger ship with wide, fast-moving shots. A triple fighter can also be acquired by finding pink-colored capsules.

Galaga '88 consists of five "worlds", each one containing up to four stages, including a bonus stage at the end. Each world gives the player a chance to acquire up to two blue warp capsules by defeating large enemies and destroying obstacles; completing a bonus stage with two capsules warps the player to the next dimension, in which enemies and formations are different and generally more difficult. There are additionally two vertical-scrolling stages featuring two enemy formations and a boss. The game features four different endings based on which dimension the player is in when they complete the game.

== Development ==
=== Music ===
The soundtrack for Galaga '88 was composed by Hiroyuki Kawada, a former game designer that created music for games such as Solvalou, Yokai Dochuki, and Valkyrie no Densetsu. Kawada expressed his admiration for its gameplay, and wanted the music and sound effects to convey a sense of entertainment instead of stoicism. For the Galactic Dancin stages, he created music that tapped into a wide variety of genres, like orchestra, tango, salsa, and big band jazz. Kawada based the idea off his "eclectic" taste in music, and wanted the soundtrack in Galaga '88 to reflect this. The music was created before the stages themselves were programmed; Kawada composed the tracks while the programmers choreographed the enemy movement to his music.

Since Galaga '88 utilized the System 1 hardware, Kawada was able to experiment with the board's sound channels: "I loved bringing together the richness of the timbres in FM synthesis, the wave table synthesis that played a crucial role in the Namco sound, and the PCM synthesis that was indispensable for those low resolution real sound effects. When they were all combined and their distinctive colors were used to the fullest, it was possible to create a wealth of musical variety to complement the classic traditional sounds of the Galaga series."

== Release ==
A prototype of Galaga '88 was demonstrated at the Japan Amusement Machine (JAMMA) trade show in October 1987, presented alongside Pac-Mania, Bravoman, and Assault. Namco released the game in Japan in December 1987. In Europe, the game made its debut at London's Amusement Trades Exhibition International (ATEI) in January 1988. The game was released in April 1988 in North America, and was published by Atari Games in North America and Europe as part of its licensing agreement with Namco America.

=== Ports and re-releases ===
A home conversion of Galaga '88 was released for the PC Engine in Japan on July 15, 1988. It was published by NEC for the console's North American counterpart, the TurboGrafx-16, in November 1989 under the name Galaga '90. Dempa released a version of Galaga '88 for the X68000 computer the same year. In addition to including a port of the original arcade game, the X68000 version features an additional game mode that replaces the Galaga aliens with characters from other classic Namco video games; this version has been retroactively named Galaga '88 Arrangement.

In 2007, Namco Bandai Games digitally re-released the TurboGrafx-16 version through the Wii Virtual Console, followed by the arcade version in Japan in 2009. Two Japanese mobile phone ports were produced; the first was for i-Mode, released in 2007, and the second for EZweb, released on February 28, 2008. In 2011, the PC Engine version was re-released for the PlayStation Network in Japan under the Game Archives series. Hamster Corporation released the arcade version as part of their Arcade Archives series for the Nintendo Switch and PlayStation 4 in April 2023.

Galaga '88 is included in the arcade compilations Namco Museum 50th Anniversary (2005), Namco Museum Virtual Arcade (2008), and Namco Museum Switch (2017). The 2011 iOS compilation Galaga 30th Collection includes remakes of '88 and its three arcade predecessors, utilizing enhanced visuals and audio, achievements, and support for Game Center. Galaga '88 is also featured in the arcade games Pac-Man’s Arcade Party (2010) and Pac-Man’s Pixel Bash (2019). The TurboGrafx-16 version is one of the included titles on the TurboGrafx-16 Mini by Konami in 2020.

== Reception ==
Reception

Review scores
Publication	Score	
Publication	Arcade	TurboGrafx-16
AllGame	4/5	4.5/5
Computer and Video Games		88%
Eurogamer		8/10
Famitsu		33/40
The Games Machine (UK)	Positive	

Awards
Publication	Award
Famitsu	Gold Hall of Fame
Gamest	28th Annual Hit Game

Galaga '88 proved successful in Japan, remaining in the top earning charts throughout most of the year. It was Japan's sixth highest-grossing arcade conversion kit of 1988. The game's simplicity and additions to the gameplay of its predecessors are cited as the reasons for its success and appeal in the country. It was largely unsuccessful in North America by comparison, with Atari having only sold a combined 986 arcade units and boards by the end of the year.

The game was well received by critics. Computer + Video Games liked its cute visuals and new additions to the core Galaga gameplay, while The Games Machine applauded its engaging and replayable gameplay and its soundtrack. Your Sinclair labeled it "one of the most enjoyable machines on offer this month". Advanced Computer Entertainment was more negative towards the game for being "nothing more than a prettified version of the original", although they praised its colorful, detailed visuals and soundtrack. Gamest magazine awarded it the 28th "Annual Hit Game" award in 1998 based on reader vote, citing that its "addictive" nature, colorful visuals and catchy music made Galaga '88 stand out among other games at the time.

In a 1998 retrospective review, Allgame was positive towards the game's graphics, branching level paths and overall improvements made over its predecessor. They also found the TurboGrafx-16 conversion to be a "killer port" for keeping the spirit of the original, going on to call it the best shooter released for the system. Reviewing the Wii Virtual Console digital re-release of the TurboGrafx port, Eurogamer found it to be a "pitch perfect dose of frenetic arcade blasting" for its triple fighter mechanic and branching stages, saying that it sets a good example for how to successfully remake a classic arcade game.
