= Gaplus =

1984 video game

- North American arcade flyer
- Developer: Namco
- Publishers: JP/EU: Namco; NA: Bally Midway; EU: Mastertronic (ports)
- Series: Galaxian
- Platforms: Arcade, PC-98, Commodore 64, mobile phone
- Release: April 1984: Arcade; JP: April 1984; NA: September 1984; EU: 1984 PC-98; JP: 1985 C64; 1988 Mobile; JP: January 25, 2007
- Genre: Fixed shooter
- Modes: Single-player, multiplayer
- Arcade system: Namco Phozon

Gaplus (Note: Japanese: ギャプラス, Hepburn: Gyapurasu) is a 1984 fixed shooter video game developed and published by Namco for arcades. It was released in North America by Bally Midway. It is the third game in the Galaxian series, serving as a direct sequel to Galaga (1981). In North America, a modification kit was later released to change the name to Galaga 3, possibly to reflect its position in the series. It was the only game other than Phozon to run on the Namco Phozon hardware. A contemporary home port for the Commodore 64 was released in 1988. A demake version of the game (in the style of Nintendo Entertainment System games) was included in Namco Museum Archives Vol. 2 as a bonus title. It was followed by Galaga '88 in 1987.

== Gameplay ==
The player's Ogre Header shooting down formations of enemies called "Galaga"

The objective of Gaplus is to score as many points as possible by defeating successive waves of enemies in levels called "Parsecs". Its core gameplay is very similar to its predecessors, Galaxian and Galaga: Enemies, called "Galaga", will fly onto the screen in rows and join a formation near the top, then begin attacking the player's ship Ogre Header with kamikaze-like dives. The ship can move left and right, as well as vertically. Bonus lives are earned at certain score intervals, and can also be gained by collecting ship parts dropped by some enemies, as well as collecting Rally-X bonus flags from shooting stars. The player loses a life when struck by an enemy or one of their shots; the game ends when all lives are lost.

Certain enemies when destroyed can drop upgrades that include a tractor beam which the player can use to capture enemies (like "Boss Galaga" aliens, first seen in 1981's Galaga, can use a tractor beam to capture the Fighter), a large drill that can destroy many enemies at once, powerups that temporarily slow down enemies or nullify their shots, and parts to create a new ship that awards an extra life when completed. Some stages begin with the star field reversing direction, with harder and faster waves of enemies appearing before resuming a normal formation.

The game features bonus "Challenging Stages" just as the previous game, Galaga did. However, instead of defeating a certain number of enemies, the objective of the challenging stage in Gaplus is to juggle enemies (3rd race Zako) by hitting them as many times as possible. Each hit grants a dot (represented by a bee) in a word or phrase, with extra hits adding to horizontal lines above and below the word. Spelling the entire word or phrase will earn a bonus related to that phrase, and each hit scores bonus points at the end of the round.

== Reception ==
In Japan, Game Machine listed Gaplus as the most successful table arcade unit of May 1984.

== Legacy ==
The arcade version of Gaplus was released for mobile phones on January 25, 2007, and is also part of Namco Museum Remix (2007) and Namco Museum Megamix (2010) for the Wii with its original title being used. The original version was later re-released under its original name for the Wii Virtual Console on March 25, 2009. In 2011, Gaplus was released for iOS devices as part of Galaga 30th Collection, featuring updated visuals, sound, and achievements. It was later re-released as a standalone digital-download title via the Arcade Archives series for the PlayStation 4 and Nintendo Switch in 2022 by Hamster Corporation (who acquired a catalog of IPs by Nichibutsu, UPL, NMK and Video System).

In 2020, Bandai Namco released a demake version of Gaplus as a bonus game in the Namco Museum Archives Vol. 2 compilation. Developed by M2, this game is a NES-rom running in an emulator, similar to the NES-style remake of Pac-Man Championship Edition in Vol. 1, and has been found to function on NES hardware (if extracted from the compilation and loaded from a flash cartridge) as well.
