= Galaga =

1981 video game

- Japanese arcade flyer
- Developer: Namco
- Publishers: JP/EU: Namco; NA: Midway Manufacturing
- Director: Shigeru Yokoyama
- Programmer: Toru (Tetsu) Ogawa
- Artist: Hiroshi Ono
- Composer: Nobuyuki Ohnogi
- Series: Galaxian
- Platform: Arcade: SG-1000, MSX, NES, PC-98, Atari 7800, Sord M5, Famicom Disk System, Game Boy, mobile phone
- Release: September 1981: Arcade; JP: September 1981; NA: November 1981; EU: 1981 SG-1000; JP: November 1983 MSX; JP: 1984 NES; JP: February 15, 1985; NA: September 1988; PAL: July 4, 1989 7800; August 1986 M5; JP: 1986 Famicom Disk System; JP: June 22, 1990 Game Boy; JP: July 14, 1995; NA: September 1995; EU: 1995 Mobile; JP: June 11, 2001
- Genre: Fixed shooter
- Modes: Single-player, multiplayer
- Arcade system: Namco Galaga

Galaga (Note: Japanese: ギャラガ, Hepburn: Gyaraga) is a 1981 fixed shooter video game developed and published by Namco for arcades. It was released by Midway Manufacturing in North America. It is the sequel to 1979's Galaxian, and the second game in the Galaxian series. Controlling a starship, the player is tasked with destroying the Galaga forces in each stage while avoiding enemies and projectiles. "Boss Galaga" enemies can capture a player's ship via a tractor beam, which can be rescued by another ship to give the player a "dual fighter" with additional firepower.

Shigeru Yokoyama led development with a small team. Initial planning took about two months to finish. Originally developed for the Namco Galaxian arcade board, it was instead shifted to a new system as suggested by Namco's Research and Development division. Inspiration for the dual fighter mechanic was taken from a film that Yokoyama had seen prior to development, in which a ship was captured using a large circular beam. The project became immensely popular around the company, with Namco's president Masaya Nakamura even taking interest.

Although early location tests were unsuccessful, Galaga went on to become one of the most successful titles of the golden age of arcade video games, routinely appearing on Japanese and American arcade charts through 1987. It was acclaimed by critics for its engaging gameplay and for its improvements made over its predecessor, and is widely regarded as one of the greatest video games of all time. Several home ports were released for a multitude of platforms, including the MSX, Atari 7800, and NES, alongside releases on digital distribution platforms such as Xbox Live Arcade and appearances in many Namco compilations. It was followed by Gaplus in 1984.

== Gameplay ==
Gameplay of the player exchanging shots with aliens in formation.

Galaga is a fixed shooter. The player controls Gyaraga at the bottom of the screen, which must prevent the Galaga forces from destroying all of mankind. The objective of each stage is to defeat all of the Galaga aliens, which will fly into formation from the top and sides of the screen. Similar to the previous game, Galaxian, aliens known as the "Galaga" will dive towards the player while shooting down projectiles; colliding with either projectiles or aliens will result in a life being lost.

Atop the enemy formation are 4 large fly-like aliens known as the "Boss Galaga", which take double shots to destroy (like "Galaxian Flagships" first seen in 1979's Galaxian, which take a single shot to destroy). These enemies can use a tractor beam to capture the player's ship, returning with it to the top of the formation and costing the player a life. Should additional lives remain, the player has an opportunity to shoot down the Boss Galaga holding the captured Fighter. Shooting them down as they dive towards the player will result in the captured Fighter being rescued, and it will join the player's ship, transforming it into a "dual-fighter" with additional firepower and a larger hitbox. However, destroying the Boss Galaga with the captured Fighter while it is in formation will instead cause it to turn against the player and act as an enemy. The Fighter will return in a later level as part of the formation.

Some enemies have the ability to morph into new enemy types with different attack patterns, including the Galaxian Flagship from Galaxian and the Midori (which resembles the Spy Ship enemies from Bosconian). Stages are indicated by emblems at the bottom-right of the screen. Enemies can become more aggressive as the game progresses, increasing their number of projectiles and diving down at a faster rate. The third stage and every 4th thereafter is a bonus stage, where the aliens fly in a preset formation without firing at the player.

== Bug ==
In the original arcade version, if a player completes stage 255 (the maximum unsigned 8 bit integer), the next stage would be announced as stage zero, and depending on the dip switches on the arcade, the game resets, plays levels incorrectly, locks up, or plays at the wrong difficulty. This is known as a kill screen.

== Development ==
Galaga was created by Japanese developer Shigeru Yokoyama, a long-time veteran of Namco. Namco's first big video game hit in arcades was Galaxian (1979); the game's success led Namco to produce a large number of Namco Galaxian arcade boards to keep up with demand. By the early 1980s the game was becoming harder to sell, so to help clear out inventory, Yokoyama was tasked with creating two new games that could run on the Namco Galaxian board. The first of these was King & Balloon (1980), a fixed shooter that is cited as the first video game to incorporate speech. The second game was instead made for newer hardware as suggested by Namco's Research & Development division. This new arcade board was named the Namco Galaga and was used in games including Bosconian (1981) and Dig Dug (1982). Although Yokoyama was not given explicit instructions to make a shooting game, management expressed desire for him to make a game similar to Galaxian. Initial planning for the project took two months.

The idea for the dual fighter stemmed from Yokoyama wanting to create enemies with different attack styles. The tractor beam emitted by the Boss Galaga was inspired by a film in which a character's ship was captured by a circling laser. Yokoyama incorporated this idea into Galaga, whereby an enemy could capture the player's ship with a beam and the ship would need to be rescued. Originally, rescuing a captured ship would award the player an extra life, but this was soon changed to having it fight alongside the player. This idea proved to be a problem at first; due to hardware limitations, the game could only display a limited number of sprites, resulting in the dual-fighter being unable to shoot any more missiles. As a workaround, Yokoyama made a 16x16 sprite for the ship and a 16x16 sprite for the bullets, reducing the total sprite count by two.

Inspired by the intermissions in Pac-Man (1980) and bonus stages in Rally-X (1980), Yokoyama added a special bonus level. While planning, lead programmer Tetsu Ogawa informed him of a bug whereby enemies would simply fly off the screen instead of moving into formation. Ogawa expressed interest in incorporating the idea into the game, leading to the inclusion of the Challenging Stages. Enemies originally flew in one type of pattern, with more being added to increase replay value. Graphic designer Hiroshi Ono designed many of the sprites, including the player's ship and the Boss Galaga alien.

Prior to location testing, the team focused on designing the instruction card, a sheet of paper that showed how the game was played. The text was done by the planners, while the actual design was handled by a graphic artist. The card originally showed the control layout and the basics of the game, which was stripped early on for being too boring. Yokoyama suggested that the card instead show off the dual fighter mechanic, as a means to draw in players. The team kept bringing in designs to Namco president Masaya Nakamura, who continued to reject them until he ordered the team to simply make it in front of him.

The team was allowed to set their own deadlines, due to Namco's then-laidback corporate structure. Feedback on the project was given by Nakamura and other employees, including Pac-Man creator Toru Iwatani. Despite the game's immense popularity around the company, early location tests failed to meet expectations due to players being able to progress a long way with only one coin, thus generating low income. Although Yokoyama stated that the game's popularity could still generate income, Namco executives instructed the team to increase the difficulty level. Galaga was released in Japan in September 1981; Midway Manufacturing, who had previously licensed Galaxian, released the game in North America in November of that year.

== Ports and re-releases ==
A port to the SG-1000, Sega-Galaga,was developed and released by Sega in 1983. An MSX version followed in 1984. A conversion for the Family Computer was released in 1985 in Japan, which was later released internationally by Bandai for the Nintendo Entertainment System, subtitled Demons of Death in North America. Atari Corporation released a version for the Atari 7800 in 1986 as one of the console's thirteen launch games. In Europe, Aardvark Software released an unofficial port for the BBC Micro and Acorn Electron called Zalaga in 1983 which was described by Computer and Video Games as "true to the arcade original".

Namco developed and released a Game Boy version in Japan in 1995, which was bundled with Galaxian. Nintendo published the game outside Japan under the Arcade Classic brand. Two mobile phone versions were released, both confined to Japan; the first was for i-Mode in 2001, and the second for EZweb in 2006. The original arcade version was released for the Xbox Live Arcade service in 2006, featuring online leaderboards and achievements. The NES release was ported to the Wii's Virtual Console in 2007, followed by the arcade version in 2009. A Roku port was published in 2011. In 2013, the NES version was released on both the Nintendo 3DS and Wii U's Virtual Console. Galaga was one of the four games released under the Arcade Game Series brand, which was published for the PlayStation 4, Windows and Xbox One in 2016. Hamster Corporation released the arcade version as part of their Arcade Archives series for the Nintendo Switch and PlayStation 4 in January 2023.

Galaga was included in Namco compilations including Namco Museum Vol. 1 (1995), Namco Museum 64 (1996), Namco Museum 50th Anniversary (2005), Namco Museum Virtual Arcade (2008), Namco Museum Essentials (2009), and Namco Museum Megamix (2010). The 2010 Wii game Pac-Man Party and its 2011 Nintendo 3DS version include Galaga as an extra, alongside the arcade versions of Dig Dug and Pac-Man. In celebration of the game's 30th anniversary in 2011, a high-definition remake was released for iOS devices as part of Galaga 30th Collection, which also included remakes of Galaxian, Gaplus and Galaga '88. Alongside the Xbox 360 and PlayStation 3 sequel Galaga Legions, it was ported to the Nintendo 3DS in 2011 as part of Pac-Man & Galaga Dimensions. The original version was also added to the iOS Namco Arcade compilation in 2012. The NES release is one of 30 games included in the NES Classic Edition.

== Other Platforms ==
In 2017, Jason Aldred recreated Galaga on the Commodore 64 under the title of Galencia. Galaga was ported to the Commodore 64 in 2022 by Arlagames who also included the source code for their work. In August of 2026, Milasoft released a clone named Hive Dive for the Commodore PET and Vic-20.

== Reception ==
Reception

Review scores
Publication	Score					
Publication	3DS	Arcade	Game Boy	NES	Wii	Xbox 360
AllGame		5/5		2.5/5	5/5	4/5
Computer and Video Games		Positive				
Eurogamer						5/10
Famitsu			7/10, 6/10, 5/10, 6/10			
GameSpot						6.5/10
GameSpy				8/10		
IGN					7.5/10	
Joystick				80%		
Nintendo Life	7/10					
Electric Playground			8/10			

Galaga was met with acclaim, with many applauding the engaging gameplay, structure, innovation and improvements over its predecessor, and was a popular game during the golden age of arcade video games. In Japan, it was the sixth highest-grossing arcade game of 1981, then the third highest-grossing arcade game of 1982, and then the ninth highest-grossing table arcade cabinet of 1986. In North America, it regularly appeared on the monthly sales chart of RePlay magazine from April 1980 to April 1987, being only outdone by Sega's Monaco GP (1979). Galaga was among the top ten highest-grossing arcade games of 1983 in the United States.

Computer + Video Games praised the challenge and improvements made over Galaxian, while Arcade Express selected it as an "Honorable Mention" in their 1983 arcade awards. Japanese publication Amusement Life said that the sense of thrill and fast-paced action made Galaga a "must play", while also praising its unique dual-fighter mechanic and colorful graphics. Vidiot magazine listed it as the seventh best arcade game of 1983, saying that its gameplay variety, dual-fighter mechanic and bonus stages made it stick out from the crowd.

In a 1998 retrospective review, AllGame said the strategy stood out amongst other games of its type, describing the gameplay as "perfectly balanced shooting action." Reviewing the NES home version, GameSpy called Galaga a "must play for arcade freaks", praising the port's accurate representation of the arcade version in terms of its graphics, sound effects and gameplay. IGN also praised the NES port's element of strategy within the dual-fighter mechanic and engaging gameplay. GameSpot, in their review for the Xbox 360 release, stated the gameplay was "as tricky as it ever was", praising the inclusion of online leaderboards and for being a faithful arcade conversion. Eurogamer agreed, citing that the leaderboards add to "addictiveness".

Ports of Galaga received praise for their faithfulness to the arcade original. Nintendo Life praised the 3DS Virtual Console port of the NES version for remaining accurate to the original, stating that it "aged surprisingly well" and was worth revisiting. Games magazine praised the improvements over games such as Space Invaders and Galaxian, commenting that Galaga still holds up years later. Joystick magazine praised the NES version's accurate portrayal of the arcade original, notably in its graphics and gameplay structure. Famicom Tsūshin commended the Game Boy version's faithful conversion alongside its support for the Super Game Boy peripheral, while Electric Playground stated that it should " be near the top of your Game Boy's next purchase list". Some publications expressed disappointment towards home releases for lacking extra features. GameSpot disliked the lack of online multiplayer in the Xbox 360 release, as well as the lack of an updated graphics setting, saying that the port was "awfully bare bones" compared to other XBLA releases. Eurogamer expressed distaste towards the Xbox 360 port's high price point, as well as the achievements for being "insultingly easy" to obtain. Eurogamer also agreed with GameSpot in the lack of online multiplayer.

Galaga has been listed by numerous publications among the greatest video games of all time. Flux magazine ranked it at #57 on their "Top 100 Video Games" in 1995, while Game Informer listed it at #23 in their "Top 200 Games of All Time" in 2010. Next Generation ranked it at #96 in their "Top 100 Games of All Time" for its innovation to shoot 'em up games as a whole, and at #17 in their "Top 50 Games of All Time". Game Informer labeled it the 19th greatest video game ever made in 2001, calling it the best game of the fixed-shooter genre. Electronic Gaming Monthly listed it at #20 in their "100 Best Games of All Time" in 1997 and "Top 100 Games of All Time" in 2001, and as #28 in their "Greatest 200 Videogames of Their Time" in 2006. GameFAQs users voted it the 15th greatest game ever made in 2004 and the 10th in 2009. GameSpy staff voted it the eighth best arcade game of all time in 2011. It was ranked at #93 in IGN's "Top 100 Games of All Time" for its engaging gameplay and long-standing appeal. The Killer List of Videogames listed it as #27 in their "Top 100 Video Games" list, as well as the 4th most collected arcade game and 2nd most popular on their website. Electronic Gaming Monthly listed Ms. Pac-Man/Galaga - Class of 1981 as the second best arcade game of all time for its inclusion of both games.

== Related media ==
Shortly after the game's release, Namco produced miniature Galaga cabinets for buses and airplanes, housed in small 17-inch CRT monitors. In 2000, Namco released an arcade cabinet to celebrate the game's 20th anniversary, which was bundled with Ms. Pac-Man and titled Ms. Pac-Man / Galaga - Class of 1981. A similar cabinet was released in 2005 that also included the original Pac-Man, made to celebrate the latter's 25th anniversary. Galaga is also included in both Pac-Man's Arcade Party (2010) and Pac-Man's Pixel Bash (2019).

Galaga has made cameo appearances in films including WarGames (1983), The Karate Kid (1984), Planes, Trains and Automobiles (1987), The Avengers (2012), and Pixels (2015). A submarine named after the game appears throughout the television series Lost. Hallmark Cards released a Galaga arcade cabinet ornament in 2009, which played sound effects from the game. In 2019, researchers at North Carolina State University named an extinct species of shark Galagadon nordquistae, due to the shark's teeth bearing a resemblance to the Galaga aliens. Galaga is also the subject of several high score-based tournaments; as of 2026, the world record is held by Noxcil with a score of 41,587,610 points.

Galaga was used as a loading screen minigame in the PlayStation version of Tekken. As a tie-in with the anime series Space Dandy, an iOS remake, Space Galaga, was released in 2015, featuring characters and starships from Space Dandy intermixed with Galaga gameplay. A similar crossover game, Galaga: Tekken Edition, was released the same year, replacing enemies with characters from the Tekken franchise. A Galaga-themed costume is also available as downloadable-content in LittleBigPlanet 3. The Boss Galaga appears as an item in Super Smash Bros. for Nintendo 3DS and Wii U and its followup Super Smash Bros. Ultimate, where it can capture an opponent and carry them off the screen. Ultimate also features a remix of the Galaga soundtrack. An animated television adaptation, Galaga Chronicles, is confirmed to be in development.
